= 2025–26 Colorado Buffaloes women's basketball team =

American college basketball season

2025–26 Colorado Buffaloes women's basketball

NCAA tournament, First Round
- Conference: Big 12 Conference
- Record: 22–12 (11–7 Big 12)
- Head coach: JR Payne (10th season)
- Associate head coach: Toriano Towns
- Assistant coaches: Taelor Karr; Matt Hower; Jordynn Hernandez; Shelley Sheetz
- Home arena: CU Events Center

2025–26 Big 12 women's basketball standings
	Conf.				Overall
Team	W		L	PCT	W		L	PCT
No. 6 TCU	15	–	3	.833	32	–	6	.842
No. 18 West Virginia †	14	–	4	.778	28	–	7	.800
No. 23 Baylor	13	–	5	.722	25	–	9	.735
Oklahoma State	12	–	6	.667	24	–	10	.706
Texas Tech	12	–	6	.667	26	–	8	.765
Colorado	11	–	7	.611	22	–	12	.647
Iowa State	10	–	8	.556	22	–	10	.688
Utah	10	–	8	.556	19	–	13	.594
BYU	9	–	9	.500	26	–	12	.684
Arizona State	9	–	9	.500	24	–	11	.686
Kansas	8	–	10	.444	22	–	14	.611
Kansas State	8	–	10	.444	19	–	18	.514
Cincinnati	6	–	12	.333	11	–	20	.355
UCF	3	–	15	.167	11	–	19	.367
Arizona	3	–	15	.167	12	–	18	.400
Houston	1	–	17	.056	7	–	23	.233
† 2026 Big 12 tournament winner Rankings from AP poll

The 2025–26 Colorado Buffaloes women's basketball team represented the University of Colorado Boulder during the 2025–26 NCAA Division I women's basketball season. The Buffaloes, led by tenth year head coach JR Payne, played their home games at the CU Events Center. This was Colorado's second season as members of the Big 12 Conference since 2011, after rejoining the conference in August 2024.

== Previous season ==
The Buffaloes finished the season 21–13, 9–9 in Big 12 play to finish in ninth place. They defeated Houston in the first round of the Big 12 women's tournament and Arizona in the second round, before losing to TCU in the quarterfinals. They received an at-large bid to the WBIT as a No. 1 seed in the Colorado Bracket, where they defeated Southeastern Louisiana in the first round, before losing in the second round to Gonzaga.

== Offseason ==
=== Departures ===
Colorado departures
Name	Num	Pos.	Height	Year	Hometown	Reason for departure
Ayianna Johnson	1	F	6'3"	Sophomore	Jefferson, WI	Transferred to UC Colorado Springs
Frida Formann	3	G	5'11"	Graduate student	Bagsværd, Denmark	Graduated
Erin Powell	8	F	6'0"	Freshman	Hampshire, England	Transferred to Northern Colorado
Sara-Rose Smith	9	G	6'1"	Graduate student	Victoria, Australia	Graduated
Lova Langerlid	10	G	6'0"	Freshman	Stockholm, Sweden	Transferred to Loyola Marymount
Nyamer Diew	11	F	6'2"	Graduate student	Marshall, MN	Graduated
Lior Garzon	12	F	6'1"	Graduate student	Ra'anana, Isreal	Graduated
Kindyll Wetta	15	G	5'9"	Senior	Castle Rock, CO	Graduated
Johanna Teder	21	G	5'8"	Graduate student	Tartu, Estonia	Graduated
Grace Oliver	24	F	6'1"	Freshman	Norwell, MA	Transferred to Wake Forest

=== Incoming ===
Colorado incoming transfers
Name	Num	Pos.	Height	Year	Hometown	Previous school
Zyanna Walker	1	G	5'8"	(redshirt) Junior	Wichita, KS	Kansas State
Desiree Wooten	3	G	5'8"	Junior	Dallas, TX	North Texas
Claire O'Connor	7	G	6'0"	Junior	Bellevue, WA	Gonzaga
Maeve McErlane	13	G	5'10"	(redshirt) Junior	Philadelphia, PA	DePaul
Anaëlle Dutat	15	F	6'0"	Senior	Cesson, France	Rhode Island

==== Recruiting ====
College recruiting
Name	Hometown	School	Height	Weight	Commit date
Logyn Greer; F	Wynnewood, PA	Friends' Central School	6 ft 3 in (1.91 m)	N/A	
Logyn Greer; F	Recruit ratings: ESPN: (92)				
Overall recruit ranking:
Note: In many cases, Scout, Rivals, 247Sports, On3, and ESPN may conflict in their listings of height and weight.; In these cases, the average was taken. ESPN grades are on a 100-point scale.; Sources: "2025 Player Commits". ESPN. Archived from the original on October 5, 2025.

== Roster ==
2025–26 Colorado Buffaloes women's basketball team
Players
Coaches

Pos.	#	Name	Height	Year	Previous school	Hometown
G	0	Erianna Gooden	6 ft 0 in (1.83 m)	Fr	Northside HS	Fort Smith, AR
G	1	Zyanna Walker	5 ft 8 in (1.73 m)	RS Jr	Wichita Heights HS; Kansas State	Wichita, KS
G	2	Kennedy Sanders	5 ft 8 in (1.73 m)	RS So	Chaska HS	Chaska, MN
G	3	Desiree Wooten	5 ft 8 in (1.73 m)	Jr	Manfield Timberview HS; North Texas	Dallas, TX
C	4	JoJo Nworie	6 ft 5 in (1.96 m)	Jr	Texas Tech	Lagos, Nigeria
G	7	Claire O'Connor	6 ft 0 in (1.83 m)	Jr	Lakeside School; Gonzaga	Bellevue, WA
C	8	Jade Crook	6 ft 4 in (1.93 m)	Fr	Australia Centre of Excellence; Lake Ginninderra College	Albury, Australia
G	10	Isa Hämäläinen	6 ft 1 in (1.85 m)	Fr	European School of Luxembourg 1	Lorentzweiler, Luxembourg
F	11	Logyn Greer	6 ft 4 in (1.93 m)	Fr	Friends' Central School	Lansdowne, PA
G	13	Maeve McErlane	5 ft 10 in (1.78 m)	RS Jr	Notre Dame; DePaul	Philadelphia, PA
F	14	Jade Masogayo	6 ft 3 in (1.91 m)	Sr	Fossil Ridge HS; Missouri State	Fort Worth, TX
F	15	Anaëlle Dutat	6 ft 0 in (1.83 m)	Sr	Lycée Victor Hugo; Rhode Island	Cesson, France
F	17	Tabitha Betson	6 ft 2 in (1.88 m)	So	DME Academy	Melbourne, Australia
F	22	Sophie Zadel	6 ft 4 in (1.93 m)	Fr	Alamo Heights HS	San Antonio, TX

Head coach

- JR Payne (Saint Mary's)

Assistant coach(es)

- Toriano Towns (Saint Mary's)
- Taelor Karr (Gonzaga)
- Matt Hower (Colorado State)
- Shelley Sheetz (Colorado)

Legend

- (C) Team captain
- (S) Suspended
- (I) Ineligible
- (W) Walk-on
- Injured
- Current redshirt

Roster

== Schedule and results ==
Date time, TV	Rank^{#}	Opponent^{#}	Result	Record	High points	High rebounds	High assists	Site (attendance) city, state
Exhibition
October 29, 2025*; 7:00 p.m.		Colorado Mines	W 87–24		–	–	–	CU Events Center; Boulder, CO
Non-conference regular season
November 6, 2025*; 6:00 p.m., ESPN+		New Mexico	W 84–59	1–0	16 – Dutat	13 – Dutat	3 – Tied	CU Events Center (1,735); Boulder, CO
November 12, 2025*; 5:00 p.m., ACCNX/ESPN+		at No. 22 Louisville	L 59–84	1–1	19 – Walker	11 – Dutat	4 – Walker	KFC Yum! Center (6,730); Louisville, KY
November 16, 2025*; 1:00 p.m., ESPN+		Portland State	W 77–45	2–1	19 – Greer	10 – Dutat	6 – Walker	CU Events Center (2,540); Boulder, CO
November 18, 2025*; 7:00 p.m., ESPN+		Boise State	W 83–53	3–1	17 – Dutat	5 – Tied	6 – Walker	CU Events Center (1,805); Boulder, CO
November 22, 2025*; 7:00 p.m., BallerTV		vs. UT Arlington; Hawaii North Shore Showcase	W 71–60	4–1	19 – Sanders	9 – Dutat	4 – Walker	George Q. Cannon Activities Center (350); Lāʻie, HI
November 24, 2025*; 5:30 p.m., BallerTV		vs. VCU; Hawaii North Shore Showcase	W 69–58	5–1	16 – Wooten	11 – Dutat	5 – Tied	George Q. Cannon Activities Center (254); Lāʻie, HI
November 25, 2025*; 5:00 p.m., BallerTV		vs. Texas A&M; Hawaii North Shore Showcase	L 46–59	5–2	14 – Walker	6 – Tied	3 – Dutat	George Q. Cannon Activities Center (359); Lāʻie, HI
November 30, 2025*; 1:00 p.m., ESPN+		Montana State	L 70–71	5–3	16 – Masogayo	9 – Dutat	5 – Wooten	CU Events Center (2,206); Boulder, CO
December 2, 2025*; 7:00 p.m., ESPN+		Charleston	W 66–47	6–3	14 – Sanders	8 – Greer	4 – Masogayo	CU Events Center (1,583); Boulder, CO
December 7, 2025*; 1:00 p.m., ESPN+		Wyoming	W 58–46	7–3	14 – Walker	7 – Greer	3 – Sanders	CU Events Center (2,394); Boulder, CO
December 14, 2025*; 1:00 p.m., ESPN+		Miami (OH)	W 75–55	8–3	19 – Masogayo	12 – Greer	4 – Walker	CU Events Center (2,315); Boulder, CO
December 16, 2025*; 7:00 p.m., ESPN+		Northern Colorado	W 79–62	9–3	18 – Greer	7 – Dutat	4 – Walker	CU Events Center (1,782); Boulder, CO
Big 12 regular season
December 21, 2025; 5:00 p.m., ESPN+		at Arizona State	L 63–79	9–4 (0–1)	15 – Walker	7 – Dutat	4 – Masogayo	Desert Financial Arena (7,421); Tempe, AZ
December 31, 2025; 7:00 p.m., ESPN+		Arizona	W 75–56	10–4 (1–1)	14 – Greer	12 – Dutat	7 – McErlane	CU Events Center (2,045); Boulder, CO
January 3, 2026; 1:00 p.m., ESPN+		Cincinnati	W 79–68	11–4 (2–1)	19 – Wooten	7 – Dutat	4 – Mcerlane	CU Events Center (2,406); Boulder, CO
January 8, 2026; 6:00 p.m., ESPN+		at No. 16 Baylor	L 52–56	11–5 (2–2)	16 – Walker	12 – Dutat	2 – Tied	Foster Pavilion (3,172); Waco, TX
January 11, 2026; 12:00 p.m., ESPN+		at Oklahoma State	L 56–63	11–6 (2–3)	12 – Tied	11 – Dutat	4 – Walker	Gallagher-Iba Arena (2,597); Stillwater, OK
January 14, 2026; 7:00 p.m., ESPN+		No. 19 Iowa State	W 68–62	12–6 (3–3)	24 – Wooten	12 – Dutat	4 – Walker	CU Events Center (4,183); Boulder, CO
January 18, 2026; 12:00 p.m., ESPN+		at UCF	L 68–74	12–7 (3–4)	15 – Wooten	7 – Masogayo	7 – Walker	Addition Financial Arena (1,156); Orlando, FL
January 25, 2026; 1:00 p.m., ESPN+		Oklahoma State	W 79–65	13–7 (4–4)	22 – Masogayo	9 – Wooten	4 – Wooten	CU Events Center (3,152); Boulder, CO
January 29, 2026; 5:30 p.m., ESPN+		at Kansas State	W 56–47	14–7 (5–4)	13 – Walker	10 – Walker	3 – Gooden	Bramlage Coliseum (3,232); Manhattan, KS
February 1, 2026; 1:00 p.m., ESPN+		at Kansas	W 69–66 ^{OT}	15–7 (6–4)	24 – Walker	8 – Masogayo	2 – Walker	Allen Fieldhouse (3,942); Lawrence, KS
February 4, 2026; 7:00 p.m., ESPN+		No. 20 West Virginia	L 55–61	15–8 (6–5)	13 – Masogayo	10 – Betson	4 – Wooten	CU Events Center (2,097); Boulder, CO
February 8, 2026; 1:00 p.m., ESPN+		No. 14 TCU	W 80–79	16–8 (7–5)	23 – Masogayo	5 – Tied	6 – Wooten	CU Events Center (2,240); Boulder, CO
February 11, 2026; 5:30 p.m., ESPN+		at Houston	W 73–63	17–8 (8–5)	20 – Masogayo	13 – Dutat	4 – Tied	Fertitta Center (976); Houston, TX
February 14, 2026; 1:00 p.m., ESPN+		BYU	W 76–46	18–8 (9–5)	19 – Dutat	10 – Dutat	7 – Wooten	CU Events Center (3,251); Boulder, CO
February 17, 2026; 6:00 p.m., ESPN+		at Arizona	W 78–70	19–8 (10–5)	20 – Dutat	9 – Walker	4 – Betson	McKale Center (5,393); Tucson, AZ
February 21, 2026; 7:00 p.m., ESPN+		No. 20 Texas Tech	W 75–68	20–8 (11–5)	18 – Walker	8 – Dutat	6 – Wooten	CU Events Center (4,852); Boulder, CO
February 24, 2026; 7:00 p.m., ESPN+		Utah	L 64–67	20–9 (11–6)	16 – Wooten	9 – Dutat	2 – Wooten	CU Events Center (2,675); Boulder, CO
February 28, 2026; 2:00 p.m., ESPN+		at BYU	L 62–75	20–10 (11–7)	25 – Wooten	8 – Greer	2 – Tied	Marriott Center (4,313); Provo, UT
Big 12 Tournament
March 5, 2026; 7:00 p.m., ESPN+	(6)	vs. (11) Kansas; Second round	W 55–48	21–10	10 – Tied	6 – Tied	4 – Tied	T-Mobile Center (4,646); Kansas City, MO
March 6, 2026; 7:00 p.m., ESPN+	(6)	vs. (3) No. 20 Baylor; Quarterfinals	W 62–53	22–10	21 – Wooten	6 – Tied	3 – Tied	T-Mobile Center (4,771); Kansas City, MO
March 7, 2026; 4:30 p.m., ESPN+	(6)	vs. (2) No. 15 West Virginia; Semifinals	L 47–48	22–11	16 – Walker	13 – Dutat	3 – Masogayo	T-Mobile Center (6,905); Kansas City, MO
NCAA Tournament
March 21, 2026*; 7:30 p.m., ESPN2	(10 FW1)	vs. (7 FW1) Illinois; First Round	L 57–66	22–12	17 – Wooten	7 – Wooten	3 – Betson	Memorial Gymnasium (4,111); Nashville, TN
*Non-conference game. ^{#}Rankings from AP Poll. (#) Tournament seedings in parentheses. Fort Worth 1=FW1. All times are in Mountain Time.

== Rankings ==
Ranking movements Legend: ██ Increase in ranking ██ Decrease in ranking — = Not ranked RV = Received votes
	Week																				
Poll	Pre	1	2	3	4	5	6	7	8	9	10	11	12	13	14	15	16	17	18	19	Final
AP	—	—	—	—	—	—	—	—	—	—	—	—	—	—	—	—	RV	—	RV	RV	
Coaches	RV	—	—	—	—	—	—	—	—	—	—	—	—	—	—	—	RV	RV	RV	RV	
