= 2025–26 BYU Cougars women's basketball team =

American college basketball season

2025–26 BYU Cougars women's basketball

WBIT, Runner-Up
- Conference: Big 12 Conference
- Record: 26–12 (9–9 Big 12)
- Head coach: Lee Cummard (1st season)
- Assistant coaches: Jordan Loera (2nd season); Keilani Unga (2nd season); Josh Edwards (2nd season); Andrew Curtis (1st season); Paisley Johnson-Harding (1st season)
- Home arena: Marriott Center

2025–26 Big 12 women's basketball standings
| | Conf. | | | | Overall |
| Team | W | | L | PCT | W | | L | PCT |
|---|---|---|---|---|---|---|---|---|
| No. 6 TCU | 15 | – | 3 | .833 | 32 | – | 6 | .842 |
| No. 18 West Virginia † | 14 | – | 4 | .778 | 28 | – | 7 | .800 |
| No. 23 Baylor | 13 | – | 5 | .722 | 25 | – | 9 | .735 |
| Oklahoma State | 12 | – | 6 | .667 | 24 | – | 10 | .706 |
| Texas Tech | 12 | – | 6 | .667 | 26 | – | 8 | .765 |
| Colorado | 11 | – | 7 | .611 | 22 | – | 12 | .647 |
| Iowa State | 10 | – | 8 | .556 | 22 | – | 10 | .688 |
| Utah | 10 | – | 8 | .556 | 19 | – | 13 | .594 |
| BYU | 9 | – | 9 | .500 | 26 | – | 12 | .684 |
| Arizona State | 9 | – | 9 | .500 | 24 | – | 11 | .686 |
| Kansas | 8 | – | 10 | .444 | 22 | – | 14 | .611 |
| Kansas State | 8 | – | 10 | .444 | 19 | – | 18 | .514 |
| Cincinnati | 6 | – | 12 | .333 | 11 | – | 20 | .355 |
| UCF | 3 | – | 15 | .167 | 11 | – | 19 | .367 |
| Arizona | 3 | – | 15 | .167 | 12 | – | 18 | .400 |
| Houston | 1 | – | 17 | .056 | 7 | – | 23 | .233 |
† 2026 Big 12 tournament winner Rankings from AP poll

The 2025–26 BYU Cougars women's basketball team will represent Brigham Young University during the 2025–26 NCAA Division I women's basketball season. The Cougars, are led by first-year head coach Lee Cummard and play their home games at the Marriott Center as members of the Big 12 Conference.

== Previous season ==
The Cougars finished the 2024–25 season 13–17, 4–14 in Big 12 play to finish in a three way tie for twelfth place. The Cougars were granted the No. 12 seed in the Big 12 tournament where they lost in the first round to UCF.

BYU announced that Amber Whiting decided to step down on March 8, 2025 after 3 seasons and a 45–51 record. Cougars associate head coach Cummard, who was initially named interim head coach following Whiting's departure, was officially hired as the new head coach on March 31.

== Offseason ==
=== Departures ===
BYU Departures
| Name | Number | Pos. | Height | Year | Hometown | Reason for Departure |
|---|---|---|---|---|---|---|
| Naia Tanuvasa | 0 | G | 5'10" | Freshman | Highland, UT | Transferred to Utah Valley |
| Amari Whiting | 1 | G | 5'10" | Sophomore | Boise, ID | Transferred to Oklahoma State |
| Kylie Krebs | 2 | G | 5'7" | Senior | Oahu, HI | Graduated |
| Kemery Congdon | 15 | G | 6'0" | (redshirt) Senior | Sandy, UT | Graduated |
| Emma Calvert | 25 | F | 6'4" | Senior | Farr West, UT | Graduated |
| Lauren Davenport | 30 | G | 6'0" | Senior | Idaho Falls, ID | Graduated |
| Kendra Gillispie | 35 | F | 6'2" | Senior | Oklahoma City, OK | Graduated |
| Sarah Bartholomew | 45 | C | 6'5" | Freshman | Highland, UT | Serving as a Missionary for The Church of Jesus Christ of Latter-day Saints in the Australia Brisbane Mission. |

=== Incoming ===
BYU incoming transfers
| Name | Num | Pos. | Height | Year | Hometown | Previous School |
|---|---|---|---|---|---|---|
| Lara Rohkohl | 13 | C/F | 6'3" | Senior | Hanover, Germany | Charleston |

==== Recruiting ====
College recruiting
| Name | Hometown | School | Height | Weight | Commit date |
|---|---|---|---|---|---|
| Sydney Benally; PG | Albuquerque, NM | Sandia High School | 5 ft 8 in (1.73 m) | N/A | |
| Sydney Benally; PG | Recruit ratings: ESPN: (91) | | | | |
Overall recruit ranking:
Note: In many cases, Scout, Rivals, 247Sports, On3, and ESPN may conflict in their listings of height and weight.; In these cases, the average was taken. ESPN grades are on a 100-point scale.; Sources: "2025 Player Commits". ESPN. Archived from the original on December 9, 2024.

== Roster ==
2025–26 BYU Cougars women's basketball team
Players
Coaches

| Pos. | # | Name | Height | Year | Previous school | Hometown |
|---|---|---|---|---|---|---|
| G | 2 | Sydney Benally | 5 ft 10 in (1.78 m) | Fr | Sandia | Albuquerque, NM |
| F | 3 | Bolanle Yussuf | 6 ft 3 in (1.91 m) | Fr | Kyoto Seika Gakuen | Lagos, Nigeria |
| G | 7 | Olivia Hamlin | 5 ft 10 in (1.78 m) | Fr | Snow Canyon | Santa Clara, UT |
| G | 8 | Arielle Mackey-Williams | 5 ft 9 in (1.75 m) | RS Jr | Tai Wananga Ki Ruakura | Ngāti Porou, New Zealand |
| G | 11 | Delaney Gibb | 5 ft 10 in (1.78 m) | So | Raymond | Raymond, AB |
| F | 13 | Lara Rohkohl | 6 ft 3 in (1.91 m) | Jr | IGS Roderbruch; College of Charleston | Hanover, Germany |
| G | 14 | Kambree Barber | 6 ft 0 in (1.83 m) | So | Rigby | Rigby, ID |
| F | 20 | Braeden Gunlock | 6 ft 0 in (1.83 m) | Fr | Bigfork | Bigfork, MT |
| F | 21 | Heather Hamson | 6 ft 3 in (1.91 m) | RS Sr | Pleasant Grove | Lindon, UT |
| G | 23 | Marya Hudgins | 6 ft 0 in (1.83 m) | RS Jr | Grandview; Santa Clara | Aurora, CO |
| G/F | 24 | Brinley Cannon | 6 ft 1 in (1.85 m) | So | Shelley | Shelley, ID |
| F | 30 | Mariam Traore | 6 ft 3 in (1.91 m) | Fr | Liahona Preparatory Academy | Kati, Mali |
| F | 33 | Hattie Ogden | 6 ft 1 in (1.85 m) | Sr | Magrath High School; Buffalo | Magrath, AB |

Head coach

- Lee Cummard (BYU)

Assistant coach(es)

- Jordan Loera (Oregon)
- Keilani Unga (BYU)
- Josh Edwards (St. Catharine)
- Andrew Curtis (Northern Arizona)
- Paisley Johnson-Harding (BYU)

Legend

- (C) Team captain
- (S) Suspended
- (I) Ineligible
- (W) Walk-on
- Injured
- Current redshirt

Roster

== Media coverage ==
=== Radio ===
Jason Shepherd returns to call women's basketball for the 2025–26 season, with Matthew Baiamonte filling in when Jason is gone for men's basketball. All games will be broadcast on BYU Radio's KUMT station (107.9 FM). Additionally they'll be streamed on byuradio.org and the BYU Radio App.

== Schedule and results ==
| Date time, TV | Rank^{#} | Opponent^{#} | Result | Record | High points | High rebounds | High assists | Site (attendance) city, state |
Exhibition
| October 28, 2025*; 7:00 p.m., ESPN+ | | Western Colorado | W 86–50 | – | 15 – Benally | 9 – Yussuf | 4 – Gibb | Marriott Center (6,052); Provo, UT |
Non-conference regular season
| November 5, 2025*; 7:00 p.m., ESPN+ | | Coastal Carolina | W 91–57 | 1–0 | 21 – Cannon | 10 – Rohkohl | 11 – Benally | Marriott Center (2,552); Provo, UT |
| November 8, 2025*; 2:00 p.m., ESPN+ | | San Jose State | W 70–51 | 2–0 | 21 – Gibb | 10 – Rohkohl | 6 – Gibb | Marriott Center (1,668); Provo, UT |
| November 13, 2025*; 7:00 p.m., ESPN+ | | Omaha | W 104–47 | 3–0 | 16 – Tied | 15 – Cannon | 6 – Hamlin | Marriott Center (2,058); Provo, UT |
| November 15, 2025*; 2:00 p.m., ESPN+ | | Fresno State | W 63–43 | 4–0 | 16 – Gibb | 10 – Rohkohl | 8 – Gibb | Marriott Center (1,287); Provo, UT |
| November 19, 2025*; 7:00 p.m., ESPN+ | | at Montana | W 70–69 | 5–0 | 23 – Hudgins | 9 – Rohkohl | 5 – Benally | Dahlberg Arena (2,543); Missoula, MT |
| November 22, 2025*; 2:00 p.m., ESPN+ | | Weber State | W 79–62 | 6–0 | 18 – Rohkohl | 7 – Cannon | 9 – Benally | Marriott Center (2,291); Provo, UT |
| November 27, 2025*; 3:30 p.m., ESPN+ | | vs. Virginia Tech; Paradise Jam Island Division semifinals | W 64–60 | 7–0 | 18 – Benally | 7 – Cannon | 7 – Benally | UVI Sports and Fitness Center (824); St. Thomas, USVI |
| November 29, 2025*; 10:00 a.m., ESPN+ | | vs. No. 17 Vanderbilt; Paradise Jam Island Division championship | L 71–84 | 7–1 | 24 – Hudgins | 12 – Hudgins | 5 – Cannon | UVI Sports and Fitness Center (324); St. Thomas, USVI |
| December 3, 2025*; 2:00 p.m., ESPN+ | | vs. Washington State | W 56–54 | 8–1 | 14 – Tied | 9 – Tied | 1 – Tied | Delta Center (274); Salt Lake City, UT |
| December 6, 2025*; 6:00 p.m., ESPN+ | | at Portland | W 87–53 | 9–1 | 20 – Hudgins | 8 – Cannon | 6 – Benally | Chiles Center (1,403); Portland, OR |
| December 11, 2025*; 7:00 p.m., ESPN+ | | Idaho State | W 68–59 | 10–1 | 22 – Hamlin | 7 – Tied | 5 – Tied | Marriott Center (2,224); Provo, UT |
| December 13, 2025*; 1:00 p.m., ESPN+ | | UTEP | W 81–46 | 11–1 | 20 – Hamlin | 9 – Yussuf | 7 – Benally | Marriott Center (1,977); Provo, UT |
Big 12 regular season
| December 20, 2025; 12:00 p.m., ESPN+ | | at UCF | W 71–50 | 12–1 (1–0) | 12 – Gibb | 11 – Rohkohl | 3 – Benally | Addition Financial Arena (1,011); Orlando, FL |
| December 31, 2025; 7:00 p.m., ESPN+ | | No. 8т TCU | L 48–72 | 12–2 (1–1) | 18 – Benally | 7 – Rohkohl | 5 – Gibb | Marriott Center (3,661); Provo, UT |
| January 3, 2026; 2:00 p.m., ESPN+ | | Arizona State | W 71–62 | 13–2 (2–1) | 18 – Gibb | 11 – Barber | 3 – Tied | Marriott Center (3,400); Provo, UT |
| January 6, 2026; 6:00 p.m., ESPN+ | | at Arizona | L 72–75 | 13–3 (2–2) | 21 – Gibb | 7 – Rohkohl | 8 – Gibb | McKale Center (6,504); Tucson, AZ |
| January 10, 2026; 12:00 p.m., ESPN+ | | at Houston | W 79–64 | 14–3 (3–2) | 19 – Gibb | 9 – Rohkohl | 9 – Benally | Fertitta Center (1,075); Houston, TX |
| January 17, 2026; 2:00 p.m., ESPN+ | | No. 18 Baylor | L 58–69 | 14–4 (3–3) | 20 – Gibb | 10 – Rohkohl | 4 – Tied | Marriott Center (3,251); Provo, UT |
| January 21, 2026; 7:00 p.m., ESPN+ | | No. 19 Texas Tech | W 73–61 | 15–4 (4–3) | 20 – Hamlin | 8 – Rohkohl | 6 – Gibb | Marriott Center (1,788); Provo, UT |
| January 24, 2026; 7:30 p.m., ESPN+ | | No. 22 West Virginia | L 77–91 | 15–5 (4–4) | 28 – Gibb | 7 – Hudgins | 3 – Cannon | Marriott Center (3,256); Provo, UT |
| January 28, 2026; 5:30 p.m., ESPN+ | | at Oklahoma State | L 51–67 | 15–6 (4–5) | 13 – Barber | 11 – Barber | 4 – Gibb | Gallagher-Iba Arena (2,596); Stillwater, OK |
| January 31, 2026; 2:00 p.m., ESPN+ | | Utah; Rivalry | W 77–65 | 16–6 (5–5) | 21 – Cannon | 8 – Gibb | 7 – Gibb | Marriott Center (4,622); Provo, UT |
| February 4, 2026; 5:30 p.m., ESPN+ | | at Kansas | L 60–81 | 16–7 (5–6) | 13 – Cannon | 8 – Barber | 3 – Hamlin | Allen Fieldhouse (3,679); Lawrence, KS |
| February 7, 2026; 3:00 p.m., ESPN+ | | at Kansas State | L 52–77 | 16–8 (5–7) | 11 – Gibb | 7 – Yussuf | 3 – Benally | Bramlage Coliseum (4,139); Manhattan, KS |
| February 10, 2026; 7:00 p.m., ESPN+ | | Iowa State | W 83–69 | 17–8 (6–7) | 23 – Hamlin | 9 – Rohkohl | 5 – Tied | Marriott Center (2,279); Provo, UT |
| February 14, 2026; 1:00 p.m., ESPN+ | | at Colorado | L 46–76 | 17–9 (6–8) | 14 – Hamlin | 7 – Yussuf | 3 – Barber | CU Events Center (3,251); Boulder, CO |
| February 17, 2026; 7:00 p.m., ESPN+ | | Cincinnati | L 67–76 | 17–10 (6–9) | 20 – Gibb | 7 – Gibb | 5 – Benally | Marriott Center (2,702); Provo, UT |
| February 21, 2026; 2:00 p.m., ESPN+ | | at Utah; Rivalry | W 86–74 | 18–10 (7–9) | 37 – Gibb | 7 – Barber | 5 – Gibb | Jon M. Huntsman Center (4,085); Salt Lake City, UT |
| February 25, 2026; 6:30 p.m., ESPN+ | | at Arizona State | W 66–61 | 19–10 (8–9) | 24 – Gibb | 11 – Barber | 6 – Gibb | Desert Financial Arena (6,755); Tempe, AZ |
| February 28, 2026; 2:00 p.m., ESPN+ | | Colorado | W 75–62 | 20–10 (9–9) | 26 – Gibb | 9 – Cannon | 7 – Gibb | Marriott Center (4,313); Provo, UT |
Big 12 Conference Tournament
| March 4, 2026; 12:30 p.m., ESPN+ | (9) | vs. (16) Houston; First Round | W 76–66 | 21–10 | 16 – Hamlin | 8 – Rohkohl | 6 – Benally | T-Mobile Center (4,328); Kansas City, MO |
| March 5, 2026; 12:30 p.m., ESPN+ | (9) | vs. (8) Utah; Second Round | W 70–52 | 22–10 | 19 – Gibb | 8 – Rohkohl | 8 – Gibb | T-Mobile Center (4,603); Kansas City, MO |
| March 6, 2026; 12:30 p.m., ESPNU | (9) | vs. (1) No. 10 TCU; Quarterfinals | L 46–63 | 22–11 | 17 – Gibb | 7 – Tied | 5 – Gibb | T-Mobile Center (3,812); Kansas City, MO |
WBIT
| March 19, 2026*; 7:00 p.m., ESPN+ | (1) | Alabama A&M; First Round | W 72–47 | 23–11 | 18 – Benally | 10 – Yussuf | 5 – Benally | Marriott Center (1,283); Provo, UT |
| March 23, 2026*; 7:00 p.m., ESPN+ | (1) | (4) Missouri; Second Round | W 93–75 | 24–11 | 29 – Gibb | 11 – Barber | 6 – Tied | Marriott Center (2,415); Provo, UT |
| March 26, 2026*; 7:00 p.m., ESPN+ | (1) | (2) Stanford; Quarterfinals | W 76–61 | 25–11 | 27 – Gibb | 11 – Rohkohl | 4 – Gibb | Marriott Center (3,541); Provo, UT |
| March 30, 2026*; 3:00 p.m., ESPNU | (1) | vs. (2) Kansas; Semifinals | W 70–67 | 26–11 | 23 – Hamlin | 14 – Rohkohl | 6 – Gibb | Charles Koch Arena (1,771); Wichita, KS |
| April 1, 2026*; 5:00 p.m., ESPN2 | (1) | vs. (4) Columbia; Finals | L 64–81 | 26–12 | – | – | – | Charles Koch Arena (1,871); Wichita, KS |
*Non-conference game. ^{#}Rankings from AP Poll. (#) Tournament seedings in parentheses. All times are in Mountain Time.

== Game summaries ==
=== Exhibition: Western Colorado ===
Broadcasters: Matthew Baiamonte and Kristen Kozlowski

Starting Lineups:

- Western Colorado: Penelope Urquhart, Ivey Schmidt, Chloe Daniels, Alyssa Eckroth, Jayda Maves
- BYU: Sydney Benally, Delaney Gibb, Lara Rohkohl, Marya Hudgins, Brinley Cannon

ESPN+

Oct. 28
7 p.m. MDT

Recap

Western Colorado Mountaineers 50, BYU Cougars 86
Scoring by quarter: 16–19, 9–14, 17–22, 8–31
| Pts: Ivey Schmidt 21; Rebs: Ivey Schmidt 8 Asts: Ivey Schmidt 2 | Pts: Sydney Bennally 15; Rebs: Bolanle Yussuf 9 Asts: Delaney Gibb 4 |

Marriott Center
Provo, UT
Attendance: 6,052
Referees: Julie Krommenhoek, Teresa Turner, Sydney Mott

=== Coastal Carolina ===
Broadcasters: Spencer Linton, Kristen Kozlowski, & Jasmine Poppinga

Series History: First Meeting
Starting Lineups:

- Coastal Carolina: Tessa Grady, Kristin Williams, Paige Bradley, Olivia Klanac, Tracey Hueston
- BYU: Sydney Benally, Delaney Gibb, Lara Rohkohl, Marya Hudgins, Brinley Cannon

ESPN+

Nov. 5
7 p.m. MST

Recap

Coastal Carolina Chanticleers 57, BYU Cougars 91
Scoring by quarter: 14–17, 15–19, 8–22, 20–33
| Pts: Kristin Williams 17; Rebs: Tracey Hueston 9 Asts: Kristin Williams 4 | Pts: Brinley Cannon 16; Rebs: Lara Rohkohl 10; Asts: Sydney Benally 11 |

Marriott Center
Provo, UT
Attendance: 2,552
Referees: Tiara Cruse, Cameron Inouye, Amy Krommenhoek

=== San Jose State ===
Broadcasters: Jarom Jordan, Kristen Kozlowski, and Aleigha McDonough

Series History: BYU leads series 4–2
Starting Lineups:

- Montana State: Darian White, Kola Bad Bear, Kately Limardo, Leia Beattie, Taylor Janssen
- BYU: Sydney Benally, Delaney Gibb, Lara Rohkohl, Marya Hudgins, Brinley Cannon

ESPN+

Nov. 8
2 p.m. MST

Recap

San Jose State Spartans 51, BYU Cougars 70
Scoring by quarter: 20–22, 5–13, 11–23, 15–12
| Pts: Maya Anderson 17; Rebs: Maya Anderson 8 Asts: Amira Brown, Maya Anderson, Stella Sgro, & Rylei Waugh 2 | Pts: Delaney Gibb 21; Rebs: Lara Rohkohl 10; Asts: Delaney Gibb 6 |

Marriott Center
Provo, UT
Attendance: 1,668
Referees: Michael Price, Esther Hsu, Brian Woods

=== Omaha ===
Broadcasters: Spencer Linton, Kristen Kozlowski, & Mary Hayes

Series History: First Meeting
Starting Lineups:

- Omaha: Leekaya Burke Perryman, Sarai Estupinan, Ali Stephens, Avril Smith, Cora Olsen
- BYU: Sydney Benally, Delaney Gibb, Marya Hudgins, Brinley Cannon, Lara Rohkohl

ESPN+

Nov. 13
7 p.m. MST

Recap

Omaha Mavericks 47, BYU Cougars 104
Scoring by quarter: 9–20, 8–20, 15–35, 15–29
| Pts: Sarai Estupinan, Cora Olsen 10; Rebs: Lillian Meerow 6 Asts: Leekaya Burke Perryman, Sarai Estupinan, Avril Smith, Cora Olsen, Daria Shelby, Elsa Vedral 1 | Pts: Delaney Gibb, Olivia Hamlin 16; Rebs: Brinley Cannon 15; Asts: Olivia Hamlin 6 |

Marriott Center
Provo, UT
Attendance: 2,058
Referees: Ken Nash, Teresa Turner, Cheryll Blue

=== Fresno State ===
Broadcasters: Jarom Jordan, Kristen Kozlowski, and Mary Hayes

Series History: BYU leads series 9–6
Starting Lineups:

- Fresno State: Danae Powell, Jaisa Gamble, Emilia Long, Ashlyn Rean, Hedda Koehne
- BYU: Sydney Benally, Delaney Gibb, Lara Rohkohl, Marya Hudgins, Brinley Cannon

ESPN+

Nov. 15
2 p.m. MST

Recap

Fresno State Bulldogs 43, BYU Cougars 63
Scoring by quarter: 17–15, 11–17, 9–21, 6–10
| Pts: Emilia Long 9 Rebs: Ashlyn Rean 6 Asts: Jaisa Gamble, Emilia Long 3 | Pts: Delaney Gibb 16; Rebs: Lara Rohkohl 10; Asts: Delaney Gibb 8 |

Marriott Center
Provo, UT
Attendance: 1,287
Referees: Gina Cross, Scott Yarbrough, Kevin Pethtel

=== Montana ===
Broadcaster: Riley "Ace" Sauerwein

Series History: Montana leads series 8-3
Starting Lineups:

- BYU: Sydney Benally, Olivia Hamlin, Lara Rohkohl, Marya Hudgins, Brinley Cannon
- Montana: Macy Donarski, Mack Konig, Avery Waddington, Aby Shubert, Jocelyn Land

ESPN+

Nov. 19
7 p.m. MST

Recap

BYU Cougars 70, Montana Lady Grizz 69
Scoring by quarter: 20–19, 18–15, 17–20, 15–15
| Pts: Marya Hudgins 23; Rebs: Lara Rohkohl 9 Asts: Sydney Benally 5 | Pts: Mack Konig 19; Rebs: Avery Waddington 13; Asts: Mack Konig 4 |

Dahlberg Arena
Missoula, MT
Attendance: 2,543
Referees: Lorena Ahumada, Sean Martin, Jillian Quinn

=== Weber State ===
Broadcasters: Brandon Crow, Kristen Kozlowski, & Aleigha McDonough

Series History: BYU leads series 46–9
Starting Lineups:

- Weber State: Antoinette Emma-Nnopu, Hannah Robbins, Makenna Shaffer, Sydney White, Lanae Billy
- BYU: Sydney Benally, Olivia Hamlin, Lara Rohkohl, Marya Hudgins, Brinley Cannon

ESPN+

Nov. 22
2 p.m. MST

Recap

Weber State Wildcats 62, BYU Cougars 79
Scoring by quarter: 19–16, 16–22, 19–23, 8–18
| Pts: Hannah Robbins 19; Rebs: Antoinette Emma-Nnopu 8 Asts: Antoinette Emma-Nnopu 8 | Pts: Lara Rohkohl 18; Rebs: Brinley Cannon 7 Asts: Sydney Benally 9 |

Marriott Center
Provo, UT
Attendance: 2,291
Referees: Kimberly Hobbs, Kelly Bloomfield, Charlie Stein

=== Virginia Tech ===
Broadcasters: Kevin Lehman & Brad Wells

Series History: First Meeting
Starting Lineups:

- BYU: Sydney Benally, Olivia Hamlin, Lara Rohkohl, Marya Hudgins, Brinley Cannon
- Virginia Tech: Kilah Freelon, Carleigh Wenzel, Mackenzie Nelson, Carys Baker, Mel Daley

ESPN+

Nov. 27
3:30 p.m. MST

Recap

BYU Cougars 64, Virginia Tech Hokies 60
Scoring by quarter: 13–12, 10–15, 20–11, 21–22
| Pts: Sydney Benally 18; Rebs: Brinley Cannon 7 Asts: Sydney Benally 7 | Pts: Carleigh Wenzel 18; Rebs: Kilah Freelon 14; Asts: Mackenzie Nelson 5 |

UVI Sports and Fitness Center
St. Thomas, US Virgin Islands
Attendance: 824
Referees: Joe Vaszily, Karen Preato, Trevor Inouye

=== Vanderbilt ===
Broadcasters: Kevin Lehman & Brad Wells

Series History: Vanderbilt leads series 1–0
Starting Lineups:

- BYU: Sydney Benally, Olivia Hamlin, Lara Rohkohl, Marya Hudgins, Brinley Cannon
- Vanderbilt: Mikayla Blakes, Aubrey Galavan, Justin Pissott, Ndjakalenga Mwenentanda, Sacha Washington

ESPN+

Nov. 29
10 a.m. MST

Recap

BYU Cougars 71, #17/17 Vanderbilt Commodores 84
Scoring by quarter: 28–16, 11–24, 16–24, 16–20
| Pts: Marya Hudgins 24; Rebs: Marya Hudgins 12; Asts: Brinley Cannon 5 | Pts: Mikayla Blakes 27; Rebs: Sac Washington 12; Asts: Mikayla Blakes, Sac Washington 6 |

UVI Sports and Fitness Center
St. Thomas, US Virgin Islands
Attendance: 324
Referees: Joe Vaszily, Karen Preato, Corey Long

=== Washington State ===
Spencer Linton & Kristen Kozlowski

Series History: BYU leads series 8-6
Starting Lineups:

- Washington State: Eleonora Villa, Mackenzie Chatfield, Tanja Valancic, Charlotte Abraham, Malia Ruud
- BYU: Sydney Benally, Olivia Hamlin, Lara Rohkohl, Marya Hudgins, Brinley Cannon

ESPN+

Dec. 3
2:30 p.m. MST

Recap

Washington State Cougars 54, BYU Cougars 56
Scoring by quarter: 10–14, 12–10, 17–12, 15–20
| Pts: Eleonora Villa 23; Rebs: Mackenzie Chatfield 8 Asts: Mackenzie Chatfield 4 | Pts: Olivia Hamlin, Arielle Mackey-Williams 14; Rebs: Marya Hudgins, Brinley Cannon 9 Asts: Bolanlee Yussuf, Arielle Mackey-Williams, Brinley Cannon 1 |

Delta Center
Salt Lake City, UT
Attendance: 274
Referees: Lisa Jones, Michol Murray, Infini Robinson

=== Portland ===
Broadcasters: Bryan Sleik & Jennifer Mountain

Series History: BYU leads series 27–8
Starting Lineups:

- BYU: Sydney Benally, Olivia Hamlin, Lara Rohkohl, Marya Hudgins, Brinley Cannon
- Portland: Florence Dallow, Natalie Fraley, Lainey Spear, Rhyan Mogel, Julia Dalan

ESPN+

Dec. 6
6 p.m. MST

Recap

BYU Cougars 87, Portland Pilots 53
Scoring by quarter: 21–19, 12–13, 29–10, 25–11
| Pts: Marya Hudgins 20; Rebs: Brinley Cannon 8 Asts: Sydney Benally 6 | Pts: Julia Dalan 13; Rebs: Julia Dalan, Natalie Fraley 4 Asts: Rhyan Mogel 5 |

Chiles Center
Portland, OR
Attendance: 1,403
Referees: Corey Long Jr., Kelly Broomfield, Angie Leite

=== Idaho State ===
Broadcasters: Dave McCann, Blaine Fowler, & Aleigha McDonough

Series History: BYU leads series 15-3
Starting Lineups:

- Idaho State: Kacey Spink, Aspen Caldwell, Alyse Aby, Tasia Jordan, Piper Carlson
- BYU: Sydney Benally, Olivia Hamlin, Lara Rohkohl, Marya Hudgins, Brinley Cannon

ESPN+

Dec. 11
7 p.m. MST

Recap

Idaho State Bengals 59, BYU Cougars 68
Scoring by quarter: 8–18, 23–9, 17–24, 11–17
| Pts: Tasia Jordan 22; Rebs: Piper Carlson 13; Asts: Aspen Caldwell 5 | Pts: Olivia Hamlin 22; Rebs: Bolanle Yussuf, Kambree Barber 7 Asts: Sydney Benally, Brinley Cannon 5 |

Marriott Center
Provo, UT
Attendance: 2,224
Referees: Brenda Pantoja, Kyle Bacon, Julie Krommenhoek

=== UTEP ===
Broadcasters: Spencer Linton, Kristen Kozlowski, and Aleigha McDonough

Series History: BYU leads series 24–9
Starting Lineups:

- UTEP: Sirviva Legions, Ivane Tensaie, Delma Zita, Portia Adams, Ndack Mbengue
- BYU: Sydney Benally, Olivia Hamlin, Lara Rohkohl, Marya Hudgins, Brinley Cannon

ESPN+

Dec. 13
1 p.m. MST

Recap

UTEP Miners 46, BYU Cougars 81
Scoring by quarter: 6–13, 8–29, 19–20, 13–19
| Pts: Sirviva Legions 13; Rebs: Ndack Mbengue 7 Asts: Sirviva Legions 3 | Pts: Olivia Hamlin 20; Rebs: Bolanle Yussuf 7 Asts: Sydney Benally 7 |

Marriott Center
Provo, UT
Attendance: 1,977
Referees: Melissa Barlow, Chuck Gonzalez, Eric Brewton

=== UCF ===
Broadcasters: Scott Adams, BJ Taylor, & Berkleigh Mezzanotte

Series History: BYU leads series 2-1
Starting Lineups:

- BYU: Sydney Benally, Olivia Hamlin, Lara Rohkohl, Marya Hudgins, Brinley Cannon
- UCF: Kristol Ayson, Jacorriah Bracey, Mahogany Chandler-Roberts, Khyala Ngodu, Leah Harmon

ESPN+

Dec. 20
12 p.m. MST

Recap

BYU Cougars 71, UCF Knights 50
Scoring by quarter: 17–12, 16–12, 22–6, 16–20
| Pts: Delaney Gibb 12; Rebs: Lara Rohkohl 11; Asts: Sydney Benally 3 | Pts: Leah Harmon 16; Rebs: Khyala Ngodu 7 Asts: Summer Yancy 3 |

Addition Financial Arena
Orlando, FL
Attendance: 1,011
Referees: Lisa Jones, Timothy Daley, Kimberly Hobbs

=== TCU ===
Broadcasters: Spencer Linton & Kristen Kozlowski

Series History: Series even 11–11
Starting Lineups:

- TCU: Donovyn Hunter, Olivia Miles, Marta Suarez, Clara Silva, Maddie Scheer
- BYU: Sydney Benally, Delaney Gibb, Lara Rohkohl, Marya Hudgins, Brinley Cannon

ESPN+

Dec. 31
7 p.m. MST

Recap

#8/7 TCU Horned Frogs 72, BYU Cougars 48
Scoring by quarter: 23–18, 10–9, 17–13, 22–8
| Pts: Clara Silva 15; Rebs: Olivia Miles 12; Asts: Olivia Miles 10 | Pts: Sydney Benally 18; Rebs: Lara Rohkohl 7 Asts: Delaney Gibb 5 |

Marriott Center
Provo, UT
Attendance: 3,661
Referees: Brenda Pantoja, Michol Murray, Nick Marshall

=== Arizona State ===
Broadcasters: Spencer Linton & Kristen Kozlowski

Series History: BYU leads series 8-5
Starting Lineups:

- Arizona State: Gabby Elliott, Marley Washenitz, Last-Tear Poa, Heloisa Carrera, McKinna Brackens
- BYU: Sydney Benally, Delaney Gibb, Lara Rohkohl, Marya Hudgins, Brinley Cannon

ESPN+

Jan. 3
2 p.m. MST

Recap

Arizona State Sun Devils 62, BYU Cougars 71
Scoring by quarter: 18–15, 16–13, 8–17, 20–26
| Pts: Gabby Elliott 21; Rebs: Heloisa Carrera 9 Asts: Jyah Lovett 4 | Pts: Delaney Gibb 18; Rebs: Kambree Barber 11; Asts: Sydney Benally, Delaney Gibb, Marya Hudgins 3 |

Marriott Center
Provo, UT
Attendance: 3,400
Referees: Metta Christensen, Corey Long, Brian Woods

=== Arizona ===
Broadcasters: Cindy Brunson, Joan Bonvicini, & Mackenzie Hamilton

Series History: Arizona leads series 8–7
Starting Lineups:

- BYU: Sydney Benally, Delaney Gibb, Lara Rohkohl, Marya Hudgins, Brinley Cannon
- Arizona: Mickayla Perdue, Sumayah Sugapong, Noelani Cornfield, Tanuyel Welch, Nora Francois

ESPN+

Jan. 6
7 p.m. MST

Recap

BYU Cougars 72, Arizona Wildcats 75
Scoring by quarter: 20–22, 13–11, 24–18, 15–24
| Pts: Delaney Gibb 21; Rebs: Lara Rohkohl 7 Asts: Delaney Gibb 8 | Pts: Nora Francois 21; Rebs: Tanyuel Welch 14; Asts: Noelani Cornfield 10 |

McKale Center
Tucson, AZ
Attendance: 6,504
Referees: Roy Gulbeyan, Kyle Bacon, Amy Krommenhoek

=== Houston ===
Broadcasters: Kevin DiDomenico, Austyn Iven, & Nicole Beckelman

Series History: Houston leads series 3-2
Starting Lineups:

- BYU: Sydney Benally, Delaney Gibb, Lara Rohkohl, Marya Hudgins, Brinley Cannon
- Houston: Kierra Merchant, Jade Jones, Kayla King, Shun'teria Anumele, Jorynn Ross

ESPN+

Jan. 10
1 p.m. MST

Recap

BYU Cougars 79, Houston Cougars 64
Scoring by quarter: 28–16, 10–17, 23–18, 18–13
| Pts: Delaney Gibb 19; Rebs: Lara Rohkohl 9 Asts: Sydney Benally 9 | Pts: Kyndall Hunter 19; Rebs: Jade Jones 9 Asts: Kyndall Hunter, Jorynn Ross 3 |

Fertitta Center
Houston, TX
Attendance: 1,075
Referees: Felicia Grinter, Lisa Jones, Michael McConnell

=== Baylor ===
Broadcasters: Spencer Linton, Kristen Kozlowski, & Jasmine Poppinga

Series History: Baylor series 3–2
Starting Lineups:

- Baylor: Taliah Scott, Kiersten Johnson, Jana Van Gytenbeek, Darianna Littlepage-Buggs, Bella Fontleroy
- BYU: Sydney Benally, Delaney Gibb, Lara Rohkohl, Marya Hudgins, Brinley Cannon

ESPN+

Jan. 17
2 p.m. MST

Recap

#18/17 Baylor Bears 69, BYU Cougars 58
Scoring by quarter: 23–13, 14–14, 14–19, 18–12
| Pts: Taliah Scott 25; Rebs: Darianna Littlepage-Buggs 9 Asts: Taliah Scott 5 | Pts: Delaney Gibb 20; Rebs: Lara Rohkohl 10; Asts: Sydney Benally, Delaney Gibb 4 |

Marriott Center
Provo, UT
Attendance: 3,251
Referees: Julie Krommenhoek, Bill Larance, Nicole Leon

=== Texas Tech ===
Broadcasters: Spencer Linton, Kristen Kozlowski, & Jasmine Poppinga

Series History: Texas Tech leads series 3-2
Starting Lineups:

- Texas Tech: Jalynn Bristow, Gemma Nunez, Denae Fritz, Sarengbe Sanogo, Bailey Maupin
- BYU: Sydney Benally, Delaney Gibb, Lara Rohkohl, Marya Hudgins, Brinley Cannon

ESPN+

Jan. 21
7 p.m. MST

Recap

#19/19 Texas Tech Lady Raiders 61, BYU Cougars 73
Scoring by quarter: 16–25, 18–15, 14–16, 13–17
| Pts: Snudda Collins 17; Rebs: Jalynn Bristow 11; Asts: Gemma Nunez 5 | Pts: Olivia Hamlin 20; Rebs: Lara Rohkohl 8 Asts: Delaney Gibb 6 |

Marriott Center
Provo, UT
Attendance: 1,788
Referees: Michol Murray, Kimberly Hobbs, Teresa Turner

=== West Virginia ===
Broadcasters: Spencer Linton, Kristen Kozlowski, & Jasmine Poppinga

Series History: West Virginia leads series 2–1
Starting Lineups:

- West Virginia: Carter McCray, Gia Cooke, Sydney Shaw, Jordan Harrison, Kierra Wheeler
- BYU: Sydney Benally, Delaney Gibb, Lara Rohkohl, Marya Hudgins, Brinley Cannon

ESPN+

Jan. 24
7:30 p.m. MST

Recap

#22/22 West Virginia Mountaineers 91, BYU Cougars 77
Scoring by quarter: 16–21, 25–17, 21–17, 29–22
| Pts: Sydney Woodley 23; Rebs: Carter McCray 11; Asts: Jordan Harrison 6 | Pts: Delaney Gibb 28; Rebs: Marya Hudgins 7 Asts: Brinley Cannon 3 |

Marriott Center
Provo, UT
Attendance: 3,256
Referees: Michol Murray, Kimberly Hobbs, Teresa Turner

=== Oklahoma State ===
Broadcasters: Adam Hildebrandt & Bryndon Manzer

Series History: Oklahoma State leads series 3-2
Starting Lineups:

- BYU: Sydney Benally, Delaney Gibb, Lara Rohkohl, Marya Hudgins, Brinley Cannon
- Oklahoma State: Amari Whiting, Micah Gray, Achol Akot, Haleigh Timmer, Stailee Heard

ESPN+

Jan. 28
5:30 p.m. MST

Recap

BYU Cougars 51, Oklahoma State Cowgirls 67
Scoring by quarter: 25–19, 3–20, 15–18, 8–10
| Pts: Kambree Barber 13; Rebs: Kambree Barber 11; Asts: Delaney Gibb 4 | Pts: Micah Gray 25; Rebs: Achol Akot 14; Asts: Stailee Heard 7 |

Gallagher-Iba Arena
Stillwater, OK
Attendance: 2,596
Referees: Gina Cross, Brian Garland, In'Fini Robinson

=== Utah ===
Broadcasters: Dave McCann, Kristen Kozlowski, & Jasmine Poppinga

Series History: Utah leads series 70–43
Starting Lineups:

- Utah: Lani White, Brooke Walker, Chyra Evans, Reese Ross, Maty Wilke
- BYU: Sydney Benally, Delaney Gibb, Lara Rohkohl, Marya Hudgins, Brinley Cannon

ESPN+

Jan. 31
2 p.m. MST

Recap

Utah Utes 65, BYU Cougars 77
Scoring by quarter: 18–14, 17–11, 17–23, 13–29
| Pts: Lani White 20; Rebs: Reese Ross 13; Asts: Lani White 2 | Pts: Brinley Cannon 21; Rebs: Delaney Gibb 8 Asts: Delaney Gibb 7 |

Marriott Center
Provo, UT
Attendance: 4,622
Referees: Michol Murray, Chuck Gonzalez, Tiara Cruz

=== Kansas ===
Broadcasters: Brenda VanLengen and Niccolly Wuellner

Series History: Kansas leads series 4-0
Starting Lineups:

- BYU: Sydney Benally, Delaney Gibb, Lara Rohkohl, Marya Hudgins, Brinley Cannon
- Kansas: S'Mya Nichols, Libby Fandel, Sania Copeland, Jaliya Davis, Lilly Meister

ESPN+

Feb. 4
5:30 p.m. MST

Recap

BYU Cougars 60, Kansas Jayhawks 81
Scoring by quarter: 13–15, 19–17, 13–25, 15–24
| Pts: Brinley Cannon 13; Rebs: Kambree Barber 8 Asts: Olivia Hamlin 3 | Pts: Jaliya Davis 28; Rebs: Jaliya Davis 12; Asts: S'Mya Nichols, Elle Evans 4 |

Allen Fieldhouse
Lawrence, KS
Attendance: 3,679
Referees: Eric Brewton, Kenneth Nash, Maj Forsberg

=== Kansas State ===
Broadcasters: Brian Smoller, Kindred Orpin and Hannah Whetstone

Series History: Kansas State leads series 5–0
Starting Lineups:

- BYU: Sydney Benally, Delaney Gibb, Lara Rohkohl, Marya Hudgins, Brinley Cannon
- Kansas State: Brandie Harrod, Nastja Claessens, Gina Garcia, Taryn Sides, Tess Heal

ESPN+

Feb. 7
3 p.m. MST

Recap

BYU Cougars 52, Kansas State Wildcats 77
Scoring by quarter: 14-18, 16-20, 9-19, 13-20
| Pts: Delaney Gibb 11; Rebs: Bolanle Yussuf 7 Asts: Sydney Benally 3 | Pts: Nastja Claessens 25; Rebs: Brandie Harrod 10; Asts: Taryn Sides 13 |

Bramlage Coliseum
Manhattan, KS
Attendance: 4,139
Referees: Melissa Barlow, Kevin Pethtel, Timothy Daley

=== Iowa State ===
Broadcasters: Spencer Linton, Kristen Kozlowski and Aleigha McDonough

Series History: Iowa State leads series 3-2
Starting Lineups:

- Iowa State: Arianna Jackson, Evangelia Paulk, Jada Williams, Kenzie Hare, Audi Crooks
- BYU: Sydney Benally, Delaney Gibb, Lara Rohkohl, Marya Hudgins, Brinley Cannon

ESPN+

Feb. 10
7 p.m. MST

Recap

Iowa State Cyclones 69, BYU Cougars 83
Scoring by quarter: 21-20, 21-23, 10-26, 17-14
| Pts: Audi Crooks 18; Rebs: Sydney Harris 7 Asts: Reese Beaty 5 | Pts: Olivia Hamlin 23; Rebs: Lara Rohkohl 9 Asts: Sydney Benally, Marya Hudgins 5 |

Marriott Center
Provo, UT
Attendance: 2,279
Referees: Natasha Camy, Michael Price, Jeff Wooten

=== Colorado ===
Broadcasters: Brad Thompson and Kami Carmann

Series History: Colorado leads series 9–7
Starting Lineups:

- BYU: Sydney Benally, Delaney Gibb, Lara Rohkohl, Marya Hudgins, Brinley Cannon
- Colorado: Zyanna Walker, Maeve McErlane, Jade Masogayo, Anaelle Dutat, Tabitha Betson

ESPN+

Feb. 14
1 p.m. MST

Recap

BYU Cougars 46, Colorado Buffaloes 76
Scoring by quarter: 8-17, 10-24, 13-17, 15-18
| Pts: Olivia Hamlin 14; Rebs: Bolanle Yussuf 7 Asts: Kambree Barber 3 | Pts: Anaelle Dutat 19; Rebs: Anaelle Dutat 10; Asts: Desiree Wooten 7 |

CU Events Center
Boulder, CO
Attendance: 3,251
Referees: Felicia Grinter, Ester Hsu, Nicole Brannon

=== Cincinnati ===
Broadcasters: Spencer Linton, Kristen Kozlowski and Aleigha McDonough

Series History: BYU leads series 3–1
Starting Lineups:

- Cincinnati: Mya Perry, Reagan Jackson, Caliyah DeVillasee, Kylie Torrence, Destiny Thomas
- BYU: Sydney Benally, Delaney Gibb, Lara Rohkohl, Marya Hudgins, Brinley Cannon

ESPN+

Feb. 17
7 p.m. MST

Recap

Cincinnati Bearcats 76, BYU Cougars 67
Scoring by quarter: 29-25, 11-11, 11-15, 25-16
| Pts: Mya Perry 32; Rebs: Kylie Torrence 7 Asts: Reagan Jackson 4 | Pts: Delaney Gibb 20; Rebs: Delaney Gibb 7 Asts: Sydney Benally 5 |

Marriott Center
Provo, UT
Attendance: 2,702
Referees: Kyle Bacon, Kenneth Nash, In'Fini Robinson

=== Utah ===
Broadcasters: Tony Parks, Elaine Elliott, & Sammy Miller

Series History: Utah leads series 70–44
Starting Lineups:

- BYU: Sydney Benally, Delaney Gibb, Lara Rohkohl, Kambree Barber, Brinley Cannon
- Utah: Lani White, LA Sneed, Chyra Evans, Reese Ross, Maty Wilke

ESPN+

Feb. 21
2 p.m. MST

Recap

BYU Cougars 86, Utah Utes 74
Scoring by quarter: 19–16, 17–13, 20–12, 30–33
| Pts: Delaney Gibb 37; Rebs: Kambree Barber 7 Asts: Delaney Gibb 5 | Pts: Lani White 20; Rebs: Reese Ross 7 Asts: Reese Ross 4 |

Jon M. Huntsman Center
Salt Lake City, UT
Attendance: 4,085
Referees: Melissa Barlow, Brian Woods, Brad Maxeey

=== Arizona State ===
Broadcasters: Braiden Bell & Charli Turner Thorne

Series History: BYU leads series 9–5
Starting Lineups:

- BYU: Sydney Benally, Delaney Gibb, Lara Rohkohl, Kambree Barber, Brinley Cannon
- Arizona State: Gabby Elliott, Marley Washenitz, Last-Tear Poa, Heloisa Carrera, McKinna Brackens

ESPN+

Feb. 25
6:30 p.m. MST

Recap

BYU Cougars 66, Arizona State Sun Devils 61
Scoring by quarter: 12–13, 6–18, 28–11, 20–19
| Pts: Delaney Gibb 24; Rebs: Kambree Barber 11; Asts: Delaney Gibb 6 | Pts: McKinna Brackens 16; Rebs: Marley Washenitz 7 Asts: Last-Tear Poa 5 |

Deseret Financial Arena
Tempe, AZ
Attendance: 6,755
Referees: Michol Murray, In'Fini Robinson, Xiomara Cruz-Johnson

=== Colorado ===
Broadcasters: Spencer Linton & Kristen Kozlowski

Series History: Colorado leads series 10–7
Starting Lineups:

- Colorado: Zyanna Walker, Maeve McErlane, Jade Masogayo, Anaelle Dutat, Tabitha Betson
- BYU: Sydney Benally, Delaney Gibb, Lara Rohkohl, Kambree Barber, Brinley Cannon

ESPN+

Feb. 28
2 p.m. MST

Recap

Colorado Buffaloes 62, BYU Cougars 75
Scoring by quarter: 16–20, 14–12, 26–16, 6–27
| Pts: Desiree Wooten 25; Rebs: Logyn Greer 8 Asts: Zyanna Walker, Jade Masogayo, Anaelle Dutat, Desiree Wooten 2 | Pts: Delaney Gibb 26; Rebs: Brinley Cannon 9 Asts: Delaney Gibb 7 |

Marriott Center
Provo, UT
Attendance: 4,313
Referees: Brenda Pantoja, Chuck Gonzales, Lisa Jones

=== Big 12 1st Round: Houston ===
Broadcasters: Eric Frede & Christy Thomaskutty

Series History: Series even 3-3
Starting Lineups:

- Houston: TK Pitts, Briana Peguero, Kyndall Hunter, Jade Jones, Jorynn Ross
- BYU: Sydney Benally, Delaney Gibb, Lara Rohkohl, Kambree Barber, Brinley Cannon

ESPN+

Mar. 4
12:30 p.m. MST

Recap

Houston Cougars 66, BYU Cougars 76
Scoring by quarter: 10–11, 19–18, 15–27, 20–22
| Pts: Shun'teria Anumele 17; Rebs: TK Pitts 10; Asts: Kierra Merchant 3 | Pts: Olivia Hamlin 16; Rebs: Brinley Cannon 6 Asts: Sydney Benally 6 |

T-Mobile Center
Kansas City, MO
Attendance: 4,328
Referees: Roy Gulbeyan, Michol Murray, Doug Knight

=== Big 12 2nd Round: Utah ===
Broadcasters: Eric Frede & Christy Thomaskutty

Series History: Utah leads series 70–45
Starting Lineups:

- BYU: Sydney Benally, Delaney Gibb, Lara Rohkohl, Kambree Barber, Brinley Cannon
- Utah: Lani White, LA Sneed, Chyra Evans, Reese Ross, Maty Wilke

ESPN+

Mar. 5
12:30 p.m. MST

Recap

BYU Cougars 70, Utah Utes 52
Scoring by quarter: 22–17, 5–19, 24–7, 19–9
| Pts: Delaney Gibb 19; Rebs: Lara Rohkohl 8 Asts: Delaney Gibb 8 | Pts: Lani White 20; Rebs: Chyra Evans 8 Asts: LA Sneed 5 |

Marriott Center
Provo, UT
Attendance: 4,603
Referees: In'Fini Robinson, Kimberly Hobbs, Kenneth Nash

=== Big 12 Quarterfinal: TCU ===
Broadcasters: Eric Frede & Christy Thomaskutty

Series History: TCU leads series 12–11
Starting Lineups:

- BYU: Sydney Benally, Delaney Gibb, Lara Rohkohl, Kambree Barber, Brinley Cannon
- TCU: Taylor Bigby, Donovyn Hunter, Olivia Miles, Marta Suarez, Clara Silva

ESPNU

Mar. 6
12:30 p.m. MST

Recap

BYU Cougars 46, #10/10 TCU Horned Frogs 63
Scoring by quarter: 8-24, 11-8, 14-13, 13-18
| Pts: Delaney Gibb 17; Rebs: Delaney Gibb, Brinley Cannon 7 Asts: Delaney Gibb 5 | Pts: Marta Suarez 17; Rebs: Olivia Miles 10; Asts: Olivia Miles 6 |

T-Mobile Center
Kansas City, MO
Attendance: 3,812
Referees: Brian Hall, Kyle Bacon, Teresa Turner

== Rankings ==
BYU was picked to finish tenth in the preseason coaches poll. After going 9–9 in conference play BYU finished in 9th, exceeding expectations. Additionally Lee Cummard became only the 3rd BYU women's basketball coach to win 20 games in his inaugural season. In the process he also led them to the most wins they'd achieved in Big 12 play to date. While BYU wasn't in the polls most of the season, they did receive some votes during non-conference play.

Ranking movements Legend: ██ Increase in ranking ██ Decrease in ranking — = Not ranked RV = Received votes
| | Week | | | | | | | | | | | | | | | | | | | | |
| Poll | Pre | 1 | 2 | 3 | 4 | 5 | 6 | 7 | 8 | 9 | 10 | 11 | 12 | 13 | 14 | 15 | 16 | 17 | 18 | 19 | Final |
|---|---|---|---|---|---|---|---|---|---|---|---|---|---|---|---|---|---|---|---|---|---|
| AP | — | — | — | — | — | — | — | RV | RV* | — | — | — | — | — | — | — | — | — | — | | |
| Coaches | — | — | — | — | — | — | — | — | — | — | — | — | — | — | — | — | — | — | — | | |

*AP did not release a week 8 poll.

== See also ==
- 2025–26 BYU Cougars men's basketball team
- 2026 BYU Cougars men's volleyball team
