= Johanna Teder =

Estonian basketball player (born 2000)

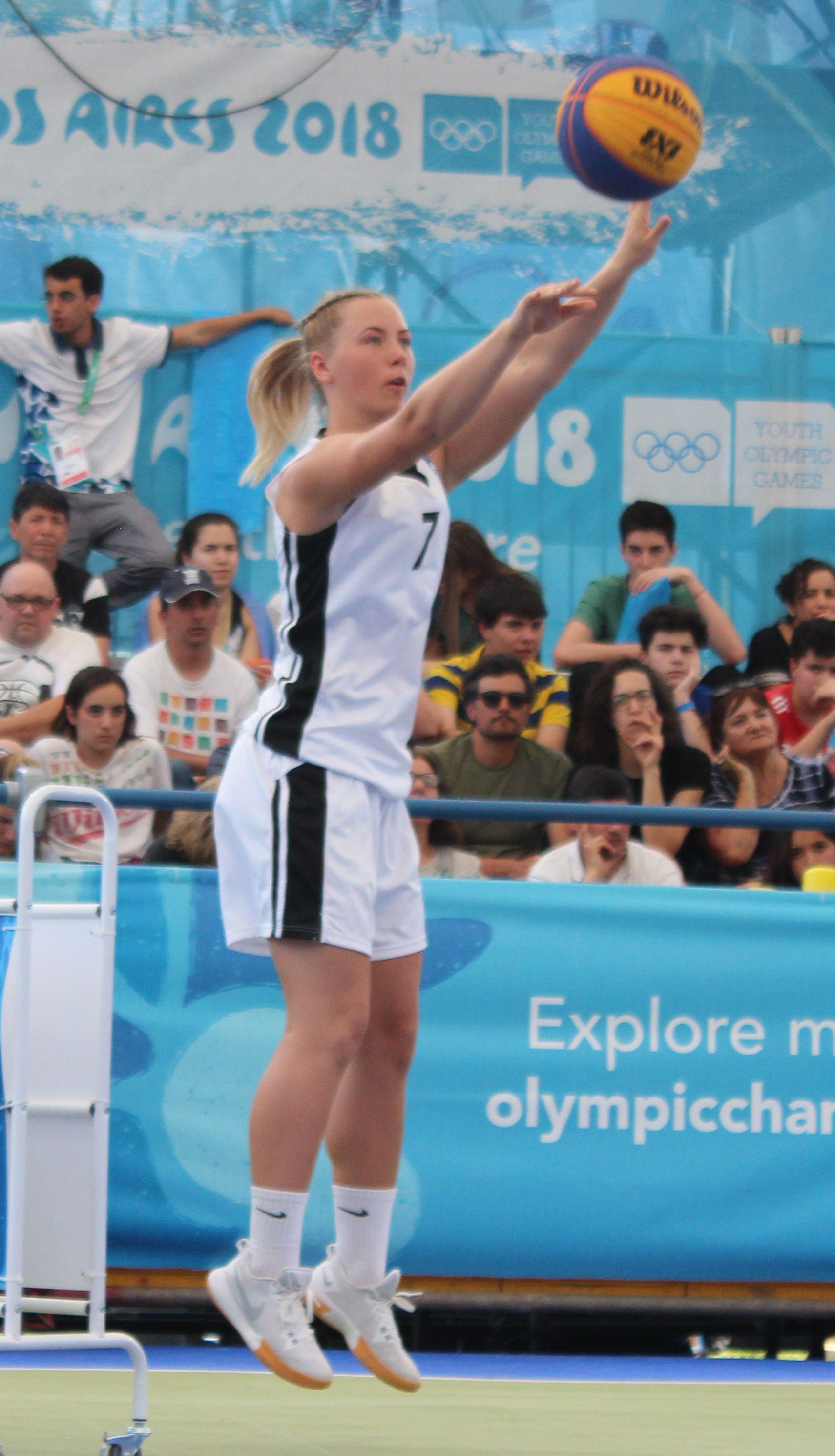
- Teder at the 2018 Summer Youth Olympics in Buenos Aires, Argentina

Personal information
- Born: February 5, 2000 (age 26) Tartu, Estonia
- Listed height: 5 ft 8 in (1.73 m)

Career information
- High school: Audentese Spordigümnaasium (Tallinn, Estonia)
- College: South Plains College (2019–2020); Washington State (2020–2024); Colorado (2024–2025)
- Playing career: 2025–present
- Position: Guard

Career history
- 2025–present: Limonta Sport Costa Masnaga

Career highlights
- All-WJCAC First Team (2020); Pac-12 Player of the Week (February 20, 2022)

Johanna Eliise Teder (born February 5, 2000) is an Estonian basketball player who plays professionally for Limonta Sport Costa Masnaga in Italy's Serie A2 Femminile. She played college basketball for South Plains College, the Washington State Cougars, and the Colorado Buffaloes. Teder has represented the Estonia national team in international competition.

== Early life ==
Teder was born on February 5, 2000, in Tartu, Estonia. She began playing basketball at a young age and, at 16, moved to Tallinn to attend Audentese Spordigümnaasium, a preparatory sports school for student-athletes, to further her development. During her time there, she trained intensively and drew interest from college programs in the United States.

Teder initially committed to play college basketball at the University of San Francisco in 2018, but due to eligibility issues, pursued a junior college route instead. She enrolled at South Plains College in Levelland, Texas, where she played one season before transferring to Washington State.

== College career ==
=== South Plains ===
Teder played one season at South Plains College, a junior college in Levelland, Texas. During the 2019–20 season, she appeared in 33 games and helped lead the team to a 32–1 record. She averaged 7.9 points and 4.4 assists per game while shooting 46.9 percent from the field. She was named an All-Western Junior College Athletic Conference (WJCAC) First Team selection. Following the season, she transferred to Washington State.

=== Washington State ===
During the 2020–21 season, Teder started 24 games and averaged 7.1 points per game while shooting 33.6 percent from three-point range. She ranked third on the team with 39 made three-pointers and recorded a career-high 23 points against Washington. That season, she was part of the Washington State team that reached the NCAA tournament, ending a 30-year drought.

In her junior season (2021–22), Teder averaged 10.2 points per game and led the team with 56 made three-pointers. She averaged 32.0 minutes per game, ranking 10th in the Pac-12. She earned Pac-12 Player of the Week honors on February 21, 2022.

During the 2022–23 season, her senior year, Teder started a career-high 34 games and averaged 7.9 points per game. She finished second on the team with 59 made three-pointers, which tied for eighth-most in the Pac-12. Teder was part of the Washington State team that won the Pac-12 tournament championship, the first in program history. By the end of her tenure at Washington State, she ranked sixth in program history with 154 made three-pointers.

During the 2023–24 season, Teder did not play due to a prolonged injury that had affected her over multiple years. Following the season she entered the transfer portal and committed to Colorado.

=== Colorado ===
Following the 2023–24 season, Teder transferred to the Colorado Buffaloes as a graduate student. In her only season with the team 2024–25, she played in 34 games, making 19 starts, and averaged 5.1 points and 1.8 assists per game.

== Professional career ==
=== Limonta Sport Costa Masnaga ===
Teder signed with Limonta Sport Costa Masnaga of the Serie A2 Femminile in Italy for the 2025–26 season. In her first professional season, she averaged 11.4 points and 5.1 assists per game.

== National team career ==
Teder has represented the Estonia national team in international competition, including in FIBA Women's EuroBasket qualifiers. She made her senior national team debut in a EuroBasket qualifying game against Belarus, recording four points and four assists in 21 minutes.

At the youth level, Teder represented Estonia in the FIBA U16 and U18 European Championships, where she served as a starting point guard and led her teams in assists. She also competed in FIBA 3x3 at the 2018 Summer Youth Olympics in Buenos Aires.

== College statistics ==
Legend
GP	Games played	GS	Games started	MPG	Minutes per game	FG%	Field goal percentage	3P%	3-point field goal percentage
FT%	Free throw percentage	RPG	Rebounds per game	APG	Assists per game	SPG	Steals per game	BPG	Blocks per game
TO	Turnovers per game	PPG	Points per game	**Bold**	Career high

=== College ===
NJCAA/NCAA statistics
Year	Team	GP	GS	MPG	FG%	3P%	FT%	RPG	APG	SPG	BPG	TO	PPG
2019–20	South Plains	33	14	21.3	.469	**.375**	.706	**2.9**	**4.4**	1.8	**0.2**	2.1	7.9
2020–21	Washington State	24	24	28.5	.380	.336	.706	2.5	1.7	0.8	0.1	**1.5**	7.1
2021–22	Washington State	28	28	**31.9**	.358	.327	.738	2.8	2.3	1.1	0.1	2.6	**10.2**
2022–23	Washington State	**34**	**34**	26.7	.371	.345	**.765**	2.0	2.6	1.0	0.1	1.8	7.9
2024–25	Colorado	**34**	19	19.9	**.474**	**.375**	.636	1.6	1.8	**2.1**	0.1	1.6	5.1
**Career**		153	119	25.3	.402	.347	.714	2.3	2.6	1.2	0.1	1.9	7.6
