= 2025–26 TCU Horned Frogs women's basketball team =

Intercollegiate basketball season team

2025–26 TCU Horned Frogs women's basketball

Big 12 regular season champions

NCAA tournament, Elite Eight
- Conference: Big 12 Conference

Ranking
- Coaches: No. 12
- AP: No. 14
- Record: 32–6 (15–3 Big 12)
- Head coach: Mark Campbell (3rd season)
- Assistant coaches: Xavier Lopez; Minyon Moore; Nia Jackson; Nolan Wilson; Jessie Craig
- Home arena: Schollmaier Arena

2025–26 Big 12 women's basketball standings
| | Conf. | | | | Overall |
| Team | W | | L | PCT | W | | L | PCT |
|---|---|---|---|---|---|---|---|---|
| No. 6 TCU | 15 | – | 3 | .833 | 32 | – | 6 | .842 |
| No. 18 West Virginia † | 14 | – | 4 | .778 | 28 | – | 7 | .800 |
| No. 23 Baylor | 13 | – | 5 | .722 | 25 | – | 9 | .735 |
| Oklahoma State | 12 | – | 6 | .667 | 24 | – | 10 | .706 |
| Texas Tech | 12 | – | 6 | .667 | 26 | – | 8 | .765 |
| Colorado | 11 | – | 7 | .611 | 22 | – | 12 | .647 |
| Iowa State | 10 | – | 8 | .556 | 22 | – | 10 | .688 |
| Utah | 10 | – | 8 | .556 | 19 | – | 13 | .594 |
| BYU | 9 | – | 9 | .500 | 26 | – | 12 | .684 |
| Arizona State | 9 | – | 9 | .500 | 24 | – | 11 | .686 |
| Kansas | 8 | – | 10 | .444 | 22 | – | 14 | .611 |
| Kansas State | 8 | – | 10 | .444 | 19 | – | 18 | .514 |
| Cincinnati | 6 | – | 12 | .333 | 11 | – | 20 | .355 |
| UCF | 3 | – | 15 | .167 | 11 | – | 19 | .367 |
| Arizona | 3 | – | 15 | .167 | 12 | – | 18 | .400 |
| Houston | 1 | – | 17 | .056 | 7 | – | 23 | .233 |
† 2026 Big 12 tournament winner Rankings from AP poll

The 2025–26 TCU Horned Frogs women's basketball team currently represents Texas Christian University during the 2025–26 NCAA Division I women's basketball season. The Horned Frogs, led by third-year head coach Mark Campbell, played their home games at the Schollmaier Arena in Fort Worth, Texas as members of the Big 12 Conference.

== Previous season ==
The Horned Frogs finished the 2024–25 season 34–4, 16–2 Big 12 play to win the Big 12 regular season title. They also won the Big 12 tournament for the first time by defeating Colorado, West Virginia and Baylor. As a result, they received an automatic bid to the NCAA tournament for the first time since 2010 as a No. 2 seed in the Birmingham Region 3. There, they defeated Fairleigh Dickson and Louisville in the first and second rounds to advance to the sweet sixteen for the first time in program history. They defeated Notre Dame before losing to Texas in the elite eight. They had 34 wins in the regular season, the most wins in school history.

== Offseason ==
=== Departures ===
TCU departures
| Name | Number | Pos. | Height | Year | Hometown | Reason for departure |
|---|---|---|---|---|---|---|
| Madison Conner | 2 | G | 5'11" | Senior | Chandler, AZ | Graduated/2025 WNBA draft; selected 29th overall by Seattle Storm |
| Deasia Merrill | 3 | F | 6'1" | Graduate student | Villa Rica, GA | Graduated |
| Una Jovanovic | 5 | G | 5'9" | Senior | Santa Clara, CA | Graduated |
| Hailey Van Lith | 10 | G | 5'9" | Graduate student | Wenatchee, WA | Graduated/2025 WNBA draft; selected 11th overall by Chicago Sky |
| Knisha Godfrey | 11 | G | 5'9" | (redshirt) Junior | Columbus, OH | Transferred to Florida |
| Sedona Prince | 13 | C | 6'7" | Graduate student | Liberty Hill, TX | Graduated/2025 WNBA draft; signed to play professionally in Lebanon with Al Riyadi |
| Ella Hamlin | 20 | G | 5'9" | Sophomore | Granbury, TX | Transferred to Arkansas–Monticello |
| Agnes Emma-Nnopu | 21 | G | 5'11" | Graduate student | Ocean Grove, Australia | Graduated |
| DaiJa Turner | 24 | F | 6'3" | (redshirt) Junior | Fayetteville, NC | Transferred to Northwestern |

=== Incoming ===
TCU incoming transfers
| Name | Num | Pos. | Height | Year | Hometown | Previous school |
|---|---|---|---|---|---|---|
| Kennedy Basham | 0 | F | 6'7" | Senior | Phoenix, AZ | Arizona |
| Veronica Sheffey | 2 | G | 5'9" | Senior | Woodinville, WA | San Diego State |
| Olivia Miles | 5 | G | 5'6" | Graduate student | Phillipsburg, NJ | Notre Dame |
| Marta Suárez | 7 | F | 6'3" | Graduate student | Oviedo, Spain | California |
| Clara Silva | 17 | C | 6'7" | Sophomore | Faro, Portugal | Kentucky |
| Taliyah Parker | 21 | G | 6'1" | Sophomore | Grand Prairie, TX | Texas A&M |

=== 2025 recruiting class ===
College recruiting
| Name | Hometown | School | Height | Weight | Commit date |
|---|---|---|---|---|---|
| Emily Hunter; C | Nolensville, TN | Nolensville High School | 6 ft 8 in (2.03 m) | N/A | Oct 15, 2025 |
| Emily Hunter; C | Recruit ratings: 247Sports: | | | | |
Overall recruit ranking:
Note: In many cases, Scout, Rivals, 247Sports, On3, and ESPN may conflict in their listings of height and weight.; In these cases, the average was taken. ESPN grades are on a 100-point scale.; Sources: "2025 Player Commits". ESPN. Archived from the original on November 6, 2025.

== Roster ==
2025–26 TCU Horned Frogs women's basketball team
Players
Coaches

| Pos. | # | Name | Height | Year | Previous school | Hometown |
|---|---|---|---|---|---|---|
| C | 0 | Kennedy Basham | 6 ft 7 in (2.01 m) | Sr | PHH Prep; Arizona State | Phoenix, AZ |
| G | 1 | Taylor Bigby | 6 ft 1 in (1.85 m) | RS Sr | Centennial; USC | Las Vegas, NV |
| G | 2 | Veronica Sheffey | 5 ft 9 in (1.75 m) | Sr | Woodinville; San Diego State | Woodinville, WA |
| G | 4 | Donovyn Hunter | 6 ft 0 in (1.83 m) | Jr | South Medford; Oregon State | Medford, OR |
| G | 5 | Olivia Miles | 5 ft 10 in (1.78 m) | GS | Blair Academy; Notre Dame | Phillipsburg, NJ |
| G | 7 | Marta Suárez | 6 ft 3 in (1.91 m) | GS | Joaquim Blume Institute; California | Oviedo, Spain |
| F | 14 | Natalie Mazurek | 6 ft 2 in (1.88 m) | GS | Eden Prairie; South Dakota | Eden Prairie, MN |
| C | 15 | Sarah Portlock | 6 ft 8 in (2.03 m) | Fr | Centre of Excellence | Victoria, Australia |
| G | 16 | Clara Bielefeld | 6 ft 4 in (1.93 m) | Fr | Citybasket Recklinghausen | Recklinghausen, Germany |
| C | 17 | Clara Silva | 6 ft 7 in (2.01 m) | So | Escola Secundária de Fonseca Benevides; Kentucky | Faro, Portugal |
| G | 21 | Taliyah Parker | 6 ft 1 in (1.85 m) | So | South Grand Prairie; Texas A&M | Oklahoma City, OK |
| G | 22 | Maddie Scherr | 5 ft 10 in (1.78 m) | GS | Ryle; Kentucky | Florence, KY |
| F | 23 | Aaliyah Roberson | 6 ft 2 in (1.88 m) | Sr | Clark | San Antonio, TX |
| C | 44 | Emily Hunter | 6 ft 7 in (2.01 m) | Fr | TPLS Christian Academy | Nolensville, TN |

Head coach

- Mark Campbell (Hawaiʻi)

Assistant coach(es)

- Xavier López (Point Loma)
- Minyon Moore (Oregon)
- Nia Jackson (Oregon)
- Nolan Wilson (Prairie View A&M)
- Jessie Craig (Alaska–Anchorage)

Legend

- (C) Team captain
- (S) Suspended
- (I) Ineligible
- (W) Walk-on
- Injured
- Current redshirt

Roster

== Schedule and results ==
| Date time, TV | Rank^{#} | Opponent^{#} | Result | Record | High points | High rebounds | High assists | Site (attendance) city, state |
Regular season
| November 6, 2025*; 4:00 p.m., ESPN+ | No. 17 | North Carolina A&T | W 82–43 | 1–0 | 19 – Suárez | 8 – Tied | 6 – Miles | Schollmaier Arena (2,187); Fort Worth, TX |
| November 9, 2025*; 7:00 p.m., ESPN+ | No. 17 | Sam Houston | W 88–46 | 2–0 | 22 – Miles | 9 – Silva | 9 – Miles | Schollmaier Arena (2,302); Fort Worth, TX |
| November 12, 2025*; 6:30 p.m., ESPN+ | No. 17 | Tennessee State | W 122–39 | 3–0 | 22 – Scherr | 11 – Miles | 11 – Miles | Schollmaier Arena (2,476); Fort Worth, TX |
| November 16, 2025*; 12:00 p.m., ESPN | No. 17 | at No. 10 NC State | W 69–59 | 4–0 | 26 – Suarez | 14 – Miles | 5 – Miles | Reynolds Coliseum (5,500); Raleigh, NC |
| November 20, 2025*; 6:30 p.m., ESPN+ | No. 10 | Tarleton State | W 80–32 | 5–0 | 20 – Suárez | 10 – Suárez | 7 – Miles | Schollmaier Arena (2,849); Fort Worth, TX |
| November 23, 2025*; 4:00 p.m., ESPN+ | No. 10 | UTRGV; Maggie Dixon Classic | W 93–57 | 6–0 | 24 – Suárez | 11 – Silva | 7 – Miles | Schollmaier Arena (2,409); Fort Worth, TX |
| November 27, 2025*; 8:00 p.m., FloCollege | No. 8 | vs. Richmond; Cancún Challenge Yucatan Tournament | W 68–52 | 7–0 | 24 – Suarez | 8 – Tied | 6 – Miles | Hard Rock Hotel Riviera Maya (175); Cancún, Mexico |
| November 28, 2025*; 5:30 p.m., FloCollege | No. 8 | vs. UAB; Cancún Challenge Yucatan Tournament | W 82–61 | 8–0 | 19 – Suarez | 8 – Silva | 6 – Miles | Hard Rock Hotel Riviera Maya; Cancún, Mexico |
| December 3, 2025*; 6:30 p.m., ESPN+ | No. 8 | Incarnate Word | W 84–56 | 9–0 | 21 – D. Hunter | 12 – Suarez | 8 – Scherr | Schollmaier Arena (2,191); Fort Worth, TX |
| December 6, 2025*; 1:00 p.m., ESPN+ | No. 8 | UTEP | W 95–40 | 10–0 | 21 – Scherr | 10 – Miles | 11 – Miles | Schollmaier Arena (2,846); Fort Worth, TX |
| December 14, 2025*; 6:30 p.m., ESPN+ | No. 8 | Jacksonville | W 89–49 | 11–0 | 21 – Silva | 11 – Miles | 10 – Miles | Schollmaier Arena (2,540); Fort Worth, TX |
| December 16, 2025*; 6:30 p.m., ESPN+ | No. 9 | Arkansas–Pine Bluff | W 109–54 | 12–0 | 25 – Miles | 10 – Tied | 11 – Miles | Schollmaier Arena (2,063); Fort Worth, TX |
| December 20, 2025; 4:00 p.m., ESPN+ | No. 9 | Kansas State | W 77–55 | 13–0 (1–0) | 29 – Miles | 10 – Silva | 4 – Tied | Schollmaier Arena (3,627); Fort Worth, TX |
| December 31, 2025; 8:00 p.m., ESPN+ | No. 8т | at BYU | W 72–48 | 14–0 (2–0) | 15 – Silva | 12 – Miles | 10 – Miles | Marriott Center (3,661); Provo, UT |
| January 3, 2026; 8:00 p.m., ESPN+ | No. 8т | at Utah | L 77–87 ^{OT} | 14–1 (2–1) | 31 – Miles | 11 – Suarez | 7 – Miles | Jon M. Huntsman Center (2,731); Salt Lake City, UT |
| January 7, 2026; 6:30 p.m., ESPN+ | No. 13 | Oklahoma State | W 69–61 | 15–1 (3–1) | 20 – Miles | 7 – Silva | 8 – Miles | Schollmaier Arena (2,827); Fort Worth, TX |
| January 11, 2026; 4:00 p.m., ESPN+ | No. 13 | Arizona State | W 77–46 | 16–1 (4–1) | 20 – Miles | 7 – Silva | 8 – Miles | Schollmaier Arena (2,827); Fort Worth, TX |
| January 14, 2026; 6:00 p.m., ESPN+ | No. 10 | at West Virginia | W 51–50 | 17–1 (5–1) | 14 – Miles | 9 – Suarez | 1 – Tied | Hope Coliseum (3,733); Morgantown, WV |
| January 17, 2026; 4:00 p.m., ESPN+ | No. 10 | Arizona | W 78–62 | 18–1 (6–1) | 16 – Miles | 11 – Silva | 7 – Miles | Schollmaier Arena (3,578); Fort Worth, TX |
| January 19, 2026*; 11:00 a.m., FOX | No. 9 | vs. No. 12 Ohio State; Coretta Scott King Classic | L 69–72 | 18–2 | 24 – Miles | 11 – Miles | 7 – Miles | Prudential Center (6,742); Newark, NJ |
| January 24, 2026; 1:00 p.m., ESPN+ | No. 9 | at UCF | W 67–50 | 19–2 (7–1) | 17 – Miles | 10 – Silva | 6 – Miles | Addition Financial Arena (1,256); Orlando, FL |
| January 29, 2026; 5:00 p.m., ESPN | No. 12 | Kansas | W 79–77 | 20–2 (8–1) | 20 – Miles | 8 – Suarez | 6 – Miles | Schollmaier Arena (2,613); Fort Worth, TX |
| February 1, 2026; 1:00 p.m., FS1 | No. 12 | at No. 21 Texas Tech | L 60–62 | 20–3 (8–2) | 15 – Tied | 12 – Suarez | 4 – Miles | United Supermarkets Arena (6,206); Lubbock, TX |
| February 4, 2026; 6:30 p.m., ESPN+ | No. 14 | Houston | W 90–45 | 21–3 (9–2) | 25 – Miles | 10 – Suarez | 6 – Miles | Schollmaier Arena (2,968); Fort Worth, TX |
| February 8, 2026; 2:00 p.m., ESPN+ | No. 14 | at Colorado | L 79–80 | 21–4 (9–3) | 31 – Miles | 5 – Tied | 2 – Tied | CU Events Center (2,240); Boulder, CO |
| February 12, 2026; 6:00 p.m., ESPN | No. 17 | at No. 12 Baylor | W 83–67 | 22–4 (10–3) | 40 – Miles | 8 – Silva | 4 – Suarez | Foster Pavilion (5,758); Waco, TX |
| February 15, 2026; 7:00 p.m., FS1 | No. 17 | No. 19 West Virginia | W 59–50 | 23–4 (11–3) | 14 – Tied | 8 – Silva | 7 – Miles | Schollmaier Arena (4,931); Fort Worth, TX |
| February 18, 2026; 6:30 p.m., ESPN+ | No. 12 | at Houston | W 72–50 | 24–4 (12–3) | 21 – Suarez | 9 – Suarez | 4 – Tied | Fertitta Center (1,098); Houston, TX |
| February 22, 2026; 3:00 p.m., ESPN | No. 12 | Iowa State | W 80–73 | 25–4 (13–3) | 26 – Miles | 10 – Tied | 10 – Miles | Schollmaier Arena (5,381); Fort Worth, TX |
| February 25, 2026; 5:30 p.m., ESPN+ | No. 11 | at Cincinnati | W 83–70 | 26–4 (14–3) | 32 – Suarez | 10 – Basham | 8 – Miles | Fifth Third Arena (2,307); Cincinnati, OH |
| March 1, 2026; 3:00 p.m., ESPN | No. 11 | No. 18 Baylor | W 65–53 | 27–4 (15–3) | 21 – Suarez | 11 – Suarez | 4 – Suarez | Schollmaier Arena (6,330); Fort Worth, TX |
Big 12 Conference tournament
| March 6, 2026; 1:30 p.m., ESPNU | (1) No. 10 | vs. (9) BYU; Quarterfinals | W 63–46 | 28–4 | 17 – Suarez | 10 – Miles | 6 – Miles | T-Mobile Center (3,812); Kansas City, MO |
| March 7, 2026; 3:00 p.m., ESPN+ | (1) No. 10 | vs. (12) Kansas State; Semifinals | W 74–62 | 29–4 | 22 – Suarez | 11 – Suarez | 3 – Miles | T-Mobile Center (6,905); Kansas City, MO |
| March 7, 2026; 4:00 p.m., ESPN | (1) No. 10 | vs. (2) No. 15 West Virginia; Championship | L 53–62 | 29–5 | 17 – Miles | 8 – Suarez | 4 – Tied | T-Mobile Center (5,857); Kansas City, MO |
NCAA tournament
| March 20, 2026*; 11:00 a.m., ESPN | (3 S4) No. 14 | (14 S4) UC San Diego; First Round | W 86–40 | 30–5 | 27 – Bigby | 16 – Miles | 14 – Miles | Schollmaier Arena; Fort Worth, TX |
| March 22, 2026*; 9:00 p.m., ESPN | (3 S4) No. 14 | (6 S4) Washington; Second Round | W 62–59 ^{OT} | 31–5 | 18 – Miles | 10 – Miles | 8 – Miles | Schollmaier Arena (4,822); Fort Worth, TX |
| March 28, 2026*; 6:30 p.m., ESPN | (3 S4) No. 14 | vs. (10 S4) Virginia; Sweet Sixteen | W 79–69 | 32–5 | 33 – Suarez | 10 – Suarez | 8 – Miles | Golden 1 Center (9,583); Sacramento, CA |
| March 30, 2026*; 8:00 p.m., ESPN | (3 S4) No. 14 | vs. (1 S4) No. 4 South Carolina; Elite Eight | L 52–78 | 32–6 | 18 – Miles | 5 – Tied | 6 – Miles | Golden 1 Center (8,558); Sacramento, CA |
*Non-conference game. ^{#}Rankings from AP poll. (#) Tournament seedings in parentheses. S4=Sacramento 4. All times are in Central.

== Rankings ==
Ranking movements Legend: ██ Increase in ranking ██ Decrease in ranking т = Tied with team above or below
| | Week | | | | | | | | | | | | | | | | | | | | |
| Poll | Pre | 1 | 2 | 3 | 4 | 5 | 6 | 7 | 8 | 9 | 10 | 11 | 12 | 13 | 14 | 15 | 16 | 17 | 18 | 19 | Final |
|---|---|---|---|---|---|---|---|---|---|---|---|---|---|---|---|---|---|---|---|---|---|
| AP | 17 | 17 | 10 | 8 | 8 | 8 | 9 | 8т | 8т* | 13 | 10 | 9 | 12 | 14 | 17 | 12 | 11 | 10 | 14 | 14 | Not released |
| Coaches | 12 | 12т | 8 | 7 | 7 | 7 | 7 | 7 | 7 | 10 | 8 | 9 | 10 | 12 | 14 | 11 | 10 | 10 | 12 | 12 | |

*AP did not release a week 8 poll.

== See also ==
- 2025–26 TCU Horned Frogs men's basketball team
