= JR Payne =

American college basketball coach (born 1977)

Current position
- Title: Head coach
- Team: Colorado
- Conference: Big 12
- Record: 186–128 (.592)

Biographical details
- Born: May 27, 1977 (age 49); Jackson, Tennessee, U.S.

Playing career
- 1995–1999: Saint Mary's
- Position: Guard

Coaching career (HC unless noted)
- 2000–2005: Gonzaga (asst.)
- 2005–2008: Boise State (asst.)
- 2008–2009: Santa Clara (asst.)
- 2009–2014: Southern Utah
- 2014–2016: Santa Clara
- 2016–present: Colorado

Head coaching record
- Overall: 287–241 (.544)

Ali-Marie "JR" Payne (born May 27, 1977) is an American college basketball coach who is currently head women's coach at Colorado.

== Early life and education ==
Ali-Marie Payne was born in the American city of Jackson, Tennessee and raised in the Canadian city of North Vancouver, British Columbia. Her father nicknamed her after J. R. Ewing, a character on the TV show Dallas. She attended Windsor Secondary School in North Vancouver.

Payne attended Saint Mary's College, where she would play point guard for the Saint Mary's Gaels from 1995 to 1999. During her senior season, Payne helped lead the Gaels to their first ever NCAA Tournament appearance. She earned two first-team All-West Coast Conference honor. In 1999, Payne graduated from Saint Mary's with a degree in French, then attended San Francisco State University for a year for graduate school.

== Coaching career ==
=== Assistant coach (2000–2005) ===
In 2000, Payne began her women's basketball coaching career at Gonzaga under Kelly Graves. The team improved from five wins in 2000–01 to 28 wins in the 2004-05 season, including a perfect record in West Coast Conference play. Payne helped recruit guard Shannon Mathews, who would become the first All-American in program history.

In 2005, Payne became an assistant coach at Boise State under Gordy Presnell. During her time as assistant, Boise State won Western Athletic Conference titles two of her three years and made the NCAA Tournament. Boise State finished 24-8 twice in a row, including a perfect 14-0 home record in the 2007-08 season.

=== Southern Utah (2009–2014) ===
In 2009, Payne got her first head coaching opportunity at Southern Utah. Payne was head coach at Southern Utah for five seasons. During her time as head coach for the Thunderbirds, the school transitioned from competing in the Summit League to the Big Sky Conference. Payne led Southern Utah team to two winning seasons, including a record 23-win season, Big Sky Conference regular-season co-championship, and first-ever postseason appearance in program history in the 2014 Women's National Invitation Tournament.

Payne finished her career at Southern Utah with only two winning seasons out of five. Her teams did manage an overall winning 24-16 record in Summit League and Big Sky play.

=== Santa Clara (2014–2016) ===
On April 6, 2014, Payne became head coach at Santa Clara. Payne was head coach at Santa Clara for two seasons competing in the WCC Conference. Payne led Santa Clara to a 23-win season in 2015–16, and the Santa Clara Broncos made the WNIT returning to the postseason for the first time in ten years.

Payne finished her career at Santa Clara with her teams managing an overall 18-18 record in WCC Conference play.

Following Santa Clara's exit from the WNIT, Payne was offered the head coach position at the University of Colorado-Boulder (Pac-12), The University of Arizona (Pac-12), and the University of New Mexico (Mountain West).

=== Colorado (2016–present) ===
On March 28, 2016, Payne became head coach at Colorado. The eighth head coach in program history, Payne replaced Linda Lappe, who was fired after only managing a career 33–57 (.367) record in Pac-12 play. The program finished 7-23 (2-16 Pac-12) in Lappe's final season.

Payne inherited a program that had a lack of player talent. The Buffs were only 14–58 (.194) in the last four years of Lappe's coaching tenure in Pac-12 play, despite having a player that would go on to become the program's all-time assists leader. Colorado finished the 2018–19 season with just a 2–16 Pac-12 record. In its 45-year history, it marked the fifth time that the Buffs failed to win at least three conference games. Payne's 2018–19 Colorado team began Pac-12 conference play 0–11, the worst start to conference play in program history. The 102–43 loss at Oregon was the Buffs' worst loss since 1984 and it was the 4th-worst loss in program history.

Before the start of the 2019–20 season, the Buffs were anticipated to continue to struggle, and picked to finish last place in the Pac-12 Women's Basketball Coaches poll by fellow Pac-12 coaches. Yet, Payne and her staff invested in completely remaking the culture of the Colorado Buffs women's basketball team and the team bought in. The Buffs finally turned the corner from the program's struggles to play at a competitive level within the Pac-12 conference. The Buffs put a scare into #6th ranked Stanford, taking the Cardinal to overtime. Colorado had the attention of #8th ranked UCLA, having a chance to tie the game on the last possession. Colorado again played competitively vs Stanford, but lost on a crucial turnover. Colorado upset #11th-ranked Arizona on February 23, 2020, to get their fifth Pac-12 win on the season. It marked the first win over a ranked opponent since 2016 and stopped a 32-game losing streak against ranked opponents.

Through five seasons as head coach of the University of Colorado women's basketball team, Payne only managed 19 total conference wins. She has a career 19–59 (.244) conference record in Pac-12 play, losing about three conference games for every conference game won. Previous head coach at CU Lappe had 37 conference wins in her first five seasons.

Entering the 2020–21 season, the Pac-12 women's conference coaches voted in their pre-season poll that Colorado would finish near the bottom of the Pac-12 once again, with a predicted 9th-place finish. For the second season in a row, Colorado had multiple first quarters where they came out flat and struggled offensively. The CU Buffs only managed 8 total points in the first quarter against Washington State on January 3, 2021, matching the 8 total points in the first quarter against UCLA on February 28, 2020.

== Personal life ==
Payne is married to assistant coach Toriano Towns and they have three children together: Aliyah, Jordan, and Jaxton.

== Head coaching record ==
Record table
Season	Team	Overall	Conference	Standing	Postseason
Southern Utah Thunderbirds (Summit League) (2009–2012)
2009–10	Southern Utah	7–23	5–13	8th	
2010–11	Southern Utah	16–14	10–8	5th	
2011–12	Southern Utah	6–23	2–16	10th	
Southern Utah (Summit):		29–60 (.326)	17–37 (.315)		
Southern Utah Thunderbirds (Big Sky Conference) (2012–2014)
2012–13	Southern Utah	15–16	9–11	7th	
2013–14	Southern Utah	23–10	15–5	T–1st	WNIT Second Round
Southern Utah (Big Sky):		38–26 (.594)	24–16 (.600)		
Southern Utah (Overall):		67–86 (.438)	41–53 (.436)		
Santa Clara Broncos (West Coast Conference) (2014–2016)
2014–15	Santa Clara	11–18	5–13	7th	
2015–16	Santa Clara	23–9	13–5	T–3rd	WNIT First Round
Santa Clara:		34–27 (.557)	18–18 (.500)		
Colorado Buffaloes (Pac-12 Conference) (2016–2024)
2016–17	Colorado	17–16	5–13	T–9th	WNIT Third Round
2017–18	Colorado	15–16	5–13	9th	
2018–19	Colorado	12–18	2–16	12th	
2019–20	Colorado	16–14	5–13	T–9th	
2020–21	Colorado	12–11	8–8	6th	WNIT Quarterfinal
2021–22	Colorado	22–9	9–7	5th	NCAA First Round
2022–23	Colorado	25–9	13–5	3rd	NCAA Sweet Sixteen
2023–24	Colorado	24–10	11–7	T–5th	NCAA Sweet Sixteen
Colorado Buffaloes (Big 12 Conference) (2024–present)
2024–25	Colorado	21–13	9–9	9th	WBIT Second Round
2025–26	Colorado	22–12	11–7	6th	NCAA First Round
Colorado:		186–128 (.592)	78–98 (.443)		
Total:		287–241 (.544)			
National champion Postseason invitational champion Conference regular season champion Conference regular season and conference tournament champion Division regular season champion Division regular season and conference tournament champion Conference tournament champion
