= 2020–21 Serie A2 women's basketball season =

- League: Lega Basket Femminile
- Sport: Basketball
- Duration: October 3, 2020 – May 23, 2021
- Number of teams: 28

League

Seasons
- ← 2019–20 2021–22 →

The Serie A2 women's basketball championship 2020–2021 is the forty-first organized in Italy.

== Season ==
=== Announcements ===
The number of clubs has dropped to 28. Since Serie A1 there have been no relegations. Magnolia Campob is admitted to the A1. They renounce the category Giants Marghera, Bk. Ariano Irpino, High School Bk Lab and Ants Viterbo, replaced by Pall. Bolzano, Alma Patti, P.F. Florence and Brixia.

=== Formula ===
According to the Annual Organizational Provisions, the 28 participating teams are divided into two groups of 14 teams respectively on a partially geographical basis. A regular season is played with round-trip matches. At the end of the First Phase, the first 8 teams of each group are admitted to the promotion Play-offs, from which two teams are promoted to Serie A1. Each round of Play-off is played at the best of three races.

The four teams classified from 10th to 13th place in each group are admitted to the Play Outs – best of three games – which decree two relegations to Serie B. The teams classified 14th in each group are relegated directly to Serie B.
