= Jade Masogayo =

American basketball player (born 2004)

Personal information
- Born: July 17, 2004 (age 22) Fort Worth, Texas, U.S.
- Listed height: 6 ft 3 in (1.91 m)

Career information
- High school: Fossil Ridge High School (Fort Worth, Texas)
- College: Missouri State (2022–2024); Colorado (2024–2026)
- WNBA draft: 2026: undrafted
- Playing career: 2026–present
- Position: Forward

Career history
- 2026: Minnesota Lynx

Career highlights
- All-Big 12 Second Team (2025); MVC Freshman of the Year (2023); MVC All-Freshman Team (2023)
- Stats at WNBA.com
- Stats at Basketball Reference

Jade Masogayo (born July 17, 2004) is an American basketball player who played college basketball for the Colorado Buffaloes and the Missouri State Lady Bears. She is currently an unrestricted free agent in the Women's National Basketball Association (WNBA). Having a Belgian mother, she was selected for the Belgian Cats, the Belgian National basketball team.

== Early life ==
Masogayo was born on July 17, 2004, in Fort Worth, Texas. She attended Fossil Ridge High School in Fort Worth, Texas, where she played basketball. As a senior, she averaged 13.5 points and 9.7 rebounds per game and was named Defensive Player of the Year on the Fort Worth Star-Telegram all-area team. She also earned all-district honors during her high school career. In addition, she was named the District 4-6A Defensive Player of the Year in 2021 and 2022. Following her high school career, she committed to play college basketball at Missouri State.

== College career ==
=== Missouri State ===
Masogayo began her college career with the Missouri State Lady Bears. As a freshman in the 2022–23 season, she averaged 8.0 points and 5.4 rebounds per game while leading the team in field goal percentage. She was named Missouri Valley Conference Freshman of the Year and earned Missouri Valley Conference All-Freshman Team honors.

Entering her sophomore season, she was named to the preseason All-Missouri Valley Conference second team. She went on to average 8.4 points and 4.5 rebounds per game during the 2023–24 season. Following the season, she entered the transfer portal. She later committed to Colorado.

=== Colorado ===
Masogayo transferred to the Colorado Buffaloes following the 2023–24 season. During the 2024–25 season, she led the team with a career-high 12.5 points per game while also ranking 12th in the NCAA with a field goal percentage of 59.9%. Following this season, she earned All-Big 12 honorable mention honors.

As a senior in the 2025–26 season, she averaged 11.3 points and 4.9 rebounds per game. Following the season, she was named to the All-Big 12 Second Team.

== Professional career ==
=== WNBA ===
==== Minnesota Lynx (2026) ====
Masogayo signed a training camp contract with the Minnesota Lynx of the Women's National Basketball Association (WNBA) as an undrafted free agent in April 2026. She was waived by the Lynx on May 2, 2026, before the start of the 2026 regular season.

== Career statistics ==
Legend
GP	Games played	GS	Games started	MPG	Minutes per game	FG%	Field goal percentage
FT%	Free throw percentage	RPG	Rebounds per game	APG	Assists per game	BPG	Blocks per game
TO	Turnovers per game	PPG	Points per game	**Bold**	Career high	°	League leader

=== College ===
NCAA statistics
Season	Team	GP	GS	MPG	FG%	FT%	RPG	APG	BPG	TO	PPG
2022–23	Missouri State	32	3	21.7	.526	.521	**5.4**	1.6	**1.4**	2.3	8.0
2023–24	Missouri State	32	32	22.8	.500	.696	4.5	1.6	0.9	**1.8**	8.4
2024–25	Colorado	**33**	**33**	22.7	**.599**	.638	4.8	1.4	1.2	2.6	**12.5**
2025–26	Colorado	**33**	**33**	**26.3**	.489	**.757**	4.9	**1.8**	0.8	2.5	11.3
**Career**		130	101	23.4	.531	.669	4.9	1.6	1.0	2.3	10.1
