= Serie A2 (women's basketball) =

- Organising body: Lega Basket Femminile
- Founded: 1980
- Replaced by: Serie A1
- Country: Italy
- Confederation: FIP
- Number of teams: 28
- Relegation to: Serie B
- Current champions: Costa Masnaga, Verga Palermo, Progresso Bologna (2020-21)
- Website: www.legabasketfemminile.it
- 2022–23 Serie A2 women's basketball season

Serie A2 is the second division of the Italian women's basketball championship. It was born together with Serie A1 in 1980-81 from the splitting of Serie A.

== Formula ==
According to regulation, as the 2020-21 season the 28 participating teams are divided into two groups of 14 teams on a geographical basis. A First Phase is disputed with round trip matches.

At the end of the First Phase, the teams classified from the first to the eighth place of each group are admitted to the Play Offs which designate the team admitted to the promotion play-off for Serie A1. Each round of Play Off is played at the best of three races.

The teams classified from tenth to 13th place compete in the Play Outs which decree 2 relegations to Serie B. The last classified of the two groups are relegated directly to Serie B.
