= Linda Lappe =

American college basketball coach (born 1980)

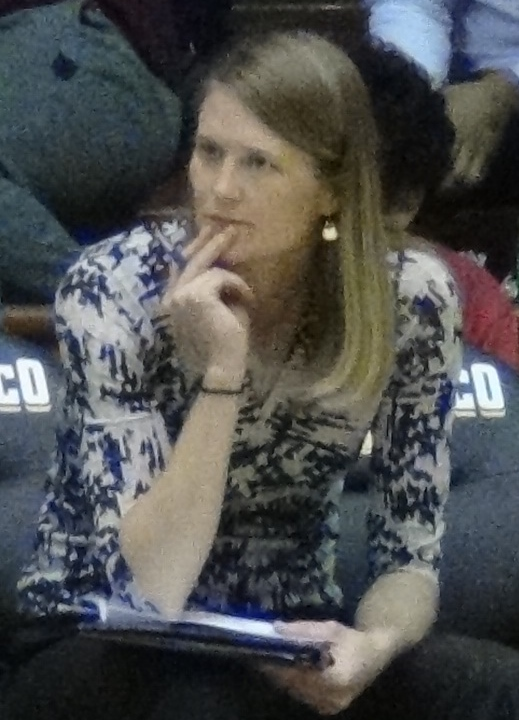
- Lappe in 2016 at Kezar Pavilion.

Current position
- Title: Senior Associate Athletic Director
- Team: San Francisco
- Conference: WCC

Biographical details
- Born: February 26, 1980 (age 46); Burlington, Iowa

Playing career
- 1998–2003: Colorado
- Position: Guard

Coaching career (HC unless noted)
- 2003–2006: Drake (asst.)
- 2006–2007: Colorado State (asst.)
- 2007–2010: Metro State
- 2010–2016: Colorado
- 2016–2017: San Francisco (asst.)

Administrative career (AD unless noted)
- 2019–present: San Francisco (sr. asso. AD)

Head coaching record
- Overall: 148–105 (.585)
- Tournaments: 0–1 (NCAA); 6–4 (WNIT)

Linda Marie Lappe (born February 26, 1980) is an American college basketball coach who most recently was women's basketball head coach at Colorado.

== Early life and education ==
Born in Burlington, Iowa, Lappe grew up in nearby Morning Sun and attended Winfield-Mt. Union High School in Winfield.

As a freshman at Colorado in 1998–99 playing under coach Ceal Barry, Lappe led the team in scoring with 10.7 points per game. She redshirted the next season due to injuring her patella during the home opener. Lappe returned in 2000–01 as a redshirt sophomore averaging 7.0 points and 2.9 rebounds in 30 games (six starts).

As a junior in 2001–02, Lappe played 22 games and averaged 4.6 points and 2.9 points, after missing the first 11 games due to ankle surgery. In her senior season of 2002–03, Lappe started 31 of 32 games and averaged 8.4 points and 4.4 rebounds.

== Career statistics ==
Legend
GP	Games played	GS	Games started	MPG	Minutes per game	RPG	Rebounds per game
APG	Assists per game	SPG	Steals per game	BPG	Blocks per game	PPG	Points per game
TO	Turnovers per game	FG%	Field-goal percentage	3P%	3-point field-goal percentage	FT%	Free-throw percentage
**Bold**	Career best	°	League leader

=== College ===
Year	Team	GP	GS	MPG	FG%	3P%	FT%	RPG	APG	SPG	BPG	TO	PPG
1998–99	Colorado	29	-	-	43.3	37.5	82.7	4.4	**3.8**	**1.7**	0.2	-	**10.7**
1999–00	Colorado	2	-	-	33.3	**100.0**	**100.0**	**5.5**	2.5	0.0	0.0	-	5.5
2000–01	Colorado	30	-	-	42.9	23.8	85.9	2.9	2.4	0.9	0.1	-	7.0
2001–02	Colorado	22	-	-	42.5	16.7	80.0	2.9	1.6	0.8	0.2	-	4.6
2002–03	Colorado	**32**	-	27.8	**48.1**	25.0	84.3	4.4	3.0	1.2	**0.3**	2.1	8.4
**Career**		115	-	27.8	44.3	31.5	83.9	3.7	2.8	1.1	0.2	2.1	7.8
Statistics retrieved from Sports-Reference.

== Coaching career ==
Lappe began her coaching career back in Iowa as an assistant at Drake University, a position she held from 2003 to 2006. After one season as an assistant at Colorado State, Lappe was head coach at Division II Metro State from 2007 to 2010.

In six seasons at Colorado, she compiled a record of 104-85 and guided the Buffaloes to the 2013 NCAA Women's Division I Basketball Tournament and to the WNIT in 3 other seasons. After a 7–23 season in 2015–16, Lappe resigned.
On October 18, 2016, the University of San Francisco hired Lappe as women's basketball associate head coach.
After leaving San Francisco for 2 years, Lappe returns to San Franicsco as a senior associate athletic director.

== Head coaching record ==
Record table
Season	Team	Overall	Conference	Standing	Postseason
Metro State Roadrunners (Rocky Mountain Athletic Conference) (2007–2010)
2007–08	Metro State	19–10	13–6	2nd (East)	
2008–09	Metro State	14–14	12–7	3rd (East)	
2009–10	Metro State	17–12	11–8	3rd (East)	
Metro State:		50–36 (.581)	36–21 (.632)		
Colorado Buffaloes (Big 12 Conference) (2010–2011)
2010–11	Colorado	18–16	6–10	8th	WNIT Quarterfinals
Colorado Buffaloes (Pac–12 Conference) (2011–2016)
2011–12	Colorado	21–14	6–12	10th	WNIT Semifinals
2012–13	Colorado	25–7	13–5	4th	NCAA First Round
2013–14	Colorado	19–15	6–12	T–9th	WNIT Quarterfinals
2014–15	Colorado	15–17	6–12	T–9th	
2015–16	Colorado	7–23	2–16	12th	
Colorado:		105–92 (.533)	39–67 (.368)		
Total:		155–128 (.548)			
National champion Postseason invitational champion Conference regular season champion Conference regular season and conference tournament champion Division regular season champion Division regular season and conference tournament champion Conference tournament champion
