= 2024–25 Colorado Buffaloes women's basketball team =

American college basketball season

2024–25 Colorado Buffaloes women's basketball

WBIT, Second Round
- Conference: Big 12 Conference
- Record: 21–13 (9–9 Big 12)
- Head coach: JR Payne (9th season)
- Assistant coaches: Toriano Towns; Alex Earl; Tim Hays
- Home arena: CU Events Center

2024–25 Big 12 Conference women's basketball standings
	Conf.				Overall
Team	W		L	PCT	W		L	PCT
No. 6 TCU †	16	–	2	.889	34	–	4	.895
No. 14 Baylor	15	–	3	.833	28	–	8	.778
No. 17 Oklahoma State	14	–	4	.778	25	–	7	.781
No. 16 West Virginia	13	–	5	.722	25	–	8	.758
No. 19 Kansas State	13	–	5	.722	28	–	8	.778
Utah	13	–	5	.722	22	–	9	.710
Iowa State	12	–	6	.667	23	–	12	.657
Arizona	10	–	8	.556	19	–	14	.576
Colorado	9	–	9	.500	21	–	13	.618
Cincinnati	7	–	11	.389	15	–	14	.517
Kansas	6	–	12	.333	16	–	14	.533
BYU	4	–	14	.222	13	–	17	.433
UCF	4	–	14	.222	12	–	18	.400
Texas Tech	4	–	14	.222	19	–	18	.514
Arizona State	3	–	15	.167	10	–	22	.313
Houston	1	–	17	.056	5	–	25	.167
† 2025 Big 12 tournament winner Rankings from AP poll

The 2024–25 Colorado Buffaloes women's basketball team represented the University of Colorado Boulder during the 2024–25 NCAA Division I women's basketball season. The Buffaloes were led by ninth year head coach JR Payne and played their home games at the CU Events Center. This season is Colorado's first season as members of the Big 12 Conference since 2011 after they rejoined the conference in August 2024.

== Previous season ==
The Buffaloes finished the season 25–10, 11–7 in Pac-12 play to finish in fifth place. They defeated Oregon in the First Round of the Pac-12 women's tournament before losing to Oregon State in the quarterfinals. Colorado received an at-large bid to the NCAA Women's Tournament where they defeated Drake in the First Round and Kansas State in the Second Round before losing to Iowa in the Sweet Sixteen.

== Offseason ==
=== Departures ===
Colorado Departures
Name	Num	Pos.	Height	Year	Hometown	Reason for Departure
Jaylyn Sherrod	0	G	5'7"	GS Senior	Birmingham, AL	Graduated/signed to the New York Liberty.
Jadyn Atchison	1	G	6'1"	Freshman	Cedar Hill, TX	Transferred to Old Dominion.
Tameiya Sadler	2	G	5'8"	Senior	Vallejo, CA	Transferred to Ole Miss.
Quay Miller	11	F	6'3"	GS Senior	Renton, WA	Graduated/signed to the Seattle Storm.
Lele Tanuvasa	13	G	6'0"	Freshman	Eureka, CA	Transferred to USC Upstate.
Aaronette Vonleh	21	C	6'3"	Junior	West Linn, OR	Transferred to Baylor.
Shelomi Sanders	22	G	6'1"	(redshirt) Freshman	Rockwall, TX	Transferred to Alabama A&M.
Mikayla Johnson	23	G	6'1"	(redshirt) Freshman	Anchorage, AK	Transferred to Pittsburgh.
Maddie Nolan	24	G	5'11"	GS Senior	Zionsville, IN	Graduated.
Brianna McLeod	25	F	6'3"	Sophomore	Brampton, ON	Transferred to SMU.
Sophie Gerber	31	G	6'0"	Junior	Scottsdale, AZ	Graduated.
Ruthie Loomis-Goltl	32	F	6'3"	Freshman	Bridgeport, NE	Transferred to South Dakota.
Charlotte Whittaker	45	F	6'3"	GS Senior	Cust, New Zealand	Graduated/signed to the South West Metro Pirates.

=== Incoming ===
Colorado incoming transfers
Name	Num	Pos.	Height	Year	Hometown	Previous School
Ayianna Johnson	1	F	6'3	Sophomore	Jefferson, WI	Minnesota
JoJo Nworie	4	C	6'5	Sophomore	Lagos, Nigeria	Texas Tech
Nyamer Diew	11	F	6'2	GS Senior	Marshall, MN	Iowa State
Lior Garzon	12	F	6'1	GS Senior	Ra'anana, Israel	Oklahoma State
Jade Masogayo	14	F	6'3	Junior	Fort Worth, TX	Missouri State
Johanna Teder	21	G	5'8	GS Senior	Tartu, Estonia	Washington State

==== Recruiting ====
College recruiting information (2024)
Name	Hometown	School	Height	Weight	Commit date
Tabitha Betson; F	Melbourne, Australia	DME Academy	6 ft 2 in (1.88 m)	N/A	
Tabitha Betson; F	Recruit ratings: ESPN: (94)				
Grace Oliver; F	Norwell, MA	Noble and Greenough School	6 ft 1 in (1.85 m)	N/A	
Grace Oliver; F	Recruit ratings: ESPN: (92)				
Lova Lagerlid; G	Stockholm, Sweden	Riksbasketgymnasiet Luleå	6 ft 0 in (1.83 m)	N/A	
Lova Lagerlid; G	Recruit ratings: No ratings found				
Erin Powell; F	Hampshire, England	Charnwood College	6 ft 0 in (1.83 m)	N/A	
Erin Powell; F	Recruit ratings: No ratings found				
Overall recruit ranking:
Note: In many cases, Scout, Rivals, 247Sports, On3, and ESPN may conflict in their listings of height and weight.; In these cases, the average was taken. ESPN grades are on a 100-point scale.; Sources: "2024 Player Commits". ESPN. Archived from the original on September 29, 2024.

== Roster ==
2024–25 Colorado Buffaloes women's basketball team
Players
Coaches

Pos.	#	Name	Height	Year	Previous school	Hometown
F	1	Ayianna Johnson	6 ft 3 in (1.91 m)	So	Jefferson; Minnesota	Jefferson, WI
G	2	Kennedy Sanders	5 ft 8 in (1.73 m)	RS Fr	Chaska HS	Chaska, MN
G	3	Frida Formann	5 ft 11 in (1.8 m)	GS	Falkonergårdens Gymnasium	Bagsværd, Denmark
C	4	JoJo Nworie	6 ft 5 in (1.96 m)	So	Texas Tech	Lagos, Nigeria
F	8	Erin Powell	6 ft 0 in (1.83 m)	Fr	Charnwood College	Hampshire, England
G	9	Sara-Rose Smith	6 ft 1 in (1.85 m)	GS	BA Centre of Excellence; Missouri	Victoria, Australia
G	10	Lova Lagerlid	6 ft 0 in (1.83 m)	Fr	Riksbasketgymnasiet Luleå	Stockholm, Sweden
F	11	Nyamer Diew	6 ft 2 in (1.88 m)	GS	East HS; Iowa State	Marshall, MN
F	12	Lior Garzon	6 ft 1 in (1.85 m)	GS	Hof HaSharon; Oklahoma State	Ra'anana, Israel
F	14	Jade Masogayo	6 ft 3 in (1.91 m)	Jr	Fossil Ridge HS; Missouri State	Fort Worth, TX
G	15	Kindyll Wetta	5 ft 9 in (1.75 m)	Sr	Valor Christian HS	Castle Rock, CO
F	17	Tabitha Betson	6 ft 2 in (1.88 m)	Fr	DME Academy	Melbourne, Australia
G	21	Johanna Teder	5 ft 8 in (1.73 m)	GS	Audentese spordigümnaasium Washington State	Tartu, Estonia
F	24	Grace Oliver	6 ft 1 in (1.85 m)	Fr	Noble and Greenough School	Norwell, MA

Head coach

- JR Payne (Saint Mary's)

Assistant coach(es)

- Toriano Towns (Saint Mary's)
- Alex Earl (Arizona State)
- Taelor Karr (Gonzaga)
- Matt Hower (Colorado State)
- Shelley Sheetz (Colorado)

Legend

- (C) Team captain
- (S) Suspended
- (I) Ineligible
- (W) Walk-on
- Injured
- Current redshirt

Roster

== Schedule ==
Date time, TV	Rank^{#}	Opponent^{#}	Result	Record	High points	High rebounds	High assists	Site (attendance) city, state
Exhibition
October 27, 2024*; 1:00 p.m.		Colorado Mines	W 91–46		–	–	–	CU Events Center; Boulder, CO
Non-conference regular season
November 4, 2024*; 5:30 p.m., MW Network		at Wyoming	W 56–50	1–0	20 – Garzon	11 – Smith	5 – Wetta	Arena-Auditorium (3,866); Laramie, WY
November 7, 2024*; 7:00 p.m., ESPN+		Northern Colorado	W 81–66	2–0	19 – Masogayo	8 – Betson	10 – Wetta	CU Events Center (2,161); Boulder, CO
November 10, 2024*; 2:00 p.m., MW Network		at Boise State	L 47–50	2–1	13 – Masogayo	7 – Smith	4 – Wetta	ExtraMile Arena (1,537); Boise, ID
November 12, 2024*; 8:00 p.m., MW Network		vs. Nevada	W 75–59	3–1	14 – Teder	5 – Wetta	3 – Masogayo	Tahoe Blue Event Center (533); Stateline, NV
November 17, 2024*; 5:00 p.m., ESPN+		Southern	W 65–45	4–1	11 – Teder	6 – Smith	5 – Wetta	CU Events Center (2,393); Boulder, CO
November 19, 2024*; 7:00 p.m., ESPN+		Utah State	W 95–65	5–1	28 – Garzon	6 – Masogayo	9 – Wetta	CU Events Center (2,573); Boulder, CO
November 27, 2024*; 1:00 p.m., ESPN+		at Utah Tech	W 85–73	6–1	21 – Smith	10 – Smith	8 – Wetta	Burns Arena (467); St. George, UT
November 30, 2024*; 1:00 p.m., ESPN+		No. 24 Louisville	L 71–79	6–2	25 – Formann	3 – Tied	10 – Wetta	CU Events Center (3,487); Boulder, CO
December 3, 2024*; 11:00 a.m., ESPN+		Tennessee Tech	W 91–79	7–2	15 – Tied	7 – Grace	8 – Wetta	CU Events Center (2,734); Boulder, CO
December 7, 2024*; 1:00 p.m., ESPN+		Southern Utah	W 76–59	8–2	20 – Garzon	7 – Smith	7 – Teder	CU Events Center (2,280); Boulder, CO
December 10, 2024*; 7:00 p.m., ESPN+		Denver	W 78–61	9–2	14 – Tied	9 – Smith	4 – Teder	CU Events Center (2,036); Boulder, CO
Big 12 regular season
December 21, 2024; 6:00 p.m., ESPN+		No. 14 West Virginia	W 65–60	10–2 (1–0)	22 – Formann	7 – Masogayo	5 – Sanders	CU Events Center (3,209); Boulder, CO
January 1, 2025; 5:30 p.m., ESPN+		No. 11 TCU	L 50–63	10–3 (1–1)	14 – Masogayo	7 – Smith	6 – Wetta	Schollmaier Arena (2,864); Fort Worth, TX
January 4, 2025; 1:00 p.m., ESPN+		at Baylor	L 62–76	10–4 (1–2)	13 – Masogayo	9 – Oliver	2 – Tied	Ferrell Center (3,764); Waco, TX
January 8, 2025; 7:00 p.m., ESPN+		UCF	W 81–62	11–4 (2–2)	22 – Formann	5 – Wetta	6 – Wetta	CU Events Center (2,127); Boulder, CO
January 11, 2025; 1:00 p.m., ESPN+		Kansas	W 84–76	12–4 (3–2)	20 – Masogayo	19 – Smith	8 – Wetta	CU Events Center (4,562); Boulder, CO
January 15, 2025; 5:00 p.m., ESPN+		at No. 20 West Virginia	L 46–73	12–5 (3–3)	11 – Formann	9 – Smith	3 – Tied	WVU Coliseum (3,153); Morgantown, WV
January 18, 2025; 4:00 p.m., ESPN+		Cincinnati	L 59–65	12–6 (3–4)	16 – Masogayo	7 – Masogayo	4 – Wetta	CU Events Center (1,649); Boulder, CO
January 25, 2025; 1:00 p.m., ESPN+		No. 10 Kansas State	W 63–53	13–6 (4–4)	14 – Formann	7 – Masogayo	4 – Wetta	CU Events Center (4,407); Boulder, CO
January 29, 2025; 7:00 p.m., ESPN+		at BYU	W 67–66	14–6 (5–4)	22 – Diew	13 – Smith	3 – Tied	Marriott Center (2,020); Provo, UT
February 2, 2025; 2:00 p.m., ESPNU		Texas Tech	W 67–51	15–6 (5–5)	17 – Garzon	8 – Oliver	6 – Wetta	CU Events Center (4,953); Boulder, CO
February 5, 2025; 7:00 p.m., ESPN+		Arizona	W 56–47	16–6 (7–4)	19 – Masogayo	14 – Masogayo	5 – Wetta	CU Events Center (2,748); Boulder, CO
February 8, 2025; 4:00 p.m., ESPN+		at Iowa State	L 56–86	16–7 (7–5)	15 – Diew	7 – Betson	4 – Sanders	Hilton Coliseum (10,081); Ames, IA
February 12, 2025; 7:00 p.m., ESPN+		at Utah	L 60–77	16–8 (7–6)	15 – Betson	8 – Betson	4 – Tied	Jon M. Huntsman Center (3,756); Salt Lake City, UT
February 15, 2025; 6:00 p.m., ESPN+		Houston	W 83–60	17–8 (8–6)	20 – Johnson	14 – Oliver	5 – Sanders	CU Events Center (4,494); Boulder, CO
February 19, 2025; 7:00 p.m., ESPN+		No. 19 Baylor	L 62–84	17–9 (8–7)	16 – Masogayo	6 – Powell	4 – Sanders	CU Events Center (3,182); Boulder, CO
February 22, 2025; 1:00 p.m., ESPN+		at No. 24 Oklahoma State	L 65–82	17–10 (8–8)	20 – Johnson	6 – Tied	7 – Wetta	Gallagher-Iba Arena (4,367); Stillwater, OK
February 26, 2025; 7:00 p.m., ESPN+		Arizona State	W 89–54	18–10 (9–8)	17 – Garzon	8 – Garzon	6 – Tied	CU Events Center (2,724); Boulder, CO
March 1, 2025; 1:00 p.m., ESPN+		at Texas Tech	L 79–83 ^{OT}	18–11 (9–9)	18 – Masogayo	6 – Tied	6 – Sanders	United Supermarkets Arena (5,452); Lubbock, TX
Big 12 Women's Tournament
March 5, 2025; 12:30 p.m., ESPN+	(9)	vs. (16) Houston; First Round	W 66–58	19–11	21 – Garzon	7 – Oliver	6 – Wetta	T-Mobile Center (4,617); Kansas City, MO
March 6, 2025; 12:30 p.m., ESPN+	(9)	vs. (8) Arizona; Second Round	W 61–58	20–11	16 – Betson	7 – Betson	5 – Wetta	T-Mobile Center (4,265); Kansas City, MO
March 7, 2025; 12:30 p.m., ESPN+	(9)	vs. (1) No. 7 TCU; Quarterfinals	L 62–69	20–12	22 – Masogayo	7 – Betson	4 – Garzon	T-Mobile Center (4,886); Kansas City, MO
WBIT
March 20, 2025*; 7:00 p.m., ESPN+	(1)	Southeastern Louisiana; First round	W 73–41	21–12	18 – Garzon	7 – Wetta	6 – Wetta	CU Events Center (1,469); Boulder, CO
March 23, 2025*; 1:00 p.m., ESPN+	(1)	(4) Gonzaga; Second round	L 55–64	21–13	15 – Garzon	6 – Betson	4 – Wetta	CU Events Center (1,860); Boulder, CO
*Non-conference game. ^{#}Rankings from AP Poll. (#) Tournament seedings in parentheses. All times are in Mountain Time.

== Game summaries ==
=== at Wyoming ===
MW Network

November 4, 2024
5:30 p.m. MST

Colorado Buffaloes 56, Wyoming Cowgirls 50
Scoring by quarter: 10–15, 8–9, 20–10, 18–16
Pts: Lior Garzon, 20; Rebs: Sara-Rose Smith, 11; Asts: Kindyll Wetta, 5	Pts: Allyson Fertig, 18; Rebs: Tess Barnes, 7 Asts: Malene Pedersen, 4

Arena-Auditorium • Laramie, WY
Attendance: 3,866
Referees: Denise Lopez, Joseph Barcellos, Brad Schmidt

=== Northern Colorado ===
ESPN+

November 7, 2024
7:00 p.m. MST

Northern Colorado Bears 66, Colorado Buffaloes 81
Scoring by quarter: 15–25, 19–19, 10–16, 22–21
Pts: Silvia Nativi, 13; Rebs: Tatum West, 8 Asts: Gabi Fields, 6	Pts: Jade Masogayo, 19; Rebs: Tabitha Betson, 8 Asts: Kindyll Wetta, 10

CU Events Center • Boulder, CO
Attendance: 2,161
Referees: Genesis Perrymond, Erica Parker, Kelly Broomfield

=== at Boise State ===
MW Network

November 10, 2024
2:00 p.m. MST

Colorado Buffaloes 47, Boise State Broncos 50
Scoring by quarter: 15–15, 8–6, 15–19, 9–10
Pts: Jade Masogayo, 13; Rebs: Sara-Rose Smith, 7 Asts: Kindyll Wetta, 4	Pts: Teryn Gardner, 10; Rebs: Abby Muse, 8 Asts: Libby Hutton, 2

ExtraMile Arena • Boise, ID
Attendance: 1,537
Referees: Benny Luna, Teresa Turner, Nadi Carey

=== vs Nevada ===
MW Network

November 12, 2024
8:00 p.m. MST

Colorado Buffaloes 75, Nevada Wolf Pack 59
Scoring by quarter: 18–15, 16–11, 24–17, 17–16
Pts: Johanna Teder, 14; Rebs: Kindyll Wetta, 5 Asts: Jade Masogayo, 3	Pts: Lexie Givens, 17; Rebs: Lexie Givens, 8 Asts: Audrey Roden, 2

Tahoe Blue Event Center • Stateline, NV
Attendance: 533
Referees: Lorena Ahumada, Charlie Stein, Bob Schfield

=== Southern ===
ESPN+

November 17, 2024
5:00 p.m. MST

Southern Lady Jaguars 45, Colorado Buffaloes 65
Scoring by quarter: 11–16, 6–15, 21–18, 7–16
Pts: Aniya Gourdine, 12; Rebs: Aniya Gourdine, 6 Asts: Taniya Lawson, 2	Pts: Johanna Teder, 11; Rebs: Sara-Rose Smith, 6 Asts: Kindyll Wetta, 5

CU Events Center • Boulder, CO
Attendance: 2,393
Referees: Erica Parker, Zac Brost, Kyle Bacon

=== Utah State ===
ESPN+

November 19, 2024
7:00 p.m. MST

Utah State Aggies 65, Colorado Buffaloes 95
Scoring by quarter: 13–21, 26–25, 3–27, 23–22
Pts: Cheyenne Stubbs, 19; Rebs: Jamisyn Heaton, 5 Asts: Cheyenne Stubbs, 3	Pts: Lior Garzon, 28; Rebs: Jade Masogayo, 6 Asts: Kindyll Wetta, 9

CU Events Center • Boulder, CO
Attendance: 2,573
Referees: Genesis Perrymond, Kelly Broomield, Eric Brewton

=== at Utah Tech ===
ESPN+

November 27, 2024
1:00 p.m. MST

Colorado Buffaloes 85, Utah Tech Trailblazers 73
Scoring by quarter: 30–21, 17–18, 16–18, 22–16
Pts: Sara-Rose Smith, 21; Rebs: Sara-Rose Smith, 10; Asts: Kindyll Wetta, 8	Pts: Aaliyah Ibarra, 15; Rebs: Chardonnay Hartley, 6 Asts: Chardonnay Hartley, 10

Burns Arena • St. George, UT
Attendance: 467
Referees: Lisa Bishop, Teresa Turner, Michael Price

=== No. 24 Louisville ===
ESPN+

November 30, 2024
1:00 p.m. MST

No. 24 Louisville Cardinals 79, Colorado Buffaloes 71
Scoring by quarter: 10–16, 25–17, 21–22, 23–16
Pts: Nyla Harris, 14; Rebs: Nyla Harris, 4 Asts: Jayda Curry, 3	Pts: Frida Formann, 25; Rebs: Jade Masogayo, 3 Asts: Kindyll Wetta, 10

CU Events Center • Boulder, CO
Attendance: 3,487
Referees: In'Fini Robinson, Chuck Gonzalez, Roy Gulbeyan

=== Tennessee Tech ===
ESPN+

December 3, 2024
11:00 a.m. MST

Tennessee Tech Golden Eagles 79, Colorado Buffaloes 91
Scoring by quarter: 25–21, 14–31, 23–23, 17–16
Pts: Reghan Grimes, 26; Rebs: Keeley Carter, 5 Asts: Keeley Carter, 6	Pts: Ayianna Johnson, 15; Rebs: Grace Oliver, 7 Asts: Kindyll Wetta, 8

CU Events Center • Boulder, CO
Attendance: 2,734
Referees: Nicole Brannon, Zac Brost, Brian Hall

=== Southern Utah ===
ESPN+

December 7, 2024
1:00 p.m. MST

Southern Utah Thunderbirds 59, Colorado Buffaloes 76
Scoring by quarter: 18–22, 13–25, 10–12, 18–17
Pts: Sydney Gandy, 11; Rebs: Jaeden Brown, 5 Asts: Sierra Chambers, 3	Pts: Lior Garzon, 20; Rebs: Sara-Rose Smith, 7 Asts: Johanna Teder, 7

CU Events Center • Boulder, CO
Attendance: 2,280
Referees: Erica Parker, Kelly Broomfield, Brenda Pantoja

=== Denver ===
ESPN+

December 10, 2024
7:00 p.m. MST

Denver Pioneers 61, Colorado Buffaloes 78
Scoring by quarter: 17–21, 8–19, 16–18, 20–20
Pts: Jordan Jones, 15; Rebs: Emma Smith, 6 Asts: Jordan Jones, 5	Pts: Ayianna Johnson, 14; Rebs: Sara-Rose Smith, 9 Asts: Johanna Teder, 4

CU Events Center • Boulder, CO
Attendance: 2,036
Referees: Genesis Perrymound, Brian Garland, Dee Kanter
