= Colorado Buffaloes women's basketball =

Colorado Buffaloes
2026–27 Colorado Buffaloes women's basketball team
- University: University of Colorado Boulder
- First season: 1975; 51 years ago
- Head coach: JR Payne (11th season)
- Location: Boulder, Colorado
- Arena: CU Events Center (capacity: 11,064)
- Conference: Big 12
- Nickname: Buffaloes
- Colors: Silver, black, and gold

NCAA Division I tournament Elite Eight
- 1993, 1995, 2002
Other NCAA Division I tournament results
Sweet Sixteen	1993, 1994, 1995, 1997, 2002, 2003, 2023, 2024
Appearances	1988, 1989, 1992, 1993, 1994, 1995, 1996, 1997, 2001, 2002, 2003, 2004, 2013, 2022, 2023, 2024, 2026

AIAW tournament appearances
- 1981, 1982

Conference tournament champions
- 1989, 1992, 1995, 1996, 1997

Conference regular-season champions
- 1989, 1995

Uniforms
Home	Away

The Colorado Buffaloes women's basketball team represents the University of Colorado Boulder and competes in the Big 12 Conference of NCAA Division I.

== Conferences ==
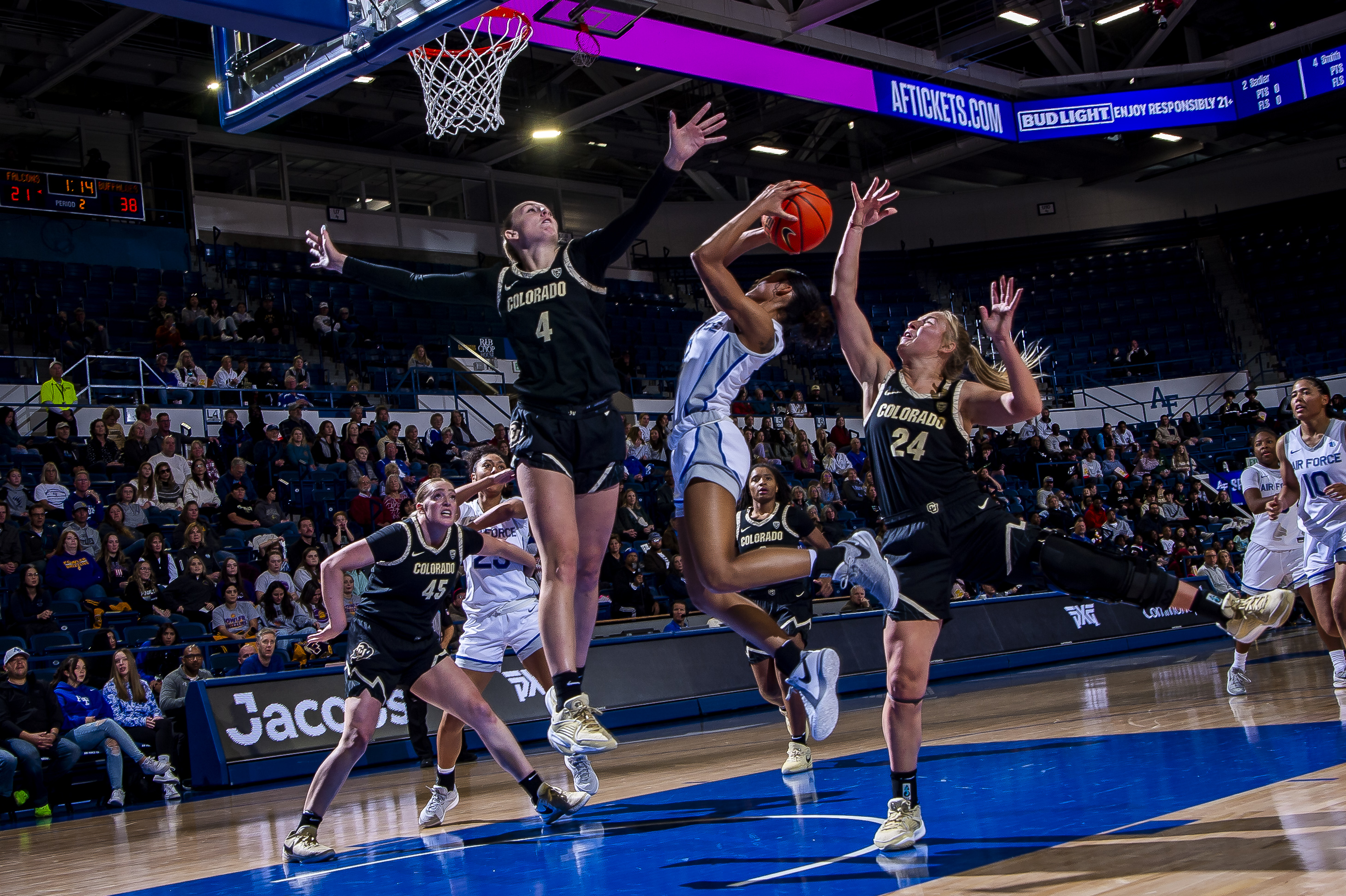
Colorado players defend a shot by an Air Force Falcons women's basketball opponent during a 2023 game at Clune Arena

Colorado plays in the Big 12 Conference. The Buffaloes were a member of the Big 12 from 1997 to 2011, following the formation of the conference through the merger of the Big Eight Conference and several members of the Southwest Conference. Colorado then competed in the Pac-12 Conference from 2011 to 2024 before rejoining the Big 12 in 2024.

== Coaches ==
Colorado's head women's basketball coach is JR Payne. Payne was hired prior to the 2016–17 season. She replaced Linda Lappe, who was fired at the end of the 2015–16 season with a 7–23 record.

On March 28, 2016, JR Payne became head coach at Colorado. The eighth head coach in program history, Payne replaced Linda Lappe, who was fired after managing only a career 33–57 (.367) record in Pac-12 play. JR Payne inherited a program that finished 7–23 (2–16 Pac-12) in Lappe's final season. JR Payne's 2018–19 Colorado team began Pac-12 conference play with 11 straight losses, the worst start to conference play in program history. JR Payne's 2018–19 Buffs lost on the road to #4 ranked Oregon 102–43, the 59-point loss was the worst loss in 35 years, and the 4th worst in program history. The Buffs home win against USC on February 10, 2019 allowed CU to prevent from having both the first 12 game losing streak in program history, and the first winless conference season in program history.

== Roster ==
2026–27 Colorado Buffaloes women's basketball team
Players
Coaches

Pos.	#	Name	Height	Year	Previous school	Hometown
G	0	Brooke Walker	5 ft 8 in (1.73 m)	Jr	Andover High School; Utah	Andover, KS
G	1	Zyanna Walker	5 ft 11 in (1.8 m)	Sr	Wichita Heights HS; Kansas State	Wichita, KS
G	2	Kennedy Sanders	5 ft 8 in (1.73 m)	RS Jr	Chaska HS	Chaska, MN
G	3	Cail Jahnke	6 ft 2 in (1.88 m)	Fr	St. Michael-Albertville High School	Minneapolis, MN
G	5	Lauren Harris	5 ft 11 in (1.8 m)	Fr	Faith Christian High School	Yuba City, CA
G	6	Mecailin Marshall	5 ft 10 in (1.78 m)	So	Abernathy High School; Tulane	Lubbock, TX
G	7	Claire O'Connor	6 ft 0 in (1.83 m)	Sr	Lakeside School; Gonzaga	Bellevue, WA
C	8	Jade Crook	6 ft 4 in (1.93 m)	So	Australia Centre of Excellence; Lake Ginninderra College	Albury, Australia
F	11	Logyn Greer	6 ft 4 in (1.93 m)	So	Friends' Central School	Lansdowne, PA
G	13	Maeve McErlane	5 ft 10 in (1.78 m)	Sr	Notre Dame; DePaul	Philadelphia, PA
C	20	Anete Adler	6 ft 5 in (1.96 m)	GS	Audentes Sports Gymnasium; Boston University	Keila, Estonia
F	21	Kira Reynolds	6 ft 2 in (1.88 m)	So	Washington High School; UT Arlington	South Bend, IN
F	22	Sophie Zadel	6 ft 4 in (1.93 m)	So	Alamo Heights HS	San Antonio, TX
G	23	Aniya' Foy	5 ft 11 in (1.8 m)	So	Cinco Ranch High School; Kansas State	Katy, TX

Head coach

- JR Payne (Saint Mary's)

Assistant coach(es)

- Toriano Towns (Saint Mary's)
- Taelor Karr (Gonzaga)
- Matt Hower (Colorado State)
- Jordynn Hernandez (UT Arlington)
- Shelley Sheetz (Colorado)

Legend

- (C) Team captain
- (S) Suspended
- (I) Ineligible
- (W) Walk-on
- Injured
- Current redshirt

Roster
Last update: June 26, 2026

== Year by year results ==
Conference tournament winners noted with (W)

Season	Team	Overall	Conference	Standing	Postseason	Coaches' poll	AP poll
Carol Hochsprung (Intermountain) (1975–1976)
1975	Carol Hochsprung	2–11	2–10				
Carol Hochsprung:		2–11 (.154)	2–10 (.167)				
Jerry Zancanelli (Intermountain) (1975–1978)
1975–76	Jerry Zancanelli	8–12	5–8				
1976–77	Jerry Zancanelli	14–12	5–8				
1977–78	Jerry Zancanelli	18–14	5–8				
Jerry Zancanelli:		40–38 (.513)	15–24 (.385)				
Rene Portland (Intermountain) (1978–1980)
1978–79	Rene Portland	22–9	10–3		AIAW Regional		
1979–80	Rene Portland	18–11	9–1		AIAW Regional		
Rene Portland:		40–20 (.667)	19–4 (.826)				
Sox Walseth (Intermountain) (1980–1982)
1980–81	Sox Walseth	28–5	10–0		AIAW First Round		
1981–82	Sox Walseth	28–8	8–2		AIAW First Round		
Sox Walseth (Big Eight Conference) (1982–1983)
1982–83	Sox Walseth	21–8	7–5				
Sox Walseth:		77–21 (.786)	25–7 (.781)				
Ceal Barry (Big Eight Conference) (1983–1996)
1983–84	Ceal Barry	10–18	3–11				
1984–85	Ceal Barry	6–22	2–12				
1985–86	Ceal Barry	21–9	9–5	2nd			
1986–87	Ceal Barry	14–14	6–8				
1987–88	Ceal Barry	21–11	8–6		NCAA Second Round (Play-In)		
1988–89	Ceal Barry	27–4	14–0	1st (W)	NCAA Second Round (Bye)	19	9
1989–90	Ceal Barry	17–11	10–4				
1990–91	Ceal Barry	18–11	8–6				
1991–92	Ceal Barry	22–9	11–3	2nd (W)	NCAA First Round		
1992–93	Ceal Barry	27–4	12–2	1st	NCAA Elite Eight	9	10
1993–94	Ceal Barry	27–5	12–2	1st	NCAA Sweet Sixteen	10	5
1994–95	Ceal Barry	30–3	14–0	1st (W)	NCAA Elite Eight	5	2
1995–96	Ceal Barry	26–9	9–5	(W)	NCAA Second Round	18	17
Ceal Barry (Big 12 Conference) (1996–2005)
1996–97	Ceal Barry	23–9	12–4	T–2nd (W) (Big 12)	NCAA Sweet Sixteen	15	18
1997–98	Ceal Barry	12–16	5–11	8th			
1998–99	Ceal Barry	15–14	7–9	T–8th	WNIT Sixteen		
1999–2000	Ceal Barry	10–19	4–12	10th			
2000–01	Ceal Barry	22–9	11–5	4th	NCAA Second Round	23	20
2001–02	Ceal Barry	24–10	11–5	T–3rd	NCAA Elite Eight	9	12
2002–03	Ceal Barry	24–8	11–5	4th	NCAA Sweet Sixteen	19	
2003–04	Ceal Barry	22–8	11–5	3rd	NCAA First Round	24	17
2004–05	Ceal Barry	9–19	2–14	T–11th			
Ceal Barry:		427–242 (.638)	192–134 (.589)				
Kathy McConnell-Miller (Big 12 Conference) (2005–2010)
2005–06	Kathy McConnell-Miller	9–21	3–13	11th			
2006–07	Kathy McConnell-Miller	13–17	6–10	T–7th			
2007–08	Kathy McConnell-Miller	19–15	5–11	9th	WNIT Semifinals		
2008–09	Kathy McConnell-Miller	11–18	3–13	12th			
2009–10	Kathy McConnell-Miller	13–17	3–13	11th			
Kathy McConnell-Miller:		65–88 (.425)	20–60 (.250)				
Linda Lappe (Big 12 Conference) (2010–2016)
2010–11	Linda Lappe	18–16	6–10	T–8th (Big 12)	WNIT Quarterfinals		
Linda Lappe (Pac-12 Conference) (2011–2016)
2011–12	Linda Lappe	21–14	6–12	10th (Pac-12)	WNIT Quarterfinals		
2012–13	Linda Lappe	25–7	13–5	4th	NCAA First Round	19	19
2013–14	Linda Lappe	19–15	6–12	T–9th	WNIT Quarterfinals		
2014–15	Linda Lappe	15–17	6–12	T–9th			
2015–16	Linda Lappe	7–23	2–16	12th			
Linda Lappe:		105–92 (.533)	39–67 (.368)				
JR Payne (Pac-12 Conference) (2016–2024)
2016–17	JR Payne	17–16	5–13	T–9th	WNIT Third round		
2017–18	JR Payne	15–16	5–13	9th			
2018–19	JR Payne	12–18	2–16	12th			
2019–20	JR Payne	16–14	5–13	T–9th			
2020–21	JR Payne	12–11	8–8	6th	WNIT Quarterfinals		
2021–22	JR Payne	22–9	9–7	5th			
2022–23	JR Payne	25–9	13–5	3rd	NCAA Sweet Sixteen	15	21
2023–24	JR Payne	24–10	11–7	T–5th	NCAA Sweet Sixteen	16	15
JR Payne (Big 12 Conference) (2024–present)
2024–25	JR Payne	21–13	9–9	9th	WBIT Second round		
2025–26	JR Payne	22–12	11–7	6th	NCAA First Round		
JR Payne:		184–126 (.594)	78–98 (.443)				
Total:		940–638 (.596)					
National champion Postseason invitational champion Conference regular season champion Conference regular season and conference tournament champion Division regular season champion Division regular season and conference tournament champion Conference tournament champion

== NCAA tournament results ==
The Buffaloes have appeared in 17 NCAA Tournaments, with a record of 21–17.

Year	Seed	Round	Opponent	Result
1988	#7	First Round; Second Round	#10 Eastern Illinois #2 Long Beach State	W 78−72; L 64–103
1989	#3	Second Round	#6 UNLV	L 74–84
1992	#7	First Round	#10 Southern Illinois	L 80–84 (OT)
1993	#4	Second Round; Sweet Sixteen; Elite Eight	#5 UC Santa Barbara #1 Stanford #2 Texas Tech	W 81−54; W 80–67; L 54–79
1994	#3	First Round; Second Round; Sweet Sixteen	#14 Marquette #6 Oregon #2 Stanford	W 77−74; W 92–71; L 62–78
1995	#1	First Round; Second Round; Sweet Sixteen; Elite Eight	#16 Holy Cross #9 SW Missouri State #4 George Washington #3 Georgia	W 83−49; W 78–34; W 77–61; L 79–82
1996	#3	First Round; Second Round	#14 Tulane #6 Auburn	W 83−75; L 61–66
1997	#2	First Round; Second Round; Sweet Sixteen	#15 Marshall #7 Stephen F. Austin #3 Tennessee	W 69−49; W 75–74; L 67–75
2001	#6	First Round; Second Round	#11 Siena #3 Vanderbilt	W 98−78; L 59–65
2002	#3	First Round; Second Round; Sweet Sixteen; Elite Eight	#14 Southern #6 LSU #2 Stanford #1 Oklahoma	W 88−61; W 69–58; W 62–59; L 60–94
2003	#6	First Round; Second Round; Sweet Sixteen	#11 BYU #3 North Carolina #2 Villanova	W 84−45; W 86–67; L 51–53
2004	#6	First Round	#11 UC Santa Barbara	L 49–76
2013	#5	First Round	#12 Kansas	L 52–67
2022	#7	First Round	#10 Creighton	L 74-84
2023	#6	First Round; Second Round; Sweet Sixteen	#11 Middle Tennessee #3 Duke #2 Iowa	W 82–60; W 61–53 (OT); L 77–87
2024	#5	First Round; Second Round; Sweet Sixteen	#12 Drake #4 Kansas State #1 Iowa	W 86–72; W 63–50; L 68–89
2026	#10	First Round	#7 Illinois	L 57–66
