= 2025–26 Texas Tech Lady Raiders basketball team =

Intercollegiate basketball season team

2025–26 Texas Tech Lady Raiders basketball

NCAA tournament, Second Round
- Conference: Big 12 Conference

Ranking
- Coaches: No. 23
- Record: 26–8 (12–6 Big 12)
- Head coach: Krista Gerlich (6th season)
- Associate head coach: Adrian Walters
- Assistant coaches: Erik DeRoo; Jaida Williams; Ketara Chapel; Renae Boone
- Home arena: United Supermarkets Arena

2025–26 Big 12 women's basketball standings
| | Conf. | | | | Overall |
| Team | W | | L | PCT | W | | L | PCT |
|---|---|---|---|---|---|---|---|---|
| No. 6 TCU | 15 | – | 3 | .833 | 32 | – | 6 | .842 |
| No. 18 West Virginia † | 14 | – | 4 | .778 | 28 | – | 7 | .800 |
| No. 23 Baylor | 13 | – | 5 | .722 | 25 | – | 9 | .735 |
| Oklahoma State | 12 | – | 6 | .667 | 24 | – | 10 | .706 |
| Texas Tech | 12 | – | 6 | .667 | 26 | – | 8 | .765 |
| Colorado | 11 | – | 7 | .611 | 22 | – | 12 | .647 |
| Iowa State | 10 | – | 8 | .556 | 22 | – | 10 | .688 |
| Utah | 10 | – | 8 | .556 | 19 | – | 13 | .594 |
| BYU | 9 | – | 9 | .500 | 26 | – | 12 | .684 |
| Arizona State | 9 | – | 9 | .500 | 24 | – | 11 | .686 |
| Kansas | 8 | – | 10 | .444 | 22 | – | 14 | .611 |
| Kansas State | 8 | – | 10 | .444 | 19 | – | 18 | .514 |
| Cincinnati | 6 | – | 12 | .333 | 11 | – | 20 | .355 |
| UCF | 3 | – | 15 | .167 | 11 | – | 19 | .367 |
| Arizona | 3 | – | 15 | .167 | 12 | – | 18 | .400 |
| Houston | 1 | – | 17 | .056 | 7 | – | 23 | .233 |
† 2026 Big 12 tournament winner Rankings from AP poll

The 2025–26 Texas Tech Lady Raiders basketball team currently represents Texas Tech University for the 2025–26 NCAA Division I women's basketball season. The Lady Raiders, led by sixth-year head coach Krista Gerlich, played their home games at the United Supermarkets Arena as members of the Big 12 Conference.

Texas Tech began the season unranked and were picked 13th out of 16 teams in the Big 12 Conference's preseason media poll. Instead, the Lady Raiders had their best season in over 21 years. They started out 19–0, including a win over #15 Baylor, and entered the rankings for the first time since the 2011–12 season; this was their best start to a season in program history. Texas Tech finished the regular season 25–6 overall and 12–6 in Big 12 play; their 12 conference wins were the most since 2005. Seniors Bailey Maupin and Snudda Collins were named to the All-Big 12 First Team and Second Team respectively, and Collins was also named the Big 12 Sixth Player of the Year. For her efforts in revitalizing the Lady Raider basketball program, Gerlich was voted Big 12 Coach of the Year at the conclusion of the regular season. In the NCAA tournament, Texas Tech was selected as a 7-seed in the Sacramento #2 regional. They defeated 10-seed Villanova in the First Round, which was their first NCAA tournament win since 2005.

== Previous season ==
The Lady Raiders finished the 2024–25 season 19–18, 4–14 in Big 12 play to finish in a three-way tie for twelfth place. As No. 14 seed in the Big 12 tournament they defeated Kansas and Utah in the first and second rounds before losing in the quarterfinals to Oklahoma State. They received an at-large bid to the WBIT in the Virginia Tech bracket. They defeated Wyoming and Alabama in the first and second rounds and Texas Tech in the quarterfinals before losing to Minnesota in the semifinals.

== Offseason ==
=== Departures ===
Texas Tech departures
| Name | Number | Pos. | Height | Year | Hometown | Reason for departure |
|---|---|---|---|---|---|---|
| Kilah Freelon | 2 | G/F | 6'1" | Junior | Denver, CO | Transferred to Virginia Tech |
| Jasmine Shavers | 3 | G | 5'8" | (redshirt) Junior | Mesquite, TX | Transferred to Florida State |
| Achol Magot | 10 | C | 6'7" | Sophomore | Tucson, AZ | Transferred to Arizona State |
| Jordyn Merritt | 12 | G/F | 6'3" | Graduate student | Plano, TX | Graduated |
| Ivana Krajina | 13 | G | 5'11" | Junior | Kaštel Novi, Croatia | Transferred to LMU |
| Loghan Johnson | 23 | G | 5'10" | Sophomore | Houston, TX | Transferred to West Virginia |
| Jada Wynn | 24 | G | 6'1" | Junior | Yorba Linda, CA | Transferred to UC Irvine |
| Kelly Mora | 30 | G | 6'1" | Sophomore | Lubbock, TX | Transferred |
| Maya Peat | 54 | C | 6'6" | Graduate student | Lubbock, TX | Graduated |

=== Incoming ===
Texas Tech incoming transfers
| Name | Num | Pos. | Height | Year | Hometown | Previous school |
|---|---|---|---|---|---|---|
| Snudda Collins | 0 | F | 6'1" | Graduate student | Brookhaven, MS | Ole Miss |
| Gemma Núñez | 2 | G | 5'7" | Senior | Almería, Spain | Campbell |
| Julie Nekolná | 3 | F | 6'3" | Junior | Prague, Czech Republic | Shelton State Community College |
| Sidney Love | 10 | G | 5'8" | Senior | Cibolo, TX | UTSA |
| Mariam Sanogo | 17 | F | 6'2" | Senior | Paris, France | Canisius |
| Jada Malone | 23 | F | 6'3" | (redshirt) Senior | Spring, TX | Texas A&M |

==== Recruiting ====
There was no recruiting class of 2025.

==== Recruiting class of 2026 ====
College recruiting (2026)
| Name | Hometown | School | Height | Weight | Commit date |
|---|---|---|---|---|---|
| Gianna Jordan; PG | Southlake, TX | Kingdom Collegiate Academy | 5 ft 7 in (1.70 m) | N/A | |
| Gianna Jordan; PG | Recruit ratings: ESPN: (93) | | | | |
| Ambrosia Cole; PG | Lubbock, TX | Monterey High School | 5 ft 6 in (1.68 m) | N/A | |
| Ambrosia Cole; PG | Recruit ratings: ESPN: (91) | | | | |
Overall recruit ranking:
Note: In many cases, Scout, Rivals, 247Sports, On3, and ESPN may conflict in their listings of height and weight.; In these cases, the average was taken. ESPN grades are on a 100-point scale.; Sources: "2026 Player Commits". ESPN. Archived from the original on November 1, 2024.

== Roster ==
2025–26 Texas Tech Lady Raiders women's basketball team
Players
Coaches

| Pos. | # | Name | Height | Year | Previous school | Hometown |
|---|---|---|---|---|---|---|
| F | 0 | Snudda Collins | 6 ft 1 in (1.85 m) | GS | Brookhaven HS; Ole Miss | Brookhaven, MS |
| G/F | 1 | Jalynn Bristow | 6 ft 2 in (1.88 m) | Jr | Holliday HS; Iowa State | Holliday, TX |
| G | 2 | Gemma Núñez | 5 ft 7 in (1.7 m) | Sr | I.E.S. Bahia de Almería; Campbell | Almería, Spain |
| F | 3 | Julie Nekolná | 6 ft 3 in (1.91 m) | Jr | Holtville; Shelton State CC | Prague, Czech Republic |
| G | 5 | Denae Fritz | 5 ft 11 in (1.8 m) | RS Sr | Maryville HS; Baylor | Maryville, TN |
| G | 7 | Bird Martin | 6 ft 2 in (1.88 m) | So | Providence Catholic School | San Antonio, TX |
| G | 8 | Adlee Blacklock | 6 ft 0 in (1.83 m) | Sr | Lubbock-Cooper HS; Oregon State | Lubbock, TX |
| G | 10 | Sidney Love | 5 ft 8 in (1.73 m) | Sr | Steele HS; UTSA | Cibolo, TX |
| F/C | 11 | Sarengbe Sanogo | 6 ft 3 in (1.91 m) | Sr | Odessa College | Paris, France |
| G/F | 17 | Mariam Sanogo | 6 ft 2 in (1.88 m) | Sr | Canisius | Paris, France |
| G | 20 | Bailey Maupin | 5 ft 10 in (1.78 m) | Sr | Gruver HS | Gruver, TX |
| F | 23 | Jada Malone | 6 ft 3 in (1.91 m) | RS Sr | The Village School; Texas A&M | Spring, TX |
| F | 24 | Stephanie Okechukwu | 7 ft 1 in (2.16 m) | Fr | Fukuchiyama Seibi | Umunneochi, Nigeria |

Head coach

- Krista Gerlich (Texas Tech)

Assistant coach(es)

- Adrian Walters (Saint Francis (PA))
- Erik Deroo (Fresno State)
- Jaida Williams (Cal Poly Pomona)
- Ketara Chapel (Mississippi State)
- Renae Boone (Central Missouri)

Legend

- (C) Team captain
- (S) Suspended
- (I) Ineligible
- (W) Walk-on
- Injured
- Current redshirt

Roster

== Schedule and results ==
| Date time, TV | Rank^{#} | Opponent^{#} | Result | Record | High points | High rebounds | High assists | Site (attendance) city, state |
Non-conference regular season
| November 3, 2025*; 6:00 p.m., ESPN+ | | North Carolina A&T | W 78–40 | 1–0 | 19 – Bristow | 9 – Bristow | 7 – Maupin | United Supermarkets Arena (2,978); Lubbock, TX |
| November 6, 2025*; 6:00 p.m., ESPN+ | | UTSA | W 79–52 | 2–0 | 19 – Maupin | 7 – tied | 7 – Núñez | United Supermarkets Arena (3,315); Lubbock, TX |
| November 9, 2025*; 2:00 p.m., ESPN+ | | Texas State | W 83–50 | 3–0 | 22 – Bristow | 6 – tied | 10 – Núñez | United Supermarkets Arena (3,118); Lubbock, TX |
| November 13, 2025*; 6:00 p.m., ESPN+ | | SMU | W 91–60 | 4–0 | 26 – Maupin | 10 – Bristow | 6 – Núñez | United Supermarkets Arena (3,425); Lubbock, TX |
| November 16, 2025*; 2:00 p.m., ESPN+ | | Arkansas | W 80–68 | 5–0 | 19 – Maupin | 7 – tied | 3 – Bristow | United Supermarkets Arena (4,559); Lubbock, TX |
| November 20, 2025*; 6:00 p.m., ESPN+ | | Mississippi State | W 69–62 | 6–0 | 18 – Bristow | 9 – Maupin | 4 – Núñez | United Supermarkets Arena (3,652); Lubbock, TX |
| November 23, 2025*; 2:00 p.m., MW Network | | at New Mexico | W 82–57 | 7–0 | 16 – tied | 7 – Bristow | 8 – Núñez | The Pit (4,623); Albuquerque, NM |
| November 25, 2025*; 4:30 p.m., FloSports | | vs. Old Dominion; Hoopfest Women's Basketball Challenge | W 67–42 | 8–0 | 18 – Bristow | 10 – Bristow | 5 – Núñez | Comerica Center (486); Frisco, TX |
| November 27, 2025*; 2:00 p.m., FloSports | | vs. North Texas; Hoopfest Women's Basketball Challenge | W 67–47 | 9–0 | 22 – Maupin | 8 – Núñez | 6 – Núñez | Comerica Center; Frisco, TX |
| December 3, 2025*; 6:00 p.m., ESPN+ | | Wichita State | W 83–43 | 10–0 | 19 – Malone | 10 – tied | 3 – tied | United Supermarkets Arena (3,339); Lubbock, TX |
| December 12, 2025*; 8:00 p.m., ESPN+ | | at Washington State | W 82–51 | 11–0 | 19 – tied | 7 – Bristow | 7 – Maupin | Beasley Coliseum (862); Pullman, WA |
| December 14, 2025*; 2:00 p.m., ESPN+ | | vs. Abilene Christian | W 67–57 | 12–0 | 14 – tied | 9 – Bristow | 7 – Collins | OC Sports Center Main Gym (1,300); Odessa, TX |
| December 17, 2025*; 11:30 a.m., ESPN+ | | Jacksonville | W 76–40 | 13–0 | 14 – tied | 6 – S. Sanogo | 7 – Maupin | United Supermarkets Arena (15,098); Lubbock, TX |
Big 12 Conference regular season
| December 21, 2025; 3:00 p.m., ESPN+ | | at No. 15 Baylor | W 61–60 | 14–0 (1–0) | 21 – Collins | 7 – Bristow | 6 – Núñez | Foster Pavilion (3,935); Waco, TX |
| December 31, 2025; 6:00 p.m., ESPN+ | No. 21 | UCF | W 73–55 | 15–0 (2–0) | 21 – Bristow | 5 – tied | 8 – Núñez | United Supermarkets Arena (5,226); Lubbock, TX |
| January 3, 2026; 6:00 p.m., ESPN+ | No. 21 | Arizona | W 80–49 | 16–0 (3–0) | 16 – Fritz | 8 – Núñez | 8 – Núñez | United Supermarkets Arena (6,053); Lubbock, TX |
| January 7, 2026; 6:00 p.m., ESPN+ | No. 17 | at West Virginia | W 71–66 | 17–0 (4–0) | 27 – Maupin | 9 – Bristow | 3 – tied | WVU Coliseum (3,196); Morgantown, WV |
| January 10, 2026; 1:00 p.m., ESPN+ | No. 17 | at Cincinnati | W 71–60 | 18–0 (5–0) | 17 – tied | 6 – Bristow | 7 – Núñez | Fifth Third Arena (2,086); Cincinnati, OH |
| January 13, 2026; 6:00 p.m., ESPN+ | No. 17 | Houston | W 71–59 | 19–0 (6–0) | 19 – Maupin | 7 – Bristow | 4 – Maupin | United Supermarkets Arena (5,003); Lubbock, TX |
| January 17, 2026; 1:00 p.m., ESPN+ | No. 17 | Kansas State | L 59–65 | 19–1 (6–1) | 18 – Maupin | 4 – Fritz | 5 – Núñez | United Supermarkets Arena (9,261); Lubbock, TX |
| January 21, 2026; 8:00 p.m., ESPN+ | No. 19 | at BYU | L 61–73 | 19–2 (6–2) | 17 – Collins | 11 – Bristow | 5 – Núñez | Marriott Center (1,788); Provo, UT |
| January 24, 2026; 6:00 p.m., ESPN+ | No. 19 | at Utah | W 77–49 | 20–2 (7–2) | 28 – Collins | 9 – Núñez | 5 – Núñez | Jon M. Huntsman Center (3,440); Salt Lake City, UT |
| January 28, 2026; 6:00 p.m., ESPN+ | No. 21 | Iowa State | L 70–84 | 20–3 (7–3) | 17 – Love | 5 – Tied | 4 – Love | United Supermarkets Arena (5,216); Lubbock, TX |
| February 1, 2026; 1:00 p.m., FS1 | No. 21 | No. 12 TCU | W 62–60 | 21–3 (8–3) | 28 – Collins | 9 – Malone | 3 – Tied | United Supermarkets Arena (6,206); Lubbock, TX |
| February 7, 2026; 5:00 p.m., ESPN+ | No. 18 | at Houston | W 85–61 | 22–3 (9–3) | 25 – Maupin | 6 – Maupin | 7 – Núñez | Fertitta Center (1,910); Houston, TX |
| February 10, 2026; 6:00 p.m., ESPN+ | No. 16 | Kansas | W 70–65 | 23–3 (10–3) | 23 – Maupin | 6 – Fritz | 4 – Love | United Supermarkets Arena (3,893); Lubbock, TX |
| February 14, 2026; 2:30 p.m., ESPN+ | No. 16 | at Oklahoma State | L 65–75 | 23–4 (10–4) | 19 – Maupin | 5 – Collins | 5 – Núñez | Gallagher-Iba Arena (7,098); Stillwater, OK |
| February 18, 2026; 6:00 p.m., ESPN+ | No. 20 | No. 15 Baylor | W 87–56 | 24–4 (11–4) | 23 – Collins | 7 – S. Sanogo | 6 – Love | United Supermarkets Arena (5,020); Lubbock, TX |
| February 21, 2026; 8:00 p.m., ESPN+ | No. 20 | at Colorado | L 68–75 | 24–5 (11–5) | 18 – Bristow | 3 – Tied | 5 – Núñez | CU Events Center (4,852); Boulder, CO |
| February 25, 2026; 6:30 p.m., ESPN+ | No. 20 | at Kansas | L 59–68 | 24–6 (11–6) | 16 – S. Sanogo | 6 – Tied | 6 – Núñez | Allen Fieldhouse (3,566); Lawrence, KS |
| March 1, 2026; 2:00 p.m., ESPN+ | No. 20 | Arizona State | W 58–51 | 25–6 (12–6) | 18 – Bristow | 8 – Núñez | 4 – Núñez | United Supermarkets Arena (5,508); Lubbock, TX |
Big 12 Conference Tournament
| March 5, 2026; 11:00 a.m., ESPN+ | (5) No. 21 | vs. (12) Kansas State; Second Round | L 51–58 | 25–7 | 14 – Collins | 7 – Sanogo | 2 – Tied | T-Mobile Center (4,603); Kansas City, MO |
NCAA Tournament
| March 20, 2026*; 7:30 p.m., ESPNU | (7 S2) No. 25 | vs. (10 S2) Villanova; First Round | W 57–52 | 26–7 | 17 – Maupin | 4 – Tied | 2 – Tied | Pete Maravich Assembly Center; Baton Rouge, LA |
| March 22, 2026*; 2:00 p.m., ABC | (7 S2) No. 25 | at (2 S2) No. 5 LSU; Second Round | L 47–101 | 26–8 | 19 – Maupin | 9 – Fritz | 3 – Tied | Pete Maravich Assembly Center (11,095); Baton Rouge, LA |
*Non-conference game. ^{#}Rankings from AP Poll. (#) Tournament seedings in parentheses. S2=Sacramento 2. All times are in Central Time.

== Rankings ==
Ranking movements Legend: ██ Increase in ranking ██ Decrease in ranking — = Not ranked RV = Received votes
| | Week | | | | | | | | | | | | | | | | | | | | |
| Poll | Pre | 1 | 2 | 3 | 4 | 5 | 6 | 7 | 8 | 9 | 10 | 11 | 12 | 13 | 14 | 15 | 16 | 17 | 18 | 19 | Final |
|---|---|---|---|---|---|---|---|---|---|---|---|---|---|---|---|---|---|---|---|---|---|
| AP | — | — | — | RV | RV | RV | RV | 21 | 21* | 17 | 17 | 19 | 21 | 18 | 16 | 20 | 20 | 21 | 25 | 25 | RV |
| Coaches | — | — | — | RV | RV | RV | RV | 23 | 23 | 20 | 18 | 19 | 20 | 18 | 18 | 20 | 21 | 21 | 22 | 22 | 23 |

*AP did not release a week 8 poll.

== See also ==
- 2025–26 Texas Tech Red Raiders basketball team
