= 2025–26 Kansas State Wildcats women's basketball team =

Collegiate basketball team season

2025–26 Kansas State Wildcats women's basketball

WBIT, Second Round
- Conference: Big 12 Conference
- Record: 19–18 (8–10 Big 12)
- Head coach: Jeff Mittie (12th season)
- Associate head coach: Ebony Gilliam
- Assistant coaches: Ebony Haliburton; Staci Gregorio Foss
- Home arena: Bramlage Coliseum

2025–26 Big 12 women's basketball standings
	Conf.				Overall
Team	W		L	PCT	W		L	PCT
No. 6 TCU	15	–	3	.833	32	–	6	.842
No. 18 West Virginia †	14	–	4	.778	28	–	7	.800
No. 23 Baylor	13	–	5	.722	25	–	9	.735
Oklahoma State	12	–	6	.667	24	–	10	.706
Texas Tech	12	–	6	.667	26	–	8	.765
Colorado	11	–	7	.611	22	–	12	.647
Iowa State	10	–	8	.556	22	–	10	.688
Utah	10	–	8	.556	19	–	13	.594
BYU	9	–	9	.500	26	–	12	.684
Arizona State	9	–	9	.500	24	–	11	.686
Kansas	8	–	10	.444	22	–	14	.611
Kansas State	8	–	10	.444	19	–	18	.514
Cincinnati	6	–	12	.333	11	–	20	.355
UCF	3	–	15	.167	11	–	19	.367
Arizona	3	–	15	.167	12	–	18	.400
Houston	1	–	17	.056	7	–	23	.233
† 2026 Big 12 tournament winner Rankings from AP poll

The 2025–26 Kansas State Wildcats women's basketball team currently represent Kansas State University in the 2025–26 NCAA Division I women's basketball season. The Wildcats are led by 12th-year head coach Jeff Mittie. They play their home games at Bramlage Coliseum in Manhattan, Kansas, as members of the Big 12 Conference.

== Previous season ==
The Wildcats finished the 2024–25 season 28–8, 13–5 in Big 12 play to finish in a three way tied for fourth place. As the No. 5 seed in the Big 12 tournament, they defeated UCF in the second round before losing in the quarterfinals to West Virginia. They received an at-large bid to the NCAA Tournament as the No. 5 seed as the Spokane region 4 where they defeated Fairfield and Kentucky in the first and second rounds to advance to the sweet sixteen for the first time since 2002, where they lost to USC.

== Offseason ==
=== Departures ===
Kansas State Departures
Name	Number	Pos.	Height	Year	Hometown	Reason for Departure
Zyanna Walker	1	G	5'8"	(redshirt) Sophomore	Wichita, KS	Transferred to Colorado
Temira Poindexter	2	G	6'2"	Senior	Sapulpa, OK	Graduated
Jaelyn Glenn	3	G	6'1"	Senior	Kansas City, MO	Graduated
Serena Sundell	4	G	6'2"	Senior	Maryville, MO	Graduated/2025 WNBA draft; selected 26th overall by Seattle Storm
Brylee Glenn	5	G	5'11"	Senior	Kansas City, MO	Transferred to Minnesota
Kennedy Taylor	12	F	6'2"	Senior	Shawnee Mission, KS	Graduated
Eliza Maupin	21	F	6'3"	Junior	Webster Groves, MO	Transferred to Nebraska
Gisela Sanchez	30	F	6'4"	(redshirt) Junior	Barcelona, Spain	Transferred to Notre Dame
Imani Lester	32	F	6'4"	(redshirt) Sophomore	Raleigh, NC	Transferred to Rutgers
Finley Ohnstad	33	G	6'1"	Freshman	Elko New Market, MN	Transferred to North Dakota
Ayoka Lee	50	C	6'6"	Graduate Student	Byron, MN	Graduated

=== Incoming ===
Kansas State incoming transfers
Name	Num	Pos.	Height	Year	Hometown	Previous School
Izela Arenas	0	G	5'9"	Sophomore	Porter Ranch, CA	Louisvile
Ramiya White	22	C	6'5"	Sophomore	Louisville, KY	Virginia Tech
Jenessa Cotton	24	F	6'2"	Sophomore	Orange, CA	Duke
Tess Heal	34	G	5'10"	Senior	Melbourne, Australia	Stanford

=== Recruiting Classes ===
College recruiting
Name	Hometown	School	Height	Weight	Commit date
Jordan Speiser; G	Warrenton, MO	Lutheran High School	6 ft 1 in (1.85 m)	N/A	Sep 13, 2024
Jordan Speiser; G	Recruit ratings: 247Sports: ESPN: (96)				
Aniya Foy; G	Katy, TX	Cinco Ranch High School	5 ft 11 in (1.80 m)	N/A	Mar 30, 2025
Aniya Foy; G	Recruit ratings: 247Sports: ESPN: (94)				
Brandie Harrod; G	Oklahoma City, OK	Putnam City North High School	6 ft 0 in (1.83 m)	N/A	Apr 6, 2024
Brandie Harrod; G	Recruit ratings: 247Sports: ESPN: (93)				
Overall recruit ranking:
Note: In many cases, Scout, Rivals, 247Sports, On3, and ESPN may conflict in their listings of height and weight.; In these cases, the average was taken. ESPN grades are on a 100-point scale.; Sources: "2026 Player Commits". ESPN. Archived from the original on October 7, 2025.

== Roster ==
2025–26 Kansas State Wildcats women's basketball team
Players
Coaches

Pos.	#	Name	Height	Year	Previous school	Hometown
G	0	Izela Arenas	5 ft 9 in (1.75 m)	So	Sierra Canyon School; Louisville	Porter Ranch, CA
G	3	Brandie Harrod	6 ft 1 in (1.85 m)	Fr	Putnam City North High School	Oklahoma City, OK
G	4	Nastja Claessens	6 ft 1 in (1.85 m)	Jr		Waregem, Belgium
G	5	Aniya Foy	5 ft 11 in (1.8 m)	Fr	Cinco Ranch High School	Katy, TX
G	6	Gina Garcia	5 ft 10 in (1.78 m)	Fr	Segle XXI	Barcelona, Spain
G	10	Mikayla Parks	5 ft 10 in (1.78 m)	RS So	Norman High School	Norman, OK
G	11	Taryn Sides	5 ft 7 in (1.7 m)	Jr	Phillipsburg High School	Phillipsburg, KS
C	22	Ramiya White	6 ft 5 in (1.96 m)	So	Butler Traditional High School; Virginia Tech	Louisville, KY
G	23	Jordan Speiser	6 ft 1 in (1.85 m)	Fr	Lutheran of St. Charles County	Warrenton, MO
F	24	Jenessa Cotton	6 ft 2 in (1.88 m)	So	Mater Dei High School; Duke	Orange, CA
G	34	Tess Heal	5 ft 10 in (1.78 m)	Sr	Lowther Hall Anglican Grammar School; Stanford	Melbourne, Australia
F	35	Alexis Hess	6 ft 1 in (1.85 m)	RS Fr	Fleetwood Area High School	Blandon, PA

Head coach

- Jeff Mittie (Missouri Western)

Assistant coach(es)

- Ebony Gilliam (TCU)
- Ebony Haliburton (Oral Roberts)
- Staci Gregorio Foss (San Diego Mesa)

Legend

- (C) Team captain
- (S) Suspended
- (I) Ineligible
- (W) Walk-on
- Injured
- Current redshirt

Roster

== Schedule and results ==
Date time, TV	Rank^{#}	Opponent^{#}	Result	Record	High points	High rebounds	High assists	Site (attendance) city, state
Exhibition
October 27, 2025*; 7:00 p.m., ESPN+		at Tarleton State	W 78–57		22 – Arenas	9 – Sides	6 – Sides	EECU Center (1,312); Stephenville, TX
Non-conference regular season
November 3, 2025*; 6:30 p.m., ESPN+		Omaha	W 100–35	1–0	18 – Arenas	8 – Cotton	12 – Sides	Bramlage Coliseum (3,207); Manhattan, KS
November 8, 2025*; 4:00 p.m., ACCNX		at SMU	W 46–44	2–0	8 – Tied	11 – Claessens	4 – Garcia	Moody Coliseum (1,233); Dallas, TX
November 10, 2025*; 6:30 p.m., ESPN+		Lamar	W 89–61	3–0	20 – Sides	10 – Speiser	5 – Sides	Bramlage Coliseum (3,204); Manhattan, KS
November 13, 2025*; 4:00 p.m., ESPN+		South Dakota	L 71–72	3–1	19 – Sides	8 – Sides	6 – Garcia	Bramlage Coliseum (2,996); Manhattan, KS
November 16, 2025*; 1:00 p.m., ESPN+		Texas A&M	L 72–77	3–2	15 – Heal	6 – Tied	3 – Tied	Bramlage Coliseum (3,676); Manhattan, KS
November 18, 2025*; 6:30 p.m., ESPN+		Troy	W 81–59	4–2	13 – Speiser	10 – Speiser	6 – Sides	Bramlage Coliseum (3,079); Manhattan, KS
November 22, 2025*; 1:00 p.m., ESPN+		at Green Bay	L 44–47	4–3	21 – Claessens	9 – Claessens	7 – Garcia	Kress Events Center (1,995); Green Bay, WI
November 27, 2025*; 12:30 p.m., FloHoops		vs. Columbia; Cancún Challenge Mayan Tournament	W 95–92	5–3	30 – Sides	9 – Harrod	8 – Garcia	Hard Rock Hotel Riviera Maya; Cancún, Mexico
November 28, 2025*; 10:00 a.m., FloHoops		vs. No. 12 North Carolina; Cancún Challenge Mayan Tournament	L 73–85	5–4	15 – Arenas	10 – Cotton	3 – Garcia	Hard Rock Hotel Riviera Maya (200); Cancún, Mexico
November 29, 2025*; 10:00 a.m., FloHoops		vs. South Dakota State; Cancún Challenge Mayan Tournament	L 70–82	5–5	27 – Sides	5 – Sides	7 – Garcia	Hard Rock Hotel Riviera Maya (230); Cancún, Mexico
December 7, 2025*; 2:00 p.m., ESPN+		vs. No. 13 Ole Miss; Bill Snyder Classic	W 61–60	6–5	19 – Speiser	7 – Sides	2 – Tied	St. Joseph Civic Arena (1,681); St. Joseph, MO
December 10, 2025*; 11:00 a.m., ESPN+		San Diego State	L 53–64	6–6	16 – Sides	9 – Harrod	5 – Sides	Bramlage Coliseum (6,824); Manhattan, KS
December 14, 2025*; 1:00 p.m., FS1		at Creighton	W 75–71	7–6	21 – Claessens	6 – Tied	6 – Garcia	D. J. Sokol Arena (1,254); Omaha, NE
Big 12 regular season
December 20, 2025; 4:00 p.m., ESPN+		at No. 9 TCU	L 55–77	7–7 (0–1)	10 – Tied	7 – Harrod	7 – Garcia	Schollmaier Arena (3,627); Fort Worth, TX
December 31, 2025; 1:00 p.m., ESPN+		Cincinnati	W 79–52	8–7 (1–1)	17 – Heal	8 – Tied	9 – Sides	Bramlage Coliseum (4,519); Manhattan, KS
January 4, 2026; 1:00 p.m., ESPN+		West Virginia	L 58–60	8–8 (1–2)	16 – Heal	7 – Cotton	6 – Garcia	Bramlage Coliseum (3,819); Manhattan, KS
January 7, 2026; 6:30 p.m., ESPN+		at Houston	W 71–62	9–8 (2–2)	31 – Heal	8 – Tied	4 – Garcia	Fertitta Center (1,395); Houston, TX
January 10, 2026; 4:00 p.m., ESPN+		Utah	L 73–80	9–9 (2–3)	25 – Heal	6 – Foy	5 – Tied	Bramlage Coliseum (3,820); Manhattan, KS
January 17, 2026; 1:00 p.m., ESPN+		at No. 17 Texas Tech	W 65–59	10–9 (3–3)	12 – Heal	7 – Speiser	4 – Garcia	United Supermarkets Arena (9,261); Lubbock, TX
January 21, 2026; 6:30 p.m., ESPN+		Houston	W 69–65	11–9 (4–3)	16 – Claessens	6 – Tied	4 – Heal	Bramlage Coliseum (3,497); Manhattan, KS
January 25, 2026; 1:00 p.m., FS1		at Kansas; Sunflower Showdown	L 61–83	11–10 (4–4)	26 – Sides	6 – Tied	5 – Sides	Allen Fieldhouse (6,129); Lawrence, KS
January 29, 2026; 6:30 p.m., ESPN+		Colorado	L 47–56	11–11 (4–5)	12 – Speiser	5 – Tied	4 – Garcia	Bramlage Coliseum (3,232); Manhattan, KS
February 1, 2026; 3:00 p.m., ESPN+		at Arizona State	W 74–67	12–11 (5–5)	21 – Sides	12 – Claessens	9 – Garcia	Desert Financial Arena (3,954); Tempe, AZ
February 4, 2026; 7:00 p.m., ESPN+		at Arizona	L 62–72	12–12 (5–6)	18 – Heal	9 – Heal	3 – Heal	McKale Center (5,646); Tucson, AZ
February 7, 2026; 4:00 p.m., ESPN+		BYU	W 77–52	13–12 (6–6)	25 – Claessens	10 – Harrod	13 – Sides	Bramlage Coliseum (4,139); Manhattan, KS
February 10, 2026; 6:30 p.m., ESPN+		Oklahoma State	W 70–61	14–12 (7–6)	18 – Claessens	8 – Foy	4 – Heard	Bramlage Coliseum (3,856); Manhattan, KS
February 15, 2026; 1:00 p.m., ESPN2		at Iowa State	L 72–76	14–13 (7–7)	23 – Sides	9 – Claessens	4 – Sides	Hilton Coliseum (10,746); Ames, IA
February 18, 2026; 6:00 p.m., ESPN+		at UCF	W 93–67	15–13 (8–7)	19 – Heal	6 – Heal	9 – Sides	Addition Financial Arena (1,059); Orlando, FL
February 21, 2026; 4:00 p.m., ESPN+		Kansas; Sunflower Showdown	L 68–75	15–14 (8–8)	19 – Heal	4 – Tied	7 – Heal	Bramlage Coliseum (4,845); Manhattan, KS
February 23, 2026; 7:00 p.m., ESPN2		at No. 18 Baylor	L 54–80	15–15 (8–9)	12 – Tied	6 – Claessens	5 – Garcia	Foster Pavilion (3,478); Waco, TX
March 1, 2026; 1:00 p.m., FS1		Iowa State	L 79–93	15–16 (8–10)	17 – Speiser	9 – Claessens	10 – Garcia	Bramlage Coliseum (7,423); Manhattan, KS
Big 12 Tournament
March 4, 2026; 11:00 a.m., ESPN+	(12)	vs. (13) Cincinnati; First round	W 91–66	16–16	20 – Tied	8 – Claessens	10 – Garcia	T-Mobile Center (4,328); Kansas City, MO
March 5, 2026; 11:00 a.m., ESPN+	(12)	vs. (5) No. 21 Texas Tech; Second round	W 58–51	17–16	14 – Claessens	8 – Classens	3 – Garcia	T-Mobile Center (4,603); Kansas City, MO
March 6, 2026; 11:00 a.m., ESPNU	(12)	vs. (4) Oklahoma State; Quarterfinals	W 74–73	18–16	21 – Speiser	5 – Tied	5 – Garcia	T-Mobile Center (3,812); Kansas City, MO
March 7, 2026; 3:00 p.m., ESPNU	(12)	vs. (1) No. 10 TCU; Semifinals	L 62–74	18–17	16 – Speiser	4 – Tied	4 – Garcia	T-Mobile Center (6,905); Kansas City, MO
WBIT
March 19, 2026*; 6:30 p.m., ESPN+	(2)	Georgia Tech; First Round	W 69–65	19–17	15 – Claessens	6 – Harrod	5 – Tied	Bramlage Coliseum (2,895); Manhattan, KS
March 22, 2026*; 6:00 p.m., ESPN+	(2)	(3) California; Second Round	L 75–83	19–18	13 – Sides	6 – Harrod	12 – Garcia	Bramlage Coliseum (2,625); Manhattan, KS
*Non-conference game. ^{#}Rankings from AP Poll. (#) Tournament seedings in parentheses. All times are in Central Time.

== Rankings ==
Ranking movements Legend: ██ Increase in ranking ██ Decrease in ranking — = Not ranked RV = Received votes
	Week																				
Poll	Pre	1	2	3	4	5	6	7	8	9	10	11	12	13	14	15	16	17	18	19	Final
AP	RV	RV	—																		
Coaches	25	RV	—																		
