= 2025–26 Southern Lady Jaguars basketball team =

American collegiate basketball team season

2025–26 Southern Lady Jaguars basketball
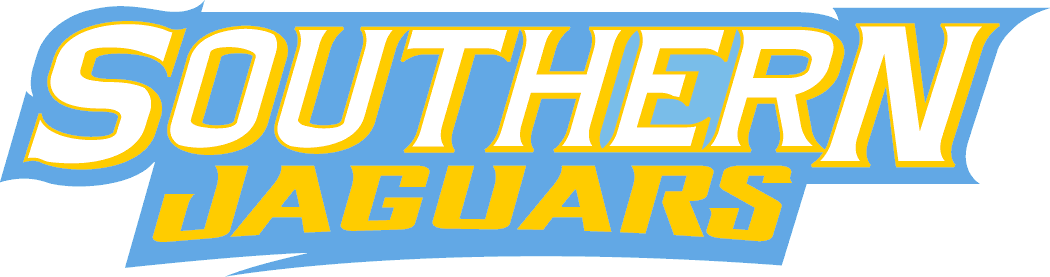

SWAC Tournament Champions

NCAA Tournament, First Round
- Conference: Southwestern Athletic Conference
- Record: 20–14 (12–6 SWAC)
- Head coach: Carlos Funchess (8th season)
- Assistant coaches: Jeremy Bonin; Patrece Carter; TJ Pugh
- Home arena: F. G. Clark Center

2025–26 SWAC women's basketball standings
	Conf.				Overall
Team	W		L	PCT	W		L	PCT
Alabama A&M	17	–	1	.944	22	–	11	.667
Alcorn State	14	–	4	.778	17	–	14	.548
Alabama State	12	–	6	.667	17	–	15	.531
Southern †	12	–	6	.667	20	–	14	.588
Jackson State	10	–	8	.556	12	–	19	.387
Grambling State	10	–	8	.556	13	–	19	.406
Arkansas–Pine Bluff	10	–	8	.556	15	–	16	.484
Florida A&M	7	–	11	.389	9	–	22	.290
Mississippi Valley State	6	–	12	.333	8	–	23	.258
Texas Southern	6	–	12	.333	10	–	21	.323
Bethune–Cookman	4	–	14	.222	7	–	26	.212
Prairie View A&M	0	–	18	.000	2	–	28	.067
† 2026 SWAC tournament winner

The 2025–26 Southern Lady Jaguars basketball team represented Southern University during the 2025–26 NCAA Division I women's basketball season. The Lady Jaguars, led by eighth-year head coach Carlos Funchess, played their home games at the F. G. Clark Center in Baton Rouge, Louisiana, as members of the Southwestern Athletic Conference.

== Previous season ==
The Lady Jaguars finished the 2024–25 season 21–13, 15–3 in SWAC play, to win the SWAC regular season title. They beat #9 seed Mississippi Valley State, Jackson State and Alcorn State to SWAC tournament as a result they received an automatic bid to the NCAA women's tournament where they defeated UC San Diego in the First Four before losing to UCLA in the first round.

== Preseason ==
On October 7, 2025, the SWAC released their preseason coaches poll. Southern was picked to finish atop the conference in the SWAC, receiving fourteen of the twenty-three first-place votes.

=== Preseason rankings ===
SWAC preseason poll
Predicted finish	Team	Votes (1st place)
1	Southern	265 (14)
2	Alabama A&M	224 (5)
3	Jackson State	213 (1)
4	Texas Southern	202 (1)
5	Grambling State	186 (2)
6	Alcorn State	164
7	Bethune–Cookman	119
8	Florida A&M	111
9	Alabama State	98
10	Prairie View A&M	93
11	Arkansas–Pine Bluff	63
12	Mississippi Valley State	56

=== Preseason All-SWAC Teams ===
No Lady Jaguars were named to the first or second Preseason All-SWAC teams.

== Roster ==
2025–26 Southern Lady Jaguars women's basketball team
Players
Coaches

Pos.	#	Name	Height	Year	Previous school	Hometown
G	0	Aubri Wilkins	5 ft 5 in (1.65 m)	RS Fr	Carver High School	Columbus, Georgia
G	1	Aniya Gourdine	5 ft 9 in (1.75 m)	Sr	Temple	Baltimore, Maryland
G	2	Jaylia Reed	5 ft 5 in (1.65 m)	GS	Mississippi Valley State	Hot Springs, Arkansas
G	3	Taniya Lawson	5 ft 8 in (1.73 m)	Sr	Texas Southern	Capitol Heights, Maryland
G	5	D'Shantae Edwards	5 ft 7 in (1.7 m)	Sr	Bethune–Cookman	Baltimore, Maryland
G	8	Mykayla Cunningham	5 ft 10 in (1.78 m)	Jr	Lindenwood	Salina, Kansas
G	10	Demonnie Lagway	5 ft 10 in (1.78 m)	Sr	Cal State Fullerton	Los Angeles, California
C	13	Anaja Hall	6 ft 5 in (1.96 m)	Jr	Alabama State	Atlanta, Georgia
G	20	Zaria Hurston	5 ft 10 in (1.78 m)	Jr	Coastal Carolina	Decatur, Georgia
G	23	Kiana Wilson	5 ft 7 in (1.7 m)	Sr	Florida SouthWestern State	Jacksonville, Florida
F	24	DeMya Porter	6 ft 1 in (1.85 m)	So	Bogue Chitto High School	Bogue Chitto, Mississippi
G	30	Olivia Delancy	6 ft 0 in (1.83 m)	Sr	Florida A&M	St. Petersburg, Florida
C	32	Xyllize Harrison	6 ft 4 in (1.93 m)	Sr	Garland High School	Garland, Texas

Head coach

- Carlos Funchess (Louisiana–Monroe)

Assistant coach(es)

- Jeremy Bonin
- Patrece Carter (Louisiana Christian)
- TJ Pugh (LSU)

Legend

- (C) Team captain
- (S) Suspended
- (I) Ineligible
- (W) Walk-on
- Injured
- Current redshirt

Roster

== Schedule and results ==
Date time, TV	Rank^{#}	Opponent^{#}	Result	Record	High points	High rebounds	High assists	Site (attendance) city, state
Non-conference regular season
November 3, 2025*; 6:30 p.m., B1G+		at No. 21 Iowa	L 51–86	0–1	14 – Hurston	4 – Hurston	5 – Cunningham	Carver–Hawkeye Arena (14,998); Iowa City, IA
November 5, 2025*; 6:30 p.m., ESPN+		at No. 14 Iowa State	L 58–85	0–2	14 – Hurston	6 – Tied	2 – Tied	Hilton Coliseum (8,908); Ames, IA
November 12, 2025*; 6:00 p.m., SECN+/ESPN+		at No. 13 Ole Miss	L 44–94	0–3	21 – Hurston	7 – Tate	5 – Cunningham	SJB Pavilion (2,299); Oxford, MS
November 18, 2025*; 6:00 p.m.		Tougaloo (MS)	W 67–38	1–3	13 – Lagway	13 – Tate	3 – Tied	F. G. Clark Center (2,419); Baton Rouge, LA
November 23, 2025*; 4:00 p.m., B1G+		at No. 3 UCLA	L 37–88	1–4	8 – Porter	4 – Porter	3 – Cunningham	Pauley Pavilion (3,712); Los Angeles, CA
November 25, 2025*; 6:00 p.m., B1G+		at No. 22 Washington	L 40–66	1–5	16 – Porter	9 – Porter	1 – Tied	Alaska Airlines Arena (2,000); Seattle, WA
December 3, 2025*; 7:00 p.m., ESPN+		at Arizona	W 63–57	2–5	16 – Porter	7 – Hurston	9 – Cunningham	McKale Center (5,245); Tucson, AZ
December 7, 2025*; 2:00 p.m., ESPN+		at Houston	W 70–62	3–5	11 – Tied	6 – Porter	7 – Cunningham	Fertitta Center (985); Houston, TX
December 12, 2025*; 11:00 a.m.		Southern–New Orleans	W 84–34	4–5	18 – Porter	8 – Tied	4 – Reed	F. G. Clark Center (2,860); Baton Rouge, LA
December 18, 2025*; 7:00 p.m., ESPN+		at No. 15 Baylor	L 60–77	4–6	11 – Reed	4 – Tied	3 – Tate	Foster Pavilion (3,074); Waco, TX
December 21, 2025*; 7:00 p.m., ACCNX/ESPN+		at SMU	L 62–74	4–7	15 – Reed	9 – Hurston	3 – Cunningham	Moody Coliseum (1,579); Dallas, TX
SWAC regular season
January 1, 2026; 2:00 p.m., SWAC TV		Prairie View A&M	W 70–55	5–7 (1–0)	14 – Tied	8 – Tate	3 – Dixon	F. G. Clark Center (3,765); Baton Rouge, LA
January 3, 2026; 2:30 p.m., SWAC TV		Texas Southern	W 64–45	6–7 (2–0)	11 – Hurston	8 – Hurston	3 – Cunningham	F. G. Clark Center (3,930); Baton Rouge, LA
January 8, 2026; 6:00 p.m., SWAC TV		at Bethune–Cookman	W 61–50	7–7 (3–0)	17 – Porter	13 – Hurston	5 – Cunningham	Moore Gymnasium (312); Daytona Beach, FL
January 10, 2026; 3:00 p.m., SWAC TV		at Florida A&M	L 57–60	7–8 (3–1)	10 – Tied	10 – Hurston	3 – Tied	Al Lawson Center (651); Tallahassee, FL
January 17, 2026; 2:00 p.m., SWAC TV		at Grambling State	W 60–43	8–8 (4–1)	16 – Porter	7 – Porter	2 – Tied	Fredrick C. Hobdy Assembly Center; Grambling, LA
January 22, 2026; 4:00 p.m., SWAC TV		Mississippi Valley State	W 69–46	9–8 (5–1)	13 – Reed	7 – Dixon	4 – Wilson	F. G. Clark Center (2,896); Baton Rouge, LA
January 24, 2026; 2:30 p.m., SWAC TV		Arkansas–Pine Bluff	W 80–65	10–8 (6–1)	19 – Porter	10 – Tate	8 – Cunningham	F. G. Clark Center (3,159); Baton Rouge, LA
January 29, 2026; 6:00 p.m., SWAC TV		at Jackson State	W 67–43	11–8 (7–1)	10 – Tied	5 – Hall	5 – Hurston	Williams Assembly Center (395); Jackson, MS
January 31, 2026; 1:00 p.m., SWAC TV		at Alcorn State	L 56–69	11–9 (7–2)	15 – Tate	12 – Tate	3 – Reed	Davey Whitney Complex (667); Lorman, MS
February 5, 2026; 6:00 p.m., SWAC TV		Alabama State	L 57–61	11–10 (7–3)	12 – Tate	9 – Tate	5 – Cunningham	F. G. Clark Center (2,952); Baton Rouge, LA
February 7, 2026; 2:30 p.m., SWAC TV		Alabama A&M	L 54–56	11–11 (7–4)	10 – Tied	8 – Porter	3 – Tied	F. G. Clark Center (3,125); Baton Rouge, LA
February 12, 2026; 6:00 p.m., SWAC TV		at Texas Southern	W 66–54	12–11 (8–4)	20 – Delancy	7 – Tate	4 – Dixon	H&PE Arena (478); Houston, TX
February 14, 2026; 2:00 p.m., SWAC TV		at Prairie View A&M	W 60–45	13–11 (9–4)	17 – Hurston	8 – Hurston	3 – Wilson	William J. Nicks Building (426); Prairie View, TX
February 21, 2026; 2:30 p.m., SWAC TV		Grambling State	W 59–45	14–11 (10–4)	17 – Porter	9 – Porter	7 – Cunningham	F. G. Clark Center (5,139); Baton Rouge, LA
February 26, 2026; 6:00 p.m., SWAC TV		Florida A&M	W 80–61	15–11 (11–4)	20 – Delancy	8 – Dixon	5 – Cunningham	F. G. Clark Center (3,159); Baton Rouge, LA
February 28, 2026; 12:00 p.m., SWAC TV		Bethune–Cookman	W 73–47	16–11 (12–4)	20 – Delancy	8 – Dixon	5 – Cunningham	F. G. Clark Center (3,152); Baton Rouge, LA
March 3, 2026; 5:00 p.m., SWAC TV		at Alabama State	L 63–65	16–12 (12–5)	13 – Reed	9 – Hurston	5 – Cunningham	Dunn–Oliver Acadome (725); Montgomery, AL
March 3, 2026; 5:00 p.m., SWAC TV		at Alabama A&M	L 61–64	16–13 (12–6)	17 – Tate	8 – Hurston	3 – Tied	Alabama A&M Events Center (1,387); Huntsville, AL
SWAC tournament
March 12, 2026*; 10:00 a.m., ESPN+	(4)	vs. (5) Jackson State; Quarterfinals	W 64–51	17–13	18 – Delancy	8 – Tate	4 – Cunningham	Gateway Center Arena (842); College Park, GA
March 13, 2026*; 10:00 a.m., ESPN+	(4)	vs. (1) Alabama A&M; Semifinals	W 51–49	18–13	10 – Tied	9 – Porter	4 – Cunningham	Gateway Center Arena (1,002); College Park, GA
March 14, 2026*; 12:00 p.m., ESPNU	(4)	vs. (3) Alabama State; Championship	W 73–56	19–13	13 – Hurston	8 – Tate	5 – Reed	Gateway Center Arena (1,582); College Park, GA
NCAA tournament
March 19, 2026*; 6:00 p.m., ESPN2	(16 S4)	vs. (16 S4) Samford; First Four	W 65–53	20–13	16 – Reed	12 – Porter	8 – Cunningham	Colonial Life Arena (736); Columbia, SC
March 21, 2026*; 12:00 p.m., ABC	(16 S4)	at (1 S4) No. 4 South Carolina; First Round	L 34–103	20–14	10 – Tate	8 – Tate	2 – Tied	Colonial Life Arena; Columbia, SC
*Non-conference game. ^{#}Rankings from AP poll. (#) Tournament seedings in parentheses. S4=Sacramento 4. All times are in Central.
