= 2025–26 Alabama State Lady Hornets basketball team =

American college basketball season

2025–26 Alabama State Lady Hornets basketball
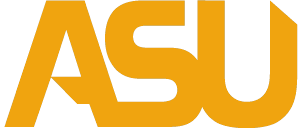
- Conference: Southwestern Athletic Conference
- Record: 17–15 (12–6 SWAC)
- Head coach: Johnetta Hayes (1st season)
- Associate head coach: Terrence "TJ" Royals
- Assistant coaches: Theo Howard; Janee'a Summers; Bianca Jackson
- Home arena: Dunn–Oliver Acadome

2025–26 SWAC women's basketball standings
	Conf.				Overall
Team	W		L	PCT	W		L	PCT
Alabama A&M	17	–	1	.944	22	–	11	.667
Alcorn State	14	–	4	.778	17	–	14	.548
Alabama State	12	–	6	.667	17	–	15	.531
Southern †	12	–	6	.667	20	–	14	.588
Jackson State	10	–	8	.556	12	–	19	.387
Grambling State	10	–	8	.556	13	–	19	.406
Arkansas–Pine Bluff	10	–	8	.556	15	–	16	.484
Florida A&M	7	–	11	.389	9	–	22	.290
Mississippi Valley State	6	–	12	.333	8	–	23	.258
Texas Southern	6	–	12	.333	10	–	21	.323
Bethune–Cookman	4	–	14	.222	7	–	26	.212
Prairie View A&M	0	–	18	.000	2	–	28	.067
† 2026 SWAC tournament winner

The 2025–26 Alabama State Lady Hornets basketball team represents Alabama State University during the 2025–26 NCAA Division I women's basketball season. The Lady Hornets, who are led by first-year head coach Johnetta Hayes, play their home games at the Dunn–Oliver Acadome in Montgomery, Alabama as members of the Southwestern Athletic Conference (SWAC).

== Previous season ==
The Lady Hornets finished the 2024–25 season 6–24, 4–14 in SWAC play, to finish in eleventh place. They failed to qualify for the SWAC tournament, as only the top eight teams in the conference qualify.

Freeman-Jackson announced her retirement from Alabama State on March 25, 2025, after 27 seasons. Rutgers assistant coach Johnetta Hayes, who was previously head coach at Texas Southern and UMBC, was hired by the Lady Hornets on April 11.

== Preseason ==
On October 7, 2025, the SWAC released their preseason coaches poll. Alabama State was picked to finish ninth in the SWAC.

=== Preseason rankings ===
SWAC preseason poll
Predicted finish	Team	Votes (1st place)
1	Southern	265 (14)
2	Alabama A&M	224 (5)
3	Jackson State	213 (1)
4	Texas Southern	202 (1)
5	Grambling State	186 (2)
6	Alcorn State	164
7	Bethune–Cookman	119
8	Florida A&M	111
9	Alabama State	98
10	Prairie View A&M	93
11	Arkansas–Pine Bluff	63
12	Mississippi Valley State	56

=== Preseason All-SWAC Teams ===
Preseason All-SWAC Teams
Team	Player	Position	Year
Second	Kaitlyn Bryant	Forward	Senior

== Roster ==
2025–26 Alabama State Lady Hornets women's basketball team
Players
Coaches

Pos.	#	Name	Height	Year	Previous school	Hometown
G	0	Amari Franklin	5 ft 8 in (1.73 m)	Sr	Bishop State Community College	Pensacola, Florida
F	1	Alanah Pooler	5 ft 9 in (1.75 m)	Jr	Shelton State Community College	Houston, Texas
G	2	Shamya Reid	5 ft 6 in (1.68 m)	Jr	Wabash Valley College	Detroit, Michigan
G/F	3	Takya Walters-Norman	6 ft 0 in (1.83 m)	Jr	Bishop State Community College	Montgomery, Alabama
F	4	Kaitlyn Bryant	5 ft 11 in (1.8 m)	Sr	Chipola College	Opelika, Alabama
G	5	Meagan Scott	5 ft 9 in (1.75 m)	Fr	Monsignor Scanlan High School	Bronx, New York
G	6	Ny'Keria Flowers	5 ft 4 in (1.63 m)	Fr	Northeast High School	Fort Lauderdale, Florida
F	7	Kaia Ponder	6 ft 0 in (1.83 m)	GS	Kansas City	Tulsa, Oklahoma
F	10	Charlese McClendon	5 ft 11 in (1.8 m)	Jr	East Georgia State College	Waycross, Georgia
G	11	Caylee Simpson	5 ft 6 in (1.68 m)	Jr	East Georgia State College	Columbus, Georgia
G	15	Ashley Gray	5 ft 10 in (1.78 m)	Sr	Washington County High School	Washington, Georgia
F/C	22	Clearia Peterson	5 ft 9 in (1.75 m)	So	Miami Dade College	Detroit, Michigan
G	23	Taylor Smith	5 ft 5 in (1.65 m)	GS	Alabama A&M	Fosters, Alabama
F	24	Samiah Puckett	6 ft 3 in (1.91 m)	Jr	East Tennessee State	Griffin, Georgia
F	33	Talayah Hamilton	5 ft 11 in (1.8 m)	Sr	Strom Thurmond High School	Johnston, South Carolina
F/C	34	Jaqueline Osei	6 ft 3 in (1.91 m)	Fr	Monsignor Scanlan High School	London, England

Head coach

- Johnetta Hayes (Rice)

Assistant coach(es)

- Terrence "TJ" Royals (Texas Southern)
- Theo Howard (UW–La Crosse)
- Janee'a Summers (UMBC)
- Bianca Jackson (Florida State)

Legend

- (C) Team captain
- (S) Suspended
- (I) Ineligible
- (W) Walk-on
- Injured
- Current redshirt

Roster
Last update: December 7, 2025

== Schedule and results ==
Date time, TV	Rank^{#}	Opponent^{#}	Result	Record	Site (attendance) city, state
Non-conference regular season
November 3, 2025*; 4:00 pm, SECN+		at Georgia	L 44–73	0–1	Stegeman Coliseum (2,328); Athens, GA
November 8, 2025*; 1:00 pm, SECN+/ESPN+		at Auburn	L 41–82	0–2	Neville Arena (2,770); Auburn, AL
November 10, 2025*; 6:00 pm		Talladega	W 72–55	1–2	Dunn–Oliver Acadome (381); Montgomery, AL
November 13, 2025*; 6:00 pm, ESPN+		at West Georgia	L 61–64	1–3	The Coliseum (414); Carrollton, GA
November 16, 2025*; 4:00 pm		Faulkner	L 71–77	1–4	Dunn–Oliver Acadome (350); Montgomery, AL
November 21, 2025*; 11:00 am, SECN+/ESPN+		at No. 17 Vanderbilt	L 38–92	1–5	Memorial Gymnasium (3,733); Nashville, TN
December 1, 2025*; 6:00 pm		Auburn Montgomery	W 70–41	2–5	Dunn–Oliver Acadome (332); Montgomery, AL
December 9, 2025*; 11:00 am, ESPN+		at No. 13 Baylor	L 36–90	2–6	Foster Pavilion (4,169); Waco, TX
December 12, 2025*; 6:00 pm		South Carolina State	W 59–53	3–6	Dunn–Oliver Acadome (372); Montgomery, AL
December 17, 2025*; 6:30 pm, SECN+/ESPN+		at Mississippi State	L 38–92	3–7	Humphrey Coliseum (3,733); Starkville, MS
December 28, 2025*; 3:00 pm, SECN+		at No. 5 LSU	L 41–109	3–8	Pete Maravich Assembly Center (11,170); Baton Rouge, LA
SWAC regular season
January 1, 2026; 2:00 pm		at Arkansas–Pine Bluff	W 71-65 ^{OT}	4-8 (1-0)	H.O. Clemmons Arena (278); Pine Bluff, AR
January 3, 2026; 3:00 pm		at Mississippi Valley State	W 83-50	5-8 (2-0)	Harrison HPER Complex (236); Itta Bena, MS
January 8, 2026; 6:00 pm		Alcorn State	L 40-49	5-9 (2-1)	Dunn–Oliver Acadome (355); Montgomery, AL
January 10, 2026; 1:00 pm		Jackson State	L 54-62	5-10 (2-2)	Dunn–Oliver Acadome (500); Montgomery, AL
January 19, 2026; 3:00 pm		vs. Alabama A&M; Bridge Builder Classic	L 41-50	5-11 (2-3)	Mitchell Center (1,425); Mobile, AL
January 22, 2026; 6:00 pm		at Texas Southern	W 82-74	6-11 (3-3)	H&PE Arena; Houston, TX
January 24, 2026; 2:00 pm		at Prairie View A&M	W 76-58	7-11 (4-3)	William Nicks Building; Prairie View, TX
January 29, 2026; 6:00 pm		Florida A&M	W 75-64	8-11 (5-3)	Dunn–Oliver Acadome (842); Montgomery, AL
January 31, 2026; 1:00 pm		Bethune–Cookman	W 78-60	9-11 (6-3)	Dunn–Oliver Acadome (575); Montgomery, AL
February 5, 2026; 6:00 pm		at Southern	W 61-57	10-11 (7-3)	F. G. Clark Center (2,952); Baton Rouge, LA
February 7, 2026; 2:00 pm		at Grambling State	L 53-67	10-12 (7-4)	Fredrick C. Hobdy Assembly Center (567); Grambling, LA
February 12, 2026; 6:00 pm		Mississippi Valley State	W 86-70	11-12 (8-4)	Dunn–Oliver Acadome (538); Montgomery, AL
February 14, 2026; 1:00 pm		Arkansas–Pine Bluff	W 79-71	12-12 (9-4)	Dunn–Oliver Acadome (1,222); Montgomery, AL
February 19, 2026; 3:30 pm		at Bethune–Cookman	W 61-60	13-12 (10-4)	Moore Gymnasium (184); Daytona Beach, FL
February 21, 2026; 3:00 pm		at Florida A&M	W 62-59	14-12 (11-4)	Al Lawson Center (1,001); Tallahassee, FL
February 28, 2026; 2:00 pm		at Alabama A&M	L 43-51	14-13 (11-5)	AAMU Events Center (6,175); Huntsville, AL
March 3, 2026; 5:00 pm		Southern	W 65-63	15-13 (12-5)	Dunn–Oliver Acadome (725); Montgomery, AL
March 5, 2026; 5:00 pm		Grambling State	L 50-68	15-14 (12-6)	Dunn–Oliver Acadome (777); Montgomery, AL
SWAC tournament
March 12, 2026; 4:30 p.m., ESPN+	(3)	vs. (6) Grambling State; Quarterfinals	W 56-50	16-14	Gateway Center Arena (1,025); College Park, GA
March 13, 2026; 4:30 p.m., ESPN+	(3)	vs. (7) Arkansas-Pine Bluff; Semifinals	W 72-59	17-14	Gateway Center Arena (1,072); College Park, GA
March 14, 2026; 1:00 p.m., ESPN+	(3)	vs. (4) Southern; Final	L 56-73	17-15	Gateway Center Arena (1,582); College Park, GA
*Non-conference game. ^{#}Rankings from AP Poll. (#) Tournament seedings in parentheses. All times are in Central.
