= 2025–26 Baylor Bears women's basketball team =

Intercollegiate basketball season

2025–26 Baylor Bears women's basketball

NCAA tournament, Second Round
- Conference: Big 12 Conference

Ranking
- Coaches: No. 21
- AP: No. 23
- Record: 25–9 (13–5 Big 12)
- Head coach: Nicki Collen (5th season)
- Associate head coach: Tony Greene; Johnnie Harris
- Assistant coaches: Aaron Sternecker; Jaelyn Richard Harris; Tez Dumars
- Home arena: Foster Pavilion

2025–26 Big 12 women's basketball standings
	Conf.				Overall
Team	W		L	PCT	W		L	PCT
No. 6 TCU	15	–	3	.833	32	–	6	.842
No. 18 West Virginia †	14	–	4	.778	28	–	7	.800
No. 23 Baylor	13	–	5	.722	25	–	9	.735
Oklahoma State	12	–	6	.667	24	–	10	.706
Texas Tech	12	–	6	.667	26	–	8	.765
Colorado	11	–	7	.611	22	–	12	.647
Iowa State	10	–	8	.556	22	–	10	.688
Utah	10	–	8	.556	19	–	13	.594
BYU	9	–	9	.500	26	–	12	.684
Arizona State	9	–	9	.500	24	–	11	.686
Kansas	8	–	10	.444	22	–	14	.611
Kansas State	8	–	10	.444	19	–	18	.514
Cincinnati	6	–	12	.333	11	–	20	.355
UCF	3	–	15	.167	11	–	19	.367
Arizona	3	–	15	.167	12	–	18	.400
Houston	1	–	17	.056	7	–	23	.233
† 2026 Big 12 tournament winner Rankings from AP poll

The 2025–26 Baylor Bears women's basketball team represents Baylor University during the 2025–26 NCAA Division I women's basketball season. The Bears are led by fifth-year head coach Nicki Collen and play their home games at Foster Pavilion in Waco, Texas. The Baylor Bears are competing as a member of the Big 12 Conference.

== Previous season ==
The Bears finished the 2024–25 season 28–8, 15–3 in Big 12 play to finish in second place. As the No. 2 seed in the Big 12 tournament, they defeated Iowa State in the quarterfinals and Oklahoma State in the semifinals before losing in the championship game TCU. They received an at-large bid to the NCAA Tournament as the No. 4 seed as the Spokane region 1 where they defeated Grand Canyon in the first round before losing to Ole Miss in the second round.

== Offseason ==
=== Departures ===
Baylor Departures
Name	Number	Pos.	Height	Year	Hometown	Reason for Departure
Yaya Felder	2	G	5'8"	Senior	Hartford, CT	Graduated
Madison Bartley	3	F	6'3"	Graduate Student	Kettering, OH	Graduated
Waiata Jennings	7	G	5'9"	Junior	Rotorua, New Zealand	Transferred to Alabama
Jada Walker	11	G	5'7"	Senior	Richmond, VA	Graduated
Aaronette Vonleh	21	C	6'3"	Senior	West Linn, OR	Graduated/went undrafted in 2025 WNBA draft; signed with the Dallas Wings
Sarah Andrews	24	G	5'6"	Graduate Student	Irving, TX	Graduated

=== Incoming ===
Baylor incoming transfers
Name	Num	Pos.	Height	Year	Hometown	Previous School
Taliah Scott	0	G	5'9"	(redshirt) Sophomore	Orange, FL	Auburn
Kiersten Johnson	2	F	6'4"	Senior	Duncanville, TX	Oklahoma
Ella Brow	3	G	5'8"	(redshirt) Junior	Palm Beach, Australia	SMU
Yuting Deng	7	G	6'0"	Sophomore	Hunan, China	Auburn
Kiera Pemberton	9	F	6'1"	Junior	Langley, BC	North Dakota

=== Recruiting ===
College recruiting
Name	Hometown	School	Height	Weight	Commit date
Marcayla Johnson; G	Tulsa, OK	Booker T. Washington High School	6 ft 0 in (1.83 m)	N/A	
Marcayla Johnson; G	Recruit ratings: ESPN: (94)				
Overall recruit ranking:
Note: In many cases, Scout, Rivals, 247Sports, On3, and ESPN may conflict in their listings of height and weight.; In these cases, the average was taken. ESPN grades are on a 100-point scale.; Sources: "2025 Player Commits". ESPN. Archived from the original on October 4, 2024.

== Roster ==
2025–26 Baylor Bears women's basketball team
Players
Coaches

Pos.	#	Name	Height	Year	Previous school	Hometown
G	0	Taliah Scott	5 ft 9 in (1.75 m)	RS So	St. Johns Country Day School; Auburn	Orange Park, FL
G	1	Ines Goryanova	5 ft 8 in (1.73 m)	RS Fr	DME Academy	Sofia, Bulgaria
F	2	Kiersten Johnson	6 ft 4 in (1.93 m)	Jr	Duncanville HS	Duncanville, TX
G	3	Ella Brow	5 ft 8 in (1.73 m)	RS Jr	Palm Beach Currumbin; SMU	Palm Beach, Australia
G	4	Jana Van Gytenbeek	5 ft 7 in (1.7 m)	GS	Stanford	Greenwood Village, CO
G/F	5	Darianna Littlepage-Buggs	6 ft 1 in (1.85 m)	Sr	Classen HS	Edmond, OK
G	7	Yuting Deng	6 ft 0 in (1.83 m)	So	FIBA China; Auburn	Hunan, China
F	8	Kayla Nelms	6 ft 1 in (1.85 m)	So	Miami Country Day HS	Miami, FL
F	9	Kiera Pemberton	6 ft 1 in (1.85 m)	Jr	Walnut Grove Secondary School; Notre Dakota	Langley, British Columbia
F	12	Kyla Abraham	6 ft 3 in (1.91 m)	RS Jr	Smithfield HS	Carrollton, VA
G	21	Marcayla Johnson	6 ft 0 in (1.83 m)	Fr	Booker T. Washington HS	Tulsa, OK
G/F	22	Bella Fontleroy	6 ft 0 in (1.83 m)	Sr	Kickapoo HS	Springfield, MO

Head coach

- Nicki Collen (Marquette)

Assistant coach(es)

- Tony Greene (Langston)
- Johnnie Harris (Arkansas Baptist)
- Aaron Sternecker (Florida)
- Jaelyn Richard Harris (LSU)
- Tez Dumars (West Texas A&M)

Legend

- (C) Team captain
- (S) Suspended
- (I) Ineligible
- (W) Walk-on
- Injured
- Current redshirt

Roster

== Schedule and results ==
Date time, TV	Rank^{#}	Opponent^{#}	Result	Record	High points	High rebounds	High assists	Site (attendance) city, state
Exhibition
October 25, 2025*; 4:00 p.m.	No. 16	West Texas A&M	W 86–46		–	–	–	Foster Pavilion; Waco, TX
Non-conference regular season
November 3, 2025*; 11:00 a.m., ESPN	No. 16	vs. No. 7 Duke; Oui-Play	W 58–52	1–0	24 – Scott	10 – Littlepage-Buggs	4 – Van Gytenbeek	Adidas Arena (5,712); Paris, France
November 9, 2025*; 2:00 p.m., ESPN+	No. 16	Lindenwood	W 76–63	2–0	29 – Scott	8 – Fontleroy	6 – Van Gytenbeek	Foster Pavilion (3,251); Waco, TX
November 14, 2025*; 8:30 p.m., CBSSN	No. 7	at UNLV	W 62–54	3–0	23 – Scott	12 – Littlepage-Buggs	5 – Scott	Cox Pavilion (2,464); Paradise, NV
November 16, 2025*; 2:00 p.m., ESPN+	No. 7	Le Moyne	W 99–43	4–0	26 – Littlepage-Buggs	11 – Littlepage-Buggs	9 – Scott	Foster Pavilion (3,360); Waco, TX
November 20, 2025*; 8:00 p.m., ESPN2	No. 7	vs. No. 19 Iowa; WBCA Showcase	L 52–57	4–1	32 – Scott	12 – Littlepage-Buggs	4 – Van Gytenbeek	State Farm Field House (2,532); Bay Lake, FL
November 22, 2025*; 4:30 p.m., ESPN+	No. 7	vs. Davidson; WBCA Showcase	W 74–72 ^{OT}	5–1	22 – Scott	11 – K. Johnson	5 – Van Gytenbeek	State Farm Field House; Bay Lake, FL
November 26, 2025*; 2:00 p.m., ESPN+	No. 15	Louisiana Tech	W 75–46	6–1	21 – Scott	12 – Littlepage-Buggs	5 – Van Gytenbeek	Foster Pavilion (3,247); Waco, TX
November 30, 2025*; 2:00 p.m., ESPN+	No. 15	Grambling State	W 76–35	7–1	17 – Scott	16 – Littlepage-Buggs	7 – Van Gytenbeek	Foster Pavilion (3,121); Waco, TX
December 3, 2025*; 7:00 p.m., ESPN+	No. 14	Southeastern Louisiana	W 112–47	8–1	23 – Scott	14 – Littlepage-Buggs	12 – Van Gytenbeek	Foster Pavilion (3,158); Waco, TX
December 7, 2025*; 2:00 p.m., ESPN+	No. 14	UTSA	W 73–55	9–1	19 – Scott	6 – Fontleroy	3 – Tied	Foster Pavilion (3,242); Waco, TX
December 9, 2025*; 11:00 a.m., ESPN+	No. 13	Alabama State	W 90–36	10–1	30 – Scott	10 – Tied	13 – Van Gytenbeek	Foster Pavilion (4,169); Waco, TX
December 14, 2025*; 12:00 p.m., ABC	No. 13	vs. No. 2 Texas; Sprouts Farmers Market espnW Invitational	L 54–89	10–2	9 – Tied	14 – Littlepage-Buggs	7 – Van Gytenbeek	Dickies Arena (3,116); Fort Worth, TX
December 18, 2025*; 7:00 p.m., ESPN+	No. 15	Southern	W 77–60	11–2	21 – Fontleroy	12 – Littlepage-Buggs	10 – Van Gytenbeek	Foster Pavilion (3,074); Waco, TX
Big 12 regular season
December 21, 2025; 3:00 p.m., ESPN+	No. 15	Texas Tech	L 60–61	11–3 (0–1)	22 – Deng	7 – Littlepage-Buggs	7 – Van Gytenbeek	Foster Pavilion (3,935); Waco, TX
December 31, 2025; 2:00 p.m., ESPN+	No. 22	at Oklahoma State	W 77–68	12–3 (1–1)	24 – Scott	8 – Nelms	8 – Van Gytenbeek	Gallagher-Iba Arena (4,259); Stillwater, OK
January 4, 2026; 4:00 p.m., ESPN2	No. 22	at No. 10 Iowa State	W 72–70	13–3 (2–1)	21 – Scott	20 – Littlepage-Buggs	7 – Van Gytenbeek	Hilton Coliseum (10,832); Ames, IA
January 8, 2026; 7:00 p.m., ESPN+	No. 16	Colorado	W 56–52	14–3 (3–1)	13 – Deng	12 – Littlepage-Buggs	7 – Van Gytenbeek	Foster Pavilion (3,172); Waco, TX
January 11, 2026; 2:00 p.m., ESPN+	No. 16	Kansas	W 79–64	15–3 (4–1)	24 – Scott	13 – Littlepage-Buggs	6 – Littlepage-Buggs	Foster Pavilion (3,651); Waco, TX
January 14, 2026; 8:00 p.m., ESPN+	No. 18	at Utah	W 61–45	16–3 (5–1)	14 – Scott	9 – Tied	6 – Van Gytenbeek	Jon M. Huntsman Center (2,862); Salt Lake City, UT
January 17, 2026; 3:00 p.m., ESPN+	No. 18	at BYU	W 69–58	17–3 (6–1)	25 – Scott	9 – Littlepage-Buggs	5 – Scott	Marriott Center (3,251); Provo, UT
January 21, 2026; 7:00 p.m., ESPN+	No. 14	UCF	W 73–48	18–3 (7–1)	22 – Scott	18 – Littlepage-Buggs	7 – Van Gytenbeek	Foster Pavilion (3,192); Waco, TX
January 27, 2026; 7:00 p.m., ESPN+	No. 14	Houston	W 82–66	19–3 (8–1)	25 – Littlepage-Buggs	12 – Fontleroy	7 – Van Gytenbeek	Foster Pavilion (3,438); Waco, TX
February 1, 2026; 11:00 a.m., ESPN	No. 14	at No. 22 West Virginia	L 60–70	19–4 (8–2)	18 – Scott	8 – Littlepage-Buggs	3 – Van Gytenbeek	Hope Coliseum (6,034); Morgantown, WV
February 4, 2026; 5:30 p.m., ESPN+	No. 15	at Cincinnati	W 76–70	20–4 (9–2)	26 – Scott	12 – Littlepage-Buggs	4 – Tied	Fifth Third Arena (1,674); Cincinnati, OH
February 7, 2026; 5:00 p.m., FS1	No. 15	Arizona State	W 67–64	21–4 (10–2)	17 – Scott	12 – Littlepage-Buggs	5 – Van Gytenbeek	Foster Pavilion (4,213); Waco, TX
February 12, 2026; 6:00 p.m., ESPN	No. 12	No. 17 TCU	L 67–83	21–5 (10–3)	22 – Scott	5 – Littlepage-Buggs	6 – Van Gytenbeek	Foster Pavilion (5,758); Waco, TX
February 15, 2026; 1:00 p.m., ESPN+	No. 12	at UCF	W 93–63	22–5 (11–3)	26 – Scott	8 – Littlepage-Buggs	11 – Van Gytenbeek	Addition Financial Arena (1,329); Orlando, FL
February 18, 2026; 6:00 p.m., ESPN+	No. 15	at No. 20 Texas Tech	L 56–87	22–6 (11–4)	13 – Tied	6 – K. Johnson	3 – Tied	United Supermarkets Arena (5,020); Lubbock, TX
February 21, 2026; 7:00 p.m., ESPN+	No. 15	Arizona	W 74–60	23–6 (12–4)	22 – Scott	10 – Fontleroy	8 – Van Gytenbeek	Foster Pavilion (3,840); Waco, TX
February 23, 2026; 6:00 p.m., ESPN2	No. 18	Kansas State	W 80–54	24–6 (13–4)	20 – Scott	11 – Littlepage-Buggs	8 – Van Gytenbeek	Foster Pavilion (3,478); Waco, TX
March 1, 2026; 3:00 p.m., ESPN	No. 18	at No. 11 TCU	L 53–65	24–7 (13–5)	17 – Scott	8 – Littlepage-Buggs	4 – Scott	Schollmaier Arena (6,330); Fort Worth, TX
Big 12 Tournament
March 6, 2026; 8:00 p.m., ESPN+	(3) No. 20	vs. (6) Colorado; Quarterfinals	L 53–62	24–8	14 – Scott	10 – Littlepage-Buggs	3 – Brow	T-Mobile Center (4,771); Kansas City, MO
NCAA Tournament
March 20, 2026*; 1:00 p.m., ESPN	(6 S2) No. 21	vs. (11 S2) Nebraska; First Round	W 67–62	25–8	15 – Scott	11 – Littlepage-Buggs	4 – Van Gytenbeek	Cameron Indoor Stadium (3,455); Durham, NC
March 22, 2026*; 4:00 p.m., ESPN	(6 S2) No. 21	at (3 S2) No. 8 Duke; Second Round	L 46–69	25–9	13 – Scott	9 – Littlepage-Buggs	2 – Littlepage-Buggs	Cameron Indoor Stadium (3,907); Durham, NC
*Non-conference game. ^{#}Rankings from AP Poll. (#) Tournament seedings in parentheses. S2=Sacramento 2. All times are in Central Time.

== Rankings ==
Ranking movements Legend: ██ Increase in ranking ██ Decrease in ranking
	Week																				
Poll	Pre	1	2	3	4	5	6	7	8	9	10	11	12	13	14	15	16	17	18	19	Final
AP	16	7	7	15	14	13	15	22	22*	16	18	14	14	15	12	15	18	20	21	21	23
Coaches	18	14	10	16	15	14	15	20	21	16	17	14	14	15	11	14	16	18	21	21	Not released

*AP did not release a week 8 poll.

== See also ==
- 2025–26 Baylor Bears men's basketball team
