= 2025–26 LSU Tigers women's basketball team =

American college basketball season

2025–26 LSU Tigers women's basketball

Paradise Jam Reef Division champions

NCAA Tournament, Sweet Sixteen
- Conference: Southeastern Conference

Ranking
- Coaches: No. 5
- AP: No. 5
- Record: 29–6 (12–4 SEC)
- Head coach: Kim Mulkey (5th season)
- Associate head coach: Bob Starkey
- Assistant coaches: Daphne Mitchell; Gary Redus II; Kaylin Rice; Seimone Augustus
- Home arena: Pete Maravich Assembly Center

2025–26 SEC women's basketball standings
	Conf.				Overall
Team	W		L	PCT	W		L	PCT
No. 4 South Carolina	15	–	1	.938	33	–	3	.917
No. 6 Vanderbilt	13	–	3	.813	29	–	5	.853
No. 3 Texas †	13	–	3	.813	33	–	3	.917
No. 5 LSU	12	–	4	.750	29	–	6	.829
No. 10 Oklahoma	11	–	5	.688	26	–	7	.788
Tennessee	8	–	8	.500	16	–	14	.533
No. 19 Ole Miss	8	–	8	.500	24	–	12	.667
No. 24 Georgia	8	–	8	.500	22	–	10	.688
No. 16 Kentucky	8	–	8	.500	25	–	10	.714
Texas A&M	7	–	9	.438	14	–	13	.519
Alabama	7	–	9	.438	24	–	11	.686
Florida	5	–	11	.313	18	–	15	.545
Mississippi State	5	–	11	.313	18	–	13	.581
Missouri	4	–	12	.250	17	–	17	.500
Auburn	3	–	13	.188	15	–	17	.469
Arkansas	1	–	15	.063	12	–	20	.375
† 2026 SEC tournament winner As of March 27, 2026; Rankings from AP poll

The 2025–26 LSU Tigers women's basketball team represented Louisiana State University during the 2025–26 NCAA Division I women's basketball season. The Tigers, led by fifth-year head coach Kim Mulkey, played their home games at Pete Maravich Assembly Center as a member of the Southeastern Conference (SEC).

== Previous season ==
The Tigers finished the 2024–25 season 31–6, 12–4 in SEC play to finish in third place. As the No. 3 seed in the SEC tournament, they defeated Florida in the quarterfinals before losing to Texas in the semifinals. They received an at-large bid to the NCAA Tournament as the No. 3 seed in the Spokane 1 region. They defeated San Diego State and Florida State in the first and second rounds, NC State in the sweet sixteen before losing to UCLA in the elite eight.

== Offseason ==
=== Departures ===
LSU Departures
Name	Number	Pos.	Height	Year	Hometown	Reason for departure
Mjracle Sheppard	1	G	5'10"	Sophomore	Kent, WA	Transferred to California
Amani Bartlett	2	F	6'3"	Senior	Cleveland, TX	Transferred to Houston
Sa'Myah Smith	5	F	6'2"	(redshirt) Sophomore	DeSoto, TX	Transferred to Virginia
Jersey Wolfenbarger	8	G/F	6'5"	Junior	Fort Smith, AR	Transferred to Tennessee
Last-Tear Poa	13	G	5'11"	Senior	Melbourne, Australia	Transferred to Arizona State
Aalyah Del Rosario	23	C	6'6"	Sophomore	Bronx, NY	Transferred to Vanderbilt
Aneesah Morrow	24	G	6'1"	Senior	Chicago, IL	Graduated/2025 WNBA draft; selected 7th overall by Connecticut Sun
Shayeann Day-Wilson	50	G	5'6"	Senior	Toronto, ON	Graduated

=== Incoming transfers ===
LSU incoming transfers
Name	Number	Pos.	Height	Year	Hometown	Previous school
Amiya Joyner	1	F	6'2"	Senior	Farmville, NC	East Carolina
Kate Koval	13	F	6'5"	Sophomore	Kyiv, Ukraine	Notre Dame
MiLaysia Fulwiley	23	G	5'10"	Junior	Columbia, SC	South Carolina

=== 2025 recruiting class ===
College recruiting information
Name	Hometown	School	Height	Weight	Commit date
Grace Knox; W	Etiwanda, CA	Etiwanda High School	6 ft 2 in (1.88 m)	N/A	
Grace Knox; W	Recruit ratings: ESPN: (97)				
ZaKiyah Johnson; G	Shelbyville, KY	Sacred Heart Academy	6 ft 0 in (1.83 m)	N/A	
ZaKiyah Johnson; G	Recruit ratings: ESPN: (97)				
Divine Bourrage; G	Davenport, IA	Davenport North High School	5 ft 10 in (1.78 m)	N/A	
Divine Bourrage; G	Recruit ratings: ESPN: (96)				
Isabella Hines; G	Albuquerque, NM	Eldorado High School	5 ft 9 in (1.75 m)	N/A	
Isabella Hines; G	Recruit ratings: ESPN: (95)				
Overall recruit ranking:
Note: In many cases, Scout, Rivals, 247Sports, On3, and ESPN may conflict in their listings of height and weight.; In these cases, the average was taken. ESPN grades are on a 100-point scale.; Sources: "2025 Player Commits". ESPN. Archived from the original on September 29, 2025.

== Roster ==
2025–26 LSU Tigers women's basketball team
Players
Coaches

Pos.	#	Name	Height	Year	Previous school	Hometown
F	1	Amiya Joyner	6 ft 2 in (1.88 m)	Sr	Farmville Central HS; East Carolina	Farmville, NC (United States) (North Carolina)
F	2	Grace Knox	6 ft 2 in (1.88 m)	Fr	Etiwanda HS	Las Vegas, NV (United States) (Nevada)
G	3	Bella Hines	5 ft 10 in (1.78 m)	Fr	Eldorado HS	Albuquerque, NM (United States) (New Mexico)
G	4	Flau'jae Johnson	5 ft 10 in (1.78 m)	Sr	Sprayberry HS	Savannah, GA (United States) (Georgia (U.S. state))
G	6	Divine Bourrage	5 ft 11 in (1.8 m)	Fr	Davenport North HS	Davenport, IA (United States) (Iowa)
G	11	ZaKiyah Johnson	6 ft 0 in (1.83 m)	Fr	Sacred Heart Academy	Shelbyville, KY (United States) (Kentucky)
G	12	Mikaylah Williams	6 ft 0 in (1.83 m)	Jr	Parkway HS	Bossier City, LA (United States) (Louisiana)
F	13	Kate Koval	6 ft 5 in (1.96 m)	So	Long Island Lutheran HS; Notre Dame	Kyiv, Ukraine
G	14	Izzy Besselman	5 ft 10 in (1.78 m)	Sr	Episcopal School	Baton Rouge, LA (United States) (Louisiana)
F	15	Meghan Yarnevich	6 ft 0 in (1.83 m)	Fr	The Bullis School	Potomac, MD (United States) (Maryland)
G	16	Kailyn Gilbert	5 ft 8 in (1.73 m)	Sr	IMG Academy; Arizona	Tampa, FL (United States) (Florida)
G	23	MiLaysia Fulwiley	5 ft 10 in (1.78 m)	Jr	W.J. Keenan HS; South Carolina	Columbia, SC (United States) (South Carolina)
G	30	Jada Richard	5 ft 6 in (1.68 m)	So	Lafayette Christian Academy	Lafayette, LA (United States) (Louisiana)

Head coach

- Kim Mulkey (Louisiana Tech)

Assistant coach(es)

- Bob Starkey
- Daphne Mitchell (Georgia Tech)
- Gary Redus II (South Alabama)
- Kaylin Rice (Baylor)
- Seimone Augustus (LSU)

Legend

- (C) Team captain
- (S) Suspended
- (I) Ineligible
- (W) Walk-on
- Injured
- Current redshirt

Roster

== Schedule and results ==
Date time, TV	Rank^{#}	Opponent^{#}	Result	Record	High points	High rebounds	High assists	Site (attendance) city, state
Exhibition
October 23, 2025*; 7:00 p.m., SECN+/ESPN+	No. 5	Mississippi College	W 148–46		25 – Z. Johnson	10 – Tied	7 – Williams	Pete Maravich Assembly Center; Baton Rouge, LA
October 30, 2025*; 7:00 p.m., SECN+/ESPN+	No. 5	Langston	W 121–41		24 – Joyner	11 – Tied	5 – Bourrage	Pete Maravich Assembly Center (2,387); Baton Rouge, LA
Non-conference regular season
November 4, 2025*; 7:00 p.m., SECN+/ESPN+	No. 5	Houston Christian	W 108–55	1–0	21 – Fulwiley	11 – Z. Johnson	7 – Williams	Pete Maravich Assembly Center (9,431); Baton Rouge, LA
November 6, 2025*; 7:00 p.m., SECN+/ESPN+	No. 5	Southeastern Louisiana	W 115–26	2–0	17 – F. Johnson	9 – Koval	5 – Tied	Pete Maravich Assembly Center (9,540); Baton Rouge, LA
November 9, 2025*; 1:00 p.m., ESPN+	No. 5	at Georgia Southern	W 118–70	3–0	19 – Tied	14 – Koval	7 – Richard	Hill Convocation Center (5,322); Statesboro, GA
November 12, 2025*; 7:00 p.m., SECN+/ESPN+	No. 5	Charlotte	W 117–59	4–0	22 – Fulwiley	12 – Koval	3 – Richard	Pete Maravich Assembly Center (9,348); Baton Rouge, LA
November 17, 2025*; 6:00 p.m., ESPNU	No. 5	at Tulane	W 101–71	5–0	22 – F. Johnson	7 – Joyner	6 – Fulwiley	Devlin Fieldhouse (3,621); New Orleans, LA
November 20, 2025*; 7:00 p.m., SECN+/ESPN+	No. 5	Alcorn State	W 112–49	6–0	18 – Tied	12 – Koval	5 – Hines	Pete Maravich Assembly Center (9,575); Baton Rouge, LA
November 28, 2025*; 7:00 p.m., ESPN+	No. 5	vs. Marist; Paradise Jam Reef Division semifinals	W 113–53	7–0	19 – Z. Johnson	10 – Tied	4 – Bourrage	Sports and Fitness Center (2,224); St. Thomas, USVI
November 29, 2025*; 6:30 p.m., ESPN+	No. 5	vs. Washington State; Paradise Jam Reef Division Championship Game	W 112–35	8–0	16 – F. Johnson	12 – Joyner	5 – Fulwiley	Sports and Fitness Center (2,424); St. Thomas, USVI
December 4, 2025*; 8:00 p.m., ESPN	No. 5	at Duke; ACC–SEC Challenge	W 93–77	9–0	18 – F. Johnson	5 – Tied	7 – Williams	Cameron Indoor Stadium (4,871); Durham, NC
December 7, 2025*; 3:00 p.m., ESPN+	No. 5	at New Orleans	W 126–62	10–0	22 – Koval	12 – Knox	8 – Tied	Lakefront Arena (1,588); New Orleans, LA
December 13, 2025*; 5:00 p.m., ESPNU	No. 5	vs. Louisiana Tech; Compete 4 Cause Classic	W 87–61	11–0	19 – Williams	10 – F. Johnson	8 – Richard	Smoothie King Center; New Orleans, LA
December 16, 2025*; 11:00 a.m., SECN+/ESPN+	No. 5	Morgan State	W 91–33	12–0	14 – Tied	7 – Tied	4 – Fulwiley	Pete Maravich Assembly Center (8,743); Baton Rouge, LA
December 21, 2025*; 1:00 p.m., SECN	No. 5	UT Arlington	W 110–45	13–0	25 – Knox	12 – Knox	4 – F. Johnson	Pete Maravich Assembly Center (11,163); Baton Rouge, LA
December 28, 2025*; 3:00 p.m., SECN	No. 5	Alabama State	W 109–41	14–0	23 – Koval	11 – Koval	11 – Fulwiley	Pete Maravich Assembly Center (11,170); Baton Rouge, LA
SEC regular season
January 1, 2026; 7:00 p.m., SECN+/ESPN+	No. 5	No. 11 Kentucky	L 78–80	14–1 (0–1)	26 – Williams	8 – Williams	5 – Williams	Pete Maravich Assembly Center (11,435); Baton Rouge, LA
January 4, 2026; 4:00 p.m., ESPN	No. 5	at No. 12 Vanderbilt	L 61–65	14–2 (0–2)	13 – Tied	10 – Koval	6 – Tied	Memorial Gymnasium (6,576); Nashville, TN
January 8, 2026; 5:30 p.m., SECN+/ESPN+	No. 12	at Georgia	W 80–59	15–2 (1–2)	25 – F. Johnson	11 – Joyner	6 – Richard	Stegeman Coliseum (4,857); Athens, GA
January 11, 2026; 2:00 p.m., ESPN	No. 12	No. 2 Texas; We Back Pat	W 70–65	16–2 (2–2)	20 – Williams	9 – Joyner	4 – Williams	Pete Maravich Assembly Center (13,200); Baton Rouge, LA
January 18, 2026; 2:00 p.m., ESPN2	No. 6	at No. 13 Oklahoma	W 91–72	17–2 (3–2)	23 – F. Johnson	10 – F. Johnson	5 – Williams	Lloyd Noble Center (10,890); Norman, OK
January 22, 2026; 8:00 p.m., SECN	No. 6	at Texas A&M	W 98–54	18–2 (4–2)	23 – Fulwiley	11 – Joyner	9 – Williams	Reed Arena (3,771); College Station, TX
January 26, 2026; 6:00 p.m., SECN	No. 6	Florida	W 89–60	19–2 (5–2)	20 – Richard	10 – Tied	4 – Joyner	Pete Maravich Assembly Center (9,793); Baton Rouge, LA
January 29, 2026; 6:00 p.m., SECN+/ESPN+	No. 6	Arkansas; Play4Kay	W 92–70	20–2 (6–2)	17 – Tied	15 – Koval	9 – Richard	Pete Maravich Assembly Center (9,741); Baton Rouge, LA
February 1, 2026; 11:00 a.m., SECN	No. 6	No. 24 Alabama; Play4Kay	W 103–63	21–2 (7–2)	16 – Richard	10 – Z. Johnson	5 – Williams	Pete Maravich Assembly Center (12,054); Baton Rouge, LA
February 5, 2026; 8:00 p.m., ESPN	No. 5	at No. 4 Texas	L 64–77	21–3 (7–3)	20 – Williams	7 – Tied	5 – Fulwiley	Moody Center (10,406); Austin, TX
February 8, 2026; 1:00 p.m., SECN+/ESPN+	No. 5	at Auburn	W 77–44	22–3 (8–3)	16 – Z. Johnson	10 – Joyner	4 – Tied	Neville Arena (5,810); Auburn, AL
February 14, 2026; 7:30 p.m., ABC	No. 6	No. 3 South Carolina	L 72–79	22–4 (8–4)	21 – F. Johnson	13 – Joyner	3 – Tied	Pete Maravich Assembly Center (13,200); Baton Rouge, LA
February 19, 2026; 8:00 p.m., ESPN	No. 7	at No. 17 Ole Miss	W 78–70	23–4 (9–4)	26 – Fulwiley	9 – Joyner	4 – Richard	SJB Pavilion (7,424); Oxford, MS
February 22, 2026; 3:00 p.m., SECN	No. 7	Missouri	W 108–55	24–4 (10–4)	22 – Fulwiley	14 – Z. Johnson	6 – Richard	Pete Maravich Assembly Center (11,278); Baton Rouge, LA
February 26, 2026; 5:00 p.m., ESPN	No. 6	Tennessee	W 89–73	25–4 (11–4)	20 – Williams	10 – Williams	5 – Williams	Pete Maravich Assembly Center (10,877); Baton Rouge, LA
March 1, 2026; 3:00 p.m., SECN	No. 6	at Mississippi State	W 72–63	26–4 (12–4)	26 – Williams	15 – Williams	4 – Tied	Humphrey Coliseum (5,337); Starkville, MS
SEC Tournament
March 6, 2026; 1:30 p.m., ESPN	(4) No. 6	vs. (5) No. 7 Oklahoma; Quarterfinals	W 112–78	27–4	22 – Fulwiley	7 – Z. Johnson	8 – Fulwiley	Bon Secours Wellness Arena; Greenville, SC
March 7, 2026; 3:30 p.m., ESPN	(4) No. 6	vs. (1) No. 3 South Carolina; Semifinals	L 77–83	27–5	24 – Fulwiley	11 – Joyner	5 – F. Johnson	Bon Secours Wellness Arena; Greenville, SC
NCAA Tournament
March 20, 2026*; 5:00 p.m., ESPN	(2 S2) No. 5	(15 S2) Jacksonville; First Round	W 116–58	28–5	20 – F. Johnson	8 – Koval	10 – Williams	Pete Maravich Assembly Center (10,456); Baton Rouge, LA
March 22, 2026*; 2:00 p.m., ABC	(2 S2) No. 5	(7 S2) No. 25 Texas Tech; Second Round	W 101–47	29–5	24 – Tied	11 – Joyner	5 – Richard	Pete Maravich Assembly Center (11,095); Baton Rouge, LA
March 27, 2026*; 9:00 p.m., ESPN	(2 S2) No. 5	vs. (3 S2) No. 8 Duke; Sweet Sixteen	L 85–87	29–6	28 – Fulwiley	6 – Tied	4 – Fulwiley	Golden 1 Center (9,446); Sacramento, CA
*Non-conference game. ^{#}Rankings from AP Poll. (#) Tournament seedings in parentheses. S2=Sacramento 2. All times are in Central Time.

== Rankings ==
Ranking movements Legend: ██ Increase in ranking ██ Decrease in ranking
	Week																				
Poll	Pre	1	2	3	4	5	6	7	8	9	10	11	12	13	14	15	16	17	18	19	Final
AP	5	5	5	5	5	5	5	5	5*	12	6	6	6	5	6	7	6	6	5	5	
Coaches	5	5	5	5	5	5	5	5	5	12	6	6	5	5	6	7	6	6	5	5	

*AP did not release a week 8 poll.

== See also ==
- 2025–26 LSU Tigers men's basketball team
