= 2025–26 Kentucky Wildcats women's basketball team =

American college basketball season

2025–26 Kentucky Wildcats women's basketball

NCAA tournament, Sweet Sixteen
- Conference: Southeastern Conference

Ranking
- Coaches: No. 17
- AP: No. 14
- Record: 25–11 (8–8 SEC)
- Head coach: Kenny Brooks (2nd season)
- Assistant coaches: Lindsey Hicks; Radvile Autukaite; Josh Petersen
- Home arena: Memorial Coliseum

2025–26 SEC women's basketball standings
	Conf.				Overall
Team	W		L	PCT	W		L	PCT
No. 2 South Carolina	15	–	1	.938	36	–	4	.900
No. 10 Vanderbilt	13	–	3	.813	29	–	5	.853
No. 4 Texas †	13	–	3	.813	35	–	4	.897
No. 8 LSU	12	–	4	.750	29	–	6	.829
No. 12 Oklahoma	11	–	5	.688	26	–	8	.765
Tennessee	8	–	8	.500	16	–	14	.533
No. 21 Ole Miss	8	–	8	.500	24	–	12	.667
Georgia	8	–	8	.500	22	–	10	.688
No. 14 Kentucky	8	–	8	.500	25	–	11	.694
Texas A&M	7	–	9	.438	14	–	13	.519
No. 24 Alabama	7	–	9	.438	24	–	11	.686
Florida	5	–	11	.313	18	–	15	.545
Mississippi State	5	–	11	.313	18	–	13	.581
Missouri	4	–	12	.250	17	–	17	.500
Auburn	3	–	13	.188	15	–	17	.469
Arkansas	1	–	15	.063	12	–	20	.375
† 2026 SEC tournament winner Rankings from AP poll

The 2025–26 Kentucky Wildcats women's basketball team represented the University of Kentucky during the 2025–26 NCAA Division I women's basketball season. The Wildcats, led by second-year head coach Kenny Brooks, play their home games at the Memorial Coliseum and compete as members of the Southeastern Conference (SEC).

== Previous season ==
The Wildcats finished the 2024–25 season 23–8, 11–5 in SEC play to finish in a tie for fourth place. As the No. 4 seed in the SEC tournament, they lost to Oklahoma in the quarterfinals. They received an at-large bid to the NCAA tournament as the No. 4 seed Spokane 4 region. They defeated Liberty in the first round before losing to Kansas State in the second round.

== Offseason ==
=== Departures ===
Kentucky Departures
Name	Number	Pos.	Height	Year	Hometown	Reason for departure
Saniah Tyler	2	G	5'6"	Junior	Florissant, MO	Transferred to Missouri
Georgia Amoore	3	G	5'6"	Graduate student	Ballarat, Australia	Graduated/2025 WNBA draft; selected 3rd overall by Washington Mystics
Cassidy Rowe	5	G	5'5"	Junior	Virgie, KY	Left the team
Tanah Becker	8	G	6'1"	Freshman	Winnipeg, MB	Transferred to George Washington
Dazia Lawrence	10	G	5'8"	(redshirt) Senior	Greenville, NC	Graduated
Clara Silva	17	C	6'7"	Freshman	Faro, Portugal	Transferred to TCU

=== Incoming transfers ===
Kentucky incoming transfers
Name	Number	Pos.	Height	Year	Hometown	Previous school
Tonie Morgan	5	G	5'9"	Senior	Tallahassee, FL	Georgia Tech
Asia Boone	12	G	5'8"	Junior	San Diego, CA	Liberty
Josie Gilvin	33	G	6'0"	Senior	Louisville, KY	Western Kentucky

=== Recruiting classes ===
==== 2025 recruiting class ====
College recruiting
Name	Hometown	School	Height	Weight	Commit date
Kaelyn Carroll; W	Marion, MA	Tabor Academy	6 ft 2 in (1.88 m)	N/A	
Kaelyn Carroll; W	Recruit ratings: ESPN: (96)				
Overall recruit ranking:
Note: In many cases, Scout, Rivals, 247Sports, On3, and ESPN may conflict in their listings of height and weight.; In these cases, the average was taken. ESPN grades are on a 100-point scale.; Sources: "2025 Player Commits". ESPN. Archived from the original on August 8, 2025.

==== 2026 recruiting class ====
College recruiting (2026)
Name	Hometown	School	Height	Weight	Commit date
Maddyn Greenway; PG	Plymouth, MN	Providence Academy	5 ft 8 in (1.73 m)	N/A	
Maddyn Greenway; PG	Recruit ratings: ESPN: (96)				
Savvy Swords; W	Brookville, NY	Long Island Lutheran	6 ft 1 in (1.85 m)	N/A	
Savvy Swords; W	Recruit ratings: ESPN: (96)				
Overall recruit ranking:
Note: In many cases, Scout, Rivals, 247Sports, On3, and ESPN may conflict in their listings of height and weight.; In these cases, the average was taken. ESPN grades are on a 100-point scale.; Sources: "2026 Player Commits". ESPN. Archived from the original on August 8, 2025.

== Roster ==
2025–26 Kentucky Wildcats women's basketball team
Players
Coaches

Pos.	#	Name	Height	Year	Previous school	Hometown
G	0	Jordan Obi	6 ft 1 in (1.85 m)	GS	Choate Rosemary Hall; Penn	Hartford, CT
G	4	Lexi Blue	6 ft 2 in (1.88 m)	So	Lake Highland Prep	Orlando, FL
G	5	Tonie Morgan	5 ft 9 in (1.75 m)	Sr	Florida High; Georgia Tech	Tallahassee, FL
F	7	Teonni Key	6 ft 5 in (1.96 m)	Sr	Cary HS; North Carolina	Cary, NC
G	8	Asia Boone	5 ft 8 in (1.73 m)	Jr	IMG Academy; Liberty	San Diego, CA
G	11	Gabby Brooks	5 ft 10 in (1.78 m)	Jr	Blacksburg HS; Virginia Tech	Harrisonburg, VA
G	12	Dominika Paurová (injured)	6 ft 1 in (1.85 m)	RS So	DME Academy; Oregon State	Mladá Boleslav, Czech Republic
C	13	Clara Strack	6 ft 5 in (1.96 m)	Jr	Hamburg HS; Virginia Tech	Buffalo, NY
C	15	Elsa Vadfors	6 ft 5 in (1.96 m)	Fr		Hudiksvall, Sweden
F	20	Kaelyn Carroll	6 ft 3 in (1.91 m)	Fr	Tabor Academy	Dedham, MA
F	32	Amelia Hassett	6 ft 3 in (1.91 m)	Sr	Tumut HS; Eastern Florida State College	Albury, NSW, Australia
G	33	Josie Gilvin	6 ft 0 in (1.83 m)	Sr	Sacred Heart Academy; Western Kentucky	Louisville, KY

Head coach

- Kenny Brooks (James Madison)

Assistant coach(es)

- Lindsey Hicks (Purdue)
- Radvile Autukaite (Reinhardt)
- Josh Petersen (Florida State)

Legend

- (C) Team captain
- (S) Suspended
- (I) Ineligible
- (W) Walk-on
- Injured
- Current redshirt

Roster

== Schedule and results ==
Date time, TV	Rank^{#}	Opponent^{#}	Result	Record	High points	High rebounds	High assists	Site (attendance) city, state
Non-conference regular season
November 3, 2025*; 6:30 p.m., SECN+/ESPN+	No. 24т	Morehead State	W 75–59	1–0	16 – Morgan	15 – Tied	4 – Morgan	Memorial Coliseum (4,024); Lexington, KY
November 6, 2025*; 6:30 p.m., SECN+/ESPN+	No. 24т	Monmouth	W 104–49	2–0	18 – Blue	8 – Obi	9 – Morgan	Memorial Coliseum (4,096); Lexington, KY
November 9, 2025*; 2:00 p.m., ESPN+	No. 24т	at Buffalo	W 81–47	3–0	27 – Strack	12 – Tied	9 – Morgan	Alumni Arena (1,715); Amherst, NY
November 12, 2025*; 6:30 p.m., SECN+/ESPN+	No. 23	USC Upstate	W 90–30	4–0	20 – Hassett	16 – Strack	16 – Morgan	Memorial Coliseum (4,060); Lexington, KY
November 15, 2025*; 1:00 p.m., ESPN+	No. 23	at Marshall	W 76–44	5–0	17 – Obi	14 – Hassett	11 – Morgan	Cam Henderson Center (3,040); Huntington, WV
November 18, 2025*; 7:00 p.m., SECN	No. 20	Purdue	W 76–35	6–0	17 – Tied	13 – Strack	6 – Morgan	Memorial Coliseum (4,625); Lexington, KY
November 22, 2025*; 2:00 p.m., The CW	No. 20	at No. 21 Louisville; Rivalry	W 72–62	7–0	19 – Morgan	10 – Strack	7 – Morgan	KFC Yum! Center (10,442); Louisville, KY
November 26, 2025*; 5:30 p.m., FloHoops	No. 16	vs. No. 7 Maryland; Puerto Rico Shootout	L 66–74	7–1	22 – Morgan	9 – Strack	8 – Morgan	Roberto Clemente Coliseum (250); San Juan, PR
November 28, 2025*; 5:30 p.m., FloHoops	No. 16	vs. Morgan State; Puerto Rico Shootout	W 101–39	8–1	21 – Boone	7 – Hassett	8 – Morgan	Roberto Clemente Coliseum (250); San Juan, PR
December 3, 2025*; 5:00 p.m., ESPN2	No. 17	at Miami (FL); ACC–SEC Challenge	W 64–48	9–1	20 – Morgan	9 – Strack	4 – Tied	Watsco Center (859); Coral Gables, FL
December 7, 2025*; 12:00 p.m., SECN+/ESPN+	No. 17	Central Michigan	W 82–55	10–1	17 – Key	11 – Key	11 – Morgan	Memorial Coliseum (4,290); Lexington, KY
December 14, 2025*; 3:00 p.m., ESPN+	No. 15	at Belmont	W 77–69	11–1	19 – Hassett	10 – Tied	9 – Morgan	Curb Event Center (1,115); Nashville, TN
December 19, 2025*; 6:30 p.m., SECN+/ESPN+	No. 12	Wright State	W 96–53	12–1	26 – Strack	13 – Obi	6 – Morgan	Memorial Coliseum (4,188); Lexington, KY
December 28, 2025*; 2:00 p.m., SECN+/ESPN+	No. 11	Hofstra	W 80–42	13–1	24 – Strack	11 – Strack	10 – Morgan	Memorial Coliseum (4,609); Lexington, KY
SEC regular season
January 1, 2026; 8:00 p.m., SECN+/ESPN+	No. 11	at No. 5 LSU	W 80–78	14–1 (1–0)	24 – Morgan	16 – Key	12 – Morgan	Pete Maravich Assembly Center (11,485); Baton Rouge, LA
January 4, 2026; 12:00 p.m., SECN	No. 11	Missouri	W 74–52	15–1 (2–0)	19 – Strack	10 – Strack	14 – Morgan	Memorial Coliseum (4,534); Lexington, KY
January 8, 2026; 7:00 p.m., SECN	No. 6	at Alabama	L 51–64	15–2 (2–1)	14 – Morgan	13 – Strack	5 – Morgan	Coleman Coliseum (2,911); Tuscaloosa, AL
January 11, 2026; 4:00 p.m., SECN	No. 6	No. 5 Oklahoma; We Back Pat	W 63–57	16–2 (3–1)	22 – Morgan	12 – Strack	4 – Morgan	Memorial Coliseum (5,714); Lexington, KY
January 15, 2026; 7:00 p.m., SECN+/ESPN+	No. 7	Florida	W 94–89	17–2 (4–1)	26 – Morgan	8 – Hassett	13 – Morgan	Memorial Coliseum (3,368); Lexington, KY
January 18, 2026; 3:00 p.m., SECN+/ESPN+	No. 7	at Mississippi State	L 59–71	17–3 (4–2)	15 – Morgan	15 – Strack	7 – Morgan	Humphrey Coliseum (4,612); Starkville, MS
January 22, 2026; 6:30 p.m., SECN	No. 11	at No. 17 Tennessee; Rivalry	L 58–60	17–4 (4–3)	16 – Hassett	15 – Strack	4 – Morgan	Thompson–Boling Arena (12,551); Knoxville, TN
January 24, 2026; 1:00 p.m., SECN+	No. 11	Georgia	L 67–72	17–5 (4–4)	15 – Tied	9 – Obi	12 – Morgan	Memorial Coliseum (4,195); Lexington, KY
February 1, 2026; 2:00 p.m., SECN	No. 18	at Arkansas; Play4Kay	W 93–73	18–5 (5–4)	33 – Strack	15 – Strack	8 – Morgan	Bud Walton Arena (3,074); Fayetteville, AR
February 5, 2026; 7:00 p.m., SECN+/ESPN+	No. 16	No. 7 Vanderbilt	L 83–84	18–6 (5–5)	27 – Key	15 – Strack	10 – Morgan	Memorial Coliseum (5,187); Lexington, KY
February 9, 2026; 7:30 p.m., SECN	No. 18	at No. 4 Texas	L 53–64	18–7 (5–6)	16 – Boone	7 – Strack	4 – Morgan	Moody Center (9,572); Austin, TX
February 12, 2026; 6:30 p.m., SECN	No. 18	Texas A&M	W 75–55	19–7 (6–6)	19 – Tied	13 – Strack	8 – Morgan	Memorial Coliseum (4,315); Lexington, KY
February 15, 2026; 2:00 p.m., SECN	No. 18	No. 14 Ole Miss	W 74–57	20–7 (7–6)	18 – McMahon	11 – Lattimore	2 – Tied	Memorial Coliseum (5,285); Lexington, KY
February 22, 2026; 3:00 p.m., SECN+/ESPN+	No. 16	at No. 5 Vanderbilt	L 79–81	20–8 (7–7)	17 – Strack	8 – Tied	9 – Morgan	Memorial Gymnasium (6,277); Nashville, TN
February 26, 2026; 7:00 p.m., SECN+/ESPN+	No. 16	at Auburn	W 63–56	21–8 (8–7)	15 – Hassett	9 – Key	5 – Boone	Neville Arena (3,341); Auburn, AL
March 1, 2026; 2:00 p.m., SECN+/ESPN+	No. 16	No. 3 South Carolina	L 56–60	21–9 (8–8)	24 – Strack	9 – Strack	4 – Morgan	Memorial Coliseum (6,250); Lexington, KY
SEC Tournament
March 4, 2026; 11:00 a.m., SECN	(9) No. 17	vs. (16) Arkansas; First round	W 94–64	22–9	20 – Strack	13 – Strack	10 – Morgan	Bon Secours Wellness Arena (10,322); Greenville, SC
March 5, 2026; 11:00 a.m., SECN	(9) No. 17	vs. (8) No. 22 Georgia; Second round	W 76–61	23–9	33 – Strack	12 – Key	7 – Morgan	Bon Secours Wellness Arena (6,928); Greenville, SC
March 6, 2026; 12:00 p.m., ESPN	(9) No. 17	vs. (1) No. 3 South Carolina; Quarterfinals	L 64–87	23–10	15 – Hassett	8 – Key	7 – Morgan	Bon Secours Wellness Arena; Greenville, SC
NCAA Tournament
March 21, 2026*; 2:30 p.m., ESPNU	(5 FW3) No. 16	vs. (12 FW3) James Madison; First Round	W 71–56	24–10	18 – Morgan	14 – Strack	7 – Morgan	Hope Coliseum; Morgantown, WV
March 23, 2026*; 5:00 p.m., ESPN2	(5 FW3) No. 16	at (4 FW3) No. 11 West Virginia; Second Round	W 74–73	25–10	19 – Key	15 – Strack	4 – Strack	Hope Coliseum (12,830); Morgantown, WV
March 28, 2026*; 3:00 p.m., ABC	(5 FW3) No. 16	vs. (1 FW3) No. 3 Texas; Sweet Sixteen	L 54–76	25–11	16 – Strack	9 – Key	7 – Morgan	Dickies Arena (11,197); Fort Worth, TX
*Non-conference game. ^{#}Rankings from AP Poll. (#) Tournament seedings in parentheses. FW3=Fort Worth 3. All times are in Eastern Time.

== Rankings ==
Ranking movements Legend: ██ Increase in ranking ██ Decrease in ranking т = Tied with team above or below
	Week																				
Poll	Pre	1	2	3	4	5	6	7	8	9	10	11	12	13	14	15	16	17	18	19	Final
AP	24т	23	20	16	17	15	12	11	11*	6	7	11	18	16	18	16	16	17	16	16	14
Coaches	20	20	18	15	16	15	13	12	12	7	9	12	18	16	19	18	18	19	17	17	17

*AP did not release a week 8 poll.

== See also ==
- 2025–26 Kentucky Wildcats men's basketball team
