= 2026 NCAA Division I women's basketball tournament =

American college basketball tournament

- Season: 2025–26
- Teams: 68
- Finals site: Mortgage Matchup Center, Phoenix, Arizona
- Champions: UCLA Bruins (1st title, 1st title game, 2nd Final Four)
- Runner-up: South Carolina Gamecocks (5th title game, 8th Final Four)
- Semifinalists: UConn Huskies (25th Final Four); Texas Longhorns (5th Final Four)
- Winning coach: Cori Close (1st title)
- MOP: Lauren Betts (UCLA)

The 2026 NCAA Division I women's basketball tournament was a 68 team single-elimination tournament to determine the National Collegiate Athletic Association (NCAA) Division I college basketball national champion for the 2025–26 NCAA Division I women's basketball season. The 44th edition of the tournament began on March 18, 2026, with the First Four, and concluded with the championship game on April 5, at the Mortgage Matchup Center in Phoenix, Arizona. The UCLA Bruins won their first national championship in the NCAA era by defeating the South Carolina Gamecocks 79–51.

Coastal Athletic Association (CAA) champion Charleston was the only program in the field to make its NCAA tournament debut. With just one tournament debutant, the 2026 NCAA Tournament set the record for the fewest tournament debutants (the previous low was two, in the 1998 and 2017 editions).

Atlantic 10 champion Rhode Island made its second-ever appearance and its first since 1996. MAC champion Miami (OH) made its second-ever appearance and its first since 2008. American champion UTSA made its third-ever appearance and its first time since 2009. Southern champion Samford made its third-ever appearance, its first since 2012. Atlantic Sun champion Jacksonville made its third-ever appearance, its first since 2016. Ohio Valley champion Western Illinois made its third-ever appearance, its first since 2017.

The Final Four featured the same four teams as the 2025 tournament, UConn (who went in undefeated), South Carolina, Texas, and UCLA. For only the fifth time in the tournament's history, all four of the number one seeds made it to the Final Four (1989, 2012, 2015, 2018).

== Tournament procedure ==
A total of 68 teams were invited to participate in the 2026 tournament, consisting of the 31 conference champions and 37 "at-large" bids that were determined by the NCAA Selection Committee. The last four at-large teams and teams seeded 65 through 68 overall competed in First Four games, whose winners advanced to the 64-team first round.

The top 16 seeds hosted the First Four, first round, and second round at their home arenas. In a procedural change, new for this tournament, the top 16 seeds were announced in alphabetical order on Saturday, March 15, ahead of the full bracket reveal that was announced on Sunday, March 16. This was done to give host sites more time to prepare and organize the logistics required to host.

== Schedule and venues ==
First Four

- March 18 and 19
  - Moody Center, Austin, Texas (host: University of Texas at Austin)
  - Cameron Indoor Stadium, Durham, North Carolina (host: Duke University)
  - Colonial Life Arena, Columbia, South Carolina (host: University of South Carolina)
  - Carver–Hawkeye Arena, Iowa City, Iowa (host: University of Iowa)

Subregionals (first and second rounds)

- March 20 and 22 (Fri/Sun)
  - Carmichael Arena, Chapel Hill, North Carolina (host: University of North Carolina at Chapel Hill)
  - Lloyd Noble Center, Norman, Oklahoma (host: University of Oklahoma)
  - Schollmaier Arena, Fort Worth, Texas (host: Texas Christian University)
  - Williams Arena, Minneapolis, Minnesota (host: University of Minnesota)
  - Cameron Indoor Stadium, Durham, North Carolina (host: Duke University)
  - Pete Maravich Assembly Center, Baton Rouge, Louisiana (host: Louisiana State University)
  - Moody Center, Austin, Texas (host: University of Texas at Austin)
  - Crisler Center, Ann Arbor, Michigan (host: University of Michigan)
- March 21 and 23 (Sat/Mon)
  - Harry A. Gampel Pavilion, Storrs, Connecticut (host: University of Connecticut)
  - Value City Arena, Columbus, Ohio (host: Ohio State University)
  - Memorial Gymnasium, Nashville, Tennessee (host: Vanderbilt University)
  - Colonial Life Arena, Columbia, South Carolina (host: University of South Carolina)
  - Carver–Hawkeye Arena, Iowa City, Iowa (host: University of Iowa)
  - Pauley Pavilion, Los Angeles, California (host: University of California, Los Angeles)
  - Hope Coliseum, Morgantown, West Virginia (host: West Virginia University)
  - KFC Yum! Center, Louisville, Kentucky (host: University of Louisville)

Regional Semifinals and Finals (Sweet Sixteen and Elite Eight)

- March 27–30
  - Dickies Arena, Fort Worth, Texas (host: Big 12 Conference)
  - Golden 1 Center, Sacramento, California (host: California State University, Sacramento)

National Semifinals and Championship (Final Four and Championship)

- April 3 and 5
  - Mortgage Matchup Center, Phoenix, Arizona (host: Arizona State University)

Phoenix is scheduled to host the women's Final Four for the first time.

== Qualification and selection of teams ==
Teams that participated in the 2026 tournament. Fort Worth 1 Region (red), Sacramento 2 Region (orange), Fort Worth 3 Region (yellow), and Sacramento 4 Region (green).

=== Automatic qualifiers ===
Teams who won their conference championships (31) automatically qualify.

Automatic qualifiers in the 2026 NCAA Division I women's basketball tournament
Conference	Team	Appearance	Last bid
America East	Vermont	9th	2025
American	UTSA	3rd	2009
Atlantic 10	Rhode Island	2nd	1996
ACC	Duke	28th	2025
ASUN	Jacksonville	2nd	2016
Big 12	West Virginia	17th	2025
Big East	UConn	37th	2025
Big Sky	Idaho	5th	2016
Big South	High Point	3rd	2025
Big Ten	UCLA	21st	2025
Big West	UC San Diego	2nd	2025
CAA	Charleston	1st	Never
CUSA	Missouri State	18th	2022
Horizon	Green Bay	21st	2025
Ivy League	Princeton	13th	2025
MAAC	Fairfield	8th	2025
MAC	Miami (OH)	2nd	2008
MEAC	Howard	7th	2022
MVC	Murray State	3rd	2025
Mountain West	Colorado State	7th	2016
NEC	Fairleigh Dickinson	2nd	2025
Ohio Valley	Western Illinois	3rd	2017
Patriot	Holy Cross	15th	2024
SEC	Texas	38th	2025
Southern	Samford	3rd	2012
Southland	Stephen F. Austin	22nd	2025
SWAC	Southern	8th	2025
Summit	South Dakota State	14th	2025
Sun Belt	James Madison	14th	2023
WAC	California Baptist	2nd	2024
WCC	Gonzaga	16th	2024

=== Seeds ===
The tournament seeds and regions are determined through the NCAA basketball tournament selection process and will be published by the selection committee after the brackets are released in March.

Fort Worth #1 Regional – Dickies Arena, Fort Worth, TX
Seed	School	Conference	Record	Berth type	Last bid
1	UConn	Big East	34–0	Automatic	2025
2	Vanderbilt	SEC	27–4	At-large	2025
3	Ohio State	Big Ten	26–7	At-large	2025
4	North Carolina	ACC	26–7	At-large	2025
5	Maryland	Big Ten	23–8	At-large	2025
6	Notre Dame	ACC	22–10	At-large	2025
7	Illinois	Big Ten	21–11	At-large	2025
8	Iowa State	Big 12	22–9	At-large	2025
9	Syracuse	ACC	23–8	At-large	2024
10	Colorado	Big 12	22–11	At-large	2024
11	Fairfield	MAAC	28–4	Automatic	2025
12	Murray State	MVC	31–3	Automatic	2025
13	Western Illinois	OVC	26–5	Automatic	2017
14	Howard	MEAC	26–7	Automatic	2022
15	High Point	Big South	27–5	Automatic	2025
16	UTSA	American	18–15	Automatic	2009

Sacramento #4 Regional – Golden 1 Center, Sacramento, CA
Seed	School	Conference	Record	Berth type	Last bid
1	South Carolina	SEC	31–3	At-large	2025
2	Iowa	Big Ten	26–6	At-large	2025
3	TCU	Big 12	29–5	At-large	2025
4	Oklahoma	SEC	24–7	At-large	2025
5	Michigan State	Big Ten	22–8	At-large	2025
6	Washington	Big Ten	21–10	At-large	2025
7	Georgia	SEC	22–9	At-large	2023
8	Clemson	ACC	21–11	At-large	2019
9	USC	Big Ten	17–13	At-large	2025
10*	Virginia	ACC	19–11	At-large	2018
10*	Arizona State	Big 12	24–10	At-large	2019
11	South Dakota State	Summit	27–6	Automatic	2025
12	Colorado State	MWC	27–7	Automatic	2016
13	Idaho	Big Sky	29–5	Automatic	2016
14	UC San Diego	Big West	24–8	Automatic	2025
15	Fairleigh Dickinson	NEC	30–4	Automatic	2025
16*	Southern	SWAC	19–13	Automatic	2025
16*	Samford	SoCon	16–18	Automatic	2012

Sacramento #2 Regional – Golden 1 Center, Sacramento, CA
Seed	School	Conference	Record	Berth type	Last bid
1	UCLA	Big Ten	31–1	Automatic	2025
2	LSU	SEC	27–5	At-large	2025
3	Duke	ACC	26–8	Automatic	2025
4	Minnesota	Big Ten	22–8	At-large	2018
5	Ole Miss	SEC	24–12	At-large	2025
6	Baylor	Big 12	24–8	At-large	2025
7	Texas Tech	Big 12	25–7	At-large	2013
8	Oklahoma State	Big 12	23–9	At-large	2025
9	Princeton	Ivy	26–3	Automatic	2025
10	Villanova	Big East	25–7	At-large	2023
11*	Nebraska	Big Ten	18–12	At-large	2025
11*	Richmond	Atlantic 10	26–7	At-large	2025
12	Gonzaga	WCC	24–9	Automatic	2024
13	Green Bay	Horizon	25–8	Automatic	2025
14	Charleston	CAA	27–5	Automatic	Never
15	Jacksonville	ASUN	24–8	Automatic	2016
16	California Baptist	WAC	23–10	At-large	2024

Fort Worth #3 Regional – Dickies Arena, Fort Worth, TX
Seed	School	Conference	Record	Berth type	Last bid
1	Texas	SEC	31–3	Automatic	2025
2	Michigan	Big Ten	25–6	At-large	2025
3	Louisville	ACC	27–7	At-large	2025
4	West Virginia	Big 12	27–6	Automatic	2025
5	Kentucky	SEC	23–10	At-large	2025
6	Alabama	SEC	23–10	At-large	2025
7	NC State	ACC	23–10	At-large	2025
8	Oregon	Big Ten	22–12	At-large	2025
9	Virginia Tech	ACC	23–9	At-large	2024
10	Tennessee	SEC	16–13	At-large	2025
11	Rhode Island	Atlantic 10	28–4	Automatic	1996
12	James Madison	Sun Belt	26–9	Automatic	2023
13	Miami (OH)	MAC	28–5	Automatic	2008
14	Vermont	America East	27–7	Automatic	2025
15	Holy Cross	Patriot	23–10	Automatic	2024
16*	Missouri State	CUSA	22–12	Automatic	2022
16*	Stephen F. Austin	Southland	25–10	Automatic	2025

*See First Four

== Tournament bracket ==
All times are listed in Eastern Daylight Time (UTC−4). Games on ESPN ABC, ESPN2, and ESPNU are also on ESPN+.

=== First Four ===
The First Four games involve eight teams: the four lowest-seeded automatic qualifiers and the four lowest-seeded at-large teams.

March 18 – Fort Worth Regional 3 Austin, Texas
16	Missouri State	85
16	Stephen F. Austin	75

March 18 – Sacramento Regional 2 Durham, North Carolina
11	Nebraska	75
11	Richmond	56

March 19 – Sacramento Regional 4 Columbia, South Carolina
16	Samford	53
16	Southern	65

March 19 – Sacramento Regional 4 Iowa City, Iowa
10	Virginia	57
10	Arizona State	55

=== Fort Worth #1 regional – Fort Worth, Texas ===
First round Round of 64; March 20–22
1	UConn	90
16	UTSA	52
Storrs, Connecticut – Sat/Mon
8	Iowa State	63
9	Syracuse	72
5	Maryland	99
12	Murray State	67
Chapel Hill, North Carolina – Fri/Sun
4	North Carolina	83
13	Western Illinois	51
6	Notre Dame	79
11	Fairfield	60
Columbus, Ohio – Sat/Mon
3	Ohio State	75
14	Howard	54
7	Illinois	66
10	Colorado	57
Nashville, Tennessee – Sat/Mon
2	Vanderbilt	102
15	High Point	61

Second round Round of 32; March 21–23
1	UConn	98
9	Syracuse	45
5	Maryland	66
4	North Carolina	74
6	Notre Dame	83
3	Ohio State	73
7	Illinois	57
2	Vanderbilt	75

Regional semifinals Sweet 16; March 27
1	UConn	63
4	North Carolina	42
6	Notre Dame	67
2	Vanderbilt	64

Regional final Elite 8 March 29
1	UConn	70
6	Notre Dame	52

==== Fort Worth #1 regional final ====
ABC

March 29
12:00 pm CDT

No. 1 UConn Huskies 70, No. 6 Notre Dame Fighting Irish 52
Scoring by quarter: 20–11, 12–14, 15–11, 23–16
Pts: Sarah Strong (21); Rebs: Blanca Quiñónez (8); Asts: Tied (4)	Pts: Hannah Hidalgo (22); Rebs: Hannah Hidalgo (11); Asts: Hannah Hidalgo (3)

Dickies Arena – Fort Worth, TX
Attendance: 11,335
Referees: Joseph Vaszily, Karen Preato, Fatou Cissoko-Stephens

==== Fort Worth #1 regional all-tournament team ====
- Sarah Strong, UConn (MOP)
- Azzi Fudd, UConn
- Blanca Quiñónez, UConn
- Hannah Hidalgo, Notre Dame
- Aubrey Galvan, Vanderbilt

=== Sacramento #4 regional – Sacramento, California ===
First round Round of 64; March 20–22
1	South Carolina	103
16	Southern	34
Columbia, South Carolina – Sat/Mon
8	Clemson	67
9	USC	71^{OT}
5	Michigan State	65
12	Colorado State	62
Norman, Oklahoma – Fri/Sun
4	Oklahoma	89
13	Idaho	59
6	Washington	72
11	South Dakota State	54
Fort Worth, Texas – Fri/Sun
3	TCU	86
14	UC San Diego	40
7	Georgia	73
10	Virginia	82^{OT}
Iowa City, Iowa – Sat/Mon
2	Iowa	58
15	Fairleigh Dickinson	48

Second round Round of 32; March 21–23
1	South Carolina	101
9	USC	61
5	Michigan State	71
4	Oklahoma	77
6	Washington	59
3	TCU	62^{OT}
10	Virginia	83^{2OT}
2	Iowa	75

Regional semifinals Sweet 16; March 28
1	South Carolina	94
4	Oklahoma	68
3	TCU	79
10	Virginia	69

Regional final Elite 8 March 30
1	South Carolina	78
3	TCU	52

==== Sacramento #4 regional final ====
ESPN

March 30
6:00 pm PDT

No. 1 South Carolina Gamecocks 78, No. 3 TCU Horned Frogs 52
Scoring by quarter: 16–14, 19–13, 14–14, 29–11
Pts: Joyce Edwards (24); Rebs: Joyce Edwards (12); Asts: Raven Johnson (6)	Pts: Olivia Miles (18); Rebs: Tied (5); Asts: Olivia Miles (6)

Golden 1 Center – Sacramento, CA
Attendance: 8,558
Referees: Felicia Grinter, Angelica Suffren, Kyle Bacon

==== Sacramento #4 regional all-tournament team ====
- Raven Johnson, South Carolina (MOP)
- Joyce Edwards, South Carolina
- Agot Makeer, South Carolina
- Olivia Miles, TCU
- Marta Suárez, TCU

=== Sacramento #2 regional – Sacramento, California ===
First round Round of 64; March 20–22
1	UCLA	96
16	California Baptist	43
Los Angeles, California – Sat/Mon
8	Oklahoma State	82
9	Princeton	68
5	Ole Miss	81
12	Gonzaga	66
Minneapolis, Minnesota – Fri/Sun
4	Minnesota	75
13	Green Bay	58
6	Baylor	67
11	Nebraska	62
Durham, North Carolina – Fri/Sun
3	Duke	81
14	Charleston	64
7	Texas Tech	57
10	Villanova	52
Baton Rouge, Louisiana – Fri/Sun
2	LSU	116
15	Jacksonville	58

Second round Round of 32; March 21–23
1	UCLA	87
8	Oklahoma State	68
5	Ole Miss	63
4	Minnesota	65
6	Baylor	48
3	Duke	69
7	Texas Tech	47
2	LSU	101

Regional semifinals Sweet 16; March 27
1	UCLA	80
4	Minnesota	56
3	Duke	87
2	LSU	85

Regional final Elite 8 March 29
1	UCLA	70
3	Duke	58

==== Sacramento #2 regional final ====
ABC

March 29
12:00 pm PDT

No. 1 UCLA Bruins 70, No. 3 Duke Blue Devils 58
Scoring by quarter: 17–21, 14–18, 20–8, 19–11
Pts: Lauren Betts (23); Rebs: Lauren Betts (10); Asts: Charlisse Leger-Walker (6)	Pts: Taina Mair (21); Rebs: Taina Mair (7); Asts: Taina Mair (6)

Golden 1 Center – Sacramento, CA
Attendance: 9,627
Referees: Tiffany Bird, Timothy Greene, Natasha Camy

==== Sacramento #2 regional all-tournament team ====
- Lauren Betts, UCLA (MOP)
- Angela Dugalić, UCLA
- Taina Mair, Duke
- Toby Fournier, Duke
- MiLaysia Fulwiley, LSU

=== Fort Worth #3 regional – Fort Worth, Texas ===
First round Round of 64; March 20–22
1	Texas	87
16	Missouri State	45
Austin, Texas – Fri/Sun
8	Oregon	70
9	Virginia Tech	60
5	Kentucky	71
12	James Madison	56
Morgantown, West Virginia – Sat/Mon
4	West Virginia	82
13	Miami (OH)	54
6	Alabama	68
11	Rhode Island	55
Louisville, Kentucky – Sat/Mon
3	Louisville	72
14	Vermont	52
7	NC State	76
10	Tennessee	61
Ann Arbor, Michigan – Fri/Sun
2	Michigan	83
15	Holy Cross	48

Second round Round of 32; March 21–23
1	Texas	100
8	Oregon	58
5	Kentucky	74
4	West Virginia	73
6	Alabama	68
3	Louisville	69
7	NC State	63
2	Michigan	92

Regional semifinals Sweet 16; March 28
1	Texas	76
5	Kentucky	54
3	Louisville	52
2	Michigan	71

Regional final Elite 8 March 30
1	Texas	77
2	Michigan	41

==== Fort Worth #3 regional final ====
ESPN

March 30
6:00 pm CDT

No. 1 Texas Longhorns 77, No. 2 Michigan Wolverines 41
Scoring by quarter: 22–9, 12–12, 21–8, 22–12
Pts: Madison Booker (19); Rebs: Kyla Oldacre (11); Asts: Rori Harmon (13)	Pts: Tied (11); Rebs: Quarles Daniels (6); Asts: Mila Holloway (2)

Dickies Arena – Fort Worth, TX

==== Fort Worth #3 regional all-tournament team ====
- Madison Booker, Texas (MOP)
- Rori Harmon, Texas
- Jordan Lee, Texas
- Olivia Olson, Michigan
- Syla Swords, Michigan

== Final Four – Mortgage Matchup Center, Phoenix, AZ ==
During the Final Four round, regardless of the seeds of the participating teams, the champion of the top overall top seed's region (UConn, Ft. Worth #1 Region) plays against the champion of the fourth-ranked top seed's region (South Carolina, Sacramento #4 Region), and the champion of the second overall top seed's region (UCLA, Sacramento #2 Region) plays against the champion of the third-ranked top seed's region (Texas, Ft. Worth #3 Region).

National Semifinals; Final Four; Friday, April 3
S4 (1)	South Carolina	62
FW1 (1)	UConn	48
FW3 (1)	Texas	44
S2 (1)	UCLA	51

National Championship Game; Sunday, April 5
S4 (1)	South Carolina	51
S2 (1)	UCLA	79

=== Game summaries ===
==== Final Four (national semifinals) ====
ESPN

April 3
4:00 pm MST

South Carolina Gamecocks 62, UConn Huskies 48
Scoring by quarter: 15–15, 9–11, 20–13, 18–9
Pts: Ta'Niya Latson (16); Rebs: Ta'Niya Latson (11); Asts: Maddy McDaniel (3)	Pts: Sarah Strong (12); Rebs: Sarah Strong (12); Asts: Azzi Fudd (5)

Mortgage Matchup Center – Phoenix, AZ
Attendance: 15,856
Referees: Brenda Pantoja, Fatou Cissoko-Stephens, Katie Lukanich

ESPN

April 3
6:40 pm MST

Texas Longhorns 44, UCLA Bruins 51
Scoring by quarter: 6–14, 11–6, 11–11, 16–20
Pts: Kyla Oldacre (11); Rebs: Tied (7); Asts: Rori Harmon (5)	Pts: Lauren Betts (16); Rebs: Lauren Betts (11); Asts: Charlisse Leger-Walker (4)

Mortgage Matchup Center – Phoenix, AZ
Attendance: 15,856
Referees: Melissa Barlow, Felicia Grinter, Kyle Bacon

==== National championship (final) ====
ABC

April 5
12:30 pm MST

South Carolina Gamecocks 51, UCLA Bruins 79
Scoring by quarter: 10–21, 13–15, 9–25, 19–18
Pts: Tessa Johnson (14); Rebs: Joyce Edwards (11); Asts: Joyce Edwards (3)	Pts: Gabriela Jaquez (21); Rebs: Lauren Betts (11); Asts: Tied (5)

Mortgage Matchup Center – Phoenix, AZ
Attendance: 15,856
Referees: Gina Cross, Tiffany Bird

==== Final Four all-tournament team ====
- Lauren Betts, UCLA (MOP)
- Gabriela Jaquez, UCLA
- Kiki Rice, UCLA
- Tessa Johnson, South Carolina
- Ta'Niya Latson, South Carolina

== Tournament notes ==
=== Upsets ===
Per the NCAA, an upset occurs "when the losing team in an NCAA tournament game was seeded at least five seed lines better than the winning team."

The only upset in this tournament occurred when No. 2 seed Iowa lost at home to No. 10 seed Virginia in two overtimes in the round of 32.

Upsets in the 2026 NCAA Division I women's basketball tournament
Round	Fort Worth #1	Sacramento #2	Fort Worth #3	Sacramento #4
First Four	None			
Round of 64	None			
Round of 32	None			No. 10 Virginia defeated No. 2 Iowa, 83–75 ^{2OT}
Sweet 16	None			
Elite 8	None			
Final 4	None			
National Championship	None			

== Game officials ==
=== First Four ===
- Cara Seggie, Timothy Bryant, Doug Knight
- Eric Koch, Kylie Galloway, Nicole Brannon
- Cameron Inouye, Brian Woods, Alecia Ann Murray

=== First and second rounds ===
- Joseph Vaszily, Lorena Ahumada, Talisa Green
- Angie Enlund, Kevin Pethtel, Kenya Kirkland
- Kyle Bacon, Toni Patillo, Demoya Pugh
- Tim Daley, Scott Berkins, Ashley Olsen
- Felicia Grinter, Marla Gearhart, Jody Cantrell
- Eric Brewton, Teresa Turner, Felicity Willis
- Bruce Morris, Angelica Suffren, Angel Kent
- Darren Krzesnik, Marc Merritt, Katie Lukanich
- Ify Seales, In'Fini Robinson, Tashianna Smith
- Maj Forsberg, Bill Larance, Lee Mullen
- Chuck Gonzalez, Nykesha Thompson, Lauren Niemiera
- Kevin Sparrock, Brian Hall, Kelly Broomfield
- Michol Murray, Zac Brost, Kimberly Hobbes
- Eric Koch, Jamie Broderick, Saif Esho
- Billy Smith, Kristen Bell, Scott Osborne
- Kelsey Reynolds, Mark Resch, Ashlee Goode

=== National semifinals and final (Final Four and National Championship) ===
- Brenda Pantoja, Fatou Cissoko-Stephens, Katie Lukanich
- Melissa Barlow, Felicia Grinter, Kyle Bacon
- Gina Cross, Tiffany Bird

== Record by conference ==
Conference	Bids	Record	Win %	FF	R64	R32	S16	E8	F4	CG	NC
Big Ten	12	20–11	.645	1	12	11	3	2	1	1	1
SEC	10	19–10	.655	–	10	8	6	2	2	1	–
Big East	2	4–2	.667	–	2	1	1	1	1	–	–
ACC	9	15–9	.625	1	9	7	5	2	–	–	–
Big 12	8	7–8	.467	1	7	5	1	1	–	–	–
ASUN	1	0–1	.000	–	1	–	–	–	–	–	–
America East	1	0–1	.000	–	1	–	–	–	–	–	–
American	1	0–1	.000	–	1	–	–	–	–	–	–
Atlantic 10	2	0–2	.000	1	1	–	–	–	–	–	–
Big Sky	1	0–1	.000	–	1	–	–	–	–	–	–
Big South	1	0–1	.000	–	1	–	–	–	–	–	–
Big West	1	0–1	.000	–	1	–	–	–	–	–	–
CAA	1	0–1	.000	–	1	–	–	–	–	–	–
CUSA	1	1–1	.500	1	1	–	–	–	–	–	–
Horizon	1	0–1	.000	–	1	–	–	–	–	–	–
Horizon	1	0–1	.000	–	1	–	–	–	–	–	–
MAAC	1	0–1	.000	–	1	–	–	–	–	–	–
MAC	1	0–1	.000	–	1	–	–	–	–	–	–
MEAC	1	0–1	.000	–	1	–	–	–	–	–	–
MVC	1	0–1	.000	–	1	–	–	–	–	–	–
Mountain West	1	0–1	.000	–	1	–	–	–	–	–	–
NEC	1	0–1	.000	–	1	–	–	–	–	–	–
OVC	1	0–1	.000	–	1	–	–	–	–	–	–
SWAC	1	1–1	.500	1	1	–	–	–	–	–	–
Summit	1	0–1	.000	–	1	–	–	–	–	–	–
Sun Belt	1	0–1	.000	–	1	–	–	–	–	–	
WCC	1	0–1	.000	–	1	–	–	–	–	–	–
WAC	1	0–1	.000	–	1	–	–	–	–	–	–
Southern	1	0–1	.000	1	–	–	–	–	–	–	–
Southland	1	0–1	.000	1	–	–	–	–	–	–	

- The R64, R32, S16, E8, F4, CG, and NC columns indicate how many teams from each conference were in the round of 64 (second round), round of 32 (third round), Sweet 16 and Elite Eight (regional semifinals and finals), Final Four and championship game (national semifinal and final), and national champion, respectively.
- The "Record" column includes wins in the first round (First Four) for Nebraska (Big Ten), Virginia (ACC), Southern (SWAC), and Missouri State (C-USA).
- The "Record" column also includes losses in the first round (First Four) for Richmond (A-10), Arizona State (Big 12), Stephen F. Austin (Southland), and Samford (SoCon).

== Media coverage ==
=== Television ===
ESPN had the rights to broadcast each of the games for this tournament across ESPN, ESPN2, ESPNU, ESPNEWS, and ABC. Also for the fourth consecutive season, the national championship game aired on ABC.

==== Studio hosts and analysts ====
- Christine Williamson (host) (first four, first/second rounds, regionals, Final Four, and national championship game)
- Kelsey Riggs Cuff (host) (first round and regionals)
- Taylor Tannebaum (host) (first/second rounds)
- Andraya Carter (analyst) (first four, first/second rounds, regionals, Final Four and national championship game)
- Chiney Ogwumike (analyst) (first/second rounds, regionals, Final Four and national championship)
- Muffet McGraw (analyst) (first/second rounds and regionals)
- Meghan McKeown (analyst) (first/second rounds and regionals)
- Dee Kantner (rules analyst) (first four, first/second rounds, regionals, Final Four, and national championship game)
- Violet Palmer (rules analyst) (first four, first/second rounds, and regionals)

==== Commentary teams ====
First Four

- Dave O'Brien and Jimmy Dykes – Austin, Texas
- Jenn Hildreth and Kelly Gramlich – Durham, North Carolina
- Matt Schick and Steffi Sorensen – Columbia, South Carolina (Courtney Lyle was scheduled for this game)
- Matt Schumacker and Ros Gold-Onwude – Iowa City, Iowa

first & second rounds; Friday-Sunday (Subregionals)

- Mark Neely and Angel Gray – Chapel Hill, North Carolina
- Sam Gore and Tamika Catchings – Norman, Oklahoma
- Chuckie Kempf and Brooke Weisbrod – Fort Worth, Texas
- Krista Blunk and Andrea Lloyd-Curry – Minneapolis, Minnesota
- Jenn Hildreth and Kelly Gramlich – Durham, North Carolina
- Tiffany Greene, Carolyn Peck, and Alyssa Lang – Baton Rouge, Louisiana
- Dave O'Brien and Jimmy Dykes – Austin, Texas
- Beth Mowins, Debbie Antonelli, and Jess Sims – Ann Arbor, Michigan

first & second rounds Saturday/Monday (Subregionals)

- Ryan Ruocco, Rebecca Lobo, and Holly Rowe – Storrs, Connecticut
- Roy Philpott and Nell Fortner – Columbus, Ohio
- Jay Alter and Kim Adams – Nashville, Tennessee
- Mike Monaco, Stephanie White and Molly McGrath – Columbia, South Carolina (Courtney Lyle was scheduled for these games)
- Matt Schumacker and Ros Gold-Onwude – Iowa City, Iowa
- Eric Frede and Christy Thomaskutty – Los Angeles, California (UCLA)
- Brenda VanLengen and Anne O’Neil – Morgantown, West Virginia
- Wes Durham and Angela Taylor – Louisville, Kentucky

regional semifinals and final (Sweet 16 and Elite Eight)

- Tiffany Greene, Carolyn Peck, and Angel Gray – Fort Worth, Texas (Regional 1 – Sweet 16 games only)
- Courtney Lyle, Stephanie White, and Kris Budden – Sacramento, California (Regional 4)
- Beth Mowins, Debbie Antonelli, and Jess Sims – Sacramento, California (Regional 2)
- Ryan Ruocco, Rebecca Lobo, and Holly Rowe – Fort Worth, Texas (Regional 3 – Sweet 16/Regionals 1 & 3 – Elite Eight)

National semifinals and finals (Final Four and National Championship)

- Ryan Ruocco, Rebecca Lobo, and Holly Rowe – Phoenix, Arizona

=== Radio ===
Westwood One served as the radio broadcaster for the tournament.

regional semifinals and final (Sweet 16 and Elite Eight)

- Nate Gatter and Kim Adams – Fort Worth, Texas 1
- Sam Neidermann and Debbie Antonelli – Sacramento, California 4
- Lance Medow and Mary Murphy – Sacramento, California 2
- Danny Reed and Isis Young – Fort Worth, Texas 3

national semifinal and finals (Final Four and National Championship Game)

- Ryan Radtke, Debbie Antonelli, and Ros Gold-Onwude – Phoenix, Arizona

== See also ==
- 2026 NCAA Division I men's basketball tournament
- 2026 NCAA Division II women's basketball tournament
- 2026 NCAA Division III women's basketball tournament
- 2026 NAIA women's basketball tournament
- 2026 Women's Basketball Invitation Tournament
- 2026 Women's National Invitation Tournament
