= 2026 SWAC women's basketball tournament =

American collegiate Tournament

- Conference logo
- Classification: Division I
- Season: 2025–26
- Teams: 10
- Site: Gateway Center Arena; College Park, Georgia
- Champions: Southern (8th title)
- Winning coach: Carlos Funchess (3rd title)
- Television: ESPN+ and ESPNU

2025–26 SWAC women's basketball standings
	Conf.				Overall
Team	W		L	PCT	W		L	PCT
Alabama A&M	17	–	1	.944	22	–	11	.667
Alcorn State	14	–	4	.778	17	–	14	.548
Alabama State	12	–	6	.667	17	–	15	.531
Southern †	12	–	6	.667	20	–	14	.588
Jackson State	10	–	8	.556	12	–	19	.387
Grambling State	10	–	8	.556	13	–	19	.406
Arkansas–Pine Bluff	10	–	8	.556	15	–	16	.484
Florida A&M	7	–	11	.389	9	–	22	.290
Mississippi Valley State	6	–	12	.333	8	–	23	.258
Texas Southern	6	–	12	.333	10	–	21	.323
Bethune–Cookman	4	–	14	.222	7	–	26	.212
Prairie View A&M	0	–	18	.000	2	–	28	.067
† 2026 SWAC tournament winner

The 2026 SWAC Women's Basketball Tournament was the postseason women's basketball tournament for the 2025–26 season in the Southwestern Athletic Conference (SWAC). The tournament will be held from March 9–14, 2026 at Gateway Center Arena in College Park, Georgia. The tournament winner, Southern received an automatic invitation to the 2026 NCAA Division I Women's Basketball Tournament. The tournament was sponsored by Pepsi.

== Seeds ==
Teams were seeded by record within the conference, with a tie–breaker system to seed teams with identical conference records. All 12 schools participated in the tournament, raising the number from 10 and eight in previous seasons.

Seed	School	Conference	Tiebreaker
1	Alabama A&M	17–1	
2	Alcorn State	14–4	
3	Alabama State	12–6	1–0 vs. Southern
4	Southern	12–6	
5	Jackson State	10–8	1–0 vs. Grambling State, 1–1 vs. UAPB
6	Grambling State	10–8	1–0 vs. UAPB
7	Arkansas–Pine Bluff	10–8	0–1 vs Grambling State
8	Florida A&M	7–11	
9	Mississippi Valley State	6–12	1–1 +4 scoring margin vs. Texas Southern
10	Texas Southern	6–12	
11	Bethune–Cookman	4–14	
12	Prairie View A&M	0–18	

== Schedule ==
Game	Time*	Matchup^{#}	Score	Television
First round – Monday, March 9
1	11:00 a.m.	No. 10 Texas Southern vs. No. 11 Bethune–Cookman	62–66	ESPN+
2	5:30 p.m.	No. 9 Mississippi Valley State vs. No. 12 Prairie View A&M	63–49	ESPN+
Second round – Tuesday, March 10
3	11:00 a.m.	No. 8 Florida A&M vs. No. 11 Bethune–Cookman	55–52	ESPN+
4	5:30 p.m.	No. 7 Arkansas–Pine Bluff vs. No. 9 Mississippi Valley State	81–74	ESPN+
Quarterfinals – Wednesday, March 11
5	11:00 a.m.	No. 1 Alabama A&M vs. No. 8 Florida A&M	72–68	ESPN+
6	5:30 p.m.	No. 2 Alcorn State vs. No. 7 Arkansas–Pine Bluff	60–64	ESPN+
Quarterfinals – Thursday, March 12
7	11:00 a.m.	No. 4 Southern vs. No. 5 Jackson State	64–51	ESPN+
8	5:30 p.m.	No. 3 Alabama State vs. No. 6 Grambling State	56–50	ESPN+
Semifinals – Friday, March 13
9	11:00 a.m.	No. 1 Alabama A&M vs. No. 4 Southern	49–51	ESPN+
10	5:30 p.m.	No. 3 Alabama State vs. No. 7 Arkansas–Pine Bluff	72–59	ESPN+
Championship – Saturday, March 14
11	1:00 p.m.	No. 3 Alabama State vs. No. 4 Southern	56–73	ESPNU

== Bracket ==
First round March 9, 2026; ESPN+
10	Texas Southern	62
11	Bethune–Cookman	66
9	Mississippi Valley State	63
12	Prairie View A&M	49

Second round March 10, 2026; ESPN+
8	Florida A&M	55
11	Bethune–Cookman	52
7	Arkansas–Pine Bluff	81
9	Mississippi Valley State	74

Quarterfinals; March 11–12, 2026; ESPN+
1	Alabama A&M	72
8	Florida A&M	68
4	Southern	64
5	Jackson State	51
2	Alcorn State	60
7	Arkansas–Pine Bluff	64
3	Alabama State	56
6	Grambling State	50

Semifinals; March 13, 2026; ESPN+
1	Alabama A&M	49
4	Southern	51
7	Arkansas–Pine Bluff	59
3	Alabama State	72

Championship; March 14, 2026; ESPNU
4	Southern	73
3	Alabama State	56
