= Stephanie Okechukwu =

Nigerian basketball player (born 2005)

No. 24 – Texas Tech Lady Raiders
- Position: Center
- League: Big 12 Conference

Personal information
- Born: 17 February 2005 (age 21)
- Listed height: 216 cm (7 ft 1 in)

Career information
- High school: Fukuchiyama Seibi (Kyoto, Japan)
- College: Texas Tech

Stephanie Okechukwu is a Nigerian basketball player. In 2026 Texas Tech added her to the roster of the women's team as a mid-season addition. Originally from Umunneochi, Nigeria, when she signed with the team she was the tallest female basketball player in the history of the NCAA at seven feet one inch tall.

Okechukwu speaks three languages: English, Igbo and Japanese.
