= Foster Pavilion =

Arena in Texas, United States

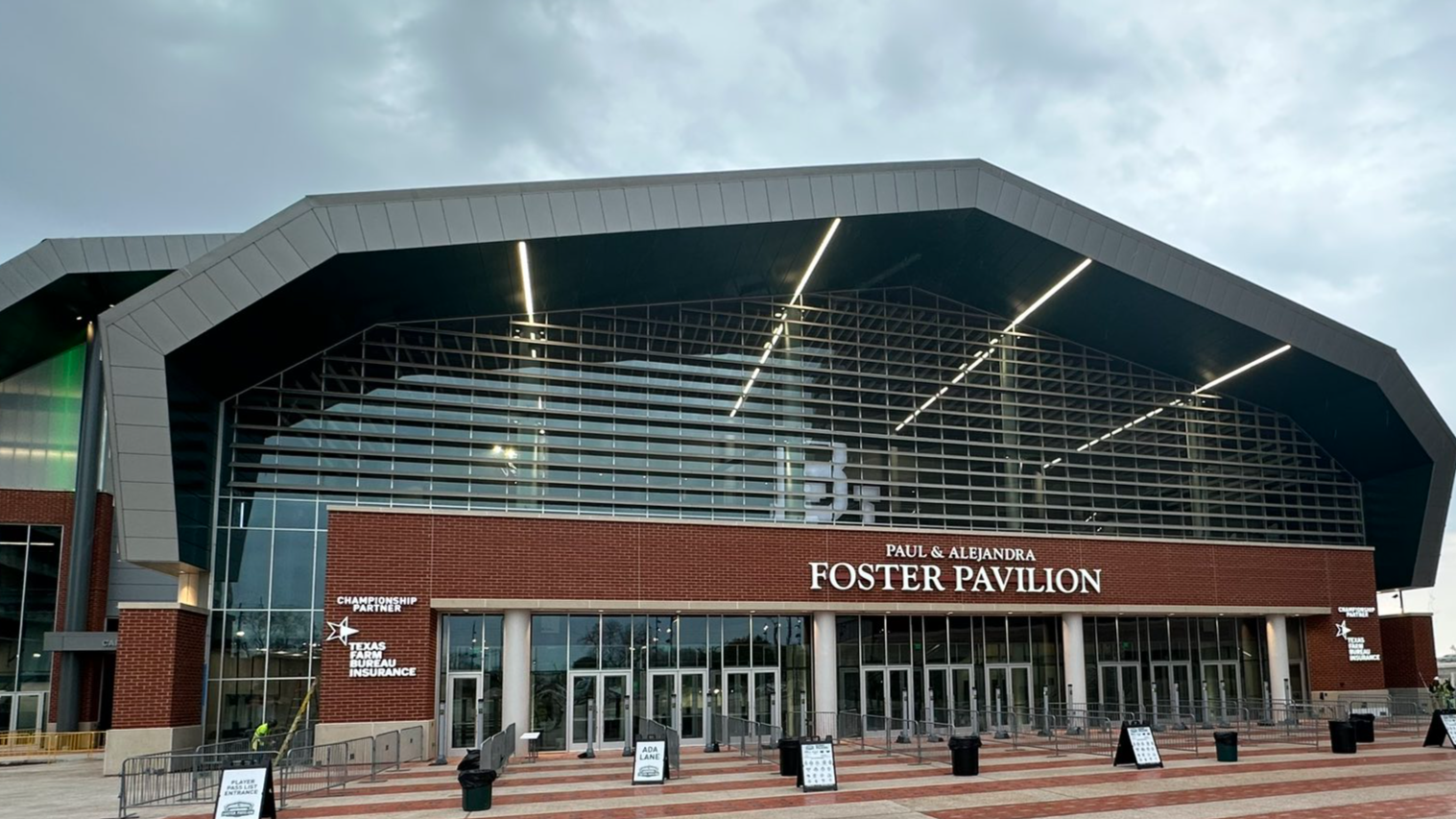
- Interactive map of Foster Pavilion
- Full name: Paul and Alejandra Foster Pavilion
- Location: Waco, Texas
- Coordinates: 31°33.4019′N 97°07.2968′W
- Owner: Baylor University
- Operator: Baylor University
- Capacity: 7,500

Construction
- Groundbreaking: June 2022
- Opened: January 2, 2024
- Cost: $212.6 million

Tenants
- Baylor Bears (men's & women's basketball)

Foster Pavilion is a multi-purpose arena on the campus of Baylor University in Waco, Texas. Completed in 2024, the arena hosts the Baylor Bears men's and women's basketball teams. The arena replaced the Ferrell Center for both basketball teams, while the Ferrell Center will be renovated as a home for volleyball and acrobatics and tumbling teams.

== History ==
The arena was first announced in 2019, as a basketball-only facility, with a lead funding gift from an anonymous donor of $100 million. In November 2021, the anonymous donors were revealed as Paul L. Foster and his wife Alejandra, and it was announced that the arena would be named the Foster Pavilion in their honor. The following month, it was announced that the arena would be built as part of a new, $700 million multi-use development along the Brazos River in downtown Waco, across Interstate 35 from the University's campus. Alongside this, it was announced that the City of Waco would provide an additional $65 million in funding, which would be used to add elements to the arena to allow its use as a city-run concert venue 90 days per year. But in March 2022 that changed, with the city council revising down its arena contribution to $34 million while also approving spending of $34.1 million on a nearby parking garage, river walk reconstruction and road improvements, parking and pedestrian planning; with an additional $4.9 million to a private riverfront developer that was approved at the time, the total city contribution was expected to be $73 million to transform the surrounding area. The 90-day agreement was also revised down to allow for the city to hold events at the pavilion on 25 days each year, plus 10 city-booked ticketed performances in the first two years of the arena, and an additional 10 Baylor events annually.

The arena was opened on January 2, 2024, with a men's basketball game against Cornell, which Baylor won 98–79. The women's team played its first game in the arena the following day against conference rival TCU, a 71–50 Baylor victory.
