= 2024–25 Texas Tech Lady Raiders basketball team =

Intercollegiate basketball season team

2024–25 Texas Tech Lady Raiders basketball

WBIT, Quarterfinal
- Conference: Big 12 Conference
- Record: 19–18 (4–14 Big 12)
- Head coach: Krista Gerlich (5th season)
- Assistant coaches: Ashley Odom; Plenette Pierson; Erik DeRoo; Jordan Vessels; Mitch Vanya
- Home arena: United Supermarkets Arena

2024–25 Big 12 Conference women's basketball standings
	Conf.				Overall
Team	W		L	PCT	W		L	PCT
No. 6 TCU †	16	–	2	.889	34	–	4	.895
No. 14 Baylor	15	–	3	.833	28	–	8	.778
No. 17 Oklahoma State	14	–	4	.778	25	–	7	.781
No. 16 West Virginia	13	–	5	.722	25	–	8	.758
No. 19 Kansas State	13	–	5	.722	28	–	8	.778
Utah	13	–	5	.722	22	–	9	.710
Iowa State	12	–	6	.667	23	–	12	.657
Arizona	10	–	8	.556	19	–	14	.576
Colorado	9	–	9	.500	21	–	13	.618
Cincinnati	7	–	11	.389	15	–	14	.517
Kansas	6	–	12	.333	16	–	14	.533
BYU	4	–	14	.222	13	–	17	.433
UCF	4	–	14	.222	12	–	18	.400
Texas Tech	4	–	14	.222	19	–	18	.514
Arizona State	3	–	15	.167	10	–	22	.313
Houston	1	–	17	.056	5	–	25	.167
† 2025 Big 12 tournament winner Rankings from AP poll

The 2024–25 Texas Tech Lady Raiders basketball team represent Texas Tech University for the 2024–25 NCAA Division I women's basketball season. The Lady Raiders, were led by fifth-year head coach Krista Gerlich and played their home games at the United Supermarkets Arena as members of the Big 12 Conference.

== Previous season ==
The Lady Raiders finished the season 17–16, 5–13 in Big 12 play to finish tied for eleventh place. As the 12-seed, they beat 13-seed Houston in the Big 12 Tournament. They lost in the second round to 5-seed Baylor. They were not invited to a postseason tournament, ending their season with the Big 12 Tournament.

== Offseason ==
=== Departures ===
Texas Tech Departures
Name	Number	Pos.	Height	Year	Hometown	Reason for Departure
Jazion Jackson	1	G	5'9"	Senior	Dallas, TX	Transferred to Arizona State
JoJo Nworie	4	F/C	6'5"	Sophomore	Lagos, Nigeria	Transferred to Colorado
Rhyle McKinney	5	G	5'9"	Junior	Argyle, TX	Graduated
Saga Ukkonen	11	G	5'9"	Junior	Helsinki, Finland	Transferred to Fresno State
Elina Arike	13	F	6'2"	Senior	Helsinki, Finland	Transferred to Middle Tennessee
Ashley Chevalier	25	G	5'7"	Junior	Chatsworth, CA	Transferred to Houston
Jazmaine Lewis	42	C	6'4"	Senior	Kansas City, MO	Graduated

=== Incoming ===
Texas Tech incoming transfers
Name	Num	Pos.	Height	Year	Hometown	Previous School
Jalynn Bristow	1	G/F	6'2"	Sophomore	Holliday, TX	Iowa State
Denae Fritz	5	G	5'11"	Graduate	Maryville, TN	Baylor
Adlee Blacklock	8	G	6'0"	Junior	Lubbock, TX	Oregon State
Sarengbe Sanogo	11	F/C	6'3"	Junior	Paris, France	Odessa College
Ivana Krajina	13	G	5'11"	Junior	Kaštel Novi, Croatia	Odessa College
Maya Peat	54	C	6'6"	Graduate	Chandler, AZ	Arkansas-Pine Bluff

==== Recruiting ====
College recruiting
Name	Hometown	School	Height	Weight	Commit date
Kalysta Martin; G	San Antonio, TX	Providence Catholic School	6 ft 1 in (1.85 m)	N/A	June 30, 2023
Kalysta Martin; G	Recruit ratings: ESPN: (93)				
Overall recruit ranking:
Note: In many cases, Scout, Rivals, 247Sports, On3, and ESPN may conflict in their listings of height and weight.; In these cases, the average was taken. ESPN grades are on a 100-point scale.; Sources: "2024 Player Commits". ESPN. Archived from the original on November 4, 2024.

==== Recruiting class of 2024 ====
College recruiting (2025)
Name	Hometown	School	Height	Weight	Commit date
			N/A	N/A	
Recruit ratings: No ratings found
Overall recruit ranking:
Note: In many cases, Scout, Rivals, 247Sports, On3, and ESPN may conflict in their listings of height and weight.; In these cases, the average was taken. ESPN grades are on a 100-point scale.; Sources: "2025 Player Commits". ESPN. Archived from the original on November 4, 2024.

== Roster ==
2024–25 Texas Tech Lady Raiders women's basketball team
Players
Coaches

Pos.	#	Name	Height	Year	Previous school	Hometown
G/F	1	Jalynn Bristow	6 ft 2 in (1.88 m)	So	Holliday HS; Iowa State	Holliday, TX
G/F	2	Kilah Freelon	6 ft 1 in (1.85 m)	Jr	Mullen HS	Denver, CO
G	3	Jasmine Shavers	5 ft 8 in (1.73 m)	RS Jr	Dr. John Horn HS; Mississippi State	Mesquite, TX
G	5	Denae Fritz	5 ft 11 in (1.8 m)	RS Jr	Maryville HS; Baylor	Maryville, TN
G	7	Bird Martin	6 ft 2 in (1.88 m)	Fr	Providence Catholic School	San Antonio, TX
G	8	Adlee Blacklock	6 ft 0 in (1.83 m)	Jr	Lubbock-Cooper HS; Oregon State	Lubbock, TX
C	10	Achol Magot	6 ft 7 in (2.01 m)	So	Southern Arizona Volunteers Prep	Tucson, AZ
F/C	11	Sarengbe Sanogo	6 ft 3 in (1.91 m)	Jr	Northwest Kansas Technical College; Odessa College	Paris, France
G/F	12	Jordyn Merritt	6 ft 3 in (1.91 m)	GS	Plano HS; Florida	Plano, TX
G	13	Ivana Krajina	5 ft 11 in (1.8 m)	Jr	Odessa College	Kaštel Novi, Croatia
G	20	Bailey Maupin	5 ft 10 in (1.78 m)	Jr	Gruver HS	Gruver, TX
G	23	Loghan Johnson	5 ft 10 in (1.78 m)	So	Houston Christian HS	Houston, TX
G	24	Jada Wynn	6 ft 1 in (1.85 m)	Jr	Troy HS; Colorado	Yorba Linda, CA
G	30	Kelly Mora	6 ft 1 in (1.85 m)	So	Monterey HS	Lubbock, TX
C	54	Maya Peat	6 ft 6 in (1.98 m)	GS	Chandler HS; Arkansas–Pine Bluff	Chandler, AZ

Head coach

- Krista Gerlich (Texas Tech)

Assistant coach(es)

- Ashley Odom (Lamar)
- Plenette Pierson (Texas Tech)
- Erik Deroo (Fresno State)
- Jordan Vessels (West Texas A&M)
- Mitch Vanya (Texas A&M)

Legend

- (C) Team captain
- (S) Suspended
- (I) Ineligible
- (W) Walk-on
- Injured
- Current redshirt

Roster

== Schedule and results ==
Date time, TV	Rank^{#}	Opponent^{#}	Result	Record	Site (attendance) city, state
Non-conference regular season
November 4, 2024*; 6:00 p.m., ESPN+		Incarnate Word	W 78–48	1–0	United Supermarkets Arena (3,584); Lubbock, TX
November 7, 2024*; 6:00 p.m., ESPN+		Houston Christian	W 63–40	2–0	United Supermarkets Arena (4,609); Lubbock, TX
November 12, 2024*; 6:00 p.m., ESPN+		New Mexico	W 75–68	3–0	United Supermarkets Arena (3,690); Lubbock, TX
November 16, 2024*; 6:00 p.m., ESPN+		Washington State	W 56–52	4–0	United Supermarkets Arena (4,467); Lubbock, TX
November 19, 2024*; 6:00 p.m., ESPN+		Abilene Christian	W 66–40	5–0	United Supermarkets Arena (3,907); Lubbock, TX
November 23, 2024*; 2:00 p.m., ESPN+		New Orleans	W 78–70	6–0	United Supermarkets Arena (4,130); Lubbock, TX
November 28, 2024*; 7:00 p.m., ESPN+		vs. Florida State; Paradise Jam Tournament	L 62–70	6–1	Elridge Blake Sports and Fitness Center (1,825); Saint Thomas, USVI
November 29, 2024*; 7:00 p.m., ESPN+		vs. Gonzaga; Paradise Jam Tournament	W 67–49	7–1	Elridge Blake Sports and Fitness Center (1,725); Saint Thomas, USVI
November 30, 2024*; 4:30 p.m., TBA		vs. Missouri State; Paradise Jam Tournament	W 72–69	8–1	Elridge Blake Sports and Fitness Center; Saint Thomas, USVI
December 3, 2024*; 6:00 p.m., ESPN+		Stephen F. Austin	W 78–68	9–1	United Supermarkets Arena (4,231); Lubbock, TX
December 11, 2024*; 7:00 p.m., ACCN		at SMU	L 57–61	9–2	Moody Coliseum (1,834); University Park, TX
December 15, 2024*; 2:00 p.m., SECN		at Arkansas	W 75–72	10–2	Bud Walton Arena (2,511); Fayetteville, AR
December 17, 2024*; 11:30 a.m., ESPN+		Lamar	W 73–67	11–2	United Supermarkets Arena (13,106); Lubbock, TX
Big 12 Conference regular season
December 22, 2024; 2:00 p.m., ESPN+		Houston	W 74–59	12–2 (1–0)	United Supermarkets Arena (4,227); Lubbock, TX
January 1, 2025; 5:00 p.m., ESPN+		at Arizona State	L 61–79	12–3 (1–1)	Desert Financial Arena (1,277); Tempe, AZ
January 4, 2025; 4:00 p.m., ESPN+		at No. 12 Kansas State	L 57–77	12–4 (1–2)	Bramlage Coliseum (6,042); Manhattan, KS
January 8, 2025; 6:00 p.m., ESPN+		No. 17 West Virginia	L 53–89	12–5 (1–3)	United Supermarkets Arena (4,222); Lubbock, TX
January 11, 2025; 6:00 p.m., ESPN+		No. 11 TCU	L 43–69	12–6 (1–4)	United Supermarkets Arena (5,465); Lubbock, TX
January 14, 2025; 6:30 p.m., ESPN+		at Iowa State	L 58–71	12–7 (1–5)	Hilton Coliseum (9,137); Ames, IA
January 18, 2025; 7:00 p.m., ESPN+		BYU	W 70–65	13–7 (2–5)	United Supermarkets Arena (4,008); Lubbock, TX
January 22, 2025; 1:00 p.m., ESPN+		at Houston	W 62–44	14–7 (3–5)	Fertitta Center (611); Houston, TX
January 25, 2025; 2:00 p.m., ESPN+		Oklahoma State	L 68–71	14–8 (3–6)	United Supermarkets Arena (4,468); Lubbock, TX
January 29, 2025; 6:30 p.m., ESPN+		at Kansas	L 50–57	14–9 (3–7)	Allen Fieldhouse (3,076); Lawrence, KS
February 2, 2025; 3:00 p.m., ESPNU		at Colorado	L 51–67	14–10 (3–8)	CU Events Center (4,953); Boulder, CO
February 5, 2025; 6:00 p.m., ESPN+		Utah	L 64–70	14–11 (3–9)	United Supermarkets Arena (3,986); Lubbock, TX
February 8, 2025; 4:00 p.m., ESPN+		at No. 9 TCU	L 42–63	14–12 (3–10)	Schollmaier Arena (5,478); Fort Worth, TX
February 15, 2025; 2:00 p.m., ESPN+		No. 25 Baylor	L 60–66	14–13 (3–11)	United Supermarkets Arena (4,648); Lubbock, TX
February 19, 2025; 6:00 p.m., ESPN+		Cincinnati	L 56–59	14–14 (3–12)	United Supermarkets Arena (3,920); Lubbock, TX
February 22, 2025; 1:00 p.m., ESPN+		at UCF	L 60–61	14–15 (3–13)	Addition Financial Arena (1,207); Orlando, FL
February 25, 2025; 7:00 p.m., TBA		at Arizona	L 57–66	14–16 (3–14)	McKale Center (6,911); Tucson, AZ
March 1, 2025; 2:00 p.m., ESPN+		Colorado	W 83–79 ^{OT}	15–16 (4–14)	United Supermarkets Arena (5,452); Lubbock, TX
Big 12 Conference Tournament
March 5, 2025; 8:00 p.m., ESPN+	(14)	vs. (11) Kansas; First Round	W 57–53	16–16	T-Mobile Center (4,374); Kansas City, MO
March 6, 2025; 8:00 p.m., ESPN+	(14)	vs. (6) Utah; Second Round	W 75–64	17–16	T-Mobile Center (4,582); Kansas City, MO
March 7, 2025; 8:00 p.m., ESPN+	(14)	vs. (3) No. 21 Oklahoma State; Quarterfinals	L 59–62	17–17	T-Mobile Center (5,681); Kansas City, MO
WBIT
March 20, 2025; 7:30 p.m., ESPN+		(4) Wyoming; First Round	W 65–48	18–17	Arena-Auditorium (2,409); Laramie, WY
March 23, 2025; 3:00 p.m., ESPN+		(1) Virginia Tech; Second Round	W 69–59	19–17	Cassell Coliseum (2,664); Blacksburg, VA
March 27, 2025; 5:00 p.m., ESPN+		(3) Florida; Quarterfinal	L 63–67	19–18	O'Connell Center (501); Gainesville, FL
*Non-conference game. ^{#}Rankings from AP Poll. (#) Tournament seedings in parentheses. All times are in Central Time.

== See also ==
- 2024–25 Texas Tech Red Raiders basketball team
