= 2024–25 UCF Knights women's basketball team =

Intercollegiate sports season

2024–25 UCF Knights women's basketball
- Conference: Big 12 Conference
- Record: 12–18 (4–14 Big 12)
- Head coach: Sytia Messer (3rd season)
- Assistant coaches: Mike Carey; Walter Pitts; Rekha Patterson
- Home arena: Addition Financial Arena

2024–25 Big 12 Conference women's basketball standings
	Conf.				Overall
Team	W		L	PCT	W		L	PCT
No. 6 TCU †	16	–	2	.889	34	–	4	.895
No. 14 Baylor	15	–	3	.833	28	–	8	.778
No. 17 Oklahoma State	14	–	4	.778	25	–	7	.781
No. 16 West Virginia	13	–	5	.722	25	–	8	.758
No. 19 Kansas State	13	–	5	.722	28	–	8	.778
Utah	13	–	5	.722	22	–	9	.710
Iowa State	12	–	6	.667	23	–	12	.657
Arizona	10	–	8	.556	19	–	14	.576
Colorado	9	–	9	.500	21	–	13	.618
Cincinnati	7	–	11	.389	15	–	14	.517
Kansas	6	–	12	.333	16	–	14	.533
BYU	4	–	14	.222	13	–	17	.433
UCF	4	–	14	.222	12	–	18	.400
Texas Tech	4	–	14	.222	19	–	18	.514
Arizona State	3	–	15	.167	10	–	22	.313
Houston	1	–	17	.056	5	–	25	.167
† 2025 Big 12 tournament winner Rankings from AP poll

The 2024–25 UCF Knights women's basketball team represented the University of Central Florida during the 2024–25 NCAA Division I women's basketball season. The Knights were led by third-year head coach Sytia Messer and played their home games at the Addition Financial Arena in Orlando, Florida as members of the Big 12 Conference.

== Previous season ==
The Knights finished the 2023–24 season 12–17, 5–13 in Big 12 play, to finish in last place. They lost in the first round to Cincinnati of the Big 12 women's tournament.

== Offseason ==
=== Departures ===
Name	Number	Pos.	Height	Year	Hometown	Reason for departure
Laila Jewett	0	G	5' 10"	Junior	Woodbridge, VA	Transferred
Mya Burns	10	G	6' 10"	GS senior	North Augusta, SC	Graduated
Asia Todd	14	G	5' 9"	GS senior	Clayton, NC	Graduated
Timia Ware	21	G	5' 6"	Junior	Chicago, IL	Transferred to East Carolina
Sierra Godbolt	22	G	5' 6"	Sophomore	Orlando, FL	Transferred to Samford
Anzhané Hutton	23	F	6' 0"	Senior	Dallas, TX	Graduated
Jayla Kelly	24	C	6' 3"	Senior	Chesterfield, MO	Transferred to Charlotte
Morgan Robinson-Nwagwu	30	G	5' 8"	GS senior	Norcross, GA	Transferred to Georgia State
Mary McMillan	42	G	5' 6"	Senior	Apopka, FL	Transferred to Stetson

=== Incoming transfers ===
Name	Number	Pos.	Height	Year	Hometown	Previous school
Lucie Castagne	4	G	5' 4"	GS senior	Paris, France	Bryant
Nevaeh Brown	8	G	5' 9"	Senior	Charlotte, NC	East Tennessee State
Hannah Gusters	21	C	6' 5"	GS senior	Dallas, TX	Oklahoma State
Ally Stedman	24	G	5' 9"	Senior	Phoenix, AZ	Miami (FL)

==== Recruiting ====
There was no recruiting class of 2023.

== Roster ==
2024–25 UCF Knights women's basketball team
Players
Coaches

Pos.	#	Name	Height	Year	Previous school	Hometown
G	3	Kaitlin Peterson	5 ft 9 in (1.75 m)	Sr	Eufaula; Indiana	Eufaula, AL
G	4	Lucie Castagne	5 ft 6 in (1.68 m)	GS	Putnam Science Academy; Bryant	Paris, France
G	8	Nevaeh Brown	5 ft 9 in (1.75 m)	Sr	Mallard Creek; East Tennessee State	Charlotte, NC
F	11	Achol Akot	6 ft 1 in (1.85 m)	So	Capital Courts Academy	Ottawa, ON
G/F	12	Emely Rodriguez	6 ft 0 in (1.83 m)	Fr	Central Pointe Academy	La Romana, DR
G/F	13	Summer Yancy	5 ft 11 in (1.8 m)	Fr	Lee's Summit North	Kansas City, MO
F	15	Taylor Gibson	6 ft 2 in (1.88 m)	Sr	Bishop McNamara; Michigan	Upper Marlboro, MD
C	21	Hannah Gusters	6 ft 6 in (1.98 m)	GS	MacArthur High School; Oklahoma State	Dallas, TX
F	22	Adeang Ring	6 ft 5 in (1.96 m)	Fr	Bella Vista College Prep	Sydney, Australia
C	23	Arek Angui	6 ft 8 in (2.03 m)	Fr	Greenforest	Juba, South Sudan
G	24	Ally Stedman	5 ft 9 in (1.75 m)	Sr	Pinnacle; Miami (FL)	Phoenix, AZ
F	33	Mahogany Chandler-Robnets	6 ft 2 in (1.88 m)	Fr	Benson Tech	Portland, OR
C	35	Khyala Ngodu	6 ft 3 in (1.91 m)	So	Dillard	Fort Lauderdale, FL

Head coach

- Sytia Messer (Arkansas)

Assistant coach(es)

- Mike Carey (Salem)
- Walter Pitts (Alabama)
- Rekha Patterson (North Carolina A&T)

Legend

- (C) Team captain
- (S) Suspended
- (I) Ineligible
- (W) Walk-on
- Injured
- Current redshirt

Roster
Last update: January 3, 2025

== Schedule and results ==
Date time, TV	Rank^{#}	Opponent^{#}	Result	Record	High points	High rebounds	High assists	Site (attendance) city, state
Exhibition
October 29, 2024*; 7:00 p.m.		Edward Waters	W 107–56		–	–	–	Addition Financial Arena; Orlando, FL
Non-conference regular season
November 5, 2024*; 7:00 p.m., ESPN+		Iona	W 76–44	1–0	22 – Peterson	13 – Akot	2 – tied	Addition Financial Arena (812); Orlando, FL
November 7, 2024*; 7:00 p.m., ESPN+		Marquette	W 57–50	2–0	18 – Rodriguez	12 – Gusters	4 – tied	Addition Financial Arena (1,107); Orlando, FL
November 16, 2024*; 4:00 p.m., ESPN+		Stetson	W 89–58	3–0	19 – Akot	11 – Akot	5 – tied	Addition Financial Arena (1,225); Orlando, FL
November 19, 2024*; 11:00 a.m., ESPN+		North Florida	W 82–53	4–0	23 – Peterson	11 – Gusters	5 – Brown	Addition Financial Arena (2,578); Orlando, FL
November 22, 2024*; 7:00 p.m., ESPN+		SIU Edwardsville	W 81–71	5–0	35 – Peterson	10 – Gusters	4 – Akot	Addition Financial Arena (615); Orlando, FL
November 24, 2024*; 1:00 p.m., ESPN+		Florida A&M	W 80–55	6–0	22 – Gusters	11 – Gusters	5 – Akot	Addition Financial Arena (1,187); Orlando, FL
November 27, 2024*; 3:00 p.m., MW Network		at UNLV; UNLV Thanksgiving Classic	L 51–72	6–1	18 – Gusters	12 – Akot	3 – Brown	Thomas & Mack Center (949); Paradise, NV
November 29, 2024*; 3:00 p.m.		vs. Montana State; UNLV Thanksgiving Classic	L 68–76	6–2	21 – Peterson	12 – Rodriguez	6 – Brown	Thomas & Mack Center (906); Paradise, NV
December 7, 2024*; 1:00 p.m.		at Texas Southern	W 93–87	7–2	39 – Peterson	14 – Akot	7 – tied	H&PE Arena (272); Houston, TX
December 17, 2024*; 7:00 p.m., ESPN+		High Point	L 60–64	7–3	22 – Ngodu	12 – Ngodu	5 – tied	Addition Financial Arena (1,003); Orlando, FL
Big 12 regular season
December 21, 2024; 2:00 p.m., ESPN+		No. 12 TCU	L 52–92	7–4 (0–1)	17 – Rodriguez	6 – Rodriguez	2 – tied	Addition Financial Arena (1,796); Orlando, FL
January 1, 2025; 2:00 p.m., ESPN+		at No. 18 West Virginia	L 58–80	7–5 (0–2)	14 – Ngodu	7 – Ngodu	4 – Stedman	WVU Coliseum (5,232); Morgantown, WV
January 4, 2025; 2:00 p.m., ESPN+		Arizona	L 53–75	7–6 (0–3)	17 – Peterson	6 – Tied	6 – Brown	Addition Financial Arena (1,385); Orlando, FL
January 8, 2025; 9:00 p.m., ESPN+		at Colorado	L 62–81	7–7 (0–4)	24 – Peterson	6 – Rodriguez	4 – Castagne	CU Events Center (2,127); Boulder, CO
January 11, 2025; 2:00 p.m., ESPN+		Cincinnati	L 58–64	7–8 (0–5)	16 – Peterson	7 – Ngodu	3 – Akot	Addition Financial Arena (1,425); Orlando, FL
January 14, 2025; 7:30 p.m., ESPN+		at No. 10 TCU	L 81–90	7–9 (0–6)	33 – Peterson	10 – Akot	5 – Rodriguez	Schollmaier Arena (2,541); Fort Worth, TX
January 18, 2025; 4:00 p.m., ESPN+		No. 24т Oklahoma State	L 58–72	7–10 (0–7)	12 – Ring	8 – Ngodu	3 – Tied	Addition Financial Arena (3,002); Orlando, FL
January 25, 2025; 5:00 p.m., ESPN+		at Iowa State	L 56–90	7–11 (0–8)	23 – Brown	11 – Ring	6 – Akot	Hilton Coliseum (10,326); Ames, IA
January 29, 2025; 7:00 p.m., ESPN+		Baylor	L 64–75	7–12 (0–9)	25 – Brown	10 – Ring	7 – Ngodu	Addition Financial Arena (1,354); Orlando, FL
February 1, 2025; 12:00 p.m., ESPN+		Houston	W 70–56	8–12 (1–9)	19 – Blair	9 – McFarland	6 – Cooke	Addition Financial Arena (1,327); Orlando, FL
February 5, 2025; 9:00 p.m., ESPN+		at BYU	L 66–73	8–13 (1–10)	19 – Peterson	8 – Ngodu	3 – Brown	Marriott Center (2,153); Provo, UT
February 8, 2025; 3:30 p.m., ESPN+		at Utah	L 51–95	8–14 (1–11)	17 – Peterson	10 – Chandler-Roberts	3 – Brown	Jon M. Huntsman Center (5,909); Salt Lake City, UT
February 12, 2025; 7:00 p.m., ESPN+		Arizona State	W 85–76	9–14 (2–11)	34 – Peterson	9 – Tied	5 – Brown	Addition Financial Arena (1,002); Orlando, FL
February 15, 2025; 5:00 p.m., ESPN+		at No. 14 Kansas State	L 67–97	9–15 (2–12)	19 – Peterson	9 – Chandler-Roberts	3 – Akot	Bramlage Coliseum (6,246); Manhattan, KS
February 18, 2025; 7:30 p.m., ESPN+		at Kansas	L 58–63	9–16 (2–13)	14 – Rodriguez	9 – Tied	5 – Peterson	Allen Fieldhouse (1,937); Lawrence, KS
February 22, 2025; 2:00 p.m., ESPN+		Texas Tech	W 61–60	10–16 (3–13)	20 – Peterson	8 – Akot	4 – Peterson	Addition Financial Arena (1,207); Orlando, FL
February 25, 2025; 7:00 p.m., ESPN+		Iowa State	L 73–98	10–17 (3–14)	21 – Rodriguez	9 – Ngodu	4 – Brown	Addition Financial Arena (1,873); Orlando, FL
March 2, 2025; 3:00 p.m., ESPN+		at Houston	W 73–61	11–17 (4–14)	25 – Peterson	10 – Tied	4 – Rodriguez	Fertitta Center (759); Houston, TX
Big 12 Conference tournament
March 5, 2025; 12:00 p.m., ESPN+	(13)	vs. (12) BYU; First Round	W 81–69	12–17	35 – Peterson	8 – Tied	4 – Rodriguez	T-Mobile Center (4,617); Kansas City, MO
March 6, 2025; 12:00 p.m., ESPN+	(13)	vs. (5) No. 20 Kansas State; Second Round	L 65–80	12–18	21 – Peterson	6 – Ring	3 – Rodriguez	T-Mobile Center; Kansas City, MO
*Non-conference game. ^{#}Rankings from AP poll. (#) Tournament seedings in parentheses. All times are in Eastern.

== See also ==
- 2024–25 UCF Knights men's basketball team
