= 2024–25 Houston Cougars women's basketball team =

American college basketball season

2024–25 Houston Cougars women's basketball
- Conference: Big 12 Conference
- Record: 5–25 (1–17 Big 12)
- Head coach: Ronald Hughey (11th season)
- Associate head coach: Tai Dillard; Vonn Read
- Assistant coach: Chynna Grimes
- Home arena: Fertitta Center

2024–25 Big 12 Conference women's basketball standings
	Conf.				Overall
Team	W		L	PCT	W		L	PCT
No. 6 TCU †	16	–	2	.889	34	–	4	.895
No. 14 Baylor	15	–	3	.833	28	–	8	.778
No. 17 Oklahoma State	14	–	4	.778	25	–	7	.781
No. 16 West Virginia	13	–	5	.722	25	–	8	.758
No. 19 Kansas State	13	–	5	.722	28	–	8	.778
Utah	13	–	5	.722	22	–	9	.710
Iowa State	12	–	6	.667	23	–	12	.657
Arizona	10	–	8	.556	19	–	14	.576
Colorado	9	–	9	.500	21	–	13	.618
Cincinnati	7	–	11	.389	15	–	14	.517
Kansas	6	–	12	.333	16	–	14	.533
BYU	4	–	14	.222	13	–	17	.433
UCF	4	–	14	.222	12	–	18	.400
Texas Tech	4	–	14	.222	19	–	18	.514
Arizona State	3	–	15	.167	10	–	22	.313
Houston	1	–	17	.056	5	–	25	.167
† 2025 Big 12 tournament winner Rankings from AP poll

The 2024–25 Houston Cougars women's basketball team represented the University of Houston during the 2024–25 NCAA Division I women's basketball season. The Cougars were led by eleventh-year head coach Ronald Hughey and played their home games at the Fertitta Center as members of the Big 12 Conference.

== Previous season ==
The Cougars finished the 2023–24 season 14–16, 5–13 in Big 12 play to finish in a three-way tie for eleventh place. As a No. 13 seed in the Big 12 women's tournament, they lost in the first round to Texas Tech.

== Offseason ==
=== Departures ===
Houston departures
Name	Number	Pos.	Height	Year	Hometown	Reason for departure
Bria Patterson	1	F	5'11"	GS senior	DeSoto, TX	Graduated
N'Yah Boyd	5	G	5'6"	GS senior	Mesquite, TX	Graduated
Britney Onyeje	10	G	5'9"	GS senior	Pflugerville, TX	Graduated
Ash'a Thompson	11	G	5'10"	Senior	DeSoto, TX	Transferred to Prairie View A&M
Djessira Diaware	30	F	6'3"	Senior	Bamako, Mali	Transferred to San Jose State
Amari Conn	32	G	5'7"	Senior	Kansas City, MO	Graduated
Logyn McNeil	33	F	6'3"	(redshirt) Sophomore	Rockwall, TX	TBD
Kamryn Jones	34	F	6'1"	Senior	Magnolia, TX	Transferred to Louisiana
Shalexxus Aaron	35	G	6'1"	(redshirt) Senior	Apple Valley, CA	Graduated

=== Incoming ===
Houston incoming transfers
Name	Num	Pos.	Height	Year	Hometown	Previous school
Leilani Augmon	0	G	5'11"	(redshirt) Senior	San Jose, CA	Troy
Summer Bostock	8	G	6'1"	Sophomore	Toronto, ON	Maryland
Kateri Poole	15	G	5'8"	Senior	Bronx, NY	LSU
Kiera Edmonds	21	F	6'2"	Sophomore	Brooklyn, NY	Wagner
Eylia Love	24	G	6'1"	Senior	Kansas City, MO	Louisville
Ashley Chevalier	25	G	5'7"	Senior	Chatsworth, CA	Texas Tech

==== Recruiting ====
There was no recruiting class of 2024.

== Roster ==
2024–25 Houston Cougars women's basketball team
Players
Coaches

Pos.	#	Name	Height	Year	Previous school	Hometown
G	0	Leilani Augmon	5 ft 11 in (1.8 m)	RS Sr	Silver Creek; Troy	Orlando, FL
G	2	Kierra Merchant	5 ft 7 in (1.7 m)	So	Westfield	Spring, TX
G	3	Gia Cooke	5 ft 9 in (1.75 m)	RS So	Bishop McNamara; Maryland	Clinton, MD
F	5	Maliyah Johnson	6 ft 0 in (1.83 m)	Sr	Africentric Early College; Pittsburgh	Columbus, OH
G	8	Summer Bostock	6 ft 1 in (1.85 m)	So	King's Christian Collegiate; Maryland	Toronto, ON
G	14	Laila Blair	5 ft 8 in (1.73 m)	GS	Waller	Houston, TX
G	15	Kateri Poole	5 ft 8 in (1.73 m)	Sr	South Shore; LSU	Bronx, NY
G	20	Tatiana Arevalo (W)	5 ft 9 in (1.75 m)	So	Reedy	Frisco, TX
F	21	Kiera Edmonds	6 ft 2 in (1.88 m)	So	Brooklyn & Law Tech; Wagner	Brooklyn, New York
F	22	Avalon Miller	6 ft 3 in (1.91 m)	RS Sr	Riverton; Gulf Coast State College	Salt Lake City, UT
G	24	Eylia Love	6 ft 1 in (1.85 m)	Sr	Olathe North; Louisville	Kansas City, MO
G	25	Ashley Chevalier	5 ft 7 in (1.7 m)	Sr	Sierra Canyon; Texas Tech	Chatsworth, CA
F	42	Peyton McFarland	6 ft 4 in (1.93 m)	GS	Boise; Utah	Boise, ID

Head coach

- Ronald Hughey (Limestone College)

Assistant coach(es)

- Tai Dillard (Texas)
- Vonn Read (Clark Atlanta)
- Chynna Grimes (Wichita State)

Legend

- (C) Team captain
- (S) Suspended
- (I) Ineligible
- (W) Walk-on
- Injured
- Current redshirt

Roster

== Schedule and results ==
Date time, TV	Rank^{#}	Opponent^{#}	Result	Record	High points	High rebounds	High assists	Site (attendance) city, state
Non-conference regular season
November 5, 2024*; 7:00 p.m., ESPN+		UT Rio Grande Valley	L 68–70	0–1	18 – Tied	8 – Augmon	6 – Chevalier	Fertitta Center (759); Houston, TX
November 8, 2024*; 5:00 p.m., SECN+		at Georgia	L 47–61	0–2	17 – Love	9 – Love	3 – Chevalier	Stegeman Coliseum (1,739); Athens, GA
November 14, 2024*; 7:00 p.m., ESPN+		at Rice; Rivalry	L 48–60	0–3	21 – Cooke	7 – Augmon	2 – Love	Tudor Fieldhouse (869); Houston, TX
November 17, 2024*; 2:00 p.m., ESPN+		Houston Christian	W 54–52	1–3	14 – Love	5 – Tied	5 – Cooke	Fertitta Center (751); Houston, TX
November 21, 2024*; 7:00 p.m., ESPN+		Alcorn State	W 73–48	2–3	13 – Merchant	10 – Love	5 – Chevalier	Fertitta Center (608); Houston, TX
November 24, 2024*; 2:00 p.m., ESPN+		North Texas	L 53–69	2–4	19 – Love	8 – Love	2 – Love	Fertitta Center (864); Houston, TX
November 29, 2024*; 1:15 p.m., YouTube		vs. Minnesota; Big Easy Classic Bayou Tournament	L 44–61	2–5	10 – Tied	6 – Tied	3 – Chevalier	Alario Center (214); Westwego, LA
November 30, 2024*; 3:30 p.m., YouTube		vs. Pacific; Big Easy Classic Bayou Tournament	L 60–64	2–6	15 – Cooke	5 – Augmon	2 – Tied	Alario Center (178); Westwego, LA
December 4, 2024*; 6:30 p.m., ESPN+		at UT Arlington	L 57–61	2–7	18 – Blair	13 – Love	6 – Blair	College Park Center (901); Arlington, TX
December 8, 2024*; 2:00 p.m., ESPN+		Southeastern Louisiana	W 70–65	3–7	19 – Blair	10 – Augmon	2 – Tied	Fertitta Center (846); Houston, TX
December 17, 2024*; 11:00 a.m., ESPN+		Mississippi Valley State	W 98–40	4–7	30 – Merchant	17 – Love	6 – Blair	Fertitta Center (1,229); Houston, TX
Big 12 regular season
December 22, 2024; 2:00 p.m., ESPN+		at Texas Tech	L 59–74	4–8 (0–1)	12 – Cooke	5 – McFarland	2 – Augmon	United Supermarkets Arena (4,227); Lubbock, TX
January 1, 2025; 6:30 p.m., ESPN+		No. 12 Kansas State	L 55–74	4–9 (0–2)	16 – Love	6 – Love	3 – Blair	Fertitta Center (739); Houston, TX
January 4, 2025; 6:00 p.m., ESPN+		Arizona State	L 60–69	4–10 (0–3)	18 – McFarland	13 – McFarland	10 – Chevalier	Fertitta Center (904); Houston, TX
January 8, 2025; 8:00 p.m., ESPN+		at BYU	L 75–89	4–11 (0–4)	23 – Merchant	5 – Tied	5 – Blair	Marriott Center (1,492); Provo, UT
January 11, 2025; 2:30 p.m., ESPN+		at No. 22 Utah	L 42–69	4–12 (0–5)	16 – Blair	5 – Merchant	3 – Blair	Jon M. Huntsman Center (4,326); Salt Lake City, UT
January 14, 2025; 7:00 p.m., ESPN+		No. 24 Oklahoma State	W 79–76	5–12 (1–5)	20 – Merchant	11 – Augmon	7 – Blair	Fertitta Center (613); Houston, TX
January 17, 2025; 7:00 p.m., ESPN+		at Baylor	L 51–70	5–13 (1–6)	17 – Cooke	7 – Love	2 – Tied	Foster Pavilion (3,321); Waco, TX
January 22, 2025; 1:00 p.m., ESPN+		Texas Tech	L 44–62	5–14 (1–7)	15 – Blair	7 – Love	3 – Blair	Fertitta Center (611); Houston, TX
January 25, 2025; 2:00 p.m., ESPN+		Kansas	L 43–57	5–15 (1–8)	16 – Blair	7 – Tied	3 – Tied	Fertitta Center (1,405); Houston, TX
January 29, 2025; 5:30 p.m., ESPN+		at Cincinnati	L 65–73	5–16 (1–9)	21 – Hayes	18 – Hayes	2 – Tied	Fifth Third Arena (1,495); Cincinnati, OH
February 1, 2025; 11:00 a.m., ESPN+		at UCF	L 56–70	5–17 (1–10)	19 – Blair	9 – McFarland	6 – Cooke	Addition Financial Arena (1,327); Orlando, FL
February 5, 2025; 7:00 p.m., ESPN+		Baylor	L 47–92	5–18 (1–11)	13 – Tied	7 – McFarland	3 – Blair	Fertitta Center (1,187); Houston, TX
February 8, 2025; 2:00 p.m., ESPN+		No. 18 West Virginia	L 51–79	5–19 (1–12)	16 – Cooke	10 – Merchant	5 – Blair	Fertitta Center (901); Houston, TX
February 15, 2025; 7:00 p.m., ESPN+		at Colorado	L 60–83	5–20 (1–13)	18 – Blair	6 – Merchant	3 – Tied	CU Events Center (4,494); Boulder, CO
February 19, 2025; 6:30 p.m., ESPN+		at Iowa State	L 53–64	5–21 (1–14)	13 – Tied	8 – Tied	7 – Love	Hilton Coliseum (9,047); Ames, IA
February 22, 2025; 7:00 p.m., ESPN+		Arizona	L 72–74 ^{OT}	5–22 (1–15)	21 – Blair	14 – Love	5 – Blair	Fertitta Center (1,198); Houston, TX
February 26, 2025; 6:30 p.m., ESPN+		at No. 10 TCU	L 56–91	5–23 (1–16)	25 – Cooke	5 – Tied	3 – Blair	Schollmaier Arena (3,126); Fort Worth, TX
March 2, 2025; 2:00 p.m., ESPN+		UCF	L 61–73	5–24 (1–17)	20 – Love	6 – Augmon	3 – Cooke	Fertitta Center (759); Houston, TX
Big 12 Conference Tournament
March 5, 2025; 1:00 p.m., ESPN+	(16)	vs. (9) Colorado; First round	L 58–66	5–25	15 – Blair	6 – Merchant	6 – Blair	T-Mobile Center (4,617); Kansas City, MO
*Non-conference game. ^{#}Rankings from AP Poll. (#) Tournament seedings in parentheses. All times are in Central Time.

== See also ==
- 2024–25 Houston Cougars men's basketball team
