= 2024–25 BYU Cougars women's basketball team =

Intercollegiate basketball season

2024–25 BYU Cougars women's basketball
- Conference: Big 12 Conference
- Record: 13–17 (4–14 Big 12)
- Head coach: Amber Whiting (3rd season)
- Associate head coach: Lee Cummard (6th season)
- Assistant coaches: Jordan Loera (1st season); John Wardenburg (2nd season); Keilani Unga (1st season); Josh Edwards (1st season)
- Home arena: Marriott Center

2024–25 Big 12 Conference women's basketball standings
	Conf.				Overall
Team	W		L	PCT	W		L	PCT
No. 6 TCU †	16	–	2	.889	34	–	4	.895
No. 14 Baylor	15	–	3	.833	28	–	8	.778
No. 17 Oklahoma State	14	–	4	.778	25	–	7	.781
No. 16 West Virginia	13	–	5	.722	25	–	8	.758
No. 19 Kansas State	13	–	5	.722	28	–	8	.778
Utah	13	–	5	.722	22	–	9	.710
Iowa State	12	–	6	.667	23	–	12	.657
Arizona	10	–	8	.556	19	–	14	.576
Colorado	9	–	9	.500	21	–	13	.618
Cincinnati	7	–	11	.389	15	–	14	.517
Kansas	6	–	12	.333	16	–	14	.533
BYU	4	–	14	.222	13	–	17	.433
UCF	4	–	14	.222	12	–	18	.400
Texas Tech	4	–	14	.222	19	–	18	.514
Arizona State	3	–	15	.167	10	–	22	.313
Houston	1	–	17	.056	5	–	25	.167
† 2025 Big 12 tournament winner Rankings from AP poll

The 2024–25 BYU Cougars women's basketball team represented Brigham Young University during the 2024–25 NCAA Division I women's basketball season. The Cougars, led by third-year head coach Amber Whiting and played their home games at the Marriott Center as members of the Big 12 Conference.

Despite making the postseason in two of their first three years under Whiting, she was fired as head coach on March 8, following a first-round exit against UCF in the Big 12 tournament.

== Previous season ==
The Cougars finished the 2023–24 season 16–17, 6–12 in Big 12 play to finish in a tie for ninth place. As No. 10 seed in the Big 12 tournament where they lost in the second round to Kansas. They were received at-large bid to the WBIT where they lost in the first round to Santa Clara.

== Offseason ==
=== Departures ===
BYU Departures
Name	Number	Pos.	Height	Year	Hometown	Reason for Departure
Nani Falatea	3	G	5'9"	Junior	Salt Lake City, UT	Transferred to Oregon
Ali'a Matavao	4	F	6'0"	Freshman	Las Vegas, NV	Transferred to Loyola Marymount
Kailey Woolston	10	G	5'11"	Freshman	Highland, UT	LDS Mission (returning in 2025–26)
Kaylee Smiler	11	G	5'8"	(redshirt) Senior	Hamilton, New Zealand	Graduated
Lauren Gustin	12	G	5'8"	(redshirt) Senior	Salem, UT	Graduated
McKinley Willardson	15	F	6'1"	Freshman	Corona, CA	LDS Mission (returning in 2025–26)
Marina Mata	20	F	6'1"	Freshman	Barbastro, Spain	Signed to play professionally in Spain with Cadi La Seu
Rose Bubakar	24	F	6'0"	Junior	Frederick, MD	Transferred to Weber State

=== Incoming ===
BYU incoming transfers
Name	Num	Pos.	Height	Year	Hometown	Previous School
Kemery Martín	15	G	6'0"	(redshirt) Senior	Sandy, UT	California
Marya Hudgins	23	G	6'0"	Junior	Aurora, CO	Santa Clara
Hattie Ogden	33	G/F	6'2"	Junior	Magrath, AB	Buffalo
Kendra Gillispie	35	F	6'1"	Senior	Oklahoma City, OK	Arkansas State

==== Recruiting ====
College recruiting information
Name	Hometown	School	Height	Weight	Commit date
Delaney Gibb; PG	Raymond, AB	Raymond High School	5 ft 10 in (1.78 m)	N/A	
Delaney Gibb; PG	Recruit ratings: ESPN: (92)				
Overall recruit ranking:
Note: In many cases, Scout, Rivals, 247Sports, On3, and ESPN may conflict in their listings of height and weight.; In these cases, the average was taken. ESPN grades are on a 100-point scale.; Sources: "2024 Player Commits". ESPN. Archived from the original on December 9, 2024.

==== Recruiting class of 2025 ====
College recruiting information (2025)
Name	Hometown	School	Height	Weight	Commit date
Sydney Benally; PG	Albuquerque, NM	Sandia High School	5 ft 8 in (1.73 m)	N/A	
Sydney Benally; PG	Recruit ratings: ESPN: (91)				
Overall recruit ranking:
Note: In many cases, Scout, Rivals, 247Sports, On3, and ESPN may conflict in their listings of height and weight.; In these cases, the average was taken. ESPN grades are on a 100-point scale.; Sources: "2025 Player Commits". ESPN. Archived from the original on December 9, 2024.

== Roster ==
2024–25 BYU Cougars women's basketball team
Players
Coaches

Pos.	#	Name	Height	Year	Previous school	Hometown
G	0	Naia Tanuvasa	5 ft 10 in (1.78 m)	Fr	Lone Peak	Highland, UT
G	1	Amari Whiting	5 ft 10 in (1.78 m)	So	Burley	Boise, ID
G	2	Kylie Krebs	5 ft 7 in (1.7 m)	Sr	Christian Liberty Academy; Glendale CC	Oahu, HI
G	8	Arielle Mackey-Williams	5 ft 9 in (1.75 m)	RS Jr	Tai Wananga Ki Ruakura	Ngati Porou, New Zealand
G	11	Delaney Gibb	5 ft 10 in (1.78 m)	Fr	Raymond	Raymond, AB
G	14	Kambree Barber	6 ft 0 in (1.83 m)	Fr	Rigby	Rigby, ID
G	15	Kemery Congdon	6 ft 0 in (1.83 m)	RS Sr	Corner Canyon; California	Sandy, UT
F	21	Heather Hamson	6 ft 3 in (1.91 m)	RS Jr	Pleasant Grove	Lindon, UT
G	23	Marya Hudgins	6 ft 0 in (1.83 m)	Jr	Grandview; Santa Clara	Aurora, CO
G/F	24	Brinley Cannon	6 ft 1 in (1.85 m)	Fr	Shelley	Shelley, ID
F	25	Emma Calvert	6 ft 4 in (1.93 m)	Sr	Fremont	Farr West, UT
G	30	Lauren Davenport	6 ft 0 in (1.83 m)	Sr	Thunder Ridge High School; Boston University	Idaho Falls, ID
F	33	Hattie Ogden	6 ft 1 in (1.85 m)	Jr	Magrath High School; Buffalo	Magrath, AB
F	35	Kendra Gillispie	6 ft 2 in (1.88 m)	Sr	Harding Charter; Arkansas State	Oklahoma City, OK
C	45	Sarah Bartholomew	6 ft 3 in (1.91 m)	Fr	Lone Peak	Highland, UT

Head coach

- Amber Whiting (BYU)

Assistant coach(es)

- Lee Cummard (BYU)
- Jordan Loera (Oregon)
- John Wardenburg (BYU)
- Keilani Unga (BYU)
- Josh Edwards (St. Catharine)

Legend

- (C) Team captain
- (S) Suspended
- (I) Ineligible
- (W) Walk-on
- Injured
- Current redshirt

Roster

== Schedule and results ==
Date time, TV	Rank^{#}	Opponent^{#}	Result	Record	High points	High rebounds	High assists	Site (attendance) city, state
Exhibition
October 29, 2024*; 7:00 p.m.		Westminster	W 105–37		22 – Whiting	6 – Tied	5 – Congdon	Marriott Center (2,789); Provo, UT
Non-conference regular season
November 6, 2024*; 7:00 p.m., ESPN+		Idaho	W 67–62	1–0	17 – Gibb	9 – Hudgins	5 – Tied	Marriott Center (2,876); Provo, UT
November 9, 2024*; 2:00 p.m., ESPN+		Wyoming	W 76–63	2–0	22 – Gibb	6 – Tied	6 – Gibb	Marriott Center (1,396); Provo, UT
November 13, 2024*; 11:00 a.m., ESPN+		Colorado State	W 69–55	3–0	19 – Gibb	8 – Whiting	4 – Whiting	Marriott Center (5,154); Provo, UT
November 16, 2024*; 7:00 p.m., ESPN+		at Idaho State	W 77–68	4–0	22 – Gibb	10 – Whiting	3 – Whiting	Reed Gym (2,133); Pocatello, ID
November 19, 2024*; 7:00 p.m., ESPN+		McNeese	W 85–64	5–0	18 – Tied	7 – Tied	7 – Gibb	Marriott Center (1,488); Provo, UT
November 23, 2024*; 3:00 p.m., ESPN+		Northern Colorado	L 60–67 ^{OT}	5–1	16 – Calvert	10 – Calvert	6 – Tied	Marriott Center (1,158); Provo, UT
November 28, 2024*; 7:00 p.m., FloHoops		vs. Rice; Cancún Challenge Riviera Division	W 63–51	6–1	20 – Gibb	8 – Whiting	5 – Gibb	Hard Rock Hotel Riviera Maya (174); Cancún, Mexico
November 29, 2024*; 7:00 p.m., FloHoops		vs. No. 22 Iowa; Cancún Challenge Riviera Division	L 48–68	6–2	13 – Congdon	5 – Whiting	2 – Tied	Hard Rock Hotel Riviera Maya (500); Cancún, Mexico
December 5, 2024*; 7:00 p.m., ESPN+		at UTEP	W 81–68	7–2	27 – Calvert	7 – Calvert	7 – Whiting	Don Haskins Center (1,459); El Paso, TX
December 10, 2024*; 7:00 p.m., ESPN+		Utah Valley	W 76–36	8–2	20 – Davenport	10 – Whiting	5 – Whiting	Marriott Center (2,112); Provo, UT
December 13, 2024*; 7:00 p.m., ESPN+		at Washington State	W 72–57	9–2	26 – Gibb	6 – Tied	4 – Gibb	Beasley Coliseum (901); Pullman, WA
Big 12 regular season
December 21, 2024; 2:00 p.m., ESPN+		Arizona	L 53–57	9–3 (0–1)	23 – Gibb	8 – Gibb	5 – Whiting	Marriott Center (2,075); Provo, UT
January 1, 2025; 12:00 p.m., ESPN+		at Cincinnati	L 63–72	9–4 (0–2)	14 – Tied	8 – Gibb	5 – Congdon	Fifth Third Arena (2,587); Cincinnati, OH
January 4, 2025; 4:00 p.m., ESPN+		at No. 18 West Virginia	L 53–66	9–5 (0–3)	16 – Congdon	13 – Calvert	3 – Whiting	WVU Coliseum (4,066); Morgantown, WV
January 8, 2025; 7:00 p.m., ESPN+		Houston	W 89–75	10–5 (1–3)	21 – Calvert	10 – Barber	7 – Congdon	Marriott Center (1,492); Provo, UT
January 11, 2025; 4:00 p.m., ESPN+		No. 12 Kansas State	L 65–92	10–6 (1–4)	18 – Gibb	7 – Gibb	5 – Gibb	Marriott Center (2,517); Provo, UT
January 18, 2025; 6:00 p.m., ESPN+		at Texas Tech	L 65–70	10–7 (1–5)	22 – Gibb	8 – Calvert	3 – Gibb	United Supermarkets Arena (4,008); Lubbock, TX
January 22, 2025; 5:30 p.m., ESPN+		at Iowa State	L 59–82	10–8 (1–6)	18 – Gibb	6 – Whiting	4 – Gibb	Hilton Coliseum (9,701); Ames, IA
January 25, 2025; 2:30 p.m., ESPNU		Utah; Rivalry	L 76–81	10–9 (1–7)	21 – Gibb	6 – Tied	5 – Tied	Marriott Center (4,889); Provo, UT
January 29, 2025; 7:00 p.m., ESPN+		Colorado	L 66–67	10–10 (1–8)	19 – Gibb	11 – Calvert	4 – Calvert	Marriott Center (2,020); Provo, UT
February 1, 2025; 6:30 p.m., ESPN+		at Arizona State	W 77–67	11–10 (2–8)	22 – Calvert	12 – Barber	6 – Whiting	Desert Financial Arena (2,590); Tempe, AZ
February 5, 2025; 7:00 p.m., ESPN+		UCF	W 73–66	12–10 (3–8)	19 – Gibb	11 – Barber	5 – Tied	Marriott Center (2,153); Provo, UT
February 8, 2025; 6:00 p.m., ESPN+		at Baylor	L 71–83	12–11 (3–9)	21 – Gibb	6 – Tied	5 – Gibb	Foster Pavilion (3,960); Waco, TX
February 11, 2025; 5:30 p.m., ESPN+		at No. 11 TCU	L 47–79	12–12 (3–10)	16 – Calvert	6 – Calvert	6 – Whiting	Schollmaier Arena (2,483); Fort Worth, TX
February 15, 2025; 3:00 p.m., ESPN+		No. 20 Oklahoma State	W 68–64	13–12 (4–10)	19 – Calvert	7 – Tied	6 – Gibb	Marriott Center (2,939); Provo, UT
February 19, 2025; 6:00 p.m., ESPN+		at Arizona	L 57–65	13–13 (4–11)	16 – Gibb	10 – Barber	5 – Gibb	McKale Center (6,957); Tucson, AZ
February 22, 2025; 4:00 p.m., ESPN+		Arizona State	L 73–85 ^{OT}	13–14 (4–12)	25 – Gibb	11 – Gibb	7 – Gibb	Marriott Center (3,037); Provo, UT
February 25, 2025; 7:00 p.m., ESPN+		Kansas	L 66–71	13–15 (4–13)	24 – Whiting	8 – Gibb	6 – Gibb	Marriott Center (2,149); Provo, UT
March 1, 2025; 1:30 p.m., ESPN+		at Utah; Rivalry	L 73–76 ^{OT}	13–16 (4–14)	36 – Gibb	10 – Gibb	5 – Gibb	Jon M. Huntsman Center (8,242); Salt Lake City, UT
Big 12 Conference Tournament
March 5, 2025; 10:00 a.m., ESPN+	(12)	vs. (13) UCF; First Round	L 69–81	13–17	15 – Gibb	5 – Tied	4 – Congdon	T-Mobile Center (4,617); Kansas City, MO
*Non-conference game. ^{#}Rankings from AP Poll. (#) Tournament seedings in parentheses. All times are in Mountain Time.

== Awards ==
In March 2025, Delaney Gibb was unanimously voted the Big 12 Conference Freshman of the Year, becoming the sixth BYU Cougar to earn conference Freshman or Newcomer of the Year honors.

== See also ==
- 2024–25 BYU Cougars men's basketball team
