= 2025 Big 12 Conference women's basketball tournament =

- Classification: Division I
- Season: 2024–25
- Teams: 16
- Site: T-Mobile Center; Kansas City, Missouri
- Champions: TCU (1st title)
- Winning coach: Mark Campbell (1st title)
- MVP: Hailey Van Lith (TCU)
- Attendance: 39,188
- Television: ESPN, ESPNU, ESPN+

2024–25 Big 12 Conference women's basketball standings
	Conf.				Overall
Team	W		L	PCT	W		L	PCT
No. 6 TCU †	16	–	2	.889	34	–	4	.895
No. 14 Baylor	15	–	3	.833	28	–	8	.778
No. 17 Oklahoma State	14	–	4	.778	25	–	7	.781
No. 16 West Virginia	13	–	5	.722	25	–	8	.758
No. 19 Kansas State	13	–	5	.722	28	–	8	.778
Utah	13	–	5	.722	22	–	9	.710
Iowa State	12	–	6	.667	23	–	12	.657
Arizona	10	–	8	.556	19	–	14	.576
Colorado	9	–	9	.500	21	–	13	.618
Cincinnati	7	–	11	.389	15	–	14	.517
Kansas	6	–	12	.333	16	–	14	.533
BYU	4	–	14	.222	13	–	17	.433
UCF	4	–	14	.222	12	–	18	.400
Texas Tech	4	–	14	.222	19	–	18	.514
Arizona State	3	–	15	.167	10	–	22	.313
Houston	1	–	17	.056	5	–	25	.167
† 2025 Big 12 tournament winner Rankings from AP poll

The 2025 Big 12 Women's Basketball Tournament was a postseason women's basketball tournament for the Big 12 Conference, played from March 5–9, 2025, at T-Mobile Center in Kansas City, Missouri

No. 1 TCU defeated No .2 Baylor 64–59 in the championship game, claiming their first Big 12 title, and earning the conference's automatic bid to the NCAA tournament.

== Seeds ==
With the conference's realignment to 16 teams, the new tournament format from the previous season was amended: teams were seeded by record within the conference, with a tiebreaker system to seed teams with identical conference records. The top eight teams received a first round bye, and the top four teams received a double bye, automatically advancing them into the quarterfinals.

Seed	School	Conference Record	Tiebreaker 1	Tiebreaker 2	Tiebreaker 3
1	TCU #‡	16–2			
2	Baylor ‡	15–3			
3	Oklahoma State ‡	14–4			
4	West Virginia ‡	13–5	2–0 vs. Kansas State/Utah		
5	Kansas State †	13–5	1–1 vs. West Virginia/Utah		
6	Utah †	13–5	0–2 vs. West Virginia/Kansas State		
7	Iowa State †	12–6			
8	Arizona †	10–8			
9	Colorado	9–9			
10	Cincinnati	7–11			
11	Kansas	6–12			
12	BYU	4–14	1–1 vs. UCF/Texas Tech	1–0 vs. Oklahoma State	
13	UCF	4–14	1–1 vs. BYU/Texas Tech	0–1 vs. Oklahoma State	1–0 vs. Texas Tech
14	Texas Tech	4–14	1–1 vs. BYU/UCF	0–1 vs. Oklahoma State	0–1 vs. UCF
15	Arizona State	3–15			
16	Houston	1–17			

Notes: # – Big 12 regular season champions, and tournament No. 1 seed
‡ – Received a double-bye into the conference tournament quarterfinal round
† – Received a single-bye into the conference tournament second round
Overall records include all games played in the 2025 Big 12 tournament.

== Schedule ==
Game	Time*	Matchup^{#}	Final score	Television	Attendance
First round – Wednesday, March 5
1	11:00 a.m.	No. 12 BYU vs No. 13 UCF	69–81	ESPN+	4,617
2	1:30 p.m.	No. 9 Colorado vs No. 16 Houston	66–58	ESPN+	4,617
3	5:30 p.m.	No. 10 Cincinnati vs No. 15 Arizona State	75–82	ESPN+	4,374
4	8:00 p.m.	No. 11 Kansas vs No. 14 Texas Tech	53–57	ESPN+	4,374
Second round – Thursday, March 6
5	11:00 a.m.	No. 5 Kansas State vs No. 13 UCF	80–65	ESPN+	4,265
6	1:30 p.m.	No. 8 Arizona vs No. 9 Colorado	58–61	ESPN+	4,265
7	5:30 p.m.	No. 7 Iowa State vs No. 15 Arizona State	96–88	ESPN+	4,582
8	8:00 p.m.	No. 6 Utah vs No. 14 Texas Tech	64–75	ESPN+	4,582
Quarterfinals – Friday, March 7
9	11:00 a.m.	No. 4 West Virginia vs No. 5 Kansas State	73–69	ESPNU	4,886
10	1:30 p.m.	No. 1 TCU vs No. 9 Colorado	69–62	ESPNU	4,886
11	5:30 p.m.	No. 2 Baylor vs No. 7 Iowa State	69–63	ESPN+	5,681
12	8:00 p.m.	No. 3 Oklahoma State vs No. 14 Texas Tech	62–59	ESPN+	5,681
Semifinals – Saturday, March 8
13	3:00 p.m.	No. 1 TCU vs No. 4 West Virginia	71–65	ESPN+	5,699
14	5:30 p.m.	No. 2 Baylor vs No. 3 Oklahoma State	84–74^{OT}	ESPN+	5,699
Championship – Sunday, March 9
15	4:00 p.m.	No. 1 TCU vs No. 2 Baylor	64–59	ESPN	5,084
*Game times in CDT. #-Rankings denote tournament seed

== Bracket ==
First round Wednesday, March 5
9	Colorado	66
16	Houston	58
12	BYU	69
13	UCF	81
10	Cincinnati	75
15	Arizona State	82
11	Kansas	53
14	Texas Tech	57

Second round Thursday, March 6
8	Arizona	58
9	Colorado	61
5	#20 Kansas State	80
13	UCF	65
7	Iowa State	96
15	Arizona State	88
6	Utah	64
14	Texas Tech	75

Quarterfinals; Friday, March 7
1	#8 TCU	69
9	Colorado	62
4	#16 West Virginia	73
5	#20 Kansas State	69
2	#17 Baylor	69
7	Iowa State	63
3	#21 Oklahoma State	62
14	Texas Tech	59

Semifinals; Saturday, March 8
1	#8 TCU	71
4	#16 West Virginia	65
2	#17 Baylor	84*
3	#21 Oklahoma State	74

Championship; Sunday, March 9
1	#8 TCU	64
2	#17 Baylor	59
