= 2024–25 TCU Horned Frogs women's basketball team =

Intercollegiate basketball season team

2024–25 TCU Horned Frogs women's basketball

Big 12 regular season and tournament champions

NCAA tournament, Elite Eight
- Conference: Big 12 Conference

Ranking
- Coaches: No. 6
- AP: No. 6
- Record: 34–4 (16–2 Big 12)
- Head coach: Mark Campbell (2nd season)
- Assistant coaches: Xavier Lopez; Minyon Moore; Nia Jackson; Jessie Craig
- Home arena: Schollmaier Arena

2024–25 Big 12 Conference women's basketball standings
	Conf.				Overall
Team	W		L	PCT	W		L	PCT
No. 6 TCU †	16	–	2	.889	34	–	4	.895
No. 14 Baylor	15	–	3	.833	28	–	8	.778
No. 17 Oklahoma State	14	–	4	.778	25	–	7	.781
No. 16 West Virginia	13	–	5	.722	25	–	8	.758
No. 19 Kansas State	13	–	5	.722	28	–	8	.778
Utah	13	–	5	.722	22	–	9	.710
Iowa State	12	–	6	.667	23	–	12	.657
Arizona	10	–	8	.556	19	–	14	.576
Colorado	9	–	9	.500	21	–	13	.618
Cincinnati	7	–	11	.389	15	–	14	.517
Kansas	6	–	12	.333	16	–	14	.533
BYU	4	–	14	.222	13	–	17	.433
UCF	4	–	14	.222	12	–	18	.400
Texas Tech	4	–	14	.222	19	–	18	.514
Arizona State	3	–	15	.167	10	–	22	.313
Houston	1	–	17	.056	5	–	25	.167
† 2025 Big 12 tournament winner Rankings from AP poll

The 2024–25 TCU Horned Frogs women's basketball team represented Texas Christian University during the 2024–25 NCAA Division I women's basketball season. The Horned Frogs were led by second-year head coach Mark Campbell and played their home games at the Schollmaier Arena in Fort Worth, Texas as members of the Big 12 Conference.

TCU aimed to build on their previous season's performance, improve on their record of 21–12, and compete for a higher seed in the postseason tournaments.

== Previous season ==
The Horned Frogs finished the 2023–24 season with a record of 21–12, including a conference record of 6–12, and reached the second round of the WBIT. They started strong with a 14–0 record, but faced challenges that included injuries, leading to a roster adjustment through open tryouts.

== Offseason ==
=== Departures ===
TCU departures
Name	Number	Pos.	Height	Year	Hometown	Reason for departure
Jaden Owens	1	G	5' 8"	GS senior	Plano, TX	Graduated
Tara Manumaleuga	2	G	5' 10"	GS senior	Gold Coast, Australia	Graduated
Bre'Yon White	12	F	5' 11"	Junior	Pearland, TX	Transferred to Wichita State
Jade Clack	14	F	6' 1"	Freshman	Austin, TX	Transferred to Tulsa
Paige Bradley	15	G	5' 9"	Junior	Dallas, TX	Graduate transfer to Tulsa (missed 2023–24 season with foot injuries)
Sydney Harris	25	G/F	6' 1"	Sophomore	Edwardsville, IL	Transferred to Iowa State
Victoria Flores	55	G	5' 7"	Freshman	West Dallas, TX	Transferred to Rice

=== Incoming ===
TCU incoming transfers
Name	Num	Pos.	Height	Year	Hometown	Previous school
Taylor Bigby	1	G	6' 1"	(redshirt) Junior	Las Vegas, NV	USC
Deasia Merrill	3	F	6' 1"	GS senior	Villa Rica, GA	Georgia State
Donovyn Hunter	4	G	6' 0"	Sophomore	Medford, OR	Oregon State
Hailey Van Lith	10	G	5' 7"	GS senior	Wenatchee, WA	LSU
Natalie Mazurek	14	C	6' 2"	GS senior	Eden Prairie, MN	South Dakota
Maddie Scherr	22	G	5' 10"	GS senior	Florence, KY	Kentucky

==== Recruiting ====
There was no recruiting class of 2024.

== Roster ==
2024–25 TCU Horned Frogs women's basketball team
Players
Coaches

Pos.	#	Name	Height	Year	Previous school	Hometown
G	1	Taylor Bigby	6 ft 1 in (1.85 m)	RS Jr	Centennial; USC / Oregon	Las Vegas, NV
G	2	Madison Conner	5 ft 11 in (1.8 m)	Sr	Compass Prep; Arizona	Chandler, AZ
F	3	Deasia Merrill	6 ft 1 in (1.85 m)	GS	Villa Rica High School; Georgia State / Kentucky	Villa Rica, GA
G	4	Donovyn Hunter	6 ft 0 in (1.83 m)	So	South Medford; Oregon State	Medford, OR
G	5	Una Jovanovic	5 ft 9 in (1.75 m)	Sr	Pinewood; Cal State Fullerton	Santa Clara, CA
G	10	Hailey Van Lith	5 ft 9 in (1.75 m)	GS	Cashmere High School; LSU / Louisville	Wenatchee, WA
G	11	Knisha Godfrey	5 ft 9 in (1.75 m)	RS Jr	Tampa Bay Technical; Mississippi State	Columbus, OH
C	13	Sedona Prince	6 ft 7 in (2.01 m)	GS	Liberty Hill; Oregon	Liberty Hill, TX
F	14	Natalie Mazurek	6 ft 2 in (1.88 m)	GS	Eden Prairie High School; South Dakota	Eden Prairie, MN
G	20	Ella Hamlin	5 ft 9 in (1.75 m)	So	Granbury High School	Granbury, TX
G	21	Agnes Emma-Nnopu	5 ft 11 in (1.8 m)	GS	Lake Ginninderra College; Stanford	Ocean Grove, Australia
G	22	Maddie Scherr (injured) (redshirt)	5 ft 10 in (1.78 m)	GS	Ryle High School; Kentucky / Oregon	Florence, KY
F	23	Aaliyah Roberson	6 ft 2 in (1.88 m)	Jr	Clark	San Antonio, TX
F	24	DaiJa Turner	6 ft 3 in (1.91 m)	RS Jr	Village Christian Academy	Fayetteville, NC

Head coach

- Mark Campbell (Hawaiʻi)

Assistant coach(es)

- Xavier López (Point Loma)
- Minyon Moore (Oregon)
- Nia Jackson (Oregon)
- Jessie Craig (Alaska–Anchorage)
- Nolan Wilson (Prairie View A&M)

Legend

- (C) Team captain
- (S) Suspended
- (I) Ineligible
- (W) Walk-on
- Injured
- Current redshirt

Roster
Last update: November 25, 2024

== Schedule and results ==
Date time, TV	Rank^{#}	Opponent^{#}	Result	Record	High points	High rebounds	High assists	Site (attendance) city, state
Regular season
November 5, 2024*; 6:30 p.m., ESPN+		Houston Christian	W 78–41	1–0	29 – Prince	7 – Prince	4 – tied	Schollmaier Arena (1,946); Fort Worth, TX
November 10, 2024*; 2:00 p.m., ESPN+		New Orleans	W 107–52	2–0	30 – Conner	12 – tied	6 – Van Lith	Schollmaier Arena (1,895); Fort Worth, TX
November 13, 2024*; 6:30 p.m., ESPN+		Texas State	W 90–31	3–0	17 – Van Lith	6 – tied	9 – Van Lith	Schollmaier Arena (2,273); Fort Worth, TX
November 17, 2024*; 2:00 p.m., ESPN		No. 13 NC State	W 76–73	4–0	31 – Prince	16 – Prince	10 – Van Lith	Schollmaier Arena (3,220); Fort Worth, TX
November 21, 2024*; 12:00 p.m., ESPN+	No. 19	Incarnate Word	W 81–43	5–0	19 – Van Lith	11 – Prince	6 – Van Lith	Schollmaier Arena (5,379); Fort Worth, TX
November 24, 2024*; 4:00 p.m., ESPN+	No. 19	Idaho State	W 86–46	6–0	27 – Van Lith	7 – Prince	4 – tied	Schollmaier Arena (2,293); Fort Worth, TX
November 29, 2024*; 4:00 p.m., FloSports	No. 17	vs. No. 3 Notre Dame; Cayman Islands Classic	W 76–68	7–0	21 – Van Lith	20 – Prince	7 – Van Lith	John Gray Gymnasium (1,034); George Town, Cayman Islands
November 30, 2024*; 5:30 p.m., FloSports	No. 17	vs. South Florida; Cayman Islands Classic	W 87–46	8–0	23 – Van Lith	13 – Prince	8 – Van Lith	John Gray Gymnasium (895); George Town, Cayman Islands
December 4, 2024*; 6:30 p.m., ESPN+	No. 9	Florida Atlantic	W 78–42	9–0	16 – Van Lith	8 – Conner	7 – Conner	Schollmaier Arena (1,968); Fort Worth, TX
December 8, 2024*; 6:00 p.m., ESPN2	No. 9	vs. No. 3 South Carolina; Coast-to-Coast Challenge	L 52–85	9–1	21 – Van Lith	6 – Conner	6 – Van Lith	Dickies Arena (8,004); Fort Worth, TX
December 15, 2024*; 2:00 p.m., ESPN+	No. 12	Louisiana Tech; Maggie Dixon Classic	W 92–41	10–1	23 – Van Lith	10 – Emma-Nnopu	5 – Emma-Nnopu	Schollmaier Arena (2,088); Fort Worth, TX
December 17, 2024*; 6:30 p.m., ESPN+	No. 12	Samford	W 103–64	11–1	33 – Conner	14 – Emma-Nnopu	8 – Van Lith	Schollmaier Arena (1,940); Fort Worth, TX
December 21, 2024; 1:00 p.m., ESPN+	No. 12	at UCF	W 92–52	12–1 (1–0)	24 – Conner	7 – tied	7 – Van Lith	Addition Financial Arena (1,796); Orlando, FL
December 29, 2024*; 2:00 p.m., ESPN+	No. 11	Brown	W 79–47	13–1	17 – Van Lith	14 – Emma-Nnopu	5 – Van Lith	Schollmaier Arena (3,012); Fort Worth, TX
January 1, 2025; 6:30 p.m., ESPN+	No. 11	Colorado	W 63–50	14–1 (2–0)	14 – Tied	10 – Prince	3 – Tied	Schollmaier Arena (2,864); Fort Worth, TX
January 4, 2025; 7:00 p.m., ESPN+	No. 11	Cincinnati	W 81–66	15–1 (3–0)	29 – Conner	6 – Prince	7 – Conner	Schollmaier Arena (3,627); Fort Worth, TX
January 7, 2025; 6:30 p.m., ESPN+	No. 11	at Kansas	W 80–73	16–1 (4–0)	30 – Prince	14 – Prince	6 – Van Lith	Allen Fieldhouse (3,014); Lawrence, KS
January 11, 2025; 6:00 p.m., ESPN+	No. 11	at Texas Tech	W 69–43	17–1 (5–0)	22 – Van Lith	10 – Prince	7 – Van Lith	United Supermarkets Arena (5,465); Lubbock, TX
January 14, 2025; 6:30 p.m., ESPN+	No. 10	UCF	W 90–81	18–1 (6–0)	27 – Prince	7 – Prince	7 – Van Lith	Schollmaier Arena (2,541); Fort Worth, TX
January 17, 2025; 6:30 p.m., ESPN+	No. 10	No. 23 Utah	W 81–73	19–1 (7–0)	23 – Prince	6 – Bigby	6 – Conner	Schollmaier Arena (2,735); Fort Worth, TX
January 22, 2025; 6:30 p.m., ESPN+	No. 9	at Oklahoma State	L 59–60	19–2 (7–1)	22 – Prince	13 – Prince	4 – tied	Gallagher-Iba Arena (3,477); Stillwater, OK
January 26, 2025; 2:00 p.m., ESPN2	No. 9	No. 25 Baylor	W 80–75	20–2 (8–1)	24 – Prince	14 – Prince	3 – Tied	Schollmaier Arena (5,415); Fort Worth, TX
February 2, 2025; 3:00 p.m., FS1	No. 9	at Iowa State	W 82–69	21–2 (9–1)	28 – Van Lith	8 – Merrill	8 – Van Lith	Hilton Coliseum (10,331); Ames, IA
February 5, 2025; 6:30 p.m., ESPN+	No. 9	at No. 12 Kansas State	L 50–59	21–3 (9–2)	14 – Prince	11 – Prince	5 – Van Lith	Bramlage Coliseum (7,477); Manhattan, KS
February 8, 2025; 4:00 p.m., ESPN+	No. 9	Texas Tech	W 63–42	22–3 (10–2)	14 – Roberson	10 – Prince	7 – Hunter	Schollmaier Arena (5,478); Fort Worth, TX
February 11, 2025; 6:30 p.m., ESPN+	No. 11	BYU	W 79–47	23–3 (11–2)	14 – Conner	7 – Tied	6 – Tied	Schollmaier Arena (2,483); Fort Worth, TX
February 16, 2025; 3:00 p.m., ESPN+	No. 11	at Arizona	W 85–73	24–3 (12–2)	22 – Prince	12 – Prince	5 – Tied	McKale Center (7,672); Tucson, AZ
February 19, 2025; 7:30 p.m., ESPN+	No. 10	at Arizona State	W 82–66	25–3 (13–2)	22 – Conner	9 – Prince	7 – Tied	Mullett Arena (2,848); Tempe, AZ
February 23, 2025; 11:00 a.m., ESPN2	No. 10	No. 17 West Virginia	W 71–50	26–3 (14–2)	26 – Van Lith	10 – Emma-Nnopu	6 – Conner	Schollmaier Arena (5,897); Fort Worth, TX
February 26, 2025; 6:30 p.m., ESPN+	No. 10	Houston	W 91–56	27–3 (15–2)	26 – Van Lith	9 – Prince	5 – Tied	Schollmaier Arena (3,126); Fort Worth, TX
March 2, 2025; 5:30 p.m., FS1	No. 10	at No. 17 Baylor	W 51–48	28–3 (16–2)	16 – Prince	19 – Prince	5 – Hunter	Foster Pavilion (7,110); Waco, TX
Big 12 Conference tournament
March 7, 2025; 1:30 p.m., ESPNU	(1) No. 8	vs. (9) Colorado; Quarterfinals	W 69–62	29–3	24 – Van Lith	6 – Prince	5 – Prince	T-Mobile Center (4,886); Kansas City, MO
March 8, 2025; 3:00 p.m., ESPN+	(1) No. 8	vs. (4) No. 16 West Virginia; Semifinals	W 71–65	30–3	19 – Van Lith	16 – Prince	8 – Van Lith	T-Mobile Center; Kansas City, MO
March 9, 2025; 4:00 p.m., ESPN	(1) No. 8	vs. (2) No. 17 Baylor; Championship Game	W 64–59	31–3	20 – Van Lith	14 – Prince	4 – Prince	T-Mobile Center (5,084); Kansas City, MO
NCAA tournament
March 21, 2025*; 2:30 p.m., ESPN2	(2 B3) No. 6	(15 B3) Fairleigh Dickinson; First Round	W 73–51	32–3	23 – Conner	10 – Prince	7 – Van Lith	Schollmaier Arena (6,464); Fort Worth, TX
March 23, 2025*; 5:00 p.m., ESPN	(2 B3) No. 6	(7 B3) Louisville; Second Round	W 85–70	33–3	23 – Emma-Nnopu	6 – Tied	10 – Van Lith	Schollmaier Arena (7,494); Fort Worth, TX
March 29, 2025*; 12:00 p.m., ABC	(2 B3) No. 6	vs. (3 B3) No. 8 Notre Dame; Sweet Sixteen	W 71–62	34–3	26 – Van Lith	9 – Van Lith	4 – Tied	Legacy Arena (11,433); Birmingham, AL
March 31, 2025*; 6:00 p.m., ESPN	(2 B3) No. 6	vs. (1 B3) No. 5 Texas; Elite Eight	L 47–58	34–4	17 – Van Lith	9 – Prince	3 – Conner	Legacy Arena (12,175); Birmingham, AL
*Non-conference game. ^{#}Rankings from AP poll. (#) Tournament seedings in parentheses. B3=Birmingham 3. All times are in Central.

== Rankings ==
Ranking movements Legend: ██ Increase in ranking ██ Decrease in ranking RV = Received votes
	Week																				
Poll	Pre	1	2	3	4	5	6	7	8	9	10	11	12	13	14	15	16	17	18	19	Final
AP	RV	RV	19	17	9	12	12	11	11	11	10	9	9	9	11	10	10	8	6	6	6
Coaches	RV	RV	24	21	13	15	13	12	12	12	11	9	9	9	9	9	8	7	6	6	6

== See also ==
- 2024–25 TCU Horned Frogs men's basketball team
