= 2024–25 Baylor Bears women's basketball team =

Intercollegiate basketball season

2024–25 Baylor Bears women's basketball

NCAA tournament, Second Round
- Conference: Big 12 Conference

Ranking
- Coaches: No. 18
- AP: No. 18
- Record: 28–8 (15–3 Big 12)
- Head coach: Nicki Collen (4th season)
- Associate head coach: Tony Greene
- Assistant coaches: Tari Cummings; Sadie Edwards
- Home arena: Foster Pavilion

2024–25 Big 12 Conference women's basketball standings
	Conf.				Overall
Team	W		L	PCT	W		L	PCT
No. 6 TCU †	16	–	2	.889	34	–	4	.895
No. 14 Baylor	15	–	3	.833	28	–	8	.778
No. 17 Oklahoma State	14	–	4	.778	25	–	7	.781
No. 16 West Virginia	13	–	5	.722	25	–	8	.758
No. 19 Kansas State	13	–	5	.722	28	–	8	.778
Utah	13	–	5	.722	22	–	9	.710
Iowa State	12	–	6	.667	23	–	12	.657
Arizona	10	–	8	.556	19	–	14	.576
Colorado	9	–	9	.500	21	–	13	.618
Cincinnati	7	–	11	.389	15	–	14	.517
Kansas	6	–	12	.333	16	–	14	.533
BYU	4	–	14	.222	13	–	17	.433
UCF	4	–	14	.222	12	–	18	.400
Texas Tech	4	–	14	.222	19	–	18	.514
Arizona State	3	–	15	.167	10	–	22	.313
Houston	1	–	17	.056	5	–	25	.167
† 2025 Big 12 tournament winner Rankings from AP poll

The 2024–25 Baylor Bears women's basketball team represented Baylor University during the 2024-25 NCAA Division I women's basketball season. The Bears were led by fourth-year head coach Nicki Collen and played their home games at Foster Pavilion in Waco, Texas. The Baylor Bears are competing as a member of the Big 12 Conference.

== Previous season ==
The 2023-24 Baylor Bears women's basketball team finished the 2023-24 season 26–8, 12–6 in Big 12 play good for 5th place. As the 5th seed in the Big 12 tournament, they would beat 12th seed Texas Tech in the Second Round, but would lose the 4th seed Iowa State in the Quarterfinals. As an At-large bit as the 5th seed in the 2024 NCAA Division I women's basketball tournament, they would beat 12th seed Vanderbilt in the first round, 4th seed Virginia Tech in the second round, but would lose to 1st seed USC in the Regional Semifinals.

== Offseason ==
=== Departures ===
Baylor Departures
Name	Number	Pos.	Height	Year	Hometown	Reason for Departure
Denae Fritz	1	G	5'11"	(redshirt) Sophomore	Maryville, TN	Transferred to Texas Tech
Lety Vasconcelos	25	C	6'7"	Freshman	Miguel Calmon, Bahia, Brazil	Transferred to Illinois
Catarina Ferreira	30	G	6'0"	Senior	São Paulo, Brazil	Transferred to Oregon State
Aijha Blackwell	33	G/F	6'0"	Graduate	Berkeley, MO	Graduated
Dre'una Edwards	44	F	6'0"	(redshirt) Graduate	Las Vegas, NV	Graduated

=== Incoming ===
Baylor incoming transfers
Name	Num	Pos.	Height	Year	Hometown	Previous School
Waiata Jennings	7	G	5'9"	Junior	Rotorua, Zealand	Collin College
Aaronette Vonleh	21	C	6'3"	Senior	West Linn, OR	Colorado

=== Recruiting ===
College recruiting information
Name	Hometown	School	Height	Weight	Commit date
Kayla Nelms; F	Miami, Florida	Miami Country Day School	6 ft 1 in (1.85 m)	N/A	
Kayla Nelms; F	Recruit ratings: ESPN: (94)				
Ines Goryanova; PG	Daytona Beach, Florida	DME Academy	5 ft 8 in (1.73 m)	N/A	
Ines Goryanova; PG	Recruit ratings: ESPN: (93)				
Overall recruit ranking:
Note: In many cases, Scout, Rivals, 247Sports, On3, and ESPN may conflict in their listings of height and weight.; In these cases, the average was taken. ESPN grades are on a 100-point scale.; Sources: "2024 Player Commits". ESPN. Archived from the original on December 5, 2023.

== Roster ==
2024–25 Baylor Bears women's basketball team
Players
Coaches

Pos.	#	Name	Height	Year	Previous school	Hometown
G	1	Ines Goryanova	5 ft 8 in (1.73 m)	Fr	DME Academy	Sofia, Bulgaria
G	2	Yaya Felder	5 ft 8 in (1.73 m)	Sr	Ohio	Hartford, CT
F	3	Madison Bartley	6 ft 3 in (1.91 m)	GS	Belmont	Kettering, OH
G	4	Jana Van Gytenbeek	5 ft 7 in (1.7 m)	GS	Stanford	Greenwood Village, CO
G/F	5	Darianna Littlepage-Buggs	6 ft 1 in (1.85 m)	Jr	Classen HS	Edmond, OK
G	7	Waiata Jennings	5 ft 9 in (1.75 m)	Jr	Collin College	Rotorua, New Zealand
F	8	Kayla Nelms	6 ft 1 in (1.85 m)	Fr	Miami Country Day HS	Miami, FL
G	11	Jada Walker	5 ft 7 in (1.7 m)	Sr	Kentucky	Richmond, VA
F	12	Kyla Abraham	6 ft 3 in (1.91 m)	Jr	Smithfield HS	Carrollton, VA
C	21	Aaronette Vonleh	6 ft 3 in (1.91 m)	Sr	Colorado	West Linn, OR
G/F	22	Bella Fontleroy	6 ft 0 in (1.83 m)	Jr	Kickapoo HS	Springfield, MO
G	24	Sarah Andrews	5 ft 6 in (1.68 m)	GS	MacArthur HS	Irving, TX

Head coach

- Nicki Collen (Marquette)

Assistant coach(es)

- Tony Greene (Langston)
- Tari Cummings (Oklahoma State)
- Sadie Edwards (USC)

Legend

- (C) Team captain
- (S) Suspended
- (I) Ineligible
- (W) Walk-on
- Injured
- Current redshirt

Roster

== Schedule ==
Date time, TV	Rank^{#}	Opponent^{#}	Result	Record	Site (attendance) city, state
Exhibition
November 3, 2024*; 2:00 p.m.	No. 12	Langston	W 100–39	--	Foster Pavilion; Waco, Texas
Regular season
November 7, 2024*; 7:00 p.m., ESPN+	No. 12	Incarnate Word	W 85–33	1–0	Foster Pavilion (3,332); Waco, Texas
November 10, 2024*; 7:00 p.m., ESPN+	No. 12	at Oregon	L 74–76	1–1	Matthew Knight Arena (6,372); Eugene, Oregon
November 14, 2024*; 7:00 p.m., ESPN+	No. 17	East Texas A&M	W 104–55	2–1	Foster Pavilion (3,510); Waco, Texas
November 17, 2024*; 1:00 p.m., ESPN+	No. 17	Texas A&M–Corpus Christi	W 65–42	3–1	Foster Pavilion (3,435); Waco, Texas
November 23, 2024*; 12:30 p.m., FloHoops	No. 18	vs. Southern Miss; Battle 4 Atlantis quarterfinals	W 101–55	4–1	Imperial Arena (990); Paradise Island, Bahamas
November 24, 2024*; 12:30 p.m., FloHoops	No. 18	vs. Indiana; Battle 4 Atlantis Semifinals	L 65–73	4–2	Imperial Arena (179); Paradise Island, Bahamas
November 25, 2024*; 1:30 p.m., ESPNU		vs. Villanova; Battle 4 Atlantis 3rd place game	W 73–62	5–2	Imperial Arena (158); Paradise Island, Bahamas
November 29, 2024*; 2:00 p.m., ESPN+		New Orleans	W 84–58	6–2	Foster Pavilion (3,406); Waco, Texas
December 1, 2024*; 2:00 p.m., ESPN+		Louisiana Tech	W 98–54	7–2	Foster Pavilion (3,621); Waco, Texas
December 4, 2024*; 7:00 p.m., ESPN+		Texas Southern	W 101–29	8–2	Foster Pavilion (3,121); Waco, Texas
December 8, 2024*; 2:00 p.m., ESPN+		UNLV	W 71–64	9–2	Foster Pavilion (3,972); Waco, Texas
December 18, 2024*; 11:00 a.m., ESPN+		Utah Tech	W 97–34	10–2	Foster Pavilion (6,149); Waco, Texas
December 21, 2024; 4:00 p.m., ESPN+		at Kansas	W 86–66	11–2 (1–0)	Allen Fieldhouse (3,935); Lawrence, Kansas
January 1, 2025; 3:00 p.m., ESPN+		Oklahoma State	L 61–84	11–3 (1–1)	Foster Pavilion (3,546); Waco, Texas
January 4, 2025; 2:00 p.m., ESPN+		Colorado	W 76–62	12–3 (2–1)	Foster Pavilion (3,764); Waco, Texas
January 8, 2025; 7:00 p.m., ESPN+		at Arizona	W 81–76 ^{OT}	13–3 (3–1)	McKale Center (6,398); Tucson, Arizona
January 11, 2025; 4:30 p.m., ESPN+		at Arizona State	W 78–59	14–3 (4–1)	Desert Financial Arena; Tempe, Arizona
January 14, 2025; 7:00 p.m., ESPN+		No. 23 Utah	W 70–61	15–3 (5–1)	Foster Pavilion (3,216); Waco, Texas
January 17, 2025; 7:00 p.m., ESPN+		Houston	W 70–51	16–3 (6–1)	Foster Pavilion (3,321); Waco, Texas
January 20, 2025*; 2:00 p.m., FOX	No. 25	vs. No. 1 UCLA; Coretta Scott King Classic	L 57–72	16–4	Prudential Center (6,147); Newark, New Jersey
January 26, 2025; 2:00 p.m., ESPN2	No. 25	at No. 9 TCU	L 75–80	16–5 (6–2)	Schollmaier Arena (5,415); Fort Worth, Texas
January 29, 2025; 6:00 p.m., ESPN+		at UCF	W 75–64	17–5 (7–2)	Addition Financial Arena (1,354); Orlando, Florida
February 2, 2025; 2:00 p.m., ESPN+		Cincinnati	W 98–59	18–5 (8–2)	Foster Pavilion (3,897); Waco, Texas
February 5, 2025; 7:00 p.m., ESPN+		at Houston	W 92–47	19–5 (9–2)	Fertitta Center (1,187); Houston, Texas
February 8, 2025; 7:00 p.m., ESPN+		BYU	W 83–71	20–5 (10–2)	Foster Pavilion (3,960); Waco, Texas
February 11, 2025; 7:00 p.m., ESPN+	No. 25	No. 18 West Virginia	W 75–65	21–5 (11–2)	Foster Pavilion (3,441); Waco, Texas
February 15, 2025; 2:00 p.m., ESPN+	No. 25	at Texas Tech	W 66–60	22–5 (12–2)	United Supermarkets Arena (4,648); Lubbock, Texas
February 19, 2025; 8:00 p.m., ESPN+	No. 19	at Colorado	W 84–62	23–5 (13–2)	CU Events Center (3,182); Boulder, Colorado
February 22, 2025; 1:30 p.m., FOX	No. 19	Iowa State	W 67–52	24–5 (14–2)	Foster Pavilion (4,707); Waco, Texas
February 24, 2025; 6:00 p.m., ESPN2	No. 17	at No. 14 Kansas State	W 79–62	25–5 (15–2)	Bramlage Coliseum (5,200); Manhattan, Kansas
March 2, 2025; 5:30 p.m., FS1	No. 17	No. 10 TCU; Senior Night	L 48–51	25–6 (15–3)	Foster Pavilion (7,110); Waco, Texas
Big 12 Conference Tournament
March 7, 2025; 5:30 p.m., ESPN+	(2) No. 17	vs. (7) Iowa State; Quarterfinals	W 69–63	26–6	T-Mobile Center; Kansas City, Missouri
March 8, 2025; 5:30 p.m., ESPN+	(2) No. 17	vs. (3) No. 21 Oklahoma State; Semifinals	W 84–74	27–6	T-Mobile Center (5,699); Kansas City, Missouri
March 9, 2025; 5:30 p.m., ESPN	(2) No. 17	vs. (1) No. 8 TCU; Championship Game	L 59–64	27–7	T-Mobile Center (5,084); Kansas City, Missouri
NCAA Tournament
March 21, 2025; 2:30 p.m., ESPNU	(4 S1) No. 14	(13 S1) Grand Canyon; First Round	W 73–60	28–7	Foster Pavilion; Waco, TX
March 23, 2025; 3:00 p.m., ESPN	(4 S1) No. 14	(5 S1) No. 25 Ole Miss; Second Round	L 63–69	28–8	Foster Pavilion (3,772); Waco, TX
*Non-conference game. ^{#}Rankings from AP Poll. (#) Tournament seedings in parentheses. S1=Spokane 1. All times are in Central Time.

== Rankings ==
Ranking movements Legend: ██ Increase in ranking ██ Decrease in ranking — = Not ranked RV = Received votes т = Tied with team above or below
	Week																				
Poll	Pre	1	2	3	4	5	6	7	8	9	10	11	12	13	14	15	16	17	18	19	Final
AP	12	17	18	RV	RV	RV	—	RV	RV	—	RV	25	RV	RV	25	19	17	17	14	14	18
Coaches	12	17	17	22	23	21	21	23	24	RV	24	23	RV	RV	RV	22	18	18	16	15т	18

== See also ==
- 2024–25 Baylor Bears men's basketball team
