= 2024–25 Cincinnati Bearcats women's basketball team =

American college basketball season

2024–25 Cincinnati Bearcats women's basketball
- Conference: Big 12 Conference
- Record: 15–14 (7–11 Big 12)
- Head coach: Katrina Merriweather (2nd season)
- Assistant coaches: Ashley Barlow; Abby Jump; Kabrina Merriweather
- Home arena: Fifth Third Arena

2024–25 Big 12 Conference women's basketball standings
	Conf.				Overall
Team	W		L	PCT	W		L	PCT
No. 6 TCU †	16	–	2	.889	34	–	4	.895
No. 14 Baylor	15	–	3	.833	28	–	8	.778
No. 17 Oklahoma State	14	–	4	.778	25	–	7	.781
No. 16 West Virginia	13	–	5	.722	25	–	8	.758
No. 19 Kansas State	13	–	5	.722	28	–	8	.778
Utah	13	–	5	.722	22	–	9	.710
Iowa State	12	–	6	.667	23	–	12	.657
Arizona	10	–	8	.556	19	–	14	.576
Colorado	9	–	9	.500	21	–	13	.618
Cincinnati	7	–	11	.389	15	–	14	.517
Kansas	6	–	12	.333	16	–	14	.533
BYU	4	–	14	.222	13	–	17	.433
UCF	4	–	14	.222	12	–	18	.400
Texas Tech	4	–	14	.222	19	–	18	.514
Arizona State	3	–	15	.167	10	–	22	.313
Houston	1	–	17	.056	5	–	25	.167
† 2025 Big 12 tournament winner Rankings from AP poll

The 2024–25 Cincinnati Bearcats women's basketball team represented the University of Cincinnati during the 2024–25 NCAA Division I women's basketball season. The Bearcats, led by second-year head coach Katrina Merriweather, played their home games at the Fifth Third Arena as members of the Big 12 Conference.

== Previous season ==
The Bearcats finished the 2022–23 season 14–18, 5–13 in Big 12 play to finish in a three-way tie for eleventh place. As a No. 11 seed in the Big 12 women's tournament, they defeated UCF in the first round before losing to West Virginia. They received an at-large bid to the WNIT, where they lost in the first round to Purdue Fort Wayne.

== Offseason ==
=== Departures ===
Cincinnati departures
Name	Number	Pos.	Height	Year	Hometown	Reason for departure
Nia Clark	1	G	5'9"	Graduate student	Indianapolis, IN	Graduated
Braylyn Milton	5	G	5'11"	Junior	Charlotte, NC	Transferred to East Tennessee State
Ta'Ziah Jenks	11	G	6'0"	(redshirt) Junior	Louisville, KY	Transferred to Florida Atlantic
Malea Williams	22	F	6'4"	Senior	Georgetown, KY	Transferred to Florida State
Mya Jackson	23	G	5'7"	Graduate student	Wilmington, OH	Graduated
Clarissa Craig	42	F/C	6'3"	Junior	Cincinnati, OH	Transferred to New Mexico

=== Incoming ===
Cincinnati incoming transfers
Name	Num	Pos.	Height	Year	Hometown	Previous school
Tineya Hylton	2	G	5' 7"	Senior	Toronto, ON	Texas A&M
Daylee Dunn	5	G	5'10"	Graduate student	Fresno, CA	Loyola Marymount

==== Recruiting ====
There was no recruiting class of 2024.

==== Recruiting class of 2025 ====
College recruiting (2025)
Name	Hometown	School	Height	Weight	Commit date
Paige Whitted; CG	Memphis, TN	Briarcrest Christian School	5 ft 9 in (1.75 m)	N/A	Oct 27, 2023
Paige Whitted; CG	Recruit ratings: No ratings found				
Joya Crawford; PG	Dyersburg, TN	Dyersburg	5 ft 8 in (1.73 m)	N/A	Dec 12, 2023
Joya Crawford; PG	Recruit ratings: No ratings found				
Darianna Alexander; G	Cincinnati, OH	Purcell Marian	6 ft 1 in (1.85 m)	N/A	Apr 17, 2024
Darianna Alexander; G	Recruit ratings: ESPN: (97)				
Kali Barrett; SF	Bradenton, FL	Cardinal Mooney HS	6 ft 2 in (1.88 m)	N/A	Jul 15, 2024
Kali Barrett; SF	Recruit ratings: 247Sports:				
Caliyah DeVillasee; PG	Owings Mills, MD	Our Lady of Good Counsel	5 ft 7 in (1.70 m)	N/A	Sep 19, 2024
Caliyah DeVillasee; PG	Recruit ratings: 247Sports: ESPN: (93)				
Overall recruit ranking:
Note: In many cases, Scout, Rivals, 247Sports, On3, and ESPN may conflict in their listings of height and weight.; In these cases, the average was taken. ESPN grades are on a 100-point scale.; Sources: "2025 Player Commits". ESPN. Archived from the original on November 25, 2024.

== Roster ==
2024–25 Cincinnati Bearcats women's basketball team
Players
Coaches

Pos.	#	Name	Height	Year	Previous school	Hometown
G	0	Chloe Mann	5 ft 8 in (1.73 m)	Fr	Duncanville	Fort Worth, TX
G	2	Tineya Hylton	5 ft 7 in (1.7 m)	Sr	Royal Crown Academic School; Texas A&M	Toronto, ON
G	3	Reagan Jackson	5 ft 8 in (1.73 m)	So	Kennedale	Kennedale, TX
G	5	Daylee Dunn	5 ft 10 in (1.78 m)	GS	Salesian Prep; Fresno State	San Ramon, CA
G	6	Aïcha Dia	6 ft 0 in (1.83 m)	Jr	Dawson College; Penn State	Montreal, QC
G	7	Abby Holtman	5 ft 10 in (1.78 m)	So	Ryle	Florence, KY
F	10	Brianna Byars	5 ft 11 in (1.8 m)	So	George Rogers Clark	Paris, KY
F	14	Ramiyah Byrd	5 ft 11 in (1.8 m)	RS Fr	Spire Institute and Academy	Colorado Springs, CO
F	20	Jillian Hayes	6 ft 1 in (1.85 m)	GS	Loveland	Cincinnati, OH
F	25	Alliance Ndiba	6 ft 3 in (1.91 m)	RS Jr	Arizona Western College	Lubumbashi, Congo
C	32	Destiny Thomas	6 ft 4 in (1.93 m)	Jr	Jonesboro; Memphis	Jonesboro, AR
C	33	Delaney Snyder	6 ft 5 in (1.96 m)	So	TPLS Christian Academy	Richmond, VA
G	34	A'riel Jackson	5 ft 9 in (1.75 m)	Jr	Bishop Loughlin Memorial	Brooklyn, NY

Head coach

- Katrina Merriweather (Cincinnati)

Assistant coach(es)

- Ashley Barlow (Notre Dame)
- Abby Jump (Wright State)
- Kabrina Merriweather (Florida A&M)

Legend

- (C) Team captain
- (S) Suspended
- (I) Ineligible
- (W) Walk-on
- Injured
- Current redshirt

Roster

== Schedule and results ==
Date time, TV	Rank^{#}	Opponent^{#}	Result	Record	High points	High rebounds	High assists	Site (attendance) city, state
Exhibition
October 27, 2024*; 2:00 p.m.		Thomas More	W 81–41		–	–	–	Fifth Third Arena; Cincinnati, OH
Non-conference regular season
November 5, 2024*; 8:00 p.m., ESPN+		at UIC	W 66–54	1–0	20 – Hylton	11 – Hayes	4 – Hylton	Credit Union 1 Arena (416); Cincinnati, OH
November 10, 2024*; 2:00 p.m., ESPN+		Delaware State	W 83–46	2–0	30 – Hayes	11 – Hayes	6 – Hylton	Fifth Third Arena (1,115); Cincinnati, OH
November 13, 2024*; 6:30 p.m., ESPN+		Davidson	W 68–50	3–0	20 – Tied	11 – Ndiba	6 – Hylton	Fifth Third Arena (822); Cincinnati, OH
November 18, 2024*; 6:30 p.m., ESPN+		Seton Hall	L 68–69	3–1	16 – Hayes	10 – Hayes	4 – Tied	Fifth Third Arena (903); Cincinnati, OH
November 22, 2024*; 5:00 p.m., ESPN+		vs. Georgetown; Atlantic Slam W	W 59–57	4–1	28 – Hayes	11 – Hayes	2 – Tied	Eastlink Centre (902); Charlottetown, PE
November 24, 2024*; 3:00 p.m., ESPN+		vs. Florida Gulf Coast; Atlantic Slam W	L 52–59	4–2	20 – Hylton	8 – Tied	2 – Tied	Eastlink Centre (804); Charlottetown, PE
December 3, 2024*; 11:00 a.m., ESPN+		Central Connecticut	W 78–49	5–2	26 – Hayes	10 – Hayes	3 – Hylton	Fifth Third Arena (3,235); Cincinnati, OH
December 6, 2024*; 6:30 p.m., ESPN+		Western Illinois	W 95–52	6–2	29 – R. Jackson	10 – Hayes	7 – Hylton	Fifth Third Arena (918); Cincinnati, OH
December 15, 2024*; 1:00 p.m., FloSports		at Xavier; Crosstown Shootout	W 60–48	7–2	18 – Hayes	16 – Hayes	3 – R. Jackson	Cintas Center (2,519); Cincinnati, OH
December 18, 2024*; 6:30 p.m., ESPN+		Marshall	W 67–64	8–2	16 – Hylton	8 – Tied	3 – Tied	Fifth Third Arena (1,210); Cincinnati, OH
Big 12 regular season
December 22, 2024; 2:00 p.m., ESPN+		at No. 13 Kansas State	L 59–76	8–3 (0–1)	13 – Mann	7 – Ndiba	4 – A. Jackson	Bramlage Coliseum (7,700); Manhattan, KS
January 1, 2025; 2:00 p.m., ESPN+		BYU	W 72–63	9–3 (1–1)	16 – Hayes	13 – Hayes	4 – A. Jackson	Fifth Third Arena (2,587); Cincinnati, OH
January 4, 2025; 8:00 p.m., ESPN+		at No. 11 TCU	L 66–81	9–4 (1–2)	20 – Hayes	8 – Hayes	4 – A. Jackson	Schollmaier Arena (3,627); Fort Worth, TX
January 8, 2025; 6:30 p.m., ESPN+		Oklahoma State	L 48–64	9–5 (1–3)	15 – A. Jackson	8 – Hayes	3 – Hylton	Fifth Third Arena (701); Cincinnati, OH
January 11, 2025; 2:00 p.m., ESPN+		at UCF	W 68–58	10–5 (2–3)	17 – Hylton	8 – Hayes	1 – Tied	Addition Financial Arena (1,425); Orlando, FL
January 18, 2025; 6:00 p.m., ESPN+		Colorado	W 65–59	11–5 (3–3)	27 – Hylton	12 – Ndiba	2 – Tied	Fifth Third Arena (1,649); Cincinnati, OH
January 22, 2025; 8:00 p.m., ESPN+		at Arizona	L 62–72	11–6 (3–4)	25 – Hylton	13 – Hayes	3 – Tied	McKale Center (6,371); Tucson, AZ
January 25, 2025; 6:00 p.m., ESPN+		at Arizona State	W 73–66	12–6 (4–4)	25 – Hayes	9 – Hayes	5 – Mann	Desert Financial Arena (12,762); Tempe, AZ
January 29, 2025; 6:30 p.m., ESPN+		Houston	W 73–65	13–6 (5–4)	21 – Hayes	18 – Hayes	2 – Tied	Fifth Third Arena (1,495); Cincinnati, OH
February 2, 2025; 3:00 p.m., ESPN+		at Baylor	L 59–98	13–7 (5–5)	26 – Mann	5 – Tied	2 – R. Jackson	Foster Pavilion (3,897); Waco, TX
February 5, 2025; 6:30 p.m., ESPN+		Iowa State	L 52–72	13–8 (5–6)	15 – R. Jackson	6 – Hayes	5 – A. Jackson	Fifth Third Arena (1,841); Cincinnati, OH
February 8, 2025; 12:00 p.m., ESPN+		Kansas	W 78–74 ^{OT}	14–8 (6–6)	21 – Hylton	9 – Hayes	4 – Tied	Fifth Third Arena (1,980); Cincinnati, OH
February 12, 2025; 6:30 p.m., ESPN+		No. 14 Kansas State	L 53–90	14–9 (6–7)	15 – Hayes	15 – Hayes	3 – Mann	Fifth Third Arena (1,126); Cincinnati, OH
February 15, 2025; 2:00 p.m., ESPN+		at No. 18 West Virginia	L 50–69	14–10 (6–8)	20 – Hayes	10 – Hayes	2 – Hylton	WVU Coliseum (5,164); Morgantown, WV
February 19, 2025; 7:00 p.m., ESPN+		at Texas Tech	W 59–56	15–10 (7–8)	21 – Hylton	11 – Hayes	3 – Hylton	United Supermarkets Arena (3,920); Lubbock, TX
February 23, 2025; 2:00 p.m., ESPN+		Utah	L 65–92	15–11 (7–9)	16 – Hylton	5 – Tied	4 – A. Jackson	Fifth Third Arena (2,015); Cincinnati, OH
February 26, 2025; 7:30 p.m., ESPN+		at No. 21 Oklahoma State	L 64–74	15–12 (7–10)	15 – Hayes	11 – Hayes	2 – Tied	Gallagher-Iba Arena (3,039); Stillwater, OK
March 1, 2025; 2:00 p.m., ESPN+		No. 18 West Virginia	L 69–85	15–13 (7–11)	20 – Hayes	8 – Hayes	7 – R. Jackson	Fifth Third Arena (1,957); Cincinnati, OH
Big 12 Conference Tournament
March 5, 2025; 6:30 p.m., ESPN+	(10)	vs. (15) Arizona State; First Round	L 75–82	15–14	24 – R. Jackson	9 – Hayes	7 – Mann	T-Mobile Center; Kansas City, MO
*Non-conference game. ^{#}Rankings from AP Poll. (#) Tournament seedings in parentheses. All times are in Eastern Time.

== See also ==
- 2024–25 Cincinnati Bearcats men's basketball team
