= 2024–25 West Virginia Mountaineers women's basketball team =

Intercollegiate basketball season team

2024–25 West Virginia Mountaineers women's basketball

NCAA tournament, Second Round
- Conference: Big 12 Conference

Ranking
- Coaches: No. 21
- AP: No. 21
- Record: 25–8 (13–5 Big 12)
- Head coach: Mark Kellogg (2nd season)
- Associate head coach: JC Carter
- Assistant coaches: Jessica Grayson; Erin Grant
- Home arena: WVU Coliseum

2024–25 Big 12 Conference women's basketball standings
| | Conf. | | | | Overall |
| Team | W | | L | PCT | W | | L | PCT |
|---|---|---|---|---|---|---|---|---|
| No. 6 TCU † | 16 | – | 2 | .889 | 34 | – | 4 | .895 |
| No. 14 Baylor | 15 | – | 3 | .833 | 28 | – | 8 | .778 |
| No. 17 Oklahoma State | 14 | – | 4 | .778 | 25 | – | 7 | .781 |
| No. 16 West Virginia | 13 | – | 5 | .722 | 25 | – | 8 | .758 |
| No. 19 Kansas State | 13 | – | 5 | .722 | 28 | – | 8 | .778 |
| Utah | 13 | – | 5 | .722 | 22 | – | 9 | .710 |
| Iowa State | 12 | – | 6 | .667 | 23 | – | 12 | .657 |
| Arizona | 10 | – | 8 | .556 | 19 | – | 14 | .576 |
| Colorado | 9 | – | 9 | .500 | 21 | – | 13 | .618 |
| Cincinnati | 7 | – | 11 | .389 | 15 | – | 14 | .517 |
| Kansas | 6 | – | 12 | .333 | 16 | – | 14 | .533 |
| BYU | 4 | – | 14 | .222 | 13 | – | 17 | .433 |
| UCF | 4 | – | 14 | .222 | 12 | – | 18 | .400 |
| Texas Tech | 4 | – | 14 | .222 | 19 | – | 18 | .514 |
| Arizona State | 3 | – | 15 | .167 | 10 | – | 22 | .313 |
| Houston | 1 | – | 17 | .056 | 5 | – | 25 | .167 |
† 2025 Big 12 tournament winner Rankings from AP poll

The 2024–25 West Virginia Mountaineers women's basketball team represented West Virginia University during the 2024–25 NCAA Division I women's basketball season. The Mountaineers were led by second year head coach Mark Kellogg and played their home games at the WVU Coliseum as members of the Big 12 Conference.

== Previous season ==
The Mountaineers finished the 2023–24 season 25–8, 12–6 in Big 12 play to finish in a three-way tie for fourth place. In the Big 12 Tournament as a No. 6 seed, they beat the No. 11 seed Cincinnati, before losing to the No. 3 seed Kansas State in the quarterfinals. They received an at-large bid to the NCAA tournament as a No. 8 seed in the Albany regional 2. They won their first round matchup against the 2023-24 Ivy League champions Princeton 63–53. They were then matched up against regional hosts No. 2 Iowa, where they lost 64–54.

== Offseason ==
=== Departures ===
West Virginia Departures
| Name | Number | Pos. | Height | Year | Hometown | Reason for Departure |
|---|---|---|---|---|---|---|
| Messiah Hunter | 13 | F | 6'2" | (redshirt) Jr | Hopewell, VA | Transferred to Seton Hall |
| Tavy Diggs | 21 | F | 6'1" | GS Senior | Richardson, TX | Graduated |
| Lauren Fields | 23 | G | 5'9" | GS Senior | Shawnee, OK | Graduated |
| Jayla Hemmingway | 00 | G | 5'11" | Senior | Collierville, TN | Graduated |
| Ainhoa Holze | 5 | G | 5'9" | (redshirt) Fr | Martigny, Switzerland | Unknown |

=== Incoming ===
West Virginia incoming transfers
| Name | Num | Pos. | Height | Year | Hometown | Previous School |
|---|---|---|---|---|---|---|
| Sydney Shaw | 5 | G | 5'9" | Junior | Miami, FL | Auburn |
| Célia Riviére | 37 | F | 6'3" | Junior | Paris, France | Northwest Florida State |

==== Recruiting ====
College recruiting information
| Name | Hometown | School | Height | Weight | Commit date |
|---|---|---|---|---|---|
| Destiny Agubata; W | Corona, CA | Santiago High School | 6 ft 0 in (1.83 m) | N/A | |
| Destiny Agubata; W | Recruit ratings: ESPN: (92) | | | | |
| Jordan Thomas; P | Carrollton, TX | Hebron High School | 6 ft 3 in (1.91 m) | N/A | |
| Jordan Thomas; P | Recruit ratings: ESPN: (92) | | | | |
Overall recruit ranking:
Note: In many cases, Scout, Rivals, 247Sports, On3, and ESPN may conflict in their listings of height and weight.; In these cases, the average was taken. ESPN grades are on a 100-point scale.; Sources: "2024 Player Commits". ESPN. Archived from the original on February 20, 2023.

== Roster ==
2024–25 West Virginia Mountaineers women's basketball team
Players
Coaches

| Pos. | # | Name | Height | Year | Previous school | Hometown |
|---|---|---|---|---|---|---|
| G | 2 | Sydney Woodley | 5 ft 8 in (1.73 m) | Sr | Paloma Valley High School; Long Beach State | Menifee, CA |
| G | 4 | Destiny Agubata | 5 ft 11 in (1.8 m) | Fr | Santiago HS | Moreno Valley, CA |
| G | 5 | Sydney Shaw | 5 ft 9 in (1.75 m) | Jr | DME Academy; Auburn | Miami, FL |
| F | 8 | Danelle Arigbabu | 6 ft 4 in (1.93 m) | Sr | Northeastern Oklahoma A&M College | Berlin, Germany |
| G | 10 | Jordan Harrison | 5 ft 6 in (1.68 m) | Jr | Classen SAS; Stephen F. Austin | Oklahoma City, OK |
| G | 11 | JJ Quinerly | 5 ft 8 in (1.73 m) | Sr | Lake Taylor | Norfolk, VA |
| F | 14 | Kylee Blacksten | 6 ft 3 in (1.91 m) | GS | Air Academy; Colorado | Colorado Springs, CO |
| F | 17 | Feryal Defne Atli | 6 ft 3 in (1.91 m) | Fr | Ari College; Cankaya University | Mersin, Turkey |
| G | 22 | Zya Nugent | 5 ft 7 in (1.7 m) | RS Sr | Denison; Stephen F. Austin | Denison, TX |
| F | 23 | Jordan Thomas | 6 ft 3 in (1.91 m) | Fr | Hebron HS | Carrollton, TX |
| G | 24 | Ashala Moseberry | 5 ft 10 in (1.78 m) | RS Jr | Madison East; South Plains College | Madison, WI |
| G | 32 | Kyah Watson | 5 ft 10 in (1.78 m) | RS Sr | Stevens; South Dakota | Rapid City, SD |
| F | 33 | Tirzah Moore | 6 ft 0 in (1.83 m) | Sr | Jones; Oral Roberts | Oklahoma City, OK |
| F | 37 | Célia Riviére | 6 ft 3 in (1.91 m) | Jr | Lattes Montpellier; Northwest Florida State | Paris, France |

Head coach

- Mark Kellogg (Austin College)

Assistant coach(es)

- JC Carter (Southwest Baptist)
- Jessica Grayson (Austin Peay)
- Erin Grant (Texas Tech)

Legend

- (C) Team captain
- (S) Suspended
- (I) Ineligible
- (W) Walk-on
- Injured
- Current redshirt

Roster
Last update: 10/15/2024

== Schedule and results ==
| Date time, TV | Rank^{#} | Opponent^{#} | Result | Record | High points | High rebounds | High assists | Site (attendance) city, state |
Non-conference regular season
| November 5, 2024*; 7:00 p.m., ESPN+ | No. 16 | Towson | W 85–41 | 1–0 | 23 – Harrison | 9 – Watson | 8 – Harrison | WVU Coliseum (2,079); Morgantown, WV |
| November 9, 2024*; 2:00 p.m., ESPN+ | No. 16 | Niagara | W 110–41 | 2–0 | 21 – Harrison | 13 – Watson | 7 – Harrison | WVU Coliseum (3,166); Morgantown, WV |
| November 12, 2024*; 7:00 p.m., ESPN+ | No. 15 | Pittsburgh; Backyard Brawl | W 82–54 | 3–0 | 17 – Quinerly | 8 – Watson | 8 – Harrison | WVU Coliseum (3,614); Morgantown, WV |
| November 15, 2024*; 7:00 p.m., ESPN+ | No. 15 | Texas A&M | W 83–62 | 4–0 | 27 – Quinerly | 8 – Watson | 8 – Harrison | WVU Coliseum (3,714); Morgantown, WV |
| November 19, 2024*; 7:00 p.m., ESPN+ | No. 13 | Bowling Green | W 78–47 | 5–0 | 20 – Harrison | 8 – Watson | 6 – Quinerly | WVU Coliseum (2,772); Morgantown, WV |
| November 22, 2024*; 7:00 p.m., ESPN+ | No. 13 | Lafayette | W 98–28 | 6–0 | 19 – Quinerly | 6 – Tied | 5 – Tied | WVU Coliseum (3,042); Morgantown, WV |
| November 29, 2024*; 1:30 p.m., FloSports | No. 12 | vs. High Point; Gulf Coast Showcase quarterfinals | W 89–54 | 7–0 | 22 – Quinerly | 10 – Thomas | 4 – Quinerly | Hertz Arena (277); Estero, FL |
| November 30, 2024*; 5:00 p.m., FloSports | No. 12 | vs. Boise State; Gulf Coast Showcase semifinals | W 82–47 | 8–0 | 20 – Shaw | 8 – Watson | 5 – Harrison | Hertz Arena (314); Estero, FL |
| December 1, 2024*; 7:30 p.m., FloSports | No. 12 | vs. No. 5 Texas; Gulf Coast Showcase championship game | L 73–78 | 8–1 | 29 – Quinnerly | 5 – Watson | 6 – Harrison | Hertz Arena (457); Estero, FL |
| December 6, 2024*; 10:30 a.m., ESPN+ | No. 15 | East Tennessee State | W 85–40 | 9–1 | 17 – Harrison | 8 – Watson | 5 – Harrison | WVU Coliseum (8,489); Morgantown, WV |
| December 15, 2024*; 2:00 p.m., ESPN2 | No. 15 | at Temple | W 68–46 | 10–1 | 15 – Watson | 10 – Watson | 7 – Harrison | Liacouras Center (1,672); Philadelphia, PA |
Big 12 Conference Regular Season
| December 21, 2024; 8:00 p.m., ESPN+ | No. 14 | at Colorado | L 60–65 | 10–2 (0–1) | 18 – Harrison | 8 – Watson | 5 – Harrison | CU Events Center (3,209); Boulder, CO |
| January 1, 2025; 2:00 p.m., ESPN+ | No. 18 | UCF | W 80–58 | 11–2 (1–1) | 31 – Quinerly | 7 – Blacksten | 6 – Harrison | WVU Coliseum (5,232); Morgantown, WV |
| January 4, 2025; 6:00 p.m., ESPN+ | No. 18 | BYU | W 66–53 | 12–2 (2–1) | 19 – Quinerly | 9 – Watson | 5 – Quinerly | WVU Coliseum (4,066); Morgantown, WV |
| January 8, 2025; 7:00 p.m., ESPN+ | No. 17 | at Texas Tech | W 89–53 | 13–2 (3–1) | 21 – Quinerly | 5 – Harrison | 4 – Quinerly | United Supermarkets Arena (4,222); Lubbock, TX |
| January 11, 2025; 3:00 p.m., ESPN+ | No. 17 | at Oklahoma State | L 57–64 | 13–3 (3–2) | 16 – Blacksten | 7 – Tied | 5 – Harrison | Gallagher-Iba Arena (2,992); Stillwater, OK |
| January 15, 2025; 7:00 p.m., ESPN+ | No. 20 | Colorado | W 73–46 | 14–3 (4–2) | 19 – Tied | 7 – Harrison | 4 – Harrison | WVU Coliseum (3,153); Morgantown, WV |
| January 19, 2025; 1:00 p.m., FOX | No. 20 | Iowa State | W 82–68 | 15–3 (5–2) | 20 – Tied | 11 – Watson | 6 – Harrison | WVU Coliseum (4,444); Morgantown, WV |
| January 22, 2025; 8:30 p.m., ESPN+ | No. 16 | at Arizona State | W 89–59 | 16–3 (6–2) | 29 – Quinerly | 11 – Watson | 8 – Harrison | Desert Financial Arena (1,571); Tempe, AZ |
| January 25, 2025; 8:30 p.m., ESPN+ | No. 16 | at Arizona | L 62–77 | 16–4 (6–3) | 26 – Quinerly | 6 – Watson | 2 – Quinerly | McKale Center (7,773); Tucson, AZ |
| February 1, 2025; 12:00 p.m., ESPNU | No. 21 | No. 24 Oklahoma State | W 54–37 | 17–4 (7–3) | 18 – Shaw | 9 – Watson | 4 – Quinerly | WVU Coliseum (5,247); Morgantown, WV |
| February 5, 2025; 7:00 p.m., ESPN+ | No. 18 | Kansas | W 76–43 | 18–4 (8–3) | 22 – Shaw | 7 – Blacksten | 3 – Tied | WVU Coliseum (3,258); Morgantown, WV |
| February 8, 2025; 3:00 p.m., ESPN+ | No. 18 | at Houston | W 79–51 | 19–4 (9–3) | 20 – Quinerly | 8 – Watson | 6 – Quinerly | Fertitta Center (901); Houston, TX |
| February 11, 2025; 8:00 p.m., ESPN+ | No. 18 | at No. 25 Baylor | L 65–75 | 19–5 (9–4) | 20 – Harrison | 9 – Watson | 4 – Tied | Foster Pavilion (3,441); Waco, TX |
| February 15, 2025; 2:00 p.m., ESPN+ | No. 18 | Cincinnati | W 69–50 | 20–5 (10–4) | 29 – Quinerly | 9 – Watson | 4 – Watson | WVU Coliseum (5,164); Morgantown, WV |
| February 17, 2025; 2:00 p.m., FOX | No. 17 | No. 12 Kansas State | W 70–57 | 21–5 (11–4) | 26 – Quinerly | 15 – Watson | 4 – Tied | WVU Coliseum (4,122); Morgantown, WV |
| February 23, 2025; 12:00 p.m., ESPN2 | No. 17 | at No. 10 TCU | L 50–71 | 21–6 (11–5) | 13 – Quinerly | 5 – Tied | 5 – Harrison | Schollmaier Arena (5,897); Fort Worth, TX |
| February 26, 2025; 7:00 p.m., ESPN+ | No. 18 | Utah | W 75–46 | 22–6 (12–5) | 38 – Quinerly | 8 – Tied | 7 – Harrison | WVU Coliseum (4,471); Morgantown, WV |
| March 1, 2025; 2:00 p.m., ESPN+ | No. 18 | at Cincinnati | W 85–69 | 23–6 (13–5) | 31 – Quinnerly | 8 – Thomas | 7 – Quinnerly | Fifth Third Arena (1,957); Cincinnati, OH |
Big 12 Conference Tournament
| March 7, 2025; 12:00 p.m., ESPNU | (4) No. 16 | vs. (5) No. 20 Kansas State; Quarterfinals | W 73–69 | 24–6 | 24 – Quinnerly | 7 – Watson | 2 – Quinnerly | T-Mobile Center; Kansas City, MO |
| March 8, 2025; 3:00 p.m., ESPN+ | (4) No. 16 | vs. (1) No. 8 TCU; Semifinals | L 65–71 | 24–7 | 20 – Quinerly | 7 – Shaw | 4 – Harrison | T-Mobile Center; Kansas City, MO |
NCAA Women's Tournament
| March 22, 2025*; 2:00 p.m., ESPNews | (6 B3) No. 16 | vs. (11 B3) Columbia; First Round | W 78–59 | 25–7 | 27 – Quinerly | 9 – Thomas | 7 – Quinerly | Carmichael Arena; Chapel Hill, NC |
| March 24, 2025*; 7:00 p.m., ESPN2 | (2 B3) No. 16 | at (7 B3) No. 12 North Carolina; Second Round | L 47–58 | 25–8 | 10 – Harrison | 15 – Watson | 3 – Quinerly | Carmichael Arena (4,271); Chapel Hill, NC |
*Non-conference game. ^{#}Rankings from AP Poll. (#) Tournament seedings in parentheses. B2=Birmingham 2. All times are in Eastern Time.

== Rankings ==
Ranking movements Legend: ██ Increase in ranking ██ Decrease in ranking т = Tied with team above or below
| | Week | | | | | | | | | | | | | | | | | | | | |
| Poll | Pre | 1 | 2 | 3 | 4 | 5 | 6 | 7 | 8 | 9 | 10 | 11 | 12 | 13 | 14 | 15 | 16 | 17 | 18 | 19 | Final |
|---|---|---|---|---|---|---|---|---|---|---|---|---|---|---|---|---|---|---|---|---|---|
| AP | 16 | 15 | 13 | 12 | 15 | 15 | 14 | 18 | 18 | 17 | 20 | 16 | 21 | 18 | 18 | 17 | 18 | 16 | 16 | 16 | Not released |
| Coaches | 15 | 13 | 12 | 10 | 14 | 13 | 14 | 18 | 18 | 17 | 20 | 16 | 20 | 18 | 18 | 17 | 19 | 16 | 15 | 15т | |

== See also ==
- 2024-25 West Virginia Mountaineers men's basketball team
