= 2024–25 Kansas Jayhawks women's basketball team =

Intercollegiate basketball season team

2024–25 Kansas Jayhawks women's basketball

Paradise Jam Island Division champions
- Conference: Big 12 Conference
- Record: 16–14 (6–12 Big 12)
- Head coach: Brandon Schneider (10th season)
- Assistant coaches: Morgan Paige; Karyla Knight; Brock McGinnis; Marqu'es Webb; Patrick Schrater
- Home arena: Allen Fieldhouse

2024–25 Big 12 Conference women's basketball standings
	Conf.				Overall
Team	W		L	PCT	W		L	PCT
No. 6 TCU †	16	–	2	.889	34	–	4	.895
No. 14 Baylor	15	–	3	.833	28	–	8	.778
No. 17 Oklahoma State	14	–	4	.778	25	–	7	.781
No. 16 West Virginia	13	–	5	.722	25	–	8	.758
No. 19 Kansas State	13	–	5	.722	28	–	8	.778
Utah	13	–	5	.722	22	–	9	.710
Iowa State	12	–	6	.667	23	–	12	.657
Arizona	10	–	8	.556	19	–	14	.576
Colorado	9	–	9	.500	21	–	13	.618
Cincinnati	7	–	11	.389	15	–	14	.517
Kansas	6	–	12	.333	16	–	14	.533
BYU	4	–	14	.222	13	–	17	.433
UCF	4	–	14	.222	12	–	18	.400
Texas Tech	4	–	14	.222	19	–	18	.514
Arizona State	3	–	15	.167	10	–	22	.313
Houston	1	–	17	.056	5	–	25	.167
† 2025 Big 12 tournament winner Rankings from AP poll

The 2024–25 Kansas Jayhawks women's basketball team represented the University of Kansas during the 2024–25 NCAA Division I women's basketball season. The Jayhawks were led by tenth-year head coach Brandon Schneider and played their home games at the Allen Fieldhouse as a member of the Big 12 Conference.

== Previous season ==
The Jayhawks finished the season 20–13, 11–7 in Big 12 play to finish in 7th place. As the 7th seed in the Big 12 tournament, they defeated 10th seed BYU in the second round, but lost to 2nd seed Texas in the quarterfinals. As an at-large bid and the 8th seed in the NCAA Women's Tournament, they beat 9th seed Michigan in overtime in the first round, but lost to 1st seed USC, ending their season.

== Offseason ==
=== Departures ===
Kansas departures
Name	Num	Pos.	Height	Year	Hometown	Reason for departure
Taiyanna Jackson	1	C	6'6"	Graduate student	East Chicago, IN	Graduated/2024 WNBA draft; selected 19th overall by Connecticut Sun
Ryan Cobbins	5	G/F	6'0"	Graduate student	Kansas City, KS	Graduated
Paris Gaines	7	G	6'3"	Freshman	Orlando, FL	Transferred to Georgia Southern
Holly Kersgieter	13	G	5'10"	Graduate student	Sand Springs, OK	Graduated
Zakiyah Franklin	15	G	5'8"	Graduate student	Lakeland, FL	Graduated
Zsófia Telegdy	23	F	6'3"	Sophomore	Budapest, Hungary	Transferred to Western Kentucky
Skyler Gill	32	G/F	5'10"	Junior	Wichita, KS	Transferred to Florida Gulf Coast

=== Incoming transfers ===
Kansas incoming transfers
Name	Num	Pos.	Height	Year	Hometown	Previous school
Freddie Wallace	10	F	6'2"	Junior	Lincoln, NE	Butler CC
Elle Evans	21	G	6'3"	Junior	Edwardsville, IL	North Dakota State
Sania Copeland	22	G	5'7"	Junior	Kansas City, KS	Wisconsin
Brittany Harshaw	23	G	6'1"	(redshirt) Sophomore	Andover, KS	Creighton
Jordan Webster	32	G	5'10"	Graduate student	Dallas, TX	UC Riverside

=== 2024 recruiting class ===
There were no recruiting class of 2024.

=== 2025 recruiting class ===
College recruiting (2025)
Name	Hometown	School	Height	Weight	Commit date
Libby Fandel; G	Cedar Rapids, IA	Xavier High School	6 ft 0 in (1.83 m)	N/A	
Libby Fandel; G	Recruit ratings: ESPN: (94)				
Overall recruit ranking:
Note: In many cases, Scout, Rivals, 247Sports, On3, and ESPN may conflict in their listings of height and weight.; In these cases, the average was taken. ESPN grades are on a 100-point scale.; Sources: "2025 Player Commits". ESPN. Archived from the original on November 15, 2024.

== Roster ==
2024–25 Kansas Jayhawks women's basketball team
Players
Coaches

Pos.	#	Name	Height	Year	Hometown
G	0	Wyvette Mayberry	5 ft 7 in (1.7 m)	GS	Tulsa, OK
G	6	Laia Conesa	5 ft 11 in (1.8 m)	So	Barcelona, Spain
F	10	Freddie Wallace	6 ft 2 in (1.88 m)	Jr	Lincoln, NE
G	12	S'Mya Nichols	6 ft 0 in (1.83 m)	So	Overland Park, KS
C	14	Danai Papadopoulou	6 ft 4 in (1.93 m)	Sr	Thessaloniki, Greece
G	15	Zoe Canfield	5 ft 11 in (1.8 m)	Fr	Topeka, KS
G	16	Carla Osma	6 ft 0 in (1.83 m)	Fr	Madrid, Spain
G	21	Elle Evans	6 ft 3 in (1.91 m)	Jr	Edwardsville, IL
G	22	Sania Copeland	5 ft 7 in (1.7 m)	Jr	Kansas City, KS
G	23	Brittany Harshaw	6 ft 1 in (1.85 m)	RS So	Andover, KS
F	24	Regan Williams	6 ft 3 in (1.91 m)	Fr	Kansas City, MO
F	25	McKenzie Smith	6 ft 0 in (1.83 m)	So	Amarillo, TX
G	32	Jordan Webster	5 ft 10 in (1.78 m)	GS	Dallas, TX
C	33	Nadira Eltayeb	6 ft 4 in (1.93 m)	RS Sr	Seattle, WA

Head coach

- Brandon Schneider (Wayland Baptist)

Assistant coach(es)

- Morgan Paige (Wisconsin)
- Karyla Knight (Alabama)
- Brock McGinnis (Ottawa)
- Marqu'es Webb (Vanderbilt)
- Patrick Schrater (Kansas)

Legend

- (C) Team captain
- (S) Suspended
- (I) Ineligible
- (W) Walk-on
- Injured
- Current redshirt

Roster

== Schedule and results ==
Date time, TV	Rank^{#}	Opponent^{#}	Result	Record	High points	High rebounds	High assists	Site (attendance) city, state
Exhibition
November 1, 2024*; 6:30 p.m., ESPN+		Washburn	W 81–54		20 – Harshaw	10 – Williams	4 – Nichols	Allen Fieldhouse (1,036); Lawrence, KS
Non-conference regular season
November 6, 2024*; 6:30 p.m., ESPN+		Lindenwood	W 56–43	1–0	20 – Nichols	9 – Harshaw	5 – Nichols	Allen Fieldhouse (3,588); Lawrence, KS
November 11, 2024*; 6:30 p.m., ESPN+		Sam Houston	W 66–51	2–0	16 – Nichols	9 – Harshaw	5 – Nichols	Allen Fieldhouse (2,907); Lawrence, KS
November 14, 2024*; 6:30 p.m., ESPN+		Omaha	W 75–56	3–0	16 – Nichols	8 – Eltayeb	9 – Nichols	Allen Fieldhouse (2,794); Lawrence, KS
November 17, 2024*; 2:00 p.m., ESPN+		North Alabama	W 81–64	4–0	21 – Evans	7 – Evans	3 – Tied	Allen Fieldhouse (3,229); Lawrence, KS
November 20, 2024*; 6:00 p.m., BTN		vs. Iowa	L 58–71	4–1	26 – Nichols	6 – Eltayeb	4 – Nichols	Sanford Pentagon (3,347); Sioux Falls, SD
November 28, 2024*; 11:30 a.m., ESPN+		vs. Pittsburgh; Paradise Jam Island Division	W 59–53	5–1	28 – Nichols	8 – Omsa	3 – Evans	Sports and Fitness Center; Saint Thomas, USVI
November 29, 2024*; 2:00 p.m., ESPN+		vs. Northern Iowa; Paradise Jam Island Division	W 76–73	6–1	25 – Nichols	7 – Williams	7 – Nichols	Sports and Fitness Center (625); Saint Thomas, USVI
November 30, 2024*; 2:00 p.m., ESPN+		vs. Auburn; Paradise Jam Island Division	W 61–60	7–1	28 – Nichols	9 – Williams	4 – Nichols	Sports and Fitness Center (1,368); Saint Thomas, USVI
December 5, 2024*; 6:30 p.m., ESPN+		Wichita State	W 70–60	8–1	19 – Nichols	11 – Williams	4 – Mayberry	Allen Fieldhouse (3,201); Lawrence, KS
December 11, 2024*; 6:00 p.m., ESPN+		Kansas City	W 79–49	9–1	17 – Copeland	16 – Williams	9 – Nichols	Allen Fieldhouse (3,004); Lawrence, KS
December 15, 2024*; 2:00 p.m., ESPNU		Penn State	W 68–65	10–1	26 – Nichols	7 – Papadopoulou	5 – Nichols	Allen Fieldhouse (3,527); Lawrence, KS
Big 12 Conference regular season
December 21, 2024; 4:00 p.m., ESPN+		Baylor	L 66–86	10–2 (0–1)	25 – Nichols	7 – Tied	5 – Nichols	Allen Fieldhouse (3,935); Lawrence, KS
January 1, 2025; 2:00 p.m., ESPN+		at Iowa State	L 64–78	10–3 (0–2)	22 – Nichols	5 – Eltayeb	5 – Nichols	Hilton Coliseum (10,807); Ames, IA
January 4, 2025; 2:00 p.m., ESPN+		at Oklahoma State	W 75–66	11–3 (1–2)	27 – Nichols	6 – Evans	7 – Nichols	Gallagher-Iba Arena (3,390); Stillwater, OK
January 7, 2025; 6:30 p.m., ESPN+		No. 11 TCU	L 73–80	11–4 (1–3)	24 – Nichols	7 – Eltayeb	4 – Nichols	Allen Fieldhouse (3,014); Lawrence, KS
January 11, 2025; 2:00 p.m., ESPN+		at Colorado	L 76–84	11–5 (1–4)	28 – Evans	4 – Osma	6 – Nichols	CU Events Center (4,562); Boulder, CO
January 16, 2025; 6:30 p.m., ESPN+		Arizona State	W 75–52	12–5 (2–4)	22 – Evans	8 – Williams	4 – Tied	Allen Fieldhouse (3,020); Lawrence, KS
January 19, 2025; 2:00 p.m., ESPN+		Arizona	L 59–74	12–6 (2–5)	21 – Nichols	7 – Evans	2 – Conesa	Allen Fieldhouse (4,049); Lawrence, KS
January 22, 2025; 8:00 p.m., ESPN+		at Utah	L 61–79	12–7 (2–6)	26 – Nichols	8 – Conesa	4 – Copeland	Jon M. Huntsman Center (3,531); Salt Lake City, UT
January 25, 2025; 2:00 p.m., ESPN+		at Houston	W 57–43	13–7 (3–6)	16 – Nichols	10 – Tied	6 – Nichols	Fertitta Center (1,405); Houston, TX
January 29, 2025; 6:30 p.m., ESPN+		Texas Tech	W 57–50	14–7 (4–6)	20 – Nichols	7 – Evans	6 – Nichols	Allen Fieldhouse (3,076); Lawrence, KS
February 2, 2025; 2:00 p.m., ESPN+		No. 11 Kansas State; Sunflower Showdown	L 64–91	14–8 (4–7)	17 – Copeland	6 – Copeland	7 – Nichols	Allen Fieldhouse (8,180); Lawrence, KS
February 5, 2025; 6:00 p.m., ESPN+		at No. 18 West Virginia	L 43–76	14–9 (4–8)	12 – Nichols	4 – Tied	3 – Nichols	WVU Coliseum (3,258); Morgantown, WV
February 8, 2025; 11:00 a.m., ESPN+		at Cincinnati	L 74–78 ^{OT}	14–10 (4–9)	30 – Evans	6 – Conesa	4 – Nichols	Fifth Third Arena (1,980); Cincinnati, OH
February 15, 2025; 4:00 p.m., ESPN+		Iowa State	L 80–93	14–11 (4–10)	26 – Harshaw	6 – Tied	12 – Nichols	Allen Fieldhouse (4,613); Lawrence, KS
February 18, 2025; 6:30 p.m., ESPN+		UCF	W 63–58	15–11 (5–10)	20 – Nichols	7 – Eltayeb	3 – Nichols	Allen Fieldhouse (1,937); Lawrence, KS
February 22, 2025; 4:00 p.m., ESPN+		at No. 12 Kansas State; Sunflower Showdown	L 60–90	15–12 (5–11)	15 – Evans	5 – Tied	5 – Copeland	Bramlage Coliseum (11,010); Manhattan, KS
February 25, 2025; 8:00 p.m., ESPN+		at BYU	W 71–66	16–12 (6–11)	24 – Evans	8 – Nichols	7 – Nichols	Marriott Center (2,149); Provo, UT
March 2, 2025; 2:00 p.m., ESPN+		No. 21 Oklahoma State	L 51–57	16–13 (6–12)	16 – Nichols	8 – Conesa	6 – Conesa	Allen Fieldhouse (4,838); Lawrence, KS
Big 12 Conference Tournament
March 5, 2025; 8:00 p.m., ESPN+	(11)	vs. (14) Texas Tech; First Round	L 53–57	16–14	15 – Harshaw	4 – Tied	3 – Tied	T-Mobile Center (4,374); Kansas City, MO
*Non-conference game. ^{#}Rankings from AP Poll. (#) Tournament seedings in parentheses. All times are in Central Time.

== See also ==
- 2024–25 Kansas Jayhawks men's basketball team
