= 2024–25 Oklahoma State Cowgirls basketball team =

American college basketball season

2024–25 Oklahoma State Cowgirls basketball

NCAA tournament, First Round
- Conference: Big 12 Conference

Ranking
- Coaches: No. 22
- AP: No. 24
- Record: 25–7 (14–4 Big 12)
- Head coach: Jacie Hoyt (3rd season)
- Associate head coach: Jhasmin Player
- Assistant coaches: Ashley Davis; Kelby Jones
- Home arena: Gallagher-Iba Arena

2024–25 Big 12 Conference women's basketball standings
	Conf.				Overall
Team	W		L	PCT	W		L	PCT
No. 6 TCU †	16	–	2	.889	34	–	4	.895
No. 14 Baylor	15	–	3	.833	28	–	8	.778
No. 17 Oklahoma State	14	–	4	.778	25	–	7	.781
No. 16 West Virginia	13	–	5	.722	25	–	8	.758
No. 19 Kansas State	13	–	5	.722	28	–	8	.778
Utah	13	–	5	.722	22	–	9	.710
Iowa State	12	–	6	.667	23	–	12	.657
Arizona	10	–	8	.556	19	–	14	.576
Colorado	9	–	9	.500	21	–	13	.618
Cincinnati	7	–	11	.389	15	–	14	.517
Kansas	6	–	12	.333	16	–	14	.533
BYU	4	–	14	.222	13	–	17	.433
UCF	4	–	14	.222	12	–	18	.400
Texas Tech	4	–	14	.222	19	–	18	.514
Arizona State	3	–	15	.167	10	–	22	.313
Houston	1	–	17	.056	5	–	25	.167
† 2025 Big 12 tournament winner Rankings from AP poll

The 2024–25 Oklahoma State Cowgirls basketball team represented Oklahoma State University during the 2024–25 NCAA Division I women's basketball season. The Cowgirls were led by third-year head coach Jacie Hoyt and played their home games at the Gallagher-Iba Arena in Stillwater, Oklahoma as members of the Big 12 Conference.

== Previous season ==
The Cowgirls finished the 2023–24 season 14–16, 7–11 in Big 12 play, to finish in eighth place. They lost in the second round to TCU in the Big 12 women's tournament.

== Offseason ==
=== Departures ===
Name	Number	Pos.	Height	Year	Hometown	Reason for departure
Quincy Noble	0	G	5' 10"	GS Senior	McKinney, TX	Graduated
Ale'Jah Douglas	1	G	5' 6"	Senior	Omaha, NE	Transferred to Grand Canyon
Kennedy Fauntleroy	2	G	5' 7"	Sophomore	Upper Marlboro, MD	Transferred to Arizona State
Chandler Prater	5	G	5' 11"	(redshirt) Senior	Kansas City, MO	Transferred to Mississippi State
Lior Garzon	12	F	6' 1"	Senior	Ra'anana, Israel	Transferred to Colorado
Hannah Gusters	21	C	6' 5"	Senior	Dallas, TX	Transferred to UCF
Mia Galbraith	22	G	5' 9"	Freshman	Sunshine Coast, Australia	Transferred to Texas State
Brianna Jackson	23	F	6' 3"	GS Senior	Virginia Beach, VA	Transferred to Troy

=== Incoming transfers ===
Name	Number	Pos.	Height	Year	Hometown	Previous school
Micah Gray	3	G	5' 8"	Junior	Oklahoma City, OK	Seton Hall
Stacie Jones	20	F	6' 1"	GS Senior	Kathleen, GA	Mercer
Macey Huard	22	G	6' 2"	Sophomore	Highlands Ranch, CO	Montana
Alexia Smith	25	G	5' 8"	GS Senior	Columbus, OH	Virginia
Ténin Magassa	34	C	6' 5"	GS Senior	Morsang-sur-Orge, France	Rhode Island

==== Recruiting ====
College recruiting information
Name	Hometown	School	Height	Weight	Commit date
Jadyn Wooten; PG	Leawood, KS	Blue Valley High School	5 ft 5 in (1.65 m)	N/A	
Jadyn Wooten; PG	Recruit ratings: ESPN: (92)				
Overall recruit ranking:
Note: In many cases, Scout, Rivals, 247Sports, On3, and ESPN may conflict in their listings of height and weight.; In these cases, the average was taken. ESPN grades are on a 100-point scale.; Sources: "2024 Player Commits". ESPN. Archived from the original on December 11, 2024.

==== Recruiting class of 2025 ====
College recruiting information (2025)
Name	Hometown	School	Height	Weight	Commit date
Lena Girardi; G	Fort Lauderdale, FL	Grandview Prep School	6 ft 0 in (1.83 m)	N/A	
Lena Girardi; G	Recruit ratings: ESPN: (93)				
Overall recruit ranking:
Note: In many cases, Scout, Rivals, 247Sports, On3, and ESPN may conflict in their listings of height and weight.; In these cases, the average was taken. ESPN grades are on a 100-point scale.; Sources: "2025 Player Commits". ESPN. Archived from the original on December 11, 2024.

== Roster ==
2024–25 Oklahoma State Cowgirls women's basketball team
Players
Coaches

Pos.	#	Name	Height	Year	Previous school	Hometown
G	3	Micah Gray	5 ft 8 in (1.73 m)	Jr	Classen SAS; Seton Hall	Oklahoma City, OK
G	4	Anna Gret Asi	5 ft 8 in (1.73 m)	Sr	Tartu University; Arizona	Tartu, Estonia
G	6	Jadyn Wooten	5 ft 6 in (1.68 m)	Fr	Blue Valley High School	Overland Park, KS
F	7	Maria Anis Rodriguez	6 ft 1 in (1.85 m)	Fr	INS Joaquim	Barcelona, Spain
G	11	Rylee Langerman	5 ft 9 in (1.75 m)	GS	Christian Heritage Academy; Arkansas	Del City, OK
G	15	Brenna Butler	5 ft 6 in (1.68 m)	So	Gruver High School	Gruver, TX
F	20	Stacie Jones	6 ft 1 in (1.85 m)	GS	Veterans High School; Mercer	Kathleen, GA
G	21	Kennedy Evans	5 ft 10 in (1.78 m)	Fr	Legion Preparatory Academy	Little Elm, TX
G	22	Macey Huard	6 ft 2 in (1.88 m)	So	Valor Christian High School; Montana	Highlands Ranch, CO
F	24	Praise Egharevba	6 ft 3 in (1.91 m)	RS So	Nottingham Academy	Papenburg, Germany
G	25	Alexia Smith	5 ft 8 in (1.73 m)	GS	Columbus Africentric High School; Virginia	Columbus, OH
G	30	Landry Williams	5 ft 9 in (1.75 m)	Sr	Metro Christian Academy	Tulsa, OK
G	32	Stailee Heard	5 ft 11 in (1.8 m)	So	Sapulpa High School	Sapulpa, OK
C	34	Ténin Magassa	6 ft 6 in (1.98 m)	GS	Jean Moulin High School; Rhode Island	Morsang-sur-Orge, France

Head coach

- Jacie Hoyt (Wichita State)

Assistant coach(es)

- Jhasmin Player (Baylor)
- Ashley Davis (TCU)
- Kelby Jones (North Texas)

Legend

- (C) Team captain
- (S) Suspended
- (I) Ineligible
- (W) Walk-on
- Injured
- Current redshirt

Roster
Last update: January 16, 2025

== Schedule and results ==
Date time, TV	Rank^{#}	Opponent^{#}	Result	Record	High points	High rebounds	High assists	Site (attendance) city, state
Exhibition
October 29, 2024*; 6:30 p.m.		Southern Nazarene	W 81–46		–	–	–	Gallagher-Iba Arena; Stillwater, OK
Non-conference regular season
November 4, 2024*; 5:00 p.m., ESPN+		Arkansas–Pine Bluff	W 96–43	1–0	31 – Huard	10 – Huard	7 – Asl	Gallagher-Iba Arena (1,558); Stillwater, OK
November 7, 2024*; 6:30 p.m., ESPN+		Oral Roberts	W 89–68	2–0	25 – Gray	8 – Heard	6 – Heard	Gallagher-Iba Arena (1,991); Stillwater, OK
November 11, 2024*; 6:30 p.m., ESPN+		Texas Southern	W 87–57	3–0	33 – Asi	6 – tied	5 – Smith	Gallagher-Iba Arena (1,675); Stillwater, OK
November 16, 2024*; 2:00 p.m., ESPN+		Fairfield	W 64–62	4–0	14 – tied	12 – Heard	3 – Heard	Gallagher-Iba Arena (2,176); Stillwater, OK
November 20, 2024*; 11:00 a.m., ESPN+		Central Arkansas	W 89–58	5–0	19 – Gray	8 – tied	4 – Asi	Gallagher-Iba Arena (4,714); Stillwater, OK
November 25, 2024*; 6:30 p.m., ESPN+		Chicago State	W 113–50	6–0	36 – Gray	11 – Heard	7 – Wooten	Gallagher-Iba Arena (2,080); Stillwater, OK
November 29, 2024*; 4:45 p.m., BallerTV		vs. Arkansas; Daytona Beach Classic	W 70–56	7–0	16 – tied	12 – Heard	4 – Wooten	Ocean Center (145); Daytona Beach, FL
November 30, 2024*; 4:45 p.m., BallerTV		vs. Richmond; Daytona Beach Classic	L 53–57	7–1	20 – Wooten	7 – Heard	4 – Wooten	Ocean Center (120); Daytona Beach, FL
December 4, 2024*; 6:30 p.m., ESPN+		Houston Christian	W 93–39	8–1	29 – Heard	10 – tied	6 – Smith	Gallagher-Iba Arena (1,777); Stillwater, OK
December 6, 2024*; 6:30 p.m., ESPN+		Alabama State	W 125–49	9–1	32 – Heard	10 – tied	6 – tied	Gallagher-Iba Arena (1,932); Stillwater, OK
December 16, 2024*; 6:30 p.m., ESPN+		McNeese	W 92–41	10–1	18 – Jones	14 – Jones	6 – Wooten	Gallagher-Iba Arena (2,020); Stillwater, OK
Big 12 regular season
December 21, 2024; 4:00 p.m., ESPN2		Iowa State	W 81–75	11–1 (1–0)	24 – Gray	7 – Smith	5 – Asi	Gallagher-Iba Arena (3,003); Stillwater, OK
January 1, 2025; 3:00 p.m., ESPN+		at Baylor	W 84–61	12–1 (2–0)	16 – Magassa	7 – Asi	4 – tied	Foster Pavilion (3,546); Waco, TX
January 4, 2025; 2:00 p.m., ESPN+		Kansas	L 66–75	12–2 (2–1)	24 – Heard	11 – Heard	4 – Wooten	Gallagher-Iba Arena (3,390); Stillwater, OK
January 8, 2025; 5:30 p.m., ESPN+		at Cincinnati	W 64–48	13–2 (3–1)	21 – Heard	13 – Heard	4 – Heard	Fifth Third Arena (701); Cincinnati, OH
January 11, 2025; 2:00 p.m., ESPN+		No. 17 West Virginia	W 64–57	14–2 (4–1)	18 – Heard	12 – Smith	3 – tied	Gallagher-Iba Arena (2,992); Stillwater, OK
January 14, 2025; 7:00 p.m., ESPN+	No. 24т	at Houston	L 76–79	14–3 (4–2)	17 – Heard	9 – Egharevba	4 – Wooten	Fertitta Center (613); Houston, TX
January 18, 2025; 3:00 p.m., ESPN+	No. 24т	at UCF	W 72–58	15–3 (5–2)	23 – Heard	10 – Heard	5 – Smith	Addition Financial Arena (3,002); Orlando, FL
January 22, 2025; 6:30 p.m., ESPN+		No. 9 TCU	W 60–59	16–3 (6–2)	17 – Heard	6 – Heard	4 – Wooten	Gallagher-Iba Arena (3,477); Stillwater, OK
January 25, 2025; 2:00 p.m., ESPN+		at Texas Tech	W 71–68	17–3 (7–2)	34 – Heard	7 – tied	4 – Wooten	United Supermarkets Arena (4,468); Lubbock, TX
January 29, 2025; 6:30 p.m., ESPN+	No. 24	Arizona State	W 83–71	18–3 (8–2)	28 – Heard	10 – Heard	7 – Wooten	Gallagher-Iba Arena (2,508); Stillwater, OK
February 1, 2025; 11:00 a.m., ESPNU	No. 24	at No. 21 West Virginia	L 37–54	18–4 (8–3)	15 – Smith	11 – Smith	2 – Asi	WVU Coliseum (5,247); Morgantown, WV
February 8, 2025; 2:00 p.m., ESPN+	No. 25	No. 12 Kansas State	W 85–55	19–4 (9–3)	24 – Asi	11 – Heard	6 – Asi	Gallagher-Iba Arena (5,178); Stillwater, OK
February 12, 2025; 6:30 p.m., ESPN+	No. 20	Arizona	W 83–64	20–4 (10–3)	20 – Gray	9 – Heard	5 – Wooten	Gallagher-Iba Arena (2,675); Stillwater, OK
February 15, 2025; 4:00 p.m., ESPN+	No. 20	at BYU	L 64–68	20–5 (10–4)	13 – Tied	7 – Magassa	3 – Asi	Marriott Center (2,939); Provo, UT
February 18, 2025; 8:00 p.m., ESPN+	No. 24	at Utah	W 68–64	21–5 (11–4)	18 – Gray	11 – Egharevba	4 – Asi	Jon M. Huntsman Center (3,882); Salt Lake City, UT
February 22, 2025; 2:00 p.m., ESPN+	No. 24	Colorado	W 82–65	22–5 (12–4)	26 – Heard	7 – Heard	4 – Asi	Gallagher-Iba Arena (4,367); Stillwater, OK
February 26, 2025; 6:30 p.m., ESPN+	No. 21	Cincinnati	W 74–64	23–5 (13–4)	15 – Asi	9 – Tied	4 – Tied	Gallagher-Iba Arena (3,039); Stillwater, OK
March 2, 2025; 2:00 p.m., ESPN+	No. 21	at Kansas	W 57–51	24–5 (14–4)	20 – Magassa	16 – Magassa	2 – Tied	Allen Fieldhouse (4,838); Lawrence, KS
Big 12 Conference tournament
March 7, 2025; 8:00 p.m., ESPN+	(3) No. 21	vs. (14) Texas Tech; Quarterfinals	W 62–59	25–5	34 – Heard	13 – Heard	4 – Wooten	T-Mobile Center (5,681); Kansas City, MO
March 8, 2025; 5:30 p.m., ESPN+	(3) No. 21	vs. (2) No. 17 Baylor; Semifinals	L 74–84	25–6	25 – Heard	12 – Heard	6 – Asi	T-Mobile Center (5,699); Kansas City, MO
NCAA Tournament
March 22, 2025*; 2:30 p.m., ESPN2	(7 S4) No. 17	vs. (10 S4) No. 24 South Dakota State; First Round	L 68–74	25–7	20 – Heard	10 – Heard	8 – Wooten	Harry A. Gampel Pavilion (10,299); Storrs, CT
*Non-conference game. ^{#}Rankings from AP poll. (#) Tournament seedings in parentheses. All times are in Central.

== Rankings ==
Ranking movements Legend: ██ Increase in ranking ██ Decrease in ranking — = Not ranked RV = Received votes т = Tied with team above or below
	Week																				
Poll	Pre	1	2	3	4	5	6	7	8	9	10	11	12	13	14	15	16	17	18	19	Final
AP	—	—	—	—	—	—	RV	RV	RV	RV	24т	RV	24	25	20	24	21	21	17	17	24
Coaches	—	—	—	—	—	—	—	—	—	—	RV	RV	25	RV	23	RV	23	21	20	19	22

== See also ==
- 2024–25 Oklahoma State Cowboys basketball team
