= 2025–26 UCF Knights women's basketball team =

American college basketball season

2025–26 UCF Knights women's basketball
- Conference: Big 12 Conference
- Record: 11–19 (3–15 Big 12)
- Head coach: Sytia Messer (4th season)
- Assistant coaches: Walter Pitts; Steven Key; AnnMarie Gilbert
- Home arena: Addition Financial Arena

2025–26 Big 12 women's basketball standings
	Conf.				Overall
Team	W		L	PCT	W		L	PCT
No. 6 TCU	15	–	3	.833	32	–	6	.842
No. 18 West Virginia †	14	–	4	.778	28	–	7	.800
No. 23 Baylor	13	–	5	.722	25	–	9	.735
Oklahoma State	12	–	6	.667	24	–	10	.706
Texas Tech	12	–	6	.667	26	–	8	.765
Colorado	11	–	7	.611	22	–	12	.647
Iowa State	10	–	8	.556	22	–	10	.688
Utah	10	–	8	.556	19	–	13	.594
BYU	9	–	9	.500	26	–	12	.684
Arizona State	9	–	9	.500	24	–	11	.686
Kansas	8	–	10	.444	22	–	14	.611
Kansas State	8	–	10	.444	19	–	18	.514
Cincinnati	6	–	12	.333	11	–	20	.355
UCF	3	–	15	.167	11	–	19	.367
Arizona	3	–	15	.167	12	–	18	.400
Houston	1	–	17	.056	7	–	23	.233
† 2026 Big 12 tournament winner Rankings from AP poll

The 2025–26 UCF Knights women's basketball team represents the University of Central Florida during the 2025–26 NCAA Division I women's basketball season. The Knights are led by fourth-year head coach Sytia Messer and play their home games at the Addition Financial Arena in Orlando, Florida as members of the Big 12 Conference.

== Previous season ==
The Knights finished the 2024–25 season 12–18, 4–14 in Big 12 play to finish in a three-way tie for twelfth place. As No. 13 seed in the Big 12 tournament they defeated BYU in the first round before losing in the second round to Kansas State.

== Offseason ==
=== Departures ===
Name	Number	Pos.	Height	Year	Hometown	Reason for departure
Kaitlin Peterson	3	G	5'9"	Senior	Eufaula, AL	Transferred to Ole Miss
Lucie Castagne	4	G	5'6"	Graduate Student	Paris, France	Graduated
Nevaeh Brown	8	G	5'9"	Senior	Charlotte, NC	Transferred to Hofstra
Achol Akot	11	F	6'1"	Sophomore	Ottawa, ON	Transferred to Oklahoma State
Emely Rodriguez	12	G/F	6'0"	Freshman	La Romana, DR	Transferred to Iowa
Taylor Gibson	15	F	6'2"	Senior	Upper Marlboro, MD	Transferred to Hampton
Hannah Gusters	21	C	6'6'	Graduate Student	Dallas, TX	Graduated
Adeang Ring	22	F	6'5"	Freshman	Sydney, Australia	Transferred to Virginia
Arek Angui	23	C	6'8"	Freshman	Juba, South Sudan	Transferred to Auburn
Ally Stedman	24	G	5'9"	Senior	Phoenix, AZ	Transferred

=== Incoming transfers ===
Name	Number	Pos.	Height	Year	Hometown	Previous school
Kristol Ayson	2	G	5'8"	Graduate Student	Tacoma, WA	Tulsa
Jaccoriah Bracey	3	G	5'9"	Graduate Student	Drew, MS	Southern Miss
Logan Reed	5	G/F	6'0"	(redshirt) Freshman	Godley, TX	Texas A&M–Corpus Christi
Kayanna Cox	12	G	5'10"	Sophomore	Tenaha, TX	SMU
Audreonia Benson	14	G	5'6"	Junior	Trussville, AL	Pensacola State College
Jasmynne Gibson	24	F	6'1"	Sophomore	Apopka, FL	North Florida
Savannah Scott	30	C	6'4"	(redshirt) Sophomore	Conway, AR	Auburn
Leah Harmon	42	G	5'6"	Sophomore	Paterson, NJ	Miami (FL)

==== Recruiting ====
There was no recruiting class of 2025.

== Roster ==
2025–26 UCF Knights women's basketball team
Players
Coaches

Pos.	#	Name	Height	Year	Previous school	Hometown
G	1	Samari Bankhead	6 ft 0 in (1.83 m)	Fr	Windward	Los Angeles, CA
G	2	Kristol Ayson	5 ft 8 in (1.73 m)	GS	Lincoln; Tulsa	Tacoma, WA
G	3	Jaccoriah Bracey	5 ft 9 in (1.75 m)	GS	Thomas Edwards; Southern Miss	Drew, MS
G/F	5	Logan Reed	6 ft 0 in (1.83 m)	RS Fr	Godley; Texas A&M–Corpus Christi	Godley, TX
G	7	Felicia Schölander	5 ft 9 in (1.75 m)	Fr		Stockholm, Sweden
F	9	Meja Hänsel	6 ft 2 in (1.88 m)	Fr	Luleå High School	Stockholm, Sweden
G	12	Kayanna Cox	5 ft 10 in (1.78 m)	So	Tenaha; SMU	Tenaha, TX
G/F	13	Summer Yancy	5 ft 11 in (1.8 m)	So	Lee's Summit North	Kansas City, MO
G	14	Audreonia Benson	5 ft 7 in (1.7 m)	Jr	Hewitt-Trussville; Pensacola State College	Trussville, AL
F	24	Jasmynne Gibson	6 ft 1 in (1.85 m)	So	Colonial; North Florida	Apopka, FL
C	30	Savannah Scott	6 ft 4 in (1.93 m)	RS So	Conway; Auburn	Conway, AR
F	33	Mahogany Chandler-Robnets	6 ft 2 in (1.88 m)	So	Benson Tech	Portland, OR
C	35	Khyala Ngodu	6 ft 3 in (1.91 m)	Jr	Dillard	Fort Lauderdale, FL
G	42	Leah Harmon	5 ft 6 in (1.68 m)	So	IMG Academy; Miami (FL)	Paterson, NJ

Head coach

- Sytia Messer (Arkansas)

Assistant coach(es)

- Walter Pitts (Alabama)
- Steven Key (Boston University)
- AnnMarie Gilbert (Oberlin)

Legend

- (C) Team captain
- (S) Suspended
- (I) Ineligible
- (W) Walk-on
- Injured
- Current redshirt

Roster

== Schedule and results ==
Date time, TV	Rank^{#}	Opponent^{#}	Result	Record	High points	High rebounds	High assists	Site (attendance) city, state
Exhibition
October 28, 2025*; 7:00 p.m.		Edward Waters	W 66–55		13 – Tied	9 – Ngodu	4 – Harmon	Addition Financial Arena; Orlando, FL
Non-conference regular season
November 3, 2025*; 6:00 p.m., ESPN+		Bethune–Cookman	W 75–36	1–0	14 – Harmon	7 – Bracey	4 – Tied	Addition Financial Arena; Orlando, FL
November 9, 2025*; 2:00 p.m., ESPN+		Charlotte	L 64–66	1–1	17 – Harmon	7 – Ngodu	5 – Harmon	Addition Financial Arena (973); Orlando, FL
November 18, 2025*; 11:00 a.m., ESPN+		FIU	W 79–61	2–1	17 – Bracey	9 – Chandler-Roberts	5 – Harmon	Addition Financial Arena (1,357); Orlando, FL
November 21, 2025*; 7:00 p.m., ESPN+		Florida A&M	W 76–59	3–1	15 – Harmon	8 – Gibson	3 – Harmon, Ayson	Addition Financial Arena (1,074); Orlando, FL
November 24, 2025*; 2:00 p.m., ESPN+		South Carolina State	W 94–49	4–1	17 – Harmon	7 – Tied	3 – Yancy	Addition Financial Arena (1,119); Orlando, FL
November 26, 2025*; 11:00 a.m., FloCollege		vs. East Carolina; Puerto Rico Shootout	W 75–61	5–1	20 – Ngodu	10 – Scott	6 – Harmon	Coliseo Guillermo Angulo (250); San Juan, PR
November 27, 2025*; 12:30 p.m., FloCollege		vs. Wake Forest; Puerto Rico Shootout	L 80–85 ^{OT}	5–2	21 – Ngodu	13 – Ngodu	5 – Harmon	Coliseo Guillermo Angulo (250); San Juan, PR
November 28, 2025*; 3:00 p.m., FloCollege		vs. Rice; Puerto Rico Shootout	W 57–56	6–2	27 – Harmon	8 – Chandler-Roberts	4 – Bracey	Coliseo Guillermo Angulo (250); San Juan, PR
December 3, 2025*; 7:00 p.m., ESPN+		Stetson	L 67–70	6–3	19 – Harmon	8 – Scott	5 – Yancy	Addition Financial Arena (1,021); Orlando, FL
December 7, 2025*; 1:00 p.m., ESPN+		Delaware State	W 74–46	7–3	11 – Tied	7 – Gibson	2 – Tied	Addition Financial Arena (1,236); Orlando, FL
December 14, 2025*; 2:00 p.m., ESPN+		Morgan State	W 78–56	8–3	17 – Tied	8 – Ngodu	3 – Tied	Addition Financial Arena (1,019); Orlando, FL
Big 12 regular season
December 20, 2025; 2:00 p.m., ESPN+		BYU	L 50–71	8–4 (0–1)	16 – Harmon	7 – Ngodu	3 – Yancy	Addition Financial Arena (1,011); Orlando, FL
December 31, 2025; 7:00 p.m., ESPN+		at No. 21 Texas Tech	L 55–73	8–5 (0–2)	15 – Harmon	9 – Chandler-Roberts	3 – Tied	United Supermarkets Arena (5,226); Lubbock, TX
January 4, 2026; 2:00 p.m., ESPN+		Kansas	L 68–83	8–6 (0–3)	38 – Harmon	7 – Chandler-Roberts	2 – Tied	Addition Financial Arena (1,075); Orlando, FL
January 7, 2026; 8:30 p.m., ESPN+		at Arizona State	L 45–68	8–7 (0–4)	8 – Yancy	5 – Tied	3 – Tied	Desert Financial Arena (2,422); Tempe, AZ
January 10, 2026; 4:00 p.m., ESPN+		at Arizona	W 58–55	9–7 (1–4)	22 – Ngodu	13 – Ngodu	5 – Ngodu	McKale Center (5,426); Tucson, AZ
January 14, 2026; 7:00 p.m., ESPN+		Cincinnati	L 59–63 ^{OT}	9–8 (1–5)	29 – Harmon	11 – Ngodu	3 – Yancy	Addition Financial Arena (1,076); Orlando, FL
January 18, 2026; 2:00 p.m., ESPN+		Colorado	W 74–68	10–8 (2–5)	25 – Yancy	6 – Tied	3 – Tied	Addition Financial Arena (1,156); Orlando, FL
January 21, 2026; 8:00 p.m., ESPN+		at No. 14 Baylor	L 48–73	10–9 (2–6)	11 – Ngodu	12 – Ngodu	2 – Tied	Foster Pavilion (3,192); Waco, TX
January 24, 2026; 2:00 p.m., ESPN+		No. 9 TCU	L 50–67	10–10 (2–7)	17 – Chandler-Roberts	9 – Yancy	2 – Tied	Addition Financial Arena (1,256); Orlando, FL
January 31, 2026; 3:00 p.m., ESPN+		at Iowa State	L 52–65	10–11 (2–8)	16 – Bracey	11 – Ngodu	2 – Yancy	Hilton Coliseum (10,125); Ames, IA
February 4, 2026; 7:00 p.m., ESPN+		Utah	L 57–67	10–12 (2–9)	15 – Ayson	9 – Yancy	4 – Yancy	Addition Financial Arena (1,053); Orlando, FL
February 7, 2026; 2:00 p.m., ESPN+		at Oklahoma State	L 58–81	10–13 (2–10)	12 – Tied	10 – Chandler-Roberts	3 – Chandler-Roberts	Gallagher-Iba Arena (2,678); Stillwater, OK
February 11, 2026; 7:00 p.m., ESPN+		at No. 19 West Virginia	L 56–106	10–14 (2–11)	12 – Chandler-Roberts	7 – Chandler-Roberts	3 – Ayson	Hope Coliseum (3,011); Morgantown, WV
February 15, 2026; 2:00 p.m., ESPN+		No. 12 Baylor	L 63–93	10–15 (2–12)	16 – Bankhead	6 – Ngodu	5 – Ayson	Addition Financial Arena (1,329); Orlando, FL
February 18, 2026; 7:00 p.m., ESPN+		Kansas State	L 67–93	10–16 (2–13)	22 – Cox	6 – Chandler-Roberts	3 – Tied	Addition Financial Arena (1,059); Orlando, FL
February 21, 2026; 2:00 p.m., ESPN+		at Cincinnati	L 60–73	10–17 (2–14)	19 – Chandler-Roberts	7 – Tied	4 – Tied	Fifth Third Arena (2,887); Cincinnati, OH
February 25, 2026; 7:00 p.m., ESPN+		No. 17 West Virginia	L 62–74	10–18 (2–15)	21 – Ngodu	9 – Ngodu	4 – Ayson	Addition Financial Arena (1,789); Orlando, FL
March 1, 2026; 3:00 p.m., ESPN+		at Houston	W 72–62	11–18 (3–15)	20 – Ngodu	11 – Chandler-Roberts	4 – Bracey	Fertitta Center (1,103); Houston, TX
Big 12 Conference tournament
March 4, 2026; 9:00 p.m., ESPN+	(14)	vs. (11) Kansas; First Round	L 35–56	11–19	10 – Bracey	10 – Ngodu	2 – Bracey	T-Mobile Center (4,144); Kansas City, MO
*Non-conference game. ^{#}Rankings from AP poll. (#) Tournament seedings in parentheses. All times are in Eastern.

== See also ==
- 2025–26 UCF Knights men's basketball team
