= 2025–26 Arizona State Sun Devils women's basketball team =

American college basketball season

2025–26 Arizona State Sun Devils women's basketball

NCAA tournament, First Four
- Conference: Big 12 Conference
- Record: 24–11 (9–9 Big 12)
- Head coach: Molly Miller (1st season)
- Associate head coach: Stephanie Norman; Jason Glover
- Assistant coaches: Daniel Barber; Abi Olajuwon; Daejah Bernard
- Home arena: Desert Financial Arena

2025–26 Big 12 women's basketball standings
	Conf.				Overall
Team	W		L	PCT	W		L	PCT
No. 6 TCU	15	–	3	.833	32	–	6	.842
No. 18 West Virginia †	14	–	4	.778	28	–	7	.800
No. 23 Baylor	13	–	5	.722	25	–	9	.735
Oklahoma State	12	–	6	.667	24	–	10	.706
Texas Tech	12	–	6	.667	26	–	8	.765
Colorado	11	–	7	.611	22	–	12	.647
Iowa State	10	–	8	.556	22	–	10	.688
Utah	10	–	8	.556	19	–	13	.594
BYU	9	–	9	.500	26	–	12	.684
Arizona State	9	–	9	.500	24	–	11	.686
Kansas	8	–	10	.444	22	–	14	.611
Kansas State	8	–	10	.444	19	–	18	.514
Cincinnati	6	–	12	.333	11	–	20	.355
UCF	3	–	15	.167	11	–	19	.367
Arizona	3	–	15	.167	12	–	18	.400
Houston	1	–	17	.056	7	–	23	.233
† 2026 Big 12 tournament winner Rankings from AP poll

The 2025–26 Arizona State women's basketball team represented Arizona State University during the 2025–26 NCAA Division I women's basketball season. The Sun Devils are led by first-year head coach Molly Miller. They play their home games at the Desert Financial Arena and compete as second year members of the Big 12 Conference.

== Previous season ==
The Sun Devils finished the season 10–22, 3–15 in Big 12 play to finish in fifteenth place. They defeated Cincinnati in the first round of the Big 12 women's tournament before losing to Iowa State in the second round.

Arizona State fired Adair on March 8, 2025, after a 29–62 record in three seasons. Grand Canyon head coach Molly Miller was hired by the Sun Devils on March 22.

== Offseason ==
=== Departures ===
Arizona State departures
Name	Num	Pos.	Height	Year	Hometown	Reason for departure
Kennedy Basham	0	F	6'7"	Junior	Phoenix, AZ	Transferred to TCU
Kadidia Toure	1	F	6'3"	Junior	Silver Spring, MD	Transferred
Tyi Skinner	3	G	5'5"	Graduate student	Washington, D.C.	Transferred to SMU
Jazion Jackson	7	G	5'9"	Graduate student	Dallas, TX	Graduated
Kennedy Fauntleroy	10	G	5'7"	Junior	Upper Marlboro, MD	Transferred to East Carolina
Maggie Besselink	13	G/F	6'3"	Graduate student	Kingston, ON	Graduated
Hanna Miller	21	F	6'2"	Junior	Aberdeen, SD	Transferred to North Dakota
Jalyn Brown	23	G	6'0"	Junior	Baltimore, MD	Transferred to Michigan State
Mallory Miller	24	F	6'4"	Sophomore	Aberdeen, SD	Transferred to Butler
Adison Novosel	25	G	5'11"	Senior	Richfield, OH	Graduated
Morasha Wiggins	30	F	6'0"	Senior	Kalamazoo, MI	Graduated
Nevaeh Parkinson	32	C	6'3"	Graduate student	Dallas, TX	Graduated

=== Incoming transfers ===
Arizona State incoming transfers
Name	Num	Pos.	Height	Year	Hometown	Previous school
Gabby Elliott	0	G	5'10"	Graduate student	Detroit, MI	Penn State
Acacia Hayes	10	G	5'7"	Senior	Murfreesboro, TN	Western Kentucky
Marley Washenitz	11	G	5'7"	Senior	Fairmont, WV	Pittsburgh
Last-Tear Poa	13	G	5'11"	Graduate student	Melbourne, Australia	LSU
Heloisa Carrera	14	F	6'2"	Sophomore	São Paulo, Brazil	Ole Miss
McKinna Brakens	21	F	6'1"	Junior	Fairfield, TX	UNLV
Jordan Jones	23	G	6'0"	Senior	Cheyenne, WY	Denver
Deborah Davenport	24	F	6'2"	(redshirt) Junior	Cincinnati, OH	Northwest Florida State College

==== Recruiting ====
There was no recruiting class of 2025.

== Roster ==
2025–26 Arizona State Sun Devils women's basketball team
Players
Coaches

Pos.	#	Name	Height	Year	Previous school	Hometown
G	0	Gabby Elliott	5 ft 10 in (1.78 m)	GS	Detroit Edison Public Academy; Penn State	Detroit, MI
G	1	Amaya Williams	5 ft 8 in (1.73 m)	Fr	Mater Dei HS	Mission Viejo, CA
G	4	Jyah LoVett	5 ft 8 in (1.73 m)	Jr	Bella Vista College Preparatory; San Jose State	San Gabriel, CA
C	7	Martina Fantini	6 ft 3 in (1.91 m)	Fr	U20 Italian National Team	Florence, Italy
G	10	Acacia Hayes	5 ft 7 in (1.7 m)	Sr	Riverdale HS; Western Kentucky	Murfreesboro, TN
G	11	Marley Washenitz	5 ft 7 in (1.7 m)	Sr	Fairmont HS; Pittsburgh	Fairmont, WV
G	12	Makayla Moore	6 ft 0 in (1.83 m)	Sr	Archbishop Mitty HS; Seattle	San Jose, CA
G	13	Last-Tear Poa	5 ft 11 in (1.8 m)	GS	UC Senior Secondary College Lake Ginninderra; LSU	Melbourne, Australia
F	14	Heloisa Carrera	6 ft 2 in (1.88 m)	So	IMG Academy; Ole Miss	São Paulo, Brazil
F	15	Heavenly Greer	6 ft 3 in (1.91 m)	GS	Ganesha High School; Kansas State	Phoenix, AZ
F	21	McKinna Brackens	6 ft 1 in (1.85 m)	So	Fairfield HS; UNLV	Fairfield, TX
C	22	Timya Grice	6 ft 5 in (1.96 m)	So	Taylor HS	Katy, TX
G	23	Jordan Jones	6 ft 0 in (1.83 m)	Sr	Cheyenne East HS; Denver	Cheyenne, WY
G/F	24	Deborah Davenport	6 ft 2 in (1.88 m)	RS Jr	Woodward HS; Northwest Florida State College	Cincinnati, OH

Head coach

- Molly Miller (Drury)

Assistant coach(es)

- Stephanie Norman (Arizona State)
- Jason Glover (Grand Canyon)
- Daniel Barber (Florida)
- Abi Olajuwon (Oklahoma)
- Daejah Bernard (Drury)

Legend

- (C) Team captain
- (S) Suspended
- (I) Ineligible
- (W) Walk-on
- Injured
- Current redshirt

Roster

== Schedule and results ==
Date time, TV	Rank^{#}	Opponent^{#}	Result	Record	High points	High rebounds	High assists	Site (attendance) city, state
Non-conference regular season
November 3, 2025*; 6:30 p.m., ESPN+		Coppin State	W 67–53	1–0	17 – Washenitz	8 – Brackens	10 – Poa	Desert Financial Arena (4,026); Tempe, AZ
November 8, 2025*; 2:00 p.m., ESPN+		Eastern Washington	W 73–58	2–0	15 – Elliott	7 – Washenitz	5 – Brackens	Desert Financial Arena (2,261); Tempe, AZ
November 13, 2025*; 7:00 p.m., ESPN+		at San Diego	W 79–47	3–0	24 – Elliott	7 – Elliott	11 – Williams	Jenny Craig Pavilion (619); San Diego, CA
November 16, 2025*; 2:00 p.m., ESPN+		at Santa Clara	W 82–77	4–0	23 – Brackens	16 – Elliott	5 – Tied	Leavey Center (448); Santa Clara, CA
November 22, 2025*; 2:00 p.m., ESPN+		UNLV	W 56–53	5–0	23 – Brackens	10 – Brackens	5 – Washenitz	Desert Financial Arena (2,728); Tempe, AZ
November 25, 2025*; 6:30 p.m., ESPN+		Utah Tech	W 81–54	6–0	19 – Brackens	10 – Brackens	3 – Williams	Desert Financial Arena (2,227); Tempe, AZ
November 28, 2025*; 10:30 a.m., ESPN+		Little Rock; Thanksgiving Tournament MTE	W 59–41	7–0	18 – Williams	6 – Brackens	3 – Williams	Desert Financial Arena (2,108); Tempe, AZ
November 29, 2025*; 6:30 p.m., ESPN+		Southeast Missouri State; Thanksgiving Tournament MTE	W 85–56	8–0	21 – Carrera	10 – Carrera	10 – Poa	Desert Financial Arena (2,321); Tempe, AZ
December 5, 2025*; 6:30 p.m., ESPN+		McNeese; Briann January Classic	W 57–47	9–0	19 – Elliott	15 – Brackens	4 – Washenitz	Mullett Arena (2,196); Tempe, AZ
December 6, 2025*; 2:30 p.m., ESPN+		San Francisco; Briann January Classic	W 67–44	10–0	15 – Brackens	5 – Elliott	6 – Washenitz	Mullett Arena (2,414); Tempe, AZ
December 9, 2025*; 5:00 p.m., BTN		at Penn State	W 74–60	11–0	27 – Elliott	11 – Brackens	4 – Poa	Bryce Jordan Center (1,590); State College, PA
December 14, 2025*; 2:00 p.m., ESPN+		at Oregon State	W 55–53 ^{OT}	12–0	12 – Carrera	7 – Carrera	4 – Poa	Gill Coliseum (3,143); Corvallis, OR
December 16, 2025*; 7:00 p.m., ESPN+		at Gonzaga	W 68–66	13–0	30 – Elliott	6 – Fantini	5 – Poa	McCarthey Athletic Center (4,742); Spokane, WA
Big 12 regular season
December 21, 2025; 5:00 p.m., ESPN+		Colorado	W 79–63	14–0 (1–0)	18 – Brackens	5 – Davenport	4 – Washenitz	Desert Financial Arena (7,421); Tempe, AZ
December 31, 2025; 2:00 p.m., ESPN+		at Utah	W 69–68	15–0 (2–0)	31 – Brackens	8 – Poa	7 – Poa	Jon M. Huntsman Center (2,594); Salt Lake City, UT
January 3, 2026; 2:00 p.m., ESPN+		at BYU	L 62–71	15–1 (2–1)	21 – Elliot	9 – Carrera	4 – LoVett	Marriott Center (3,400); Provo, UT
January 7, 2026; 6:30 p.m., ESPN+		UCF	W 68–45	16–1 (3–1)	20 – Carrera	11 – Brackens	6 – Poa	Desert Financial Arena (2,422); Tempe, AZ
January 11, 2026; 3:00 p.m., ESPN+		at No. 13 TCU	L 46–77	16–2 (3–2)	19 – Elliott	7 – Elliott	5 – Washenitz	Schollmaier Arena (2,827); Fort Worth, TX
January 17, 2026; 2:00 p.m., ESPN+		Kansas	W 67–51	17–2 (4–2)	22 – Carrera	7 – Carrera	5 – Poa	Desert Financial Arena (3,812); Tempe, AZ
January 21, 2026; 5:00 p.m., ESPN+		at No. 22 West Virginia	L 43–53	17–3 (4–3)	15 – Tied	8 – Carrera	2 – Tied	Hope Coliseum (3,197); Morgantown, WV
January 24, 2026; 12:00 p.m., ESPN+		at Cincinnati	L 64–66	17–4 (4–4)	18 – Brackens	6 – Tied	6 – Elliott	Fifth Third Arena (2,221); Cincinnati, OH
January 28, 2026; 6:30 p.m., ESPN+		Arizona	W 68–61	18–4 (5–4)	22 – Elliott	10 – Tied	4 – Poa	Desert Financial Arena (6,121); Tempe, AZ
February 1, 2026; 2:00 p.m., ESPN+		Kansas State	L 67–74	18–5 (5–5)	20 – Brackens	6 – Brackens	5 – Tied	Desert Financial Arena (3,954); Tempe, AZ
February 4, 2026; 6:30 p.m., ESPN+		Oklahoma State	W 74–69	19–5 (6–5)	20 – Brackens	9 – Davenport	6 – Poa	Desert Financial Arena (3,138); Tempe, AZ
February 7, 2026; 4:00 p.m., FS1		at No. 15 Baylor	L 64–67	19–6 (6–6)	25 – Elliott	6 – Tied	2 – Tied	Foster Pavilion (4,213); Waco, TX
February 11, 2026; 6:30 p.m., ESPN+		Utah	W 71–61	20–6 (7–6)	19 – Elliott	5 – Tied	6 – Brackens	Desert Financial Arena (3,051); Tempe, AZ
February 14, 2026; 11:00 a.m., ESPN+		at Arizona	W 75–69 ^{OT}	21–6 (8–6)	24 – Brackens	11 – Carrera	6 – LoVett	McKale Center (8,766); Tucson, AZ
February 18, 2026; 5:30 p.m., ESPN+		at Iowa State	L 64–90	21–7 (8–7)	21 – Brackens	7 – Elliott	3 – Tied	Hilton Coliseum (9,232); Ames, IA
February 21, 2026; 2:00 p.m., ESPN+		Houston	W 81–56	22–7 (9–7)	23 – Carrera	8 – Tied	4 – Tied	Desert Financial Arena (4,740); Tempe, AZ
February 25, 2026; 6:30 p.m., ESPN+		BYU	L 61–66	22–8 (9–8)	16 – Brackens	7 – Washenitz	5 – Poa	Desert Financial Arena (6,755); Tempe, AZ
March 1, 2026; 1:00 p.m., ESPN+		at No. 20 Texas Tech	L 51–58	22–9 (9–9)	15 – Elliott	7 – Poa	6 – Poa	United Supermarkets Arena (5,508); Lubbock, TX
Big 12 Tournament
March 4, 2026*; 4:30 p.m., ESPN+	(10)	vs. (15) Arizona; First Round	W 54–51	23–9	16 – Carrera	8 – Davenport	3 – Tied	T-Mobile Center (4,144); Kansas City, MO
March 5, 2026*; 4:30 p.m., ESPN+	(10)	vs. (7) Iowa State; Second Round	W 77–68	24–9	22 – Elliot	10 – Elliot	8 – Elliot	T-Mobile Center (4,646); Kansas City, MO
March 6, 2026*; 4:30 p.m., ESPN+	(10)	vs. (2) No. 15 West Virginia; Quarterfinals	L 54–67	24–10	14 – Washenitz	8 – Poa	3 – Tied	T-Mobile Center (4,771); Kansas City, MO
NCAA Tournament
March 20, 2026*; 6:00 p.m., ESPN2	(10 S4)	vs. (10 S4) Virginia; First Four	L 55–57	24–11	19 – Washenitz	10 – Brackens	4 – Tied	Carver–Hawkeye Arena (707); Iowa City, IA
*Non-conference game. ^{#}Rankings from AP Poll. (#) Tournament seedings in parentheses. S4=Sacramento 4. All times are in Mountain Time.

== Rankings ==
Ranking movements Legend: ██ Increase in ranking ██ Decrease in ranking — = Not ranked RV = Received votes
	Week																				
Poll	Pre	1	2	3	4	5	6	7	8	9	10	11	12	13	14	15	16	17	18	19	Final
AP	—	—	—	—	—	—	RV	RV	RV*	—	—										Not released
Coaches	—	—	—	—	—	—	—	—	RV	RV	RV	RV									

*AP did not release a week 8 poll.

== See also ==
- 2025–26 Arizona State Sun Devils men's basketball team
