= 2025–26 Houston Cougars women's basketball team =

2025–26 Houston Cougars women's basketball
- Conference: Big 12 Conference
- Record: 7–23 (1–17 Big 12)
- Head coach: Matthew Mitchell (1st season)
- Associate head coach: Damitria Buchanan
- Assistant coaches: Anthony Anderson; DeNesha Stallworth; Marqu'es Webb; Dominique Dillingham
- Home arena: Fertitta Center

2025–26 Big 12 women's basketball standings
	Conf.				Overall
Team	W		L	PCT	W		L	PCT
No. 6 TCU	15	–	3	.833	32	–	6	.842
No. 18 West Virginia †	14	–	4	.778	28	–	7	.800
No. 23 Baylor	13	–	5	.722	25	–	9	.735
Oklahoma State	12	–	6	.667	24	–	10	.706
Texas Tech	12	–	6	.667	26	–	8	.765
Colorado	11	–	7	.611	22	–	12	.647
Iowa State	10	–	8	.556	22	–	10	.688
Utah	10	–	8	.556	19	–	13	.594
BYU	9	–	9	.500	26	–	12	.684
Arizona State	9	–	9	.500	24	–	11	.686
Kansas	8	–	10	.444	22	–	14	.611
Kansas State	8	–	10	.444	19	–	18	.514
Cincinnati	6	–	12	.333	11	–	20	.355
UCF	3	–	15	.167	11	–	19	.367
Arizona	3	–	15	.167	12	–	18	.400
Houston	1	–	17	.056	7	–	23	.233
† 2026 Big 12 tournament winner Rankings from AP poll

The 2025–26 Houston Cougars women's basketball team represented the University of Houston during the 2025–26 NCAA Division I women's basketball season. The Cougars, led by first-year head coach Matthew Mitchell, played their home games at the Fertitta Center as members of the Big 12 Conference.

== Previous season ==
The Cougars finished the 2024–25 season 5–25, 1–17 in Big 12 play to finish in last place. They lost in the first round to Colorado in the Big 12 women's tournament.

Head Coach Ronald Hughey announced his resignation from Houston on March 6, 2025, after 11 seasons. The Cougars hired former Kentucky head coach Mitchell as his replacement on March 27.

== Offseason ==
=== Departures ===
Houston departures
Name	Number	Pos.	Height	Year	Hometown	Reason for departure
Leilani Augmon	0	G	5'11"	(redshirt) Senior	Orlando, FL	Graduated
Gia Cooke	3	G	5'9"	(redshirt) Sophomore	Clinton, MD	Transferred to West Virginia
Maliyah Johnson	5	F	6'0"	Senior	Columbus, OH	Graduated
Laila Blair	14	G	5'8"	Graduate student	Houston, TX	Graduated
Tatiana Arevalo	20	G	5'9"	Sophomore	Frisco, TX	Walk-on; TBD
Kiera Edmonds	21	F	6'2"	Sophomore	Brooklyn, NY	Transferred to Boston College
Avalon Miller	22	F	6'3"	(redshirt) Senior	Salt Lake City, UT	Graduated
Eylia Love	24	G	6'1"	Senior	Kansas City, MO	Graduated
Ashley Chevalier	25	G	5'7"	Senior	Chatsworth, CA	Graduated
Peyton McFarland	42	F	6'4"	Graduate student	Boise, ID	Graduated

=== Incoming ===
Houston incoming transfers
Name	Num	Pos.	Height	Year	Hometown	Previous school
TK Pitts	0	G	6'1"	Junior	Tulsa, OK	SMU
Briana Peguero	1	G	5'7"	Graduate student	Houston, TX	Troy
Kyndall Hunter	7	G	5'7"	(redshirt) Senior	Houston, TX	Texas A&M
Amani Bartlett	12	F	6'3"	Graduate student	Cleveland, TX	LSU
Amirah Abdur-Rahim	23	F	6'3"	Graduate student	Marietta, GA	Texas A&M
Shun'teria Anumele	24	G	5'8"	Sophomore	Houston, TX	Saint Louis
Jorynn Ross	26	F	6'3"	Junior	Milwaukee, WI	Arizona

== Roster ==
2025–26 Houston Cougars women's basketball team
Players
Coaches

Pos.	#	Name	Height	Year	Previous school	Hometown
G	0	TK Pitts	6 ft 1 in (1.85 m)	So	Union HS; SMU	Tulsa, OK
G	1	Briana Peguero	5 ft 7 in (1.7 m)	GS	Jersey Village HS; Troy	Houston, TX
G	2	Kierra Merchant	5 ft 7 in (1.7 m)	Jr	Westfield	Spring, TX
G	5	Kateri Poole	5 ft 8 in (1.73 m)	GS	South Shore; LSU	Bronx, NY
G	7	Kyndall Hunter	5 ft 7 in (1.7 m)	RS Sr	Cypress Creek; Texas A&M	Houston, TX
G	8	Summer Bostock	6 ft 1 in (1.85 m)	Jr	King's Christian Collegiate; Maryland	Toronto, ON
F	11	Jemma Hunter	6 ft 5 in (1.96 m)	Fr	Euroa Secondary College	Gold Coast, Australia
F	12	Amani Bartlett	6 ft 3 in (1.91 m)	GS	Houston Christian HS; LSU	Cleveland, TX
F	14	Jade Jones	5 ft 10 in (1.78 m)	Fr	The King's Academy	Royal Palm Beach, FL
G	22	Kayla King	5 ft 10 in (1.78 m)	Fr	Judson	San Antonio, TX
F	23	Amirah Abdur-Rahim	6 ft 3 in (1.91 m)	GS	St. Francis School; Texas A&M	Marietta, GA
G	24	Shun'teria Anumele	5 ft 8 in (1.73 m)	So	Legacy Sports School of Sciences; Saint Louis	Houston, TX
F	26	Jorynn Ross	6 ft 3 in (1.91 m)	Jr	Summer Creek; Arizona	Milwaukee, WI

Head coach

- Matthew Mitchell (Mississippi State)

Assistant coach(es)

- Damitria Buchanan (Texas A&M)
- Anthony Anderson (FIU)
- DeNesha Stallworth (Kentucky)
- Marqu'es Webb (Vanderbilt)
- Dominique Dillingham (Mississippi State)

Legend

- (C) Team captain
- (S) Suspended
- (I) Ineligible
- (W) Walk-on
- Injured
- Current redshirt

Roster

== Schedule and results ==
Date time, TV	Rank^{#}	Opponent^{#}	Result	Record	High points	High rebounds	High assists	Site (attendance) city, state
Non-conference regular season
November 4, 2025*; 6:30 p.m., ESPN+		UT Arlington	W 76–59	1–0	16 – Abdur-Rahim	9 – Jones	4 – Poole	Fertitta Center (1,025); Houston, TX
November 8, 2025*; 7:00 p.m., ESPN+		UTSA	W 52–48	2–0	21 – Merchant	11 – Abdur-Rahim	5 – Peguero	Fertitta Center (1,161); Houston, TX
November 11, 2025*; 6:30 p.m., ESPN+		Rice; Rivalry	L 56–70	2–1	12 – Tied	14 – Merchant	2 – Tied	Fertitta Center (1,104); Houston, TX
November 17, 2025*; 6:00 p.m., ESPN+		at Stephen F. Austin	L 78–82	2–2	20 – K. Hunter	6 – Tied	2 – Tied	William R. Johnson Coliseum (1,182); Nacogdoches, TX
November 20, 2025*; 6:30 p.m., ESPN+		at UT Rio Grande Valley	W 65–63	3–2	18 – Jones	8 – Jones	3 – Tied	UTRGV Fieldhouse (1,447); Edinburg, TX
November 23, 2025*; 2:00 p.m., ESPN+		High Point	W 67–57	4–2	18 – Merchant	12 – Jones	4 – Peguero	Fertitta Center (1,225); Houston, TX
November 28, 2025*; 12:30 p.m., FloCollege		vs. Arkansas State; Nassau Championship Goombay Division semifinals	L 66–83	4–3	12 – Pitts	10 – Merchant	4 – Tied	Baha Mar Convention Center (237); Nassau, The Bahamas
November 30, 2025*; 10:00 a.m., FloCollege		vs. Tulsa; Nassau Championship Goombay Division 3rd place game	W 66–61	5–3	17 – Pitts	8 – Pitts	4 – Peguero	Baha Mar Convention Center (227); Nassau, The Bahamas
December 7, 2025*; 2:00 p.m., ESPN+		Southern	L 62–70	5–4	14 – K. Hunter	7 – Jones	6 – Pitts	Fertitta Center (985); Houston, TX
December 13, 2025*; 8:00 p.m., MW Network		at New Mexico	L 41–63	5–5	10 – Merchant	8 – Jones	3 – Pitts	The Pit (4,467); Albuquerque, NM
December 16, 2025*; 11:00 a.m., ESPN+		Montana	W 60–54	6–5	14 – Peguero	12 – Pitts	3 – Merchant	Fertitta Center (1,523); Houston, TX
Big 12 regular season
December 21, 2025; 1:00 p.m., ESPN+		at West Virginia	L 46–101	6–6 (0–1)	11 – Abdur-Rahim	7 – Merchant	2 – Abdur-Rahim	Hope Coliseum (3,968); Morgantown, WV
December 31, 2025; 1:00 p.m., ESPN+		No. 10 Iowa State	L 62–80	6–7 (0–2)	14 – Peguero	15 – Pitts	4 – Merchant	Fertitta Center (1,652); Houston, TX
January 3, 2026; 3:00 p.m., ESPN+		at Oklahoma State	L 52–83	6–8 (0–3)	15 – Pitts	8 – Pitts	2 – Tied	Gallagher-Iba Arena (2,771); Stillwater, OK
January 7, 2026; 6:30 p.m., ESPN+		Kansas State	L 62–71	6–9 (0–4)	16 – Pitts	8 – Abdur-Rahim	3 – Tied	Fertitta Center (1,395); Houston, TX
January 10, 2026; 1:00 p.m., ESPN+		BYU	L 64–79	6–10 (0–5)	19 – K. Hunter	9 – Jones	3 – Tied	Fertitta Center (1,075); Houston, TX
January 13, 2026; 6:00 p.m., ESPN+		at No. 17 Texas Tech	L 59–71	6–11 (0–6)	17 – Pitts	14 – Abdur-Rahim	2 – Tied	United Supermarkets Arena (5,003); Lubbock, TX
January 17, 2026; 1:00 p.m., ESPN+		Utah	L 61–71	6–12 (0–7)	14 – Pitts	9 – Jones	3 – Peguero	Fertitta Center (1,204); Houston, TX
January 21, 2026; 6:30 p.m., ESPN+		at Kansas State	L 65–69	6–13 (0–8)	20 – K. Hunter	10 – Pitts	3 – Tied	Bramlage Coliseum (3,497); Manhattan, KS
January 27, 2026; 7:00 p.m., ESPN+		at No. 14 Baylor	L 66–82	6–14 (0–9)	17 – Abdur-Rahim	5 – Ross	7 – Peguero	Foster Pavilion (3,438); Waco, TX
February 1, 2026; 2:00 p.m., ESPN+		Cincinnati	W 72–70	7–14 (1–9)	23 – K. Hunter	7 – Pitts	3 – K. Hunter	Fertitta Center (1,180); Houston, TX
February 4, 2026; 6:30 p.m., ESPN+		at No. 14 TCU	L 45–90	7–15 (1–10)	12 – Merchant	4 – Pitts	3 – Peguero	Schollmaier Arena (2,968); Fort Worth, TX
February 7, 2026; 5:00 p.m., ESPN+		No. 18 Texas Tech	L 61–85	7–16 (1–11)	18 – Abdur-Rahim	7 – Abdur-Rahim	2 – Tied	Fertitta Center (1,910); Houston, TX
February 11, 2026; 6:30 p.m., ESPN+		Colorado	L 63–73	7–17 (1–12)	21 – Peguero	8 – Pitts	3 – Pitts	Fertitta Center (976); Houston, TX
February 14, 2026; 4:00 p.m., ESPN+		at Kansas	L 68–85	7–18 (1–13)	23 – Peguero	6 – Pitts	3 – Tied	Allen Fieldhouse (3,744); Lawrence, KS
February 18, 2026; 6:30 p.m., ESPN+		No. 12 TCU	L 50–72	7–19 (1–14)	20 – K. Hunter	11 – Pitts	3 – King	Fertitta Center (1,098); Houston, TX
February 21, 2026; 3:00 p.m., ESPN+		at Arizona State	L 56–81	7–20 (1–15)	13 – Tied	7 – Pitts	3 – Tied	Desert Financial Arena (4,740); Tempe, AZ
February 24, 2026; 7:00 p.m., ESPN+		at Arizona	L 67–75	7–21 (1–16)	21 – K. Hunter	9 – Abdur-Rahim	3 – Tied	McKale Center (5,576); Tucson, AZ
March 1, 2026; 2:00 p.m., ESPN+		UCF	L 62–72	7–22 (1–17)	13 – Pitts	8 – Abdur-Rahim	4 – Hunter	Fertitta Center (1,103); Houston, TX
Big 12 Conference Tournament
March 4, 2026; 1:30 p.m., ESPN+	(16)	vs. (9) BYU; First Round	L 66–76	7–23	17 – Amuele	10 – Pitts	2 – Merchant	T-Mobile Center; Kansas City, MO
*Non-conference game. ^{#}Rankings from AP Poll. (#) Tournament seedings in parentheses. All times are in Central Time.

== See also ==
- 2025–26 Houston Cougars men's basketball team
