= 2025–26 Kansas Jayhawks women's basketball team =

American college basketball season

2025–26 Kansas Jayhawks women's basketball

WBIT, Semifinals
- Conference: Big 12 Conference
- Record: 22–14 (8–10 Big 12)
- Head coach: Brandon Schneider (11th season)
- Associate head coach: Morgan Paige
- Assistant coaches: Karyla Knight; Brock McGinnis; Patrick Schrater
- Home arena: Allen Fieldhouse

2025–26 Big 12 women's basketball standings
	Conf.				Overall
Team	W		L	PCT	W		L	PCT
No. 6 TCU	15	–	3	.833	32	–	6	.842
No. 18 West Virginia †	14	–	4	.778	28	–	7	.800
No. 23 Baylor	13	–	5	.722	25	–	9	.735
Oklahoma State	12	–	6	.667	24	–	10	.706
Texas Tech	12	–	6	.667	26	–	8	.765
Colorado	11	–	7	.611	22	–	12	.647
Iowa State	10	–	8	.556	22	–	10	.688
Utah	10	–	8	.556	19	–	13	.594
BYU	9	–	9	.500	26	–	12	.684
Arizona State	9	–	9	.500	24	–	11	.686
Kansas	8	–	10	.444	22	–	14	.611
Kansas State	8	–	10	.444	19	–	18	.514
Cincinnati	6	–	12	.333	11	–	20	.355
UCF	3	–	15	.167	11	–	19	.367
Arizona	3	–	15	.167	12	–	18	.400
Houston	1	–	17	.056	7	–	23	.233
† 2026 Big 12 tournament winner Rankings from AP poll

The 2025–26 Kansas Jayhawks women's basketball team represents the University of Kansas during the 2025–26 NCAA Division I women's basketball season. The Jayhawks are led by eleventh-year head coach Brandon Schneider and play their home games at the Allen Fieldhouse as a member of the Big 12 Conference.

== Previous season ==
The Jayhawks finished the season 16–14, 6–12 in Big 12 play to finish in eleventh place. As the 11th seed in the Big 12 tournament, they lost in the first round to Texas Tech.

== Offseason ==
=== Departures ===
Kansas departures
Name	Num	Pos.	Height	Year	Hometown	Reason for departure
Wyvette Mayberry	0	G	5'7"	Graduate student	Tulsa, OK	Transferred to Arkansas
Freddie Wallace	10	F	6'2"	Junior	Lincoln, NE	Transferred to Arizona
Danai Papadopoulou	14	C	6'4"	Senior	Thessaloniki, Greece	Graduated
Zoe Canfield	15	G	5'11"	Freshman	Topeka, KS	Transferred to Missouri State
Carla Osma	16	G	6'0"	Freshman	Madrid, Spain	Signed to play professionally in Spain with CB Estudiantes
McKenzie Smith	25	F	6'0"	Sophomore	Amarillo, TX	Transferred
Jordan Webester	32	G	5'10"	Graduate student	Dallas, TX	Transferred to Texas A&M

=== Incoming transfers ===
Kansas incoming transfers
Name	Num	Pos.	Height	Year	Hometown	Previous school
Lilly Meister	52	F	6'3"	Senior	Rochester, MN	Indiana

=== 2025 recruiting class ===
College recruiting
Name	Hometown	School	Height	Weight	Commit date
Jaliya Davis; F	Overland Park, KS	Blue Valley North High School	6 ft 2 in (1.88 m)	N/A	Nov 20, 2024
Jaliya Davis; F	Recruit ratings: 247Sports: ESPN: (96)				
Keeley Parks; G	Overland Park, KS	Blue Valley North High School	5 ft 11 in (1.80 m)	N/A	Nov 21, 2024
Keeley Parks; G	Recruit ratings: 247Sports: ESPN: (96)				
Libby Fandel; G	Cedar Rapids, IA	Xavier High School	6 ft 0 in (1.83 m)	N/A	Nov 13, 2024
Libby Fandel; G	Recruit ratings: 247Sports: ESPN: (94)				
Tatyonna Brown; SF	USAF Academy, CO	Air Academy High School	6 ft 2 in (1.88 m)	N/A	Nov 13, 2024
Tatyonna Brown; SF	Recruit ratings: No ratings found				
Overall recruit ranking:
Note: In many cases, Scout, Rivals, 247Sports, On3, and ESPN may conflict in their listings of height and weight.; In these cases, the average was taken. ESPN grades are on a 100-point scale.; Sources: "2025 Player Commits". ESPN. Archived from the original on October 6, 2025.

=== 2026 recruiting class ===
College recruiting (2026)
Name	Hometown	School	Height	Weight	Commit date
Brooklyn Renn; PF	Sellersburg, IN	Silver Creek High School	6 ft 0 in (1.83 m)	N/A	Sep 30, 2025
Brooklyn Renn; PF	Recruit ratings: 247Sports: ESPN: (92)				
Mollie Ernstes; SG	North Vernon, IN	Jennings County High School	6 ft 0 in (1.83 m)	N/A	Oct 1, 2025
Mollie Ernstes; SG	Recruit ratings: 247Sports: ESPN: (92)				
Overall recruit ranking:
Note: In many cases, Scout, Rivals, 247Sports, On3, and ESPN may conflict in their listings of height and weight.; In these cases, the average was taken. ESPN grades are on a 100-point scale.; Sources: "2026 Player Commits". ESPN. Archived from the original on October 6, 2025.

== Roster ==
2025–26 Kansas Jayhawks women's basketball team
Players
Coaches

Pos.	#	Name	Height	Year	Hometown
G	4	Keeley Parks	5 ft 11 in (1.8 m)	Fr	Norman, OK
G	6	Laia Conesa	5 ft 11 in (1.8 m)	Jr	Barcelona, Spain
G	12	S'Mya Nichols	6 ft 0 in (1.83 m)	Jr	Overland Park, KS
G	13	Libby Fandel	6 ft 1 in (1.85 m)	Fr	Cedar Rapids, IA
F	15	Tatyonna Brown	6 ft 2 in (1.88 m)	Fr	Colorado Springs, CO
G	21	Elle Evans	6 ft 3 in (1.91 m)	Sr	Edwardsville, IL
G	22	Sania Copeland	5 ft 7 in (1.7 m)	Sr	Kansas City, KS
G	23	Brittany Harshaw	6 ft 1 in (1.85 m)	RS Jr	Andover, KS
F	24	Regan Williams	6 ft 3 in (1.91 m)	So	Kansas City, MO
F	25	Jaliya Davis	6 ft 2 in (1.88 m)	Fr	Overland Park, KS
C	33	Nadira Eltayeb	6 ft 4 in (1.93 m)	GS	Seattle, WA
F	52	Lilly Meister	6 ft 3 in (1.91 m)	Sr	Rochester, MN

Head coach

- Brandon Schneider (Wayland Baptist)

Assistant coach(es)

- Morgan Paige (Wisconsin)
- Karyla Knight (Alabama)
- Brock McGinnis (Ottawa)
- Patrick Schrater (Kansas)

Legend

- (C) Team captain
- (S) Suspended
- (I) Ineligible
- (W) Walk-on
- Injured
- Current redshirt

Roster

== Schedule and results ==
Date time, TV	Rank^{#}	Opponent^{#}	Result	Record	High points	High rebounds	High assists	Site (attendance) city, state
Exhibition
October 29, 2025*; 6:30 p.m., ESPN+		Fort Hays State	W 90–59		29 – Davis	8 – Davis	5 – S'mya	Allen Fieldhouse; Lawrence, KS
Non-conference regular season
November 5, 2025*; 6:30 p.m., ESPN+		Kansas City	W 74–64	1–0	21 – Nichols	9 – Meister	7 – Nichols	Allen Fieldhouse (3,581); Lawrence, KS
November 9, 2025*; 2:00 p.m., ESPN+		Northwestern State	W 75–60	2–0	28 – Davis	8 – Meister	7 – Nichols	Allen Fieldhouse (3,174); Lawrence, KS
November 12, 2025*; 6:30 p.m., ESPN+		Lamar	W 65–54	3–0	15 – Nichols	15 – Williams	6 – Nichols	Allen Fieldhouse (3,006); Lawrence, KS
November 15, 2025*; 6:00 p.m., ESPN+		vs. Missouri; Border War/StorageMart Border Showdown	W 82–77	4–0	20 – Tied	7 – Williams	7 – Nichols	T-Mobile Center; Kansas City, MO
November 19, 2025*; 6:30 p.m., ESPN+		Minnesota	W 63–57	5–0	24 – Nichols	10 – Meister	3 – Nichols	Allen Fieldhouse (3,518); Lawrence, KS
November 23, 2025*; 2:00 p.m., ESPN+		Oral Roberts	W 86–75	6–0	15 – Nichols	7 – Meister	5 – Nichols	Allen Fieldhouse (3,646); Lawrence, KS
November 28, 2025*; 6:30 p.m., Ion		vs. Georgia; Fort Myers Tip-Off Island Division	L 62–68	6–1	40 – Nichols	12 – Meister	3 – Nichols	Suncoast Credit Union Arena (944); Fort Myers, FL
November 29, 2025*; 6:30 p.m., Ion		vs. Dayton; Fort Myers Tip-Off Island Division	L 58–59	6–2	16 – Evans	4 – Williams	3 – Williams	Suncoast Credit Union Arena (932); Fort Myers, FL
December 3, 2025*; 7:00 p.m., B1G+		at Northwestern	W 74–62	7–2	22 – Williams	11 – Meister	7 – Nichols	Welsh–Ryan Arena (918); Evanston, IL
December 7, 2025*; 2:00 p.m., ESPN+		at Missouri State	W 73–70 ^{OT}	8–2	24 – Nichols	7 – Nichols	6 – Nichols	Great Southern Bank Arena (2,338); Springfield, MO
December 14, 2025*; 2:00 p.m., ESPN+		Denver	W 77–38	9–2	21 – Nichols	8 – Brown	3 – Tied	Allen Fieldhouse (3,709); Lawrence, KS
December 17, 2025*; 6:30 p.m., ESPN+		Haskell	W 107–39	10–2	26 – Harshaw	9 – Meister	8 – Conesa	Allen Fieldhouse (4,646); Lawrence, KS
Big 12 Conference regular season
December 21, 2025; 12:00 p.m., ESPN2		at No. 10 Iowa State	L 76–79	10–3 (0–1)	29 – Nichols	6 – Conesa	7 – Nichols	Hilton Coliseum (10,699); Ames, IA
January 1, 2026; 12:00 p.m., ESPN+		West Virginia	L 72–79	10–4 (0–2)	21 – Davis	9 – Meister	5 – Nichols	Allen Fieldhouse (4,149); Lawrence, KS
January 4, 2026; 1:00 p.m., ESPN+		at UCF	W 83–68	11–4 (1–2)	26 – Davis	6 – Meister	7 – Nichols	Addition Financial Arena (1,075); Orlando, FL
January 7, 2026; 6:30 p.m., ESPN+		Utah	L 59–62	11–5 (1–3)	20 – Davis	6 – Meister	5 – Nichols	Allen Fieldhouse (3,458); Lawrence, KS
January 11, 2026; 2:00 p.m., ESPN+		at No. 16 Baylor	L 64–79	11–6 (1–4)	21 – Davis	10 – Meister	7 – Nichols	Foster Pavilion (3,651); Waco, TX
January 14, 2026; 6:30 p.m., ESPN+		Oklahoma State	L 76–85	11–7 (1–5)	30 – Davis	6 – Tied	6 – Nichols	Allen Fieldhouse (3,346); Lawrence, KS
January 17, 2026; 3:00 p.m., ESPN+		at Arizona State	L 51–67	11–8 (1–6)	11 – Tied	5 – Davis	3 – Copeland	Desert Financial Arena (3,812); Tempe, AZ
January 20, 2026; 7:00 p.m., ESPN+		at Arizona	W 80–69	12–8 (2–6)	25 – Davis	8 – Davis	4 – Tied	McKale Center (5,503); Tucson, AZ
January 25, 2026; 12:00 p.m., FS1		Kansas State; Sunflower Showdown	W 83–61	13–8 (3–6)	22 – Davis	8 – Davis	6 – Nichols	Allen Fieldhouse (6,129); Lawrence, KS
January 29, 2026; 5:00 p.m., ESPN		at No. 12 TCU	L 77–79	13–9 (3–7)	29 – Davis	9 – Davis	4 – Copeland	Schollmaier Arena (2,613); Fort Worth, TX
February 1, 2026; 2:00 p.m., ESPN+		Colorado	L 66–69 ^{OT}	13–10 (3–8)	22 – Nichols	9 – Evans	5 – Nichols	Allen Fieldhouse (3,942); Lawrence, KS
February 4, 2026; 6:30 p.m., ESPN+		BYU	W 81–60	14–10 (4–8)	28 – Davis	12 – Davis	4 – Tied	Allen Fieldhouse (3,679); Lawrence, KS
February 7, 2026; 4:30 p.m., ESPN+		Cincinnati	W 80–71	15–10 (5–8)	28 – Davis	8 – Tied	6 – Nichols	Allen Fieldhouse (6,171); Lawrence, KS
February 10, 2026; 6:00 p.m., ESPN+		at No. 16 Texas Tech	L 65–70	15–11 (5–9)	15 – Nichols	6 – Williams	2 – Tied	United Supermarkets Arena (3,893); Lubbock, TX
February 14, 2026; 4:00 p.m., ESPN+		Houston	W 85–68	16–11 (6–9)	25 – Davis	10 – Meister	9 – Nichols	Allen Fieldhouse (3,744); Lawrence, KS
February 21, 2026; 4:00 p.m., ESPN+		at Kansas State; Sunflower Showdown	W 75–68	17–11 (7–9)	17 – Nichols	9 – Davis	4 – Tied	Bramlage Coliseum (4,845); Manhattan, KS
February 25, 2026; 6:30 p.m., ESPN+		No. 20 Texas Tech	W 68–59	18–11 (8–9)	19 – Nichols	10 – Davis	3 – Nichols	Allen Fieldhouse (3,566); Lawrence, KS
February 28, 2026; 5:00 p.m., FS1		at Oklahoma State	L 56–70	18–12 (8-10)	24 – Davis	4 – Tied	4 – Copeland	Gallagher-Iba Arena (3,091); Stillwater, OK
Big 12 Conference Tournament
March 4, 2026; 8:15 p.m., ESPN+	(11)	vs. (14) UCF; First Round	W 56–35	19–12	10 – Davis	11 – Davis	4 – Nichols	T-Mobile Center (4,144); Kansas City, MO
March 5, 2026; 8:30 p.m., ESPN+	(11)	vs. (6) Colorado; Second Round	L 48–55	19–13	14 – Nichols	6 – Davis	3 – Tied	T-Mobile Center (4,646); Kansas City, MO
WBIT tournament
March 19, 2026; 6:30 p.m., ESPN+	(2)	Troy; First Round	W 79–70	20–13	31 – Nichols	12 – Conesa	4 – Conesa	Allen Fieldhouse (985); Lawrence, KS
March 22, 2026; 5:30 p.m., ESPN+	(2)	(3) Rice; Second Round	W 62–55	21–13	15 – Williams	10 – Tied	3 – Nichols	Allen Fieldhouse (878); Lawrence, KS
March 26, 2026; 6:30 p.m., ESPN+	(2)	(4) San Diego State; Quarterfinal	W 85–78	22–13	25 – Davis	6 – Davis	5 – Nichols	Allen Fieldhouse (1,379); Lawrence, KS
March 30, 2026; 4:00 p.m., ESPNU	(2)	vs. (1) BYU; Semifinal	L 67–70	22–14	18 – Davis	9 – Meister	6 – Nichols	Charles Koch Arena (1,771); Wichita, KS
*Non-conference game. ^{#}Rankings from AP Poll. (#) Tournament seedings in parentheses. All times are in Central Time.

== Rankings ==
Ranking movements Legend: ██ Increase in ranking ██ Decrease in ranking — = Not ranked RV = Received votes
	Week																				
Poll	Pre	1	2	3	4	5	6	7	8	9	10	11	12	13	14	15	16	17	18	19	Final
AP	RV	RV	—	RV																	
Coaches	—	—	—	—																	

== See also ==
- 2025–26 Kansas Jayhawks men's basketball team
