= 2025–26 Cincinnati Bearcats women's basketball team =

American college basketball season

2025–26 Cincinnati Bearcats women's basketball
- Conference: Big 12 Conference
- Record: 11–20 (6–12 Big 12)
- Head coach: Katrina Merriweather (3rd season)
- Assistant coaches: Ashley Barlow; Abby Jump; Kabrina Merriweather
- Home arena: Fifth Third Arena

2025–26 Big 12 women's basketball standings
	Conf.				Overall
Team	W		L	PCT	W		L	PCT
No. 6 TCU	15	–	3	.833	32	–	6	.842
No. 18 West Virginia †	14	–	4	.778	28	–	7	.800
No. 23 Baylor	13	–	5	.722	25	–	9	.735
Oklahoma State	12	–	6	.667	24	–	10	.706
Texas Tech	12	–	6	.667	26	–	8	.765
Colorado	11	–	7	.611	22	–	12	.647
Iowa State	10	–	8	.556	22	–	10	.688
Utah	10	–	8	.556	19	–	13	.594
BYU	9	–	9	.500	26	–	12	.684
Arizona State	9	–	9	.500	24	–	11	.686
Kansas	8	–	10	.444	22	–	14	.611
Kansas State	8	–	10	.444	19	–	18	.514
Cincinnati	6	–	12	.333	11	–	20	.355
UCF	3	–	15	.167	11	–	19	.367
Arizona	3	–	15	.167	12	–	18	.400
Houston	1	–	17	.056	7	–	23	.233
† 2026 Big 12 tournament winner Rankings from AP poll

The 2025–26 Cincinnati Bearcats women's basketball team represents the University of Cincinnati during the 2025–26 NCAA Division I women's basketball season. The Bearcats, led by third-year head coach Katrina Merriweather and play their home games at the Fifth Third Arena as members of the Big 12 Conference.

== Previous season ==
The Bearcats finished the 2024–25 season 15–14, 7–11 in Big 12 play to finish in tenth place. As a No. 10 seed in the Big 12 women's tournament they lost in the first round to Arizona State.

== Offseason ==
=== Departures ===
Cincinnati Departures
Name	Number	Pos.	Height	Year	Hometown	Reason for Departure
Chloe Mann	0	G	5'8"	Freshman	Fort Worth, TX	Transferred to Grand Canyon
Tineya Hylton	2	G	5'7"	Senior	Toronto, ON	Graduated
Daylee Dunn	5	G	5'10"	Graduate Student	San Ramon, CA	Graduated
Aïcha Dia	6	G	6'0"	Junior	Montreal, QC	TBD
Abby Holtman	7	G	5'10"	Sophomore	Florence, KY	Transferred to Mercer
Brianna Byars	10	F	5'11"	Sophomore	Paris, KY	Transferred to Georgetown
Jillian Hayes	20	F	6'1"	Graduate Student	Cincinnati, OH	Graduated
A'riel Jackson	34	G	5'9"	Junior	Brooklyn, NY	Transferred to Auburn

=== Incoming ===
Cincinnati Incoming Transfers
Name	Num	Pos.	Height	Year	Hometown	Previous School
Mya Perry	1	G	5'11"	Senior	Reynoldsburg, OH	Florida Atlantic
Mary Carden	42	C	6'6"	Sophomore	Idabel, OK	Oral Roberts

==== Recruiting ====
College recruiting information
Name	Hometown	School	Height	Weight	Commit date
Darianna Alexander; G	Cincinnati, OH	Purcell Marian	6 ft 1 in (1.85 m)	N/A	Apr 17, 2024
Darianna Alexander; G	Recruit ratings: ESPN: (97)				
Kali Barrett; SF	Bradenton, FL	Cardinal Mooney HS	6 ft 2 in (1.88 m)	N/A	Jul 15, 2024
Kali Barrett; SF	Recruit ratings: 247Sports:				
Caliyah DeVillasee; PG	Owings Mills, MD	Our Lady of Good Counsel	5 ft 7 in (1.70 m)	N/A	Sep 19, 2024
Caliyah DeVillasee; PG	Recruit ratings: 247Sports: ESPN: (93)				
Overall recruit ranking:
Note: In many cases, Scout, Rivals, 247Sports, On3, and ESPN may conflict in their listings of height and weight.; In these cases, the average was taken. ESPN grades are on a 100-point scale.; Sources: "2025 Player Commits". ESPN. Archived from the original on November 25, 2024.

== Roster ==
2025–26 Cincinnati Bearcats women's basketball team
Players
Coaches

Pos.	#	Name	Height	Year	Previous school	Hometown
G	1	Mya Perry	5 ft 11 in (1.8 m)	Sr	Reynoldsburg; Florida Atlantic	Reynoldsburg, OH
G	2	Paige Whitted	5 ft 9 in (1.75 m)	Fr	Briarcrest Christian Academy	Memphis, TN
G	3	Reagan Jackson	5 ft 8 in (1.73 m)	Jr	Kennedale	Kennedale, TX
G	4	Caliyah DeVillasee	5 ft 8 in (1.73 m)	Fr	Our Lady of Good Counsel	Owings Mills, MD
G	8	Joya Crawford	5 ft 8 in (1.73 m)	Fr	Dyersburg	Dyersburg, TN
G	9	Dee Alexander	6 ft 2 in (1.88 m)	Fr	Purcell Marian	Cincinnati, OH
F	10	Kylie Torrence	6 ft 2 in (1.88 m)	Fr	Winston Salem Christian	High Point, NC
F	14	Ramiyah Byrd	5 ft 11 in (1.8 m)	RS So	Spire Institute and Academy	Colorado Springs, CO
F	21	Kali Barrett	6 ft 2 in (1.88 m)	Fr	Cardinal Mooney	Bradenton, FL
F	25	Alliance Ndiba	6 ft 3 in (1.91 m)	RS Sr	Arizona Western College	Lubumbashi, Congo
C	32	Destiny Thomas	6 ft 4 in (1.93 m)	Sr	Jonesboro; Memphis	Jonesboro, AR
C	33	Delaney Snyder	6 ft 5 in (1.96 m)	Jr	TPLS Christian Academy	Richmond, VA
C	42	Mary Carden	6 ft 6 in (1.98 m)	So	Idabel; Oral Roberts	Idabel, OK

Head coach

- Katrina Merriweather (Cincinnati)

Assistant coach(es)

- Ashley Barlow (Notre Dame)
- Abby Jump (Wright State)
- Kabrina Merriweather (Florida A&M)

Legend

- (C) Team captain
- (S) Suspended
- (I) Ineligible
- (W) Walk-on
- Injured
- Current redshirt

Roster

== Schedule and results ==
Date time, TV	Rank^{#}	Opponent^{#}	Result	Record	High points	High rebounds	High assists	Site (attendance) city, state
Exhibition
October 27, 2025*; 6:30 p.m.		Taylor	W 104–67		21 – Perry	13 – Torrence	7 – DeVillasee	Fifth Third Arena; Cincinnati, OH
Non-conference regular season
November 4, 2025*; 6:30 p.m., ESPN+		Lehigh	L 85–88	0–1	31 – Perry	8 – Thomas	6 – Crawford	Fifth Third Arena (814); Cincinnati, OH
November 7, 2025*; 6:00 p.m., B1G+		at Penn State	L 77–82	0–2	18 – Torrence	6 – Torrence	4 – DeVillasee	Rec Hall (1,609); State College, PA
November 11, 2025*; 7:00 p.m., ESPN+		at Saint Joseph's	L 65–70	0–3	19 – Perry	8 – Torrence	5 – DeVillasee	Hagan Arena (895); Philadelphia, PA
November 16, 2025*; 12:00 p.m., ESPN+		Georgetown (KY)	W 100–61	1–3	23 – Perry	9 – Tied	15 – DeVillasee	Fifth Third Arena (902); Cincinnati, OH
November 20, 2025*; 6:30 p.m., ESPN+		Ball State	L 63–83	1–4	21 – DeVillasee	6 – Ndiba	2 – Tied	Fifth Third Arena (1,532); Cincinnati, OH
November 23, 2025*; 2:00 p.m., ESPN+		Canisius	W 96–57	2–4	23 – Jackson	11 – Byrd	10 – DeVillasee	Fifth Third Arena (1,440); Cincinnati, OH
November 28, 2025*; 3:00 p.m.		vs. Alabama A&M; Florida Gulf Classic Challenge	W 72–49	3–4	25 – Perry	8 – Thomas	3 – Tied	Hertz Arena (281); Naples, FL
November 29, 2025*; 3:00 p.m.		vs. New Mexico; Florida Gulf Classic Challenge	W 63–60	4–4	16 – Perry	7 – Tied	4 – DeVillasee	Hertz Arena (173); Naples, FL
December 3, 2025*; 11:30 a.m., ESPN+		Miami (OH)	L 71–75	4–5	23 – DeVillasee	11 – Torrence	4 – DeVillasee	Fifth Third Arena (2,949); Cincinnati, OH
December 7, 2025*; 2:00 p.m., ESPN+		Xavier; Crosstown Shootout	L 70–77	4–6	20 – DeVillasee	8 – Torrence	5 – Perry	Fifth Third Arena (4,059); Cincinnati, OH
December 13, 2025*; 2:00 p.m., ESPN+		UNLV	W 65–48	5–6	18 – Ndiba	13 – Ndiba	3 – Barrett	Fifth Third Arena (381); Cincinnati, OH
December 16, 2025*; 6:30 p.m., ESPN+		Howard	L 64–66	5–7	19 – Perry	11 – Torrence	4 – Tied	Fifth Third Arena (1,450); Cincinnati, OH
Big 12 regular season
December 21, 2025; 2:00 p.m., ESPN+		Oklahoma State	L 63–91	5–8 (0–1)	21 – Perry	7 – Tied	3 – Whitted	Fifth Third Arena (1,184); Cincinnati, OH
December 31, 2025; 2:00 p.m., ESPN+		at Kansas State	L 52–79	5–9 (0–2)	14 – Perry	16 – Torrence	2 – Ndiba	Bramlage Coliseum (4,519); Manhattan, KS
January 3, 2026; 3:00 p.m., ESPN+		at Colorado	L 68–79	5–10 (0–3)	17 – DeVillasee	11 – Torrence	5 – DeVillasee	CU Events Center (2,406); Boulder, CO
January 7, 2026; 6:30 p.m., ESPN+		No. 11 Iowa State	W 71–63	6–10 (1–3)	26 – Perry	9 – Torrence	2 – Tied	Fifth Third Arena (3,012); Cincinnati, OH
January 10, 2026; 2:00 p.m., ESPN+		No. 17 Texas Tech	L 60–71	6–11 (1–4)	14 – DeVillasee	8 – Torrence	4 – Perry	Fifth Third Arena (2,086); Cincinnati, OH
January 14, 2026; 7:00 p.m., ESPN+		at UCF	W 63–59 ^{OT}	7–11 (2–4)	24 – Perry	9 – Torrence	3 – DeVillasee	Addition Financial Arena (1,076); Orlando, FL
January 18, 2026; 2:00 p.m., ESPN+		West Virginia	L 76–84	7–12 (2–5)	18 – Perry	5 – Alexander	6 – Jackson	Fifth Third Arena (2,108); Cincinnati, OH
January 21, 2026; 7:30 p.m., ESPN+		at Iowa State	L 68–93	7–13 (2–6)	20 – Torrence	6 – Torrence	4 – DeVillasee	Hilton Coliseum (9,083); Ames, IA
January 24, 2026; 2:00 p.m., ESPN+		Arizona State	W 66–64	8–13 (3–6)	15 – DeVillasee	9 – Torrence	3 – DeVillasee	Fifth Third Arena (2,221); Cincinnati, OH
February 1, 2026; 3:00 p.m., ESPN+		at Houston	L 70–72	8–14 (3–7)	21 – DeVillasee	8 – Torrence	2 – Tied	Fertitta Center (1,180); Houston, TX
February 4, 2026; 6:30 p.m., ESPN+		No. 15 Baylor	L 70–76	8–15 (3–8)	20 – Perry	5 – Tied	4 – Tied	Fifth Third Arena (1,674); Cincinnati, OH
February 7, 2026; 5:30 p.m., ESPN+		at Kansas	L 71–80	8–16 (3–9)	25 – Perry	7 – Byrd	3 – Tied	Allen Fieldhouse (6,171); Lawrence, KS
February 10, 2026; 6:30 p.m., ESPN+		Arizona	W 77–61	9–16 (4–9)	19 – Jackson	15 – Byrd	4 – Crawford	Fifth Third Arena (1,748); Cincinnati, OH
February 14, 2026; 7:00 p.m., ESPN+		at Utah	L 59–67	9–17 (4–10)	13 – DeVillasee	8 – Thomas	5 – DeVillasee	Jon M. Huntsman Center (3,315); Salt Lake City, UT
February 17, 2026; 9:00 p.m., ESPN+		at BYU	W 76–67	10–17 (5–10)	32 – Perry	7 – Torrence	4 – Jackson	Marriott Center (2,702); Provo, UT
February 21, 2026; 2:00 p.m., ESPN+		UCF	W 73–60	11–17 (6–10)	15 – Perry	8 – Torrence	5 – DeVillasee	Fifth Third Arena (2,887); Cincinnati, OH
February 25, 2026; 6:30 p.m., ESPN+		No. 11 TCU	L 70–83	11–18 (6–11)	27 – Perry	7 – Alexander	3 – Torrence	Fifth Third Arena (2,307); Cincinnati, OH
March 1, 2026; 2:00 p.m., ESPN+		at No. 17 West Virginia	L 60–118	11–19 (6–12)	19 – Perry	6 – Tied	4 – DeVillasee	Hope Coliseum (6,095); Morgantown, WV
Big 12 Tournament
March 4, 2026; 12:00 p.m., ESPN+	(13)	vs. (12) Kansas State; First Round	L 66–91	11–20	23 – Perry	9 – Byrd	3 – Tied	T-Mobile Center (4,328); Kansas City, MO
*Non-conference game. ^{#}Rankings from AP Poll. (#) Tournament seedings in parentheses. All times are in Eastern Time.

== See also ==
- 2025–26 Cincinnati Bearcats men's basketball team
