= 2025–26 West Virginia Mountaineers women's basketball team =

2025–26 West Virginia Mountaineers women's basketball

Big 12 tournament champions

NCAA tournament, Second Round
- Conference: Big 12 Conference

Ranking
- Coaches: No. 16
- AP: No. 18
- Record: 28–7 (14–4 Big 12)
- Head coach: Mark Kellogg (3rd season)
- Associate head coach: JC Carter
- Assistant coaches: Erin Grant; Jessica Grayson; Kasondra McKay; Caden Roberts
- Home arena: Hope Coliseum

2025–26 Big 12 women's basketball standings
	Conf.				Overall
Team	W		L	PCT	W		L	PCT
No. 6 TCU	15	–	3	.833	32	–	6	.842
No. 18 West Virginia †	14	–	4	.778	28	–	7	.800
No. 23 Baylor	13	–	5	.722	25	–	9	.735
Oklahoma State	12	–	6	.667	24	–	10	.706
Texas Tech	12	–	6	.667	26	–	8	.765
Colorado	11	–	7	.611	22	–	12	.647
Iowa State	10	–	8	.556	22	–	10	.688
Utah	10	–	8	.556	19	–	13	.594
BYU	9	–	9	.500	26	–	12	.684
Arizona State	9	–	9	.500	24	–	11	.686
Kansas	8	–	10	.444	22	–	14	.611
Kansas State	8	–	10	.444	19	–	18	.514
Cincinnati	6	–	12	.333	11	–	20	.355
UCF	3	–	15	.167	11	–	19	.367
Arizona	3	–	15	.167	12	–	18	.400
Houston	1	–	17	.056	7	–	23	.233
† 2026 Big 12 tournament winner Rankings from AP poll

The 2025–26 West Virginia Mountaineers women's basketball team currently represents West Virginia University during the 2025–26 NCAA Division I women's basketball season. The Mountaineers, led by third year head coach Mark Kellogg, play their home games at the Hope Coliseum as members of the Big 12 Conference.

== Previous season ==
The Mountaineers finished the 2024–25 season 25–8, 13–5 in Big 12 play to finish in a three-way tie for fourth place. As the No. 4 seed in the Big 12 Tournament, they defeated Kansas State before losing to TCU in the semifinals. They received an at-large bid to the NCAA tournament as a No. 6 seed in the Birmingham regional 3 where they defeated Columbia in the first round before losing to North Carolina in the second round.

== Offseason ==
=== Departures ===
West Virginia Departures
Name	Number	Pos.	Height	Year	Hometown	Reason for Departure
Destiny Aqubata	4	G	5'11"	Freshman	Moreno Valley, CA	Transferred to Georgetown
Danelle Arigbabu	8	F	6'4"	Senior	Berlin, Germany	Transferred to Virginia
JJ Quinerly	11	G	5'8"	Senior	Norfolk, VA	Graduated/2025 WNBA draft; selected 27th overall by Dallas Wings
Kylee Blacksten	14	F	6'3"	Graduate Student	Colorado Springs, CO	Graduated
Feryal Defne Atli	17	F	6'3"	Freshman	Mersin, Turkey	Transferred to Appalachian State
Zya Nugent	22	G	5'7"	(redshirt) Senior	Denison, TX	Transferred to Saint Louis
Ashala Moseberry	24	G	5'10"	(redshirt) Junior	Madison, WI	Transferred
Kyah Watson	32	G	5'10"	(redshirt) Senior	Rapid City, SD	Graduated
Tirzah Moore	33	F	6'0"	Senior	Oklahoma City, OK	Graduated

=== Incoming ===
West Virginia Incoming Transfers
Name	Num	Pos.	Height	Year	Hometown	Previous School
Carter McCray	1	C	6'1"	Junior	Oberlin, OH	Wisconsin
Gia Cooke	3	G	5'9"	(redshirt) Junior	Clinton, MD	Houston
Riley Makalusky	21	G/F	6'2"	Junior	Fishers, IN	Butler
Kierra Wheeler	22	F	6'1"	Graduate Student	Minneapolis, MN	Norfolk State
Loghan Johnson	25	G	5'10"	Junior	Houston, TX	Texas Tech

==== Recruiting ====
College recruiting
Name	Hometown	School	Height	Weight	Commit date
Madison Parrish; G	Mason, OH	Mason High School	5 ft 11 in (1.80 m)	N/A	
Madison Parrish; G	Recruit ratings: ESPN: (91)				
Overall recruit ranking:
Note: In many cases, Scout, Rivals, 247Sports, On3, and ESPN may conflict in their listings of height and weight.; In these cases, the average was taken. ESPN grades are on a 100-point scale.; Sources: "2025 Player Commits". ESPN. Archived from the original on November 1, 2025.

== Roster ==
2025–26 West Virginia Mountaineers women's basketball team
Players
Coaches

Pos.	#	Name	Height	Year	Previous school	Hometown
F	1	Carter McCray	6 ft 1 in (1.85 m)	Jr	Elyria Catholic HS; Wisconsin	Oberlin, OH
G	2	Sydney Woodley	5 ft 8 in (1.73 m)	GS	Paloma HS; Long Beach State	Menifee, CA
G	3	Gia Cooke	5 ft 8 in (1.73 m)	RS Jr	Bishop McNamara HS; Maryland	Clinton, MD
F	4	Madison Parrish	5 ft 11 in (1.8 m)	Fr	William Mason HS	Mason, OH
G	5	Sydney Shaw	5 ft 9 in (1.75 m)	Sr	DME Academy; Auburn	Miami, FL
G	10	Jordan Harrison	5 ft 6 in (1.68 m)	Sr	Classen SAS; Stephen F. Austin	Oklahoma City, OK
F	21	Riley Makalusky	6 ft 2 in (1.88 m)	Jr	Hamilton Southeastern HS; Butler	Fishers, IN
F	22	Kierra Wheeler	6 ft 1 in (1.85 m)	GS	Robbinsdale Cooper HS; Norfolk State	Minneapolis, MN
F	23	Jordan Thomas	6 ft 3 in (1.91 m)	So	Hebron HS	Carrollton, TX
G	25	Loghan Johnson	5 ft 10 in (1.78 m)	Jr	Houston Christian HS; Texas Tech	Houston, TX
F	37	Célia Riviére	6 ft 3 in (1.91 m)	Sr	Lattes Montpellier; Northwest Florida State	Paris, France

Head coach

- Mark Kellogg (Austin College)

Assistant coach(es)

- JC Carter (Southwest Baptist)
- Jessica Grayson (Austin Peay)
- Erin Grant (Texas Tech)
- Kassondra McKay (Louisiana Tech)
- Caden Roberts (West Virginia)

Legend

- (C) Team captain
- (S) Suspended
- (I) Ineligible
- (W) Walk-on
- Injured
- Current redshirt

Roster

== Schedule and results ==
Date time, TV	Rank^{#}	Opponent^{#}	Result	Record	High points	High rebounds	High assists	Site (attendance) city, state
Exhibition
October 26, 2025*; 6:30 p.m.		Fairmont State	W 95–43		–	–	–	Hope Coliseum; Morgantown, WV
Non-conference regular season
November 3, 2025*; 7:00 p.m., ESPN+		Purdue Fort Wayne	W 83–47	1–0	15 – Harrison	9 – McCray	3 – Cooke	Hope Coliseum (2,534); Morgantown, WV
November 7, 2025*; 7:00 p.m., ESPN+		Kent State	W 88–47	2–0	23 – Shaw	7 – Woodley	5 – Harrison	Hope Coliseum (2,954); Morgantown, WV
November 11, 2025*; 7:00 p.m., ESPN+		Temple	W 89–61	3–0	16 – Tied	10 – Shaw	7 – Harrison	Hope Coliseum (2,516); Morgantown, WV
November 14, 2025*; 7:00 p.m., ESPNU		vs. No. 15 Duke; Greenbrier Tip-Off	W 57–49	4–0	16 – Shaw	8 – Riviere	3 – Tied	Colonial Hall (1,200); White Sulphur Springs, WV
November 20, 2025*; 10:15 a.m., ESPN+	No. 23	Appalachian State	W 80–51	5–0	19 – Cooke	5 – Tied	4 – Shaw	Hope Coliseum (10,067); Morgantown, WV
November 24, 2025*; 1:30 p.m., FloCollege	No. 21	vs. McNeese; Pink Flamingo Championship Goombay Division semifinals	W 83–63	6–0	24 – Cooke	10 – Wheeler	7 – Harrison	Baha Mar Convention Center (277); Nassau, Bahamas
November 26, 2025*; 1:30 p.m., FloCollege	No. 21	vs. Ohio State; Pink Flamingo Championship Goombay Division finals	L 81–83	6–1	24 – Cooke	14 – Wheeler	4 – Tied	Baha Mar Convention Center (237); Nassau, Bahamas
December 1, 2025*; 7:00 p.m., ESPN+	No. 25	Villanova	L 59–81	6–2	20 – Cooke	2 – Wheeler	6 – Tied	Hope Coliseum (2,661); Morgantown, WV
December 5, 2025*; 7:00 p.m., ESPN+	No. 25	Mercyhurst	W 97–51	7–2	19 – Harrison	8 – Wheeler	6 – Shaw	Hope Coliseum (2,816); Morgantown, WV
December 8, 2025*; 7:00 p.m., ESPN+		Texas Southern	W 109–40	8–2	23 – Wheeler	8 – Wheeler	7 – Harrison	Hope Coliseum (2,418); Morgantown, WV
December 11, 2025*; 7:00 p.m., ESPN+		Georgia Tech	W 82–50	9–2	23 – Cooke	11 – Wheeler	6 – Harrison	Hope Coliseum (2,935); Morgantown, WV
December 14, 2025*; 3:00 p.m., SECN+/ESPN+		at Texas A&M	W 63–45	10–2	16 – Wheeler	10 – Wheeler	3 – Tied	Reed Arena (3,498); College Station, TX
Big 12 Conference Regular Season
December 21, 2025; 2:00 p.m., ESPN+		Houston	W 101–46	11–2 (1–0)	22 – Shaw	7 – McCray	6 – Harrison	Hope Coliseum (3,968); Morgantown, WV
January 1, 2026; 1:00 p.m., ESPN+		at Kansas	W 79–72	12–2 (2–0)	24 – Cooke	7 – McCray	6 – Harrison	Allen Fieldhouse (4,149); Lawrence, KS
January 4, 2026; 2:00 p.m., ESPN+		at Kansas State	W 60–58	13–2 (3–0)	18 – Wheeler	10 – Wheeler	10 – Harrison	Bramlage Coliseum (3,819); Manhattan, KS
January 7, 2026; 7:00 p.m., ESPN+		No. 17 Texas Tech	L 66–71	13–3 (3–1)	22 – Harrison	9 – Wheeler	5 – Harrison	Hope Coliseum (3,196); Morgantown, WV
January 11, 2026; 3:00 p.m., ESPN+		at No. 11 Iowa State	W 83–70	14–3 (4–1)	25 – Wheeler	7 – Wheeler	8 – Harrison	Hilton Coliseum (10,009); Ames, IA
January 14, 2026; 7:00 p.m., ESPN+		No. 10 TCU	L 50–51	14–4 (4–2)	19 – Harrison	10 – Wheeler	2 – Tied	Hope Coliseum (3,733); Morgantown, WV
January 18, 2026; 2:00 p.m., ESPN+		at Cincinnati	W 84–76	15–4 (5–2)	17 – Wheeler	7 – McCray	8 – Harrison	Fifth Third Arena (2,108); Cincinnati, OH
January 21, 2026; 7:00 p.m., ESPN+	No. 22	Arizona State	W 53–43	16–4 (6–2)	16 – Wheeler	7 – Wheeler	3 – Tied	Hope Coliseum (3,197); Morgantown, WV
January 24, 2026; 9:30 p.m., ESPN+	No. 22	at BYU	W 91–77	17–4 (7–2)	23 – Woodley	11 – McCray	6 – Harrison	Marriott Center (3,256); Provo, UT
January 27, 2026; 9:00 p.m., ESPN+	No. 22	at Utah	L 64–71	17–5 (7–3)	18 – Harrison	7 – Tied	8 – Harrison	Jon M. Huntsman Center (2,352); Salt Lake City, UT
February 1, 2026; 12:00 p.m., ESPN	No. 22	No. 14 Baylor	W 70–60	18–5 (8–3)	18 – Tied	15 – Wheeler	3 – Tied	Hope Coliseum (6,034); Morgantown, WV
February 4, 2026; 9:00 p.m., ESPN+	No. 20	at Colorado	W 61–55	19–5 (9–3)	18 – Harrison	10 – McCray	2 – Tied	CU Events Center (2,097); Boulder, CO
February 7, 2026; 2:00 p.m., ESPN+	No. 20	Arizona	W 87–68	20–5 (10–3)	17 – Wheeler	6 – Wheeler	5 – Harrison	Hope Coliseum (4,160); Morgantown, WV
February 11, 2026; 7:00 p.m., ESPN+	No. 19	UCF	W 106–56	21–5 (11–3)	20 – Makalusky	9 – Tied	8 – Harrison	Hope Coliseum (3,011); Morgantown, WV
February 15, 2026; 8:00 p.m., FS1	No. 19	at No. 17 TCU	L 50–59	21–6 (11–4)	18 – Cooke	8 – Riviére	4 – Tied	Schollmaier Arena (4,931); Fort Worth, TX
February 21, 2026; 2:00 p.m., ESPN+	No. 19	Oklahoma State	W 72–40	22–6 (12–4)	21 – Cooke	10 – Wheeler	7 – Harrison	Hope Coliseum (5,052); Morgantown, WV
February 25, 2026; 7:00 p.m., ESPN+	No. 17	at UCF	W 74–62	23–6 (13–4)	19 – Cooke	7 – Tied	7 – Harrison	Addition Financial Arena (1,789); Orlando, FL
March 1, 2026; 2:00 p.m., ESPN+	No. 17	Cincinnati	W 118–60	24–6 (14–4)	24 – Shaw	10 – Wheeler	10 – Harrison	Hope Coliseum (6,095); Morgantown, WV
Big 12 Tournament
March 6, 2026; 6:30 p.m., ESPN+	(2) No. 15	vs. (10) Arizona State; Quarterfinals	W 67–54	25–6	19 – Shaw	8 – Wheeler	5 – Harrison	T-Mobile Center (4,771); Kansas City, MO
March 7, 2026; 6:30 p.m., ESPN+	(2) No. 15	vs. (6) Colorado; Semifinals	W 48–47	26–6	15 – Harrison	10 – Wheeler	1 – Tied	T-Mobile Center (6,905); Kansas City, MO
March 8, 2026; 5:00 p.m., ESPN	(2) No. 15	vs. (1) No. 10 TCU; Championship	W 62–53	27–6	21 – Harrison	8 – Wheeler	4 – Harrison	T-Mobile Center (5,857); Kansas City, MO
NCAA Women's Tournament
March 21, 2026*; 5:00 p.m., ESPNU	(4 FW3) No. 11	(13 FW3) Miami (OH); First Round	W 82–54	28–6	19 – Shaw	9 – Shaw	8 – Harrison	Hope Coliseum (13,504); Morgantown, WV
March 23, 2026*; 5:00 p.m., ESPN2	(4 FW3) No. 11	(5 FW3) No. 16 Kentucky; Second Round	L 73–74	28–7	23 – Tied	5 – Wheeler	4 – Harrison	Hope Coliseum (12,830); Morgantown, WV
*Non-conference game. ^{#}Rankings from AP Poll. (#) Tournament seedings in parentheses. FW3=Fort Worth 3. All times are in Eastern Time.

== Rankings ==
Ranking movements Legend: ██ Increase in ranking ██ Decrease in ranking — = Not ranked RV = Received votes
	Week																				
Poll	Pre	1	2	3	4	5	6	7	8	9	10	11	12	13	14	15	16	17	18	19	Final
AP	RV	RV	23	21	25	RV	—	—	—*	RV	RV	22	22	20	19	19	17	15	12	11	18
Coaches	RV	RV	22	20	RV	—	RV	RV	RV	RV	25	22	21	20	20	19	17	15	13	13	16

*AP did not release a week 8 poll.

== See also ==
- 2025–26 West Virginia Mountaineers men's basketball team
