= 2025–26 Iowa State Cyclones women's basketball team =

American college basketball season

2025–26 Iowa State Cyclones women's basketball

Coconut Hoops Blue Heron Division champions

NCAA tournament, First Round
- Conference: Big 12 Conference
- Record: 22–10 (10–8 Big 12)
- Head coach: Bill Fennelly (31st season)
- Associate head coach: Jodi Steyer
- Assistant coaches: Latoja Schaben; Billy Fennelly; Emily Hatfield; Rob Jenkins
- Home arena: Hilton Coliseum

2025–26 Big 12 women's basketball standings
	Conf.				Overall
Team	W		L	PCT	W		L	PCT
No. 6 TCU	15	–	3	.833	32	–	6	.842
No. 18 West Virginia †	14	–	4	.778	28	–	7	.800
No. 23 Baylor	13	–	5	.722	25	–	9	.735
Oklahoma State	12	–	6	.667	24	–	10	.706
Texas Tech	12	–	6	.667	26	–	8	.765
Colorado	11	–	7	.611	22	–	12	.647
Iowa State	10	–	8	.556	22	–	10	.688
Utah	10	–	8	.556	19	–	13	.594
BYU	9	–	9	.500	26	–	12	.684
Arizona State	9	–	9	.500	24	–	11	.686
Kansas	8	–	10	.444	22	–	14	.611
Kansas State	8	–	10	.444	19	–	18	.514
Cincinnati	6	–	12	.333	11	–	20	.355
UCF	3	–	15	.167	11	–	19	.367
Arizona	3	–	15	.167	12	–	18	.400
Houston	1	–	17	.056	7	–	23	.233
† 2026 Big 12 tournament winner Rankings from AP poll

The 2025–26 Iowa State Cyclones women's basketball team represented Iowa State University during the 2025–26 NCAA Division I women's basketball season. The Cyclones, led by thirty-first-year head coach Bill Fennelly, played their home games at the Hilton Coliseum in Ames, Iowa as members of the Big 12 Conference.

== Previous season ==
The Cyclones finished the 2024–25 season 23–12, 12–6 in Big 12 play, to finish in seventh place. As No. 7 seed in the Big 12 women's tournament, they defeated Arizona State in the second round before losing to Baylor in the quarterfinals. They received an at-large bid to the NCAA tournament as a No. 11 seed in the Birmingham Region 3, where they defeated Princeton in the first four before losing to Michigan in the first round.

== Offseason ==
=== Departures ===
Iowa State departures
Name	Number	Pos.	Height	Year	Hometown	Reason for departure
Lily Hansford	6	G	6'2"	Junior	DePere, WI	Transferred to Green Bay
Emily Ryan	11	G	5'11"	Graduate student	Claflin, KS	Graduated
Kelsey Joens	23	G	5'10"	Sophomore	Iowa City, IA	Transferred to Villanova

=== Incoming ===
Iowa State incoming transfers
Name	Num	Pos.	Height	Year	Hometown	Previous school
Evangelia Paulk	5	F/G	6'0"	Junior	Asheville, NC	Wofford
Jada Williams	8	G	5'8"	Junior	Kansas City, MO	Arizona

==== Recruiting ====
College recruiting
Name	Hometown	School	Height	Weight	Commit date
Reese Beaty; PG	Jamestown, TN	Alvin C York Institute	5 ft 8 in (1.73 m)	N/A	Apr 6, 2024
Reese Beaty; PG	Recruit ratings: 247Sports:				
Overall recruit ranking:
Note: In many cases, Scout, Rivals, 247Sports, On3, and ESPN may conflict in their listings of height and weight.; In these cases, the average was taken. ESPN grades are on a 100-point scale.; Sources: "2025 Player Commits". ESPN. Archived from the original on October 6, 2025.

==== Recruiting class of 2026 ====
College recruiting (2026)
Name	Hometown	School	Height	Weight	Commit date
Macy Comito; PG	Carlisle, IA	Carlisle High School	5 ft 8 in (1.73 m)	N/A	
Macy Comito; PG	Recruit ratings: ESPN: (91)				
Overall recruit ranking:
Note: In many cases, Scout, Rivals, 247Sports, On3, and ESPN may conflict in their listings of height and weight.; In these cases, the average was taken. ESPN grades are on a 100-point scale.; Sources: "2026 Player Commits". ESPN. Archived from the original on October 6, 2025.

== Roster ==
2025–26 Iowa State Cyclones women's basketball team
Players
Coaches

Pos.	#	Name	Height	Year	Previous school	Hometown
G	1	Reese Beaty	5 ft 8 in (1.73 m)	Fr	York Institute	Jamestown, TN
G	2	Arianna Jackson	5 ft 9 in (1.75 m)	Jr	Roosevelt	Des Moines, IA
F	3	Alisa Williams	6 ft 2 in (1.88 m)	RS Jr	LSU	Denton, TX
G	5	Evangelia Paulk	6 ft 0 in (1.83 m)	Jr	Wofford	Asheville, NC
G	7	Freya Jensen	5 ft 10 in (1.78 m)	Fr	Risskov Gymnasium	Risskov, Denmark
G	8	Jada Williams	5 ft 8 in (1.73 m)	Jr	Arizona	Kansas City, MO
F/C	9	Lilly Taulelei	6 ft 3 in (1.91 m)	Jr	UMass	Wellington, New Zealand
G	12	Mackenzie Hare	5 ft 9 in (1.75 m)	RS Jr	Marquette	Naperville, IL
G	22	Reagan Wilson	5 ft 8 in (1.73 m)	So	Noblesville	Noblesville, IN
F	24	Addy Brown	6 ft 2 in (1.88 m)	Jr	Derby	Derby, KS
G/F	25	Sydney Harris	6 ft 1 in (1.85 m)	Sr	TCU	Edwardsville, IL
G	32	Aili Tanke	5 ft 11 in (1.8 m)	So	Johnston	Johnston, IA
C	55	Audi Crooks	6 ft 3 in (1.91 m)	Jr	Bishop Garrigan	Algona, IA

Head coach

- Bill Fennelly (William Penn)

Assistant coach(es)

- Jodi Steyer (Colorado State)
- Latoja Schaben (Toledo)
- Billy Fennelly (Iowa State)
- Emily Hatfield (Western Carolina)
- Rob Jenkins (North Carolina)

Legend

- (C) Team captain
- (S) Suspended
- (I) Ineligible
- (W) Walk-on
- Injured
- Current redshirt

Roster

== Schedule and results ==
Date time, TV	Rank^{#}	Opponent^{#}	Result	Record	High points	High rebounds	High assists	Site (attendance) city, state
Exhibition
October 28, 2025*; 6:30 p.m.	No. 14	UW–Oshkosh	W 84–53		24 – Crooks	7 – Crooks	7 – J. Williams	Hilton Coliseum (8,985); Ames, IA
Non-conference regular season
November 3, 2025*; 11:00 a.m., ESPN+	No. 14	St. Thomas	W 85–36	1–0	20 – Crooks	6 – Brown	6 – Brown	Hilton Coliseum (10,012); Ames, IA
November 5, 2025*; 6:30 p.m., ESPN+	No. 14	Southern	W 85–58	2–0	29 – Crooks	14 – Crooks	8 – Brown	Hilton Coliseum (8,908); Ames, IA
November 9, 2025*; 1:00 p.m., ESPN+	No. 14	Sacred Heart	W 99–34	3–0	21 – Crooks	9 – Brown	8 – J. Williams	Hilton Coliseum (8,977); Ames, IA
November 12, 2025*; 6:30 p.m., ESPN+	No. 16	Valparaiso	W 97–50	4–0	43 – Crooks	7 – Tied	10 – J. Williams	Hilton Coliseum (8,954); Ames, IA
November 16, 2025*; 1:00 p.m., ESPN+	No. 16	Norfolk State	W 98–52	5–0	19 – Crooks	12 – A. Williams	11 – Brown	Hilton Coliseum (9,145); Ames, IA
November 20, 2025*; 6:00 p.m., ESPN+	No. 12	at Drake	W 87–60	6–0	22 – Crooks	15 – Brown	7 – Brown	Knapp Center (4,026); Des Moines, IA
November 23, 2025*; 1:00 p.m., ESPN+	No. 12	Mercyhurst	W 112–62	7–0	27 – Crooks	9 – Brown	8 – J. Williams	Hilton Coliseum (9,581); Ames, IA
November 28, 2025*; 10:00 a.m., FloHoops	No. 10	vs. Marquette; Coconut Hoops Blue Heron Division semifinals	W 84–73	8–0	18 – Tied	11 – J. Williams	6 – Brown	Alico Arena (553); Fort Myers, FL
November 30, 2025*; 12:30 p.m., FloHoops	No. 10	vs. Indiana; Coconut Hoops Blue Heron Division Championship Game	W 106–95	9–0	47 – Crooks	10 – Brown	11 – J. Williams	Alico Arena (744); Fort Myers, FL
December 7, 2025*; 1:00 p.m., ESPN+	No. 10	Northern Illinois	W 105–52	10–0	30 – Crooks	8 – Brown	9 – Brown	Hilton Coliseum (9,538); Ames, IA
December 10, 2025*; 6:00 p.m., ESPN	No. 10	No. 11 Iowa; Rivalry/Iowa Corn Cy-Hawk Series/Jimmy V Classic	W 74–69	11–0	30 – Crooks	12 – Brown	12 – J. Williams	Hilton Coliseum (14,009); Ames, IA
December 14, 2025*; 5:00 p.m., ESPN+	No. 10	Northern Iowa	W 81–53	12–0	28 – Brown	12 – Brown	8 – J. Williams	Hilton Coliseum (10,032); Ames, IA
Big 12 Conference regular season
December 21, 2025; 12:00 p.m., ESPN2	No. 10	Kansas	W 79–76	13–0 (1–0)	41 – Crooks	8 – Brown	10 – J. Williams	Hilton Coliseum (10,699); Ames, IA
December 31, 2025; 1:00 p.m., ESPN+	No. 10	at Houston	W 80–62	14–0 (2–0)	35 – Crooks	13 – Crooks	14 – J. Williams	Fertitta Center (1,652); Houston, TX
January 4, 2026; 4:00 p.m., ESPN2	No. 10	No. 22 Baylor	L 70–72	14–1 (2–1)	28 – J. Williams	10 – Crooks	8 – Brown	Hilton Coliseum (10,832); Ames, IA
January 7, 2026; 5:30 p.m., ESPN+	No. 11	at Cincinnati	L 63–71	14–2 (2–2)	23 – Crooks	10 – Crooks	7 – J. Williams	Fifth Third Arena (3,012); Cincinnati, OH
January 11, 2026; 2:00 p.m., ESPN+	No. 11	West Virginia	L 70–83	14–3 (2–3)	22 – Crooks	10 – Crooks	9 – J. Williams	Hilton Coliseum (10,009); Ames, IA
January 14, 2026; 8:00 p.m., ESPN+	No. 19	at Colorado	L 62–68	14–4 (2–4)	17 – Crooks	15 – Crooks	5 – J. Williams	CU Events Center (4,183); Boulder, CO
January 18, 2026; 12:00 p.m., FOX	No. 19	at Oklahoma State	L 58–86	14–5 (2–5)	15 – Tied	7 – Crooks	7 – J. Williams	Gallagher-Iba Arena (3,941); Stillwater, OK
January 21, 2026; 6:30 p.m., ESPN+		Cincinnati	W 93–68	15–5 (3–5)	44 – J. Williams	8 – Jackson	8 – J. Williams	Hilton Coliseum (9,083); Ames, IA
January 24, 2026; 3:00 p.m., FS1		Arizona	W 90–65	16–5 (4–5)	19 – J. Williams	7 – A. Williams	7 – J. Williams	Hilton Coliseum (10,165); Ames, IA
January 28, 2026; 6:00 p.m., ESPN+		at No. 21 Texas Tech	W 84–70	17–5 (5–5)	33 – Crooks	12 – Crooks	9 – J. Williams	United Supermarkets Arena (5,216); Lubbock, TX
January 31, 2026; 2:00 p.m., ESPN+		UCF	W 65–52	18–5 (6–5)	23 – J. Williams	13 – Crooks	6 – Beaty	Hilton Coliseum (10,125); Ames, IA
February 7, 2026; 6:00 p.m., ESPN+		at Utah	W 79–72	19–5 (7–5)	26 – Crooks	8 – Crooks	7 – J. Williams	Jon M. Huntsman Center (3,170); Salt Lake City, UT
February 10, 2026; 8:00 p.m., ESPN+		at BYU	L 69–83	19–6 (7–6)	18 – Crooks	7 – Harris	5 – Beaty	Marriott Center (2,279); Provo, UT
February 15, 2026; 1:00 p.m., ESPN2		Kansas State	W 76–72	20–6 (8–6)	22 – J. Williams	9 – Crooks	9 – J. Williams	Hilton Coliseum (10,746); Ames, IA
February 18, 2026; 6:30 p.m., ESPN+		Arizona State	W 90–64	21–6 (9–6)	28 – Crooks	12 – Crooks	8 – J. Williams	Hilton Coliseum (9,232); Ames, IA
February 22, 2026; 3:00 p.m., ESPN		at No. 12 TCU	L 73–80	21–7 (9–7)	22 – Crooks	7 – Tied	11 – J. Williams	Schollmaier Arena (5,381); Fort Worth, TX
February 25, 2026; 6:30 p.m., ESPN+		Oklahoma State	L 77–88	21–8 (9–8)	19 – Tied	7 – Crooks	10 – J. Williams	Hilton Coliseum (9,686); Ames, IA
March 1, 2026; 1:00 p.m., FS1		at Kansas State	W 93-79	22–8 (10–8)	41 – Crooks	14 – Brown	9 – J. Williams	Bramlage Coliseum (7,423); Manhattan, KS
Big 12 Conference tournament
March 5, 2026; 5:30 p.m., ESPN+	(7)	vs. (10) Arizona State; Second Round	L 68–77	22–9	21 – Crooks	12 – Brown	6 – J. Williams	T-Mobile Center; Kansas City, MO
NCAA tournament
March 21, 2026; 4:30 p.m., ESPN2	(8 FW1)	vs. (9 FW1) Syracuse; First Round	L 63–72	22–10	37 – Crooks	7 – Brown	8 – J. Williams	Harry A. Gampel Pavilion (10,244); Storrs, CT
*Non-conference game. ^{#}Rankings from AP poll. (#) Tournament seedings in parentheses. All times are in Central.

== Rankings ==
Ranking movements Legend: ██ Increase in ranking ██ Decrease in ranking — = Not ranked RV = Received votes
	Week																				
Poll	Pre	1	2	3	4	5	6	7	8	9	10	11	12	13	14	15	16	17	18	19	Final
AP	14	16	12	10	10	10	10	10	10*	11	19	RV	—	RV	RV	RV	RV	RV	—	—	
Coaches	17	18	15	12	11	10	10	10	10	13	19	24	RV	RV	25	RV	25	RV	RV	RV	

*AP did not release a week 8 poll.

== See also ==
- 2025–26 Iowa State Cyclones men's basketball team
