= 2026 Big 12 Conference women's basketball tournament =

- Classification: Division I
- Season: 2025–26
- Teams: 16
- Site: T-Mobile Center; Kansas City, Missouri
- Champions: West Virginia (2nd title)
- Winning coach: Mark Kellogg (1st title)
- MVP: Jordan Harrison (West Virginia)
- Attendance: 39,066
- Television: ESPN, ESPNU, ESPN+

2025–26 Big 12 women's basketball standings
	Conf.				Overall
Team	W		L	PCT	W		L	PCT
No. 6 TCU	15	–	3	.833	32	–	6	.842
No. 18 West Virginia †	14	–	4	.778	28	–	7	.800
No. 23 Baylor	13	–	5	.722	25	–	9	.735
Oklahoma State	12	–	6	.667	24	–	10	.706
Texas Tech	12	–	6	.667	26	–	8	.765
Colorado	11	–	7	.611	22	–	12	.647
Iowa State	10	–	8	.556	22	–	10	.688
Utah	10	–	8	.556	19	–	13	.594
BYU	9	–	9	.500	26	–	12	.684
Arizona State	9	–	9	.500	24	–	11	.686
Kansas	8	–	10	.444	22	–	14	.611
Kansas State	8	–	10	.444	19	–	18	.514
Cincinnati	6	–	12	.333	11	–	20	.355
UCF	3	–	15	.167	11	–	19	.367
Arizona	3	–	15	.167	12	–	18	.400
Houston	1	–	17	.056	7	–	23	.233
† 2026 Big 12 tournament winner Rankings from AP poll

The 2026 Big 12 Women's Basketball Tournament was a postseason women's basketball tournament for the Big 12 Conference, played from March 4–8, 2026, at T-Mobile Center in Kansas City, Missouri.

No. 2 West Virginia defeated defending champions No. 1 TCU 62–53 in the championship game, claiming their first Big 12 title since 2017, and earning the conference's automatic bid to the NCAA tournament. This was the first time in tournament history that a No. 2 seed took down a No. 1 seed in the title game.

The tournament was notably the first non-exhibition basketball competition in the United States to utilize a glass court; the court contained an LED display used to display the court design and markings, as well as animated graphics and video content.

== Seeds ==
Teams were seeded by record within the conference, with a tiebreaker system to seed teams with identical conference records. The top eight teams received a first round bye and the top four teams received a double bye, automatically advancing them into the quarterfinals.

Seed	School	Big 12 Record	Tiebreaker
1	TCU #‡	15–3	
2	West Virginia ‡	14–4	
3	Baylor ‡	13–5	
4	Oklahoma State ‡	12–6	1–0 vs Texas Tech
5	Texas Tech †	12–6	0–1 vs Oklahoma State
6	Colorado †	11–7	
7	Iowa State †	10–8	1–0 vs Utah
8	Utah †	10–8	0–1 vs Iowa State
9	BYU	9–9	2–0 vs Arizona State
10	Arizona State	9–9	0–2 vs BYU
11	Kansas	8–10	2–0 vs Kansas State
12	Kansas State	8–10	0–2 vs Kansas
13	Cincinnati	6–12	
14	UCF	3–15	1–0 vs Arizona
15	Arizona	3–15	0–1 vs UCF
16	Houston	1–17	
# – Big 12 regular season champions, and tournament No. 1 seed. ‡ – Received a double-bye in the conference tournament. † – Received a single-bye in the conference tournament. Overall records include all games played in the Big 12 Tournament.

== Schedule ==
Game	Time*	Matchup^{#}	Score	Television	Attendance
First round – Wednesday, March 4
1	11:00 a.m.	No. 12 Kansas State vs. No. 13 Cincinnati	91–66	ESPN+	4,328
2	1:30 p.m.	No. 9 BYU vs. No. 16 Houston	76−66	ESPN+	4,328
3	5:30 p.m.	No. 10 Arizona State vs. No. 15 Arizona	54−51	ESPN+	4,144
4	8:00 p.m.	No. 11 Kansas vs. No. 14 UCF	56−35	ESPN+	4,144
Second round – Thursday, March 5
5	11:00 a.m.	No. 5 Texas Tech vs. No. 12 Kansas State	51–58	ESPN+	4,603
6	1:30 p.m.	No. 8 Utah vs. No. 9 BYU	52–70	ESPN+	4,603
7	5:30 p.m.	No. 7 Iowa State vs. No. 10 Arizona State	68–77	ESPN+	4,646
8	8:00 p.m.	No. 6 Colorado vs. No. 11 Kansas	55–48	ESPN+	4,646
Quarterfinals – Friday, March 6
9	11:00 a.m.	No. 4 Oklahoma State vs. No. 12 Kansas State	73–74	ESPNU	3,812
10	1:30 p.m.	No. 1 TCU vs. No. 9 BYU	63−46	ESPNU	3,812
11	5:30 p.m.	No. 2 West Virginia vs. No. 10 Arizona State	67–54	ESPN+	4,771
12	8:00 p.m.	No. 3 Baylor vs. No. 6 Colorado	53–62	ESPN+	4,771
Semifinals – Saturday, March 7
13	3:00 p.m.	No. 1 TCU vs. No. 12 Kansas State	74–62	ESPN+	6,905
14	5:30 p.m.	No. 2 West Virginia vs. No. 6 Colorado	48–47	ESPN+	6,905
Championship – Sunday, March 8
15	4:00 p.m.	No. 1 TCU vs. No. 2 West Virginia	53–62	ESPN	5,857
*Game times in CDT. #-Rankings denote tournament seed

== Bracket ==
First round Wednesday, March 4
12	Kansas State	91
13	Cincinnati	66
16	Houston	66
9	BYU	76
10	Arizona State	54
15	Arizona	51
11	Kansas	56
14	UCF	35

Second round Thursday, March 5
5	21 Texas Tech	51
12	Kansas State	58
8	Utah	52
9	BYU	70
7	Iowa State	68
10	Arizona State	77
6	Colorado	55
11	Kansas	48

Quarterfinals; Friday, March 6
4	Oklahoma State	73
12	Kansas State	74
1	10 TCU	63
9	BYU	46
2	15 West Virginia	67
10	Arizona State	54
3	20 Baylor	53
6	Colorado	62

Semifinals; Saturday, March 7
1	10 TCU	74
12	Kansas State	62
2	15 West Virginia	48
6	Colorado	47

Championship; Sunday, March 8
1	10 TCU	53
2	15 West Virginia	62
