= 2025–26 Arizona Wildcats women's basketball team =

American college basketball season

2025–26 Arizona Wildcats women's basketball
- Conference: Big 12 Conference
- Record: 12–18 (3–15 Big 12)
- Head coach: Becky Burke (1st season)
- Associate head coach: Ashley Odom (1st season)
- Assistant coaches: Julie Hairgrove (1st season); James Ewing (1st season); Jenna Knudson (1st season)
- Home arena: McKale Center

2025–26 Big 12 women's basketball standings
	Conf.				Overall
Team	W		L	PCT	W		L	PCT
No. 6 TCU	15	–	3	.833	32	–	6	.842
No. 18 West Virginia †	14	–	4	.778	28	–	7	.800
No. 23 Baylor	13	–	5	.722	25	–	9	.735
Oklahoma State	12	–	6	.667	24	–	10	.706
Texas Tech	12	–	6	.667	26	–	8	.765
Colorado	11	–	7	.611	22	–	12	.647
Iowa State	10	–	8	.556	22	–	10	.688
Utah	10	–	8	.556	19	–	13	.594
BYU	9	–	9	.500	26	–	12	.684
Arizona State	9	–	9	.500	24	–	11	.686
Kansas	8	–	10	.444	22	–	14	.611
Kansas State	8	–	10	.444	19	–	18	.514
Cincinnati	6	–	12	.333	11	–	20	.355
UCF	3	–	15	.167	11	–	19	.367
Arizona	3	–	15	.167	12	–	18	.400
Houston	1	–	17	.056	7	–	23	.233
† 2026 Big 12 tournament winner Rankings from AP poll

The 2025–26 Arizona Wildcats women's basketball team represents the University of Arizona during the 2025–26 NCAA Division I women's basketball season. The Wildcats are led by first-year head coach Becky Burke. This is the Wildcats' 52nd season at the on-campus McKale Center in Tucson, Arizona and 2nd season as a member of the Big 12 Conference.

== Previous season ==
The Wildcats finished the 2022–23 season with a record of 19–14, 10–8 in Big 12 play. They lost in the first round of the Big 12 tournament to Colorado. The Wildcats received an at-large bid to the WBIT as a No. 2 seed in the James Madison bracket, where they were upset by Northern Arizona in the first round.

== Offseason ==
Barnes left Arizona on April 5, 2025, after nine seasons with SMU. Buffalo head coach Burke was hired by the Wildcats on April 9.

=== Departures ===
Arizona Wildcats departures
Name	Number	Pos.	Height	Year	Hometown	Reason for departure
Lauryn Swann	1	G	5'7"	Freshman	Queens, NY	Transferred to Rutgers
Jada Williams	2	G	5'8"	Sophomore	Kansas City, MO	Transferred to Iowa State
Skylar Jones	4	G	6'0"	Sophomore	Chicago, IL	Transferred to Louisville
Ajae Yoakum	5	F	6'0"	Graduate student	Portland, OR	Transferred to Portland State
Erin Tack	10	F	6'1"	Junior	Kelso, WA	Transferred back to Arizona track and field
Sahnya Jah	11	F	6'0"	Sophomore	Alexandria, VA	Transferred to SMU
Mailien Rolf	13	G	5'10"	Freshman	Roßdorf, Germany	Transferred to SMU
Brooklyn Rhodes	14	F	6'0"	Sophomore	St. Louis, MO	Transferred
Paulina Paris	23	G	5'9"	Junior	Congers, NY	Transferred
Jorynn Ross	24	F	6'3"	Sophomore	Milwaukee, WI	Transferred to Houston
Breya Cunningham	25	F	6'4"	Sophomore	Chula Vista, CA	Transferred to Texas
Isis Beh	33	F	6'3"	(redshirt) Senior	Murray, UT	Transferred
Katarina Kneževic	34	F	6'0"	Freshman	Belgrade, Serbia	Transferred to SMU

=== Acquisitions ===
==== Incoming transfers ====
Arizona incoming transfers
Name	Number	Pos.	Height	Year	Hometown	Previous school
Mickayla Perdue	0	G	5'7"	Graduate student	Springfield, OH	Cleveland State
Kamryn Kitchen	1	G	5'9"	Sophomore	Charlotte, NC	Virginia
Sumayah Sugapong	3	G	5'7"	Junior	San Diego, CA	UC San Diego
Noelani Cornfield	4	G	5'6"	Graduate student	Gowanda, NY	Buffalo
Freddie Wallace	10	F	6'2"	Senior	Lincoln, NE	Kansas
Tanyuel Welch	11	G	5'10"	(redshirt) Junior	Indianapolis, IN	Memphis
Nora Francois	13	C	6'2"	Graduate student	Minneapolis, MN	New Orleans
Adde Adebanjo	14	F	6'3"	Sophomore	Lagos, Nigeria	Yamanashi Gakuin
Achol Magot	20	C	6'7"	Junior	Tucson, AZ	Texas Tech

==== 2025 recruiting class ====
There was no recruiting class of 2025.

==== 2026 recruiting class ====
College recruiting (2026)
Name	Hometown	School	Height	Weight	Commit date
Jasleen Green; G	Plantation, FL	American Heritage High School	5 ft 8 in (1.73 m)	N/A	
Jasleen Green; G	Recruit ratings: ESPN: (93)				
Makayla Presser-Palmer; G	Springfield, PA	Northwestern High School	5 ft 11 in (1.80 m)	N/A	
Makayla Presser-Palmer; G	Recruit ratings: ESPN: (93)				
Overall recruit ranking:
Note: In many cases, Scout, Rivals, 247Sports, On3, and ESPN may conflict in their listings of height and weight.; In these cases, the average was taken. ESPN grades are on a 100-point scale.; Sources: "2026 Player Commits". ESPN. Archived from the original on October 3, 2025.; "2026 Team Ranking". Rivals.

== Preseason ==
=== Preseason rankings ===
Big 12 media poll (coaches)
Predicted finish	Team	Votes (1st place)
1	TCU	219 (10)
2	Iowa State	202 (2)
3	Baylor	200 (2)
4	Oklahoma State	186 (2)
5	West Virginia	161
6	Kansas	156
7	Kansas State	211 (7)
8	Utah	115
9	Colorado	114
10	BYU	85
11	Arizona State	84
12	Cincinnati	82
13	Texas Tech	63
14	Arizona	47
15	Houston	41
16	UCF	22

Big 12 media poll (media)
Predicted finish	Team	Votes (1st place)
1	TCU	219 (10)
2	Iowa State	202 (2)
3	Baylor	200 (2)
4	Oklahoma State	186 (2)
5	West Virginia	161
6	Kansas State	211 (7)
7	Kansas	156
8	Utah	115
9	Colorado	114
10	BYU	85
11	Arizona State	84
12	Cincinnati	82
13	Texas Tech	63
14	Arizona	47
15	UCF	41
16	Houston	22

== Roster ==
2025–26 Arizona Wildcats women's basketball team
Players
Coaches

Pos.	#	Name	Height	Year	Previous school	Hometown
G	0	Mickayla Perdue	5 ft 7 in (1.7 m)	GS	Springfield; Cleveland State	Springfield, OH
G	1	Kamryn Kitchen	5 ft 9 in (1.75 m)	So	Independence; Virginia	Charlotte, NC
G	3	Sumayah Sugapong	5 ft 7 in (1.7 m)	Jr	La Jolla Country Day; UC San Diego	San Diego, CA
G	4	Noelani Cornfield	5 ft 6 in (1.68 m)	RS Sr	Lake Shore; Buffalo	Gowanda, NY
G	5	Molly Ladwing	5 ft 9 in (1.75 m)	Fr	Skutt Catholic	Omaha, NE
G	8	Mireia Jurado	6 ft 0 in (1.83 m)	Fr	Segle XXI	Avinyó, Spain
F	10	Fredriecka Wallace	6 ft 2 in (1.88 m)	Sr	Lincoln Southwest; Kansas	Lincoln, NE
G	11	Tanyuel Welch	5 ft 10 in (1.78 m)	RS Jr	North Central; Memphis	Indianapolis, IN
F	12	Montaya Dew	6 ft 2 in (1.88 m)	RS Jr	Centennial	Las Vegas, NV
C	13	Nora Francois	6 ft 2 in (1.88 m)	GS	Minnetonka; New Orleans	Minneapolis, MN
F	14	Adde Adebanjo	6 ft 3 in (1.91 m)	So	Japan Aviation Academy; Yamanashi Gakuin	Lagos, Nigeria
C	20	Achol Magot	6 ft 7 in (2.01 m)	So	Southern Arizona Volunteers Prep; Texas Tech	Tucson, AZ
F	33	Daniah Trammell	6 ft 1 in (1.85 m)	Fr	Winton Woods	Cincinnati, OH

Head coach

- Becky Burke (Louisville)

Assistant coach(es)

- Ashley Odom (Lamar)
- Julie Hairgrove (Arizona)
- James Ewing (Mercyhurst)
- Jenna Knudson (Embry-Riddle)

Legend

- (C) Team captain
- (S) Suspended
- (I) Ineligible
- (W) Walk-on
- Injured
- Current redshirt

Roster

== Schedule and results ==
Date time, TV	Rank^{#}	Opponent^{#}	Result	Record	High points	High rebounds	High assists	Site (attendance) city, state
Exhibition
October 23, 2025*; 6:00 p.m., ESPN+		West Texas A&M	L 57–60		14 – Cornfield	8 – Welch	4 – Cornfield	McKale Center (5,163); Tucson, AZ
October 30, 2025*; 6:00 p.m., ESPN+		Cal State Los Angeles	W 59–43		13 – Cornfield	9 – Francois	3 – Tied	McKale Center (5,028); Tucson, AZ
Non-conference regular season
November 6, 2025*; 6:00 p.m., ESPN+		UC Riverside	W 62–59	1−0	17 – Perdue	6 – Sugapong	8 – Cornfield	McKale Center (5,216); Tucson, AZ
November 9, 2025*; 2:00 p.m., ESPN+		UC Irvine	W 75–61	2–0	31 – Perdue	9 – Francois	12 – Cornfield	McKale Center (5,268); Tucson, AZ
November 16, 2025*; 6:00 p.m., ESPN+		Grambling State	W 85–64	3–0	15 – Tied	8 – Tied	10 – Cornfield	McKale Center (5,465); Tucson, AZ
November 21, 2025*; 6:00 p.m., ESPN+		Northern Arizona	W 87–76	4–0	27 – Perdue	4 – Ladwig	5 – Sugapong	McKale Center (5,613); Tucson, AZ
November 25, 2025*; 6:00 p.m., ESPN+		Northern Colorado	W 84–58	5–0	22 – Trammell	10 – Sugapong	7 – Cornfield	McKale Center (5,251); Tucson, AZ
November 29, 2025*; 6:00 p.m., ESPN+		Cal State Bakersfield	W 78–63	6–0	22 – Cornfield	6 – Tied	9 – Cornfield	McKale Center (5,328); Tucson, AZ
December 3, 2025*; 6:00 p.m., ESPN+		Southern	L 57–63	6–1	17 – Perdue	11 – Francois	6 – Cornfield	McKale Center (5,245); Tucson, AZ
December 7, 2025*; 2:00 p.m., ESPN+		New Mexico	L 69–72	6–2	20 – Cornfield	7 – Welch	7 – Cornfield	McKale Center (6,014); Tucson, AZ
December 10, 2025*; 11:00 a.m., ESPN+		Eastern Kentucky	W 87–83	7–2	27 – Perdue	4 – Cornfield	8 – Cornfield	McKale Center (7,780); Tucson, AZ
December 15, 2025*; 6:00 p.m., ESPN+		Chicago State	W 89–70	8–2	34 – Perdue	10 – Welch	7 – Cornfield	McKale Center (5,219); Tucson, AZ
December 18, 2025*; 6:00 p.m., ESPN+		Bellarmine	W 105−59	9−2	18 – Welch	11 – Adebanjo	8 – Cornfield	McKale Center (5,124); Tucson, AZ
Big 12 regular season
December 22, 2025; 12:00 p.m., ESPN+		Utah	L 62−63	9−3 (0−1)	16 – Perdue	20 – Cornfield	4 – Cornfield	McKale Center (5,580); Tucson, AZ
December 31, 2025; 7:00 p.m., ESPN+		at Colorado	L 56–75	9–4 (0–2)	22 – Perdue	8 – Welch	3 – Cornfield	CU Events Center (2,045); Boulder, CO
January 3, 2026; 5:00 p.m., ESPN+		at No. 21 Texas Tech	L 49–80	9–5 (0–3)	19 – Welch	9 – Welch	3 – Cornfield	United Supermarkets Arena (6,053); Lubbock, TX
January 6, 2026; 6:00 p.m., ESPN+		BYU	W 75–72	10–5 (1–3)	21 – Francois	14 – Welch	10 – Cornfield	McKale Center (6,504); Tucson, AZ
January 10, 2026; 2:00 p.m., ESPN+		UCF	L 55–58	10–6 (1–4)	10 – Tied	10 – Francois	7 – Cornfield	McKale Center (5,426); Tucson, AZ
January 17, 2026; 3:00 p.m., ESPN+		at No. 10 TCU	L 62–78	10–7 (1–5)	17 – Sugapong	7 – Magot	5 – Cornfield	Schollmaier Arena (3,578); Fort Worth, TX
January 20, 2026; 6:00 p.m., ESPN+		Kansas	L 69–80	10–8 (1–6)	17 – Sugapong	7 – Cornfield	10 – Cornfield	McKale Center (5,503); Tucson, AZ
January 24, 2026; 2:00 p.m., FS1		at Iowa State	L 65–90	10–9 (1–7)	19 – Cornfield	8 – Francois	2 – Tied	Hilton Coliseum (10,165); Ames, IA
January 28, 2026; 6:30 p.m., ESPN+		at Arizona State	L 61–68	10–10 (1–8)	19 – Cornfield	6 – Jurado	6 – Cornfield	Desert Financial Arena (6,121); Tempe, AZ
February 1, 2026; 2:00 p.m., ESPN+		Oklahoma State	L 69–88	10–11 (1–9)	25 – Sugapong	4 – Tied	5 – Cornfield	McKale Center (7,802); Tucson, AZ
February 4, 2026; 6:00 p.m., ESPN+		Kansas State	W 72–62	11–11 (2–9)	21 – Cornfield	13 – Sugapong	4 – Tied	McKale Center (5,646); Tucson, AZ
February 7, 2026; 12:00 p.m., ESPN+		at No. 20 West Virginia	L 68–87	11–12 (2–10)	17 – Welch	6 – Tied	6 – Cornfield	Hope Coliseum (4,160); Morgantown, WV
February 10, 2026; 4:30 p.m., ESPN+		at Cincinnati	L 61–77	11–13 (2–11)	20 – Sugapong	7 – Welch	6 – Welch	Fifth Third Arena (1,748); Cincinnati, OH
February 14, 2026; 11:00 a.m., ESPN+		Arizona State	L 69–75	11–14 (2–12)	24 – Brackens	11 – Carrera	6 – LoVett	McKale Center (8,766); Tucson, AZ
February 17, 2026; 6:00 p.m., ESPN+		Colorado	L 70–78	11–15 (2–13)	25 – Cornfield	5 – Welch	8 – Cornfield	McKale Center (5,393); Tucson, AZ
February 21, 2026; 6:00 p.m., ESPN+		at No. 15 Baylor	L 60–74	11–16 (2–14)	11 – Tied	9 – Welch	4 – Francois	Foster Pavilion (3,840); Waco, TX
February 24, 2026; 6:00 p.m., ESPN+		Houston	W 75–67	12–16 (3–14)	20 – Sugapong	7 – Francois	9 – Cornfield	McKale Center (5,576); Tucson, AZ
February 28, 2026; 5:00 p.m., ESPN+		at Utah	L 67–81	12–17 (3–15)	31 – Sugapong	5 – Tied	9 – Cornfield	Jon M. Huntsman Center (2,760); Salt Lake City, UT
Big 12 Women's Tournament
March 4, 2026; 4:30 p.m., ESPN+	(15)	vs. (10) Arizona State; First Round	L 51–54	12–18	12 – Tied	7 – Francois	4 – Cornfield	T-Mobile Center (4,144); Kansas City, MO
*Non-conference game. ^{#}Rankings from AP Poll. (#) Tournament seedings in parentheses. All times are in Mountain Time.

== Rankings ==
Ranking movements Legend: — = Not ranked
	Week																			
Poll	Pre	1	2	3	4	5	6	7	8	9	10	11	12	13	14	15	16	17	18	Final
AP	—	—	—	—	—	—	—	—												Not released
Coaches	—	—	—	—	—	—	—	—												

== See also ==
- 2025–26 Arizona Wildcats men's basketball team
