= 2025–26 Utah Utes women's basketball team =

American college basketball season

2025–26 Utah Utes women's basketball

WBIT, First Round
- Conference: Big 12 Conference
- Record: 19–13 (10–8 Big 12)
- Head coach: Gavin Petersen (2nd season)
- Assistant coaches: Jordan Sullivan; Morgan Bailey; Ryan Larsen; Jace Henderson; Jenna Ross
- Home arena: Jon M. Huntsman Center

2025–26 Big 12 women's basketball standings
	Conf.				Overall
Team	W		L	PCT	W		L	PCT
No. 6 TCU	15	–	3	.833	32	–	6	.842
No. 18 West Virginia †	14	–	4	.778	28	–	7	.800
No. 23 Baylor	13	–	5	.722	25	–	9	.735
Oklahoma State	12	–	6	.667	24	–	10	.706
Texas Tech	12	–	6	.667	26	–	8	.765
Colorado	11	–	7	.611	22	–	12	.647
Iowa State	10	–	8	.556	22	–	10	.688
Utah	10	–	8	.556	19	–	13	.594
BYU	9	–	9	.500	26	–	12	.684
Arizona State	9	–	9	.500	24	–	11	.686
Kansas	8	–	10	.444	22	–	14	.611
Kansas State	8	–	10	.444	19	–	18	.514
Cincinnati	6	–	12	.333	11	–	20	.355
UCF	3	–	15	.167	11	–	19	.367
Arizona	3	–	15	.167	12	–	18	.400
Houston	1	–	17	.056	7	–	23	.233
† 2026 Big 12 tournament winner Rankings from AP poll

The 2025–26 Utah Utes women's basketball team represented the University of Utah during the 2025–26 NCAA Division I women's basketball season. The Utes, led by second-year head coach Gavin Petersen, played their home games at the Jon M. Huntsman Center and competed as second year members of the Big 12 Conference.

== Previous season ==
The Utes finished the 2024–25 season 22–9, 13–5 in Big 12 play to finish in a three-way tie for fourth place. As the No. 6 seed in the Big 12 tournament, they lost in the second round to Texas Tech. They received an at-large bid to the NCAA women's tournament as a No. 8 seed in the Birmingham Region 2, where they lost in the first round to Indiana.

== Offseason ==
=== Departures ===
Utah departures
Name	Num	Pos.	Height	Year	Hometown	Reason for departure
Inês Vieira	2	G	5'6"	Senior	Madeira Island	Graduated
Gianna Kneepkens	5	G	6'0"	(redshirt) Junior	Duluth, MN	Transferred to UCLA
Kylie Ray	6	G	5'8"	Freshman	La Crescenta, CA	Transferred to San Diego
Mayé Touré	21	F	6'3"	Graduate student	Athis-Mons, France	Graduated
Jenna Johnson	22	F	6'2"	Senior	Medina, MN	Graduated
Kennady McQueen	24	G	5'10"	Senior	Henefer, UT	Graduated
Néné Sow	25	C	6'8"	Senior	Brussels, Belgium	Transferred to Oregon State

=== Incoming ===
Utah incoming transfers
Name	Num	Pos.	Height	Year	Hometown	Previous school
Lani White	0	G	5'11"	Senior	Irvine, CA	Virginia Tech
Kamryn Mafua	14	G/F	6'1"	Sophomore	Folsom, CA	California

=== Recruiting class of 2025 ===
College recruiting
Name	Hometown	School	Height	Weight	Commit date
Leonna Sneed; PG	San Antonio, TX	Karen Wagner High School	5 ft 6 in (1.68 m)	N/A	
Leonna Sneed; PG	Recruit ratings: ESPN: (96)				
Avery Hjelmstad; G	Edmond, OK	Edmond Memorial High School	6 ft 0 in (1.83 m)	N/A	
Avery Hjelmstad; G	Recruit ratings: ESPN: (94)				
Overall recruit ranking:
Note: In many cases, Scout, Rivals, 247Sports, On3, and ESPN may conflict in their listings of height and weight.; In these cases, the average was taken. ESPN grades are on a 100-point scale.; Sources: "2025 Player Commits". ESPN. Archived from the original on November 1, 2025.

=== Recruiting class of 2026 ===
College recruiting (2026)
Name	Hometown	School	Height	Weight	Commit date
Peyton Jones; PG	Highlands Ranch, CO	Valor Christian High School	5 ft 11 in (1.80 m)	N/A	
Peyton Jones; PG	Recruit ratings: ESPN: (93)				
Overall recruit ranking:
Note: In many cases, Scout, Rivals, 247Sports, On3, and ESPN may conflict in their listings of height and weight.; In these cases, the average was taken. ESPN grades are on a 100-point scale.; Sources: "2026 Player Commits". ESPN. Archived from the original on November 1, 2025.

== Roster ==
2025–26 Utah Utes women's basketball team
Players
Coaches

Pos.	#	Name	Height	Year	Previous school	Hometown
G	0	Lani White	5 ft 11 in (1.8 m)	Sr	Mater Dei; Virginia Tech	Irvine, CA
G	1	Avery Hjelmstad	6 ft 1 in (1.85 m)	Fr	Edmond Memorial HS	Edmond, OK
G	2	LA Sneed	5 ft 6 in (1.68 m)	Fr	Karen Wagner HS	San Antonio, TX
G	3	Brooke Walker	5 ft 9 in (1.75 m)	So	Andover HS	Andover, KS
F	6	Evelina Otto	6 ft 2 in (1.88 m)	Fr	Denver East HS	Ventspils, Latvia
G	10	Grace Foster	5 ft 10 in (1.78 m)	So	Willetton	Perth, Australia
F	12	Chyra Evans	6 ft 3 in (1.91 m)	RS Jr	Lake Ginninderra; Michigan	Newcastle, Australia
G/F	14	Kamryn Mafua	6 ft 1 in (1.85 m)	So	Folsom HS; California	Folsom, CA
F	15	Alyssa Blanck	6 ft 2 in (1.88 m)	RS Jr	Olympus HS; BYU	Holladay, UT
F	20	Reese Ross	6 ft 1 in (1.85 m)	Jr	St. Thomas More HS	Rapid City, SD
G	22	Ella Todd	6 ft 0 in (1.83 m)	Fr	William Fremd HS	Palatine, IL
G	23	Maty Wilke	5 ft 10 in (1.78 m)	RS Sr	Beaver Dam HS; Wisconsin	Beaver Dam, WI
F	44	Samantha Crispe	6 ft 2 in (1.88 m)	Sr	Arapahoe HS; Boston University	Castle Pines, CO

Head coach

- Gavin Petersen (Hawaiʻi)

Assistant coach(es)

- Jordan Sullivan (Montana)
- Morgan Bailey (BYU)
- Ryan Larsen (MSU Moorhead)
- Jace Henderson (Montana)
- Jenna Ross

Legend

- (C) Team captain
- (S) Suspended
- (I) Ineligible
- (W) Walk-on
- Injured
- Current redshirt

Roster

== Schedule and results ==
Date time, TV	Rank^{#}	Opponent^{#}	Result	Record	High points	High rebounds	High assists	Site (attendance) city, state
Exhibition
October 27, 2025*; 7:00 p.m.		Western Colorado	W 90–56		–	–	–	Jon M. Huntsman Center; Salt Lake City, UT
Non-conference regular season
November 3, 2025*; 11:00 a.m., ESPN+		Sioux Falls	W 88–62	1–0	15 – Otto	9 – Otto	4 – Tied	Jon M. Huntsman Center (4,266); Salt Lake City, UT
November 7, 2025*; 6:00 p.m., MW Network		at Utah State	W 90–53	2–0	19 – White	7 – Evans	9 – Sneed	Smith Spectrum (1,146); Logan, UT
November 11, 2025*; 7:00 p.m., ESPN+		Utah Valley	W 75–52	3–0	16 – White	11 – Ross	4 – Tied	Jon M. Huntsman Center; Salt Lake City, UT
November 15, 2025*; 2:00 p.m., ESPN+		No. 25 Washington	L 61–72	3–1	13 – Wilke	12 – White	5 – Ross	Jon M. Huntsman Center (2,843); Salt Lake City, UT
November 21, 2025*; 3:00 p.m., FS2		vs. Syracuse; Basketball Hall of Fame Women's Showcase	L 49–61	3–2	18 – Wilke	7 – Ross	5 – Walker	Mohegan Sun Arena; Uncasville, CT
November 23, 2025*; 12:30 p.m., FS1		vs. No. 1 UConn; Basketball Hall of Fame Women's Showcase	L 41–93	3–3	9 – White	4 – Tied	4 – Evans	Mohegan Sun Arena; Uncasville, CT
November 26, 2025*; 7:00 p.m., ESPN+		Weber State	W 65–52	4–3	12 – Hjelmstad	7 – Tied	6 – Wilke	Jon M. Huntsman Center (2,030); Salt Lake City, UT
November 29, 2025*; 2:00 p.m., ESPN+		at Montana	W 78–38	5–3	16 – White	8 – Brooke	5 – Wilke	Dahlberg Arena (2,359); Missoula, MT
December 4, 2025*; 6:30 p.m., MW Network		at Colorado State	W 70–58	6–3	22 – Hjelmstad	7 – Wilke	6 – Sneed	Moby Arena (2,817); Fort Collins, CO
December 10, 2025*; 7:00 p.m., ESPN+		Boise State	W 91–58	7–3	23 – White	9 – White	6 – White	Jon M. Huntsman Center (2,182); Salt Lake City, UT
December 14, 2025*; 2:00 p.m., ESPN+		Northwestern	W 91–66	8–3	26 – White	8 – Ross	6 – Sneed	Jon M. Huntsman Center (2,217); Salt Lake City, UT
December 17, 2025*; 7:00 p.m., ESPN+		UC Riverside	W 61–52	9–3	17 – Ross	13 – Ross	3 – Tied	Jon M. Huntsman Center (2,126); Salt Lake City, UT
Big 12 regular season
December 22, 2025; 12:00 p.m., ESPN+		at Arizona	W 63–62	10–3 (1–0)	26 – White	14 – Ross	6 – Evans	McKale Center (5,580); Tucson, AZ
December 31, 2025; 2:00 p.m., ESPN+		Arizona State	L 68–69	10–4 (1–1)	17 – Wilke	13 – Ross	4 – Tied	Jon M. Huntsman Center (2,594); Salt Lake City, UT
January 3, 2026; 7:00 p.m., ESPN+		No. 8т TCU	W 87–77 ^{OT}	11–4 (2–1)	25 – White	8 – Otto	5 – Evans	Jon M. Huntsman Center (2,731); Salt Lake City, UT
January 7, 2026; 5:30 p.m., ESPN+		at Kansas	W 62–59	12–4 (3–1)	17 – White	9 – Ross	4 – Tied	Allen Fieldhouse (3,459); Lawrence, KS
January 10, 2026; 3:00 p.m., ESPN+		at Kansas State	W 80–73	13–4 (4–1)	21 – Ross	10 – Ross	5 – Evans	Bramlage Coliseum (3,820); Manhattan, KS
January 14, 2026; 7:00 p.m., ESPN+		No. 18 Baylor	L 45–61	13–5 (4–2)	14 – Tied	11 – Evans	3 – Tied	Jon M. Huntsman Center (2,862); Salt Lake City, UT
January 17, 2026; 12:00 p.m., ESPN+		at Houston	W 71–61	14–5 (5–2)	19 – White	8 – Hjelmstad	4 – Tied	Fertitta Center (1,204); Houston, TX
January 24, 2026; 5:00 p.m., ESPN+		No. 19 Texas Tech	L 49–77	14–6 (5–3)	13 – Ross	9 – Ross	4 – Sneed	Jon M. Huntsman Center (3,440); Salt Lake City, UT
January 27, 2026; 7:00 p.m., ESPN+		No. 22 West Virginia	W 71–64	15–6 (6–3)	15 – Sneed	10 – Ross	4 – Ross	Jon M. Huntsman Center (2,352); Salt Lake City, UT
January 31, 2026; 2:00 p.m., ESPN+		at BYU; Rivalry	L 65-77	15-7 (6-4)	20 – White	13 – Ross	2 – White	Marriott Center (4,622); Provo, UT
February 4, 2026; 5:00 p.m., ESPN+		at UCF	W 67-57	16-7 (7-4)	22 – White	9 – Ross	3 – Evans	Addition Financial Arena (1,053); Orlando, FL
February 7, 2026; 5:00 p.m., ESPN+		Iowa State	L 72-79	16-8 (7-5)	22 – Ross	12 – Ross	4 – Evans	Jon M. Huntsman Center (3,170); Salt Lake City, UT
February 11, 2026; 6:30 p.m., ESPN+		at Arizona State	L 61-71	16-9 (7-6)	19 – White	11 – Ross	3 – Tied	Desert Financial Arena (3,051); Tempe, AZ
February 14, 2026; 5:00 p.m., ESPN+		Cincinnati	W 67-59	17-9 (8-6)	23 – White	6 – Tied	6 – Sneed	Jon M. Huntsman Center (3,315); Salt Lake City, UT
February 16, 2026; 12:00 p.m., FOX		at Oklahoma State	L 55-73	17-10 (8-7)	10 – Tied	7 – Otto	4 – Ross	Gallagher-Iba Arena (2,746); Stillwater, OK
February 21, 2026; 2:00 p.m., ESPN+		BYU; Rivalry	L 74-86	17-11 (8-8)	20 – White	7 – Ross	4 – Ross	Jon M. Huntsman Center (4,085); Salt Lake City, UT
February 24, 2026; 7:00 p.m., ESPN+		at Colorado	W 67-64	18-11 (9-8)	21 – White	7 – Ross	4 – Evans	CU Events Center (2,675); Boulder, CO
February 28, 2026; 5:00 p.m., ESPN+		Arizona	W 81-67	19-11 (10-8)	19 – White	6 – Tied	5 – Sneed	Jon M. Huntsman Center (2,760); Salt Lake City, UT
Big 12 Women's Tournament
March 5, 2026; 12:30 pm, ESPN+	(8)	vs. (9) BYU; Second Round	L 52-70	19-12	20 – White	8 – Evans	5 – Sneed	T-Mobile Center (4,603); Kansas City, MO
*Non-conference game. ^{#}Rankings from AP Poll. (#) Tournament seedings in parentheses. All times are in Mountain Time.

== Rankings ==
Ranking movements Legend: ██ Increase in ranking ██ Decrease in ranking — = Not ranked RV = Received votes
	Week																				
Poll	Pre	1	2	3	4	5	6	7	8	9	10	11	12	13	14	15	16	17	18	19	Final
AP	—	—	—	—	—	—	—	—	—*	—	RV	RV									Not released
Coaches	—	—	—	—	—	—	—	—	—	—	—										

*AP did not release a week 8 poll.

== See also ==
- 2025–26 Utah Utes men's basketball team
