= List of current NCAA Division I women's basketball coaches =

As of the most recent college basketball season in 2025–26, 364 women's college basketball programs competed in NCAA Division I, including full D-I members, programs transitioning from a lower NCAA division (all from Division II), and Saint Francis (PA), transitioning to Division III. Six schools [East Texas A&M, Lindenwood, Queens (NC), St. Thomas (MN), Southern Indiana, and Stonehill] completed transitions from Division II or III at the end of the 2024–25 school year. At the same time, New Haven started its transition from Division II. Each program employs a head coach.

As of the recently completed 2025–26 college season, the longest-tenured head coach at his or her current school is Geno Auriemma of UConn, who has held that position since 1985–86.

Conference affiliations reflect those in place for the 2026–27 season.

Team	Conference	Current coach	First season
Abilene Christian Wildcats	United Athletic	Julie Goodenough	2012–13
Air Force Falcons	Mountain West	Stacy McIntyre	2024–25
Akron Zips	Mid-American	Ryan Gensler	2023–24
Alabama Crimson Tide	Southeastern	Pauline Love	2026–27
Alabama A&M Lady Bulldogs	Southwestern	Dawn Thornton	2024–25
Alabama State Lady Hornets	Southwestern	Johnetta Hayes	2025–26
Albany Great Danes	America East	Kelly Morrone	2026–27
Alcorn State Lady Braves	Southwestern	Nate Kilbert	2020–21
American Eagles	Patriot League	Kelly Killion	2025–26
Appalachian State Mountaineers	Sun Belt	Alaura Sharp	2024–25
Arizona Wildcats	Big 12	Becky Burke	2025–26
Arizona State Sun Devils	Big 12	Molly Miller	2025–26
Arkansas Razorbacks	Southeastern	Kelsi Musick	2025–26
Arkansas–Pine Bluff Golden Lions	Southwestern	Erica Leak	2024–25
Arkansas State Red Wolves	Sun Belt	Destinee Rogers	2022–23
Army Black Knights	Patriot League	Katie Kuester	2025–26
Auburn Tigers	Southeastern	Larry Vickers	2025–26
Austin Peay Governors	United Athletic	Brittany Young	2021–22
Ball State Cardinals	Mid-American	Brady Sallee	2012–13
Baylor Bears	Big 12	Nicki Collen	2021–22
Bellarmine Knights	Atlantic Sun	Monique Reid	2025–26
Belmont Bruins	Missouri Valley	Bart Brooks	2017–18
Bethune–Cookman Wildcats	Southwestern	Demetria Frank	2026–27
Binghamton Bearcats	America East	Mary Grimes	2024–25
Boise State Broncos	Pac-12	Gordy Presnell	2005–06
Boston College Eagles	Atlantic Coast	Kate Popovec-Goss	2026–27
Boston University Terriers	Patriot League	Melissa Graves	2021–22
Bowling Green Falcons	Mid-American	Fred Chmiel	2023–24
Bradley Braves	Missouri Valley	Chaia Meier	2026–27
Brown Bears	Ivy League	Monique LeBlanc	2020–21
Bryant Bulldogs	America East	Lynne-Ann Kokoski	2023–24
Bucknell Bison	Patriot League	Trevor Woodruff	2019–20
Buffalo Bulls	Mid-American	Kristen Sharkey	2025–26
Butler Bulldogs	Big East	Maria Marchesano	2026–27
BYU Cougars	Big 12	Lee Cummard	2025–26
Cal Poly Mustangs	Big West	Shanele Stires	2022–23
Cal State Bakersfield Roadrunners	Big West	Ray Alvarado	2026–27
Cal State Fullerton Titans	Big West	Sammy Doucette	2026–27
Cal State Northridge Matadors	Big West	Angie Ned	2024–25
California Golden Bears	Atlantic Coast	Charmin Smith	2019–20
California Baptist Lancers	Big West	Jarrod Olson	2012–13
Campbell Fighting Camels	Coastal	Ali Jaques	2026–27
Canisius Golden Griffins	Metro	Tiffany Swoffard	2024–25
Central Arkansas Sugar Bears	United Athletic	Tony Kemper	2023–24
Central Connecticut Blue Devils	Northeast	Kristin Caruso	2025–26
Central Michigan Chippewas	Mid-American	Kristin Haynie	2023–24
Charleston Cougars	Coastal	Amanda Butler	2026–27
Charleston Southern Buccaneers	Big South	Tim Hays	2026–27
Charlotte 49ers	American	Tomekia Reed	2024–25
Chattanooga Mocs	Southern	Deandra Schirmer	2024–25
Chicago State Cougars	Northeast	Corry Irvin	2024–25
Cincinnati Bearcats	Big 12	Katrina Merriweather	2023–24
Clemson Tigers	Atlantic Coast	Shawn Poppie	2024–25
Cleveland State Vikings	Horizon League	Bob Dunn	2026–27
Coastal Carolina Chanticleers	Sun Belt	Kevin Pederson	2022–23
Colgate Raiders	Patriot League	Shannon Bush	2025–26
Colorado Buffaloes	Big 12	JR Payne	2016–17
Colorado State Rams	Pac-12	Ryun Williams	2012–13
Columbia Lions	Ivy League	Megan Griffith	2016–17
Coppin State Eagles	Mid-Eastern	Darrell Mosley	2025–26
Cornell Big Red	Ivy League	Emily Garner	2024–25
Creighton Bluejays	Big East	Jim Flanery	2002–03
Dartmouth Big Green	Ivy League	Linda Cimino	2023–24
Davidson Wildcats	Atlantic 10	Gayle Fulks	2017–18
Dayton Flyers	Atlantic 10	Tamika Williams-Jeter	2022–23
Delaware Fightin' Blue Hens	Conference USA	Sarah Jenkins	2022–23
Delaware State Hornets	Mid-Eastern	Khadijah Rushdan	2026–27
Denver Pioneers	West Coast	Erik Johnson	2026–27 (Note: This is Johnson's second stint as Denver head coach. He had previously served from 2008 to 2012.)
DePaul Blue Demons	Big East	Jill Pizzotti	2024–25 (Note: Pizzotti was named acting head coach during Doug Bruno's medical leave during the entire 2024–25 season, and was officially named head coach following Bruno's retirement after that season.)
Detroit Mercy Titans	Horizon League	Kiefer Haffey	2025–26
Drake Bulldogs	Missouri Valley	Allison Pohlman	2021–22
Drexel Dragons	Coastal	Amy Mallon	2020–21
Duke Blue Devils	Atlantic Coast	Kara Lawson	2020–21
Duquesne Dukes	Atlantic 10	Dan Burt	2013–14
East Carolina Pirates	American	Kim McNeill	2019–20
East Tennessee State Buccaneers	Southern	Brenda Mock Brown	2022–23
East Texas A&M Lions	Southland	Valerie King	2023–24
Eastern Illinois Panthers	Ohio Valley	Marqus McGlothan	2024–25
Eastern Kentucky Colonels	United Athletic	Greg Todd	2021–22
Eastern Michigan Eagles	Mid-American	Sahar Nusseibeh	2024–25
Eastern Washington Eagles	Big Sky	Joddie Gleason	2021–22
Elon Phoenix	Coastal	Charlotte Smith	2011–12
Evansville Purple Aces	Missouri Valley	Ben Wierzba	2026–27
Fairfield Stags	Metro	Carly Thibault-DuDonis	2022–23
Fairleigh Dickinson Knights	Northeast	Stephanie Gaitley	2023–24
FIU Panthers	Conference USA	Jesyka Burks-Wiley	2020–21
Florida Gators	Southeastern	Tammi Reiss	2026–27
Florida A&M Lady Rattlers	Southwestern	Bridgette Gordon	2023–24
Florida Atlantic Owls	American	LeAnn Freeland	2025–26
Florida Gulf Coast Eagles	Atlantic Sun	Raina Harmon	2025–26
Florida State Seminoles	Atlantic Coast	Brooke Wyckoff	2022–23
Fordham Rams	Atlantic 10	Neil Harrow	2026–27
Fresno State Bulldogs	Pac-12	Ryan McCarthy	2025–26
Furman Paladins	Southern	Pierre Curtis	2023–24
Gardner–Webb Runnin' Bulldogs	Big South	Terri Williams	2025–26
George Mason Patriots	Atlantic 10	Vanessa Blair-Lewis	2021–22
George Washington Revolutionaries	Atlantic 10	Ganiyat Adeduntan	2025–26
Georgetown Hoyas	Big East	Darnell Haney	2023–24
Georgia Lady Bulldogs	Southeastern	Ayla Guzzardo	2026–27
Georgia Southern Eagles	Sun Belt	Heather Macy	2026–27
Georgia State Panthers	Sun Belt	Marcilina Grayer	2026–27
Georgia Tech Yellow Jackets	Atlantic Coast	Karen Blair	2025–26
Gonzaga Bulldogs	Pac-12	Lisa Fortier	2014–15
Grambling State Tigers	Southwestern	Courtney Simmons	2023–24
Grand Canyon Antelopes	Mountain West	Winston Gandy	2025–26
Green Bay Phoenix	Horizon League	Kayla Karius	2024–25
Hampton Lady Pirates	Coastal	Tamisha Augustin	2024–25
Harvard Crimson	Ivy League	Carrie Moore	2022–23
Hawaii Rainbow Wahine	Mountain West	Khalilah Mitchell	2026–27
High Point Panthers	Big South	Wyatt Foust	2026–27
Hofstra Pride	Coastal	Danielle Santos Atkinson	2019–20
Holy Cross Crusaders	Patriot League	Candice Green	2024–25
Houston Cougars	Big 12	Matthew Mitchell	2025–26
Houston Christian Huskies	Southland	Drew Long	2025–26
Howard Lady Bison	Mid-Eastern	Ty Grace	2015–16
Idaho Vandals	Big Sky	Arthur Moreira	2024–25
Idaho State Bengals	Big Sky	Seton Sobolewski	2008–09
Illinois Fighting Illini	Big Ten	Shauna Green	2022–23
Illinois State Redbirds	Missouri Valley	Kristen Gillespie	2017–18
Incarnate Word Cardinals	Southland	Jhasmin Player	2025–26
Indiana Hoosiers	Big Ten	Teri Moren	2014–15
Indiana State Sycamores	Missouri Valley	Marc Mitchell	2024–25
Iona Gaels	Metro	Angelika Szumilo	2023–24
Iowa Hawkeyes	Big Ten	Jan Jensen	2024–25
Iowa State Cyclones	Big 12	Bill Fennelly	1995–96
IU Indy Jaguars	Horizon League	Kate Bruce	2022–23
Jackson State Lady Tigers	Southwestern	Margaret Richards	2024–25
Jacksonville Dolphins	Atlantic Sun	Special Jennings	2023–24
Jacksonville State Gamecocks	Conference USA	Ricky Austin	2026–27
James Madison Dukes	Sun Belt	Sean O'Regan	2016–17
Kansas Jayhawks	Big 12	Brandon Schneider	2015–16
Kansas City Roos	Summit League	Candi Whitaker	2026–27 (Note: This is Whitaker's second stint as Kansas City head coach. She had previously served from 2006 to 2012.)
Kansas State Wildcats	Big 12	Jeff Mittie	2014–15
Kennesaw State Owls	Conference USA	Tianni Kelly	2026–27
Kent State Golden Flashes	Mid-American	Fran Recchia	2026–27
Kentucky Wildcats	Southeastern	Kenny Brooks	2024–25
La Salle Explorers	Atlantic 10	Mountain MacGillivray	2018–19
Lafayette Leopards	Patriot League	Ben O'Brien	2026–27
Lamar Lady Cardinals	Southland	A'Quonesia Franklin	2019–20
Lehigh Mountain Hawks	Patriot League	Addie Micir	2022–23
Le Moyne Dolphins	Northeast	Nick DiPillo	2024–25
Liberty Lady Flames	Conference USA	Alexis Sherard	2025–26
Lindenwood Lions	Ohio Valley	Phil Sayers	2026–27
Lipscomb Bisons	Atlantic Sun	Lauren Sumski	2019–20
Little Rock Trojans	United Athletic	Steve Wiedower	2024–25
LIU Sharks	Northeast	Baronton Terry	2026–27
Long Beach State	Big West	Minyon Moore	2026–27
Longwood Lancers	Big South	Erika Lang-Montgomery	2022–23
Louisiana Ragin' Cajuns	Sun Belt	Garry Brodhead	2012–13
Louisiana–Monroe Warhawks	Sun Belt	Scotty Fletcher	2025–26
Louisiana Tech Lady Techsters	Sun Belt	Brooke Stoehr	2016–17
Louisville Cardinals	Atlantic Coast	Jeff Walz	2007–08
Loyola Ramblers	Atlantic 10	Morgan Paige	2026–27
Loyola Greyhounds	Patriot League	Danielle O'Banion	2021–22
Loyola Marymount Lions	West Coast	Aarika Hughes	2021–22
LSU Tigers	Southeastern	Kim Mulkey	2021–22
LSU New Orleans Privateers	Southland	Trelanne Powell	2023–24
Maine Black Bears	America East	Amy Vachon	2017–18
Manhattan Jaspers	Metro	Heather Vulin	2016–17
Marist Red Foxes	Metro	Erin Doughty	2023–24
Marquette Golden Eagles	Big East	Cara Consuegra	2024–25
Marshall Thundering Herd	Sun Belt	Juli Fulks	2024–25
Maryland Terrapins	Big Ten	Brenda Frese	2002–03
Maryland Eastern Shore Hawks	Mid-Eastern	Malikah Willis	2024–25
McNeese Cowgirls	Southland	Ashton Feldhaus	2026–27
Memphis Tigers	American	Hana Haden	2026–27
Mercer Bears	Southern	Michelle Clark-Heard	2024–25
Mercyhurst Lakers	Northeast	Erin Mills-Reid	2025–26
Merrimack Warriors	Metro	Missy Traversi	2026–27
Miami Hurricanes	Atlantic Coast	Tricia Cullop	2024–25
Miami RedHawks	Mid-American	Glenn Box	2023–24
Michigan Wolverines	Big Ten	Kim Barnes Arico	2012–13
Michigan State Spartans	Big Ten	Robyn Fralick	2023–24
Middle Tennessee Blue Raiders	Conference USA	Matt Insell	2026–27
Milwaukee Panthers	Horizon League	Kyle Rechlicz	2012–13
Minnesota Golden Gophers	Big Ten	Dawn Plitzuweit	2023–24
Mississippi State Bulldogs	Southeastern	Sam Purcell	2022–23
Mississippi Valley State Devilettes	Southwestern	Jason James	2024–25
Missouri Tigers	Southeastern	Kellie Harper	2025–26
Missouri State Lady Bears	Conference USA	Beth Cunningham	2022–23
Monmouth Hawks	Coastal	Cait Wetmore	2024–25
Montana Lady Griz	Big Sky	Nate Harris	2024–25
Montana State Bobcats	Big Sky	Tricia Bader Binford	2005–06
Morehead State Eagles	Ohio Valley	Jackie Alexander	2026–27
Morgan State Lady Bears	Mid-Eastern	Nadine Domond	2025–26
Mount St. Mary's Mountaineers	Metro	Antoine White	2021–22
Murray State Racers	Missouri Valley	Rechelle Turner	2017–18
Navy Midshipmen	Patriot League	Tim Taylor	2020–21
NC State Wolfpack	Atlantic Coast	Wes Moore	2013–14
Nebraska Cornhuskers	Big Ten	Amy Williams	2016–17
Nevada Wolf Pack	Mountain West	Kelly Sopak	2026–27
New Hampshire Wildcats	America East	Megan Shoniker	2024–25
New Haven Chargers	Northeast	Debbie Buff	2018–19
New Mexico Lobos	Mountain West	Amy Eagan	2026–27
New Mexico State Aggies	Conference USA	Adeniyi Amadou	2026–27
Niagara Purple Eagles	Metro	Tiara Johnson	2026–27
Nicholls Colonels	Southland	Jalyn Johnson-Joubert	2026–27
NJIT Highlanders	America East	Mike Lane	2018–19
Norfolk State Spartans	Mid-Eastern	Jermaine Woods	2025–26
North Alabama Lions	United Athletic	Anna Nimz	2026–27
North Carolina Tar Heels	Atlantic Coast	Courtney Banghart	2019–20
North Carolina A&T Aggies	Coastal	Tarrell Robinson	2012–13
North Carolina Central Eagles	Mid-Eastern	Olivia Gaines	2026–27
North Dakota Fighting Hawks	Summit League	Dennis Hutter	2025–26
North Dakota State Bison	Summit League	Jory Collins	2019–20
North Florida Ospreys	Atlantic Sun	Erika Lambert	2023–24
North Texas Mean Green	American	Jason Burton	2023–24
Northeastern Huskies	Coastal	Priscilla Edwards	2023–24
Northern Arizona Lumberjacks	Big Sky	Laura Dinkins	2025–26
Northern Colorado Bears	Big Sky	Kristen Mattio	2021–22
Northern Illinois Huskies	Horizon League	Jacey Brooks	2025–26
Northern Iowa Panthers	Missouri Valley	Tanya Warren	2007–08
Northern Kentucky Norse	Horizon League	Jeff Hans	2024–25
Northwestern Wildcats	Big Ten	Carla Berube	2026–27
Northwestern State Demons	Southland	Alan Frey	2026–27
Notre Dame Fighting Irish	Atlantic Coast	Niele Ivey	2020–21
Oakland Golden Grizzlies	Horizon League	Keisha Newell	2025–26
Ohio Bobcats	Mid-American	Bob Boldon	2013–14
Ohio State Buckeyes	Big Ten	Kevin McGuff	2013–14
Oklahoma Sooners	Southeastern	Jennie Baranczyk	2021–22
Oklahoma State Cowgirls	Big 12	Jacie Hoyt	2022–23
Old Dominion Monarchs	Sun Belt	DeLisha Milton-Jones	2020–21
Ole Miss Rebels	Southeastern	Yolett McPhee-McCuin	2018–19
Omaha Mavericks	Summit League	Jamie Carey	2025–26
Oral Roberts Golden Eagles	Summit League	Cophie Anderson	2025–26
Oregon Ducks	Big Ten	Kelly Graves	2014–15
Oregon State Beavers	Pac-12	Scott Rueck	2010–11
Pacific Tigers	West Coast	Bradley Davis	2015–16
Penn Quakers	Ivy League	Mike McLaughlin	2009–10
Penn State Lady Lions	Big Ten	Tanisha Wright	2026–27
Pepperdine Waves	West Coast	Katie Faulkner	2024–25
Pittsburgh Panthers	Atlantic Coast	Robin Harmony	2026–27
Portland Pilots	West Coast	Michael Meek	2019–20
Portland State Vikings	Big Sky	Karlie Buriss	2025–26
Prairie View A&M Lady Panthers	Southwestern	Tai Dillard	2025–26
Presbyterian Blue Hose	Big South	Tiffany Sardin	2024–25
Princeton Tigers	Ivy League	Lauren Gosselin	2026–27
Providence Friars	Big East	Erin Batth	2023–24
Purdue Boilermakers	Big Ten	Katie Gearlds	2021–22
Purdue Fort Wayne Mastodons	Horizon League	Kate Peterson Abiad	2026–27
Queens Royals	Atlantic Sun	Jen Brown	2020–21
Quinnipiac Bobcats	Metro	Roman Owen	2026–27
Radford Highlanders	Big South	Mike McGuire	2013–14
Rhode Island Rams	Atlantic 10	Colleen Mullen	2026–27
Rice Owls	American	Lindsay Edmonds	2021–22
Richmond Spiders	Atlantic 10	Alisa Kresge	2026–27
Rider Broncs	Metro	Jackie Hartzell	2025–26
Robert Morris Colonials	Horizon League	Chandler McCabe	2024–25
Rutgers Scarlet Knights	Big Ten	Gary Redus II	2026–27
Sacramento State Hornets	Big West	Aaron Kallhoff	2023–24
Sacred Heart Pioneers	Metro	Jessica Mannetti	2013–14
St. Bonaventure Bonnies	Atlantic 10	Jim Crowley	2023–24 (Note: This is Crowley's second stint as St. Bonaventure head coach. He had previously served from 2000 to 2016.)
St. John's Red Storm	Big East	Joe Tartamella	2012–13
Saint Joseph's Hawks	Atlantic 10	Cindy Griffin	2001–02
Saint Louis Billikens	Atlantic 10	Rebecca Tillett	2022–23
Saint Mary's Gaels	West Coast	Jeff Cammon	2023–24
Saint Peter's Peacocks	Metro	Jennifer Leedham	2022–23
St. Thomas Tommies	Summit League	Mandy Pearson	2026–27
Sam Houston Bearkats	Conference USA	Ravon Justice	2018–19
Samford Bulldogs	Southern	Matt Wise	2025–26
San Diego Toreros	West Coast	Blanche Alverson	2025–26
San Diego State Aztecs	Pac-12	Stacie Terry-Hutson	2013–14
San Francisco Dons	West Coast	Molly Goodenbour	2016–17
San Jose State Spartans	Mountain West	Jonas Chatterton	2025–26
Santa Clara Broncos	West Coast	Loree Payne	2025–26
Seattle Redhawks	West Coast	John Bonner	2026–27
Seton Hall Pirates	Big East	Anthony Bozzella	2013–14
Siena Saints	Metro	Terry Primm	2024–25
SIU Edwardsville Cougars	Ohio Valley	Samantha Quigley Smith	2021–22
SMU Mustangs	Atlantic Coast	Adia Barnes	2025–26
South Alabama Jaguars	Sun Belt	Yolisha Jackson	2023–24
South Carolina Gamecocks	Southeastern	Dawn Staley	2008–09
South Carolina State Lady Bulldogs	Mid-Eastern	Cedric Baker	2025–26
South Dakota Coyotes	Summit League	Carrie Eighmey	2024–25
South Dakota State Jackrabbits	Summit League	Aaron Johnston	1999–2000
South Florida Bulls	American	Kristy Curry	2026–27
Southeast Missouri State Redhawks	Ohio Valley	Briley Palmer	2024–25
Southeastern Louisiana Lions	Southland	Jeff Dow	2025–26
Southern Lady Jaguars	Southwestern	Carlos Funchess	2018–19
Southern Illinois Salukis	Missouri Valley	Kelly Bond-White	2022–23
Southern Indiana Screaming Eagles	Ohio Valley	Rick Stein	1999–2000
Southern Miss Lady Eagles	Sun Belt	Missy Bilderback	2025–26
Southern Utah Thunderbirds	Big Sky	Tracy Sanders	2018–19
Stanford Cardinal	Atlantic Coast	Kate Paye	2024–25
Stephen F. Austin Ladyjacks	Southland	Leonard Bishop	2023–24
Stetson Hatters	Atlantic Sun	Melissa DeVore	2026–27
Stonehill Skyhawks	Northeast	Trisha Brown	2001–02
Stony Brook Seawolves	Coastal	Joy McCorvey	2024–25
Syracuse Orange	Atlantic Coast	Felisha Legette-Jack	2022–23
Tarleton State Texans	United Athletic	Bill Brock	2023–24
TCU Horned Frogs	Big 12	Mark Campbell	2023–24
Temple Owls	American	Diane Richardson	2022–23
Tennessee Lady Volunteers	Southeastern	Kim Caldwell	2024–25
Tennessee State Lady Tigers	Ohio Valley	Candice Dupree	2024–25
Tennessee Tech Golden Eagles	Southern	Kim Rosamond	2016–17
Texas Longhorns	Southeastern	Vic Schaefer	2020–21
Texas A&M Aggies	Southeastern	Joni Taylor	2022–23
Texas A&M–Corpus Christi Islanders	Southland	Toyelle Wilson	2025–26
Texas Southern Lady Tigers	Southwestern	Vernette Skeete	2022–23
Texas State Bobcats	Pac-12	Chris Kielsmeier	2026–27
Texas Tech Lady Raiders	Big 12	Krista Gerlich	2020–21
Toledo Rockets	Mid-American	Ginny Boggess	2024–25
Towson Tigers	Coastal	Laura Harper	2022–23
Troy Trojans	Sun Belt	Chanda Rigby	2012–13
Tulane Green Wave	American	Ashley Langford	2024–25
Tulsa Golden Hurricane	American	Angie Nelp	2021–22
UAB Blazers	American	Randy Norton	2013–14
UC Davis Aggies	Mountain West	Jennifer Gross	2011–12
UC Irvine Anteaters	Big West	Tamara Inoue	2016–17
UC Riverside Highlanders	Big West	Brad Langston	2023–24
UC San Diego Tritons	Big West (Note: UC San Diego and UC Santa Barbara join the West Coast Conference in 2027.)	Heidi VanDerveer	2012–13
UC Santa Barbara Gauchos	Big West	Renee Jimenez	2024–25
UCF Knights	Big 12	Gabe Lazo	2026–27
UCLA Bruins	Big Ten	Cori Close	2011–12
UConn Huskies	Big East	Geno Auriemma	1985–86
UIC Flames	Missouri Valley	Ashleen Bracey	2022–23
UMass Minutewomen	Mid-American	Mike Leflar	2023–24
UMass Lowell River Hawks	America East	Brianna Finch	2026–27
UMBC Retrievers	America East	Candice Hill	2024–25
UNC Asheville Bulldogs	Big South	Tynesha Lewis	2024–25
UNC Greensboro Spartans	Southern	Trina Patterson	2016–17
UNC Wilmington Seahawks	Coastal	Nicole Woods	2023–24
UNLV Lady Rebels	Mountain West	Lindy La Rocque	2020–21
USC Trojans	Big Ten	Lindsay Gottlieb	2021–22
USC Upstate Spartans	Big South	Jason Williams	2022–23
UT Arlington Mavericks	United Athletic	Shereka Wright	2020–21
UT Martin Skyhawks	Ohio Valley	Kevin McMillan	2009–10
UT Rio Grande Valley Vaqueros	Southland	Lane Lord	2018–19
Utah Utes	Big 12	Gavin Petersen	2024–25
Utah State Aggies	Pac-12	Wesley Brooks	2024–25
Utah Tech Trailblazers	Big Sky	Adam Wardenburg	2026–27
Utah Valley Wolverines	Big West	Dan Nielson	2019–20
UTEP Miners	Mountain West	Keitha Adams	2023–24 (Note: This is Adams' second stint as the Miners' head coach. She had previously been the head coach from 2001 to 2017.)
UTSA Roadrunners	American	Karen Aston	2021–22
Valparaiso Beacons	Missouri Valley	Courtney Boyd	2025–26
Vanderbilt Commodores	Southeastern	Shea Ralph	2021–22
VCU Rams	Atlantic 10	Chelsea Banbury	2026–27
Vermont Catamounts	America East	Maureen Magarity	2026–27
Villanova Wildcats	Big East	Denise Dillon	2020–21
Virginia Cavaliers	Atlantic Coast	Aaron Roussell	2026–27
Virginia Tech Hokies	Atlantic Coast	Megan Duffy	2024–25
Wagner Seahawks	Northeast	Terrell Coburn	2021–22
Wake Forest Demon Deacons	Atlantic Coast	Megan Gebbia	2022–23
Washington Huskies	Big Ten	Tina Langley	2021–22
Washington State Cougars	Pac-12	Kamie Ethridge	2018–19
Weber State Wildcats	Big Sky	Jenteal Jackson	2023–24
West Florida Argonauts	Atlantic Sun	Stephanie Lawrence Yelton	2012–13
West Georgia Wolves	United Athletic	Joanna Reitz	2022–23
West Virginia Mountaineers	Big 12	Mark Kellogg	2023–24
Western Carolina Catamounts	Southern	Jonathan Tsipis	2024–25
Western Illinois Leathernecks	Ohio Valley	J. D. Gravina	2011–12
Western Kentucky Lady Toppers	Conference USA	Greg Collins	2018–19
Western Michigan Broncos	Mid-American	Kate Achter	2025–26
Wichita State Shockers	American	Terry Nooner	2023–24
William & Mary Tribe	Coastal	Erin Dickerson Davis	2022–23
Winthrop Eagles	Big South	Semeka Randall Lay	2020–21
Wisconsin Badgers	Big Ten	Robin Pingeton	2025–26
Wofford Terriers	Southern	Jimmy Garrity	2016–17
Wright State Raiders	Horizon League	Kari Hoffman	2021–22
Wyoming Cowgirls	Mountain West	Heather Ezell	2022–23
Xavier Musketeers	Big East	Billi Chambers	2023–24
Yale Bulldogs	Ivy League	Dalila Eshe	2022–23
Youngstown State Penguins	Horizon League	Melissa Jackson	2024–25

== See also ==
- List of current NCAA Division I baseball coaches
- List of current NCAA Division I men's basketball coaches
- List of current NCAA Division I FBS football coaches
- List of current NCAA Division I FCS football coaches
- List of current NCAA Division I men's ice hockey coaches
- List of NCAA Division I men's soccer coaches
