= NCAA Division I women's basketball tournament all-time team records =

This is a list of NCAA Division I women's basketball tournament all-time records, updated through the 2025 tournament. Schools whose names are italicized are no longer in Division I, and can no longer be included in the tournament. Teams with (*) have had games vacated due to NCAA rules violations. The records do include vacated games.

| School | Conference | Games | Wins | Losses | Winning pct. |
|---|---|---|---|---|---|
| Abilene Christian | WAC | 1 | 0 | 1 | .000 |
| Akron | MAC | 1 | 0 | 1 | .000 |
| Alabama | SEC | 33 | 19 | 14 | .576 |
| Alabama State | SWAC | 3 | 0 | 3 | .000 |
| Albany | America East | 8 | 1 | 7 | .125 |
| Alcorn State | SWAC | 3 | 0 | 3 | .000 |
| American | Patriot | 3 | 0 | 3 | .000 |
| Appalachian State | Sun Belt | 4 | 0 | 4 | .000 |
| Arizona | Big 12 | 25 | 14 | 11 | .560 |
| Arizona State | Big 12 | 38 | 21 | 17 | .553 |
| Arkansas | SEC | 27 | 14 | 13 | .519 |
| Arkansas State | Sun Belt | 1 | 0 | 1 | .000 |
| Army | Patriot | 3 | 0 | 3 | .000 |
| Auburn | SEC | 52 | 30 | 22 | .577 |
| Austin Peay | ASUN | 7 | 0 | 7 | .000 |
| Ball State | MAC | 3 | 1 | 2 | .333 |
| Baylor | Big 12 | 78 | 58 | 20 | .744 |
| Belmont | MVC | 9 | 2 | 7 | .222 |
| Bethune–Cookman | SWAC | 1 | 0 | 1 | .000 |
| Boise State | MWC | 6 | 0 | 6 | .000 |
| Boston College | ACC | 16 | 9 | 7 | .563 |
| Boston University | Patriot | 1 | 0 | 1 | .000 |
| Bowling Green | MAC | 14 | 3 | 11 | .214 |
| Bradley | MVC | 1 | 0 | 1 | .000 |
| Brown | Ivy | 1 | 0 | 1 | .000 |
| Bucknell | Patriot | 4 | 0 | 4 | .000 |
| Buffalo | MAC | 7 | 3 | 4 | .429 |
| Butler | Big East | 1 | 0 | 1 | .000 |
| BYU | Big 12 | 22 | 7 | 15 | .318 |
| Cal Poly | Big West | 1 | 0 | 1 | .000 |
| Cal State Fullerton | Big West | 3 | 1 | 2 | .333 |
| Cal State Northridge | Big West | 4 | 0 | 4 | .000 |
| California | ACC | 28 | 13 | 15 | .464 |
| California Baptist | WAC | 1 | 0 | 1 | .000 |
| Campbell | CAA | 1 | 0 | 1 | .000 |
| Canisius | MAAC | 1 | 0 | 1 | .000 |
| Central Arkansas | ASUN | 2 | 0 | 2 | .000 |
| Central Michigan | MAC | 8 | 2 | 6 | .250 |
| Charlotte | American | 3 | 0 | 3 | .000 |
| Chattanooga | SoCon | 18 | 1 | 17 | .056 |
| Cheyney | Independent | 11 | 8 | 3 | .727 |
| Cincinnati | Big 12 | 5 | 1 | 4 | .200 |
| Clemson | ACC | 31 | 15 | 16 | .484 |
| Cleveland State | Horizon | 3 | 0 | 3 | .000 |
| Colgate | Patriot | 1 | 0 | 1 | .000 |
| Colorado | Big 12 | 37 | 21 | 16 | .568 |
| Colorado State | MWC | 11 | 5 | 6 | .455 |
| Columbia | Ivy | 3 | 1 | 2 | .333 |
| Coppin State | MEAC | 3 | 0 | 3 | .000 |
| Cornell | Ivy | 1 | 0 | 1 | .000 |
| Creighton | Big East | 20 | 9 | 11 | .450 |
| Dartmouth | Ivy | 7 | 0 | 7 | .000 |
| Dayton | A-10 | 14 | 5 | 9 | .357 |
| Delaware | C-USA | 8 | 3 | 5 | .375 |
| Delaware State | MEAC | 1 | 0 | 1 | .000 |
| Denver | Summit | 1 | 0 | 1 | .000 |
| DePaul | Big East | 42 | 17 | 25 | .405 |
| Detroit Mercy | Horizon | 1 | 0 | 1 | .000 |
| Drake | MVC | 21 | 6 | 15 | .286 |
| Drexel | CAA | 3 | 0 | 3 | .000 |
| Duke | ACC | 91 | 64 | 27 | .703 |
| Duquesne | A-10 | 2 | 1 | 1 | .500 |
| East Carolina | American | 3 | 0 | 3 | .000 |
| East Tennessee State | SoCon | 3 | 0 | 3 | .000 |
| Eastern Illinois | OVC | 1 | 0 | 1 | .000 |
| Eastern Kentucky | ASUN | 2 | 0 | 2 | .000 |
| Eastern Michigan | MAC | 2 | 0 | 2 | .000 |
| Eastern Washington | Big Sky | 2 | 0 | 2 | .000 |
| Elon | CAA | 2 | 0 | 2 | .000 |
| Evansville | MVC | 2 | 0 | 2 | .000 |
| Fairfield | MAAC | 7 | 0 | 7 | .000 |
| Fairleigh Dickinson | NEC | 1 | 0 | 1 | .000 |
| FIU | C-USA | 9 | 3 | 6 | .333 |
| Florida | SEC | 28 | 12 | 16 | .429 |
| Florida A&M | SWAC | 2 | 0 | 2 | .000 |
| Florida Atlantic | American | 1 | 0 | 1 | .000 |
| Florida Gulf Coast | ASUN | 15 | 4 | 11 | .267 |
| Florida State | ACC | 48 | 25 | 23 | .521 |
| Fordham | A-10 | 3 | 0 | 3 | .000 |
| Fresno State | MWC | 7 | 0 | 7 | .000 |
| Furman | SoCon | 2 | 0 | 2 | .000 |
| Gardner–Webb | Big South | 2 | 0 | 2 | .000 |
| George Mason | A-10 | 1 | 0 | 1 | .000 |
| George Washington | A-10 | 36 | 18 | 18 | .500 |
| Georgetown | Big East | 10 | 6 | 4 | .600 |
| Georgia | SEC | 97 | 59 | 36 | .621 |
| Georgia Southern | Sun Belt | 2 | 0 | 2 | .000 |
| Georgia State | Sun Belt | 3 | 0 | 3 | .000 |
| Georgia Tech | ACC | 19 | 7 | 12 | .368 |
| Gonzaga | WCC | 29 | 14 | 15 | .483 |
| Grambling State | SWAC | 6 | 0 | 6 | .000 |
| Grand Canyon | MWC | 1 | 0 | 1 | .000 |
| Green Bay | Horizon | 26 | 6 | 20 | .231 |
| Hampton | CAA | 9 | 0 | 9 | .000 |
| Hartford | D-III | 8 | 2 | 6 | .250 |
| Harvard | Ivy | 7 | 1 | 6 | .143 |
| Hawaii | Big West | 9 | 1 | 8 | .111 |
| High Point | Big South | 2 | 0 | 2 | .000 |
| Holy Cross | Patriot | 16 | 2 | 14 | .125 |
| Houston | Big 12 | 6 | 1 | 5 | .167 |
| Howard | MEAC | 7 | 1 | 6 | .143 |
| Idaho | Big Sky | 4 | 0 | 4 | .000 |
| Idaho State | Big Sky | 4 | 0 | 4 | .000 |
| Illinois | Big Ten | 19 | 9 | 10 | .474 |
| Illinois State | MVC | 7 | 1 | 6 | .143 |
| Incarnate Word | Southland | 1 | 0 | 1 | .000 |
| Indiana | Big Ten | 23 | 12 | 11 | .522 |
| Iona | MAAC | 2 | 0 | 2 | .000 |
| Iowa | Big Ten | 69 | 38 | 31 | .551 |
| Iowa State | Big 12 | 46 | 23 | 23 | .500 |
| IU Indy | Horizon | 1 | 0 | 1 | .000 |
| Jackson State | SWAC | 7 | 0 | 7 | .000 |
| Jacksonville | ASUN | 1 | 0 | 1 | .000 |
| James Madison] | Sun Belt | 21 | 8 | 13 | .381 |
| Kansas | Big 12 | 29 | 15 | 14 | .517 |
| Kansas State | Big 12 | 36 | 17 | 19 | .472 |
| Kent State | MAC | 7 | 1 | 6 | .143 |
| Kentucky | SEC | 41 | 23 | 18 | .561 |
| La Salle | A-10 | 5 | 1 | 4 | .200 |
| Lamar | Southland | 5 | 3 | 2 | .600 |
| Lehigh | Patriot | 5 | 0 | 5 | .000 |
| Liberty | C-USA | 20 | 2 | 18 | .100 |
| Lipscomb | ASUN | 1 | 0 | 1 | .000 |
| Little Rock | OVC | 8 | 2 | 6 | .250 |
| LIU | NEC | 1 | 0 | 1 | .000 |
| Long Beach State | Big West | 30 | 18 | 12 | .600 |
| Longwood | Big South | 2 | 1 | 1 | .500 |
| Louisiana | Sun Belt | 1 | 0 | 1 | .000 |
| Louisiana Tech | C-USA | 90 | 65 | 25 | .722 |
| Louisiana-Monroe | Sun Belt | 7 | 4 | 3 | .571 |
| Louisville | ACC | 72 | 45 | 27 | .625 |
| Loyola (MD) | Patriot | 2 | 0 | 2 | .000 |
| Loyola Marymount | WCC | 1 | 0 | 1 | .000 |
| LSU | SEC | 85 | 56 | 29 | .659 |
| Maine | America East | 11 | 1 | 10 | .091 |
| Manhattan | MAAC | 4 | 0 | 4 | .000 |
| Marist | MAAC | 16 | 5 | 11 | .313 |
| Marquette | Big East | 19 | 6 | 13 | .316 |
| Marshall | Sun Belt | 2 | 0 | 2 | .000 |
| Maryland | Big Ten | 86 | 55 | 31 | .640 |
| Massachusetts | MAC | 3 | 0 | 3 | .000 |
| McNeese | Southland | 2 | 0 | 2 | .000 |
| Memphis* | American | 9 | 2 | 7 | .222 |
| Mercer | SoCon | 4 | 0 | 4 | .000 |
| Miami (FL) | ACC | 27 | 11 | 16 | .407 |
| Miami (OH) | MAC | 1 | 0 | 1 | .000 |
| Michigan | Big Ten | 25 | 12 | 13 | .480 |
| Michigan State | Big Ten | 40 | 20 | 20 | .500 |
| Middle Tennessee | C-USA | 27 | 6 | 21 | .222 |
| Milwaukee | Horizon | 2 | 0 | 2 | .000 |
| Minnesota | Big Ten | 22 | 12 | 10 | .545 |
| Mississippi State | SEC | 38 | 25 | 13 | .658 |
| Missouri | SEC | 20 | 7 | 13 | .350 |
| Missouri State | C-USA | 36 | 19 | 17 | .528 |
| Monmouth | CAA | 3 | 1 | 2 | .333 |
| Montana | Big Sky | 27 | 6 | 21 | .222 |
| Montana State | Big Sky | 4 | 0 | 4 | .000 |
| Mount St. Mary's | MAAC | 4 | 0 | 4 | .000 |
| Murray State | MVC | 2 | 0 | 2 | .000 |
| Navy | Patriot | 3 | 0 | 3 | .000 |
| NC State | ACC | 65 | 35 | 30 | .538 |
| Nebraska | Big Ten | 26 | 9 | 17 | .346 |
| New Mexico | MWC | 11 | 3 | 8 | .273 |
| New Mexico State | C-USA | 6 | 0 | 6 | .000 |
| New Orleans | Southland | 1 | 0 | 1 | .000 |
| Nicholls | Southland | 1 | 0 | 1 | .000 |
| Norfolk State | MEAC | 4 | 0 | 4 | .000 |
| North Carolina | ACC | 84 | 53 | 31 | .631 |
| North Carolina A&T | CAA | 5 | 0 | 5 | .000 |
| North Dakota | Summit | 1 | 0 | 1 | .000 |
| North Texas | American | 1 | 0 | 1 | .000 |
| Northeastern | CAA | 1 | 0 | 1 | .000 |
| Northern Arizona | Big Sky | 1 | 0 | 1 | .000 |
| Northern Colorado | Big Sky | 1 | 0 | 1 | .000 |
| Northern Illinois | MAC | 7 | 2 | 5 | .286 |
| Northern Iowa | MVC | 3 | 0 | 3 | .000 |
| Northwestern | Big Ten | 11 | 4 | 7 | .364 |
| Northwestern State | Southland | 4 | 0 | 4 | .000 |
| Notre Dame | ACC | 103 | 75 | 28 | .728 |
| Oakland | Horizon | 2 | 0 | 2 | .000 |
| Ohio | MAC | 3 | 0 | 3 | .000 |
| Ohio State* | Big Ten | 64 | 36 | 28 | .563 |
| Oklahoma | SEC | 63 | 38 | 25 | .603 |
| Oklahoma State | Big 12 | 30 | 12 | 18 | .400 |
| Old Dominion | Sun Belt | 58 | 34 | 24 | .586 |
| Ole Miss | SEC | 44 | 23 | 21 | .523 |
| Oral Roberts | Summit | 6 | 0 | 6 | .000 |
| Oregon | Big Ten | 36 | 18 | 18 | .500 |
| Oregon State | WCC | 33 | 19 | 14 | .576 |
| Penn | Ivy | 5 | 0 | 5 | .000 |
| Penn State | Big Ten | 57 | 32 | 25 | .561 |
| Pepperdine | WCC | 4 | 0 | 4 | .000 |
| Pittsburgh | ACC | 10 | 6 | 4 | .600 |
| Portland | WCC | 6 | 0 | 6 | .000 |
| Portland State | Big Sky | 2 | 0 | 2 | .000 |
| Prairie View A&M | SWAC | 6 | 0 | 6 | .000 |
| Presbyterian | Big South | 2 | 1 | 1 | .500 |
| Princeton | Ivy | 15 | 3 | 12 | .200 |
| Providence | Big East | 7 | 2 | 5 | .286 |
| Purdue | Big Ten | 73 | 47 | 26 | .644 |
| Quinnipiac | MAAC | 8 | 3 | 5 | .375 |
| Radford | Big South | 4 | 0 | 4 | .000 |
| Rhode Island | A-10 | 1 | 0 | 1 | .000 |
| Rice | American | 5 | 1 | 4 | .200 |
| Richmond | A-10 | 6 | 1 | 5 | .167 |
| Robert Morris | Horizon | 6 | 0 | 6 | .000 |
| Rutgers | Big Ten | 62 | 36 | 26 | .581 |
| Sacramento State | Big Sky | 1 | 0 | 1 | .000 |
| Sacred Heart | MAAC | 6 | 1 | 5 | .167 |
| Saint Francis (PA) | D-III | 12 | 0 | 12 | .000 |
| Saint Joseph's | A-10 | 20 | 7 | 13 | .350 |
| Saint Louis | A-10 | 1 | 0 | 1 | .000 |
| Saint Mary's | WCC | 3 | 1 | 2 | .333 |
| Saint Peter's | MAAC | 7 | 0 | 7 | .000 |
| Samford | SoCon | 2 | 0 | 2 | .000 |
| San Diego | WCC | 3 | 0 | 3 | .000 |
| San Diego State | MWC | 16 | 6 | 10 | .375 |
| San Francisco | WCC | 6 | 2 | 4 | .333 |
| Santa Clara | WCC | 7 | 1 | 6 | .143 |
| Savannah State | D-II | 1 | 0 | 1 | .000 |
| Seattle | WCC | 1 | 0 | 1 | .000 |
| Seton Hall | Big East | 6 | 3 | 3 | .500 |
| Siena | MAAC | 1 | 0 | 1 | .000 |
| SMU | ACC | 10 | 3 | 7 | .300 |
| South Alabama | Sun Belt | 1 | 0 | 1 | .000 |
| South Carolina | SEC | 73 | 55 | 18 | .753 |
| South Carolina State | MEAC | 2 | 1 | 1 | .500 |
| South Dakota | Summit | 6 | 2 | 4 | .333 |
| South Dakota State | Summit | 19 | 6 | 13 | .316 |
| South Florida | American | 15 | 5 | 10 | .333 |
| Southeast Missouri State | OVC | 1 | 0 | 1 | .000 |
| Southeastern Louisiana | Southland | 1 | 0 | 1 | .000 |
| Southern Illinois | MVC | 6 | 2 | 4 | .333 |
| Southern Miss | Sun Belt | 12 | 4 | 8 | .333 |
| Southern Utah | WAC | 1 | 0 | 1 | .000 |
| Southern* | SWAC | 8 | 1 | 7 | .125 |
| St. Bonaventure | A-10 | 5 | 3 | 2 | .600 |
| St. Francis Brooklyn | None | 1 | 0 | 1 | .000 |
| St. John's | Big East | 19 | 8 | 11 | .421 |
| Stanford | ACC | 136 | 102 | 34 | .750 |
| Stephen F. Austin | Southland | 31 | 10 | 21 | .323 |
| Stetson | ASUN | 3 | 0 | 3 | .000 |
| Stony Brook | CAA | 1 | 0 | 1 | .000 |
| Syracuse | ACC | 24 | 11 | 13 | .458 |
| TCU | Big 12 | 17 | 8 | 9 | .471 |
| Temple | American | 14 | 4 | 10 | .286 |
| Tennessee | SEC | 166 | 132 | 34 | .795 |
| Tennessee State | OVC | 3 | 0 | 3 | .000 |
| Tennessee Tech | OVC | 16 | 4 | 12 | .250 |
| Tennessee–Martin | OVC | 5 | 0 | 5 | .000 |
| Texas | SEC | 92 | 56 | 36 | .609 |
| Texas A&M | SEC | 46 | 29 | 17 | .630 |
| Texas A&M-Corpus Christi | Southland | 1 | 0 | 1 | .000 |
| Texas Southern | SWAC | 1 | 0 | 1 | .000 |
| Texas State | Sun Belt | 2 | 0 | 2 | .000 |
| Texas Tech | Big 12 | 49 | 30 | 19 | .612 |
| Toledo | MAC | 13 | 4 | 9 | .308 |
| Towson | CAA | 1 | 0 | 1 | .000 |
| Troy | Sun Belt | 4 | 0 | 4 | .000 |
| Tulane | American | 14 | 3 | 11 | .214 |
| Tulsa | American | 3 | 1 | 2 | .333 |
| UAB | American | 4 | 2 | 2 | .500 |
| UC Davis | Big West | 3 | 0 | 3 | .000 |
| UC Irvine | Big West | 2 | 0 | 2 | .000 |
| UC Riverside | Big West | 3 | 0 | 3 | .000 |
| UC San Diego | Big West | 1 | 0 | 1 | .000 |
| UC Santa Barbara | Big West | 21 | 7 | 14 | .333 |
| UCF | Big 12 | 8 | 1 | 7 | .125 |
| UCLA | Big Ten | 49 | 29 | 20 | .592 |
| UConn | Big East | 166 | 142 | 24 | .855 |
| UMBC | America East | 1 | 0 | 1 | .000 |
| UNC Asheville | Big South | 3 | 0 | 3 | .000 |
| UNC Greensboro | SoCon | 2 | 0 | 2 | .000 |
| UNLV | MWC | 14 | 3 | 11 | .214 |
| USC | Big Ten | 52 | 35 | 17 | .673 |
| UT Arlington | WAC | 3 | 0 | 3 | .000 |
| Utah | Big 12 | 34 | 13 | 21 | .382 |
| Utah Valley | WAC | 1 | 0 | 1 | .000 |
| UTEP | C-USA | 3 | 1 | 2 | .333 |
| UTSA | American | 2 | 0 | 2 | .000 |
| Valparaiso | MVC | 2 | 0 | 2 | .000 |
| Vanderbilt | SEC | 69 | 40 | 29 | .580 |
| VCU | A-10 | 2 | 0 | 2 | .000 |
| Vermont | America East | 9 | 1 | 8 | .111 |
| Villanova | Big East | 25 | 11 | 14 | .440 |
| Virginia | ACC | 59 | 34 | 25 | .576 |
| Virginia Tech | ACC | 27 | 14 | 13 | .519 |
| Wake Forest | ACC | 3 | 1 | 2 | .333 |
| Washington | Big Ten | 41 | 21 | 20 | .512 |
| Washington State | WCC | 4 | 0 | 4 | .000 |
| Weber State | Big Sky | 2 | 0 | 2 | .000 |
| West Virginia | Big 12 | 30 | 13 | 17 | .433 |
| Western Carolina | SoCon | 2 | 0 | 2 | .000 |
| Western Illinois | OVC | 2 | 0 | 2 | .000 |
| Western Kentucky | C-USA | 37 | 17 | 20 | .459 |
| Western Michigan | MAC | 2 | 0 | 2 | .000 |
| Wichita State | American | 3 | 0 | 3 | .000 |
| William & Mary | CAA | 2 | 1 | 1 | .500 |
| Winthrop | Big South | 2 | 1 | 1 | .500 |
| Wisconsin | Big Ten | 9 | 2 | 7 | .222 |
| Wright State | Horizon | 4 | 1 | 3 | .250 |
| Wyoming | MWC | 2 | 0 | 2 | .000 |
| Xavier | Big East | 18 | 8 | 10 | .444 |
| Youngstown State | Horizon | 4 | 1 | 3 | .250 |

== See also ==
- NCAA Division I women's basketball tournament records
