= SWAC women's basketball tournament =

Conference championship tournament in women's basketball

- Conference basketball championship
- Sport: Basketball
- Conference: SWAC
- Number of teams: 10
- Format: Single-elimination tournament
- Played: 1982–present
- Last contest: 2025
- Current champion: Southern Lady Jaguars (7)
- Most championships: Jackson State Lady Tigers (9)
- Official website: SWAC Basketball

The SWAC women's basketball tournament is the conference championship tournament in women's basketball for the Southwestern Athletic Conference. It is a single-elimination tournament involving 8 of the 12 league schools, and seeding is based on regular-season records with head-to-head match-up as a tie-breaker. The winner has received the conference's automatic bid to the NCAA women's basketball tournament since 1994.

The highest seeds face off against the corresponding lowest seeds, with the two remaining teams facing off in the Finals to determine the champion.

The tournament has been held since 1982.

== Regular season champions ==
Year	Regular Season Champion	Coach
1982	Jackson State	Sadie Magee
1983	Jackson State	Sadie Magee
1984	Alcorn State	Shirley Walker
1985	Alcorn State	Shirley Walker
1986	Alcorn State	Shirley Walker
1987	Grambling State	Patricia Bibbs
1988	Mississippi Valley State	Jessie Harris
1989	Grambling State	Patricia Bibbs
1990	Grambling State	Patricia Bibb1
1991	Alcorn State	Shirley Walker
1992	Alcorn State	Shirley Walker
1993	Alcorn State; Southern	Shirley Walker; Herman Hartman
1994	Alcorn State	Shirley Walker
1995	Alcorn State; Grambling State; Jackson State	Shirley Walker; Patricia Bibbs; Andrew Pennington
1996	Alcorn State; Jackson State	Shirley Walker; Andrew Pennington
1997	Grambling State	Patricia Bibbs
1998	Grambling State	David Ponton
1999	Grambling State	David Ponton
2000	Grambling State	David Ponton
2001	Alcorn State	Shirley Walker
2002	Southern	Sandy Pugh
2003	Alabama State; Jackson State	Freda Freeman-Jackson; Denise Taylor
2004	Alabama State	Freda Freeman-Jackson
2005	Alcorn State	Shirley Walker
2006	Jackson State; Southern	Denise Taylor; Sandy Pugh
2007	Prairie View A&M; Jackson State	Cynthia Cooper-Dyke; Denise Taylor
2008	Prairie View A&M	Cynthia Cooper-Dyke
2009	Prairie View A&M	Cynthia Cooper-Dyke
2010	Southern	Sandy Pugh
2011	Southern	Sandy Pugh
2012	Mississippi Valley State	Nate Kilbert
2013	Texas Southern	Cynthia Cooper-Dyke
2014	Southern	Sandy Pugh
2015	Alabama State	Freda Freeman-Jackson
2016	Alabama State	Freda Freeman-Jackson
2017	Grambling State; Texas Southern	Freddie Murray; Johnetta Hayes-Perry
2018	Southern	Sandy Pugh
2019	Southern	Carlos Funchess
2020	Jackson State	Tomekia Reed
2021	Jackson State	Tomekia Reed
2022	Jackson State	Tomekia Reed
2023	Jackson State	Tomekia Reed
2024	Jackson State	Tomekia Reed
2025	Southern	Carlos Funchess
2026	Alabama A&M	Dawn Thornton

== Tournament champions ==
Tournament Year	Champion	Coach
1982	Jackson State	Sadie Magee
1983	Jackson State	Sadie Magee
1984	Jackson State	Sadie Magee
1985	Jackson State	Sadie Magee
1986	Alcorn State	Shirley Walker
1987	Mississippi Valley State	Jessie Harris
1988	Grambling State	Patricia Bibbs
1989	Alabama State	Ron Mitchell
1990	Jackson State	Andrew Pennington
1991	Alcorn State	Shirley Walker
1992	Alcorn State	Shirley Walker
1993	Mississippi Valley State	Jessie Harris
1994	Grambling State	Patricia Bibbs
1995	Jackson State	Andrew Pennington
1996	Grambling State	Patricia Bibbs
1997	Grambling State	Patricia Bibbs
1998	Grambling State	David Ponton
1999	Grambling State	David Ponton
2000	Alcorn State	Shirley Walker
2001	Alcorn State	Shirley Walker
2002	Southern	Sandy Pugh
2003	Alabama State	Freda Freeman-Jackson
2004	Southern	Sandy Pugh
2005	Alcorn State	Shirley Walker
2006	Southern	Sandy Pugh
2007	Prairie View A&M	Cynthia Cooper-Dyke
2008	Jackson State	Denise Taylor
2009	Prairie View A&M	Cynthia Cooper-Dyke
2010	Southern	Sandy Pugh
2011	Prairie View A&M	Toyelle Wilson
2012	Prairie View A&M	Toyelle Wilson
2013	Prairie View A&M	Toyelle Wilson
2014	Prairie View A&M	Dawn Brown
2015	Alabama State	Freda Freeman-Jackson
2016	Alabama State	Freda Freeman-Jackson
2017	Texas Southern	Johnetta Hayes-Perry
2018	Grambling State	Freddie Murray
2019	Southern	Carlos Funchess
2020	Cancelled due to the COVID-19 pandemic.	
2021	Jackson State	Tomekia Reed
2022	Jackson State	Tomekia Reed
2023	Southern	Carlos Funchess
2024	Jackson State	Tomekia Reed
2025	Southern	Carlos Funchess
2026	Southern	Carlos Funchess

== List of championships by school ==
School	Tournament Championships	Regular Season Championships
Jackson State	9	10
Grambling State	7	9
Southern	8	7
Alcorn State	6	11
Prairie View A&M	6	3
Alabama State	4	4
Mississippi Valley State	2	2
Texas Southern	1	2
Alabama A&M	0	1
Arkansas–Pine Bluff	0	0
Bethune–Cookman	0	0
Florida A&M	0	0

== See also ==
- SWAC men's basketball tournament
- SIAC women's basketball tournament
