= 2022–23 Southern Lady Jaguars basketball team =

American college basketball season

2022–23 Southern Lady Jaguars basketball
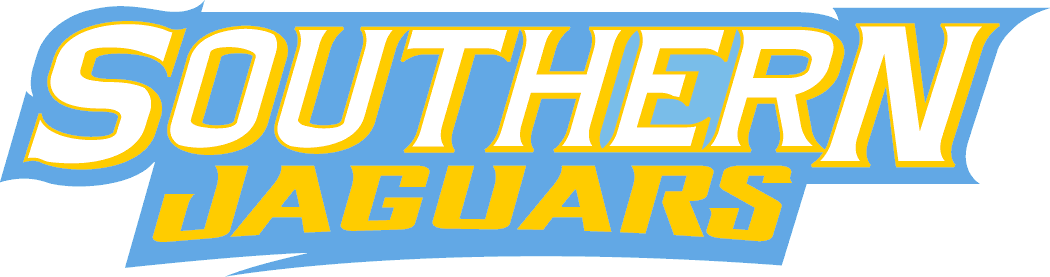

SWAC tournament champions

NCAA tournament, First Four
- Conference: Southwestern Athletic Conference
- Record: 18–15 (12–6 SWAC)
- Head coach: Carlos Funchess (5th season)
- Assistant coaches: Jeremy Bonin; Courtney Parson; Marjorie Cotton; T. J. Pugh
- Home arena: F. G. Clark Center

2022–23 SWAC women's basketball standings
	Conf.				Overall
Team	W		L	PCT	W		L	PCT
Jackson State	17	–	1	.944	21	–	9	.700
Alabama State	12	–	6	.667	16	–	15	.516
Alabama A&M	12	–	6	.667	14	–	15	.483
Prairie View A&M	12	–	6	.667	15	–	15	.500
Southern†	12	–	6	.667	18	–	14	.563
Arkansas–Pine Bluff	10	–	8	.556	14	–	17	.452
Bethune–Cookman	10	–	8	.556	11	–	18	.379
Grambling State	9	–	9	.500	10	–	20	.333
Alcorn State	8	–	10	.444	12	–	17	.414
Florida A&M	4	–	14	.222	6	–	23	.207
Texas Southern	2	–	16	.111	2	–	27	.069
Mississippi Valley State	0	–	18	.000	2	–	27	.069
† 2023 SWAC tournament winner As of March 11, 2023

The 2022–23 Southern Lady Jaguars basketball team represented Southern University during the 2022–23 NCAA Division I women's basketball season. The Lady Jaguars, led by fifth-year head coach Carlos Funchess, played their home games at the F. G. Clark Center in Baton Rouge, Louisiana as members of the Southwestern Athletic Conference (SWAC).

The Lady Jaguars finished the season 18–15, 12–6 in SWAC play, to finish in a four-way tie for second place. They defeated Prairie View A&M, Jackson State and Arkansas–Pine Bluff to win the SWAC tournament championship and earned the conference's automatic bid into the NCAA tournament, and their first tournament appearance since 2019. They received the #16 seed in the Seattle Regional 4, where they lost to Sacred Heart in the First Four.

== Previous season ==
The Lady Jaguars finished the 2021–22 season 14–17, 11–7 in SWAC play, to finish in a tie for fourth place. As a fourth seed in the SWAC women's tournament they defeated Texas Southern in the quarterfinals before losing to Jackson State in the semifinals.

== Roster ==
2022–23 Southern Lady Jaguars women's basketball team
Players
Coaches

Pos.	#	Name	Height	Year	Previous school	Hometown
G	0	Diamond Hunter	5 ft 8 in (1.73 m)	Jr	Lee HS; Sam Houston	Baton Rouge, LA
G	1	McKayla Marshall	5 ft 3 in (1.6 m)	Sr	Madison Preparatory Academy; Rend Lake College	Baton Rouge, LA
G	2	Aleighyah Fontenot	5 ft 9 in (1.75 m)	So	Ridge Point HS	Fresno, TX
G	3	Taylor Williams	5 ft 8 in (1.73 m)	Sr	Immaculate Conception HS; Daytona State College	Rahway, NJ
G	4	Chloe Fleming	5 ft 6 in (1.68 m)	Sr	South Terrebonne HS	Bourg, LA
G	5	Ra'von Robertson	5 ft 9 in (1.75 m)	Jr	Assumption HS	Plattenville, LA
G	12	Tyeniesha Metcalf	5 ft 6 in (1.68 m)	Sr	Southaven HS; East Mississippi CC	Southaven, MS
G	14	Soniyah Reed	6 ft 0 in (1.83 m)	So	Northshore HS	Slidell, LA
F	15	Sky Castro	6 ft 2 in (1.88 m)	Jr	Summit Academy Charter School; Saint Peter's	Queens, NY
G	20	Amani McWain	5 ft 8 in (1.73 m)	Sr	Ruston HS	Ruston, LA
C	21	Tionna Lidge	6 ft 4 in (1.93 m)	So	Andress HS	El Paso, TX
G	22	Sirviva Legions	5 ft 7 in (1.7 m)	Fr	Mansfield Legacy HS	Brooklyn, NY
G	23	Osha Cummings	5 ft 6 in (1.68 m)	Jr	Zachary HS; Northwestern State	Zachary, LA
G	24	Kyanna Morgan	5 ft 10 in (1.78 m)	Jr	Vance HS; Radford	Charlotte, NC
G	25	Genovea Johnson	5 ft 8 in (1.73 m)	Sr	Dillard HS	Fort Lauderdale, FL
C	32	Xyllize Harrison	6 ft 4 in (1.93 m)	So	Garland HS	Garland, TX
F	44	Raven White	6 ft 1 in (1.85 m)	Sr	Dillard HS	Fort Lauderdale, FL

Head coach

- Carlos Funchess (Louisiana–Monroe)

Assistant coach(es)

- Jeremy Bonin
- Courtney Parson (Southern)
- Marjorie Cotton (Mississippi)
- T. J. Pugh

Legend

- (C) Team captain
- (S) Suspended
- (I) Ineligible
- (W) Walk-on
- Injured
- Current redshirt

Roster
Last update: March 20, 2024

== Schedule and results ==
Date time, TV	Rank^{#}	Opponent^{#}	Result	Record	Site (attendance) city, state
Non-conference regular season
November 7, 2023*; 8:30 p.m., BTN+		at No. 4 Iowa	L 34–87	0–1	Carver–Hawkeye Arena (7,417); Iowa City, IA
November 14, 2022*; 6:30 p.m., ESPN+		No. 21 Oregon; Pac-12/SWAC Legacy Series	L 46–83	0–2	F. G. Clark Center (2,752); Baton Rouge, LA
November 17, 2022*; 5:30 p.m., ESPN+		at Northwestern State	W 56–52	1–2	Prather Coliseum (408); Natchitoches, LA
November 21, 2022*; 6:00 p.m., JSN		LSU–Shreveport	W 77–36	2–2	F. G. Clark Center (1,375); Baton Rouge, LA
December 1, 2022*; 1:00 p.m.		at Oregon State	L 36–89	2–3	Gill Coliseum (9,604); Corvallis, OR
December 4, 2022*; 2:00 p.m., LHN		at No. 22 Texas	L 43–92	2–4	Moody Center (4,987); Austin, TX
December 9, 2022*; 5:30 p.m.		Spring Hill College (AL)	W 84–54	3–4	Bonne Santé Wellness Center (286); Baton Rouge, LA
December 11, 2022*; 2:00 p.m., ESPN+		at Tulane	L 52–67	3–5	Devlin Fieldhouse (1,055); New Orleans, LA
December 16, 2022*; 6:00 p.m., ESPN+		at Wichita State	L 42–72	3–6	Charles Koch Arena (1,125); Wichita, KS
December 18, 2022*; 2:00 p.m., ESPN+		at No. 24 Oklahoma	L 50–76	3–7	Lloyd Noble Center (3,222); Norman, OK
SWAC regular season
January 2, 2023; 5:30 p.m.		at Texas Southern	W 70–62	4–7 (1–0)	H&PE Arena (535); Houston, TX
January 4, 2023; 5:30 p.m.		at Prairie View A&M	L 52–55 ^{OT}	4–8 (1–1)	William J. Nicks Building (365); Prairie View, TX
January 7, 2023; 3:00 p.m.		Florida A&M	W 55–49	5–8 (2–1)	F. G. Clark Center (1,525); Baton Rouge, LA
January 9, 2023; 5:30 p.m., HBCUGO Sports		Bethune–Cookman	W 65–53	6–8 (3–1)	F. G. Clark Center (1,846); Baton Rouge, LA
January 14, 2023; 12:30 p.m., HBCUGO Sports		Grambling State	W 59–49	7–8 (4–1)	F. G. Clark Center (3,157); Baton Rouge, LA
January 21, 2023; 3:00 p.m.		at Arkansas–Pine Bluff	L 53–70	7–9 (4–2)	H.O. Clemmons Arena (946); Pine Bluff, AR
January 23, 2023; 5:30 p.m.		at Mississippi Valley State	W 74–43	8–9 (5–2)	Harrison HPER Complex (1,247); Itta Bena, MS
January 28, 2023; 3:00 p.m.		Alcorn State	W 65–62	9–9 (6–2)	F. G. Clark Center (2,756); Baton Rouge, LA
January 30, 2023; 5:30 p.m.		Jackson State	L 57–64	9–10 (6–3)	F. G. Clark Center (4,157); Baton Rouge, LA
February 4, 2023; 3:00 p.m.		at Alabama A&M	L 50–60	9–11 (6–4)	Elmore Gymnasium (4,157); Huntsville, AL
February 6, 2023; 5:30 p.m.		at Alabama State	L 43–48	9–12 (6–5)	Dunn–Oliver Acadome (1,262); Montgomery, AL
February 11, 2023; 3:00 p.m.		Prairie View A&M	W 69–52	10–12 (7–5)	F. G. Clark Center (2,821); Baton Rouge, LA
February 13, 2023; 5:30 p.m., HBCUGo Sports		Texas Southern	W 70–52	11–12 (8–5)	F. G. Clark Center (2,178); Baton Rouge, LA
February 18, 2023; 3:00 p.m.		at Grambling State	W 54–50	12–12 (9–5)	Fredrick C. Hobdy Assembly Center; Grambling, LA
February 25, 2023; 1:00 p.m., HBCUGo Sports		at Bethune–Cookman	W 58–40	13–12 (10–5)	Moore Gymnasium (834); Daytona Beach, FL
February 27, 2023; 4:30 p.m.		at Florida A&M	L 50–57	13–13 (10–6)	Al Lawson Center (1,083); Tallahassee, FL
March 2, 2023; 5:30 p.m.		Alabama State	W 75–63	14–13 (11–6)	F. G. Clark Center (2,689); Baton Rouge, LA
March 4, 2023; 3:00 p.m.		Alabama A&M	W 66–53	15–13 (12–6)	F. G. Clark Center (2,489); Baton Rouge, LA
SWAC women's tournament
March 9, 2023; 5:30 p.m., ESPN+	(4)	vs. (5) Prairie View A&M; Quarterfinals	W 64–37	16–14	Bartow Arena (507); Birmingham, AL
March 10, 2023; 5:30 p.m., ESPN+	(4)	vs. (1) Jackson State; Semifinals	W 65–64	17–14	Bartow Arena (874); Birmingham, AL
March 11, 2023; 1:00 p.m., ESPN+	(4)	vs. (7) Arkansas–Pine Bluff; Semifinals	W 62–53	18–14	Bartow Arena (1,257); Birmingham, AL
NCAA women's tournament
March 15, 2023*; 8:00 p.m., ESPNU	(16 S4)	vs. (16 S4) Sacred Heart; First Four	L 47–57	18–15	Maples Pavilion (314); Stanford, CA
*Non-conference game. ^{#}Rankings from AP poll. (#) Tournament seedings in parentheses. S4=Seattle 4. All times are in Eastern.

== See also ==
- 2022–23 Southern Jaguars basketball team
