= 2025–26 SMU Mustangs women's basketball team =

American college basketball season

2025–26 SMU Mustangs women's basketball
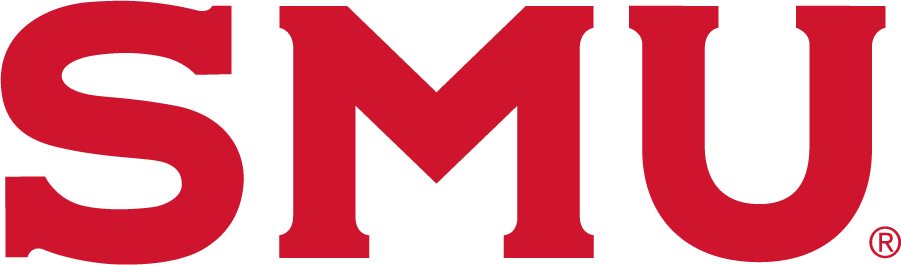
- Conference: Atlantic Coast Conference
- Record: 9–21 (2–16 ACC)
- Head coach: Adia Barnes (1st season)
- Assistant coaches: Salvo Coppa (1st season); Bett Shelby (1st season); Anthony Turner (1st season); Kamiko Williams (1st season)
- Home arena: Moody Coliseum

2025–26 ACC women's basketball standings
	Conf.				Overall
Team	W		L	PCT	W		L	PCT
No. 5 Duke †	16	–	2	.889	27	–	9	.750
No. 11 Louisville	15	–	3	.833	29	–	8	.784
No. 13 North Carolina	14	–	4	.778	28	–	8	.778
NC State	13	–	5	.722	21	–	11	.656
No. 9 Notre Dame	12	–	6	.667	25	–	10	.714
Virginia Tech	12	–	6	.667	23	–	10	.697
Syracuse	12	–	6	.667	24	–	9	.727
No. 19 Virginia	11	–	7	.611	22	–	12	.647
Clemson	11	–	7	.611	21	–	12	.636
California	9	–	9	.500	21	–	15	.583
Georgia Tech	8	–	10	.444	14	–	19	.424
Miami (FL)	8	–	10	.444	18	–	15	.545
Stanford	8	–	10	.444	21	–	14	.600
Florida State	5	–	13	.278	10	–	21	.323
Wake Forest	4	–	14	.222	14	–	18	.438
SMU	2	–	16	.111	9	–	21	.300
Pittsburgh	1	–	17	.056	8	–	23	.258
Boston College	1	–	17	.056	5	–	26	.161
† 2026 ACC tournament winner Rankings from AP Poll

The 2025–26 SMU Mustangs women's basketball team represented Southern Methodist University during the 2025–26 NCAA Division I women's basketball season. The Mustangs were led by first-year head coach Adia Barnes and played their home games at Moody Coliseum in University Park, Texas. (Note: University Park and its neighbor of Highland Park form an enclave within Dallas known as the Park Cities. All locations within the Park Cities have a Dallas mailing address.) They competed as second-year members of the Atlantic Coast Conference. Barnes began her first season as head coach after prior head coach Toyelle Wilson was fired after the previous season.

The Mustangs started the season with a 96–70 defeat of Grambling State. However, they would go on to lose their next four straight games before traveling to Nashville, Tennessee to participate in the Music City Classic. Their losing streak was extended to five games with a three-point loss to Saint Louis in the opening game. They broke their streak with a twenty-two point victory over Winthrop in the second game of the tournament. That victory kicked off a three-game winning streak for the Mustangs, which included an ACC–SEC Challenge victory over Arkansas. The streak was broken in their ACC opener where they lost to Syracuse. They would go on to win their final three non-conference games. They would then lose five straight games, included one ranked game, against thirteenth-ranked Louisville. The streak was broken in an 83–76 victory at Pittsburgh. The Mustangs would then go on a six-game losing streak, which included ranked losses to seventeenth-ranked Duke and twenty-first ranked North Carolina. The streak was again broken with a victory over Pittsburgh. They would lose their final four ACC games, with non being against ranked teams.

The Mustangs finished the season 9–21 and 2–16 in ACC play to finish in sixteenth place. They did not qualify for the 2025 ACC tournament. They were not invited to the NCAA tournament or the WBIT.

== Previous season ==
The Mustangs finished the season 10–20 and 2–16 in ACC play to finish in a tie for seventeenth place. Under the new ACC tournament rules, they did not qualify for the 2025 ACC tournament. They were not invited to the NCAA tournament or the WBIT.

== Offseason ==
=== Departures ===
Departures
Name	Num.	Pos.	Height	Year	Hometown	Reason for departure
Zanai Jones	1	G	5'5"	Graduate Student	Jersey City, New Jersey	Graduated
TK Pitts	2	G	6'1"	Junior	Lubbock, Texas	Transferred to Houston
Nya Robertson	3	G	5'7"	Junior	Fort Worth, Texas	Transferred to Tennessee
Kaysia Woods	4	G	6'0"	Senior	Lincoln, Nebraska	Graduated
Ella Brow	5	G	5'8"	Junior	Palm Beach, New South Wales	Transferred to Baylor
Kayanna Cox	12	G	5'10"	Freshman	Tenaha, Texas	Transferred to UCF
Sandra Magolico	13	F	6'2"	Senior	Maputo, Mozambique	Graduated
Nicole Rodriguez	17	G	5'8"	Graduate Student	Eastvale, California	Graduated
Kylie Marshall	22	G	5'11"	Sophomore	Mansfield, Texas	Transferred to James Madison
Donavia Hall	24	G	5'10"	Junior	Plano, Texas	—
Brianna McLeod	25	C	6'3"	Junior	Brampton, Canada	Transferred to James Madison
Chantae Embry	33	F	6'1"	Senior	Norman, Oklahoma	Graduated
Jessica Peterson	35	C	6'2"	Senior	Rancho Cucamonga, California	Graduated

=== Incoming transfers ===
Incoming transfers
Name	Num.	Pos.	Height	Year	Hometown	Previous School
Ayanna Thompson	1	G	6'1"	Senior	DeSoto, Texas	Ole Miss
Zahra King	2	G	5'10"	Sophomore	Brooklyn, New York	California
Tyi Skinner	3	G	5'5"	Graduate Student	Washington, D.C.	Arizona State
Anaya Brown	4	F	6'1"	Senior	Lexington, Kentucky	UT Martin
Grace Hall	7	F	6'2"	(redshirt) Senior	Homewood, Illinois	Penn State
Sahnya Jah	11	F	6'0"	Junior	Alexandria, Virginia	Arizona
Kyla Deck	12	G	5'9"	Senior	Frisco, Texas	North Texas
Mailien Rolf	13	G	5'10"	Sophomore	Roßdorf, Germany	Arizona
Elise Hill	20	G	5'7"	Junior	Tulsa, Oklahoma	Tulsa
Jzaniya Harriel	21	G	5'10"	(redshirt) Senior	Sacramento, California	Stanford
Paulina Paris	23	G	5'9"	Senior	Congers, New York	Arizona
Miriam Ibezim	33	F	6'2"	Senior	Rochester, New York	Oakland

=== Recruiting ===
College recruiting
Name	Hometown	School	Height	Weight	Commit date
Elizaveta Filchagina; G	Moscow, Russia	Spartak Saint Petersburg	6 ft 2 in (1.88 m)	N/A	Jun 17, 2025
Elizaveta Filchagina; G	Recruit ratings: ESPN: (NR)				
Jazzy Gipson; F	Albuquerque, New Mexico	Duncanville	6 ft 0 in (1.83 m)	N/A	Apr 7, 2025
Jazzy Gipson; F	Recruit ratings: ESPN: (NR)				
Roxy White; F	Frankfort, Illinois	Example Academy	5 ft 11 in (1.80 m)	N/A	Apr 7, 2025
Roxy White; F	Recruit ratings: ESPN: (NR)				
Overall recruit ranking:
Note: In many cases, Scout, Rivals, 247Sports, On3, and ESPN may conflict in their listings of height and weight.; In these cases, the average was taken. ESPN grades are on a 100-point scale.; Sources:

== Roster ==
2025–26 SMU Mustangs women's basketball team
Players
Coaches

Pos.	#	Name	Height	Year	Previous school	Hometown
G	1	Ayanna Thompson	6 ft 1 in (1.85 m)	Sr	DeSoto; Ole Miss	DeSoto, TX
G	2	Zahra King	5 ft 10 in (1.78 m)	So	Westtown; California	Brooklyn, NY
G	3	Tyi Skinner	5 ft 5 in (1.65 m)	GS	TPLS Christian Academy; Arizona State	Washington, D.C.
F	4	Anaya Brown	6 ft 1 in (1.85 m)	Sr	Lafayette; UT Martin	Lexington, KY
F	6	Jazzy Gipson	6 ft 0 in (1.83 m)	Fr	Duncanville	Albuquerque, NM
F	7	Grace Hall	6 ft 2 in (1.88 m)	RS Sr	Penn State	Homewood, IL
F	11	Sahnya Jah	6 ft 0 in (1.83 m)	Jr	Montverde Academy; Arizona	Alexandria, VA
G	12	Kyla Deck	5 ft 9 in (1.75 m)	Sr	Lone Star; North Texas	Frisco, TX
G	13	Mailien Rolf	5 ft 10 in (1.78 m)	So	Bertolt-Brecht-Schule; Arizona	Roßdorf, Germany
G	20	Elise Hill	5 ft 7 in (1.7 m)	Jr	Holland Hall; Tulsa	Tulsa, OK
G	21	Jzaniya Harriel	5 ft 10 in (1.78 m)	RS Sr	Antelope; Stanford	Sacramento, CA
F	22	Elizaveta Filchagina	6 ft 2 in (1.88 m)	Fr	Spartak Saint Petersburg	Moscow, Russia
G	23	Paulina Paris	5 ft 9 in (1.75 m)	Sr	Saddle River Day School; Arizona	Congers, NY
F	33	Miriam Ibezim	6 ft 2 in (1.88 m)	Sr	Gates Chili; Oakland	Rochester, NY
F	42	Roxy White	5 ft 11 in (1.8 m)	Fr	Example Academy	Frankfort, IL

Head coach

- Adia Barnes (Arizona)

Assistant coach(es)

- Salvo Coppa (IULM University of Milan)
- Bett Shelby (UNC Greensboro)
- Anthony Turner (Colorado)
- Kamiko Williams (Tennessee)

Legend

- (C) Team captain
- (S) Suspended
- (I) Ineligible
- (W) Walk-on
- Injured
- Current redshirt

Roster
Last update: October 8, 2025

== Schedule and results ==
Date time, TV	Rank^{#}	Opponent^{#}	Result	Record	High points	High rebounds	High assists	Site (attendance) city, state
Exhibition
October 21, 2025*; 6:30 p.m.		West Texas A&M	W 81–69	—	–	–	–	Moody Coliseum; University Park, TX
October 27, 2025*; 6:30 p.m.		Cal State Los Angeles	W 84–49	—	–	–	–	Moody Coliseum; University Park, TX
Regular season
November 4, 2025*; 11:00 a.m., ACCNX		Grambling State	W 96–70	1–0	19 – Jah	7 – Tied	4 – Tied	Moody Coliseum (2,594); University Park, TX
November 8, 2025*; 4:00 p.m., ACCNX		Kansas State	L 44–46	1–1	9 – King	7 – Jah	3 – Deck	Moody Coliseum (1,233); University Park, TX
November 13, 2025*; 6:00 p.m., ESPN+		at Texas Tech	L 60–91	1–2	15 – Skinner	5 – Ibezim	2 – Tied	United Supermarkets Arena (3,425); Lubbock, TX
November 18, 2025*; 7:00 p.m., ESPN+		at Grand Canyon	L 60–76	1–3	19 – King	5 – Tied	3 – Deck	Global Credit Union Arena (812); Phoenix, AZ
November 22, 2025*; 6:00 p.m., ACCNX		North Texas	L 55–58	1–4	12 – Paris	14 – Ibezim	3 – Tied	Moody Coliseum (1,206); University Park, TX
November 25, 2025*; 1:15 p.m., BallerTV		vs. Saint Louis; Music City Classic	L 67–70	1–5	15 – Brown	7 – Brown	3 – Skiner	Trevecca Trojan Fieldhouse (240); Nashville, TN
November 26, 2025*; 3:30 p.m., BallerTV		vs. Winthrop; Music City Classic	W 84–61	2–5	27 – Skinner	5 – Hall	3 – Tied	Trevecca Trojan Fieldhouse (208); Nashville, TN
December 1, 2025*; 6:30 p.m., ACCNX		Southern Miss	W 83–70	3–5	23 – King	10 – Ibezim	5 – Skinner	Moody Coliseum (1,056); University Park, TX
December 4, 2025*; 6:00 p.m., ACCN		Arkansas; ACC–SEC Challenge	W 78–63	4–5	22 – Jah	10 – Ibezim	10 – Skinner	Moody Coliseum (1,378); University Park, TX
December 7, 2025; 2:00 p.m., ACCNX		Syracuse	L 69–78	4–6 (0–1)	22 – Jah	9 – Jah	2 – Tied	Moody Coliseum (1,211); University Park, TX
December 10, 2025*; 6:30 p.m., ACCNX		Coppin State	W 57–49	5–6	16 – Jah	8 – Ibezim	4 – Deck	Moody Coliseum (1,175); University Park, TX
December 19, 2025*; 5:00 p.m., ESPN+		at Sam Houston	W 73–69	6–6	18 – Paris	11 – Ibezim	4 – Thompson	Bernard Johnson Coliseum (394); Huntsville, TX
December 21, 2025*; 4:00 p.m., ACCNX		Southern	W 74–62	7–6	18 – Paris	6 – Tied	3 – Harriel	Moody Coliseum (1,579); University Park, TX
December 29, 2025; 6:00 p.m., ACCNX		at Virginia	L 52–76	7–7 (0–2)	17 – King	5 – Tied	2 – Tied	John Paul Jones Arena (4,222); Charlottesville, VA
January 1, 2026; 1:00 p.m., ACCNX		at No. 13 Louisville	L 58–91	7–8 (0–3)	20 – Paris	5 – Thompson	3 – Paris	KFC Yum! Center (7,191); Louisville, KY
January 4, 2026; 3:00 p.m., ACCNX		Georgia Tech	L 59–67	7–9 (0–4)	21 – King	6 – Ibezim	4 – Paris	Moody Coliseum (1,530); University Park, TX
January 11, 2026; 5:00 p.m., ACCN		at NC State	L 54–91	7–10 (0–5)	22 – King	10 – Brown	2 – Tied	Reynolds Coliseum (5,500); Raleigh, NC
January 15, 2026; 6:30 p.m., ACCNX		Virginia Tech	L 42–79	7–11 (0–6)	22 – Brown	9 – Brown	2 – Gipson	Moody Coliseum (1,191); University Park, TX
January 18, 2026; 12:00 p.m., ACCNX		at Pittsburgh	W 83–76	8–11 (1–6)	40 – King	7 – Hall	4 – Gipson	Petersen Events Center (746); Pittsburgh, PA
January 22, 2026; 6:30 p.m., ACCNX		Florida State	L 51–73	8–12 (1–7)	14 – Jah	9 – Brown	3 – King	Moody Coliseum (1,109); University Park, TX
January 25, 2026; 4:00 p.m., ACCNX		Miami (FL)	L 66–75	8–13 (1–8)	18 – King	9 – Brown	8 – King	Moody Coliseum (1,244); University Park, TX
January 29, 2026; 6:00 p.m., ACCNX		at Clemson	L 54–83	8–14 (1–9)	18 – Brown	9 – Brown	2 – Brown	Littlejohn Coliseum (927); Clemson, SC
February 5, 2026; 6:30 p.m., ACCNX		Wake Forest	L 65–70	8–15 (1–10)	17 – Thompson	11 – Brown	3 – Tied	Moody Coliseum (1,361); University Park, TX
February 8, 2026; 1:00 p.m., ACCNX		at No. 17 Duke	L 36–95	8–16 (1–11)	9 – Hall	7 – Tied	1 – Tied	Cameron Indoor Stadium (3,664); Durham, NC
February 12, 2026; 6:00 p.m., ACCN		at No. 21 North Carolina	L 42–94	8–17 (1–12)	15 – King	6 – Brown	1 – Tied	Carmichael Arena (2,450); Chapel Hill, NC
February 15, 2026; 11:00 a.m., ACCN		Pittsburgh	W 79–78	9–17 (2–12)	25 – King	9 – Jah	6 – Thompson	Moody Coliseum (1,331); University Park, TX
February 19, 2026; 6:30 p.m., ACCNX		Boston College	L 59–77	9–18 (2–13)	19 – Brown	7 – Hall	5 – Hall	Moody Coliseum (1,289); University Park, TX
February 22, 2026; 5:00 p.m., ACCN		Notre Dame	L 63–88	9–19 (2–14)	23 – King	7 – Brown	7 – Thompson	Moody Coliseum (3,209); University Park, TX
February 26, 2026; 9:00 p.m., ACCNX		at Stanford	L 57–87	9–20 (2–15)	18 – Thompson	6 – Jah	7 – Thompson	Maples Pavilion (2,796); Stanford, CA
March 1, 2026; 4:00 p.m., ACCNX		at California	L 34–78	9–21 (2–16)	11 – Ibezim	9 – Ibezim	2 – Thompson	Haas Pavilion (3,025); Berkeley, CA
*Non-conference game. ^{#}Rankings from AP Poll. (#) Tournament seedings in parentheses. All times are in Central.
