= Texas A&M–Corpus Christi Islanders basketball =

Texas A&M–Corpus Christi Islanders basketball may refer to either of the basketball teams that represent the Texas A&M University–Corpus Christi:

- Texas A&M–Corpus Christi Islanders men's basketball
- Texas A&M–Corpus Christi Islanders women's basketball
