= Freda Freeman-Jackson =

American collegiate basketball coach

Biographical details
- Born: 1962 (age 62–63)

Playing career
- 1980–1984: Alabama State

Coaching career (HC unless noted)
- 1991–1994: Loachapoka HS
- 1994–1998: Alabama State (assistant)
- 1998–2025: Alabama State

Head coaching record
- Overall: 373–421 (.470)
- Tournaments: 0–3 (NCAA)

Accomplishments and honors

Championships
- 3× SWAC tournament (2003, 2015, 2016)

Awards
- 2× SWAC Coach of the Year (2003, 2021) Southeast High School Coach of the Year (1993)

Freda Freeman-Jackson (born 1962) is an American collegiate basketball coach, who was the head women's basketball coach at her alma mater, Alabama State University, for 26 seasons from 1998 to 2025. She recorded her 300th career win as coach in January 2019.

Jackson is married to former Alabama State Hornets basketball coach Lewis Jackson and their daughter Bianca currently plays for Florida State.

== Coaching career ==
On March 25, 2025, Freeman-Jackson retired from Alabama State after 26 seasons as head coach of the women's basketball team.

== Head coaching record ==
Statistics overview
Season	Team	Overall	Conference	Standing	Postseason
Alabama State Lady Hornets (SWAC) (1998–2025)
1998–99	Alabama State	15–13	9–7		
1999–2000	Alabama State	15–13	12–6		
2000–01	Alabama State	19–10	12–6		
2001–02	Alabama State	23–7	–		
2002–03	Alabama State	20–11	15–3	1st	NCAA first round
2003–04	Alabama State	19–9	–		
2004–05	Alabama State	15–14	–		
2005–06	Alabama State	15–15	–		
2006–07	Alabama State	12–19	–		
2007–08	Alabama State	12–18	8–8		
2008–09	Alabama State	14–16	11–7		
2009–10	Alabama State	13–17	8–10		
2010–11	Alabama State	8–22	5–12		
2011–12	Alabama State	15–13	11–7		
2012–13	Alabama State	12–16	6–10		
2013–14	Alabama State	14–15	8–9		
2014–15	Alabama State	17–15	9–8	3rd	NCAA first round
2015–16	Alabama State	19–12	14–4	1st	NCAA first round
2016–17	Alabama State	14–16	12–6		
2017–18	Alabama State	8–22	6–12		
2018–19	Alabama State	11–19	10–9		
2019–20	Alabama State	9–21	6–12		
2020–21	Alabama State	16–4	14–3	2nd	
2021–22	Alabama State	15–15	12–6	3rd	
2022–23	Alabama State	16–15	12–6	T-2nd	
2023–24	Alabama State	3–26	3–15	T-11th	
Alabama State:		359–391 (.479)			
Total:		359–391 (.479)			
National champion Postseason invitational champion Conference regular season champion Conference regular season and conference tournament champion Division regular season champion Division regular season and conference tournament champion Conference tournament champion
