= Tomekia Reed =

American collegiate basketball coach (born 1985)

Current position
- Title: Head coach
- Team: Charlotte
- Conference: AAC
- Record: 25–39 (.391)

Biographical details
- Born: August 24, 1981 (age 44); Jackson, Mississippi, U.S.

Playing career
- 1999–2000: Southern Miss
- 2000–2001: Hinds CC
- 2001–2003: Georgia Southwestern

Coaching career (HC unless noted)
- 2006–2009: Jackson State (assistant)
- 2015–2017: Hinds CC
- 2018–2024: Jackson State
- 2024–present: Charlotte

Head coaching record
- Overall: 150–93 (.617)
- Tournaments: 0–3 (NCAA)

Accomplishments and honors

Championships
- 4x SWAC tournament (2020–2023)

Awards
- 4x SWAC Coach of the Year (2020, 2022–2024)

Tomekia Reed (born 1985) is an American basketball coach who is currently the head women's basketball coach at Charlotte. She was previously the head coach at Jackson State from 2018 to 2024.

== Coaching career ==
Reed began her coaching career at Jackson State, where she served as an assistant from 2006 to 2009. After stints at Southern Miss, Louisiana Tech, Louisiana-Lafayette, and New Orleans, she was named head coach at Hinds Community College in 2015.

On April 16, 2018, Reed was named the head women's basketball coach at Jackson State.

She inherited a program without an NCAA Tournament appearance since 2008 and led it to five straight SWAC regular-season titles (2019–20 to 2023–24), three SWAC tournament championships and NCAA appearances (2021, 2022, 2024), and a WNIT berth in 2023. She was also a four-time SWAC Coach of the Year (2020, 2022, 2023, 2024).

While at JSU, Reed coached the program's first-ever WNBA draft pick, Ameshya Williams-Holliday, who was taken 25th overall in 2022 by the Indiana Fever, and Angel Jackson, a 3rd-round selection by the Las Vegas Aces in 2024. She also coached Alexis Roberts, a member of the United States' gold medal-winning team in the 2022 Deaflympics.

On April 25, 2024, Reed was named the head coach at Charlotte.

== Personal life ==
Reed has a son, Carlon.

== Head coaching record ==
Statistics overview
Season	Team	Overall	Conference	Standing	Postseason
Jackson State (Southwestern Athletic Conference) (2018–2024)
2018–19	Jackson State	18–14	12–6	T-3rd	
2019–20	Jackson State	19–10	16–2	1st	Postseason cancelled due to COVID-19
2020–21	Jackson State	18–6	14–1	1st	NCAA First Round
2021–22	Jackson State	23–7	18–0	1st	NCAA First Round
2022–23	Jackson State	21–10	17–1	1st	WNIT First Round
2023–24	Jackson State	26–7	18–0	1st	NCAA First Round
Jackson State:		125–54 (.698)	95–10 (.905)		
Charlotte 49ers (American Athletic Conference) (2024–present)
2024–25	Charlotte	11–21	4–14	T–11th	
2025–26	Charlotte	14–18	8–10	T–7th	
Charlotte:		25–39 (.391)	12–24 (.333)		
Total:		150–93 (.617)			
National champion Postseason invitational champion Conference regular season champion Conference regular season and conference tournament champion Division regular season champion Division regular season and conference tournament champion Conference tournament champion
