= Kiefer Haffey =

American basketball coach

Current position
- Title: Head coach
- Team: Detroit Mercy
- Conference: Horizon
- Record: 7–24 (.226)

Biographical details
- Education: Wayne State (2017); Michigan (2020)

Coaching career (HC unless noted)
- –: Robichaud HS (asst.)
- 2017–2018: Concordia–Ann Arbor (asst.)
- 2018–2022: Concordia–Ann Arbor
- 2022–2024: Detroit Mercy (asst.)
- 2024–2025: Detroit Mercy (assoc. HC)
- 2025–present: Detroit Mercy

Head coaching record
- Overall: 61–58 (.513) (NAIA); 7–24 (.226) (NCAA D-I)

Kiefer Haffey is an American basketball coach, who is the current head coach of the Detroit Mercy Titans women's basketball team.

== Early life and education ==
While studying at Wayne State University, Haffey served as a student manager for the Wayne State Warriors men's basketball team.

== Coaching career ==
Haffey began his coaching career as assistant coach for the varsity girls basketball team at Robichaud High School in Dearborn, Michigan.

In 2017, Haffey was hired as an assistant coach at Concordia University Ann Arbor, prior to being promoted to head coach the following season. While at Concordia–Ann Arbor, Haffey coached the Cardinals to a 61–58 record over the course of four seasons.

On April 14, 2025, Haffey was announced as the 15th head coach in Detroit Mercy Titans program history. Prior to his hiring, Haffey spent three seasons as an assistant and associate head coach on Kate Achter's staff at the university.
