= Aarika Hughes =

American basketball coach (born 1987)

Loyola Marymount Lions
- Title: Head coach
- League: West Coast Conference

Personal information
- Born: September 5, 1987 (age 39) Milwaukee, Wisconsin, U.S.
- Listed height: 6 ft 2 in (1.88 m)

Career information
- High school: Southridge (Beaverton, Oregon)
- College: USC (2006–2010)
- Position: Shooting guard / small forward
- Coaching career: 2011–present

Career history

Coaching
- 2011–2016: New Mexico State (assistant)
- 2016–2017: New Mexico (assistant)
- 2017–2019: USC (assistant)
- 2019–2021: USC (associate HC)
- 2021–present: Loyola Marymount

Career highlights
- West Coast Conference Coach of the Year (2026)

Aarika Hughes (born September 5, 1987) is an American basketball coach who is currently the head women's basketball coach at Loyola Marymount University.

== Playing career ==
Hughes played college basketball at USC from 2006 to 2010, and was a three-year captain.

=== USC statistics ===
Ratios
Year	Team	GP	FG%	3P%	FT%	RBG	APG	BPG	SPG	PPG
2006–07	USC	18	33.3%	24.1%	33.3%	1.44	0.78	0.11	0.39	2.56
2007–08	USC	18	46.0%	40.9%	35.3%	3.89	0.78	0.33	0.44	5.78
2008–09	USC	32	32.7%	26.8%	47.5%	4.81	1.34	0.41	0.88	4.06
2009–10	USC	31	36.8%	33.8%	61.1%	5.13	0.81	0.10	0.81	7.03
Career		99	36.8%	32.0%	50.0%	4.13	0.97	0.24	0.69	5.03

Totals
Year	Team	GP	FG	FGA	3P	3PA	FT	FTA	REB	A	BK	ST	PTS
2006–07	USC	18	19	57	7	29	1	3	26	14	2	7	46
2007–08	USC	18	40	87	18	44	6	17	70	14	6	8	104
2008–09	USC	32	48	147	15	56	19	40	154	43	13	28	130
2009–10	USC	31	85	231	26	77	22	36	159	25	3	25	218
Career		99	192	522	66	206	48	96	409	96	24	68	498

== Coaching career ==
Hughes began her collegiate coaching career at New Mexico State on her former college coach Mark Trakh's staff. While at New Mexico State, she was named to the Women's Basketball Coaches Association's "Thirty under 30" list. After five seasons at New Mexico State, she spent one season at New Mexico on the inaugural staff of Mike Bradbury.

=== USC ===
Hughes joined the women's basketball staff at USC in 2017, working as an assistant under Trakh again.

=== Loyola Marymount ===
Hughes was named the women's basketball head coach at Loyola Marymount on April 17, 2021.
Hughes led the Lions to a regular season championship in the 2025-26 season for the first time since the 2003-04 season.
After leading the Lions to a WCC regular season title, Hughes was named WCC Coach of the Year.

== Head coaching record ==
Record table
Season	Team	Overall	Conference	Standing	Postseason
Loyola Marymount Lions (West Coast Conference) (2021–present)
2021–22	Loyola Marymount	11–19	4–13	9th	
2022–23	Loyola Marymount	7–23	4–14	10th	
2023–24	Loyola Marymount	11–19	5–11	7th	
2024–25	Loyola Marymount	14–16	7–13	9th	
2025–26	Loyola Marymount	21–10	15–3	1st	WBIT First Round
Loyola Marymount:		64–87 (.424)	35–54 (.393)		
Total:		64–87 (.424)			
National champion Postseason invitational champion Conference regular season champion Conference regular season and conference tournament champion Division regular season champion Division regular season and conference tournament champion Conference tournament champion
