= Toyelle Wilson =

American basketball coach

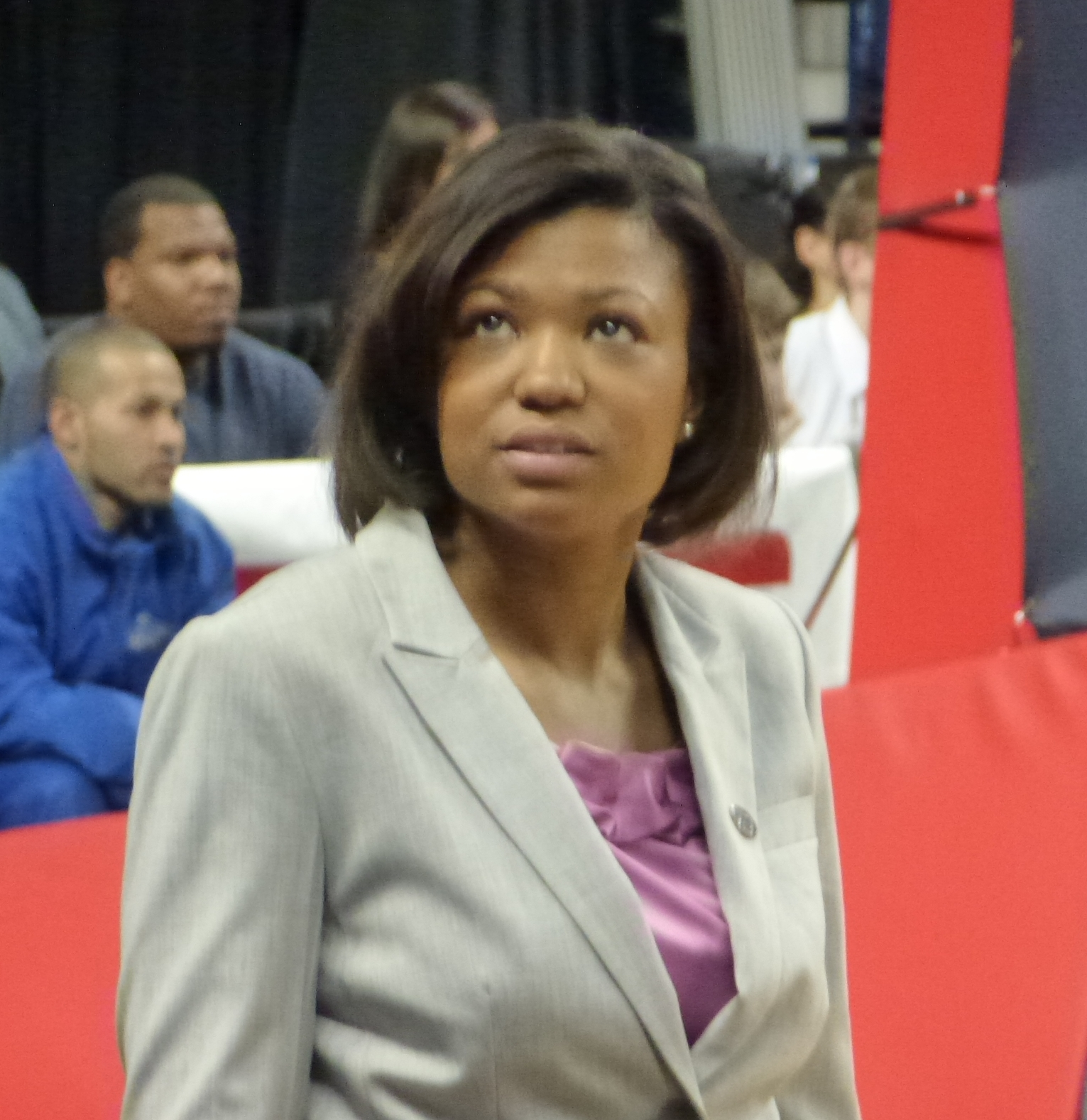
- Wilson at 2012 NCAA Tournament first round

Current position
- Title: Head coach
- Team: Texas A&M–Corpus Christi
- Conference: Southland
- Record: 6–23 (.207)

Biographical details
- Born: October 29, 1981 (age 45); Voorhees Township, New Jersey, U.S.

Playing career
- 2000–2003: Manhattan

Coaching career (HC unless noted)
- 2003–2006: Robert Morris (asst.)
- 2006–2010: Prairie View A&M (asst.)
- 2010–2013: Prairie View A&M
- 2013–2019: Baylor (asst.)
- 2019–2021: Michigan (asst.)
- 2021–2025: SMU
- 2025–present: Texas A&M–Corpus Christi

Head coaching record
- Overall: 116–130 (.472)
- Tournaments: NCAA Division I: 0–3 (.000); WNIT: 1–2 (.333)

Accomplishments and honors

Championships
- As a Head Coach: 3× SWAC tournament champions (2011–2013); As an Assistant: NCAA tournament champions (2019); 6× Big 12 Regular Season Champions (2013–2019) 5× Big 12 Tournament Champions (2013–16, 2018, 2019)

Toyelle Wilson (born October 29, 1981) is the head women's basketball coach for Texas A&M University–Corpus Christi. She previously served as an assistant coach at Michigan and Baylor. Wilson has also previously served as head coach of Prairie View A&M and Southern Methodist University.

A native of Voorhees Township, New Jersey, Wilson graduated from Eastern Regional High School. She played basketball for four seasons at Manhattan College, where she graduated in 2003 with a degree in business management.

== Coaching career ==
Wilson began her coaching career at Robert Morris in 2003 as an assistant. She was then hired at Prairie View A&M in 2006 in the same role under head coach and WNBA legend Cynthia Cooper.

=== Prairie View A&M ===
After Cooper was named the head coach at UNC Wilmington, Wilson was promoted to head coach. Wilson guided her team to three-consecutive SWAC Tournament Championships and NCAA Tournaments. During her time there, she never encountered a losing season and compiled an overall record of 55–43 with 36–18 in conference play.

=== Baylor ===
In 2013, Wilson was hired as an assistant at Baylor. In Wilson's six seasons at Baylor, the Lady Bears were the 2019 national champions, won six regular season Big 12 Conference championship and five conference tournament titles. Baylor also made four NCAA Elite Eight appearances and one NCAA Sweet 16 during her time in Waco.

On the recruiting trail, Wilson helped Baylor recruit top-10 recruiting classes every year, including the No. 1 recruiting class in the country in 2018.

=== Michigan ===
On May 20, 2019, Wilson was named an assistant coach and recruiting coordinator for the Michigan Wolverines women's basketball team. Wilson worked primarily with the post players, helping Naz Hillmon to her second-straight All-Big Ten first-team nod and WBCA All-America honorable mention and become Big Ten Player of the Year in 2021. On the recruiting trail, Michigan's 2020 recruiting class was ranked as high as No. 12.

=== SMU ===
On April 1, 2021, Wilson was named SMU's head coach.

== Head coaching record ==
=== College ===
Record table
Season	Team	Overall	Conference	Standing	Postseason
Prairie View A&M Lady Panthers (Southwestern Athletic Conference) (2010–2013)
2010–11	Prairie View A&M	21–12	14–4	2nd	NCAA round of 64
2011–12	Prairie View A&M	17–16	11–7	4th	NCAA round of 64
2012–13	Prairie View A&M	17–15	11–7	4th	NCAA round of 64
Prairie View A&M:		55–43 (.561)	36–18 (.667)		
SMU Mustangs (American Athletic Conference) (2021–2024)
2021–22	SMU	14–15	7–7	5th	WNIT first round
2022–23	SMU	17–13	7–8	5th	WNIT second round
2023–24	SMU	14–16	8–10	11th	
SMU Mustangs (Atlantic Coast Conference) (2024–2025)
2024–25	SMU	10–20	2–16	T–17th	
SMU:		55–64 (.462)	24–41 (.369)		
Texas A&M–Corpus Christi (Southland Conference) (2025–present)
2025–26	Texas A&M–Corpus Christi	6–23	5–17	10th	
Texas A&M–Corpus Christi:		6–23 (.207)	5–17 (.227)		
Total:		116–130 (.472)			
National champion Postseason invitational champion Conference regular season champion Conference regular season and conference tournament champion Division regular season champion Division regular season and conference tournament champion Conference tournament champion
