= Carlos Funchess =

American college basketball coach

- Funchess with Southern in 2026

Southern Lady Jaguars
- Title: Head coach
- Conference: Southwestern Athletic Conference

Personal information
- Born: February 13, 1969 (age 57) Magee, Mississippi, U.S.
- Listed height: 6 ft 3 in (1.91 m)
- Listed weight: 185 lb (84 kg)

Career information
- High school: Magee (Magee, Mississippi)
- College: Copiah–Lincoln CC (1987–1989); Louisiana–Monroe (1989–1991)
- NBA draft: 1991: undrafted
- Position: Shooting guard
- Coaching career: 2005–present

Career history

Playing
- 1992–1993: Sioux Falls Skyforce
- 1993–1994: Rockford Lightning

Coaching
- 2005–2018: Southern (assistant)
- 2018–present: Southern

Career highlights
- As player: Southland co-Player of the Year (1991); 2× First-team All-Southland (1990, 1991); As coach: Maggie Dixon Award (2019); 2× SWAC Coach of the Year (2019, 2025); 2× SWAC regular season champion (2019, 2025); 4× SWAC tournament champion (2019, 2023, 2025, 2026)

Carlos Funchess (born February 13, 1969) is an American college basketball coach for the Southern Lady Jaguars of the Southwestern Athletic Conference. He played college basketball for the Northeast Louisiana (now called Louisiana–Monroe) Warhawks and later professionally for several years.

Funchess was born and raised in Magee, Mississippi. After his prep career he played two seasons at Copiah–Lincoln Community College before transferring to Northeast Louisiana prior to the 1989–90 season. He led the Warhawks to consecutive Southland Conference regular season and tournament championships. As a senior, Funchess averaged 19.4 points and 5.8 rebounds per game and was named Southland Conference co-Player of the Year with teammate Anthony Jones.

Following his college career, Funchess played professionally in several North American minor leagues as well as in Venezuela. He played in the Continental Basketball Association (CBA) for the Sioux Falls Skyforce and Rockford Lightning. He played 19 games in his CBA career, averaging 5.6 points per game over two seasons.

After his playing career, Funchess joined the women's basketball coaching staff at Southern University in 2005. In 2018, he was hired as the head coach to replace Sandy Pugh, who left to coach Prairie View A&M. His first season was highly successful as the Lady Jaguars went 20–13 and won both the regular season and tournament championships in the Southwestern Athletic Conference (SWAC). He was named conference coach of the year and was recognized nationally as the Maggie Dixon Award winner as the top first-year head coach.

Funchess led the Lady Jaguars to the 2023 SWAC tournament title in his fifth season.
