= Charlotte 49ers women's basketball =

| 2025–26 Charlotte 49ers women's basketball team |
- University: University of North Carolina at Charlotte
- Head coach: Tomekia Reed (2nd season)
- Location: Charlotte, North Carolina
- Arena: Dale F. Halton Arena (capacity: 9,105)
- Conference: The American
- Nickname: 49ers
- Colors: Green and white

NCAA Division I tournament appearances
- 2003, 2009, 2022

Conference tournament champions
- Atlantic 10: 2009 CUSA: 2022

Conference regular-season champions
- Sun Belt: 1990 Atlantic 10: 2006 CUSA: 2003, 2022

Conference division champions
- 2022

Uniforms
| Home | Away |

The Charlotte 49ers women's basketball team represents University of North Carolina at Charlotte in women's basketball. The school competes in the American Conference in Division I of the National Collegiate Athletic Association (NCAA). The 49ers play home basketball games at Halton Arena in Charlotte, North Carolina.

== History ==
As of the end of the 2015–16 season (their 41st), they have an all-time record of 653–506. They have won five conference titles, winning them in 1990 (Sun Belt), 2003 (C-USA), 2006 (Atlantic-10), 2009 (Atlantic 10), and 2022 (Conference USA).

They played in the Sun Belt Conference from 1984 to 1991, the Metro Conference from 1991 to 1995, Conference USA from 1995–2005, 2013–2023, the Atlantic 10 Conference from 2006–2013 and the American Conference from 2023 to the present.

| Season | Coach | Record | Conference Record |
|---|---|---|---|
| 1975–76 | Judy Wilkins Rose | 6–9 | n/a |
| 1976–77 | Judy Wilkins Rose | 3–13 | n/a |
| 1977–78 | Judy Wilkins Rose | 11–8 | n/a |
| 1978–79 | Judy Wilkins Rose | 20–6 | n/a |
| 1979–80 | Judy Wilkins Rose | 21–6 | n/a |
| 1980–81 | Judy Wilkins Rose | 22–10 | n/a |
| 1981–82 | Judy Wilkins Rose | 10–13 | n/a |
| 1982–83 | Ann Payne | 15–12 | n/a |
| 1983–84 | Ann Payne | 21–8 | n/a |
| 1984–85 | Cindy Connelley | 13–12 | 2–4 |
| 1985–86 | Cindy Connelley | 15–13 | 3–3 |
| 1986–87 | Cindy Connelley | 18–9 | 1–5 |
| 1987–88 | Cindy Connelley | 10–17 | 1–5 |
| 1988–89 | Ed Baldwin | 12–16 | 1–5 |
| 1989–90 | Ed Baldwin | 24–8 | 4–2 |
| 1990–91 | Ed Baldwin | 23–6 | 4–2 |
| 1991–92 | Ed Baldwin | 20–8 | 8–4 |
| 1992–93 | Ed Baldwin | 16–12 | 6–6 |
| 1993–94 | Ed Baldwin | 14–13 | 4–8 |
| 1994–95 | Ed Baldwin | 13–13 | 3–9 |
| 1995–96 | Ed Baldwin | 10–18 | 4–8 |
| 1996–97 | Ed Baldwin | 7–20 | 2–12 |
| 1997–98 | Ed Baldwin | 10–18 | 5–11 |
| 1998–99 | Ed Baldwin | 6–21 | 3–13 |
| 1999–00 | Ed Baldwin | 10–20 | 3–13 |
| 2000–01 | Ed Baldwin | 10–18 | 5–11 |
| 2001–02 | Katie Meier | 16–13 | 7–7 |
| 2002–03 | Katie Meier | 21–9 | 12–2 |
| 2003–04 | Katie Meier | 17–14 | 8–6 |
| 2004–05 | Katie Meier | 22–9 | 9–5 |
| 2005–06 | Amanda Butler | 21–9 | 13–3 |
| 2006–07 | Amanda Butler | 19–13 | 9–5 |
| 2007–08 | Karen Aston | 18–14 | 9–5 |
| 2008–09 | Karen Aston | 23–9 | 11–3 |
| 2009–10 | Karen Aston | 18–14 | 9–5 |
| 2010–11 | Karen Aston | 27–10 | 9–5 |
| 2011–12 | Cara Consuegra | 16–14 | 8–6 |
| 2012–13 | Cara Consuegra | 26–6 | 13–1 |
| 2013–14 | Cara Consuegra | 15–16 | 9–7 |
| 2014–15 | Cara Consuegra | 15–17 | 10–8 |
| 2015–16 | Cara Consuegra | 19–12 | 12–6 |
| 2016–17 | Cara Consuegra | 21–10 | 12–6 |
| 2017–18 | Cara Consuegra | 14–16 | 10–6 |
| 2018–19 | Cara Consuegra | 18–13 | 9–7 |
| 2019–20 | Cara Consuegra | 20–9 | 11–7 |
| 2020–21 | Cara Consuegra | 10–12 | 9–5 |
| 2021–22 | Cara Consuegra | 22–9 | 15–3 |
| 2022–23 | Cara Consuegra | 12–19 | 7–13 |

== NCAA tournament results ==
The 49ers have appeared in three NCAA Tournaments, with a combined record of 0–3.

| Year | Seed | Round | Opponent | Result |
|---|---|---|---|---|
| 2003 | 12 | First Round | (5) Georgia | L 61—80 |
| 2009 | 11 | First Round | (6) Purdue | L 52—65 |
| 2022 | 14 | First Round | (3) Indiana | L 51—85 |
