= Detroit Mercy Titans women's basketball =

College women's basketball team at the University of Detroit Mercy

Detroit Mercy Titans
2026–27 Detroit Mercy Titans women's basketball team
- University: University of Detroit Mercy
- First season: 1977–78
- Head coach: Kiefer Haffey (2nd season)
- Location: Detroit, Michigan
- Arena: Calihan Hall (capacity: 8,295)
- Conference: Horizon League
- Nickname: Titans
- Colors: Red, white, and blue

NCAA Division I tournament appearances
- 1997

AIAW tournament appearances
- 1980

Conference tournament champions
- 1997

Conference regular-season champions
- 1987, 1997

Uniforms
Home	Away

The Detroit Mercy Titans women's basketball team is the college basketball team that represents the University of Detroit Mercy in Detroit, Michigan, and competes in NCAA Division I women's basketball as a member of the Horizon League.

== History ==
The Titans began to play in 1977. As of the end of the 2015–16 season, they have an all-time record of 575–557. They lost to Kansas (as a 14 seed) 81–67 in the first round of the 1997 NCAA Tournament, which remains their only appearance in the Tournament. They played in the North Star Conference from 1984 to 1986. Detroit made an appearance in the WNIT in 2012 and the Women's Basketball Invitational in 2013, winning the title in the latter appearance.

The program went through turmoil in the 2020–21 season. During that season, extensively affected by the COVID-19 pandemic, Detroit Mercy was one of several Division I programs that canceled its season early, but the only one that did so for reasons unrelated to the pandemic. On January 17, 2021, the parents of all 14 players on the roster sent a letter to athletic director Robert Vowels Jr. alleging NCAA rules violations, as well as rampant emotional and physical abuse, by first-year head coach AnnMarie Gilbert. After an internal investigation, Detroit Mercy retained Gilbert, but after all 14 players on the 2020–21 roster left the program, (Note: Due to the COVID-19 pandemic, the NCAA ruled that the 2020–21 season would not be counted against the athletic eligibility of any basketball player. This meant that seniors, who otherwise would have exhausted their NCAA eligibility, could return for the 2021–22 season.) Gilbert resigned on June 15, with assistant LaTanya Collins named interim head coach for the 2021–22 season.

== Postseason results ==
=== NCAA Division I ===
Year	Seed	Round	Opponent	Result
1997	14	First Round	(3) Kansas	L 67–81

=== AIAW Division I ===
The Titans made one appearance in the AIAW National Division I basketball tournament, with a combined record of 0–1.

Year	Round	Opponent	Result
1980	First Round	NC State	L 61–70
