= Texas A&M–Corpus Christi Islanders women's basketball =

Texas A&M–Corpus Christi Islanders
2025–26 Texas A&M–Corpus Christi Islanders women's basketball team
- University: Texas A&M University–Corpus Christi
- Head coach: Toyelle Wilson (1st season)
- Location: Corpus Christi, Texas
- Arena: (1) American Bank Center (2) Dugan Wellness Center (capacity: (1) 8,500; (2) 1,100)
- Conference: Southland
- Nickname: Islanders
- Colors: Royal blue, white, and green

NCAA Division I tournament appearances
- 2024

Conference tournament champions
- 2024

Conference regular-season champions
- 2020, 2023

For information on all Texas A&M–Corpus Christi sports, see Texas A&M–Corpus Christi Islanders

The Texas A&M–Corpus Christi Islanders women's basketball team is the women's basketball team that represents Texas A&M University–Corpus Christi in Corpus Christi, Texas. The team currently competes in the Southland Conference. The Islanders are currently coached by Toyelle Wilson. The team plays its home games at the American Bank Center and the on–campus Dugan Wellness Center.

== Roster ==
2024–25 Texas A&M–Corpus Christi Islanders women's basketball team
Players
Coaches

Pos.	#	Name	Height	Year	Previous school	Hometown
G	0	Naiya Carney	5 ft 6 in (1.68 m)	Fr	Skyline High School	Dallas, Texas
G	1	Natalie Huff	5 ft 7 in (1.7 m)	Fr	Tom C. Clark High School	San Antonio, Texas
G	2	Tymberlin Criswell	5 ft 8 in (1.73 m)	Sr	SMU	Houston, Texas
G	3	Jaeda Whitner	5 ft 5 in (1.65 m)	Sr	Mason City High School	Mason City, Iowa
G	4	Kimora Fagan	5 ft 7 in (1.7 m)	Fr	Edinburg High School	Edinburg, Texas
G	5	Samora Watson	5 ft 6 in (1.68 m)	Jr	Central Connecticut	Eunice, Louisiana
G	9	Miriam Vilafranca	5 ft 8 in (1.73 m)	Fr	Joventut Badalona	Barcelona, Spain
F	10	Monae' Duffy	5 ft 10 in (1.78 m)	Jr	Hutchinson Community College	Lafayette, Louisiana
G/F	11	Paige Allen	5 ft 8 in (1.73 m)	GS	Oak Park High School	Kansas City, Missouri
G/F	12	Logan Reed	6 ft 0 in (1.83 m)	Fr	Godley High School	Godley, Texas
C	14	Bruna Anguera	6 ft 2 in (1.88 m)	Jr	IES Llavaneres	El Morell, Spain
F	15	Claudia Diez	6 ft 3 in (1.91 m)	So	Valencia Basket	Valencia, Spain
C	20	Torie Sevier	6 ft 4 in (1.93 m)	Fr	Braswell High School	Aubrey, Texas
G	25	Mireia Aguado	5 ft 9 in (1.75 m)	GS	Josep tous	Barcelona, Spain
G	30	Annukka Willstedt	5 ft 9 in (1.75 m)	Sr	IES Diego Velazquez	Torrelodones, Spain
F	32	Nabaweeyah McGill	6 ft 2 in (1.88 m)	GS	Carrollwood Day School	Tampa, Florida

Head coach

- Royce Chadwick (Southwestern Oklahoma State)

Assistant coach(es)

- Roxanne White (Stephen F. Austin)
- Darren Brunson (St. Mary's (TX))
- Gee Lawler (Texas A&M–Corpus Christi)

Legend

- (C) Team captain
- (S) Suspended
- (I) Ineligible
- (W) Walk-on
- Injured
- Current redshirt

Roster
Last update: March 3, 2025

== Postseason results ==
=== NCAA tournament results ===
The Islanders have appeared in the NCAA tournament one time. Their combined record is 0–1.

Year	Seed	Round	Opponent	Result
2024	#16	First round	#1 USC	55–87

=== WINT results ===
The Islanders have appeared in the Women's National Invitation Tournament (WNIT) two times. Their combined record is 1–2.

Year	Round	Opponent	Result
2005	First round Second round	Fresno State; Texas A&M	W 56–53^{OT} L 65–69
2023	First round	Wyoming	L 41–75

=== WBI results ===
The Islanders have appeared in the Women's Basketball Invitational (WBI) one time. Their combined record is 2–1.

Year	Round	Opponent	Result
2010	First round Quarterfinals; Semi-finals	Cal State Bakersfield; Washington; Memphis	W 97–89; W 59–58; L 55–80

== Year by year results ==
Conference tournament winners noted with # Source

Season	Team	Overall	Conference	Standing	Postseason	Coaches' poll	AP poll
Sheryl Estes (Independent) (1999–2002)
1999–2000	Sheryl Estes	14-12	–				
2000–01	Sheryl Estes	16-11	–				
2001–02	Sheryl Estes	16-12	–				
Sheryl Estes:		46–35	–				
Jodi Kest (Independent) (2002–2006)
2002–03	Jodi Kest	15-12	–				
2003–04	Jodi Kest	19-9	–				
2004–05	Jodi Kest	23-7	–		WNIT Second Round		
2005–06	Jodi Kest	16-12	–				
Jodi Kest:		73–40	–				
Robert Robinson (Southland) (2006–2012)
2006–07	Robert Robinson	15-16	9-7	4th			
2007–08	Robert Robinson	12-20	7-9	5th			
2008–09	Robert Robinson	11-19	6-10	4th			
2009–10	Robert Robinson	24-11	12–4	2nd	WBI Semis		
2010–11	Robert Robinson	2-27	0–16	6th			
2011–12	Robert Robinson	9-20	5–11	4th			
Robert Robinson:		73–113	39–57				
Royce Chadwick (Southland) (2012–present)
2012–13	Royce Chadwick	4-25	3–15	4th			
2013–14	Royce Chadwick	18-12	11–7	4th			
2014–15	Royce Chadwick	16-14	12–6	4th			
2015–16	Royce Chadwick	9-20	6–12	10th			
2016–17	Royce Chadwick	14-18	8–10	6th			
2017–18	Royce Chadwick	19-12	11–7	4th			
2018–19	Royce Chadwick	17-16	8–10	6th			
2019–20	Royce Chadwick	23-7	17–3	1st			
2020–21	Royce Chadwick	6-13	4–7	11th			
2021–22	Royce Chadwick	19-10	11–3	2nd			
Royce Chadwick:		145–147	91–80				
Total:		337–335					
National champion Postseason invitational champion Conference regular season champion Conference regular season and conference tournament champion Division regular season champion Division regular season and conference tournament champion Conference tournament champion
