= Loyola Marymount Lions women's basketball =

Loyola Marymount Lions
2025–26 Loyola Marymount Lions women's basketball team
- University: Loyola Marymount University
- Head coach: Aarika Hughes (5th season)
- Conference: West Coast Conference
- Location: Los Angeles, California
- Arena: Gersten Pavilion (capacity: 4,156)
- Nickname: Lions
- Colors: Crimson and blue

Uniforms
Home	Away	Alternate

NCAA tournament appearances
- 2004

Conference tournament champions
- 2004

Conference regular-season champions
- 2004, 2026

The Loyola Marymount Lions women's basketball team is the basketball team that represents Loyola Marymount University in Los Angeles, California, United States. The school's team currently competes in the West Coast Conference.

== History ==
Loyola Marymount began play in 1981. The Lions have an all-time record of 395–552 as of the 2015–16 season. In 2004, they won the West Coast Conference title, going 24–6 (13–1 in WCC play) while beating Gonzaga 61–58 to win their first ever conference tournament. They have finished as runner up in 2001 and 2007. In the former, they went to the WNIT, losing 59–56 to UNLV. In their first (and so far only) NCAA Tournament appearance in 2004, they lost 71–60 to Baylor.

== NCAA tournament results ==
Year	Seed	Round	Opponent	Result
2004	#13	First Round	#4 Baylor	L 60−71
