= Alcorn State Lady Braves basketball =

Alcorn State Braves
2026–27 Alcorn State Lady Braves basketball team
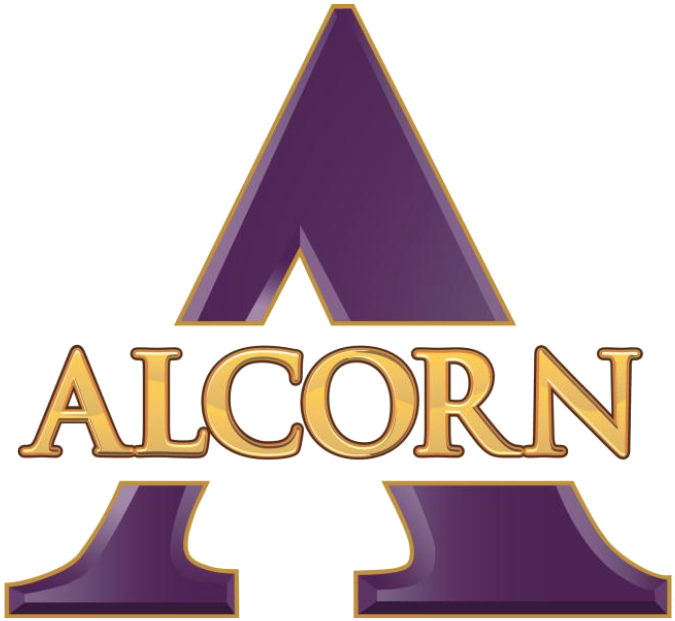
- University: Alcorn State University
- Head coach: Nate Kilbert (7th season)
- Location: Lorman, Mississippi
- Arena: Davey Whitney Complex (capacity: 7,000)
- Conference: SWAC
- Nickname: Lady Braves
- Colors: Purple and gold

NCAA Division I tournament appearances
- 2000, 2001, 2005

Conference tournament champions
- 1986, 1991, 1992, 2000, 2001, 2005

Conference regular-season champions
- 1984, 1985, 1986, 1991, 1992, 1993, 1994, 1995, 1996, 2001, 2005

The Alcorn State Lady Braves basketball team is the women's basketball team that represents Alcorn State University in Lorman, Mississippi, United States. The school's team currently competes in the Southwestern Athletic Conference.

== NCAA Division I Tournament appearances ==
Year	Round	Opponent	Result
2000	First Round	#1 Louisiana Tech	L 53–95
2001	First Round	#1 Notre Dame	L 49–98
2005	First Round	#1 Michigan State	L 41–73
