= SMU Mustangs women's basketball =

| 2026–27 SMU Mustangs women's basketball team |
- University: Southern Methodist University
- Head coach: Adia Barnes (2nd season)
- Location: University Park, Texas
- Arena: Moody Coliseum (capacity: 7,000)
- Conference: Atlantic Coast
- Nickname: Mustangs
- Colors: Red and blue

NCAA Division I tournament second round
- 1995, 1999, 2000

NCAA Division I tournament appearances
- 1994, 1995, 1996, 1998, 1999, 2000, 2008

Conference tournament champions
- 1999, 2008

Uniforms
| Home | Away |

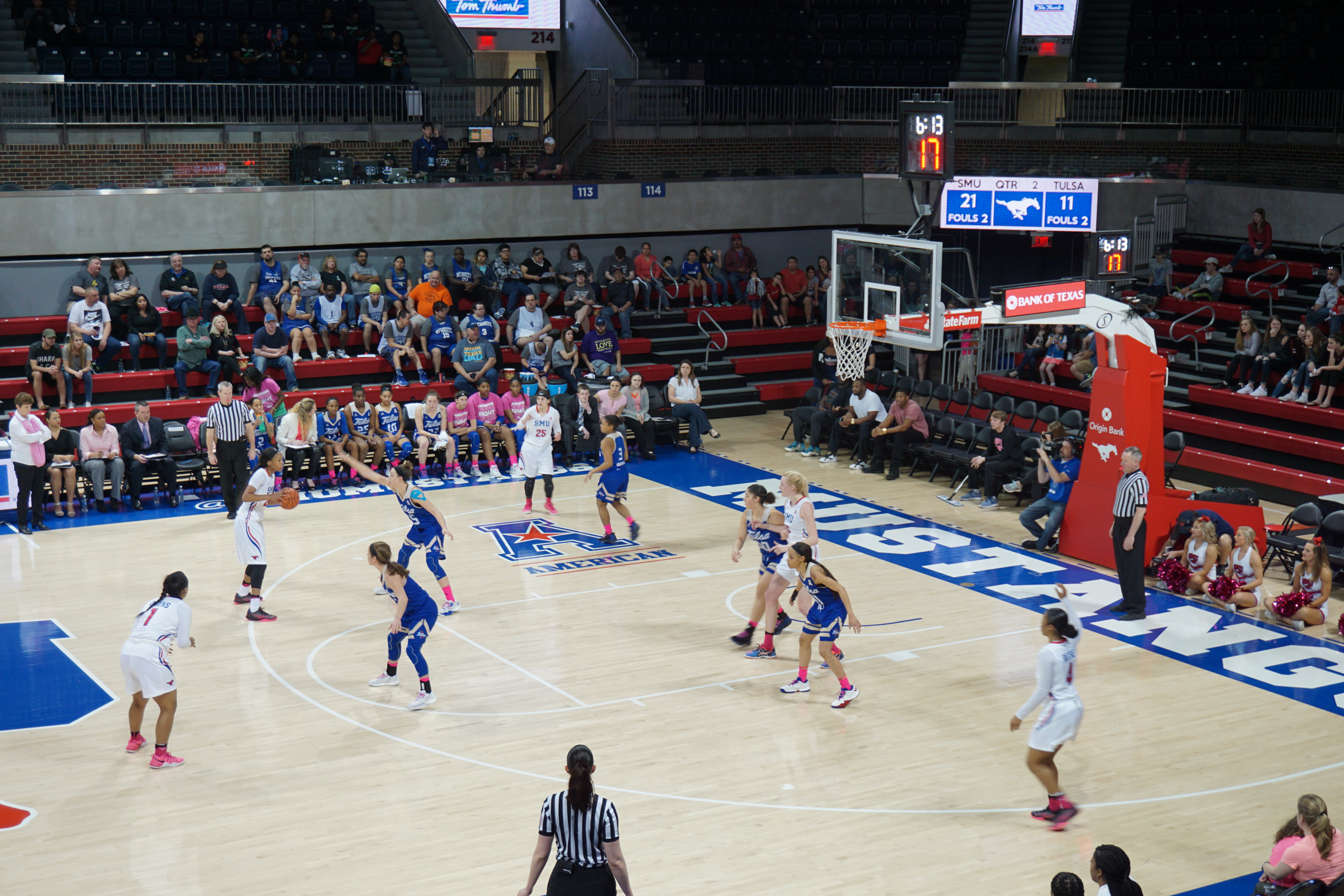
2016–17 SMU team playing against Tulsa at Moody Coliseum

The SMU Mustangs women's basketball team represents Southern Methodist University in women's basketball. The school competes in the Atlantic Coast Conference in Division I of the National Collegiate Athletic Association (NCAA). The Mustangs play home basketball games at the Moody Coliseum in University Park, Texas, an enclave of Dallas.

== Year by year record ==
As of the 2015–16 season, the Mustangs have a 611–560 all-time record, with a 257–257 conference record and NCAA Tournament appearances in 1994, 1995, 1996, 1998, 1999, 2000, and 2008 and six appearances in the Women's National Invitation Tournament.

| Season | Record | Coach | Conference Record | Conference Finish | Postseason Result |
|---|---|---|---|---|---|
| 1976–77 | 10–9 | Suzanne Trautmann | n/a | n/a | TAIAW playoffs |
| 1977–78 | 12–13 | Welton Brown | n/a | n/a | TAIAW playoffs |
| 1978–79 | 14–14 | Welton Brown | n/a | n/a | TAIAW playoffs |
| 1979–80 | 15–14 | Welton Brown | n/a | n/a | TAIAW playoffs |
| 1980–81 | 14–19 | Welton Brown | n/a | n/a | TAIAW playoffs |
| 1981–82 | 18–15 | Welton Brown | n/a | n/a | TAIAW playoffs |
| 1982–83 | 14–14 | Welton Brown | 4–4 | T-6th in SWC | None |
| 1983–84 | 11–15 | Welton Brown | 4–12 | 7th in SWC | None |
| 1984–85 | 9–19 | Welton Brown | 4–12 | 7th in SWC | None |
| 1985–86 | 11–20 | Welton Brown | 5–11 | 6th in SWC | None |
| 1986–87 | 8–19 | Welton Brown | 4–12 | 8th in SWC | None |
| 1987–88 | 12–16 | Welton Brown | 6–10 | 6th in SWC | None |
| 1988–89 | 11–14 | Welton Brown | 7–9 | 7th in SWC | None |
| 1989–90 | 4–22 | Welton Brown | 2–14 | 8th in SWC | None |
| 1990–91 | 9–19 | Welton Brown | 4–12 | T-6th in SWC | None |
| 1991–92 | 17–12 | Rhonda Rompola | 7–7 | T-4th in SWC | None |
| 1992–93 | 20–10 | Rhonda Rompola | 8–6 | 3rd in SWC | WNIT Finalist |
| 1993–94 | 18–9 | Rhonda Rompola | 8–6 | 4th in SWC | NCAA Mideast – 1st round |
| 1994–95 | 21–10 | Rhonda Rompola | 9–5 | T-2nd in SWC | NCAA West – 2nd round |
| 1995–96 | 19–11 | Rhonda Rompola | 9–5 | 3rd in SWC | NCAA Mideast – 1st round |
| 1996–97 | 19–11 | Rhonda Rompola | 11–5 | 3rd in WAC Mountain | None |
| 1997–98 | 21–8 | Rhonda Rompola | 11–3 | T-2nd in WAC Pacific | NCAA East – 1st round |
| 1998–99 | 20–11 | Rhonda Rompola | 11–3 | 2nd in WAC Mountain | NCAA Mideast – 2nd round |
| 1999-00 | 22–9 | Rhonda Rompola | 12–2 | 1st in WAC | NCAA Midwest – 2nd round |
| 2000–01 | 17–12 | Rhonda Rompola | 11–5 | 3rd in WAC | None |
| 2001–02 | 12–18 | Rhonda Rompola | 6–12 | 7th in WAC | None |
| 2002–03 | 16–15 | Rhonda Rompola | 8–10 | 7th in WAC | None |
| 2003–04 | 13–15 | Rhonda Rompola | 9–9 | 5th in WAC | None |
| 2004–05 | 19–11 | Rhonda Rompola | 10–8 | 5th in WAC | WNIT First Round |
| 2005–06 | 16–14 | Rhonda Rompola | 10–6 | 3rd in Conference USA | None |
| 2006–07 | 18–12 | Rhonda Rompola | 9–7 | 6th in Conference USA | None |
| 2007–08 | 24–9 | Rhonda Rompola | 11–5 | 2nd in Conference USA | NCAA 1st Round |
| 2008–09 | 20–12 | Rhonda Rompola | 12–4 | 1st in Conference USA | WNIT First Round |
| 2009–10 | 20–11 | Rhonda Rompola | 10–6 | 2nd in Conference USA | WNIT First Round |
| 2010–11 | 14–16 | Rhonda Rompola | 7–9 | 8th in Conference USA | None |
| 2011–12 | 14–17 | Rhonda Rompola | 6–10 | T-9th in Conference USA | None |
| 2012–13 | 21–10 | Rhonda Rompola | 12–4 | 1st in Conference USA | WNIT First Round |
| 2013–14 | 18–14 | Rhonda Rompola | 8–10 | 6th in AAC | WNIT Second Round |
| 2014–15 | 7–23 | Rhonda Rompola | 3–15 | 10th in AAC | None |
| 2015–16 | 13–18 | Rhonda Rompola | 7–11 | 7th in AAC | None |
| 2016–17 | 19–15 | Travis Mays | 7–9 | 5th in AAC | WNIT Third Round |
| 2017–18 | 10–20 | Travis Mays | 4–12 | 10th in AAC | None |
| 2018–19 | 11–19 | Travis Mays | 5–11 | T-8th in AAC | None |
| 2019–20 | 13–16 | Travis Mays | 7–9 | T-6th in AAC | None |
| 2020–21 | 0–6 | Travis Mays | 0–2 | 11th in AAC | None |
| 2021–22 | 14–15 | Toyelle Wilson | 7–7 | 5th in AAC | WNIT First Round |
| 2022–23 | 17–13 | Toyelle Wilson | 7–8 | 5th in AAC | WNIT Second Round |
| 2023–24 | 14–16 | Toyelle Wilson | 8–10 | 11th in AAC | None |
| 2024–25 | 10–20 | Toyelle Wilson | 2–16 | T-17th in ACC | None |
| 2025–26 | 9–21 | Adia Barnes | 2–16 | 16th in ACC | None |
| 2026–27 | 2–0 | Adia Barnes | 0–0 | | |

== NCAA tournament results ==
SMU has reached the NCAA Division I women's basketball tournament seven times. They have a record of 3–7.

| Year | Seed | Round | Opponent | Result |
|---|---|---|---|---|
| 1994 | #13 | First Round | #4 Louisiana Tech | L 62–96 |
| 1995 | #10 | First Round; Second Round | #7 Southern Miss #2 Stanford | W 96–95 (OT); L 73–95 |
| 1996 | #10 | First Round | #7 DePaul | L 82–96 |
| 1998 | #11 | First Round | #6 Virginia | L 68–77 |
| 1999 | #11 | First Round; Second Round | #6 Toledo #3 Georgia | W 91–76; L 55–68 |
| 2000 | #12 | First Round; Second Round | #5 NC State #4 Old Dominion | W 64–63; L 76–96 |
| 2008 | #12 | First Round | #5 Notre Dame | L 62–75 |

== Roster ==
2026–27 SMU Mustangs women's basketball team
Players
Coaches

| Pos. | # | Name | Height | Year | Previous school | Hometown |
|---|---|---|---|---|---|---|
| G | 0 | Izela Arenas | 5 ft 8 in (1.73 m) | Jr | Kansas State | Los Angeles, CA |
| G | 1 | Theresa Hagans Jr. | 5 ft 9 in (1.75 m) | So | Pittsburgh | Utica, NY |
| G | 2 | Zahra King | 5 ft 10 in (1.78 m) | Jr | California | Brooklyn, NY |
| G | 4 | Shania James | 5 ft 6 in (1.68 m) | Fr | Example Academy | North Chicago, IL |
| F | 5 | Zoe Osby | 6 ft 1 in (1.85 m) | Fr | Elizabeth Seton | Upper Marlboro, MD |
| F | 12 | Kinsea Grimes | 6 ft 0 in (1.83 m) | So | Coastal Carolina | Mansfield, TX |
| G | 13 | Mailien Rolf | 5 ft 10 in (1.78 m) | RS So | Arizona | Roßdorf, Germany |
| F | 17 | Adja Kane | 6 ft 3 in (1.91 m) | Fr | Landerneau | Olivet, France |
| C | 19 | Camille Nesmith | 6 ft 3 in (1.91 m) | Fr | St. John's College | Washington, D.C. |
| G | 20 | Elise Hill | 5 ft 7 in (1.7 m) | RS Jr | Tulsa | Tulsa, OK |
| F | 21 | Kaylin Jackson | 6 ft 2 in (1.88 m) | Fr | Billy Ryan | Denton, TX |
| F | 22 | Grace Ezebilo | 6 ft 1 in (1.85 m) | Sr | Charleston | Anambra, Nigeria |
| F | 42 | Roxy White | 5 ft 11 in (1.8 m) | RS Fr | Example Academy | Homewood, IL |

Head coach

- Adia Barnes (Arizona)

Assistant coach(es)

- Salvo Coppa (IULM University of Milan)
- Coquese Washington (Notre Dame)
- Anthony Turner (Colorado)
- Amy Pryor (Oklahoma Baptist)

Legend

- (C) Team captain
- (S) Suspended
- (I) Ineligible
- (W) Walk-on
- Injured
- Current redshirt

Roster
Last update: August 30, 2026
