= Southern Lady Jaguars basketball =

2026–27 Southern Lady Jaguars basketball team
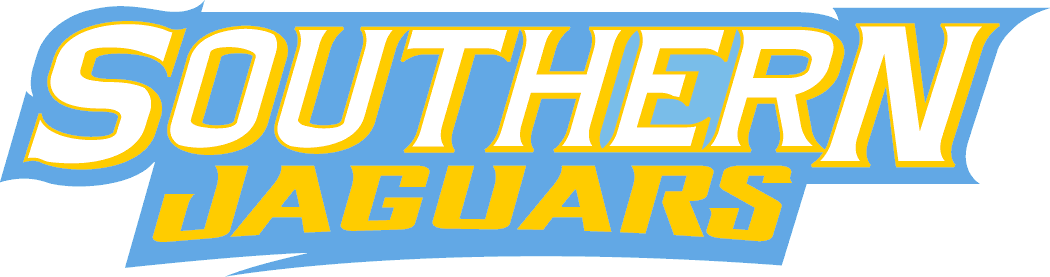
- University: Southern University
- Head coach: Carlos Funchess (9th season)
- Location: Baton Rouge, Louisiana
- Arena: F. G. Clark Center (capacity: 7,500)
- Conference: SWAC
- Nickname: Lady Jaguars
- Colors: Columbia blue and gold

NCAA Division I tournament appearances
- 2002, 2004, 2006, 2010, 2019, 2023, 2025, 2026

Conference tournament champions
- 2002, 2004, 2006, 2010, 2019, 2023, 2025, 2026

Conference regular-season champions
- 1993, 2002, 2006, 2010, 2011, 2014, 2019, 2025

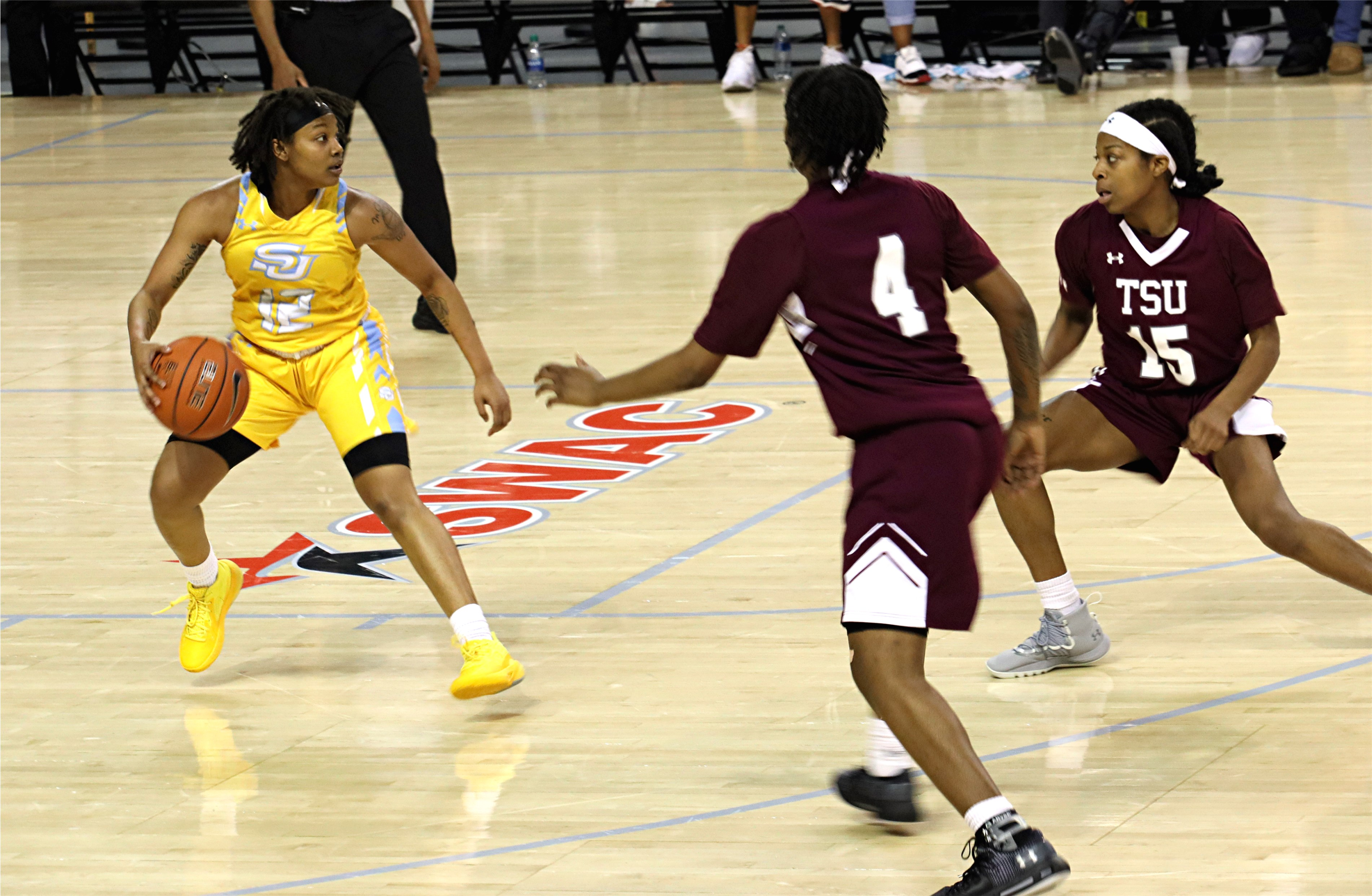
A basketball game between the Lady Jaguars and Texas Southern in 2022

The Southern Lady Jaguars basketball team is the basketball team that represents Southern University in Baton Rouge, Louisiana. The school's team currently competes in the Southwestern Athletic Conference.

== Postseason appearances ==
=== NCAA Division I Tournament appearances ===
The Lady Jaguars have appeared in the NCAA Division I women's basketball tournament eight times. Their combined record is 2–8.

Year	Seed	Round	Opponent	Result
2002	#14	First Round	#3 Colorado	L 61–88
2004	#16	First Round	#1 Texas	L 57–92
2006	#16	First Round	#1 Duke	L 27–96
2010	#16	First Round	#1 Connecticut	L 39–95
2019	#16	First Round	#1 Mississippi State	L 46–103
2023	#16	First Four	#16 Sacred Heart	L 57–47
2025	#16	First Four; First round	#16 UC San Diego #1 UCLA	W 68–56; L 46–84
2026	#16	First Four; First Round	#16 Samford #1 South Carolina	W 65–53; L 34–103

=== WNIT appearances ===
The Lady Jaguars have appeared in the Women's National Invitation Tournament three times. Their combined record is 0–3.

Year	Round	Opponent	Result
2009	First Round	New Mexico	L 44–72
2011	First Round	Tulane	L 31–61
2016	First Round	Arkansas State	L 45–68
