= Grambling State Tigers women's basketball =

Collegiate basketball team

Grambling State Tigers
2025–26 Grambling State Tigers women's basketball team
- University: Grambling State University
- Head coach: Courtney Simmons (3rd season)
- Location: Grambling, Louisiana
- Arena: Fredrick C. Hobdy Assembly Center (capacity: 7,500)
- Conference: SWAC
- Nickname: Lady Tigers
- Colors: Black, gold, and red

NCAA Division I tournament appearances
- 1994, 1996, 1997, 1998, 1999, 2018

Conference tournament champions
- 1988, 1994, 1996, 1997, 1998, 1999, 2018

Conference regular-season champions
- 1987, 1989, 1990, 1995, 1997, 1998, 1999, 2000, 2017

Uniforms
Home	Away

The Grambling State Tigers women's basketball team represents Grambling State University in Grambling, Louisiana. The team currently competes in the Southwestern Athletic Conference.

== NCAA Division I Tournament appearances ==
The Tigers have appeared in six NCAA Division I Tournaments. They have a record of 0–6.

Year	Round	Opponent	Result
1994	First Round	#2 Vanderbilt	L 85–95
1996	First Round	#1 Stanford	L 43–82
1997	First Round	#3 Tennessee	L 54–91
1998	First Round	#1 Texas Tech	L 75–87
1999	First Round	#5 Alabama	L 68–80
2018	First Round	#2 Baylor	L 46–96

== Other ==
On January 2, 2024, the Tigers won in a game against the College of Biblical Studies with a score of 159–18, which set a record for the biggest margin of victory in Division I women’s basketball (141 points).
