= Alabama State Lady Hornets basketball =

Women's college basketball team

Alabama State Hornets
2026–27 Alabama State Lady Hornets basketball team
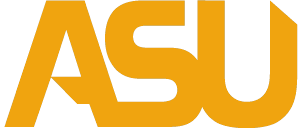
- University: Alabama State University
- Athletic director: Dr. Jason Cable
- Head coach: Johnetta Hayes (1st season)
- Location: Montgomery, Alabama
- Arena: Dunn–Oliver Acadome (capacity: 7,400)
- Conference: SWAC
- Nickname: Lady Hornets
- Colors: Black and old gold

NCAA Division I tournament appearances
- 2003, 2015, 2016

Conference tournament champions
- 1989, 2003, 2015, 2016

Conference regular-season champions
- 2003, 2004, 2015, 2016

The Alabama State Lady Hornets basketball team is the women's basketball team that represents Alabama State University in Montgomery, Alabama, United States. The school's team currently competes in the NCAA Division I as members of the Southwestern Athletic Conference (SWAC).

== History ==
Alabama State began play in 1974. They played in the AIAW from 1974 to 1982 before joining the NCAA and the SWAC in 1982.

== Postseason appearances ==
=== NCAA Division I ===
The Lady Hornets have appeared in the NCAA Division I women's basketball tournament three times. They have a combined record of 0–3.

Year	Seed	Round	Opponent	Result
2003	#16	First Round	#1 Tennessee	L 43–95
2015	#15	First Round	#2 Florida State	L 49–91
2016	#15	First Round	#2 Texas	L 42–86
