= Jackson State Lady Tigers basketball =

Women's college basketball team

Jackson State Tigers
2024–25 Jackson State Lady Tigers basketball team
- University: Jackson State University
- Head coach: Margaret Richards (1st season)
- Location: Jackson, Mississippi
- Arena: Williams Assembly Center (capacity: 8,000)
- Conference: SWAC
- Nickname: Lady Tigers
- Colors: Navy blue, white, and light blue

NCAA Division I tournament First Four
- 1983

NCAA Division I tournament appearances
- 1982, 1983, 1995, 2008, 2021, 2022, 2024

AIAW tournament second round
- 1981

AIAW tournament appearances
- 1981

Conference tournament champions
- 1982, 1983, 1984, 1985, 1990, 1995, 2008, 2021, 2022, 2024

Conference regular-season champions
- 1982, 1983, 1995, 1996, 2003, 2006, 2007, 2020, 2021, 2022, 2023, 2024

Uniforms
Home	Away

The Jackson State Lady Tigers basketball team is the women's basketball team that represents Jackson State University in Jackson, Mississippi. They play in the Southwestern Athletic Conference (SWAC).

== Postseason results ==
=== NCAA Division I ===
The Lady Tigers have appeared in seven NCAA Division I women's basketball tournament's and have an overall record of 0–7.

Year	Seed	Round	Opponent	Result
1982	#7	First Round	#2 Tennessee	L 56–72
1983	n/a	Opening Round	Middle Tennessee State	L 61–64
1995	#15	First Round	#2 Penn State	L 62–75
2008	#15	First Round	#2 LSU	L 32–66
2021	#15	First Round	#2 Baylor	L 52–101
2022	#14	First Round	#3 LSU	L 77–83
2024	#14	First Round	#3 UConn	L 64–86

=== WNIT ===
The Lady Tigers have a WNIT record of 0–2.

Year	Round	Opponent	Result
2006	First Round	Rice	L 48–64
2007	First Round	Tulane	L 43–76

=== AIAW Division I ===
The Lady Tigers made one appearance in the AIAW National Division I basketball tournament, with a combined record of 1–1.

Year	Round	Opponent	Result
1981	First Round; Second Round	Minnesota; Louisiana Tech	W, 68–65; L, 50–97
