= Prairie View A&M Lady Panthers basketball =

Prairie View A&M Panthers
2025–26 Prairie View A&M Lady Panthers basketball team
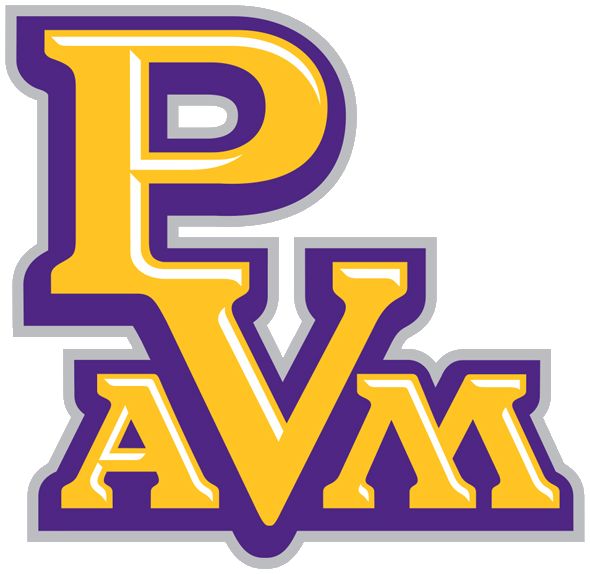
- University: Prairie View A&M University
- Head coach: Tai Dillard (1st season)
- Location: Prairie View, Texas
- Arena: William J. Nicks Building (capacity: 6,500)
- Conference: SWAC
- Nickname: Lady Panthers
- Colors: Purple and gold

NCAA Division I tournament appearances
- 2007, 2009, 2011, 2012, 2013, 2014

Conference tournament champions
- 2007, 2009, 2011, 2012, 2013, 2014

Conference regular-season champions
- 2007, 2008, 2009

Uniforms
Home	Away

The Prairie View A&M Lady Panthers basketball team is the women's basketball team that represents Prairie View A&M University in Prairie View, Texas, United States. The school's team currently competes in the Southwestern Athletic Conference (SWAC).

== Postseason appearances ==
=== NCAA Division I Tournament appearances ===
Year	Round	Opponent	Result
2007	First Round	#1 North Carolina	L 38–95
2009	First Round	#1 Oklahoma	L 47–76
2011	First Round	#1 Baylor	L 30–66
2012	First Round	#1 Connecticut	L 47–83
2013	First Round	#1 Baylor	L 40–82
2014	First Round	#1 Connecticut	L 44–87

=== WNIT appearances ===
Year	Round	Opponent	Result
2008	First Round	Texas State	L 83–84
2009	First Round	Kansas	L 70–82
