= 2025–26 East Carolina Pirates women's basketball team =

American college basketball season

2025–26 East Carolina Pirates women's basketball
- Conference: American Conference
- Record: 22–10 (14–4 American)
- Head coach: Kim McNeill (7th season)
- Assistant coaches: Jason Harris; Tamoria Holmes; Jeffrey Williams
- Home arena: Williams Arena

2025–26 American Conference women's basketball standings
	Conf.				Overall
Team	W		L	PCT	W		L	PCT
Rice	17	–	1	.944	29	–	6	.829
East Carolina	14	–	4	.778	22	–	10	.688
South Florida	13	–	5	.722	20	–	12	.625
Tulsa	11	–	7	.611	19	–	12	.613
North Texas	11	–	7	.611	19	–	14	.576
UTSA †	9	–	9	.500	18	–	16	.529
Temple	8	–	10	.444	15	–	17	.469
Charlotte	8	–	10	.444	14	–	18	.438
Florida Atlantic	7	–	11	.389	14	–	18	.438
Tulane	6	–	12	.333	11	–	20	.355
Wichita State	5	–	13	.278	8	–	23	.258
UAB	4	–	14	.222	11	–	19	.367
Memphis	4	–	14	.222	10	–	21	.323
† 2026 American tournament winner

The 2025–26 East Carolina Pirates women's basketball team represented East Carolina University during the 2025–26 NCAA Division I women's basketball season. The Pirates, led by seventh-year head coach Kim McNeill, played their home games at Williams Arena at Minges Coliseum in Greenville, North Carolina, as members of the American Conference.

== Previous season ==
The Pirates finished the 2024–25 season 17–15, 8–10 in AAC play to finish in 7th place. They defeated Memphis in the second round of the AAC tournament before losing in the quarterfinals to North Texas.

== Offseason ==
=== Departures ===
East Carolina Departures
Name	Num	Pos.	Height	Year	Hometown	Reason for Departure
Taliyah Wyche	00	F	6'3"	Senior	Fort Lauderdale, FL	Graduated
Journee McDaniel	1	G	5'9"	Junior	New Bern, NC	Transferred to UNC Asheville
Tatyana Wyche	2	F	6'2"	Senior	Fort Lauderdale, FL	Graduated
Timia Ware	3	G	5'6"	Senior	Chicago, IL	Graduated
Synia Johnson	4	G	5'9"	Graduate Student	Waldorf, MD	Graduated
Devin Hagemann	7	G	5'6"	Freshman	Detroit, MI	Transferred to DePaul
Khloe Miler	8	F	6'3"	Freshman	Raleigh, NC	Transferred to Temple
Khia Miller	11	G	5'10"	Sophomore	Woodbridge, VA	Transferred to Georgetown
Morgan Moseley	12	G/F	5'11"	Graduate Student	Centreville, MD	Graduated
Jade Tillman	20	G/F	5'10"	Sophomore	Rockville, MD	Transferred to UMBC
Amiya Joyner	23	F	6'2"	Junior	Farmville, NC	Transferred to LSU
Kimora Jenkins	24	G	6'1"	Senior	Long Island, NY	Graduated

=== Incoming transfers ===
East Carolina incoming transfers
Name	Num	Pos.	Height	Year	Hometown	Previous school
Savannah Brooks	2	G	5'9"	Senior	Taneytown, MD	Coastal Carolina
Taylor Barner	3	G	5'9"	Sophomore	Cary, NC	Memphis
Kennedy Fauntleroy	4	G	5'7"	Senior	Upper Marlboro, MD	Arizona State
Chimera Iloanya	23	F	6'0"	(redshirt) Senior	Tampa, FL	Portland State
Keanna Rembert	31	F	6'2"	(redshirt) Senior	Raleigh, NC	Charlotte

==== Recruiting ====
There was no recruiting class for the class of 2025.

== Roster ==
2025–26 East Carolina Pirates women's basketball team
Players
Coaches

Pos.	#	Name	Height	Year	Previous school	Hometown
G	1	Olivia Hilliard	5 ft 9 in (1.75 m)	Fr	S3 Academy	Fredericksburg, VA
G	2	Savannah Brooks	5 ft 9 in (1.75 m)	Sr	Coastal Carolina	Taneytown, MD
G	3	Taylor Barner	5 ft 9 in (1.75 m)	So	Memphis	Cary, NC
G	4	Kennedy Fauntleroy	5 ft 7 in (1.7 m)	Sr	Arizona State	Upper Marlboro, MD
G	5	Jayla Hearp	5 ft 9 in (1.75 m)	RS Jr	Smithfield High School	Hampton, VA
G	11	Amanda Smith	5 ft 8 in (1.73 m)	Fr	The Darrow School	Brooklyn, NY
G	14	Bobbi Smith	5 ft 11 in (1.8 m)	Sr	Southeast Raleigh High School	Garner, NC
F	19	Amaya Shaw	6 ft 2 in (1.88 m)	Fr	Winter Haven High School	Lakeland, FL
F	21	Mildred Dibua	6 ft 1 in (1.85 m)	Fr	Fort Erie International	Ontario, Canada
F	22	Anzhané Hutton	6 ft 0 in (1.83 m)	GS	UCF	Dallas, TX
F	23	Chimera Iloanya	6 ft 0 in (1.83 m)	RS Sr	Portland State	Tampa, FL
F	31	Keanna Rembert	6 ft 2 in (1.88 m)	RS Sr	Charlotte	Raleigh, NC
F	44	Zaniah Zellous	6 ft 2 in (1.88 m)	Fr	DME Academy	Charleston, WV

Head coach

- Kim McNeill (Richmond)

Assistant coach(es)

- Jason Harris (Fordham)
- Tamoria Holmes (Howard)
- Jeffrey Williams (Howard)

Legend

- (C) Team captain
- (S) Suspended
- (I) Ineligible
- (W) Walk-on
- Injured
- Current redshirt

Roster

== Schedule and results ==
Date time, TV	Rank^{#}	Opponent^{#}	Result	Record	High points	High rebounds	High assists	Site (attendance) city, state
Non-conference regular season
November 3, 2025*; 6:00 p.m., ESPN+		UNC Wilmington	W 82–63	1–0	16 – Fauntleroy	7 – Hutton	3 – Fauntleroy	Williams Arena (1,010); Greenville, NC
November 7, 2025*; 2:00 p.m., ESPN+		at Liberty	L 53–69	1–1	13 – Hutton	6 – Hutton	2 – Tied	Liberty Arena (1,050); Lynchburg, VA
November 11, 2025*; 6:00 p.m., ESPN+		Charleston Southern	W 91–62	2–1	32 – Barner	9 – Hutton	5 – Hillard	Williams Arena (890); Greenville, NC
November 16, 2025*; 2:00 p.m., ESPN+		at High Point	L 68–84	2–2	18 – Hutton	13 – Hutton	3 – Tied	Qubein Center (967); High Point, NC
November 21, 2025*; 11:00 a.m., ESPN+		Old Dominion	L 67–73	2–3	26 – Hutton	13 – Hutton	4 – Fauntleroy	Williams Arena (5,432); Greenville, NC
November 26, 2025*; 10:00 a.m., FloCollege		vs. UCF; Puerto Rico Shootout	L 61–75	2–4	14 – Brooks	7 – Hutton	4 – Fauntleroy	Coliseo Guillermo Angulo (250); San Juan, PR
November 27, 2025*; 10:00 a.m., FloCollege		vs. Illinois State; Puerto Rico Shootout	W 73–66	3–4	17 – Fauntleroy	6 – Rembert	8 – Fauntleroy	Coliseo Guillermo Angulo; San Juan, PR
November 28, 2025*; 12:30 p.m., FloCollege		vs. Hofstra; Puerto Rico Shootout	W 72–53	4–4	18 – Barner	5 – Rembert	3 – Tied	Coliseo Guillermo Angulo (250); San Juan, PR
December 3, 2025*; 6:00 p.m., ESPN+		James Madison	L 66–83	4–5	17 – Fauntleroy	6 – Hutton	4 – Fauntleroy	Williams Arena (820); Greenville, NC
December 7, 2025*; 2:00 p.m., ESPN+		Elon	W 64–53	5–5	21 – Barner	6 – Zellous	3 – Tied	Williams Arena (958); Greenville, NC
December 14, 2025*; 4:00 p.m., ESPN+		UNC Asheville	W 75–61	6–5	20 – Barner	8 – Brooks	5 – Fauntleroy	Williams Arena; Greenville, NC
December 17, 2025*; 11:00 a.m., ESPN+		Wofford	W 80–59	7–5	30 – Barner	5 – Hearp	4 – Fauntleroy	Williams Arena (4,681); Greenville, NC
December 21, 2025*; 1:00 p.m., ESPN+		Campbell	W 81−59	8−5	14 – Hutton	10 – Zellous	3 – Brooks	Williams Arena (710); Greenville, NC
American regular season
December 30, 2025; 6:00 p.m., ESPN+		UAB	W 88–87 ^{OT}	9–5 (1–0)	27 – Rembert	11 – Rembert	5 – Brooks	Williams Arena (760); Greenville, NC
January 3, 2026; 6:00 p.m., ESPN+		Memphis	W 74–65	10−5 (2−0)	16 – Tied	9 – Hearp	7 – Fauntleroy	Williams Arena (926); Greenville, NC
January 6, 2026; 7:30 p.m., ESPN+		at North Texas	L 63–87	10−6 (2−1)	16 – Hearp	7 – Zellous	4 – Fauntleroy	The Super Pit (1,179); Denton, TX
January 10, 2026; 3:00 p.m., ESPN+		at Wichita State	W 83–56	11–6 (3–1)	21 – Fauntleroy	7 – Tied	8 – Fauntleroy	Charles Koch Arena (872); Wichita, KS
January 13, 2026; 6:00 p.m., ESPN+		Tulsa	W 79–48	12–6 (4–1)	21 – Fauntleroy	8 – Tied	7 – Fauntleroy	Williams Arena (687); Greenville, NC
January 17, 2026; 2:00 p.m., ESPN+		Temple	W 81–65	13–6 (5–1)	27 – Fauntleroy	7 – Tied	8 – Fauntleroy	Williams Arena (1,027); Greenville, NC
January 20, 2026; 7:30 p.m., ESPN+		at UTSA	W 65–58	14–6 (6–1)	21 – Rembert	8 – Hutton	4 – Tied	Convocation Center (786); San Antonio, TX
January 24, 2026; 6:00 p.m., ESPN+		at UAB	W 87–61	15–6 (7–1)	21 – Hutton	7 – Hutton	8 – Fauntleroy	Bartow Arena (310); Birmingham, AL
January 27, 2026; 6:00 p.m., ESPN+		Wichita State	L 54–63	15–7 (7–2)	13 – Fauntleroy	6 – Zellous	7 – Fauntleroy	Williams Arena (674); Greenville, NC
January 30, 2026; 3:00 p.m., ESPN+		at Charlotte	W 67–61	16–7 (8–2)	21 – Fauntleroy	6 – Hutton	5 – Fauntleroy	Dale F. Halton Arena (544); Charlotte, NC
February 4, 2026; 6:00 p.m., ESPN+		South Florida	W 64–62	17–7 (9–2)	18 – Hearp	8 – Hutton	6 – Fauntleroy	Williams Arena (544); Greenville, NC
February 10, 2026; 7:30 p.m., ESPN+		at Tulane	W 65–61	18–7 (10–2)	23 – Fauntleroy	13 – Hutton	4 – Fauntleroy	Devlin Fieldhouse (638); New Orleans, LA
February 14, 2026; 2:00 p.m., ESPN+		at Temple	W 79–73	19–7 (11–2)	19 – Tied	8 – Brooks	3 – Tied	Liacouras Center (1,119); Philadelphia, PA
February 17, 2026; 6:00 p.m., ESPN+		Florida Atlantic	W 74–61	20–7 (12–2)	17 – Hutton	11 – Hutton	4 – Tied	Williams Arena (933); Greenville, NC
February 21, 2026; 2:00 p.m., ESPN+		Rice	L 58–60	20–8 (12–3)	18 – Hutton	14 – Hutton	8 – Fauntleroy	Williams Arena (1,882); Greenville, NC
February 25, 2026; 8:00 p.m., ESPN+		at Memphis	L 80–88 ^{2OT}	20–9 (12–4)	19 – Barner	13 – Hutton	9 – Fauntleroy	Elma Roane Fieldhouse (627); Memphis, TN
February 28, 2026; 6:00 p.m., ESPN+		Charlotte	W 64–57	21–9 (13–4)	14 – Hutton	6 – Zellous	6 – Fauntleroy	Williams Arena (1,010); Greenville, NC
March 7, 2026; 3:00 p.m., ESPN+		at Tulsa	W 76–61	22–9 (14–4)	17 – Fauntleroy	7 – Rembert	8 – Fauntleroy	Reynolds Center (1,324); Tulsa, OK
American tournament
March 13, 2026; 10:10 p.m., ESPN+	(2)	vs. (6) UTSA; Semifinals	L 44–54	22–10	12 – Fauntleroy	5 – Rembert	3 – Rembert	Legacy Arena; Birmingham, AL
*Non-conference game. ^{#}Rankings from AP Poll. (#) Tournament seedings in parentheses. All times are in Eastern.
