= 2025–26 Memphis Tigers women's basketball team =

American college basketball season

2025–26 Memphis Tigers women's basketball
- Conference: American Athletic Conference
- Record: 10–21 (4–14 American)
- Head coach: Alex Simmons (3rd season)
- Assistant coaches: Harlyn Wyatt; Vonn Read; Garner Small; Kevin Sullivan; Brea Elmore
- Home arena: Elma Roane Fieldhouse

2025–26 American Conference women's basketball standings
	Conf.				Overall
Team	W		L	PCT	W		L	PCT
Rice	17	–	1	.944	29	–	6	.829
East Carolina	14	–	4	.778	22	–	10	.688
South Florida	13	–	5	.722	20	–	12	.625
Tulsa	11	–	7	.611	19	–	12	.613
North Texas	11	–	7	.611	19	–	14	.576
UTSA †	9	–	9	.500	18	–	16	.529
Temple	8	–	10	.444	15	–	17	.469
Charlotte	8	–	10	.444	14	–	18	.438
Florida Atlantic	7	–	11	.389	14	–	18	.438
Tulane	6	–	12	.333	11	–	20	.355
Wichita State	5	–	13	.278	8	–	23	.258
UAB	4	–	14	.222	11	–	19	.367
Memphis	4	–	14	.222	10	–	21	.323
† 2026 American tournament winner

The 2025–26 Memphis Tigers women's basketball team represented the University of Memphis during the 2025–26 NCAA Division I women's basketball season. The Tigers, led by third-year head coach Alex Simmons, played their home games at the Elma Roane Fieldhouse in Memphis, Tennessee, as members of the American Conference.

== Previous season ==
The Tigers finished the 2024–25 season 7–23, 5–13 in AAC play, to finish in tenth place. They were defeated by East Carolina in the second round of the AAC tournament.

== Preseason ==
On October 9, 2025, the newly renamed American Conference released their preseason coaches poll. Memphis was picked to finish ninth in the conference.

=== Preseason rankings ===
American Preseason Poll
Place	Team	Votes
1	South Florida	143 (11)
2	UTSA	119 (1)
3	Rice	113 (1)
4	Temple	107
5	Tulane	104
6	North Texas	95
7	East Carolina	82
8	Tulsa	72
9	Memphis	52
10	Charlotte	50
11	UAB	38
12	Wichita State	23
13	Florida Atlantic	16
(#) first-place votes

=== Preseason All-American Conference Teams ===
No players were named to the Preseason All-American Conference First or Second Teams.

== Roster ==
2025–26 Memphis Tigers women's basketball team
Players
Coaches

Pos.	#	Name	Height	Year	Previous school	Hometown
G	1	Cori Allen	5 ft 10 in (1.78 m)	Jr	Illinois	Nashville, Tennessee
G	2	Jordan Hunter	5 ft 8 in (1.73 m)	So	Auburn	Birmingham, Alabama
G	5	Chaé Harris	5 ft 8 in (1.73 m)	Sr	Fordham	Snellville, Georgia
F	7	Paris Gaines	6 ft 3 in (1.91 m)	Jr	Georgia Southern	Orlando, Florida
F	10	Bailey Gilmore	6 ft 3 in (1.91 m)	RS So	Vanderbilt	Midway, Georgia
G	12	Daejah Richmond	5 ft 8 in (1.73 m)	Jr	UT Martin	Cordova, Tennessee
F	13	Brooklyn Alexander	6 ft 1 in (1.85 m)	So	Tulsa	Houston, Texas
G	22	Brooklynn Charlo	6 ft 0 in (1.83 m)	Fr	IMG Academy	Thornton, Colorado
F	23	Jah'Naesia Spiers	6 ft 1 in (1.85 m)	Fr	Southwest DeKalb High School	Atlanta, Georgia
F	24	Tamya Smith	6 ft 2 in (1.88 m)	So	Pleasant Grove High School	Birmingham, Alabama
F	32	Amauri Williams	6 ft 4 in (1.93 m)	Sr	Prairie View A&M	North Little Rock, Arkansas
G	33	Kennedi Alexander	6 ft 1 in (1.85 m)	So	Tulsa	Houston, Texas

Head coach

- Alex Simmons (Tennessee)

Assistant coach(es)

- Harlyn Wyatt (Tulane)
- Vonn Read (Clark Atlanta)
- Garner Small (Olivet)
- Kevin Sullivan (Louisville)
- Brea Elmore (Memphis)

Legend

- (C) Team captain
- (S) Suspended
- (I) Ineligible
- (W) Walk-on
- Injured
- Current redshirt

Roster
Last update: June 15, 2026

== Schedule and results ==
Date time, TV	Rank^{#}	Opponent^{#}	Result	Record	High points	High rebounds	High assists	Site (attendance) city, state
Exhibition
October 27, 2025*; 5:30 pm, ESPNU		vs. No. 19 Vanderbilt; Hoops for St. Jude® Tip Off Classic	L 68–104	–	12 – Smith	9 – B. Alexander	2 – Hunter	FedExForum; Memphis, TN
Non-conference regular season
November 3, 2025*; 11:00 am, ESPN+		Arkansas–Pine Bluff	L 64–69	0–1	19 – Harris	8 – Gaines	4 – Richmond	Elma Roane Fieldhouse (1,653); Memphis, TN
November 7, 2025*; 7:00 pm, ESPN+		at Little Rock	W 64–62	1–1	16 – Richmond	7 – K. Alexander	3 – Richmond	Jack Stephens Center (632); Little Rock, AR
November 11, 2025*; 7:00 pm, ESPN+		at South Alabama	W 76–68	2–1	24 – Smith	9 – K. Alexander	3 – Hunter	Mitchell Center (439); Mobile, AL
November 15, 2025*; 12:00 pm, ESPN+		Ball State	L 59–83	2–2	20 – Harris	6 – Tied	4 – Hunter	Elma Roane Fieldhouse (741); Memphis, TN
November 18, 2025*; 7:00 pm, ESPN+		No. 13 Ole Miss	L 64–73	2–3	24 – Harris	7 – Gaines	2 – Tied	Elma Roane Fieldhouse (1,217); Memphis, TN
November 22, 2025*; 2:00 pm, ESPN+		East Tennessee State	W 60−54	3−3	12 – Hunter	8 – Gaines	4 – Tied	Elma Roane Fieldhouse (659); Memphis, TN
November 25, 2025*; 7:00 pm, ESPN+		Louisiana	W 70−64	4−3	21 – Harris	12 – Gaines	5 – Allen	Elma Roane Fieldhouse (681); Memphis, TN
November 28, 2025*; 6:30 pm, FloCollege		vs. Florida; Cayman Islands Classic Cayman Brac Division	L 60–74	4–4	19 – Richmond	7 – K. Alexander	3 – Hunter	John Gray Gymnasium (1,050); George Town, CI
November 29, 2025*; 6:30 pm, FloCollege		vs. St. John's; Cayman Islands Classic Cayman Brac Division	L 73–84	4–5	13 – Harris	6 – Allen	5 – Harris	John Gray Gymnasium (313); George Town, CI
December 7, 2025*; 1:00 pm, ESPN+		at Middle Tennessee	L 51–60	4–6	14 – Hunter	4 – Smith	3 – Hunter	Murphy Center (3,637); Murfreesboro, TN
December 15, 2025*; 11:00 am, ESPN+		at Murray State	L 57–85	4–7	27 – Smith	8 – Smith	3 – Tied	CFSB Center (4,513); Murray, KY
December 20, 2025*; 1:00 pm, ESPN+		at Southeastern Louisiana	W 70–66	5–7	26 – Richmond	10 – Smith	4 – Allen	Pride Roofing University Center (321); Hammond, LA
December 28, 2025*; 2:00 pm, ESPN+		Rust	W 107−63	6−7	15 – Charlo	6 – Tied	5 – Tied	Elma Roane Fieldhouse (924); Memphis, TN
American regular season
December 31, 2025; 2:00 pm, ESPN+		at Charlotte	L 49–62	6–8 (0–1)	10 – Harris	7 – Smith	3 – Richmond	Dale F. Halton Arena (617); Charlotte, NC
January 3, 2026; 1:00 pm, ESPN+		at East Carolina	L 65–74	6–9 (0–2)	11 – Smith	7 – Richmond	4 – Gaines	Williams Arena (926); Greenville, NC
January 7, 2026; 7:00 pm, ESPN+		Florida Atlantic	W 74–66	7–9 (1–2)	23 – Richmond	11 – Richmond	5 – Allen	Elma Roane Fieldhouse (1,086); Memphis, TN
January 10, 2026; 2:00 pm, ESPN+		South Florida	L 81–90	7–10 (1–3)	24 – Richmond	8 – Gaines	6 – Richmond	Elma Roane Fieldhouse (1,381); Memphis, TN
January 13, 2026; 6:30 pm, ESPN+		at North Texas	L 64–75	7–11 (1–4)	21 – Smith	7 – K. Alexander	5 – Richmond	The Super Pit (1,371); Denton, TX
January 20, 2026; 6:00 pm, ESPN+		at Wichita State	L 59–66	7–12 (1–5)	11 – Tied	8 – Smith	7 – Richmond	Charles Koch Arena (894); Wichita, KS
January 23, 2026; 4:00 pm, ESPN+		UTSA	W 52–40	8–12 (2–5)	10 – Williams	11 – Richmond	5 – Richmond	Elma Roane Fieldhouse (827); Memphis, TN
January 31, 2026; 2:00 pm, ESPN+		at Tulsa	L 69–74 ^{2OT}	8–13 (2–6)	13 – Tied	8 – Allen	4 – Richmond	Reynolds Center (1,336); Tulsa, OK
February 7, 2026; 1:00 pm, ESPN+		Rice	L 65–82	8–14 (2–7)	15 – Richmond	9 – Richmond	6 – Richmond	Elma Roane Fieldhouse (1,204); Memphis, TN
February 10, 2026; 6:00 pm, ESPN+		at UAB	L 56–58	8–15 (2–8)	15 – Smith	7 – Smith	5 – Allen	Bartow Arena (634); Birmingham, AL
February 14, 2026; 2:00 pm, ESPN+		Charlotte	L 58–61	8–16 (2–9)	21 – Richmond	12 – Gaines	3 – Hunter	Elma Roane Fieldhouse (1,111); Memphis, TN
February 17, 2026; 7:00 pm, ESPN+		Tulane	L 58–63	8–17 (2–10)	23 – Richmond	5 – Richmond	3 – Richmond	Elma Roane Fieldhouse (554); Memphis, TN
February 19, 2026; 6:30 pm, ESPN+		at Tulane	L 54–69	8–18 (2–11)	20 – Smith	10 – Gaines	5 – Allen	Devlin Fieldhouse (751); New Orleans, LA
February 22, 2026; 12:00 pm, ESPN+		at Temple	L 62–65	8–19 (2–12)	21 – Richmond	7 – Richmond	6 – Richmond	Liacouras Center (1,075); Philadelphia, PA
February 25, 2026; 7:00 pm, ESPN+		East Carolina	W 88–80 ^{2OT}	9–19 (3–12)	26 – Smith	13 – K. Alexander	7 – Allen	Elma Roane Fieldhouse (627); Memphis, TN
March 1, 2026; 3:00 pm, ESPN+		at UTSA	L 55–67	9–20 (3–13)	17 – Richmond	7 – Tied	4 – Tied	Convocation Center (1,023); San Antonio, TX
March 4, 2026; 7:00 pm, ESPN+		UAB	L 76–79 ^{OT}	9–21 (3–14)	23 – Richmond	11 – Smith	5 – Tied	Elma Roane Fieldhouse (881); Memphis, TN
March 7, 2026; 2:00 pm, ESPN+		Wichita State	W 65–61	10–21 (4–14)	21 – Smith	8 – Smith	5 – Richmond	Elma Roane Fieldhouse (704); Memphis, TN
*Non-conference game. ^{#}Rankings from AP Poll. (#) Tournament seedings in parentheses. All times are in Central.
