= 2025–26 UTSA Roadrunners women's basketball team =

American college basketball season

2025–26 UTSA Roadrunners women's basketball

AAC tournament champions

NCAA tournament, First Round
- Conference: American Conference
- Record: 18–16 (9–9 American)
- Head coach: Karen Aston (5th season)
- Associate head coach: Cameron Miles
- Assistant coaches: Amber Gregg; Chantel Govan; Sophia Ramos; Angel Almaguer
- Home arena: Convocation Center

2025–26 American Conference women's basketball standings
	Conf.				Overall
Team	W		L	PCT	W		L	PCT
Rice	17	–	1	.944	29	–	6	.829
East Carolina	14	–	4	.778	22	–	10	.688
South Florida	13	–	5	.722	20	–	12	.625
Tulsa	11	–	7	.611	19	–	12	.613
North Texas	11	–	7	.611	19	–	14	.576
UTSA †	9	–	9	.500	18	–	16	.529
Temple	8	–	10	.444	15	–	17	.469
Charlotte	8	–	10	.444	14	–	18	.438
Florida Atlantic	7	–	11	.389	14	–	18	.438
Tulane	6	–	12	.333	11	–	20	.355
Wichita State	5	–	13	.278	8	–	23	.258
UAB	4	–	14	.222	11	–	19	.367
Memphis	4	–	14	.222	10	–	21	.323
† 2026 American tournament winner

The 2025–26 UTSA Roadrunners women's basketball team represented the University of Texas at San Antonio during the 2025–26 NCAA Division I women's basketball season. The Roadrunners, led by fifth-year head coach Karen Aston, played their home games at the Convocation Center in San Antonio, Texas, as second-year members of the American Athletic Conference.

UTSA won the American Conference tournament, defeating Rice in the final, 54–40.

== Previous season ==
The Roadrunners finished the 2024–25 season 26–5 and 17–1 in AAC play, becoming the conference regular season champions. As the No. 1 seed in the AAC tournament, they lost in the quarterfinals in a four-point upset to No. 9 seeded Rice.

As conference regular season champions who did not win their conference title and were not selected for the NCAA tournament, they earned an automatic bid to the WBIT for the first time, where they lost in the first round to Gonzaga.

== Offseason ==
=== Departures ===
UTSA departures
Name	Num	Pos.	Height	Year	Hometown	Reason for departure
Alexis Parker	2	G	5'9"	Junior	San Antonio, TX	Transferred to Lamar
Emma Lucio	3	G	5'9"	Sophomore	Edinburg, TX	Transferred to Southeastern Louisiana
Nina De Leon Nigron	8	G	5'6"	Graduate student	San Juan, PR	Graduated
Sidney Love	11	G	5'8"	Junior	Cibolo, TX	Transferred to Texas Tech
Aysia Proctor	12	G	5'8"	Sophomore	Schertz, TX	Transferred to North Texas
Jordyn Jenkins	32	F	6'0"	RS senior	Renton, WA	Graduated

=== Incoming transfers ===
UTSA incoming transfers
Name	Num	Pos.	Height	Year	Hometown	Previous school
Ereauna Hardaway	2	G	5'8"	Senior	Jonesboro, AR	North Texas
Saher Alizada	3	G	5'10"	Junior	Montreal, Canada	South Plains College (NJCAA)
Jayla Holiman	11	G	5'6"	Junior	McAlester, OK	UT Rio Grande Valley
Marie Han	14	G	5'3"	Sophomore	Austin, TX	Fort Scott CC (NJCAA)

=== Recruiting class ===
There was no recruiting class for the class of 2025.

== Roster ==
2025–26 UTSA Roadrunners women's basketball team
Players
Coaches

Pos.	#	Name	Height	Year	Previous school	Hometown
F	0	Sema Udo	6 ft 0 in (1.83 m)	Fr	Plano East Senior High School	Plano, TX
G	1	Siena Guttadauro	5 ft 6 in (1.68 m)	RS Jr	Archbishop Mitty High School	San Jose, CA
G	2	Ereauna Hardaway	5 ft 8 in (1.73 m)	Sr	Jonesboro High School; North Texas	Jonesboro, AR
G	3	Saher Alizada	5 ft 10 in (1.78 m)	Jr	École Secondaire Saint-Laurent; South Plains College	Montreal, Quebec
G	4	Damara Allen	5 ft 10 in (1.78 m)	So	Cherokee Trail High School	Aurora, CO
G	5	Mia Hammonds	6 ft 3 in (1.91 m)	So	Steele High School	Cibolo, TX
F	7	Nyayongah Gony	6 ft 4 in (1.93 m)	RS Sr	Lincoln High School; Mississippi State	Lincoln, NB
F	10	Sanaa Bean	6 ft 3 in (1.91 m)	Fr	Edna Karr High School	New Orleans, LA
G	11	Jayla Holiman	5 ft 6 in (1.68 m)	Jr	McAlester High School; UT Rio Grande Valley	McAlester, OK
F	13	Taylor Ross	6 ft 1 in (1.85 m)	So	Brennan High School	San Antonio, TX
G	14	Marie Han	5 ft 3 in (1.6 m)	So	Vista Ridge High School; Fort Scott CC	Austin, TX
G	16	Adriana Robles	5 ft 5 in (1.65 m)	Fr	Fossil Ridge High School	Arecibo, PR
F	20	Maya Linton	5 ft 11 in (1.8 m)	Sr	Duncanville High School	Duncanville, TX
F	21	Cheyenne Rowe	6 ft 2 in (1.88 m)	Sr	James Madison	Ajax, Ontario
F	25	Idara Udo	6 ft 1 in (1.85 m)	Jr	Plano East High School	Plano, TX
F/C	33	Emilia Dannebauer	6 ft 4 in (1.93 m)	So	Sportgymnasium Chemnit	Berlin, Germany

Head coach

- Karen Aston (Little Rock)

Assistant coach(es)

- Cameron Miles (San Diego)
- Amber Gregg (Texas–San Antonio)
- Chantel Govan (Texas–San Antonio)
- Sophia Ramos (San Diego State)
- Angel Almaguer (Texas–San Antonio)

Legend

- (C) Team captain
- (S) Suspended
- (I) Ineligible
- (W) Walk-on
- Injured
- Current redshirt

Roster

== Schedule and results ==
Date time, TV	Rank^{#}	Opponent^{#}	Result	Record	High points	High rebounds	High assists	Site (attendance) city, state
Non-conference regular season
November 6, 2025*; 6:00 p.m., ESPN+		at Texas Tech	L 52–79	0–1	13 – I. Udo	10 – I. Udo	2 – Allen	United Supermarkets Arena (3,315); Lubbock, TX
November 8, 2025*; 7:00 p.m., ESPN+		at Houston	L 48–52	0–2	13 – I. Udo	11 – Rowe	4 – Robles	Fertitta Center (1,161); Houston, TX
November 13, 2025*; 6:30 p.m., ESPN+		Texas State	W 64–41	1–2	16 – Tied	9 – I. Udo	4 – Tied	Convocation Center (1,221); San Antonio, TX
November 19, 2025*; 7:00 p.m., ESPN+		at Incarnate Word	W 74–57	2–2	17 – Rowe	13 – I. Udo	3 – Tied	McDermott Center (1,138); San Antonio, TX
November 24, 2025*; 2:00 p.m., FloSports		vs. Auburn; Hoopfest Women's Basketball Challenge	L 42–59	2–3	14 – Holiman	7 – Rowe	3 – Robles	Comerica Center (259); Frisco, TX
November 26, 2025*; 4:00 p.m., FloSports		vs. Grand Canyon; Hoopfest Women's Basketball Challenge	W 65–64	3–3	20 – Rowe	8 – Holiman	4 – Hardaway	Comerica Center (184); Frisco, TX
December 3, 2025*; 2:00 p.m., ESPN+		UNLV	L 39–66	3–4	9 – Rowe	8 – Rowe	3 – Hardaway	Convocation Center (856); San Antonio, TX
December 7, 2025*; 2:00 p.m., ESPN+		at No. 14 Baylor	L 55–73	3–5	15 – Hardaway	8 – Rowe	5 – Hardaway	Foster Pavilion (3,242); Waco, TX
December 13, 2025*; 1:00 p.m., ESPN+		Prairie View A&M	W 86–40	4–5	17 – Hammonds	14 – Rowe	7 – Hardaway	Convocation Center (721); San Antonio, TX
December 15, 2025*; 11:00 a.m., ESPN+		Texas A&M–Kingsville	W 82–40	5–5	15 – Hardaway	7 – Rowe	8 – Hardaway	Convocation Center (850); San Antonio, TX
December 20, 2025*; 12:00 p.m., ESPN+		at Columbia	L 65–70	5–6	17 – Hardaway	6 – Hardaway	7 – Hardaway	Levien Gymnasium (722); New York, NY
American regular season
December 30, 2025; 2:00 p.m., ESPN+		Tulane	W 65–63	6–6 (1–0)	16 – Hardaway	12 – Rowe	7 – Hardaway	Convocaton Center (685); San Antonio, TX
January 3, 2026; 1:30 p.m., ESPN+		at Temple	W 50–47	7–6 (2–0)	14 – Rowe	18 – Rowe	4 – Allen	Liacouras Center (4,038); Philadelphia, PA
January 10, 2026; 12:00 p.m., ESPN+		Charlotte	W 69–63	8–6 (3–0)	19 – Hardaway	6 – Tied	7 – Hardaway	Convocation Center (1,093); San Antonio, TX
January 13, 2026; 6:00 p.m., ESPN+		at South Florida	L 53–70	8–7 (3–1)	13 – Tied	10 – Tied	8 – Hardaway	Yuengling Center (1,896); Tampa, FL
January 16, 2026; 6:00 p.m., ESPN+		at Florida Atlantic	W 79–42	9–7 (4–1)	20 – Hardaway	8 – Rowe	5 – Allen	Eleanor R. Baldwin Arena (498); Boca Raton, FL
January 20, 2026; 6:30 p.m., ESPN+		East Carolina	L 58–65	9–8 (4–2)	12 – Tied	6 – Hammonds	7 – Hardaway	Convocation Center (786); San Antonio, TX
January 23, 2026; 2:00 p.m., ESPN+		at Memphis	L 40–52	9–9 (4–3)	15 – Hardaway	9 – Rowe	7 – Hardaway	Elma Roane Fieldhouse (827); Memphis, TN
January 28, 2026; 3:00 p.m., ESPN+		North Texas	W 66–64	10–9 (5–3)	27 – Rowe	11 – Rowe	5 – Tied	Convocation Center (639); San Antonio, TX
January 31, 2026; 1:00 p.m., ESPN+		Rice	L 55–65	10–10 (5–4)	11 – Allen	8 – Rowe	3 – Allen	Convocation Center (1,172); San Antonio, TX
February 3, 2026; 6:00 p.m., ESPN+		at UAB	L 69–81	10–11 (5–5)	17 – Hardaway	7 – Rowe	5 – Hardaway	Bartow Arena (407); Birmingham, AL
February 7, 2026; 2:00 p.m., ESPN+		at Tulsa	W 66–47	11–11 (6–5)	18 – I. Udo	9 – Rowe	7 – Hardaway	Reynolds Center (1,364); Tulsa, OK
February 10, 2026; 6:30 p.m., ESPN+		Temple	W 52–43	12–11 (7–5)	26 – Rowe	11 – Tied	6 – Hardaway	Convocation Center (942); San Antonio, TX
February 14, 2026; 6:30 p.m., ESPN+		South Florida	L 63–69	12–12 (7–6)	17 – Hardaway	12 – I. Udo	8 – Hardaway	Convocation Center (694); San Antonio, TX
February 21, 2026; 1:00 p.m., ESPN+		at Wichita State	L 61–62	12–13 (7–7)	23 – Rowe	10 – I. Udo	6 – Hardaway	Charles Koch Arena (845); Wichita, KS
February 24, 2026; 6:30 p.m., ESPN+		at North Texas	L 63–87	12–14 (7–8)	19 – Hardaway	9 – I. Udo	3 – Tied	The Super Pit (1,810); Denton, TX
March 1, 2026; 3:00 p.m., ESPNU		Memphis	W 67–55	13–14 (8–8)	18 – I. Udo	9 – Rowe	5 – Robles	Convocation Center (1,023); San Antonio, TX
March 4, 2026; 6:30 p.m., ESPN+		Tulsa	L 41–53	13–15 (8–9)	11 – Hardaway	9 – Tied	2 – Tied	Convocation Center (1,173); San Antonio, TX
March 7, 2026; 1:00 p.m., ESPN+		Rice	W 61–52	14–15 (9–9)	14 – Hammonds	12 – Rowe	5 – Hardaway	Tudor Fieldhouse (1,346); Houston, TX
American tournament
March 11, 2026; 2:00 p.m., ESPN+	(6)	vs. (7) Temple; Second Round	W 59–51	15−15	17 – Hardaway	12 – I. Udo	2 – Tied	Legacy Arena (363); Birmingham, AL
March 12, 2026; 2:00 p.m., ESPN+	(6)	vs. (3) South Florida; Quarterfinals	W 62–51	16–15	25 – Rowe	11 – Rowe	3 – Tied	Legacy Arena; Birmingham, AL
March 13, 2026; 8:00 p.m., ESPN+	(6)	vs. (2) East Carolina; Semifinals	W 54–44	17–15	15 – Hardaway	10 – Allen	4 – Hardaway	Legacy Arena; Birmingham, AL
March 14, 2026; 8:30 p.m., ESPN+	(6)	vs. (1) Rice; Championship	W 54–40	18–15	13 – Tied	8 – Rowe	4 – Hardaway	Legacy Arena; Birmingham, AL
NCAA tournament
March 21, 2026; 2:00 p.m., ABC	(16 FW1)	at (1 FW1) No. 1 UConn; First Round	L 52–90	18–16	11 – Tied	8 – Rowe	4 – Hardaway	Harry A. Gampel Pavilion (10,244); Storrs, CT
*Non-conference game. ^{#}Rankings from AP Poll. (#) Tournament seedings in parentheses. All times are in Central.
