= 2026 American Conference women's basketball tournament =

- Classification: Division I
- Season: 2025–26
- Teams: 10
- Site: Legacy Arena; Birmingham, Alabama
- Champions: UTSA (1st title)
- Winning coach: Karen Aston (1st title)
- MVP: Cheyenne Rowe (UTSA)
- Television: ESPN+, ESPNU

2025–26 American Conference women's basketball standings
	Conf.				Overall
Team	W		L	PCT	W		L	PCT
Rice	17	–	1	.944	29	–	6	.829
East Carolina	14	–	4	.778	22	–	10	.688
South Florida	13	–	5	.722	20	–	12	.625
Tulsa	11	–	7	.611	19	–	12	.613
North Texas	11	–	7	.611	19	–	14	.576
UTSA †	9	–	9	.500	18	–	16	.529
Temple	8	–	10	.444	15	–	17	.469
Charlotte	8	–	10	.444	14	–	18	.438
Florida Atlantic	7	–	11	.389	14	–	18	.438
Tulane	6	–	12	.333	11	–	20	.355
Wichita State	5	–	13	.278	8	–	23	.258
UAB	4	–	14	.222	11	–	19	.367
Memphis	4	–	14	.222	10	–	21	.323
† 2026 American tournament winner

The 2026 American Conference women's basketball tournament was the postseason women's basketball tournament for the American Conference for the 2025–26 season. It was held from March 10-14, 2026, at Legacy Arena in Birmingham, Alabama for the first time in history. UTSA received the conference's automatic bid to the 2026 NCAA tournament.

This was the first conference tournament under the American Conference name. In July 2025, the conference dropped the word "Athletic" from its name, as a result renaming itself the American Conference.

No. 6 seed UTSA defeated regular season champion Rice 54–40 in the championship game, earning them their first conference title in program history and sending them to the NCAA tournament for the first time since 2009. They beat No. 3 seed South Florida and No. 2 seed East Carolina on the way to the title, becoming the first team to beat all of the top 3 teams in tournament history.

== Seeds ==
Only the top ten conference teams qualify to participate in the tournament. Teams will be seeded by conference record. The conference adopted a stepladder format for the tournament, with the top two seeds receiving byes to the semifinals, the third and fourth seeds to the quarterfinals, and so on.

Tiebreakers may be applied as needed to properly seed the teams.

Seed	School	AC Record	Tiebreaker
1	Rice #‡	17–1	
2	East Carolina ‡	14–4	
3	South Florida †	13–5	
4	Tulsa †	11–7	1–0 vs. North Texas
5	North Texas	11–7	0–1 vs. Tulsa
6	UTSA	9–9	
7	Temple	8–10	2–0 vs. Charlotte
8	Charlotte	8–10	0–2 vs. Temple
9	Florida Atlantic	7–11	
10	Tulane	6–12	
DNQ	Wichita State	5–13	
DNQ	UAB	4–14	2–0 vs. Memphis
DNQ	Memphis	4–14	0–2 vs. UAB
# – American regular season champions, and tournament No. 1 seed. ‡ – Received a bye to the semifinals in the conference tournament. † – Received a bye to the quarterfinals in the conference tournament.

== Schedule ==
Game	Time	Matchup	Score	Television
First round – Tuesday, March 10
1	12:00 p.m.	No. 8 Charlotte vs. No. 9 Florida Atlantic	70–74^{OT}	ESPN+
2	2:00 p.m.	No. 7 Temple vs No. 10 Tulane	86–77^{OT}	ESPN+
Second round – Wednesday, March 11
3	12:00 p.m.	No. 5 North Texas vs No. 9 Florida Atlantic	80–57	ESPN+
4	2:00 p.m.	No. 6 UTSA vs. No. 7 Temple	59–51	ESPN+
Quarterfinals – Thursday, March 12
5	12:00 p.m.	No. 4 Tulsa vs. No. 5 North Texas	73–76	ESPN+
6	2:00 pm	No. 3 South Florida vs. No. 6 UTSA	51–62	ESPN+
Semifinals – Friday, March 13
7	6:00 p.m.	No. 1 Rice vs. No. 5 North Texas	71–67	ESPN+
8	8:00 p.m.	No. 2 East Carolina vs. No. 6 UTSA	44–54	ESPN+
Championship – Saturday, March 14
9	8:30 p.m.	No. 1 Rice vs. No. 6 UTSA	40–54	ESPNU
*Game times in CT. ()-Rankings denote tournament seeding.

== Bracket ==
First round Tuesday, March 10
8	Charlotte	70
9	Florida Atlantic	74*
7	Temple	86*
10	Tulane	77

Second round Wednesday, March 11
5	North Texas	80
9	Florida Atlantic	57
6	UTSA	60
7	Temple	51

Quarterfinals; Thursday, March 12
4	Tulsa	73
5	North Texas	76
3	South Florida	51
6	UTSA	62

Semifinals; Friday, March 13
1	Rice	71
5	North Texas	67
2	East Carolina	44
6	UTSA	54

Championship; Saturday, March 14
1	Rice	40
6	UTSA	54

* denotes overtime period

== See also ==
- 2026 American Conference men's basketball tournament
