= 2025–26 Florida Atlantic Owls women's basketball team =

American college basketball season

2025–26 Florida Atlantic Owls women's basketball
- Conference: American Conference
- Record: 14–18 (7–11 American)
- Head coach: LeAnn Freeland (1st season)
- Associate head coach: Brooklyn Kohlheim
- Assistant coaches: Manisha Redus; McKenah Peters; Alison Hughes
- Home arena: Eleanor R. Baldwin Arena

2025–26 American Conference women's basketball standings
	Conf.				Overall
Team	W		L	PCT	W		L	PCT
Rice	17	–	1	.944	29	–	6	.829
East Carolina	14	–	4	.778	22	–	10	.688
South Florida	13	–	5	.722	20	–	12	.625
Tulsa	11	–	7	.611	19	–	12	.613
North Texas	11	–	7	.611	19	–	14	.576
UTSA †	9	–	9	.500	18	–	16	.529
Temple	8	–	10	.444	15	–	17	.469
Charlotte	8	–	10	.444	14	–	18	.438
Florida Atlantic	7	–	11	.389	14	–	18	.438
Tulane	6	–	12	.333	11	–	20	.355
Wichita State	5	–	13	.278	8	–	23	.258
UAB	4	–	14	.222	11	–	19	.367
Memphis	4	–	14	.222	10	–	21	.323
† 2026 American tournament winner

The 2025–26 Florida Atlantic Owls women's basketball team represented Florida Atlantic University during the 2025–26 NCAA Division I women's basketball season. The Owls, led by first-year head coach LeAnn Freeland, played their home games at Eleanor R. Baldwin Arena in Boca Raton, Florida as third-year members of the American Athletic Conference.

== Previous season ==
The Owls finished the 2024–25 season 11–21, 3–15 in AAC play to finish in last place. They lost in the first round of the AAC tournament to Charlotte.

Sullivan left FAU on March 25, 2025, after 4 seasons for an assistant coaching position at Missouri. Freeland, the longtime head coach at Division II Nova Southeastern, was hired by the Owls on April 1.

== Offseason ==
=== Departures ===
Florida Atlantic Departures
Name	Num	Pos.	Height	Year	Hometown	Reason for Departure
Mya Perry	1	G	5'11"	Junior	Reynoldsburg, OH	Transferred to Cincinnati
Kristina Godfrey	3	G	5'10"	Sophomore	Miami, FL	TBD; not listed on roster
Stefanie Ingram	8	G	5'8"	(redshirt) Sophomore	Orlando, FL	Transferred to South Florida
Alana Rouser	12	F	6'0"	Freshman	Madison, MS	Transferred to Charlotte
Evie Van Der Woude	13	C	6'5"	Sophomore	Zwolle, Netherlands	Transferred to Canisius
Lovisa Asbrink Hose	16	C	6'6"	Freshman	Stockholm, Sweden	Transferred to Texas
Maria Myklebust	21	F	6'1"	Senior	Asker, Norway	Graduated
Jada Moore	23	G	5'11"	Graduate Student	Denver, CO	Graduated
Sydney Mains	24	G	5'10"	Freshman	Knoxville, TN	Transferred to Missouri
Emaya Lewis	33	F	6'3"	Freshman	Loganville, GA	Transferred to Kennesaw State

=== Incoming transfers ===
Florida Atlantic Incoming Transfers
Name	Num	Pos.	Height	Year	Hometown	Previous School
Destyne Jackson	0	G	5'7"	Graduate Student	Lexington, KY	Memphis
Grace Carstensen	2	G	5'11"	Junior	Hinsdale, IL	DePaul
Jess Moors	3	F	6'0"	(redshirt) Senior	Auckland, New Zealand	Nova Southeastern
Michiyah Simmons	4	G	5'6"	Senior	Pompano Beach, FL	South Alabama
Ineivi Plata	5	G	5'3"	Sophomore	White Plains, NY	Saint Francis (PA)
Haley Walker	10	G	5'8"	(redshirt) Junior	Burlington, VT	DePaul
Madi Gewirtz	21	G	5'11"	Sophomore	Gilbert, AZ	New Mexico State
Vivian Onugha	22	F	6'2"	Junior	Lagos, Nigeria	Barton (NJCAA)

=== Recruiting ===
There was no recruiting class for the class of 2025.

==== 2026 recruiting class ====
College recruiting information (2026)
Name	Hometown	School	Height	Weight	Commit date
Jaelynn Housey; PG	Davie, FL	Nova High School	5 ft 10 in (1.78 m)	N/A	
Jaelynn Housey; PG	Recruit ratings: ESPN: (91)				
Overall recruit ranking:
Note: In many cases, Scout, Rivals, 247Sports, On3, and ESPN may conflict in their listings of height and weight.; In these cases, the average was taken. ESPN grades are on a 100-point scale.; Sources: "2026 Player Commits". ESPN. Archived from the original on October 3, 2025.; "2026 Team Ranking". Rivals.

== Roster ==
2025–26 Florida Atlantic Owls women's basketball team
Players
Coaches

Pos.	#	Name	Height	Year	Previous school	Hometown
G	0	Destyne Jackson	5 ft 7 in (1.7 m)	GS	Frederick Douglass High School; Memphis	Lexington, KY
G	2	Grace Carstensen	5 ft 11 in (1.8 m)	Jr	Nazareth Academy; DePaul	Hinsdale, IL
F	3	Jess Moors	6 ft 0 in (1.83 m)	RS Sr	Westlake Girls High School; Nova Southeastern	Auckland, New Zealand
G	4	Michiyah Simmons	5 ft 6 in (1.68 m)	Sr	Blanche Ely High School; South Alabama	Pompano Beach, FL
G	5	Ineivi Plata	5 ft 3 in (1.6 m)	So	White Plains High School; Saint Francis (PA)	White Plains, NY
G	6	Erin Rodgers	6 ft 0 in (1.83 m)	Fr	Grayson High School	Lawrenceville, GA
G	10	Haley Walker	5 ft 8 in (1.73 m)	RS Jr	Rice Memorial High School; DePaul	Burlington, VT
G	11	Ta'Ziah Jenks	6 ft 0 in (1.83 m)	GS	Mercy Academy; Cincinnati	Louisville, KY
G	21	Madi Gewirtz	5 ft 11 in (1.8 m)	So	Highland High School; New Mexico State	Gilbert, AZ
F	22	Vivian Onugha	6 ft 2 in (1.88 m)	Jr	Topfield College; Barton	Lagos, Nigeria
G	31	Zahira Arizmendi	5 ft 8 in (1.73 m)	Jr	Middle Tennessee	Madrid, Spain

Head coach

- LeAnn Freeland (Southern Indiana)

Assistant coach(es)

- Brooklyn Kohlheim (Florida Southern)
- Manisha Redus (Alabama)
- McKenah Peters (Nova Southeastern)
- Alison Hughes (Nova Southeastern)

Legend

- (C) Team captain
- (S) Suspended
- (I) Ineligible
- (W) Walk-on
- Injured
- Current redshirt

Roster

== Schedule and results ==
Date time, TV	Rank^{#}	Opponent^{#}	Result	Record	High points	High rebounds	High assists	Site (attendance) city, state
Non-conference regular season
November 4, 2025*; 7:00 p.m., ESPN+		Florida Memorial	W 89–46	1–0	24 – Onugha	14 – Walker	5 – Tied	Eleanor R. Baldwin Arena (480); Boca Raton, FL
November 8, 2025*; 7:00 p.m., ESPN+		at Kennesaw State	W 69–68	2–0	13 – Jackson	4 – Onugha	5 – Simmons	Convocation Center (567); Kennesaw, GA
November 13, 2025*; 7:00 p.m., ACCNX/ESPN+		at Miami (FL)	L 47–79	2–1	14 – Carstensen	4 – Tied	3 – Tied	Watsco Center (791); Coral Gables, FL
November 20, 2025*; 8:00 p.m., ESPN+		at South Alabama	L 63–70	2–2	17 – Onugha	6 – Walker	3 – Jackson	Mitchell Center (379); Mobile, AL
November 24, 2025*; 7:00 p.m., ESPN+		Florida	L 51–59	2–3	10 – Jackson	10 – Onugha	4 – Moors	Eleanor R. Baldwin Arena (831); Boca Raton, FL
November 27, 2025*; 12:00 p.m., ESPN+		Air Force; FAU Thanksgiving Classic	W 76–71	3–3	15 – Moors	7 – Onugha	3 – Moors	Eleanor R. Baldwin Arena (457); Boca Raton, FL
November 28, 2025*; 1:00 p.m., ESPN+		Wright State	W 66–65 ^{OT}	4–3	12 – Tied	11 – Walker	3 – Moors	Eleanor R. Baldwin Arena (731); Boca Raton, FL
December 3, 2025*; 7:30 p.m., ESPN+		at Western Kentucky	W 47–44	5–3	14 – Arizmendi	9 – Walker	6 – Moors	E. A. Diddle Arena (670); Bowling Green, KY
December 12, 2025*; 11:00 a.m., ESPN+		Florida Gulf Coast	L 59–70	5–4	9 – Tied	9 – Walker	4 – Arizmendi	Eleanor R. Baldwin Arena (1,274); Boca Raton, FL
December 15, 2025*; 7:00 p.m., ESPN+		FIU	L 63–80	5–5	18 – Onugha	6 – Moors	4 – Simmons	Eleanor R. Baldwin Arena (912); Boca Raton, FL
December 19, 2025*; 1:00 p.m., ESPN+		vs. UMass; FIU Christmas Tournament	W 66–50	5–6	13 – Jackson	9 – Moors	5 – Simmons	Ocean Bank Convocation Center (165); Miami, FL
December 20, 2025*; 11:00 a.m., ESPN+		at FIU; FIU Christmas Tournament	W 60–57	6–6	19 – Walker	9 – Walker	3 – Walker	Ocean Bank Convocation Center (128); Miami, FL
American regular season
December 30, 2025; 7:00 p.m., ESPN+		North Texas	L 56–81	6–7 (0–1)	14 – Onugha	8 – Walker	5 – Moors	Eleanor R. Baldwin Arena (603); Boca Raton, FL
January 3, 2026; 2:00 p.m., ESPN+		Rice	L 75–83	6–8 (0–2)	22 – Gewirtz	10 – Walker	7 – Moors	Eleanor R. Baldwin Arena (520); Boca Raton, FL
January 7, 2026; 2:00 p.m., ESPN+		at Memphis	L 66–74	6–9 (0–3)	17 – Rodgers	9 – Onugha	4 – Tied	Elma Roane Fieldhouse (1,086); Memphis, TN
January 10, 2026; 3:00 p.m., ESPN+		at UAB	W 70–63	7−9 (1−3)	15 – Onugha	9 – Gewirtz	4 – Moors	Bartow Arena (287); Birmingham, AL
January 13, 2026; 7:00 p.m., ESPN+		Wichita State	W 88−64	8−9 (2−3)	17 – Simmons	10 – Onugha	4 – Tied	Eleanor R. Baldwin Arena (445); Boca Raton, FL
January 16, 2026; 7:00 p.m., ESPN+		UTSA	L 42–79	8–10 (2–4)	14 – Onugha	12 – Onugha	2 – Arizmendi	Eleanor R. Baldwin Arena (498); Boca Raton, FL
January 20, 2026; 6:30 p.m., ESPN+		at Charlotte	L 56–77	8–11 (2–5)	16 – Simmons	6 – Onugha	3 – Simmons	Dale F. Halton Arena (604); Charlotte, NC
January 24, 2026; 2:00 p.m., ESPN+		South Florida	W 64–63	9–11 (3–5)	21 – Moors	10 – Walker	5 – Plata	Eleanor R. Baldwin Arena (952); Boca Raton, FL
January 27, 2026; 7:30 p.m., ESPN+		at Tulsa	L 58–77	9–12 (3–6)	15 – Moors	5 – Walker	2 – Tied	Reynolds Center (1,110); Tulsa, OK
January 31, 2026; 3:00 p.m., ESPN+		at North Texas	L 49–67	9–13 (3–7)	23 – Rodgers	8 – Onugha	2 – Plata	The Super Pit (1,365); Denton, TX
February 7, 2026; 2:00 p.m., ESPN+		UAB	W 68–63	10–13 (4–7)	25 – Rodgers	7 – Tied	5 – Moors	Eleanor R. Baldwin Arena (738); Boca Raton, FL
February 10, 2026; 7:00 p.m., ESPN+		at Wichita State	W 79–77 ^{OT}	11–13 (5–7)	21 – Rodgers	9 – Moors	2 – Tied	Charles Koch Arena (747); Wichita, KS
February 14, 2026; 2:00 p.m., ESPN+		Tulsa	W 61–55	12–13 (6–7)	16 – Jackson	8 – Onugha	3 – Plata	Eleanor R. Baldwin Arena (808); Boca Raton, FL
February 17, 2026; 6:00 p.m., ESPN+		at East Carolina	L 61–74	12–14 (6–8)	16 – Rodgers	11 – Rodgers	10 – Moors	Williams Arena (933); Greenville, NC
February 21, 2026; 7:00 p.m., ESPN+		at South Florida	L 55–75	12–15 (6–9)	12 – Onugha	5 – Tied	6 – Moors	Yuengling Center (2,111); Tampa, FL
February 24, 2026; 7:00 p.m., ESPN+		Charlotte	L 56–57	12–16 (6–10)	12 – Rodgers	8 – Rodgers	3 – Tied	Eleanor R. Baldwin Arena (617); Boca Raton, FL
March 3, 2026; 7:00 p.m., ESPN+		Tulane	W 61−57	13−16 (7−10)	13 – Simmons	7 – Plata	4 – Moors	Eleanor R. Baldwin Arena (665); Boca Raton, FL
March 7, 2026; 2:00 p.m., ESPN+		at Temple	L 56–84	13–17 (7–11)	11 – Jackson	5 – Tied	2 – Tied	Liacouras Center (1,346); Philadelphia, PA
American tournament
March 10, 2026; 1:00 p.m., ESPN+	(9)	vs. (8) Charlotte; First Round	W 74–70 ^{OT}	14–17	16 – Onugha	9 – Onugha	5 – Moors	Legacy Arena (301); Birmingham, AL
March 11, 2026; 1:00 p.m., ESPN+	(10)	vs. (5) North Texas; Second Round	L 57–80	14–18	18 – Onugha	10 – Onugha	2 – Tied	Legacy Arena (307); Birmingham, AL
*Non-conference game. ^{#}Rankings from AP Poll. (#) Tournament seedings in parentheses. All times are in Eastern.
