= Karen Aston =

American basketball ex-player and coach (born 1964)

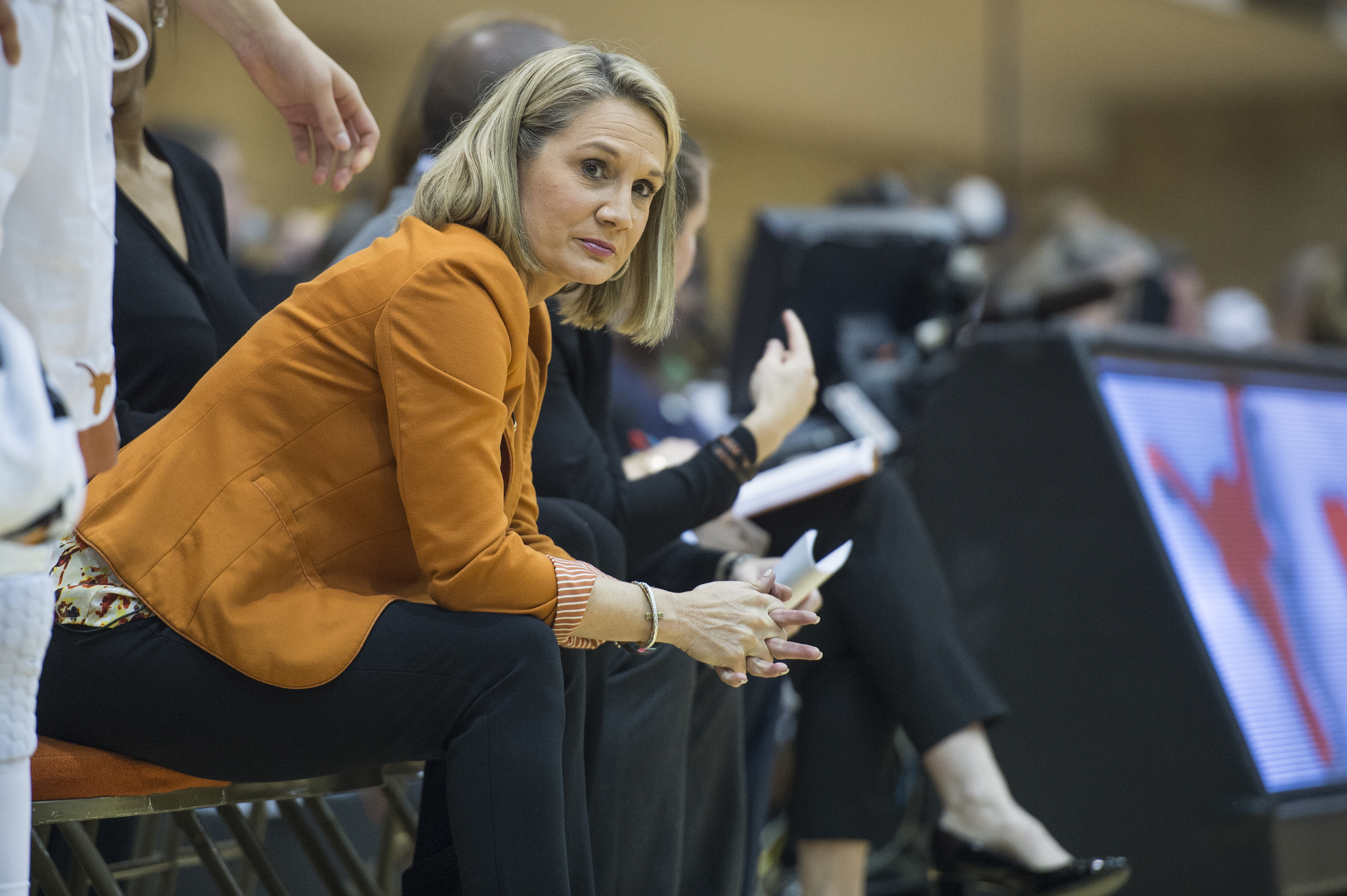
- Aston in 2016

Current position
- Title: Head coach
- Team: UTSA
- Conference: The American
- Record: 82–78 (.513)

Biographical details
- Born: July 26, 1964 (age 62); Benton, Arkansas, U.S.

Playing career
- 1985–1987: Arkansas–Little Rock

Coaching career (HC unless noted)
- 1994–1996: Baylor (asst.)
- 1996–1998: North Texas (asst.)
- 1998–2006: Texas (asst.)
- 2006–2007: Baylor (assoc. HC)
- 2007–2011: Charlotte
- 2011–2012: North Texas
- 2012–2020: Texas
- 2021–present: UTSA

Head coaching record
- Overall: 367–224 (.621)
- Tournaments: 10–8 (NCAA); 5–3 (WNIT); 0–1 (WBIT)

Accomplishments and honors

Championships
- Atlantic 10 tournament (2009); AAC regular season (2025); American tournament (2026)

Awards
- Big 12 Coach of the Year (2017); AAC Coach of the Year (2025)

Karen Sue Aston (born July 26, 1964) is an American basketball player and coach. She is currently the head coach of the UTSA Roadrunners women's basketball team, a position she has served in since 2021. She has served as the head women's basketball coach at Texas, Charlotte and North Texas. Aston has a career record of 323–203 (.614). In her first 13 seasons as a head coach, Aston's teams have averaged 22 wins per year and have made a combined ten postseason appearances.

Aston was one of four finalists for the Naismith Women's College Coach of the Year award in 2017 and was one of ten semifinalists for the honor in 2018. She also earned Big 12 Coach of the Year accolades in 2017. In 2025 she was named the American Athletic Conference Coach of the Year while leading UTSA to a regular season Conference championship.

== Background ==
In her career as a college assistant coach, Aston has served under three coaches in the Naismith Basketball Hall of Fame. As associate head coach at Baylor, she worked for Kim Mulkey; in an earlier stint at Baylor she served under Sonja Hogg. Prior to becoming Baylor's associate head coach, she served eight seasons in the same capacity at The University of Texas at Austin under Jody Conradt.

== Charlotte ==
Aston was introduced as the 49ers' new head coach on April 27, 2007. She replaced Amanda Butler, who left Charlotte after six seasons (two as head coach) to coach her alma mater, the University of Florida. Aston inherited a 49ers team that had made five consecutive postseason appearances including a WNIT berth in 2007. After a WNIT appearance in 2008, she led the 49ers to the 2009 Atlantic 10 Conference tournament title, and an 11th seed in the 2009 NCAA Division I women's basketball tournament. After a run to the final four of the WNIT in 2011, Aston resigned on April 6, 2011 and soon thereafter accepted the head coaching position at North Texas in order to be closer to her family in Arkansas.

== North Texas ==
On April 11, 2011, Karen Aston was named the sixth head coach of the University of North Texas (UNT) women's basketball program. She returned to the university where she had coached as an assistant from 1996 to 1998 under longtime UNT head coach Tina Slinker. Aston took over a program that had gone 5–25 the previous year, and tripled that win total her first year with a 15–16 overall record. On February 18, 2012, Aston earned her 100th victory as a head coach.

== Texas ==
Aston was named the fourth head coach in University of Texas women's basketball history on April 3, 2012. At the University of Texas, she led the Longhorns to a 184–83 (.689) record in eight seasons. In her final seven seasons combined at Texas, Aston's teams averaged 24.6 wins per year, making six NCAA tournament appearances. From 2015 to 2018, her squads made four consecutive NCAA Sweet Sixteen showings, marking the first time that had been accomplished at Texas since 1990. Aston also directed the 2015–16 Longhorns to the program's first NCAA Elite Eight appearance since 2003.

Six of Aston's Texas players (Nneka Enemkpali, Imani McGee-Stafford, Ariel Atkins, Joyner Holmes, Sug Sutton and Charli Collier) were drafted by WNBA teams. Collier was the first pick in the 2021 WNBA draft. McGee-Stafford (10th) and Atkins (7th) also were selected as first-round picks. As a starter, Atkins helped lead the Washington Mystics to the 2019 WNBA championship and has earned WNBA All-Defensive Team honors in each of her three seasons.

Each of Aston's eight teams at Texas ranked in the top 25 nationally in rebounding margin, including three years in the top five. Her 2017–18 and 2018–19 teams ranked third in the NCAA in rebounding margin. Four of the top-eight single-season team rebounding averages in Texas history came during Aston's tenure, as did five of the top-nine best seasons in field-goal percentage defense.

Aston's prowess as one of the nation's best recruiters is also well known. Five of the classes she recruited to Texas were ranked among the top-11 in the nation according to ESPN.com, including three top-five classes. Recruits Charli Collier and Joyner Holmes were both No. 2 prospects according to ESPN and were listed as the nation's top recruits by some services. Aston brought 14 McDonald's All-Americans to Texas during her eight seasons.

== UTSA ==
On March 29, 2021 Aston was named the tenth head coach for UTSA by Athletics director Dr. Lisa Campos in hopes of revitalizing the program. Jordyn Jenkins had a breakout 2022–23 season under Aston's tutelage, taking home C-USA Player of the Year, Newcomer of the Year, and First-Team All-C-USA. The 2023-24 season she led the Runners to their first-ever post conference tournament victory on March 21, 2024, with an 80-62 win over Northern Colorado in the First Round of the 2024 Postseason WNIT.

== Head coaching record ==
Record table
Season	Team	Overall	Conference	Standing	Postseason
Charlotte 49ers (Atlantic 10 Conference) (2007–2011)
2007–08	Charlotte	18–14	9–5	4th	WNIT First Round
2008–09	Charlotte	23–9	11–3	2nd	NCAA First Round
2009–10	Charlotte	18–14	9–5	4th	WNIT Second Round
2010–11	Charlotte	27–10	9–5	3rd	WNIT Final Four
Charlotte:		86–47 (.647)	38–18 (.679)		
North Texas Mean Green (Sun Belt Conference) (2011–2012)
2011–12	North Texas	15–16	7–9	3rd	
North Texas:		15–16 (.484)	7–9 (.438)		
Texas Longhorns (Big 12 Conference) (2012–2020)
2012–13	Texas	12–18	5–13	8th	
2013–14	Texas	22–12	11–7	3rd	NCAA Second Round
2014–15	Texas	24–11	9–9	T–3rd	NCAA Sweet Sixteen
2015–16	Texas	31–5	15–3	2nd	NCAA Elite Eight
2016–17	Texas	25–9	15–3	2nd	NCAA Sweet Sixteen
2017–18	Texas	28–7	15–3	2nd	NCAA Sweet Sixteen
2018–19	Texas	23–10	12–6	3rd	NCAA First Round
2019–20	Texas	19–11	11–7	3rd	
Texas:		184–83 (.689)	93–51 (.646)		
UTSA Roadrunners (Conference USA) (2021–2023)
2021–22	UTSA	7–23	3–11	7th	
2022–23	UTSA	13–19	9–11	6th	
UTSA Roadrunners (American Athletic Conference) (2023–present)
2023–24	UTSA	18–15	10–8	T–4th	WNIT Second Round
2024–25	UTSA	26–5	17–1	1st	WBIT First Round
2025–26	UTSA	18–16	9–9	6th	NCAA First Round
UTSA:		82–78 (.513)	48–40 (.545)		
Total:		367–224 (.621)			
National champion Postseason invitational champion Conference regular season champion Conference regular season and conference tournament champion Division regular season champion Division regular season and conference tournament champion Conference tournament champion
