= 2025–26 South Florida Bulls women's basketball team =

American college basketball season

2025–26 South Florida Bulls women's basketball
- Conference: American Conference
- Record: 20–12 (13–5 American)
- Head coach: Michele Woods-Baxter (interim) (1st season)
- Assistant coaches: Bojan Jankovic; Sheila Boykin; Gina Cerezuela Robuste; Justin Keller
- Home arena: Yuengling Center

2025–26 American Conference women's basketball standings
	Conf.				Overall
Team	W		L	PCT	W		L	PCT
Rice	17	–	1	.944	29	–	6	.829
East Carolina	14	–	4	.778	22	–	10	.688
South Florida	13	–	5	.722	20	–	12	.625
Tulsa	11	–	7	.611	19	–	12	.613
North Texas	11	–	7	.611	19	–	14	.576
UTSA †	9	–	9	.500	18	–	16	.529
Temple	8	–	10	.444	15	–	17	.469
Charlotte	8	–	10	.444	14	–	18	.438
Florida Atlantic	7	–	11	.389	14	–	18	.438
Tulane	6	–	12	.333	11	–	20	.355
Wichita State	5	–	13	.278	8	–	23	.258
UAB	4	–	14	.222	11	–	19	.367
Memphis	4	–	14	.222	10	–	21	.323
† 2026 American tournament winner

The 2025–26 South Florida Bulls women's basketball team represented the University of South Florida during the 2025–26 NCAA Division I women's basketball season. The Bulls, led by interim head coach Michele Woods-Baxter, played their home games at Yuengling Center in Tampa, Florida as members of the American Conference.

== Previous season ==
The Bulls finished the 2024–25 season 23–11, 13–4 in AAC play to finish in third place. They defeated Tulane, North Texas and Rice to win the AAC tournament They received an automatic bid to the NCAA tournament as the No. 12 seed Birmingham 3 region. They lost in the first round to Tennessee.

== Offseason ==
=== Departures ===
South Florida departures
Name	Num	Pos.	Height	Year	Hometown	Reason for departure
Sammie Puisis	3	G	6'1"	Graduate student	Mason, OH	Graduated/undrafted in 2025 WNBA draft; signed with Chicago Sky
Mama Dembele	4	G	5'6"	Graduate student	Manlleu, Spain	Graduated/signed to play professionally in Spain with Valencia Basket
Vittoria Blasigh	5	G	5'9"	Sophomore	Udine, Italy	Transferred to Miami (FL)
Amy Thompson	12	G	5'10"	Freshman	Stillwater, MN	Transferred to Tampa (DII)
Jeniffer Silva	15	C	6'4"	Junior	Recife, Brazil	Transferred to Western Kentucky
Romi Levy	23	G	6'3"	(redshirt) Senior	Herzliya, Israel	Transferred to Virginia

=== Incoming transfers ===
South Florida incoming transfers
Name	Num	Pos.	Height	Year	Hometown	Previous school
Katie Davidson	1	G/F	5'10"	Graduate student	Indianapolis, IN	IU Indy
Edyn Battle	10	G	5'7"	Graduate student	Gahanna, OH	Jacksonville
Kristen Lewis-Williams	11	G	5'10"	Junior	Mooresville, NC	Buffalo
Stefanie Ingram	13	G	5'8"	(redshirt) Junior	Orlando, FL	Florida Atlantic

==== Recruiting ====
There was no recruiting class of 2025.

== Roster ==
2025–26 South Florida Bulls women's basketball team
Players
Coaches

Pos.	#	Name	Height	Year	Previous school	Hometown
G	1	Katie Davidson	5 ft 10 in (1.78 m)	GS	IU Indy	Indianapolis, IN
F	2	Yana Karamfilova	6 ft 2 in (1.88 m)	So	Todor Kableshkov High School	Sofia, Bulgaria
F	8	Fatou Diakite	6 ft 3 in (1.91 m)	Jr	Charlotte	Abidjan, Ivory Coast
G	9	Janette Aarnio	5 ft 11 in (1.8 m)	Sr	Helsinki Basketball Academy	Vantaa, Finland
G	10	Edyn Battle	5 ft 7 in (1.7 m)	Sr	Jacksonville	Gahanna, OH
G	11	Kirsten Lewis-Williams	5 ft 10 in (1.78 m)	Jr	Buffalo	Mooresville, NC
G	13	Stefanie Ingram	5 ft 8 in (1.73 m)	RS Jr	Florida Atlantic	Orlando, FL
F	14	Ines Piper	6 ft 0 in (1.83 m)	GS	Temple	Paris, France
F	21	L'or Mputu	6 ft 2 in (1.88 m)	GS	Eastern Florida State College	Kinshasa, DR Congo
G	22	Lee Teichman	5 ft 8 in (1.73 m)	Fr		Bitan Aharon, Israel
G	23	Jelena Bulajic	5 ft 10 in (1.78 m)	Fr		Herceg Novi, Montenegro
G	24	Raina Tomasicka	5 ft 11 in (1.8 m)	So	Tarbes GB	Jēkabpils, Latvia
F	55	Carla Brito	5 ft 11 in (1.8 m)	Sr	SPAR Gran Canaria	Puerto del Rosario, Spain

Head coach

- Jose Fernandez (FIU) (until October 23, 2025)
- Michelle Woods-Baxter (St. John Fisher) (interim, since October 23, 2025)

Assistant coach(es)

- Bojan Jankovic (Ozarks)
- Sheila Boykin (LSU)
- Gina Cerezuela Robuste (Coker)
- Justin Keller (South Florida)

Legend

- (C) Team captain
- (S) Suspended
- (I) Ineligible
- (W) Walk-on
- Injured
- Current redshirt

Roster

== Schedule and results ==
Date time, TV	Rank^{#}	Opponent^{#}	Result	Record	High points	High rebounds	High assists	Site (attendance) city, state
Non-conference regular season
November 3, 2025*; 6:00 p.m., ESPN+		FIU	W 81–56	1–0	20 – Mputu	12 – Mputu	7 – Ingram	Yuengling Center; Tampa, FL
November 7, 2025*; 7:00 p.m., ESPN+		LIU	W 79–72	2–0	23 – Battle	10 – Piper	9 – Ingram	Yuengling Center (2,302); Tampa, FL
November 13, 2025*; 6:00 p.m., ESPNU		vs. Fairfield; WBCA Challenge	L 72–80	2–1	17 – Davidson	12 – Mputu	8 – Ingram	Michelob Ultra Arena (1,588); Las Vegas, NV
November 15, 2025*; 9:00 p.m., ESPN+		vs. No. 3 UCLA; WBCA Challenge	L 61–94	2–2	16 – Davidson	6 – Mputu	5 – Ingram	Michelob Ultra Arena (2,116); Las Vegas, NV
November 20, 2025*; 8:00 p.m., ESPN2		Duke	W 85–72	3–2	27 – Ingram	13 – Mputu	5 – Ingram	Yuengling Center (2,772); Tampa, FL
November 24, 2025*; 4:00 p.m., FloHoops		vs. Minnesota; Pink Flamingo Championship Junkanoo Division semifinals	L 45–57	3–3	16 – Diakite	7 – Diakite	4 – Brito	Baha Mar Convention Center (207); Nassau, Bahamas
November 26, 2025*; 6:30 p.m., FloHoops		vs. Harvard; Pink Flamingo Championship Junkanoo Division 3rd place	W 56–54	4–3	14 – Tomasicka	10 – Lewis-Williams	3 – Ingram	Baha Mar Convention Center (247); Nassau, Bahamas
November 30, 2025*; 2:00 p.m., ESPN+		New Orleans	W 90–58	5–3	21 – Tomasicka	11 – Diakite	9 – Ingram	Yuengling Center (2,398); Tampa, FL
December 2, 2025*; 5:00 p.m., ESPN2		No. 1 UConn	L 51–85	5–4	12 – Mputu	7 – Tied	5 – Ingram	Yuengling Center (5,863); Tampa, FL
December 5, 2025*; 11:00 a.m., ESPN+		Houston Christian	W 91–58	6–4	17 – Mputu	12 – Mputu	6 – Ingram	Yuengling Center (10,488); Tampa, FL
December 15, 2025*; 7:30 p.m., SECN+/ESPN+		at No. 13 Vanderbilt	L 58–87	6–5	23 – Ingram	6 – Davidson	4 – Ingram	Memorial Gymnasium (2,188); Nashville, TN
December 18, 2025*; 7:00 p.m., ESPN2		No. 3 South Carolina	L 44–103	6–6	10 – Bulajic	7 – Tied	4 – Brito	Yuengling Center (3,767); Tampa, FL
December 21, 2025*; 1:00 p.m., ESPN+		Navy	W 86–74	7–6	21 – Brito	14 – Brito	10 – Ingram	Yuengling Center (5,509); Tampa, FL
American regular season
December 30, 2025; 7:00 p.m., ESPN+		Rice	L 68–70	7–7 (0–1)	16 – Battle	13 – Brito	4 – Battle	Yuengling Center (2,105); Tampa, FL
January 3, 2026; 7:00 p.m., ESPN+		North Texas	W 77–61	8−7 (1−1)	17 – Battle	10 – Brito	5 – Ingram	Yuengling Center (2,137); Tampa, FL
January 6, 2026; 7:00 p.m., ESPN+		at UAB	W 70–65	9−7 (2−1)	20 – Davidson	14 – Mputu	6 – Battle	Bartow Arena (206); Birmingham, AL
January 10, 2025; 3:00 p.m., ESPN+		at Memphis	W 90–81	10–7 (3–1)	20 – Davidson	8 – Mputu	13 – Ingram	Elma Roane Fieldhouse (1,381); Memphis, TN
January 13, 2026; 7:00 p.m., ESPN+		UTSA	W 70−53	11−7 (4−1)	15 – Bulajic	9 – Brito	5 – Battle	Yuengling Center (1,896); Tampa, FL
January 17, 2026; 7:00 p.m., ESPN+		Wichita State	W 75–53	12–7 (5–1)	24 – Davidson	10 – Brito	10 – Battle	Yuengling Center (2,581); Tampa, FL
January 20, 2026; 7:00 p.m., ESPN+		at Temple	L 83–86	12–8 (5–2)	20 – Brito	9 – Brito	10 – Ingram	Liacouras Center (1,223); Philadelphia, PA
January 24, 2026; 2:00 p.m., ESPN+		at Florida Atlantic	L 63–64	12–9 (5–3)	17 – Ingram	11 – Brito	3 – Brito	Eleanor R. Baldwin Arena (952); Boca Raton, FL
January 27, 2026; 7:00 p.m., ESPN+		Charlotte	W 66–60 ^{OT}	13–9 (6–3)	21 – Battle	8 – Ingram	4 – Ingram	Yuengling Center (2,187); Tampa, FL
February 4, 2026; 6:00 p.m., ESPN+		at East Carolina	L 62–64	13–10 (6–4)	17 – Tied	13 – Mputu	6 – Tied	Williams Arena (1,088); Greenville, NC
February 7, 2026; 7:00 p.m., ESPN+		Tulane	W 85–53	14–10 (7–4)	14 – Tied	19 – Brito	9 – Ingram	Yuengling Center (2,918); Tampa, FL
February 11, 2026; 7:00 p.m., ESPN+		Tulsa	W 72–60	15–10 (8–4)	22 – Davidson	15 – Brito	7 – Tied	Yuengling Center (2,414); Tampa, FL
February 14, 2026; 7:30 p.m., ESPN+		at UTSA	W 69–63	16–10 (9–4)	17 – Tied	12 – Brito	9 – Battle	Convocation Center (694); San Antonio, TX
February 17, 2026; 8:00 p.m., ESPN+		at Rice	L 72–79	16–11 (9–5)	20 – Battle	14 – Brito	4 – Ingram	Tudor Fieldhouse (1,011); Houston, TX
February 21, 2026; 7:00 p.m., ESPN+		Florida Atlantic	W 75–55	17–11 (10–5)	17 – Mputu	14 – Brito	9 – Ingram	Yuengling Center (2,111); Tampa, FL
February 28, 2026; 3:00 p.m., ESPN+		at North Texas	W 66–63	18–11 (11–5)	19 – Battle	9 – Brito	6 – Ingram	The Super Pit (2,007); Denton, TX
March 3, 2026; 7:00 p.m., ESPN+		Temple	W 82–36	19–11 (12–5)	20 – Mputu	8 – Mputu	12 – Battle	Yuengling Center (2,551); Tampa, FL
March 7, 2026; 3:00 p.m., ESPN+		at Tulane	W 58–49	20–11 (13–5)	21 – Davidson	14 – Mputu	5 – Ingram	Devlin Fieldhouse (849); New Orleans, LA
American tournament
March 12, 2026; 3:00 p.m., ESPN+	(3)	vs. (6) UTSA; Quarterfinals	L 51–62	21–13	16 – Mputu	10 – Mputu	3 – Tied	Legacy Arena; Birmingham, AL
*Non-conference game. ^{#}Rankings from AP Poll. (#) Tournament seedings in parentheses. All times are in Eastern.

== Rankings ==
Ranking movements Legend: — = Not ranked RV = Received votes
	Week																				
Poll	Pre	1	2	3	4	5	6	7	8	9	10	11	12	13	14	15	16	17	18	19	Final
AP	—	—																			
Coaches	RV																				
