= 2025–26 Charlotte 49ers women's basketball team =

American college basketball season

2025–26 Charlotte 49ers women's basketball
- Conference: American Conference
- Record: 14–18 (8–10 American)
- Head coach: Tomekia Reed (2nd season)
- Assistant coaches: LaShonda Cousin; Chase Campbell; Aaron A. Swinson
- Home arena: Dale F. Halton Arena

2025–26 American Conference women's basketball standings
	Conf.				Overall
Team	W		L	PCT	W		L	PCT
Rice	17	–	1	.944	29	–	6	.829
East Carolina	14	–	4	.778	22	–	10	.688
South Florida	13	–	5	.722	20	–	12	.625
Tulsa	11	–	7	.611	19	–	12	.613
North Texas	11	–	7	.611	19	–	14	.576
UTSA †	9	–	9	.500	18	–	16	.529
Temple	8	–	10	.444	15	–	17	.469
Charlotte	8	–	10	.444	14	–	18	.438
Florida Atlantic	7	–	11	.389	14	–	18	.438
Tulane	6	–	12	.333	11	–	20	.355
Wichita State	5	–	13	.278	8	–	23	.258
UAB	4	–	14	.222	11	–	19	.367
Memphis	4	–	14	.222	10	–	21	.323
† 2026 American tournament winner

The 2025–26 Charlotte 49ers women's basketball team represented the University of North Carolina at Charlotte during the 2025–26 NCAA Division I women's basketball season. The 49ers, led by second-year head coach Tomekia Reed, played their home games at Dale F. Halton Arena in Charlotte, North Carolina as members of the American Conference.

On January 15, 2026, it was announced that graduate student center Daphane White had been dismissed from the team due to rule violations over the Christmas break.

== Previous season ==
The 49ers finished the 2024–25 season 11–21 and 4–14 in AAC play, tying with Wichita State. They ultimately clinched the No. 12 seed due to the Shockers' better overall record.

As the No. 12 seed, they beat No. 13 Florida Atlantic in the first round, then upsetting No. 5 Tulsa in the second round. They were eliminated from the tournament when they lost to No. 4 Temple in the quarterfinals.

== Offseason ==
=== Departures ===
Charlotte Departures
Name	Num	Pos.	Height	Year	Hometown	Reason for Departure
Jordan Peete	1	G	5'6"	Graduate Student	St. Louis, MO	Graduated
Kay Kay Green	2	G	5'6"	Graduate Student	Chicago, IL	Graduated
Alexis Andrews	4	G	5'8"	Junior	Montgomery, AL	Transferred to Monmouth
Nia Young	5	G	6'0"	RS Junior	Raleigh, NC	Transferred to North Carolina Central
Jayla Kelly	7	C	6'3"	Graduate Student	St. Louis, MO	Graduated
Madison Roshelle	11	G	5'11"	Senior	Cincinnati, OH	TBD; entered transfer portal (Note: Roshelle entered the transfer portal and was removed from the Charlotte roster mid-season during the 2024–25 season.)
Hayleigh Breland	23	G	5'8"	Junior	Wiggins, MS	Transferred to Southern Miss
Aanaya Harris	24	F	5'11"	Senior	Omaha, NE	Graduated
Keanna Rembert	31	F	6'2"	RS Junior	Raleigh, NC	Transferred to East Carolina
Tena Ikidi	40	F	6'3"	Senior	Bayelsa, Nigeria	Graduated/transferred to Cal State Bakersfield

=== Incoming transfers ===
Charlotte incoming transfers
Name	Num	Pos.	Height	Year	Hometown	Previous School
Zoe Best	0	G	5'10"	Sophomore	St. Louis, MO	Southeast Missouri State
Asianae Nicholson	1	F	5'10"	Senior	South Euclid, OH	Bethune-Cookman
Karen Nimo	2	G	5'10"	Sophomore	Augusta, GA	Eastern Florida State (NJCAA)
Tanajah Hayes	3	G	5'6"	Graduate Student	Charlotte, NC	FIU
Princess Anderson	4	G	5'7"	Senior	Beaumont, TX	Wichita State
Caitlin Staley	5	F	6'4"	Junior	Augusta, GA	Western Kentucky
Taliah Cornish	7	G	5'7"	Sophomore	Atlanta, GA	South Plains (NJCAA)
Ja'Navia Gage	10	F	6'3"	Junior	Huntsville, TX	Gulf Coast State (NJCAA)
Alana Rouser	11	F	6'0"	Sophomore	Madison, MS	Florida Atlantic
Lucy Henderson	13	G	6'0"	Junior	Bossier City, LA	Kilgore (NJCAA)

=== Recruiting class ===
There was no recruiting class for the class of 2025.

== Roster ==
2025–26 Charlotte 49ers women's basketball team
Players
Coaches

Pos.	#	Name	Height	Year	Previous school	Hometown
G	0	Zoe Best	5 ft 10 in (1.78 m)	So	Incarnate Word Academy; Southeast Missouri State	St. Louis, MO
F	1	Asianae Nicholson	5 ft 10 in (1.78 m)	Sr	Charles F. Brush High School; Alabama A&M; Bethune-Cookman	South Euclid, OH
G	2	Karen Nimo	5 ft 10 in (1.78 m)	So	Butler High School; Eastern Florida State College	Augusta, GA
G	3	Tanajah Hayes	5 ft 6 in (1.68 m)	GS	Julius L. Chambers High School; FIU	Charlotte, NC
G	4	Princess Anderson	5 ft 7 in (1.7 m)	Sr	Beaumont United High School; Pratt CC; Wichita State	Beaumont, TX
F	5	Caitlin Staley	6 ft 4 in (1.93 m)	Jr	Greenbrier High School; Western Kentucky	Augusta, GA
G	7	Taliah Cornish	5 ft 7 in (1.7 m)	So	Maynard H. Jackson High School; South Plains College	Atlanta, GA
F	8	Ja'Navia Gage	6 ft 3 in (1.91 m)	Jr	Gulf Coast State College	Huntsville, TX
F	11	Alana Rouser	6 ft 0 in (1.83 m)	So	Germantown High School; Florida Atlantic	Madison, MS
G	12	Imani Smith	5 ft 8 in (1.73 m)	GS	Hiram High School; Gulf Coast State College	Hiram, GA
G	13	Lucy Henderson	6 ft 0 in (1.83 m)	Jr	Parkway High School; Kilgore	Bossier City, LA
G/F	22	Caroline Thiel	6 ft 0 in (1.83 m)	Jr	Rocky Mount High School	Rocky Mount, NC
G	23	McKenzie Graves	5 ft 8 in (1.73 m)	Fr	NC GGB Academy	Durham, NC

Head coach

- Tomekia Reed (Georgia Southwestern State)

Assistant coach(es)

- LaShonda Cousin (Mississippi State)
- Chase Campbell (Paine College)
- Aaron A. Swinson (Auburn)

Legend

- (C) Team captain
- (S) Suspended
- (I) Ineligible
- (W) Walk-on
- Injured
- Current redshirt

Roster

== Schedule and results ==
Date time, TV	Rank^{#}	Opponent^{#}	Result	Record	High points	High rebounds	High assists	Site (attendance) city, state
Non-conference regular season
November 3, 2025*; 5:30 p.m., ESPN+		Auburn	L 58–71	0–1	17 – Nimo	9 – Nicholson	6 – Hayes	Halton Arena (1,226); Charlotte, NC
November 6, 2025*; 6:30 p.m., ESPN+		Campbell	W 61–50	1–1	26 – Anderson	9 – Nicholson	4 – Hayes	Halton Arena; Charlotte, NC
November 9, 2025*; 2:00 p.m., ESPN+		at UCF	W 66–64	2–1	26 – Anderson	18 – Nicholson	8 – Hayes	Addition Financial Arena (973); Orlando, FL
November 12, 2025*; 8:00 p.m., SECN+/ESPN+		at No. 5 LSU	L 59–117	2–2	27 – Anderson	9 – Nicholson	2 – Hayes	Maravich Assembly Center (9,348); Baton Rouge, LA
November 15, 2025*; 6:00 p.m., ACCNX		vs. California; Raising the B.A.R Invitational semifinal	L 44–69	2–3	10 – Best	6 – Staley	7 – Hayes	Haas Pavilion (137); Berkeley, CA
November 16, 2025*; 8:00 p.m., ACCNX		vs. Oakland; Raising the B.A.R Invitational consolation	W 66–41	3–3	19 – Best	8 – Best	6 – Cornish	Haas Pavilion; Berkeley, CA
November 22, 2025*; 2:00 p.m., ESPN+		Wofford	W 73–59	4–3	16 – Tied	6 – Tied	7 – Hayes	Halton Arena (631); Charlotte, NC
November 28, 2025*; 11:00 a.m., FloCollege		vs. No. 24 Oklahoma State; Cayman Islands Classic Little Cayman Division	L 65–74	4–4	18 – Best	6 – Best	3 – Hayes	John Gray Gymnasium (450); George Town, Cayman Islands
November 29, 2025*; 1:30 p.m., FloCollege		vs. George Washington; Cayman Islands Classic Little Cayman Division	L 67–81	4–5	14 – Cornish	10 – Gage	6 – Hayes	John Gray Gymnasium (135); George Town, Cayman Islands
December 7, 2025*; 8:00 p.m., SECN+/ESPN+		at Mississippi State	L 59–89	4–6	17 – Anderson	10 – Nicholson	3 – Smith	Humphrey Coliseum (3,473); Starkville, MS
December 14, 2025*; 7:00 p.m., ESPN+		Davidson	W 71–61	5–6	19 – Hayes	9 – Gage	8 – Hayes	Halton Arena (693); Charlotte, NC
December 17, 2025*; 11:00 a.m., ESPN+		Winthrop	W 81–58	6–6	13 – Best	13 – Nicholson	10 – Hayes	Halton Arena (2,958); Charlotte, NC
December 21, 2025*; 11:00 a.m., ESPN+		East Tennessee State	L 50–51	6–7	14 – Hayes	9 – Nicholson	5 – Hayes	Halton Arena (607); Charlotte, NC
American regular season
December 31, 2025; 3:00 p.m., ESPN+		Memphis	W 62–49	7–7 (1–0)	28 – Anderson	16 – Gage	8 – Hayes	Halton Arena (617); Charlotte, NC
January 3, 2026; 3:00 p.m., ESPN+		UAB	W 71–60	8–7 (2–0)	23 – Hayes	9 – Gage	5 – Hayes	Halton Arena (667); Charlotte, NC
January 7, 2026; 8:00 p.m., ESPN+		at Rice	L 59–84	8–8 (2–1)	26 – Anderson	11 – Gage	3 – Best	Tudor Fieldhouse (619); Houston, TX
January 10, 2026; 1:00 p.m., ESPN+		at UTSA	L 63–69	8–9 (2–2)	20 – Anderson	18 – Nicholson	7 – Hayes	Convocation Center (735); San Antonio, TX
January 17, 2026; 4:00 p.m., ESPN+		Tulsa	L 53–64	8–10 (2–3)	28 – Hayes	6 – Nicholson	3 – Hayes	Halton Arena (821); Charlotte, NC
January 20, 2026; 6:30 p.m., ESPN+		Florida Atlantic	W 77–56	9–10 (3–3)	14 – Hayes	11 – Nicholson	6 – Hayes	Halton Arena (604); Charlotte, NC
January 24, 2026; 2:00 p.m., ESPN+		at Temple	L 82–83	9–11 (3–4)	24 – Hayes	10 – Nicholson	10 – Hayes	Liacouras Center (1,352); Philadelphia, PA
January 27, 2026; 7:00 p.m., ESPN+		at South Florida	L 60–66 ^{OT}	9–12 (3–5)	16 – Hayes	18 – Nicholson	3 – Cornish	Yuengling Center (2,187); Tampa, FL
January 30, 2026; 3:00 p.m., ESPN+		East Carolina	L 61–67	9–13 (3–6)	15 – Hayes	10 – Nicholson	9 – Hayes	Halton Arena (544); Charlotte, NC
February 4, 2026; 7:30 p.m., ESPN+		at Tulane	W 47–44	10–13 (4–6)	17 – Anderson	13 – Nicholson	6 – Hayes	Devlin Fieldhouse (731); New Orleans, LA
February 7, 2026; 4:00 p.m., ESPN+		Wichita State	W 81–72	11–13 (5–6)	19 – Anderson	17 – Nicholson	3 – Tied	Halton Arena (716); Charlotte, NC
February 14, 2026; 3:00 p.m., ESPN+		at Memphis	W 61–58	12–13 (6–6)	23 – Anderson	17 – Nicholson	10 – Hayes	Elma Roane Fieldhouse (1,111); Memphis, TN
February 17, 2026; 6:30 p.m., ESPN+		Temple	L 54–58	12–14 (6–7)	19 – Anderson	9 – Gage	3 – Hayes	Halton Arena (612); Charlotte, NC
February 21, 2026; 5:00 p.m., ESPN+		North Texas; Play4Kay	L 73–82	12–15 (6–8)	23 – Hayes	8 – Gage	3 – Tied	Halton Arena (827); Charlotte, NC
February 24, 2026; 7:00 p.m., ESPN+		at Florida Atlantic	W 57–56	13–15 (7–8)	20 – Anderson	8 – Gage	6 – Hayes	Eleanor R. Baldwin Arena (617); Boca Raton, FL
February 28, 2026; 2:00 p.m., ESPN+		at East Carolina	L 57–64	13–16 (7–9)	23 – Anderson	12 – Tied	5 – Hayes	Williams Arena (1,010); Greenville, NC
March 3, 2026; 6:30 p.m., ESPN+		Rice	L 56–63	13–17 (7–10)	27 – Anderson	14 – Gage	3 – Hayes	Halton Arena (577); Charlotte, NC
March 7, 2026; 3:00 p.m., ESPN+		UAB	W 69–66 ^{OT}	14–17 (8–10)	21 – Anderson	12 – Staley	8 – Hayes	Bartow Arena (453); Birmingham, AL
American tournament
March 10, 2026; 1:00 p.m., ESPN+	(8)	vs. (9) Florida Atlantic; First Round	L 70–74 ^{OT}	14–18	35 – Anderson	9 – Nicholson	2 – Tied	Halton Arena (301); Charlotte, NC
*Non-conference game. ^{#}Rankings from AP Poll. (#) Tournament seedings in parentheses. All times are in Eastern.
