= 2025–26 Temple Owls women's basketball team =

American college basketball season

2025–26 Temple Owls women's basketball
- Conference: American Conference
- Record: 15–17 (8–10 American)
- Head coach: Diane Richardson (4th season)
- Associate head coach: Wanisha Smith
- Assistant coaches: Cheyenne Curley; Myles Jackson; Shenita Landry; Aaron Thomas
- Home arena: Liacouras Center

2025–26 American Conference women's basketball standings
	Conf.				Overall
Team	W		L	PCT	W		L	PCT
Rice	17	–	1	.944	29	–	6	.829
East Carolina	14	–	4	.778	22	–	10	.688
South Florida	13	–	5	.722	20	–	12	.625
Tulsa	11	–	7	.611	19	–	12	.613
North Texas	11	–	7	.611	19	–	14	.576
UTSA †	9	–	9	.500	18	–	16	.529
Temple	8	–	10	.444	15	–	17	.469
Charlotte	8	–	10	.444	14	–	18	.438
Florida Atlantic	7	–	11	.389	14	–	18	.438
Tulane	6	–	12	.333	11	–	20	.355
Wichita State	5	–	13	.278	8	–	23	.258
UAB	4	–	14	.222	11	–	19	.367
Memphis	4	–	14	.222	10	–	21	.323
† 2026 American tournament winner

The 2025–26 Temple Owls women's basketball team represented Temple University during the 2025–26 NCAA Division I women's basketball season. The Owls, led by fourth-year head coach Diane Richardson, played their home games at the Liacouras Center in Philadelphia, Pennsylvania as members of the American Conference.

== Previous season ==
The Owls finished the 2024–25 season 19–10 and 13–5 in AAC play, clinching the No. 4 seed in the AAC tournament. They beat No. 12 Charlotte in the quarterfinals before being eliminated in an upset to eventual tournament runner-up, No. 9 Rice, in the semifinals for the second consecutive year.

== Offseason ==
=== Departures ===
Temple departures
Name	Num	Pos.	Height	Year	Hometown	Reason for departure
Adena Webster	0	G	5'8"	Freshman	Nassau, Bahamas	Transferred to Monmouth
Amaya Oliver	1	F	6'1"	Graduate student	Richmond, CA	Graduated
Makayla Waleed	3	G	5'8"	Junior	Upper Marlboro, MD	Transferred to Winston-Salem (DII) (Note: Waleed did not play during the 2024–25 season.)
Alexandra Wilkinson	13	F/C	6'2"	RS Junior	Woodbury, NJ	TBD; not listed on roster
Anissa Rivera	19	F	6'1"	Graduate student	Capitol Heights, MD	Graduated
Tarriyonna Gary	22	G	5'8"	Senior (5th year)	Brooksville, FL	Graduated
Tiarra East	55	G	5'11"	Senior	Louisville, KY	Graduated

=== Incoming transfers ===
Temple incoming transfers
Name	Num	Pos.	Height	Year	Hometown	Previous school
Brianna Mead	2	G	5'7"	Sophomore	Thompson, CT	LIU
Khloe Miller	24	F	6'3"	RS freshman	Raleigh, NC	East Carolina
Saniyah Craig	91	F	5'11"	Junior	Phoenix, AZ	Jacksonville

=== Recruiting class ===
There was no recruiting class for the class of 2025.

== Roster ==
2025–26 Temple Owls women's basketball team
Players
Coaches

Pos.	#	Name	Height	Year	Previous school	Hometown
F	1	Ariana Meriedy	6 ft 3 in (1.91 m)	Fr	Riverdale Baptist School	Clinton, MD
G	2	Brianna Mead	5 ft 7 in (1.7 m)	So	Putnam Science Academy; LIU	Thompson, CT
G	3	Kelian Cedano	5 ft 9 in (1.75 m)	So	Putnam Science Academy	Boston, MA
G	7	Kaylah Turner	5 ft 6 in (1.68 m)	Jr	Oakleaf High School; Alabama A&M	Jacksonville, FL
F	8	Jaleesa Molina	6 ft 2 in (1.88 m)	Jr	Landslake Lions	The Hague, Netherlands
F	9	Felicia Jacobs	6 ft 2 in (1.88 m)	So	City of London Academy, Southwark	London, England
G	10	Savannah Curry	5 ft 11 in (1.8 m)	So	Westtown School	Fallston, MD
G	11	Tristen Taylor	5 ft 5 in (1.65 m)	Jr	Duncanville HS	Dallas, TX
F	18	Anastasia Bulanova	6 ft 3 in (1.91 m)	Fr	BC Enisey	Novosibirsk, Russia
F	24	Khloe Miller	6 ft 3 in (1.91 m)	RS Fr	Wake Young Women's Leadership Academy; East Carolina	Raleigh, NC
G	30	Drew Alexander	5 ft 11 in (1.8 m)	RS So	Shabach Christian Academy	Greensboro, NC
C	34	Sheyenne Swain-Price	6 ft 0 in (1.83 m)	RS So	Dexter Southfield School	Stoughton, MA
F	91	Saniyah Craig	6 ft 1 in (1.85 m)	Jr	Arizona Compass Prep School	Phoenix, AZ

Head coach

- Diane Richardson (Frostburg State)

Assistant coach(es)

- Wanisha Smith (Duke)
- Cheyenne Curley (Howard)
- Myles Jackson (Towson)
- Shenita Landry (Temple)
- Aaron Thomas (Towson)

Legend

- (C) Team captain
- (S) Suspended
- (I) Ineligible
- (W) Walk-on
- Injured
- Current redshirt

Roster

== Schedule and results ==
Date time, TV	Rank^{#}	Opponent^{#}	Result	Record	High points	High rebounds	High assists	Site (attendance) city, state
Non-conference regular season
November 3, 2025*; 7:00 p.m., ESPN+		George Mason	W 94–85 ^{OT}	1–0	19 – Taylor	15 – Craig	7 – Taylor	Liacouras Center (1,406); Philadelphia, PA
November 7, 2025*; 7:00 p.m., ESPN+		George Washington	W 86–50	2–0	15 – Molina	12 – Craig	8 – Taylor	Liacouras Center (1,302); Philadelphia, PA
November 11, 2025*; 7:00 p.m., ESPN+		at West Virginia	L 61–89	2–1	23 – Turner	8 – Craig	5 – Taylor	Hope Coliseum (2,516); Morgantown, WV
November 14, 2025*; 11:00 a.m., ESPN+		La Salle	W 75–54	3–1	12 – Turner	11 – Craig	4 – Tied	Liacouras Center (3,507); Philadelphia, PA
November 18, 2025*; 6:00 p.m., ESPN+		at Richmond	L 57–72	3–2	22 – Turner	11 – Molina	5 – Taylor	Robins Center (1,233); Richmond, VA
November 22, 2025*; 7:00 p.m., ESPN+		at Villanova	L 58–88	3–3	15 – Taylor	9 – Molina	4 – Taylor	Finneran Pavilion (1,551); Villanova, PA
November 28, 2025*; 6:30 p.m., FloCollege		vs. No. 20 Michigan State; Nassau Championship Junkanoo Division semifinals	L 50–85	3–4	11 – Craig	6 – Tied	3 – Taylor	Baha Mar Convention Center (267); Nassau, Bahamas
November 30, 2025*; 6:30 p.m., FloCollege		vs. Western Carolina; Nassau Championship Junkanoo Division consolation game	W 84–44	4–4	23 – Turner	9 – Molina	4 – Tied	Baha Mar Convention Center (247); Nassau, Bahamas
December 7, 2025*; 2:15 p.m., ESPN+		at Drexel; Toyota Big 5 Classic	L 52–59	4–5	16 – Turner	8 – Molina	3 – Turner	Finneran Pavilion; Villanova, PA
December 13, 2025*; 2:00 p.m., ESPN+		VCU	W 88–63	5–5	29 – Turner	10 – Molina	6 – Tied	Liacouras Center (1,393); Philadelphia, PA
December 19, 2025*; 7:00 p.m., ESPN+		Coppin State	W 59–39	6–5	12 – Tied	13 – Molina	4 – Mead	Liacouras Center (1,377); Philadelphia, PA
December 22, 2025*; 11:30 a.m., ESPN+		at Princeton	L 77–87	6–6	36 – Turner	12 – Craig	5 – Craig	Jadwin Gymnasium (3,000); Princeton, NJ
American regular season
January 3, 2026; 2:30 p.m., ESPN+		UTSA	L 47–50	6–7 (0–1)	18 – Taylor	11 – Craig	3 – Taylor	Liacouras Center (4,038); Philadelphia, PA
January 6, 2026; 7:00 p.m., ESPN+		at Wichita State	W 70–50	7–7 (1–1)	13 – Tied	7 – Molina	5 – Taylor	Charles Koch Arena (760); Wichita, KS
January 9, 2026; 7:30 p.m., ESPN+		at Tulsa	L 82–94	7–8 (1–2)	31 – Turner	7 – Tied	6 – Taylor	Reynolds Center (1,128); Tulsa, OK
January 13, 2026; 2:00 p.m., ESPN+		Tulane	L 58–71	7–9 (1–3)	20 – Molina	10 – Molina	3 – Tied	Liacouras Center (1,119); Philadelphia, PA
January 17, 2026; 2:00 p.m., ESPN+		at East Carolina	L 65–81	7–10 (1–4)	17 – Turner	8 – Jacobs	3 – Taylor	Williams Arena (1,027); Greenville, NC
January 20, 2026; 7:00 p.m., ESPN+		South Florida	W 86–83	8–10 (2–4)	23 – Turner	6 – Craig	5 – Taylor	Liacouras Center (1,223); Philadelphia, PA
January 24, 2026; 1:00 p.m., ESPN+		Charlotte	W 83–82	9–10 (3–4)	32 – Taylor	6 – Craig	6 – Taylor	Liacouras Center (1,352); Philadelphia, PA
January 28, 2026; 8:00 p.m., ESPN+		at Rice	L 56–65	9–11 (3–5)	16 – Turner	8 – Molina	4 – Turner	Tudor Fieldhouse (767); Houston, TX
January 31, 2026; 7:30 p.m., ESPN+		at Tulane	W 67–65 ^{OT}	10–11 (4–5)	27 – Turner	13 – Molina	7 – Taylor	Devlin Fieldhouse (729); New Orleans, LA
February 7, 2026; 2:00 p.m., ESPN+		North Texas	L 66–69	10–12 (4–6)	14 – Curry	7 – Turner	4 – Turner	Liacouras Center (1,243); Philadelphia, PA
February 10, 2026; 7:30 p.m., ESPN+		at UTSA	L 43–52	10–13 (4–7)	13 – Craig	11 – Craig	3 – Taylor	Convocation Center (942); San Antonio, TX
February 14, 2026; 2:00 p.m., ESPN+		East Carolina	L 73–79	10–14 (4–8)	20 – Craig	8 – Curry	7 – Taylor	Liacouras Center (1,119); Philadelphia, PA
February 14, 2026; 6:30 p.m., ESPN+		at Charlotte	W 58–54	11–14 (5–8)	21 – Curry	13 – Molina	4 – Taylor	Halton Arena (612); Charlotte, NC
February 22, 2026; 1:00 p.m., ESPN+		Memphis	W 65–62	12–14 (6–8)	17 – Craig	10 – Craig	4 – Mead	Liacouras Center (1,075); Philadelphia, PA
February 25, 2026; 7:00 p.m., ESPN+		Rice	L 66–77	12–15 (6–9)	22 – Turner	11 – Molina	4 – Taylor	Liacouras Center (1,116); Philadelphia, PA
February 28, 2026; 3:00 p.m., ESPN+		at UAB	W 86–57	13–15 (7–9)	26 – Turner	9 – Molina	5 – Turner	Bartow Arena (455); Birmingham, AL
March 3, 2026; 7:00 p.m., ESPN+		South Florida	L 36–82	13–16 (7–10)	11 – Taylor	7 – Tied	3 – Taylor	Yuengling Center (2,551); Tampa, FL
March 7, 2026; 2:00 p.m., ESPN+		Florida Atlantic	W 84–56	14–16 (8–10)	16 – Cedano	9 – Jacobs	4 – Tied	Liacouras Center (1,346); Philadelphia, PA
American tournament
March 10, 2026; 3:00 p.m., ESPN+	(7)	vs. (10) Tulane; First Round	W 86–77 ^{OT}	15–16	31 – Turner	15 – Craig	5 – Craig	Legacy Arena (247); Birmingham, AL
March 11, 2026; 3:00 p.m., ESPN+	(7)	vs. (6) UTSA; First Round	L 51–59	15–17	12 – Tied	6 – Molina	4 – Taylor	Legacy Arena (363); Birmingham, AL
*Non-conference game. ^{#}Rankings from AP Poll. (#) Tournament seedings in parentheses. All times are in Eastern.
