= 2025–26 Tulane Green Wave women's basketball team =

American college basketball season

2025–26 Tulane Green Wave women's basketball
- Conference: American Conference
- Record: 11–20 (6–12 American)
- Head coach: Ashley Langford (2nd season)
- Assistant coaches: Camille Collier; Ke'Sha Blanton; Donnie Stith; Shyan Mwai; Daishai Almond
- Home arena: Devlin Fieldhouse

2025–26 American Conference women's basketball standings
	Conf.				Overall
Team	W		L	PCT	W		L	PCT
Rice	17	–	1	.944	29	–	6	.829
East Carolina	14	–	4	.778	22	–	10	.688
South Florida	13	–	5	.722	20	–	12	.625
Tulsa	11	–	7	.611	19	–	12	.613
North Texas	11	–	7	.611	19	–	14	.576
UTSA †	9	–	9	.500	18	–	16	.529
Temple	8	–	10	.444	15	–	17	.469
Charlotte	8	–	10	.444	14	–	18	.438
Florida Atlantic	7	–	11	.389	14	–	18	.438
Tulane	6	–	12	.333	11	–	20	.355
Wichita State	5	–	13	.278	8	–	23	.258
UAB	4	–	14	.222	11	–	19	.367
Memphis	4	–	14	.222	10	–	21	.323
† 2026 American tournament winner

The 2025–26 Tulane Green Wave women's basketball team represented Tulane University during the 2025–26 NCAA Division I women's basketball season. The Green Wave, led by second-year head coach Ashley Langford, played their home games at Devlin Fieldhouse in New Orleans, Louisiana as members of the American Conference.

== Previous season ==
The Green Wave finished the 2024–25 season 17–13, 9–8 in AAC play to finish in sixth place. They defeated Wichita State in the first round of the AAC tournament before losing in the quarterfinals to South Florida.

== Offseason ==
=== Departures ===
Tulane Departures
Name	Num	Pos.	Height	Year	Hometown	Reason for Departure
Kyren Whittington	0	G	5'9"	(redshirt) Senior	Folsom, LA	Graduated
Victoria Keenan	2	G	5'7"	Graduate Student	Bethlehem, PA	Graduated
Kianni Westbrook	3	F	6'3"	Graduate Student	Augusta, GA	Graduated
Karma Wynn	7	G	5'4"	Freshman	Birmingham, AL	Transferred to Wallace State (NJCAA)
Ana Baker	12	G	6'1"	Freshman	Austin, TX	TBD; not listed on roster
Sherese Pittman	22	F	6'2"	Senior	Richmond, VA	Graduated
Kierra Middleton	24	G	5'7"	Senior	Arlington, TX	Transferred to Louisiana Tech
Lily Ba	33	F	6'3"	Sophomore	Overland Park, KS	Transferred to Louisiana

=== Incoming transfers ===
Tulane incoming transfers
Name	Num	Pos.	Height	Year	Hometown	Previous School
Jordyn Weaver	0	F	5'11"	Graduate Student	San Antonio, TX	Queens (NC)
Tamiah Robinson	2	G	5'9"	Graduate Student	Philadelphia, PA	Louisiana
CC Mays	3	G	5'8"	Senior	Tampa, FL	Marshall
Jayda Brown	11	G	6'0"	Junior	Atlanta, GA	St. John's
Kanija Daniel	21	G	5'10"	Junior	Carrollton, GA	Chipola College

==== Recruiting ====
There was no recruiting class for the class of 2025.

== Roster ==
2025–26 Tulane Green Wave women's basketball team
Players
Coaches

Pos.	#	Name	Height	Year	Previous school	Hometown
F	0	Jordyn Weaver	5 ft 11 in (1.8 m)	GS	Queens (NC)	San Antonio, TX
G	1	Kayla Hampton	5 ft 9 in (1.75 m)	Sr	Kilgore College	Bossier City, LA
G	2	Tamiah Robinson	5 ft 9 in (1.75 m)	GS	Louisiana	Philadelphia, PA
G	3	CC Mays	5 ft 8 in (1.73 m)	Sr	Marshall	Tampa, FL
G	5	Jaylee Womack	5 ft 10 in (1.78 m)	RS Jr	Ponchatoula High School	Springfield, LA
G	8	Mecailin Marshall	5 ft 10 in (1.78 m)	Fr	Abernathy High School	Abernathy, TX
G	9	Kendall Sneed	5 ft 8 in (1.73 m)	So	Hardin-Jefferson High School	China, TX
G	11	Jayda Brown	6 ft 0 in (1.83 m)	Jr	St. John's	Atlanta, GA
G	21	Kanija Daniel	5 ft 10 in (1.78 m)	Jr	Chipola College	Carrollton, GA
F	22	Dyllan Hanna	6 ft 2 in (1.88 m)	Sr	Florida Atlantic	St. Augustine, FL
F	23	Amira Mabry	6 ft 0 in (1.83 m)	Sr	Judson High School	Converse, TX
G	24	Shiloh Kimpson	5 ft 6 in (1.68 m)	Fr	Little Elm High School	Little Elm, TX
F	32	Madison Gordon	6 ft 2 in (1.88 m)	Fr	Bishop O'Dowd High School	Oakland, CA
G	33	Sadie Shores	5 ft 10 in (1.78 m)	So	Woodgrove High School	Purcellville, VA

Head coach

- Ashley Langford (Tulane)

Assistant coach(es)

- Camille Collier (Wake Forest)
- Ke'Sha Blanton (Toledo)
- Donnie Stith (Tulane)
- Shyan Mwai (LIU)
- Daishai Almond (Stony Brook)

Legend

- (C) Team captain
- (S) Suspended
- (I) Ineligible
- (W) Walk-on
- Injured
- Current redshirt

Roster

== Schedule and results ==
Date time, TV	Rank^{#}	Opponent^{#}	Result	Record	High points	High rebounds	High assists	Site (attendance) city, state
Exhibition
October 29, 2025*; 6:30 p.m.		Loyola (New Orleans)	W 80–53		–	–	–	Devlin Fieldhouse; New Orleans, LA
Non-conference regular season
November 3, 2025*; 4:00 p.m., ESPN+		Campbell	W 74–72	1–0	19 – Mabry	5 – Tied	5 – Tied	Devlin Fieldhouse (1,181); New Orleans, LA
November 6, 2025*; 6:30 p.m., ESPN+		Missouri	L 69–77	1–1	17 – Mays	10 – Mabry	6 – Sneed	Devlin Fieldhouse (879); New Orleans, LA
November 12, 2025*; 11:00 a.m., ESPN+		North Florida	W 77–54	2–1	20 – Daniel	9 – Weaver	3 – Mabry	Devlin Fieldhouse (852); New Orleans, LA
November 17, 2025*; 6:00 p.m., ESPNU		No. 5 LSU	L 71–101	2–2	20 – Marshall	12 – Hanna	6 – Robinson	Devlin Fieldhouse (3,621); New Orleans, LA
November 21, 2025*; 7:00 p.m., SLN		at North Dakota State	L 72−83	2−3	25 – Daniel	7 – Robinson	5 – Robinson	Scheels Center (1,007); Fargo, ND
November 27, 2025*; 11:30 a.m., ESPN+		vs. Elon; Paradise Jam Harbor Division semifinals	W 63–61	3–3	17 – Marshall	8 – Tied	3 – Tied	Sports and Fitness Center; St. Thomas, USVI
November 28, 2025*; 2:00 p.m., ESPN+		vs. Boise State; Paradise Jam Harbor Division championship	L 76–81	3–4	21 – Marshall	8 – Hanna	9 – Sneed	Sports and Fitness Center (133); St. Thomas, USVI
December 4, 2025*; 6:30 p.m., ESPN+		Missouri State	L 66–72	3–5	14 – Mabry	6 – Robinson	7 – Mays	Devlin Fieldhouse (657); New Orleans, LA
December 14, 2025*; 2:00 p.m., ESPN+		New Orleans	W 95−71	4−5	18 – Sneed	10 – Mays	5 – Sneed	Devlin Fieldhouse (664); New Orleans, LA
December 17, 2025*; 4:00 p.m., SECN+/ESPN+		at Alabama	L 52−81	4−6	12 – Mays	9 – Hanna	4 – Sneed	Coleman Coliseum (2,169); Tuscaloosa, AL
December 20, 2025*; 12:00 p.m., ESPN+		Delaware State; Tulane Holiday Tournament semifinals	W 76−44	5−6	12 – Tied	11 – Mabry	4 – Tied	Devlin Fieldhouse (691); New Orleans, LA
December 21, 2025*; 1:30 p.m., ESPN+		Mercer; Tulane Holiday Tournament championship	L 67−70 ^{OT}	5−7	15 – Sneed	14 – Mabry	5 – Daniel	Devlin Fieldhouse (600); New Orleans, LA
American regular season
December 30, 2025; 1:00 p.m., ESPN+		at UTSA	L 63−65	5−8 (0−1)	12 – Daniel	6 – Sneed	6 – Sneed	Convocation Center (685); San Antonio, TX
January 3, 2026; 2:00 p.m., ESPN+		at Wichita State	W 70−60	6−8 (1−1)	14 – Tied	6 – Tied	6 – Sneed	Charles Koch Arena (831); Wichita, KS
January 6, 2026; 6:30 p.m., ESPN+		Tulsa	L 73−76	6−9 (1−2)	16 – Daniel	10 – Brown	7 – Sneed	Devlin Fieldhouse (614); New Orleans, LA
January 10, 2026; 6:30 p.m., ESPN+		North Texas	L 53−59	6−10 (1−3)	20 – Marshall	10 – Marshall	4 – Sneed	Devlin Fieldhouse (704); New Orleans, LA
January 13, 2026; 6:00 p.m., ESPN+		at Temple	W 71−58	7−10 (2−3)	19 – Daniel	10 – Hanna	7 – Sneed	Liacouras Center (1,119); Philadelphia, PA
January 17, 2026; 2:00 p.m., ESPN+		UAB	W 73–68	8–10 (3–3)	13 – Mabry	10 – Hanna	5 – Kimpson	Devlin Fieldhouse (636); New Orleans, LA
January 24, 2026; 6:30 p.m., ESPN+		at Rice	L 60−70	8−11 (3−4)	17 – Daniel	6 – Sneed	3 – Kimpson	Tudor Fieldhouse (1,282); Houston, TX
January 27, 2026; 7:00 p.m., ESPN+		at Memphis	Postponed due to inclement weather					Elma Roane Fieldhouse; Memphis, TN
January 31, 2026; 2:00 p.m., ESPN+		Temple	L 65–67 ^{OT}	8–12 (3–5)	23 – Hanna	5 – Hanna	8 – Daniel	Devlin Fieldhouse (729); New Orleans, LA
February 4, 2026; 6:30 p.m., ESPN+		Charlotte	L 44–47	8–13 (3–6)	14 – Tied	6 – Tied	4 – Kimpson	Devlin Fieldhouse (731); New Orleans, LA
February 7, 2026; 6:00 p.m., ESPN+		at South Florida	L 53–85	8–14 (3–7)	19 – Daniel	7 – Mays	3 – Sneed	Yuengling Center (2,918); Tampa, FL
February 10, 2026; 6:30 p.m., ESPN+		East Carolina	L 61–65	8–15 (3–8)	34 – Marshall	12 – Hanna	9 – Sneed	Devlin Fieldhouse (638); New Orleans, LA
February 14, 2026; 2:00 p.m., ESPN+		at North Texas	L 47–56	8–16 (3–9)	11 – Daniel	5 – Hanna	2 – Tied	The Super Pit (1,555); Denton, TX
February 17, 2026; 7:00 p.m., ESPN+		at Memphis; Rescheduled from Jan. 27	W 63–58	9–16 (4–9)	13 – Mabry	5 – Tied	7 – Kimpson	Elma Roane Fieldhouse (554); Memphis, TN
February 19, 2026; 6:30 p.m., ESPN+		Memphis	W 69–54	10–16 (5–9)	15 – Marshall	12 – Hanna	10 – Kimpson	Devlin Fieldhouse (751); New Orleans, LA
February 24, 2026; 6:30 p.m., ESPN+		at Tulsa	L 46–65	10–17 (5–10)	12 – Tied	8 – Hanna	3 – Brown	Reynolds Center (1,185); Tulsa, OK
February 28, 2026; 2:00 p.m., ESPN+		Wichita State	W 62–54	11–17 (6–10)	20 – Daniel	8 – Mabry	3 – Tied	Devlin Fieldhouse (820); New Orleans, LA
March 3, 2026; 6:00 p.m., ESPN+		at Florida Atlantic	L 57−61	11−18 (6−11)	21 – Daniel	9 – Hanna	5 – Kimpson	Eleanor R. Baldwin Arena (665); Boca Raton, FL
March 7, 2026; 2:00 p.m., ESPN+		South Florida	L 49–58	11–19 (6–12)	18 – Marshall	11 – Marshall	3 – Tied	Devlin Fieldhouse (849); New Orleans, LA
American tournament
March 10, 2026; 2:30 p.m., ESPN+	(10)	vs. (7) Temple; First Round	L 77–86 ^{OT}	11–20	25 – Marshall	7 – Brown	4 – Tied	Legacy Arena (247); Birmingham, AL
*Non-conference game. ^{#}Rankings from AP Poll. (#) Tournament seedings in parentheses. All times are in Central.
