= 2025–26 Rice Owls women's basketball team =

American college basketball season

2025–26 Rice Owls women's basketball

American regular season champions

WBIT, Second Round
- Conference: American Conference
- Record: 29–6 (17–1 American)
- Head coach: Lindsay Edmonds (5th season)
- Assistant coaches: Lakevia Boykin; Nick Grant; Danyelle Grant; Jalen Latta; Madi Miller
- Home arena: Tudor Fieldhouse

2025–26 American Conference women's basketball standings
| | Conf. | | | | Overall |
| Team | W | | L | PCT | W | | L | PCT |
|---|---|---|---|---|---|---|---|---|
| Rice | 17 | – | 1 | .944 | 29 | – | 6 | .829 |
| East Carolina | 14 | – | 4 | .778 | 22 | – | 10 | .688 |
| South Florida | 13 | – | 5 | .722 | 20 | – | 12 | .625 |
| Tulsa | 11 | – | 7 | .611 | 19 | – | 12 | .613 |
| North Texas | 11 | – | 7 | .611 | 19 | – | 14 | .576 |
| UTSA † | 9 | – | 9 | .500 | 18 | – | 16 | .529 |
| Temple | 8 | – | 10 | .444 | 15 | – | 17 | .469 |
| Charlotte | 8 | – | 10 | .444 | 14 | – | 18 | .438 |
| Florida Atlantic | 7 | – | 11 | .389 | 14 | – | 18 | .438 |
| Tulane | 6 | – | 12 | .333 | 11 | – | 20 | .355 |
| Wichita State | 5 | – | 13 | .278 | 8 | – | 23 | .258 |
| UAB | 4 | – | 14 | .222 | 11 | – | 19 | .367 |
| Memphis | 4 | – | 14 | .222 | 10 | – | 21 | .323 |
† 2026 American tournament winner

The 2025–26 Rice Owls women's basketball team represented Rice University during the 2025–26 NCAA Division I women's basketball season. The Owls, led by fifth-year head coach Lindsay Edmonds, played their home games at Tudor Fieldhouse in Houston, Texas as second-year members of the American Conference.

== Previous season ==
The Owls finished the season 17–17 and 7–11 in AAC play to clinch the No. 9 seed in the AAC tournament. They beat No. 8 UAB in the second round before upsetting No. 1 seed UTSA in the quarterfinals and No. 4 Temple in the semifinals. They lost to No. 3 South Florida 62–69 in the championship game, their second appearance in program history.

== Offseason ==
=== Departures ===
Rice departures
| Name | Num | Pos. | Height | Year | Hometown | Reason for departure |
|---|---|---|---|---|---|---|
| Malia Fisher | 1 | F | 6'2" | Senior | Dacula, GA | Graduated |
| Emily Klaczek | 2 | G | 5'8" | Senior | Hoffman Estates, IL | Graduated |
| Maya Bokunewicz | 14 | G | 6'0" | Senior | State College, PA | Graduated |
| Jazzy Owens-Barnett | 30 | G | 5'7" | Junior | Plano, TX | Transferred to North Texas |
| Trinity Gooden | 32 | G | 5'10" | Senior | Midwest City, OK | Graduated |
| Sussy Ngulefac | 35 | C | 6'4" | Senior | Lilburn, GA | Graduated |

=== Incoming transfers ===
Rice incoming transfers
| Name | Num | Pos. | Height | Year | Hometown | Previous school |
|---|---|---|---|---|---|---|
| Louann Battiston | 7 | G | 5'5" | Junior | Montigny-le-Tilleul, Belgium | Duke |
| Myah Hazelton | 21 | C | 6'4" | Sophomore | Baltimore, MD | Virginia Tech |

=== Recruiting class ===
There was no recruiting class for the class of 2025.

== Roster ==
2025–26 Rice Owls women's basketball team
Players
Coaches

| Pos. | # | Name | Height | Year | Previous school | Hometown |
|---|---|---|---|---|---|---|
| G | 3 | Jill Twiehaus | 5 ft 10 in (1.78 m) | So | Jenks High School | Tulsa, OK |
| G | 4 | Pace Rickard | 5 ft 6 in (1.68 m) | Jr | Grand Rapids Christian High School | Grand Rapids, MI |
| G | 5 | Mylee Guinn | 5 ft 11 in (1.8 m) | Fr | Prestonwood Christian Academy | Frisco, TX |
| G | 7 | Louann Battiston | 5 ft 5 in (1.65 m) | Jr | Duke | Montigny-le-Tilleul, Belgium |
| G | 10 | Jordan Blackman | 5 ft 10 in (1.78 m) | Fr | Bishop Montgomery High School | Inglewood, CA |
| G | 11 | Dominique Ennis | 5 ft 9 in (1.75 m) | Sr | King's Christian Collegiate | Fort Erie, Ontario |
| G | 12 | Layla Conley | 5 ft 8 in (1.73 m) | Jr | John Marshall Harlan High School | San Antonio, TX |
| G | 14 | Skyla Tuthill | 5 ft 11 in (1.8 m) | Fr | Ashley Ridge High School | Summerville, SC |
| C | 21 | Myah Hazleton | 6 ft 4 in (1.93 m) | So | Sparrows Point High School; Virginia Tech | Baltimore, MD |
| G | 22 | Hailey Adams | 6 ft 1 in (1.85 m) | RS Jr | Tom C. Clark High School | San Antonio, TX |
| G/F | 23 | Kennedy Clifton | 6 ft 0 in (1.83 m) | Sr | Bishop Ireton High School | Upper Marlboro, MD |
| G | 24 | Aniah Alexis | 6 ft 1 in (1.85 m) | So | Cypress Lakes High School | Waller, TX |
| C | 34 | Hanna Hilberth | 6 ft 4 in (1.93 m) | Fr | Lulea Gymansieskolor | Stockholm, Sweden |
| C | 44 | Shelby Hayes | 6 ft 2 in (1.88 m) | Sr | Cedar Park High School | Cedar Park, TX |
| G | 55 | Victoria Flores | 5 ft 7 in (1.7 m) | Jr | Duncanville High School; TCU | West Dallas, TX |

Head coach

- Lindsay Edmonds (Appalachian State)

Assistant coach(es)

- Lakevia Boykin (Wake Forest)
- Nick Grant (Baylor)
- Danyelle Grant (Utah State)
- Jalen Latta (Western New England)
- Madi Miller (Abilene Christian)

Legend

- (C) Team captain
- (S) Suspended
- (I) Ineligible
- (W) Walk-on
- Injured
- Current redshirt

Roster

== Schedule and results ==
| Date time, TV | Rank^{#} | Opponent^{#} | Result | Record | High points | High rebounds | High assists | Site (attendance) city, state |
Exhibition
| October 28, 2025*; 7:00 p.m. | | Mary Hardin-Baylor | W 102–35 | | – | – | – | |
Non-conference regular season
| November 7, 2025*; 7:00 p.m., ESPN+ | | at South Dakota State | L 65–79 | 0–1 | 17 – Ennis | 11 – Adams | 2 – Tied | First Bank & Trust Arena (2,151); Brookings, SD |
| November 11, 2025*; 6:30 p.m., ESPN+ | | at Houston | W 70–56 | 1–1 | 16 – Tied | 13 – Adams | 4 – Battiston | Fertitta Center (1,104); Houston, TX |
| November 15, 2025*; 2:00 p.m., ESPN+ | | Middle Tennessee | W 66–59 | 2–1 | 18 – Alexis | 10 – Alexis | 6 – Adams | Tudor Fieldhouse (738); Houston, TX |
| November 19, 2025*; 6:00 p.m., ESPN+ | | at Princeton | L 56–69 | 2–2 | 10 – Tied | 7 – Tied | 5 – Battiston | Jadwin Gymnasium (657); Princeton, NJ |
| November 23, 2025*; 2:00 p.m., ESPN+ | | Incarnate Word | W 70–62 | 3–2 | 19 – Ennis | 13 – Adams | 4 – Alexis | Tudor Fieldhouse (751); Houston, TX |
| November 26, 2025; 11:30 a.m., FloCollege | | vs. Illinois State; Discover Puerto Rico Shootout | W 75–72 ^{OT} | 4–2 | 23 – Tied | 15 – Hayes | 4 – Adams | Coliseo Guillermo Angulo (250); San Juan, PR |
| November 27, 2025; 4:30 p.m., FloCollege | | vs. Morgan State; Discover Puerto Rico Shootout | W 75–44 | 5–2 | 13 – Adams | 11 – Adams | 3 – Adams | Coliseo Guillermo Angulo (250); San Juan, PR |
| November 28, 2025; 2:00 p.m., FloCollege | | vs. UCF; Discover Puerto Rico Shootout | L 56–57 | 5–3 | 17 – Hayes | 13 – Adams | 3 – Adams | Coliseo Guillermo Angulo (250); San Juan, PR |
| December 3, 2025*; 5:30 p.m., ESPN+ | | Sam Houston | W 66–50 | 6–3 | 13 – Ennis | 12 – Adams | 4 – Adams | Tudor Fieldhouse (765); Houston, TX |
| December 6, 2025*; 2:00 p.m., ESPN+ | | UNLV | W 75–50 | 7–3 | 20 – Ennis | 10 – Adams | 8 – Flores | Tudor Fieldhouse (703); Houston, TX |
| December 12, 2025*; 11:15 a.m., ESPN+ | | UT Arlington | W 75–54 | 8–3 | 17 – Alexis | 11 – Adams | 6 – Adams | Tudor Fieldhouse (1,044); Houston, TX |
| December 17, 2025*; 2:00 p.m., ESPN+ | | at Grambling State | W 71–47 | 9–3 | 14 – Battiston | 10 – Alexis | 5 – Adams | Fredrick C. Hobdy Assembly Center (103); Grambling, LA |
| December 20, 2025*; 2:00 p.m., ESPN+ | | Houston Christian | W 71–47 | 10–3 | 18 – Hayes | 13 – Adams | 3 – Tied | Tudor Fieldhouse (661); Houston, TX |
American regular season
| December 30, 2025; 6:00 p.m., ESPN+ | | at South Florida | W 70–68 | 11–3 (1–0) | 19 – Alexis | 11 – Adams | 4 – Adams | Yuengling Center (2,105); Tampa, FL |
| January 3, 2026; 1:00 p.m., ESPN+ | | at Florida Atlantic | W 83–75 | 12–3 (2–0) | 19 – Alexis | 11 – Adams | 4 – Adams | Eleanor R. Baldwin Arena (2,105); Boca Raton, FL |
| January 7, 2026; 7:00 p.m., ESPN+ | | Charlotte | W 84–59 | 13–3 (3–0) | 20 – Tied | 13 – Adams | 4 – Adams | Tudor Fieldhouse (619); Houston, TX |
| January 14, 2026; 7:00 p.m., ESPN+ | | UAB | W 76–56 | 14–3 (4–0) | 19 – Ennis | 13 – Adams | 7 – Adams | Tudor Fieldhouse (885); Houston, TX |
| January 17, 2026; 2:00 p.m., ESPN+ | | at North Texas | W 58–54 | 15–3 (5–0) | 16 – Flores | 6 – Tied | 2 – Tied | The Super Pit (1,784); Denton, TX |
| January 20, 2026; 6:30 p.m., ESPN+ | | at Tulsa | W 78–66 | 16–3 (6–0) | 26 – Ennis | 15 – Adams | 5 – Flores | Donald W. Reynolds Center (1,238); Tulsa, OK |
| January 24, 2026; 2:00 p.m., ESPN+ | | Tulane | W 70−60 | 17−3 (7−0) | 16 – Hayes | 12 – Alexis | 5 – Tied | Tudor Fieldhouse (1,282); Houston, TX |
| January 28, 2026; 7:00 p.m., ESPN+ | | Temple | W 65–56 | 18–3 (8–0) | 18 – Hayes | 15 – Adams | 6 – Battiston | Tudor Fieldhouse (767); Houston, TX |
| January 31, 2026; 1:00 p.m., ESPN+ | | at UTSA | W 65–55 | 19–3 (9–0) | 33 – Flores | 15 – Adams | 3 – Adams | Convocation Center (1,172); San Antonio, TX |
| February 7, 2026; 1:00 p.m., ESPN+ | | at Memphis | W 82–65 | 20–3 (10–0) | 22 – Ennis | 12 – Adams | 5 – Flores | Elma Roane Fieldhouse (1,204); Memphis, TN |
| February 10, 2026; 8:00 p.m., ESPNU | | North Texas | W 70–68 | 21–3 (11–0) | 16 – Alexis | 8 – Adams | 5 – Flores | Tudor Fieldhouse (1,142); Houston, TX |
| February 13, 2026; 7:00 p.m., ESPN+ | | Wichita State | W 80–42 | 22–3 (12–0) | 18 – Ennis | 17 – Adams | 6 – Adams | Tudor Fieldhouse (1,088); Houston, TX |
| February 17, 2026; 7:00 p.m., ESPN+ | | South Florida | W 79–72 | 23–3 (13–0) | 24 – Flores | 13 – Adams | 3 – Tied | Tudor Fieldhouse (1,011); Houston, TX |
| February 21, 2026; 12:00 p.m., ESPN+ | | at East Carolina | W 60–58 | 24–3 (14–0) | 16 – Ennis | 19 – Adams | 3 – Battiston | Minges Coliseum (1,882); Greenville, NC |
| February 25, 2026; 6:00 p.m., ESPN+ | | at Temple | W 77–66 | 25–3 (15–0) | 21 – Ennis | 4 – Ennis | 8 – Flores | Liacouras Center (1,116); Philadelphia, PA |
| February 28, 2026; 1:00 p.m., ESPN+ | | Tulsa | W 105–65 | 26–3 (16–0) | 24 – Flores | 7 – Tied | 5 – Battiston | Tudor Fieldhouse (1,365); Houston, TX |
| March 3, 2026; 5:30 p.m., ESPN+ | | at Charlotte | W 63–56 | 27–3 (17–0) | 23 – Ennis | 13 – Hayes | 2 – Tied | Halton Arena (577); Charlotte, NC |
| March 7, 2026; 2:00 p.m., ESPN+ | | UTSA | L 52–61 | 27–4 (17–1) | 15 – Alexis | 6 – Adams | 5 – Battiston | Tudor Fieldhouse (1,346); Houston, TX |
American tournament
| March 13, 2026; 6:00 p.m., ESPN+ | (1) | vs. (5) North Texas; Semifinals | W 71–67 | 28–4 | 21 – Flores | 14 – Adams | 4 – Tied | Legacy Arena; Birmingham, AL |
| March 14, 2026; 8:30 p.m., ESPN+ | (1) | vs. (6) UTSA; Championship | L 40–54 | 28–5 | 12 – Adams | 12 – Adams | 3 – Ennis | Legacy Arena; Birmingham, AL |
WBIT
| March 19, 2026*; 8:00 p.m., ESPN+ | (3) | Louisiana Tech; First Round | W 66–61 | 29–5 | 21 – Battiston | 8 – Tied | 9 – Adams | Tudor Fieldhouse (325); Houston, TX |
| March 22, 2026*; 6:30 p.m., ESPN+ | (3) | at (2) Kansas; Second Round | L 55–62 | 29–6 | 13 – Battiston | 10 – Adams | 4 – Battiston | Allen Fieldhouse (878); Lawrence, KS |
*Non-conference game. ^{#}Rankings from AP Poll. (#) Tournament seedings in parentheses. All times are in Central Time.

== Rankings ==
Ranking movements Legend: ██ Increase in ranking ██ Decrease in ranking — = Not ranked RV = Received votes
| | Week | | | | | | | | | | | | | | | | | | | | |
| Poll | Pre | 1 | 2 | 3 | 4 | 5 | 6 | 7 | 8 | 9 | 10 | 11 | 12 | 13 | 14 | 15 | 16 | 17 | 18 | 19 | Final |
|---|---|---|---|---|---|---|---|---|---|---|---|---|---|---|---|---|---|---|---|---|---|
| AP | — | — | — | — | — | — | — | — | — | — | — | — | — | — | — | — | RV | RV | — | — | |
| Coaches | — | — | — | — | — | — | — | — | — | — | — | — | — | — | — | RV | RV | RV | RV | RV | |
