= 2025–26 UAB Blazers women's basketball team =

American college basketball season

2025–26 UAB Blazers women's basketball
- Conference: American Conference
- Record: 11–19 (4–14 American)
- Head coach: Randy Norton (13th season)
- Associate head coach: Taren Martin
- Assistant coaches: Ty Margenthaler; Brooke LeMar; Hunter Simpson; Miyah Barnes
- Home arena: Bartow Arena

2025–26 American Conference women's basketball standings
| | Conf. | | | | Overall |
| Team | W | | L | PCT | W | | L | PCT |
|---|---|---|---|---|---|---|---|---|
| Rice | 17 | – | 1 | .944 | 29 | – | 6 | .829 |
| East Carolina | 14 | – | 4 | .778 | 22 | – | 10 | .688 |
| South Florida | 13 | – | 5 | .722 | 20 | – | 12 | .625 |
| Tulsa | 11 | – | 7 | .611 | 19 | – | 12 | .613 |
| North Texas | 11 | – | 7 | .611 | 19 | – | 14 | .576 |
| UTSA † | 9 | – | 9 | .500 | 18 | – | 16 | .529 |
| Temple | 8 | – | 10 | .444 | 15 | – | 17 | .469 |
| Charlotte | 8 | – | 10 | .444 | 14 | – | 18 | .438 |
| Florida Atlantic | 7 | – | 11 | .389 | 14 | – | 18 | .438 |
| Tulane | 6 | – | 12 | .333 | 11 | – | 20 | .355 |
| Wichita State | 5 | – | 13 | .278 | 8 | – | 23 | .258 |
| UAB | 4 | – | 14 | .222 | 11 | – | 19 | .367 |
| Memphis | 4 | – | 14 | .222 | 10 | – | 21 | .323 |
† 2026 American tournament winner

The 2025–26 UAB Blazers women's basketball team represented the University of Alabama at Birmingham during the 2025–26 NCAA Division I women's basketball season. The Blazers, led by 13th-year head coach Randy Norton, played their home games at the Bartow Arena in Birmingham, Alabama as second-year members of the American Conference.

== Previous season ==
The Blazers finished the 2024–25 season 16–16 and 7–11 in AAC play to clinch the No. 8 seed in the AAC tournament. They lost to eventual tournament finalists No. 9 Rice in the second round.

Following the loss, they received an at-large bid to the 2025 WNIT, where they lost in the first round to UIC.

== Offseason ==
=== Departures ===
UAB departures
| Name | Num | Pos. | Height | Year | Hometown | Reason for departure |
|---|---|---|---|---|---|---|
| Rayne Tucker | 0 | F | 6'1" | Graduate student | New Carrollton, MD | Graduated |
| Desiree Ware | 4 | G | 5'8" | Junior | Brooklyn Park, MN | TBD; entered transfer portal |
| Genevieve Wedemeyer | 11 | G | 5'8" | Sophomore | Hamburg, Germany | Transferred to Siena |
| Valentina Monzo | 13 | F | 6'2" | Senior | Santiago, Chile | Graduated |
| Maddie Walsh | 21 | G | 6'2" | Graduate student | Hartland, WI | Graduated |
| Ashton Elley | 22 | G | 5'10" | Junior | Little Rock, AR | Transferred to Miami (OH) |
| Jade Weathersby | 23 | F | 6'2" | Sophomore | Aurora, CO | Transferred to Florida |
| Tracey Bershers | 24 | F | 6'2" | Junior | Fort Smith, AR | Transferred to Minnesota |
| Sara Bershers | 33 | F | 6'0" | Graduate student | Fort Smith, AR | Graduated |

=== Incoming transfers ===
UAB incoming transfers
| Name | Num | Pos. | Height | Year | Hometown | Previous school |
|---|---|---|---|---|---|---|
| Samari Taylor | 13 | F | 6'3" | Junior | Louisville, KY | Three Rivers CC (NJCAA) |
| Monae' Duffy | 14 | F | 5'10" | Senior | Lafayette, LA | Texas A&M–Corpus Christi |
| Lika Kvirkvelia | 21 | F | 6'4" | RS sophomore | Kobuleti, Georgia | Xavier |
| Jordan Rosier | 24 | G | 5'9" | Graduate student | Tallahassee, FL | South Alabama |

=== Recruiting class ===
There was no recruiting class for 2025.

== Roster ==
2025–26 UAB Blazers women's basketball team
Players
Coaches

| Pos. | # | Name | Height | Year | Previous school | Hometown |
|---|---|---|---|---|---|---|
| G | 1 | Eleecia Carter | 5 ft 7 in (1.7 m) | RS So | Lake Highland Prep; Chattanooga | Winter Garden, FL |
| G | 3 | Journey Armstead | 5 ft 8 in (1.73 m) | Sr | Charles Page High School; Hutchinson Community College | Tulsa, OK |
| G | 10 | Riley Talbert | 5 ft 10 in (1.78 m) | RS Fr | Bishop Kenny High School | Amelia Island, FL |
| G | 11 | Peyton Musial | 5 ft 11 in (1.8 m) | Fr | Notre Dame Academy | De Pere, WI |
| F | 12 | Molly Moffitt | 6 ft 1 in (1.85 m) | Sr | Putnam Science Academy | Seattle, WA |
| F | 13 | Samari Taylor | 6 ft 3 in (1.91 m) | Jr | Ballard High School; Three Rivers CC | Louisville, KY |
| F | 14 | Monae' Duffy | 5 ft 10 in (1.78 m) | Sr | Lafayette Christian Academy; Hutchinson CC; Texas A&M–Corpus Christi | Lafayette, LA |
| G | 20 | Sofia Munoz | 5 ft 8 in (1.73 m) | Fr | Lake Highland Prep | Canovanas, PR |
| F | 21 | Lika Kvirkvelia | 6 ft 4 in (1.93 m) | RS So | Tbilisi Public School; Xavier | Kobuleti, Georgia |
| G | 23 | Cali Smallwood | 5 ft 9 in (1.75 m) | Jr | Susan Moore High School; Montevallo | Blountsville, AL |
| G | 24 | Jordan Rosier | 5 ft 9 in (1.75 m) | GS | Florida State University Schools; South Alabama | Tallahassee, FL |
| F | 30 | Ashlyn Howard | 6 ft 1 in (1.85 m) | Fr | Hewitt-Trussville High School | Trussville, AL |
| G | 31 | Mari Miller | 5 ft 11 in (1.8 m) | Fr | Rock Bridge High School | Columbia, MO |

Head coach

- Randy Norton (Iowa)

Assistant coach(es)

- Ty Margenthaler (SIU Edwardsville)
- Brook LeMar (North Dakota State)
- Hunter Simpson (UAB)

Legend

- (C) Team captain
- (S) Suspended
- (I) Ineligible
- (W) Walk-on
- Injured
- Current redshirt

Roster

== Schedule and results ==
| Date time, TV | Rank^{#} | Opponent^{#} | Result | Record | High points | High rebounds | High assists | Site (attendance) city, state |
Non-conference regular season
| November 3, 2025*; 12:00 pm, ESPN+ | | West Alabama | L 59–62 | 0–1 | 12 – Tied | 9 – Moffitt | 5 – Munoz | Bartow Arena (234); Birmingham, AL |
| November 8, 2025*; 2:00 pm, ESPN+ | | South Alabama | L 68–91 | 0–2 | 20 – Munoz | 8 – Talbert | 5 – Carter | Bartow Arena (315); Birmingham, AL |
| November 12, 2025*; 6:00 pm, ESPN+ | | Alabama A&M | W 74–67 | 1–2 | 29 – Smallwood | 6 – Duffy | 8 – Munoz | Bartow Arena (1,065); Birmingham, AL |
| November 16, 2025*; 1:00 pm, ESPN+ | | at Chattanooga | W 79–66 | 2–2 | 25 – Carter | 12 – Duffy | 5 – Munoz | McKenzie Arena (1,347); Chattanooga, TN |
| November 22, 2025*; 2:00 pm, ESPN+ | | at Murray State | L 79–91 | 2–3 | 26 – Duffy | 12 – Duffy | 8 – Armstead | CFSB Center (1,612); Murray, KY |
| November 27, 2025*; 5:30 pm, FloHoops | | vs. Southern Miss; Cancún Challenge Yucatan Tournament | W 77–72 | 3–3 | 21 – Carter | 7 – Carter | 10 – Munoz | Hard Rock Hotel Riviera Maya (100); Cancún, Mexico |
| November 26, 2024*; 11:00 am, FloHoops | | vs. No. 8 TCU; Cancún Challenge Yucatan Tournament | L 61–82 | 3–4 | 17 – Carter | 6 – Tied | 6 – Munoz | Hard Rock Hotel Riviera Maya; Cancún, Mexico |
| December 3, 2025*; 11:00 am, ESPN+ | | Southern Illinois | W 81–54 | 4–4 | 25 – Moffitt | 8 – Munoz | 9 – Armstead | Bartow Arena (703); Birmingham, AL |
| December 7, 2025*; 2:00 pm, ESPN+ | | at Southern Miss | L 73–81 | 4–5 | 24 – Munoz | 12 – Duffy | 5 – Armstead | Reed Green Coliseum (1,576); Hattiesburg, MS |
| December 15, 2025*; 6:00 pm, ESPN+ | | Alcorn State | W 70–32 | 5–5 | 18 – Smallwood | 9 – Tied | 7 – Armstead | Bartow Arena (125); Birmingham, AL |
| December 20, 2025*; 2:00 pm, ESPN+ | | Mississippi Valley State | W 86–62 | 6–5 | 15 – Moffitt | 8 – Tied | 3 – Tied | Bartow Arena (245); Birmingham, AL |
| December 22, 2025*; 11:00 am, ESPN+ | | Samford | W 65–49 | 7–5 | 14 – Moffitt | 8 – Duffy | 6 – Carter | Bartow Arena (356); Birmingham, AL |
American regular season
| December 30, 2025; 5:00 pm, ESPN+ | | at East Carolina | L 87–88 ^{OT} | 7–6 (0–1) | 22 – Duffy | 19 – Duffy | 11 – Armstead | Williams Arena (760); Greenville, NC |
| January 3, 2026; 2:00 pm, ESPN+ | | at Charlotte | L 60–71 | 7–7 (0–2) | 20 – Moffitt | 8 – Moffitt | 6 – Armstead | Dale F. Halton Arena (667); Charlotte, NC |
| January 6, 2026; 6:00 pm, ESPN+ | | South Florida | L 65–70 | 7–8 (0–3) | 20 – Smallwood | 13 – Duffy | 3 – Carter | Bartow Arena (206); Birmingham, AL |
| January 10, 2026; 2:00 pm, ESPN+ | | Florida Atlantic | L 63–70 | 7–9 (0–4) | 16 – Munoz | 9 – Moffitt | 3 – Tied | Bartow Arena (287); Birmingham, AL |
| January 14, 2026; 7:00 pm, ESPN+ | | at Rice | L 56–76 | 7–10 (0–5) | 13 – Duffy | 6 – Duffy | 5 – Munoz | Tudor Fieldhouse (885); Houston, TX |
| January 17, 2026; 2:00 pm, ESPN+ | | at Tulane | L 68–73 | 7–11 (0–6) | 17 – Smallwood | 6 – Moffitt | 5 – Tied | Devlin Fieldhouse (636); New Orleans, LA |
| January 20, 2026; 6:00 pm, ESPN+ | | North Texas | L 59–72 | 7–12 (0–7) | 21 – Smallwood | 6 – Tied | 3 – Tied | Bartow Arena (247); Birmingham, AL |
| January 24, 2026; 11:00 am, ESPN+ | | East Carolina | L 61–87 | 7–13 (0–8) | 19 – Munoz | 12 – Duffy | 5 – Armstead | Bartow Arena (310); Birmingham, AL |
| January 31, 2026; 2:00 pm, ESPN+ | | at Wichita State | W 83–65 | 8–13 (1–8) | 25 – Smallwood | 16 – Duffy | 4 – Carter | Charles Koch Arena (1,083); Wichita, KS |
| February 3, 2026; 6:00 pm, ESPN+ | | UTSA | W 81–69 | 9–13 (2–8) | 19 – Moffitt | 8 – Duffy | 7 – Munoz | Bartow Arena (407); Birmingham, AL |
| February 7, 2026; 1:00 pm, ESPN+ | | at Florida Atlantic | L 63–68 | 9–14 (2–9) | 12 – Moffitt | 5 – Moffitt | 5 – Tied | Eleanor R. Baldwin Arena (738); Boca Raton, FL |
| February 10, 2026; 6:00 pm, ESPN+ | | Memphis | W 58–56 | 10–14 (3–9) | 22 – Smallwood | 13 – Duffy | 5 – Armstead | Bartow Arena (634); Birmingham, AL |
| February 17, 2026; 6:30 pm, ESPN+ | | at North Texas | L 54–84 | 10–15 (3–10) | 15 – Moffitt | 10 – Moffitt | 2 – Tied | The Super Pit (1,737); Denton, TX |
| February 20, 2026; 6:30 pm, ESPN+ | | at Tulsa | L 55–59 | 10–16 (3–11) | 14 – Munoz | 12 – Duffy | 3 – Tied | Reynolds Center (1414); Tulsa, OK |
| February 25, 2026; 6:00 pm, ESPN+ | | Wichita State | L 54–60 | 10–17 (3–12) | 14 – Smallwood | 13 – Duffy | 5 – Munoz | Bartow Arena (310); Birmingham, AL |
| February 28, 2026; 2:00 pm, ESPN+ | | Temple | L 57–86 | 10–18 (3–13) | 13 – Tied | 14 – Duffy | 6 – Armstead | Bartow Arena (455); Birmingham, AL |
| March 4, 2026; 7:00 pm, ESPN+ | | at Memphis | W 79–76 ^{OT} | 11–18 (4–13) | 23 – Moffitt | 16 – Moffitt | 8 – Munoz | Elma Roane Fieldhouse (881); Memphis, TN |
| March 7, 2026; 2:00 pm, ESPN+ | | Charlotte | L 66–69 ^{OT} | 11–19 (4–14) | 17 – Smallwood | 9 – Duffy | 9 – Munoz | Bartow Arena (453); Birmingham, AL |
*Non-conference game. ^{#}Rankings from AP Poll. (#) Tournament seedings in parentheses. All times are in Central.
