= 2026–27 South Florida Bulls women's basketball team =

Intercollegiate basketball season

2026–27 South Florida Bulls women's basketball
- Conference: American Conference
- Record: 5–1 (0–0 American)
- Head coach: Kristy Curry (1st season)
- Assistant coaches: Kelly Curry; Tennille Adams; Bri Hutchen; Sydney-Anne Cottrell; Parker Lovett
- Home arena: Yuengling Center

2026–27 American Conference women's basketball standings
| | Conf. | | | | Overall |
| Team | W | | L | PCT | W | | L | PCT |
|---|---|---|---|---|---|---|---|---|
| Memphis | 0 | – | 0 | – | 5 | – | 0 | 1.000 |
| Rice | 0 | – | 0 | – | 5 | – | 0 | 1.000 |
| South Florida | 0 | – | 0 | – | 5 | – | 1 | .833 |
| North Texas | 0 | – | 0 | – | 4 | – | 1 | .800 |
| Tulane | 0 | – | 0 | – | 4 | – | 1 | .800 |
| Tulsa | 0 | – | 0 | – | 4 | – | 1 | .800 |
| Temple | 0 | – | 0 | – | 3 | – | 1 | .750 |
| UAB | 0 | – | 0 | – | 3 | – | 1 | .750 |
| Charlotte | 0 | – | 0 | – | 2 | – | 2 | .500 |
| UTSA | 0 | – | 0 | – | 2 | – | 2 | .500 |
| Wichita State | 0 | – | 0 | – | 2 | – | 3 | .400 |
| Florida Atlantic | 0 | – | 0 | – | 2 | – | 4 | .333 |
| East Carolina | 0 | – | 0 | – | 1 | – | 3 | .250 |
† 2027 American tournament winner As of November 22, 2026

The 2026–27 South Florida Bulls women's basketball team currently represents the University of South Florida during the 2026–27 NCAA Division I women's basketball season. The Bulls, led by first-year head coach Kristy Curry, play their home games at Yuengling Center in Tampa, Florida, and compete as a member of the American Conference.

== Previous season ==
The Bulls finished the 2025–26 season 20–12 overall and 13–5 in American play, finishing third in the conference. As the No. 3 seed in the American tournament, they lost in the quarterfinals to No. 6 seeded UTSA after being upset 51–62 to end their season.

On March 24, 2026, Alabama head coach Kristy Curry was named as the new head coach of the program, taking over from interim head coach Michelle Woods-Baxter.

== Offseason ==
=== Departures ===
South Florida departures
| Name | Num | Pos. | Height | Year | Hometown | Reason for departure |
|---|---|---|---|---|---|---|
| Katie Davidson | 1 | Guard | 5'10" | Graduate Student | Indianapolis, IN | Graduated |
| Yana Karamfilova | 2 | Forward | 6'2" | Sophomore | Sofia, Bulgaria | Transferred to Pacific |
| Janette Aarnio | 9 | Guard | 5'11" | Senior | Vantaa, Finland | Transferred to UTSA |
| Edyn Battle | 10 | Guard | 5'7" | Senior | Gahanna, OH | Graduated |
| Kirsten Lewis-Williams | 11 | Guard | 5'10" | Junior | Mooresville, NC | Transferred to Eastern Kentucky |
| Ines Piper | 14 | Forward | 6'0" | Graduate Student | Paris, France | Graduated |
| L'or Mputu | 21 | Forward | 6'2" | Graduate Student | Kinshasa, DR Congo | Graduated |
| Jelena Bulajic | 23 | Guard | 5'10" | Freshman | Herceg Novi, Montenegro | Transferred to Purdue |
| Raina Tomasicka | 24 | Guard | 5'11" | Sophomore | Jēkabpils, Latvia | Transferred to New Mexico State |
| Carla Brito | 55 | Forward | 5'11" | Senior | Puerto del Rosario, Spain | Graduated, signed to play professionally in Spain with Casademont Zaragoza |

=== Incoming transfers ===
South Florida incoming transfers
| Name | Num | Pos. | Height | Year | Hometown | Previous school |
|---|---|---|---|---|---|---|
| Gabby Kennerly | 1 | Guard | 5'9" | Senior | Charlotte, NC | Mount St. Mary's |
| Hannah Kohn | 5 | Guard | 5'9" | Senior | Oviedo, FL | Clemson |
| Savannah Curry | 10 | Guard | 5'11" | Junior | Fallston, MD | Temple |
| Amourie Porter | 15 | Guard/Forward | 5'10" | Senior | Glen Burnie, MD | Winthrop |
| Kendall Puryear | 24 | Forward | 6'3" | Junior | Lee's Summit, MO | Purdue |
| Kate Novick | 33 | Guard | 6'0" | Senior | Grodno, Belarus | DePaul |
| Mallory Collier | 42 | Center | 6'3" | Senior | Millington, TN | NC State |

=== Recruiting class ===
There was no 2026 recruiting class.

== Preseason ==
On October 9, 2026, the American Conference released its annual preseason coaches poll and awards. South Florida was picked to finish third in the conference, along with one out of thirteen first place votes.

=== Preseason rankings ===
American Preseason Poll
| Place | Team | Votes |
|---|---|---|
| 1 | Rice | 142 (10) |
| 2 | UTSA | 125 (2) |
| 3 | South Florida | 121 (1) |
| 4 | Tulsa | 117 |
| 5 | Temple | 96 |
| 6 | North Texas | 87 |
| 7 | East Carolina | 82 |
| 8 | Florida Atlantic | 60 |
| 9 | Memphis | 54 |
| 10 | Charlotte | 44 |
| 11 | Tulane | 41 |
| 12 | UAB | 26 |
| 13 | Wichita State | 26 |
(#) first-place votes

=== Preseason All-Conference Teams ===
Preseason All-Conference Teams
| Player | Year | Position | Team |
|---|---|---|---|
| Stefanie Ingram | 5th Year | Guard | First |

== Roster ==
Years are listed according to the new NCAA age-based eligibility model.

2026–27 South Florida Bulls women's basketball team
Players
Coaches

| Pos. | # | Name | Height | Year | Previous school | Hometown |
|---|---|---|---|---|---|---|
| G | 1 | Gabby Kennerly | 5 ft 9 in (1.75 m) | Sr | Howard High School; Mount St. Mary's | Charlotte, NC |
| G | 3 | Serenity Hardy | 5 ft 9 in (1.75 m) | Fr | Winter Haven High School | Lakeland, FL |
| G | 5 | Hannah Kohn | 5 ft 9 in (1.75 m) | Sr | Hagerty High School; Clemson | Oviedo FL |
| C | 7 | Lana Vukcevic | 6 ft 5 in (1.96 m) | Jr | Mirko Vesovic Economics Secondary School | Podgorica, Montenegro |
| F | 8 | Fatou Diakite | 6 ft 3 in (1.91 m) | Sr | Niagara Prep; Charlotte | Abidjan, Ivory Coast |
| G | 10 | Savannah Curry | 6 ft 0 in (1.83 m) | Jr | Westtown School; Temple | Fallston, MD |
| G | 13 | Stefanie Ingram (5th) | 5 ft 8 in (1.73 m) | Sr | Lake Highland Prep; Florida Atlantic | Orlando, FL |
| G | 15 | Amourie Porter | 5 ft 10 in (1.78 m) | Sr | Glen Burnie High School; Winthrop | Glen Burnie, MD |
| F | 19 | Lisandra Vetesina | 6 ft 2 in (1.88 m) | Fr | Tallinn Sports Academy | Estonia |
| G | 22 | Lee Teichman | 5 ft 8 in (1.73 m) | So | | Bitan Aharon, Israel |
| F | 24 | Kendall Puryear | 6 ft 3 in (1.91 m) | Jr | Blue Springs South High School; Purdue | Lee's Summit, MO |
| G | 33 | Kate Novik | 6 ft 0 in (1.83 m) | Sr | DePaul | Grodno, Belarus |
| C | 42 | Mallory Collier | 6 ft 3 in (1.91 m) | Sr | Bartlett High School; NC State | Millington, TN |

Head coach

- Kristy Curry (Louisiana–Monroe)

Assistant coach(es)

- Kelly Curry (Texas A&M)
- Tennille Adams (Arkansas)
- Bri Hutchen (Alabama)
- Sydney-Anne Cottrell (Texas A&M–Corpus Christi)
- Parker Lovett (Alabama)

Legend

- (C) Team captain
- (S) Suspended
- (I) Ineligible
- (W) Walk-on
- Injured
- Current redshirt

Roster
Last update: October 19, 2026

== Schedule and results ==
| Date time, TV | Rank^{#} | Opponent^{#} | Result | Record | High points | High rebounds | High assists | Site (attendance) city, state |
Non-conference regular season
| November 2, 2026*; 5:00 p.m., ESPN+ | | Furman | W 80–54 | 1–0 | 15 – Ingram | 9 – Puryear | 5 – Ingram | Yuengling Center (2,191); Tampa, FL |
| November 6, 2026*; 8:30 p.m., ESPN+ | | at Belmont; Multi-Conference Opening Weekend Showcase | W 69–66 | 2–0 | 18 – Kohn | 11 – Novik | 3 – Diakite | Curb Event Center (1,091); Nashville, TN |
| November 8, 2026*; 1:00 p.m., ESPN+ | | vs. Rhode Island; Multi-Conference Opening Weekend Showcase | L 63–82 | 2–1 | 19 – Diakite | 5 – Novik | 7 – Ingram | Curb Event Center (203); Nashville, TN |
| November 12, 2026*; 6:00 p.m., SECN+ | | at Florida | W 72–70 | 3–1 | 25 – Ingram | 10 – Ingram | 6 – Ingram | O'Connell Center (1,215); Gainesville, FL |
| November 15, 2026*; 3:00 p.m., ESPN+ | | FIU | W 69–35 | 4−1 | 17 – Porter | 11 – Diakite | 4 – Ingram | Yuengling Center (2,060); Tampa, FL |
| November 18, 2026*; 7:00 p.m., ESPN+ | | Binghamton | W 72–61 | 5−1 | 21 – Diakite | 11 – Puryear | 6 – Ingram | Yuengling Center (1,790); Tampa, FL |
| November 22, 2026*; 1:00 p.m., ESPN+ | | vs. Texas Tech; WBCA Showcase | | | | | | State Farm Field House; Orlando, FL |
| November 27, 2026*; 9:00 p.m., ESPN+ | | vs. Seton Hall; Paradise Jam Reef Division semifinal | | | | | | UVI Sports and Fitness Center; Charlotte Amalie, USVI |
| November 28, 2026*; 6:30/9:00 p.m., ESPN+ | | vs. Penn State or Baylor; Paradise Jam Reef Division | | | | | | UVI Sports and Fitness Center; Charlotte Amalie, USVI |
| December 1, 2026*; 7:00 p.m., ESPN+ | | Arkansas–Pine Bluff | | | | | | Yuengling Center; Tampa, FL |
| December 4, 2026*; 7:00 p.m., ESPN+ | | Morgan State | | | | | | Yuengling Center; Tampa, FL |
| December 15, 2026*; 7:00 p.m., ESPN+ | | Longwood | | | | | | Yuengling Center; Tampa, FL |
| December 20, 2026*; 9:00 p.m., ESPN+ | | vs. Auburn; Cherokee Invitational | | | | | | Harrah's Cherokee Resort; Cherokee, NC |
| December 21, 2026*; 6:30 p.m., ESPN+ | | vs. Middle Tennessee; Cherokee Invitational | | | | | | Harrah's Cherokee Resort; Cherokee, NC |
American regular season
| December 30, 2026; 7:30 p.m., ESPN+ | | at North Texas | | | | | | The Super Pit; Denton, TX |
| January 2, 2027; 2:00 p.m., ESPN+ | | UTSA | | | | | | Yuengling Center; Tampa, FL |
| January 6, 2027; 7:00 p.m., ESPN+ | | Tulsa | | | | | | Yuengling Center; Tampa, FL |
| January 14, 2027; 7:00 p.m., ESPN+ | | at Charlotte | | | | | | Dale F. Halton Arena; Charlotte, NC |
| January 17, 2027; 2:00 p.m., ESPN+ | | at East Carolina | | | | | | Williams Arena; Greenville, NC |
| January 20, 2027; 7:00 p.m., ESPN+ | | Temple | | | | | | Yuengling Center; Tampa, FL |
| January 24, 2027; 2:00 p.m., ESPN+ | | Florida Atlantic | | | | | | Yuengling Center; Tampa, FL |
| January 27, 2027; 7:00 p.m., ESPN+ | | at Wichita State | | | | | | Charles Koch Arena; Wichita, KS |
| January 30, 2027; 12:00 p.m., ESPNU | | at Tulsa | | | | | | Reynolds Center; Tulsa, OK |
| February 3, 2027; TBA, ESPN+ | | East Carolina | | | | | | Yuengling Center; Tampa, FL |
| February 6, 2027; 2:00 p.m., ESPN+ | | Tulane | | | | | | Yuengling Center; Tampa, FL |
| February 10, 2027; 7:00 p.m., ESPN+ | | UAB | | | | | | Yuengling Center; Tampa, FL |
| February 17, 2027; 7:30 p.m., ESPN+ | | at UTSA | | | | | | Convocation Center; San Antonio, TX |
| February 20, 2027; 2:00 p.m., ESPN+ | | Rice | | | | | | Yuengling Center; Tampa, FL |
| February 24, 2027; 7:00 p.m., ESPN+ | | at Florida Atlantic | | | | | | Eleanor R. Baldwin Arena; Boca Raton, FL |
| February 27, 2027; 7:00 p.m., ESPN+ | | at Temple | | | | | | Liacouras Center; Philadelphia, PA |
| March 2, 2027; 7:00 p.m., ESPN+ | | Memphis | | | | | | Yuengling Center; Tampa, FL |
| March 6, 2027; 7:00 p.m., ESPN+ | | at Rice | | | | | | Tudor Fieldhouse; Houston, TX |
*Non-conference game. ^{#}Rankings from AP Poll. (#) Tournament seedings in parentheses. All times are in Eastern.

== Rankings ==
Ranking movements Legend: — = Not ranked
| | Week | | | | | | | | | | | | | | | | | | | | |
| Poll | Pre | 1 | 2 | 3 | 4 | 5 | 6 | 7 | 8 | 9 | 10 | 11 | 12 | 13 | 14 | 15 | 16 | 17 | 18 | 19 | Final |
|---|---|---|---|---|---|---|---|---|---|---|---|---|---|---|---|---|---|---|---|---|---|
| AP | — | | | | | | | | | | | | | | | | | | | | |
| Coaches | — | | | | | | | | | | | | | | | | | | | | |
