= 2026–27 Wichita State Shockers women's basketball team =

American college basketball season

2026–27 Wichita State Shockers women's basketball
- Conference: American Conference
- Record: 2–3 (0–0 American)
- Head coach: Terry Nooner (4th season)
- Associate head coach: Melanie Balcomb
- Assistant coaches: Brooke Costley; Rachel Swartz; Uyen Tran; Mandy Willems
- Home arena: Charles Koch Arena

2026–27 American Conference women's basketball standings
	Conf.				Overall
Team	W		L	PCT	W		L	PCT
Rice	0	–	0	–	5	–	0	1.000
Memphis	0	–	0	–	4	–	0	1.000
UAB	0	–	0	–	3	–	0	1.000
South Florida	0	–	0	–	4	–	1	.800
North Texas	0	–	0	–	3	–	1	.750
Temple	0	–	0	–	3	–	1	.750
Tulane	0	–	0	–	3	–	1	.750
Tulsa	0	–	0	–	3	–	1	.750
UTSA	0	–	0	–	2	–	2	.500
Florida Atlantic	0	–	0	–	2	–	3	.400
Wichita State	0	–	0	–	2	–	3	.400
Charlotte	0	–	0	–	1	–	2	.333
East Carolina	0	–	0	–	1	–	3	.250
† 2027 American tournament winner As of November 18, 2026

The 2026–27 Wichita State Shockers women's basketball team currently represents Wichita State University during the 2026–27 NCAA Division I women's basketball season. The Shockers, led by fourth-year head coach Terry Nooner, will play their home games at Charles Koch Arena in Wichita, Kansas, and compete as a member of the American Conference.

== Previous season ==
The Shockers finished the 2025–26 season 8–23 overall and 5–13 in American play, finishing eleventh in the conference. They failed to qualify for the American tournament.

== Offseason ==
=== Departures ===
Wichita State departures
Name	Num.	Pos.	Height	Year	Hometown	Reason for departure
Azjah Reeves	0	Guard	5'8"	Junior	Oklahoma City, OK	Transferred to Presbyterian
Kyleigh Ortiz	1	Guard	5'6"	(redshirt) Junior	Kansas, OK	Transferred to Purdue Northwest (D-II)
Abby Cater	2	Guard	5'7"	Graduate Student	PG County, MD	Graduated
Jaila Harding	4	Guard	5'8"	Graduate Student	Wichita, KS	Graduated
Diamond Richardson	5	Guard	5'7"	Graduate Student	Sacramento, CA	Graduated
Fiona Diomande	7	Guard	5'11"	(redshirt) Freshman	Paris, France	Transferred to Presbyterian
Bella Belong	8	Forward	6'2"	Junior	Yaounde, Cameroon	Transferred to Georgetown College (NAIA)
Jaida McDonald	11	Forward	5'11"	Junior	Dallas, TX	Transferred to Old Dominion
Bre'Yon White	12	Forward	5'11"	Graduate Student	Pearland, TX	Graduated
Taya Davis	14	Guard	5'7"	Graduate Student	Decatur, IL	Graduated
Treasure Thompson	21	Forward	6'2"	Graduate Student	Joliet, IL	Graduated
Maimouna Sissoko	24	Forward	6'3"	Senior	Bamako, Mali	Graduated
Karys Washington	25	Guard	5'10"	Junior	Fort Smith, AR	Transferred to CSU Pueblo (D-II)
Cheyenne Banks	42	Center	6'4"	Graduate Student	McLoud, OK	Graduated
Sophie Benharouga	77	Forward	6'2"	Graduate Student	Grenoble, France	Graduated

=== Incoming transfers ===
Wichita State incoming transfers
Name	Num.	Pos.	Height	Year	Hometown	Previous school
Kendall Robinson	7	Guard	5'10"	Junior	Fort Worth, TX	UT Arlington
Clara Koulibaly	8	Forward	6'3"	Senior	Montreal, Quebec	Auburn
Klea Kaci	9	Guard	5'11"	Senior	Mississauga, Ontario	Wagner
Ma'Riya Vincent	12	Guard	6'0"	Junior	Houston, TX	Missouri
Amaya Lacy	21	Guard	5'9"	Junior	Long Beach, CA	Frank Phillips (NJCAA)
Lily Ba	22	Forward	6'3"	Senior	Overland Park, KS	Louisiana
Lili Harrison	40	Forward	6'2"	Sophomore	Lebanon, PA	Delaware State

=== Recruiting class ===
There was no 2026 recruiting class.

== Roster ==
2026–27 Wichita State Shockers women's basketball team
Players
Coaches

Pos.	#	Name	Height	Year	Previous school	Hometown
G	1	Mari Milton	5 ft 7 in (1.7 m)	Fr	North Crowley High School	Fort Worth, TX
G	2	Rachel Skulsky	5 ft 9 in (1.75 m)	Fr	Royal Crown School	Calgary, Alberta
G	5	Kaylea Lacey	5 ft 9 in (1.75 m)	Fr	Alton High School	Alton, IL
G	7	Kendall Robinson	5 ft 10 in (1.78 m)	Jr	North Crowley High School; UT Arlington	Fort Worth, TX
F	8	Clara Koulibaly	6 ft 3 in (1.91 m)	Sr	Auburn	Montreal, Quebec
G	9	Klea Kaci	5 ft 10 in (1.78 m)	Sr	Turner Fenton Secondary School; Wagner	Mississauga, Ontario
G	11	Aaliyah Broadus	5 ft 11 in (1.8 m)	Fr	Cherokee Trail High School	Denver, CO
G	12	Ma'Riya Vincent	6 ft 0 in (1.83 m)	Jr	Cypress Springs High School; Missouri	Houston, TX
G	21	Amaya Lacy	5 ft 9 in (1.75 m)	Jr	AZ Compass Prep; Frank Phillips College	Long Beach, CA
F	22	Lily Ba	6 ft 3 in (1.91 m)	Sr	Blue Valley West High School; Louisiana	Overland Park, KS
G	23	Alexis Leyva	5 ft 11 in (1.8 m)	Fr	Lincoln Christian High School	Tulsa, OK
F	40	Lili Harrison	6 ft 2 in (1.88 m)	So	Lebanon High School; Delaware State	Lebanon, PA

Head coach

- Terry Nooner (Kansas)

Assistant coach(es)

- Melanie Balcomb (TCNJ)
- Brooke Costley (Emporia State)
- Rachel Swartz (Missouri State)
- Uyen Tran (Central Methodist)
- Mandy Willems (North Iowa Area CC)

Legend

- (C) Team captain
- (S) Suspended
- (I) Ineligible
- (W) Walk-on
- Injured
- Current redshirt

Roster
Last update: October 23, 2026

== Schedule and results ==
Date time, TV	Rank^{#}	Opponent^{#}	Result	Record	High points	High rebounds	High assists	Site (attendance) city, state
Exhibition
October 28, 2026*; 6:00 p.m.		Newman	W 80–49		19 – Milton	13 – Vincent	7 – Milton	Charles Koch Arena (869); Wichita, KS
Non-conference regular season
November 2, 2026*; 6:30 p.m., ESPN+		at Kansas State	L 41–61	0–1	14 – Vincent	9 – Tied	5 – Levya	Bramlage Coliseum (2,872); Manhattan, KS
November 6, 2026*; 5:30 p.m.		at Kansas City	L 78–83	0–2	17 – Vincent	7 – Milton	9 – Milton	Municipal Auditorium (628); Kansas City, MO
November 10, 2026*; 11:00 a.m., ESPN+		Missouri State	L 48–76	0–3	14 – Milton	5 – Harrison	3 – Vincent	Charles Koch Arena (3,223); Wichita, KS
November 14, 2026*; 2:00 p.m., ESPN+		UC Riverside	W 87–61	1–3	33 – Vincent	6 – Tied	7 – Milton	Charles Koch Arena (809); Wichita, KS
November 17, 2026*; 7:00 p.m.		at Oral Roberts	W 77–76	2–3	20 – Milton	13 – Milton	2 – Milton	Mabee Center (1,121); Tulsa, OK
November 22, 2026*; 4:00 p.m.		vs. No. 25 Oklahoma State; 28.5 Hoops Women's Invitational						T-Mobile Center; Kansas City, MO
November 28, 2026*; 1:30 p.m., ESPN+		at South Alabama; Jaguar Classic						Mitchell Center; Mobile, AL
November 29, 2026*; 11:00 a.m.		vs. Charleston Southern; Jaguar Classic						Mitchell Center; Mobile, AL
December 2, 2026*; 6:00 p.m., ESPN+		Haskell Indian Nations						Charles Koch Arena; Wichita, KS
December 6, 2026*; 1:00 p.m., ESPN+		at Middle Tennessee						Murphy Center; Murfreesboro, TN
December 12, 2026*; 2:00 p.m., ESPN+		Omaha						Charles Koch Arena; Wichita, KS
December 15, 2026*; 6:00 p.m., ESPN+		Jacksonville State						Charles Koch Arena; Wichita, KS
December 20, 2026*; 12:00 p.m.		at Sam Houston						Bernard Johnson Coliseum; Huntsville, TX
American regular season
December 30, 2026; TBA, ESPN+		at Tulane						Devlin Fieldhouse; New Orleans, LA
January 2, 2027; 2:00 p.m., ESPN+		UAB						Charles Koch Arena; Wichita, KS
January 6, 2027; 6:00 p.m., ESPN+		East Carolina						Charles Koch Arena; Wichita, KS
January 10, 2027; TBA, ESPN+		at UTSA						Convocation Center; San Antonio, TX
January 13, 2027; TBA, ESPN+		at North Texas						The Super Pit; Denton, TX
January 17, 2027; 12:00 p.m., ESPN+		Charlotte						Charles Koch Arena; Wichita, KS
January 23, 2027; 2:00 p.m., ESPN+		Temple						Charles Koch Arena; Wichita, KS
January 27, 2027; 6:00 p.m., ESPN+		South Florida						Charles Koch Arena; Wichita, KS
January 30, 2027; TBA, ESPN+		at Florida Atlantic						Eleanor R. Baldwin Arena; Boca Raton, FL
February 3, 2027; 6:00 p.m., ESPN+		Memphis						Charles Koch Arena; Wichita, KS
February 6, 2027; TBA, ESPN+		at Tulsa						Reynolds Center; Tulsa, OK
February 9, 2027; 6:00 p.m., ESPN+		Rice						Charles Koch Arena; Wichita, KS
February 13, 2027; TBA, ESPN+		at Temple						Liacouras Center; Philadelphia, PA
February 16, 2027; TBA, ESPN+		at Charlotte						Halton Arena; Charlotte, NC
February 21, 2027; 3:00 p.m., ESPN+		Tulane						Charles Koch Arena; Wichita, KS
February 24, 2027; TBA, ESPN+		at Memphis						Elma Roane Fieldhouse; Memphis, TN
February 27, 2027; TBA, ESPN+		at UAB						Bartow Arena; Birmingham, AL
March 3, 2027; 6:00 p.m., ESPN+		Tulsa						Charles Koch Arena; Wichita, KS
*Non-conference game. ^{#}Rankings from AP Poll. (#) Tournament seedings in parentheses. All times are in Central.
