= 2026–27 East Carolina Pirates women's basketball team =

American college basketball season

2026–27 East Carolina Pirates women's basketball
- Conference: American Conference
- Record: 1–1 (0–0 American)
- Head coach: Kim McNeill (8th season)
- Assistant coaches: Jasmine James; Jason Harris; Jeffrey Williams; Synia Johnson; Bobbi Smith
- Home arena: Williams Arena at Minges Coliseum

2026–27 American Conference women's basketball standings
	Conf.				Overall
Team	W		L	PCT	W		L	PCT
Rice	0	–	0	–	3	–	0	1.000
Memphis	0	–	0	–	2	–	0	1.000
UAB	0	–	0	–	2	–	0	1.000
South Florida	0	–	0	–	2	–	1	.667
East Carolina	0	–	0	–	1	–	1	.500
North Texas	0	–	0	–	1	–	1	.500
Temple	0	–	0	–	1	–	1	.500
Tulane	0	–	0	–	1	–	1	.500
Tulsa	0	–	0	–	1	–	1	.500
Florida Atlantic	0	–	0	–	1	–	2	.333
Charlotte	0	–	0	–	0	–	2	.000
UTSA	0	–	0	–	0	–	2	.000
Wichita State	0	–	0	–	0	–	2	.000
† 2027 American tournament winner As of November 10, 2026

The 2026–27 East Carolina Pirates women's basketball team currently represents East Carolina University during the 2025–26 NCAA Division I women's basketball season. The Pirates, led by eighth-year head coach Kim McNeill, play their home games in Williams Arena at Minges Coliseum in Greenville, North Carolina, and compete as a member of the American Conference.

== Previous season ==
The Pirates finished the 2025–26 season 22–10 overall and 14–4 in American play, finishing second in the conference. As the No. 2 seed in the American tournament, they earned a bye to the semifinals, where they suffered an upset loss by falling 44–54 by No. 6 UTSA to end their season.

== Offseason ==
=== Departures ===
East Carolina departures
Name	Number	Pos.	Height	Year	Hometown	Reason for departure
Savannah Brooks	2	Guard	5'9"	Senior	Taneytown, MD	Graduated
Taylor Barner	3	Guard	5'9"	(redshirt) Freshman	Cary, NC	Transferred to Providence
Kennedy Fauntleroy	4	Guard	5'7"	Senior	Upper Marlboro, MD	Transferred to Tennessee
Amanda Smith	11	Guard	5'8"	Freshman	Brooklyn, NY	Transferred to Northeastern
Bobbi Smith	14	Guard	5'11"	Senior	Garner, NC	Graduated, returned as assistant coach
Amaya Shaw	19	Forward	6'2"	Freshman	Lakeland, FL	Transferred to UNC Asheville
Anzhané Hutton	22	Forward	6'0"	Graduate Student	Dallas, TX	Graduated
Chimera Iloanya	23	Forward	6'0"	Senior	Tampa, FL	Graduated, entered transfer portal
Keanna Rembert	31	Forward	6'2"	Senior	Raleigh, NC	Graduated

=== Incoming transfers ===
East Carolina incoming transfers
Name	Number	Pos.	Height	Year	Hometown	Previous school
Kendall Sneed	9	Guard	5'8"	Junior	China, TX	Tulane
Jayla Holiman	11	Guard	5'6"	Senior	Edmond, OK	UTSA
Georgia Cox	15	Forward	6'4"	Senior	Ballarat, Australia	Evansville
Tuana Coskun	24	Guard	6'0"	Senior	Istanbul, Turkey	Bucknell
Sarah-Lee Blair	30	Center	6'5"	Sophomore	Fort Lauderdale, FL	George Mason

=== Recruiting class ===
College recruiting
Name	Hometown	School	Height	Weight	Commit date
Tristan Rickenbacker; W	Chesapeake, VA	Princess Anne High School	5 ft 11 in (1.80 m)	N/A	
Tristan Rickenbacker; W	Recruit ratings: Rivals: ESPN: (93)				
Overall recruit ranking:
Note: In many cases, Scout, Rivals, 247Sports, On3, and ESPN may conflict in their listings of height and weight.; In these cases, the average was taken. ESPN grades are on a 100-point scale.; Sources: "2026 Player Commits". ESPN. Archived from the original on October 16, 2026.

== Preseason ==
On October 9, 2026, the American Conference released its annual preseason coaches poll and awards. East Carolina was picked to finish seventh in the conference.

=== Preseason rankings ===
American Preseason Poll
Place	Team	Votes
1	Rice	142 (10)
2	UTSA	125 (2)
3	South Florida	121 (1)
4	Tulsa	117
5	Temple	96
6	North Texas	87
7	East Carolina	82
8	Florida Atlantic	60
9	Memphis	54
10	Charlotte	44
11	Tulane	41
12	UAB	26
13	Wichita State	26
(#) first-place votes

=== Preseason All-Conference Teams ===
No players were named to the Preseason All-Conference First or Second Team.

== Roster ==
Years are listed according to the new NCAA age-based eligibility model.

2026–27 East Carolina Pirates women's basketball team
Players
Coaches

Pos.	#	Name	Height	Year	Previous school	Hometown
F/C	0	Chelsea Dike	6 ft 2 in (1.88 m)	Fr		Malaga, Spain
G	1	Olivia Hilliard	5 ft 9 in (1.75 m)	So	S3 Academy	Fredericksburg, VA
G	3	Rylie Hite	5 ft 8 in (1.73 m)	Fr	King's Fork High School	Suffolk, VA
G	4	Tristan Rickenbacker	6 ft 0 in (1.83 m)	Fr	Princess Anne High School	Chesapeake, VA
G	5	Jayla Hearp (5th)	5 ft 9 in (1.75 m)	Sr	Smithfield High School	Hampton, VA
G	7	Irieanna Smoot	5 ft 10 in (1.78 m)	Fr	Virginia Academy	Manassas, VA
G	9	Kendall Sneed	5 ft 8 in (1.73 m)	Jr	Hardin-Jefferson High School; Tulane	China, TX
G	11	Jayla Holiman	5 ft 6 in (1.68 m)	Sr	McAlester High School; UTSA	Edmond, OK
F	15	Georgia Cox	5 ft 4 in (1.63 m)	Sr	Ballarat Rush; Evansville	Ballarat, Australia
F	21	Mildred Dibua	6 ft 1 in (1.85 m)	So	Fort Erie International	Fort Erie, Ontario
G	23	Ava Rush	6 ft 3 in (1.91 m)	Fr	Wando High School	Mount Pleasant, SC
G	24	Tuana Coskun	6 ft 0 in (1.83 m)	Sr	Rabun Gap-Nacoochee School; Bucknell	Istanbul, Turkey
C	30	Sarah-Lee Blair	6 ft 5 in (1.96 m)	So	St. Thomas Aquinas High School; George Mason	Fort Lauderdale, FL
F	44	Zaniah Zellous	6 ft 2 in (1.88 m)	So	DME Academy	Charleston, WV

Head coach

- Kim McNeill (Richmond)
- Jasmine James (Georgia)

Assistant coach(es)

- Jason Harris (Fordham)
- Jeffrey Williams (Howard)
- Synia Johnson (East Carolina)
- Bobbi Smith (East Carolina)

Legend

- (C) Team captain
- (S) Suspended
- (I) Ineligible
- (W) Walk-on
- (5th) Fifth-year senior
- Injured
- Current redshirt

Roster
Last update: October 16, 2026

== Schedule and results ==
Date time, TV	Rank^{#}	Opponent^{#}	Result	Record	High points	High rebounds	High assists	Site (attendance) city, state
Non-conference regular season
November 3, 2026*; 11:00 a.m., ESPN+		Charleston Southern	W 61–45	1–0	16 – Coskun	8 – Dibua	3 – Hearp	Williams Arena at Minges Coliseum (3,017); Greenville, NC
November 7, 2026*; 5:00 p.m., ESPN+		Liberty	L 49–82	1–1	13 – Hearp	5 – Rickenbacker	3 – Sneed	Williams Arena at Minges Coliseum (756); Greenville, NC
November 11, 2026*; 7:00 p.m., ESPN+		High Point						Williams Arena at Minges Coliseum; Greenville, NC
November 15, 2026*; 1:00 p.m.		at James Madison						Atlantic Union Bank Center; Harrisonburg, VA
November 22, 2026*; 1:00 p.m., FloCollege		at UNC Wilmington						Trask Coliseum; Wilmington, NC
November 27, 2026*; TBA		vs. Gardner–Webb; Raising the B.A.R Invitational semifinals						Haas Pavilion; Berkeley, CA
November 28, 2026*; TBA		vs. Delaware/California; Raising the B.A.R Invitational						Haas Pavilion; Berkeley, CA
December 2, 2026*; 6:00 p.m.		at Coastal Carolina						HTC Center; Conway, SC
December 6, 2026*; 2:00 p.m.		Maryland Eastern Shore						Williams Arena at Minges Coliseum; Greenville, NC
December 12, 2026*; 2:00 p.m.		UNC Asheville						Williams Arena at Minges Coliseum; Greenville, NC
December 17, 2026*; 11:00 a.m.		Campbell						Williams Arena at Minges Coliseum; Greenville, NC
December 21, 2026*; 1:00 p.m.		Winthrop						Williams Arena at Minges Coliseum; Greenville, NC
American regular season
December 30, 2026; TBA		Rice						Williams Arena at Minges Coliseum; Greenville, NC
January 3, 2027; TBA		at Tulsa						Donald W. Reynolds Center; Tulsa, OK
January 6, 2027; TBA		at Wichita State						Charles Koch Arena; Wichita, KS
January 9, 2027; TBA		Tulane						Williams Arena at Minges Coliseum; Greenville, NC
January 13, 2027; TBA		at Temple						Liacouras Center; Philadelphia, PA
January 17, 2027; TBA		South Florida						Williams Arena at Minges Coliseum; Greenville, NC
January 21, 2027; TBA		at Florida Atlantic						Eleanor R. Baldwin Arena; Boca Raton, FL
January 27, 2027; TBA		Memphis						Williams Arena at Minges Coliseum; Greenville, NC
January 30, 2027; TBA		UTSA						Williams Arena at Minges Coliseum; Greenville, NC
February 3, 2027; TBA		at South Florida						Yuengling Center; Tampa, FL
February 6, 2027; TBA		at UAB						Bartow Arena; Birmingham, AL
February 9, 2027; TBA		Florida Atlantic						Williams Arena at Minges Coliseum; Greenville, NC
February 13, 2027; TBA		Charlotte						Williams Arena at Minges Coliseum; Greenville, NC
February 17, 2027; TBA		at Rice						Tudor Fieldhouse; Houston, TX
February 20, 2027; TBA		at UTSA						Convocation Center; San Antonio, TX
February 24, 2027; TBA		UAB						Williams Arena at Minges Coliseum; Greenville, NC
February 27, 2027; TBA		North Texas						Williams Arena at Minges Coliseum; Greenville, NC
March 6, 2027; TBA		at Charlotte						Halton Arena; Charlotte, NC
*Non-conference game. ^{#}Rankings from AP Poll. (#) Tournament seedings in parentheses. All times are in Eastern.
