= 2026–27 UAB Blazers women's basketball team =

American college basketball season

2026–27 UAB Blazers women's basketball
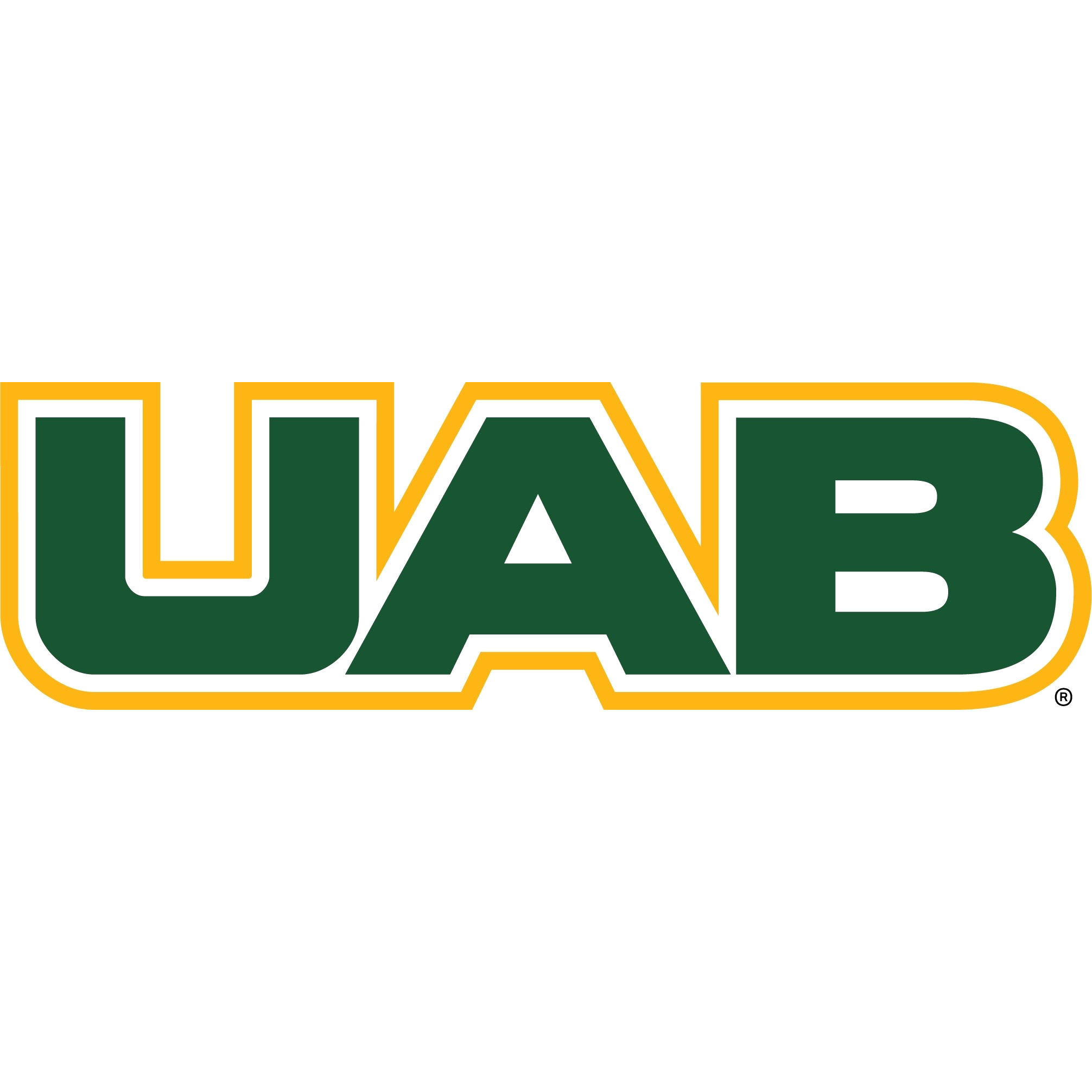
- Conference: American Conference
- Record: 2–0 (0–0 American)
- Head coach: Randy Norton (14th season)
- Associate head coach: Taren Martin; Ty Margenthaler
- Assistant coaches: Miyah Barnes; Hunter Simpson; Zakyia Weathersby
- Home arena: Bartow Arena

2026–27 American Conference women's basketball standings
	Conf.				Overall
Team	W		L	PCT	W		L	PCT
Memphis	0	–	0	–	3	–	0	1.000
Rice	0	–	0	–	3	–	0	1.000
UAB	0	–	0	–	2	–	0	1.000
South Florida	0	–	0	–	2	–	1	.667
East Carolina	0	–	0	–	1	–	1	.500
North Texas	0	–	0	–	1	–	1	.500
Temple	0	–	0	–	1	–	1	.500
Tulane	0	–	0	–	1	–	1	.500
Tulsa	0	–	0	–	1	–	1	.500
Charlotte	0	–	0	–	1	–	2	.333
Florida Atlantic	0	–	0	–	1	–	2	.333
UTSA	0	–	0	–	0	–	2	.000
Wichita State	0	–	0	–	0	–	2	.000
† 2027 American tournament winner As of November 11, 2026

The 2026–27 UAB Blazers women's basketball team will represent the University of Alabama at Birmingham (UAB) during the 2026–27 NCAA Division I women's basketball season. The Blazers, led by 14th-year head coach Randy Norton, will play their home games at the Bartow Arena in Birmingham, Alabama, and compete as a member of the American Conference.

== Previous season ==
The Blazers finished the 2025–26 season 11–19 overall and 4–14 in American play, finishing in a tie for tenth in the conference with Memphis. They failed to qualify for the American tournament.

== Offseason ==
=== Departures ===
UAB departures
Name	Number	Pos.	Height	Year	Hometown	Reason for departure
Journey Armstead	3	Guard	5'8"	Senior	Tulsa, OK	Graduated
Riley Talbert	10	Guard	5'10"	(redshirt) Freshman	Amelia Island, FL	Transferred to Kennesaw State
Peyton Musial	11	Guard	5'11"	Freshman	De Pere, WI	Transferred to Bucknell
Molly Moffitt	12	Forward	6'1"	Senior	Seattle, WA	Graduated
Samari Taylor	13	Forward	6'3"	Junior	Louisville, KY	Transferred to Coppin State
Monae' Duffy	14	Forward	5'10"	Senior	Lafayette, LA	Graduated
Sofia Munoz	20	Guard	5'8"	Freshman	Canovanas, PR	Transferred to Georgia Tech
Lika Kvirkvelia	21	Forward	6'4"	(redshirt) Sophomore	Kobuleti, Georgia	Transferred to Barry (D-II)
Cali Smallwood	23	Guard	5'9"	Junior	Blountsville, AL	Transferred to Mississippi State
Jordan Rosier	24	Guard	5'9"	Graduate Student	Tallahassee, FL	Graduated

=== Incoming transfers ===
UAB incoming transfers
Name	Number	Pos.	Height	Year	Hometown	Previous school
Hailey Jackson	4	Forward	5'11"	Junior	Tulsa, OK	Hutchinson CC (NJCAA)
Viktoria Ranisavljevic	7	Guard	5'7"	Sophomore	Massagno, Switzerland	Penn State
Serena Heeren	11	Forward	6'0"	Junior	Lincoln, NE	Chipola College (NJCAA)
Peyton Bradley	20	Guard	5'9"	Sophomore	Brandenburg, KY	Louisville
Terryauna Griffin	21	Guard	5'7"	Junior	Knoxville, TN	Walters State CC (NJCAA)
Ashley Garner	32	Forward	6'2"	Junior	Heber City, UT	Southern Idaho (NJCAA)
Emilia Dannebauer	33	Forward	6'4"	Junior	Berlin, Germany	UTSA

=== Recruiting class ===
College recruiting
Name	Hometown	School	Height	Weight	Commit date
Bella Harmon; G	Lakewood, CA	Saint Joseph High School	6 ft 1 in (1.85 m)	N/A	
Bella Harmon; G	Recruit ratings: 247Sports:				
Overall recruit ranking:
Note: In many cases, Scout, Rivals, 247Sports, On3, and ESPN may conflict in their listings of height and weight.; In these cases, the average was taken. ESPN grades are on a 100-point scale.; Sources:

== Preseason ==
On October 9, 2026, the American Conference released its annual preseason coaches poll and awards. UAB was picked to finish twelfth in the conference.

=== Preseason rankings ===
American Preseason Poll
Place	Team	Votes
1	Rice	142 (10)
2	UTSA	125 (2)
3	South Florida	121 (1)
4	Tulsa	117
5	Temple	96
6	North Texas	87
7	East Carolina	82
8	Florida Atlantic	60
9	Memphis	54
10	Charlotte	44
11	Tulane	41
12	UAB	26
13	Wichita State	26
(#) first-place votes

=== Preseason All-Conference Teams ===
No players were named to the Preseason All-Conference First or Second Team.

== Roster ==
2026–27 UAB Blazers women's basketball team
Players
Coaches

Pos.	#	Name	Height	Year	Previous school	Hometown
G	1	Eleecia Carter	5 ft 7 in (1.7 m)	RS Jr	Lake Highland Prep; Chattanooga	Winter Garden, FL
F	4	Hailey Jackson	5 ft 11 in (1.8 m)	Jr	Charles Page High School; Hutchinson CC	Tulsa, OK
G	5	Bella Harmon	6 ft 1 in (1.85 m)	Fr	Saint Joseph High School	Lakewood, CA
G	7	Viktoria Ranisavljevic	5 ft 7 in (1.7 m)	So	Penn State	Massagno, Switzerland
G	10	Nya Burns	5 ft 7 in (1.7 m)	Fr	Grace Christian Academy	Knoxville, TN
F	11	Serena Heeren	6 ft 0 in (1.83 m)	Jr	Lincoln Northeast High School; Chipola College	Lincoln, NE
G	20	Peyton Bradley	5 ft 9 in (1.75 m)	So	Meade County High School; Louisville	Brandenburg, KY
G	21	Terryauna Griffin	5 ft 7 in (1.7 m)	Jr	South-Doyle High School; Walters State CC	Knoxville, TN
F	30	Ashlyn Howard	6 ft 1 in (1.85 m)	So	Hewitt-Trussville High School	Trussville, AL
G	31	Mari Miller	5 ft 11 in (1.8 m)	So	Rock Bridge High School	Columbia, MO
F	32	Ashley Garner	6 ft 2 in (1.88 m)	Jr	Wasatch High School; College of Southern Idaho	Heber City, UT
F	33	Emilia Dannebauer	6 ft 4 in (1.93 m)	Jr	Sportgymnasium Chemnitz; UTSA	Berlin, Germany

Head coach

- Randy Norton (Iowa)

Assistant coach(es)

- Taren Martin (Illinois State)
- Ty Margenthaler (SIU Edwardsville)
- Miyah Barnes (UAB)
- Hunter Simpson (UAB)
- Zakyia Weathersby (UAB)

Legend

- (C) Team captain
- (S) Suspended
- (I) Ineligible
- (W) Walk-on
- Injured
- Current redshirt

Roster
Last update: October 19, 2026

== Schedule and results ==
Date time, TV	Rank^{#}	Opponent^{#}	Result	Record	High points	High rebounds	High assists	Site (attendance) city, state
Non-conference regular season
November 4, 2026*; 6:00 p.m., ESPN+		Fisk	W 77–67	1–0	29 – Jackson	15 – Garner	8 – Ranisavljevic	Bartow Arena (308); Birmingham, AL
November 7, 2026*; 1:00 p.m., ESPN+		at South Alabama	W 73–59	2–0	34 – Jackson	7 – Tied	3 – Ranisavljevic	Mitchell Center (273); Mobile, AL
November 11, 2026*; 6:00 p.m., ESPN+		Stillman						Bartow Arena; Birmingham, AL
November 19, 2026*; 6:00 p.m.		at Alabama A&M						AAMU Events Center; Huntsville, AL
November 23, 2026*; 6:30 p.m.		vs. George Washington; Jacksonville Classic						The Reef; Jacksonville, FL
November 24, 2026*; 8:00 p.m.		vs. Virginia; Jacksonville Classic						The Reef; Jacksonville, FL
November 29, 2026*; 2:00 p.m.		Mississippi Valley State						Bartow Arena; Birmingham, AL
December 1, 2026*; 11:00 a.m.		Murray State						Bartow Arena; Birmingham, AL
December 6, 2026*; 2:00 p.m.		Southern Miss						Bartow Arena; Birmingham, AL
December 13, 2026*; 2:00 p.m.		Chattanooga						Bartow Arena; Birmingham, AL
December 15, 2026*; 6:00 p.m.		Arkansas–Pine Bluff						Bartow Arena; Birmingham, AL
December 19, 2026*; 2:00 p.m.		Jackson State						Bartow Arena; Birmingham, AL
December 22, 2026*; 11:00 a.m.		UT Martin						Bartow Arena; Birmingham, AL
American regular season
January 2, 2027; 2:00 p.m.		at Wichita State						Charles Koch Arena; Wichita, KS
January 7, 2027; 6:00 p.m.		Charlotte						Bartow Arena; Birmingham, AL
January 10, 2027; 2:00 p.m.		Temple						Bartow Arena; Birmingham, AL
January 13, 2027; 6:30 p.m.		at Tulane						Devlin Fieldhouse; New Orleans, LA
January 16, 2027; 2:00 p.m.		Memphis						Bartow Arena; Birmingham, AL
January 20, 2027; 6:00 p.m.		Rice						Bartow Arena; Birmingham, AL
January 24, 2027; 2:00 p.m.		at UTSA						Convocation Center; San Antonio, TX
January 27, 2027; 5:30 p.m.		at Temple						Liacouras Center; Philadelphia, PA
February 2, 2027; 6:00 p.m.		North Texas						Bartow Arena; Birmingham, AL
February 6, 2027; 2:00 p.m.		East Carolina						Bartow Arena; Birmingham, AL
February 10, 2027; 6:00 p.m.		at South Florida						Yuengling Center; Tampa, FL
February 13, 2027; 1:00 p.m.		at Florida Atlantic						Eleanor R. Baldwin Arena; Boca Raton, FL
February 17, 2027; 6:00 p.m.		Tulsa						Bartow Arena; Birmingham, AL
February 21, 2027; 2:00 p.m.		at Charlotte						Halton Arena; Charlotte, NC
February 24, 2027; 5:00 p.m.		at East Carolina						Williams Arena at Minges Coliseum; Greenville, NC
February 27, 2027; 2:00 p.m.		Wichita State						Bartow Arena; Birmingham, AL
March 3, 2027; 6:00 p.m.		Tulane						Bartow Arena; Birmingham, AL
March 6, 2027; 2:00 p.m.		Memphis						Elma Roane Fieldhouse; Memphis, TN
*Non-conference game. ^{#}Rankings from AP Poll. (#) Tournament seedings in parentheses. All times are in Central.
