= 2026–27 Rice Owls women's basketball team =

American college basketball season

2026–27 Rice Owls women's basketball
- Conference: American Conference
- Record: 5–0 (0–0 American)
- Head coach: Lindsay Edmonds (6th season)
- Associate head coach: Nick Grant
- Assistant coaches: Lakevia Boykin; Danyelle Grant; Jalen Latta; Madi Miller
- Home arena: Tudor Fieldhouse

2026–27 American Conference women's basketball standings
	Conf.				Overall
Team	W		L	PCT	W		L	PCT
Memphis	0	–	0	–	4	–	0	1.000
Rice	0	–	0	–	4	–	0	1.000
UAB	0	–	0	–	3	–	0	1.000
South Florida	0	–	0	–	4	–	1	.800
North Texas	0	–	0	–	3	–	1	.750
Tulane	0	–	0	–	3	–	1	.750
Tulsa	0	–	0	–	3	–	1	.750
Temple	0	–	0	–	2	–	1	.667
UTSA	0	–	0	–	2	–	2	.500
Florida Atlantic	0	–	0	–	2	–	3	.400
Charlotte	0	–	0	–	1	–	2	.333
East Carolina	0	–	0	–	1	–	3	.250
Wichita State	0	–	0	–	1	–	3	.250
† 2027 American tournament winner As of November 18, 2026

The 2026–27 Rice Owls women's basketball team currently represents Rice University during the 2026–27 NCAA Division I women's basketball season. The Owls, led by sixth-year head coach Lindsay Edmonds, play their home games at the Tudor Fieldhouse in Houston, Texas, and compete as a member of the American Conference.

== Previous season ==
The Owls finished the 2025–26 season finished the season a program-best 29–7 overall and 17–1 in American play, finishing as regular season champions for the first time since joining the conference in 2024. Their only conference loss came in the team's final regular season game, losing 52–61 to UTSA at home on March 7.

As the top-seeded team in the American tournament, they earned a bye to the semifinals, defeating No. 5 North Texas 71–67 to advance to the championship game. They were unable to claim the conference title, as they lost to No. 6 UTSA for the second time of the season in a 40–54 upset.

As a top-seeded team that lost their conference tournament and did not qualify for the NCAA tournament, the Owls received an automatic bid to the WBIT for the first time. They were seeded No. 3 in the Texas A&M Bracket. They defeated unseeded Louisiana Tech 66–61 in the first round, before falling to No. 2 seeded Kansas 55–62 to end their historic season.

== Offseason ==
=== Departures ===
Rice departures
Name	Number	Pos.	Height	Year	Hometown	Reason for departure
Jill Twiehaus	3	Guard	5'10"	Sophomore	Tulsa, OK	TBD; not listed on roster
Dominique Ennis	11	Guard	5'9"	Senior	Fort Erie, Ontario	Graduated
Skyla Tuthill	14	Guard	5'11"	Freshman	Summerville, SC	Transferred to Florida Atlantic (Note: Did not play in the 2025–26 season.)
Kennedy Clifton	23	Guard/Forward	6'0"	Senior	Upper Marlboro, MD	Graduated
Shelby Hayes	44	Center	6'2"	Senior	Cedar Park, TX	Graduated

=== Incoming transfers ===
Rice incoming transfers
Name	Number	Pos.	Height	Year	Hometown	Previous school
Reychel Douglas	00	Guard	6'0"	Junior	Raleigh, NC	Alabama
Lily Taulelei	9	Forward/Center	6'3"	Junior	Wellington, New Zealand	Iowa State
Paige Colfer	11	Forward	6'0"	Junior	Eagle, ID	Utah Tech

=== Recruiting class ===
There was no 2026 recruiting class.

== Preseason ==
On October 9, 2026, the American Conference released its annual preseason coaches poll and awards. Rice was picked to finish first in the conference, along with ten out of thirteen first place votes.

=== Preseason rankings ===
American Preseason Poll
Place	Team	Votes
1	Rice	142 (10)
2	UTSA	125 (2)
3	South Florida	121 (1)
4	Tulsa	117
5	Temple	96
6	North Texas	87
7	East Carolina	82
8	Florida Atlantic	60
9	Memphis	54
10	Charlotte	44
11	Tulane	41
12	UAB	26
13	Wichita State	26
(#) first-place votes

=== Preseason All-Conference Teams ===
Preseason All-Conference Teams
Player	Year	Position	Team
Victoria Flores	Senior	Guard	First
Hailey Adams	(redshirt) Senior	Guard	Second

=== Other awards ===
Other awards
Player	Year	Position	Award won
Victoria Flores	Senior	Guard	Preseason Player of the Year

== Roster ==
2026–27 Rice Owls women's basketball team
Players
Coaches

Pos.	#	Name	Height	Year	Previous school	Hometown
G	00	Reychel Douglas	6 ft 0 in (1.83 m)	Jr	Millbrook Magnet High School; Alabama	Raleigh, NC
G	1	Kaylen Sta. Maria	5 ft 8 in (1.73 m)	Fr	Niagara Prep	Vaughan, Ontario
G	4	Pace Rickard	5 ft 6 in (1.68 m)	Sr	Grand Rapids Christian High School	Grand Rapids, MI
G	5	Mylee Guinn	5 ft 11 in (1.8 m)	So	Prestonwood Christian Academy	Frisco, TX
G	7	Louann Battiston	5 ft 5 in (1.65 m)	Sr	Duke	Montigny-le-Tilleul, Belgium
F/C	9	Lily Taulelei	6 ft 3 in (1.91 m)	Jr	Queen Margaret College; Iowa State	Wellington, New Zealand
G	10	Jordan Blackman	5 ft 10 in (1.78 m)	So	Bishop Montgomery High School	Inglewood, CA
F	11	Paige Colfer	6 ft 0 in (1.83 m)	Jr	Eagle High School; Utah Tech	Eagle, ID
G	12	Layla Conley	5 ft 8 in (1.73 m)	Sr	John Marshall Harlan High School	San Antonio, TX
C	21	Myah Hazleton	6 ft 4 in (1.93 m)	Jr	Sparrows Point High School; Virginia Tech	Baltimore, MD
G	22	Hailey Adams	6 ft 1 in (1.85 m)	RS Sr	Tom C. Clark High School	San Antonio, TX
G	24	Aniah Alexis	6 ft 1 in (1.85 m)	Jr	Cypress Lakes High School	Waller, TX
C	34	Hanna Hilberth	6 ft 4 in (1.93 m)	So	Lulea Gymansieskolor	Stockholm, Sweden
G	55	Victoria Flores	5 ft 7 in (1.7 m)	Sr	Duncanville High School; TCU	West Dallas, TX

Head coach

- Lindsay Edmonds (Appalachian State)

Assistant coach(es)

- Nick Grant (Baylor)
- Lakevia Boykin (Wake Forest)
- Danyelle Grant (Utah State)
- Jalen Latta (Western New England)
- Madi Miller (Abilene Christian)

Legend

- (C) Team captain
- (S) Suspended
- (I) Ineligible
- (W) Walk-on
- Injured
- Current redshirt

Roster
Last update: October 31, 2026

== Schedule and results ==
Date time, TV	Rank^{#}	Opponent^{#}	Result	Record	High points	High rebounds	High assists	Site (attendance) city, state
Exhibition
October 27, 2026*; 7:00 p.m.		Eastern New Mexico	W 85–43		16 – Alexis	8 – Adams	7 – Battiston	Tudor Fieldhouse (425); Houston, TX
Non-conference regular season
November 2, 2026*; 8:25 p.m., ESPN+		Houston Christian	W 72–34	1–0	19 – Flores	16 – Adams	8 – Battiston	Tudor Fieldhouse (570); Houston, TX
November 6, 2026*; 7:30 p.m., ESPN+		vs. Murray State; Opening Statement	W 69–64	2–0	22 – Battiston	9 – Alexis	6 – Battiston	Robins Center (1,434); Richmond, VA
November 8, 2026*; 1:30 p.m., ESPN+		at Richmond; Opening Statement	W 73–60 ^{OT}	3–0	20 – Battiston	14 – Adams	7 – Adams	Robins Center (1,101); Richmond, VA
November 12, 2026*; 7:00 p.m., ESPN+		Texas Southern	W 71–46	4–0	16 – Alexis	11 – Adams	7 – Battiston	Tudor Fieldhouse (630); Houston, TX
November 17, 2026*; 8:30 p.m., MW+		at UNLV	W 74–72	5–0	19 – Battiston	15 – Adams	7 – Battiston	Cox Pavilion (773); Las Vegas, NV
November 22, 2026*; 7:00 p.m., ESPN+		Pepperdine						Tudor Fieldhouse; Houston, TX
November 25, 2026*; 12:00 p.m., ESPN+		UTRGV; Rice Invitational						Tudor Fieldhouse; Houston, TX
November 27, 2026*; 3:00 p.m., ESPN+		Lamar; Rice Invitational						Tudor Fieldhouse; Houston, TX
December 2, 2026*; 7:00 p.m., ESPN+		Grambling State						Tudor Fieldhouse; Houston, TX
December 5, 2026*; 2:00 p.m., ESPNU		Princeton						Tudor Fieldhouse; Houston, TX
December 11, 2026*; 11:15 a.m., ESPN+		Houston; Rivalry						Tudor Fieldhouse; Houston, TX
December 17, 2026*; TBA, ESPN+		at Middle Tennessee						Murphy Center; Murfreesboro, TN
December 20, 2026*; 2:00 p.m., ESPN+		Prairie View A&M						Tudor Fieldhouse; Houston, TX
American regular season
December 30, 2026; 5:00 p.m., ESPN+		at East Carolina						Williams Arena at Minges Coliseum; Greenville, NC
January 2, 2027; 4:00 p.m., ESPN+		at Temple						Liacouras Center; Philadelphia, PA
January 6, 2027; 7:00 p.m., ESPN+		Florida Atlantic						Tudor Fieldhouse; Houston, TX
January 9, 2027; 2:00 p.m., ESPN+		North Texas						Tudor Fieldhouse; Houston, TX
January 16, 2027; 2:00 p.m., ESPN+		at UTSA						Convocation Center; San Antonio, TX
January 20, 2027; 6:00 p.m., ESPN+		at UAB						Bartow Arena; Birmingham, AL
January 24, 2027; 2:00 p.m., ESPN+		Tulsa						Tudor Fieldhouse; Houston, TX
January 27, 2027; 6:30 p.m., ESPN+		at Tulane						Devlin Fieldhouse; New Orleans, LA
January 31, 2027; 2:00 p.m., ESPN+		Charlotte						Tudor Fieldhouse; Houston, TX
February 6, 2027; 2:00 p.m., ESPN+		Memphis						Tudor Fieldhouse; Houston, TX
February 9, 2027; 6:00 p.m., ESPN+		at Wichita State						Charles Koch Arena; Wichita, KS
February 13, 2027; 2:00 p.m., ESPN+		at Tulsa						Donald W. Reynolds Center; Tulsa, OK
February 17, 2027; 7:00 p.m., ESPN+		East Carolina						Tudor Fieldhouse; Houston, TX
February 20, 2027; 1:00 p.m., ESPN+		at South Florida						Yuengling Center; Tampa, FL
February 24, 2027; 7:00 p.m., ESPN+		Temple						Tudor Fieldhouse; Houston, TX
February 27, 2027; 2:00 p.m., ESPN+		UTSA						Tudor Fieldhouse; Houston, TX
March 3, 2027; 6:30 p.m., ESPN+		at North Texas						The Super Pit; Denton, TX
March 6, 2027; 2:00 p.m., ESPN+		South Florida						Tudor Fieldhouse; Houston, TX
*Non-conference game. ^{#}Rankings from AP Poll. (#) Tournament seedings in parentheses. All times are in Central.

== Rankings ==
Ranking movements Legend: RV = Received votes
	Week																				
Poll	Pre	1	2	3	4	5	6	7	8	9	10	11	12	13	14	15	16	17	18	19	Final
AP	RV																				
Coaches	RV																				
