= 2026–27 Florida Atlantic Owls women's basketball team =

American college basketball season

2026–27 Florida Atlantic Owls women's basketball
- Conference: American Conference
- Record: 2–2 (0–0 American)
- Head coach: LeAnn Freeland (2nd season)
- Associate head coach: Brooklyn Kohlheim
- Assistant coaches: McKenah Peters; Alison Hughes; Keri Jewett-Giles
- Home arena: Eleanor R. Baldwin Arena

2026–27 American Conference women's basketball standings
	Conf.				Overall
Team	W		L	PCT	W		L	PCT
Memphis	0	–	0	–	3	–	0	1.000
Rice	0	–	0	–	3	–	0	1.000
UAB	0	–	0	–	3	–	0	1.000
North Texas	0	–	0	–	2	–	1	.667
South Florida	0	–	0	–	2	–	1	.667
Temple	0	–	0	–	2	–	1	.667
Florida Atlantic	0	–	0	–	2	–	2	.500
Tulane	0	–	0	–	1	–	1	.500
Tulsa	0	–	0	–	1	–	1	.500
Charlotte	0	–	0	–	1	–	2	.333
East Carolina	0	–	0	–	1	–	2	.333
UTSA	0	–	0	–	1	–	2	.333
Wichita State	0	–	0	–	0	–	3	.000
† 2027 American tournament winner As of November 12, 2026

The 2026–27 Florida Atlantic Owls women's basketball team currently represents Florida Atlantic University during the 2026–27 NCAA Division I women's basketball season. The Owls, led by second-year head coach LeAnn Freeland, play their home games at Eleanor R. Baldwin Arena in Boca Raton, Florida, and compete as a member of the American Conference.

== Previous season ==
In head coach LeAnn Freeland's first season, the Owls finished the 2025–26 season 14–19 overall and 7–11 in American play, finishing ninth in the conference. As the No. 9 seed in the American tournament, they defeated No. 8 Charlotte 74–70 in overtime in the first round, before being routed 57–80 to No. 5 North Texas to end their season.

== Offseason ==
=== Departures ===
Florida Atlantic departures
Name	Number	Pos.	Height	Year	Hometown	Reason for departure
Destyne Jackson	0	Guard	5'7"	Graduate Student	Lexington, KY	Graduated
Jess Moore	3	Guard	6'0"	Graduate Student	Auckland, New Zealand	Graduated
Michiyah Simmons	4	Guard	5'6"	Senior	Pompano Beach, FL	Graduated
Ineivi Plata	5	Guard	5'3"	Sophomore	White Plains, NY	Transferred to Saint Peter's
Ta'Ziah Jenkins	11	Guard	6'0"	Graduate Student	Louisville, KY	Graduated

=== Incoming transfers ===
Florida Atlantic incoming transfers
Name	Number	Pos.	Height	Year	Hometown	Previous school
Janiah Suprius	2	Guard	5'7"	Sophomore	Lake Worth, FL	Palm Beach State College (NJCAA)
Mani Piljevic	4	Guard	6'0"	Junior	Wollongong, Australia	Dodge City CC (NJCAA)
Skyla Tuthill	11	Guard	5'11"	Sophomore	Summerville, SC	Rice
Mia Jordan	12	Forward	6'3"	Senior	Gold Coast, Australia	Northern Kentucky
Jazzy Gipson	23	Guard	6'0"	Sophomore	Albuquerque, NM	SMU

=== Recruiting class ===
College recruiting
Name	Hometown	School	Height	Weight	Commit date
Jaelynn Housey; PG	Fort Lauderdale, FL	Nova High School	5 ft 10 in (1.78 m)	N/A	
Jaelynn Housey; PG	Recruit ratings: ESPN: (91)				
Overall recruit ranking:
Note: In many cases, Scout, Rivals, 247Sports, On3, and ESPN may conflict in their listings of height and weight.; In these cases, the average was taken. ESPN grades are on a 100-point scale.; Sources: "2026 Player Commits". ESPN. Archived from the original on October 20, 2026.

== Roster ==
Years are listed according to the new NCAA age-based eligibility model.

2026–27 Florida Atlantic Owls women's basketball team
Players
Coaches

Pos.	#	Name	Height	Year	Previous school	Hometown
G	2	Grace Carstensen	5 ft 11 in (1.8 m)	Sr	Nazareth Academy; DePaul	Hinsdale, IL
G	3	Janiah Suprius	5 ft 7 in (1.7 m)	So	Seminole Ridge Community High School; Palm Beach State College	Lake Worth, FL
G	4	Mani Piljevic	6 ft 0 in (1.83 m)	Jr	Holy Spirit College; Dodge City CC	Wollongong, Australia
G	5	Jaelynn Housey	5 ft 10 in (1.78 m)	Fr	Nova High School	Fort Lauderdale, FL
G	6	Erin Rodgers	6 ft 0 in (1.83 m)	Jr	Grayson High School	Lawrenceville, GA
G	7	Zahira Arizmendi	5 ft 8 in (1.73 m)	Sr	Middle Tennessee	Madrid, Spain
G	10	Haley Walker	5 ft 8 in (1.73 m)	GS	Rice Memorial High School; DePaul	Burlington, VT
G	11	Skyla Tuthill	5 ft 11 in (1.8 m)	So	Ashley Ridge High School; Rice	Summerville, SC
F	12	Mia Jordan	6 ft 3 in (1.91 m)	Sr	King's Christian College; Northern Kentucky	Gold Coast, Australia
G	14	Juju Leroux	5 ft 11 in (1.8 m)	Fr	South Fayette High School	Pittsburgh, PA
G	21	Madi Gewirtz	5 ft 11 in (1.8 m)	Jr	Highland High School; New Mexico State	Gilbert, AZ
F	22	Vivian Onugha	6 ft 2 in (1.88 m)	GS	Topfield College; Barton	Lagos, Nigeria
G	23	Jazzy Gipson	6 ft 0 in (1.83 m)	So	Duncanville High School; SMU	Albuquerque, NM
G	25	Keke Butler	5 ft 9 in (1.75 m)	Fr	Lawrence Central High School	Indianapolis, IN

Head coach

- LeAnn Freeland (Southern Indiana)

Assistant coach(es)

- Brooklyn Kohlheim (Florida Southern)
- McKenah Peters (Nova Southeastern)
- Alison Hughes (Nova Southeastern)
- Keri Jewett-Giles (Florida Gulf Coast)

Legend

- (C) Team captain
- (S) Suspended
- (I) Ineligible
- (W) Walk-on
- Injured
- Current redshirt

Roster
Last update: October 21, 2026

== Preseason ==
On October 9, 2026, the American Conference released its annual preseason coaches poll and awards. Florida Atlantic was picked to finish eighth in the conference.

=== Preseason rankings ===
American Preseason Poll
Place	Team	Votes
1	Rice	142 (10)
2	UTSA	125 (2)
3	South Florida	121 (1)
4	Tulsa	117
5	Temple	96
6	North Texas	87
7	East Carolina	82
8	Florida Atlantic	60
9	Memphis	54
10	Charlotte	44
11	Tulane	41
12	UAB	26
13	Wichita State	26
(#) first-place votes

=== Preseason All-Conference Teams ===
No players were named to the Preseason All-Conference First or Second Team.

== Schedule and results ==
Date time, TV	Rank^{#}	Opponent^{#}	Result	Record	High points	High rebounds	High assists	Site (attendance) city, state
Non-conference regular season
November 2, 2026*; 7:00 p.m., ACCNX		at Miami (FL)	L 48–75	0–1	13 – Rodgers	4 – Tied	2 – Tied	Watsco Center (1,286); Coral Gables, FL
November 7, 2026*; 2:00 p.m., ESPN+		Kennesaw State	W 68–28	1–1	13 – Rodgers	7 – Tied	4 – Gipson	Eleanor R. Baldwin Arena (623); Boca Raton, FL
November 8, 2026*; 2:00 p.m., ESPN+		No. 4 Duke	L 56–78	1–2	11 – Rodgers	5 – Leroux	4 – Tuthill	Eleanor R. Baldwin Arena (859); Boca Raton, FL
November 11, 2026*; 1:00 p.m., ESPN+		South Alabama	W 85–57	2–2	14 – Carstensen	8 – Leroux	3 – Tied	Eleanor R. Baldwin Arena (687); Boca Raton, FL
November 14, 2026*; 2:00 p.m., ESPN+		at Florida Gulf Coast						Alico Arena; Fort Myers, FL
November 19, 2026*; 6:00 p.m., SECN+		at Florida						O'Connell Center; Gainesville, FL
November 27, 2026*; 2:00 p.m., ESPN+		Western Kentucky; FAU Thanksgiving Classic						Eleanor R. Baldwin Arena; Boca Raton, FL
November 28, 2026*; 2:00 p.m., ESPN+		Buffalo; FAU Thanksgiving Classic						Eleanor R. Baldwin Arena; Boca Raton, FL
December 5, 2026*; 1:00 p.m.		at FIU						Ocean Bank Convocation Center; Miami, FL
December 8, 2026*; 11:00 a.m., ESPN+		Stony Brook						Eleanor R. Baldwin Arena; Boca Raton, FL
December 15, 2026*; 6:30 p.m.		at UCF						Addition Financial Arena; Orlando, FL
December 19, 2026; 2:00 p.m., ESPN+		North Florida; FAU Holiday Classic						Eleanor R. Baldwin Arena; Boca Raton, FL
December 20, 2026; 2:00 p.m., ESPN+		Kent State; FAU Holiday Classic						Eleanor R. Baldwin Arena; Boca Raton, FL
American regular season
December 30, 2026; TBA		UTSA						Eleanor R. Baldwin Arena; Boca Raton, FL
January 3, 2027; TBA		at North Texas						The Super Pit; Denton, TX
January 6, 2027; TBA		at Rice						Tudor Fieldhouse; Houston, TX
January 9, 2027; TBA		Tulsa						Eleanor R. Baldwin Arena; Boca Raton, FL
January 13, 2027; TBA		at Memphis						Elma Roane Fieldhouse; Memphis, TN
January 16, 2027; TBA		at Tulane						Devlin Fieldhouse; New Orleans, LA
January 21, 2027; TBA		East Carolina						Eleanor R. Baldwin Arena; Boca Raton, FL
January 24, 2027; TBA		at South Florida						Yuengling Center; Tampa, FL
January 30, 2027; TBA		Wichita State						Eleanor R. Baldwin Arena; Boca Raton, FL
February 3, 2027; TBA		Tulane						Eleanor R. Baldwin Arena; Boca Raton, FL
February 6, 2027; TBA		at Charlotte						Dale F. Halton Arena; Charlotte, NC
February 9, 2027; TBA		at East Carolina						Williams Arena at Minges Coliseum; Greenville, NC
February 13, 2027; TBA		UAB						Eleanor R. Baldwin Arena; Boca Raton, FL
February 17, 2027; TBA		at Temple						Liacouras Center; Philadelphia, PA
February 24, 2027; TBA		South Florida						Eleanor R. Baldwin Arena; Boca Raton, FL
February 27, 2027; TBA		Memphis						Eleanor R. Baldwin Arena; Boca Raton, FL
March 3, 2027; TBA		at UTSA						Convocation Center; San Antonio, TX
March 6, 2027; TBA		Temple						Eleanor R. Baldwin Arena; Boca Raton, FL
*Non-conference game. ^{#}Rankings from AP Poll. (#) Tournament seedings in parentheses. All times are in Eastern.
