= 2026–27 Charlotte 49ers women's basketball team =

American college basketball season

2026–27 Charlotte 49ers women's basketball
- Conference: American Conference
- Record: 0–0 (0–0 American)
- Head coach: Tomekia Reed (3rd season)
- Associate head coach: LaShonda Cousin
- Assistant coaches: Chase Campbell; Aaron A. Swinson
- Home arena: Dale F. Halton Arena

2026–27 American Conference women's basketball standings
	Conf.				Overall
Team	W		L	PCT	W		L	PCT
Charlotte	0	–	0	–	0	–	0	–
East Carolina	0	–	0	–	0	–	0	–
Florida Atlantic	0	–	0	–	0	–	0	–
Memphis	0	–	0	–	0	–	0	–
North Texas	0	–	0	–	0	–	0	–
Rice	0	–	0	–	0	–	0	–
South Florida	0	–	0	–	0	–	0	–
Temple	0	–	0	–	0	–	0	–
Tulane	0	–	0	–	0	–	0	–
Tulsa	0	–	0	–	0	–	0	–
UAB	0	–	0	–	0	–	0	–
UTSA	0	–	0	–	0	–	0	–
Wichita State	0	–	0	–	0	–	0	–
† 2027 American tournament winner

The 2026–27 Charlotte 49ers women's basketball team will represent the University of North Carolina at Charlotte during the 2026–27 NCAA Division I women's basketball season. The 49ers, led by third-year head coach Tomekia Reed, will play their home games at Dale F. Halton Arena in Charlotte, North Carolina, and compete as a member of the American Conference.

== Previous season ==
The 49ers finished the 2025–26 season 14–18 overall and 8–10 in American play, finishing in a tie for seventh in the conference with Temple. As the No. 8 seed in the American tournament, they fell 70–74 in overtime to No. 9 Florida Atlantic in the first round to end their season.

== Offseason ==
=== Departures ===
Charlotte departures
Name	Number	Pos.	Height	Year	Hometown	Reason for departure
Asianae Nicholson	1	Forward	5'10"	Senior	South Euclid, OH	Transferred to Alabama A&M
Karen Nimo	2	Guard	5'10"	Sophomore	Augusta, GA	Transferred to Coppin State
Tanajah Hayes	3	Guard	5'6"	Graduate Student	Charlotte, NC	Graduated
Princess Anderson	4	Guard	5'7"	Senior	Beaumont, TX	Graduated
Caitlin Staley	5	Forward	6'4"	Junior	Augusta, GA	Transferred to Alabama
Imani Smith	12	Guard	5'8"	Graduate Student	Hiram, GA	Graduated
Lucy Henderson	13	Guard	6'0"	Junior	Bossier City, LA	Transferred to Grambling State
Daphane White	15	Center	6'5"	Graduate Student	Gulfport, MS	Dismissed from team

=== Incoming transfers ===
Charlotte incoming transfers
Name	Number	Pos.	Height	Year	Hometown	Previous school
Da'Brya Clark	1	Guard	5'9"	Senior	Baltimore, MD	Norfolk State
Audia Young	2	Guard	5'9"	(redshirt) Senior	Tallahassee, FL	Xavier
Isis Johnson-Musah	6	Forward	5'10"	Sophomore	Detroit, MI	California
Jazlyn Harris	11	Guard	5'8"	(redshirt) Sophomore	Charlotte, NC	Chipola College (NJCAA)
Destinee Salgado	14	Forward	6'3"	Junior	Stafford, VA	Little Rock
Charish Thompson	32	Forward	6'0"	Sophomore	Sachse, TX	Cal Poly

=== Recruiting class ===
There was no 2026 recruiting class.

== Preseason ==
On October 9, 2026, the American Conference released its annual preseason coaches poll and awards. Charlotte was picked to finish tenth in the conference.

=== Preseason rankings ===
American Preseason Poll
Place	Team	Votes
1	Rice	142 (10)
2	UTSA	125 (2)
3	South Florida	121 (1)
4	Tulsa	117
5	Temple	96
6	North Texas	87
7	East Carolina	82
8	Florida Atlantic	60
9	Memphis	54
10	Charlotte	44
11	Tulane	41
12	UAB	26
13	Wichita State	26
(#) first-place votes

=== Preseason All-Conference Teams ===
No players were named to the Preseason All-Conference First or Second Team.

== Roster ==
2026–27 Charlotte 49ers women's basketball team
Players
Coaches

Pos.	#	Name	Height	Year	Previous school	Hometown
G	0	Zoe Best	5 ft 10 in (1.78 m)	So	Incarnate Word Academy; Southeast Missouri State	St. Louis, MO
G	1	Da'Brya Clark	5 ft 9 in (1.75 m)	Sr	Baltimore Polytechnic Institute; Norfolk State	Baltimore, MD
G	2	Audia Young	5 ft 9 in (1.75 m)	RS Sr	Florida High School; Norfolk State	Tallahassee, FL
G	5	Mariah Sain	5 ft 9 in (1.75 m)	Fr	Muskegon High School	Muskegon, MI
F	6	Isis Johnson-Musah	5 ft 10 in (1.78 m)	So	Edison Academy; California	Detroit, MI
G	7	Taliah Cornish	5 ft 7 in (1.7 m)	Jr	Maynard H. Jackson High School; South Plains College	Atlanta, GA
F	8	Ja'Navia Gage	6 ft 3 in (1.91 m)	Jr	Gulf Coast State College	Huntsville, TX
G	11	Jazlyn Harris	5 ft 8 in (1.73 m)	RS So	Quality Education Academy; Chipola College	Charlotte, NC
F	12	Alana Rouser	6 ft 0 in (1.83 m)	Jr	Germantown High School; Florida Atlantic	Madison, MS
F	14	Destinee Salgado	6 ft 3 in (1.91 m)	Jr	North Stafford High School; Little Rock	Stafford, VA
C	15	Venus Emusi	6 ft 4 in (1.93 m)	Fr		Madrid, Spain
G/F	22	Caroline Thiel	6 ft 0 in (1.83 m)	Sr	Rocky Mount High School	Rocky Mount, NC
G	23	McKenzie Graves	5 ft 8 in (1.73 m)	Fr	NC GGB Academy	Durham, NC
F	32	Charish Thompson	6 ft 0 in (1.83 m)	So	Sachse High School; Cal Poly	Sachse, TX

Head coach

- Tomekia Reed (Georgia Southwestern State)

Assistant coach(es)

- LaShonda Cousin (Mississippi State)
- Chase Campbell (Paine College)
- Aaron A. Swinson (Auburn)

Legend

- (C) Team captain
- (S) Suspended
- (I) Ineligible
- (W) Walk-on
- Injured
- Current redshirt

Roster
Last update: October 20, 2026

== Schedule and results ==
Date time, TV	Rank^{#}	Opponent^{#}	Result	Record	High points	High rebounds	High assists	Site (attendance) city, state
Non-conference regular season
November 2, 2026*; 7:00 p.m.		Richmond						Dale F. Halton Arena; Charlotte, NC
November 5, 2026*; TBA		at Texas Tech						United Supermarkets Arena; Lubbock, TX
November 9, 2026*; 7:00 p.m.		Longwood						Dale F. Halton Arena; Charlotte, NC
November 18, 2026*; 7:00 p.m.		Wofford						Dale F. Halton Arena; Charlotte, NC
November 21, 2026*; 7:00 p.m.		at Davidson						John M. Belk Arena; Davidson, NC
November 27, 2026*; TBA		vs. UCF; Florida Gulf Classic						Community School of Naples; Naples, FL
November 28, 2026*; TBA		vs. Texas A&M; Florida Gulf Classic						Community School of Naples; Naples, FL
December 2, 2026*; 5:30 p.m.		Kennesaw State						Dale F. Halton Arena; Charlotte, NC
December 6, 2026*; TBA		at VCU						Siegel Center; Richmond, VA
December 16, 2026*; 11:00 a.m.		Winthrop						Dale F. Halton Arena; Charlotte, NC
December 20, 2026*; TBA		at East Tennessee State						Brooks Gymnasium; Johnson City, TN
American regular season
December 30, 2026; TBA		at Temple						Liacouras Center; Philadelphia, PA
January 2, 2027; TBA		Tulane						Dale F. Halton Arena; Charlotte, NC
January 7, 2027; TBA		at UAB						Bartow Arena; Birmingham, AL
January 10, 2027; TBA		at Memphis						Elma Roane Fieldhouse; Memphis, TN
January 14, 2027; TBA		South Florida						Dale F. Halton Arena; Charlotte, NC
January 17, 2027; TBA		at Wichita State						Charles Koch Arena; Wichita, KS
January 20, 2027; TBA		at Tulsa						Reynolds Center; Tulsa, OK
January 23, 2027; TBA		Memphis						Dale F. Halton Arena; Charlotte, NC
January 27, 2027; TBA		UTSA						Dale F. Halton Arena; Charlotte, NC
January 31, 2027; TBA		at Rice						Tudor Fieldhouse; Houston, TX
February 6, 2027; TBA		Florida Atlantic						Dale F. Halton Arena; Charlotte, NC
February 10, 2027; TBA		at North Texas						The Super Pit; Denton, TX
February 13, 2027; TBA		at East Carolina						Williams Arena at Minges Coliseum; Greenville, NC
February 16, 2027; TBA		Wichita State						Dale F. Halton Arena; Charlotte, NC
February 21, 2027; TBA		UAB						Dale F. Halton Arena; Charlotte, NC
February 24, 2027; TBA		North Texas						Dale F. Halton Arena; Charlotte, NC
February 27, 2027; TBA		at Tulane						Devlin Fieldhouse; New Orleans, LA
March 6, 2027; TBA		East Carolina						Dale F. Halton Arena; Charlotte, NC
*Non-conference game. ^{#}Rankings from AP Poll. (#) Tournament seedings in parentheses. All times are in Eastern.
