= 2026–27 UTSA Roadrunners women's basketball team =

American college basketball season

2026–27 UTSA Roadrunners women's basketball
- Conference: American Conference
- Record: 2–2 (0–0 American)
- Head coach: Karen Aston (6th season)
- Associate head coach: Cameron Miles
- Assistant coaches: Chantel Govan; Sophia Ramos; Kyra White; Samuel Limehouse
- Home arena: Convocation Center

2026–27 American Conference women's basketball standings
	Conf.				Overall
Team	W		L	PCT	W		L	PCT
Memphis	0	–	0	–	5	–	0	1.000
Rice	0	–	0	–	5	–	0	1.000
South Florida	0	–	0	–	5	–	1	.833
North Texas	0	–	0	–	4	–	1	.800
Tulane	0	–	0	–	4	–	1	.800
Tulsa	0	–	0	–	4	–	1	.800
Temple	0	–	0	–	3	–	1	.750
UAB	0	–	0	–	3	–	1	.750
Charlotte	0	–	0	–	2	–	2	.500
UTSA	0	–	0	–	2	–	2	.500
Wichita State	0	–	0	–	2	–	3	.400
Florida Atlantic	0	–	0	–	2	–	4	.333
East Carolina	0	–	0	–	1	–	3	.250
† 2027 American tournament winner As of November 21, 2026

The 2026–27 UTSA Roadrunners women's basketball team currently represents the University of Texas at San Antonio (UTSA) during the 2026–27 NCAA Division I women's basketball season. The Roadrunners, led by sixth-year head coach Karen Aston, play their home games at the Convocation Center in San Antonio, Texas, and compete as a member of the American Athletic Conference.

== Previous season ==
The Roadrunners finished the 2025–26 season 18–16 overall and 9–9 in American play, finishing sixth in the conference. As the No. 6 seed in the American tournament, they saw an unprecedented run as they defeated No. 7 Temple in the second round, before completing three straight upsets against No. 3 South Florida, No. 2 East Carolina and top-seeded Rice, defeating the Owls 54–40 in the championship game to claim the conference title for the first time since joining in 2024, and earning the automatic bid to the NCAA tournament for their first appearance since 2006.

In addition to defeating them for the championship, the Roadrunners handed Rice their only defeat in conference play, winning 61–52 on the road in the regular season finale on March 7.

In the NCAA tournament, UTSA were seeded No. 16 in the Fort Worth #1 Regional. They were eliminated in the first round after losing 52–90 to undefeated and tournament top seed UConn to end their season.

== Offseason ==
=== Departures ===
UTSA departures
Name	Num.	Pos.	Height	Year	Hometown	Reason for departure
Sienna Guttadauro	1	Guard	5'6"	(redshirt) Junior	San Jose, CA	Transferred to Weber State
Ereaunna Hardaway	2	Guard	5'8"	Senior	Jonesboro, AR	Graduated
Saher Alizada	3	Guard	5'10"	Junior	Montreal, Quebec	Transferred to Purdue Northwest (D-II)
Nyayongah Gony	7	Forward	6'4"	(redshirt) Senior	Lincoln, NE	Entered transfer portal
Jayda Holiman	11	Guard	5'6"	Junior	McAlester, OK	Transferred to North Texas
Cheyenne Rowe	21	Forward	6'2"	Senior	Ajax, Ontario	Graduated
Emilia Dannebauer	33	Forward/Center	6'4"	Sophomore	Berlin, Germany	Transferred to UAB

=== Incoming transfers ===
UTSA incoming transfers
Name	Num.	Pos.	Height	Year	Hometown	Previous school
Kierra Merchant	2	Guard	5'9"	Senior	Houston, TX	Houston
Bhret Clay	14	Guard	5'9"	Sophomore	Hobbs, NM	Air Force
Praise Egharevba	21	Forward/Center	6'3"	(redshirt) Senior	Bremen, Germany	Oklahoma State
Emily Hunter	44	Center	6'7"	Sophomore	Nolensville, TN	TCU

=== Recruiting class ===
There was no 2026 recruiting class.

== Preseason ==
On October 9, 2026, the American Conference released its annual preseason coaches poll and awards. UTSA was picked to finish second in the conference, along with two first place votes.

=== Preseason rankings ===
American Preseason Poll
Place	Team	Votes
1	Rice	142 (10)
2	UTSA	125 (2)
3	South Florida	121 (1)
4	Tulsa	117
5	Temple	96
6	North Texas	87
7	East Carolina	82
8	Florida Atlantic	60
9	Memphis	54
10	Charlotte	44
11	Tulane	41
12	UAB	26
13	Wichita State	26
(#) first-place votes

=== Preseason All-Conference Teams ===
Preseason All-Conference Teams
Player	Year	Position	Team
Idara Udo	Senior	Forward	First

== Roster ==
2026–27 UTSA Roadrunners women's basketball team
Players
Coaches

Pos.	#	Name	Height	Year	Previous school	Hometown
F	0	Sema Udo	6 ft 0 in (1.83 m)	So	Plano East Senior High School	Plano, TX
G	2	Kierra Merchant	5 ft 9 in (1.75 m)	Sr	Westfield High School; Houston	Houston, TX
G	3	Jana Ros	5 ft 5 in (1.65 m)	Fr	Escola Pia Santa Anna	Mataró, Spain
G	4	Damara Allen	5 ft 10 in (1.78 m)	Jr	Cherokee Trail High School	Aurora, CO
G	5	Mia Hammonds	6 ft 3 in (1.91 m)	Jr	Steele High School	Cibolo, TX
F/C	7	Amaya McDonald	6 ft 2 in (1.88 m)	Fr	Braswell High School	Shreveport, LA
G	8	Rihyana Kinsey	5 ft 9 in (1.75 m)	Fr	La Vega High School	Waco, TX
F	10	Sanaa Bean	6 ft 3 in (1.91 m)	So	Edna Karr High School	New Orleans, LA
F	13	Taylor Ross	6 ft 1 in (1.85 m)	RS So	Brennan High School	San Antonio, TX
G	14	Bhret Clay	5 ft 9 in (1.75 m)	So	Hobbs High School; Air Force	Hobbs, NM
G	15	Marie Han	5 ft 3 in (1.6 m)	Jr	Vista Ridge High School; Fort Scott CC	Austin, TX
G	16	Adriana Robles	5 ft 5 in (1.65 m)	So	Fossil Ridge High School	Arecibo, PR
F	20	Maya Linton	5 ft 11 in (1.8 m)	RS Sr	Duncanville High School	Duncanville, TX
F/C	21	Praise Egharevba	6 ft 3 in (1.91 m)	RS Sr	Nottingham Academy; Oklahoma State	Bremen, Germany
F	25	Idara Udo	6 ft 1 in (1.85 m)	Sr	Plano East High School	Plano, TX
C	44	Emily Hunter	6 ft 7 in (2.01 m)	So	TPLS Christian Academy; TCU	Nolensville, TN

Head coach

- Karen Aston (Little Rock)

Assistant coach(es)

- Cameron Miles (San Diego)
- Chantel Govan (Texas–San Antonio)
- Sophia Ramos (San Diego State)
- Kyra White (Texas–San Antonio)
- Samuel Limehouse (Southern Wesleyan)

Legend

- (C) Team captain
- (S) Suspended
- (I) Ineligible
- (W) Walk-on
- Injured
- Current redshirt

Roster

== Schedule and results ==
Date time, TV	Rank^{#}	Opponent^{#}	Result	Record	High points	High rebounds	High assists	Site (attendance) city, state
Non-conference regular season
November 6, 2026*; 8:30 p.m., MW+		at UNLV	L 51–69	0–1	17 – Allen	7 – Tied	2 – Tied	Cox Pavilion (983); Las Vegas, NV
November 8, 2026*; 3:00 p.m., YouTube		at San Diego State	L 56–65	0–2	13 – Allen	7 – Ross	2 – Tied	Viejas Arena (1,194); San Diego, CA
November 11, 2026*; 11:00 a.m., ESPN+		Incarnate Word	W 73–51	1–2	15 – Tied	7 – Hammonds	4 – Robles	Convocation Center (738); San Antonio, TX
November 16, 2026*; 6:30 p.m., ESPN+		Louisiana						Convocation Center; San Antonio, TX
November 21, 2026*; 12:00 p.m., ESPN+		North Dakota State						Convocation Center; San Antonio, TX
November 26, 2026*; 1:00 p.m.		vs. Binghamton; Puerto Rico Clasico						Coliseo Rubén Rodríguez; San Juan, PR
November 27, 2026*; 2:00 p.m.		vs. Howard; Puerto Rico Clasico						Coliseo Rubén Rodríguez; San Juan, PR
December 6, 2026*; 2:00 p.m., ESPN+		at Baylor						Foster Pavilion; Waco, TX
December 10, 2026*; 6:30 p.m., ESPN+		at TCU						Schollmaier Arena; Fort Worth, TX
December 16, 2026*; 5:00 p.m., YouTube		at Texas State						Strahan Arena; San Marcos, TX
December 20, 2026*; 3:00 p.m., ACC Network		at SMU						Moody Coliseum; Dallas, TX
American regular season
December 30, 2026; 6:00 p.m., ESPN+		at Florida Atlantic						Eleanor R. Baldwin Arena; Boca Raton, FL
January 2, 2027; 1:00 p.m., ESPN+		at South Florida						Yuengling Center; Tampa, FL
January 6, 2027; 6:30 p.m., ESPN+		North Texas						Convocation Center; San Antonio, TX
January 10, 2027; 2:00 p.m., ESPN+		Wichita State						Convocation Center; San Antonio, TX
January 13, 2027; 6:30 p.m., ESPN+		at Tulsa						Reynolds Center; Tulsa, OK
January 16, 2027; 2:00 p.m., ESPN+		Rice						Convocation Center; San Antonio, TX
January 24, 2027; 2:00 p.m., ESPN+		UAB						Convocation Center; San Antonio, TX
January 27, 2027; 6:00 p.m., ESPN+		at Charlotte						Halton Arena; Charlotte, NC
January 30, 2027; 1:00 p.m., ESPN+		at East Carolina						Williams Arena at Minges Coliseum; Greenville, NC
February 3, 2027; 6:30 p.m., ESPN+		Tulsa						Convocation Center; San Antonio, TX
February 6, 2027; 2:00 p.m., ESPN+		Temple						Convocation Center; San Antonio, TX
February 10, 2027; 6:00 p.m., ESPN+		at Memphis						Elma Roane Fieldhouse; Memphis, TN
February 13, 2027; 2:00 p.m., ESPN+		at North Texas						The Super Pit; Denton, TX
February 17, 2027; 6:30 p.m., ESPN+		South Florida						Convocation Center; San Antonio, TX
February 20, 2027; 2:00 p.m., ESPN+		East Carolina						Convocation Center; San Antonio, TX
February 27, 2027; 2:00 p.m., ESPN+		at Rice						Tudor Fieldhouse; Houston, TX
March 3, 2027; 6:30 p.m., ESPN+		Florida Atlantic						Convocation Center; San Antonio, TX
March 6, 2027; 2:00 p.m., ESPN+		at Tulane						Devlin Fieldhouse; New Orleans, LA
*Non-conference game. ^{#}Rankings from AP Poll. (#) Tournament seedings in parentheses. All times are in Central.
