= 2026–27 Tulane Green Wave women's basketball team =

American college basketball season

2026–27 Tulane Green Wave women's basketball
- Conference: American Conference
- Record: 1–1 (0–0 American)
- Head coach: Ashley Langford (3rd season)
- Assistant coaches: Sam Pierce; Donnie Stith; Harlyn Wyatt; Shyan Mwai; Jamia Hazell
- Home arena: Devlin Fieldhouse

2026–27 American Conference women's basketball standings
	Conf.				Overall
Team	W		L	PCT	W		L	PCT
Memphis	0	–	0	–	3	–	0	1.000
Rice	0	–	0	–	3	–	0	1.000
UAB	0	–	0	–	3	–	0	1.000
North Texas	0	–	0	–	2	–	1	.667
South Florida	0	–	0	–	2	–	1	.667
Temple	0	–	0	–	2	–	1	.667
Florida Atlantic	0	–	0	–	2	–	2	.500
Tulane	0	–	0	–	1	–	1	.500
Tulsa	0	–	0	–	1	–	1	.500
Charlotte	0	–	0	–	1	–	2	.333
East Carolina	0	–	0	–	1	–	2	.333
UTSA	0	–	0	–	1	–	2	.333
Wichita State	0	–	0	–	0	–	3	.000
† 2027 American tournament winner As of November 12, 2026

The 2026–27 Tulane Green Wave women's basketball team currently represents Tulane University during the 2026–27 NCAA Division I women's basketball season. The Green Wave, led by third-year head coach Ashley Langford, play their home games at Devlin Fieldhouse in New Orleans, Louisiana, and compete as a member of the American Conference.

== Previous season ==
The Green Wave finished the 2025–26 season 11–20 overall and 6–12 in American play, finishing tenth in the conference. As the No. 10 seed in the American tournament, they lost in overtime 77–86 to No. 7 Temple in the first round to end their season.

== Offseason ==
=== Departures ===
Tulane departures
Name	Num.	Pos.	Height	Year	Hometown	Reason for departure
Jordyn Weaver	0	Forward	5'11"	Graduate Student	San Antonio, TX	Graduated
Kaylah Hampton	1	Guard	5'9"	Senior	Bossier City, LA	Graduated
Tamiah Robinson	2	Guard	5'9"	Graduate Student	Philadelphia, PA	Graduated
CC Mays	3	Guard	5'8"	Graduate Student	Tampa, FL	Graduated
Jaylee Womack	5	Guard	5'10"	(redshirt) Junior	Springfield, LA	Transferred to Loyola New Orleans (NAIA)
Mecailin Marshall	8	Guard	5'10"	Freshman	Lubbock, TX	Transferred to Colorado
Kendall Sneed	9	Guard	5'8"	Sophomore	China, TX	Transferred to East Carolina
Dyllan Hanna	22	Forward	6'2"	Senior	St. Augustine, FL	Graduated
Amira Mabry	23	Forward	6'0"	Senior	Converse, TX	Graduated

=== Incoming transfers ===
Tulane incoming transfers
Name	Num.	Pos.	Height	Year	Hometown	Previous school
Aizhanique Mayo	2	Guard	5'9"	Graduate Student	Bridgeport, CT	DePaul
Khadee Hession	3	Guard	5'9"	Junior	Miami, FL	Georgetown
Asha Sra	7	Guard	5'9"	Graduate Student	Fresno, CA	Charleston Southern
Nataliyah Gray	22	Forward	6'3"	Sophomore	Houston, TX	Mississippi State
Makayla Carter	23	Forward	6'2"	Sophomore	Tucson, AZ	Nevada
Edina Strausz	26	Forward	6'3"	Junior	Budapest, Hungary	Davidson

=== Recruiting class ===
There was no 2026 recruiting class.

== Preseason ==
On October 9, 2026, the American Conference released its annual preseason coaches poll and awards. Tulane was picked to finish eleventh in the conference.

=== Preseason rankings ===
American Preseason Poll
Place	Team	Votes
1	Rice	142 (10)
2	UTSA	125 (2)
3	South Florida	121 (1)
4	Tulsa	117
5	Temple	96
6	North Texas	87
7	East Carolina	82
8	Florida Atlantic	60
9	Memphis	54
10	Charlotte	44
11	Tulane	41
12	UAB	26
13	Wichita State	26
(#) first-place votes

=== Preseason All-Conference Teams ===
Preseason All-Conference Teams
Player	Year	Position	Team
Kanija Daniel	Senior	Guard	Second

== Roster ==
2026–27 Tulane Green Wave women's basketball team
Players
Coaches

Pos.	#	Name	Height	Year	Previous school	Hometown
G	0	Ja'Kyah Smith	5 ft 8 in (1.73 m)	Fr	Bob Jones High School	Huntsville, AL
G	1	Kennedy Simpson	5 ft 8 in (1.73 m)	Fr	Summer Creek High School	Houston, TX
G	2	Aizhanique Mayo	5 ft 9 in (1.75 m)	GS	Notre Dame Catholic High School; DePaul	Bridgeport, CT
G	3	Khadee Hession	5 ft 9 in (1.75 m)	Jr	St. Thomas Aquinas High School; Georgetown	Miami, FL
G	7	Asha Sra	5 ft 9 in (1.75 m)	GS	Clovis North High School; Charleston Southern	Fresno, CA
G	11	Jayda Brown	6 ft 0 in (1.83 m)	Sr	Forest Park High School; St. John's	Atlanta, GA
G	21	Kanija Daniel	5 ft 10 in (1.78 m)	Sr	Carrollton High School; Chipola College	Carrollton, GA
F	22	Nataliyah Gray	6 ft 3 in (1.91 m)	So	Alief Taylor High School; Mississippi State	Houston, TX
F	23	Makayla Carter	6 ft 2 in (1.88 m)	So	Mountain View High School; Nevada	Tucson, AZ
G	24	Shiloh Kimpson	5 ft 6 in (1.68 m)	So	Little Elm High School	Little Elm, TX
F	26	Edina Strauz	6 ft 3 in (1.91 m)	Jr	Winston-Salem Christian School; Davidson	Budapest, Hungary
F	32	Madison Gordon	6 ft 2 in (1.88 m)	So	Bishop O'Dowd High School	Oakland, CA
G	33	Sadie Shores	5 ft 10 in (1.78 m)	Jr	Woodgrove High School	Purcellville, VA

Head coach

- Ashley Langford (Tulane)

Assistant coach(es)

- Sam Pierce (Slippery Rock)
- Donnie Stith (Tulane)
- Harlyn Wyatt (Tulane)
- Shyan Mwai (Long Island)
- Jamia Hazell (James Madison)

Legend

- (C) Team captain
- (S) Suspended
- (I) Ineligible
- (W) Walk-on
- Injured
- Current redshirt

Roster
Last update: October 23, 2026

== Schedule and results ==
Date time, TV	Rank^{#}	Opponent^{#}	Result	Record	High points	High rebounds	High assists	Site (attendance) city, state
Exhibition
October 27, 2026*; 6:30 p.m.		Loyola New Orleans	W 81-51		–	–	–	Devlin Fieldhouse; New Orleans, LA
Non-conference regular season
November 2, 2026*; 4:00 p.m., ESPN+		Texas Southern	W 92-38	1-0	17 – Brown	7 – Daniel	6 – Sra	Devlin Fieldhouse (902); New Orleans, LA
November 8, 2026*; 12:00 p.m., ESPN2		Alabama	L 63–68	1–1	19 – Hession	13 – Strausz	4 – Tied	Devlin Fieldhouse (962); New Orleans, LA
November 12, 2026*; 6:30 p.m., ESPN+		LSU New Orleans						Devlin Fieldhouse; New Orleans, LA
November 16, 2026*; 6:30 p.m., ESPN+		McNeese						Devlin Fieldhouse; New Orleans, LA
November 20, 2026*; 11:00 a.m., ESPN+		Alcorn State						Devlin Fieldhouse; New Orleans, LA
November 27, 2026*; 11:15 a.m.		vs. Missouri; Daytona Beach Classic						Ocean Center; Daytona Beach, FL
November 28, 2026*; 10:00 a.m.		vs. Maine; Daytona Beach Classic						Ocean Center; Daytona Beach, FL
December 2, 2026*; 5:30 p.m., ESPN+		at UCF						Addition Financial Arena; Orlando, FL
December 9, 2026*; 7:00 p.m., ESPN+		Southeastern Louisiana						Devlin Fieldhouse; New Orleans, LA
December 13, 2026*; 2:00 p.m., ESPN+		Louisiana						Devlin Fieldhouse; New Orleans, LA
December 19, 2026*; 12:00 p.m., ESPN+		Stonehill; Tulane Holiday Classic						Devlin Fieldhouse; New Orleans, LA
December 20, 2026*; TBA, ESPN+		Arkansas–Pine Bluff or Texas State; Tulane Holiday Classic						Devlin Fieldhouse; New Orleans, LA
American regular season
December 30, 2026; 6:30 p.m., ESPN+		Wichita State						Devlin Fieldhouse; New Orleans, LA
January 2, 2027; 3:00 p.m., ESPN+		at Charlotte						Halton Arena; Charlotte, NC
January 9, 2027; 1:00 p.m., ESPN+		at East Carolina						Williams Arena at Minges Coliseum; Greenville, NC
January 13, 2027; 6:30 p.m., ESPN+		UAB						Devlin Fieldhouse; New Orleans, LA
January 16, 2027; 2:00 p.m., ESPN+		Florida Atlantic						Devlin Fieldhouse; New Orleans, LA
January 20, 2027; 6:00 p.m., ESPN+		at Memphis						Elma Roane Fieldhouse; Memphis, TN
January 23, 2027; 2:00 p.m., ESPN+		at North Texas						The Super Pit; Denton, TX
January 27, 2027; 6:30 p.m., ESPN+		Rice						Devlin Fieldhouse; New Orleans, LA
January 30, 2027; 2:00 p.m., ESPN+		Temple						Devlin Fieldhouse; New Orleans, LA
February 3, 2027; 6:00 p.m., ESPN+		at Florida Atlantic						Eleanor R. Baldwin Arena; Boca Raton, FL
February 6, 2027; 1:00 p.m., ESPN+		at South Florida						Yuengling Center; Tampa, FL
February 13, 2027; 2:00 p.m., ESPN+		Memphis						Devlin Fieldhouse; New Orleans, LA
February 17, 2027; 6:30 p.m., ESPN+		North Texas						Devlin Fieldhouse; New Orleans, LA
February 21, 2027; 3:00 p.m., ESPN+		at Wichita State						Charles Koch Arena; Wichita, KS
February 24, 2027; 6:30 p.m., ESPN+		at Tulsa						Donald W. Reynolds Center; Tulsa, OK
February 27, 2027; 2:00 p.m., ESPN+		Charlotte						Devlin Fieldhouse; New Orleans, LA
March 3, 2027; 6:00 p.m., ESPN+		at UAB						Bartow Arena; Birmingham, AL
March 6, 2027; 2:00 p.m., ESPN+		UTSA						Devlin Fieldhouse; New Orleans, LA
*Non-conference game. ^{#}Rankings from AP Poll. (#) Tournament seedings in parentheses. All times are in Central.
