= 2026–27 Tulsa Golden Hurricane women's basketball team =

American college basketball season

2026–27 Tulsa Golden Hurricane women's basketball
- Conference: American Conference
- Record: 2–1 (0–0 American)
- Head coach: Angie Nelp (6th season)
- Associate head coach: Doug Brotherton
- Assistant coaches: Taylor Reed; Jewelyn Huth; Jim McDonnell; Brett Haden
- Home arena: Reynolds Center

2026–27 American Conference women's basketball standings
	Conf.				Overall
Team	W		L	PCT	W		L	PCT
Memphis	0	–	0	–	4	–	0	1.000
Rice	0	–	0	–	4	–	0	1.000
UAB	0	–	0	–	3	–	0	1.000
South Florida	0	–	0	–	4	–	1	.800
North Texas	0	–	0	–	3	–	1	.750
Tulsa	0	–	0	–	3	–	1	.750
Temple	0	–	0	–	2	–	1	.667
Tulane	0	–	0	–	2	–	1	.667
Florida Atlantic	0	–	0	–	2	–	3	.400
Charlotte	0	–	0	–	1	–	2	.333
UTSA	0	–	0	–	1	–	2	.333
East Carolina	0	–	0	–	1	–	3	.250
Wichita State	0	–	0	–	1	–	3	.250
† 2027 American tournament winner As of November 16, 2026

The 2026–27 Tulsa Golden Hurricane women's basketball team currently represents the University of Tulsa during the 2025–26 NCAA Division I women's basketball season. The Golden Hurricane, led by sixth-year head coach Angie Nelp, play their home games at the Reynolds Center in Tulsa, Oklahoma, and compete as a member of the American Conference.

== Previous season ==
The Golden Hurricane finished the 2025–26 season 19–12 overall and 11–7 in American play, finishing in a tie for fourth in the conference with North Texas. As the No. 4 seed in the American tournament, they earned a bye to the quarterfinals, where they fell 73–76 to the No. 5 seeded Mean Green to end their season.

== Offseason ==
=== Departures ===
Tulsa departures
Name	Num.	Pos.	Height	Year	Hometown	Reason for departure
Abby Jegede	4	Guard	5'10"	(redshirt) Junior	Toronto, ON	Transferred to Charleston
Brynn Eshoo	6	Forward	6'2"	(redshirt) Freshman	Inverness, IL	Transferred to New Mexico
Layla-J Cameron	11	Guard	6'0"	Junior	Gold Coast, Australia	Transferred to Central Arkansas
Hannah Riddick	17	Forward	6'1"	(redshirt) Senior	Calgary, AB	Graduated
Shamaryah Duncan	20	Guard	5'11"	(redshirt) Senior	Waco, TX	Graduated
Josie Megehee	21	Guard	5'9"	Freshman	Shawnee, OK	Transferred to Kansas City

=== Incoming transfers ===
Tulsa incoming transfers
Name	Num.	Pos.	Height	Year	Hometown	Previous school
Alexa Kinas	4	Guard	5'8"	Junior	Kaukauna, WI	Loyola Chicago

=== Recruiting class ===
There was no 2026 recruiting class.

== Preseason ==
On October 9, 2026, the American Conference released its annual preseason coaches poll and awards. Tulsa was picked to finish fourth in the conference.

=== Preseason rankings ===
American Preseason Poll
Place	Team	Votes
1	Rice	142 (10)
2	UTSA	125 (2)
3	South Florida	121 (1)
4	Tulsa	117
5	Temple	96
6	North Texas	87
7	East Carolina	82
8	Florida Atlantic	60
9	Memphis	54
10	Charlotte	44
11	Tulane	41
12	UAB	26
13	Wichita State	26
(#) first-place votes

=== Preseason All-Conference Teams ===
Preseason All-Conference Teams
Player	Year	Position	Team
Mady Cartwright	Senior	Guard	First

== Roster ==
2026–27 Tulsa Golden Hurricane women's basketball team
Players
Coaches

Pos.	#	Name	Height	Year	Previous school	Hometown
G	1	Haven Fisher	6 ft 0 in (1.83 m)	So	Prior Lake High School	Prior Lake, MN
F	2	RyLee Grays	6 ft 4 in (1.93 m)	Sr	Pearland High School; Virginia	Pearland, TX
F	3	Camryn Schmidt	6 ft 1 in (1.85 m)	Fr	Northside High School	Fort Smith, AR
G	4	Alexa Kinas	5 ft 8 in (1.73 m)	Jr	Kaukauna High School; Loyola Chicago	Kaukauna, WI
G	5	Alisha Peavy	6 ft 2 in (1.88 m)	So	Pieper High School	San Antonio, TX
G	7	Teresa Seppala	6 ft 0 in (1.83 m)	RS Sr	Mäkelänrinteen Lukio; Siena	Tampere, Finland
G	8	Gina Nikola Pirjak	5 ft 8 in (1.73 m)	RS Fr	Dominis Private School	Jezera, Croatia
F	10	Hadar Cohen	6 ft 3 in (1.91 m)	Fr	Dror High School	Pardesiya, Israel
G	11	Jaelynn Scott	6 ft 0 in (1.83 m)	Fr	Wachusett Regional High School	Holden, MA
F	15	Jade Clack	6 ft 1 in (1.85 m)	Sr	Austin High School; TCU	Buda, TX
G	22	Mady Cartwright	5 ft 10 in (1.78 m)	Sr	Greenwood High School	Greenwood, AR
G	23	McKenzie Jones	5 ft 10 in (1.78 m)	Fr	Springboro High School	Springboro, OH
F	31	Laura Di Stefano	6 ft 2 in (1.88 m)	Sr	Liceo Orazio; Salt Lake CC	Rome, Italy
G	33	Dora Toman	6 ft 0 in (1.83 m)	So	Soproni Széchenyi István Gimnázium	Budapest, Hungary

Head coach

- Angie Nelp (Colorado State)

Assistant coach(es)

- Doug Brotherton (Central Michigan)
- Taylor Reed (Louisiana Tech)
- Jewelyn Huth (Long Beach State)
- Jim McDonnell (Temple)
- Brett Haden (Texas)

Legend

- (C) Team captain
- (S) Suspended
- (I) Ineligible
- (W) Walk-on
- Injured
- Current redshirt

Roster
Last update: October 23, 2026

== Schedule and results ==
Date time, TV	Rank^{#}	Opponent^{#}	Result	Record	High points	High rebounds	High assists	Site (attendance) city, state
Non-conference regular season
November 3, 2026*; 6:30 p.m., ESPN+		Incarnate Word	L 57–63	0–1	16 – Kinas	9 – Kinas	4 – Cartwright	Reynolds Center (1,191); Tulsa, OK
November 7, 2026*; 2:00 p.m., ESPN+		Rogers State	W 67–40	1–1	9 – Tied	6 – Kinas	2 – Tied	Reynolds Center (1,247); Tulsa, OK
November 12, 2026*; 5:00 p.m., ESPNU		No. 19т Oklahoma State	W 64–62 ^{OT}	2–1	17 – Cartwright	11 – Peavy	6 – Toman	Reynolds Center (2,101); Tulsa, OK
November 15, 2026*; 3:30 p.m., ESPN+		Texas Southern						Reynolds Center; Tulsa, OK
November 18, 2026*; 6:30 p.m.		LSU New Orleans						Reynolds Center; Tulsa, OK
November 22, 2026*; TBA		vs. Stephen F. Austin; Hoopfest Basketball Women's Challenge						Comerica Center; Frisco, TX
November 27, 2026*; TBA		vs. Central Michigan; Florida Gulf Classic						Community School of Naples; Naples, FL
November 28, 2026*; TBA		vs. Bowling Green; Florida Gulf Classic						Community School of Naples; Naples, FL
December 2, 2026*; 11:00 a.m.		Oklahoma Baptist						Reynolds Center; Tulsa, OK
December 5, 2026*; 2:00 p.m.		Oral Roberts						Reynolds Center; Tulsa, OK
December 9, 2026*; 6:30 p.m.		SMU						Reynolds Center; Tulsa, OK
December 13, 2026*; 2:00 p.m.		UT Martin						Reynolds Center; Tulsa, OK
December 20, 2026*; 5:30 p.m., WSN		vs. Middle Tennessee; Cherokee Invitational						Harrah's Cherokee; Cherokee, NC
December 21, 2026*; 3:00 p.m., WSN		vs. Auburn; Cherokee Invitational						Harrah's Cherokee; Cherokee, NC
American regular season
December 31, 2026; TBA		Memphis						Reynolds Center; Tulsa, OK
January 3, 2027; TBA		East Carolina						Reynolds Center; Tulsa, OK
January 6, 2027; TBA		at South Florida						Yuengling Center; Tampa, FL
January 9, 2027; TBA		at Florida Atlantic						Eleanor R. Baldwin Arena; Boca Raton, FL
January 13, 2027; TBA		UTSA						Reynolds Center; Tulsa, OK
January 20, 2027; TBA		Charlotte						Reynolds Center; Tulsa, OK
January 24, 2027; TBA		at Rice						Tudor Fieldhouse; Houston, TX
January 27, 2027; TBA		at North Texas						The Super Pit; Denton, TX
January 30, 2027; TBA		South Florida						Reynolds Center; Tulsa, OK
February 3, 2027; TBA		at UTSA						Convocation Center; San Antonio, TX
February 6, 2027; TBA		Wichita State						Reynolds Center; Tulsa, OK
February 10, 2027; TBA		at Temple						Liacouras Center; Philadelphia, PA
February 13, 2027; TBA		Rice						Reynolds Center; Tulsa, OK
February 17, 2027; TBA		at UAB						Bartow Arena; Birmingham, AL
February 20, 2027; TBA		at Memphis						Elma Roane Fieldhouse; Memphis, TN
February 24, 2027; TBA		Tulane						Reynolds Center; Tulsa, OK
March 3, 2027; TBA		at Wichita State						Charles Koch Arena; Wichita, KS
March 6, 2027; TBA		North Texas						Reynolds Center; Tulsa, OK
*Non-conference game. ^{#}Rankings from AP Poll. (#) Tournament seedings in parentheses. All times are in Central.
