= 2026–27 Temple Owls women's basketball team =

Intercollegiate basketball season

2026–27 Temple Owls women's basketball
- Conference: American Conference
- Record: 0–0 (0–0 American)
- Head coach: Diane Richardson (5th season)
- Associate head coach: Wanisha Smith
- Assistant coaches: Myles Jackson; Cheyenne Curley; Sharay Hill; Aaron Thomas
- Home arena: Liacouras Center

2026–27 American Conference women's basketball standings
	Conf.				Overall
Team	W		L	PCT	W		L	PCT
Rice	0	–	0	–	5	–	0	1.000
Memphis	0	–	0	–	4	–	0	1.000
UAB	0	–	0	–	3	–	0	1.000
South Florida	0	–	0	–	5	–	1	.833
North Texas	0	–	0	–	4	–	1	.800
Tulsa	0	–	0	–	4	–	1	.800
Temple	0	–	0	–	3	–	1	.750
Tulane	0	–	0	–	3	–	1	.750
Charlotte	0	–	0	–	2	–	2	.500
UTSA	0	–	0	–	2	–	2	.500
Florida Atlantic	0	–	0	–	2	–	3	.400
Wichita State	0	–	0	–	2	–	3	.400
East Carolina	0	–	0	–	1	–	3	.250
† 2027 American tournament winner As of November 19, 2026

The 2026–27 Temple Owls women's basketball team will represent Temple University during the 2026–27 NCAA Division I women's basketball season. The Owls, led by fifth-year head coach Diane Richardson, will play their home games at the Liacouras Center in Philadelphia, Pennsylvania, and compete as a member of the American Conference.

== Previous season ==
The Owls finished the 2025–26 season 15–17 overall and 8–10 in American play, finishing in a tie for seventh in the conference with Charlotte. As the No. 7 seed in the American tournament, they defeated No. 10 Tulane 86–77 in overtime in the first round, before falling to eventual tournament champions No. 6 UTSA 51–59 in the second round to end their season.

== Offseason ==
=== Departures ===
Temple departures
Name	Num.	Pos.	Height	Year	Hometown	Reason for departure
Brianna Mead	2	Guard	5'7"	Sophomore	Thompson, CT	Transferred to North Florida
Kelian Cedano	3	Guard	5'10"	Sophomore	Boston, MA	Transferred to Hofstra
Jaleesa Molina	8	Forward	6'3"	Junior	The Hague, Netherlands	Transferred to Syracuse
Felicia Jacobs	9	Forward	6'3"	Sophomore	London, England	Transferred to Hofstra
Savannah Curry	10	Guard	6'0"	Sophomore	Fallston, MD	Transferred to South Florida
Drew Alexander	30	Guard	5'11"	Sophomore	Durham, NC	Transferred to North Carolina A&T
Sheyenne Swain-Price	34	Forward	6'0"	(redshirt) Sophomore	Stoughton, MA	Entered transfer portal (Note: Has not played in any of three seasons at Temple.)

=== Incoming transfers ===
Temple incoming transfers
Name	Num.	Pos.	Height	Year	Hometown	Previous school
Taliyah Logwood	1	Guard	5'10"	Junior	Richmond, CA	Texas Southern
Myla Benton	2	Guard	5'9"	Junior	Atlanta, GA	Gulf Coast State College (NJCAA)
Shayla Smith	8	Guard	5'9"	Sophomore	Philadelphia, PA	Penn State
Timya Grice	22	Forward	6'5"	(redshirt) Sophomore	Greenville, SC	Arizona State

=== Recruiting class ===
There was no 2026 recruiting class.

== Preseason ==
On October 9, 2026, the American Conference released its annual preseason coaches poll and awards. Temple was picked to finish fifth in the conference.

=== Preseason rankings ===
American Preseason Poll
Place	Team	Votes
1	Rice	142 (10)
2	UTSA	125 (2)
3	South Florida	121 (1)
4	Tulsa	117
5	Temple	96
6	North Texas	87
7	East Carolina	82
8	Florida Atlantic	60
9	Memphis	54
10	Charlotte	44
11	Tulane	41
12	UAB	26
13	Wichita State	26
(#) first-place votes

=== Preseason All-Conference Teams ===
Preseason All-Conference Teams
Player	Year	Position	Team
Kaylah Turner	Senior	Guard	First
Saniyah Craig	Junior	Forward	Second

== Roster ==
2026–27 Temple Owls women's basketball team
Players
Coaches

Pos.	#	Name	Height	Year	Previous school	Hometown
F	0	Ariana Meriedy	6 ft 3 in (1.91 m)	So	Riverdale Baptist School	Clinton, MD
G	1	Taliyah Logwood	5 ft 10 in (1.78 m)	Jr	Oakland Tech High School; Texas Southern	Richmond, CA
G	2	Myla Benton	5 ft 9 in (1.75 m)	Jr	Greater Atlanta Christian School; Gulf Coast State College	Atlanta, GA
G	5	Mariah Cross	5 ft 7 in (1.7 m)	Fr	Wayne Memorial High School	Ypsilanti, MI
G	7	Kaylah Turner	5 ft 6 in (1.68 m)	Sr	Oakleaf High School; Alabama A&M	Jacksonville, FL
G	8	Shayla Smith	5 ft 9 in (1.75 m)	So	Audenried High School; Penn State	Philadelphia, PA
G	11	Tristen Taylor	5 ft 5 in (1.65 m)	Sr	Duncanville High School	Dallas, TX
F	18	Anastasia Bulanova	6 ft 3 in (1.91 m)	So	BC Enisey	Novosibirsk, Russia
F	22	Timya Grice	6 ft 5 in (1.96 m)	RS So	James E. Taylor High School; Arizona State	Greenville, SC
G	23	LaBrea Carter	5 ft 7 in (1.7 m)	Fr	Digital Pioneers Academy	Washington, D.C.
F	24	Khloe Miller	6 ft 3 in (1.91 m)	RS So	Wake Young Women's Leadership Academy; East Carolina	Raleigh, NC
F	91	Saniyah Craig	6 ft 1 in (1.85 m)	Sr	Arizona Compass Prep School	Phoenix, AZ

Head coach

- Diane Richardson (Frostburg State)

Assistant coach(es)

- Wanisha Smith (Duke)
- Myles Jackson (Towson)
- Cheyenne Curley (Howard)
- Sharay Hall (Lock Haven)
- Aaron Thomas (Towson)

Legend

- (C) Team captain
- (S) Suspended
- (I) Ineligible
- (W) Walk-on
- Injured
- Current redshirt

Roster
Last update: October 22, 2026

== Schedule and results ==
Date time, TV	Rank^{#}	Opponent^{#}	Result	Record	High points	High rebounds	High assists	Site (attendance) city, state
Non-conference regular season
November 2, 2026*; TBA		at George Mason						EagleBank Arena; Fairfax, VA
November 7, 2026*; TBA		Navy						Liacouras Center; Philadelphia, PA
November 11, 2026*; TBA		at La Salle; Big 5 Women's Classic Pod 2						John Glaser Arena; Philadelphia, PA
November 17, 2026*; TBA		at George Washington						Charles E. Smith Center; Washington, D.C.
November 22, 2026*; TBA		Georgetown						Liacouras Center; Philadelphia, PA
November 24, 2026*; TBA		Ball State						Liacouras Center; Philadelphia, PA
December 1, 2026*; TBA		Villanova; Big 5 Women's Classic Pod 2						Liacouras Center; Philadelphia, PA
December 6, 2026*; TBA		vs. TBD; Big 5 Women's Classic						The Palestra; Philadelphia, PA
December 8, 2026*; TBA		Binghamton						Liacouras Center; Philadelphia, PA
December 13, 2026*; TBA		at St. John's						Carnesecca Arena; Queens, NY
December 17, 2026*; TBA		Cheyney						Liacouras Center; Philadelphia, PA
December 20, 2026*; 1:15 p.m.		vs. Ole Miss; West Palm Beach Classic						Rubin Arena; West Palm Beach, FL
December 21, 2026*; 11:00 a.m.		vs. North Dakota State; West Palm Beach Classic						Rubin Arena; West Palm Beach, FL
American regular season
December 30, 2026; TBA		Charlotte						Liacouras Center; Philadelphia, PA
January 2, 2027; TBA		Rice						Liacouras Center; Philadelphia, PA
January 7, 2027; TBA		at Memphis						Elma Roane Fieldhouse; Memphis, TN
January 10, 2027; TBA		at UAB						Bartow Arena; Birmingham, AL
January 13, 2027; TBA		East Carolina						Liacouras Center; Philadelphia, PA
January 16, 2027; TBA		North Texas						Liacouras Center; Philadelphia, PA
January 20, 2027; TBA		at South Florida						Yuengling Center; Tampa, FL
January 23, 2027; TBA		at Wichita State						Charles Koch Arena; Wichita, KS
January 27, 2027; TBA		UAB						Liacouras Center; Philadelphia, PA
January 30, 2027; TBA		at Tulane						Devlin Fieldhouse; New Orleans, LA
February 6, 2027; TBA		at UTSA						Convocation Center; San Antonio, TX
February 9, 2027; TBA		Tulsa						Liacouras Center; Philadelphia, PA
February 13, 2027; TBA		Wichita State						Liacouras Center; Philadelphia, PA
February 17, 2027; TBA		Florida Atlantic						Liacouras Center; Philadelphia, PA
February 21, 2027; TBA		at North Texas						The Super Pit; Denton, TX
February 24, 2027; TBA		at Rice						Tudor Fieldhouse; Houston, TX
February 27, 2027; TBA		South Florida						Liacouras Center; Philadelphia, PA
March 6, 2027; TBA		at Florida Atlantic						Eleanor R. Baldwin Arena; Boca Raton, FL
*Non-conference game. ^{#}Rankings from AP Poll. (#) Tournament seedings in parentheses. All times are in Eastern.
