= 2026–27 Memphis Tigers women's basketball team =

American college basketball season

2026–27 Memphis Tigers women's basketball
- Conference: American Conference
- Record: 5–0 (0–0 American)
- Head coach: Hana Haden (1st season)
- Assistant coaches: Dexter Jenkins; Tiffany Conner; Dee Anderson; Shanasa Sanders
- Home arena: Elma Roane Fieldhouse

2026–27 American Conference women's basketball standings
	Conf.				Overall
Team	W		L	PCT	W		L	PCT
Memphis	0	–	0	–	5	–	0	1.000
Rice	0	–	0	–	5	–	0	1.000
South Florida	0	–	0	–	5	–	1	.833
North Texas	0	–	0	–	4	–	1	.800
Tulsa	0	–	0	–	4	–	1	.800
Temple	0	–	0	–	3	–	1	.750
Tulane	0	–	0	–	3	–	1	.750
UAB	0	–	0	–	3	–	1	.750
Charlotte	0	–	0	–	2	–	2	.500
UTSA	0	–	0	–	2	–	2	.500
Wichita State	0	–	0	–	2	–	3	.400
Florida Atlantic	0	–	0	–	2	–	4	.333
East Carolina	0	–	0	–	1	–	3	.250
† 2027 American tournament winner As of November 20, 2026

The 2026–27 Memphis Tigers women's basketball team currently represents the University of Memphis during the 2026–27 NCAA Division I women's basketball season. The Tigers, led by first-year head coach Hana Haden, play their home games at the Elma Roane Fieldhouse in Memphis, Tennessee, and compete as a member of the American Conference.

== Previous season ==
The Tigers finished the 2025–26 season 10–22 overall and 4–14 in American play, finishing in a tie for tenth in the conference with UAB. They failed to qualify for the American tournament.

On March 9, two days after the conclusion of the season, it was announced that head coach Alex Simmons had been fired after three seasons with the program, in which she never posted a winning record and went 30–61. On March 26, Hana Haden was announced as the Tigers' new head coach. Most recently, she served for two years as the head coach for Georgia Southern, leading the team to a 23–8 record and the team's first regular season record in 25 years the previous season.

Simmons' final season was riddled with scandals; In early 2026, senior Chaé Harris was dismissed from the team for undisclosed reasons. On March 2, junior forward Paris Gaines was arrested on three counts of aggravated assault and subsequently did not finish the season with the team. She later entered the transfer portal and committed to play for Division II Eastern New Mexico.

== Offseason ==
=== Departures ===
Memphis departures
Name	Number	Pos.	Height	Year	Hometown	Reason for departure
Cori Allen	1	Guard	5'10"	Junior	Nashville, TN	Transferred to Dayton
Chaé Harris	5	Guard	5'8"	Senior	Orlando, FL	Dismissed from team, graduated
Paris Gaines	7	Forward	6'3"	Junior	Orlando, FL	Transferred to Eastern New Mexico (D-II)
Brooklyn Alexander	13	Forward	6'1"	Sophomore	Houston, TX	Transferred to Lamar
Brooklynn Charlo	22	Guard	6'0"	Freshman	Thornton, CO	Transferred to Sacramento State
Jah'Naesia Spears	23	Forward	6'1"	Freshman	Atlanta, GA	Transferred to Mercer
Amauri Williams	32	Forward	6'4"	Senior	North Little Rock, AR	Graduated
Kennedi Alexander	33	Guard	6'1"	Sophomore	Houston, TX	Transferred to Lamar

=== Incoming transfers ===
Memphis incoming transfers
Name	Number	Pos.	Height	Year	Hometown	Previous school
Anjanae Richardson	4	Guard	5'8"	Senior	Portsmouth, VA	Norfolk State
Khyra Garrett	8	Guard	5'11"	Junior	Brownsboro, TX	National Park College (NJCAA)
Tierney Kelsey	11	Guard	5'6"	Junior	Memphis, TN	Indiana State
Lily Melton	13	Guard	5'10"	Junior	Tullahoma, TN	Columbia State CC (NJCAA)
Ainaya Williams	21	Center	6'1"	Junior	St. Louis, MO	Southeast Missouri State
Seda Gabrielyan	30	Guard	5'10"	Sophomore	Yerevan, Armenia	New Mexico State
Destiny Thomas	34	Center	6'4"	5th Year	Jonesboro, AR	Cincinnati

=== Recruiting class ===
There was no 2026 recruiting class.

== Preseason ==
On October 9, 2026, the American Conference released its annual preseason coaches poll and awards. Memphis was picked to finish ninth in the conference.

=== Preseason rankings ===
American Preseason Poll
Place	Team	Votes
1	Rice	142 (10)
2	UTSA	125 (2)
3	South Florida	121 (1)
4	Tulsa	117
5	Temple	96
6	North Texas	87
7	East Carolina	82
8	Florida Atlantic	60
9	Memphis	54
10	Charlotte	44
11	Tulane	41
12	UAB	26
13	Wichita State	26
(#) first-place votes

=== Preseason All-Conference Teams ===
Preseason All-Conference Teams
Player	Year	Position	Team
Daejah Richmond	Senior	Guard	Second
Tamya Smith	Junior	Forward	Second

== Roster ==
Years are listed according to the new NCAA age-based eligibility model.

2026–27 Memphis Tigers women's basketball team
Players
Coaches

Pos.	#	Name	Height	Year	Previous school	Hometown
G	2	Jordan Hunter	5 ft 8 in (1.73 m)	Jr	Hewitt-Trussville High School; Auburn	Birmingham, AL
G	4	Anjanae Richardson	5 ft 8 in (1.73 m)	Sr	Manor High School; Norfolk State	Portsmouth, VA
G	8	Khyra Garrett	5 ft 11 in (1.8 m)	Jr	Brownsboro High School; National Park College	Brownsboro, TX
F	10	Bailey Gilmore	6 ft 3 in (1.91 m)	Sr	Bradwell Institute; Vanderbilt	Midway, GA
G	11	Tierney Kelsey	5 ft 6 in (1.68 m)	Jr	Whitehaven High School; Indiana State	Memphis, TN
G	12	Daejah Richmond	5 ft 8 in (1.73 m)	Sr	First Assembly Christian School; UT Martin	Cordova, TN
G	13	Lily Melton	5 ft 10 in (1.78 m)	Jr	Tullahoma High School; Columbia State CC	Tullahoma, TN
C	21	Ainaya Williams	6 ft 1 in (1.85 m)	Jr	Cardinal Ritter Prep; Southeast Missouri State	St. Louis, MO
F	24	Tamya Smith	6 ft 2 in (1.88 m)	Jr	Pleasant Grove High School	Birmingham, AL
G	30	Seda Gabrielyan	5 ft 10 in (1.78 m)	So	Crestwood Prep; New Mexico State	Yerevan, Armenia
C	32	Aubrey Hampton	6 ft 3 in (1.91 m)	Fr	Cypress Creek High School	Houston, TX
C	35	Destiny Thomas (5th)	6 ft 4 in (1.93 m)	Sr	Jonesboro High School; Cincinnati	Jonesboro, AR

Head coach

- Hana Haden (Western Carolina)

Assistant coach(es)

- Dexter Jenkins (North Carolina Central)
- Tiffany Conner (South Florida)
- Dee Anderson (Florida)
- Shanasa Sanders (Stetson)

Legend

- (C) Team captain
- (S) Suspended
- (I) Ineligible
- (W) Walk-on
- (5th) Fifth year senior
- Injured
- Current redshirt

Roster
Last update: October 16, 2026

== Schedule and results ==
Date time, TV	Rank^{#}	Opponent^{#}	Result	Record	High points	High rebounds	High assists	Site (attendance) city, state
Non-conference regular season
November 2, 2026*; 6:00 p.m., ESPN+		LeMoyne–Owen	W 78–42	1–0	23 – Richardson	9 – Richmond	3 – Richmond	Elma Roane Fieldhouse (792); Memphis, TN
November 6, 2026*; 6:00 p.m., ESPN+		Middle Tennessee	W 47–38	2–0	18 – Richmond	9 – Richardson	1 – Tied	Elma Roane Fieldhouse (894); Memphis, TN
November 9, 2026*; 6:00 p.m., ESPN+		Little Rock	W 62–48	3–0	16 – Smith	10 – Williams	5 – Richmond	Elma Roane Fieldhouse (1,413); Memphis, TN
November 12, 2026*; 6:00 p.m., ESPN+		Alabama	W 75–70	4–0	17 – Smith	12 – Richmond	6 – Richardson	Elma Roane Fieldhouse (1,036); Memphis, TN
November 19, 2026*; 11:00 a.m., ESPN+		South Alabama	W 71–56	5–0	16 – Tied	8 – Richmond	5 – Richmond	Elma Roane Fieldhouse (1,885); Memphis, TN
November 23, 2026; 3:00 p.m.		vs. Old Dominion; Hoopfest Basketball Women's Challenge						Comerica Center; Frisco, TX
November 25, 2026; 3:00 p.m.		vs. SMU; Hoopfest Basketball Women's Challenge						Comerica Center; Frisco, TX
November 29, 2026; 2:00 p.m., ESPN+		at Ole Miss						SJB Pavilion; Oxford, MS
December 3, 2026*; 6:00 p.m., ESPN+		TCU						Elma Roane Fieldhouse; Memphis, TN
December 7, 2026*; 6:30 p.m., ESPN+		at Louisiana Tech						Thomas Assembly Center; Ruston, LA
December 13, 2026*; 2:00 p.m., ESPN+		at Bradley						Renaissance Coliseum; Peoria, IL
December 16, 2026*; 6:00 p.m.		Mississippi Valley State						Elma Roane Fieldhouse; Memphis, TN
December 20, 2026*; 2:00 p.m.		Fisk						Elma Roane Fieldhouse; Memphis, TN
American regular season
December 31, 2026; 2:00 p.m.		at Tulsa						Reynolds Center; Tulsa, OK
January 7, 2027; 6:00 p.m.		Temple						Elma Roane Fieldhouse; Memphis, TN
January 10, 2027; 2:00 p.m.		Charlotte						Elma Roane Fieldhouse; Memphis, TN
January 13, 2027; 6:00 p.m.		Florida Atlantic						Elma Roane Fieldhouse; Memphis, TN
January 16, 2027; 2:00 p.m.		at UAB						Bartow Arena; Birmingham, AL
January 20, 2027; 6:00 p.m.		Tulane						Elma Roane Fieldhouse; Memphis, TN
January 23, 2027; 3:00 p.m.		at Charlotte						Dale F. Halton Arena; Charlotte, NC
January 27, 2027; 5:00 p.m.		at East Carolina						Williams Arena; Greenville, NC
January 30, 2027; 2:00 p.m.		North Texas						Elma Roane Fieldhouse; Memphis, TN
February 3, 2027; 2:00 p.m.		at Wichita State						Charles Koch Arena; Wichita, KS
February 6, 2027; 2:00 p.m.		at Rice						Tudor Fieldhouse; Houston, TX
February 10, 2027; 6:00 p.m.		UTSA						Elma Roane Fieldhouse; Memphis, TN
February 13, 2027; 2:00 p.m.		at Tulane						Devlin Fieldhouse; New Orleans, LA
February 20, 2027; 2:00 p.m.		Tulsa						Elma Roane Fieldhouse; Memphis, TN
February 24, 2027; 6:00 p.m.		Wichita State						Elma Roane Fieldhouse; Memphis, TN
February 27, 2027; 1:00 p.m.		at Florida Atlantic						Eleanor R. Baldwin Arena; Boca Raton, FL
March 2, 2027; 6:00 p.m.		at South Florida						Yuengling Center; Tampa, FL
March 6, 2027; 2:00 p.m.		UAB						Elma Roane Fieldhouse; Memphis, TN
*Non-conference game. ^{#}Rankings from AP Poll. (#) Tournament seedings in parentheses. All times are in Central.
