= 2026–27 North Texas Mean Green women's basketball team =

American college basketball season

2026–27 North Texas Mean Green women's basketball
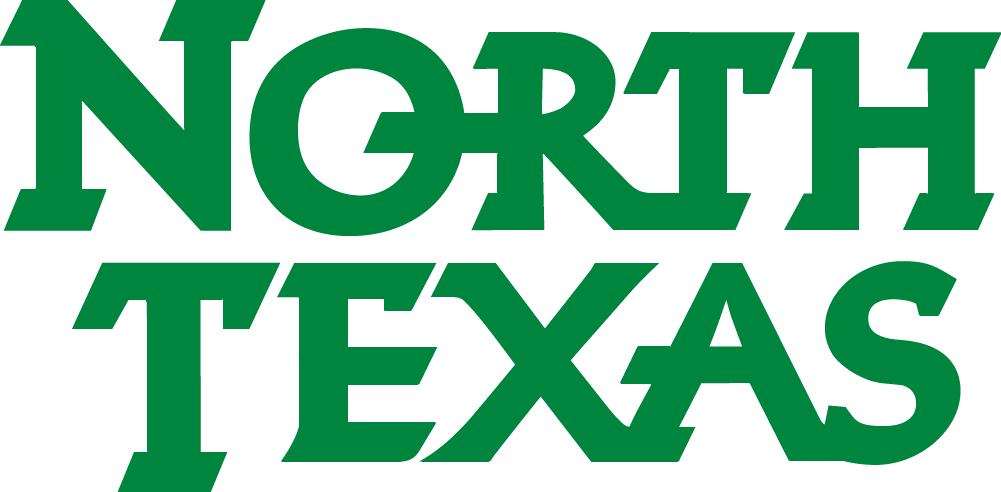
- Conference: American Conference
- Record: 4–1 (0–0 American)
- Head coach: Jason Burton (4th season)
- Associate head coach: Britney Brown
- Assistant coaches: Yannick Denson; Rynae Rasley; Princess Davis; Will Watkins
- Home arena: The Super Pit

2026–27 American Conference women's basketball standings
	Conf.				Overall
Team	W		L	PCT	W		L	PCT
Memphis	0	–	0	–	5	–	0	1.000
Rice	0	–	0	–	5	–	0	1.000
South Florida	0	–	0	–	5	–	1	.833
North Texas	0	–	0	–	4	–	1	.800
Tulane	0	–	0	–	4	–	1	.800
Tulsa	0	–	0	–	4	–	1	.800
Temple	0	–	0	–	3	–	1	.750
UAB	0	–	0	–	3	–	1	.750
Charlotte	0	–	0	–	2	–	2	.500
UTSA	0	–	0	–	2	–	2	.500
Wichita State	0	–	0	–	2	–	3	.400
Florida Atlantic	0	–	0	–	2	–	4	.333
East Carolina	0	–	0	–	1	–	3	.250
† 2027 American tournament winner As of November 22, 2026

The 2026–27 North Texas Mean Green women's basketball team currently represents the University of North Texas during the 2026–27 NCAA Division I women's basketball season. The Mean Green, led by fourth-year head coach Jason Burton, play their home games at The Super Pit in Denton, Texas, and compete as a member of the American Conference.

On November 18, 2026, in a 144–20 win over Division III Saint Francis (PA), the Mean Green broke the NCAA record for most steals in a game, with 57. They also set a program record for most points scored in a game, as well as the fifth highest-scoring game in Division I women's college basketball history.

== Previous season ==
The Mean Green finished the 2025–26 season 19–14 overall and 11–7 in American play, finishing in a tie for fourth in the conference with Tulsa. As the No. 5 seed in the American tournament, they routed No. 9 Florida Atlantic 80–57 in the second round and narrowly defeated the No. 4 Golden Hurricane 76–73 in the quarterfinals, advancing to the semifinals where they lost to top-seeded Rice 67–71 to end their season.

== Offseason ==
=== Departures ===
North Texas departures
Name	Num.	Pos.	Height	Year	Hometown	Reason for departure
Andi Schissler	1	Guard	5'10"	Junior	Kersey, CO	TBD; not listed on roster
Tiffany Hammond	2	Guard	5'8"	Senior	Trenton, NJ	Left team
Jazzy Owens-Barnett	3	Guard	5'7"	Senior	Plano, TX	Transferred to Akron
Mekhia Chase	5	Guard	5'7"	Junior	California, MD	Transferred to Fresno State
Megan Nestor	10	Forward	6'4"	Senior	Castries, St. Lucia	Graduated, signed a training camp contract with the WNBA's Chicago Sky
Laynee Stanley	11	Forward	6'0"	Freshman	Teresita, OK	Transferred to Northeastern State (D-II) (Note: Did not play in the 2025–26 season due to injury.)
Aysia Proctor	12	Guard	5'8"	Junior	Schertz, TX	Transferred to Purdue
Tionna Lidge	21	Forward	6'4"	Senior	El Paso, TX	Graduated
Adhel Tac	23	Forward	6'0"	Senior	Garland, TX	Graduated
Jaelyn Talley	33	Forward	5'10"	Senior	Fairfax, VA	Graduated

=== Incoming transfers ===
North Texas incoming transfers
Name	Num.	Pos.	Height	Year	Hometown	Previous school
Otaifo Esenabhalu	0	Forward	6'1"	Senior	Valdosta, GA	Longwood
Kendall Mosley	5	Guard	5'11"	Sophomore	Prosper, TX	San Diego State
Kalysta Martin	7	Guard	6'2"	Junior	San Antonio, TX	Texas Tech
Taylor Rietveld	11	Forward	6'2"	Junior	Woodbine, GA	Chipola (NJCAA)
KaMyra Barber	13	Guard	5'8"	Sophomore	Wichita, KS	Hutchinson CC (NJCAA)
Reza Po	20	Guard	5'2"	Junior	San Bruno, CA	East Texas A&M

=== Recruiting class ===
There was no 2026 recruiting class.

== Preseason ==
On October 9, 2026, the American Conference released its annual preseason coaches poll and awards. North Texas was picked to finish sixth in the conference.

=== Preseason rankings ===
American Preseason Poll
Place	Team	Votes
1	Rice	142 (10)
2	UTSA	125 (2)
3	South Florida	121 (1)
4	Tulsa	117
5	Temple	96
6	North Texas	87
7	East Carolina	82
8	Florida Atlantic	60
9	Memphis	54
10	Charlotte	44
11	Tulane	41
12	UAB	26
13	Wichita State	26
(#) first-place votes

=== Preseason All-Conference Teams ===
No players were named to the Preseason All-Conference First or Second Team.

== Roster ==
2026–27 North Texas Mean Green women's basketball team
Players
Coaches

Pos.	#	Name	Height	Year	Previous school	Hometown
F	0	Otaifo Esenabhalu	6 ft 1 in (1.85 m)	Sr	Lowndes High School; Longwood	Valdosta, GA
F	2	Arianna Johnson	6 ft 4 in (1.93 m)	Fr	Monterey High School	Lubbock, TX
G	3	Kyndal Graham	5 ft 4 in (1.63 m)	Fr	Huntington High School	Shreveport, LA
G	5	Kendall Mosley	5 ft 11 in (1.8 m)	So	Prosper High School; San Diego State	Prosper, TX
G	7	Kalysta Martin	6 ft 2 in (1.88 m)	Jr	Providence Catholic School; Texas Tech	San Antonio, TX
G	10	Bralyah Miller	5 ft 10 in (1.78 m)	Fr	Lincoln High School	Tyler, TX
F	11	Taylor Rietveld	6 ft 2 in (1.88 m)	Jr	Camden County High School; Chipola College	Woodbine, GA
G	13	KaMyra Barber	5 ft 8 in (1.73 m)	So	Wichita Heights High School; Hutchinson CC	Wichita, KS
F	14	Allison Rickman	6 ft 1 in (1.85 m)	So	Canton High School	Canton, TX
G	15	Cherie Spencer	5 ft 8 in (1.73 m)	So	Northshore High School	Slidell, LA
G	20	Reza Po	5 ft 2 in (1.57 m)	Jr	Sacred Heart Cathedral; East Texas A&M	San Bruno, CA
G	30	Chania Price	5 ft 11 in (1.8 m)	Jr	Brewer High School	Fort Worth, TX
F	32	Shelby Thornton	6 ft 2 in (1.88 m)	So	Del City High School	Oklahoma City, OK

Head coach

- Jason Burton (Austin College)

Assistant coach(es)

- Britney Brown (Oklahoma)
- Yannick Denson (Lamar)
- Rynae Rasley (CCNY)
- Princess Davis (East Texas A&M)
- Will Watkins (UW–Parkside)

Legend

- (C) Team captain
- (S) Suspended
- (I) Ineligible
- (W) Walk-on
- Injured
- Current redshirt

Roster
Last update: October 21, 2026

== Schedule and results ==
Date time, TV	Rank^{#}	Opponent^{#}	Result	Record	High points	High rebounds	High assists	Site (attendance) city, state
Non-conference regular season
November 2, 2026*; 5:30 p.m., ESPN+		Newman	W 101−48	1−0	22 – Spencer	18 – Esenabhalu	5 – Spencer	The Super Pit (1,280); Denton, TX
November 5, 2026*; 1:00 p.m., YouTube		at San Diego State	L 57–73	1–1	11 – Tied	11 – Spencer	6 – Spencer	Viejas Arena (5,090); San Diego, CA
November 11, 2026*; 11:00 a.m., ESPN+		Houston Christian	W 66−57	2−1	18 – Martin	15 – Esenabhalu	4 – Spencer	The Super Pit (1,923); Denton, TX
November 14, 2026*; 2:00 p.m., ESPN+		Incarnate Word	W 75–46	3−1	19 – Price	14 – Esenabhalu	3 – Tied	The Super Pit (557); Denton, TX
November 18, 2026*; 6:30 p.m., ESPN+		Saint Francis (PA)	W 144–20	4−1	20 – Graham	10 – Esenabhalu	6 – Tied	The Super Pit (1,631); Denton, TX
November 22, 2026*; 1:00 p.m.		vs. Arkanasas State; Hoopfest Basketball Women's Challenge						Fifth Third Arena; Frisco, TX
November 24, 2026*; 6:30 p.m.		Dallas						The Super Pit; Denton, TX
November 27, 2026*; 6:30 p.m.		Wofford						The Super Pit; Denton, TX
December 2, 2026*; 6:30 p.m.		Baylor						The Super Pit; Denton, TX
December 5, 2026*; TBA		at Seattle						Redhawk Center; Seattle, WA
December 14, 2026*; 6:30 p.m.		at Oklahoma State						Gallagher-Iba Arena; Stillwater, OK
December 18, 2026*; 6:30 p.m.		Alcorn State						The Super Pit; Denton, TX
December 22, 2026*; 6:30 p.m.		at Northern Colorado						Bank of Colorado Arena; Greeley, CO
American regular season
December 30, 2026; TBA		South Florida						The Super Pit; Denton, TX
January 3, 2027; TBA		Florida Atlantic						The Super Pit; Denton, TX
January 6, 2027; TBA		at UTSA						Convocation Center; San Antonio, TX
January 9, 2027; TBA		at Rice						Tudor Fieldhouse; Houston, TX
January 13, 2027; TBA		Wichita State						The Super Pit; Denton, TX
January 16, 2027; TBA		at Temple						Liacouras Center; Philadelphia, PA
January 23, 2027; TBA		Tulane						The Super Pit; Denton, TX
January 27, 2027; TBA		Tulsa						The Super Pit; Denton, TX
January 30, 2027; TBA		at Memphis						Elma Roane Fieldhouse; Memphis, TN
February 2, 2027; TBA		at UAB						Bartow Arena; Birmingham, AL
February 10, 2027; TBA		Charlotte						The Super Pit; Denton, TX
February 13, 2027; TBA		UTSA						The Super Pit; Denton, TX
February 17, 2027; TBA		at Tulane						Devlin Fieldhouse; New Orleans, LA
February 21, 2027; TBA		Temple						The Super Pit; Denton, TX
February 24, 2027; TBA		at Charlotte						Dale F. Halton Arena; Charlotte, NC
February 27, 2027; TBA		at East Carolina						Williams Arena at Minges Coliseum; Greenville, NC
March 3, 2027; TBA		Rice						The Super Pit; Denton, TX
March 6, 2027; TBA		at Tulsa						Reynolds Center; Tulsa, OK
*Non-conference game. ^{#}Rankings from AP Poll. (#) Tournament seedings in parentheses. All times are in Central.
