= Lebanon High School =

Lebanon High School can refer to more than one educational institution in the United States:

- Lebanon High School (Illinois) — Lebanon, Illinois
- Lebanon High School (Missouri) — Lebanon, Missouri
- Lebanon High School (New Hampshire) — Lebanon, New Hampshire
- Lebanon High School (Ohio) — Lebanon, Ohio
- Lebanon High School (Oregon) — Lebanon, Oregon
- Lebanon High School (Pennsylvania) — Lebanon, Pennsylvania
- Lebanon High School (Tennessee) — Lebanon, Tennessee
- Lebanon High School (Virginia) — Lebanon, Virginia
- Lebanon Senior High School — Lebanon, Indiana
- Mt. Lebanon High School — Pittsburgh, Pennsylvania
- Northern Lebanon High School — Fredericksburg, Pennsylvania
- Eastern Lebanon County High School — Myerstown, Pennsylvania
