= UTSA Roadrunners women's basketball =

2026–27 UTSA Roadrunners women's basketball team
- University: University of Texas at San Antonio
- Head coach: Karen Aston (6th season)
- Location: San Antonio, Texas
- Arena: Convocation Center (capacity: 4,080)
- Conference: American
- Nickname: Roadrunners
- Colors: Navy blue, orange, and white

NCAA Division I tournament appearances
- 2008, 2009, 2026

Conference tournament champions
- 2008, 2009, 2026

Conference regular-season champions
- 2003, 2009, 2011, 2025

Uniforms
Home	Away

The UTSA Roadrunners women's basketball is the team who represents the University of Texas at San Antonio in women's basketball. The school currently competes in the American Conference in Division I of the National Collegiate Athletic Association (NCAA). The Roadrunners play home basketball games at Convocation Center in San Antonio, Texas.

== History ==
As of the end of the 2015–16 season, the Roadrunners have an all-time record of 493–500 since beginning play in 1981. From 1992–2012, they played in the Southland Conference, before joining Conference USA in 2013 after only one year in the Western Athletic Conference.

- The women's basketball team qualified for the 2008 Women's NCAA tournament and 2009 Women's NCAA tournament.
- The women's basketball team wins the regular season Southland Conference (SLC) championship in 2002–03.
- The women's basketball team wins first-ever Southland Conference Championship in 2008.
- The women's basketball team wins Southland Conference regular season Title in 2009.
- The women's basketball team wins Southland Conference Championship in 2009.
- The women's basketball team clinches the 2011 Southland Conference West Division Championship.

== NCAA tournament results ==
Year	Seed	Round	Opponent	Result
2008	#15	First Round	#2 Texas A&M	L 52–91
2009	#15	First Round	#2 Baylor	L 82–87 (OT)
2026	#16	First Round	#1 UConn	L 52-90
