= 2019–20 UTSA Roadrunners women's basketball team =

American college basketball season

2019–20 UTSA Roadrunners women's basketball
- Conference: Conference USA
- West Division
- Record: 6–23 (2–16 CUSA)
- Head coach: Kristen Holt (3rd season)
- Assistant coaches: Adam Esses; Ela Mukosiej; Monique Whaley-Briggs
- Home arena: Convocation Center

2019–20 Conference USA women's basketball standings
	Conf.				Overall
Team	W		L	PCT	W		L	PCT
Rice	16	–	2	.889	21	–	8	.724
Old Dominion	14	–	4	.778	24	–	6	.800
Western Kentucky	14	–	4	.778	22	–	7	.759
Middle Tennessee	13	–	5	.722	21	–	9	.700
UAB	12	–	6	.667	20	–	10	.667
Charlotte	11	–	7	.611	20	–	9	.690
UTEP	8	–	10	.444	15	–	14	.517
Southern Miss	7	–	11	.389	15	–	15	.500
Florida Atlantic	7	–	11	.389	13	–	16	.448
Marshall	7	–	11	.389	13	–	17	.433
Louisiana Tech	6	–	12	.333	14	–	15	.483
North Texas	6	–	12	.333	12	–	18	.400
FIU	3	–	15	.167	6	–	23	.207
UTSA	2	–	16	.111	6	–	23	.207
† 2020 C-USA Tournament winner Rankings from AP poll

The 2019–20 UTSA Roadrunners women's basketball team represented the University of Texas at San Antonio during the 2019–20 NCAA Division I women's basketball season. The team was led by third-year head coach Kristen Holt, and played their home games at the Convocation Center in San Antonio, Texas as a member of Conference USA. They finished the season 6–23, 2–16 in C-USA play, to finish last place. Therefore failing to qualify for the C-USA women's tournament.

== Previous season ==
The Roadrunners finished the season 7–21, 2–14 in C-USA play, to finish in a three-way tie for twelfth place. Due to a tiebreaker loss to Florida Atlantic and FIU, they failed to qualify for the C-USA women's tournament.

== Roster ==
2019–20 UTSA Roadrunners women's basketball team
Players
Coaches

Pos.	#	Name	Height	Year	Previous school	Hometown
F	1	Evelyn Omemmah	6 ft 1 in (1.85 m)	RS Sr	Long Island Lutheran HS; Paris JC	Kakuri, Nigeria
C	3	Elena Blanding	6 ft 5 in (1.96 m)	Fr	Judson HS	Converse, TX
G	4	Mikayla Woods	5 ft 6 in (1.68 m)	Fr	Hendrickson HS	Pflugerville, TX
G	10	Karley Larson	5 ft 7 in (1.7 m)	Fr	Kansas State	Underwood, IA
G	11	Charlene Mass	5 ft 9 in (1.75 m)	Fr	Veterans Memorial HS	Converse, TX
G	13	Deja Cousin	5 ft 9 in (1.75 m)	Sr	The Burlington School	Burlington, NC
F	15	Timea Toth	6 ft 1 in (1.85 m)	Sr	Dunakeszi Radnóti Miklós Gimnázium	Dunakeszi, Hungary
G	22	Ceyenne Mass	5 ft 10 in (1.78 m)	Fr	Karen Wagner HS	Converse, TX
F	23	Tija Hawkins	6 ft 1 in (1.85 m)	Sr	Shoemaker HS	Killeen, TX
F	25	Shannan Mitchell	6 ft 0 in (1.83 m)	Sr	Thornwood HS	South Holland, IL
F	33	Grace Daniels	5 ft 10 in (1.78 m)	Jr	Weatherford College	Arlington, TX
F	30	Adryana Quezada	5 ft 10 in (1.78 m)	Jr	Lone Star HS	Frisco, TX
G	34	Karrington Donald	5 ft 7 in (1.7 m)	Fr	Humble HS	Humble, TX
F	40	Mandi Cooks	6 ft 1 in (1.85 m)	RS Fr	McPherson HS	McPherson, KS

Head coach

- Kristen Holt (Ohio)

Assistant coach(es)

- Adam Esses (Bethany (KS))
- Ela Mukosiej (Seton Hall)
- Stephanie Yowell (Northern Colorado)

Legend

- (C) Team captain
- (S) Suspended
- (I) Ineligible
- (W) Walk-on
- Injured
- Current redshirt

Roster
Last update: 5 Mar 2025

== Schedule ==
Date time, TV	Rank^{#}	Opponent^{#}	Result	Record	Site (attendance) city, state
Non-conference regular season
November 6, 2019*; 1:00 p.m.		Concordia (TX)	W 73–44	1–0	Convocation Center (567); San Antonio, TX
November 11, 2019*; 7:00 p.m.		Incarnate Word	W 66-53	2–0	Convocation Center (482); San Antonio, TX
November 14, 2019*; 7:00 p.m., LHN		at No. 22 Texas	L 53–84	2–1	Frank Erwin Center (2,913); Austin, TX
November 18, 2019*; 1:00 p.m.		University of the Southwest	W 79–62	3–1	Convocation Center (308); San Antonio, TX
November 22, 2019*; 12:00 p.m.		at Hawaii; Bank of Hawaii Classic	L 50-62	3–2	Stan Sheriff Center (1,201); Honolulu, HI
November 24, 2019*; 10:00 p.m.		vs. Utah; Bank of Hawaii Classic	L 45–91	3–3	Stan Sheriff Center; Honolulu, HI
November 30, 2019*; 10:30 p.m.		at UTRGV	L 64-75	3–4	UTRGV Fieldhouse; Edinburg, TX
December 4, 2019*; 7:00 p.m.		at Texas State; I-35 Rivalry	L 69–74 ^{OT}	3–5	Strahan Arena (1,087); San Marcos, TX
December 8, 2019*; 8:00 p.m.		Sam Houston State	L 77–81	3–6	Convocation Center (490); San Antonio, TX
December 20, 2019*; 2:00 p.m.		Texas Wesleyan	W 80–78	4–6	Convocation Center; San Antonio, TX
December 29, 2019*; 12:00 p.m., ESPN+		at Texas Tech	L 58–115	4–7	United Supermarkets Arena (4,172); Lubbock, TX
Conference USA regular season
January 2, 2020; 1:00 p.m., ESPN+		Florida Atlantic	L 53-80	4–8 (0–1)	Convocation Center (237); San Antonio, TX
January 4, 2020; 8:00 p.m.		FIU	W 60-45	5–8 (1–1)	Convocation Center (293); San Antonio, TX
January 9, 2020; 12:30 p.m.		at Louisiana Tech	W 82–73	6–9 (2–1)	Thomas Assembly Center (1,380); Ruston, LA
January 11, 2020; 4:00 p.m.		at Southern Miss	L 65-82	6–10 (2–2)	Reed Green Coliseum (1,013); Hattiesburg, MS
January 18, 2020; 1:00 p.m.		at UTEP	L 54–94	6–11 (2–3)	Don Haskins Center; El Paso, TX
January 23, 2020; 6:00 p.m.		North Texas	L 55–79	6–12 (2–4)	Convocation Center (1,153); San Antonio, TX
January 26, 2020; 8:00 p.m.		Rice	L 62–72	6–13 (2–6)	Convocation Center (389); San Antonio, TX
January 30, 2020; 11:00 a.m.		at UAB	L 55–94	6–14 (2–6)	Bartow Arena (1,751); Birmingham, AL
February 1, 2020; 11:00 a.m.		Middle Tennessee	L 48–69	6–15 (2–7)	(2,843); Murfreesboro, TN
February 6, 2020; 6:00 p.m., ESPN+		Old Dominion	L 43–62	6–16 (2–8)	Convocation Center (483); San Antonio, TX
February 8, 2020; 8:00 p.m.		Charlotte	L 47–67	6–17 (2–9)	Convocation Center (373); San Antonio, TX
February 13, 2019; 6:00 p.m.		at Marshall	L 53–66	6–18 (2–10)	Cam Henderson Center (531); Huntington, WV
February 15, 2019; 8:00 p.m.		Western Kentucky	L 57–85	6–19 (2–11)	Convocation Center (1,857); San Antonio, TX
February 20, 2020; 7:00 p.m., ESPN+		UTEP	L 59–85	6–20 (2–12)	Convocation Center (574); San Antonio, TX
February 22, 2020; 1:00 p.m.		at North Texas	L 66–94	6–21 (2–13)	(1,558); Denton, TX
February 29, 2020; 1:00 p.m., ESPN+		UAB	L 51–57	6–21 (2–14)	Convocation Center (475); San Antonio, TX
March 5, 2020; 7:00 p.m., ESPN+		Louisiana Tech	L 30–69	6–22 (2–15)	Convocation Center (292); San Antonio, TX
March 7, 2020; 1:00 p.m., ESPN+		at FIU	L 63–71	6–23 (2–16)	Ocean Bank Convocation Center (347); Miami, FL
*Non-conference game. ^{#}Rankings from AP Poll. (#) Tournament seedings in parentheses. All times are in Central.
