= 2025–26 Tulsa Golden Hurricane women's basketball team =

American college basketball season

2025–26 Tulsa Golden Hurricane women's basketball
- Conference: American Conference
- Record: 19–12 (11–7 American)
- Head coach: Angie Nelp (5th season)
- Associate head coach: Doug Brotherton
- Assistant coaches: Taylor Reed; Jim McDonnell
- Home arena: Reynolds Center

2025–26 American Conference women's basketball standings
| | Conf. | | | | Overall |
| Team | W | | L | PCT | W | | L | PCT |
|---|---|---|---|---|---|---|---|---|
| Rice | 17 | – | 1 | .944 | 29 | – | 6 | .829 |
| East Carolina | 14 | – | 4 | .778 | 22 | – | 10 | .688 |
| South Florida | 13 | – | 5 | .722 | 20 | – | 12 | .625 |
| Tulsa | 11 | – | 7 | .611 | 19 | – | 12 | .613 |
| North Texas | 11 | – | 7 | .611 | 19 | – | 14 | .576 |
| UTSA † | 9 | – | 9 | .500 | 18 | – | 16 | .529 |
| Temple | 8 | – | 10 | .444 | 15 | – | 17 | .469 |
| Charlotte | 8 | – | 10 | .444 | 14 | – | 18 | .438 |
| Florida Atlantic | 7 | – | 11 | .389 | 14 | – | 18 | .438 |
| Tulane | 6 | – | 12 | .333 | 11 | – | 20 | .355 |
| Wichita State | 5 | – | 13 | .278 | 8 | – | 23 | .258 |
| UAB | 4 | – | 14 | .222 | 11 | – | 19 | .367 |
| Memphis | 4 | – | 14 | .222 | 10 | – | 21 | .323 |
† 2026 American tournament winner

The 2025–26 Tulsa Golden Hurricane women's basketball team represented the University of Tulsa during the 2025–26 NCAA Division I women's basketball season. The Golden Hurricane, led by fifth-year head coach Angie Nelp, played their home games at the Reynolds Center in Tulsa, Oklahoma as members of the American Conference.

== Previous season ==
The Golden Hurricane finished the 2024–25 season 17–14 and 11–7 in AAC play to clinch the No. 5 seed in the AAC tournament. They were upset by No. 12 Charlotte in the second round. Following the loss, they received an invite to the 2025 WNIT, where they were eliminated in the first round by Lindenwood.

== Offseason ==
=== Departures ===
Tulsa Departures
| Name | Num | Pos. | Height | Year | Hometown | Reason for Departure |
|---|---|---|---|---|---|---|
| Cam Mathews | 1 | G | 5'7" | Junior | Keller, TX | Transferred to Tennessee Tech |
| Kristol Ayson | 2 | G | 5'8" | Senior | Tacoma, WA | Transferred to UCF |
| Lexie Foutch | 4 | F | 6'3" | Senior | Fort Gibson, OK | Graduated |
| Delanie Crawford | 5 | G | 5'11" | Senior | Piedmont, OK | Graduated |
| Paige Bradley | 7 | G | 5'10" | RS Junior | Dallas, TX | Transferred to Coastal Carolina |
| Brooklyn Alexander | 13 | G | 6'1" | Freshman | Houston, TX | Transferred to Memphis |
| Tobi Ademuwagun | 20 | G | 5'11" | RS Freshman | Houston, TX | Transferred to Western Kentucky |
| Hadley Periman | 21 | G/F | 6'2" | Junior | Tuttle, OK | Transferred to Clemson |
| Whitney Sullivan | 23 | F | 6'3" | Freshman | Orangeville, IL | Transferred to Kirkwood CC (NJCAA) |
| Elise Hill | 24 | G | 5'7" | Sophomore | Tulsa, OK | Transferred to SMU |
| McKayla Miller | 32 | G | 6'1" | Sophomore | Cimarron, KS | Transferred to Lipscomb |
| Kennedi Alexander | 33 | G | 6'1" | Freshman | Houston, TX | Transferred to Memphis |

=== Incoming transfers ===
Tulsa Incoming Transfers
| Name | Num | Pos. | Height | Year | Hometown | Previous School |
|---|---|---|---|---|---|---|
| RyLee Grays | 2 | F | 6'4" | Junior | Pearland, TX | Virginia |
| Abby Jegede | 4 | G | 5'10" | RS Junior | Toronto, Ontario | Northeastern |
| Teresa Seppala | 7 | G | 6'0" | Senior | Tampere, Finland | Siena |
| Layla-J Cameron | 11 | G | 6'0" | Junior | Gold Coast, Australia | Dodge City CC (NJCAA) |
| Hannah Riddick | 17 | F | 6'1" | RS Senior | Calgary, Alberta | Memphis |
| Shamaryah Duncan | 20 | G | 5'11" | RS Senior | Waco, TX | North Texas |
| Laura Di Stefano | 31 | F | 6'2" | Junior | Rome, Italy | Salt Lake CC (NJCAA) |

=== Recruiting class ===
There was no college recruiting class for the class of 2025.

== Roster ==
2025–26 Tulsa Golden Hurricane women's basketball team
Players
Coaches

| Pos. | # | Name | Height | Year | Previous school | Hometown |
|---|---|---|---|---|---|---|
| G | 1 | Haven Fisher | 6 ft 0 in (1.83 m) | Fr | Prior Lake High School | Prior Lake, MN |
| F | 2 | RyLee Grays | 6 ft 4 in (1.93 m) | Jr | Pearland High School; North Carolina; Virginia | Pearland, TX |
| G | 4 | Abby Jegede | 5 ft 10 in (1.78 m) | RS Jr | King's Christian Collegiate; Villanova; Northeastern | Toronto, Ontario |
| G | 5 | Alisha Peavy | 6 ft 2 in (1.88 m) | Fr | Pieper High School | San Antonio, TX |
| F | 6 | Brynn Eshoo | 6 ft 2 in (1.88 m) | RS Fr | William Fremd High School | Inverness, IL |
| G | 7 | Teresa Seppala | 6 ft 0 in (1.83 m) | Sr | Mäkelänrinteen Lukio; Siena | Tampere, Finland |
| G | 8 | Gina Nikola Pirjak | 5 ft 8 in (1.73 m) | Fr | Dominis Private School | Jezera, Croatia |
| G | 11 | Layla-J Cameron | 6 ft 0 in (1.83 m) | Jr | Hillcrest Christian College; Dodge City CC | Gold Coast, Australia |
| F | 15 | Jade Clack | 6 ft 1 in (1.85 m) | Jr | Austin High School; TCU | Buda, TX |
| F | 17 | Hannah Riddick | 6 ft 1 in (1.85 m) | RS Sr | Cairine Wilson Secondary School; Memphis | Calgary, Alberta |
| G | 20 | Shamaryah Duncan | 5 ft 11 in (1.8 m) | RS Sr | Midway High School; Wichita State; North Texas | Waco, TX |
| G | 21 | Josie Meghee | 5 ft 9 in (1.75 m) | Fr | Shawnee High School | Shawnee, OK |
| G | 22 | Mady Cartwright | 5 ft 10 in (1.78 m) | Jr | Greenwood High School | Greenwood, AR |
| F | 31 | Laura Di Stefano | 6 ft 2 in (1.88 m) | Jr | Liceo Orazio; Salt Lake CC | Rome, Italy |
| G | 33 | Dora Toman | 6 ft 0 in (1.83 m) | Fr | Soproni Széchenyi István Gimnázium | Budapest, Hungary |

Head coach

- Angie Nelp (Colorado State)

Assistant coach(es)

- Doug Brotherton (Central Michigan)
- Taylor Reed (Louisiana Tech)
- Jim McDonnell

Legend

- (C) Team captain
- (S) Suspended
- (I) Ineligible
- (W) Walk-on
- Injured
- Current redshirt

Roster

== Schedule and results ==
| Date time, TV | Rank^{#} | Opponent^{#} | Result | Record | High points | High rebounds | High assists | Site (attendance) city, state |
Non-conference regular season
| November 5, 2025*; 6:30 p.m., ESPN+ | | New Orleans | W 77–60 | 1–0 | 26 – Cartwright | 12 – Peavy | 5 – Toman | Reynolds Center (1,287); Tulsa, OK |
| November 9, 2025*; 6:30 p.m., ESPN+ | | Prairie View A&M | W 79–59 | 2–0 | 29 – Jegede | 14 – Toman | 5 – Toman | Reynolds Center (1,143); Tulsa, OK |
| November 13, 2025*; 6:30 p.m., ESPN+ | | Houston Christian | W 75–67 | 3–0 | 15 – Cartwright | 7 – Toman | 4 – Tied | Reynolds Center (1,143); Tulsa, OK |
| November 17, 2025*; 7:00 p.m., ESPN+ | | at Oral Roberts; Rivalry | W 78–69 ^{OT} | 4–0 | 27 – Riddick | 18 – Riddick | 3 – Riddick | Mabee Center (1,670); Tulsa, OK |
| November 22, 2025*; 2:00 p.m., ESPN+ | | Missouri State | W 73–57 | 5–0 | 16 – Tied | 9 – Toman | 4 – Clack | Reynolds Center (1,283); Tulsa, OK |
| November 28, 2025*; 10:00 a.m., FloCollege | | vs. Kent State; Nassau Championship Goombay Division semifinals | L 69–75 | 5–1 | 28 – Cartwright | 11 – Riddick | 3 – Tied | Baha Mar Convention Center (217); Nassau, The Bahamas |
| November 30, 2025*; 10:00 a.m., ESPN+ | | vs. Houston; Nassau Championship Goombay Division consolation game | L 61–66 | 5–2 | 22 – Riddick | 7 – Riddick | 4 – Tied | Baha Mar Convention Center (227); Nassau, The Bahamas |
| December 4, 2025*; 6:30 p.m., ESPN+ | | Mississippi Valley State | W 101–53 | 6–2 | 22 – Toman | 9 – Toman | 5 – Toman | Reynolds Center (1,313); Tulsa, OK |
| December 7, 2025*; 1:00 p.m., ESPN+ | | at Creighton | L 60–73 | 6–3 | 19 – Cartwright | 10 – Riddick | 3 – Toman | D. J. Sokol Arena (1,003); Omaha, NE |
| December 15, 2025*; 6:30 p.m., ESPN+ | | at Oklahoma State | L 58–90 | 6–4 | 14 – Grays | 6 – Peavy | 5 – Clack | Gallagher-Iba Arena (2,021); Stillwater, OK |
| December 18, 2025*; 11:00 a.m., ESPN+ | | Arkansas–Pine Bluff | W 67–43 | 7–4 | 16 – Clack | 9 – Toman | 3 – Cartwright | Reynolds Center (4,165); Tulsa, OK |
| December 21, 2025*; 1:45 p.m., SEC Network | | at Florida | W 74–67 | 8–4 | 26 – Cartwright | 5 – Toman | 3 – Tied | Exactech Arena (2,871); Gainesville, FL |
American regular season
| December 30, 2025*; 6:30 p.m., ESPN+ | | Wichita State | W 64–58 | 9–4 (1–0) | 18 – Jegede | 11 – Riddick | 5 – Toman | Reynolds Center (1,501); Tulsa, OK |
| January 6, 2026; 6:30 p.m., ESPN+ | | at Tulane | W 76–73 | 10–4 (2–0) | 22 – Riddick | 11 – Riddick | 5 – Toman | Devlin Fieldhouse (614); New Orleans, LA |
| January 9, 2026; 6:30 p.m., ESPN+ | | Temple | W 94–82 | 11–4 (3–0) | 31 – Cartwright | 11 – Riddick | 4 – Tied | Reynolds Center (1,128); Tulsa, OK |
| January 13, 2026; 5:00 p.m., ESPN+ | | at East Carolina | L 48–79 | 11–5 (3–1) | 8 – Tied | 6 – Jegede | 3 – Cartwright | Williams Arena (687); Greenville, NC |
| January 17, 2026; 3:00 p.m., ESPN+ | | at Charlotte | W 64–53 | 12–5 (4–1) | 22 – Clack | 9 – Clack | 3 – Cartwright | Halton Arena (821); Charlotte, NC |
| January 20, 2026; 6:30 p.m., ESPN+ | | Rice | L 66–78 | 12–6 (4–2) | 22 – Riddick | 8 – Jegede | 1 – Tied | Reynolds Center (1,238); Tulsa, OK |
| January 23, 2026; 2:30 p.m., ESPN+ | | at North Texas | W 57–53 | 13–6 (5–2) | 16 – Tied | 10 – Toman | 2 – Tied | The Super Pit (2,420); Denton, TX |
| January 27, 2026; 4:00 p.m., ESPN+ | | Florida Atlantic | W 77–58 | 14–6 (6–2) | 18 – Cartwright | 6 – Riddick | 4 – Clack | Reynolds Center (1,110); Tulsa, OK |
| January 31, 2026; 2:00 p.m., ESPN+ | | Memphis | W 74–69 ^{2OT} | 15–6 (7–2) | 22 – Riddick | 12 – Clack | 2 – Cartwright | Reynolds Center (1,336); Tulsa, OK |
| February 3, 2026; 2:00 p.m., ESPN+ | | at Wichita State | W 75–65 | 16–6 (8–2) | 27 – Riddick | 6 – Tied | 7 – Cartwright | Charles Koch Arena (902); Wichita, KS |
| February 7, 2026; 2:00 p.m., ESPN+ | | UTSA | L 47–66 | 16–7 (8–3) | 11 – Cartwright | 5 – Riddick | 2 – Tied | Reynolds Center (1,364); Tulsa, OK |
| February 11, 2026; 6:00 p.m., ESPN+ | | at South Florida | L 60–72 | 16–8 (8–4) | 18 – Cartwright | 9 – Riddick | 4 – Cartwright | Yuengling Center (2,414); Tampa, FL |
| February 14, 2026; 1:00 p.m., ESPN+ | | at Florida Atlantic | L 55–61 | 16–9 (8–5) | 17 – Riddick | 11 – Tied | 3 – Tied | Eleanor R. Baldwin Arena (808); Boca Raton, FL |
| February 20, 2026; 6:30 p.m., ESPN+ | | UAB | W 59–55 | 17–9 (9–5) | 17 – Riddick | 8 – Riddick | 3 – Toman | Reynolds Center (1,414); Tulsa, OK |
| February 24, 2026; 6:30 p.m., ESPN+ | | Tulane | W 65–46 | 18–9 (10–5) | 16 – Cartwright | 10 – Riddick | 5 – Riddick | Reynolds Center (1,185); Tulsa, OK |
| February 28, 2026; 1:00 p.m., ESPN+ | | at Rice | L 65–105 | 18–10 (10–6) | 17 – Cartwright | 5 – Cameron | 4 – Tied | Tudor Fieldhouse (1,365); Houston, TX |
| March 4, 2026; 6:30 p.m., ESPN+ | | at UTSA | W 53–41 | 19–10 (11–6) | 17 – Riddick | 8 – Peavy | 4 – Cartwright | Convocation Center (1,173); San Antonio, TX |
| March 7, 2026; 2:00 p.m., ESPN+ | | East Carolina | L 61–76 | 19–11 (11–7) | 20 – Clack | 6 – Tied | 5 – Toman | Reynolds Center (1,324); Tulsa, OK |
American tournament
| March 12, 2026; 12:00 pm, ESPN+ | (4) | vs. (5) North Texas; Quarterfinals | L 73–76 | 19–12 | 26 – Riddick | 8 – Riddick | 3 – Cartwright | Legacy Arena; Birmingham, AL |
*Non-conference game. ^{#}Rankings from AP Poll. (#) Tournament seedings in parentheses. All times are in Central.
