= 2019–20 UAB Blazers women's basketball team =

Intercollegiate basketball season

2019–20 UAB Blazers women's basketball
- Conference: Conference USA
- Record: 20–11 (12–6 C-USA)
- Head coach: Randy Norton (7th season)
- Assistant coaches: Taren Martin; Reagan Miller; Dodie Dunson II
- Home arena: Bartow Arena

2019–20 Conference USA women's basketball standings
	Conf.				Overall
Team	W		L	PCT	W		L	PCT
Rice	16	–	2	.889	21	–	8	.724
Old Dominion	14	–	4	.778	24	–	6	.800
Western Kentucky	14	–	4	.778	22	–	7	.759
Middle Tennessee	13	–	5	.722	21	–	9	.700
UAB	12	–	6	.667	20	–	10	.667
Charlotte	11	–	7	.611	20	–	9	.690
UTEP	8	–	10	.444	15	–	14	.517
Southern Miss	7	–	11	.389	15	–	15	.500
Florida Atlantic	7	–	11	.389	13	–	16	.448
Marshall	7	–	11	.389	13	–	17	.433
Louisiana Tech	6	–	12	.333	14	–	15	.483
North Texas	6	–	12	.333	12	–	18	.400
FIU	3	–	15	.167	6	–	23	.207
UTSA	2	–	16	.111	6	–	23	.207
† 2020 C-USA Tournament winner Rankings from AP poll

The 2019–20 UAB Blazers women's basketball team represented the University of Alabama at Birmingham during the 2019–20 NCAA Division I women's basketball season. The Blazers, led by seventh year head coach Randy Norton, played their home games at the Bartow Arena and are members of Conference USA.

== Roster ==
2019–20 UAB Blazers women's basketball team
Players
Coaches

Pos.	#	Name	Height	Year	Previous school	Hometown
G	0	Miyah Barnes	5 ft 5 in (1.65 m)	Sr	Central HS	Memphis, TN
G	1	Margaret Whitley	5 ft 8 in (1.73 m)	So	Geneva HS	Geneva, IL
G	2	Sam Mitchell	—	Fr	Montini Catholic	Downers Grove, IL
G	3	Angela Vendrell	6 ft 2 in (1.88 m)	Sr	CB Claret Benimaclet	Alicante, Spain
G	5	Emily Frasco	5 ft 11 in (1.8 m)	So	Prospect HS	Mount Prospect, IL
F	10	Sara Rosenfeldt	6 ft 0 in (1.83 m)	So	St. Charles East HS	St. Charles, IL
G	12	Trista Magee	6 ft 1 in (1.85 m)	RS Sr	Presbyterian Christian; Alabama	Ellisville, MS
F	13	Katelynn Thomas	6 ft 0 in (1.83 m)	Sr	Shades Valley HS	Birmingham, AL
F	22	Summer Schloss	—	Fr	Ashbrook HS	Gastonia, NC
G	23	Lea Kerstein	5 ft 8 in (1.73 m)	RS Jr	Montini Catholic HS	West Chicago, IL
G	24	Audrey Jordan	5 ft 10 in (1.78 m)	RS Fr	Carl Harrison HS	Kennesaw, GA
F	25	Jasmine Gracie	—	Fr	Madison Academy	Huntsville, AL
G	32	Rachael Childress	5 ft 10 in (1.78 m)	Sr	Lawrence County HS	Moulton, AL
F	34	Imani Johnson	6 ft 0 in (1.83 m)	Sr	Desoto Central HS	Southaven, MS
F	55	Zakyia Weathersby	—	Jr	Collins HS; Jones College	Collins, MS

Head coach

- Randy Norton (Iowa)

Assistant coach(es)

- Taren Martin (Illinois State)
- Reagan Miller (Liberty)
- Dodie Dunson II (Iowa State)

Legend

- (C) Team captain
- (S) Suspended
- (I) Ineligible
- (W) Walk-on
- Injured
- Current redshirt

Roster

== Schedule ==
Date time, TV	Rank^{#}	Opponent^{#}	Result	Record	Site (attendance) city, state
Exhibition
10/29/2019*; 6:00 pm		Miles	W 92–69		Bartow Arena; Birmingham, AL
Non-conference regular season
11/08/2019*; 4:00 pm		South Alabama; Preseason WNIT	W 77–61	1–0	Bartow Arena (415); Birmingham, AL
11/10/2019*; 2:00 pm, FSOK		at Oklahoma; Preseason WNIT	L 75–82	1–1	Lloyd Noble Center (1,575); Norman, OK
11/15/2019*; 4:00 pm		Boise State; Preseason WNIT	L 81–83	1–2	Bartow Arena (265); Birmingham, AL
11/21/2019*; 6:00 pm		Auburn	W 80–75	2–2	Bartow Arena (1,081); Birmingham, AL
11/24/2019*; 2:00 pm		McNeese State	W 97–70	3–2	Bartow Arena (376); Birmingham, AL
11/27/2019*; 6:00 pm		Alabama–Huntsville	W 74–57	4–2	Bartow Arena (433); Birmingham, AL
12/03/2019*; 6:00 pm		Samford	W 76–69	5–2	Bartow Arena (424); Birmingham, AL
12/08/2019*; 2:00 pm		at Memphis	L 52–77	5–3	Elma Roane Fieldhouse (453); Memphis, TN
12/15/2019*; 2:00 pm		at Alcorn State	W 86–65	6–3	Davey Whitney Complex (107); Lorman, MS
12/20/2018*; 1:00 pm		vs. Colorado; Tulane Classic	L 69–77 ^{OT}	6–4	Devlin Fieldhouse (520); New Orleans, LA
12/21/2019*; 1:00 pm		vs. Texas Southern; Tulane Classic	W 84–68	7–4	Devlin Fieldhouse (602); New Orleans, LA
12/30/2019*; 2:00 pm		Tuskegee	W 103–60	8–4	Bartow Arena (253); Birmingham, AL
Conference USA regular season
01/02/2020; 6:00 pm		Charlotte	L 75–83	8–5 (0–1)	Bartow Arena (310); Birmingham, AL
01/04/2020; 2:00 pm		Old Dominion	W 76–65	9–5 (1–1)	Bartow Arena (495); Birmingham, AL
01/09/2020; 11:00 am		at Western Kentucky	L 65–69	9–6 (1–2)	E. A. Diddle Arena (5,122); Bowling Green, KY
01/11/2020; 12:00 pm		at Marshall	L 56–61	9–7 (1–3)	Cam Henderson Center (607); Huntington, WV
01/16/2020; 6:00 pm		FIU	W 71–58	10–7 (2–3)	Bartow Arena (320); Birmingham, AL
01/18/2020; 2:00 pm		Florida Atlantic	W 92–73	11–7 (3–3)	Bartow Arena (582); Birmingham, AL
01/23/2020; 6:00 pm		at Southern Miss	W 74–68	12–7 (4–3)	Reed Green Coliseum (1,631); Hattiesburg, MS
01/25/2020; 2:00 pm		at Louisiana Tech	W 71–51	13–7 (5–3)	Thomas Assembly Center (1,437); Ruston, LA
01/30/2020; 11:00 am		UTSA	W 94–55	14–7 (6–3)	Bartow Arena (1,751); Birmingham, AL
02/01/2020; 2:00 pm		UTEP	W 63–51	15–7 (7–3)	Bartow Arena (558); Birmingham, AL
02/06/2020; 7:00 pm, ESPN3		at Rice	L 53–64	15–8 (7–4)	Tudor Fieldhouse (834); Houston, TX
02/08/2020; 2:00 pm		at North Texas	W 51–50	16–8 (8–4)	The Super Pit (1,327); Denton, TX
02/15/2020; 2:00 pm, ESPN+		Middle Tennessee	L 52–62	16–9 (8–5)	Bartow Arena (606); Birmingham, AL
02/20/2020; 6:30 pm, ESPN3		at Middle Tennessee	W 61–59	17–9 (9–5)	Murphy Center (3,012); Murfreesboro, TN
02/22/2020; 2:00 pm		Rice	L 65–74	17–10 (9–6)	Bartow Arena (510); Birmingham, AL
02/29/2020; 1:00 pm		at UTSA	W 87–51	18–10 (10–6)	Convocation Center (475); San Antonio, TX
03/05/2020; 5:30 pm		at Old Dominion	W 64–61 ^{OT}	19–10 (11–6)	Ted Constant Convocation Center (2,069); Norfolk, VA
03/07/2020; 2:00 pm		Southern Miss	W 90–46	20–10 (12–6)	Bartow Arena (694); Birmingham, AL
Conference USA Women's Tournament
Mar 11, 2020; 11:30 am, ESPN+	(5)	vs. (12) Louisiana Tech; First Round	L 63–66	20–11	The Ford Center at The Star; Frisco, TX
*Non-conference game. ^{#}Rankings from AP Poll. (#) Tournament seedings in parentheses. All times are in Central Time.

== See also ==
- 2019–20 UAB Blazers men's basketball team
