= Shanice (given name) =

Female given name

Shanice is a female given name, derived from the Hebrew Yôchânân, meaning "God is gracious".

== Popularity ==
The name Shanice rose to popularity in the United States in the 1990s, likely spurred on by the rise of the singer Shanice Wilson. In 1992, it was the 162nd most popular name for girls, with 1,859 births.

== Notable people ==
- Shanice (born 1973), American singer-songwriter, actress, and dancer
- Shanice Williams (born 1996), American actress and singer
- Shanice van de Sanden (born 1992), Dutch footballer
- Shanice Stephens, head coach of the University of North Texas women's basketball team
- Shanice Craft (born 1993), German athlete
- Shanice Love (born 1997), Jamaican athlete
- Shanice Parker (born 1998), Australian rugby league footballer
- Shanice Beckford (born 1995), Jamaican netball player
- Shanice Davidson (born 2000), British trampoline gymnast
