= 2025–26 North Texas Mean Green women's basketball team =

American college basketball season

2025–26 North Texas Mean Green women's basketball
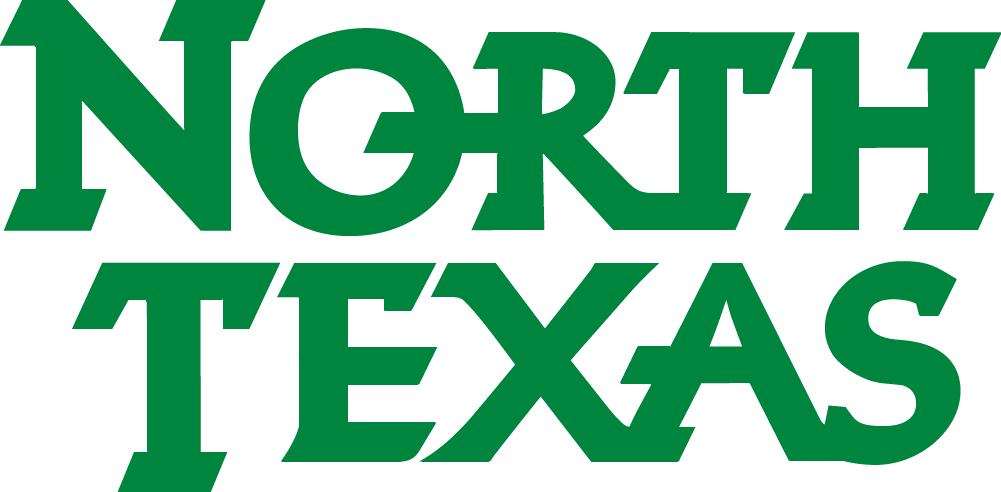
- Conference: American Conference
- Record: 19–14 (11–7 American)
- Head coach: Jason Burton (2nd season)
- Associate head coach: Britney Brown
- Assistant coaches: Durmon Jennings; Princess Davis; Will Watkins
- Home arena: The Super Pit

2025–26 American Conference women's basketball standings
	Conf.				Overall
Team	W		L	PCT	W		L	PCT
Rice	17	–	1	.944	29	–	6	.829
East Carolina	14	–	4	.778	22	–	10	.688
South Florida	13	–	5	.722	20	–	12	.625
Tulsa	11	–	7	.611	19	–	12	.613
North Texas	11	–	7	.611	19	–	14	.576
UTSA †	9	–	9	.500	18	–	16	.529
Temple	8	–	10	.444	15	–	17	.469
Charlotte	8	–	10	.444	14	–	18	.438
Florida Atlantic	7	–	11	.389	14	–	18	.438
Tulane	6	–	12	.333	11	–	20	.355
Wichita State	5	–	13	.278	8	–	23	.258
UAB	4	–	14	.222	11	–	19	.367
Memphis	4	–	14	.222	10	–	21	.323
† 2026 American tournament winner

The 2025–26 North Texas Mean Green women's basketball team represented the University of North Texas during the 2025–26 NCAA Division I women's basketball season. The Mean Green, led by third-year head coach Jason Burton, played their home games at The Super Pit in Denton, Texas as members of the American Conference. They finished the season 19–14, 11–7 in conference play, to finish in a tie for fourth place.

On January 20, 2026, it was announced that senior transfer guard Tiffany Hammond had left the team and was not expected to return.

== Previous season ==
The Mean Green finished the season 25–9 and 15–3 in AAC play to clinch the No. 2 seed in the AAC tournament and earn a double bye. They beat No. 7 East Carolina in the quarterfinals before being eliminated by No. 3 South Florida in the semifinals.

Following the loss, the Mean Green were invited to the 2025 WNIT as an at-large bid. They beat UT Arlington in the first round, and were eliminated following an 86–88 loss to Troy in the Super 16.

== Offseason ==
=== Departures ===
North Texas departures
Name	Num	Pos.	Height	Year	Hometown	Reason for departure
Ereauna Hardaway	2	G	5' 8"	Junior	Jonesboro, AR	Transferred to UTSA
Desiree Wooten	3	G	5' 8"	Sophomore	Dallas, TX	Transferred to Colorado
Jaaucklyn Moore	4	G	5' 8"	Senior	Round Rock, TX	Graduated
Kyla Deck	12	G	5' 9"	Junior	Frisco, TX	Transferred to SMU
Gwendlyn McGrew	14	G	5' 10"	Freshman	Pasadena, TX	Transferred to Incarnate Word
Shamaryah Duncan	20	G	5' 11"	Senior	Waco, TX	Transferred to Tulsa
Amaya Brannon	21	G	5' 11"	Senior	Plano, TX	Graduated
Shadasia Brackens	23	F	5' 11"	Sophomore	Fairfield, TX	Transferred to Tarleton State
Tommisha Lampkin	24	F	6' 2"	Senior	Mansfield, TX	Graduated
Aniyah Johnson	35	F	6' 2"	Senior	Killeen, TX	Graduated

=== Incoming transfers ===
North Texas incoming transfers
Name	Num	Pos.	Height	Year	Hometown	Previous school
Andi Schissler	1	G	5' 10"	Junior	Kersey, CO	Casper (NJCAA)
Jazzy Owens-Barnett	3	G	5' 7"	Senior	Plano, TX	Rice
Mekhia Chase	5	G	5' 7"	Junior	California, MD	Northwest Florida State (NJCAA)
Megan Nestor	10	F	6' 4"	Senior	Canaries, Saint Lucia	Wayland Baptist (NAIA)
Aysia Proctor	12	G	5' 8"	Junior	Schertz, TX	UTSA
Tionna Lidge	21	F	6' 4"	Senior	El Paso, TX	Southern

=== Recruiting class ===
There was no recruiting class for 2025.

== Roster ==
2025–26 North Texas Mean Green women's basketball team
Players
Coaches

Pos.	#	Name	Height	Year	Previous school	Hometown
G	1	Andi Schissler	5 ft 10 in (1.78 m)	Jr	Platte Valley High School; Casper College	Kersey, CO
G	3	Jazzy Owens-Barnett	5 ft 7 in (1.7 m)	Sr	Frisco Liberty High School; Rice	Plano, TX
G	5	Mekhia Chase	5 ft 7 in (1.7 m)	Jr	St. Mary's Ryken High School; Northwest Florida State College	California, MD
F	10	Megan Nestor	6 ft 4 in (1.93 m)	Sr	Soufries Comprehensive Secondary School; Wayland Baptist	Canaries, Saint Lucia
F	11	Laynee Stanley	6 ft 0 in (1.83 m)	Fr	Fort Gibson High School	Teresita, OK
G	12	Aysia Proctor	5 ft 8 in (1.73 m)		Samuel Clemens High School; UTSA	Schertz, TX
F	14	Allison Rickman	6 ft 1 in (1.85 m)	Fr	Canton High School	Canton, TX
G	15	Cherie Spencer	5 ft 8 in (1.73 m)	Fr	Northshore High School	Slidell, LA
F	21	Tionna Lidge	6 ft 4 in (1.93 m)	Sr	Andress High School; Southern	El Paso, TX
F	22	Adhel Tac	6 ft 0 in (1.83 m)	Sr	Sachse High School; TCU / UTEP	Garland, TX
G	30	Chania Price	5 ft 11 in (1.8 m)	So	Brewer High School	Fort Worth, TX
F	32	Shelby Thornton	6 ft 2 in (1.88 m)	Fr	Del City High School	Oklahoma City, OK
F	33	Jaelyn Talley	5 ft 10 in (1.78 m)	Sr	Paul VI Catholic High School; Stetson	Fairfax, VA

Head coach

- Jason Burton (Austin College)

Assistant coach(es)

- Britney Brown (Oklahoma)
- Durmon Jennings (Indianapolis)
- Princess Davis (East Texas A&M)
- Will Watkins (UW–Parkside)

Legend

- (C) Team captain
- (S) Suspended
- (I) Ineligible
- (W) Walk-on
- Injured
- Current redshirt

Roster

== Schedule and results ==
Date time, TV	Rank^{#}	Opponent^{#}	Result	Record	High points	High rebounds	High assists	Site (attendance) city, state
Non-conference regular season
November 3, 2025*; 5:30 p.m., ESPN+		Oklahoma Christian	W 106–36	1–0	22 – Hammond	10 – Nestor	5 – Hammond	The Super Pit (1,311); Denton, TX
November 7, 2025*; 6:00 p.m., ESPN+		Grambling State	W 89–49	2–0	18 – Proctor	15 – Nestor	5 – Schissler	The Super Pit (1,497); Denton, TX
November 13, 2025*; 6:00 p.m., ESPN+		Nelson	W 102–50	3–0	20 – Nestor	10 – Nestor	4 – 2 tied	The Super Pit (1,461); Denton, TX
November 1, 2025*; 2:00 p.m., ESPN+		Abilene Christian	L 51–60	3–1	13 – Proctor	13 – Chase	2 – Spencer	The Super Pit (1,267); Denton, TX
November 22, 2025*; 6:00 p.m., ACCNX		at SMU	W 58–55	4–1	16 – Proctor	15 – Nestor	1 – 6 tied	Moody Coliseum (1,206); Dallas, TX
November 26, 2025*; 1:30 p.m., FloCollege		vs. Saint Mary's; Hoopfest Women's Basketball Challenge	W 67–65 ^{2OT}	5–1	17 – Proctor	7 – Nestor	4 – 2 tied	Comerica Center (223); Frisco, TX
November 27, 2025*; 2:00 p.m., FloCollege		vs. Texas Tech; Hoopfest Women's Basketball Challenge	L 47–67	5–2	14 – Nestor	9 – Nestor	2 – 3 tied	Comerica Center (137); Frisco, TX
December 3, 2025*; 6:00 p.m., ESPN+		No. 24 Oklahoma State	L 55–73	5–3	12 – Schissler	7 – Nestor	3 – Owens-Barnett	The Super Pit (1,819); Denton, TX
December 6, 2025*; 2:00 p.m., ESPN+		Texas Southern	W 81–52	6–3	34 – Nestor	31 – Nestor	5 – Hammond	The Super Pit; Denton, TX
December 14, 2025*; 2:00 p.m., B1G+		at Illinois	L 69–81	6–4	16 – Hammond	7 – Lidge	5 – Schissler	State Farm Center (4,138); Champaign, IL
December 18, 2025*; 6:00 p.m., ESPN+		Oral Roberts	L 73–74	6–5	15 – Nestor	17 – Nestor	5 – Hammond	The Super Pit (1,231); Denton, TX
December 21, 2025*; 2:00 p.m., ESPN+		Santa Clara	L 72–84	6–6	13 – Owens-Barnett	9 – 2 tied	3 – Hammond	The Super Pit (1,206); Denton, TX
American regular season
December 30, 2025; 6:00 p.m., ESPN+		at Florida Atlantic	W 81–56	7–6 (1–0)	22 – Proctor	9 – Nestor	3 – Schissler	Elma Roane Fieldhouse (603); Boca Raton, FL
January 3, 2026; 6:00 p.m., ESPN+		at South Florida	L 61–77	7–7 (1–1)	18 – Proctor	10 – Nestor	2 – 2 tied	Yuengling Center (2,137); Tampa, FL
January 6, 2026; 6:30 p.m., ESPN+		East Carolina	W 87–63	8–7 (2–1)	24 – Proctor	17 – Nestor	4 – Schissler	The Super Pit (1,179); Denton, TX
January 10, 2026; 2:00 p.m., ESPN+		at Tulane	W 59–53	9–7 (3–1)	15 – Price	14 – Nestor	3 – Chase	Devlin Fieldhouse (704); New Orleans, LA
January 13, 2026; 6:30 p.m., ESPN+		Memphis	W 75–64	10–7 (4–1)	17 – Nestor	11 – Nestor	3 – Chase	The Super Pit (1,371); Denton, TX
January 17, 2026; 2:00 p.m., ESPN+		Rice	L 54–58	10–8 (4–2)	25 – Proctor	21 – Nestor	3 – Price	The Super Pit (1,784); Denton, TX
January 20, 2026; 6:00 p.m., ESPN+		at UAB	W 72–59	11–8 (5–2)	16 – Spencer	15 – Nestor	4 – Spencer	Bartow Arena (247); Birmingham, AL
January 23, 2026; 2:30 p.m., ESPN+		Tulsa	L 53–57	11–9 (5–3)	19 – Nestor	27 – Nestor	3 – Chase	The Super Pit (2,420); Denton, TX
January 28, 2026; 3:00 p.m., ESPN+		at UTSA	L 64–66	11–10 (5–4)	20 – Chase	14 – Nestor	6 – Spencer	Convocation Center (639); San Antonio, TX
January 31, 2026; 2:00 p.m., ESPN+		Florida Atlantic	W 67–49	12–10 (6–4)	10 – 4 tied	24 – Nestor	4 – Spencer	The Super Pit (1,365); Denton, TX
February 7, 2026; 1:00 p.m., ESPN+		at Temple	W 69–66	13–10 (7–4)	20 – Nestor	13 – Nestor	5 – Spencer	Liacouras Center (1,243); Philadelphia, PA
February 10, 2026; 8:00 p.m., ESPNU		at Rice	L 68–70	13–11 (7–5)	19 – Proctor	15 – Nestor	4 – Nestor	Tudor Fieldhouse (1,142); Houston, TX
February 14, 2026; 2:00 p.m., ESPN+		Tulane	W 56–47	14–11 (8–5)	21 – Proctor	28 – Nestor	3 – Schissler	The Super Pit (1,555); Denton, TX
February 17, 2026; 6:30 p.m., ESPN+		UAB	W 84–54	15–11 (9–5)	22 – Proctor	14 – Nestor	4 – Chase	The Super Pit (1,737); Denton, TX
February 21, 2026; 4:00 p.m., ESPN+		at Charlotte	W 82–73	16–11 (10–5)	21 – Owens-Barnett	14 – Nestor	4 – Owens-Barnett	Halton Arena (827); Charlotte, NC
February 24, 2026; 6:30 p.m., ESPN+		UTSA	W 87–63	17–11 (11–5)	22 – Schissler	7 – Nestor	4 – 2 tied	The Super Pit (1,810); Denton, TX
February 28, 2026; 2:00 p.m., ESPN+		South Florida	L 63–66	17–12 (11–6)	14 – Nestor	22 – Nestor	3 – Owens-Barnett	The Super Pit (2,007); Denton, TX
March 3, 2026; 6:00 p.m., ESPN+		at Wichita State	L 55–60	17–13 (11–7)	19 – Proctor	19 – Nestor	3 – Owens-Barnett	Charles Koch Arena (885); Wichita, KS
American tournament
March 11, 2026; 12:00 p.m., ESPN+	(5)	vs. (9) Florida Atlantic; Second round	W 80–57	18−13	24 – Proctor	12 – Nestor	4 – Spencer	Legacy Arena (307); Birmingham, AL
March 12, 2026; 12:00 p.m., ESPN+	(5)	vs. (4) Tulsa; Quarterfinals	W 76–73	19–13	18 – Schissler	8 – Price	9 – Owens-Barnett	Legacy Arena; Birmingham, AL
March 13, 2026; 6:00 p.m., ESPN+	(5)	vs. (1) Rice; Semifinals	L 67–71	19–14	16 – Nestor	10 – Nestor	4 – Owens-Barnett	Legacy Arena; Birmingham, AL
*Non-conference game. ^{#}Rankings from AP poll. (#) Tournament seedings in parentheses. All times are in Central.
