= 2019–20 Southern Miss Lady Eagles basketball team =

Intercollegiate basketball season

2019–20 Southern Miss Lady Eagles basketball
- Conference: Conference USA
- Record: 15–15 (7–11 C-USA)
- Head coach: Joye Lee-McNelis (16th season)
- Assistant coaches: Jack Trosper; Patosha Jeffery; Stephanie Stoglin-Reed
- Home arena: Reed Green Coliseum

2019–20 Conference USA women's basketball standings
	Conf.				Overall
Team	W		L	PCT	W		L	PCT
Rice	16	–	2	.889	21	–	8	.724
Old Dominion	14	–	4	.778	24	–	6	.800
Western Kentucky	14	–	4	.778	22	–	7	.759
Middle Tennessee	13	–	5	.722	21	–	9	.700
UAB	12	–	6	.667	20	–	10	.667
Charlotte	11	–	7	.611	20	–	9	.690
UTEP	8	–	10	.444	15	–	14	.517
Southern Miss	7	–	11	.389	15	–	15	.500
Florida Atlantic	7	–	11	.389	13	–	16	.448
Marshall	7	–	11	.389	13	–	17	.433
Louisiana Tech	6	–	12	.333	14	–	15	.483
North Texas	6	–	12	.333	12	–	18	.400
FIU	3	–	15	.167	6	–	23	.207
UTSA	2	–	16	.111	6	–	23	.207
† 2020 C-USA Tournament winner Rankings from AP poll

The 2019–20 Southern Miss Lady Eagles basketball team represented the University of Southern Mississippi during the 2019–20 NCAA Division I women's basketball season. The Lady Eagles, led by sixteenth-year head coach Joye Lee-McNelis, played their home games at Reed Green Coliseum and were members of Conference USA (C-USA).

They finished the season 15–15, 7–11 in C-USA play, to finish in a tie for ninth place. They lost in the first round of the C-USA women's tournament to Marshall. The day following their loss, the rest of the games for the postseason tournament were cancelled due to COVID-19 concerns.

== Schedule ==
Date time, TV	Rank^{#}	Opponent^{#}	Result	Record	Site (attendance) city, state
Exhibition
November 2, 2019*; 4:00 p.m.		Spring Hill College	W 83–66		Reed Green Coliseum; Hattiesburg, MS
Non-conference regular season
November 5, 2019*; 11:00 a.m.		William Carey	W 77–47	1–0	Reed Green Coliseum (2,163); Hattiesburg, MS
November 9, 2019*; 2:00 p.m., SECN+		at No. 10 Mississippi State	L 58–91	1–1	Humphrey Coliseum (7,591); Hattiesburg, MS
November 13, 2019*; 6:00 p.m.		Southeastern Louisiana	W 62–54	2–1	Reed Green Coliseum (711); Hattiesburg, MS
November 16, 2019*; 12:00 p.m., ESPN+		at Louisiana–Monroe	W 57–42	3–1	Fant–Ewing Coliseum (709); Monroe, LA
November 19, 2019*; 6:00 p.m.		Ole Miss	W 59–53	4–1	Reed Green Coliseum (1,843); Hattiesburg, MS
November 29, 2019*; 4:00 p.m.		Mississippi Valley State; Lady Eagle Thanksgiving Classic	W 84–80	5–1	Reed Green Coliseum (1,087); Hattiesburg, MS
November 30, 2019*; 4:00 p.m.		VCU; Lady Eagle Thanksgiving Classic	W 51–39	6–1	Reed Green Coliseum (1,016); Hattiesburg, MS
December 4, 2019*; 5:00 p.m.		Tulane	L 58–62	6–2	Reed Green Coliseum (3,668); Hattiesburg, MS
December 15, 2019*; 2:00 p.m.		South Alabama	W 62–55	7–2	Reed Green Coliseum (1,243); Hattiesburg, MS
December 19, 2019*; 11:00 a.m.		at Houston	L 60–75	7–3	Fertitta Center (6,206); Houston, TX
December 28, 2019*; 4:00 p.m.		Faulkner	W 71–59	8–3	Reed Green Coliseum (1,117); Hattiesburg, MS
C-USA regular season
January 4, 2020; 4:00 p.m.		Louisiana Tech	W 66–60	9–3 (1–0)	Reed Green Coliseum (1,420); Hattiesburg, MS
January 9, 2020; 6:00 p.m.		UTEP	L 72–89	9–4 (1–1)	Reed Green Coliseum (1,000); Hattiesburg, MS
January 11, 2020; 4:00 p.m.		UTSA	W 82–65	10–4 (2–1)	Reed Green Coliseum (1,013); Hattiesburg, MS
January 16, 2020; 7:00 p.m.		at North Texas	W 65–57	11–4 (3–1)	UNT Coliseum (1,281); Denton, TX
January 18, 2020; 2:00 p.m.		at Rice	L 64–75	11–5 (3–2)	Tudor Fieldhouse (820); Houston, TX
January 23, 2020; 6:00 p.m., ESPN+		UAB	L 68–74	11–6 (3–3)	Reed Green Coliseum (1,631); Hattiesburg, MS
January 25, 2020; 4:00 p.m.		Middle Tennessee	L 69–77	11–7 (3–4)	Reed Green Coliseum (1,774); Hattiesburg, MS
January 30, 2020; 5:30 p.m.		at Old Dominion	L 50–67	11–8 (3–5)	Chartway Arena (1,539); Norfolk, VA
February 1, 2020; 3:00 p.m.		at Charlotte	L 59–63	11–9 (3–6)	Dale F. Halton Arena (867); Charlotte, NC
February 6, 2020; 6:00 p.m.		Marshall	L 65–80	11–10 (3–7)	Reed Green Coliseum (1,015); Hattiesburg, MS
February 8, 2020; 4:00 p.m., ESPN+		Western Kentucky	L 65–81	11–11 (3–8)	Reed Green Coliseum (1,402); Hattiesburg, MS
February 13, 2020; 6:00 p.m.		at Florida Atlantic	W 71–67	12–11 (4–8)	FAU Arena; Boca Raton, FL
February 15, 2020; 1:00 p.m.		at FIU	W 58–53	13–11 (5–8)	Ocean Bank Center (258); Miami, FL
February 20, 2020; 6:30 p.m.		at Louisiana Tech	W 63–61	14–11 (6–8)	Thomas Assembly Center (1,749); Ruston, LA
February 22, 2020; 4:00 p.m.		Charlotte	L 55–59	14–12 (6–9)	Reed Green Coliseum (1,226); Hattiesburg, MS
February 29, 2020; 2:00 p.m.		at UTEP	L 72–80	14–13 (6–10)	Don Haskins Center (912); El Paso, TX
March 5, 2020; 6:00 p.m.		Florida Atlantic	W 59–55	15–13 (7–10)	Reed Green Coliseum (1,228); Hattiesburg, MS
March 7, 2020; 2:00 p.m.		at UAB	L 46–90	15–14 (7–11)	Bartow Arena (694); Birmingham, AL
C-USA tournament
March 11, 2020; 11:00 a.m., ESPN+	(9)	vs. (8) Marshall; First round	L 67–71 ^{OT}	15–15	The Ford Center at The Star; Frisco, TX
*Non-conference game. ^{#}Rankings from AP poll. (#) Tournament seedings in parentheses. All times are in Central.

== See also ==
- 2019–20 Southern Miss Golden Eagles basketball team
