= 2019–20 Marshall Thundering Herd women's basketball team =

Intercollegiate basketball season

2019–20 Marshall Thundering Herd women's basketball
- Conference: Conference USA
- Record: 13–17 (7–11 CUSA)
- Head coach: Tony Kemper (3rd season)
- Assistant coaches: Adria Crawford; Lazar Milinkovic
- Home arena: Cam Henderson Center

2019–20 Conference USA women's basketball standings
	Conf.				Overall
Team	W		L	PCT	W		L	PCT
Rice	16	–	2	.889	21	–	8	.724
Old Dominion	14	–	4	.778	24	–	6	.800
Western Kentucky	14	–	4	.778	22	–	7	.759
Middle Tennessee	13	–	5	.722	21	–	9	.700
UAB	12	–	6	.667	20	–	10	.667
Charlotte	11	–	7	.611	20	–	9	.690
UTEP	8	–	10	.444	15	–	14	.517
Southern Miss	7	–	11	.389	15	–	15	.500
Florida Atlantic	7	–	11	.389	13	–	16	.448
Marshall	7	–	11	.389	13	–	17	.433
Louisiana Tech	6	–	12	.333	14	–	15	.483
North Texas	6	–	12	.333	12	–	18	.400
FIU	3	–	15	.167	6	–	23	.207
UTSA	2	–	16	.111	6	–	23	.207
† 2020 C-USA Tournament winner Rankings from AP poll

The 2019–20 Marshall Thundering Herd women's basketball team represented Marshall University during the 2019–20 NCAA Division I women's basketball season. The Thundering Herd, led by third-year head coach Tony Kemper, played their home games at the Cam Henderson Center in Huntington, West Virginia as members of Conference USA (C-USA).

The Thundering Herd finished the regular season 12–17, 7–11 in C-USA play, to finish in a tie for eighth place. After defeating Southern Miss in the first round of the C-USA women's tournament, the rest of the games for the postseason tournament were cancelled due to COVID-19 concerns.

== Schedule ==
Date time, TV	Rank^{#}	Opponent^{#}	Result	Record	Site (attendance) city, state
Non-conference regular season
November 5, 2019*; 6:00 p.m., CUSA.tv		Kentucky Christian	W 89–40	1–0	Cam Henderson Center (733); Huntington, WV
November 9, 2019*; 1:00 p.m., CUSA.tv		Norfolk State	W 75–69	2–0	Cam Henderson Center (817); Huntington, WV
November 13, 2019*; 7:00 p.m., ESPN+		at Ohio	L 51–67	2–1	Convocation Center (552); Athens, OH
November 19, 2019*; 11:00 a.m., CUSA.tv		Coppin State	W 60–47	3–1	Cam Henderson Center (2,363); Huntington, WV
November 21, 2019*; 5:00 p.m., CUSA.tv		Morgan State	L 52–57	3–2	Cam Henderson Center (5,343); Huntington, WV
November 24, 2019*; 2:00 p.m., ESPN+		at Evansville	L 62–66 ^{OT}	3–3	Meeks Family Fieldhouse (317); Evansville, IN
November 27, 2019*; 6:00 p.m., CUSA.tv		Alderson Broaddus	W 85–41	4–3	Cam Henderson Center (447); Huntington, WV
December 3, 2019*; 8:00 p.m., ESPN+		at Indiana State	W 72–60	5–3	Hulman Center (1,232); Terre Haute, IN
December 7, 2019*; 1:00 p.m., CUSA.tv		Bowling Green	L 69–82	5–4	Cam Henderson Center (482); Huntington, WV
December 15, 2019*; 2:00 p.m., BTN+		Rutgers	L 41–66	5–5	Cam Henderson Center (1,337); Huntington, WV
December 21, 2019*; 2:00 p.m., FloHoops		at Towson	L 56–59	5–6	SECU Arena (3,627); Towson, MD
Conference USA regular season
January 2, 2020; 8:00 p.m., CUSA.tv		at Rice	L 43–81	5–7 (0–1)	Tudor Fieldhouse (513); Houston, TX
January 4, 2020; 4:00 p.m., ESPN+		at North Texas	W 68–59	6–7 (1–1)	The Super Pit (1,290); Denton, TX
January 9, 2020; 6:00 p.m., CUSA.tv		Middle Tennessee	L 55–75	6–8 (1–2)	Cam Henderson Center (387); Huntington, WV
January 11, 2020; 1:00 p.m., ESPN+		UAB	W 61–56	7–8 (2–2)	Cam Henderson Center (607); Huntington, WV
January 16, 2020; 7:00 p.m., CUSA.tv		at Charlotte	L 46–52	7–9 (2–3)	Dale F. Halton Arena (718); Charlotte, NC
January 18, 2020; 2:00 p.m., CUSA.tv		at Old Dominion	L 46–57	7–10 (2–4)	Chartway Arena (1,979); Norfolk, VA
January 25, 2020; 1:00 p.m., ESPN+		Western Kentucky	L 65–74	7–11 (2–5)	Cam Henderson Center (872); Huntington, WV
January 30, 2020; 6:00 p.m., CUSA.tv		FIU	L 65–68	7–12 (2–6)	Cam Henderson Center (677); Huntington, WV
February 1, 2020; 1:00 p.m., CUSA.tv		Florida Atlantic	W 85–75	8–12 (3–6)	Cam Henderson Center (569); Huntington, WV
February 6, 2020; 7:00 p.m., CUSA.tv		at Southern Miss	W 80–65	9–12 (4–6)	Reed Green Coliseum (1,015); Hattiesburg, MS
February 8, 2020; 3:00 p.m., ESPN+		at Louisiana Tech	L 50–60	9–13 (4–7)	Thomas Assembly Center (1,503); Ruston, LA
February 13, 2020; 6:00 p.m., CUSA.tv		UTSA	W 66–53	10–13 (5–7)	Cam Henderson Center (531); Huntington, WV
February 15, 2020; 1:00 p.m., CUSA.tv		UTEP	W 76–66	11–13 (6–7)	Cam Henderson Center (612); Huntington, WV
February 20, 2020; 7:00 p.m., ESPN+		at Western Kentucky	L 65–79	11–14 (6–8)	E. A. Diddle Arena (1,056); Bowling Green, KY
February 22, 2020; 3:00 p.m., CUSA.tv		Old Dominion	L 54–64	11–15 (6–9)	Cam Henderson Center (602); Huntington, WV
February 29, 2020; 1:00 p.m., CUSA.tv		North Texas	L 69–77	11–16 (6–10)	Cam Henderson Center (664); Huntington, WV
March 5, 2020; 7:00 p.m., CUSA.tv		at FIU	W 59–57 ^{OT}	12–16 (7–10)	Ocean Bank Center (251); Miami, FL
March 7, 2020; 2:00 p.m., CUSA.tv		at Florida Atlantic	L 50–68	12–17 (7–11)	FAU Arena (437); Boca Raton, FL
C-USA tournament
March 11, 2020; 12:00 p.m., ESPN+	(8)	vs. (9) Southern Miss; First round	W 71–67 ^{OT}	13–17	The Ford Center at The Star; Frisco, TX
March 12, 2020; 12:00 p.m.	(8)	vs. (1) Rice; Quarterfinals	Canceled (Note: Game canceled due to COVID-19 pandemic-related issues)		Ford Center at The Star; Frisco, TX
*Non-conference game. ^{#}Rankings from AP poll. (#) Tournament seedings in parentheses. All times are in Eastern.

== See also ==
- 2019–20 Marshall Thundering Herd men's basketball team
