= 2019–20 Old Dominion Monarchs women's basketball team =

American college basketball season

2019–20 Old Dominion Monarchs women's basketball
- Conference: Conference USA
- Record: 24–6 (14–4 C-USA)
- Head coach: Nikki McCray-Penson (3rd season)
- Assistant coaches: Keith Freeman (2nd season); Scepter Brownlee (2nd season); Brittany Young (3rd season)
- Home arena: Chartway Arena (Note: Ted Constant Convocation Center's interior was renamed Chartway Arena on June 20, 2019.)

2019–20 Conference USA women's basketball standings
	Conf.				Overall
Team	W		L	PCT	W		L	PCT
Rice	16	–	2	.889	21	–	8	.724
Old Dominion	14	–	4	.778	24	–	6	.800
Western Kentucky	14	–	4	.778	22	–	7	.759
Middle Tennessee	13	–	5	.722	21	–	9	.700
UAB	12	–	6	.667	20	–	10	.667
Charlotte	11	–	7	.611	20	–	9	.690
UTEP	8	–	10	.444	15	–	14	.517
Southern Miss	7	–	11	.389	15	–	15	.500
Florida Atlantic	7	–	11	.389	13	–	16	.448
Marshall	7	–	11	.389	13	–	17	.433
Louisiana Tech	6	–	12	.333	14	–	15	.483
North Texas	6	–	12	.333	12	–	18	.400
FIU	3	–	15	.167	6	–	23	.207
UTSA	2	–	16	.111	6	–	23	.207
† 2020 C-USA Tournament winner Rankings from AP poll

The 2019–20 Old Dominion Monarchs women's basketball team represented Old Dominion University during the 2019–20 NCAA Division I women's basketball season. The team was led by third-year head coach Nikki McCray-Penson, and played their home games at Chartway Arena in Norfolk, Virginia as a member of Conference USA (C-USA). The Monarchs finished second overall in their conference but could not compete in the 2020 C-USA women's basketball tournament due to its cancellation as a result of the coronavirus pandemic.

== Roster ==
2019–20 Old Dominion Monarchs women's basketball team
Players
Coaches

Pos.	#	Name	Height	Year	Previous school	Hometown
G	0	Vanessa Blagmon	5 ft 8 in (1.73 m)	RS So	Norcross	Atlanta, GA
G	1	Mariah Adams	6 ft 0 in (1.83 m)	So	eStem	Little Rock, AR
G/F	3	Ajah Wayne	5 ft 10 in (1.78 m)	So	Ramsay	Birmingham, AL
G	4	Aziah Hudson	5 ft 6 in (1.68 m)	So	Baldwin	Baldwin, NY
G	5	Victoria Morris	5 ft 8 in (1.73 m)	Jr	North College Hill	Cincinnati, OH
G	11	Taylor Edwards	5 ft 9 in (1.75 m)	Sr	Woodrow Wilson	Portsmouth, VA
G	12	Amaya Register	5 ft 4 in (1.63 m)	So	Wesleyan	Conyers, GA
F	14	Dejah Carter	6 ft 2 in (1.88 m)	Jr	Cosby	Chesterfield, VA
F	20	Maggie Robinson	6 ft 0 in (1.83 m)	Sr	W. P. Davidson; Shelton State CC	Mobile, AL
F	23	Amari Young	5 ft 11 in (1.8 m)	So	North Augusta	North Augusta, SC
G	24	Mackenzie Smith	5 ft 8 in (1.73 m)	Fr	West Genesee	Syracuse, NY
C	25	Ashley Scott	6 ft 3 in (1.91 m)	Sr	UMS-Wright Preparatory; Shelton State CC	Mobile, AL
F	31	Marie Reichert	6 ft 2 in (1.88 m)	Fr		Kassel, Germany

Head coach

- Nikki McCray-Penson (Tennessee)

Assistant coach(es)

- Keith Freeman (Huntington)
- Scepter Brownlee (San Francisco)
- Brittany Young (Francis Marion)

Legend

- (C) Team captain
- (S) Suspended
- (I) Ineligible
- (W) Walk-on
- Injured
- Current redshirt

Roster
Last update: September 17, 2024

== Schedule and results ==
Date time, TV	Rank^{#}	Opponent^{#}	Result	Record	High points	High rebounds	High assists	Site (attendance) city, state
Non-conference regular season
November 8, 2019*; 6:30 p.m.		Campbell	W 59–44	1–0	16 – tied	8 – tied	2 – Young	Chartway Arena (1,915); Norfolk, VA
November 14, 2019*; 7:00 p.m., SECN+		at Auburn	W 89–77	2–0	35 – Wayne	10 – Wayne	6 – Adams	Auburn Arena (1,635); Auburn, AL
November 20, 2019*; 11:00 a.m.		Winthrop	W 68–44	3–0	16 – Register	13 – Wayne	4 – Edwards	Chartway Arena (5,935); Norfolk, VA
November 24, 2019*; 2:00 p.m., ACCN		at Virginia	L 53–56 ^{OT}	3–1	26 – Morris	8 – Young	2 – tied	John Paul Jones Arena (2,522); Charlottesville, VA
November 29, 2019*; 12:00 p.m.		at Cal Poly; ShareSLO Holiday Beach Classic	W 61–55	4–1	11 – tied	6 – tied	5 – tied	Mott Athletics Center (615); San Luis Obispo, CA
November 30, 2019*; 3:00 p.m.		at Idaho; ShareSLO Holiday Beach Classic	W 67–55	5–1	17 – Young	6 – tied	4 – Adams	Mott Athletics Center (39); San Luis Obispo, CA
December 5, 2019*; 7:00 p.m., FloHoops		at William & Mary; Rivalry	W 69–58	6–1	13 – tied	9 – Young	5 – Adams	Kaplan Arena (684); Williamsburg, VA
December 8, 2019*; 2:00 p.m.		UMES	W 48–39	7–1	12 – Reichert	9 – Young	3 – Adams	Chartway Arena (2,369); Norfolk, VA
December 15, 2019*; 1:00 p.m., ESPN+		at VCU	L 49-62	7-2	10 – tied	10 – Young	2 – Register	Siegel Center (1,018); Richmond, VA
December 19, 2019*; 5:00 p.m.		Richmond; Anne Donovan Classic	W 73–51	8-2	13 – Hudson	8 – tied	5 – Edwards	Chartway Arena (1,795); Norfolk, VA
December 20, 2019*; 5:00 p.m.		Hampton; Anne Donovan Classic	W 75–38	9–2	14 – Young	6 – tied	4 – Adams	Chartway Arena (1,923); Norfolk, VA
December 21, 2019*; 2:00 p.m.		Mount St. Mary's; Anne Donovan Classic	W 85–34	10–2	19 – Morris	8 – Young	7 – Edwards	Chartway Arena (1,885); Norfolk, VA
C-USA regular season
January 2, 2020; 7:30 p.m.		at Middle Tennessee	W 67–56	11–2 (1–0)	16 – Young	10 – Young	2 – tied	Murphy Center (2,782); Murfreesboro, TN
January 4, 2020; 3:00 p.m.		at UAB	L 65–76	11–3 (1–1)	12 – tied	8 – Wayne	3 – Edwards	Bartow Arena (495); Birmingham, AL
January 11, 2020; 2:00 p.m.		Charlotte	W 54–51	12–3 (2–1)	15 – Edwards	10 – Scott	3 – Edwards	Chartway Arena (1,818); Norfolk, VA
January 16, 2020; 6:30 p.m., ESPN+		Western Kentucky	W 76–65	13–3 (3–1)	23 – Wayne	10 – tied	5 – Edwards	Chartway Arena (1,485); Norfolk, VA
January 18, 2020; 2:00 p.m.		Marshall	W 57–46	14–3 (4–1)	19 – Wayne	14 – Young	3 – tied	Chartway Arena (1,979); Norfolk, VA
January 23, 2020; 7:00 p.m., ESPN+		at FIU	W 66–39	15–3 (5–1)	14 – Wayne	9 – Carter	2 – Adams	Ocean Bank Convocation Center (229); Miami, FL
January 25, 2020; 2:00 p.m., ESPN+		at Florida Atlantic	W 75–63	16–3 (6–1)	23 – Edwards	11 – Wayne	4 – Edwards	FAU Arena (493); Boca Raton, FL
January 30, 2020; 6:30 p.m.		Southern Miss	W 67–50	17–3 (7–1)	15 – Hudson	10 – Edwards	8 – Edwards	Chartway Arena (1,539); Norfolk, VA
February 1, 2020; 2:00 p.m.		Louisiana Tech	W 77–61	18–3 (8–1)	21 – Young	16 – Young	8 – Edwards	Chartway Arena (2,396); Norfolk, VA
February 6, 2020; 8:00 p.m., ESPN+		at UTSA	W 62–43	19–3 (9–1)	14 – tied	17 – Young	3 – tied	Convocation Center (UTSA) (483); San Antonio, TX
February 8, 2020; 3:00 p.m.		at UTEP	W 77–69	20–3 (10–1)	23 – tied	11 – Scott	6 – Edwards	Don Haskins Center (1,172); El Paso, TX
February 13, 2020; 6:30 p.m., ESPN+		Rice	W 66–59 ^{OT}	21–3 (11–1)	21 – Wayne	11 – Young	3 – tied	Chartway Arena (2,732); Norfolk, VA
February 15, 2020; 2:00 p.m.		North Texas	W 71–66	22–3 (12–1)	17 – Morris	11 – Wayne	3 – Edwards	Chartway Arena (2,222); Norfolk, VA
February 20, 2020; 7:00 p.m.		at Charlotte	L 59–63	22–4 (12–2)	29 – Edwards	7 – Young	4 – Edwards	Dale F. Halton Arena (732); Charlotte, NC
February 22, 2020; 3:00 p.m.		at Marshall	W 64–54	23–4 (13–2)	18 – Morris	10 – Wayne	4 – Edwards	Cam Henderson Center (602); Huntington, WV
February 26, 2020; 6:30 p.m.		Florida Atlantic	W 60–49	24–4 (14–2)	16 – Morris	9 – Young	6 – Edwards	Chartway Arena (1,949); Norfolk, VA
March 5, 2020; 6:30 p.m.		UAB	L 61–64 ^{OT}	24–5 (14–3)	15 – Wayne	7 – tied	6 – Morris	Chartway Arena (2,069); Norfolk, VA
March 7, 2020; 4:30 p.m.		at Rice	L 70–73	24–6 (14–4)	29 – Morris	8 – Wayne	2 – tied	Tudor Fieldhouse (1,830); Houston, TX
C-USA tournament
March 12, 2020; 2:30 p.m.	(2)	vs. (7) UTEP; Quarterfinals	Canceled (Note: Game was canceled due to COVID-19 pandemic-related issues.)					Ford Center at The Star; Frisco, TX
*Non-conference game. ^{#}Rankings from AP poll. (#) Tournament seedings in parentheses. All times are in Eastern.

== See also ==
- 2019–20 Old Dominion Monarchs men's basketball team
