= 2020 Conference USA women's basketball tournament =

- Classification: Division I
- Season: 2019–20
- Teams: 12
- Site: The Ford Center at The Star; Frisco, Texas
- Television: ESPN+, Stadium, CBSSN

2019–20 Conference USA women's basketball standings
	Conf.				Overall
Team	W		L	PCT	W		L	PCT
Rice	16	–	2	.889	21	–	8	.724
Old Dominion	14	–	4	.778	24	–	6	.800
Western Kentucky	14	–	4	.778	22	–	7	.759
Middle Tennessee	13	–	5	.722	21	–	9	.700
UAB	12	–	6	.667	20	–	10	.667
Charlotte	11	–	7	.611	20	–	9	.690
UTEP	8	–	10	.444	15	–	14	.517
Southern Miss	7	–	11	.389	15	–	15	.500
Florida Atlantic	7	–	11	.389	13	–	16	.448
Marshall	7	–	11	.389	13	–	17	.433
Louisiana Tech	6	–	12	.333	14	–	15	.483
North Texas	6	–	12	.333	12	–	18	.400
FIU	3	–	15	.167	6	–	23	.207
UTSA	2	–	16	.111	6	–	23	.207
† 2020 C-USA Tournament winner As of March 18, 2025; Rankings from AP poll

The 2020 Conference USA women's basketball tournament was to be a postseason women's basketball tournament for Conference USA that was to be held at The Ford Center at The Star in Frisco, Texas, from March 11 through March 14, 2020. In the first round and quarterfinals, two games were to be played simultaneously within the same arena, with the courts separated by a curtain. On March 12, the NCAA announced that the tournament was cancelled due to the coronavirus pandemic.

== Seeds ==
The top twelve teams will qualify for the tournament. Teams will be seeded by record within the conference, with a tiebreaker system to seed teams with identical conference records.

Seed	School	Conference record	Overall record	Tiebreaker
1	Rice^{‡#}	16–2	21–8	
2	Old Dominion^{#}	14–4	24–6	
3	Western Kentucky^{#}	14–4	22–7	
4	Middle Tennessee^{#}	13–5	21–9	
5	UAB	12–6	21–10	
6	Charlotte	11–7	20–9	
7	UTEP	8–10	15–14	
8	Marshall	7–11	12–17	
9	Southern Miss	7–11	15–14	
10	Florida Atlantic	7–11	13–16	
11	North Texas	6–12	12–18	
12	Louisiana Tech	6–12	14–15	
‡ – C–USA regular season champions, and tournament No. 1 seed. # – Received a single-bye in the conference tournament. Overall records include all games played in the regular season.

== Schedule ==
Session	Game	Time*	Matchup^{#}	Score	Television
First round – Wednesday, March 11
1	1	11:00 am	#8 Marshall vs. #9 Southern Miss	71–67	ESPN+
1	2	11:30 am	#5 UAB vs. #12 Louisiana Tech	63–66	ESPN+
2	3	1:30 pm	#7 UTEP vs. #10 Florida Atlantic	95–67	ESPN+
2	4	2:00 pm	#6 Charlotte vs. #11 North Texas	71–67	ESPN+
Quarterfinals – Thursday, March 12
3	5		#1 Rice vs. #8 Marshall	Cancelled	
3	6		#4 MTSU vs. #12 Louisiana Tech	Cancelled	
4	7		#2 Old Dominion vs. #7 UTEP	Cancelled	
4	8		#3 Western Kentucky vs. #6 Charlotte	Cancelled	
Semifinals – Friday, March 13
5	9		Game 5 winner vs. Game 6 winner	Cancelled	
5	10		Game 7 winner vs. Game 8 winner	Cancelled	
Championship – Saturday, March 14
6	11		Game 9 winner vs. Game 10 winner	Cancelled	
*Game times in CT. #-Rankings denote tournament seed

== Bracket ==
First round Wednesday, March 11; ESPN+
8	Marshall	71*
9	Southern Miss	67
5	UAB	63
12	Louisiana Tech	66
7	UTEP	95
10	Florida Atlantic	67
6	Charlotte	71
11	North Texas	67

Quarterfinals; Thursday, March 12; ESPN+/Stadium
1	Rice
8	Marshall
4	MTSU
12	Louisiana Tech
2	Old Dominion
7	UTEP
3	Western Kentucky
6	Charlotte

Semifinals; Friday, March 13; Stadium

Championship Game; Saturday, March 14; CBSSN

All times listed are Central. * denotes overtime.

== See also ==
2020 Conference USA men's basketball tournament
