= 2025–26 Wichita State Shockers women's basketball team =

American college basketball season

2025–26 Wichita State Shockers women's basketball
- Conference: American Conference
- Record: 8–23 (5–13 American)
- Head coach: Terry Nooner (3rd season)
- Assistant coaches: Antwain Scales; Brooke Costley; Patrick Harrison; Uyen Tran; Mandy Willems
- Home arena: Charles Koch Arena

2025–26 American Conference women's basketball standings
	Conf.				Overall
Team	W		L	PCT	W		L	PCT
Rice	17	–	1	.944	29	–	6	.829
East Carolina	14	–	4	.778	22	–	10	.688
South Florida	13	–	5	.722	20	–	12	.625
Tulsa	11	–	7	.611	19	–	12	.613
North Texas	11	–	7	.611	19	–	14	.576
UTSA †	9	–	9	.500	18	–	16	.529
Temple	8	–	10	.444	15	–	17	.469
Charlotte	8	–	10	.444	14	–	18	.438
Florida Atlantic	7	–	11	.389	14	–	18	.438
Tulane	6	–	12	.333	11	–	20	.355
Wichita State	5	–	13	.278	8	–	23	.258
UAB	4	–	14	.222	11	–	19	.367
Memphis	4	–	14	.222	10	–	21	.323
† 2026 American tournament winner

The 2025–26 Wichita State Shockers women's basketball team represented Wichita State University during the 2025–26 NCAA Division I women's basketball season. The Shockers, led by third-year head coach Terry Nooner, played their home games at Charles Koch Arena in Wichita, Kansas, as members of the American Conference.

== Previous season ==
The Shockers finished the 2024–25 season 10–22 and 4–14 in AAC play to clinch the No. 11 seed in the AAC tournament. They were eliminated by No. 6 Tulane in the second round.

== Offseason ==
=== Departures ===
Wichita State departures
Name	Num	Pos.	Height	Year	Hometown	Reason for departure
Taylor Jameson	0	G	5'5"	Graduate student	Wichita, KS	Graduated
KP Parr	2	G	5'4"	Freshman	Waco, TX	Transferred to Texas State
Princess Anderson	3	G	5'7"	Junior	Beaumont, TX	Transferred to Charlotte
Jayla Murray	4	F	6'0"	RS junior	St. Louis, MO	Transferred to Ole Miss
Ornella Niankan	5	F	6'0"	Senior	Montreal, Quebec	Transferred to Fordham
Jordan Jackson	11	G/F	6'0"	RS sophomore	Sachse, TX	Transferred to Houston Christian
Ella Anciaux	13	C	6'4"	Senior	Wichita, KS	Graduated
Carla Budane	14	F	5'11"	RS junior	Maputo, Mozambique	TBD; not listed on roster (Note: Did not play during the 2024–25 season; was redshirted.)
Aicha Ndour	21	C	6'6"	Senior	Somone, Senegal	Graduated, transferred to Georgia
Jasmine Peaks	22	G	5'6"	Junior	Palm Bay, FL	Transferred to Longwood
Salese Blow	25	G	5'10"	Sophomore	Murphy, TX	Transferred to Texas A&M

=== Incoming transfers ===
Wichita State incoming transfers
Name	Num	Pos.	Height	Year	Hometown	Previous school
Azjah Reeves	0	G	5'8"	Junior	Oklahoma City, OK	McNeese
Abby Cater	2	G	5'7"	Graduate student	PG County, MD	Austin Peay
Jaila Harding	4	G	5'8"	Graduate student	Wichita, KS	New Mexico State
Diamond Richardson	5	G	5'7"	Senior	Sacramento, CA	Langston (NAIA)
Bella Belong	8	F	6'2"	Junior	Yaounde, Cameroon	South Plains (NJCAA)
Jaida McDonald	11	F	5'11"	Junior	Dallas, TX	Pensacola State (NJCAA)
Taya Davis	14	G	5'7"	Graduate student	Decatur, IL	Fordham
Treasure Thompson	21	F	6'2"	Graduate student	Joliet, IL	Texas Southern
Karys Washington	25	G	5'10"	Junior	Fort Smith, AR	Coffeyville CC (NJCAA)
Cheyenne Banks	42	C	6'4"	Graduate student	McLoud, OK	Central Arkansas
Sophie Benharouga	77	F	6'2"	Graduate student	Grenoble, France	Seattle

=== Recruiting class ===
There was no recruiting class for the class of 2025.

== Roster ==
2025–26 Wichita State Shockers women's basketball team
Players
Coaches

Pos.	#	Name	Height	Year	Previous school	Hometown
G	0	Azjah Reeves	5 ft 8 in (1.73 m)	Jr	Harding Charter Preparatory; McNeese	Oklahoma City, OK
G	1	Kyleigh Ortiz	5 ft 6 in (1.68 m)	RS Jr	Kansas High School; Coffeyville CC	Kansas, OK
G	2	Abby Cater	5 ft 7 in (1.7 m)	GS	Elizabeth Seton High School; Trinity Valley CC; Austin Peay	PG County, MD
G	4	Jaila Harding	5 ft 8 in (1.73 m)	GS	Wichita Southeast High School; Butler CC; New Mexico State	Wichita, KS
G	5	Diamond Richardson	5 ft 7 in (1.7 m)	GS	Grant Union High School; Pacific; Cal Poly; Langston	Sacramento, CA
G	7	Fiona Diomande	5 ft 11 in (1.8 m)	RS Fr	Gaspard Monge	Chevilly-Larue, France
F	8	Bella Belong	6 ft 2 in (1.88 m)	Jr	South Plains College	Yaounde, Cameroon
F	11	Jaida McDonald	5 ft 11 in (1.8 m)	Jr	Skyline High School; Pensacola State College	Dallas, TX
F	12	Bre'Yon White	5 ft 11 in (1.8 m)	GS	Shadow Creek High School; Oklahoma; TCU	Pearland, TX
G	14	Taya Davis	5 ft 7 in (1.7 m)	GS	MacArthur High School; Odessa College; Garden City CC; Fordham	Decatur, IL
F	21	Treasure Thompson	6 ft 2 in (1.88 m)	GS	Bolingbrook High School; LSU; Eastern Michigan; Texas Southern	Joliet, IL
F	24	Maimouna Sissoko	6 ft 3 in (1.91 m)	Sr	Cloud County CC	Bamako, Mali
G	25	Karys Washington	5 ft 10 in (1.78 m)	Jr	Northside High School; Coffeyville CC	Fort Smith, AR
C	42	Cheyenne Banks	6 ft 4 in (1.93 m)	GS	McLoud High School; Coffeyville CC; Central Arkansas	McLoud, OK
F	77	Sophie Benharouga	6 ft 2 in (1.88 m)	GS	Hartford; Morehead State; Seattle	Grenoble, France

Head coach

- Terry Nooner (Kansas)

Assistant coach(es)

- Antwain Scales (Fort Hays State)
- Brooke Costley (Emporia State)
- Patrick Harrison (Hesston)
- Uyen Tran (Central Methodist)
- Mandy Willems (North Iowa Area CC)

Legend

- (C) Team captain
- (S) Suspended
- (I) Ineligible
- (W) Walk-on
- Injured
- Current redshirt

Roster

== Schedule and results ==
Date time, TV	Rank^{#}	Opponent^{#}	Result	Record	High points	High rebounds	High assists	Site (attendance) city, state
Exhibition
October 29, 2025*; 6:00 p.m.		Newman	W 96–49		–	–	–	Charles Koch Arena; Wichita, KS
Non-conference regular season
November 3, 2025*; 6:00 p.m., ESPN+		Lincoln (MO)	W 96–42	1–0	17 – Harding	7 – Tied	9 – Davis	Charles Koch Arena (689); Wichita, KS
November 6, 2025*; 6:00 p.m., ESPN+		Northwestern State	L 42–55	1–1	15 – Cater	9 – Benharouga	2 – McDonald	Charles Koch Arena (767); Wichita, KS
November 11, 2025*; 6:30 p.m., ESPN+		at Western Kentucky	L 71–73 ^{OT}	1–2	19 – Harding	8 – McDonald	7 – Davis	E.A. Diddle Arena (603); Bowling Green, KY
November 15, 2025*; 3:30 p.m., ESPN+		at Missouri State	L 57–66	1–3	12 – Thompson	8 – White	6 – Davis	T-Mobile Center; Kansas City, MO
November 18, 2025*; 6:00 p.m., ESPN+		Southeast Missouri State	L 62–69	1–4	15 – Cater	9 – McDonald	6 – Cater	Charles Koch Arena (808); Wichita, KS
November 22, 2025*; 2:00 p.m., ESPN+		Cal State Bakersfield	L 55–60	1–5	11 – Cater	7 – Sissoko	2 – Tied	Charles Koch Arena (846); Wichita, KS
November 28, 2025*; 4:00 p.m., ESPN+		vs. UC Irvine; UC Irvine ZotGiving Classic	L 52–58	1–6	21 – Harding	9 – Sissoko	6 – Davis	Bren Events Center (340); Irvine, CA
November 29, 2025*; 4:00 p.m., ESPN+		vs. Idaho; UC Irvine ZotGiving Classic	L 61–83	1–7	12 – Sissoko	7 – Richardson	3 – Tied	Bren Events Center (441); Irvine, CA
December 3, 2025*; 6:00 p.m., ESPN+		at Texas Tech	L 43–83	1–8	11 – Harding	5 – Tied	3 – Davis	United Supermarkets Arena (3,339); Lubbock, TX
December 5, 2025*; 6:00 p.m., ESPN+		Maryland Eastern Shore	L 52–56	1–9	14 – Richardson	5 – McDonald	3 – McDonald	Charles Koch Arena (761); Wichita, KS
December 13, 2025*; 2:30 p.m., ESPN+		Loyola Marymount	W 71–64	2–9	23 – Cater	8 – McDonald	4 – Davis	Charles Koch Arena (725); Wichita, KS
December 16, 2025*; 11:00 a.m., ESPN+		Oral Roberts	W 79–65	3–9	24 – Cater	8 – McDonald	5 – Richardson	Charles Koch Arena (4,118); Wichita, KS
December 20, 2025*; 2:00 p.m., ESPN+		Middle Tennessee	L 45–46	3–10	11 – Harding	8 – Thompson	3 – Tied	Charles Koch Arena; Wichita, KS
American regular season
December 30, 2025; 6:30 p.m., ESPN+		at Tulsa	L 58–64	3–11 (0–1)	22 – Harding	8 – Thompson	3 – Davis	Reynolds Center (1,501); Tulsa, OK
January 3, 2026; 2:00 p.m., ESPN+		Tulane	L 60–70	3–12 (0–2)	18 – Harding	10 – Thompson	3 – Richardson	Charles Koch Arena (831); Wichita, KS
January 6, 2026; 6:00 p.m., ESPN+		Temple	L 50–70	3–13 (0–3)	10 – Richardson	6 – Thompson	2 – Tied	Charles Koch Arena (760); Wichita, KS
January 10, 2026; 2:00 p.m., ESPN+		East Carolina	L 56–83	3–14 (0–4)	12 – Thompson	9 – Thompson	3 – Tied	Charles Koch Arena (872); Wichita, KS
January 13, 2026; 6:00 p.m., ESPN+		at Florida Atlantic	L 64–88	3–15 (0–5)	17 – Cater	5 – Cater	3 – Reeves	Eleanor R. Baldwin Arena (445); Boca Raton, FL
January 17, 2026; 6:00 p.m., ESPN+		at South Florida	L 53–75	3–16 (0–6)	8 – Tied	3 – Washington	2 – Reeves	Yuengling Center (2,581); Tampa, FL
January 20, 2026; 6:00 p.m., ESPN+		Memphis	W 66–59	4–16 (1–6)	42 – Cater	7 – Tied	7 – Davis	Charles Koch Arena (894); Wichita, KS
January 27, 2026; 5:00 p.m., ESPN+		at East Carolina	W 63–54	5–16 (2–6)	16 – Sissoko	9 – McDonald	6 – Davis	Williams Arena (674); Greenville, NC
January 31, 2026; 2:00 p.m., ESPN+		UAB	L 65–83	5–17 (2–7)	13 – Cater	7 – Davis	7 – Davis	Charles Koch Arena (1,083); Wichita, KS
February 3, 2026; 6:00 p.m., ESPN+		Tulsa	L 65–75	5–18 (2–8)	24 – Harding	7 – Thompson	11 – Davis	Charles Koch Arena (902); Wichita, KS
February 7, 2026; 3:00 p.m., ESPN+		at Charlotte	L 72–81	5–19 (2–9)	21 – Harding	5 – Tied	6 – Davis	Halton Arena (716); Charlotte, NC
February 10, 2026; 6:00 p.m., ESPN+		Florida Atlantic	L 77–79 ^{OT}	5–20 (2–10)	27 – Cater	8 – Tied	6 – Davis	Charles Koch Arena (747); Wichita, KS
February 13, 2026; 6:00 p.m., ESPN+		at Rice	L 42–80	5–21 (2–11)	11 – Cater	4 – Tied	2 – White	Tudor Fieldhouse (1,088); Houston, TX
February 21, 2026; 1:00 p.m., ESPN+		UTSA; Play4Kay	W 62–61	6–21 (3–11)	19 – Harding	6 – Davis	5 – Davis	Charles Koch Arena (845); Wichita, KS
February 25, 2026; 6:00 p.m., ESPN+		at UAB	W 60–54	7–21 (4–11)	19 – Thompson	10 – Carter	7 – Richardson	Bartow Arena (310); Birmingham, AL
February 28, 2026; 2:00 p.m., ESPN+		at Tulane	L 54–62	7–22 (4–12)	24 – Cater	6 – Tied	3 – Davis	Devlin Fieldhouse (820); New Orleans, LA
March 3, 2026; 6:00 p.m., ESPN+		North Texas	W 60–55	8–22 (5–12)	20 – Cater	10 – Cater	6 – Davis	Charles Koch Arena (885); Wichita, KS
March 7, 2026; 2:00 p.m., ESPN+		at Memphis	L 61–65	8–23 (5–13)	19 – Cater	11 – Cater	3 – Davis	Elma Roane Fieldhouse (704); Memphis, TN
*Non-conference game. ^{#}Rankings from AP Poll. (#) Tournament seedings in parentheses. All times are in Central.
