= Angie Nelp =

American basketball player and coach (born 1980)

Tulsa Golden Hurricane
- Title: Head coach
- League: American Conference

Personal information
- Born: February 23, 1980 (age 46) Eufaula, Oklahoma
- Listed height: 6 ft 0 in (1.83 m)

Career information
- High school: Canadian (Eufaula, Oklahoma)
- College: Colorado State (1998–2002)
- WNBA draft: 2002: undrafted
- Playing career: 2002–2005
- Position: Small forward
- Coaching career: 2005–present

Career history

Playing
- 2002–2003: 08 Stockholm
- 2003–2005: Colorado Chill

Coaching
- 2005–2007: Yorktown HS (IN)
- 2007–2008: Arkansas (graduate assistant)
- 2008–2010: Marquette (assistant DBO)
- 2011–2015: Mercer (assistant)
- 2015–2017: Rice (assistant/recruiting coordinator)
- 2017–2020: Arizona State (assistant)
- 2020–2021: Arizona State (associate HC)
- 2021–present: Tulsa

Career highlights
- As coach: AAC regular season (2024); As player: MWC Defensive Player of the Year; First-team All-MWC (2002)

Angie Nelp (née Gorton; born February 23, 1980) is an American basketball coach and former player who is currently the head women's basketball coach at the University of Tulsa.

== Coaching career ==
Nelp began her coaching career as a head coach at Yorktown High School in Indiana for two seasons before moving on to Arkansas as a graduate assistant. She went on to Marquette to be their assistant director of basketball operations before joining Mercer as an assistant coach. She also had stints as an assistant at Rice and Arizona State.

=== Tulsa ===
Nelp was named the head coach at Tulsa on April 12, 2021.

== Colorado State statistics ==
Legend
GP	Games played	GS	Games started	MPG	Minutes per game
FG%	Field goal percentage	3P%	3-point field goal percentage	FT%	Free throw percentage
RPG	Rebounds per game	APG	Assists per game	SPG	Steals per game
BPG	Blocks per game	PPG	Points per game	**Bold**	Career high

Year	Team	GP	Points	FG%	3P%	FT%	RPG	APG	SPG	BPG	PPG
1998–99	Colorado State	**36**	253	49.0%	26.1%	67.1%	4.4	1.1	1.4	0.4	7.0
1999–2000	Colorado State	33	399	**52.5%**	17.9%	80.6%	5.5	**3.8**	**2.9**	0.3	12.1
2000–01	Colorado State	32	322	43.3%	20.0%	**87.5%**	3.6	3.4	2.2	0.5	10.1
2001–02	Colorado State	30	**423**	52.1%	**32.4%**	85.7%	**5.8**	2.7	1.5	**0.9**	**14.1**
Career		131	1397	49.5%	23.8%	81.6%	4.8	2.7	2.0	0.5	10.7

== Head coaching record ==
Record table
Season	Team	Overall	Conference	Standing	Postseason
**Tulsa Golden Hurricane** (American Conference) (2021–present)
2021–22	Tulsa	17–11	5–8	8th	WNIT Second Round
2022–23	Tulsa	17–13	7–9	T-6th	
2023–24	Tulsa	25–10	13–5	T–1st	WBIT Quarterfinals
2024–25	Tulsa	17–15	11–7	5th	WNIT First Round
2025–26	Tulsa	19–12	11–7	T–4th	
2026–27	Tulsa				
Tulsa:		95–61 (.609)	47–36 (.566)		
Total:		95–61 (.609)			
National champion Postseason invitational champion Conference regular season champion Conference regular season and conference tournament champion Division regular season champion Division regular season and conference tournament champion Conference tournament champion
