= Randy Norton =

American basketball coach

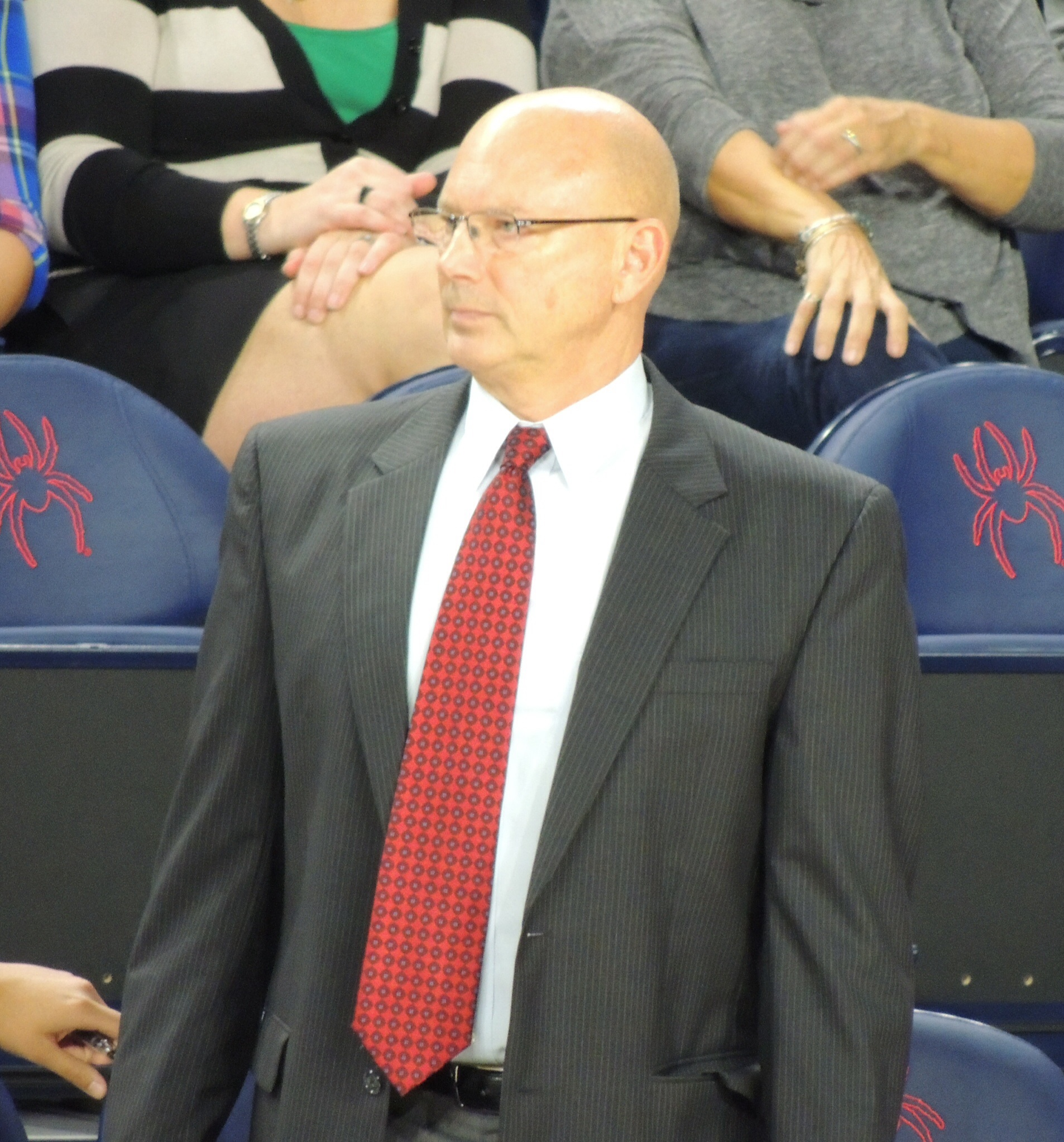

Current position
- Title: Head coach
- Team: UAB
- Conference: American
- Record: 222–178 (.555)

Playing career
- 1978–1980: Iowa

Coaching career (HC unless noted)
- 1989–2003: Assumption HS
- 2003–2010: Illinois State (assistant)
- 2010–2013: Missouri (assistant)
- 2013–present: UAB

Head coaching record
- Overall: 222–178 (.555)

Accomplishments and honors

Championships
- C-USA regular season (2018)

Awards
- C-USA Women’s Basketball Coach of the Year (2018)

Randy Norton is an American college basketball coach, currently women's head coach at the UAB.

== Career ==
Norton played baseball and basketball at the University of Iowa. He was on the coaching staffs at the University of Missouri and Illinois State before becoming head coach of the Blazers prior to the start of the 2013–14 season.

== Head coaching record ==
Record table
| Season | Team | Overall | Conference | Standing | Postseason |
|---|---|---|---|---|---|
UAB (Conference USA) (2013–2023)
| 2013–14 | UAB | 16–15 | 7–9 | 8th | |
| 2014–15 | UAB | 18–13 | 11–7 | T–4th | |
| 2015–16 | UAB | 15–16 | 7–11 | T–8th | |
| 2016–17 | UAB | 15–15 | 8–10 | T–8th | |
| 2017–18 | UAB | 27–7 | 13–3 | 1st | WNIT Second Round |
| 2018–19 | UAB | 26–7 | 12–4 | 2nd | WNIT Second Round |
| 2019–20 | UAB | 20–11 | 12–6 | 5th | |
| 2020–21 | UAB | 10–13 | 3–11 | 6th (West) | |
| 2021–22 | UAB | 16–15 | 8–10 | 5th (West) | |
| 2022–23 | UAB | 14–17 | 5–15 | T–10th | |
UAB (American Athletic Conference) (2023–present)
| 2023–24 | UAB | 18–14 | 9–9 | T–6th | WNIT First Round |
| 2024–25 | UAB | 16–16 | 7–11 | T–8th | WNIT First Round |
| 2025–26 | UAB | 11–19 | 4–14 | T–12th | |
| UAB: | | 222–178 (.555) | 106–118 (.473) | | |
| Total: | | 222–178 (.555) | | | |
National champion Postseason invitational champion Conference regular season champion Conference regular season and conference tournament champion Division regular season champion Division regular season and conference tournament champion Conference tournament champion
