= Tulsa Golden Hurricane women's basketball =

2026–27 Tulsa Golden Hurricane women's basketball team
- University: University of Tulsa
- Head coach: Angie Nelp (6th season)
- Location: Tulsa, Oklahoma
- Arena: Reynolds Center (capacity: 8,355)
- Conference: The American
- Nickname: Golden Hurricane
- Colors: Crimson, royal blue, and old gold

NCAA Division I tournament second round
- 2006

NCAA Division I tournament appearances
- 2006, 2013

Conference tournament champions
- 2006, 2013

Conference regular-season champions
- 2006, 2024

Uniforms
Home	Away

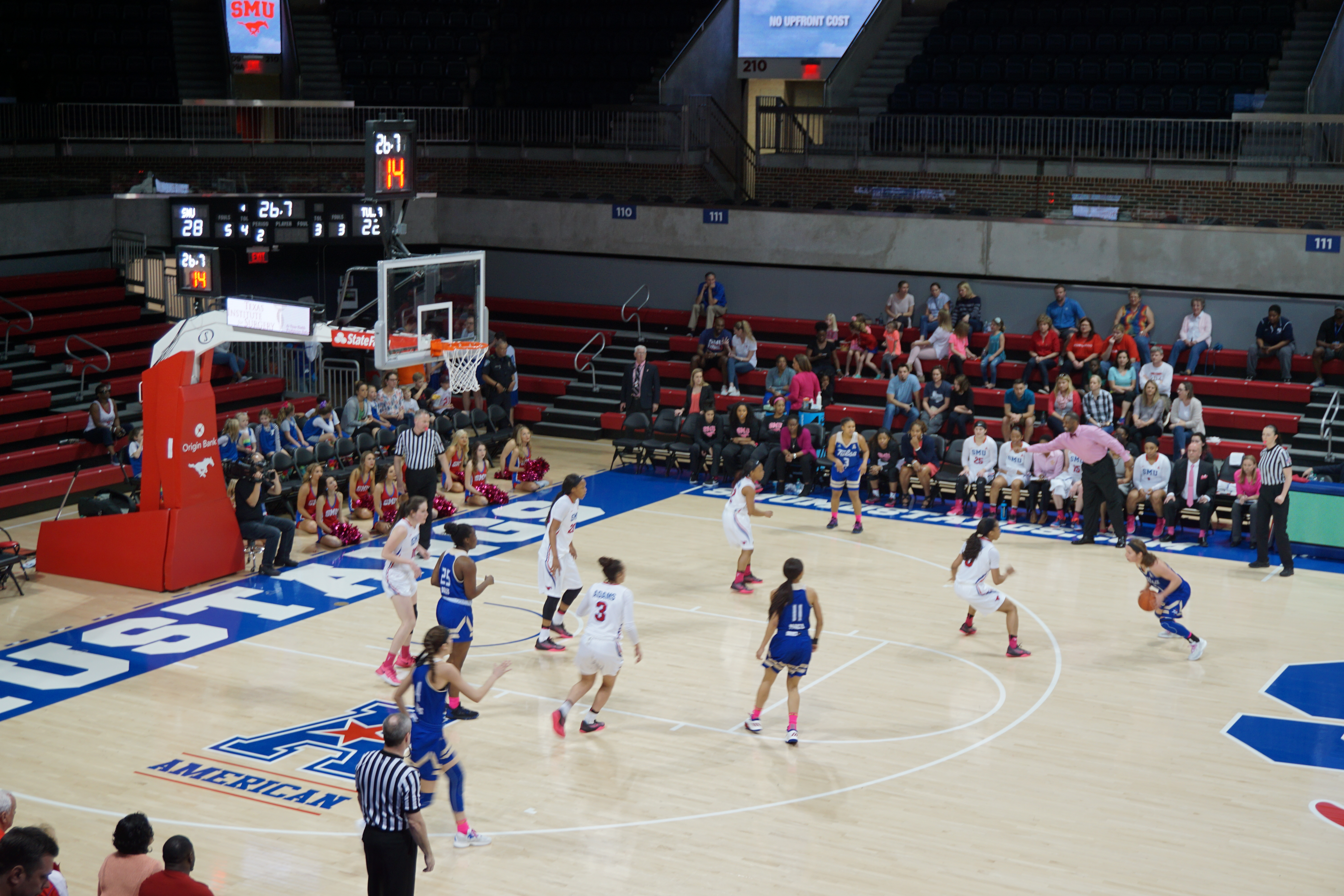
2016–17 Tulsa team playing against SMU at Moody Coliseum

The Tulsa Golden Hurricane women's basketball team represents the University of Tulsa in women's basketball. The school competes in the American Conference in Division I of the National Collegiate Athletic Association (NCAA). The Golden Hurricane play home basketball games at the Reynolds Center in Tulsa, Oklahoma.

== History ==
The Tulsa women's basketball program was discontinued in 1987 and was reinstated in 1996.

As of the 2015–16 season, the Golden Hurricane have a 316–523 record in 31 seasons of play. They have made appearances in the NCAA tournament in 2006 and 2013, with a win in the first round in 2006 before a Second Round loss. They have made four appearances in the WNIT (2004, 2005, 2015 and 2022), with an appearance in the second round in the latter year.

=== Season-by-season record ===
Season	Coach	Record	Conference Record
1976–77	Bob Okresik	2–10	n/a
1977–78	Mike Seifreid	1–19	n/a
1978–79	Mike Seifreid	6–14	n/a
1979–80	Bill Biggs	3–18	n/a
1980–81	Bill Biggs	7–21	n/a
1981–82	Bill Biggs	7–18	n/a
1982–83	Joyce Plagens	8–15	n/a
1983–84	Joyce Plagens	16–11	n/a
1984–85	Katie Fisher	5–21	n/a
1985–86	Mark Schmidt	2–23	n/a
1986–87	Mark Schmidt	3–22	n/a
1996–97	Marla Odom	5–21	1–15 (WAC, 8th in Mountain)
1997–98	Marla Odom	9–18	5–9 (WAC, 5th in Pacific)
1998–99	Marla Odom	7–20	5–9 (WAC, 6th in Mountain)
1999–2000	Kathy McConnell-Miller	14–15	9–5 (WAC, 4th place)
2000–01	Kathy McConnell-Miller	8–21	4–12 (WAC, 7th place)
2001–02	Kathy McConnell-Miller	17–13	11–7 (WAC, 4th place)
2002–03	Kathy McConnell-Miller	14–16	9–9 (WAC, 4th place)
2003–04	Kathy McConnell-Miller	19–12	11–7 (WAC, 3rd place)
2004–05	Kathy McConnell-Miller	19–11	11–7 (WAC, 3rd place)
2005–06	Charlene Thomas-Swinson	26–6	13–3 (C-USA, 1st place)
2006–07	Charlene Thomas-Swinson	11–19	5–11 (C-USA, 9th place)
2007–08	Charlene Thomas-Swinson	11–20	6–10 (C-USA, 11th place)
2008–09	Charlene Thomas-Swinson	7–22	3–13 (C-USA, 11th place)
2009–10	Charlene Thomas-Swinson	12–16	6–10 (C-USA, 11th place)
2010–11	Charlene Thomas-Swinson	5–20	1–15 (C-USA, 12th place)
2011–12	Matilda Mossman	13–15	8–8 (C-USA, 6th place)
2012–13	Matilda Mossman	17–17	8–8 (C-USA, 6th place)
2013–14	Matilda Mossman	12–16	6–10 (C-USA, 10th place)
2014–15	Matilda Mossman	18–14	12–6 (The American, 3rd place)
2015–16	Matilda Mossman	12–19	8–10 (The American, 6th place)
2016–17	Matilda Mossman	10–21	5–11 (The American, 9th place)
2017–18	Matilda Mossman	10–21	3–13 (The American, T-11th place)
2018–19	Matilda Mossman	13–18	6–10 (The American, 7th place)
2019–20	Matilda Mossman	9–21	4–12 (The American, 12th place)
2020–21	Matilda Mossman	5–14	4–13 (The American, 12th place)
2021–22	Angie Nelp	17–10	5–8 (The American, 8th place)
2022–23	Angie Nelp	17–13	7–9 (The American, 7th place)
2023–24	Angie Nelp	23–8	13–5 (The American, T-1st place)

== NCAA tournament results ==
Year	Seed	Round	Opponent	Result
2006	12	First Round; Second Round	(5) NC State (4) DePaul	W 71–61; L 67–71
2013	16	First Round	(1) Stanford	L 56–72

=== NCAA tournament seeding history ===
Years →	'06	'13
Seeds →	12	16
