= Shanice Stephens =

American basketball player and coach

Shanice Stephens was the head women's basketball coach at the University of North Texas. She spent three seasons as the associate head coach at Clemson University, and was an assistant at Rice University the previous 9. She is considered an excellent recruiter, having drawn several top 25 classes while at Clemson. At Rice, she helped the Owls win 179 games.

As of March 17, 2011, Shanice Stephens was released of her duties at the University of North Texas after three seasons with an overall record of 25-67.

She played college basketball at Oklahoma State University. At Oklahoma State, she played on two National Collegiate Athletic Association tournament teams, including one that reached the Sweet Sixteen.
