= North Texas Mean Green women's basketball =

American college basketball team

2026–27 North Texas Mean Green women's basketball team
- University: University of North Texas
- Head coach: Jason Burton (4th season)
- Location: Denton, Texas
- Arena: UNT Coliseum (capacity: 9,797)
- Conference: The American
- Nickname: Mean Green
- Colors: Green and white

NCAA Division I tournament appearances
- 1986

Conference regular-season champions
- 1986, 2024

Conference division champions
- 1999, 2000, 2002, 2006

Uniforms
Home	Away

The North Texas Mean Green women's basketball team represents the University of North Texas (UNT) in NCAA Division I college basketball, competing as a member of the American Conference. Since their 1976 inception, the team has played its home games at the UNT Coliseum.

== Season-by season record ==
Tina Slinker has the most wins as coach of the Mean Green, with 241 (along with 287 losses), in 19 seasons as coach. Of the 10 winning seasons in school history, she had coached six of them. The Mean Green played in the Southland Conference from 1983 to 1996, the Big West Conference from 1996 to 2000, the Sun Belt Conference from 2000 to 2013 before joining Conference USA in 2013.

Season	Coach	Record	Conference Record
1976–77	Cherri Rapp	11–13	n/a
1977–78	Cherri Rapp	16–14	n/a
1978–79	Cherri Rapp	16–15	n/a
1979–80	Denise Smith	4–20	n/a
1980–81	Denise Smith	9–19	n/a
1981–82	Denise Smith	14–14	n/a
1982–83	Denise Smith	6–19	n/a
1983–84	Judy Nelson	2–25	0–12
1984–85	Judy Nelson	4–22	1–11
1985–86	Judy Nelson	20–10	7–3
1986–87	Judy Nelson	15–13	6–6
1987–88	Judy Nelson	14–14	7–7
1988–89	Judy Nelson	11–15	4–10
1989–90	Tina Slinker	16–11	7–7
1990–91	Tina Slinker	6–20	4–10
1991–92	Tina Slinker	8–18	5–13
1992–93	Tina Slinker	9–17	6–12
1993–94	Tina Slinker	10–17	7–11
1994–95	Tina Slinker	10–17	10–8
1995–96	Tina Slinker	11–16	9–9
1996–97	Tina Slinker	5–21	2–12
1997–98	Tina Slinker	10–17	4–10
1998–99	Tina Slinker	20–8	11–3
1999-00	Tina Slinker	17–11	8–6
2000–01	Tina Slinker	19–11	10–6
2001–02	Tina Slinker	21–9	12–3
2002–03	Tina Slinker	12–16	6–9
2003–04	Tina Slinker	11–17	7–8
2004–05	Tina Slinker	14–14	9–6
2005–06	Tina Slinker	19–9	9–6
2006–07	Tina Slinker	9–20	6–12
2007–08	Tina Slinker	14–18	8–10
2008–09	Shanice Stephens	11–20	6–12
2009–10	Shanice Stephens	9–22	5–13
2010–11	Shanice Stephens	5–25	2–14
2011–12	Karen Aston	15–16	7–9
2012–13	Mike Petersen	11–19	10–10
2013–14	Mike Petersen	12–18	6–10
2014–15	Mike Petersen	5–24	4–14
2015–16	Jalie Mitchell	11–19	5–13
2016–17	Jalie Mitchell	12–19	8–10
2017–18	Jalie Mitchell	17–14	6–10
2018–19	Jalie Mitchell	18–16	7–9
2019–20	Jalie Mitchell	12–19	6–12
2020–21	Jalie Mitchell	13–7	10–4
2021–22	Jalie Mitchell	17–13	10–7
2022–23	Jalie Mitchell	11–19	8–12
2023–24	Jason Burton	23–7	13–5 (T–1st)
2024–25	Jason Burton	25–9	15–3 (2nd)
2025-26	Jason Burton	19-14	11-7 (T-5th)

== Postseason results ==
=== NCAA tournament results ===
The Mean Green have appeared in the NCAA tournament once.

Year	Round	Opponent	Result
1986	First Round	Washington	L 54–69

=== WBIT Tournament results ===
The Mean Green have appeared in the Women's Basketball Invitation Tournament once.

Year	Round	Opponent	Result
2024	First Round	#3 TCU	L 67-58

=== WNIT Tournament results ===
The Mean Green have appeared in the Women's National Invitation Tournament four times. Their record is 1–4.

Year	Round	Opponent	Result
2001	First Round	Oklahoma State	L 79–67
2002	First Round	Washington	L 82–61
2022	First Round	Tulsa	L 75–62
2025	Second Round; Super 16	UT Arlington; Troy	W 78–67; L 86–88

=== WBI results ===
The Mean Green have appeared in the Women's Basketball Invitational (WBI) once. Their record is 3–1.

Year	Round	Opponent	Result
2019	First Round; Quarterfinals; Semifinals; Finals	UT-Rio Grande Valley; Utah State; North Alabama; Appalachian State	W 56–42; W 56–54; W 56–53; L 76–59

== Broadcasts ==
North Texas games are broadcast on the radio by the Mean Green Sports Network, part of the Learfield family. While games were previously on 88.1 KNTU, broadcasts are now streamed only on The Varsity Network app. Zac Babb handles play-by-play duties, while Michelle Brooks serves as a color commentator for home games and select road contests.

Television broadcasts are carried by the family of ESPN networks.
