= 2020–21 Chattanooga Mocs women's basketball team =

Intercollegiate basketball season

2020–21 Chattanooga Mocs women's basketball
- Conference: Southern Conference
- Record: 12–8 (7–4 SoCon)
- Head coach: Katie Burrows (3rd season)
- Assistant coaches: Debbie Black; Brittany Jonson; Jon Goldberg
- Home arena: McKenzie Arena

2020–21 Southern Conference women's basketball standings
	Conf.				Overall
Team	W		L	PCT	W		L	PCT
Samford	11	–	2	.846	14	–	11	.560
Mercer†	10	–	3	.769	19	–	7	.731
Chattanooga	9	–	5	.643	14	–	10	.583
Wofford	7	–	7	.500	13	–	11	.542
Furman	6	–	8	.429	11	–	14	.440
UNC Greensboro	6	–	8	.429	8	–	16	.333
Western Carolina	3	–	10	.231	6	–	18	.250
East Tennessee State	1	–	10	.091	4	–	16	.200
† 2021 SoCon Tournament winner As of July 7, 2021; Rankings from AP poll

The 2020–21 Chattanooga Mocs women's basketball team represented the University of Tennessee at Chattanooga during the 2020–21 NCAA Division I women's basketball season. The Mocs, led by first-year head coach Katie Burrows, played their home games at the McKenzie Arena in Chattanooga, Tennessee as members of the Southern Conference (SoCon).

They finished the season 12–18, 7–4 in SoCon play, to finish in third place.

== Previous season ==
The Mocs finished the 2019–20 season 11–18, 10–4 in SoCon play, to finish third in conference standings. They lost to Mercer in the first round of the SoCon tournament.

== Schedule ==
Date time, TV	Rank^{#}	Opponent^{#}	Result	Record	Site (attendance) city, state
Regular season
November 25, 2020*		at Tennessee State	Canceled due to COVID-19 issues		Gentry Complex; Nashville, TN
December 6, 2020*; 2:00 p.m.		UAB	L 58–78	0–1	McKenzie Arena; Chattanooga, TN
December 9, 2020*; 1:00 p.m.		at Troy	L 74–95	0–2	Trojan Arena; Troy, AL
December 11, 2020*; 3:00 p.m.		at Tennessee Tech	W 76–65	1–2	McKenzie Arena; Chattanooga, TN
December 13, 2020*; 2:00 p.m.		at Vanderbilt	L 78–80	1–3	McKenzie Arena; Chattanooga, TN
December 15, 2020*; 5:30 p.m.		at Austin Peay	W 65–64	2–3	Dunn Center; Clarksville, TN
December 18, 2020*; 4:00 p.m., ESPN+		at Eastern Kentucky	L 42–62	2–4	McKenzie Arena; Chattanooga, TN
December 20, 2020*; 3:00 p.m., ESPN+		vs. Georgia Southern; GSU Classic	W 96–87	3–4	Hanner Fieldhouse; Statesboro, GA
December 21, 2020*; 3:00 p.m., ESPN+		vs. Georgia State; GSU Classic	W 73–70	4–4	Hanner Fieldhouse; Statesboro, GA
December 29, 2020*; 2:00 p.m., ESPN+		at North Alabama	W 77–64	5–4	Flowers Hall; Florence, AL
SoCon regular season
January 9, 2021; 7:00 p.m.		East Tennessee State	W 66–51	6–4 (1–0)	McKenzie Arena; Chattanooga, TN
January 15, 2021; 7:00 p.m.		at Furman	W 68–56	7–4 (2–0)	Timmons Arena; Greenville, SC
January 17, 2021; 2:00 p.m.		at Furman	L 46–52	7–5 (2–1)	Timmons Arena; Greenville, SC
January 21, 2021; 7:00 p.m.		Samford	L 60–71	7–6 (2–2)	McKenzie Arena; Chattanooga, TN
January 23, 2021; 5:00 p.m.		Samford	W 70–57	8–6 (3–2)	McKenzie Arena; Chattanooga, TN
January 28, 2021; 7:00 p.m.		at Mercer	L 42–50	8–7 (3–3)	Hawkins Arena; Macon, GA
January 31, 2021; 2:00 p.m.		at Mercer	W 69–60	9–7 (4–3)	Hawkins Arena; Macon, GA
February 4, 2021; 7:00 p.m.		at Wofford	W 60–52	10–7 (5–3)	Jerry Richardson Indoor Stadium; Spartanburg, SC
February 6, 2021; 2:00 p.m.		at Wofford	L 44–67	10–8 (5–4)	Jerry Richardson Indoor Stadium; Spartanburg, SC
February 11, 2021; 7:00 p.m.		Western Carolina	W 74–45	11–8 (6–4)	McKenzie Arena; Chattanooga, TN
February 13, 2021; 2:00 p.m.		Western Carolina	W 72–58	12–8 (7–4)	McKenzie Arena; Chattanooga, TN
February 19, 2021; 7:00 p.m.		UNC Greensboro	W 57–41	13–8 (8–4)	McKenzie Arena; Chattanooga, TN
February 21, 2021; 7:00 p.m.		UNC Greensboro	L 50–58	13–9 (8–5)	McKenzie Arena; Chattanooga, TN
February 25, 2021; 7:00 p.m.		at ETSU	W 65–54	14–9 (8–6)	Freedom Hall Civic Center; Johnson City, TN
*Non-conference game. ^{#}Rankings from AP poll. (#) Tournament seedings in parentheses. All times are in Eastern.
