= Southern Conference women's basketball tournament =

- Conference basketball championship
- Sport: College basketball
- Conference: Southern Conference
- Number of teams: 8
- Format: Single-elimination tournament
- Current stadium: U.S. Cellular Center
- Current location: Asheville, North Carolina
- Played: 1984–present
- Last contest: 2024
- Current champion: Chattanooga (20th title)
- Most championships: Chattanooga (20)
- TV partner: ESPN3 & ESPNU
- Official website: Southern Conference

The Southern Conference women's basketball tournament has been played every year since the 1983–1984 academic year. The winner of the tournament is guaranteed an automatic berth into the NCAA Women's Division I Basketball Championship.

Chattanooga leads the conference in wins, with 20 in 40 tournaments and five consecutively from 2013 until 2017.

== Results ==
Year	Tournament Champion	Score	Tournament Runner-up	Location	Tournament MVP
1984	Chattanooga (1)	60–45	East Tennessee State	Chattanooga, TN	Tina Chairs, Chattanooga
1985	Chattanooga (2)	88–76	Marshall	Johnson City, TN	Chris McClure, Chattanooga
1986	Chattanooga (3)	77–69	Marshall	Boone, NC	Regina Kirk, Chattanooga
1987	Appalachian State (1)	68–65	Marshall	Cullowhee, NC	Valorie Whiteside, Appalachian State
1988	Appalachian State (2)	72–67	Marshall	Huntington, WV	Valorie Whiteside, Appalachian State
1989	Chattanooga (4)	69–65	Furman	Johnson City, TN	Janice Rhynehardt, Furman; Nancy Smith, Chattanooga
1990	Appalachian State (3)	94–90	Furman	Johnson City, TN	Shannon Thomas, Appalachian State
1991	Appalachian State (4)	98–87	East Tennessee State	Johnson City, TN	Nicole Hopson, East Tennessee State
1992	Chattanooga (5)	84–66	Furman	Johnson City, TN	Kim Brown, Chattanooga
1993	Georgia Southern (1)	76–73	Furman	Johnson City, TN	Janice Johnson, Georgia Southern
1994	Georgia Southern (2)	59–55	Furman	Greenville, SC	Rushia Brown, Furman
1995	Furman (1)	88–85		Asheville, NC	DeShawne Blocker, East Tennessee State
1996	Appalachian State (5)	77–75	Marshall	Greensboro, NC	Stephanie Wine, Marshall
1997	Marshall (1)	77–69	Georgia Southern	Greensboro, NC	Keri Simmons, Marshall
1998	UNC Greensboro (1)	75–69	Georgia Southern	Greensboro, NC	Telly Hall, Georgia Southern
1999	Appalachian State (6)	78–69	Davidson	Greensboro, NC	Beth Schoolfield, Appalachian State
2000	Furman (2)	68–49	UNC Greensboro	Greenville, SC	Brianne Dodgen, UNCG
2001	Chattanooga (6)	64–63	UNC Greensboro	Greenville, SC	ChoRhonda Gwaltney, UNCG
2002	Chattanooga (7)	77–69	UNC Greensboro	Charleston, SC	Miranda Warfield, Chattanooga
2003	Chattanooga (8)	66–52	Georgia Southern	Charleston, SC	Miranda Warfield, Chattanooga
2004	Chattanooga (9)	86–68	Western Carolina	Charleston, SC	Katasha Brown, Chattanooga
2005	Western Carolina (1)	97–95 (2OT)	Georgia Southern	Chattanooga, TN	Jennifer Gardner, Western Carolina
2006	Chattanooga (10)	91–79	UNC Greensboro	North Charleston, SC	Tiffani Roberson, Chattanooga
2007	Chattanooga (11)	84–66	Western Carolina	North Charleston, SC	Alex Anderson, Chattanooga
2008	Chattanooga (12)	71–59	Western Carolina	North Charleston, SC	Alex Anderson, Chattanooga
2009	Western Carolina (2)	101–87 (3OT)	College of Charleston	Chattanooga, TN	Brooke Johnson, Western Carolina
2010	Chattanooga (13)	72–67	Samford	Charlotte, NC	Shanara Hollinquest, Chattanooga
2011	Samford (1)	57–54	Appalachian State	Chattanooga, TN	Savannah Hill, Samford
2012	Samford (2)	54–43	Appalachian State	Asheville, NC	Shelby Campbell, Samford
2013	Chattanooga (14)	64–63	Davidson	Asheville, NC	Ashlen Dewart, Chattanooga
2014	Chattanooga (15)	71–45	Davidson	Asheville, NC	Taylor Hall, Chattanooga
2015	Chattanooga (16)	61–56 (OT)	East Tennessee State	Asheville, NC	Jasmine Joyner, Chattanooga
2016	Chattanooga (17)	65–57	Mercer	Asheville, NC	Alicia Payne, Chattanooga
2017	Chattanooga (18)	61–59	Mercer	Asheville, NC	Jasmine Joyner, Chattanooga
2018	Mercer (1)	68–53	East Tennessee State	Asheville, NC	Kahlia Lawrence, Mercer
2019	Mercer (2)	66–63	Furman	Asheville, NC	KeKe Calloway, Mercer
2020	Samford (3)	59–54	UNC Greensboro	Asheville, NC	Natalie Armstrong, Samford
2021	Mercer (3)	60–48	Wofford	Asheville, NC	Amoria Neal-Tysor, Mercer
2022	Mercer (4)	73–54	Furman	Asheville, NC	Amoria Neal-Tysor, Mercer
2023	Chattanooga (19)	63–53	Wofford	Asheville, NC	Raven Thompson, Chattanooga
2024	Chattanooga (20)	69–60	UNCG	Asheville, NC	Jada Guinn, Chattanooga
2025	UNC Greensboro (2)	64–57	Chattanooga	Asheville, NC	Khalis Cain, UNC Greensboro
2026	Samford	72-67	Chattanooga	Asheville, NC	Francie Morris, Samford

== Champions ==
School	Championships	Championship Years
Chattanooga	20	1984, 1985, 1986, 1989, 1992, 2001, 2002, 2003, 2004, 2006, 2007, 2008, 2010, 2013, 2014, 2015, 2016, 2017, 2023, 2024
Appalachian State	6	1987, 1988, 1990, 1991, 1996, 1999
Mercer	4	2018, 2019, 2021, 2022
Samford	4	2011, 2012, 2020, 2026
Georgia Southern	2	1993, 1994
Furman	2	1995, 2000
Western Carolina	2	2005, 2009
UNC Greensboro	2	1998, 2025
Marshall	1	1997

- East Tennessee State and Wofford have not yet won a SoCon tournament.
- Charleston (SC), Davidson, and Elon never won the tournament as SoCon members.
- Schools highlighted in pink are former members of the SoCon

== See also ==
- List of Southern Conference men's basketball champions
