= Katie Burrows =

American basketball coach

Biographical details
- Born: October 30, 1982 (age 43); Chattanooga, Tennessee

Playing career
- 2000–2004: Chattanooga

Coaching career (HC unless noted)
- 2004–2005: Girls Preparatory School (TN) (assistant)
- 2005–2007: Tullahoma High School(TN)
- 2007–2010: Ringgold High School (GA)
- 2010–2018: Chattanooga (assistant)
- 2018–2022: Chattanooga

Head coaching record
- Overall: 46–68

Accomplishments and honors

Awards
- First-team All-Southern (2004)

Katie Burrows (née Galloway) is an American college basketball coach. From 2018 to 2022, she was head coach at Chattanooga.

== Playing career ==
Katie started her basketball career at Lookout Valley High School in Tiftonia Tennessee. She received many accolades during her high school career. She was awarded Best of Preps Female Athlete of the Year by the Chattanooga Times Free Press. She was elected 4x first team by Chattanooga Times Free Press, a 3x Regional Player of the Year. She was also elected to the all state team. In back-to-back seasons, she was a finalist for Tennessee Class A Miss Basketball. Katie came to UT-Chattanooga after finishing high school in 2000. She became an integral member of four straight Southern Conference Championship teams. During her playing tenure at UTC, the Mocs posted an overall record of 102–23 with victories over Florida State, Louisville and Alabama.

== Coaching career ==
After graduating from UTC, Burrows became an assistant girls basketball coach at GPS under former UTC player Susan Lance Crownover .In 2005, she took the position as a head coach in Tullahoma, Tennessee for the girls' basketball team at Tullahoma High School. She also taught both physical and health education at Tullahoma High. She spent 8 seasons with Wes Moore and then five seasons with Women's Basketball Hall of Fame head coach Jim Foster as an assistant at Chattanooga. In 2018, Katie Burrows became the 6th head coach in the history of Mocs women's basketball.

== Personal life ==
Katie received her Bachelors of Science in Exercise Science and Health K-12. She later married Nick Burrows They have two daughters, Jordan and Grace.

== Head coaching record ==
=== NCAA D1 ===
Record table
Season	Team	Overall	Conference	Standing	Postseason
Chattanooga Mocs (Southern Conference) (2018–2022)
2018–19	Chattanooga	14–17	8–6	3rd	
2019–20	Chattanooga	11–18	10–4	T-1st	
2020–21	Chattanooga	14–10	9–5	3rd	
2021–22	Chattanooga	7–23	5–9	T–5th	
Chattanooga:		46–68 (.404)	32–24 (.571)		
Total:		46–68 (.404)			
National champion Postseason invitational champion Conference regular season champion Conference regular season and conference tournament champion Division regular season champion Division regular season and conference tournament champion Conference tournament champion
