= 2019–20 UNC Greensboro Spartans women's basketball team =

American college basketball season

2019–20 UNC Greensboro Spartans women's basketball
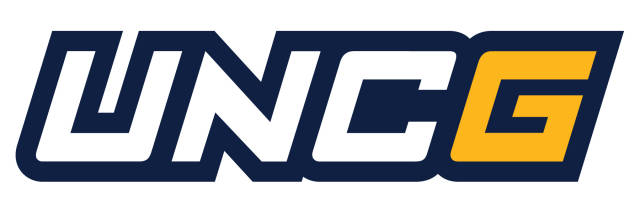

Southern Conference regular-season co-champions
- Conference: Southern Conference
- Record: 21–8 (10–4 SoCon)
- Head coach: Trina Patterson (5th season)
- Assistant coaches: Cait Wetmore; Cetera DeGraffenreid; Ido Singer
- Home arena: Fleming Gymnasium

2019–20 Southern Conference women's basketball standings
	Conf.				Overall
Team	W		L	PCT	W		L	PCT
UNC Greensboro	10	–	4	.714	21	–	8	.724
Samford†	10	–	4	.714	15	–	14	.517
Chattanooga	10	–	4	.714	11	–	17	.393
Furman	8	–	6	.571	12	–	11	.522
Wofford	8	–	6	.571	15	–	14	.517
East Tennessee State	4	–	10	.286	9	–	20	.310
Mercer	4	–	10	.286	7	–	22	.241
Western Carolina	2	–	12	.143	5	–	24	.172
† 2020 SoCon Tournament winner Rankings from AP poll

The 2019–20 UNC Greensboro women's basketball team represented the University of North Carolina at Greensboro during the 2019–20 NCAA Division I women's basketball season. The Spartans, led by fifth-year head coach Trina Patterson, played their home games at Fleming Gymnasium. They were members of the Southern Conference (SoCon).

== Previous season ==
The Spartans finished the 2018–19 season 11–19, 5–9 in SoCon play. They lost in the quarterfinals of the Southern Conference tournament to Chattanooga. Nadine Soliman was named to the All-Southern Conference first team, and Te'ja Twitty was named to the All-Southern Conference second team.

== Roster ==
2019–20 UNC Greensboro Spartans women's basketball team
Players
Coaches

Pos.	#	Name	Height	Year	Hometown
G	0	Jayla Johnson	5 ft 8 in (1.73 m)	Fr	Cocoa, FL
G	1	Tori Powell	5 ft 7 in (1.7 m)	RS Jr	Durham, NC
G	2	Alexus Willey	6 ft 0 in (1.83 m)	Sr	Waldorf, MD
G	3	Alexis Pitchford	5 ft 6 in (1.68 m)	Sr	Orlando, FL
G	4	Jordan Releford	5 ft 5 in (1.65 m)	Fr	Decatur, GA
G	5	Brandi Fier	5 ft 6 in (1.68 m)	Sr	Loves Park, IL
G	10	Rhianna Council	5 ft 11 in (1.8 m)	RS Sr	Durham, NC
G	11	Excellanxt Greer	5 ft 6 in (1.68 m)	Fr	Charlotte, NC
G	12	Cece Crudup	5 ft 8 in (1.73 m)	Jr	Richmond, VA
F	14	Aja Boyd	6 ft 2 in (1.88 m)	RS Jr	Petersburg, VA
G	20	Amber Redmond	5 ft 8 in (1.73 m)	Fr	Asheville, NC
C	22	Lilian Izundu	6 ft 3 in (1.91 m)	RS So	Onitsha, Nigeria
G/F	23	Te'ja Twitty	5 ft 10 in (1.78 m)	Sr	Rutherfordton, NC
G/F	33	Pernilla Sorenson	6 ft 0 in (1.83 m)	Jr	Täby, Sweden
G	35	Nadine Soliman	5 ft 10 in (1.78 m)	Sr	Cairo, Egypt

Head coach

Trina Patterson (Virginia)

Assistant coach(es)

- Cait Wetmore (Adelphi)
- Cetera DeGraffenreid (North Carolina)
- Ido Singer (Capella)

Legend

- (C) Team captain
- (S) Suspended
- (I) Ineligible
- (W) Walk-on
- Injured
- Current redshirt

Roster
Last update: January 6, 2020

== Schedule and results ==
Date time, TV	Rank^{#}	Opponent^{#}	Result	Record	Site (attendance) city, state
Non-conference regular season
November 5, 2019*; 5:30 p.m.		Richmond	L 62–70	0–1	Fleming Gymnasium (221); Greensboro, NC
November 10, 2019*; 5:00 p.m.		at Wake Forest	W 67–65	1–1	LJVM Coliseum (725); Winston-Salem, NC
November 13, 2019*; 6:00 p.m., ESPN+		at Coastal Carolina	L 54–63	1–2	HTC Center (225); Conway, SC
November 17, 2019*; 2:00 p.m.		Maryland Eastern Shore	W 86–48	2–2	Fleming Gymnasium (304); Greensboro, NC
November 21, 2019*; 11:00 a.m., ESPN+		at Liberty	W 58–53	3–2	Vines Center (1,841); Lynchburg, VA
November 26, 2019*; 11:00 a.m., ESPN3		Erskine College	W 106–44	4–2	Fleming Gymnasium (1,370); Greensboro, NC
November 29, 2019*; 6:00 p.m., ESPN+		at UNC Asheville	W 67–40	5–2	Kimmel Arena (1,285); Asheville, NC
December 3, 2019*; 7:00 p.m., ESPN+		at Campbell	L 64–72	5–3	Gore Arena (816); Buies Creek, NC
December 7, 2019*; 4:00 p.m., ESPN+		Georgia State	W 64–49	6–3	Fleming Gymnasium (205); Greensboro, NC
December 12, 2019*; 5:30 p.m.		at North Carolina A&T	L 48–57	6–4	Corbett Sports Center (328); Greensboro, NC
December 16, 2019*; 6:30 p.m.		at College of Charleston	W 69–56	7–4	TD Arena (302); Charleston, SC
December 21, 2019*; 4:00 p.m., ESPN3		High Point	W 82–70	8–4	Fleming Gymnasium (342); Greensboro, NC
December 29, 2019*; 2:00 p.m., ESPN+		Appalachian State	W 54–47	9–4	Fleming Gymnasium (314); Greensboro, NC
January 1, 2020*; 4:00 p.m.		Lenoir–Rhyne	W 84–59	10–4	Fleming Gymnasium (195); Greensboro, NC
January 4, 2020*; 4:00 p.m.		Concord	W 80–45	11–4	Fleming Gymnasium (215); Greensboro, NC
SoCon regular season
January 9, 2020; 7:00 p.m., ESPN+		East Tennessee State	W 63–47	12–4 (1–0)	Fleming Gymnasium (219); Greensboro, NC
January 11, 2020; 4:00 p.m., ESPN3		Chattanooga	W 49–41	13–4 (2–0)	Fleming Gymnasium (217); Greensboro, NC
January 18, 2020; 4:00 p.m.		Western Carolina	W 54–43	14–4 (3–0)	Fleming Gymnasium (404); Greensboro, NC
January 23, 2020; 7:00 p.m., ESPN+		at Furman	W 59–53	15–4 (4–0)	Timmons Arena (411); Greenville, SC
January 25, 2020; 2:00 p.m., ESPN+		at Wofford	L 61–66	15–5 (4–1)	Jerry Richardson Indoor Stadium (1,178); Spartanburg, SC
January 30, 2020; 7:00 p.m., ESPN+		Mercer	W 67–51	16–5 (5–1)	Fleming Gymnasium (475); Greensboro, NC
February 1, 2020; 4:00 p.m., ESPN3		Samford	L 42–56	16–6 (5–2)	Fleming Gymnasium; Greensboro, NC
February 6, 2020; 4:00 p.m., ESPN+		at Chattanooga	L 59–74	16–7 (5–3)	McKenzie Arena (1,383); Chattanooga, TN
February 8, 2020; 2:00 p.m., ESPN3		at East Tennessee State	W 65–45	17–7 (6–3)	Brooks Gymnasium (727); Johnson City, TN
February 15, 2020; 2:00 p.m., ESPN3		at Western Carolina	W 72–61	18–7 (7–3)	Ramsey Center (348); Cullowhee, NC
February 20, 2020; 7:00 p.m., ESPN+		Wofford	W 49–45	19–7 (8–3)	Fleming Gymnasium (463); Greensboro, NC
February 22, 2020; 4:00 p.m., ESPN3		Furman	W 61–53	20–7 (9–3)	Fleming Gymnasium (1,026); Greensboro, NC
February 27, 2020; 7:00 p.m., ESPN+		at Samford	L 57–69	20–8 (9–4)	Pete Hanna Center (398); Homewood, AL
February 29, 2020; 2:00 p.m., ESPN3		at Mercer	W 60–50	21–8 (10–4)	Hawkins Arena (2,197); Macon, GA
SoCon tournament
March 5, 2020; 5:45 p.m., ESPN+	(3)	vs. (6) East Tennessee State; Quarterfinals	W 57–47	22–8	Harrah's Cherokee Center (3,254); Asheville, NC
March 6, 2020; 1:15 p.m., ESPN+	(3)	vs. (7) Mercer; Semifinals	W 75–73 ^{OT}	23–8	Harrah's Cherokee Center (3,612); Asheville, NC
March 8, 2020; 12:00 p.m., ESPN+	(3)	vs. (1) Samford; Final	L 54–59	23–9	Harrah's Cherokee Center; Asheville, NC
*Non-conference game. ^{#}Rankings from AP Poll. (#) Tournament seedings in parentheses.
