= Georgia Southern Eagles basketball =

Georgia Southern Eagles basketball may refer to either of the basketball teams that represent Georgia Southern University:

- Georgia Southern Eagles men's basketball
- Georgia Southern Eagles women's basketball
