= College Park Center =

Multi-purpose arena in Arlington, Texas, U.S.

- CPC

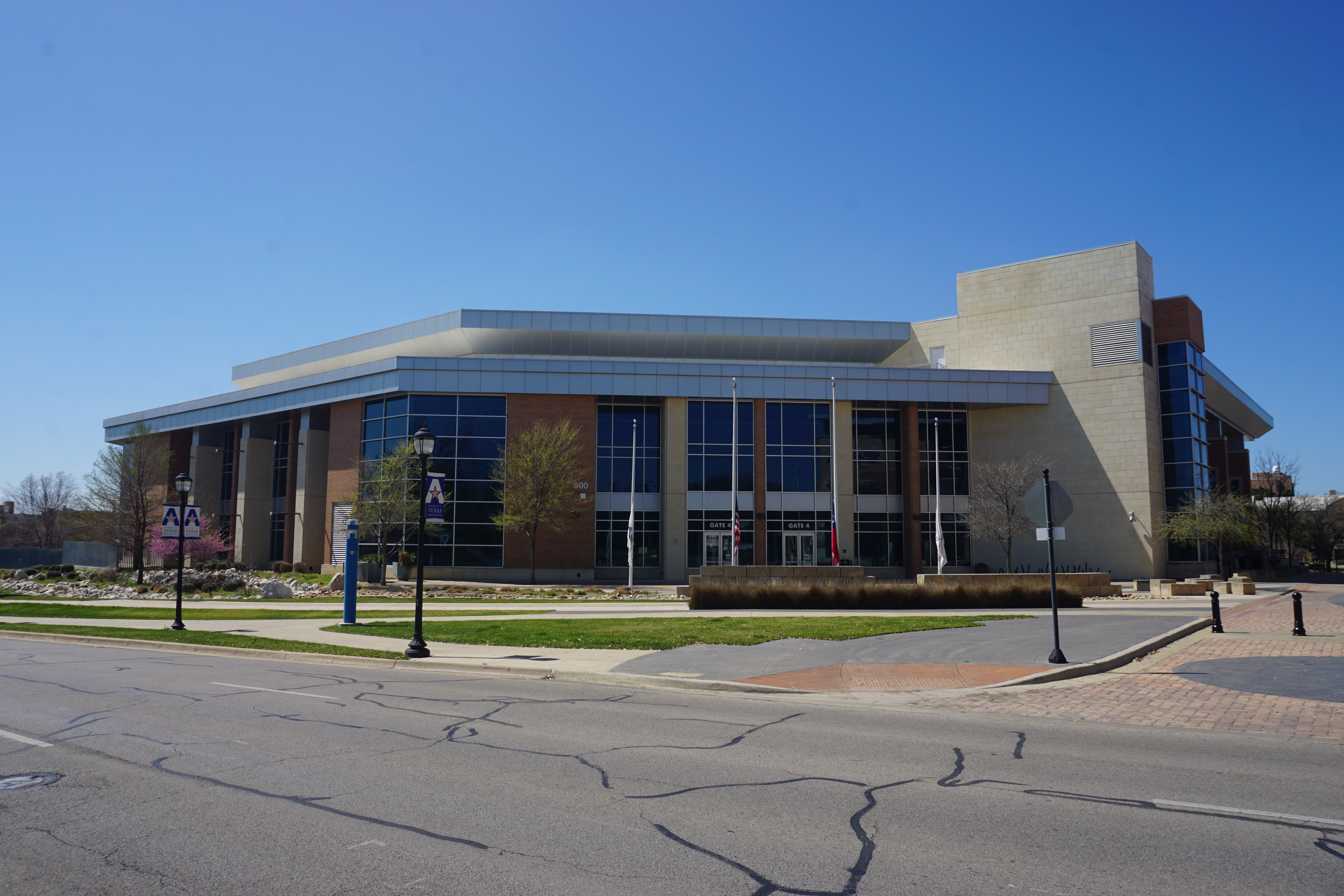

- Location within Texas Location within the United States
- Interactive map of College Park Center
- Address: 600 South Center Street
- Location: Arlington, Texas, U.S.
- Coordinates: 32.730586°N 97.107972°W
- Owner: University of Texas at Arlington
- Operator: University of Texas at Arlington
- Capacity: 7,000
- Surface: Hardwood

Construction
- Groundbreaking: March 5, 2010
- Opened: February 1, 2012
- Cost: $78 million ($109 million in 2025 dollars)
- Architect: HKS, Inc.
- Structural engineer: Rogers Moore/Walter P Moore
- Services engineers: M–E Engineers, Inc.
- General contractor: Hunt Construction Group

Tenants
- UT Arlington Mavericks (NCAA) (2012–present); Dallas Wings (WNBA) (2016–2026)

College Park Center (CPC) is an indoor, multi-purpose arena on the University of Texas at Arlington campus in Arlington, Texas, United States. It seats up to 7,250 spectators for sporting events and up to 6,500 for a concert/stage event.

Its primary tenant is the Mavericks athletic department including the university's basketball and volleyball teams. A secondary tenant during the summer season is the WNBA's Dallas Wings, though they will move to a new downtown Dallas arena for the 2027 season. It also hosts graduation ceremonies for UT Arlington, other private trade schools, and area high schools, along with concerts and events.

The arena is part of a 20-acre (8.1 ha) section of the campus known as the College Park District. Completed in 2012, the District includes a residence hall, student apartments, a welcome center, a credit union, a 4.62-acre (1.87 ha) park called The Green at College Park, restaurants, and three parking garages.

== Features ==
College Park Center is divided into two concourses. The lower surrounds the court/performance area while the upper section is shaped like a horseshoe. For end stage concerts, CPC can seat 6,400 spectators, with the lower bowl seating 3,600. A 2,800-square-foot (260 m^{2}) hospitality suite, divisible into three private sections is above the lower sections opposite the scorers table. The center-hung scoreboard is a four-sided Daktronics 13' × 9' with LED displays while an end-hung scoreboard is an 11' × 19' Daktronics LED display. Two LED display ribbon boards circle the bottom of the balcony seating. At the scorers table are four Daktronics LED display tables linked together to display messages and advertising.

Underneath the lower concourse are state-of-the-art sports medicine and training facilities, two full-sized practice courts, 2,500-square-foot (230 m^{2}) weight room, and an academic support study center.

== History ==
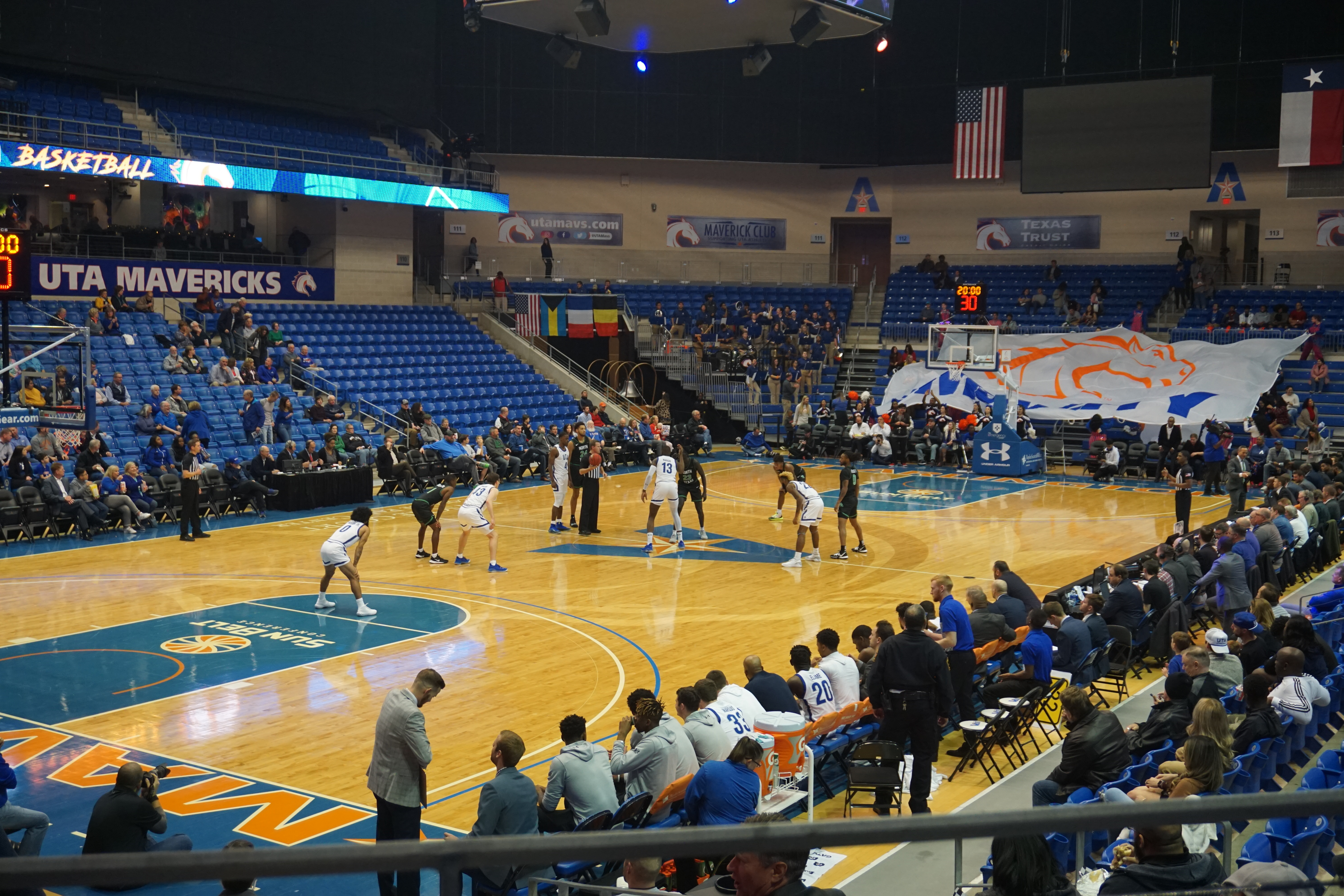
The interior of College Park Center before a UTA Mavericks men's basketball game

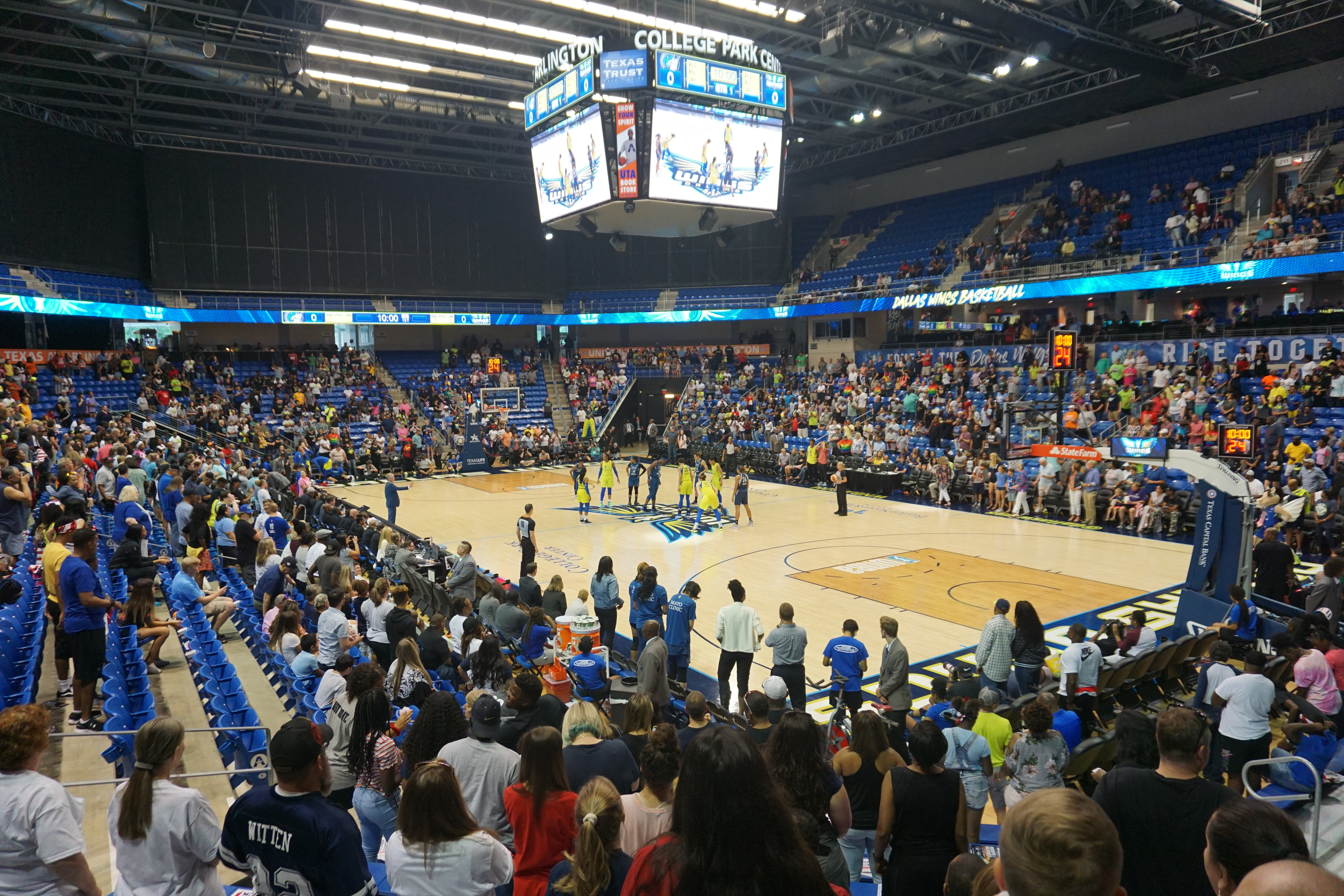
The interior of College Park Center before a Dallas Wings game

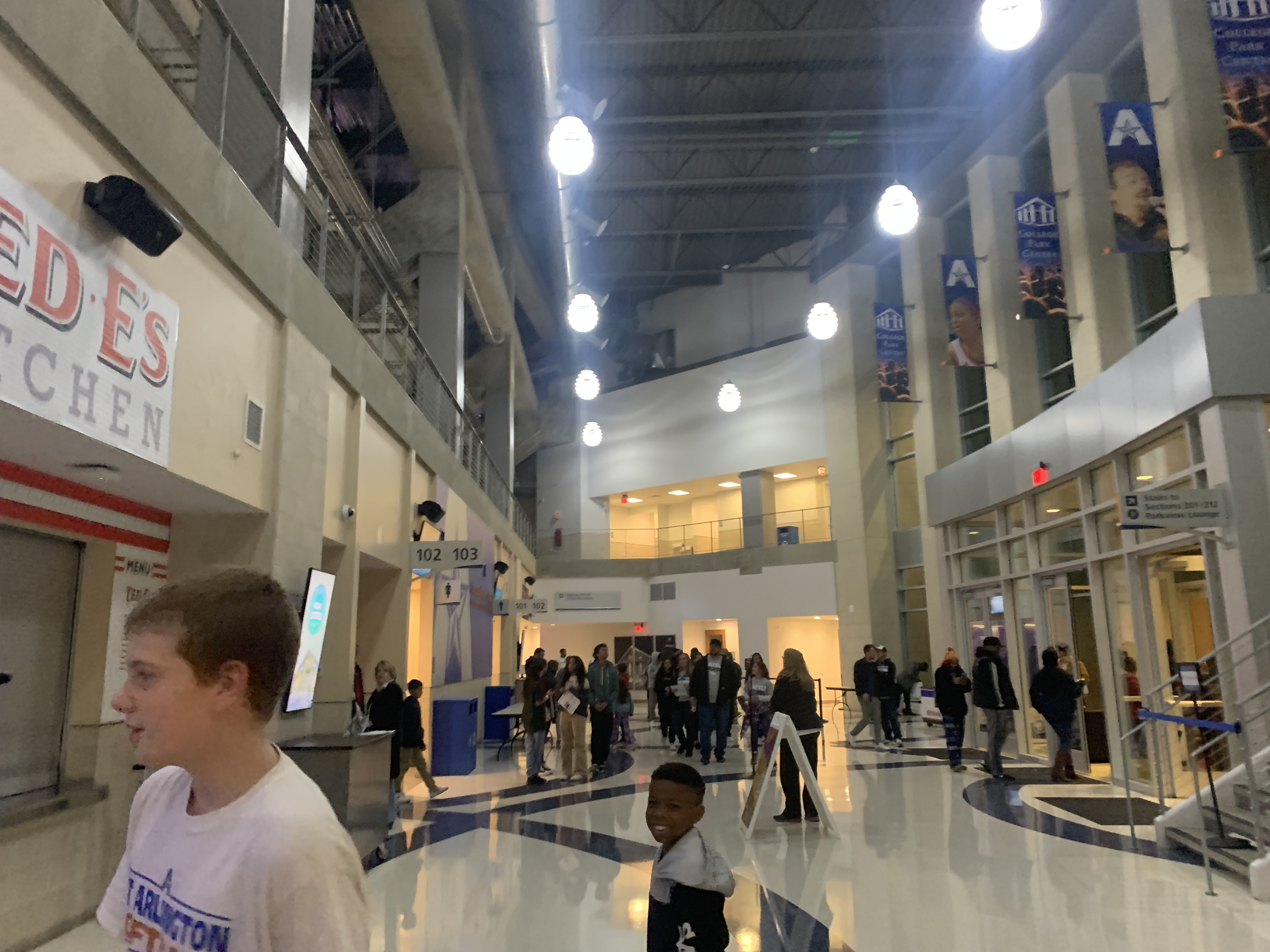
The concourse of College Park Center

Incoming UTA President James Spaniolo's first major decision with regards to athletics came in early 2005. The UTA student body had just approved a $2 an hour student fee for the resurrection of football and addition of two women's programs, golf and soccer. In January, President Spaniolo stated the university was going to pursue a new indoor arena for the university, which would replace Texas Hall for the athletic teams. The first step taken was a student vote in April 2005 that approved a $2 an hour student fee to fund the operations of the new indoor arena.

The planning continued as the location became more contentious than originally thought. There were two sites on Cooper Street that were thought to be the front runners. The City of Arlington even made an initial push for the university to build it off campus. Near the end of 2008, it was revealed the current location was in play, and that the special events arena would be part of a larger, mixed-use development. The final site selection approval from the Board of Regents came in early 2009. After approval, the physical planning for the arena and surrounding development began.

Ground breaking occurred on March 5, 2010. Along with numerous other cash gifts, in the fall of 2010, the university received $5 million for construction from Carrizo Oil & Gas, Inc.

The grand opening of the facility was held on February 1, 2012, with a doubleheader of UT Arlington basketball when the women and men both defeated UT San Antonio in front of a then-record crowd of 6,228.

The men's basketball team has a record of 121–54 at College Park Center, the women's record is 93–69, and the volleyball team sports a 104–66 home record (through the end of the 2023/24 season).

In 2016, the CPC became the permanent home of the Dallas Wings.

== Attendance ==
During the 2011–12 men's basketball season, UTA averaged 821 at Texas Hall while the last four games at CPC averaged 5,079. The team has averaged around 2,000 every year since opening. The 2015/16 season set an all-time program attendance average of 2,888 people per game.

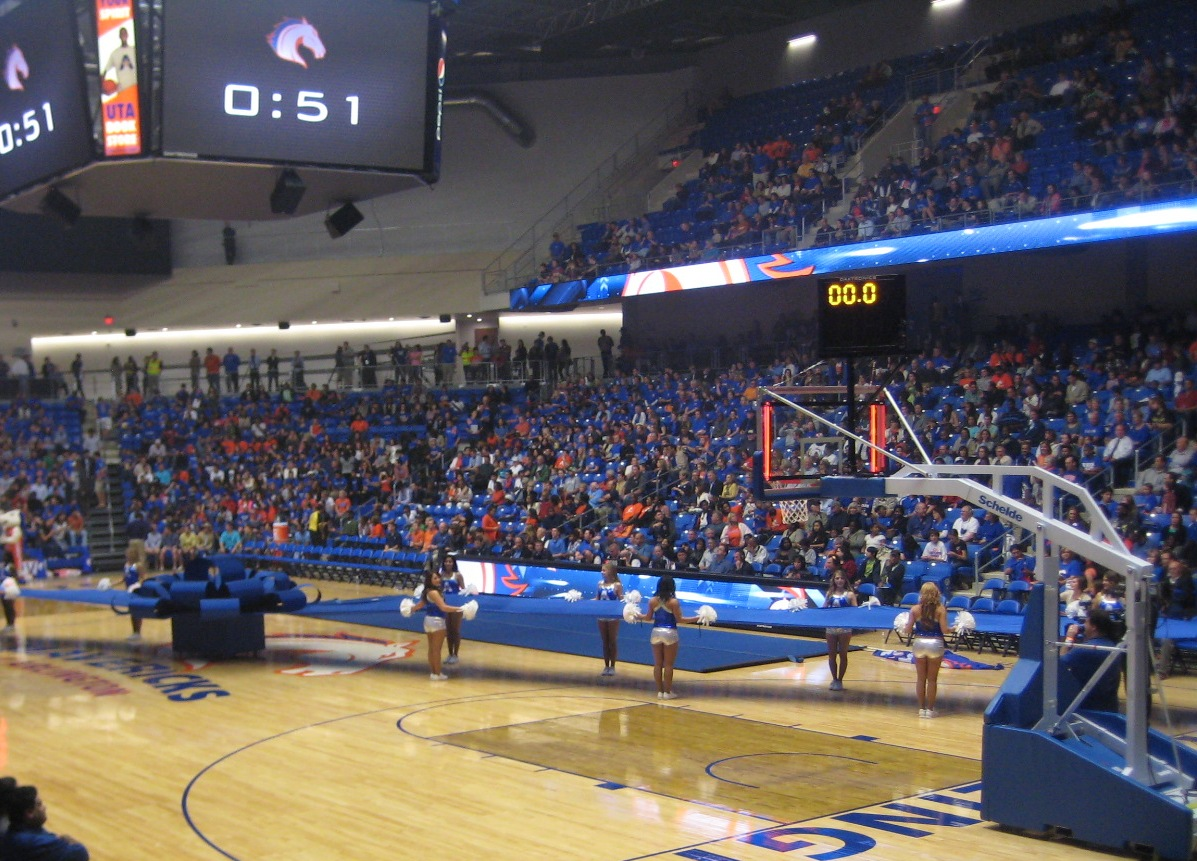
The dedication ceremony between the women's and men's game on CPC's opening night.

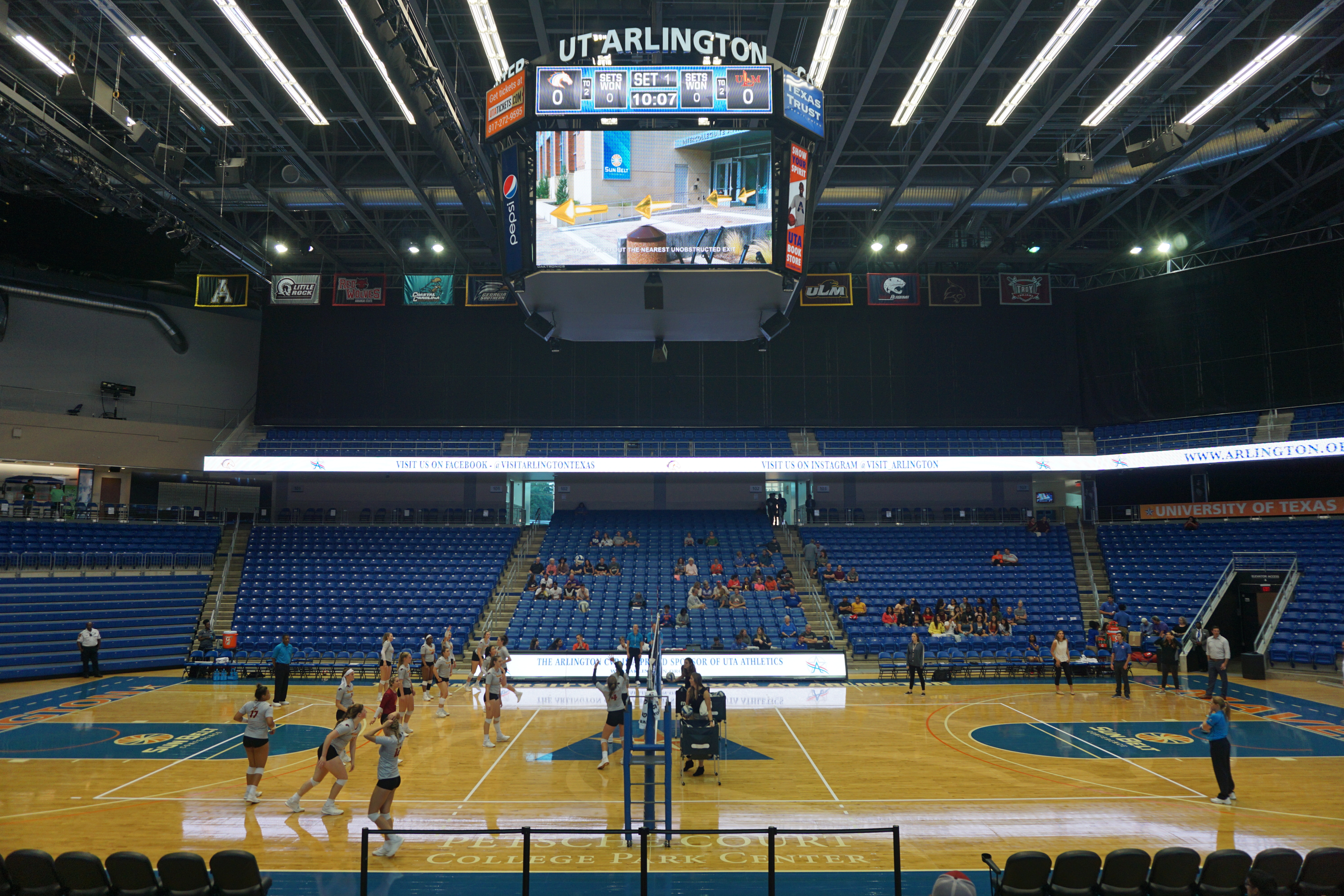
College Park Center before a UTA women's volleyball match

	Attendance	Opponent	Date	Result
1	6,421	Oklahoma^	Nov 16, 2012	L 59–63
2	6,336	CSU Bakersfield	March 22, 2017	L 76–80
3	6,228	UTSA^^	Feb 1, 2012	W 67–66
4	6,186	Georgia Southern^^^	Jan 24, 2019	W 81–48
5	6,107	North Texas	Dec 3, 2015	W 90–67
6	5,714	Louisiana^^^	Jan 16, 2020	W 79–52
7	5,590	Georgia Southern^^^	Feb 22, 2018	W 70–49
8	5,390	Akron	March 20, 2017	W 85–69
9	5,272	Texas State	Feb 11, 2012	W 73–53
10	5,183	Tarleton State	Feb 22, 2025	W 67–57

^ Denotes Homecoming game ^^ Facility grand-opening ^^^ Women's basketball game

CPC has completely sold out three times, all of them concerts. Drake held the 1st concert ever, which was not open to the public, but rather to the UTA students and faculty, with 7,000 in attendance. The other two sellouts belong to Reach Records, as both Unashamed Tour shows in 2012 and 2013 surpassed 7,000 in attendance respectively.

== Accolades ==
The U.S. Green Building Council recognized CPC with a LEED Gold certification.

In February 2012, the center was featured in a Billboard article about ten new and renovated venues were reshaping the national touring circuit.

== Events ==
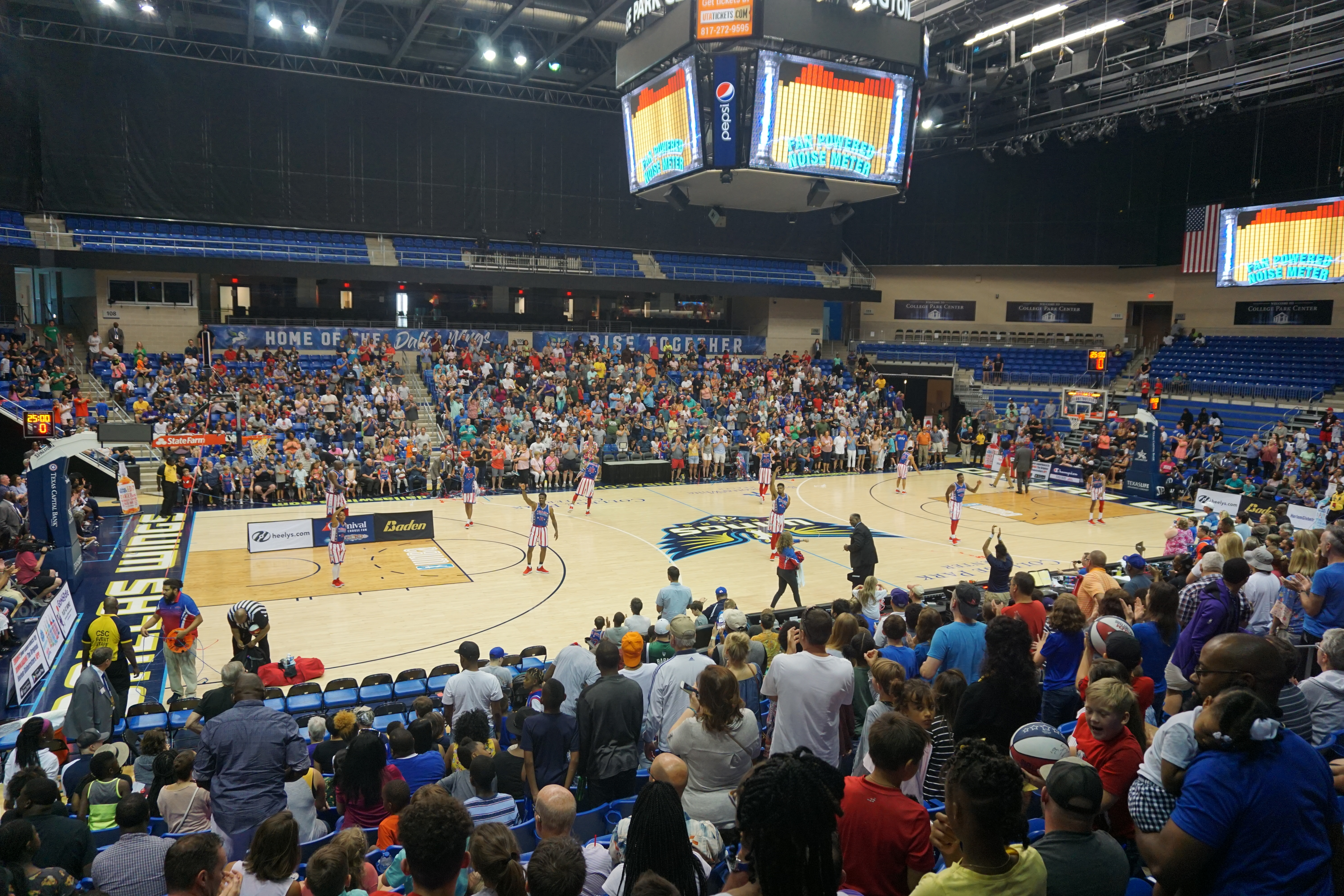
The Harlem Globetrotters at College Park Center in 2019

- ESPN Friday Night at the Fights, February 17, 2012.
- Drake, Club Paradise Tour, March 3, 2012.
- On June 10, 2012, the center hosted TNA Wrestling's Slammiversary pay per view, which celebrated the 10th anniversary of the organization.
- Passion Pit, September 2012.
- TobyMac, Eye on It Tour, October 2012.
- Unashamed Tour 2012: Come Alive (Reach Records), featuring Lecrae, Trip Lee, Tedashii, KB, PRo, Andy Mineo, and special guests Thi'sl and Propaganda, October 27, 2012
- Unashamed Tour V (2013) featuring Lecrae, Tedashii, Derek Minor, KB, and Andy Mineo, November 23, 2013
- TNA Wrestling's annual Slammiversary pay per view was once again held at the center on June 15, 2014, this time celebrating the company's 12th anniversary.
- On April 18, 2015, the center hosted "HBO After Dark Rumble" featuring the Junior Welterweight Championship match between undefeated Terence Crawford and top contender Thomas Dulorme.
- 2017 NCAA men's basketball NIT tournament hosted by UTA men's basketball team, March 20–22, 2017
- On October 6, 2017, the center hosted WWE Live.
- On December 10, 2022, the center hosted Ring of Honor's Final Battle.
- On May 30, 2026, Real American Freestyle will present RAF 09 at the center, an event that will be broadcast live on Fox Nation.

== See also ==
- List of NCAA Division I basketball arenas
- Maverick Speakers Series

Events and tenants
Preceded by BOK Center (as Tulsa Shock)	Home of the Dallas Wings; 2016 – present	Succeeded by current
Preceded by Impact Wrestling Zone	Host of Slammiversary; 2012 (X)	Succeeded by Agganis Arena
