= Chattanooga Mocs women's basketball =

Women's college basketball team

Chattanooga Mocs
2025–26 Chattanooga Mocs women's basketball team
- University: University of Tennessee at Chattanooga
- First season: 1974–75
- Head coach: Deandra Schirmer (2nd season)
- Location: Chattanooga, Tennessee
- Arena: McKenzie Arena (capacity: 10,928)
- Conference: SoCon
- Nickname: Mocs (since 1976); Mocettes (1974–76)
- Colors: Navy, old gold, and silver
- All-time record: 861–452 (.656)

NCAA Division I tournament second round
- 2004

NCAA Division I tournament appearances
- 1989, 1992, 2001, 2002, 2003, 2004, 2006, 2007, 2008, 2010, 2013, 2014, 2015, 2016, 2017, 2023, 2024

Conference tournament champions
- 1984, 1985, 1986, 1989, 1992, 2001, 2002, 2003, 2004, 2006, 2007, 2008, 2010, 2013, 2014, 2015, 2016, 2017, 2023, 2024

Conference regular-season champions
- 1984, 1985, 1986, 1991, 1992, 2000, 2001, 2002, 2003, 2004, 2005, 2006, 2007, 2008, 2009, 2010, 2013, 2014, 2015, 2016, 2017, 2020, 2024, 2026

The Chattanooga Mocs women's basketball team, formerly known as the Lady Mocs, represents the University of Tennessee at Chattanooga in Chattanooga, Tennessee, in NCAA women's basketball competition. The team is coached by Deandra Schirmer, and play their home games at McKenzie Arena.

The team has won 20 SoCon Tournament championships, five consecutively from 2013 through 2017, and have made 17 NCAA tournament appearances, most recently in 2024. The 2015–16 team began the season ranked 25th in the AP poll.

== Head coaches ==
The Chattanooga women's team has had only eight coaches in their 50-season history: Grace Keith, Sharon Fanning-Otto, Craig Parrott, Wes Moore, Jim Foster, Katie Burrows, Shane Poppies, and Deandra Schirmer.

=== Grace Keith ===
Keith had settled into teaching for two years at Chattanooga's Hixson Elementary School, following her 12 years of coaching the girls' basketball team at Hixson High School. Title IX became law in 1972 and began affecting the mostly male-dominated college athletics across the US, allowing women to participate. Harold Wilkes, then athletic director for UTC and friend to Keith's superiors, offered her a job as head coach for the UTC Mocettes. After a few chaotic months of building a program, the former intramural Chattanooga team began its varsity era in the Association for Intercollegiate Athletics for Women, eight years before the NCAA allowed women's basketball as a sport. In 1976, Keith retired from basketball to return to teaching.

Statistics overview
Season	Team	Overall	Conference	Standing	Postseason
Tennessee-Chattanooga (1974–1976)
1974–75	Tennessee-Chattanooga	8–11			
1975–76	Tennessee-Chattanooga	13–12			
Tennessee-Chattanooga:		21–23			
Total:		21–23 (.477)			

=== Sharon Fanning-Otto ===
One of the players Keith recruited was Chattanooga High School standout Sharon Fanning, who also played and later coached both UTC's volleyball (until 1978) and women's basketball teams. Fanning also renamed the Mocettes as the Lady Mocs. In 1982, the NCAA began hosting women's championships. The Lady Mocs joined the Southern Conference, which only included East Tennessee State, Marshall and Appalachian State University. UTC claimed the first regular season title that year and went on to win five straight titles under Fanning's leadership. She went on to become an eight-year head coach for the Kentucky Wildcats in 1987 and retired in 2012, following a 17-year coaching career with the Mississippi State Lady Bulldogs.

Statistics overview
Season	Team	Overall	Conference	Standing	Postseason
Tennessee-Chattanooga (1976–1982)
1976–77	Tennessee-Chattanooga	20–13			
1977–78	Tennessee-Chattanooga	19–7			
1978–79	Tennessee-Chattanooga	20–13			
1979–80	Tennessee-Chattanooga	15–13			
1980–81	Tennessee-Chattanooga	19–9			
Tennessee-Chattanooga:		93–55 (.628)			
Tennessee-Chattanooga (SoCon) (1982–1987)
1981–82	Tennessee-Chattanooga	14–17	3–2		
1982–83	Tennessee-Chattanooga	18–11	8–2		
1983–84	Tennessee-Chattanooga	26–5	9–1		
1984–85	Tennessee-Chattanooga	16–13	11–1		
1985–86	Tennessee-Chattanooga	19–10	10–2		
1986–87	Tennessee-Chattanooga	7–20	3–7		
Tennessee-Chattanooga:		100–76	44–15 (.746)		
Total:		193–131 (.596)			
National champion Postseason invitational champion Conference regular season champion Conference regular season and conference tournament champion Division regular season champion Division regular season and conference tournament champion Conference tournament champion

=== Craig Parrott ===
Craig Parrott had spent several years coaching high school basketball teams before Fanning offered him an assistant coaching job at UTC in 1986. The following year, Fanning departed for Kentucky and Parrott was asked to fill the position. He became the first coach to take the program to the NCAA Tournament, after winning the SoCon Tournament in 1989. In the 1991–92 season, he again led the team to the NCAA, after sharing the regular season conference title and winning the SoCon. In 1998, he returned to coaching high school teams in Walker County, Georgia, and retired in 2014.

Statistics overview
Season	Team	Overall	Conference	Standing	Postseason
Tennessee-Chattanooga (SoCon) (1987–1998)
1987–88	Tennessee-Chattanooga	19–9	6–4		
1988–89	Tennessee-Chattanooga	19–12	5–5		NCAA Tournament, Round 1
1989–90	Tennessee-Chattanooga	16–13	6–4		
1990–91	Tennessee-Chattanooga	20–8	8–2		
1991–92	Tennessee-Chattanooga	18–12	8–2	1st	NCAA Tournament, Round 1
1992–93	Tennessee-Chattanooga	15–13	9–3		
1993–94	Tennessee-Chattanooga	15–13	7–6		
1994–95	Tennessee-Chattanooga	10–17	6–8		
1995–96	Tennessee-Chattanooga	12–15	6–9		
1996–97	Chattanooga	12–15	6–9		
1997–98	Chattanooga	8–19	3–13		
Chattanooga:		164–146	70–65 (.519)		
Total:		164–146 (.529)			
National champion Postseason invitational champion Conference regular season champion Conference regular season and conference tournament champion Division regular season champion Division regular season and conference tournament champion Conference tournament champion

=== Wes Moore ===
Wes Moore became the fourth Chattanooga women's basketball coach in 1998. In 15 seasons, he led the Lady Mocs to 12 SoCon regular season titles, nine SoCon tournament championships, and nine NCAA Tournament berths, becoming the winningest coach in UTC and SoCon history. The six-time SoCon Coach of the Year had an overall record of 358–113, 222–42 (SoCon). In 2013, he went on to coach the NC State Wolfpack.

Statistics overview
Season	Team	Overall	Conference	Standing	Postseason
Chattanooga (SoCon) (1998–2013)
1998–99	Chattanooga	10–17	8–10	7th	
1999–2000	Chattanooga	26–5	17–1	1st	WNIT Second Round
2000–01	Chattanooga	24–7	15–3	1st	NCAA 1st Round
2001–02	Chattanooga	23–8	14–4	1st	NCAA 1st Round
2002–03	Chattanooga	26–5	16–2	1st	NCAA 1st Round
2003–04	Chattanooga	29–3	20–0	1st	NCAA 2nd Round
2004–05	Chattanooga	25–5	19–1	1st	WNIT Second Round
2005–06	Chattanooga	27–4	18–0	1st	NCAA 1st Round
2006–07	Chattanooga	25–8	15–3	1st	NCAA 1st Round
2007–08	Chattanooga	29–4	18–0	1st	NCAA 1st Round
2008–09	Chattanooga	22–10	17–3	1st	WNIT First Round
2009–10	Chattanooga	24–9	16–4	1st	NCAA 1st Round
2010–11	Chattanooga	17–14	13–7	3rd	
2011–12	Chattanooga	22–10	16–4	3rd	WNIT First Round
2012–13	Chattanooga	29–4	19–1	1st	NCAA 1st Round
Chattanooga:		358–113	222–42 (.841)		
Total:		358–113 (.760)			
National champion Postseason invitational champion Conference regular season champion Conference regular season and conference tournament champion Division regular season champion Division regular season and conference tournament champion Conference tournament champion

=== Jim Foster ===
On May 9, 2013, Chattanooga announced the hiring of Jim Foster to become the new head women's basketball coach. Foster has 37 years of coaching experience at St. Joseph's, Vanderbilt, Ohio State University and Chattanooga, along with four Big Ten Conference coach of the year awards. Soon after taking the job at Chattanooga, Foster was voted into the Women's Basketball Hall of Fame. Foster retired from coaching at the end of the 2018 season.

Statistics overview
Season	Team	Overall	Conference	Standing	Postseason
Chattanooga (SoCon) (2013–2018)
2013–14	Chattanooga	29–4	18–0	1st	NCAA 1st Round
2014–15	Chattanooga	29–4	14–0	1st	NCAA 1st Round
2015–16	Chattanooga	24–8	12–2	1st	NCAA 1st Round
2016–17	Chattanooga	21–11	12–2	1st	NCAA 1st Round
2017–18	Chattanooga	17–13	8–6	3rd	WNIT 1st Round
Chattanooga:		120–40	67–10		
Total:		120–40 (.750)			
National champion Postseason invitational champion Conference regular season champion Conference regular season and conference tournament champion Division regular season champion Division regular season and conference tournament champion Conference tournament champion

=== Katie Burrows ===
In May 2018, Katie Burrows was named as the new head women's basketball coach. An alumna of Chattanooga, Burrows served as an assistant coach under Moore and Foster, respectively.

Statistics overview
Season	Team	Overall	Conference	Standing	Postseason
Chattanooga (SoCon) (2018–2022)
2018–19	Chattanooga	14-17	8-6	3rd	
2019–20	Chattanooga	11-18	10-4	T-1st	
2020–21	Chattanooga	14–10	9-5	3rd	
2021–22	Chattanooga	7–23	5-9	6th	
Chattanooga:		45-69 (.395)	31–25 (.554)		
Total:		45-69 (.395)			
National champion Postseason invitational champion Conference regular season champion Conference regular season and conference tournament champion Division regular season champion Division regular season and conference tournament champion Conference tournament champion

=== Shawn Poppie ===
On March 30, 2022, Shawn Poppie was named as the new head women's basketball coach. Previously he was assistant coach under Kenny Brooks at the Virginia Tech since 2016.

Statistics overview
Season	Team	Overall	Conference	Standing	Postseason
Chattanooga (SoCon) (2022–2024)
2022–23	Chattanooga	20–13	9–5	T–2nd	NCAA 1st Round
2023–24	Chattanooga	28–5	13–1	1st	NCAA 1st Round
Chattanooga:		48–18	22–6		
Total:		48–18			
National champion Postseason invitational champion Conference regular season champion Conference regular season and conference tournament champion Division regular season champion Division regular season and conference tournament champion Conference tournament champion

=== Deandra Schirmer ===
On April 4, 2024, Deandra Schirmer was named as the 8th head women's basketball coach. Previously she was the women's basketball head coach at Valdosta State from 2019 to 2024.

Statistics overview
Season	Team	Overall	Conference	Standing	Postseason
Chattanooga (SoCon) (2024–present)
2024–25	Chattanooga	17–15	9-5	2nd	WNIT 2nd Round
2025–26	Chattanooga	20–10	10-4	1st	TBD
Chattanooga:		37–25	19-9		
Total:		37–25			
National champion Postseason invitational champion Conference regular season champion Conference regular season and conference tournament champion Division regular season champion Division regular season and conference tournament champion Conference tournament champion

== NCAA tournament results ==
The Mocs have appeared in seventeen NCAA Tournaments, with a combined record of 1–17.

Year	Seed	Round	Opponent	Result
1989	#12	First Round	#5 Georgia	L 69–90
1992	#12	First Round	#5 Clemson	L 72–76
2001	#12	First Round	#5 Clemson	L 49–51
2002	#13	First Round	#4 Penn State	L 67–82
2003	#12	First Round	#5 South Carolina	L 54–68
2004	#10	First Round; Second Round	#7 Rutgers #2 Vanderbilt	W 74–69; L 44–60
2006	#12	First Round	#5 South Carolina	L 59–69
2007	#12	First Round	#5 Baylor	L 55–68
2008	#12	First Round	#5 Kansas State	L 59–69
2010	#13	First Round	#4 Oklahoma State	L 63–70
2013	#11	First Round	#6 Nebraska	L 59–72
2014	#11	First Round	#6 Syracuse	L 53–59
2015	#7	First Round	#10 Pittsburgh	L 40–51
2016	#12	First Round	#5 Mississippi State	L 50–60
2017	#13	First Round	#4 Louisville	L 62–82
2023	#16	First Round	#1 Virginia Tech	L 58–33
2024	#14	First Round	#3 NC State	L 64–44

== See also ==
- Chattanooga Mocs
