= Wes Moore (basketball) =

American basketball coach (born 1957)

Current position
- Title: Head coach
- Team: NC State
- Conference: ACC
- Record: 322–106 (.752)

Biographical details
- Born: April 22, 1957 (age 69); Texas City, Texas, U.S.
- Education: Johnson University; University of Tennessee

Coaching career (HC unless noted)
- 1984–1987: Johnson Bible (men's assistant)
- 1987–1993: Maryville
- 1993–1995: NC State (assistant)
- 1995–1998: Francis Marion
- 1998–2013: Chattanooga
- 2013–present: NC State

Head coaching record
- Overall: 880–275 (.762)
- Tournaments: 18–19 (NCAA Division I); 3–6 (WNIT); 3–2 (NCAA Division II); 3–5 (NCAA Division III)

Accomplishments and honors

Championships
- Peach Belt North Division (1998); Peach Belt tournament (1998); 12× SoCon regular season (2000–10, 2013); 9× SoCon tournament (2001–04, 2006–08, 2010, 2013); 2× ACC regular season (2022, 2025); 3× ACC tournament (2020, 2021, 2022); NCAA Regional – Final Four (2024)

Awards
- 3× Converse/WBCA District 5 Division III Coach of the Year (1990, 1993, 1994); Peach Belt Coach of the Year (1997); 6× SoCon Coach of the Year (2000, 2002, 2005, 2006, 2008, 2013); 4× ACC Coach of the Year (2017, 2021, 2022, 2025 ); WBCA National Coach of the Year (2021)

Frank Weston Moore (born April 22, 1957) is an American college basketball coach who is the current women's basketball head coach at NC State. A head coach at all three levels of NCAA women's college basketball since 1987, Moore has been named Coach of the Year eight times by three conferences and over 20 regular season or conference tournament championships.

Moore grew up in Dallas and played college basketball at Johnson Bible College. He began his coaching career as a men's basketball coach at Johnson Bible in 1984. Then in 1987, Moore became head coach for a struggling women's basketball program at Maryville College and instantly turned the program into a winner, with five NCAA Division III Tournament appearances and over 130 wins in six seasons. The Women's Basketball Coaches Association awarded Moore three regional Coach of the Year honors.

From 1993 to 1995, Moore was a women's basketball assistant coach at NC State under Kay Yow. Then from 1995 to 1998, Moore was head coach at Francis Marion, where he achieved an appearance in the 1998 NCAA Division II Final Four. In his first NCAA Division I head coaching position, Moore was head coach at Chattanooga from 1998 to 2013, during which he led the Mocs to 12 Southern Conference (SoCon) regular season championships and nine NCAA Division I Tournament appearances. With over 350 wins at Chattanooga, Moore has the most career wins in program history and won five Coach of the Year honors from the SoCon.

Moore returned to NC State in 2013, this time as head coach. In his first seven seasons, Moore led NC State to four NCAA Tournament appearances and the 2020, 2021 and 2022 ACC Tournament titles. He was the Atlantic Coast Conference's Coach of the Year in women's basketball in 2017, 2022 and 2025.

== Early life and education ==
Born in Texas City, Texas, Moore grew up in Dallas. At Johnson Bible College (now Johnson University) in Knoxville, Tennessee, Moore played at point guard and graduated in 1984 with a degree in religious studies. Moore then enrolled at the University of Tennessee, where he earned a bachelor's degree in physical education in 1986 and master's in the same subject in 1987.

== Coaching career ==
=== Early coaching career (1984–1995) ===
From 1984 to 1987, Moore was a men's basketball assistant coach at Johnson Bible College.

After completing graduate school, Moore became women's basketball head coach at Maryville College in 1987. Moore inherited a Maryville team that won only a single game the previous season. He immediately turned around the program to a 15–12 record in his debut season and would have winning records in all of his six seasons as head coach, with five straight appearances in the NCAA Division III Tournament from 1989 to 1993 and three Converse/Women's Basketball Coaches Association District 5 Coach of the Year honors in 1990, 1992, and 1993. Moore's cumulative record at Maryville was 131–36.

From 1993 to 1995, Moore was an assistant coach for NC State women's basketball under Kay Yow. During those two seasons, NC State went 34–24 and qualified for the Sweet 16 round of the NCAA Division I Tournament. Moore also directed Yow's basketball camp in the summer of 1994.

=== Francis Marion (1995–1998) ===
In his second head coaching job, Moore was head women's basketball coach at Francis Marion College from 1995 to 1998, during which he went 69–20. Following a 21–8 season in 1996–97, Moore was the Peach Belt Conference Coach of the Year. The 1997–98 Francis Marion team finished 30–3, advanced to the Final Four round of the 1998 NCAA Division II Tournament, and was ranked fifth in the final coaches' poll.

=== Chattanooga (1998–2013) ===
In 1998, Moore took his first NCAA Division I head coaching job at Chattanooga. After a 10–17 debut season, Moore led Chattanooga to the Southern Conference regular season title and Women's National Invitation Tournament (WNIT) appearance in 1999–2000. Moore served as head coach at Chattanooga for 15 seasons and ended his tenure there with the most career wins in program history at 358.

In the 2003–04 season, Chattanooga set a school record for wins with a 29–3 record and had a historically best 27-game winning streak that included an NCAA tournament first round win over Rutgers.

On April 26, 2010, Moore accepted a job offer to be head coach at East Carolina. However, three days later, Moore reversed his decision in order to stay at Chattanooga.

Under Moore, Chattanooga won 12 SoCon regular season titles, including 11 straight from 2000 to 2010 and in his final season in 2013. Chattanooga also won nine SoCon Tournament titles (2001–04, 2006–08, 2010, and 2013) and appeared as an automatic qualifier to the NCAA Tournament in those years. Moore won six SoCon Coach of the Year honors in 2000, 2004, 2005, 2006, 2008, and 2013. Chattanooga also had four WNIT appearances in 2000, 2005, 2009, and 2012.

=== NC State (2013–present) ===
On April 5, 2013, Moore resigned from Chattanooga to become head coach at NC State, 20 years after he first was an assistant coach there. In Moore's debut season, NC State finished 25–8 and fourth in the ACC standings with an appearance in the NCAA Division I Tournament. Then in 2014–15, NC State finished 18–15 and advanced to the third round of the WNIT. The 2015–16 team finished 20–11 with no postseason tournament appearance.

In 2016–17, NC State improved to 23–9 and appeared in the second round of the NCAA tournament. The ACC named Moore Coach of the Year in women's basketball on March 1, 2017.

Appearing in that round for the first time since 2007, NC State qualified for the NCAA Tournament Sweet 16 in 2018 and 2019.

In the 2019–20 season, NC State finished 29–4 and won the ACC tournament for the program's first conference tournament title since 1991. However, due to COVID-19, the 2020 NCAA tournament was canceled.

Moore's 2020-2021 NC State continued the success of the previous seasons success by repeating as ACC tournament champions, and earning road wins against two teams ranked No. 1 in the regular season (South Carolina and Louisville). The Wolfpack earned a top seed in the 2021 NCAA tournament, a program first.

Through the 2019–20 season, Moore had a 168–62 overall record including 77–37 in Atlantic Coast Conference (ACC) play, with five NCAA Division I Tournament appearances.

== Head coaching record ==
Record table
Season	Team	Overall	Conference	Standing	Postseason
Maryville Scots (NCAA Division III independent) (1987–1993)
1987–88	Maryville	15–12			
1988–89	Maryville	23–6			NCAA Division III First Round
1989–90	Maryville	23–5			NCAA Division III Sweet 16
1990–91	Maryville	23–6			NCAA Division III Sweet 16
1991–92	Maryville	24–4			NCAA Division III First Round
1992–93	Maryville	23–3			NCAA Division III Sweet 16
Maryville:		131–36 (.784)			
Francis Marion Patriots (Peach Belt Conference) (1995–1998)
1995–96	Francis Marion	18–9	13–5	2nd	
1996–97	Francis Marion	21–8	14–4	2nd	NCAA Division II Second Round
1997–98	Francis Marion	30–3	15–1	1st (North)	NCAA Division II Final Four
Francis Marion:		69–20 (.775)			
Chattanooga Lady Mocs (Southern Conference) (1998–2013)
1998–99	Chattanooga	10–17	8–10	T–7th	
1999–00	Chattanooga	26–5	17–1	1st	WNIT Second Round
2000–01	Chattanooga	24–7	15–3	T–1st	NCAA First Round
2001–02	Chattanooga	23–8	14–4	T–1st	NCAA First Round
2002–03	Chattanooga	26–5	16–2	1st	NCAA First Round
2003–04	Chattanooga	29–3	20–0	1st	NCAA Second Round
2004–05	Chattanooga	25–5	19–1	1st	WNIT Second Round
2005–06	Chattanooga	27–4	18–0	1st	NCAA First Round
2006–07	Chattanooga	25–8	15–3	T–1st	NCAA First Round
2007–08	Chattanooga	29–4	18–0	1st	NCAA First Round
2008–09	Chattanooga	22–10	17–3	1st	WNIT First Round
2009–10	Chattanooga	24–9	16–4	1st	NCAA First Round
2010–11	Chattanooga	17–14	13–7	3rd	
2011–12	Chattanooga	22–10	16–4	3rd	WNIT First Round
2012–13	Chattanooga	29–4	19–1	1st	NCAA First Round
Chattanooga:		358–113 (.760)	222–42 (.841)		
NC State Wolfpack (Atlantic Coast Conference) (2013–present)
2013–14	NC State	25–8	11–5	4th	NCAA First Round
2014–15	NC State	18–15	7–9	T–9th	WNIT Third Round
2015–16	NC State	20–11	10–6	T–5th	
2016–17	NC State	23–9	12–4	T–4th	NCAA Second Round
2017–18	NC State	26–9	11–5	T–4th	NCAA Sweet Sixteen
2018–19	NC State	28–6	12–4	T–3rd	NCAA Sweet Sixteen
2019–20	NC State	28–4	14–4	2nd	Tournament not held
2020–21	NC State	22–3	13–2	2nd	NCAA Sweet Sixteen
2021–22	NC State	32–4	17–1	1st	NCAA Elite Eight
2022–23	NC State	20–12	9–9	T–8th	NCAA First Round
2023–24	NC State	31–7	13–5	T–2nd	NCAA Final Four
2024–25	NC State	28–7	16–2	T–1st	NCAA Sweet Sixteen
2025–26	NC State	21–11	13–5	4th	NCAA Second Round
NC State:		322–106 (.752)	158–61 (.721)		
Total:		880–275 (.762)			
National champion Postseason invitational champion Conference regular season champion Conference regular season and conference tournament champion Division regular season champion Division regular season and conference tournament champion Conference tournament champion

== See also ==
- List of college women's basketball career coaching wins leaders
