= 2019–20 Samford Bulldogs women's basketball team =

Homewood, Alabama NCAA team

2019–20 Samford Bulldogs women's basketball

Southern Conference regular season co-champions Southern Conference tournament Champions

NCAA tournament
- Conference: Southern Conference
- Record: 18–14 (10–4 SoCon)
- Head coach: Carley Kuhns (1st season)
- Assistant coaches: Jon Bollier; Chandler Merkerson; Sally Higgins
- Home arena: Pete Hanna Center

2019–20 Southern Conference women's basketball standings
	Conf.				Overall
Team	W		L	PCT	W		L	PCT
UNC Greensboro	10	–	4	.714	21	–	8	.724
Samford†	10	–	4	.714	15	–	14	.517
Chattanooga	10	–	4	.714	11	–	17	.393
Furman	8	–	6	.571	12	–	11	.522
Wofford	8	–	6	.571	15	–	14	.517
East Tennessee State	4	–	10	.286	9	–	20	.310
Mercer	4	–	10	.286	7	–	22	.241
Western Carolina	2	–	12	.143	5	–	24	.172
† 2020 SoCon Tournament winner Rankings from AP poll

The 2019–20 Samford Bulldogs women's basketball team represented the Samford University during the 2019–20 NCAA Division I women's basketball season. The Bulldogs, led by 1st-year head coach Carley Kuhns, played their home games at Pete Hanna Center. They were members of the Southern Conference (SoCon)

== Previous season ==
The Bulldogs finished the 2018–2019 season 10–20, 5–9 in conference play. They lost in the quarterfinals of the Southern Conference tournament to Furman. They were led by Mike Morris who would coach his 17th and final season as Samford Women's Basketball coach. Morris announced he was retiring on March 18, 2019. On April 10, 2019, Carley Kuhns was hired from Valdosta State University to become the third head coach in history.

== Roster ==
2019–20 Samford Bulldogs women's basketball team
Players
Coaches

Pos.	#	Name	Height	Year	Hometown
G/F	3	Shauntai Battle	5 ft 9 in (1.75 m)	Jr	Mobile, Alabama
G	4	Audra Leipold	5 ft 8 in (1.73 m)	RS Fr	Seffner, Florida
G	11	Paige Serup	5 ft 6 in (1.68 m)	Sr	Edmond, Oklahoma
G	12	Charity Brown	5 ft 8 in (1.73 m)	Sr	Tuscaloosa, Alabama
F	14	Christen Carter	5 ft 10 in (1.78 m)	RS Sr	Jacksonville, Florida
G	15	Ta'Naisha Hill	5 ft 7 in (1.7 m)	RS Sr	Huntsville, Alabama
G	21	Katie Allen	5 ft 11 in (1.8 m)	RS Jr	Albertville, Alabama
G	22	Raven Omar	5 ft 3 in (1.6 m)	Jr	Pinson, Alabama
F	23	Kathleen Wheeler	5 ft 10 in (1.78 m)	Fr	Priceville, Alabama
G	25	Sarah Myers	6 ft 0 in (1.83 m)	Sr	Cumming, Georgia
F	32	Olivia Crozier	6 ft 1 in (1.85 m)	Sr	Madison, Indiana
F	33	Makaila Woolard	6 ft 0 in (1.83 m)	Jr	Dandridge, Tennessee
F	35	Samantha Fitzgerald	6 ft 0 in (1.83 m)	Sr	Somerset, Kentucky
C	44	Leslie Golden	6 ft 5 in (1.96 m)	RS Jr	Columbia, Tennessee
C	45	Natalie Armstrong	6 ft 2 in (1.88 m)	Jr	Norcross, Georgia

Head coach

Carley Kuhns (Valdosta State)

Assistant coach(es)

- Jon Boiller (Piedmont College)
- Chandler Merkerson(North Florida)
- Sally Higgins (West Texas A&M)

Legend

- (C) Team captain
- (S) Suspended
- (I) Ineligible
- (W) Walk-on
- Injured
- Current redshirt

Roster
Last update: March 6, 2020

== Schedule and results ==
Date time, TV	Rank^{#}	Opponent^{#}	Result	Record	Site (attendance) city, state
Exhibition
November 2, 2019*; 2:00 pm		Oglethorpe University	W 86–52		Pete Hanna Center; Homewood, AL
Non-conference regular season
November 5, 2019*; 6:00 pm, ESPN3		Montevallo	W 81–60	1–0	Pete Hanna Center (408); Homewood, AL
November 9, 2019*; 1:00 pm		at Kennesaw State	L 55–60	1–1	KSU Convocation Center (448); Kennesaw, GA
November 12, 2019*; 6:00 pm, ESPN+		Troy	L 65–74	1–2	Pete Hanna Center (199); Homewood, AL
November 16, 2019*; 1:00 pm, SECN+		at Florida	L 48–84	1–3	O'Connell Center (1,080); Gainesville, FL
November 17, 2019*; 1:00 pm, ACCNX		at No. 12 Florida State	L 59–88	1–4	Donald L. Tucker Center (2,445); Tallahassee, FL
November 21, 2019*; 6:00 pm, ESPN+		at UT Martin	L 75–80 ^{OT}	1–5	Skyhawk Arena (1,511); Martin, TN
November 24, 2019*; 2:00 pm, ESPN+		Tennessee Tech	L 57–72	1-6	Pete Hanna Center (227); Homewood, AL
November 27, 2019*; 11:00 am, ESPN+		at North Alabama	W 79–63	2–6	Flowers Hall (449); Florence, AL
December 1, 2019*; 3:00 pm		at Alabama State	W 83–48	3–6	Dunn–Oliver Acadome (452); Montgomery, AL
December 3, 2019*; 6:00 pm		at UAB	L 69–76	3–7	Bartow Arena (424); Birmingham, AL
December 8, 2019*; 1:00 pm, SECN+		at No. 15 Kentucky	L 49–79	3–8	Memorial Coliseum (3,795); Lexington, KY
December 15, 2019*; 2:00 pm, ESPN+		Western Kentucky	L 84–88	3–9	Pete Hanna Center (151); Homewood, AL
December 20, 2019*; 2:00 pm, ESPN+		at Murray State	W 84–56	4–9	CFSB Center (425); Murray, KY
December 29, 2019*; 12:00 pm, ESPN+		at Fordham; Fordham Holiday Classic	L 37–68	4–10	Rose Hill Gymnasium; Bronx, NY
December 30, 2019*; 12:00 pm		vs. Hofstra; Fordham Holiday Classic	W 65–45	5–10	Rose Hill Gymnasium; Bronx, NY
SoCon regular season
January 9, 2020; 10:00 am, ESPN+		at Wofford	W 74–58	6–10 (1–0)	Jerry Richardson Indoor Stadium (1,852); Spartanburg, SC
January 11, 2020; 3:30 pm, ESPN3		at Furman	L 69–77	6–11 (1–1)	Timmons Arena; Greenville, SC
January 18, 2020; 4:30 pm, ESPN3		Mercer	W 72–64	7–11 (2–1)	Pete Hanna Center (397); Homewood, AL
January 23, 2020; 6:00 pm, ESPN+		Chattanooga	W 60–46	8–11 (3–1)	Pete Hanna Center (251); Homewood, AL
January 25, 2020; 4:30 pm, ESPN3		East Tennessee State	W 68–34	9–11 (4–1)	Pete Hanna Center (278); Homewood, AL
January 30, 2020; 6:00 pm, ESPN+		at Western Carolina	W 62–50	10–11 (5–1)	Ramsey Center (310); Cullowhee, NC
February 1, 2020; 3:00 pm, ESPN3		at UNC Greensboro	W 56–42	11–11 (6–1)	Fleming Gymnasium; Greensboro, NC
February 6, 2020; 6:00 pm, ESPN+		Furman	L 59–72	11–12 (6–2)	Pete Hanna Center (171); Homewood, AL
February 8, 2020; 2:00 pm, ESPN3		Wofford	L 63–69	11–13 (6–3)	Pete Hanna Center (211); Homewood, AL
February 15, 2020; 1:00 pm, ESPN3		at Mercer	W 60–54	12–13 (7–3)	Hawkins Arena (1,871); Macon, GA
February 20, 2020; 6:00 pm, ESPN+		at East Tennessee State	W 76–60	13–13 (8–3)	J. Madison Brooks Gymnasium (523); Johnson City, TN
February 22, 2020; 1:00 pm, ESPN3		at Chattanooga	L 58–64	13–14 (8–4)	McKenzie Arena; Chattanooga, TN
February 27, 2020; 6:00 pm, ESPN+		UNC Greensboro	W 69–57	14-14 (9–4)	Pete Hanna Center (398); Homewood, AL
February 29, 2020; 1:00 pm, ESPN3		at Western Carolina	W 70–53	15–14 (10–4)	Pete Hanna Center (375); Homewood, AL
SoCon Tournament
March 5, 2020; 10:00 am, ESPN+	(1)	vs. (8) Westen Carolina; Quarterfinals	W 77–62	16–14	Harrah's Cherokee Center (3,254); Asheville, NC
March 6, 2020; 10:00 am, ESPN+	(1)	vs. (4) Furman; Semifinals	W 75–45	17–14	Harrah's Cherokee Center (3,612); Asheville, NC
March 8, 2020; 12:00 pm, ESPN+	(1)	vs. (3) UNC Greensboro; Championship	W 59–54	18–14	Harrah's Cherokee Center (1,161); Asheville, NC
*Non-conference game. ^{#}Rankings from AP Poll. (#) Tournament seedings in parentheses.
