= Maverick Speakers Series =

The Maverick Speakers Series is a distinguished lecture series at The University of Texas at Arlington in Arlington, Texas.

Typically, one person speaks each month during the academic calendar. The Maverick Speakers Series is designed to bring timely issues to light in an engaging and conversational way. Tickets are required and are free (two per person) to anyone actively affiliated with the university (students, faculty, and staff), those not actively affiliated with the university must pay $5 to reserve a ticket. Many lectures include audience question-and-answer sessions and public meetings or book-signings. Lectures are held either in the College Park Center or Texas Hall on the UT Arlington campus.

The Maverick Speakers Series began in August 2008 with New York Times columnist and Pulitzer Prize-winner Thomas L. Friedman. Some other past speakers include entrepreneur Daymond John, actor (and UTA alum) Lou Diamond Phillips, astronaut Anousheh Ansari, entrepreneurs Ben and Jerry, CNN anchor Anderson Cooper, basketball legend Magic Johnson, primatologist Jane Goodall, neurosurgeon Sanjay Gupta, scientist Bill Nye, news correspondent Soledad O'Brien and actress Mia Farrow.
