= Sharon Fanning =

American basketball coach

Sharon Fanning-Otis
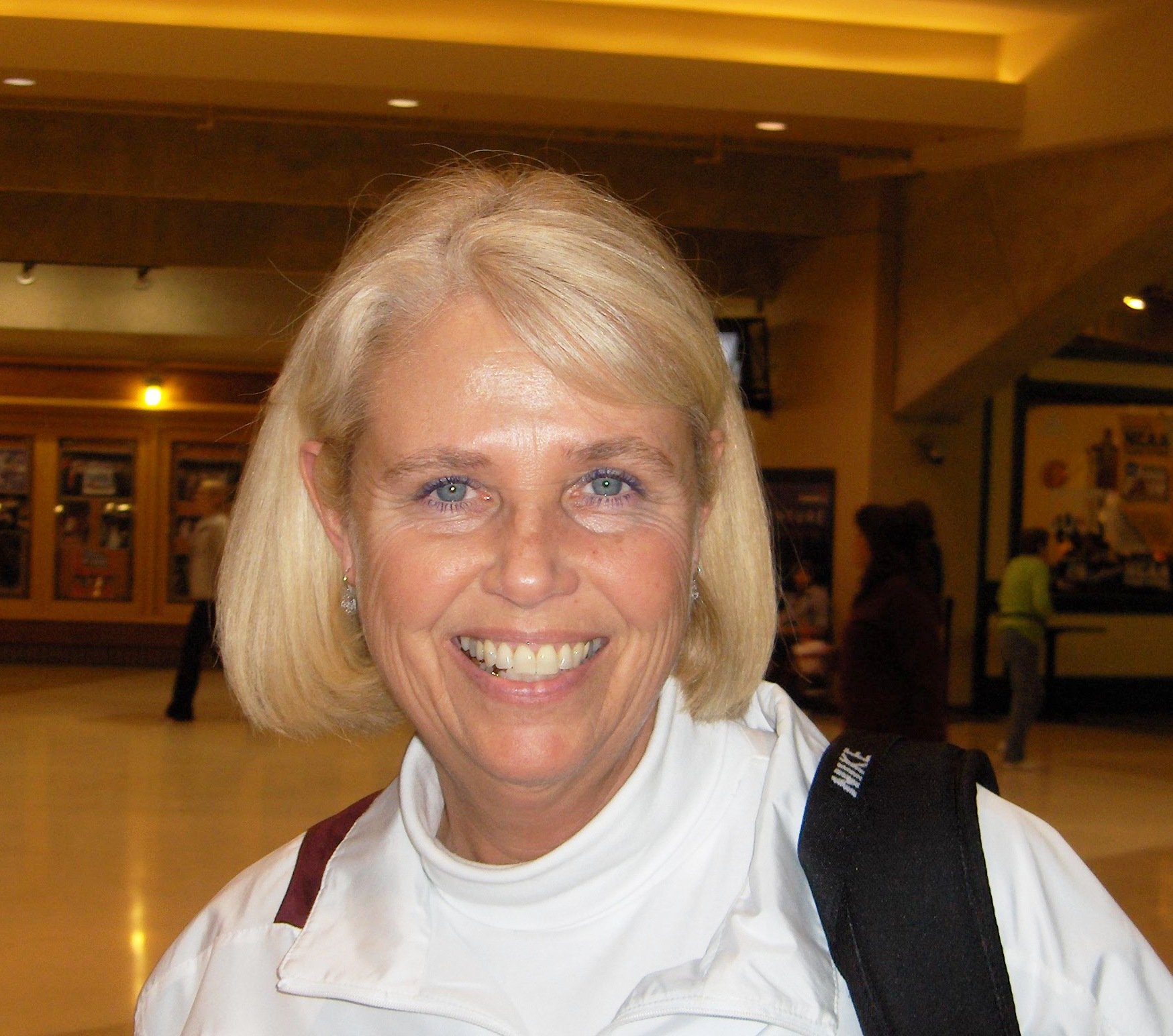
- Fanning-Otis in 2011

Biographical details
- Born: December 14, 1953 (age 72)

Coaching career (HC unless noted)
- 1975: Tennessee (GA)
- 1976–1987: Chattanooga
- 1987–1995: Kentucky
- 1995–2012: Mississippi State

Head coaching record
- Overall: 608–460 (.569)

Accomplishments and honors

Championships
- WNIT Champion (1990); 5× SoCon Champion (1982–1986)

Awards
- SEC Coach of the Year (2000); 2× SoCon Coach of the Year (1984, 1985)

Sharon Cable Fanning-Otis (born December 14, 1953) is the former women's basketball program head coach at Mississippi State. During her 17-year head coach career with the Bulldogs, then team had a 281–232 (.548) record. During her tenure, she posted 6 winning seasons and 7 postseason appearances. She led MSU to its inaugural appearance in the AP Final Poll, and to its first two 20-win seasons. The 2003 team went 24–8, and finished in the Top 10. For the 2004 season, MSU set a program record for longest winning streak at 12 games. She retired after the 2011–2012 season.

She attended Chattanooga High School, and later University of Tennessee at Chattanooga where she played basketball and volleyball. She started her career as a graduate-assistant coach in 1975 at Tennessee. From 1976 to 1978, she served as the women's volleyball program head coach at UTC; she would serve as women's basketball program head coach until 1987. From 1987 to 1995 she served as the Kentucky Wildcats women's basketball program head coach with an overall career record at 608–457.

== Head coaching record ==
Record table
Season	Team	Overall	Conference	Standing	Postseason
Chattanooga Lady Mocs (Southern Conference) (1976–1987)
1976–77	Chattanooga	20–13			
1977–78	Chattanooga	19–7			
1978–79	Chattanooga	20–13	3–0		
1979–80	Chattanooga	15–13	3–1		
1980–81	Chattanooga	19–9	2–1		
1981–82	Chattanooga	14–17	4–2		
1982–83	Chattanooga	18–11	8–2		
1983–84	Chattanooga	26–5	9–1		WNIT Finals
1984–85	Chattanooga	16–13	11–1		
1985–86	Chattanooga	19–10	10–2		
1986–87	Chattanooga	7–20	3–9		
Chattanooga:		193–131 (.596)	53– (.736)		
Kentucky Wildcats (SEC) (1987–1995)
1987–88	Kentucky	14–15	0–9		
1988–89	Kentucky	12–16	3–6		
1989–90	Kentucky	23–8	3–6		WNIT Champions
1990–91	Kentucky	20–9	4–5		NCAA First Round
1991–92	Kentucky	16–14	5–6		
1992–93	Kentucky	18–10	5–6		
1993–94	Kentucky	17–11	5–6		
1994–95	Kentucky	14–14	4–7		
Kentucky:		134–97 (.580)	29–51 (.363)		
Mississippi State (SEC) (1995–2012)
1995–96	Mississippi State	13–14	4–7		
1996–97	Mississippi State	11–16	1–11		
1997–98	Mississippi State	14–15	4–10		WNIT First Round
1998–99	Mississippi State	17–11	7–7		NCAA First Round
1999–00	Mississippi State	24–8	8–6		NCAA Second Round
2000–01	Mississippi State	17–14	4–10		WNIT Quarterfinals
2001–02	Mississippi State	19–12	8–6	T-4th	NCAA Second Round
2002–03	Mississippi State	24–8	10–4	3rd	NCAA Second Round
2003–04	Mississippi State	14–15	7–7	T-7th	
2004–05	Mississippi State	17–11	6–8	6th	WNIT First Round
2005–06	Mississippi State	6–22	1–13	12th	
2006–07	Mississippi State	17–13	7–8	6th	WNIT Second Round
2007–08	Mississippi State	16–15	4–10	9th	WNIT First Round
2008–09	Mississippi State	23–10	8–6	6th	NCAA Second Round
2009–10	Mississippi State	21–12	9–7	T-3rd	NCAA Sweet 16
2010–11	Mississippi State	13–17	4–12	11th	
2011–12	Mississippi State	14–16	4–10		
Mississippi State:		281–232 (.548)	96–141 (.400)		
Total:		608–460 (.569)			
National champion Postseason invitational champion Conference regular season champion Conference regular season and conference tournament champion Division regular season champion Division regular season and conference tournament champion Conference tournament champion

== See also ==
- List of college women's basketball career coaching wins leaders
