= 2019–20 Mercer Bears women's basketball team =

Intercollegiate basketball season

2019–20 Mercer Bears women's basketball
- Conference: Southern Conference
- Record: 7–22 (4–10 SoCon)
- Head coach: Susie Gardner (10th season)
- Assistant coaches: Ben Wierzba; Kaitlyn Cresencia; Sydni Means
- Home arena: Hawkins Arena

2019–20 Southern Conference women's basketball standings
	Conf.				Overall
Team	W		L	PCT	W		L	PCT
UNC Greensboro	10	–	4	.714	21	–	8	.724
Samford†	10	–	4	.714	15	–	14	.517
Chattanooga	10	–	4	.714	11	–	17	.393
Furman	8	–	6	.571	12	–	11	.522
Wofford	8	–	6	.571	15	–	14	.517
East Tennessee State	4	–	10	.286	9	–	20	.310
Mercer	4	–	10	.286	7	–	22	.241
Western Carolina	2	–	12	.143	5	–	24	.172
† 2020 SoCon Tournament winner Rankings from AP poll

The 2019–20 Mercer Bears women's basketball team represented Mercer University during the 2019–20 NCAA Division I women's basketball season. The Bears, led by tenth-year head coach Susie Gardner, played their home games at the Hawkins Arena as members of the Southern Conference (SoCon). They finished the season 7–22; 4–10 in SoCon play to finish in a tie with East Tennessee State for sixth place.

== Roster ==
2019–20 Mercer Bears women's basketball team
Players
Coaches

Pos.	#	Name	Height	Year	Previous school	Hometown
G	0	Jill Harris	5 ft 9 in (1.75 m)	Fr	Crestview	Navarre, FL
G	1	Amoria Neal-Tysor	5 ft 6 in (1.68 m)	So	Lee County	Sanford, NC
G/F	4	Cierra Scott	5 ft 9 in (1.75 m)	So	Sacred Heart Academy	Louisville, KY
G	5	Emily Stradling	5 ft 10 in (1.78 m)	So	St David's Catholic College	Wales, England
G	11	Kiana Barkhoff	6 ft 3 in (1.91 m)	So	Palm Harbor University; Arizona	Kitzingen, Germany
F	13	PJ Wintermyer	6 ft 1 in (1.85 m)	Fr	Vero Beach	Vero Beach, FL
F	20	Sierra Votaw	6 ft 2 in (1.88 m)	So	Harrells Christian	Harrells, NC
G/F	21	Shannon Titus	5 ft 11 in (1.8 m)	Jr	Northview	Johns Creek, GA
G	23	Summer Pahl	5 ft 10 in (1.78 m)	So	St. Mary's	Kitchener, ON
F	32	Jaron Dougherty	6 ft 0 in (1.83 m)	Fr	Collins Hill	Buford, GA

Head coach

- Susie Gardner (Georgia)

Assistant coach(es)

- Ben Wierzba (SIU Edwardsville)
- Kaitlyn Cresencia (Connecticut College)
- Sydni Means (Mercer)

Legend

- (C) Team captain
- (S) Suspended
- (I) Ineligible
- (W) Walk-on
- Injured
- Current redshirt

Roster

== Schedule ==
Date time, TV	Rank^{#}	Opponent^{#}	Result	Record	Site (attendance) city, state
Non-conference regular season
November 5, 2019*; 7:00 p.m., ESPN3		LaGrange	W 74–47	1–0	Hawkins Arena (1,296); Macon, GA
November 8, 2019*; 4:30 p.m., ESPN3		Western Kentucky	L 62–75	1–1	Hawkins Arena (1,393); Macon, GA
November 13, 2019*; 7:00 p.m., ESPN+		at Kennesaw State	L 64–92	1–2	KSU Convocation Center (591); Kennesaw, GA
November 17, 2019*; 2:00 p.m., SEC Network		at Alabama	L 56–111	1–3	Coleman Coliseum (1,885); Tuscaloosa, AL
November 21, 2019*; 7:00 p.m., SEC Network		at Georgia	L 60-76	1–4	Stegeman Coliseum (2,230); Athens, GA
November 24, 2019*; 2:00 p.m., ESPN+		Eastern Kentucky	L 60–61 ^{OT}	1–5	Hawkins Arena (1,061); Macon, GA
November 29, 2019*; 6:30 p.m.		at Appalachian State	L 68–77	1–6	Holmes Convocation Center (236); Boone, NC
December 1, 2019*; 2:00 p.m.		at South Carolina State	W 66–55	2–6	SHM Memorial Center (215); Orangeburg, SC
December 7, 2019*; 2:00 p.m., ESPN+		Georgia Southern	W 62–52	3–6	Hawkins Arena (1,261); Macon, GA
December 15, 2019*; 2:00 p.m., ESPN+		Clemson	L 61–65	3–7	Hawkins Arena (1,484); Macon, GA
December 17, 2019*; 7:00 p.m., SEC Network		at Florida	L 50–71	3–8	O'Connell Center (1,017); Gainesville, FL
December 20, 2019*; 5:00 p.m., ESPN3		Gardner–Webb	L 62–65	3–9	Hawkins Arena (2,272); Macon, GA
December 29, 2019*; 2:00 p.m., ESPN+		Jacksonville	L 83–87 ^{OT}	3–10	Hawkins Arena (1,150); Macon, GA
January 2, 2020*; 7:00 p.m.		at Yale	L 60–68	3–11	Payne Whitney Gymnasium (256); New Haven, CT
January 4, 2020*; 2:00 p.m.		at Columbia	L 48–77	3–12	Levien Gymnasium (587); New York, NY
SoCon regular season
January 9, 2020; 7:00 p.m., ESPN+		at Furman	L 49–62	3–13 (0–1)	Timmons Arena (392); Greenville, SC
January 11, 2020; 2:00 p.m., ESPN3		at Wofford	L 49–77	3–14 (0–2)	Jerry Richardson Indoor Stadium (767); Spartanburg, SC
January 18, 2020; 5:30 p.m., ESPN3		at Samford	L 64–72	3–15 (0–3)	Pete Hanna Center (397); Homewood, AL
January 23, 2020; 7:00 p.m., ESPN3		East Tennessee State	L 66–72	3–16 (0–4)	Hawkins Arena (1,274); Mercer, GA
January 25, 2020; 2:00 p.m., ESPN3		Chattanooga	W 55–48	4–16 (1–4)	Hawkins Arena (1,427); Mercer, GA
January 30, 2020; 7:00 p.m., ESPN+		at UNC Greensboro	L 51–67	4–17 (1–5)	Fleming Gymnasium (475); Greensboro, NC
February 1, 2020; 2:00 p.m., ESPN3		at Western Carolina	L 40–51	4–18 (1–6)	Ramsey Center (342); Cullowhee, NC
February 6, 2020; 7:00 p.m., ESPN+		Wofford	W 54–53	5–18 (2–6)	Hawkins Arena (519); Macon, GA
February 8, 2020; 2:00 p.m., ESPN3		Furman	W 61–55	6–18 (3–6)	Hawkins Arena (2,172); Macon, GA
February 15, 2020; 2:00 p.m., ESPN3		Samford	L 54–60	6–19 (3–7)	Hawkins Arena (1,871); Macon, GA
February 20, 2020; 7:00 p.m., ESPN+		at Chattanooga	L 52–58	6–20 (3–8)	McKenzie Arena (1,494); Chattanooga, TN
February 22, 2020; 2:00 p.m., ESPN3		at East Tennessee State	L 54–56	6–21 (3–9)	Brooks Gymnasium (705); Johnson City, TN
February 27, 2020; 7:00 p.m., ESPN+		Western Carolina	W 60–54	7–21 (4–9)	Hawkins Arena (1,231); Mercer, GA
February 29, 2020; 2:00 p.m., ESPN+		UNC Greensboro	L 50–60	7–22 (4–10)	Hawkins Arena (2,197); Mercer, GA
SoCon tournament
March 5, 2020; 3:30 p.m., ESPN+	(7)	vs. (2) Chattanooga; Quarterfinals	W 66–55	8–22	U.S. Cellular Center; Asheville, NC
March 6, 2020; 1:15 p.m., ESPN+	(7)	vs. (3) UNC Greensboro; Semifinals	L 73–75 ^{OT}	8–23	U.S. Cellular Center; Asheville, NC
*Non-conference game. ^{#}Rankings from AP Poll. (#) Tournament seedings in parentheses. G=Greensboro Region. All times are in Eastern.

== Rankings ==
Regular-season polls
Poll	Pre- season	Week 2	Week 3	Week 4	Week 5	Week 6	Week 7	Week 8	Week 9	Week 10	Week 11	Week 12	Week 13	Week 14	Week 15	Week 16	Week 17	Week 18	Week 19	Final
AP																				N/A
Coaches		N/A																		

Legend
	Increase in ranking
	Decrease in ranking
	Not ranked previous week
(RV)	Received votes
(NR)	Not ranked
