= 2021 Southern Conference women's basketball tournament =

- Classification: Division I
- Season: 2020–21
- Teams: 8
- Site: Harrah's Cherokee Center; Asheville, North Carolina
- Champions: Mercer (3rd title)
- Winning coach: Susie Gardner (3rd title)
- MVP: Jaron Dougherty (Mercer)
- Television: Nexstar, ESPN+

2020–21 Southern Conference women's basketball standings
	Conf.				Overall
Team	W		L	PCT	W		L	PCT
Samford	11	–	2	.846	14	–	11	.560
Mercer†	10	–	3	.769	19	–	7	.731
Chattanooga	9	–	5	.643	14	–	10	.583
Wofford	7	–	7	.500	13	–	11	.542
Furman	6	–	8	.429	11	–	14	.440
UNC Greensboro	6	–	8	.429	8	–	16	.333
Western Carolina	3	–	10	.231	6	–	18	.250
East Tennessee State	1	–	10	.091	4	–	16	.200
† 2021 SoCon Tournament winner As of July 7, 2021; Rankings from AP poll

The 2021 Southern Conference women's basketball tournament was held March 4–7, 2021, at the Harrah's Cherokee Center in Asheville, North Carolina.

== Seeds ==
Teams are seeded by record within the conference, with a tiebreaker system to seed teams with identical conference records.

Seed	School	Conf	Overall	Tiebreaker
#1	Samford	11–2	14–8	
#2	Mercer	10–3	16–6	
#3	Chattanooga	9–5	14–9	
#4	Wofford	7–7	11–10	
#5	UNCG	6–8	8–15	2–0 vs. Furman
#6	Furman	6–8	10–13	0–2 vs. UNCG
#7	Western Carolina	3–10	6–17	
#8	ETSU	1–10	3–15	

== Schedule ==
All tournament games are streamed on ESPN+. The championship was televised across the region on select Nexstar stations and simulcast on ESPN+.

Session	Game	Time	Matchup	Television	Attendance
Quarterfinals – Thursday, March 4
1	1	Noon	No. 1 Samford 61 vs. No. 8 ETSU 68	ESPN+	
1	2	2:15 PM	No. 4 Wofford 78 vs. No. 5 UNCG 66	ESPN+	
2	3	5:00 PM	No. 2 Mercer 76 vs. No. 7 Western Carolina 67	ESPN+	
2	4	7:15 PM	No. 3 Chattanooga 40 vs. No. 6 Furman 58	ESPN+	
Semifinals – Friday, March 5
3	5	Noon	No. 8 ETSU 64 vs. No. 4 Wofford 75	ESPN+	
3	6	2:15 PM	No. 2 Mercer 81 vs. No. 6 Furman 71	ESPN+	
Championship Game – Sunday, March 7
4	7	Noon	No. 4 Wofford vs. No. 2 Mercer	Nexstar	
Game times in EST. Rankings denote tournament seeding.

== Bracket ==
- All times are Eastern.

Quarterfinals; Thursday, March 4, 2021; ESPN+
1	Samford	61
8	ETSU	68
4	Wofford	78
5	UNCG	66
2	Mercer	76
7	Western Carolina	67
3	Chattanooga	40
6	Furman	58

Semifinals; Friday, March 5, 2021; ESPN+
8	ETSU	64
4	Wofford	75
2	Mercer	81
6	Furman	71

Championship game Sunday, March 7, 2021; Nexstar
4	Wofford	38
2	Mercer	60

== See also ==
- 2021 Southern Conference men's basketball tournament
