= 2019–20 Chattanooga Mocs women's basketball team =

Intercollegiate basketball season

2019–20 Chattanooga Mocs women's basketball
- Conference: Southern Conference
- Record: 11–18 (10–4 SoCon)
- Head coach: Katie Burrows (2nd season)
- Assistant coaches: Debbie Black; Brittany Jonson; Jon Goldberg
- Home arena: McKenzie Arena

2019–20 Southern Conference women's basketball standings
	Conf.				Overall
Team	W		L	PCT	W		L	PCT
UNC Greensboro	10	–	4	.714	21	–	8	.724
Samford†	10	–	4	.714	15	–	14	.517
Chattanooga	10	–	4	.714	11	–	17	.393
Furman	8	–	6	.571	12	–	11	.522
Wofford	8	–	6	.571	15	–	14	.517
East Tennessee State	4	–	10	.286	9	–	20	.310
Mercer	4	–	10	.286	7	–	22	.241
Western Carolina	2	–	12	.143	5	–	24	.172
† 2020 SoCon Tournament winner Rankings from AP poll

The 2019–20 Chattanooga Mocs women's basketball team represented the University of Tennessee at Chattanooga during the 2019–20 NCAA Division I women's basketball season. The Mocs, led by first-year head coach Katie Burrows, played their home games at the McKenzie Arena as members of the Southern Conference (SoCon). The Mocs finished the season 11–18, 10–4 in third place in the SoCon, losing to Mercer in the first round of the conference tournament.

== Previous season ==
The 2018–19 Chattanooga Mocs women's basketball team represented the University of Tennessee at Chattanooga during the 2018–19 NCAA Division I women's basketball season. The Mocs, led by first-year head coach Katie Burrows, played their home games at the McKenzie Arena as members of the Southern Conference (SoCon). The Mocs finished the season 14–17, 8–6 in third place in the SoCon, losing to Furman in the quarterfinals of the conference tournament.

== Schedule ==
Date time, TV	Rank^{#}	Opponent^{#}	Result	Record	Site (attendance) city, state
Exhibition
October 29, 2019*; 7:00 pm		Lee	W 71-55		McKenzie Arena (1,574); Chattanooga, TN
Non-conference regular season
November 6, 2019*; 7:30 pm, ESPN+		at Belmont	L 50–63	0-1	Curb Event Center (922); Nashville, TN
November 9, 2019*; 2:00 pm		Hampton	L 55-84	0-2	McKenzie Arena; Chattanooga, TN
November 11, 2019*; 7:00 pm, ESPN+		at Liberty	W 75-54	1-2	Vines Center (1256); Lynchburg, VA
November 14, 2019*; 7:00 pm		Purdue	L 34-66	1-3	McKenzie Arena (1509); Chattanooga, TN
November 19, 2019*; 7:00 pm		at Cincinnati	L 53-72	1-4	Fifth Third Arena (966); Cincinnati, OH
November 21, 2019*; 6:30 pm, ACC Network		at No. 8 Louisville	L 37-86	1-5	KFC Yum! Center (7703); Louisville, KY
November 24, 2019*; 3:00 pm, ESPN3		at Austin Peay	L 49-50	1-6	Dunn Center (1417); Clarksville, TN
November 27, 2019*; 1:00 pm, ESPN+		Northern Colorado	L 42-59	1-7	McKenzie Arena (216); Chattanooga, TN
December 1, 2019*; 2:00 pm, ESPN+		at Eastern Kentucky	L 65-71	1-8	McBrayer Arena (475); Richmond, KY
December 8, 2019*; 3:00 pm, ESPN+		at UT Martin	L 79-81	1-9	Skyhawk Arena (924); Martin, TN
December 11, 2019*; 8:00 pm		at South Dakota State	L 56-71	1-10	Sanford Pentagon (1326); Sioux Falls, SD
December 15, 2019*; 1:30 pm, ESPN3		Troy	L 51-90	1-11	McKenzie Arena; Chattanooga, TN
December 19, 2019*; 6:30 pm, ACC Network		at NC State	L 38-74	1-12	PNC Arena (2633); Raleigh, NC
December 29, 2019*; 4:00 pm, ESPN+		Ohio	L 58-70	1-13	McKenzie Arena (1355); Chattanooga, TN
SoCon Regular Season
January 9, 2020; 7:00 pm, ESPN3		at Western Carolina	W 59-52	2-13 (1–0)	Ramsey Center (215); Cullhowee, NC
January 11, 2020; 4:00 pm, ESPN3		at UNC Greensboro	L 41-49	2-14 (1-1)	McKenzie Arena (217); Chattanooga, TN
January 16, 2020; 7:00 pm, ESPN3		Wofford	W 80-76	3-14 (2-1)	McKenzie Arena (1392); Chattanooga, TN
January 18, 2020; 2:00 pm, ESPN3		Furman	W 60-52	4-14 (3-1)	McKenzie Arena (1556); Chattanooga, TN
January 23, 2020; 7:00 pm, ESPN+		at Samford	L 46-60	4–15 (3-2)	Pete Hanna Center (251); Homewood, AL
January 25, 2020; 2:00 pm, ESPN3		at Mercer	L 48-55	4-16 (3-3)	Hawkins Arena (1427); Macon, GA
February 1, 2020; 1:00 pm		at East Tennessee State	W 91-82 ^{3OT}	5-16 (4-3)	Freedom Hall Civic Center (978); Johnson City, TN
February 6, 2020; 7:00 pm, ESPN+		UNC Greensboro	W 79-59	6-16 (5-3)	McKenzie Arena (1383); Chattanooga, TN
February 8, 2020; 2:00 pm, ESPN3		Western Carolina	L 53-61	6–17 (5-4)	McKenzie Arena (1529); Chattanooga, TN
February 13, 2020; 7:00 pm, ESPN+		at Furman	W 69-63	7-17 (6–4)	Timmons Arena (212); Greenville, SC
February 15, 2020; 2:00 pm, ESPN3		at Wofford	W 51-49	8-17 (7-4)	Jerry Richardson Indoor Stadium (1124); Spartanburg, SC
February 20, 2020; 7:00 pm, ESPN+		Mercer	W 58–52	9-17 (8-4)	McKenzie Arena (1494); Chattanooga, TN
February 22, 2020; 2:00 pm, ESPN3		Samford	W 64-58	10-17 (9-4)	McKenzie Arena (1464); Chattanooga, TN
February 29, 2020; 2:00 pm, ESPN3		ETSU	W 69-65	11-17 (10-4)	McKenzie Arena; Chattanooga, TN
SoCon Tournament
March 5, 2020; 3:30 pm, ESPN+	(2)	vs. (7) Mercer; First Round	L 55-63	11-18	U.S. Cellular Center; Asheville, NC
*Non-conference game. ^{#}Rankings from AP Poll. (#) Tournament seedings in parentheses. All times are in Eastern Time.
