= Chattanooga High School =

Coordinates: 35.0794°N 85.3036°W

Chattanooga High School was founded in the fall of 1874 in Chattanooga, Hamilton County, Tennessee, United States. Sometimes called City High School, it has evolved into two high schools: the Chattanooga High School Center for Creative Arts and the Chattanooga School for the Arts & Sciences.

== History ==
City High on 3rd street ceased to exist after the 1962–1963 school year, when the school moved to its new site on Dallas Road. That building became Riverside High School that same year and remained so until 1983. The Erlanger School of Nursing occupied the building for two years, 1983–1985. After some major renovation, CSAS opened in the fall of 1986 as a middle school. Grades were added each year until its first graduating class in 1991. Since that time, it has been a K-12 school.

As for the building in North Chattanooga opening in 1963, it remained Chattanooga High School for many years but eventually, during the 1990s, the school became known as Chattanooga High School – Phoenix 3 (Normal Park and Northside were Phoenix 1 and 2). Also in the 1990s, a "school within a school" was formed by creating a magnet program for music, theater, dance, and musical theater. After a few years of being a zoned magnet, CHS became a true magnet around 1999 and programs expanded to include the creative arts, rather than just the performing arts. The school now houses around 550 students in grades 6–12. The official name is now, and has been since the creative arts inception, Chattanooga High School – Center for Creative Arts.

== Notable alumni ==
- William E. Bishop (1932—2003), politician who served as mayor of Rockaway Township, New Jersey and represented the 25th Legislative District in the New Jersey General Assembly 1982–1984
- Tony Brown – former defensive tackle for the University of Memphis, 10-year NFL veteran, made Pro Bowl in 2006/2007
- Dale Clevenger – principal French horn for Chicago Symphony
- Charles H. Coolidge, Class of 1939 – U.S. Army Medal of Honor recipient, World War II
- Bob Corker – United States senator, Tennessee (Republican)
- Sharon Fanning – basketball coach
