= 2018–19 Chattanooga Mocs women's basketball team =

Intercollegiate basketball season

2018–19 Chattanooga Mocs women's basketball
- Conference: Southern Conference
- Record: 14–17 (8–6 SoCon)
- Head coach: Katie Burrows (1st season)
- Assistant coaches: Debbie Black; Brittany Jonson; Jon Goldberg
- Home arena: McKenzie Arena

2018–19 Southern Conference women's basketball standings
	Conf.				Overall
Team	W		L	PCT	W		L	PCT
Mercer †	14	–	0	1.000	25	–	8	.758
Furman	9	–	5	.643	19	–	14	.576
Chattanooga	8	–	6	.571	14	–	17	.452
East Tennessee State	8	–	6	.571	10	–	21	.323
Wofford	7	–	7	.500	16	–	15	.516
UNC Greensboro	5	–	9	.357	11	–	19	.367
Samford	5	–	9	.357	10	–	20	.333
Western Carolina	0	–	14	.000	4	–	26	.133
† 2019 SoCon Tournament winner

The 2018–19 Chattanooga Mocs women's basketball team represented the University of Tennessee at Chattanooga during the 2018–19 NCAA Division I women's basketball season. The Mocs, led by first-year head coach Katie Burrows, played their home games at the McKenzie Arena as members of the Southern Conference (SoCon). The Mocs finished the season 14–17, 8–6 in third place in the SoCon, losing to Furman in the quarterfinals of the conference tournament.

== Previous season ==
The 2017–18 Chattanooga Mocs women's basketball team represented the University of Tennessee at Chattanooga during the 2017–18 NCAA Division I women's basketball season. The Mocs, led by fifth-year head coach Jim Foster, played their home games at the McKenzie Arena as members of the Southern Conference (SoCon). The Mocs finished the season 17–13, 8–6 in third place in the SoCon, losing to UNC Greensboro in the conference tournament. They received an at-large berth in the 2018 WNIT but lost in the first round to UAB. Foster retired soon afterwards.

== Roster ==
2018–19 Chattanooga Mocs women's basketball team
Players
Coaches

Pos.	#	Name	Height	Year	Hometown
G	00	Liz Wood	5 ft 4 in (1.63 m)	So	Paris, TN
G	3	Mya Long	5 ft 9 in (1.75 m)	So	Chattanooga, TN
F	4	Arianne Whitaker (redshirt)	6 ft 2 in (1.88 m)	Jr	Cincinnati, OH
F	5	Eboni Williams	6 ft 0 in (1.83 m)	Fr	Hoover, AL
G	10	Pareunuora Pene	5 ft 7 in (1.7 m)	Fr	Rotorua, NZ
G	12	Bria Dial	6 ft 0 in (1.83 m)	So	Murfreesboro, TN
G	13	Morgan Hill	5 ft 10 in (1.78 m)	Fr	Minneapolis, MN
G	14	Molly Melton	5 ft 4 in (1.63 m)	Sr	Knoxville, TN
G/F	22	Shelby Davenport (redshirt)	6 ft 0 in (1.83 m)	Sr	Murfreesboro, TN
G	23	Brooke Burns	5 ft 10 in (1.78 m)	So	Gadsden, AL
G	24	Nakeia Burks (redshirt)	5 ft 10 in (1.78 m)	Jr	Huntsville, AL
F	25	Abby Cornelius	6 ft 2 in (1.88 m)	Fr	Knoxville, TN
F	32	Rochelle Lee (redshirt)	6 ft 4 in (1.93 m)	So	Memphis, TN
G	33	Laklyn Bouldin	5 ft 9 in (1.75 m)	Jr	Spencer, TN

Head coach

- Katie Burrows (Chattanooga)

Assistant coach(es)

- Brittany Johnson (Ohio State)
- Jonathon Goldberg (Emerson)
- Debbie Black (Saint Joseph's)

Legend

- (C) Team captain
- (S) Suspended
- (I) Ineligible
- (W) Walk-on
- Injured
- Current redshirt

Roster
Last update: November 22, 2024

== Schedule ==
Date time, TV	Rank^{#}	Opponent^{#}	Result	Record	Site (attendance) city, state
Regular Season
November 6, 2018*; 7:00 pm		Lee	W 65–55	1–0	McKenzie Arena (1,453); Chattanooga, TN
November 9, 2018*; 7:00 pm		No. 4 Louisville	L 49–75	1–1	McKenzie Arena (1,802); Chattanooga, TN
November 16, 2018*; 7:00 pm, ESPN+		at Hampton	W 58–50	2–1	Hampton Convocation Center (3,432); Hampton, VA
November 19, 2018*; 7:00 pm, ACC Network		at Virginia Tech	L 59–74	2–2	Cassell Coliseum (966); Blacksburg, VA
November 21, 2018*; 7:00 pm, ESPN+		at Liberty	W 75–60	3–2	McKenzie Arena (1,255); Chattanooga, TN
November 24, 2018*; 4:30 pm		vs. Saint Louis; Cavalier Classic	W 71–61	4–2	John Paul Jones Arena (2,589); Charlottesville, VA
November 25, 2018*; 1:00 pm		vs. Central Michigan; Cavalier Classic	L 50–73	4–3	John Paul Jones Arena (216); Charlottesville, VA
November 28, 2018*; 7:00 pm, ESPN+		UT Martin	L 79–81	4–4	McKenzie Arena (1,355); Chattanooga, TN
November 30, 2018*; 5:00 pm		at UCF	L 37–75	4–5	CFE Arena (2,774); Orlando, FL
December 4, 2018*; 7:00 pm, ESPN+		South Dakota State	L 54–71	4–6	McKenzie Arena (1,279); Chattanooga, TN
December 13, 2018*; 9:00 pm, Pluto TV		at Northern Colorado	L 65–68 ^{OT}	4–7	Bank of Colorado Arena (1,457); Greeley, CO
December 17, 2018*; 7:00 pm, ESPN3		Belmont	L 51–67	4–8	McKenzie Arena (1,367); Chattanooga, TN
December 21, 2018*; 7:00 pm, ESPN+		NC State	L 58–78	4–9	McKenzie Arena (1,714); Chattanooga, TN
December 29, 2018*; 3:00 pm		vs. Middle Tennessee; Fordham Classic	L 47–58	4–10	Rose Hill Gymnasium (1,069); Bronx, NY
December 30, 2018*; 1:00 pm		vs. Maine; Fordham Classic	W 66–61	5–10	Rose Hill Gymnasium; Bronx, NY
SoCon Regular Season
January 12, 2019; 2:00 pm, ESPN3		East Tennessee State	W 76–67	6–10 (1–0)	McKenzie Arena; Chattanooga, TN
January 17, 2019; 5:30 pm, ESPN3		Wofford	W 89–82	7–10 (2–0)	McKenzie Arena; Chattanooga, TN
January 19, 2019; 2:00 pm, ESPN3		at Furman	W 73–53	8–10 (3–0)	McKenzie Arena; Chattanooga, TN
January 24, 2019; 5:00 pm, ESPN+		Mercer	L 58–65	8–11 (3–1)	Hawkins Arena (1,891); Macon, GA
January 26, 2019; 3:00 pm, ESPN3		Samford	W 73–63	9–11 (4–1)	Pete Hanna Center (325); Homewood, AL
January 31, 2019; 5:30 pm, ESPN+		Western Carolina	W 72–58	10–11 (5–1)	McKenzie Arena; Chattanooga, TN
February 2, 2019; 2:00 pm, ESPN3		UNC Greensboro	W 73–57	11–11 (6–1)	McKenzie Arena (423); Chattanooga, TN
February 9, 2019; 2:00 pm, ESPN3		East Tennessee State	L 54–64	11–12 (6–2)	Freedom Hall Civic Center (1,068); Johnson City, TN
February 14, 2019; 5:00 pm, ESPN+		Furman	L 54–61	11–13 (6–3)	Timmons Arena (563); Greenville, SC
February 16, 2019; 2:00 pm, ESPN+		Wofford	L 60–64	11–14 (6–4)	Jerry Richardson Indoor Stadium (212); Spartanburg, SC
February 21, 2019; 7:00 pm, ESPN+		Samford	W 61–56	12–14 (7–4)	McKenzie Arena (1,464); Chattanooga, TN
February 23, 2019; 2:00 pm, ESPN3		Mercer	L 56–62	12–15 (7–5)	McKenzie Arena (1,528); Chattanooga, TN
February 28, 2019; 7:00 pm, ESPN+		at UNC Greensboro	L 49–53	12–16 (7–6)	Greensboro Coliseum (427); Greensboro, NC
March 2, 2019; 2:00 pm, ESPN3		at Western Carolina	W 65–50	13–16 (8–6)	Ramsey Center (322); Cullowhee, NC
SoCon Tournament
March 7, 2019; 5:45 pm, ESPN+	(3)	vs. (6) UNC Greensboro; Quarterfinals	W 72–62	14–16	U.S. Cellular Center (4,126); Asheville, NC
March 8, 2019; 1:15 pm, ESPN+	(3)	vs. (2) Furman; Semifinals	L 67–73	14–17	U.S. Cellular Center (2,869); Asheville, NC
*Non-conference game. ^{#}Rankings from AP Poll. (#) Tournament seedings in parentheses. All times are in Eastern Time.
