= 2018–19 Mercer Bears women's basketball team =

Intercollegiate basketball season

2018–19 Mercer Bears women's basketball

SoCon Regular Season and Tournament Champions

NCAA tournament, first round
- Conference: Southern Conference
- Record: 25–8 (14–0 SoCon)
- Head coach: Susie Gardner (9th season)
- Assistant coaches: Ben Wierzba; Kaitlyn Cresencia; Sydni Means
- Home arena: Hawkins Arena

2018–19 Southern Conference women's basketball standings
	Conf.				Overall
Team	W		L	PCT	W		L	PCT
Mercer †	14	–	0	1.000	25	–	8	.758
Furman	9	–	5	.643	19	–	14	.576
Chattanooga	8	–	6	.571	14	–	17	.452
East Tennessee State	8	–	6	.571	10	–	21	.323
Wofford	7	–	7	.500	16	–	15	.516
UNC Greensboro	5	–	9	.357	11	–	19	.367
Samford	5	–	9	.357	10	–	20	.333
Western Carolina	0	–	14	.000	4	–	26	.133
† 2019 SoCon Tournament winner

The 2018–19 Mercer Bears women's basketball team represented Mercer University during the 2018–19 NCAA Division I women's basketball season. The Bears, led by ninth-year head coach Susie Gardner, played their home games at the Hawkins Arena as members of the Southern Conference (SoCon). They finished the season 25–3, 16–0 in Southern Conference play to win the Southern Conference regular season. They won the SoCon women's tournament to earn an automatic trip to the NCAA women's tournament, where they lost to Iowa in the first round.

== Roster ==
2018–19 Mercer Bears women's basketball team
Players
Coaches

Pos.	#	Name	Height	Year	Previous school	Hometown
G	0	Keke Calloway	5 ft 9 in (1.75 m)	Sr	Mary Persons	Forsyth, GA
G	1	Amoria Neal-Tysor	5 ft 6 in (1.68 m)	Fr	Lee County	Sanford, NC
G/F	2	Amanda Thompson	5 ft 10 in (1.78 m)	Sr	Hayesville	Nayesville, NC
G/F	4	Cierra Scott	5 ft 9 in (1.75 m)	Fr	Sacred Heart Academy	Louisville, KY
G	5	Emily Stradling	5 ft 10 in (1.78 m)	Fr	St David's Catholic College	Wales, England
G	11	Linnea Rosendal	6 ft 1 in (1.85 m)	Sr		Stockholm, Sweden
G	12	Tia Benvenuti	5 ft 9 in (1.75 m)	Fr	South Lakes	Reston, VA
F	15	Ally Welch	5 ft 11 in (1.8 m)	So	South Forsyth	Cumming, GA
G/F	21	Shannon Titus	5 ft 11 in (1.8 m)	So	Northview	Johns Creek, GA
C	22	Lakaitlin Wright	6 ft 3 in (1.91 m)	So	Wheeler County	Alamo, GA
G	23	Summer Pahl	5 ft 10 in (1.78 m)	Fr	St. Mary's	Kitchener, ON
F	32	Jaron Dougherty	6 ft 0 in (1.83 m)	Fr	Collins Hill	Buford, GA
C	34	Rachel Selph	6 ft 3 in (1.91 m)	Sr	Dodge County	Eastman, GA
G		Kiana Barkhoff	6 ft 3 in (1.91 m)	So	Palm Harbor University; Arizona	Kitzingen, Germany

Head coach

- Susie Gardner (Georgia)

Assistant coach(es)

- Ben Wierzba (SIU Edwardsville)
- Kaitlyn Cresencia (Connecticut College)
- Sydni Means (Mercer)

Legend

- (C) Team captain
- (S) Suspended
- (I) Ineligible
- (W) Walk-on
- Injured
- Current redshirt

Roster

== Schedule ==
Date time, TV	Rank^{#}	Opponent^{#}	Result	Record	Site (attendance) city, state
Non-conference regular season
Nov 9, 2018*; 7:00 pm		at Wake Forest	L 54–69	0–1	LJVM Coliseum (312); Winston–Salem, NC
Nov 12, 2018*; 6:30 pm		at Georgia Southern	W 79–72	1–1	Hanner Fieldhouse (252); Statesboro, GA
Nov 15, 2018*; 7:00 pm, ESPN+		Florida	W 92–82	2–1	Hawkins Arena (2,038); Macon, GA
Nov 18, 2018*; 2:00 pm, ESPN+		UCF	L 42–76	2–2	Hawkins Arena (446); Macon, GA
Nov 23, 2018*; 4:00 pm		vs. Memphis; Coastal Carolina Thanksgiving Classic	L 53–59	2–3	HTC Center (247); Conway, SC
Nov 25, 2018*; 11:30 am		vs. Bowling Green; Coastal Carolina Thanksgiving Classic	W 76–63	3–3	HTC Center (106); Conway, SC
Nov 28, 2018*; 7:00 pm, SECN+		at Georgia	L 60–67	3–4	Stegeman Coliseum (2,117); Athens, GA
Dec 1, 2018*; 2:00 pm, ESPN+		Kennesaw State	W 64–48	4–4	Hawkins Arena (565); Macon, GA
Dec 5, 2018*; 7:00 pm, ESPN+		Florida State	L 56–57	4–5	Hawkins Arena (1,072); Macon, GA
Dec 8, 2018*; 1:00 pm, ESPN3		Charlotte	W 57–40	5–5	Hawkins Arena (827); Macon, GA
Dec 18, 2018*; 7:00 pm, YouTube		at Howard	W 85–70	6–5	Burr Gymnasium (576); Washington, D.C.
Dec 21, 2018*; 12:00 pm, ESPN+		at George Washington	W 61–53	7–5	Charles E. Smith Center (714); Washington, D.C.
Dec 30, 2018*; 2:00 pm, ESPN+		UNC Asheville	W 61–47	8–5	Hawkins Arena (478); Macon, GA
Jan 2, 2019*; 2:00 pm, ESPN+		at Jacksonville	L 66–71	8–6	Swisher Gymnasium (445); Jacksonville, FL
Jan 6, 2019*; 2:00 pm, ESPN+		Columbia	L 68–72	8–7	Hawkins Arena (565); Macon, GA
SoCon regular season
Jan 12, 2019; 2:00 pm, ESPN+		Samford	W 76–68 ^{OT}	9–7 (1–0)	Hawkins Arena (2,277); Macon, GA
Jan 17, 2019; 5:00 pm, ESPN3		at Western Carolina	W 69–67	10–7 (2–0)	Ramsey Center (741); Cullowhee, NC
Jan 19, 2019; 4:00 pm, ESPN+		at UNC Greensboro	W 71–58	11–7 (3–0)	Fleming Gymnasium (529); Greensboro, NC
Jan 24, 2019; 5:00 pm, ESPN+		Chattanooga	W 65–58	12–7 (4–0)	Hawkins Arena (1,891); Mercer, GA
Jan 26, 2019; 2:00 pm, ESPN+		East Tennessee State	W 64–41	13–7 (5–0)	Hawkins Arena (2,027); Mercer, GA
Jan 31, 2019; 6:00 pm, ESPN3		at Wofford	W 87–79	14–7 (6–0)	Jerry Richardson Indoor Stadium (412); Spartanburg, SC
Feb 2, 2019; 2:00 pm, ESPN3		at Furman	W 75–60	15–7 (7–0)	Timmons Arena (407); Greenville, SC
Feb 9, 2019; 3:00 pm, ESPN3		at Samford	W 68–52	16–7 (8–0)	Pete Hanna Center (278); Birmingham, AL
Feb 14, 2019; 7:00 pm, ESPN+		UNC Greensboro	W 85–73	17–7 (9–0)	Hawkins Arena (1,073); Macon, GA
Feb 16, 2019; 2:00 pm, ESPN+		Western Carolina	W 71–55	18–7 (10–0)	Hawkins Arena (876); Macon, GA
Feb 21, 2019; 7:00 pm, ESPN3		at East Tennessee State	W 83–77 ^{OT}	19–7 (11–0)	J. Madison Brooks Gymnasium (703); Johnson City, TN
Feb 23, 2019; 2:00 pm, ESPN3		at Chattanooga	W 62–58	20–7 (12–0)	McKenzie Arena (1,528); Chattanooga, TN
Feb 28, 2019; 7:00 pm, ESPN+		Furman	W 66–62	21–7 (13–0)	Hawkins Arena (1,234); Mercer, GA
Mar 2, 2019; 2:00 pm, ESPN+		Wofford	W 65–59	22–7 (14–0)	Hawkins Arena (1,347); Mercer, GA
SoCon Tournament
Mar 7, 2019; 11:00 am, ESPN+	(1)	vs. (8) Western Carolina; Quarterfinals	W 55–32	23–7	U.S. Cellular Center; Asheville, NC
Mar 8, 2019; 11:00 am, ESPN+	(1)	vs. (5) Wofford; Semifinals	W 69–51	24–7	U.S. Cellular Center; Asheville, NC
Mar 10, 2019; 12:00 pm, Nexstar/ESPN+	(1)	vs. (2) Furman; Championship Game	W 66–63	25–7	U.S. Cellular Center (1,280); Asheville, NC
NCAA Women's Tournament
Mar 22, 2019*; 2:00 pm, ESPN2	(15 G)	at (2 G) No. 8 Iowa; First Round	L 61–66	25–8	Carver–Hawkeye Arena (10,720); Iowa City, IA
*Non-conference game. ^{#}Rankings from AP Poll. (#) Tournament seedings in parentheses. G=Greensboro Region. All times are in Eastern Time.

== Rankings ==
Regular season polls
Poll	Pre- season	Week 2	Week 3	Week 4	Week 5	Week 6	Week 7	Week 8	Week 9	Week 10	Week 11	Week 12	Week 13	Week 14	Week 15	Week 16	Week 17	Week 18	Week 19	Final
AP																				N/A
Coaches		N/A																		

Legend
	Increase in ranking
	Decrease in ranking
	Not ranked previous week
(RV)	Received votes
(NR)	Not ranked
