= 2020 Southern Conference women's basketball tournament =

College basketball tournament

- Classification: Division I
- Season: 2019–20
- Teams: 8
- Site: Harrah's Cherokee Center; Asheville, North Carolina
- Champions: Samford (3rd title)
- Winning coach: Carley Kuhns (1st title)
- Television: Nexstar, ESPN+

2019–20 Southern Conference women's basketball standings
	Conf.				Overall
Team	W		L	PCT	W		L	PCT
UNC Greensboro	10	–	4	.714	21	–	8	.724
Samford†	10	–	4	.714	15	–	14	.517
Chattanooga	10	–	4	.714	11	–	17	.393
Furman	8	–	6	.571	12	–	11	.522
Wofford	8	–	6	.571	15	–	14	.517
East Tennessee State	4	–	10	.286	9	–	20	.310
Mercer	4	–	10	.286	7	–	22	.241
Western Carolina	2	–	12	.143	5	–	24	.172
† 2020 SoCon Tournament winner As of March 12, 2025; Rankings from AP poll

The 2020 Southern Conference women's basketball tournament was held between March 5–8, 2020, at the Harrah's Cherokee Center in Asheville, North Carolina. Samford won the tournament and received an automatic bid to the 2020 NCAA Tournament.

== Seeds ==
Teams are seeded by record within the conference, with a tiebreaker system to seed teams with identical conference records.

Seed	School	Conf	Overall
#1	Samford	10-4	16-14
#2	Chattanooga	10-4	11-17
#3	UNC-Greensboro	10-4	21-8
#4	Furman	8–6	18-11
#5	Wofford	8-6	15-14
#6	ETSU	4-10	9-20
#7	Mercer	4-10	7-22
#8	Western Carolina	2-12	5-25

== Schedule ==
All tournament games are streamed on ESPN+. The championship was televised across the region on select Nexstar stations and simulcast on ESPN+.

Session	Game	Time*	Matchup^{#}	Television	Attendance
Quarterfinals – Thursday, March 5
1	1	11 AM	#1 Samford 77 vs. #8 Western Carolina 62	ESPN+	
1	2	1:15 PM	#4 Furman 68 vs. #5 Wofford 54	ESPN+	
2	3	3:30 PM	#2 Chattanooga 55 vs. #7 Mercer 63	ESPN+	
2	4	5:45 PM	#3 UNC Greensboro 57 vs. #6 ETSU 47	ESPN+	
Semifinals – Friday, March 6
3	5	11 AM	#1 Samford 75 vs. #4 Furman 45	ESPN+	
3	6	1:15 PM	#7 Mercer 73 vs. #3 UNCG 75	ESPN+	
Championship Game – Sunday, March 8
4	7	Noon	#1 Samford 59 vs. #3 UNC Greensboro 54	Nexstar	
*Game Times in EST. #-Rankings denote tournament seeding.

== Bracket ==
- All times are Eastern.

Quarterfinals; Thursday, March 5, 2020; ESPN+
1	Samford	77
8	Western Carolina	62
4	Furman	68
5	Wofford	54
2	Chattanooga	55
7	Mercer	63
3	UNC Greensboro	57
6	ETSU	47

Semifinals; Friday, March 6, 2020; ESPN+
1	Samford	75
4	Furman	45
7	Mercer	73
3	UNC Greensboro	75

Championship game Sunday, March 8, 2020; Nexstar
1	Samford	59
3	UNC Greensboro	54

== See also ==
- 2020 Southern Conference men's basketball tournament
