= Georgia Southern Eagles women's basketball =

College basketball team

Georgia Southern Eagles
2026–27 Georgia Southern Eagles women's basketball team
- University: Georgia Southern University
- Head coach: Heather Macy (1st season)
- Location: Statesboro, Georgia
- Arena: Hill Convocation Center (capacity: 5,500)
- Conference: Sun Belt
- Nickname: Eagles
- Colors: Blue and white

NCAA Division I tournament appearances
- 1993, 1994

AIAW tournament appearances
- 1982

Conference tournament champions
- ASUN: 1987, 1988, 1990; SoCon: 1993, 1994

Conference regular-season champions
- ASUN: 1987, 1988, 1990; SoCon: 1994, 1998, 2001; Sun Belt: 2026

The Georgia Southern Eagles women's basketball team is the basketball team that represents Georgia Southern University in Statesboro, Georgia, United States. The school's team currently competes in the Sun Belt Conference and holds matches at Hill Convocation Center.

== History ==
The Eagles joined the New South Women's Athletic Conference (which later rebranded as the Atlantic Sun Conference) in 1985. They made the conference tournament championship game five straight years from 1986 to 1990, winning three times, although they did not receive an auto bid to the NCAA Division I tournament. They joined the Southern Conference in 1992. They reached the Southern Conference women's basketball tournament championship game six times, winning twice in 1993 and 1994. They joined the Sun Belt Conference in 2014.

Georgia Southern made it to the NCAA tournament in 1993 and 1994, losing in the First Round to Alabama 102-70 and 101–53 to North Carolina, respectively. As of the end of the 2015–16 season, the Eagles have an all-time record of 642–573.

== Postseason results ==
=== NCAA Division I ===
The Eagles made two appearances in the NCAA Division I women's basketball tournament, with a combined record of 0–2.

Year	Seed	Round	Opponent	Result
1993	#12	First Round	#5 Alabama	L 70–102
1994	#14	First Round	#3 North Carolina	L 53–101

=== AIAW Division I ===
The Eagles made one appearance in the AIAW National Division I basketball tournament, with a record of 0–1.

Year	Round	Opponent	Result
1982	First Round	Rutgers	L 69–79
