= 2019 Southern Conference women's basketball tournament =

- Classification: Division I
- Season: 2018–19
- Teams: 8
- Site: U.S. Cellular Center; Asheville, North Carolina
- Champions: Mercer (2nd title)
- Winning coach: Susie Gardner (2nd title)
- MVP: KeKe Calloway (Mercer)
- Attendance: 8,275
- Television: ESPN+

2018–19 Southern Conference women's basketball standings
	Conf.				Overall
Team	W		L	PCT	W		L	PCT
Mercer †	14	–	0	1.000	25	–	8	.758
Furman	9	–	5	.643	19	–	14	.576
Chattanooga	8	–	6	.571	14	–	17	.452
East Tennessee State	8	–	6	.571	10	–	21	.323
Wofford	7	–	7	.500	16	–	15	.516
UNC Greensboro	5	–	9	.357	11	–	19	.367
Samford	5	–	9	.357	10	–	20	.333
Western Carolina	0	–	14	.000	4	–	26	.133
† 2019 SoCon Tournament winner

The 2019 Southern Conference women's basketball tournament was held between March 7 and 10 in Asheville, North Carolina, at the U.S. Cellular Center. Mercer defeated Furman 66–63 to earn their second consecutive trip to the NCAA Tournament.

== Seeds ==
Teams are seeded by record within the conference, with a tiebreaker system to seed teams with identical conference records.

Seed	School	Conf	Overall
#1	Mercer	14–0	24–7
#2	Furman	9–5	19–12
#3	Chattanooga	8–6	14–17
#4	East Tennessee State	8–6	10–21
#5	Wofford	7–7	16–15
#6	UNCG	5–9	11–19
#7	Samford	5–9	10–20
#8	Western Carolina	0–14	4–26

== Schedule ==
All tournament games are streamed on ESPN+. The championship was televised across the region on select Nexstar stations and simulcast on ESPN+.

Session	Game	Time*	Matchup^{#}	Television	Attendance
Quarterfinals – Thursday, March 7
1	1	11 AM	#1 Mercer vs. #8 Western Carolina	ESPN+	4,126
1	2	1:15 PM	#4 ETSU vs. #5 Wofford	ESPN+	4,126
2	3	3:30 PM	#2 Furman vs. #7 Samford	ESPN+	4,126
2	4	5:45 PM	#3 Chattanooga vs. #6 UNCG	ESPN+	4,126
Semifinals – Friday, March 8
3	5	3:30 PM	#1 Mercer vs. #5 Wofford	ESPN+	2,869
3	6	1:15 PM	#2 Furman vs. #3 Chattanooga	ESPN+	2,869
Championship Game – Sunday, March 10
4	7	Noon	#1 Mercer vs. #2 Furman	ESPN+	1,280
*Game Times in EST. #-Rankings denote tournament seeding.

== Bracket ==
- All times are Eastern.

Quarterfinals; Thursday, March 7, 2019; ESPN+
1	Mercer	55
8	Western Carolina	32
4	ETSU	66
5	Wofford	75
2	Furman	67
7	Samford	52
3	Chattanooga	72
6	UNCG	62

Semifinals; Friday, March 8, 2019; ESPN+
1	Mercer	69
5	Wofford	51
2	Furman	73
3	Chattanooga	66

Championship game Sunday, March 10, 2019; ESPN+
1	Mercer	66
2	Furman	63

== All-Tournament teams ==
=== First team ===
- Tierra Hodges, Furman
- Taylor Petty, Furman
- KeKe Calloway, Mercer
- Amanda Thompson, Mercer
- Shannon Titus, Mercer
- Jasmine Joyner, Chattanooga

=== Second team ===
- Lakelyn Bouldin, Chattanooga
- Da'Ja Green, Wofford
- Le’Jzae Davidson, Furman
- Celena Taborn, Furman
- Rachel Selph, Mercer

=== Most Outstanding Player ===
- KeKe Calloway, Mercer

== See also ==
- 2019 Southern Conference men's basketball tournament
