= 2025–26 Samford Bulldogs women's basketball team =

2025–26 Samford Bulldogs women's basketball

SoCon tournament champions

NCAA tournament, First Four
- Conference: Southern Conference
- Record: 16–19 (6–8 SoCon)
- Head coach: Matt Wise (1st season)
- Assistant coaches: Hannah Barber; Charity Brown; Sally Higgins; Walker Martin
- Home arena: Pete Hanna Center

2025–26 Southern Conference women's basketball standings
	Conf.				Overall
Team	W		L	PCT	W		L	PCT
Chattanooga	10	–	4	.714	20	–	11	.645
East Tennessee State	10	–	4	.714	18	–	13	.581
Wofford	10	–	4	.714	16	–	13	.552
Furman	9	–	5	.643	18	–	13	.581
Mercer	7	–	7	.500	17	–	13	.567
Samford †	6	–	8	.429	16	–	19	.457
UNC Greensboro	4	–	10	.286	14	–	16	.467
Western Carolina	0	–	14	.000	3	–	26	.103
† 2026 SoCon tournament winner

The 2025–26 Samford Bulldogs women's basketball team represented Samford University during the 2025–26 NCAA Division I women's basketball season. The Bulldogs, who are led by first-year head coach Matt Wise, played their home games at the Pete Hanna Center in Homewood, Alabama as members of the Southern Conference (SoCon).

== Previous season ==
The Bulldogs finished the 2024–25 season 12–19, 7–7 in SoCon play, to finish in fifth place. They were defeated by Wofford in the quarterfinals of the SoCon tournament.

== Preseason ==
On October 3, 2025, the SoCon released their preseason coaches poll. Samford was picked to finish for sixth in the SoCon regular season.

=== Preseason rankings ===
SoCon preseason poll
Predicted finish	Team	Votes (1st place)
1	Chattanooga	48 (6)
2	UNC Greensboro	39 (2)
3	East Tennessee State	38
4	Wofford	28
5	Furman	26
6	Samford	19
7	Western Carolina	14
8	Mercer	12

=== Preseason All-SoCon Team ===
Preseason All-SoCon Team
Player	Position	Year
Emily Bowman	Center	RS-Senior

== Roster ==
2025–26 Samford Bulldogs women's basketball team
Players
Coaches

Pos.	#	Name	Height	Year	Previous school	Hometown
G	1	Jada Knight	5 ft 7 in (1.7 m)	GS	Butler Community College	Hoover, Alabama
G	2	Avary Brewer	5 ft 7 in (1.7 m)	Fr	Bradley Central High School	Cleveland, Tennessee
G	3	Kaylee Yarbrough	5 ft 9 in (1.75 m)	Fr	New Hope High School	New Hope, Alabama
G	4	Camryn Register	5 ft 7 in (1.7 m)	Fr	Hebron Christian Academy	Lawrenceville, Georgia
G	5	Francie Morris	5 ft 9 in (1.75 m)	Fr	Trinity Presbyterian High School	Montgomery, Alabama
G/F	10	Aubrey Blankenship	6 ft 0 in (1.83 m)	RS So	Green Hill High School	Mount Juliet, Tennessee
G	11	Briana Rivera	5 ft 5 in (1.65 m)	So	Austin Peay	Orlando, Florida
F	12	Carla Baguda	6 ft 2 in (1.88 m)	Fr	Institut Montilivi	Barcelona, Spain
G	20	Alyssa Tarpley	5 ft 10 in (1.78 m)	Sr	Gunter High School	Gunter, Texas
G	21	Sydney Martin	5 ft 10 in (1.78 m)	RS Fr	Northern Kentucky	Somerset, Kentucky
G	22	Sierra Godbolt	5 ft 6 in (1.68 m)	Sr	UCF	Orlando, Florida
F	32	Yael Maayan	6 ft 1 in (1.85 m)	So	Hof HaSharon	Yehuda, Israel
F	33	Martha Bishop	6 ft 1 in (1.85 m)	Jr	Spartanburg High School	Spartanburg, South Carolina
C	44	Emily Bowman	6 ft 5 in (1.96 m)	RS Sr	Vanderbilt	Huntsville, Alabama

Head coach

- Matt Wise (Transylvania)

Assistant coach(es)

- Hannah Barber (Alabama)
- Charity Brown (Samford)
- Sally Higgins (West Texas A&M)
- Walker Martin (Michigan State)

Legend

- (C) Team captain
- (S) Suspended
- (I) Ineligible
- (W) Walk-on
- Injured
- Current redshirt

Roster
Last update: March 12, 2025

== Schedule and results ==
Date time, TV	Rank^{#}	Opponent^{#}	Result	Record	Site (attendance) city, state
Non-conference regular season
November 3, 2025*; 11:00 a.m., ESPN+		Montevallo	W 75–53	1–0	Pete Hanna Center (1,715); Homewood, AL
November 8, 2025*; 5:00 p.m., B1G+		at Nebraska	L 46–80	1–1	Pinnacle Bank Arena (4,670); Lincoln, NE
November 13, 2025*; 6:00 p.m., SECN+/ESPN+		at Florida	L 40–87	1–2	O'Connell Center (1,238); Gainesville, FL
November 15, 2025*; 3:00 p.m.		at Florida A&M	W 77–57	2–2	Al Lawson Center (654); Tallahassee, FL
November 19, 2025*; 6:00 p.m., SECN+/ESPN+		at Alabama	L 45–84	2–3	Coleman Coliseum (2,472); Tuscaloosa, AL
November 21, 2025*; 6:00 p.m., ESPN+		Stillman	W 90–35	3–3	Pete Hanna Center (350); Homewood, AL
November 24, 2025*; 1:30 p.m.		vs. Central Arkansas; GSU Thanksgiving Tournament	L 44–67	3–4	GSU Convocation Center (1,154); Atlanta, GA
November 25, 2025*; 11:00 a.m., ESPN+		at Georgia State; GSU Thanksgiving Tournament	L 64–69	3–5	GSU Convocation Center (1,207); Atlanta, GA
November 24, 2025*; 1:30 p.m.		vs. Stony Brook; GSU Thanksgiving Tournament	W 58–48	4–5	GSU Convocation Center (1,130); Atlanta, GA
December 1, 2025*; 7:00 p.m., B1G+		at Minnesota	L 40–77	4–6	Williams Arena; Minneapolis, MN
December 4, 2025*; 11:00 a.m., ESPN+		at Tennessee Tech	L 60–82	4–7	Hooper Eblen Center (5,845); Cookeville, TN
December 7, 2025*; 3:00 p.m., ESPN+		North Alabama	L 60–68 ^{OT}	4–8	Pete Hanna Center (373); Homewood, AL
December 14, 2025*; 3:00 p.m., ESPN+		at USC Upstate	W 74–67	5–8	G. B. Hodge Center (206); Spartanburg, SC
December 18, 2025*; 5:30 p.m., ESPN+		Lipscomb	W 65–59	6–8	Pete Hanna Center (417); Homewood, AL
December 22, 2025*; 6:00 p.m., ESPN+		at UAB	L 49–65	6–9	Bartow Arena (356); Birmingham, AL
December 28, 2025*; 2:00 p.m., SECN+/ESPN+		at Mississippi State	L 54–112	6–10	Humphrey Coliseum (373); Starkville, MS
January 2, 2026*; 2:00 p.m.		Fisk	W 70–54	7–10	Pete Hanna Center (236); Homewood, AL
SoCon regular season
January 8, 2026; 6:00 p.m., ESPN+		at North Carolina A&T	L 64–73	7–11 (0–1)	Bodford Arena (162); Greensboro, NC
January 10, 2026; 1:00 p.m., ESPN+		at Western Carolina	W 73–62	8–11 (1–1)	Ramsey Center (622); Cullowhee, NC
January 17, 2026; 1:00 p.m., ESPN+		at Mercer	L 67–76	8–12 (1–2)	Hawkins Arena (489); Macon, GA
January 22, 2026; 6:00 p.m., ESPN+		Wofford	L 56–80	8–13 (1–3)	Pete Hanna Center (253); Homewood, AL
January 24, 2026; 6:00 p.m., ESPN+		Furman	L 62–70	8–14 (1–4)	Pete Hanna Center (313); Homewood, AL
January 30, 2026; 1:00 p.m., ESPN+		at East Tennessee State	L 44–53	8–15 (1–5)	Brooks Gymnasium (352); Johnson City, TN
February 1, 2026; 6:00 p.m., ESPN+		at Chattanooga	L 40–61	8–16 (1–6)	McKenzie Arena (1,661); Chattanooga, TN
February 5, 2026; 4:00 p.m., ESPN+		Western Carolina	W 73–50	9–16 (2–6)	Pete Hanna Center (273); Homewood, AL
February 7, 2026; 4:00 p.m., ESPN+		UNC Greensboro	W 68–64	10–16 (3–6)	Pete Hanna Center (311); Homewood, AL
February 14, 2026; 2:00 p.m., ESPN+		Mercer	W 68–48	11–16 (4–6)	Pete Hanna Center (311); Homewood, AL
February 19, 2026; 2:00 p.m., ESPN+		at Furman	W 68–59	12–16 (5–6)	Timmons Arena (375); Greenville, SC
February 21, 2026; 2:00 p.m., ESPN+		at Wofford	L 44–52	12–17 (5–7)	Jerry Richardson Indoor Stadium (311); Spartanburg, SC
February 26, 2026; 4:00 p.m., ESPN+		Chattanooga	W 77–70	13–17 (6–7)	Pete Hanna Center (307); Homewood, AL
February 28, 2026; 2:00 p.m., ESPN+		Mercer	L 39–46	13–18 (6–8)	Pete Hanna Center (671); Homewood, AL
SoCon tournament
March 5, 2026; 2:30 p.m., ESPN+	(6)	vs. (3) Wofford; Quarterfinals	W 59–57	14–18	Harrah's Cherokee Center; Asheville, NC
March 6, 2026; 12:15 p.m., ESPN+	(6)	vs. (2) East Tennessee State; Semifinals	W 57–48	15–18	Harrah's Cherokee Center (3,096); Asheville, NC
March 8, 2026; 11:00 a.m., ESPNU	(6)	vs. (1) Chattanooga; Championship	W 72–67	16–18	Harrah's Cherokee Center (1,160); Asheville, NC
NCAA tournament
March 19, 2026*; 6:00 p.m., ESPN2	(16 S4)	vs. (16 S4) Southern; First Four	L 53–65	16–19	Colonial Life Arena (736); Columbia, SC
*Non-conference game. ^{#}Rankings from AP Poll. (#) Tournament seedings in parentheses. Sacramento 4=S4. All times are in Central.
