= 2025–26 Wofford Terriers women's basketball team =

American college basketball season

2025–26 Wofford Terriers women's basketball

SoCon regular season co-champions
- Conference: Southern Conference
- Record: 16–13 (10–4 SoCon)
- Head coach: Jimmy Garrity (10th season)
- Associate head coach: Mike Merrill
- Assistant coaches: Trent Bunn; Destiny Thomas
- Home arena: Jerry Richardson Indoor Stadium

2025–26 Southern Conference women's basketball standings
	Conf.				Overall
Team	W		L	PCT	W		L	PCT
Chattanooga	10	–	4	.714	20	–	11	.645
East Tennessee State	10	–	4	.714	18	–	13	.581
Wofford	10	–	4	.714	16	–	13	.552
Furman	9	–	5	.643	18	–	13	.581
Mercer	7	–	7	.500	17	–	13	.567
Samford †	6	–	8	.429	16	–	19	.457
UNC Greensboro	4	–	10	.286	14	–	16	.467
Western Carolina	0	–	14	.000	3	–	26	.103
† 2026 SoCon tournament winner

The 2025–26 Wofford Terriers women's basketball team represented Wofford College during the 2025–26 NCAA Division I women's basketball season. The Terriers, led by tenth-year head coach Jimmy Garrity, played their home games at Jerry Richardson Indoor Stadium in Spartanburg, South Carolina as members of the Southern Conference (SoCon).

== Previous season ==
The Terriers finished the 2024–25 season 17–12, 8–6 in SoCon play, to finish in a tie for third place. They defeated Samford, before falling to top-seeded and eventual tournament champions UNC Greensboro in the semifinals of the SoCon tournament.

== Preseason ==
On October 1, 2025, the Southern Conference released their preseason poll. Wofford was picked to finish fourth in the conference.

=== Preseason rankings ===
SoCon Preseason Poll
Place	Team	Votes
1	Chattanooga	48 (6)
2	UNC Greensboro	39 (2)
3	East Tennessee State	38
4	Wofford	28
5	Furman	26
6	Samford	19
7	Western Carolina	14
8	Mercer	12
(#) first-place votes

=== Preseason All-SoCon Team ===
Preseason All-SoCon Team
Player	Year	Position
Molly Masingale	Sophomore	Guard

== Roster ==
2025–26 Wofford Terriers women's basketball team
Players
Coaches

Pos.	#	Name	Height	Year	Previous school	Hometown
G	1	Elli Porter	5 ft 8 in (1.73 m)	Fr	Rock Bridge High School	Columbia, Missouri
G	2	Maddie Heiss	5 ft 10 in (1.78 m)	Jr	Bishop Lynch High School	Dallas, Texas
F	3	Courtney Swider	6 ft 4 in (1.93 m)	Jr	Richmond	Portsmouth, Rhode Island
G	4	Sophia Rueppell	5 ft 8 in (1.73 m)	Jr	Kennesaw State	Jacksonville, Florida
G	5	Molly Masingale	5 ft 9 in (1.75 m)	So	McMinn Central High School	Englewood, Tennessee
G	8	Gabby Mundy	5 ft 6 in (1.68 m)	Fr	Liberty Hill High School	Liberty Hill, Texas
G	10	Sara Deidda	5 ft 11 in (1.8 m)	Jr	KK Trešnjevka 2009	Zagreb, Croatia
F	13	Toni Warren	5 ft 11 in (1.8 m)	So	Cherokee High School	Canton, Georgia
G	20	Madi Hawk	5 ft 10 in (1.78 m)	So	Jefferson County High School	Jefferson City, Tennessee
F	21	Mia Flor	6 ft 2 in (1.88 m)	Sr	Idaho State	Seattle, Washington
G/F	23	Abby Eller	6 ft 0 in (1.83 m)	Fr	Ashe County High School	Warrensville, North Carolina
F	52	Brady Branam	6 ft 2 in (1.88 m)	Fr	The King's Academy	Seymour, Tennessee
F	81	Queen Ikhiuwu	6 ft 1 in (1.85 m)	Jr	Tulsa	Madrid, Spain

Head coach

- Jimmy Garrity (Elon)

Assistant coach(es)

- Mike Merrill (UNC Wilmington)
- Trent Bunn (North Carolina)
- Destiny Thomas (Clemson)

Legend

- (C) Team captain
- (S) Suspended
- (I) Ineligible
- (W) Walk-on
- Injured
- Current redshirt

Roster
Last update: July 31, 2026

== Schedule and results ==
Date time, TV	Rank^{#}	Opponent^{#}	Result	Record	Site (attendance) city, state
Non-conference regular season
November 3, 2025*; 7:00 pm, ESPN+		Converse	W 126–65	1–0	Jerry Richardson Indoor Stadium (471); Spartanburg, SC
November 8, 2025*; 12:00 pm, ESPN+		at High Point	L 73–81	1–1	Qubein Center (4,156); High Point, NC
November 11, 2025*; 7:00 pm, ESPN+		Georgia State	L 68–75	1–2	Jerry Richardson Indoor Stadium (440); Spartanburg, SC
November 16, 2025*; 2:00 pm, ESPN+		at Appalachian State	L 50–77	1–3	Holmes Center (538); Boone, NC
November 22, 2025*; 2:00 pm, ESPN+		at Charlotte	L 59−73	1−4	Halton Arena (631); Charlotte, NC
November 25, 2025*; 4:00 pm, ESPN+		at UNC Asheville	W 80−54	2−4	Kimmel Arena (268); Asheville, NC
November 30, 2025*; 2:00 pm, ESPN+		Georgia Southern	L 52–58	2–5	Jerry Richardson Indoor Stadium (340); Spartanburg, SC
December 4, 2025*; 7:00 pm, ESPN+		at Gardner–Webb	W 58–41	3–5	Paul Porter Arena (127); Boiling Springs, NC
December 6, 2025*; 1:00 pm, ESPN+		Charleston Southern	W 70–42	4–5	Jerry Richardson Indoor Stadium (371); Spartanburg, SC
December 13, 2025*; 1:00 pm, SECN+		at No. 17 Ole Miss	L 52–86	4–6	SJB Pavilion (2,725); Oxford, MS
December 17, 2025*; 11:00 am, ESPN+		at East Carolina	L 59–80	4–7	Williams Arena (4,681); Greenville, NC
December 19, 2025*; 1:00 pm, ESPN+		King	W 92−42	5−7	Jerry Richardson Indoor Stadium (325); Spartanburg, SC
December 28, 2025*; 12:00 pm, ACCN		at Georgia Tech	L 63–79	5–8	McCamish Pavilion (1,937); Atlanta, GA
January 1, 2026*; 1:00 pm, ESPN+		Southern Wesleyan	W 89–43	6–8	Jerry Richardson Indoor Stadium (373); Spartanburg, SC
SoCon regular season
January 8, 2026; 6:00 pm, ESPN+		at Chattanooga	L 42–61	6–9 (0–1)	McKenzie Arena (1,210); Chattanooga, TN
January 10, 2026; 1:30 pm, ESPN+		at East Tennessee State	W 61–57	7–9 (1–1)	Freedom Hall; Johnson City, TN
January 15, 2026; 6:00 pm, ESPN+		Western Carolina	W 71–65	8–9 (2–1)	Jerry Richardson Indoor Stadium (320); Spartanburg, SC
January 17, 2026; 2:00 pm, ESPN+		UNC Greensboro	W 61–59	9–9 (3–1)	Jerry Richardson Indoor Stadium (371); Spartanburg, SC
January 22, 2026; 7:00 pm, ESPN+		at Samford	W 80–56	10–9 (4–1)	Pete Hanna Center (253); Homewood, AL
January 24, 2026; 11:00 am, ESPN+		at Mercer	W 67–64	11–9 (5–1)	Hawkins Arena (433); Macon, GA
January 30, 2026; 6:00 pm, ESPN+/Palmetto		Furman	L 64–65	11–10 (5–2)	Jerry Richardson Indoor Stadium (852); Spartanburg, SC
February 5, 2026; 7:00 pm, ESPN+		East Tennessee State	L 57–61	11–11 (5–3)	Jerry Richardson Indoor Stadium (287); Spartanburg, SC
February 7, 2026; 1:00 pm, ESPN+		Chattanooga	W 67–63	12–11 (6–3)	Jerry Richardson Indoor Stadium (315); Spartanburg, SC
February 12, 2026; 7:00 pm, ESPN+		at UNC Greensboro	W 51–38	13–11 (7–3)	Bodford Arena (462); Greensboro, NC
February 14, 2026; 2:00 pm, ESPN+/ETV		at Western Carolina	W 73–54	14–11 (8–3)	Ramsey Center (563); Cullowhee, NC
February 19, 2026; 11:00 am, ESPN+/CW62/Nexstar		Mercer	W 72–58	15–11 (9–3)	Jerry Richardson Indoor Stadium (1,667); Spartanburg, SC
February 21, 2026; 2:00 pm, ESPN+		Samford	W 52–44	16–11 (10–3)	Jerry Richardson Indoor Stadium (867); Spartanburg, SC
February 28, 2026; 2:00 pm, ESPN+/ETV		at Furman	L 42–64	16–12 (10–4)	Timmons Arena (493); Greenville, SC
SoCon tournament
March 5, 2026; 3:30 pm, ESPN+	(3)	vs. (6) Samford; Quarterfinals	L 57–59	16–13	Harrah's Cherokee Center; Asheville, NC
*Non-conference game. ^{#}Rankings from AP Poll. (#) Tournament seedings in parentheses. All times are in Eastern.
