= 2025–26 Chattanooga Mocs women's basketball team =

American college basketball season

2025–26 Chattanooga Mocs women's basketball

SoCon regular season co-champions

WBIT, First Round
- Conference: Southern Conference
- Record: 20–11 (10–4 SoCon)
- Head coach: Deandra Schirmer (2nd season)
- Associate head coach: Tianni Kelly
- Assistant coaches: Nicole Heyn; Mallory Odell; Alexis Uffmann
- Home arena: McKenzie Arena

2025–26 Southern Conference women's basketball standings
	Conf.				Overall
Team	W		L	PCT	W		L	PCT
Chattanooga	10	–	4	.714	20	–	11	.645
East Tennessee State	10	–	4	.714	18	–	13	.581
Wofford	10	–	4	.714	16	–	13	.552
Furman	9	–	5	.643	18	–	13	.581
Mercer	7	–	7	.500	17	–	13	.567
Samford †	6	–	8	.429	16	–	19	.457
UNC Greensboro	4	–	10	.286	14	–	16	.467
Western Carolina	0	–	14	.000	3	–	26	.103
† 2026 SoCon tournament winner

The 2025–26 Chattanooga Mocs women's basketball team represented the University of Tennessee at Chattanooga during the 2025–26 NCAA Division I women's basketball season. The Mocs, led by second-year head coach Deandra Schirmer, played their home games at McKenzie Arena in Chattanooga, Tennessee as members of the Southern Conference (SoCon).

== Previous season ==
The Mocs finished the 2024–25 season 17–15, 9–5 in SoCon play, to finish in second place. They defeated Mercer, and Furman, before falling to top-seeded UNC Greensboro in the SoCon tournament championship game. They received an at-large bid to the WNIT, where they would defeat Alabama A&M in the first round, before falling to eventual tournament runner-up Troy in the second round.

== Preseason ==
On October 1, 2025, the Southern Conference released their preseason poll. Chattanooga was picked to finish atop the conference, receiving six out of a possible eight first-place votes.

=== Preseason rankings ===
SoCon Preseason Poll
Place	Team	Votes
1	Chattanooga	48 (6)
2	UNC Greensboro	39 (2)
3	East Tennessee State	38
4	Wofford	28
5	Furman	26
6	Samford	19
7	Western Carolina	14
8	Mercer	12
(#) first-place votes

=== Preseason SoCon Player of the Year ===
Preseason SoCon Player of the Year
Player	Year	Position
Caia Elisaldez	Junior	Guard

=== Preseason All-SoCon Team ===
Preseason All-SoCon Team
Player	Year	Position
Gianna Corbitt	Sophomore	Forward
Caia Elisaldez	Junior	Guard

== Roster ==
2025–26 Chattanooga Mocs women's basketball team
Players
Coaches

Pos.	#	Name	Height	Year	Previous school	Hometown
G	5	Sarah Owona	5 ft 9 in (1.75 m)	Jr	Florida SouthWestern State College	Opvelp, Belgium
F	8	Evie Bruce	6 ft 1 in (1.85 m)	Fr	Liberty Hill High School	Liberty Hill, Texas
G	11	Caia Elisaldez	5 ft 5 in (1.65 m)	Jr	Mater Dei High School	Whittier, California
G/F	12	London Weaver	6 ft 1 in (1.85 m)	Fr	North Forsyth High School	Dawsonville, Georgia
G/F	14	Izzy McPherson	5 ft 10 in (1.78 m)	RS Fr	Sycamore High School	Pleasant View, Tennessee
F/C	15	Frode Flos van der Schans	6 ft 4 in (1.93 m)	RS Jr	Orange Lions Academy	Amsterdam, Netherlands
F/C	21	Falon Bedke	6 ft 2 in (1.88 m)	Jr	College of Southern Idaho	Oakley, Idaho
F	22	Gianna Corbitt	6 ft 1 in (1.85 m)	So	Blanche Ely High School	Oakland Park, Florida
G/F	23	Ava Card	6 ft 0 in (1.83 m)	So	Saint James School	Montgomery, Alabama
G	33	Kami Wilson	5 ft 10 in (1.78 m)	Fr	Lakeway Christian Academy	Rogersville, Tennessee
G/F	34	Kalifa Ford	5 ft 10 in (1.78 m)	GS	Valdosta State	Bono, Arkansas

Head coach

- Deandra Schirmer (USC Aiken)

Assistant coach(es)

- Tianni Kelly (Charleston (WV))
- Nicole Heyn (Texas A&M International)
- Mallory Odell (Valdosta State)
- Alexis Uffmann (Columbia (MO))

Legend

- (C) Team captain
- (S) Suspended
- (I) Ineligible
- (W) Walk-on
- Injured
- Current redshirt

Roster
Last update: July 28, 2026

== Schedule and results ==
Date time, TV	Rank^{#}	Opponent^{#}	Result	Record	Site (attendance) city, state
Non-conference regular season
November 3, 2025*; 12:00 pm, ESPN+		King	W 82–34	1–0	McKenzie Arena (2,465); Chattanooga, TN
November 6, 2025*; 5:00 pm, SECN+		at Florida	L 52–94	1–1	O'Connell Center (1,748); Gainesville, FL
November 9, 2025*; 3:00 pm, ESPN+		at Lipscomb	W 59–56	2–1	Allen Arena (757); Nashville, TN
November 12, 2025*; 7:00 pm, ESPN+		at Troy	L 56–73	2–2	Trojan Arena (2,465); Troy, AL
November 16, 2025*; 2:00 pm, ESPN+		UAB	L 66−79	2−3	McKenzie Arena (1,347); Chattanooga, TN
November 20, 2025*; 6:00 pm, ESPN+		Austin Peay	L 54−68	2−4	McKenzie Arena (1,272); Chattanooga, TN
November 22, 2025*; 2:00 pm, ESPN+		Northern Kentucky	W 64–62	3–4	McKenzie Arena (1,765); Chattanooga, TN
November 28, 2025*; 5:30 pm, ESPN+		vs. Sacramento State; CBU Classic	W 59–57	4–4	Fowler Events Center (196); Riverside, CA
November 29, 2025*; 5:30 pm, ESPN+		vs. UC Santa Barbara; CBU Classic	L 64–66	4–5	Fowler Events Center (201); Riverside, CA
December 7, 2025*; 2:00 pm, ESPN+		Bellarmine	W 78–73	5–5	McKenzie Arena (1,185); Chattanooga, TN
December 11, 2025*; 7:00 pm, ESPN+		at Tennessee State	W 81–51	6–5	Gentry Center (133); Nashville, TN
December 19, 2025*; 6:00 pm, ESPN+		Western Kentucky	W 59−58	7−5	McKenzie Arena (1,195); Chattanooga, TN
December 30, 2025*; 6:00 pm, ESPN+		Southern Wesleyan	W 97–46	8–5	McKenzie Arena (1,220); Chattanooga, TN
SoCon regular season
January 8, 2026; 6:00 pm, ESPN+		Wofford	W 61–42	9–5 (1–0)	McKenzie Arena (1,210); Chattanooga, TN
January 10, 2026; 2:00 pm, ESPN+		Furman	W 61–44	10–5 (2–0)	McKenzie Arena (1,452); Chattanooga, TN
January 17, 2026; 4:00 pm, ESPN+		at East Tennessee State	W 53–41	11–5 (3–0)	Brooks Gymnasium (614); Johnson City, TN
January 22, 2026; 6:00 pm, Nexstar/ESPN+		at UNC Greensboro	W 52–40	12–5 (4–0)	Bodford Arena (541); Greensboro, NC
January 24, 2026; 11:00 am, ESPN+		at Western Carolina	W 61–52	13–5 (5–0)	Ramsey Center (697); Cullowhee, NC
January 30, 2026; 6:00 pm, ESPN+		Mercer	W 72–59	14–5 (6–0)	McKenzie Arena (1,410); Chattanooga, TN
February 1, 2026; 2:00 pm, ESPN+		Samford	W 61–40	15–5 (7–0)	McKenzie Arena (1,661); Chattanooga, TN
February 5, 2026; 7:00 pm, ESPN+		at Furman	W 62–54	16–5 (8–0)	Timmons Arena (273); Greenville, SC
February 7, 2026; 1:00 pm, ESPN+		at Wofford	L 63–67	16–6 (8–1)	Jerry Richardson Indoor Stadium; Spartanburg, SC
February 14, 2026; 2:00 pm, ESPN+		East Tennessee State	L 90–91 ^{2OT}	16–7 (8–2)	McKenzie Arena (1,653); Chattanooga, TN
February 19, 2026; 6:00 pm, ESPN+		Western Carolina	W 52–36	17–7 (9–2)	McKenzie Arena (1,332); Chattanooga, TN
February 21, 2026; 2:00 pm, ESPN+		UNC Greensboro	W 56–54	18–7 (10–2)	McKenzie Arena (1,632); Chattanooga, TN
February 26, 2026; 5:00 pm, ESPN+		at Samford	L 70–77	18–8 (10–3)	Pete Hanna Center (307); Homewood, AL
February 28, 2026; 2:00 pm, ESPN+		at Mercer	L 55–68	18–9 (10–4)	Hawkins Arena (1,030); Macon, GA
SoCon tournament
March 5, 2026; 11:00 am, ESPN+	(1)	vs. (8) Western Carolina; Quarterfinals	W 66–47	19–9	Harrah's Cherokee Center; Asheville, NC
March 6, 2026; 11:00 am, ESPN+	(1)	vs. (4) Furman; Semifinals	W 76–65	20–9	Harrah's Cherokee Center; Asheville, NC
March 8, 2026; 12:00 pm, ESPNU	(1)	vs. (6) Samford; Championship	L 67–72	20–10	Harrah's Cherokee Center (1,160); Asheville, NC
WBIT
March 19, 2026*; 8:00 pm, ESPN+		at (1) North Dakota State; First Round	L 62–75	20–11	Scheels Center (1,490); Fargo, ND
*Non-conference game. ^{#}Rankings from AP Poll. (#) Tournament seedings in parentheses. All times are in Eastern.
