= Mason Shipley =

American football player (born 2002)

Profile
- Position: Placekicker

Personal information
- Born: January 1, 2002 (age 24); Plano, Texas, U.S.
- Listed height: 6 ft 0 in (1.83 m)
- Listed weight: 187 lb (85 kg)

Career information
- High school: Liberty Hill (Liberty Hill, Texas)
- College: Oklahoma State (2020); Texas State (2021–2024); Texas (2025)
- NFL draft: 2026: undrafted

Career history
- New Orleans Saints (2026)*
- * Offseason or practice squad member only

Awards and highlights
- First team All-Sun Belt (2023)

Mason Shipley (born January 1, 2002) is an American football kicker. He played college football for the Texas Longhorns, Texas State Bobcats, and for the Oklahoma State Cowboys.

== Early life ==
Shipley attended Liberty Hill High School in Williamson County, Texas, and committed to play college football for the Oklahoma State Cowboys, joining the team as a walk-on.

== College career ==
=== Oklahoma State ===
In 2020, Shipley did not appear in any games. He entered the NCAA transfer portal after the season.

=== Texas State ===
Shipley transferred to play for the Texas State Bobcats. During his four-year career as a Bobcat from 2021 to 2024, he went 31 for 35 on field goal attempts, while hitting a career-long 60-yard field goal. After the conclusion of the 2024 season, he once again entered the NCAA transfer portal.

=== Texas ===
Shipley transferred to play for the Texas Longhorns. Entering the 2025 season, he won the Longhorns starting kicker and kickoff specialist job. In week 7 of the 2025 season, Shipley hit the game-winning 45-yard field goal in an overtime victory versus Kentucky. During his lone season as a Longhorn in 2025, he converted 20 of 24 field goals, while making all 48 extra point attempts. After the conclusion of the season, Shipley declared for the 2026 NFL draft.

== Professional career ==
Pre-draft measurables
Height	Weight	Arm length	Hand span	Wingspan
5 ft 11 1/2 in (1.82 m)	181 lb (82 kg)	30 1/2 in (0.77 m)	8 in (0.20 m)	6 ft 0 1/2 in (1.84 m)
All values from Pro Day

After not being selected in the 2026 NFL draft, Shipley signed with the New Orleans Saints as an undrafted free agent. He signed a three-year contract worth $3.1 million. On June 17, 2026, Shipley was released.

== Personal life ==
Shipley's identical twin brother, Matthew, played as a placekicker at Hawaii and Arkansas.

Shipley married his high school sweetheart, Montana Sowell on July 20, 2024.
