= 2025–26 Furman Paladins women's basketball team =

American college basketball season

2025–26 Furman Paladins women's basketball
- Conference: Southern Conference
- Record: 18–13 (9–5 SoCon)
- Head coach: Pierre Curtis (3rd season)
- Assistant coaches: Dr. Ashley Johnson; Lauren Johnson; Jauwan Scaife
- Home arena: Timmons Arena

2025–26 Southern Conference women's basketball standings
	Conf.				Overall
Team	W		L	PCT	W		L	PCT
Chattanooga	10	–	4	.714	20	–	11	.645
East Tennessee State	10	–	4	.714	18	–	13	.581
Wofford	10	–	4	.714	16	–	13	.552
Furman	9	–	5	.643	18	–	13	.581
Mercer	7	–	7	.500	17	–	13	.567
Samford †	6	–	8	.429	16	–	19	.457
UNC Greensboro	4	–	10	.286	14	–	16	.467
Western Carolina	0	–	14	.000	3	–	26	.103
† 2026 SoCon tournament winner

The 2025–26 Furman Paladins women's basketball team represented Furman University during the 2025–26 NCAA Division I women's basketball season. The Paladins, led by third-year head coach Pierre Curtis, played their home games at Timmons Arena in Greenville, South Carolina as members of the Southern Conference (SoCon).

== Previous season ==
The Paladins finished the 2024–25 season 16–16, 5–9 in SoCon play, to finish in sixth place. In the SoCon tournament, they upset third seed East Tennessee State in the quarterfinals before falling to second seed Chattanooga in the semifinals.

== Preseason ==
On October 1, 2025, the Southern Conference released their preseason poll. Furman was picked to finish fifth in the conference.

=== Preseason rankings ===
SoCon Preseason Poll
Place	Team	Votes
1	Chattanooga	48 (6)
2	UNC Greensboro	39 (2)
3	East Tennessee State	38
4	Wofford	28
5	Furman	26
6	Samford	19
7	Western Carolina	14
8	Mercer	12
(#) first-place votes

=== Preseason All-SoCon Team ===
Preseason All-SoCon Team
Player	Year	Position
Clare Coyle	Sophomore	Forward

== Roster ==
2025–26 Furman Paladins women's basketball team
Players
Coaches

Pos.	#	Name	Height	Year	Previous school	Hometown
G	0	Lauren Bailey	5 ft 8 in (1.73 m)	Jr	Gardner–Webb	Greeneville, TN
G	1	Alyssa Ervin	5 ft 11 in (1.8 m)	So	Elon	Galax, VA
F	2	Clare Coyle	6 ft 1 in (1.85 m)	So	Bishop Kenny High School	Jacksonville, FL
G	3	Sophia Pearl	5 ft 7 in (1.7 m)	Fr	River Ridge High School	Woodstock, GA
F	4	Kyraha Parnell	6 ft 3 in (1.91 m)	So	George Washington	Galax, VA
G	5	Raina McGowens	5 ft 10 in (1.78 m)	So	Wren High School	Pelzer, SC
G	10	Chantelle Stuart	5 ft 9 in (1.75 m)	So	Crestwood Prep	Scarborough, ON
G	11	Samaria Taylor	5 ft 7 in (1.7 m)	So	Fulton High School	Knoxville, TN
G	12	Asa Snyder	5 ft 7 in (1.7 m)	Jr	Porter-Gaud School	Charleston, SC
G/F	13	Hilary Englert	5 ft 11 in (1.8 m)	So	The Bolles School	Ponte Vedra, FL
F	14	Hanna Hansson	6 ft 4 in (1.93 m)	Jr	Riksidrottsgymnasiet Lulea	Stockholm, Sweden
F	21	Tyriana "Ty" Berry	6 ft 3 in (1.91 m)	Fr	Highlands High School	Fort Thomas, KY
G	23	Brooklyn King	6 ft 0 in (1.83 m)	Fr	Cedar Hill High School	Dallas, TX
F	24	Channing Warren	6 ft 3 in (1.91 m)	So	Boston University	Orlando, FL

Head coach

- Pierre Curtis (James Madison)

Assistant coach(es)

- Dr. Ashley Johnson (LSU)
- Lauren Johnson (Southern Wesleyan)
- Jauwan Scaife (Ball State)

Legend

- (C) Team captain
- (S) Suspended
- (I) Ineligible
- (W) Walk-on
- Injured
- Current redshirt

Roster
Last update: July 31, 2026

== Schedule and results ==
Date time, TV	Rank^{#}	Opponent^{#}	Result	Record	Site (attendance) city, state
Non-conference regular season
November 3, 2025*; 7:00 p.m., ESPN+		North Greenville	W 85–27	1–0	Timmons Arena (877); Greenville, SC
November 6, 2025*; 6:30 p.m., SECN+		at Georgia	L 45–91	1–1	Stegeman Coliseum (1,753); Athens, GA
November 10, 2025*; 7:00 p.m., SECN+		at No. 19 Vanderbilt	L 48–96	1–2	Memorial Gymnasium (2,352); Nashville, TN
November 13, 2025*; 7:00 p.m., ESPN+		Georgia State	W 90–89 ^{OT}	2–2	Timmons Arena (474); Greenville, SC
November 16, 2025*; 7:00 p.m., ESPN+		Campbell	L 61–68	2–3	Timmons Arena (397); Greenville, SC
November 19, 2025*; 7:00 p.m., ESPN+		at Radford	L 50−68	2−4	Dedmon Center (1,293); Radford, VA
November 23, 2025*; 2:00 p.m., ESPN+		Clemson	L 58−76	2−5	Timmons Arena (879); Greenville, SC
November 29, 2025*; 2:00 p.m., ESPN+		UNC Asheville	W 74–67	3–5	Timmons Arena (303); Greenville, SC
December 3, 2025*; 7:00 p.m., ESPN+		Presbyterian	W 74–56	4–5	Timmons Arena (185); Greenville, SC
December 7, 2025*; 2:00 p.m., ESPN+		at Georgia Southern	L 56–72	4–6	Hill Convocation Center (874); Statesboro, GA
December 14, 2025*; 2:00 p.m., ESPN+		Mars Hill	W 110–36	5–6	Timmons Arena (473); Greenville, SC
December 19, 2025*; 6:00 p.m., ESPN+		at Charleston Southern	W 66–53	6–6	Buccaneer Field House (135); North Charleston, SC
December 28, 2025*; 2:00 p.m., SECN+		at Florida	L 66−82	6−7	O'Connell Center (1,375); Gainesville, FL
December 30, 2025*; 7:00 p.m., ESPN+		Brevard	W 110–54	7–7	Timmons Arena (481); Greenville, SC
January 3, 2026*; 1:00 p.m., ESPN+		Bob Jones	W 106–21	8–7	Timmons Arena (588); Greenville, SC
SoCon regular season
January 8, 2026; 7:00 p.m., ESPN+		at East Tennessee State	W 72–70	9–7 (1–0)	Brooks Gymnasium (477); Johnson City, TN
January 10, 2026; 2:00 p.m., ESPN+		at Chattanooga	L 44–61	9–8 (1–1)	McKenzie Arena (1,452); Chattanooga, TN
January 15, 2026; 7:00 p.m., ESPN+		UNC Greensboro	W 69–56	10–8 (2–1)	Timmons Arena (317); Greenville, SC
January 17, 2026; 2:00 p.m., ESPN+		Western Carolina	W 69–38	11–8 (3–1)	Timmons Arena (509); Greenville, SC
January 22, 2026; 7:00 p.m., ESPN+		at Mercer	W 60–49	12–8 (4–1)	Hawkins Arena (407); Macon, GA
January 24, 2026; 5:00 p.m., ESPN+		at Samford	W 70–62	13–8 (5–1)	Pete Hanna Center (313); Homewood, AL
January 30, 2026; 6:00 p.m., ESPN+		at Wofford	W 65–64	14–8 (6–1)	Jerry Richardson Indoor Stadium (852); Spartanburg, SC
February 5, 2026; 7:00 p.m., ESPN+		Chattanooga	L 54–62	14–9 (6–2)	Timmons Arena (273); Greenville, SC
February 7, 2026; 2:00 p.m., ESPN+		East Tennessee State	L 55–58	14–10 (6–3)	Timmons Arena (947); Greenville, SC
February 12, 2026; 6:00 p.m., ESPN+		at Western Carolina	W 60–51	15–10 (7–3)	Ramsey Center (684); Cullowhee, NC
February 14, 2026; 2:00 p.m., ESPN+		at UNC Greensboro	W 63–61	16–10 (8–3)	Bodford Arena (422); Greensboro, NC
February 19, 2026; 7:00 p.m., ESPN+		Samford	L 59–68	16–11 (8–4)	Timmons Arena (375); Greenville, SC
February 21, 2026; 2:00 p.m., ESPN+		Mercer	L 63–80	16–12 (8–5)	Timmons Arena (249); Greenville, SC
February 28, 2026; 2:00 p.m., ESPN+		Wofford	W 64–42	17–12 (9–5)	Timmons Arena (493); Greenville, SC
SoCon tournament
March 5, 2026; 5:45 p.m., ESPN+	(4)	vs. (5) Mercer; Quarterfinals	W 66–45	18–12	Harrah's Cherokee Center (1,806); Asheville, NC
March 6, 2026; 11:00 a.m., ESPN+	(4)	vs. (1) Chattanooga; Semifinals	L 65–76	18–13	Harrah's Cherokee Center; Asheville, NC
*Non-conference game. ^{#}Rankings from AP poll. (#) Tournament seedings in parentheses. All times are in Eastern.
