= 2025–26 Mercer Bears women's basketball team =

American college basketball season

2025–26 Mercer Bears women's basketball
- Conference: Southern Conference
- Record: 17–13 (7–7 SoCon)
- Head coach: Michelle Clark-Heard (2nd season)
- Assistant coaches: Blessing Freeman; Britney Snowden; Elizabeth Metress; Luke Carns
- Home arena: Hawkins Arena

2025–26 Southern Conference women's basketball standings
	Conf.				Overall
Team	W		L	PCT	W		L	PCT
Chattanooga	10	–	4	.714	20	–	11	.645
East Tennessee State	10	–	4	.714	18	–	13	.581
Wofford	10	–	4	.714	16	–	13	.552
Furman	9	–	5	.643	18	–	13	.581
Mercer	7	–	7	.500	17	–	13	.567
Samford †	6	–	8	.429	16	–	19	.457
UNC Greensboro	4	–	10	.286	14	–	16	.467
Western Carolina	0	–	14	.000	3	–	26	.103
† 2026 SoCon tournament winner

The 2025–26 Mercer Bears women's basketball team represented Mercer University during the 2025–26 NCAA Division I women's basketball season. The Bears, led by second-year head coach Michelle Clark-Heard, played their home games at Hawkins Arena in Macon, Georgia as members of the Southern Conference (SoCon).

== Previous season ==
The Bears finished the 2024–25 season 8–22, 3–11 in SoCon play, to finish in a tie for seventh (last) place. They were defeated by Chattanooga in the quarterfinals of the SoCon tournament.

== Preseason ==
On October 1, 2025, the Southern Conference released their preseason poll. Mercer was picked to finish eighth (last) in the conference.

=== Preseason rankings ===
SoCon Preseason Poll
Place	Team	Votes
1	Chattanooga	48 (6)
2	UNC Greensboro	39 (2)
3	East Tennessee State	38
4	Wofford	28
5	Furman	26
6	Samford	19
7	Western Carolina	14
8	Mercer	12
(#) first-place votes

=== Preseason All-SoCon Team ===
Preseason All-SoCon Team
Player	Year	Position
Ariana Bennett	Senior	Forward

== Roster ==
2025–26 Mercer Bears women's basketball team
Players
Coaches

Pos.	#	Name	Height	Year	Previous school	Hometown
G	1	Micah O'Dell	6 ft 0 in (1.83 m)	Jr	Robert Morris	St. Louis, Missouri
F	2	Ariana Bennett	6 ft 1 in (1.85 m)	Sr	Southwestern Illinois	Edwardsville, Illinois
G	4	Anaiah White	5 ft 7 in (1.7 m)	Fr	Cypress Ranch High School	Baton Rouge, Louisiana
G	7	Elena Cabello	6 ft 0 in (1.83 m)	RS Jr	Eastern Michigan	Málaga, Spain
G	8	Talia Kemp	5 ft 7 in (1.7 m)	So	Pensacola State	Orlando, Florida
G	9	Nahawa Diarra	5 ft 9 in (1.75 m)	GS	New Mexico	Barcelona, Spain
G	11	Abigail Holtman	5 ft 11 in (1.8 m)	Jr	Cincinnati	Cincinnati, Ohio
F	13	Khadidja Toure	6 ft 1 in (1.85 m)	Jr	New Mexico Junior College	Abidjan, Ivory Coast
F	15	Remi-Hope Drantmann	6 ft 4 in (1.93 m)	Fr	Ace Cambridge International School	Brussels, Belgium
G	23	Stephanie Utomi	5 ft 11 in (1.8 m)	So	Arbor Preparatory High School	Detroit, Michigan
G	24	Stacy Utomi	5 ft 10 in (1.78 m)	RS Fr	Arbor Preparatory High School	Detroit, Michigan
G	25	Talia Harris	5 ft 7 in (1.7 m)	So	Fishers High School	Fishers, Indiana
G	30	Rania Curry	5 ft 9 in (1.75 m)	Fr	Butler High School	Augusta, Georgia
F	32	Lex Brewster	6 ft 0 in (1.83 m)	Jr	Truett McConnell	Marietta, Georgia

Head coach

- Michelle Clark-Heard (Western Kentucky)

Assistant coach(es)

- Blessing Freeman (Mississippi State)
- Britney Snowden (East Tennessee State)
- Elizabeth Metress (Georgia)
- Luke Carns (Louisville)

Legend

- (C) Team captain
- (S) Suspended
- (I) Ineligible
- (W) Walk-on
- Injured
- Current redshirt

Roster
Last update: August 6, 2026

== Schedule and results ==
Date time, TV	Rank^{#}	Opponent^{#}	Result	Record	Site (attendance) city, state
Non-conference regular season
November 3, 2025*; 6:30 pm, ESPN+		at UNC Asheville	W 48–39	1–0	Kimmel Arena (189); Asheville, NC
November 6, 2025*; 7:00 pm, ESPN+		Clemson	L 51–72	1–1	Hawkins Arena (564); Macon, GA
November 10, 2025*; 7:00 pm, ESPN+		Gardner–Webb	W 61–56	2–1	Hawkins Arena (407); Macon, GA
November 13, 2025*; 6:00 pm, ACCNX		at Wake Forest	L 61–66	2–2	LJVM Coliseum (1,000); Winston-Salem, NC
November 19, 2025*; 12:00 pm, SWAC TV		at Jackson State	W 78−68	3−2	Williams Assembly Center (379); Jackson, MS
November 22, 2025*; 6:00 pm, ESPN+		at Georgia Southern	L 72−93	3−3	Hill Convocation Center (323); Statesboro, GA
November 25, 2025*; 7:00 pm, ESPN+		Florida A&M	W 75–59	4–3	Hawkins Arena (518); Macon, GA
November 28, 2025*; 2:00 pm, ESPN+		at Charleston Southern	W 71–45	5–3	Buccaneer Field House (180); North Charleston, SC
December 3, 2025*; 7:00 pm, FloCollege		at Campbell	L 49–71	5–4	Gore Arena (827); Buies Creek, NC
December 6, 2025*; 3:30 pm, ESPN+		at Jacksonville State	L 62–72	5–5	Pete Mathews Coliseum (467); Jacksonville, AL
December 14, 2025*; 2:00 pm, ESPN+		Mississippi Valley State	W 66–43	6–5	Hawkins Arena (419); Macon, GA
December 17, 2025*; 11:00 am, ESPN+		Erskine	W 91−37	7−5	Hawkins Arena (600); Macon, GA
December 20, 2025*; 3:30 pm		vs. Detroit Mercy; Tulane Holiday Tournament	W 64–55	8–5	Devlin Fieldhouse (691); New Orleans, LA
December 21, 2025*; 2:30 pm, ESPN+		at Tulane; Tulane Holiday Tournament	W 70–67 ^{OT}	9–5	Devlin Fieldhouse (600); New Orleans, LA
January 2, 2026*; 7:00 pm, ESPN+		Auburn Montgomery	W 66–55	10–5	Hawkins Arena (407); Macon, GA
SoCon regular season
January 8, 2026; 6:00 pm, ESPN+		at Western Carolina	W 84–75	11–5 (1–0)	Ramsey Center (527); Cullowhee, NC
January 10, 2026; 2:00 pm, ESPN+		at UNC Greensboro	L 59–76	11–6 (1–1)	Bodford Arena (252); Greensboro, NC
January 17, 2026; 2:00 pm, ESPN+		Samford	W 76–67	12–6 (2–1)	Hawkins Arena (489); Macon, GA
January 22, 2026; 7:00 pm, ESPN+		Furman	L 49–60	12–7 (2–2)	Hawkins Arena (407); Macon, GA
January 24, 2026; 11:00 am, ESPN+		Wofford	L 64–67	12–8 (2–3)	Hawkins Arena (433); Macon, GA
January 30, 2026; 6:00 pm, ESPN+		at Chattanooga	L 59–72	12–9 (2–4)	McKenzie Arena (1,410); Chattanooga, TN
February 5, 2026; 7:00 pm, ESPN+		UNC Greensboro	W 67–58	13–9 (3–4)	Hawkins Arena (362); Macon, GA
February 7, 2026; 2:00 pm, ESPN+		Western Carolina	W 61–51	14–9 (4–4)	Hawkins Arena (425); Macon, GA
February 10, 2026; 7:00 pm, ESPN+		at East Tennessee State	W 50–45	15–9 (5–4)	Brooks Gymnasium (365); Johnson City, TN
February 14, 2026; 3:00 pm, ESPN+		at Samford	L 48–68	15–10 (5–5)	Pete Hanna Center (311); Homewood, AL
February 19, 2026; 11:00 am, ESPN+		at Wofford	L 58–72	15–11 (5–6)	Jerry Richardson Indoor Stadium (1,667); Spartanburg, SC
February 21, 2026; 2:00 pm, ESPN+		at Furman	W 80–63	16–11 (6–6)	Timmons Arena (249); Greenville, SC
February 26, 2026; 7:00 pm, ESPN+		East Tennessee State	L 51–58	16–12 (6–7)	Hawkins Arena (432); Macon, GA
February 28, 2026; 2:00 pm, ESPN+		Chattanooga	W 68–55	17–12 (7–7)	Hawkins Arena (1,030); Macon, GA
SoCon tournament
March 5, 2026; 5:45 pm, ESPN+	(5)	vs. (4) Furman; Quarterfinals	L 45–66	17–13	Harrah's Cherokee Center (1,806); Asheville, NC
*Non-conference game. ^{#}Rankings from AP Poll. (#) Tournament seedings in parentheses. All times are in Eastern.
