= Western Carolina Catamounts basketball =

Western Carolina Catamounts basketball may refer to either of the basketball teams that represent Western Carolina University:

- Western Carolina Catamounts men's basketball
- Western Carolina Catamounts women's basketball
