= 2025–26 Clemson Tigers women's basketball team =

Women's college basketball season

2025–26 Clemson Tigers women's basketball

NCAA tournament, First Round
- Conference: Atlantic Coast Conference
- Record: 21–12 (11–7 ACC)
- Head coach: Shawn Poppie (2nd season)
- Assistant coaches: Chris Ayers (2nd season); Sydni Means (2nd season); Katelyn Grisillo (2nd season); Jon Goldberg (2nd season); Jayda Worthy (2nd season)
- Home arena: Littlejohn Coliseum

2025–26 ACC women's basketball standings
	Conf.				Overall
Team	W		L	PCT	W		L	PCT
No. 5 Duke †	16	–	2	.889	27	–	9	.750
No. 11 Louisville	15	–	3	.833	29	–	8	.784
No. 13 North Carolina	14	–	4	.778	28	–	8	.778
NC State	13	–	5	.722	21	–	11	.656
No. 9 Notre Dame	12	–	6	.667	25	–	10	.714
Virginia Tech	12	–	6	.667	23	–	10	.697
Syracuse	12	–	6	.667	24	–	9	.727
No. 19 Virginia	11	–	7	.611	22	–	12	.647
Clemson	11	–	7	.611	21	–	12	.636
California	9	–	9	.500	21	–	15	.583
Georgia Tech	8	–	10	.444	14	–	19	.424
Miami (FL)	8	–	10	.444	18	–	15	.545
Stanford	8	–	10	.444	21	–	14	.600
Florida State	5	–	13	.278	10	–	21	.323
Wake Forest	4	–	14	.222	14	–	18	.438
SMU	2	–	16	.111	9	–	21	.300
Pittsburgh	1	–	17	.056	8	–	23	.258
Boston College	1	–	17	.056	5	–	26	.161
† 2026 ACC tournament winner Rankings from AP Poll

The 2025–26 Clemson Tigers women's basketball team represented Clemson University during the 2025–26 college basketball season. The Tigers were led by second-year head coach Shawn Poppie. The Tigers, members of the Atlantic Coast Conference, played their home games at Littlejohn Coliseum in Clemson, South Carolina.

The Tigers started the season with two wins by at least twenty points before facing off against rivals South Carolina, who were ranked second at the time. Clemson kept the game close in the first half, but the Gamecocks pulled away in the second and won 65–37. The Tigers won a non-conference game before starting ACC play with a loss to twenty-second ranked Louisville. They defeated Furman before heading to The Bahamas to participate in the Baha Mar Hoops Championship Junkanoo Division. The Tigers won their first game there, but lost the second to twentieth-ranked Michigan State. The Tigers returned to the US and lost at Alabama in the ACC–SEC Challenge. They turned their season around from there, winning five straight games, including an ACC victory over Pittsburgh. The streak was broken on New Year's Day with a loss to Virginia. The Tigers went 3–2 over their next five games, with victories over Miami, NC State, and Wake Forest, the final coming in overtime. They lost to Georgia Tech and Virginia Tech over the stretch. Clemson then went 5–1 over their next six games, with the only loss coming against twenty-fifth ranked North Carolina. The streak included wins over Notre Dame, SMU, Florida State, Boston College, and Georgia Tech. The Georgia Tech game reached double overtime. The team went 2–2 in its final four regular season games. The highlight was a victory over ninth-ranked Duke, their only win against a ranked team during the season.

The Tigers finished the 2025–26 season 21–12, 11–7 in ACC play to finish in a tie for eighth place. As the ninth seed in the ACC tournament, they defeated avenged a regular season loss to Virginia in the second round. They could not repeat their regular season success against thrteenth-ranked and top seed Duke in the quarterfinals. Clemson earned an at-large bid to the NCAA Tournament, their first appearance since 2019. The Tigers were the eighth-seed in the Sacramento 4 regional. They lost in overtime in the first round to ninth-seed USC.

== Previous season ==
The Tigers finished the 2024–25 season 14–17, 6–12 in ACC play to finish in a three-way tie for 12th place. As the No. 14 seed in the ACC tournament, they defeated Stanford before losing to Louisville in the second round.

== Offseason ==
=== Departures ===
Departures
Name	Number	Pos.	Height	Year	Hometown	Reason for departure
Loyal McQueen	1	G	5'8"	Graduate student	Florence, South Carolina	Graduated
Jordy Griggs	3	G/F	6'2"	Sophomore	Moreno Valley, California	Entered transfer portal
Summah Evans	7	F	6'0"	Graduate student	Cairns, Australia	Graduated
Kylee Kellermann	10	G	5'6"	Sophomore	Charleston, South Carolina	—
Maddi Cluse	11	G	5'10"	Senior	Sagamore Hills, Ohio	Graduated
Bella Ranallo	13	G	5'6"	Sophomore	Lake Forest, Illinois	Transferred to Ohio
Addie Porter	14	G	5'4"	Senior	Lebanon, Tennessee	Graduated
Tessa Miller	22	F	6'2"	Senior	Crossville, Tennessee	Graduated
Madi Ott	30	G	5'10"	Senior	Frisco, Texas	Graduated
Anya Poole	31	F	6'2"	Graduate student	Raleigh, North Carolina	Graduated

=== Incoming transfers ===
Incoming transfers
Name	Number	Pos.	Height	Year	Hometown	Previous school
Taylor Johnson-Matthews	10	G	5'9"	Senior	Cleveland, Ohio	DePaul
Rusne Augustinaite	11	G	6'0"	Junior	Šiauliai, Lithuania	Georgia Tech
Rachael Rose	14	G	5'7"	Senior	Scranton, Pennsylvania	Wofford
Hadley Periman	21	G/F	6'2"	Senior	Tuttle, Oklahoma	Tulsa
DeMeara Hinds	25	F	6'2"	Graduate student	Douglasville, Georgia	Wake Forest
Morgan Lee	31	C	6'5"	Senior	Kent, Connecticut	Marist

=== 2025 recruiting class ===
College recruiting
Name	Hometown	School	Height	Weight	Commit date
Ja'Kerra Butler; G/F	Lawrenceville, Georgia	Hebron Christian Academy	6 ft 1 in (1.85 m)	N/A	Mar 19, 2025
Ja'Kerra Butler; G/F	Recruit ratings: ESPN: (NR)				
Holland Harris; G/F	Orlando, Florida	Montverde Academy	6 ft 1 in (1.85 m)	N/A	Sep 19, 2024
Holland Harris; G/F	Recruit ratings: 247Sports: ESPN: (93)				
Amaia Jackson; G	Rochester, New York	Montverde Academy	5 ft 8 in (1.73 m)	N/A	Sep 27, 2024
Amaia Jackson; G	Recruit ratings: ESPN: (91)				
Overall recruit ranking:
Note: In many cases, Scout, Rivals, 247Sports, On3, and ESPN may conflict in their listings of height and weight.; In these cases, the average was taken. ESPN grades are on a 100-point scale.; Sources:

== Roster ==
2025–26 Clemson Tigers women's basketball team
Players
Coaches

Pos.	#	Name	Height	Year	Previous school	Hometown
G/F	0	Holland Harris	6 ft 1 in (1.85 m)	Fr	Montverde Academy	Orlando, FL
G	1	Amaia Jackson	5 ft 8 in (1.73 m)	Fr	Montverde Academy	Rochester, NY
G/F	2	Ja'Kerra Butler	6 ft 1 in (1.85 m)	Fr	Hebron	Lawrenceville, GA
G	5	Hannah Kohn	5 ft 9 in (1.75 m)	Jr	Hagerty; Chattanooga	Oviedo FL
G	10	Taylor Johnson-Matthews	5 ft 9 in (1.75 m)	Sr	Charles F. Brush; DePaul	Cleveland, OH
G	11	Rusne Augustinaite	6 ft 0 in (1.83 m)	Jr	Montverde Academy; Georgia Tech	Šiauliai, Lithuania
G	12	Mia Moore	5 ft 6 in (1.68 m)	Sr	St. Francis; UAB	Alpharetta, GA
G	14	Rachael Rose	5 ft 7 in (1.7 m)	Sr	Wofford	Scranton, PA
F	20	Morgan Miller	6 ft 2 in (1.88 m)	So	Andover	Andover, MN
G/F	21	Hadley Periman	6 ft 2 in (1.88 m)	Sr	Tuttle; Tulsa	Tuttle, OK
F	25	DeMeara Hinds	6 ft 2 in (1.88 m)	GS	Lithia Springs; Wake Forest	Douglasville, GA
C	31	Morgan Lee	6 ft 5 in (1.96 m)	Sr	Kent School; Marist	Kent, CT
F	32	Raven Thompson	5 ft 10 in (1.78 m)	Jr	Langston Hughes; Chattanooga	Atlanta, GA

Head coach

- Shawn Poppie (Limestone)

Assistant coach(es)

- Chris Ayers (Florida A&M)
- Sydni Means (Mercer)
- Katelyn Grisillo (USC Aiken)
- Jon Goldberg (Emerson)
- Jayda Worthy (Radford)

Legend

- (C) Team captain
- (S) Suspended
- (I) Ineligible
- (W) Walk-on
- Injured
- Current redshirt

Roster
Last update: September 30, 2025

== Schedule ==
Date time, TV	Rank^{#}	Opponent^{#}	Result	Record	High points	High rebounds	High assists	Site (attendance) city, state
Regular season
November 3, 2025*; 11:00 a.m., ACCNX		USC Upstate	W 76–38	1–0	19 – Augustinaite	5 – Tied	3 – Tied	Littlejohn Coliseum (5,839); Clemson, SC
November 6, 2025*; 7:00 p.m., ESPN+		at Mercer	W 72–51	2–0	20 – Moore	10 – Tied	5 – Thompson	Hawkins Arena (529); Macon, GA
November 11, 2025*; 6:00 p.m., ESPN2		at No. 2 South Carolina; Rivalry	L 37–65	2–1	9 – Johnson-Matthews	8 – Hinds	3 – Periman	Colonial Life Arena (16,623); Columbia, SC
November 13, 2025*; 7:00 p.m., ACCNX		American	W 78–38	3–1	16 – Tied	10 – Tied	4 – Moore	Littlejohn Coliseum (723); Clemson, SC
November 16, 2025; 3:00 p.m., ESPN2		No. 22 Louisville	L 54–65	3–2 (0–1)	17 – Augustinaite	8 – Tied	5 – Moore	Littlejohn Coliseum (1,004); Clemson, SC
November 23, 2025*; 2:00 p.m., ESPN+		at Furman	W 76–58	4–2	16 – Hinds	6 – Tied	11 – Moore	Timmons Arena (879); Greenville, SC
November 25, 2025*; 7:00 p.m., ACCN		Louisiana–Monroe	Postponed					Littlejohn Coliseum; Clemson, SC
November 28, 2025*; 4:00 p.m., FloHoops		vs. Western Carolina; Baha Mar Hoops Championship Junkanoo Division semifinals	W 77–44	5–2	18 – Moore	7 – Periman	6 – Moore	Baha Mar Convention Center (247); Nassau, The Bahamas
November 30, 2025*; 6:30 p.m., FloHoops		vs. No. 20 Michigan State; Baha Mar Hoops Championship Junkanoo Division Final	L 64–72	5–3	17 – Augustinaite	10 – Hinds	7 – Moore	Baha Mar Convention Center (257); Nassau, The Bahamas
December 4, 2025*; 7:00 p.m., ESPNU		at Alabama; ACC–SEC Challenge	L 48–72	5–4	10 – Kohn	8 – Periman	3 – Tied	Coleman Coliseum (2,525); Tuscaloosa, AL
December 7, 2025*; 2:00 p.m., ACCNX		Appalachian State	W 78–59	6–4	21 – Moore	4 – Tied	5 – Tied	Littlejohn Coliseum (862); Clemson, SC
December 14, 2025; 2:00 p.m., ACCNX		Pittsburgh	W 73–41	7–4 (1–1)	19 – Augustinaite	9 – Hinds	5 – Moore	Littlejohn Coliseum (1,060); Clemson, SC
December 17, 2025*; 11:00 a.m., ESPN+		at Charleston Southern	W 78–52	8–4	18 – Tied	9 – Hinds	4 – Rose	Buccaneer Field House (390); North Charleston, SC
December 21, 2025*; 2:00 p.m., ACCNX		North Florida	W 84–62	9–4	19 – Augustinaite	11 – Thompson	6 – Moore	Littlejohn Coliseum (1,004); Clemson, SC
December 28, 2025*; 3:00 p.m., NECFrontRow		at Chicago State	W 97–44	10–4	23 – Johson-Matthews	7 – Periman	6 – Moore	Jones Convocation Center (201); Chicago, IL
January 1, 2026; 7:00 p.m., ACCNX		at Virginia	L 63–73	10–5 (1–2)	16 – Rose	7 – Hinds	7 – Rose	John Paul Jones Arena (4,032); Charlottesville, VA
January 4, 2026; 2:00 p.m., ACCNX		at Miami (FL)	W 70–55	11–5 (2–2)	24 – Thompson	7 – Periman	12 – Moore	Watsco Center (914); Coral Gables, FL
January 8, 2026; 8:00 p.m., ACCN		NC State	W 75–65	12–5 (3–2)	19 – Rose	10 – Moore	4 – Tied	Littlejohn Coliseum (861); Clemson, SC
January 11, 2026; 4:00 p.m., ACCN		at Georgia Tech	L 55–58	12–6 (3–3)	15 – Thompson	9 – Hinds	6 – Moore	McCamish Pavilion (6,125); Atlanta, GA
January 18, 2026; 12:00 p.m., ACCN		Wake Forest	W 78–71 ^{OT}	13–6 (4–3)	20 – Rose	9 – Hinds	4 – Tied	Littlejohn Coliseum (1,133); Clemson, SC
January 22, 2026; 6:00 p.m., ACCNX		at Virginia Tech	L 68–71	13–7 (4–4)	20 – Johnson-Matthews	8 – Periman	4 – Hinds	Cassell Coliseum (3,992); Blacksburg, VA
January 25, 2026; 3:00 p.m., ACCNX		at Notre Dame	W 65–58	14–7 (5–4)	18 – Johnson-Matthews	7 – Hinds	3 – Tied	Purcell Pavilion (8,295); Notre Dame, IN
January 29, 2026; 7:00 p.m., ACCNX		SMU	W 83–54	15–7 (6–4)	21 – Augustinaite	10 – Hinds	6 – Moore	Littlejohn Coliseum (927); Clemson, SC
February 1, 2026; 6:00 p.m., ACCN		Florida State	W 77–58	16–7 (7–4)	18 – Thompson	15 – Periman	5 – Periman	Littlejohn Coliseum (1,118); Clemson, SC
February 5, 2026; 6:00 p.m., ACCN		at No. 25 North Carolina	L 44–53	16–8 (7–5)	15 – Augustinaite	4 – Thompson	2 – Tied	Carmichael Arena (3,024); Chapel Hill, NC
February 8, 2026; 2:00 p.m., ACCNX		Boston College	W 83–59	17–8 (8–5)	30 – Moore	12 – Moore	6 – Moore	Littlejohn Coliseum (1,160); Clemson, SC
February 12, 2026; 8:00 p.m., ACCN		Georgia Tech	W 67–65 ^{2OT}	18–8 (9–5)	31 – Moore	16 – Thompson	3 – Moore	Littlejohn Coliseum (915); Clemson, SC
February 15, 2026; 2:00 p.m., ACCNX		at Syracuse	L 64–68	18–9 (9–6)	17 – Tied	5 – Moore	7 – Moore	JMA Wireless Dome (4,847); Syracuse, NY
February 22, 2026; 2:00 p.m., ESPN2		No. 9 Duke	W 53–51	19–9 (10–6)	13 – Hinds	8 – Hinds	6 – Moore	Littlejohn Coliseum (3,218); Clemson, SC
February 26, 2026; 10:00 p.m., ACCNX		at California	W 70–63	20–9 (11–6)	21 – Moore	11 – Thompson	4 – Rose	Haas Pavilion (2,811); Berkeley, CA
March 1, 2026; 2:00 p.m., The CW		at Stanford	L 50–85	20–10 (11–7)	10 – Augustinaite	6 – Harris	2 – Tied	Maples Pavilion (3,034); Stanford, CA
ACC Women's Tournament
March 5, 2026*; 11:00 a.m., ACCN	(9)	vs. (8) Virginia; Second Round	W 63–50	21–10	19 – Moore	11 – Thompson	5 – Rose	Gas South Arena (6,203); Duluth, GA
March 6, 2026*; 11:00 a.m., ACCN	(9)	vs. (1) No. 13 Duke; Quarterfinals	L 46–60	21–11	17 – Moore	8 – Hinds	5 – Rose	Gas South Arena (8,233); Duluth, GA
NCAA Women's Tournament
March 21, 2026*; 3:30 p.m., ESPN2	(8 S4)	vs. (9 S4) USC; Round of 64	L 67–71 ^{OT}	21–12	16 – Johnson-Matthews	12 – Thompson	6 – Moore	Colonial Life Arena (10,483); Columbia, SC
*Non-conference game. ^{#}Rankings from AP Poll. (#) Tournament seedings in parentheses. S4=Sacramento 4. All times are in Eastern.

== Statistics ==
Player	GP	GS	MPG	FG%	3P%	FT%	RPG	APG	PPG
Mia Moore	32	32	32.1	45.8%	37.0%	66.9%	5.4	4.7	13.3
Rusne Augustinaite	33	29	24.5	41.5%	42.1%	82.6%	2.8	0.8	10.6
Taylor Johnson-Matthews	33	5	21.3	40.8%	39.0%	74.1%	2.5	0.6	9.5
Rachel Rose	32	21	27.4	45.0%	32.5%	74.1%	2.5	2.4	8.6
Demeara Hinds	31	15	20.7	58.9%	—	46.7%	6.3	0.9	8.2
Raven Thompson	33	31	26.1	47.3%	31.5%	87.5%	4.5	1.5	7.5
Hannah Kohn	33	12	18.9	30.6%	30.1%	66.7%	1.6	0.7	4.7
Hadley Periman	32	20	22.3	26.3%	18.2%	66.7%	5.5	1.2	2.6
Holland Harris	22	0	8.5	37.5%	37.5%	38.5%	2.2	0.3	2.1
Morgan Lee	21	0	6.2	39.0%	17.6%	100.0%	1.1	0.1	2.0
Morgan Miller	10	0	3.6	66.7%	75.0%	37.5%	0.9	—	1.8
Amaia Jackson	13	0	6.5	34.8%	18.2%	62.5%	0.5	0.5	1.8

== Rankings ==
Ranking movements Legend: ██ Increase in ranking ██ Decrease in ranking — = Not ranked RV = Received votes
	Week																				
Poll	Pre	1	2	3	4	5	6	7	8	9	10	11	12	13	14	15	16	17	18	19	Final
AP	—	—	—	—	—	—	—	—	—*	—	—	—	—	—	—	—	—	—	—	—	—
Coaches	—	—	—	—	—	—	—	—	RV	—	—	—	—	—	—	—	—	—	—	—	—

*AP did not release a week 8 poll.
