= 2025–26 East Tennessee State Buccaneers women's basketball team =

American college basketball season

2025–26 East Tennessee State Buccaneers women's basketball
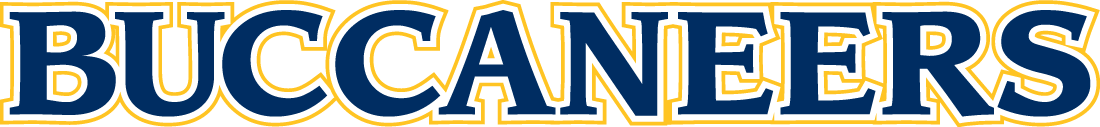

SoCon regular season co-champions
- Conference: Southern Conference
- Record: 18–13 (10–4 SoCon)
- Head coach: Brenda Mock Brown (4th season)
- Assistant coaches: Honey Brown; Joe Silvestri; Eric Gracia; Nadiria Evans
- Home arena: Brooks Gymnasium

2025–26 Southern Conference women's basketball standings
	Conf.				Overall
Team	W		L	PCT	W		L	PCT
Chattanooga	10	–	4	.714	20	–	11	.645
East Tennessee State	10	–	4	.714	18	–	13	.581
Wofford	10	–	4	.714	16	–	13	.552
Furman	9	–	5	.643	18	–	13	.581
Mercer	7	–	7	.500	17	–	13	.567
Samford †	6	–	8	.429	16	–	19	.457
UNC Greensboro	4	–	10	.286	14	–	16	.467
Western Carolina	0	–	14	.000	3	–	26	.103
† 2026 SoCon tournament winner

The 2025–26 East Tennessee State Buccaneers women's basketball team represented East Tennessee State University during the 2025–26 NCAA Division I women's basketball season. The Buccaneers, led by fourth-year head coach Brenda Mock Brown, played their home games at Brooks Gymnasium in Johnson City, Tennessee as members of the Southern Conference (SoCon).

== Previous season ==
The Buccaneers finished the 2024–25 season 17–13, 8–6 in SoCon play, to finish in a tie for third place. They were defeated by Furman in the quarterfinals of the SoCon tournament.

== Preseason ==
On October 1, 2025, the Southern Conference released their preseason poll. East Tennessee State was picked to finish third in the conference.

=== Preseason rankings ===
SoCon Preseason Poll
Place	Team	Votes
1	Chattanooga	48 (6)
2	UNC Greensboro	39 (2)
3	East Tennessee State	38
4	Wofford	28
5	Furman	26
6	Samford	19
7	Western Carolina	14
8	Mercer	12
(#) first-place votes

=== Preseason All-SoCon Team ===
Preseason All-SoCon Team
Player	Year	Position
Meghan Downing	Senior	Forward
Carmen Richardson	Sophomore	Guard

== Roster ==
2025–26 East Tennessee State Buccaneers women's basketball team
Players
Coaches

Pos.	#	Name	Height	Year	Previous school	Hometown
G	0	Paige Lyons	5 ft 6 in (1.68 m)	RS Sr	Wagner	Atlanta, Georgia
G	1	Lucy Hood	5 ft 9 in (1.75 m)	So	Rabun County High School	Rabun Gap, Georgia
G	3	SaBreya Monsanto	5 ft 9 in (1.75 m)	Fr	Heathwood Hall Episcopal School	Columbia, South Carolina
G	4	Maya McCorkle	5 ft 9 in (1.75 m)	Fr	Cannon School	Charlotte, North Carolina
G	5	Gemma Grüttner Bacoul	5 ft 10 in (1.78 m)	Sr	McCook Community College	Berlin, Germany
G	7	Daniela López	5 ft 10 in (1.78 m)	Jr	Xavier	Barcelona, Spain
G	8	Yanessa Boyd	5 ft 9 in (1.75 m)	Jr	Saint Francis (PA)	Frederick, Maryland
G	10	Carmen Richardson	5 ft 7 in (1.7 m)	So	Colonial High School	Orlando, Florida
C	11	Lucia France	6 ft 2 in (1.88 m)	Fr	Traverse City Central High School	Traverse City, Michigan
G	15	Jaidyn Harper	5 ft 10 in (1.78 m)	So	St. John's College High School	Herndon, Virginia
F	20	Meghan Downing	6 ft 2 in (1.88 m)	Sr	Tri-Village High School	New Madison, Ohio
F	21	Kennedy Younkin	6 ft 2 in (1.88 m)	So	Teays Valley High School	Ashville, Ohio
G	24	Anala Nelson	5 ft 7 in (1.7 m)	GS	Austin Peay	Columbia, South Carolina
G	32	Emmah McAmis	5 ft 7 in (1.7 m)	Fr	Central High School	Wise, Virginia

Head coach

- Brenda Mock Brown (Wake Forest)

Assistant coach(es)

- Honey Brown (Maryville)
- Joe Silvestri (Central Florida)
- Eric Gracia (Texas–Pan American)
- Nadiria Evans (UNC Asheville)

Legend

- (C) Team captain
- (S) Suspended
- (I) Ineligible
- (W) Walk-on
- Injured
- Current redshirt

Roster
Last update: July 30, 2026

== Schedule and results ==
Date time, TV	Rank^{#}	Opponent^{#}	Result	Record	Site (attendance) city, state
Non-conference regular season
November 3, 2025*; 7:00 pm, ESPN+		Elon	L 56–65 ^{OT}	0–1	Brooks Gymnasium (585); Johnson City, TN
November 7, 2025*; 6:30 pm, SECN+		at No. 8 Tennessee	L 47–97	0–2	Thompson–Boling Arena (10,671); Knoxville, TN
November 12, 2025*; 2:00 pm, ESPN+		Kennesaw State	L 63–64	0–3	Brooks Gymnasium (234); Johnson City, TN
November 15, 2025*; 4:00 pm, ESPN+		Claflin	W 69–31	1–3	Brooks Gymnasium (296); Johnson City, TN
November 20, 2025*; 7:00 pm, ESPN+		at Tennessee Tech	L 52−61	1−4	Hooper Eblen Center (735); Cookeville, TN
November 22, 2025*; 2:00 pm, ESPN+		at Memphis	L 54−60	1−5	Elma Roane Fieldhouse (659); Memphis, TN
November 28, 2025*; 4:30 pm, ESPN+		vs. Bellarmine; Louisville MTE	W 55–49	2–5	KFC Yum! Center (426); Louisville, KY
November 29, 2025*; 3:30 pm, ESPN+		vs. No. 23 Louisville; Louisville MTE	L 50–88	2–6	Knights Hall (553); Louisville, KY
November 30, 2025*; 11:30 am, ESPN+		vs. Eastern Illinois; Louisville MTE	W 60–54	3–6	KFC Yum! Center; Louisville, KY
December 6, 2025*; 4:00 pm, ESPN+		Southern Indiana	L 41–56	3–7	Brooks Gymnasium (435); Johnson City, TN
December 11, 2025*; 7:00 pm, ESPN+		UNC Asheville	W 63–53	4–7	Brooks Gymnasium (263); Johnson City, TN
December 14, 2025*; 4:00 pm, ACCNX		at Virginia Tech	L 55−73	4−8	Cassell Coliseum (4,126); Blacksburg, VA
December 18, 2025*; 7:00 pm, ESPN+		Gardner–Webb	W 59–37	5–8	Brooks Gymnasium (359); Johnson City, TN
December 21, 2025*; 11:00 am, ESPN+		at Charlotte	W 51–50	6–8	Halton Arena (607); Charlotte, NC
January 2, 2026*; 7:00 pm, ESPN+		King	W 72–47	7–8	Brooks Gymnasium (508); Johnson City, TN
SoCon regular season
January 8, 2026; 7:00 pm, ESPN+		Furman	L 70–72	7–9 (0–1)	Brooks Gymnasium (477); Johnson City, TN
January 10, 2026; 1:30 pm, ESPN+		Wofford	L 57–61	7–10 (0–2)	Freedom Hall; Johnson City, TN
January 17, 2026; 4:00 pm, ESPN+		Chattanooga	L 41–53	7–11 (0–3)	Brooks Gymnasium (614); Johnson City, TN
January 22, 2026; 7:00 pm, ESPN+		at Western Carolina	W 62–50	8–11 (1–3)	Ramsey Center (537); Cullowhee, NC
January 24, 2026; 11:00 am, ESPN+		at UNC Greensboro	W 58–48	9–11 (2–3)	Bodford Arena (232); Greensboro, NC
January 30, 2026; 2:00 pm, ESPN+		Samford	W 53–44	10–11 (3–3)	Brooks Gymnasium (352); Johnson City, TN
February 5, 2026; 7:00 pm, ESPN+		at Wofford	W 61–57	11–11 (4–3)	Jerry Richardson Indoor Stadium (287); Spartanburg, SC
February 7, 2026; 2:00 pm, ESPN+		at Furman	W 58–55	12–11 (5–3)	Timmons Arena (947); Greenville, SC
February 10, 2026; 7:00 pm, ESPN+		Mercer	L 45–50	12–12 (5–4)	Brooks Gymnasium (365); Johnson City, TN
February 14, 2026; 2:00 pm, ESPN+		at Chattanooga	W 91–90 ^{2OT}	13–12 (6–4)	McKenzie Arena (1,653); Chattanooga, TN
February 19, 2026; 7:00 pm, ESPN+		UNC Greensboro	W 52–39	14–12 (7–4)	Brooks Gymnasium (1,073); Johnson City, TN
February 21, 2026; 4:00 pm, ESPN+		Western Carolina	W 61–51	15–12 (8–4)	Brooks Gymnasium; Johnson City, TN
February 26, 2026; 7:00 pm, ESPN+		at Mercer	W 58–51	16–12 (9–4)	Hawkins Arena (432); Macon, GA
February 28, 2026; 3:00 pm, ESPN+		at Samford	W 46–39	17–12 (10–4)	Pete Hanna Center (671); Homewood, AL
SoCon tournament
March 5, 2026; 1:15 pm, ESPN+	(2)	vs. (7) UNC Greensboro; Quarterfinals	W 62–50	18–12	Harrah's Cherokee Center; Asheville, NC
March 6, 2026; 1:15 pm, ESPN+	(2)	vs. (6) Samford; Semifinals	L 48–57	18–13	Harrah's Cherokee Center; Asheville, NC
*Non-conference game. ^{#}Rankings from AP Poll. (#) Tournament seedings in parentheses. All times are in Eastern.
