= 2025–26 Western Carolina Catamounts women's basketball team =

American college basketball season

2025–26 Western Carolina Catamounts women's basketball
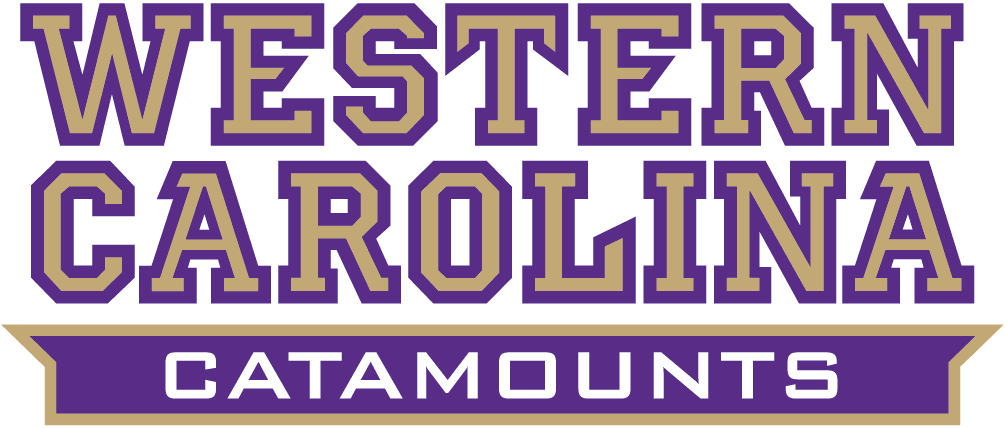
- Conference: Southern Conference
- Record: 3–26 (0–14 SoCon)
- Head coach: Jonathan Tsipis (2nd season)
- Associate head coach: Alison Seberger
- Assistant coaches: Darius Barksdale; Sydney Lowery; Claire Kaifes
- Home arena: Ramsey Center

2025–26 Southern Conference women's basketball standings
	Conf.				Overall
Team	W		L	PCT	W		L	PCT
Chattanooga	10	–	4	.714	20	–	11	.645
East Tennessee State	10	–	4	.714	18	–	13	.581
Wofford	10	–	4	.714	16	–	13	.552
Furman	9	–	5	.643	18	–	13	.581
Mercer	7	–	7	.500	17	–	13	.567
Samford †	6	–	8	.429	16	–	19	.457
UNC Greensboro	4	–	10	.286	14	–	16	.467
Western Carolina	0	–	14	.000	3	–	26	.103
† 2026 SoCon tournament winner

The 2025–26 Western Carolina Catamounts women's basketball team represented Western Carolina University during the 2025–26 NCAA Division I women's basketball season. The Catamounts, led by second-year head coach Jonathan Tsipis, played their home games at the Ramsey Center in Cullowhee, North Carolina as members of the Southern Conference (SoCon).

== Previous season ==
The Catamounts finished the 2024–25 season 13–17, 3–11 in SoCon play, to finish in a tie for seventh (last) place. They were defeated by top-seeded and eventual tournament champions UNC Greensboro in the quarterfinals of the SoCon tournament.

== Preseason ==
On October 1, 2025, the Southern Conference released their preseason poll. Western Carolina was picked to finish seventh in the conference.

=== Preseason rankings ===
SoCon Preseason Poll
Place	Team	Votes
1	Chattanooga	48 (6)
2	UNC Greensboro	39 (2)
3	East Tennessee State	38
4	Wofford	28
5	Furman	26
6	Samford	19
7	Western Carolina	14
8	Mercer	12
(#) first-place votes

=== Preseason All-SoCon Team ===
No players were named to the Preseason All-SoCon Team.

== Roster ==
2025–26 Western Carolina Catamounts women's basketball team
Players
Coaches

Pos.	#	Name	Height	Year	Previous school	Hometown
G	0	Tina Bowers	5 ft 8 in (1.73 m)	Fr	Western Alamance High School	Liberty, North Carolina
G	1	Ellie Richardson	5 ft 8 in (1.73 m)	Fr	Scottsburg Senior High School	Scottsburg, Indiana
G	2	Kehinde Obasuyi	5 ft 5 in (1.65 m)	RS Jr	Carrollton High School	Villa Rica, Georgia
G	4	Taj Hunter	5 ft 8 in (1.73 m)	RS Jr	Grayson High School	Atlanta, Georgia
G	5	Ally Hollifield	5 ft 7 in (1.7 m)	RS So	Memphis	Shelby, North Carolina
F	8	Ary Dizon	6 ft 1 in (1.85 m)	GS	Cal State Bakersfield	Tampa, Florida
G	10	Betsey Burnett	5 ft 8 in (1.73 m)	Jr	Johnson C. Smith	Charlotte, North Carolina
F	11	Riley Price	6 ft 3 in (1.91 m)	Fr	Blacksburg High School	Blacksburg, Virginia
F	21	Joyce Mulumba	6 ft 0 in (1.83 m)	Jr	Sacramento City College	Patterson, California
F	22	Ellie Fyans	6 ft 4 in (1.93 m)	Fr	Providence Day School	Weddington, North Carolina
F	24	Justice Zimmerman	5 ft 10 in (1.78 m)	Fr	NCGBB Academy	Chapel Hill, North Carolina
F/C	25	Kennedy Hilsenroth	6 ft 1 in (1.85 m)	So	Northwest Cabarrus High School	Concord, North Carolina
C	33	Grace Pack	6 ft 2 in (1.88 m)	Sr	Gardner–Webb	Richmond, Virginia

Head coach

- Jonathan Tsipis (North Carolina)

Assistant coach(es)

- Alison Seberger (Illinois State)
- Darius Barksdale (Urbana)
- Sydney Lowery (Boston College)
- Claire Kaifes (Marquette)

Legend

- (C) Team captain
- (S) Suspended
- (I) Ineligible
- (W) Walk-on
- Injured
- Current redshirt

Roster
Last update: August 10, 2026

== Schedule and results ==
Date time, TV	Rank^{#}	Opponent^{#}	Result	Record	Site (attendance) city, state
Non-conference regular season
November 6, 2025*; 6:00 pm, ESPN+		Virginia–Lynchburg	W 99–58	1–0	Ramsey Center (415); Cullowhee, NC
November 9, 2025*; 2:00 pm, ESPN+		Tusculum	W 86–45	2–0	Ramsey Center (376); Cullowhee, NC
November 12, 2025*; 7:00 pm, FloCollege		at Campbell	L 54–66	2–1	Gore Arena (723); Buies Creek, NC
November 16, 2025*; 3:30 pm, Nexstar/ESPN+		No. 6 Oklahoma	L 32–95	2–2	Ramsey Center (1,575); Cullowhee, NC
November 19, 2025*; 5:00 pm, ESPN+		UNC Asheville	L 50−67	2−3	Ramsey Center (802); Cullowhee, NC
November 23, 2025*; 1:00 pm, ACCNX		at Wake Forest	L 49−60	2−4	LJVM Coliseum (1,191); Winston-Salem, NC
November 25, 2025*; 2:00 pm, ESPN+		at West Georgia	L 60–69	2–5	The Coliseum (287); Carrollton, GA
November 28, 2025*; 4:00 pm, FloCollege		vs. Clemson; Nassau Championship Junkanoo Division semifinals	L 44–77	2–6	Baha Mar Convention Center (247); Nassau, Bahamas
November 30, 2025*; 4:00 pm, FloCollege		vs. Temple; Nassau Championship Junkanoo Division consolation	L 64–84	2–7	Baha Mar Convention Center (247); Nassau, Bahamas
December 3, 2025*; 11:00 am, ESPN+		USC Upstate	L 44–55	2–8	Ramsey Center (1,891); Cullowhee, NC
December 7, 2025*; 2:00 pm, ESPN+		Queens	L 64–71	2–9	Ramsey Center (641); Cullowhee, NC
December 13, 2025*; 2:00 pm, ESPN+		at Gardner–Webb	L 62−77	2−10	Paul Porter Arena (345); Boiling Springs, NC
December 21, 2025*; 1:00 pm, B1G+		at Indiana	L 44–71	2–11	Simon Skjodt Assembly Hall (7,875); Bloomington, IN
December 30, 2025*; 2:00 pm, ESPN+		Montreat	W 91–44	3–11	Ramsey Center (654); Cullowhee, NC
January 3, 2026*; 2:00 pm		SC Central Christian; Exhibition	W 92–16	–	Ramsey Center; Cullowhee, NC
SoCon regular season
January 8, 2026; 6:00 pm, ESPN+		Mercer	L 75–84	3–12 (0–1)	Ramsey Center (527); Cullowhee, NC
January 10, 2026; 2:00 pm, ESPN+		Samford	L 62–73	3–13 (0–2)	Ramsey Center (622); Cullowhee, NC
January 15, 2026; 6:00 pm, ESPN+		at Wofford	L 65–71	3–14 (0–3)	Jerry Richardson Indoor Stadium (320); Spartanburg, SC
January 17, 2026; 2:00 pm, ESPN+		at Furman	L 38–69	3–15 (0–4)	Timmons Arena (509); Greenville, SC
January 22, 2026; 7:00 pm, ESPN+		East Tennessee State	L 50–62	3–16 (0–5)	Ramsey Center (537); Cullowhee, NC
January 24, 2026; 11:00 am, ESPN+		Chattanooga	L 52–61	3–17 (0–6)	Ramsey Center (697); Cullowhee, NC
February 1, 2026; 2:00 pm, ESPN+		at UNC Greensboro	L 46–55	3–18 (0–7)	Bodford Arena (152); Greensboro, NC
February 5, 2026; 5:00 pm, ESPN+		at Samford	L 50–73	3–19 (0–8)	Pete Hanna Center (273); Homewood, AL
February 7, 2026; 2:00 pm, ESPN+		at Mercer	L 51–61	3–20 (0–9)	Hawkins Arena (425); Macon, GA
February 12, 2026; 6:00 pm, Nexstar/ESPN+		Furman	L 51–60	3–21 (0–10)	Ramsey Center (684); Cullowhee, NC
February 14, 2026; 2:00 pm, ESPN+/ETV		Wofford	L 54–73	3–22 (0–11)	Ramsey Center (563); Cullowhee, NC
February 19, 2026; 6:00 pm, ESPN+		at Chattanooga	L 36–52	3–23 (0–12)	McKenzie Arena (1,332); Chattanooga, TN
February 21, 2026; 4:00 pm, ESPN+		at East Tennessee State	L 51–61	3–24 (0–13)	Brooks Gymnasium; Johnson City, TN
February 28, 2026; 3:00 pm, ESPN+		UNC Greensboro	L 54–68	3–25 (0–14)	Ramsey Center (980); Cullowhee, NC
SoCon tournament
March 5, 2026; 11:00 am, ESPN+	(8)	vs. (1) Chattanooga; Quarterfinals	L 47–66	3–26	Harrah's Cherokee Center; Asheville, NC
*Non-conference game. ^{#}Rankings from AP Poll. (#) Tournament seedings in parentheses. All times are in Eastern.
