= 2025–26 UNC Greensboro Spartans women's basketball team =

American college basketball season

2025–26 UNC Greensboro Spartans women's basketball
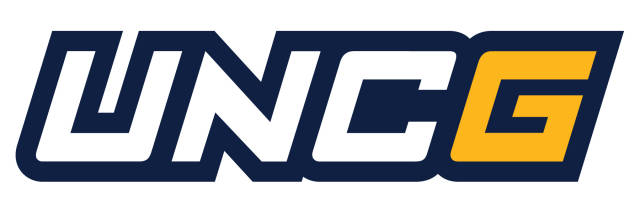
- Conference: Southern Conference
- Record: 14–16 (4–10 SoCon)
- Head coach: Trina Patterson (10th season)
- Associate head coach: Cetera DeGraffenreid
- Assistant coaches: Alex Miller; Fred Applin; Letoya McBride; Ashley Yu
- Home arena: Bodford Arena

2025–26 Southern Conference women's basketball standings
	Conf.				Overall
Team	W		L	PCT	W		L	PCT
Chattanooga	10	–	4	.714	20	–	11	.645
East Tennessee State	10	–	4	.714	18	–	13	.581
Wofford	10	–	4	.714	16	–	13	.552
Furman	9	–	5	.643	18	–	13	.581
Mercer	7	–	7	.500	17	–	13	.567
Samford †	6	–	8	.429	16	–	19	.457
UNC Greensboro	4	–	10	.286	14	–	16	.467
Western Carolina	0	–	14	.000	3	–	26	.103
† 2026 SoCon tournament winner

The 2025–26 UNC Greensboro Spartans women's basketball team represented the University of North Carolina at Greensboro during the 2025–26 NCAA Division I women's basketball season. The Spartans, led by tenth-year head coach Trina Patterson, played their home games at Bodford Arena in Greensboro, North Carolina, as members of the Southern Conference (SoCon).

== Previous season ==
The Spartans finished the 2024–25 season 25–7, 13–1 in SoCon play, to finish in as SoCon regular season champions. They defeated Western Carolina, Wofford, and Chattanooga in the SoCon tournament championship game, sending the Spartans to just their second ever NCAA tournament appearance, and the first since 1998. In the tournament, they would receive the No. 16 seed in the Spokane Regional 4, where they would be defeated by the No. 1 seed USC in the First Round.

== Preseason ==
On October 1, 2025, the Southern Conference released their preseason poll. UNC Greensboro was picked to finish second in the conference, receiving two out of a possible eight first-place votes.

=== Preseason rankings ===
SoCon Preseason Poll
Place	Team	Votes
1	Chattanooga	48 (6)
2	UNC Greensboro	39 (2)
3	East Tennessee State	38
4	Wofford	28
5	Furman	26
6	Samford	19
7	Western Carolina	14
8	Mercer	12
(#) first-place votes

=== Preseason All-SoCon Team ===
Preseason All-SoCon Team
Player	Year	Position
Makiah Asidanya	Junior	Guard
Jaila Lee	Senior	Guard

== Roster ==
2025–26 UNC Greensboro Spartans women's basketball team
Players
Coaches

Pos.	#	Name	Height	Year	Previous school	Hometown
G	0	Leyla Minor	6 ft 0 in (1.83 m)	Fr	DME Academy	Virginia Beach, Virginia
G	1	Jeni Levine	5 ft 7 in (1.7 m)	GS	USC Upstate	Vinton, Virginia
G	2	Tasia Johnson	5 ft 7 in (1.7 m)	Sr	Daytona State	Greenwood, Missouri
G	4	Jaila Lee	5 ft 10 in (1.78 m)	Sr	UNC Asheville	Brentwood, Tennessee
F	5	Ella Pierre-Louis	5 ft 11 in (1.8 m)	Fr	NC Good Better Best Academy	Providence, Rhode Island
F	6	Kristina Rakotobe	6 ft 1 in (1.85 m)	So	Virginia Academy	Antananarivo, Madagascar
F	7	Salimata Traore	6 ft 1 in (1.85 m)	Fr	Cégep de Thetford	Paris, France
G	12	Ciara Harris	5 ft 8 in (1.73 m)	So	Oklahoma Christian	McKinney, Texas
G	13	Joelle Davis	5 ft 10 in (1.78 m)	Jr	Durham Academy	Durham, North Carolina
F	15	Rylan Moffitt	6 ft 0 in (1.83 m)	Sr	Appalachian State	Bushnell, Florida
G	22	Makiah Asidanya	5 ft 7 in (1.7 m)	Jr	Salesian College Preparatory	Pittsburg, California
F	32	Danaya Stokes	6 ft 0 in (1.83 m)	Fr	The Galloway School	Austell, Georgia
G	45	Mia Simpson	5 ft 7 in (1.7 m)	Sr	Indiana State	Waukegan, Illinois

Head coach

- Trina Patterson (Virginia)

Assistant coach(es)

- Cetera DeGraffenreid (North Carolina)
- Alex Miller (North Carolina)
- Fred Applin (Elon)
- Letoya McBride (Gardner–Webb)
- Ashley Yu (Hunter)

Legend

- (C) Team captain
- (S) Suspended
- (I) Ineligible
- (W) Walk-on
- Injured
- Current redshirt

Roster
Last update: August 8, 2026

== Schedule and results ==
Date time, TV	Rank^{#}	Opponent^{#}	Result	Record	Site (attendance) city, state
Non-conference regular season
November 3, 2025*; 10:00 pm, ACCNX		at Stanford	L 42–87	0–1	Maples Pavilion (2,068); Stanford, CA
November 5, 2025*; 7:30 pm, ESPN+		at San Francisco	L 40–64	0–2	Sobrato Center (248); San Francisco, CA
November 10, 2025*; 7:00 pm, SECN+		at Auburn	L 57–64	0–3	Neville Arena (2,832); Auburn, AL
November 14, 2025*; 6:00 pm, ESPN+		at Presbyterian	W 57–53	1–3	Templeton Center (103); Clinton, SC
November 21, 2025*; 7:00 pm, ESPN+		Gardner–Webb	W 54−52	2−3	Bodford Arena (538); Greensboro, NC
November 23, 2025*; 6:00 pm, ACCN		at No. 14 North Carolina	L 48−94	2−4	Carmichael Arena (2,418); Chapel Hill, NC
November 26, 2025*; 11:00 am		at North Carolina Central	W 54–47	3–4	McDougald–McLendon Arena (163); Durham, NC
December 2, 2025*; 11:00 am, ESPN+		Columbia College	W 96–25	4–4	Bodford Arena (1,052); Greensboro, NC
December 6, 2025*; 4:30 pm, ESPN+		at USC Upstate	W 70–39	5–4	G. B. Hodge Center (230); Spartanburg, SC
December 10, 2025*; 6:00 pm, ESPN+		at Coastal Carolina	L 61–67	5–5	HTC Center (589); Conway, SC
December 13, 2025*; 2:00 pm, ESPN+		Bob Jones	W 119–35	6–5	Bodford Arena (354); Greensboro, NC
December 17, 2025*; 7:00 pm, ESPN+		Elon	W 54−50	7−5	Bodford Arena (172); Greensboro, NC
December 22, 2025*; 2:00 pm, ESPN+		South Carolina State	W 77–32	8–5	Bodford Arena (174); Greensboro, NC
January 1, 2026*; 1:00 pm, ESPN+		Carolina	W 114–35	9–5	Bodford Arena (198); Greensboro, NC
January 3, 2026*; 1:00 pm, ESPN+		Livingstone	W 94–39	10–5	Bodford Arena (208); Greensboro, NC
SoCon regular season
January 8, 2026; 7:00 pm, ESPN+		Samford	W 73–64	11–5 (1–0)	Bodford Arena (162); Greensboro, NC
January 10, 2026; 2:00 pm, ESPN+		Mercer	W 76–59	12–5 (2–0)	Bodford Arena (252); Greensboro, NC
January 15, 2026; 7:00 pm, ESPN+		at Furman	L 56–69	12–6 (2–1)	Timmons Arena (317); Greenville, SC
January 17, 2026; 2:00 pm, ESPN+		at Wofford	L 59–61	12–7 (2–2)	Jerry Richardson Indoor Stadium (371); Spartanburg, SC
January 22, 2026; 6:00 pm, Nexstar/ESPN+		Chattanooga	L 40–52	12–8 (2–3)	Bodford Arena (541); Greensboro, NC
January 24, 2026; 11:00 am, ESPN+		East Tennessee State	L 48–58	12–9 (2–4)	Bodford Arena (232); Greensboro, NC
February 1, 2026; 2:00 pm, ESPN+		Western Carolina	W 55–46	13–9 (3–4)	Bodford Arena (152); Greensboro, NC
February 5, 2026; 7:00 pm, ESPN+		at Mercer	L 58–67	13–10 (3–5)	Hawkins Arena (362); Macon, GA
February 7, 2026; 3:00 pm, ESPN+		at Samford	L 64–68	13–11 (3–6)	Pete Hanna Center (311); Homewood, AL
February 12, 2026; 7:00 pm, ESPN+		Wofford	L 38–51	13–12 (3–7)	Bodford Arena (462); Greensboro, NC
February 14, 2026; 2:00 pm, ESPN+		Furman	L 61–63	13–13 (3–8)	Bodford Arena (422); Greensboro, NC
February 19, 2026; 7:00 pm, ESPN+		at East Tennessee State	L 39–52	13–14 (3–9)	Brooks Gymnasium (1,073); Johnson City, TN
February 21, 2026; 2:00 pm, ESPN+		at Chattanooga	L 54–56	13–15 (3–10)	McKenzie Arena (1,632); Chattanooga, TN
February 28, 2026; 3:00 pm, ESPN+		at Western Carolina	W 68–54	14–15 (4–10)	Ramsey Center (980); Cullowhee, NC
SoCon tournament
March 5, 2026; 1:15 pm, ESPN+	(7)	vs. (2) East Tennessee State; Quarterfinals	L 50–62	14–16	Harrah's Cherokee Center; Asheville, NC
*Non-conference game. ^{#}Rankings from AP Poll. (#) Tournament seedings in parentheses. All times are in Eastern.
