= Legacy Ranch High School (Liberty Hill, Texas) =

Location
- Liberty Hill, Texas 78642; United States
- 30.67212°N 97.87431°W

Information
- School type: Public high school
- Established: 2024
- School district: Liberty Hill Independent School District
- Principal: Mark Koller
- Enrollment: 1,576 (2026)
- Colors: Columbia Blue & Navy
- Athletics conference: UIL Class 5A
- Mascot: Wrangler
- Website: Official Website

Legacy Ranch High School is a public high school located in Liberty Hill, Texas, and classified as a 5A school by the University Interscholastic League. It is part of the Liberty Hill Independent School District in Western Williamson County. It is set to open in August 2026, with an initial enrollment of 1,576.
