= Liberty Hill Independent School District =

School district in Texas, United States

Address
- 301 Forrest Street Liberty Hill, Texas, 78642; United States

District information
- Grades: PK–12
- Schools: 11
- NCES District ID: 4827420

Students and staff
- Students: 8,829 (2023–2024)
- Teachers: 590.23 (on an FTE basis)
- Student–teacher ratio: 14.96:1

Other information
- Website: www.libertyhill.txed.net

Liberty Hill Independent School District is a 5A public school district based in Liberty Hill, Texas, United States. Their mascot is a panther.

In 2009, the school district was rated "recognized" by the Texas Education Agency.

== Schools ==
High schools (grades 9-12)
Name	Established	Mascot	Colors	Additional information
Legacy Ranch High School	2024	Wranglers	Columbia, Navy, & Gold	Located at future LRMS campus from 2024-26; moved into permanent LRHS facility in 2026
Liberty Hill High School	1986	Panthers	Purple & Gold	Current campus opened in 2013; former campuses opened in 1986, 2000

Middle schools (grades 6-8)
Name	Established	Mascot	Colors	Additional information
Legacy Ranch Middle School	2026	Wranglers	Columbia, Navy, & Gold	Campus hosted LRHS for 2 years before LRMS opened
Liberty Hill Middle School	2013	Panthers	Purple & Gold	
Santa Rita Middle School	2021	Stallions	Purple & Black	

Primary schools (grades PK-5)
Name	Grades	Established	Mascot	Colors	Additional information
Bar W Elementary School	K-5	2023	Wranglers	Columbia, Navy, & Gold	
Bill Burden Elementary School	K-5	2006	Panthers	Purple & Gold	
Lariat Trails Elementary School	K-5	2026	Panthers	Purple & Gold	Capacity of 1000 students
Liberty Hill Elementary School	K-5	1979	Panthers	Purple & Gold	
Louine Noble Elementary School	PK-5	2021	Panthers	Purple & Gold	Hosts all LHISD PK students in 2026-27 and will realigned to PK-only in 2027
Rancho Sienna Elementary School	K-5	2017	Wranglers	Columbia, Navy, & Gold	Located in Georgetown, TX
Santa Rita Elementary School	K-5	2020	Wranglers	Columbia, Navy, & Gold	
Tierra Rosa Elementary School	K-5	2024	Wranglers	Columbia, Navy, & Gold	

Future schools (grades 6-8)
Name	Projected opening	Additional information
Saddleback Elementary School	2027	Capacity of 1000 students
Middle School #4	2031	
High School #3	2033	
Elementary School #10	2035	

== Future Schools ==
- Saddleback Elementary (opening 2027)
- Elementary No. 10 (opening 2031)
- Elementary School No. 11 (opening 2033)
- Middle School No. 4 (opening 2030)
- High School No. 3 (opening 2032)

== Superintendents. ==
- 2026-Present- Travis Motal
- 2019-2025- Steven Snell
- 2012-2018- Dr. Rob Hart
