= 2026 Southern Conference women's basketball tournament =

American college basketball tournament

- Classification: Division I
- Season: 2025–26
- Teams: 8
- Site: Harrah's Cherokee Center; Asheville, North Carolina
- Champions: Samford (4th title)
- Winning coach: Matt Wise (1st title)
- Television: Nexstar, ESPN+, ESPNU

2025–26 Southern Conference women's basketball standings
	Conf.				Overall
Team	W		L	PCT	W		L	PCT
Chattanooga	10	–	4	.714	20	–	11	.645
East Tennessee State	10	–	4	.714	18	–	13	.581
Wofford	10	–	4	.714	16	–	13	.552
Furman	9	–	5	.643	18	–	13	.581
Mercer	7	–	7	.500	17	–	13	.567
Samford †	6	–	8	.429	16	–	19	.457
UNC Greensboro	4	–	10	.286	14	–	16	.467
Western Carolina	0	–	14	.000	3	–	26	.103
† 2026 SoCon tournament winner

The 2026 Southern Conference women's Basketball tournament took place March 5–8, 2026, at the Harrah's Cherokee Center in Asheville, North Carolina. Samford earned the conference's automatic bid to the 2026 NCAA Division I women's basketball tournament.

== Seeds ==
The teams were seeded by record within the conference games that were played, with a tiebreaker system to seed teams with identical conference records.

Seed	School	Conf	Overall	Tiebreaker
#1	Chattanooga	10−4	18−9	2−0 vs. Furman
#2	East Tennessee State	10−4	17−12	1−1 vs. Furman
#3	Wofford	10−4	16−12	0−2 vs. Furman
#4	Furman	9−5	17−12	
#5	Mercer	7−7	17−12	
#6	Samford	6−8	13−18	
#7	UNC Greensboro	4−10	14−15	
#8	Western Carolina	0−14	3−25	

== Schedule ==
All tournament games are streamed on ESPN+. The championship will be televised across the region on select Nexstar stations and simulcast on ESPNU.

Session	Game	Time	Matchup	Score	Television
Quarterfinals – Thursday, March 5
1	1	11:00 AM	No. 1 Chattanooga vs. No. 8 Western Carolina	66−47	ESPN+
1	2	1:15 PM	No. 2 East Tennessee State vs. No. 7 UNC Greensboro	62−50	ESPN+
2	3	3:30 PM	No. 3 Wofford vs. No. 6 Samford	57−59	ESPN+
2	4	5:45 PM	No. 4 Furman vs. No. 5 Mercer	66−45	ESPN+
Semifinals – Friday, March 6
3	5	11:00 AM	No. 1 Chattanooga vs. No. 4 Furman	76−65	ESPN+
3	6	1:15 PM	No. 2 East Tennessee State vs. No. 6 Samford	48−57	ESPN+
Championship Game – Sunday, March 8
4	7	12:00 PM	No. 1 Chattanooga vs. No. 6 Samford	67−72	ESPNU
Game times in Eastern Time. Rankings denote tournament seeding.

== Bracket ==
Quarterfinals; Thursday, March 5 ESPN+
1	Chattanooga	66
8	Western Carolina	47
4	Furman	66
5	Mercer	45
2	East Tennessee State	62
7	UNC Greensboro	50
3	Wofford	57
6	Samford	59

Semifinals; Friday, March 6 ESPN+
1	Chattanooga	76
4	Furman	65
2	East Tennessee State	48
6	Samford	57

Championship Game; Sunday, March 8 ESPNU
1	Chattanooga	67
6	Samford	72

Game times are in Eastern Time.
Rankings denote tournament seed.
Source: Southern Conference

== See also ==
- 2026 Southern Conference men's basketball tournament
