= Pearl A. Neas =

American college administrator

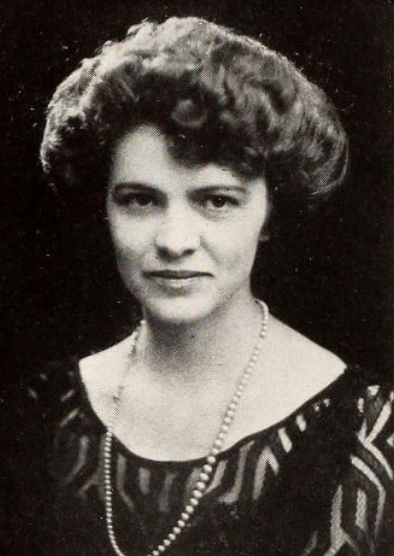
- Pearl A. Neas, from the 1923 yearbook of Southwestern University
- Born: 1893; Liberty Hill, Texas
- Died: July 3, 1962 (aged 68–69); Georgetown, Texas
- Occupation: College administrator

Pearl Alma Neas (1893 – July 3, 1962) was an American college administrator and clubwoman. She was the registrar of Southwestern University in Texas from 1923 to 1962.

== Early life and education ==
Neas was born in Liberty Hill, Texas, the daughter of Isaac Neas and Hester Idella Ottinger Neas. She graduated from Tyler Business College, and attended Southwestern University as a young woman, and throughout her life.

== Career ==
Neas began working at Southwestern University in 1913, as secretary to the school's president. She became assistant registrar in 1917, and registrar in 1923, a position she held for almost forty years. Neas was also the school's director of publicity in the 1930s, director of the school's extension service, and wrote a brief history of the school. She was one of the three founders of the Texas Association of Collegiate Registrars. In 1953, Neas was named to the Texas state advisory commission on school accreditation.

Neas was a delegate to Democratic National Conventions. She campaigned for Lyndon B. Johnson, and frequently corresponded with Johnson and his wife, Lady Bird, to bring federal investment to Texas.

Neas was a founder of the Georgetown Business Women's League, and president of the League from 1928 to 1929. In 1954, she was named president of the Business and Professional Women's Club of Georgetown. Neas was active at the state level in the Texas Federation of Women's Clubs, and was a trustee of the Texas Fine Arts Association. She was named Woman of the Year in 1956, by the Georgetown Business Women's League. Neas was also active in Methodist church work, especially in the denomination's Wesleyan Service Guilds. She was national scholarship chair for the Zeta Tau Alpha sorority.

== Personal life ==
Neas died in 1962, in Georgetown. Her memorial service was held in the campus chapel. Her papers, including scrapbooks, football programs, and her correspondence with the Johnsons, are in the collection of Southwestern University Libraries.
