= Brenda Mock Brown =

American women's college basketball coach

Current position
- Title: Head coach
- Team: East Tennessee State
- Conference: SoCon
- Record: 78–48 (.619)

Biographical details
- Born: June 21, 1978 (age 48); Waynesville, North Carolina, U.S.

Playing career
- 1998–2001: Wake Forest

Coaching career (HC unless noted)
- 2002–2004: Georgia Tech (Asst.)
- 2004–2006: Charlotte (Asst.)
- 2006–2012: Florida (Asst.)
- 2012–2020: UNC Asheville
- 2022–present: East Tennessee State

Head coaching record
- Overall: 195–185 (.513)

Brenda Mock Kirkpatrick Brown (born June 21, 1978) is an American college basketball coach. Since 2022, she has been the head coach for the East Tennessee State Buccaneers women's basketball team.

== Career ==
She was previously the head coach of the University of North Carolina at Asheville women's basketball team from 2012 to 2020. Brenda, now going by her married name, Mock Brown, was named head coach at East Tennessee State on August 8, 2022.

As a student-athlete, Mock graduated from Tuscola High School in 1996. She went on to obtain a Bachelor of Arts degree in history and sociology in 2000 and a Master of Arts in education in 2001 from Wake Forest University, while playing for the Demon Deacons.

== Head coaching record ==
Record table
Season	Team	Overall	Conference	Standing	Postseason
UNC Asheville (Big South Conference) (2012–2020)
2012–13	UNCA	2–28	0–18	11th	
2013–14	UNCA	11–20	7–13	8th	
2014–15	UNCA	9–22	7–13	8th	
2015–16	UNCA	26–7	16–4	1st	NCAA 1st Round
2016–17	UNCA	19–15	9–9	7th	NCAA 1st Round
2017–18	UNCA	17–16	12–6	3rd	WBI 1st Round
2018–19	UNCA	17–15	11–7	4th	
2019–20	UNCA	16–14	11–7	6th	
UNC Asheville:		117–137 (.461)	56–66 (.459)		
East Tennessee State (Southern Conference) (2022–present)
2022–23	ETSU	25–10	9–5	T–2nd	WBI 3rd place
2023–24	ETSU	18–12	7–7	5th	
2024–25	ETSU	17–13	8–6	T–3rd	
2025–26	ETSU	18–13	10–4	T–1st	
ETSU:		78–48 (.619)	34–22 (.607)		
Total:		195–185 (.513)			
National champion Postseason invitational champion Conference regular season champion Conference regular season and conference tournament champion Division regular season champion Division regular season and conference tournament champion Conference tournament champion
