= Liberty Hill High School =

Public high school in Williamson County, Texas, United States

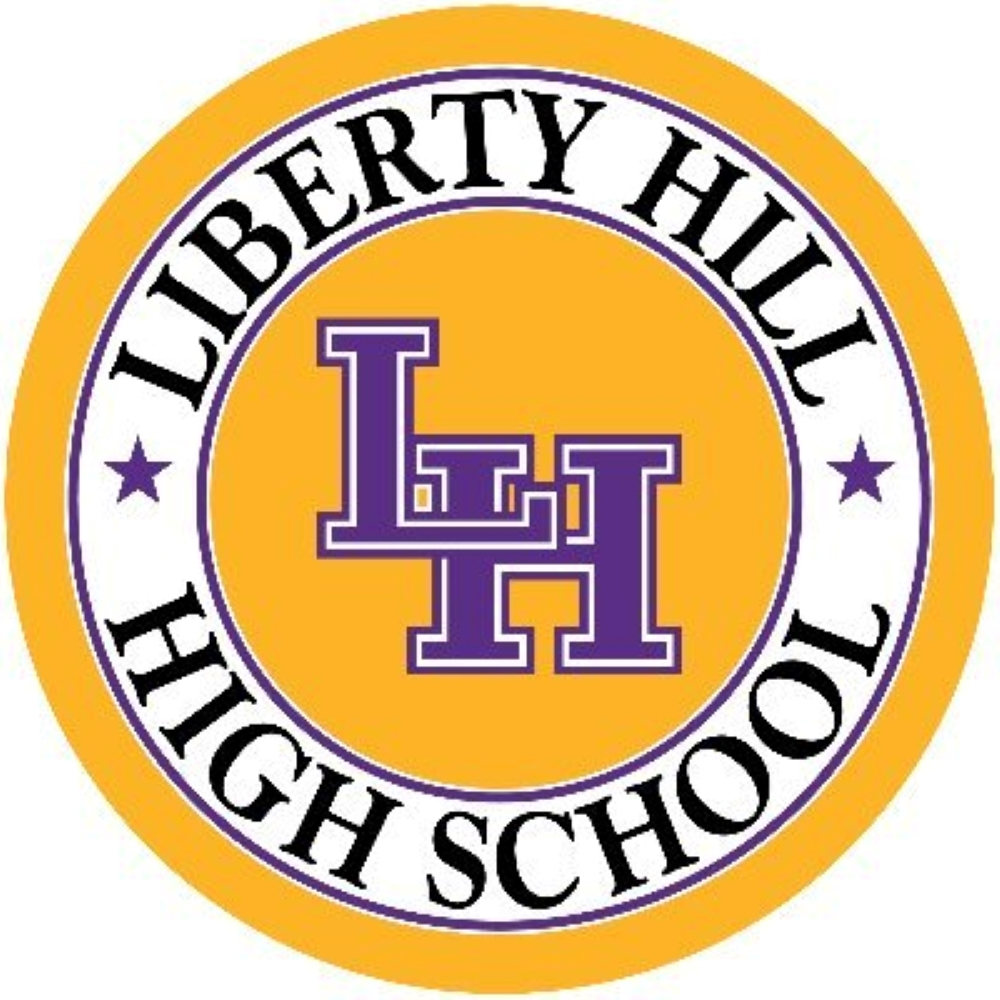

Location
- 16500 West State Hwy 29; Liberty Hill, Texas 78642; United States; 30.6825°N 97.9540°W

Information
- School type: Public
- School district: Liberty Hill Independent School District
- Principal: Bryon Ellison
- Staff: 128.47 (on FTE basis)
- Grades: 9-12
- Enrollment: 1,739 (2025-2026)
- Student to teacher ratio: 17.23
- Colors: Purple and gold
- Athletics conference: UIL Class 5A
- Mascot: Panther
- Website: lhhs.lhisd.org

Liberty Hill High School is a public high school serving students grades 9–12 located in Williamson County, Texas, United States, 3/4 of a mile from Liberty Hill and 30 miles northwest of Austin. It is attended by students residing in the city of Liberty Hill, although students also reside in unincorporated areas of Williamson County. It is one of the three secondary schools and first high school within the Liberty Hill Independent School District. It is part of UIL region 5A. In 2022, the school received a "B" rating from the Texas Education Agency.

== Athletics ==
The Liberty Hill Panthers participate in the following sports:

- Baseball
- Basketball
- Cross country
- Football
- Golf
- Powerlifting
- Softball
- Swimming
- Tennis
- Track and field
- Volleyball

=== State titles ===
- Football
  - Championships
    - 2006 (3A)
    - 2007 (3A)
  - Finalists:
    - 2018 (4A)
    - 2021 (5A)
  - Semifinalists:
    - 2022 (5A)
- Boys Soccer
  - Championships
    - 2025 (5A D2) (Note: Liberty Hill lost the state championship game to Highland Park High School. However, Highland Park's win was later vacated for the use of an ineligible player, crowning Liberty Hill as state champions.)
- Volleyball -
  - Semifinalists:
    - 2023 (5A)
- Basketball -
  - Finalists:
    - 2019 (4A)

== Notable alumni ==
- J. E. Hickman (1899), former Justice of the Supreme Court of Texas
- Pee Wee Crayton (1933), R&B and Blues musician
- Sedona Prince (2018), basketball player for the TCU Horned Frogs
- Mason Shipley (2020), professional football kicker
- Connor Hawkins (2024), college football kicker for the Ohio State Buckeyes
