= East Tennessee State Buccaneers women's basketball =

2025–26 East Tennessee State Buccaneers women's basketball team
- University: East Tennessee State University
- Head coach: Brenda Mock Brown (4th season)
- Location: Johnson City, Tennessee
- Arena: J. Madison Brooks Gymnasium (capacity: 2,500)
- Conference: SoCon
- Nickname: Buccaneers
- Colors: Navy blue and gold

NCAA Division I tournament appearances
- 2008, 2009, 2010

Conference tournament champions
- 2008, 2009, 2010

Conference regular-season champions
- 1995, 2008, 2010, 2026

Uniforms
Home	Away	Alternate

The East Tennessee State Buccaneers women's basketball team represents East Tennessee State University (ETSU) in Johnson City, Tennessee. ETSU currently competes in the Southern Conference.

== History ==
The Buccaneers began play in 1968. As of the end of the 2016–17 season, they have a 617–649 all-time record. From 1978 to 2005, they played in the Southern Conference. From 2005 to 2014, they played in the Atlantic Sun Conference, winning three conference tournament titles and two regular season titles. In the three NCAA Tournaments they have appeared in, they lost in the first round each time. They have also made appearances in the NWIT/WNIT in 1994, 2006 and 2014.

== NCAA tournament results ==
The Buccaneers have appeared in three NCAA Tournaments, with a combined record of 0–3.

Year	Seed	Round	Opponent	Result
2008	#14	First Round	#3 Oklahoma State	L 63–75
2009	#13	First Round	#4 Iowa State	L 53–85
2010	#14	First Round	#3 Xavier	L 82–94
