= Western Carolina Catamounts women's basketball =

American college basketball program

| 2025–26 Western Carolina Catamounts women's basketball team |
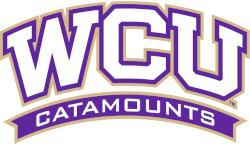
- University: Western Carolina University
- Head coach: Jonathan Tsipis (2nd season)
- Location: Cullowhee, North Carolina
- Arena: Ramsey Center (capacity: 7,826)
- Conference: SoCon
- Nickname: Catamounts
- Colors: Purple and gold

NCAA Division I tournament appearances
- 2005, 2009

Conference tournament champions
- 2005, 2009

Conference regular-season champions
- 2007

The Western Carolina Catamounts women's basketball team is the basketball team that represents Western Carolina University in Cullowhee, North Carolina, United States. The school's team currently competes in the Southern Conference.

== History ==
The Catamonts began play in 1965. They joined Division I in 1981. In their two NCAA Tournament appearances, they have lost in the First Round both times. In 2005, they lost 94–43 to Tennessee. In 2009, they lost 73–44 to Vanderbilt. In 2007, they were invited to the WNIT after winning a share of the regular season title with Chattanooga, where they lost 74–64 to Virginia Tech in Round 2.

== NCAA tournament results ==
The Catamounts have appeared in two NCAA Tournaments, with a combined record of 0–2.

| Year | Seed | Round | Opponent | Result |
|---|---|---|---|---|
| 2005 | #16 | First Round | #1 Tennessee | L 43-94 |
| 2009 | #13 | First Round | #4 Vanderbilt | L 44-73 |
