= Wofford Terriers women's basketball =

Women's college basketball team

2026–27 Wofford Terriers women's basketball team
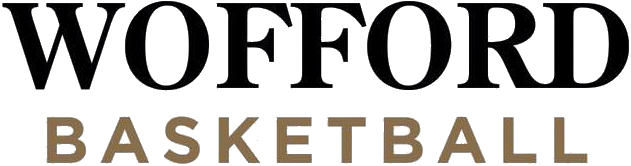
- University: Wofford College
- First season: 1980; 46 years ago
- Head coach: Jimmy Garrity (11th season)
- Location: Spartanburg, South Carolina
- Arena: Jerry Richardson Indoor Stadium (capacity: 3,300)
- Conference: SoCon
- Nickname: Terriers
- Colors: Old gold and black

Conference regular-season champions
- 2023, 2026

Uniforms
Home	Away	Alternate

The Wofford Terriers women's basketball team represents Wofford College in Spartanburg, South Carolina, United States, in Division I of the NCAA. The school's team competes in the Southern Conference.

== History ==
Wofford began play in the 1980–81 season. They have played in the Southern Conference since 1995 after two years of transition to Division I. As of the end of the 2015–16 season, the Terriers have an all-time record of 354–633. They have never reached the NCAA Tournament nor the WNIT.
