= Liberty Hill, Texas =

City in Williamson County, Texas, United States

- City
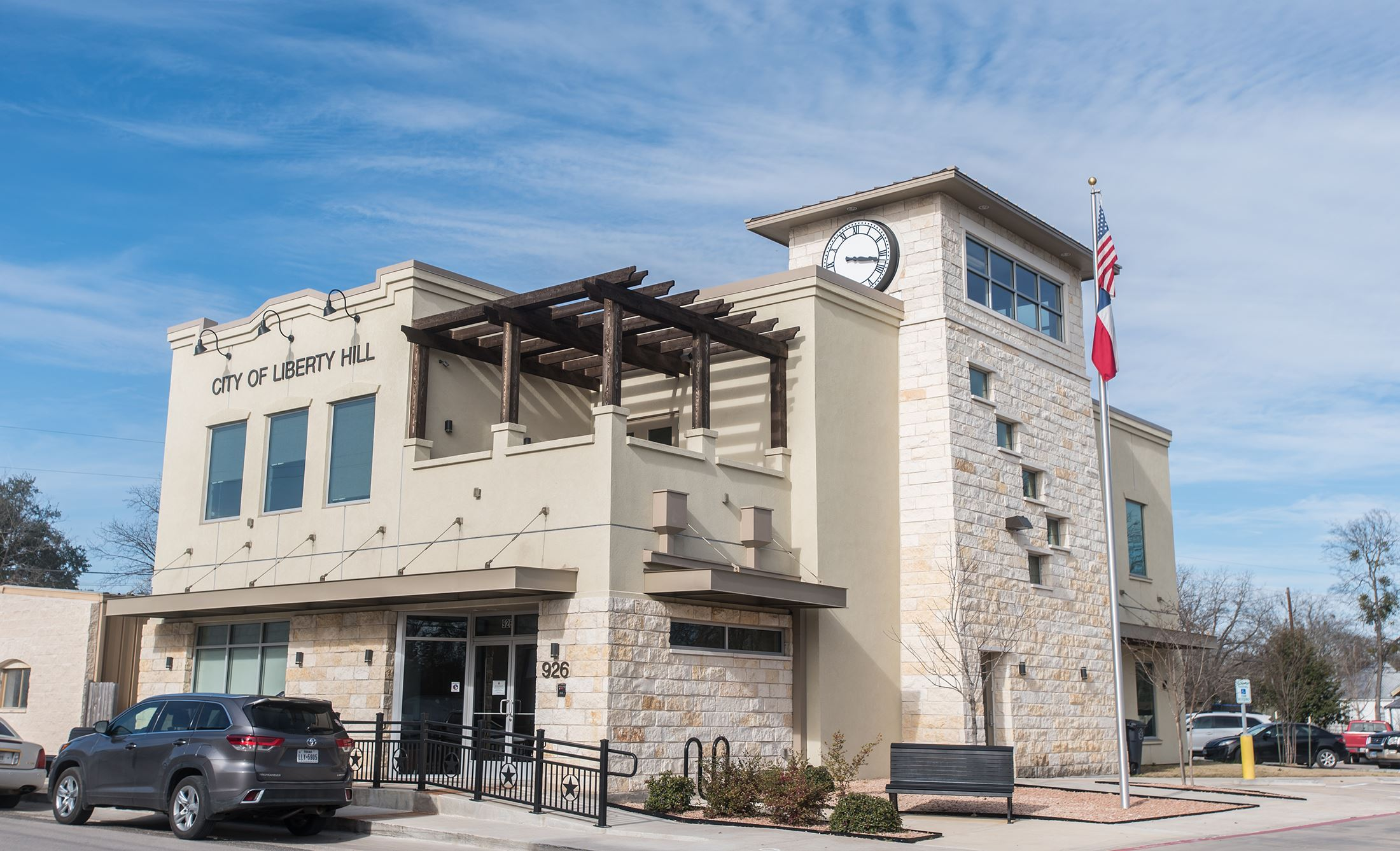
- Downtown Liberty Hill

- Location of Liberty Hill in Williamson County, Texas
- Coordinates: 30°39′20″N 97°54′50″W
- Country: United States
- State: Texas
- County: Williamson
- Founded: 1840s
- Incorporated: 1999

Government
  - Type: Council-Manager
  - Mayor: Crystal Mancilla
  - Mayor Pro Tem: Amanda Young
  - Councilmember: Jacquetta Thayer; Michael Helbing; Diane Williams; Wade Ashley

Area
  - Total: 4.637 sq mi (12.010 km^{2})
  - Land: 4.634 sq mi (12.001 km^{2})
  - Water: 0.034 sq mi (0.089 km^{2})
- Elevation: 1,020 ft (310 m)

Population (2020)
  - Total: 3,646
  - Estimate (2025): 13,317
  - Density: 2,250/sq mi (868.9/km^{2})
- Time zone: UTC–6 (Central (CST))
  - Summer (DST): UTC–5 (CDT)
- ZIP Code: 78642
- Area codes: 512 and 737
- FIPS code: 48-42664
- GNIS feature ID: 2410833
- Sales tax: 8.25%
- Website: libertyhilltx.gov

Liberty Hill is a city in Williamson County, Texas, United States. The population was 3,646 at the 2020 census, and according to 2025 census estimates, the city is estimated to have a population of 13,317. Liberty Hill is part of the Greater Austin metropolitan area.

== History ==
The first settlers arrived in the 1840s. A post office was opened three miles west of the present townsite in 1853 and its first postmaster, W.O. Spencer, suggested for the place the name Liberty Hill. Subsequently, the town moved eastward twice. In 1871, a building of hand-cut limestone was erected by S.P. Stubblefield at the corner of Main and Myrtle. He operated the property as a general store until 1881. This structure, today known as the Stubblefield Visitors Center, is the oldest still occupied in Liberty Hill.

== Geography ==
Liberty Hill is located approximately 29 miles northwest of Austin.

According to the United States Census Bureau, the city has a total area of 4.637 square miles (12.01 km^{2}), of which, 4.634 square miles (12.00 km^{2}) is land and 0.003 square miles (0.01 km^{2}) is water.

=== Climate ===
The climate in this area is characterized by hot, humid summers and generally mild to cool winters. According to the Köppen Climate Classification system, Liberty Hill has a humid subtropical climate, abbreviated "Cfa" on climate maps.

== Demographics ==
Historical population
Census	Pop.	Note	%±
1990	1,607		—
2000	1,409		−12.3%
2010	967		−31.4%
2020	3,646		277.0%
2025 (est.)	13,317		265.2%
U.S. Decennial Census; Texas Almanac: 1850-2000; 2020 Census

=== 2020 census ===
As of the 2020 census, there were 3,646 people, 1,359 households, and 962 families residing in the city; the population density was 786.8 inhabitants per square mile (303.8/km^{2}).

The median age was 31.9 years. 29.2% of residents were under the age of 18 and 9.9% of residents were 65 years of age or older. For every 100 females there were 92.8 males, and for every 100 females age 18 and over there were 91.0 males age 18 and over.

79.6% of residents lived in urban areas, while 20.4% lived in rural areas.

There were 1,359 households in Liberty Hill, of which 41.89% had children under the age of 18 living in them. Of all households, 44.29% were married-couple households, 19.3% were households with a male householder and no spouse or partner present, and 27.4% were households with a female householder and no spouse or partner present. About 23.4% of all households were made up of individuals and 9.0% had someone living alone who was 65 years of age or older.

There were 1,529 housing units, of which 11.1% were vacant. The homeowner vacancy rate was 9.1% and the rental vacancy rate was 7.6%.

Racial composition as of the 2020 census
Race	Number	Percent
White	2,553	70.0%
Black or African American	102	2.8%
American Indian and Alaska Native	47	1.3%
Asian	59	1.6%
Native Hawaiian and Other Pacific Islander	5	0.1%
Some other race	321	8.8%
Two or more races	559	15.3%
Hispanic or Latino (of any race)	990	27.2%

=== 2010 census ===
As of the 2010 census, there were 967 people, 337 households, and 224 families residing in the city. The population density was 431.8 inhabitants per square mile (166.7/km^{2}). There were 387 housing units. The racial makeup of the city was 83.9% White, 1.6% African American, 0.7% Native American, 0.8% Asian, 0.0% Pacific Islander, 9.5% from other races, and 3.5% from two or more races. Hispanic or Latino of any race were 19.3%.

Of the 459 households 38.0% had children under the age of 18 living with them, 49.0% were married couples living together, and 33.5% were non-families. 27.9% of households were one person and 12.7% were one person aged 65 or older. The average household size was 2.55 and the average family size was 3.19.

The age distribution was 34.9% under the age of 18, and 12.3% 65 or older. The median age was 34.2 years.

The median household income was $56,955 and the median family income was $73,125. Males had a median income of $43,098 versus $40,481 for females. The per capita income for the city was $20,112. About 9.1% of families and 14.1% of the population were below the poverty line, including 25.9% of those under age 18.

== Arts and culture ==
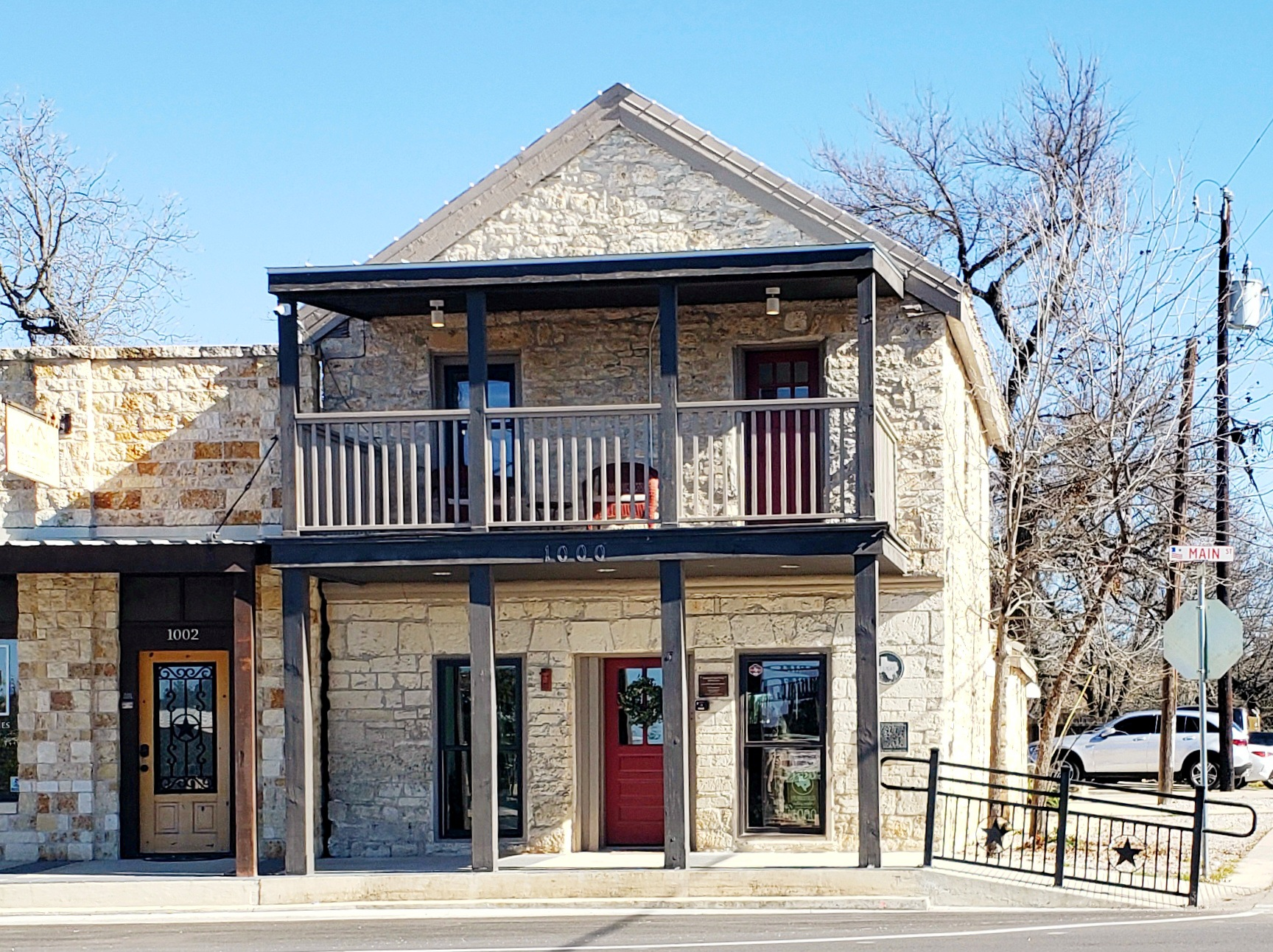
Stubblefield Building, Liberty Hill - built in 1871

In 1976, Liberty Hill hosted an International Sculpture Symposium, which created the Liberty Hill International Sculpture Park. The park hosts 27 monumental pieces made from granite, concrete, bronze, and limestone.

== Education ==
The City of Liberty Hill is served by the Liberty Hill Independent School District.

The Liberty Hill High School football team won the Texas Football State Championship in 3A Division II against Celina High School in 2006 and in 3A Division I against Gilmer High School in 2007.

In 2025, Liberty Hill boys soccer won the 5A Division 2 State Championship. Liberty Hill lost the championship game to Highland Park High School, but Highland Park's win was eventually vacated for using an ineligible player, crowning Liberty Hill as the state champions.

== Media ==
Liberty Hill has one newspaper, The Liberty Hill Independent.

== Notable People ==
- Trey Hillman, bench coach for the Houston Astros and former manager for the Kansas City Royals
- John Reynolds Hughes, famous Texas Ranger, probable person on whom "The Lone Ranger", by Zane Grey, was based
- Pearl A. Neas, longtime registrar at Southwestern University
- Dustin Rhodes, professional wrestler currently signed to All Elite Wrestling
