= Jerry Richardson Indoor Stadium =

College basketball arena in South Carolina, USA

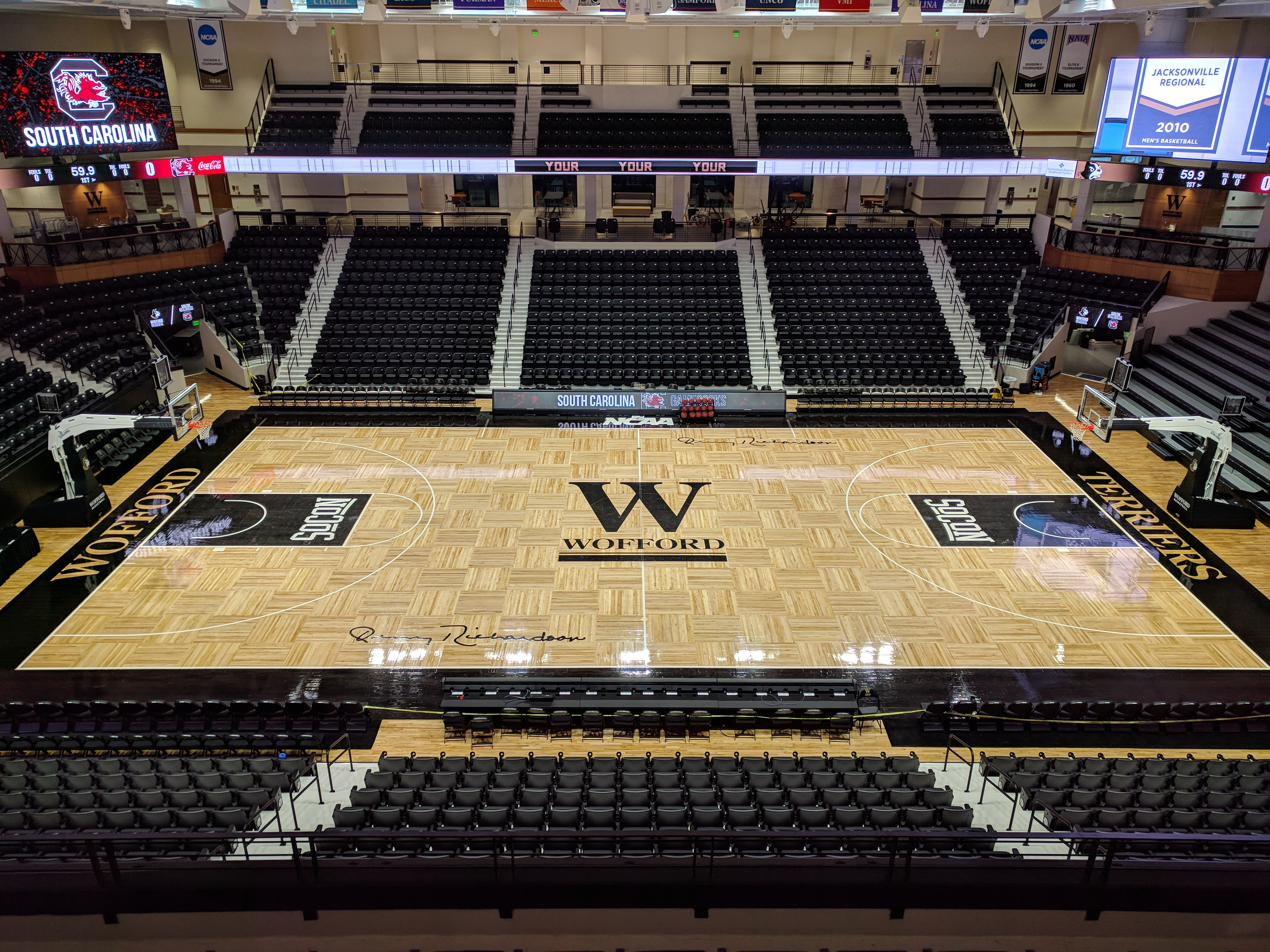

- Location in South Carolina Location in the United States
- Location: 601 Cummings Street; Spartanburg, South Carolina 29303
- Coordinates: 34.963427°N 81.933630°W
- Owner: Wofford College
- Operator: Wofford College
- Capacity: 3,400 (2017-present)
- Surface: Hardwood

Construction
- Built: by Robins & Morton
- Opened: September 20, 2017

Tenants
- Wofford Terriers men's basketball (NCAA) (2017–present); Wofford Terriers women's basketball (NCAA) (2017–present)

Jerry Richardson Indoor Stadium is a college basketball arena located in Spartanburg, South Carolina on the campus of Wofford College. It became home of the Wofford Terriers men's and women's basketball teams at the start of the 2017–18 season, replacing Benjamin Johnson Arena. The main basketball arena seats 3,400, and the building also includes a 350-seat volleyball arena.

Construction on the facility began in January 2016. The building opened with a volleyball match between Wofford and Furman on September 20, 2017, and the basketball arena opened on November 10 with a men's game against South Carolina.

The Jerry Richardson Indoor Stadium has a seating capacity for non-athletics functions, such as commencement and concerts, of 4,500. It includes home and visitor lockers for multiple sports, a state-of-the-art training room, coaches' offices and locker rooms and team meeting rooms. Other features include a video board and ribbon boards, plus designated areas specifically designed for students, fans, children and donors. Four open-air suites are located in the corners. It was designed by McMillan Pazdan Smith Architecture with Robins and Morton as general contractors.
