= 2017–18 Chattanooga Mocs women's basketball team =

Intercollegiate basketball season

2017–18 Chattanooga Mocs women's basketball

WNIT, First Round
- Conference: Southern Conference
- Record: 17–13 (8–6 SoCon)
- Head coach: Jim Foster (5th season)
- Assistant coaches: Katie Burrows; Brittany Jonson; Jon Goldberg
- Home arena: McKenzie Arena

2017–18 Southern Conference women's basketball standings
	Conf.				Overall
Team	W		L	PCT	W		L	PCT
No. 25 Mercer †	14	–	0	1.000	30	–	3	.909
East Tennessee State	11	–	3	.786	20	–	13	.606
Chattanooga	8	–	6	.571	17	–	13	.567
Furman	7	–	7	.500	18	–	14	.563
Samford	6	–	8	.429	15	–	16	.484
UNC Greensboro	6	–	8	.429	13	–	18	.419
Wofford	3	–	11	.214	10	–	20	.333
Western Carolina	1	–	13	.071	5	–	25	.167
† 2018 SoCon Tournament winner As of March 19, 2018

The 2017–18 Chattanooga Mocs women's basketball team represented the University of Tennessee at Chattanooga during the 2017–18 NCAA Division I women's basketball season. The Mocs, led by fifth-year head coach Jim Foster, played their home games at the McKenzie Arena as members of the Southern Conference (SoCon). The Mocs finished the season 17–13, 8–6 in third place in the SoCon, losing to UNC Greensboro in the conference tournament. They received an at-large berth in the 2018 WNIT and lost in the first round to UAB.

On February 1, 2018, Foster notched his 900th career win as a head coach, becoming the eighth fastest to reach that mark and tying for seventh in all-time career wins. He retired shortly after season's end in May 2018.

== Previous season ==
The Mocs finished the 2016–17 season with a 21–11 overall record and 12–2 in the SoCon, making them co-champions of the regular season with Mercer. The Mocs swept the conference tournament, beating Mercer in the championship game and securing a first-round bid to the NCAA tournament. However, the Mocs lost the opening game to Louisville.

== Roster ==
2017–18 Chattanooga Mocs women's basketball team
Players
Coaches

Pos.	#	Name	Height	Year	Hometown
G	3	Mya Long	5 ft 9 in (1.75 m)	Fr	Chattanooga, TN
G	4	Arianne Whitaker (redshirt)	6 ft 2 in (1.88 m)	So	Cincinnati, OH
G	5	Anna Claire Noblit	5 ft 7 in (1.7 m)	Sr	Tuscumbia, AL
G	10	Jacobi Lynn	5 ft 7 in (1.7 m)	Fr	Tellico Plains, TN
G	12	Bria Dial	6 ft 0 in (1.83 m)	Fr	Murfreesboro, TN
G	14	Molly Melton	5 ft 4 in (1.63 m)	Jr	Knoxville, TN
G/F	20	Keiana Gilbert	5 ft 11 in (1.8 m)	Sr	Pulaski, TN
G	22	Shelby Davenport (redshirt)	6 ft 0 in (1.83 m)	Jr	Murfreesboro, TN
G	23	Brooke Burns	5 ft 10 in (1.78 m)	Fr	Gadsden, AL
G	24	Nakeia Burks	5 ft 10 in (1.78 m)	Jr	Huntsville, AL
F	32	Rochelle Lee (redshirt)	6 ft 4 in (1.93 m)	Fr	Memphis, TN
G	33	Laklyn Bouldin	5 ft 9 in (1.75 m)	So	Spencer, TN
G/F	35	Aryanna Gilbert (redshirt)	5 ft 9 in (1.75 m)	Sr	Pulaski, TN
F/C	41	Ashlyn Wert (redshirt)	6 ft 5 in (1.96 m)	Jr	Lancaster, PA

Head coach

- Jim Foster (Temple)

Assistant coach(es)

- Katie Burrows (Chattanooga)
- Brittany Jonson (Ohio State)
- Jon Goldberg (Emerson)

Legend

- (C) Team captain
- (S) Suspended
- (I) Ineligible
- (W) Walk-on
- Injured
- Current redshirt

Roster

== Schedule ==
Date time, TV	Rank^{#}	Opponent^{#}	Result	Record	Site (attendance) city, state
Regular Season
November 11, 2017*; 1:00 pm		at Green Bay	L 30–60	0–1	Kress Events Center (1,908); Green Bay, WI
November 13, 2017*; 6:30 pm		UCF	L 57–58	0–2	McKenzie Arena (1,534); Chattanooga, TN
November 15, 2017*; 5:00 pm		at Stetson	L 67–78	0–3	Edmunds Center (171); DeLand, Florida
November 18, 2017*; 11:00 am		Presbyterian	W 71–51	1–3	McKenzie Arena (2,780); Chattanooga, TN
November 20, 2017*; 7:00 pm, BTN+		at Indiana	W 64–61	2–3	Simon Skjodt Assembly Hall (2,492); Bloomington, IN
November 24, 2017*; 6:00 pm		vs. Northwestern; Challenge in Music City	W 61–44	3–3	Memorial Gymnasium (967); Nashville, TN
November 25, 2017*; 8:30 pm		vs. Georgetown; Challenge in Music City	W 54–41	4–3	Memorial Gymnasium (534); Nashville, TN
November 26, 2017*; 6:30 pm		vs. Auburn; Challenge in Music City	W 50–41	5–3	Memorial Gymnasium (596); Nashville, TN
December 2, 2017*; 2:00 pm		UT Martin	W 87–82 ^{OT}	6–3	McKenzie Arena (3,676); Chattanooga, TN
December 10, 2017*; 3:30 pm		Virginia Tech	L 44–64	6–4	McKenzie Arena (3,676); Chattanooga, TN
December 17, 2017*; 2:00 pm		Florida Gulf Coast	W 68–61	7–4	McKenzie Arena (1,457); Chattanooga, TN
December 20, 2017*; Noon		at Florida; Gator Holiday Classic	W 65–60	8–4	O'Connell Center (1,054); Gainesville, FL
December 21, 2017*; 2:30 pm		vs. Princeton; Gator Holiday Classic	L 49–59	8–5	O'Connell Center (1,008); Gainesville, FL
December 28, 2017*; 2:00 pm		Hampton	W 64–52	9–5	McKenzie Arena (1,724); Chattanooga, TN
SoCon Regular Season
January 4, 2018; 5:30 pm		UNC Greensboro	W 49–42	10–5 (1–0)	McKenzie Arena (3,844); Chattanooga, TN
January 6, 2018; 2:00 pm		Western Carolina	W 47–32	11–5 (2–0)	McKenzie Arena (4,444); Chattanooga, TN
January 13, 2018; 2:00 pm		at East Tennessee State	L 58–65	11–6 (2–1)	Freedom Hall Civic Center (908); Johnson City, TN
January 18, 2018; 6:00 pm		at Wofford	W 54–47	12–6 (3–1)	Benjamin Johnson Arena (217); Spartanburg, SC
January 20, 2018; 2:00 pm		at Furman	L 57–58	12–7 (3–2)	Timmons Arena (662); Greenville, SC
January 25, 2018; 6:30 pm		Samford	W 68–58	13–7 (4–2)	McKenzie Arena (1,406); Chattanooga, TN
January 27, 2018; 2:00 pm		Mercer	L 50–71	13–8 (4–3)	McKenzie Arena; Chattanooga, TN
February 1, 2018; 5:00 pm		at Western Carolina	W 58–41	14–8 (5–3)	Ramsey Center; Cullhowee, NC
February 3, 2018; 4:00 pm		at UNC Greensboro	W 73–57	15–8 (6–3)	Fleming Gymnasium (423); Greensboro, NC
February 10, 2018; 2:00 pm		East Tennessee State	L 55–61	15–9 (6–4)	McKenzie Arena (4,380); Chattanooga, TN
February 15, 2018; 6:30 pm		Furman	L 45–50	15–10 (6–5)	McKenzie Arena (1,423); Chattanooga, TN
February 17, 2018; 2:00 pm		Wofford	W 76–46	16–10 (7–5)	McKenzie Arena (4,235); Chattanooga, TN
February 22, 2018; 7:00 pm		at Mercer	L 56–65	16–11 (7–6)	Hawkins Arena (1,672); Macon, GA
February 24, 2018; 3:00 pm		at Samford	W 71–65	17–11 (8–6)	Pete Hanna Center (417); Homewood, AL
SoCon Tournament
March 1, 2018; 5:45 pm	(3)	vs. (6) UNC Greensboro; Quarterfinals	L 66–70 ^{2OT}	17–12	U.S. Cellular Center; Asheville, NC
WNIT
March 15, 2018; 7:00 pm		at UAB; First Round	L 50–60	17–13	Bartow Arena; Birmingham, AL
*Non-conference game. ^{#}Rankings from AP Poll. (#) Tournament seedings in parentheses. All times are in Eastern Time.
