= 2016–17 East Tennessee State Buccaneers women's basketball team =

Intercollegiate basketball season

2016–17 East Tennessee State Buccaneers women's basketball
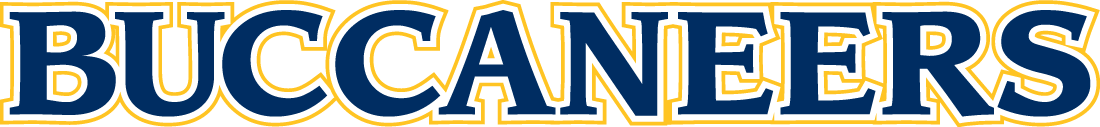
- Conference: Southern Conference
- Record: 16–14 (8–6 SoCon)
- Head coach: Brittney Ezell (4th season)
- Assistant coaches: Nikki Davis; Eric Dumas; Keisha McClinic
- Home arena: J. Madison Brooks Gymnasium

2016–17 Southern Conference women's basketball standings
	Conf.				Overall
Team	W		L	PCT	W		L	PCT
Mercer	12	–	2	.857	25	–	6	.806
Chattanooga*^{†}	12	–	2	.857	21	–	10	.677
East Tennessee State	8	–	6	.571	16	–	14	.533
UNC Greensboro	7	–	7	.500	17	–	14	.548
Furman	7	–	7	.500	14	–	17	.452
Samford	4	–	10	.286	12	–	19	.387
Wofford	3	–	11	.214	13	–	17	.433
Western Carolina	3	–	11	.214	8	–	22	.267
† 2017 SoCon Tournament winner * Tournament #1 seed

The 2016–17 East Tennessee State Buccaneers women's basketball team represented East Tennessee State University (ETSU) during the 2016–17 NCAA Division I women's basketball season. The "Bucs", led by fourth-year head coach Brittney Ezell, played their home games at the Freedom Hall Civic Center as members of the Southern Conference (SoCon). They finished the season 16–14, 8–6 in SoCon play to finish in third place. They lost in the quarterfinals of the SoCon women's tournament to Samford.

During the Elon game on December 17, 2016, junior guard Tianna Tarter became the 23rd ETSU women's basketball player to surpass the 1,000-point mark and only the fifth in program history to reach it in three seasons. On December 20, 2016, senior Shamauria Bridges became ETSU women's basketball's career leader in three-pointers in defeating Coppin State. Bridges ended the game at 242 career threes. Bridges finished the season with 90 made three-pointers, ranking as the most in a single season in school history and fifth most in SoCon history. Tarter ranked as tied in second place for three-pointers in school history.

== Previous season ==
The Bucs ended the 2015–16 season at 16–14, 8–6 in SoCon play to finish in fourth place. They lost in the quarterfinals of the SoCon women's tournament to Furman.

== Roster ==
2016–17 East Tennessee State Lady Buccaneers women's basketball team
Players
Coaches

Pos.	#	Name	Height	Year	Hometown
G	2	Shamauria Bridges	5 ft 7 in (1.7 m)	Sr	Miramar, Fla.
G	3	Adriane Vaughan	5 ft 9 in (1.75 m)	Sr	Midlothian, Va.
G	4	Carley Lytton	5 ft 11 in (1.8 m)	So	Floyd, Va.
F	5	Raven Dean	6 ft 1 in (1.85 m)	So	Charlotte, N.C.
G	10	Jada Craig	5 ft 8 in (1.73 m)	Fr	Winston-Salem, N.C.
G	11	Micah Norris	5 ft 8 in (1.73 m)	Fr	Murfreesboro, Tenn.
G	13	Kayla Marosites	5 ft 10 in (1.78 m)	Fr	Elizabethton, Tenn.
G	14	Kelci Marosites	5 ft 10 in (1.78 m)	Fr	Elizabethton, Tenn.
G	15	Tianna Tarter	5 ft 6 in (1.68 m)	Jr	Johnson City, Tenn.
G	22	Malloree Schurr	5 ft 10 in (1.78 m)	Jr	Montgomery, Texas
F	24	Anajae Stephney	6 ft 2 in (1.88 m)	Fr	Knoxville, Tenn.
F	30	Sadasia Tipps	6 ft 1 in (1.85 m)	So	Hickory, N.C.
F	44	Morgan Martin	6 ft 1 in (1.85 m)	So	Davenport, Iowa
C	45	Yamile Rodriguez	6 ft 4 in (1.93 m)	Sr	Santo Domingo, Dominican Republic

Head coach

- Brittney Ezell

Assistant coach(es)

- Laura Barry
- Nikki Davis
- Brittany Burkhardt

Legend

- (C) Team captain
- (S) Suspended
- (I) Ineligible
- (W) Walk-on
- Injured
- Current redshirt

Roster
Last update: November 4, 2016

== Schedule ==
Date time, TV	Rank^{#}	Opponent^{#}	Result	Record	Site (attendance) city, state
Exhibition
November 6, 2016*; 4:00 pm		Emory & Henry	W 84-39		J. Madison Brooks Gymnasium (733); Johnson City, TN
Non-conference regular season
November 11, 2016*; 7:00 pm		at Butler	W 68–59	1–0	Hinkle Fieldhouse (544); Indianapolis, IN
November 15, 2016*; 7:00 pm		No. 13 Tennessee	L 58–83	1–1	ETSU/Mountain States Health Alliance Athletic Center (6,072); Johnson City, TN
November 20, 2016*; 2:00 pm		Winthrop	W 62–45	2–1	J. Madison Brooks Gymnasium (643); Johnson City, TN
November 23, 2016*; 7:00 pm		Appalachian State	L 68–71	2–2	J. Madison Brooks Gymnasium (712); Johnson City, TN
November 26, 2016*; 1:00 pm		at Northern Kentucky	L 56–62	2–3	BB&T Arena (1,015); Highland Heights, KY
November 28, 2016*; 7:00 pm		Murray State	W 79–60	3–3	J. Madison Brooks Gymnasium (631); Johnson City, TN
November 30, 2016*; 5:15 pm		at Austin Peay	L 74–77	3–4	Dunn Center (1,403); Clarksville, TN
December 3, 2016*; 2:00 pm		Davidson	W 76–56	4–4	J. Madison Brooks Gymnasium (654); Johnson City, TN
December 6, 2016*; 7:00 pm		at Campbell	W 56–55	5–4	John W. Pope, Jr. Convocation Center (824); Buies Creek, NC
December 8, 2016*; 7:00 pm		Vanderbilt	L 72–80	5–5	J. Madison Brooks Gymnasium (1,014); Johnson City, TN
December 11, 2016*; 2:00 pm		at Tennessee Tech	W 82–76	6–5	Eblen Center (587); Cookeville, TN
December 17, 2016*; 2:00 pm		Elon	L 51–79	6–6	J. Madison Brooks Gymnasium (567); Johnson City, TN
December 19, 2016*; 3:00 pm		vs. Maine; University of Miami Holiday Tournament	L 48–61	6–7	Watsco Center; Coral Gables, FL
December 20, 2016*; 3:00 pm		vs. Coppin State; University of Miami Holiday Tournament	W 70–58	7–7	Watsco Center; Coral Gables, FL
December 28, 2016*; 7:00 pm		Old Dominion	W 70–60	8–7	J. Madison Brooks Gymnasium (634); Johnson City, TN
SoCon regular season
January 5, 2017; 5:00 pm		at Mercer	L 55–72	8–8 (0–1)	Hawkins Arena (1,272); Macon, GA
January 8, 2017; 1:00 pm		at Samford	W 69–57	9–8 (1–1)	Pete Hanna Center (315); Homewood, AL
January 14, 2017; 2:00 pm		at Chattanooga	L 45–60	9–9 (1–2)	McKenzie Arena (1,641); Chattanooga, TN
January 19, 2017; 7:00 pm		UNC Greensboro	W 60–52	10–9 (2–2)	J. Madison Brooks Gymnasium (718); Johnson City, TN
January 21, 2017; 2:00 pm		Western Carolina	W 76–57	11–9 (3–2)	J. Madison Brooks Gymnasium (876); Johnson City, TN
January 26, 2017; 7:00 pm		at Furman	W 74–64	12–9 (4–2)	Timmons Arena (301); Greenville, SC
January 28, 2017; 2:00 pm		at Wofford	W 77–69	13–9 (5–2)	Benjamin Johnson Arena (780); Spartanburg, SC
February 2, 2017; 11:00 am		Samford	W 61–56	14–9 (6–2)	J. Madison Brooks Gymnasium (1,722); Johnson City, TN
February 4, 2017; 2:00 pm		Mercer	L 56–71	14–10 (6–3)	J. Madison Brooks Gymnasium (1,011); Johnson City, TN
February 10, 2017; 7:00 pm		Chattanooga	L 62–70	14–11 (6–4)	J. Madison Brooks Gymnasium (1,316); Johnson City, TN
February 16, 2017; 7:00 pm		at Western Carolina	W 72–55	15–11 (7–4)	Ramsey Center (387); Cullhowee, NC
February 18, 2017; 4:00 pm		at UNC Greensboro	L 62–73	15–12 (7–5)	Fleming Gymnasium (718); Greensboro, NC
February 23, 2017; 7:00 pm		Wofford	L 52–54	15–13 (7–6)	J. Madison Brooks Gymnasium (724); Johnson City, TN
February 25, 2017; 2:00 pm		Furman	W 75–66	16–13 (8–6)	J. Madison Brooks Gymnasium (833); Johnson City, TN
SoCon Tournament
March 2, 2017; 6:15 pm	(3)	vs. (6) Samford; Quarterfinals	L 64–67	16–14	U.S. Cellular Center (3,193); Asheville, NC
*Non-conference game. ^{#}Rankings from AP Poll. (#) Tournament seedings in parentheses. All times are in Eastern Time.
