= 2015–16 Furman Paladins women's basketball team =

Intercollegiate basketball season

2015–16 Furman Paladins women's basketball
- Conference: Southern Conference
- Record: 15–16 (7–7 SoCon)
- Head coach: Jackie Carson (6th season)
- Assistant coaches: Shawn Poppie; Jessica Kern; Pierre Curtis
- Home arena: Timmons Arena

2015–16 Southern Conference women's basketball standings
	Conf.				Overall
Team	W		L	PCT	W		L	PCT
Chattanooga †	12	–	2	.857	24	–	8	.750
Mercer*	12	–	2	.857	24	–	9	.727
Samford	11	–	3	.786	20	–	11	.645
East Tennessee State	8	–	6	.571	16	–	14	.533
Furman	7	–	7	.500	15	–	16	.484
Wofford	3	–	11	.214	9	–	20	.310
Western Carolina	3	–	11	.214	6	–	22	.214
UNC Greensboro	0	–	14	.000	8	–	22	.267
† 2016 SoCon Tournament winner As of March 18, 2016; Rankings from AP poll

The 2015–16 Furman Paladins women's basketball team represented Furman University during the 2015–16 NCAA Division I women's basketball season. The Paladins, led by sixth-year head coach Jackie Carson, played their home games at Timmons Arena and were members of the Southern Conference.

They finished the season 15–16, 7–7 in SoCon play to finish in fifth place. They advanced to the semifinals of the SoCon women's tournament, where they lost to Mercer.
