= 2015–16 East Tennessee State Buccaneers women's basketball team =

Intercollegiate basketball season

2015–16 East Tennessee State Buccaneers women's basketball
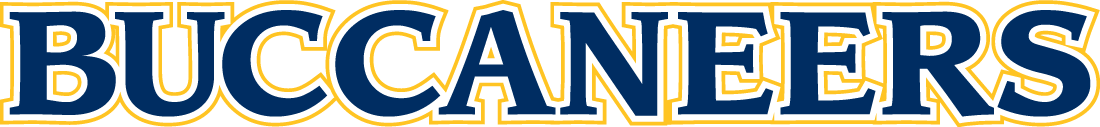
- Conference: Southern Conference
- Record: 16–14 (8–6 SoCon)
- Head coach: Brittney Ezell (3rd season)
- Assistant coaches: Laura Barry; Nikki Davis; Brittany Burkhardt
- Home arena: J. Madison Brooks Gymnasium

2015–16 Southern Conference women's basketball standings
	Conf.				Overall
Team	W		L	PCT	W		L	PCT
Chattanooga †	12	–	2	.857	24	–	8	.750
Mercer*	12	–	2	.857	24	–	9	.727
Samford	11	–	3	.786	20	–	11	.645
East Tennessee State	8	–	6	.571	16	–	14	.533
Furman	7	–	7	.500	15	–	16	.484
Wofford	3	–	11	.214	9	–	20	.310
Western Carolina	3	–	11	.214	6	–	22	.214
UNC Greensboro	0	–	14	.000	8	–	22	.267
† 2016 SoCon Tournament winner As of March 18, 2016; Rankings from AP poll

The 2015–16 East Tennessee State Buccaneers women's basketball team represented East Tennessee State University (ETSU) during the 2015–16 NCAA Division I women's basketball season. The "Bucs", led by third year head coach Brittney Ezell, played their home games at the Freedom Hall Civic Center as members of the Southern Conference (SoCon). They finished the season 16–14, 8–6 in SoCon play to finish in fourth place. They lost in the quarterfinals of the SoCon women's tournament to Furman.

During the February 4, 2016, win against Wofford, junior Shamauria Bridges hit a three-pointer to become the 22nd ETSU player to surpass the 1,000-point mark and only the fourth in program history to reach it in three seasons.

== Previous season ==
The Bucs finished the 2014–15 season at 21–12, 11–3 and made it to the Southern Conference tournament finals, before losing to Chattanooga in overtime. The team also received a bid to play in the 2015 Women's National Invitation Tournament for the third time in school history, but lost to NC State in the first round.

== Roster ==
2015–16 East Tennessee State Lady Buccaneers women's basketball team
Players
Coaches

Pos.	#	Name	Height	Year	Hometown
G	2	Shamauria Bridges	5 ft 7 in (1.7 m)	Jr	Miramar, Fla.
G	3	Adriane Vaughan	5 ft 9 in (1.75 m)	Jr	Midlothian, Va.
G	4	Carley Lytton	5 ft 11 in (1.8 m)	Fr	Floyd, Va.
F	5	Raven Dean	6 ft 1 in (1.85 m)	Fr	Charlotte, N.C.
G	10	Chandler Christopher	5 ft 8 in (1.73 m)	Sr	Greeneville, Tenn.
G	15	Tianna Tarter	5 ft 6 in (1.68 m)	So	Johnson City, Tenn.
G	22	Malloree Schurr	5 ft 10 in (1.78 m)	So	Montgomery, Texas
F	24	Shomari Kendrick	6 ft 2 in (1.88 m)	Sr	Lexington, Ky.
G	25	Kaylee Barnard (redshirt)	5 ft 8 in (1.73 m)	Fr	Orlando, Fla.
F	30	Sadasia Tipps	6 ft 1 in (1.85 m)	Fr	Hickory, N.C.
G	33	Mendy McNeese	5 ft 6 in (1.68 m)	So	Greeneville, Tenn.
F	44	Morgan Martin (redshirt)	6 ft 1 in (1.85 m)	Fr	Davenport, Iowa
C	45	Yamile Rodriguez	6 ft 4 in (1.93 m)	Jr	Santo Domingo, Dominican Republic

Head coach

- Brittney Ezell

Assistant coach(es)

- Laura Barry
- Nikki Davis
- Brittany Burkhardt

Legend

- (C) Team captain
- (S) Suspended
- (I) Ineligible
- (W) Walk-on
- Injured
- Current redshirt

Roster
Last update: November 1, 2015

== Schedule ==
Date time, TV	Rank^{#}	Opponent^{#}	Result	Record	Site (attendance) city, state
Exhibition
November 7, 2015*; 2:00 pm		Milligan	W 88–56		J. Madison Brooks Gymnasium (691); Johnson City, TN
Regular Season
November 13, 2015*; 7:00 pm		UNC Asheville	W 74–68	1–0	J. Madison Brooks Gymnasium (710); Johnson City, TN
November 15, 2015*; 2:00 pm		at Wake Forest	L 52–69	1–1	The Joel (554); Winston-Salem, NC
November 19, 2015*; 7:00 pm		at Appalachian State	L 50–72	1–2	Holmes Center (380); Boone, NC
November 21, 2015*; 7:00 pm		Brevard College	W 69–46	2–2	J. Madison Brooks Gymnasium (627); Johnson City, TN
November 23, 2015*; 7:00 pm		at Old Dominion	W 56–52	3–2	Ted Constant Convocation Center (1,744); Norfolk, VA
November 27, 2015*; 7:00 pm		at Eastern Kentucky	L 41–64	3–3	Alumni Coliseum (150); Richmond, KY
November 29, 2015*; 2:00 pm		at Elon	L 38–50	3–4	Alumni Gym (572); Elon, NC
December 2, 2015*; 7:00 pm		at No. 8 Tennessee	L 49–85	3–5	Thompson–Boling Arena (9,328); Knoxville, TN
December 5, 2015*; 1:00 pm		at Vanderbilt	L 39–65	3–6	Memorial Gymnasium (2,264); Nashville, TN
December 13, 2015*; 2:00 pm		Armstrong State	W 62–52	4–6	J. Madison Brooks Gymnasium (632); Johnson City, TN
December 16, 2015*; 7:00 pm		Campbell	W 70–55	5–6	J. Madison Brooks Gymnasium (536); Johnson City, TN
December 18, 2015*; 11:30 am		at Davidson	W 65–58	6–6	John M. Belk Arena (864); Davidson, NC
December 21, 2015*; 7:00 pm		Austin Peay	W 80–76	7–6	J. Madison Brooks Gymnasium (764); Johnson City, TN
December 29, 2015*; 2:00 pm		at Iona	L 50–56	7–7	Hynes Athletic Center (328); New Rochelle, NY
January 3, 2016*; 2:00 pm		Lees–McRae	W 73–46	8–7	J. Madison Brooks Gymnasium (635); Johnson City, TN
January 7, 2016; 7:00 pm		at Furman	L 77–81	8–8 (0–1)	Timmons Arena; Greenville, SC
January 9, 2016; 5:00 pm		at Wofford	W 70–54	9–8 (1–1)	Benjamin Johnson Arena (191); Spartanburg, SC
January 14, 2016; 7:00 pm		at UNC Greensboro	W 89–73	10–8 (2–1)	Fleming Gymnasium (593); Greensboro, NC
January 16, 2016; 2:00 pm		Western Carolina	W 74–62	11–8 (3–1)	J. Madison Brooks Gymnasium (852); Johnson City, TN
January 21, 2016; 7:00 pm		at Samford	L 47–55	11–9 (3–2)	Pete Hanna Center (334); Homewood, AL
January 23, 2016; 2:00 pm		at Mercer	W 55–53	12–9 (4–2)	Hawkins Arena (721); Macon, GA
January 30, 2016; 2:00 pm		Chattanooga	L 57–65	12–10 (4–3)	J. Madison Brooks Gymnasium (1,034); Johnson City, TN
February 4, 2016; 11:00 am		Wofford	W 70–69	13–10 (5–3)	J. Madison Brooks Gymnasium (1,814); Johnson City, TN
February 6, 2016; 2:00 pm		Furman	W 68–64	14–10 (6–3)	J. Madison Brooks Gymnasium (624); Johnson City, TN
February 11, 2016; 5:00 pm		at Western Carolina	W 75–73	15–10 (7–3)	Ramsey Center (1,982); Cullhowee, NC
February 13, 2016; 2:00 pm		UNC Greensboro	W 80–77	16–10 (8–3)	J. Madison Brooks Gymnasium (592); Johnson City, TN
February 18, 2016; 7:00 pm		Mercer	L 45–61	16–11 (8–4)	J. Madison Brooks Gymnasium (755); Johnson City, TN
February 20, 2016; 2:00 pm		Samford	L 51–56	16–12 (8–5)	J. Madison Brooks Gymnasium (762); Johnson City, TN
February 27, 2016; 2:00 pm		at Chattanooga	L 42–66	16–13 (8–6)	McKenzie Arena (2,372); Chattanooga, TN
SoCon Tournament
March 3, 2016; 1:45 pm, ESPN3		vs. Furman; Quarterfinals	L 68–71	16–14	U.S. Cellular Center; Asheville, NC
*Non-conference game. ^{#}Rankings from AP Poll. (#) Tournament seedings in parentheses. All times are in Eastern Time.
