= 2015–16 Chattanooga Mocs women's basketball team =

Intercollegiate basketball season

2015–16 Chattanooga Mocs women's basketball

UNCW Christmas Classic Champions SoCon Regular Season co-champions & Tournament Champions

NCAA Women's Tournament, first round
- Conference: Southern Conference
- Record: 24–8 (12–2 SoCon)
- Head coach: Jim Foster (3rd season)
- Assistant coaches: Katie Burrows; Brittany Jonson; John McCray
- Home arena: McKenzie Arena

2015–16 Southern Conference women's basketball standings
	Conf.				Overall
Team	W		L	PCT	W		L	PCT
Chattanooga †	12	–	2	.857	24	–	8	.750
Mercer*	12	–	2	.857	24	–	9	.727
Samford	11	–	3	.786	20	–	11	.645
East Tennessee State	8	–	6	.571	16	–	14	.533
Furman	7	–	7	.500	15	–	16	.484
Wofford	3	–	11	.214	9	–	20	.310
Western Carolina	3	–	11	.214	6	–	22	.214
UNC Greensboro	0	–	14	.000	8	–	22	.267
† 2016 SoCon Tournament winner As of March 18, 2016; Rankings from AP poll

The 2015–16 Chattanooga Lady Mocs basketball team represented the University of Tennessee at Chattanooga during the 2015–16 NCAA Division I women's basketball season. The Lady Mocs, led by third year head coach Jim Foster, play their home games at the McKenzie Arena and are members of the Southern Conference. They begin the season ranked 25th in the AP poll. They finished the season 24–8, 12–2 in SoCon play to share the SoCon regular season title with Mercer. They also won the SoCon Women's Tournament to earn an automatic trip to the NCAA women's tournament where they lost in the first round to Mississippi State.

== Roster ==
2015–16 Chattanooga Lady Mocs basketball team women's basketball team
Players
Coaches

Pos.	#	Name	Height	Year	Hometown
G	1	Alicia Payne	5 ft 9 in (1.75 m)	Sr	Memphis, TN
F/C	3	Jasmine Joyner	6 ft 2 in (1.88 m)	Jr	Southaven, MS
G	5	Anna Claire Noblit	5 ft 7 in (1.7 m)	So	Tuscumbia, AL
F	10	Queen Alford (redshirt)	5 ft 10 in (1.78 m)	Jr	Decatur, GA
G	14	Molly Melton	5 ft 4 in (1.63 m)	Fr	Knoxville, TN
G/F	20	Keiana Gilbert	5 ft 11 in (1.8 m)	So	Columbia, TN
G/F	21	Sydney Vanlandingham (redshirt)	5 ft 11 in (1.8 m)	Jr	Hermitage, TN
G	22	Shelby Davenport	6 ft 0 in (1.83 m)	So	Murfreesboro, TN
G	23	Moses Johnson	6 ft 0 in (1.83 m)	Jr	Atlanta, GA
G	24	Nakeia Burks	5 ft 10 in (1.78 m)	Fr	Huntsville, AL
G	25	Chelsey Schumpert	5 ft 4 in (1.63 m)	Jr	Paducah, KY
F/C	30	Ansley Chilton (redshirt)	6 ft 3 in (1.91 m)	So	Trenton, GA
G/F	35	Aryanna Gilbert (redshirt)	5 ft 9 in (1.75 m)	So	Columbia, TN
F/C	41	Ashlyn Wert (redshirt)	6 ft 5 in (1.96 m)	Fr	Lancaster, PA

Head coach

- Jim Foster (Temple)

Assistant coach(es)

- Katie Burrows (Chattanooga)
- Brittany Jonson (Illinois)
- John McCray (Ohio State)

Legend

- (C) Team captain
- (S) Suspended
- (I) Ineligible
- (W) Walk-on
- Injured
- Current redshirt

Roster

== Schedule ==
Date time, TV	Rank^{#}	Opponent^{#}	Result	Record	Site (attendance) city, state
Non-conference Regular Season
November 13, 2015*; 6:30 pm	No. 25	McNeese State; Preseason WNIT First Round	W 68–53	1–0	McKenzie Arena (1,565); Chattanooga, TN
November 15, 2015*; 2:00 pm	No. 25	Butler	W 60–49	2–0	McKenzie Arena (1,549); Chattanooga, TN
November 17, 2015*; 7:00 pm	No. 24	at Indiana; Preseason WNIT Second Round	L 43–54	2–1	Assembly Hall (1,960); Chattanooga, TN
November 20, 2015*; 6:30 pm	No. 24	Southern Miss; Preseason WNIT Consolation round	W 53–48 ^{OT}	3–1	McKenzie Arena (1,111); Chattanooga, TN
November 23, 2015*; 7:00 pm		at No. 4 Tennessee	L 57–59	3–2	Thompson–Boling Arena (9,449); Knoxville, TN
November 25, 2015*; 6:30 pm		Arkansas State	W 55–54	4–2	McKenzie Arena (1,189); Chattanooga, TN
November 28, 2015*; 2:00 pm		UT-Martin	W 61–46	5–2	McKenzie Arena (1,238); Chattanooga, TN
November 30, 2015*; 6:30 pm, SNY/ESPN3		No. 1 Connecticut	L 31–79	5–3	McKenzie Arena (6,104); Chattanooga, TN
December 13, 2015*; 2:00 pm		at No. 21 South Florida	L 33–61	5–4	USF Sun Dome (1,779); Tampa, Florida
December 16, 2015*; 11:00 am		Belmont	W 62–53	6–4	McKenzie Arena (1,788); Chattanooga, TN
December 18, 2015*; Noon		vs. East Carolina; UNCW Christmas Classic	W 72–61	7–4	Trask Coliseum; Wilmington, NC
December 19, 2015*; 2:00 pm		at UNC Wilmington; UNCW Christmas Classic	W 61–33	8–4	Trask Coliseum (417); Wilmington, NC
December 28, 2015*; 10:00 pm		at No. 11 Stanford	L 30–73	8–5	Maples Pavilion (3,410); Stanford, CA
January 4, 2016*; 6:30 pm		Harvard	W 62–58	9–5	McKenzie Arena (1,398); Chattanooga, TN
SoCon Regular Season
January 7, 2016; 6:00 pm		at Wofford	W 53–40	10–5 (1–0)	Benjamin Johnson Arena (182); Spartanburg, SC
January 9, 2016; 2:00 pm, ESPN3		at Furman	W 56–50	11–5 (2–0)	Timmons Arena (507); Greenville, SC
January 13, 2016; 6:30 pm		Western Carolina	W 77–59	12–5 (3–0)	McKenzie Arena (1,422); Chattanooga, TN
January 16, 2016; 2:00 pm		UNC Greensboro	W 72–61	13–5 (4–0)	McKenzie Arena (2,871); Chattanooga, TN
January 21, 2016; 7:00 pm, ESPN3		at Mercer	L 44–67	13–6 (4–1)	Hawkins Arena (1,574); Macon, GA
January 23, 2016; 3:00 pm, ESPN3		at Samford	L 43–48	13–7 (4–2)	Pete Hanna Center (667); Homewood, AL
January 30, 2016; 2:00 pm		at East Tennessee State	W 65–57	14–7 (5–2)	Freedom Hall Civic Center (1,034); Johnson City, TN
February 4, 2016; 5:30 pm		Furman	W 61–46	15–7 (6–2)	McKenzie Arena (1,785); Chattanooga, TN
February 6, 2016; 2:00 pm		Wofford	W 65–48	16–7 (7–2)	McKenzie Arena (2,452); Chattanooga, TN
February 11, 2016; 7:00 pm		at UNC Greensboro	W 74–53	17–7 (8–2)	Fleming Gymnasium (435); Greensboro, NC
February 13, 2016; 2:00 pm		at Western Carolina	W 65–51	18–7 (9–2)	Ramsey Center; Cullhowee, NC
February 17, 2016; 6:30 pm		Mercer	W 53–30	19–7 (10–2)	McKenzie Arena (1,533); Chattanooga, TN
February 20, 2016; 2:00 pm		Samford	W 67–45	20–7 (11–2)	McKenzie Arena (2,933); Chattanooga, TN
February 27, 2016; 2:00 pm		East Tennessee State	W 66–42	21–7 (12–2)	McKenzie Arena (2,372); Chattanooga, TN
SoCon Tournament
March 3, 2016; 4:00 pm, ESPN3		vs. Western Carolina; Quarterfinals	W 74–56	22–7	U.S. Cellular Center; Asheville, NC
March 4, 2016; 1:15 pm, ESPN3		vs. Samford; Semifinals	W 49–41	23–7	U.S. Cellular Center; Asheville, NC
March 6, 2016; 1:05 pm, ESPN3		vs. Mercer; Championship Game	W 65–57	24–7	U.S. Cellular Center (1,320); Asheville, NC
NCAA Women's Tournament
March 18, 2016*; 1:30 pm, ESPN2		at No. 15 Mississippi State; First Round	L 50–60	24–8	Humphrey Coliseum (5,115); Starkville, MS
*Non-conference game. ^{#}Rankings from AP Poll. (#) Tournament seedings in parentheses. All times are in Eastern Time.

== Rankings ==
Ranking movement Legend: ██ Increase in ranking. ██ Decrease in ranking. ██ Not ranked the previous week. RV=Received votes.
Poll	Pre- Season	Week 2	Week 3	Week 4	Week 5	Week 6	Week 7	Week 8	Week 9	Week 10	Week 11	Week 12	Week 13	Week 14	Week 15	Week 16	Week 17	Week 18	Final
AP	25	24	NR	NR	NR	NR	NR	NR	NR	NR	NR	NR	NR	NR	NR	NR	NR	NR	NR
Coaches	RV	RV	RV	NR	NR	NR	NR	NR	NR	NR	NR	NR	NR	NR	NR	NR	NR	RV	
