= Southern Conference Hall of Fame =

- Established: 2009
- Location: Spartanburg, South Carolina
- Website: SoCon Hall of Fame

The Southern Conference Hall of Fame, located in Spartanburg, South Carolina, USA, is a hall of fame devoted to former Southern Conference student-athletes, coaches, and administrators. The Hall of Fame, with an inaugural class of 10, was established in 2009. The second class for 2010 included seven former conference greats.

== Criteria for induction ==
Athletes who competed for a minimum of two seasons along with coaches and administrators who spent at least five years in the conference were eligible for consideration. A total of 254 candidates from former and current conference institutions were eligible for induction into the first class.

== Members ==
As of 2026, the Hall of Fame has 65 members.

Name	Institution	Sport	Inducted
2007 Appalachian State Mountaineers football team	Appalachian State	Football	2026
Adrian Peterson	Georgia Southern	Football	2009
Ali Lord	UNC Greensboro	Soccer	2024
Angie Barker	East Tennessee State	Track & Field	2012
Anita Buggins	Georgia Southern	Tennis	2022
Armanti Edwards	Appalachian State	Football	2016
Arnold Palmer	Wake Forest	Golf	2009
Banks McFadden	Clemson	Football and Basketball	2010
Bob McKillop	Davidson	Basketball	2026
Brad Faxon	Furman	Golf	2016
Chal Port	The Citadel	Baseball	2018
Charlie Justice	North Carolina	Football	2009
Charlie Teague	Wake Forest	Baseball	2014
Clint Dempsey	Furman	Soccer	2014
Clyde Mayes	Furman	Basketball	2022
Debbie Southern	Furman	Tennis	2018
DeShawne Blocker	East Tennessee State	Basketball	2022
Dexter Coakley	Appalachian State	Football	2011
Dick Groat	Duke	Baseball and Basketball	2009
Dick Modzelewski	Maryland	Football	2012
Dick Sheridan	Furman	Football	2024
Eddie Cameron	Duke	Basketball and Football	2014
Eric Breitenstein	Wofford	Football	2020
Everett Case	North Carolina State	Basketball	2010
Frank Selvy	Furman	Basketball	2009
Fred Hetzel	Davidson	Basketball	2010
J. Dallas Shirley	George Washington	Basketball	2010
Jackie Smith Carson	Furman	Basketball	2026
Jerry Moore	Appalachian State	Football	2014
Jerry West	West Virginia	Basketball	2009
Jim Burch	—	Special Contributor	2012
Karen Pelphrey	Marshall	Basketball	2016
Keith "Mister" Jennings	East Tennessee State	Basketball	2016
Kevin Martin	Western Carolina	Basketball	2024
Kirk Roach	Western Carolina	Football	2022
Lefty Driesell	Davidson	Basketball	2011
Les Robinson	The Citadel and East Tennessee State	Special Contributor	2018
Lynne Agee	UNC Greensboro	Basketball	2020
Mary Jayne Harrelson-Reeves	Appalachian State	Track & Field	2010
Megan Dunigan	Furman	Tennis	2009
Melissa Morrison-Howard	Appalachian State	Track & Field	2009
Michelle Fuzzard LaCourse	Chattanooga	Softball	2022
Mike Ayers	East Tennessee State and Wofford	Football	2018
Paul Chelimo	UNC Greensboro	Track & Field	2024
Paul Johnson	Georgia Southern	Football	2026
Paul Maguire	The Citadel	Football	2026
Paul Scarpa	Furman	Tennis	2012
Percy Beard	Auburn	Track & Field	2012
Regina Kirk	Chattanooga	Basketball	2011
Robert Neyland	Tennessee	Football	2011
Rod Hundley	West Virginia	Basketball	2010
Rod Thorn	West Virginia	Basketball and Baseball	2020
Ron Carter	Virginia Military	Basketball	2018
Rushia Brown	Furman	Basketball	2014
Sam Huff	West Virginia	Football	2009
Shannon Wommack	Chattanooga	Track & Field	2011
Stephen Curry	Davidson	Basketball	2016
Susan Gardner Mayhorn	Western Carolina	Cross-country Skiing and Track & Field	2018
Terrell Owens	Chattanooga	Football	2020
Terry Holland	Davidson	Basketball	2024
Thompson Usiyan	Appalachian State	Soccer	2026
Valorie Whiteside	Appalachian State	Basketball	2009
Vic Seixas	North Carolina	Tennis	2011
Wallace Wade	Alabama and Duke	Football	2010
Wayne Tolleson	Western Carolina	Baseball and Football	2020
