= 2017–18 East Tennessee State Buccaneers women's basketball team =

Intercollegiate basketball season

2017–18 East Tennessee State Buccaneers women's basketball
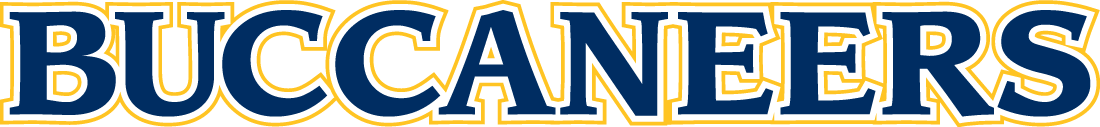

WNIT, First Round
- Conference: Southern Conference
- Record: 20–13 (11–3 SoCon)
- Head coach: Brittney Ezell (5th season)
- Assistant coaches: Nikki Davis; Eric Dumas; Keisha McClinic
- Home arena: J. Madison Brooks Gymnasium

2017–18 Southern Conference women's basketball standings
	Conf.				Overall
Team	W		L	PCT	W		L	PCT
No. 25 Mercer †	14	–	0	1.000	30	–	3	.909
East Tennessee State	11	–	3	.786	20	–	13	.606
Chattanooga	8	–	6	.571	17	–	13	.567
Furman	7	–	7	.500	18	–	14	.563
Samford	6	–	8	.429	15	–	16	.484
UNC Greensboro	6	–	8	.429	13	–	18	.419
Wofford	3	–	11	.214	10	–	20	.333
Western Carolina	1	–	13	.071	5	–	25	.167
† 2018 SoCon Tournament winner As of March 19, 2018

The 2017–18 East Tennessee State Buccaneers women's basketball team represented East Tennessee State University (ETSU) during the 2017–18 NCAA Division I women's basketball season. The "Bucs", led by fifth-year head coach Brittney Ezell, played their home games at the Freedom Hall Civic Center as members of the Southern Conference (SoCon). The Bucs finished the season 20–13, 11–3 in second place in the SoCon, losing to Mercer in the conference tournament. They received a berth in the 2018 WNIT but lost in the first round to the James Madison Dukes.

== Previous season ==
The Bucs ended the 2016–17 season at 16–14, 8–6 in SoCon play to finish in third place. They lost in the quarterfinals of the SoCon women's tournament to Samford.

== Roster ==
2017–18 East Tennessee State Lady Buccaneers women's basketball team
Players
Coaches

Pos.	#	Name	Height	Year	Hometown
G	2	Micah Scheetz	5 ft 8 in (1.73 m)	RS So	Knoxville, Tenn.
G	4	Carley Lytton	5 ft 11 in (1.8 m)	Jr	Floyd, Va.
F	5	Raven Dean	6 ft 1 in (1.85 m)	Jr	Charlotte, N.C.
G	10	Jada Craig	5 ft 8 in (1.73 m)	So	Winston-Salem, N.C.
G	15	Tianna Tarter	5 ft 6 in (1.68 m)	Sr	Johnson City, Tenn.
G	20	Erica Haynes-Overton	5 ft 5 in (1.65 m)	Fr	Nashville, Tenn.
G	22	Malloree Schurr	5 ft 10 in (1.78 m)	Sr	Montgomery, Texas
F	23	Britney Snowden	6 ft 0 in (1.83 m)	Jr	Pensacola, Fla.
F	24	Anajae Stephney	6 ft 2 in (1.88 m)	So	Knoxville, Tenn.
G	25	Alayjah Sherer	5 ft 11 in (1.8 m)	Fr	Tupelo, Miss.
F	30	Sadasia Tipps	6 ft 1 in (1.85 m)	Jr	Hickory, N.C.

Head coach

- Brittney Ezell

Assistant coach(es)

- Chris Lewis
- Keisha McClinic

Legend

- (C) Team captain
- (S) Suspended
- (I) Ineligible
- (W) Walk-on
- Injured
- Current redshirt

Roster
Last update: August 31, 2017

== Schedule ==
Date time, TV	Rank^{#}	Opponent^{#}	Result	Record	Site (attendance) city, state
Regular Season
November 10, 2017*; 7:00 pm		Cincinnati	W 87–77	1–0	J. Madison Brooks Gymnasium (1,099); Johnson City, TN
November 12, 2017*; 2:00 pm		at No. 14 Tennessee	L 49–87	1–1	Thompson–Boling Arena (8,869); Knoxville, TN
November 15, 2017*; 6:00 pm		at Appalachian State	W 70–57	2–1	Holmes Center (317); Boone, NC
November 17, 2017*; 7:00 pm		Tennessee Tech	W 74–55	3–1	J. Madison Brooks Gymnasium (678); Johnson City, TN
November 19, 2017*; 1:00 pm		Duquesne	W 81–77	4–1	J. Madison Brooks Gymnasium (532); Johnson City, TN
November 24, 2017*; 7:30 pm		vs. No. 6 Notre Dame; Gulf Coast Showcase quarterfinals	L 46–77	4–2	Germain Arena; Estero, FL
November 25, 2017*; 1:30 pm		vs. Washington State; Gulf Coast Showcase consolation 2nd round	L 76–80	4–3	Germain Arena; Estero, FL
November 26, 2017*; 11:00 am		vs. Western Michigan; Gulf Coast Showcase 7th place game	L 79–87	4–4	Germain Arena; Estero, FL
November 29, 2017*; 6:00 pm		at Murray State	W 96–68	5–4	CFSB Center; Murray, KY
December 3, 2017*; 2:00 pm		at Winthrop	W 74–63	6–4	Winthrop Coliseum (147); Rock Hill, SC
December 10, 2017*; 3:00 pm		at Houston	L 69–88	6–5	H&PE Arena (569); Houston, TX
December 14, 2017*; 7:00 pm		at NC State	L 58–70	6–6	Reynolds Coliseum (1,697); Raleigh, NC
December 16, 2017*; 2:00 pm		Michigan State	L 74–83 ^{OT}	6–7	J. Madison Brooks Gymnasium (1,100); Johnson City, TN
December 22, 2017*; 7:00 pm		Northern Kentucky	L 45–57	6–8	J. Madison Brooks Gymnasium (735); Johnson City, TN
December 29, 2017*; 6:00 pm		North Greenville	W 90–67	7–8	J. Madison Brooks Gymnasium (675); Johnson City, TN
SoCon Regular Season
January 4, 2018; 7:00 pm		Western Carolina	W 66–50	8–8 (1–0)	J. Madison Brooks Gymnasium (524); Johnson City, TN
January 6, 2018; 2:00 pm		UNC Greensboro	W 60–52	9–8 (2–0)	J. Madison Brooks Gymnasium (810); Johnson City, TN
January 13, 2018; 2:00 pm		Chattanooga	W 65–58	10–8 (3–0)	J. Madison Brooks Gymnasium (908); Johnson City, TN
January 18, 2018; 7:00 pm		at Furman	W 69–57	11–8 (4–0)	Timmons Arena (507); Greenville, SC
January 20, 2018; 2:00 pm		Wofford	W 61–58	12–8 (5–0)	J. Madison Brooks Gymnasium (279); Johnson City, TN
January 25, 2018; 7:00 pm		Mercer	L 65–85	12–9 (5–1)	J. Madison Brooks Gymnasium (1,022); Johnson City, TN
January 27, 2018; 2:00 pm		Samford	W 76–48	13–9 (6–1)	J. Madison Brooks Gymnasium (1,014); Johnson City, TN
February 1, 2018; 5:30 pm		at UNC Greensboro	L 61–65	13–10 (6–2)	Fleming Gymnasium (108); Greensboro, NC
February 3, 2018; 5:00 pm		at Western Carolina	W 76–46	14–10 (7–2)	Ramsey Center (644); Cullhowee, NC
February 10, 2018; 2:00 pm		at Chattanooga	W 61–55	15–10 (8–2)	McKenzie Arena (4,380); Chattanooga, TN
February 15, 2018; 11:00 am		Wofford	W 82–53	16–10 (9–2)	J. Madison Brooks Gymnasium (1,522); Johnson City, TN
February 17, 2018; 2:00 pm		Furman	W 56–46	17–10 (10–2)	J. Madison Brooks Gymnasium (1,423); Johnson City, TN
February 22, 2018; 6:00 pm		at Samford	W 64–52	18–10 (11–2)	Pete Hanna Center; Homewood, AL
February 24, 2018; 2:00 pm		at Mercer	L 48–63	18–11 (11–3)	Hawkins Arena; Macon, GA
SoCon Tournament
March 1, 2018; 3:30 pm	(2)	vs. (7) Wofford; Quarterfinals	W 78–64	19–11	U.S. Cellular Center; Asheville, NC
March 2, 2018; 1:15 pm	(2)	vs. (6) UNCG; Semifinals	W 54–52	20–11	U.S. Cellular Center; Asheville, NC
March 4, 2018; Noon	(2)	vs. (1) No. 25 Mercer; Finals	L 53–68	20–12	U.S. Cellular Center; Asheville, NC
WNIT
March 15, 2018; 7:00 pm		at James Madison; First Round	L 52–60	20–13	JMU Convocation Center; Harrisonburg, VA
*Non-conference game. ^{#}Rankings from AP Poll. (#) Tournament seedings in parentheses. All times are in Eastern Time.
