= 2018 Southern Conference women's basketball tournament =

- Classification: Division I
- Season: 2017–18
- Teams: 8
- Site: U.S. Cellular Center; Asheville, North Carolina
- Champions: Mercer (1st title)
- Winning coach: Susie Gardner (1st title)
- Television: ESPN3

2017–18 Southern Conference women's basketball standings
	Conf.				Overall
Team	W		L	PCT	W		L	PCT
No. 25 Mercer †	14	–	0	1.000	30	–	3	.909
East Tennessee State	11	–	3	.786	20	–	13	.606
Chattanooga	8	–	6	.571	17	–	13	.567
Furman	7	–	7	.500	18	–	14	.563
Samford	6	–	8	.429	15	–	16	.484
UNC Greensboro	6	–	8	.429	13	–	18	.419
Wofford	3	–	11	.214	10	–	20	.333
Western Carolina	1	–	13	.071	5	–	25	.167
† 2018 SoCon Tournament winner As of March 19, 2018

The 2018 Southern Conference women's basketball tournament was held between March 1 and 4 in Asheville, North Carolina, at the U.S. Cellular Center. Mercer defeated ETSU to claim their first-ever SoCon tournament championship.

== Seeds ==
Teams are seeded by record within the conference, with a tiebreaker system to seed teams with identical conference records.

Seed	School	Conf	Overall	Tiebreaker
#1	Mercer	14–0	27–2	
#2	ETSU	11–3	18–11	
#3	Chattanooga	8–6	17–11	
#4	Furman	7–7	17–12	
#5	Samford	6–8	14–15	2–0 vs. UNCG
#6	UNCG	6–8	12–17	
#7	Wofford	3–11	10–19	
#8	Western Carolina	1–13	5–24	

== Schedule ==
All tournament games are nationally televised on an ESPN network:

Session	Game	Time*	Matchup^{#}	Television	Attendance
Quarterfinals – Thursday, March 1
1	1	11 AM	#1 Mercer vs. #8 Western Carolina	ESPN3	
1	2	1:15 PM	#4 Furman vs. #5 Samford	ESPN3	
2	3	3:30 PM	#2 ETSU vs. #7 Wofford	ESPN3	
2	4	5:45 PM	#3 Chattanooga vs. #6 UNCG	ESPN3	
Semifinals – Friday, March 2
3	5	11:00 AM	#1 Mercer vs. #5 Samford	ESPN3	
3	6	1:15 PM	#2 ETSU vs. #6 UNCG	ESPN3	
Championship Game – Sunday, March 4
4	7	Noon	#1 Mercer vs. #2 ETSU	ESPN3	
*Game Times in EST. #-Rankings denote tournament seeding.

== Bracket ==
- All times are Eastern.

Quarterfinals; Thursday, March 1, 2018; ESPN3
1	Mercer	75
8	Western Carolina	44
4	Furman	48
5	Samford	59
2	ETSU	78
7	Wofford	64
3	Chattanooga	66
6	UNCG	70

Semifinals; Friday, March 2, 2018; ESPN3
1	Mercer	81
5	Samford	44
2	ETSU	54
6	UNCG	52

Championship game Sunday, March 4, 2018; ESPN3
1	Mercer	68
2	ETSU	53

== See also ==
- 2018 Southern Conference men's basketball tournament
