= 2017–18 Furman Paladins women's basketball team =

Intercollegiate basketball season

2017–18 Furman Paladins women's basketball

WBI, Quarterfinals
- Conference: Southern Conference
- Record: 17–13 (7–7 SoCon)
- Head coach: Jackie Carson (8th season)
- Assistant coaches: Caronica Randle; Krista Beechy; Pierre Curtis
- Home arena: Timmons Arena

2017–18 Southern Conference women's basketball standings
	Conf.				Overall
Team	W		L	PCT	W		L	PCT
No. 25 Mercer †	14	–	0	1.000	30	–	3	.909
East Tennessee State	11	–	3	.786	20	–	13	.606
Chattanooga	8	–	6	.571	17	–	13	.567
Furman	7	–	7	.500	18	–	14	.563
Samford	6	–	8	.429	15	–	16	.484
UNC Greensboro	6	–	8	.429	13	–	18	.419
Wofford	3	–	11	.214	10	–	20	.333
Western Carolina	1	–	13	.071	5	–	25	.167
† 2018 SoCon Tournament winner As of March 19, 2018

The 2017–18 Furman Paladins women's basketball team represented Furman University during the 2017–18 NCAA Division I women's basketball season. The Paladins, led by eighth-year head coach Jackie Carson, played their home games at Timmons Arena and were members of the Southern Conference. They finished the season 17–13, 7–7 in SoCon play to finish in fourth place. They lost in the quarterfinals of the Southern women's tournament to Samford. They received an invite to the WBI, where they defeated UNC Asheville in the first round before losing to South Alabama in the quarterfinals.

== Roster ==
2017–18 Furman Paladins women's basketball team
Players
Coaches

Pos.	#	Name	Height	Year	Previous school	Hometown
G	1	Milica Manojlović	5 ft 7 in (1.7 m)	Fr	Rabun Gap Nacoochee School	Tivat, Montenegro
G	2	Jarya Outten	5 ft 5 in (1.65 m)	Fr	Fort Myers	Fort Myers, FL
G	3	Stephania Oramas	5 ft 5 in (1.65 m)	Sr	Charles W. Flanagan; Hofstra/Daytona State	Pembroke Pines, FL
F	5	Sydni Donovan	6 ft 4 in (1.93 m)	Fr	Cardinal Newman	West Palm Beach, FL
G	10	Le'Jzae Davidson	5 ft 5 in (1.65 m)	So	East Nashville Magnet School	Nashville, TN
G	11	Hannah Sellinger	5 ft 9 in (1.75 m)	Fr	Byron Nelson	Trophy Club, TX
G	12	Tyah Hunter	6 ft 0 in (1.83 m)	Fr	Hopewell	Hopewell, VA
F	13	Kaitlyn Duncan	6 ft 1 in (1.85 m)	Jr	Banks County	Commerce, GA
F	14	DeAnneisha Jackson	6 ft 2 in (1.88 m)	RS Sr	Harnett Central; High Point	Angier, NC
G/F	15	Tierra Hodges	5 ft 9 in (1.75 m)	So	Alcovy	Covington, GA
F	24	Cierra Carter	5 ft 11 in (1.8 m)	Sr	Spring Valley	Columbia, SC
G	44	Taylor Petty (redshirt)	5 ft 9 in (1.75 m)	Jr	Dorman; Presbyterian	Conover, NC
F	55	Celena Taborn	6 ft 3 in (1.91 m)	Fr	Sidney	Sidney, OH

Head coach

- Jackie Carson (Furman)

Assistant coach(es)

- Pierre Curtis (James Madison)
- Caronica Randle (Central Arkansas)
- Krista Beechy (Grove City)

Legend

- (C) Team captain
- (S) Suspended
- (I) Ineligible
- (W) Walk-on
- Injured
- Current redshirt

Roster

== Schedule ==
Date time, TV	Rank^{#}	Opponent^{#}	Result	Record	Site (attendance) city, state
Exhibition
11/03/2017*; 7:00 pm		Warren Wilson	W 109–34		Timmons Arena (207); Greenville, NC
Regular season
11/12/2017*; 2:00 pm		College of Charleston	W 72–58	1–0	Timmons Arena (633); Greenville, NC
11/15/2017*; 7:00 pm, ESPN3		Davidson	W 65–62	2–0	Timmons Arena (471); Greenville, NC
11/18/2017*; 7:00 pm, ESPN3		Kennesaw State	W 78–59	3–0	Timmons Arena (214); Greenville, NC
11/20/2017*; 7:00 pm		at Gardner–Webb	L 57–71	3–1	Paul Porter Arena (691); Boiling Spring, NC
11/22/2017*; 6:00 pm		Pfeiffer	W 102–51	4–1	Timmons Arena (312); Greenville, NC
11/26/2017*; 2:00 pm		UNC Wilmington	W 76–71	5–1	Timmons Arena (318); Greenville, NC
11/30/2017*; 7:00 pm		at Georgia	L 44–79	5–2	Stegeman Coliseum (2,084); Athens, GA
12/03/2017*; 2:00 pm		at USC Upstate	W 80–59	6–2	G. B. Hodge Center (120); Spartanburg, SC
12/03/2017*; 5:00 pm		Bob Jones	W 93–46	7–2	Timmons Arena (432); Greenville, NC
12/10/2017*; 2:00 pm, ACCN Extra		at North Carolina	L 46–82	7–3	Carmichael Arena (2,268); Chapel Hill, NC
12/16/2017*; 2:30 pm		vs. Ohio; West Palm Beach Invitational	W 70–68	8–3	Student Life Center (250); West Palm Beach, FL
12/17/2017*; 6:00 pm		vs. Xavier; West Palm Beach Invitational	L 62–75	8–4	Student Life Center (125); West Palm Beach, FL
12/28/2017*; 7:00 pm		at UNC Asheville	W 71–63	9–4	Kimmel Arena (863); Asheville, NC
12/30/2017*; 7:00 pm		at Presbyterian	L 75–76 ^{OT}	9–5	Templeton Center (283); Clinton, SC
01/04/2018; 5:00 pm		Samford	W 45–41	10–5 (1–0)	Timmons Arena (484); Greenville, SC
01/06/2018; 2:00 pm, ESPN3		Mercer	L 64–86	10–6 (1–1)	Timmons Arena (527); Greenville, SC
01/11/2018; 7:00 pm, ESPN3		at Western Carolina	W 68–59	11–6 (2–1)	Ramsey Center (412); Cullowhee, NC
01/13/2018; 4:00 pm		at UNC Greensboro	L 74–76 ^{OT}	11–7 (2–2)	Fleming Gymnasium (813); Greensboro, NC
01/18/2018; 7:00 pm		East Tennessee State	L 57–69	11–8 (2–3)	Timmons Arena (507); Greenville, NC
01/20/2018; 2:00 pm		Chattanooga	W 58–57	12–8 (3–3)	Timmons Arena (662); Greenville, NC
01/22/2018*; 7:00 pm		Converse	W 80–41	13–8	Timmons Arena (472); Greenville, NC
01/27/2018; 2:00 pm		at Wofford	L 48–79	13–9 (3–4)	Jerry Richardson Indoor Stadium (418); Spartanburg, SC
02/01/2018; 2:00 pm, ESPN3		at Mercer	L 53–65	13–10 (3–5)	Hawkins Arena (1,427); Macon, GA
02/03/2018; 3:00 pm		at Samford	L 58–62 ^{OT}	13–11 (3–6)	Pete Hanna Center (477); Birmingham, AL
02/08/2018; 4:00 pm		UNC Greensboro	W 55–54	14–11 (4–6)	Timmons Arena (813); Greenville, SC
02/10/2018; 2:00 pm, ESPN3		Western Carolina	W 66–46	15–11 (5–6)	Timmons Arena (1,268); Greenville, SC
02/15/2018; 6:30 pm		at Chattanooga	W 50–45	16–11 (6–6)	McKenzie Arena (1,423); Chattanooga, TN
02/17/2018; 2:00 pm		at East Tennessee State	L 46–56	16–12 (6–7)	J. Madison Brooks Gymnasium (1,423); Johnson City, TN
01/27/2018; 2:00 pm		Wofford	W 63–57	17–12 (7–7)	Timmons Arena (716); Greenville, NC
SoCon Tournament
03/01/2018; 1:15 pm	(4)	vs. (5) Samford; Quarterfinals	L 58–59	17–13	U.S. Cellular Center; Asheville, NC
WBI
03/15/2018*; 7:00 pm		at UNC Asheville; First Round	W 65–64	18–13	Kimmel Arena (863); Asheville, NC
03/19/2018*; 8:00 pm		at South Alabama; Quarterfinals	L 53–54	18–14	Mitchell Center (802); Mobile, AL
*Non-conference game. ^{#}Rankings from AP Poll. (#) Tournament seedings in parentheses. All times are in Eastern Time.

== See also ==
- 2017–18 Furman Paladins men's basketball team
