= 2016–17 Chattanooga Mocs women's basketball team =

Intercollegiate basketball season

2016–17 Chattanooga Mocs women's basketball

SoCon regular season co-champions & tournament champions

NCAA Women's Tournament, first round
- Conference: Southern Conference
- Record: 21–11 (12–2 SoCon)
- Head coach: Jim Foster (4th season)
- Assistant coaches: Katie Burrows; Brittany Jonson; John McCray
- Home arena: McKenzie Arena

2016–17 Southern Conference women's basketball standings
	Conf.				Overall
Team	W		L	PCT	W		L	PCT
Mercer	12	–	2	.857	25	–	6	.806
Chattanooga*^{†}	12	–	2	.857	21	–	10	.677
East Tennessee State	8	–	6	.571	16	–	14	.533
UNC Greensboro	7	–	7	.500	17	–	14	.548
Furman	7	–	7	.500	14	–	17	.452
Samford	4	–	10	.286	12	–	19	.387
Wofford	3	–	11	.214	13	–	17	.433
Western Carolina	3	–	11	.214	8	–	22	.267
† 2017 SoCon Tournament winner * Tournament #1 seed

The 2016–17 Chattanooga Mocs women's basketball team represented the University of Tennessee at Chattanooga during the 2016–17 NCAA Division I women's basketball season. The Mocs, led by fourth-year head coach Jim Foster, play their home games at the McKenzie Arena and are members of the Southern Conference. The team was regular season and tournament champions at 21–10 (12–2).

== Roster ==
2016–17 Chattanooga Mocs basketball team women's basketball team
Players
Coaches

Pos.	#	Name	Height	Year	Hometown
F/C	3	Jasmine Joyner	6 ft 2 in (1.88 m)	Sr	Southaven, MS
G	5	Anna Claire Noblit	5 ft 7 in (1.7 m)	Jr	Tuscumbia, AL
F	10	Queen Alford (redshirt)	5 ft 10 in (1.78 m)	Sr	Decatur, GA
G	14	Molly Melton	5 ft 4 in (1.63 m)	So	Knoxville, TN
G/F	20	Keiana Gilbert	5 ft 11 in (1.8 m)	Jr	Columbia, TN
G/F	21	Sydney Vanlandingham (redshirt)	5 ft 11 in (1.8 m)	Sr	Hermitage, TN
G	22	Shelby Davenport	6 ft 0 in (1.83 m)	So	Murfreesboro, TN
G	23	Moses Johnson	6 ft 0 in (1.83 m)	Sr	Atlanta, GA
G	24	Nakeia Burks	5 ft 10 in (1.78 m)	So	Huntsville, AL
G	25	Chelsey Schumpert	5 ft 4 in (1.63 m)	Jr	Paducah, KY
F/C	30	Ansley Chilton (redshirt)	6 ft 3 in (1.91 m)	Jr	Trenton, GA
G	33	Laklyn Bouldin (redshirt)	5 ft 9 in (1.75 m)	Fr	Spencer, TN
G/F	35	Aryanna Gilbert (redshirt)	5 ft 9 in (1.75 m)	Jr	Pulaski, TN
F/C	41	Ashlyn Wert (redshirt)	6 ft 5 in (1.96 m)	Fr	Lancaster, PA

Head coach

- Jim Foster (Temple)

Assistant coach(es)

- Katie Burrows (Chattanooga)
- Brittany Jonson (Ohio State)
- John McCray (Ohio State)
- Brianna Sanders, DO (Ohio State)
- Jon Goldberg, Dir. SA Dev. (Emerson)
- Alicia Payne, GA (Chattanooga)

Legend

- (C) Team captain
- (S) Suspended
- (I) Ineligible
- (W) Walk-on
- Injured
- Current redshirt

Roster

== Schedule ==
Date time, TV	Rank^{#}	Opponent^{#}	Result	Record	Site (attendance) city, state
Non-conference regular season
November 11, 2016*; 2:00 pm		at Rutgers	W 66–53	1–0	Louis Brown Athletic Center (1,547); Piscataway, NJ
November 14, 2016*; 6:30 pm		No. 20 Florida	L 61–72	1–1	McKenzie Arena (2,427); Chattanooga, TN
November 17, 2016*; 6:30 pm		No. 23 Indiana	L 76–79	1–2	McKenzie Arena (1,709); Chattanooga, TN
November 19, 2016*; 2:00 pm		vs. Lafayette; Hall of Fame Women's Challenge	W 68–43	2–2	KFC Yum! Center; Louisville, KY
November 20, 2016*; 2:00 pm		vs. Bowling Green; Hall of Fame Women's Challenge	W 54–49	3–2	KFC Yum! Center; Louisville, KY
November 21, 2016*; 7:00 pm		at No. 4 Louisville; Hall of Fame Women's Challenge	L 47–63	3–3	KFC Yum! Center (7,719); Louisville, KY
November 25, 2016*; 2:00 pm		Green Bay	L 55–71	3–4	McKenzie Arena (1,557); Chattanooga, TN
November 27, 2016*; 6:00 pm		vs. Maine; Hall of Fame Women's Challenge	L 39–49	3–5	MassMutual Center (1,812); Springfield, MA
November 29, 2016*; 7:00 pm, SNY		at No. 2 Connecticut	L 43–80	3–6	XL Center (6,090); Hartford, CT
December 3, 2016*; 7:00 pm		at UT Martin	W 80–60	4–6	Skyhawk Arena (1,123); Martin, TN
December 5, 2016*; 6:30 pm		Stetson	W 66–55	5–6	McKenzie Arena (1,514); Chattanooga, TN
December 20, 2016*; 7:00 pm, ESPN3		at Florida Gulf Coast	L 55–68	5–7	Alico Arena (1,014); Fort Myers, FL
December 27, 2016*; 6:30 pm		No. 2 Notre Dame	L 58–79	5–8	McKenzie Arena (3,388); Chattanooga, TN
December 30, 2016*; 2:00 pm		at Presbyterian	W 56–48	6–8	Templeton Physical Education Center (243); Clinton, SC
SoCon Regular Season
January 4, 2017; 7:00 pm		at Samford	W 77–61	7–8 (1–0)	Pete Hanna Center (312); Homewood, AL
January 7, 2017; 2:00 pm		at Mercer	W 74–56	8–8 (2–0)	Hawkins Arena (1,575); Macon, GA
January 14, 2017; 2:00 pm		East Tennessee State	W 60–45	9–8 (3–0)	McKenzie Arena (1,641); Chattanooga, TN
January 19, 2017; 6:30 pm		Western Carolina	W 67–46	10–8 (4–0)	McKenzie Arena (1,498); Chattanooga, TN
January 21, 2016; 2:00 pm		UNC Greensboro	W 58–55	11–8 (5–0)	McKenzie Arena (4,644); Chattanooga, TN
January 26, 2017; 11:00 am		at Wofford	W 71–61	12–8 (6–0)	Benjamin Johnson Arena (1,872); Spartanburg, SC
January 28, 2017; 2:00 pm		at Furman	L 48–65	12–9 (6–1)	Timmons Arena (468); Greenville, SC
February 2, 2017; 5:30 pm		Mercer	W 70–50	13–9 (7–1)	McKenzie Arena (4,364); Chattanooga, TN
February 6, 2017; 2:00 pm		Samford	W 74–56	14–9 (8–1)	McKenzie Arena (1,575); Chattanooga, TN
February 10, 2017; 7:00 pm		at East Tennessee State	W 70–62	15–9 (9–1)	Freedom Hall Civic Center (1,316); Johnson City, TN
February 16, 2017; 7:00 pm		at UNC Greensboro	L 72–75 ^{OT}	15–10 (9–2)	Fleming Gymnasium (407); Greensboro, NC
February 18, 2017; 2:00 pm		at Western Carolina	W 60–48	16–10 (10–2)	Ramsey Center (525); Cullhowee, NC
February 23, 2017; 6:30 pm		Furman	W 66–43	17–10 (11–2)	McKenzie Arena (1,501); Chattanooga, TN
February 25, 2017; 2:00 pm		Wofford	W 76–56	18–10 (12–2)	McKenzie Arena; Chattanooga, TN
SoCon Tournament
March 2, 2017; 11:30 am, ESPN3	(1)	vs. (8) Western Carolina; Quarterfinals	W 85–41	19–10	U.S. Cellular Center (3,193); Asheville, NC
March 3, 2017; 11:00 am, ESPN3	(1)	vs. (4) UNC Greensboro; Semifinals	W 75–53	20–10	U.S. Cellular Center (3,329); Asheville, NC
March 5, 2017; 1:00 pm, ESPN3	(1)	vs. (2) Mercer; Championship Game	W 61–59	21–10	U.S. Cellular Center (908); Asheville, NC
NCAA Women's Tournament
March 18, 2017*; 1:30 pm, ESPN2	(13 O)	at (3 O) Louisville; 1st Round	L 62–82	21–11	KFC Yum! Center; Louisville, KY
*Non-conference game. ^{#}Rankings from AP Poll. (#) Tournament seedings in parentheses. O=Oklahoma Region. All times are in Eastern Time.
