= 2016 Southern Conference women's basketball tournament =

- Classification: Division I
- Season: 2015–16
- Teams: 8
- Site: U.S. Cellular Center; Asheville, North Carolina
- Champions: Chattanooga (17th title)
- Winning coach: Jim Foster (3rd title)
- MVP: Alicia Payne (Chattanooga)
- Television: ESPN3

2015–16 Southern Conference women's basketball standings
	Conf.				Overall
Team	W		L	PCT	W		L	PCT
Chattanooga †	12	–	2	.857	24	–	8	.750
Mercer*	12	–	2	.857	24	–	9	.727
Samford	11	–	3	.786	20	–	11	.645
East Tennessee State	8	–	6	.571	16	–	14	.533
Furman	7	–	7	.500	15	–	16	.484
Wofford	3	–	11	.214	9	–	20	.310
Western Carolina	3	–	11	.214	6	–	22	.214
UNC Greensboro	0	–	14	.000	8	–	22	.267
† 2016 SoCon Tournament winner As of March 18, 2016; Rankings from AP poll

The 2016 Southern Conference women's basketball tournament was held between Thursday, March 3 and Sunday, March 6 in Asheville, North Carolina, at the U.S. Cellular Center.

== Seeds ==
Teams are seeded by record within the conference, with a tiebreaker system to seed teams with identical conference records.

Seed	School	Conf (Overall)	Tiebreaker
#1	Mercer	12–2 (22–7)	1–1 vs. Chattanooga; 2–0 vs. Samford
#2	Chattanooga	12–2 (21–7)	1–1 vs. Mercer; 1–1 vs. Samford
#3	Samford	11–3 (19–10)	
#4	East Tennessee State	8–6 (16–13)	
#5	Furman	7–7 (14–15)	
#6	Wofford	3–11 (9–19)	1–1 vs. Western Carolina; higher RPI
#7	Western Carolina	3–11 (6–21)	1–1 vs. Wofford
#8	UNC Greensboro	0–14 (8–21)	

== Schedule ==
All tournament games are nationally televised on an ESPN network:

Session	Game	Time*	Matchup^{#}	Television	Attendance
Quarterfinals – Thursday, March 3
2	1	11:30 AM	#1 Mercer vs. #8 UNC Greensboro	ESPN3	
2	2	1:45 PM	#4 East Tennessee State vs. #5 Furman	ESPN3	
3	6	4:00 PM	#2 Chattanooga vs. #7 Western Carolina	ESPN3	2,577
3	3	6:15 PM	#3 Samford vs. #6 Wofford	ESPN3	2,577
Semifinals – Friday, March 4
4	4	11:00 AM	#1 Mercer vs. #5 Furman	ESPN3	
4	5	1:15 PM	#2 Chattanooga vs. #3 Samford	ESPN3	
Championship Game – Sunday, March 6
6	10	1:00 PM	#1 Mercer vs. #2 Chattanooga	ESPN3	1,320
*Game Times in EST. #-Rankings denote tournament seeding.

== Bracket ==
Quarterfinals; Thursday, March 3, 2016
1	Mercer	75
8	UNC Greensboro	53
4	East Tennessee State	68
5	Furman	71
2	Chattanooga	74
7	Western Carolina	56
3	Samford	63
6	Wofford	43

Semifinals; Friday, March 4, 2016
1	Mercer	64
5	Furman	50
2	Chattanooga	49
3	Samford	41

Championship game Sunday, March 6, 2016
1	Mercer	57
2	Chattanooga	65
