= 1988 NAIA women's basketball tournament =

- Teams: 16
- Finals site: , Kansas City, Missouri
- Champions: Oklahoma City Chiefs (1st title, 1st title game, 1st Fab Four)
- Runner-up: Claflin Lady Panthers (1st title game, 1st Fab Four)
- Semifinalists: Arkansas Tech Golden Suns (2nd Fab Four); Wingate Bulldogs (1st Fab Four)
- Coach of the year: Bob Colon (Oklahoma City)
- Charles Stevenson Hustle Award: Kala Cooley (Arkansas Tech)
- Chuck Taylor MVP: Miriam Walker (Claflin)
- Top scorer: Miriam Walker (Claflin) (164 points)

The 1988 NAIA women's basketball tournament was the eighth annual tournament held by the NAIA to determine the national champion of women's college basketball among its members in the United States and Canada.

Oklahoma City defeated Claflin in the championship game, 113–95, to claim the Chiefs' first NAIA national title.

The tournament was played in Kansas City, Missouri.

== Qualification ==
The tournament field remained fixed at sixteen teams, with seeds assigned to the top eight teams.

The tournament utilized a simple single-elimination format, with an additional third-place game for the two teams that lost in the semifinals.

== Bracket ==
Round of 16
1	Wingate	86
Charleston (WV)	71
Central Washington	68
8	Union (TN)	91
5	St. Ambrose	85
Rocky Mountain	65
St. Joseph's (ME)	84
4	Oklahoma City	99
3	Arkansas Tech	62
Southern Utah	50
Minnesota Duluth	72*
6	Wayland Baptist	70
7	Saginaw Valley	70
Dillard	104
Cumberland	84
2	Claflin	88*

Quarterfinals
1	Wingate	83
8	Union (TN)	81
5	St. Ambrose	72
4	Oklahoma City	75
3	Arkansas Tech	65
Minnesota Duluth	63
Dillard	88
2	Claflin	107

Semifinals
1	Wingate	74
4	Oklahoma City	76
3	Arkansas Tech	74
2	Claflin	80

National championship
4	Oklahoma City	113
2	Claflin	95
National third place
1	Wingate	81
3	Arkansas Tech	86*

== See also ==
- 1988 NCAA Division I women's basketball tournament
- 1988 NCAA Division II women's basketball tournament
- 1988 NCAA Division III women's basketball tournament
- 1988 NAIA men's basketball tournament
