= 2017 Southern Conference women's basketball tournament =

- Classification: Division I
- Season: 2016–17
- Teams: 8
- Site: U.S. Cellular Center; Asheville, North Carolina
- Champions: Chattanooga (18th title)
- Winning coach: Jim Foster (4th title)
- MVP: Jasmine Joyner (Chattanooga)
- Television: ESPN3

2016–17 Southern Conference women's basketball standings
	Conf.				Overall
Team	W		L	PCT	W		L	PCT
Mercer	12	–	2	.857	25	–	6	.806
Chattanooga*^{†}	12	–	2	.857	21	–	10	.677
East Tennessee State	8	–	6	.571	16	–	14	.533
UNC Greensboro	7	–	7	.500	17	–	14	.548
Furman	7	–	7	.500	14	–	17	.452
Samford	4	–	10	.286	12	–	19	.387
Wofford	3	–	11	.214	13	–	17	.433
Western Carolina	3	–	11	.214	8	–	22	.267
† 2017 SoCon Tournament winner * Tournament #1 seed

The 2017 Southern Conference women's basketball tournament was held between Thursday, March 2 and Sunday, March 5 in Asheville, North Carolina, at the U.S. Cellular Center.

== Seeds ==
Teams are seeded by record within the conference, with a tiebreaker system to seed teams with identical conference records.

Seed	School	Conf	Overall	Tiebreaker
#1	Chattanooga	12–2	20–10	2–0 vs. Mercer
#2	Mercer	12–2	25–5	0–2 vs. Chattanooga
#3	East Tennessee State	8–6	16–14	
#4	UNC Greensboro	7–7	17–14	1–1 vs. Fur, 1–1 vs. ETSU
#5	Furman	7–7	14–17	1–1 vs. UNCG, 0–2 vs. ETSU
#6	Samford	4–10	12–19	
#7	Wofford	3–11	13–17	1–1 vs. WCU, 1–1 vs. ETSU
#8	Western Carolina	3–11	8–22	1–1 vs. Woff, 0–2 vs. ETSU

== Schedule ==
All tournament games are nationally televised on an ESPN network:

Session	Game	Time*	Matchup^{#}	Television	Attendance
Quarterfinals – Thursday, March 2
1	1	11:30 AM	#1 Chattanooga vs. #8 Western Carolina	ESPN3	3,193
1	2	1:45 PM	#4 UNC Greensboro vs. #5 Furman	ESPN3	3,193
2	3	4:00 PM	#2 Mercer vs. #7 Wofford	ESPN3	3,193
2	4	6:15 PM	#3 East Tennessee State vs. #6 Samford	ESPN3	3,193
Semifinals – Friday, March 3
3	5	11:00 AM	#1 Chattanooga vs. #4 UNC Greensboro	ESPN3	3,329
3	6	1:15 PM	#2 Mercer vs. #6 Samford	ESPN3	3,329
Championship Game – Sunday, March 5
4	7	1:00 PM	#1 Chattanooga vs. #2 Mercer	ESPN3	
*Game Times in EST. #-Rankings denote tournament seeding.

== Bracket ==
Quarterfinals; Thursday, March 2, 2017
1	Chattanooga	85
8	Western Carolina	41
4	UNC Greensboro	68
5	Furman	63
2	Mercer	67
7	Wofford	42
3	East Tennessee State	64
6	Samford	67

Semifinals; Friday, March 3, 2017
1	Chattanooga	75
4	UNC Greensboro	53
2	Mercer	63
6	Samford	52

Championship game Sunday, March 5, 2017
1	Chattanooga	61
2	Mercer	59

== All-Tournament teams ==
First Team

- Tianna Tarter, ETSU
- KeKe Calloway, Mercer
- Kahlia Lawrence, Mercer
- Sydni Means, Mercer
- Jasmine Joyner, Chattanooga

Second Team

- Cierra Carter, Furman
- Mangela Ngandjui, UNCG
- Nadine Soliman, UNCG
- Lakelyn Bouldin, Chattanooga
- Chelsey Shumpert, Chattanooga

Most Outstanding Player

- Jasmine Joyner, Chattanooga

== See also ==
- 2017 Southern Conference men's basketball tournament
