= 2017–18 Mercer Bears women's basketball team =

Intercollegiate basketball season

2017–18 Mercer Bears women's basketball

SoCon Regular Season and Tournament Champions

NCAA Women's Tournament, first round
- Conference: Southern Conference

Ranking
- AP: No. 25
- Record: 30–3 (14–0 SoCon)
- Head coach: Susie Gardner (8th season)
- Assistant coaches: Tiffany Morton; Trelanne Powell; Ben Wierzba
- Home arena: Hawkins Arena

2017–18 Southern Conference women's basketball standings
	Conf.				Overall
Team	W		L	PCT	W		L	PCT
No. 25 Mercer †	14	–	0	1.000	30	–	3	.909
East Tennessee State	11	–	3	.786	20	–	13	.606
Chattanooga	8	–	6	.571	17	–	13	.567
Furman	7	–	7	.500	18	–	14	.563
Samford	6	–	8	.429	15	–	16	.484
UNC Greensboro	6	–	8	.429	13	–	18	.419
Wofford	3	–	11	.214	10	–	20	.333
Western Carolina	1	–	13	.071	5	–	25	.167
† 2018 SoCon Tournament winner As of March 19, 2018

The 2017–18 Mercer Bears women's basketball team represented Mercer University during the 2017–18 NCAA Division I women's basketball season. The Bears, led by eighth-year head coach Susie Gardner, played their home games at the Hawkins Arena as members of the Southern Conference (SoCon). They finished the season 30–3, 14–0 in Southern Conference play to win the Southern Conference regular season. They won the SoCon women's tournament for the first time in school history and earned their first automatic trip to the NCAA women's tournament, where they lost to Georgia in the first round.

== Roster ==
2017–18 Mercer Bears women's basketball team
Players
Coaches

Pos.	#	Name	Height	Year	Previous school	Hometown
G	0	Keke Calloway	5 ft 9 in (1.75 m)	Jr	Mary Persons	Forsyth, GA
G	1	Sydni Means	5 ft 5 in (1.65 m)	Sr	Greater Atlanta Christian School	Stone Mountain, GA
G/F	2	Amanda Thompson	5 ft 10 in (1.78 m)	Jr	Hayesville	Nayesville, NC
C	5	Lakaitlin Wright	6 ft 3 in (1.91 m)	Fr	Wheeler County	Alamo, GA
G	11	Linnea Rosendal	6 ft 1 in (1.85 m)	Jr		Stockholm, Sweden
G/F	12	Shannon Titus	5 ft 11 in (1.8 m)	Fr	Northview	Johns Creek, GA
F	15	Ally Welch	5 ft 11 in (1.8 m)	Jr	South Forsyth	Cumming, GA
G	20	Shon Kitchens	5 ft 7 in (1.7 m)	Sr	Washington County	Davisboro, GA
F	22	Alex Williams	5 ft 9 in (1.75 m)	Sr	Woodward Academy	College Park, GA
G	23	Kayla Potts	5 ft 10 in (1.78 m)	Sr	Forest Park	Rex, GA
G	24	Kahlia Lawrence	5 ft 8 in (1.73 m)	Sr	Kendrick	Columbus, GA
C	32	Germani Abram	6 ft 2 in (1.88 m)	So	Columbia	Huntsville, AL
C	34	Rachel Selph	6 ft 3 in (1.91 m)	Jr	Dodge County	Eastman, GA

Head coach

- Susie Gardner (Georgia)

Assistant coach(es)

- Tiffany Morton (UW–Whitewater)
- Trelanne Powell (Columbus State)
- Ben Wierzba (SIU Edwardsville)

Legend

- (C) Team captain
- (S) Suspended
- (I) Ineligible
- (W) Walk-on
- Injured
- Current redshirt

Roster

== Schedule ==
Date time, TV	Rank^{#}	Opponent^{#}	Result	Record	Site (attendance) city, state
Non-conference regular season
11/10/2017*; 5:30 pm		at UCF	W 74–63	1–0	CFE Arena (3,574); Orlando, FL
11/12/2017*; 2:00 pm		at Florida Atlantic	W 66–55	2–0	FAU Arena (587); Boca Raton, FL
11/16/2017*; 7:00 pm, ESPN3		Georgia Southern	W 72–45	3–0	Hawkins Arena (1,172); Macon, GA
11/19/2017*; 2:00 pm, ESPN3		Georgia	L 54–72	3–1	Hawkins Arena (2,731); Macon, GA
11/24/2017*; 6:00 pm		vs. Western Kentucky; GSU Thanksgiving Classic	L 62–67	3–2	GSU Sports Arena (401); Atlanta, GA
11/26/2017*; 5:00 pm		vs. VCU; GSU Thanksgiving Classic	W 70–54	4–2	GSU Sports Arena (331); Atlanta, GA
11/30/2017*; 7:00 pm		at Campbell	W 58–57	5–2	Gore Arena (876); Buies Creek, NC
12/03/2017*; 2:00 pm, ESPN3		Davidson	W 69–54	6–2	Hawkins Arena (832); Macon, GA
12/06/2017*; 7:00 pm, ESPN3		George Washington	W 61–44	7–2	Hawkins Arena (852); Macon, GA
12/10/2017*; 1:00 pm		at UNC Asheville	W 67–56	8–2	Kimmel Arena (1,081); Asheville, NC
12/17/2017*; 2:00 pm		Winthrop	W 93–45	9–2	Hawkins Arena (634); Macon, GA
12/19/2017*; 7:00 pm, ESPN3		South Carolina State	W 74–53	10–2	Hawkins Arena (679); Macon, GA
12/21/2017*; 7:00 pm, ESPN3		Howard	W 70–44	11–2	Hawkins Arena (749); Macon, GA
12/28/2017*; 2:00 pm, ACCN Extra		at North Carolina	W 97–86	12–2	Carmichael Arena (2,988); Chapel Hill, NC
12/30/2017*; 4:00 pm		at Charlotte	W 90–74	13–2	Dale F. Halton Arena (863); Charlotte, NC
SoCon regular season
01/04/2018; 3:00 pm, ESPN3		at Wofford	W 71–46	14–2 (1–0)	Jerry Richardson Indoor Stadium (342); Spartanburg, SC
01/06/2018; 2:00 pm, ESPN3		at Furman	W 86–64	15–2 (2–0)	Timmons Arena (527); Greenville, SC
01/13/2018; 3:00 pm, ESPN3		at Samford	W 73–59	16–2 (3–0)	Pete Hanna Center (293); Birmingham, AL
01/18/2018; 7:00 pm, ESPN3		UNC Greensboro	W 80–57	17–2 (4–0)	Hawkins Arena (1,827); Macon, GA
01/20/2018; 2:00 pm, ESPN3		Western Carolina	W 72–50	18–2 (5–0)	Hawkins Arena (1,821); Macon, GA
01/25/2018; 7:00 pm, ESPN3		at East Tennessee State	W 85–65	19–2 (6–0)	J. Madison Brooks Gymnasium (1,022); Johnson City, TN
01/27/2018; 2:00 pm, ESPN3		at Chattanooga	W 71–50	20–2 (7–0)	McKenzie Arena; Chattanooga, TN
02/01/2018; 5:00 pm, ESPN3		at Furman	W 65–53	21–2 (8–0)	Hawkins Arena (1,427); Macon, GA
02/03/2018; 2:00 pm, ESPN3		Wofford	W 80–39	22–2 (9–0)	Hawkins Arena (2,327); Macon, GA
02/10/2018; 2:00 pm, ESPN3		Samford	W 48–45	23–2 (10–0)	Hawkins Arena (1,424); Macon, GA
02/15/2018; 5:00 pm, ESPN3		at Western Carolina	W 53–46	24–2 (11–0)	Ramsey Center (621); Cullowhee, NC
02/17/2018; 4:00 pm		at UNC Greensboro	W 57–54	25–2 (12–0)	Fleming Gymnasium (416); Greensboro, NC
02/22/2018; 7:00 pm, ESPN3		Chattanooga	W 65–56	26–2 (13–0)	Hawkins Arena (1,672); Macon, GA
02/24/2018; 2:00 pm, ESPN3		East Tennessee State	W 63–48	27–2 (14–0)	Hawkins Arena (1,821); Macon, GA
SoCon Tournament
03/01/2018; 11:00 am, ESPN3	(1) No. 25	vs. (8) Western Carolina; Quarterfinals	W 75–44	28–2	U.S. Cellular Center; Asheville, NC
03/02/2018; 11:00 am, ESPN3	(1) No. 25	vs. (5) Samford; Semifinals	W 81–44	29–2	U.S. Cellular Center; Asheville, NC
03/04/2018; 12:00 pm, ESPN3	(1) No. 25	vs. (2) East Tennessee State; Championship Game	W 68–53	30–2	U.S. Cellular Center; Asheville, NC
NCAA Women's Tournament
03/17/2018*; 1:30 pm, ESPN2	(13 A) No. 25	at (4 A) No. 18 Georgia; First Round	L 63–68	30–3	Stegeman Coliseum (3,457); Athens, GA
*Non-conference game. ^{#}Rankings from AP Poll. (#) Tournament seedings in parentheses. A=Albany Region. All times are in Eastern Time.

== Rankings ==
+ Regular season polls	Poll	Pre- season	Week 2	Week 3	Week 4	Week 5	Week 6	Week 7	Week 8	Week 9	Week 10	Week 11	Week 12	Week 13	Week 14	Week 15	Week 16	Week 17	Week 18	Week 19	Final
AP										RV	RV	RV	RV	RV	RV	RV	25	25	25	N/A	
Coaches		N/A										RV	RV	RV	RV	25	25	23	24	RV	

Legend
	Increase in ranking
	Decrease in ranking
	Not ranked previous week
(RV)	Received votes
(NR)	Not ranked
