= 1988 NCAA Division III women's basketball tournament =

- Teams: 32
- Finals site: , Moorhead, Minnesota
- Champions: Concordia Cobbers (1st NCAA title)
- Runner-up: St. John Fisher Cardinals (1st title game)
- Third place: UNC Greensboro Spartans (2nd Final Four)
- Fourth place: Southern Maine Huskies (1st Final Four)
- Winning coach: Duane Siverson (1st title)

The 1988 NCAA Division III women's basketball tournament was the seventh annual tournament hosted by the NCAA to determine the national champion of Division III women's collegiate basketball in the United States.

Concordia Moorhead defeated St. John Fisher in the championship game, 65–57, to claim the Cobbers' first NCAA Division III national title and second overall.

The championship rounds were hosted by Concordia College in Moorhead, Minnesota.

== Bracket ==
=== First round ===
- St. John Fisher 88, SUNY Cortland 69
- Nazareth 79, Buffalo St. 76
- Ohio Northern 66, Rowan 53
- TCNJ 74, Kean 73
- Elizabethtown 71, Thiel 55
- Frank. & Marsh. 75, Lycoming 59
- Salem St. 80, Western Conn. St. 77 (OT)
- Southern Me. 68, Emmanuel (MA) 61
- Rust 83, Va. Wesleyan 49
- UNC Greensboro 81, Centre 77
- Washington-St. Louis 68, North Park 61
- Luther 53, William Penn 50
- St. Norbert 79, Wis.-River Falls 78
- Wis.-La Crosse 68, Calvin 65
- Concordia-M’head 85, Cal St. San B’dino 61
- St. Thomas (MN) 68, Stanislaus St. 62

=== Regional finals ===
- St. John Fisher 77, Nazareth 49
- Ohio Northern 73, TCNJ 58
- Frank. & Marsh. 68, Elizabethtown 65
- Southern Me. 60, Salem St. 56
- UNC Greensboro 66, Rust 64
- Luther 58, Washington-St. Louis 54
- Wis.-La Crosse 83, St. Norbert 81
- Concordia-M’head 77, St. Thomas (MN) 58

=== National finals ===
Elite Eight
St. John Fisher	74
Ohio Northern	57
Southern Maine	73
Franklin & Marshall	52
UNC Greensboro	55
Luther	52
Concordia Moorhead	85
Wisconsin–La Crosse	68

Final Four
St. John Fisher	70
Southern Maine	53
UNC Greensboro	66
Concordia–Moorhead	103

National championship
St. John Fisher	57
Concordia–Moorhead	65
Third place
Southern Maine	66
UNC Greensboro	68

== All-tournament team ==
- Jessica Beachy, Concordia–Moorhead
- Jillayn Quaschnick, Concordia–Moorhead
- Michelle Thykeson, Concordia–Moorhead
- Diana Duff, Southern Maine
- Shelly Bayhurst, St. John Fisher

== See also ==
- 1988 NCAA Division III men's basketball tournament
- 1988 NCAA Division I women's basketball tournament
- 1988 NCAA Division II women's basketball tournament
- 1988 NAIA women's basketball tournament
