= Brittney Ezell =

American basketball coach (born 1976)

Biographical details
- Born: January 18, 1976 (age 50); Franklin, Tennessee, U.S.

Playing career
- 1994–98: Alabama
- Positions: Basketball: Point guard Softball: 3rd base & shortstop

Coaching career (HC unless noted)
- 2000–2005: University of Alabama (asst.)
- 2005–2008: Okaloosa-Walton Junior College
- 2008–2010: University of Montevallo
- 2010–2013: Belmont University
- 2013–2021: East Tennessee State University

Head coaching record
- Overall: 156–214 (.422)

Brittney Ezell (born January 18, 1976) is a women’s college basketball coach, lastly as the head coach of the East Tennessee State Buccaneers women's basketball team. Ezell had previously been the coach of Montevallo University and Belmont University in Nashville, Tennessee.

== Alabama statistics ==
Legend
GP	Games played	GS	Games started	MPG	Minutes per game
FG%	Field goal percentage	3P%	3-point field goal percentage	FT%	Free throw percentage
RPG	Rebounds per game	APG	Assists per game	SPG	Steals per game
BPG	Blocks per game	PPG	Points per game	**Bold**	Career high

Year	Team	GP	GS	FG	FGA	FG%	3FG	3FGA	3PA%	FT	FTA	FT%	RBG	APG	BPG	SPG	Points	PPG
1994–95	Alabama	31	26	58	182	31.9%	35	121	28.9%	59	86	68.6%	**3.13**	2.48	**0.10**	0.74	210	6.77
1995–96	Alabama	32	31	81	249	32.5%	53	170	31.2%	46	77	59.7%	2.63	5.63	0.00	1.44	261	8.16
1996–97	Alabama	31	30	50	188	26.6%	43	144	29.9%	37	50	**75.0%**	2.13	4.61	0.03	1.32	180	5.81
1997–98	Alabama	**34**	**34**	**109**	**294**	**37.1%**	**70**	**207**	**33.8%**	**85**	**128**	66.4%	3.12	**6.47**	0.06	**1.65**	**373**	**10.97**
Career		128	121	298	913	32.6%	201	642	31.3%	227	341	66.6%	2.76	4.84	0.05	1.30	1024	8.00

== Head coaching record ==
Record table
Season	Team	Overall	Conference	Standing	Postseason
Montevallo University (Gulf South Conference) (2008–2009)
2008–09	Montevallo	8–20	4–8	5th East	
Montevallo University (Peach Belt Conference) (2009–2010)
2009–10	Montevallo	14–13	7–10	T-4th West	
Montevallo:		22–33 (.400)	11–18 (.379)		
Belmont University (Atlantic Sun Conference) (2010–2012)
2010–11	Belmont	11–20	7–13	8th	
2011–12	Belmont	12–18	11–7	3rd	
Belmont University (Ohio Valley Conference) (2012–2013)
2012–13	Belmont	18–14	11–5	T-2nd East	WBI First Round
Belmont:		41–52 (.441)	29–25 (.537)		
East Tennessee State University (Atlantic Sun Conference) (2013–2014)
2013–14	East Tennessee State	9–21	5–13	7th	
East Tennessee State (Atlantic Sun):		9–21 (.300)	5–13 (.278)		
East Tennessee State University (Southern Conference) (2014–2021)
2014–15	East Tennessee State	21–12	11–3	2nd	WNIT First Round
2015–16	East Tennessee State	16–14	8–6	4th	
2016–17	East Tennessee State	16–14	8–6	3rd	
2017–18	East Tennessee State	18–10	11–2	2nd	
2018–19	East Tennessee State	10–21	8–6	T–3rd	
2019–20	East Tennessee State	9–21	4–10	T–6th	
2020–21	East Tennessee State	4–16	1–10	8th	
East Tennessee State (SOCON):		84–108 (.438)	52–43 (.547)		
East Tennessee State:		93–129 (.419)	57–56 (.504)		
Total:		156–214 (.422)			
National champion Postseason invitational champion Conference regular season champion Conference regular season and conference tournament champion Division regular season champion Division regular season and conference tournament champion Conference tournament champion
