= List of former Southern Conference members =

This is a list of former members of the National Collegiate Athletic Association (NCAA) Division I Southern Conference (SoCon). Most former members are currently members of either the Southeastern Conference or the Atlantic Coast Conference.

Two of the former full members, Appalachian State and Davidson, maintain SoCon associate membership in wrestling. A third former full member, Georgia Southern, became an associate member in rifle when the SoCon added the sport for the 2016–17 school year.

| Institution | Location | Founded | Nickname | Joined | Left | Current Conference |
|---|---|---|---|---|---|---|
| University of Alabama | Tuscaloosa, Alabama | 1831 | Crimson Tide | 1921 | 1932 | Southeastern |
| Appalachian State University | Boone, North Carolina | 1899 | Mountaineers | 1971 | 2014 | Sun Belt |
| Auburn University | Auburn, Alabama | 1856 | Tigers | 1921 | 1932 | Southeastern |
| College of Charleston | Charleston, South Carolina | 1770 | Cougars | 1998 | 2013 | Colonial Athletic |
| Clemson University | Clemson, South Carolina | 1889 | Tigers | 1921 | 1953 | Atlantic Coast |
| Davidson College | Davidson, North Carolina | 1837 | Wildcats | 1936; 1992 | 1988; 2014 | Atlantic 10 |
| Duke University | Durham, North Carolina | 1838 | Blue Devils | 1928 | 1953 | Atlantic Coast |
| East Carolina University | Greenville, North Carolina | 1907 | Pirates | 1964 | 1976 | The American |
| Elon University | Elon, North Carolina | 1889 | Phoenix | 2003 | 2014 | Colonial Athletic |
| University of Florida | Gainesville, Florida | 1853 | Gators | 1922 | 1932 | Southeastern |
| George Washington University | Washington, D.C. | 1821 | Colonials | 1941 | 1970 | Atlantic 10 |
| University of Georgia | Athens, Georgia | 1785 | Bulldogs | 1921 | 1932 | Southeastern |
| Georgia Southern University | Statesboro, Georgia | 1906 | Eagles | 1991 | 2014 | Sun Belt |
| Georgia Institute of Technology | Atlanta, Georgia | 1885 | Yellow Jackets | 1921 | 1932 | Atlantic Coast |
| University of Kentucky | Lexington, Kentucky | 1865 | Wildcats | 1921 | 1932 | Southeastern |
| Louisiana State University | Baton Rouge, Louisiana | 1860 | Tigers | 1922 | 1932 | Southeastern |
| Marshall University | Huntington, West Virginia | 1837 | Thundering Herd | 1976 | 1997 | Sun Belt |
| University of Maryland, College Park | College Park, Maryland | 1856 | Terrapins | 1923 | 1953 | Big Ten |
| University of Mississippi | Oxford, Mississippi | 1848 | Rebels | 1922 | 1932 | Southeastern |
| Mississippi State University | Starkville, Mississippi | 1878 | Bulldogs | 1921 | 1932 | Southeastern |
| University of North Carolina at Chapel Hill | Chapel Hill, North Carolina | 1789 | Tar Heels | 1921 | 1953 | Atlantic Coast |
| North Carolina State University | Raleigh, North Carolina | 1887 | Wolfpack | 1921 | 1953 | Atlantic Coast |
| University of Richmond | Richmond, Virginia | 1830 | Spiders | 1936 | 1976 | Atlantic 10 (A-10) |
| Sewanee: The University of the South | Sewanee, Tennessee | 1857 | Tigers | 1923 | 1932 | Southern Athletic (NCAA DIII) |
| University of South Carolina | Columbia, South Carolina | 1801 | Gamecocks | 1922 | 1953 | Southeastern |
| University of Tennessee | Knoxville, Tennessee | 1794 | Volunteers | 1921 | 1932 | Southeastern |
| Tulane University | New Orleans, Louisiana | 1834 | Green Wave | 1922 | 1932 | The American |
| Vanderbilt University | Nashville, Tennessee | 1873 | Commodores | 1922 | 1932 | Southeastern |
| University of Virginia | Charlottesville, Virginia | 1819 | Cavaliers | 1921 | 1937 | Atlantic Coast |
| Virginia Polytechnic Institute and State University | Blacksburg, Virginia | 1872 | Hokies | 1921 | 1965 | Atlantic Coast |
| Wake Forest University | Winston-Salem, North Carolina | 1834 | Demon Deacons | 1936 | 1953 | Atlantic Coast |
| Washington and Lee University | Lexington, Virginia | 1749 | Generals | 1921 | 1958 | Old Dominion (NCAA DIII) |
| West Virginia University | Morgantown, West Virginia | 1867 | Mountaineers | 1950 | 1968 | Big 12 |
| The College of William & Mary | Williamsburg, Virginia | 1693 | Tribe | 1936 | 1977 | Colonial Athletic |

== See also ==
- List of Southern Conference football champions
- List of Southern Conference men's basketball champions
- Southern Conference baseball tournament
