= Jackie Carson =

American basketball coach

Current position
- Title: Senior Associate Commissioner for Women's Basketball
- Conference: ACC

Biographical details
- Born: January 24, 1978 (age 48); Woodbridge, Virginia

Playing career
- 1996–2000: Furman

Coaching career (HC unless noted)
- 2004–2005: Bucknell (assistant)
- 2005–2010: James Madison (assistant)
- 2010–2023: Furman

Head coaching record
- Overall: 205–197 (.510)

Jackie Carson (born January 24, 1978) is an American basketball coach who was the head coach of the Furman Paladins women's team. She is now serving as the ACC's Senior Associate Commissioner for Women's Basketball.

== Head coaching record ==
Record table
Season	Team	Overall	Conference	Standing	Postseason
Furman Paladins (Southern Conference) (2010–2023)
2010–11	Furman	14–16	10–10	T–5th	
2011–12	Furman	15–16	10–10	6th	
2012–13	Furman	12–18	8–12	7th	
2013–14	Furman	18–13	12–6	2nd	WNIT 1st Round
2014–15	Furman	19–14	7–7	5th	WBI 1st Round
2015–16	Furman	15–16	7–7	5th	
2016–17	Furman	14–17	7–7	T–4th	
2017–18	Furman	18–14	7–7	4th	WBI Quarterfinals
2018–19	Furman	19–14	9–5	T–2nd	WNIT 1st Round
2019–20	Furman	19–12	8–6	T–4th	
2020–21	Furman	11–14	6–8	T–5th	
2021–22	Furman	20–14	10–4	3rd	WBI Seventh Place
2022–23	Furman	11–19	3–11	7th	
Furman:		205–197 (.510)	104–100 (.510)		
Total:		205–197 (.510)			
National champion Postseason invitational champion Conference regular season champion Conference regular season and conference tournament champion Division regular season champion Division regular season and conference tournament champion Conference tournament champion
