= UNC Greensboro Spartans women's basketball =

UNC Greensboro Spartans
2025–26 UNC Greensboro Spartans women's basketball team
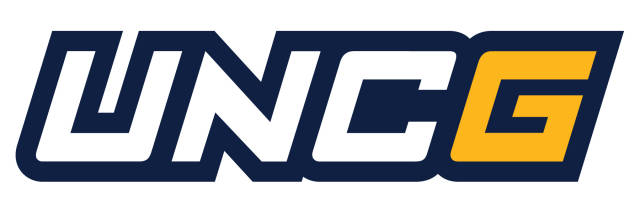
- University: University of North Carolina at Greensboro
- Head coach: Trina Patterson (10th season)
- Location: Greensboro, North Carolina
- Arena: Fleming Gymnasium (capacity: 2,320)
- Conference: Southern
- Nickname: Spartans
- Colors: Navy, white, and gold

NCAA Division I tournament runner-up
- Division III; 1982
Other NCAA Division I tournament results
Final Four	Division III; 1982, 1988
Elite Eight	Division III; 1982, 1988
Appearances	Division III; 1982, 1983, 1984, 1985, 1986, 1987, 1988 Division II; 1991 Division I 1998, 2025

Conference tournament champions
- DIAC; 1982, 1983, 1984, 1985, 1987, 1988 SoCon; 1998, 2025

Conference regular-season champions
- DIAC; 1986 Big South; 1993, 1994, 1995, 1996, 1997 SoCon; 2002, 2020, 2025

Uniforms
Home	Away

The UNC Greensboro Spartans women's basketball team represents the University of North Carolina at Greensboro in NCAA Division I. The school's team currently competes in the Southern Conference.

== History ==
They played in the NCAA Division III Tournament in 1982, 1983, 1984, 1985, 1986, 1987, and 1988. They made the Final Four in 1982 and 1988, losing to Elizabethtown College in the title game of the former and Concordia (Minnesota) in the Final Four in the latter.

They were champions of the Dixie Intercollegiate Athletic Conference (DIAC) in regular season and tournament in 1982, 1983, 1985, 1987, and 1988, with a tournament title also occurring in 1984 and a regular season title in 1986. They played in the Division II Tournament in 1991. They won the Big South Conference regular season title in five consecutive seasons from 1993 to 1997, but they failed to win the conference tournament, finishing as runner-up four times.

They won the Southern Conference conference tournament in 1998 after beating Georgia Southern 75–68. In their first ever NCAA Division I Tournament appearance, they lost 94–46 to Alabama in the First Round. They lost in the SoCon tournament championship game in 2000 (68–49 to Furman), 2001 (64–63 to Chattanooga), 2002 (77–69 to Chattanooga), and 2006 (91–79 to Chattanooga).

== Postseason ==
=== NCAA Division I tournament results ===
The Spartans have made two appearances in the NCAA Division I women's basketball tournament. They have a combined record of 0–1.

Year	Seed	Round	Opponent	Result
1998	#15	First Round	Alabama	L 46–94
2025	#16	First Round	USC	L 25–71

=== NCAA Division II tournament results ===
The Spartans made one appearance in the NCAA Division II women's basketball tournament. They had a combined record of 0–1.

Year	Round	Opponent	Result
1991	Regional Finals	Norfolk State	L 62–72

=== NCAA Division III tournament results ===
The Spartans made seven appearances in the NCAA Division III women's basketball tournament. They had a combined record of 9–6.

Year	Round	Opponent	Result
1982	First Round; Elite Eight; Final Four; Championship Game	St. Andrews; Susquehanna; Pomona-Pitzer; Elizabethtown	W 71–63; W 74–66; W 77–66; L 66–67 (OT)
1983	First Round	Knoxville	L 71–74
1984	First Round	Knoxville	L 74–82
1985	First Round; Regional Final	LeMoyne-Owen; Rust	W 84–77 (OT); L 66–70
1986	First Round; Regional Finals	Virginia Wesleyan; Rust	W 84–75; L 61–99
1987	First Round	Centre	L 69–79
1988	First Round; Sweet Sixeen; Elite Eight; Final Four; Regional Third Place	Centre; Rust; Luther; Concordia-Moorhead; Southern Maine	W 81–77; W 66–64; W 55–52; L 66–103; W 68–66
