= Samford Bulldogs women's basketball =

Women's college basketball team

Samford Bulldogs
2025–26 Samford Bulldogs women's basketball team
- University: Samford University
- First season: 1997–98
- Head coach: Matt Wise (1st season)
- Location: Homewood, Alabama
- Arena: Pete Hanna Center (capacity: 4,954)
- Conference: SoCon
- Nickname: Bulldogs
- Colors: Blue and red
- All-time record: 291–282 (.508)

NCAA Division I tournament appearances
- 2011, 2012, 2026

Conference tournament champions
- 2011, 2012, 2020, 2026

Conference regular-season champions
- 2020, 2021

Uniforms
Home	Away

The Samford Bulldogs women's basketball team, formerly the Samford Lady Bulldogs, is the intercollegiate women's basketball program representing Samford University in Homewood, Alabama, United States. Since 2008, the team competes in the Southern Conference (SoCon), after leaving the Ohio Valley Conference (OVC). They play their home games at the Pete Hanna Center.

== Coaches ==
The Samford Bulldogs have had four coaches in their history. Until the end of the 2018–19 season, the team was coached by Mike Morris, who took over in 2002 for Janet Cone after she became Samford's associate athletics director. In 2019, Carley Kuhns was hired from Valdosta State University to become the third head coach in history. After Kuhns announced her resignation in April 2025, the Bulldogs promoted associate head coach Matt Wise to be the fourth head coach of the program.

=== Janet Cone coaching history ===
Statistics overview
Season	Team	Overall	Conference	Standing	Postseason
Samford (TAAC) (1997–2001)
1997–98	Samford	3–23	2–14		
1998–99	Samford	8–19	7–9		
1999–2000	Samford	19–10	13–5		
2000–01	Samford	8–21	6–12		
Samford:		38–73	28–40		
Samford (A-Sun) (2001–2002)
2001–02	Samford	3–24	2–18		
Samford:		3–24	2–18		
Total:		41–97			

=== Mike Morris coaching history ===
Statistics overview
Season	Team	Overall	Conference	Standing	Postseason
Samford (A-Sun) (2002–2003)
2002–03	Samford	7–20	3–13		
Samford:		7–20	3–13		
Samford (OVC) (2003–2008)
2003–04	Samford	10–17	3–13		
2004–05	Samford	13–15	6–10		
2005–06	Samford	21–8	15–5	3rd	
2006–07	Samford	18–13	12–8	4th	
2007–08	Samford	23–9	15–5	2nd	
Samford:		85–62	51–41		
Samford (SoCon) (2008–2019)
2008–09	Samford	22–7	16–4	2nd	
2009–10	Samford	23–11	14–6	T-2nd	WNIT second round
2010–11	Samford	25–8	15–5	2nd	NCAA first round
2011–12	Samford	20–13	12–8	4th	NCAA first round
2012–13	Samford	15–16	11–9	T-5th	
2013–14	Samford	10–20	8–10	6th	
2014–15	Samford	15–15	8–6	4th	
2015–16	Samford	20–11	11–3	3rd	
2016–17	Samford	12–19	4–10	6th	
2017–18	Samford	15–16	6–8	T-5th	
2018–19	Samford	10–20	5–9	7th	
Samford:		187–156	110–78		
Total:		279–238			

=== Carley Kuhns coaching history ===
Statistics overview
Season	Team	Overall	Conference	Standing	Postseason
Samford (SoCon) (2019–2025)
2019–20	Samford	18–14	10–4	T–1st	NCAA cancelled
2020–21	Samford	14–11	11–2	1st	WNIT first round
2021–22	Samford	13–17	7–7	4th	
2022–23	Samford	13–17	7–7	6th	
2023–24	Samford	14–16	6–8	6th	
2024–25	Samford	12–19	7–7	5th	
Samford:		84–94	48–35		
Total:		404–429			
National champion Postseason invitational champion Conference regular season champion Conference regular season and conference tournament champion Division regular season champion Division regular season and conference tournament champion Conference tournament champion

== NCAA tournament results ==
The Bulldogs have appeared in three NCAA Tournaments, with a combined record of 0–3.

Year	Seed	Round	Opponent	Result
2011	#14	First Round	#3 Florida State	L 46–76
2012	#15	First Round	#2 Duke	L 47–82
2026	#16	First Four	#16 Southern	L 53–65
