= 2024–25 Mercer Bears women's basketball team =

American college basketball season

2024–25 Mercer Bears women's basketball
- Conference: Southern Conference
- Record: 8–22 (3–11 SoCon)
- Head coach: Michelle Clark-Heard (1st season)
- Assistant coaches: Michael Morgan; Blessing Freeman; Elizabeth Metress; Darrius "Zeke" Mazyck
- Home arena: Hawkins Arena

2024–25 Southern Conference women's basketball standings
| | Conf. | | | | Overall |
| Team | W | | L | PCT | W | | L | PCT |
|---|---|---|---|---|---|---|---|---|
| UNC Greensboro † | 13 | – | 1 | .929 | 25 | – | 7 | .781 |
| Chattanooga | 9 | – | 5 | .643 | 17 | – | 15 | .531 |
| East Tennessee State | 8 | – | 6 | .571 | 17 | – | 13 | .567 |
| Wofford | 8 | – | 6 | .571 | 17 | – | 12 | .586 |
| Samford | 7 | – | 7 | .500 | 12 | – | 19 | .387 |
| Furman | 5 | – | 9 | .357 | 16 | – | 16 | .500 |
| Mercer | 3 | – | 11 | .214 | 8 | – | 22 | .267 |
| Western Carolina | 3 | – | 11 | .214 | 13 | – | 17 | .433 |
† 2025 SoCon tournament winner

The 2024–25 Mercer Bears women's basketball team represented Mercer University during the 2024–25 NCAA Division I women's basketball season. The Bears, who were led by first-year head coach Michelle Clark-Heard, played their home games at Hawkins Arena in Macon, Georgia as members of the Southern Conference (SoCon).

== Previous season ==
The Bears finished the 2023–24 season 15–17, 8–6 in SoCon play, to finish in a three-way tie for second place. They defeated East Tennessee State, before falling to top-seeded and eventual tournament champions Chattanooga in the semifinals of the SoCon tournament.

On March 9, 2024, head coach Susie Gardner announced her resignation, ending her 14-year tenure with the team. On March 23, the school announced that they would be hiring Mississippi State assistant and former Cincinnati head coach Michelle Clark-Heard as Gardner's successor.

== Preseason ==
On October 16, 2024, the SoCon released their preseason coaches poll. Mercer was picked to finish seventh in the SoCon regular season.

=== Preseason rankings ===
SoCon preseason poll
| Predicted finish | Team | Votes (1st place) |
|---|---|---|
| 1 | Wofford | 49 (7) |
| 2 | UNC Greensboro | 42 (1) |
| T-3 | Furman | 31 |
| T-3 | Samford | 31 |
| 5 | East Tennessee State | 25 |
| 6 | Chattanooga | 23 |
| 7 | Mercer | 13 |
| 8 | Western Carolina | 10 |

=== Preseason All-SoCon Team ===
No Bears were named to the Preseason All-SoCon team.

== Roster ==
2024–25 Mercer Bears women's basketball team
Players
Coaches

| Pos. | # | Name | Height | Year | Previous school | Hometown |
|---|---|---|---|---|---|---|
| F | 2 | Ariana Bennett | 6 ft 1 in (1.85 m) | Jr | Southwestern Illinois College | Edwardsville, Illinois |
| G | 5 | Jania Akins | 5 ft 8 in (1.73 m) | Fr | Norcross High School | Chicago, Illinois |
| G | 7 | Aliyah Collins | 5 ft 5 in (1.65 m) | Jr | Incarnate Word | College Station, Texas |
| G | 8 | Ioanna Stefanaki | 5 ft 10 in (1.78 m) | RS Fr | Idaho State | Crete, Greece |
| G | 9 | Nahawa Diarra | 5 ft 9 in (1.75 m) | Sr | New Mexico | Barcelona, Spain |
| G | 11 | Stephanie Utomi | 5 ft 11 in (1.8 m) | Fr | Arbor Preparatory High School | Detroit, Michigan |
| G | 12 | Kayla Smith | 5 ft 11 in (1.8 m) | Jr | Prairie View A&M | Lakeland, Florida |
| F | 16 | Astrid Mukulumpe | 6 ft 4 in (1.93 m) | Fr | Lycée Marguerite de Flandre | Orléans, France |
| F | 21 | Chelsy Bautista | 6 ft 1 in (1.85 m) | Jr | Odessa College | Santo Domingo, Dominican Republic |
| F | 23 | Ashlee Locke | 6 ft 3 in (1.91 m) | Sr | Flowery Branch High School | Flowery Branch, Georgia |
| G | 24 | Stacy Utomi | 5 ft 10 in (1.78 m) | Fr | Arbor Preparatory High School | Detroit, Michigan |
| G | 25 | Talia Harris | 5 ft 7 in (1.7 m) | Fr | Fishers High School | Fishers, Indiana |
| F | 41 | Zenia Palaska | 6 ft 2 in (1.88 m) | So | Vermont | Athens, Greece |

Head coach

- Michelle Clark-Heard (Western Kentucky)

Assistant coach(es)

- Michael Morgan (Trinity)
- Blessing Freeman (Mississippi State)
- Elizabeth Metress (Georgia)
- Darrius "Zeke" Mazyck (Clemson)

Legend

- (C) Team captain
- (S) Suspended
- (I) Ineligible
- (W) Walk-on
- Injured
- Current redshirt

Roster
Last update: May 23, 2025

== Schedule and results ==
| Date time, TV | Rank^{#} | Opponent^{#} | Result | Record | Site (attendance) city, state |
Exhibition
| October 30, 2024*; 7:00 pm | | Young Harris | W 61–28 | – | Hawkins Arena; Macon, GA |
Non-conference regular season
| November 4, 2024*; 7:00 pm, ESPN+ | | UNC Asheville | W 75–52 | 1–0 | Hawkins Arena (727); Macon, GA |
| November 9, 2024*; 2:00 pm, ESPN+ | | at Florida Atlantic | L 48–58 | 1–1 | Eleanor R. Baldwin Arena (774); Boca Raton, FL |
| November 12, 2024*; 7:00 pm, ESPN+ | | Western Kentucky | L 54–78 | 1–2 | Hawkins Arena (358); Macon, GA |
| November 17, 2024*; 2:00 pm, ESPN+ | | North Carolina A&T | W 46–38 | 2–2 | Hawkins Arena (419); Macon, GA |
| November 20, 2024*; 7:30 pm, SECN+ | | at Mississippi State | L 44–81 | 2–3 | Humphrey Coliseum (4,003); Starkville, MS |
| November 22, 2024*; 7:00 pm, ESPN+ | | Charleston Southern | W 59–48 | 3–3 | Hawkins Arena (498); Macon, GA |
| November 24, 2024*; 3:00 pm, ESPN+ | | at Austin Peay | L 53–66 | 3–4 | F&M Bank Arena; Clarksville, TN |
| November 27, 2024*; 6:30 pm, ESPN+ | | at Jacksonville | L 49–74 | 3–5 | Swisher Gymnasium (350); Jacksonville, FL |
| November 30, 2024*; 2:00 pm | | at Bethune–Cookman | W 70–64 | 4–5 | Moore Gymnasium (222); Daytona Beach, FL |
| December 5, 2024*; 11:00 am, ESPN+ | | Charlotte | L 42–43 | 4–6 | Hawkins Arena (931); Macon, GA |
| December 8, 2024*; 2:00 pm, ESPN+ | | Georgia Tech | L 42–78 | 4–7 | Hawkins Arena (519); Macon, GA |
| December 15, 2024*; 3:00 pm, ESPN+ | | at Tulane | L 46–73 | 4–8 | Devlin Fieldhouse (716); New Orleans, LA |
| December 19, 2024*; 7:00 pm, ESPN+ | | Jackson State | L 54–66 | 4–9 | Hawkins Arena (419); Macon, GA |
| December 21, 2024*; 2:00 pm, ESPN+ | | Appalachian State | L 61–74 | 4–10 | Hawkins Arena (319); Macon, GA |
| December 30, 2024*; 7:00 pm, ESPN+ | | at Kennesaw State | W 62–59 | 5–10 | KSU Convocation Center (710); Kennesaw, GA |
SoCon regular season
| January 11, 2025; 2:00 pm, ESPN+ | | Samford | W 56–53 | 6–10 (1–0) | Hawkins Arena (619); Macon, GA |
| January 16, 2025; 7:00 pm, ESPN+ | | at East Tennessee State | L 46–70 | 6–11 (1–1) | Brooks Gymnasium (283); Johnson City, TN |
| January 18, 2025; 2:00 pm, ESPN+ | | at Chattanooga | L 37–60 | 6–12 (1–2) | McKenzie Arena (1,511); Chattanooga, TN |
| January 23, 2025; 7:00 pm, ESPN+ | | Wofford | L 51–61 | 6–13 (1–3) | Hawkins Arena (1,583); Macon, GA |
| January 25, 2025; 2:00 pm, ESPN+ | | Furman | L 47–57 | 6–14 (1–4) | Hawkins Arena (1,619); Macon, GA |
| January 30, 2025; 7:00 pm, ESPN+ | | at UNC Greensboro | L 37–70 | 6–15 (1–5) | Fleming Gymnasium (368); Greensboro, NC |
| February 1, 2025; 1:00 pm, ESPN+ | | at Western Carolina | W 71–66 | 7–15 (2–5) | Ramsey Center (764); Cullowhee, NC |
| February 8, 2025; 3:00 pm, ESPN+ | | at Samford | L 49–65 | 7–16 (2–6) | Pete Hanna Center (378); Homewood, AL |
| February 13, 2025; 7:00 pm, ESPN+ | | Chattanooga | L 39–69 | 7–17 (2–7) | Hawkins Arena (1,754); Macon, GA |
| February 15, 2025; 2:00 pm, ESPN+ | | East Tennessee State | L 67–70 | 7–18 (2–8) | Hawkins Arena (1,549); Macon, GA |
| February 20, 2025; 7:00 pm, ESPN+ | | at Furman | L 70–72 | 7–19 (2–9) | Hayes Gym (411); Tigerville, SC |
| February 22, 2025; 6:00 pm, ESPN+ | | at Wofford | L 64–65 | 7–20 (2–10) | Jerry Richardson Indoor Stadium (713); Spartanburg, SC |
| February 27, 2025; 7:00 pm, ESPN+ | | Western Carolina | W 51–49 | 8–20 (3–10) | Hawkins Arena (1,366); Macon, GA |
| March 1, 2025; 2:00 pm, ESPN+ | | UNC Greensboro | L 37–76 | 8–21 (3–11) | Hawkins Arena (1,733); Macon, GA |
SoCon tournament
| March 6, 2025; 1:30 pm, ESPN+ | (7) | vs. (2) Chattanooga; Quarterfinals | L 47–68 | 8–22 | Harrah's Cherokee Center; Asheville, NC |
*Non-conference game. ^{#}Rankings from AP Poll. (#) Tournament seedings in parentheses. All times are in Eastern.
