= 2024–25 Western Carolina Catamounts women's basketball team =

American college basketball season

2024–25 Western Carolina Catamounts women's basketball
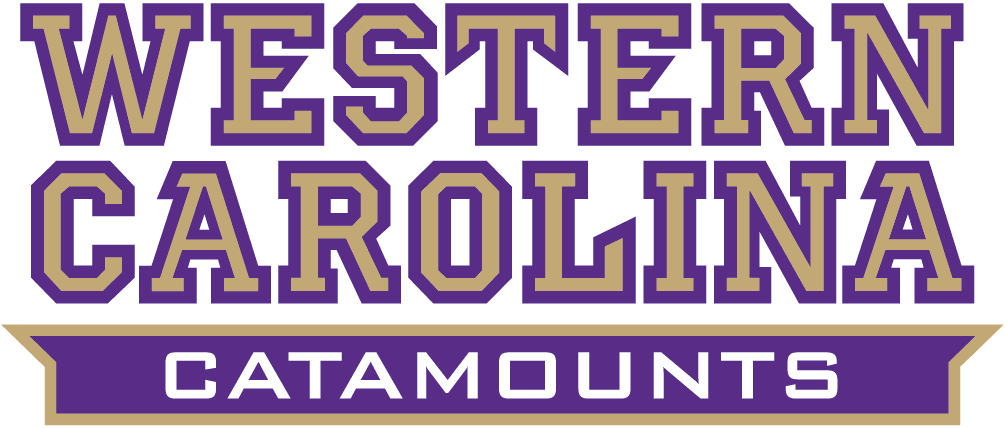
- Conference: Southern Conference
- Record: 13–17 (3–11 SoCon)
- Head coach: Jonathan Tsipis (1st season)
- Associate head coach: Alison Seberger
- Assistant coaches: Darius Barksdale; Sydney Lowery; Danielle Rauch
- Home arena: Ramsey Center

2024–25 Southern Conference women's basketball standings
	Conf.				Overall
Team	W		L	PCT	W		L	PCT
UNC Greensboro †	13	–	1	.929	25	–	7	.781
Chattanooga	9	–	5	.643	17	–	15	.531
East Tennessee State	8	–	6	.571	17	–	13	.567
Wofford	8	–	6	.571	17	–	12	.586
Samford	7	–	7	.500	12	–	19	.387
Furman	5	–	9	.357	16	–	16	.500
Mercer	3	–	11	.214	8	–	22	.267
Western Carolina	3	–	11	.214	13	–	17	.433
† 2025 SoCon tournament winner

The 2024–25 Western Carolina Catamounts women's basketball team represented Western Carolina University during the 2024–25 NCAA Division I women's basketball season. The Catamounts, who were led by first-year head coach Jonathan Tsipis, played their home games at the Ramsey Center in Cullowhee, North Carolina as members of the Southern Conference (SoCon).

The Catamounts finished the season with a 13–17 record, 3–11 in SoCon play, to finish in eighth (last) place.

== Previous season ==
The Catamounts finished the 2023–24 season 6–24, 1–13 in SoCon play, to finish in eighth (last) place. They were defeated by top-seeded and eventual tournament champions Chattanooga in the quarterfinals of the SoCon tournament.

On March 9, 2024, the school announced that they would not be renewing head coach Kiley Hill's contract, ending his five-year tenure with the team. On April 5, the school announced that they would be hiring former Wisconsin head coach Jonathan Tsipis as the team's new head coach.

== Preseason ==
On October 16, 2024, the SoCon released their preseason coaches poll. Western Carolina was picked to finish last in the SoCon regular season.

=== Preseason rankings ===
SoCon preseason poll
Predicted finish	Team	Votes (1st place)
1	Wofford	49 (7)
2	UNC Greensboro	42 (1)
T–3	Furman	31
T–3	Samford	31
5	East Tennessee State	25
6	Chattanooga	23
7	Mercer	13
8	Western Carolina	10

=== Preseason All-SoCon Team ===
No Catamounts were named to the Preseason All-SoCon team.

== Roster ==
2024–25 Western Carolina Catamounts women's basketball team
Players
Coaches

Pos.	#	Name	Height	Year	Previous school	Hometown
G	0	Chelsea Wooten	5 ft 9 in (1.75 m)	Sr	McLennan Community College	McKinney, TX
G	2	Kehinde Obasuyi	5 ft 5 in (1.65 m)	RS So	Carrollton High School	Villa Rica, GA
G	3	Reagan Trumm	5 ft 9 in (1.75 m)	Jr	Powell High School	Powell, TN
G	4	Taj Hunter	5 ft 8 in (1.73 m)	Fr	Grayson High School	Atlanta, GA
G/F	5	Tyja Beans	5 ft 11 in (1.8 m)	So	Spruce Creek High School	Daytona Beach, FL
G	10	Jada Burton	5 ft 8 in (1.73 m)	Sr	Dodge City Community College	Spartanburg, SC
F	13	Zanoria Cruz	5 ft 10 in (1.78 m)	Sr	Lake Highland Preparatory School	Orlando, FL
G	15	AC Carter	5 ft 10 in (1.78 m)	GS	Georgia Tech	Atlanta, GA
G	22	Nicole Azar	5 ft 11 in (1.8 m)	RS So	Samford	Atlanta, GA
G/F	23	Erin Stack	6 ft 2 in (1.88 m)	Jr	St. Charles North High School	St. Charles, IL
F/C	25	Kennedy Hilsenroth	6 ft 1 in (1.85 m)	Fr	Northwest Cabarrus High School	Concord, NC
C	33	Grace Pack	6 ft 2 in (1.88 m)	Jr	Gardner–Webb	Richmond, VA

Head coach

- Jonathan Tsipis (North Carolina)

Assistant coach(es)

- Alison Seberger (Illinois State)
- Darius Barksdale (Urbana)
- Sydney Lowery (Boston College)
- Danielle Rauch (Michigan)

Legend

- (C) Team captain
- (S) Suspended
- (I) Ineligible
- (W) Walk-on
- Injured
- Current redshirt

Roster
Last update: May 24, 2025

== Schedule and results ==
Date time, TV	Rank^{#}	Opponent^{#}	Result	Record	Site (attendance) city, state
Non-conference regular season
November 4, 2024*; 5:00 p.m., ESPN+		Warren Wilson	W 119–36	1–0	Ramsey Center (379); Cullowhee, NC
November 7, 2024*; 6:00 p.m., ESPN+		Campbell	W 73–72	2–0	Ramsey Center (589); Cullowhee, NC
November 10, 2024*; 2:00 p.m., ESPN+		at Radford	W 55–53	3–0	Dedmon Center (902); Radford, VA
November 13, 2024*; 11:30 a.m., SECN+		at No. 9 Oklahoma	L 56–122	3–1	Lloyd Noble Center (7,757); Norman, OK
November 16, 2024*; 2:00 p.m., ESPN+		at USC Upstate	W 80–52	4–1	G. B. Hodge Center (237); Spartanburg, SC
November 19, 2024*; 6:30 p.m., ESPN+		at Georgia State	L 64–68	4–2	GSU Convocation Center (287); Atlanta, GA
November 22, 2024*; 6:30 p.m., ESPN+		at Presbyterian	W 71–41	5–2	Templeton Center (329); Clinton, SC
November 26, 2024*; 7:00 p.m., SECN+		at Tennessee	L 50–102	5–3	Thompson–Boling Arena (9,086); Knoxville, TN
December 6, 2024*; 11:00 a.m., ESPN+		Gardner–Webb	L 65–73	5–4	Ramsey Center (1,740); Cullowhee, NC
December 8, 2024*; 2:00 p.m., ESPN+		West Georgia	W 81–76 ^{OT}	6–4	Ramsey Center (531); Cullowhee, NC
December 14, 2024*; 2:00 p.m., ESPN+		at Queens	W 82–66	7–4	Curry Arena (212); Charlotte, NC
December 19, 2024*; 7:00 p.m., ESPN+		at Murray State	L 79–110	7–5	CFSB Center (1,037); Murray, KY
December 21, 2024*; 4:00 p.m., The CW62/ESPN+		at UNC Asheville	W 77–64	8–5	Kimmel Arena (253); Asheville, NC
December 30, 2024*; 2:00 p.m., ESPN+		Southern Wesleyan	W 112–53	9–5	Ramsey Center (388); Cullowhee, NC
January 2, 2025*; 2:00 p.m., ESPN+		Montreat	W 94–54	10–5	Ramsey Center (424); Cullowhee, NC
SoCon regular season
January 9, 2025; 6:00 p.m., NexStar/ESPN+		Chattanooga	L 56–67	10–6 (0–1)	Ramsey Center (437); Cullowhee, NC
January 12, 2025; 1:00 p.m., ESPN+		East Tennessee State	W 64–60	11–6 (1–1)	Ramsey Center (613); Cullowhee, NC
January 16, 2025; 7:00 p.m., ESPN+		at Furman	L 73–82	11–7 (1–2)	Hayes Gym (319); Tigerville, SC
January 18, 2025; 2:00 p.m., ESPN+		at Wofford	L 53–66	11–8 (1–3)	Jerry Richardson Indoor Stadium (569); Spartanburg, SC
January 25, 2025; 2:00 p.m., ESPN+		UNC Greensboro	L 58–66	11–9 (1–4)	Ramsey Center (421); Cullowhee, NC
January 30, 2025; 6:00 p.m., ESPN+		Samford	L 86–90 ^{2OT}	11–10 (1–5)	Ramsey Center (648); Cullowhee, NC
February 1, 2025; 1:00 p.m., ESPN+		Mercer	L 66–71	11–11 (1–6)	Ramsey Center (764); Cullowhee, NC
February 6, 2025; 7:00 p.m., ESPN+		at East Tennessee State	L 64–77	11–12 (1–7)	Brooks Gymnasium (381); Johnson City, TN
February 8, 2025; 2:00 p.m., ESPN+		at Chattanooga	L 59–74	11–13 (1–8)	McKenzie Arena (1,723); Chattanooga, TN
February 13, 2025; 6:00 p.m., ESPN+		Wofford	L 68–70	11–14 (1–9)	Ramsey Center (623); Cullowhee, NC
February 15, 2025; 1:00 p.m., ESPN+		Furman	W 70–57	12–14 (2–9)	Ramsey Center (1,294); Cullowhee, NC
February 22, 2025; 2:00 p.m., ESPN+		at UNC Greensboro	L 53–57	12–15 (2–10)	Fleming Gymnasium (651); Greensboro, NC
February 27, 2025; 7:00 p.m., ESPN+		at Mercer	L 49–51	12–16 (2–11)	Hawkins Arena (1,366); Macon, GA
March 1, 2025; 3:00 p.m., ESPN+		at Samford	W 76–69	13–16 (3–11)	Pete Hanna Center (331); Homewood, AL
SoCon tournament
March 6, 2025; 11:00 a.m., ESPN+	(8)	vs. (1) UNC Greensboro; Quarterfinals	L 43–50	13–17	Harrah's Cherokee Center; Asheville, NC
*Non-conference game. ^{#}Rankings from AP poll. (#) Tournament seedings in parentheses. All times are in Eastern.
