= 2024–25 Samford Bulldogs women's basketball team =

American college basketball season

2024–25 Samford Bulldogs women's basketball
- Conference: Southern Conference
- Record: 12–19 (7–7 SoCon)
- Head coach: Carley Kuhns (6th season)
- Assistant coaches: Sally Higgins; Matt Wise; Charity Brown
- Home arena: Pete Hanna Center

2024–25 Southern Conference women's basketball standings
	Conf.				Overall
Team	W		L	PCT	W		L	PCT
UNC Greensboro †	13	–	1	.929	25	–	7	.781
Chattanooga	9	–	5	.643	17	–	15	.531
East Tennessee State	8	–	6	.571	17	–	13	.567
Wofford	8	–	6	.571	17	–	12	.586
Samford	7	–	7	.500	12	–	19	.387
Furman	5	–	9	.357	16	–	16	.500
Mercer	3	–	11	.214	8	–	22	.267
Western Carolina	3	–	11	.214	13	–	17	.433
† 2025 SoCon tournament winner

The 2024–25 Samford Bulldogs women's basketball team represented Samford University during the 2024–25 NCAA Division I women's basketball season. The Bulldogs, who were led by sixth-year head coach Carley Kuhns, played their home games at the Pete Hanna Center in Homewood, Alabama as members of the Southern Conference (SoCon).

== Previous season ==
The Bulldogs finished the 2023–24 season 14–16, 6–8 in SoCon play, to finish in sixth place. They were defeated by Wofford in the quarterfinals of the SoCon tournament.

== Preseason ==
On October 16, 2024, the SoCon released their preseason coaches poll. Samford was picked to finish tied for third in the SoCon regular season.

=== Preseason rankings ===
SoCon preseason poll
Predicted finish	Team	Votes (1st place)
1	Wofford	49 (7)
2	UNC Greensboro	42 (1)
T-3	Furman	31
T-3	Samford	31
5	East Tennessee State	25
6	Chattanooga	23
7	Mercer	13
8	Western Carolina	10

=== Preseason All-SoCon Team ===
Preseason All-SoCon Team
Player	Position	Year
Kennedy Langham	Guard	Sophomore

== Roster ==
2024–25 Samford Bulldogs women's basketball team
Players
Coaches

Pos.	#	Name	Height	Year	Previous school	Hometown
G	1	Claire Johnson	5 ft 9 in (1.75 m)	Fr	McCracken County High School	Paducah, Kentucky
G	2	Jada Knight	5 ft 7 in (1.7 m)	Sr	Butler Community College	Hoover, Alabama
G	4	Kennedy Langham	5 ft 7 in (1.7 m)	So	Sparkman High School	Harvest, Alabama
G	5	Sadie Stetson	5 ft 7 in (1.7 m)	GS	American	Waterford, Vermont
G/F	10	Aubrey Blankenship	6 ft 0 in (1.83 m)	RS Fr	Green Hill High School	Mount Juliet, Tennessee
G	11	Alonya Waldon	5 ft 5 in (1.65 m)	So	Palm Bay High School	Melbourne, Florida
F	14	Annie Ramil	6 ft 0 in (1.83 m)	GS	Binghamton	Binghamton, New York
G	20	Alyssa Tarpley	5 ft 10 in (1.78 m)	Jr	Gunter High School	Gunter, Texas
G/F	21	Kylee Lewandowski	6 ft 1 in (1.85 m)	GS	Richmond	Pittsburgh, Pennsylvania
G	22	Sierra Godbolt	5 ft 6 in (1.68 m)	Jr	UCF	Orlando, Florida
F	23	Kamryn Knight	6 ft 1 in (1.85 m)	GS	LeMoyne–Owen College	Madison, Alabama
F	32	Yael Maayan	6 ft 1 in (1.85 m)	Fr	Hof HaSharon	Yehuda, Israel
F	33	Martha Bishop	6 ft 1 in (1.85 m)	So	Spartanburg High School	Spartanburg, South Carolina
C	44	Emily Bowman	6 ft 5 in (1.96 m)	RS Jr	Vanderbilt	Huntsville, Alabama

Head coach

- Carley Kuhns (Valdosta State)

Assistant coach(es)

- Sally Higgins (West Texas A&M)
- Matt Wise (Transylvania)
- Charity Brown (Samford)

Legend

- (C) Team captain
- (S) Suspended
- (I) Ineligible
- (W) Walk-on
- Injured
- Current redshirt

Roster
Last update: May 21, 2025

== Schedule and results ==
Date time, TV	Rank^{#}	Opponent^{#}	Result	Record	Site (attendance) city, state
Non-conference regular season
November 4, 2024*; 5:30 pm, SECN+		at Tennessee	L 53–101	0–1	Thompson–Boling Arena (9,515); Knoxville, TN
November 8, 2024*; 11:00 am, ESPN+		at Central Arkansas	L 44–63	0–2	Farris Center (1,036); Conway, AR
November 10, 2024*; 2:00 pm, ESPN+		at Memphis	L 75–88	0–3	Elma Roane Fieldhouse (802); Memphis, TN
November 14, 2024*; 5:00 pm, ACCNX		at Florida State	L 68–101	0–4	Donald L. Tucker Center (1,316); Tallahassee, FL
November 17, 2024*; 5:00 pm, ESPN+		Fisk	W 112–61	1–4	Pete Hanna Center (303); Homewood, AL
November 19, 2024*; 11:00 am		Montevallo	W 87–71	2–4	Pete Hanna Center (873); Homewood, AL
November 22, 2024*; 6:30 pm, SECN+		at Vanderbilt	L 59–104	2–5	Memorial Gymnasium (2,524); Nashville, TN
November 26, 2024*; 12:00 pm, ESPN+		Tennessee Tech	L 65–79	2–6	Pete Hanna Center (311); Homewood, AL
November 29, 2024*; 2:30 pm		vs. Stephen F. Austin; North Florida MTE	L 66–90	2–7	UNF Arena (110); Jacksonville, FL
November 30, 2024*; 12:00 pm, ESPN+		at North Florida; North Florida MTE	L 71–79	2–8	UNF Arena (358); Jacksonville, FL
December 5, 2024*; 6:00 pm, ESPN+		at North Alabama	W 67–61 ^{OT}	3–8	CB&S Bank Arena (1,621); Florence, AL
December 8, 2024*; 5:00 pm, ESPN+		Miles	W 82–41	4–8	Pete Hanna Center (303); Homewood, AL
December 17, 2024*; 6:30 pm, ESPN+		at No. 12 TCU	L 64–103	4–9	Schollmaier Arena (1,940); Fort Worth, TX
December 20, 2024*; 6:00 pm, ESPN+		Florida A&M	L 67–72 ^{OT}	4–10	Pete Hanna Center (173); Homewood, AL
December 29, 2024*; 2:00 pm, ESPN+		Eastern Kentucky	L 66–81	4–11	Pete Hanna Center (237); Homewood, AL
January 4, 2025*; 2:00 pm		Berry	W 94–35	5–11	Pete Hanna Center (191); Homewood, AL
SoCon regular season
January 11, 2025; 1:00 pm, ESPN+		at Mercer	L 53–56	5–12 (0–1)	Hawkins Arena (619); Macon, GA
January 16, 2025; 5:00 pm, ESPN+		at Chattanooga	L 63–69	5–13 (0–2)	McKenzie Arena (1,746); Chattanooga, TN
January 18, 2025; 1:00 pm, ESPN+		at East Tennessee State	L 48–69	5–14 (0–3)	Brooks Gymnasium (341); Johnson City, TN
January 23, 2025; 6:00 pm, ESPN+		Furman	W 77–62	6–14 (1–3)	Pete Hanna Center (231); Homewood, AL
January 25, 2025; 2:00 pm, ESPN+		Wofford	L 49–84	6–15 (1–4)	Pete Hanna Center (317); Homewood, AL
January 30, 2025; 5:00 pm, ESPN+		at Western Carolina	W 90–86 ^{2OT}	7–15 (2–4)	Ramsey Center (648); Cullowhee, NC
February 1, 2025; 1:00 pm, ESPN+		at UNC Greensboro	L 66–78	7–16 (2–5)	Fleming Gymnasium (414); Greensboro, NC
February 8, 2025; 2:00 pm, ESPN+		Mercer	W 65–49	8–16 (3–5)	Pete Hanna Center (378); Homewood, AL
February 13, 2025; 6:00 pm, ESPN+		East Tennessee State	W 50–43	9–16 (4–5)	Pete Hanna Center (213); Homewood, AL
February 15, 2025; 2:00 pm, ESPN+		Chattanooga	W 55–50	10–16 (5–5)	Pete Hanna Center (417); Homewood, AL
February 20, 2025; 5:00 pm, ESPN+		at Wofford	W 62–54	11–16 (6–5)	Jerry Richardson Indoor Stadium (534); Spartanburg, SC
February 22, 2025; 6:00 pm, ESPN+		at Furman	W 73–62	12–16 (7–5)	Hayes Gym (362); Tigerville, SC
February 27, 2025; 6:00 pm, ESPN+		UNC Greensboro	L 59–71	12–17 (7–6)	Pete Hanna Center (197); Homewood, AL
March 1, 2025; 2:00 pm, ESPN+		Western Carolina	L 69–76	12–18 (7–7)	Pete Hanna Center (331); Homewood, AL
SoCon tournament
March 6, 2025; 4:45 pm, ESPN+	(5)	vs. (4) Wofford; Quarterfinals	L 56–58	12–19	Harrah's Cherokee Center (2,581); Asheville, NC
*Non-conference game. ^{#}Rankings from AP Poll. (#) Tournament seedings in parentheses. All times are in Central.
