= 2024–25 East Tennessee State Buccaneers women's basketball team =

American college basketball season

2024–25 East Tennessee State Buccaneers women's basketball
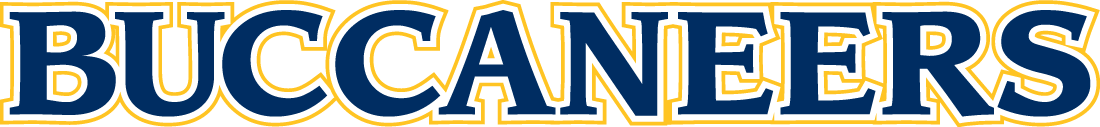
- Conference: Southern Conference
- Record: 17–13 (8–6 SoCon)
- Head coach: Brenda Mock Brown (3rd season)
- Assistant coaches: Honey Brown; Eric Gracia; Symone Denham
- Home arena: Brooks Gymnasium

2024–25 Southern Conference women's basketball standings
	Conf.				Overall
Team	W		L	PCT	W		L	PCT
UNC Greensboro †	13	–	1	.929	25	–	7	.781
Chattanooga	9	–	5	.643	17	–	15	.531
East Tennessee State	8	–	6	.571	17	–	13	.567
Wofford	8	–	6	.571	17	–	12	.586
Samford	7	–	7	.500	12	–	19	.387
Furman	5	–	9	.357	16	–	16	.500
Mercer	3	–	11	.214	8	–	22	.267
Western Carolina	3	–	11	.214	13	–	17	.433
† 2025 SoCon tournament winner

The 2024–25 East Tennessee State Buccaneers women's basketball team represented East Tennessee State University during the 2024–25 NCAA Division I women's basketball season. The Buccaneers, who were led by third-year head coach Brenda Mock Brown, played their home games at Brooks Gymnasium in Johnson City, Tennessee as members of the Southern Conference (SoCon).

== Previous season ==
The Buccaneers finished the 2023–24 season 18–12, 7–7 in SoCon play, to finish in fifth place. They were defeated by Mercer in the quarterfinals of the SoCon tournament.

== Preseason ==
On October 16, 2024, the SoCon released their preseason coaches poll. East Tennessee State was picked to finish fifth in the SoCon regular season.

=== Preseason rankings ===
SoCon preseason poll
Predicted finish	Team	Votes (1st place)
1	Wofford	49 (7)
2	UNC Greensboro	42 (1)
T-3	Furman	31
T-3	Samford	31
5	East Tennessee State	25
6	Chattanooga	23
7	Mercer	13
8	Western Carolina	10

=== Preseason All-SoCon Team ===
Preseason All-SoCon Team
Player	Position	Year
Kendall Folley	Guard	Senior

== Roster ==
2024–25 East Tennessee State Buccaneers women's basketball team
Players
Coaches

Pos.	#	Name	Height	Year	Previous school	Hometown
G	0	Paige Lyons	5 ft 6 in (1.68 m)	RS Jr	Wagner	Atlanta, Georgia
G	1	Lucy Hood	5 ft 9 in (1.75 m)	Fr	Rabun County High School	Rabun Gap, Georgia
G	2	Kaylee Carson	5 ft 8 in (1.73 m)	Fr	Independence High School	Charlotte, North Carolina
G	3	Brecken Snotherly	5 ft 9 in (1.75 m)	So	Eastern Randolph High School	Franklinville, North Carolina
G	4	Braylyn Milton	5 ft 11 in (1.8 m)	Sr	Cincinnati	Charlotte, North Carolina
G	5	Gemma Grüttner Bacoul	5 ft 10 in (1.78 m)	Jr	McCook Community College	Berlin, Germany
G	10	Courtney Moore (5Y)	5 ft 7 in (1.7 m)	Sr	P. K. Yonge Developmental Research School	Gainesville, Florida
G	11	Carmen Richardson	5 ft 7 in (1.7 m)	Fr	Colonial High School	Orlando, Florida
G	12	Kendall Folley	5 ft 7 in (1.7 m)	Sr	Oakland	Lebanon, Ohio
G	15	Jaidyn Harper	5 ft 10 in (1.78 m)	Fr	St. John's College High School	Herndon, Virginia
F	20	Meghan Downing	6 ft 2 in (1.88 m)	Jr	Tri-Village High School	New Madison, Ohio
F	21	Kennedy Younkin	6 ft 2 in (1.88 m)	Fr	Teays Valley High School	Ashville, Ohio
F	25	Isabella Hunt (5Y)	5 ft 11 in (1.8 m)	Sr	Mount St. Mary's	Johnstown, Pennsylvania

Head coach

- Brenda Mock Brown (Wake Forest)

Assistant coach(es)

- Honey Brown (Maryville)
- Eric Gracia (Texas–Pan American)
- Symone Denham (Wright State)

Legend

- (C) Team captain
- (S) Suspended
- (I) Ineligible
- (W) Walk-on
- (5Y) Fifth-year senior
- Injured
- Current redshirt

Roster
Last update: May 17, 2025

== Schedule and results ==
Date time, TV	Rank^{#}	Opponent^{#}	Result	Record	Site (attendance) city, state
Non-conference regular season
November 5, 2024*; 7:00 pm, ACCNX		at No. 9 NC State	L 55–80	0–1	Reynolds Coliseum (4,291); Raleigh, NC
November 9, 2024*; 6:00 pm, ESPN+		Jackson State	L 48–55	0–2	Brooks Gymnasium (578); Johnson City, TN
November 12, 2024*; 11:00 am, ESPN+		at Gardner–Webb	W 44–42	1–2	Paul Porter Arena (1,500); Boiling Springs, NC
November 15, 2024*; 7:00 pm, ESPN+		at Lipscomb	L 61–62	1–3	Allen Arena (225); Nashville, TN
November 19, 2024*; 7:00 pm, FloCollege		at Campbell	L 51–58	1–4	Gore Arena (771); Buies Creek, NC
November 23, 2024*; 2:00 pm, ESPN+		Tennessee Tech	W 53–48	2–4	Brooks Gymnasium (382); Johnson City, TN
November 27, 2024*; 7:00 pm, ESPN+		Presbyterian	W 64–31	3–4	Brooks Gymnasium (316); Johnson City, TN
December 1, 2024*; 2:00 pm, ESPN+		Memphis	W 78–71	4–4	Brooks Gymnasium (812); Johnson City, TN
December 6, 2024*; 10:30 am, ESPN+		at No. 15 West Virginia	L 40–85	4–5	WVU Coliseum (8,489); Morgantown, WV
December 8, 2024*; 2:00 pm, ESPN+		UVA Wise	W 72–42	5–5	Brooks Gymnasium (462); Johnson City, TN
December 13, 2024*; 7:00 pm, ESPN+		Radford	W 68–45	6–5	Brooks Gymnasium (426); Johnson City, TN
December 17, 2024*; 4:30 pm, ESPN+		at UNC Asheville	W 53–47	7–5	Kimmel Arena (316); Asheville, NC
December 20, 2024*; 1:00 pm		vs. IU Indy; FGCU Holiday Tournament	W 54–41	8–5	Alico Arena; Fort Myers, FL
December 21, 2024*; 3:30 pm, ESPN+		at Florida Gulf Coast; FGCU Holiday Tournament	L 54–67	8–6	Alico Arena (1,444); Fort Myers, FL
January 2, 2025*; 7:00 pm, ESPN+		Tusculum	W 103–55	9–6	Brooks Gymnasium (389); Johnson City, TN
SoCon regular season
January 9, 2025; 7:00 pm, ESPN+		at UNC Greensboro	L 43–64	9–7 (0–1)	Fleming Gymnasium (228); Greensboro, NC
January 12, 2025; 1:00 pm, ESPN+		at Western Carolina	L 60–64	9–8 (0–2)	Ramsey Center (613); Cullowhee, NC
January 16, 2025; 7:00 pm, ESPN+		Mercer	W 70–46	10–8 (1–2)	Brooks Gymnasium (283); Johnson City, TN
January 18, 2025; 2:00 pm, ESPN+		Samford	W 69–48	11–8 (2–2)	Brooks Gymnasium (341); Johnson City, TN
January 25, 2025; 2:00 pm, ESPN+		at Chattanooga	L 46–48	11–9 (2–3)	McKenzie Arena (1,495); Chattanooga, TN
January 30, 2025; 7:00 pm, ESPN+		at Furman	W 72–62	12–9 (3–3)	Hayes Gym (217); Tigerville, SC
February 1, 2025; 2:00 pm, ESPN+		at Wofford	W 63–50	13–9 (4–3)	Jerry Richardson Indoor Stadium (778); Spartanburg, SC
February 6, 2025; 7:00 pm, ESPN+		Western Carolina	W 77–64	14–9 (5–3)	Brooks Gymnasium (381); Johnson City, TN
February 8, 2025; 1:30 pm, ESPN+		UNC Greensboro	L 56–61 ^{OT}	14–10 (5–4)	Freedom Hall Civic Center (5,472); Johnson City, TN
February 13, 2025; 6:00 pm, ESPN+		at Samford	L 43–50	14–11 (5–5)	Pete Hanna Center (213); Homewood, AL
February 15, 2025; 2:00 pm, ESPN+		at Mercer	W 70–67	15–11 (6–5)	Hawkins Arena (1,549); Macon, GA
February 22, 2025; 2:00 pm, ESPN+		Chattanooga	L 46–51	15–12 (6–6)	Brooks Gymnasium (612); Johnson City, TN
February 27, 2025; 7:00 pm, ESPN+		Wofford	W 63–57	16–12 (7–6)	Brooks Gymnasium (733); Johnson City, TN
March 1, 2025; 2:00 pm, ESPN+		Furman	W 62–50	17–12 (8–6)	Brooks Gymnasium (824); Johnson City, TN
SoCon tournament
March 6, 2025; 3:30 pm, ESPN+	(3)	vs. (6) Furman; Quarterfinals	L 58–64	17–13	Harrah's Cherokee Center; Asheville, NC
*Non-conference game. ^{#}Rankings from AP Poll. (#) Tournament seedings in parentheses. All times are in Eastern.
