= 2024–25 Chattanooga Mocs women's basketball team =

American college basketball season

2024–25 Chattanooga Mocs women's basketball

WNIT, second round
- Conference: Southern Conference
- Record: 17–15 (9–5 SoCon)
- Head coach: Deandra Schirmer (1st season)
- Associate head coach: Tianni Kelly
- Assistant coaches: Nicole Heyn; Mallory Odell; Alexis Uffmann
- Home arena: McKenzie Arena

2024–25 Southern Conference women's basketball standings
	Conf.				Overall
Team	W		L	PCT	W		L	PCT
UNC Greensboro †	13	–	1	.929	25	–	7	.781
Chattanooga	9	–	5	.643	17	–	15	.531
East Tennessee State	8	–	6	.571	17	–	13	.567
Wofford	8	–	6	.571	17	–	12	.586
Samford	7	–	7	.500	12	–	19	.387
Furman	5	–	9	.357	16	–	16	.500
Mercer	3	–	11	.214	8	–	22	.267
Western Carolina	3	–	11	.214	13	–	17	.433
† 2025 SoCon tournament winner

The 2024–25 Chattanooga Mocs women's basketball team represented the University of Tennessee at Chattanooga during the 2024–25 NCAA Division I women's basketball season. The Mocs, who were led by first-year head coach Deandra Schirmer, played their home games at McKenzie Arena in Chattanooga, Tennessee as members of the Southern Conference (SoCon).

They finished the season 17–15, 9–5 in SoCon play, to finish in second place.

== Previous season ==
The Mocs finished the 2023–24 season 28–5, 13–1 in SoCon play, to finish as SoCon regular-season champions. They defeated Western Carolina, Mercer and UNC Greensboro to win the SoCon tournament championship, heading to the NCAA tournament for the third consecutive year. They received the #14 seed in the Portland Regional 4, where they would fall to #3 region seed NC State in the first round.

On March 26, 2024, it was announced that head coach Shawn Poppie would be leaving the program, in order to take the head coaching position at Clemson. On April 4, the school announced that they would be hiring Valdosta State head coach Deandra Schirmer as Poppie's successor.

== Preseason ==
On October 16, 2024, the SoCon released their preseason coaches poll. Chattanooga was picked to finish sixth in the SoCon regular season.

=== Preseason rankings ===
SoCon preseason poll
Predicted finish	Team	Votes (1st place)
1	Wofford	49 (7)
2	UNC Greensboro	42 (1)
T–3	Furman	31
T–3	Samford	31
5	East Tennessee State	25
6	Chattanooga	23
7	Mercer	13
8	Western Carolina	10

=== Preseason All-SoCon Team ===
Preseason All-SoCon Team
Player	Position	Year
Kalifa Ford	Guard/forward	Graduate student
Sigrún Ólafsdóttir	Guard	Senior

== Roster ==
2024–25 Chattanooga Mocs women's basketball team
Players
Coaches

Pos.	#	Name	Height	Year	Previous school	Hometown
G	2	Jade Moore	5 ft 7 in (1.7 m)	Sr	North Alabama	St. Louis, MO
F/C	3	Takia Davis	6 ft 2 in (1.88 m)	Sr	USC Upstate	Calhoun, GA
G	4	Masa Buzic	5 ft 10 in (1.78 m)	Fr	ZKK Ras	Belgrade, Serbia
G	5	Sigrún Ólafsdóttir	5 ft 9 in (1.75 m)	Sr	Flensborg High School	Hafnarfjörður, Iceland
G/F	10	Izzy McPherson	5 ft 10 in (1.78 m)	Fr	Sycamore High School	Pleasant View, TN
G	11	Caia Elisaldez	5 ft 5 in (1.65 m)	So	Mater Dei High School	Whittier, CA
G/F	12	Kalifa Ford	5 ft 10 in (1.78 m)	GS	Valdosta State	Bono, AR
G	13	Taylor Searcey	5 ft 8 in (1.73 m)	Sr	Valdosta State	Lincoln, NE
F/C	15	Frode Flos van der Schans	6 ft 4 in (1.93 m)	RS So	Orange Lions Academy	Amsterdam, Netherlands
G/F	21	Ava Card	6 ft 0 in (1.83 m)	Fr	Saint James School	Montgomery, AL
F	22	Gianna Corbitt	6 ft 1 in (1.85 m)	Fr	Blanche Ely High School	Oakland Park, FL
F	25	Kailyn Farrell	6 ft 1 in (1.85 m)	Sr	Walters State Community College	Tullahoma, TN
F/C	32	Brooke Anya	6 ft 0 in (1.83 m)	GS	Hofstra	Washington, D.C.
F	33	Karsen Murphy	6 ft 0 in (1.83 m)	Sr	Montana	Glendive, MT

Head coach

- Deandra Schirmer (USC Aiken)

Assistant coach(es)

- Tianni Kelly (Charleston (WV))
- Nicole Heyn (Texas A&M International)
- Mallory Odell (Valdosta State)
- Alexis Uffmann (Columbia (MO))

Legend

- (C) Team captain
- (S) Suspended
- (I) Ineligible
- (W) Walk-on
- Injured
- Current redshirt

Roster
Last update: May 15, 2025

== Schedule and results ==
Date time, TV	Rank^{#}	Opponent^{#}	Result	Record	Site (attendance) city, state
Non-conference regular season
November 4, 2024*; 6:00 p.m., ESPN+		Shorter	W 66–49	1–0	McKenzie Arena (1,374); Chattanooga, TN
November 7, 2024*; 6:00 p.m., ESPN+		Tennessee Tech	L 46–48	1–1	McKenzie Arena (1,120); Chattanooga, TN
November 11, 2024*; 5:30 p.m.		at North Carolina Central	W 75–36	2–1	McDougald–McLendon Arena (92); Durham, NC
November 14, 2024*; 6:00 p.m., ESPN+		Troy	L 66–76	2–2	McKenzie Arena (1,235); Chattanooga, TN
November 17, 2024*; 3:00 p.m., SECN+		at Mississippi State	L 44–69	2–3	Humphrey Coliseum (4,037); Starkville, MS
November 20, 2024*; 6:00 p.m., ESPN+		King	W 75–34	3–3	McKenzie Arena (1,289); Chattanooga, TN
November 25, 2024*; 11:00 a.m., ESPN+		Lipscomb	W 66–60	4–3	McKenzie Arena (3,734); Chattanooga, TN
November 29, 2024*; 1:00 p.m.		vs. Penn; FGCU Homewood Suites Tournament	L 61–74	4–4	Alico Arena (77); Fort Myers, FL
November 30, 2024*; 4:00 p.m., ESPN+		at Florida Gulf Coast; FGCU Homewood Suites Tournament	L 53–61	4–5	Alico Arena (1,505); Fort Myers, FL
December 8, 2024*; 2:00 p.m., ESPN+		Kennesaw State	L 42–64	4–6	McKenzie Arena (1,412); Chattanooga, TN
December 12, 2024*; 6:30 p.m., ESPN+		at Bellarmine	L 66–67	4–7	Knights Hall (408); Louisville, KY
December 15, 2024*; 1:00 p.m., B1G+		at No. 24 Nebraska	L 42–66	4–8	Pinnacle Bank Arena (4,637); Lincoln, NE
December 21, 2024*; 2:00 p.m., ESPN+		Salem	W 93–34	5–8	McKenzie Arena (1,853); Chattanooga, TN
SoCon regular season
January 9, 2025; 6:00 p.m., ESPN+		at Western Carolina	W 67–56	6–8 (1–0)	Ramsey Center (437); Cullowhee, NC
January 11, 2025; 2:00 p.m., ESPN+		at UNC Greensboro	L 48–62	6–9 (1–1)	Fleming Gymnasium (171); Greensboro, NC
January 16, 2025; 6:00 p.m., ESPN+		Samford	W 69–63	7–9 (2–1)	McKenzie Arena (1,746); Chattanooga, TN
January 18, 2025; 2:00 p.m., ESPN+		Mercer	W 60–37	8–9 (3–1)	McKenzie Arena (1,511); Chattanooga, TN
January 25, 2025; 2:00 p.m., ESPN+		East Tennessee State	W 48–46	9–9 (4–1)	McKenzie Arena (1,495); Chattanooga, TN
January 30, 2025; 7:00 p.m., ESPN+		at Wofford	L 54–57	9–10 (4–2)	Jerry Richardson Indoor Stadium (541); Spartanburg, SC
February 1, 2025; 2:00 p.m., ESPN+		at Furman	W 68–60	10–10 (5–2)	Hayes Gym (487); Tigerville, SC
February 6, 2025; 6:00 p.m., ESPN+		UNC Greensboro	L 50–58	10–11 (5–3)	McKenzie Arena (1,478); Chattanooga, TN
February 8, 2025; 2:00 p.m., ESPN+		Western Carolina	W 74–59	11–11 (6–3)	McKenzie Arena (1,723); Chattanooga, TN
February 13, 2025; 7:00 p.m., ESPN+		at Mercer	W 69–39	12–11 (7–3)	Hawkins Arena (1,754); Macon, GA
February 15, 2025; 3:00 p.m., ESPN+		at Samford	L 50–55	12–12 (7–4)	Pete Hanna Center (417); Homewood, AL
February 22, 2025; 2:00 p.m., ESPN+		at East Tennessee State	W 51–46	13–12 (8–4)	Brooks Gymnasium (612); Johnson City, TN
February 27, 2025; 6:00 p.m., ESPN+		Furman	L 70–74 ^{OT}	13–13 (8–5)	McKenzie Arena (1,664); Chattanooga, TN
March 1, 2025; 2:00 p.m., ESPN+		Wofford	W 69–61	14–13 (9–5)	McKenzie Arena (1,709); Chattanooga, TN
SoCon tournament
March 6, 2025; 1:15 p.m., ESPN+	(2)	vs. (7) Mercer; Quarterfinals	W 68–47	15–13	Harrah's Cherokee Center; Asheville, NC
March 7, 2025; 1:15 p.m., ESPN+	(2)	vs. (6) Furman; Semifinals	W 63–55	16–13	Harrah's Cherokee Center (2,905); Asheville, NC
March 9, 2025; 12:00 p.m., ESPNU/ESPN+	(2)	vs. (1) UNC Greensboro; Championship	L 57–64 ^{OT}	16–14	Harrah's Cherokee Center (1,259); Asheville, NC
WNIT
March 22, 2025*; 5:00 p.m., ESPN+		Alabama A&M; First round	W 53–49	17–14	McKenzie Arena (640); Chattanooga, TN
March 24, 2025*; 7:00 p.m., ESPN+		at Troy; Second round	L 72–85	17–15	Trojan Arena (1,853); Troy, AL
*Non-conference game. ^{#}Rankings from AP poll. (#) Tournament seedings in parentheses. All times are in Eastern.
