= 2024–25 Furman Paladins women's basketball team =

American college basketball season

2024–25 Furman Paladins women's basketball
- Conference: Southern Conference
- Record: 16–16 (5–9 SoCon)
- Head coach: Pierre Curtis (2nd season)
- Assistant coaches: Dr. Ashley Johnson; Lauren Johnson; Jauwan Scaife; Samantha Michel
- Home arena: Hayes Gym

2024–25 Southern Conference women's basketball standings
| | Conf. | | | | Overall |
| Team | W | | L | PCT | W | | L | PCT |
|---|---|---|---|---|---|---|---|---|
| UNC Greensboro † | 13 | – | 1 | .929 | 25 | – | 7 | .781 |
| Chattanooga | 9 | – | 5 | .643 | 17 | – | 15 | .531 |
| East Tennessee State | 8 | – | 6 | .571 | 17 | – | 13 | .567 |
| Wofford | 8 | – | 6 | .571 | 17 | – | 12 | .586 |
| Samford | 7 | – | 7 | .500 | 12 | – | 19 | .387 |
| Furman | 5 | – | 9 | .357 | 16 | – | 16 | .500 |
| Mercer | 3 | – | 11 | .214 | 8 | – | 22 | .267 |
| Western Carolina | 3 | – | 11 | .214 | 13 | – | 17 | .433 |
† 2025 SoCon tournament winner

The 2024–25 Furman Paladins women's basketball team represented Furman University during the 2024–25 NCAA Division I women's basketball season. The Paladins, who were led by second-year head coach Pierre Curtis, played their home games at Hayes Gym on the campus of North Greenville University in Tigerville, South Carolina, with two home games at Bon Secours Wellness Arena in Greenville, South Carolina, as their on-campus home court, Timmons Arena, is currently undergoing renovations. They competed as members of the Southern Conference (SoCon).

== Previous season ==
The Paladins finished the 2023–24 season 15–16, 5–9 in SoCon play, to finish in seventh place. They were defeated by UNC Greensboro in the quarterfinals of the SoCon tournament.

== Preseason ==
On October 16, 2024, the SoCon released their preseason coaches poll. Furman was picked to finish tied for third in the SoCon regular season.

=== Preseason rankings ===
SoCon preseason poll
| Predicted finish | Team | Votes (1st place) |
|---|---|---|
| 1 | Wofford | 49 (7) |
| 2 | UNC Greensboro | 42 (1) |
| T-3 | Furman | 31 |
| T-3 | Samford | 31 |
| 5 | East Tennessee State | 25 |
| 6 | Chattanooga | 23 |
| 7 | Mercer | 13 |
| 8 | Western Carolina | 10 |

=== Preseason All-SoCon Team ===
Preseason All-SoCon Team
| Player | Position | Year |
|---|---|---|
| Kate Johnson | Forward | Senior |
| Jada Session | Forward | Senior |
| Tate Walters | Guard | Junior |

== Roster ==
2024–25 Furman Paladins women's basketball team
Players
Coaches

| Pos. | # | Name | Height | Year | Previous school | Hometown |
|---|---|---|---|---|---|---|
| G | 0 | Jayda Pinder | 5 ft 7 in (1.7 m) | So | Academy of the Holy Names | Tampa, Florida |
| G | 1 | Bella LaChance | 5 ft 6 in (1.68 m) | GS | Vanderbilt | Davie, Florida |
| F | 2 | Clare Coyle | 6 ft 1 in (1.85 m) | Fr | Bishop Kenny High School | Jacksonville, Florida |
| F | 3 | Jada Session | 6 ft 1 in (1.85 m) | Sr | Luella High School | Locust Grove, Georgia |
| G | 4 | Tate Walters | 5 ft 9 in (1.75 m) | GS | Buford High School | Buford, Georgia |
| G | 5 | Raina McGowens | 5 ft 10 in (1.78 m) | Fr | Wren High School | Pelzer, South Carolina |
| G | 10 | Chantelle Stuart | 5 ft 9 in (1.75 m) | Fr | Crestwood Prep | Scarborough, Ontario |
| G | 11 | Samaria Taylor | 5 ft 7 in (1.7 m) | Fr | Fulton High School | Knoxville, Tennessee |
| G | 12 | Asa Snyder | 5 ft 7 in (1.7 m) | So | Porter-Gaud School | Charleston, South Carolina |
| G/F | 13 | Hilary Englert | 5 ft 11 in (1.8 m) | Fr | The Bolles School | Ponte Vedra, Florida |
| F | 14 | Hanna Hansson | 6 ft 4 in (1.93 m) | RS So | Riksidrottsgymnasiet Lulea | Stockholm, Sweden |
| G | 20 | Sydney Ryan | 5 ft 11 in (1.8 m) | Jr | Brentwood High School | Nashville, Tennessee |
| G | 21 | Niveya Henley | 6 ft 0 in (1.83 m) | RS Jr | Montverde Academy | Seattle, Washington |
| G | 24 | Jaelyn Acker | 5 ft 7 in (1.7 m) | RS Jr | Germantown High School | Richfield, Wisconsin |
| F | 42 | Kate Johnson | 6 ft 3 in (1.91 m) | Sr | Cherokee High School | Canton, Georgia |

Head coach

- Pierre Curtis (James Madison)

Assistant coach(es)

- Dr. Ashley Johnson (LSU)
- Lauren Johnson (Southern Wesleyan)
- Jauwan Scaife (Ball State)
- Samantha Michel (Anderson (SC))

Legend

- (C) Team captain
- (S) Suspended
- (I) Ineligible
- (W) Walk-on
- Injured
- Current redshirt

Roster
Last update: May 21, 2025

== Schedule and results ==
| Date time, TV | Rank^{#} | Opponent^{#} | Result | Record | Site (attendance) city, state |
Non-conference regular season
| November 4, 2024*; 5:30 pm | | at South Carolina State | W 60–54 | 1–0 | SHM Memorial Center (511); Orangeburg, SC |
| November 7, 2024*; 7:00 pm | | Erskine | W 100–31 | 2–0 | Hayes Gym (285); Tigerville, SC |
| November 10, 2024*; 1:00 pm, SECN+ | | at Georgia | L 46–74 | 2–1 | Stegeman Coliseum (1,863); Athens, GA |
| November 14, 2024*; 6:00 pm, ESPN+ | | at East Carolina | L 51–67 | 2–2 | Williams Arena (884); Greenville, NC |
| November 19, 2024*; 7:00 pm, ESPN+ | | USC Upstate | W 81–53 | 3–2 | Hayes Gym (263); Tigerville, SC |
| November 23, 2024*; 2:00 pm | | Bob Jones | W 101–47 | 4–2 | Hayes Gym (127); Tigerville, SC |
| November 26, 2024*; 2:30 pm | | vs. Campbell; GSU Thanksgiving Tournament | L 72–82 | 4–3 | GSU Convocation Center (285); Atlanta, GA |
| November 27, 2024*; 12:00 pm, ESPN+ | | at Georgia State; GSU Thanksgiving Tournament | W 85–74 | 5–3 | GSU Convocation Center (320); Atlanta, GA |
| November 28, 2024*; 2:30 pm | | vs. Purdue Fort Wayne; GSU Thanksgiving Tournament | W 88–84 ^{OT} | 6–3 | GSU Convocation Center (285); Atlanta, GA |
| December 4, 2024*; 11:00 am, FloHoops | | at Elon | W 61–57 | 7–3 | Schar Center (2,783); Elon, NC |
| December 8, 2024*; 2:00 pm, ESPN+ | | Charleston Southern | W 58–42 | 8–3 | Hayes Gym (377); Tigerville, SC |
| December 11, 2024*; 6:30 pm, ESPN+ | | at UNC Asheville | W 68–50 | 9–3 | Kimmel Arena (723); Asheville, NC |
| December 18, 2024*; 3:00 pm, B1G+ | | vs. Boise State; Husky Classic | L 65–74 | 9–4 | Alaska Airlines Arena; Seattle, WA |
| December 19, 2024*; 5:00 pm, B1G+ | | at Washington; Husky Classic | L 43–71 | 9–5 | Alaska Airlines Arena (1,780); Seattle, WA |
| December 30, 2024*; 1:00 pm, ESPN+ | | at North Carolina Central | L 76–77 | 9–6 | McDougald–McLendon Arena (345); Durham, NC |
| January 1, 2025*; 2:00 pm | | Southern Wesleyan | W 107–51 | 10–6 | Hayes Gym (237); Tigerville, SC |
SoCon regular season
| January 12, 2025; 2:00 pm, ESPN+ | | at Wofford | L 51–68 | 10–7 (0–1) | Jerry Richardson Indoor Stadium (548); Spartanburg, SC |
| January 16, 2025; 7:00 pm, ESPN+ | | Western Carolina | W 82–73 | 11–7 (1–1) | Hayes Gym (319); Tigerville, SC |
| January 18, 2025; 2:00 pm, ESPN+ | | UNC Greensboro | L 54–64 | 11–8 (1–2) | Bon Secours Wellness Arena (877); Greenville, SC |
| January 23, 2025; 7:00 pm, ESPN+ | | at Samford | L 62–77 | 11–9 (1–3) | Pete Hanna Center (231); Homewood, AL |
| January 25, 2025; 2:00 pm, ESPN+ | | at Mercer | W 57–47 | 12–9 (2–3) | Hawkins Arena (1,619); Macon, GA |
| January 30, 2025; 7:00 pm, ESPN+ | | East Tennessee State | L 62–72 | 12–10 (2–4) | Hayes Gym (217); Tigerville, SC |
| February 1, 2025; 2:00 pm, ESPN+ | | Chattanooga | L 60–68 | 12–11 (2–5) | Hayes Gym (487); Tigerville, SC |
| February 8, 2025; 2:00 pm, ESPN+ | | Wofford | W 93–88 ^{2OT} | 13–11 (3–5) | Bon Secours Wellness Arena (2,007); Greenville, SC |
| February 13, 2025; 6:00 pm, ESPN+ | | at UNC Greensboro | L 51–55 | 13–12 (3–6) | Fleming Gymnasium (322); Greensboro, NC |
| February 15, 2025; 1:00 pm, ESPN+ | | at Western Carolina | L 57–70 | 13–13 (3–7) | Ramsey Center (1,294); Cullowhee, NC |
| February 20, 2025; 7:00 pm, ESPN+ | | Mercer | W 72–70 | 14–13 (4–7) | Hayes Gym (411); Tigerville, SC |
| February 22, 2025; 7:00 pm, ESPN+ | | Samford | L 62–73 | 14–14 (4–8) | Hayes Gym (362); Tigerville, SC |
| February 27, 2025; 6:00 pm, ESPN+ | | at Chattanooga | W 74–70 ^{OT} | 15–14 (5–8) | McKenzie Arena (1,664); Chattanooga, TN |
| March 1, 2025; 2:00 pm, ESPN+ | | at East Tennessee State | L 50–62 | 15–15 (5–9) | Brooks Gymnasium (362); Johnson City, TN |
SoCon tournament
| March 6, 2025; 3:30 pm, ESPN+ | (6) | vs. (3) East Tennessee State; Quarterfinals | W 64–58 | 16–15 | Harrah's Cherokee Center; Asheville, NC |
| March 7, 2025; 1:15 pm, ESPN+ | (6) | vs. (2) Chattanooga; Semifinals | L 55–63 | 16–16 | Harrah's Cherokee Center (2,905); Asheville, NC |
*Non-conference game. ^{#}Rankings from AP Poll. (#) Tournament seedings in parentheses. All times are in Eastern.
