= Michael Bayne =

American athletic coach

Coach Michael Bayne
Biographical details
- Born: South Carolina
- Education: University of South Carolina

Coaching career (HC unless noted)
- 2006-2010: Brevard College
- 2012-2014: North Greenville University

Accomplishments and honors

Championships
- NCCAA Victory Bowl 2014

Michael Bayne is an athletic coach who has led teams in many sports, and in schools all across North and South Carolina. He served as the head golf coach and special teams coordinator at Brevard College from 2006 until 2010, where he then worked as the head track, cross country and lacrosse coach and special teams coordinator for North Greenville University. He grew up in South Carolina, receiving his B.A. degree from University of South Carolina in 1980. Bayne has provided services as the head and assistant coach for many different schools and team sports, from 1984 to the present. In addition to his coaching career, Bayne has been an upstanding educator and administrator.

In 1998, he received the Guinness World Record for the most three-point shots made in one game by a team (32); that team also holds the tie for second most three-point goals (29). His athletes have been made All-American 12 times in the NCAA and NCCAA. Bayne has coached players and teams that hold seven South Carolina state records for the South Carolina High School League. He has been inducted into the WCOS Charleston Hall of Fame, has won over 600 games in his career, and has been named A.D. or Coach of the Year around twenty times.

== Coaching career ==
From 1984 to 1987, Bayne held the position of athletic director, as well as head coach for the football, baseball, basketball and track teams in Orangeburg School District Seven. In July 1987 until June 1992, he would then move on to become the head coach for the basketball and track teams of Denmark-Olar High School, as well as being the offensive coordinator for their football team. During this period, Bayne was also the assistant basketball coach for Denmark Technical College (1988). From July 1992 until June 1994, Bayne worked at St. George High School; there he was the head football, tennis and track coach, as well as teaching social studies and driver's education. In 1993, Bayne gave his time and coaching experience to the Dorchester Eagles POP Warner football team.

In July 1994, Bayne transplanted to Charleston County, South Carolina, where he would remain until 2006. In Charleston County's Schools he would operate not only as head coach for football, basketball, track and baseball; there he would also hold the positions of administrative assistant, athletic director, occupational specialist, CTE, firefighter, and first responder. Bayne's tenure at Garrett Academy of Technology of Charleston from 1996 until 1999 would include him holding positions as the head coach for cross country and basketball, with this team also being the one to hold the Guinness World Record for "Most Three Point Goals Made in One Game by a Team".

From 2002 until 2003 Bayne was also the assistant baseball coach at Charleston Southern University. After serving with Charleston County Schools for over a decade, in December 2006 Coach Bayne was hired at Brevard College as their director of football operations, assistant football coach, special teams coordinator, recruiting coordinator and running back coach. In February 2010, Bayne entered a five-year tenure with North Greenville University, during that time sustaining positions as head coach for women's lacrosse, track and cross country, as well as being the assistant football coach. On May 28, 2015, Brevard College announced that Bayne would be returning to serve the Tornados as head coach for their track program, as well as the special teams coordinator for the Brevard College football team.

== Honors received ==
Year	Honor/Award Received	Location
1992	Honored by South Carolina Senate Resolution for eight consecutive "Coach of the Year" awards	SC
1998	Guinness World Record for "most three point shots made in one game by a team (32)	Charleston, SC
2012	National Staff Member of the Year Award-NCCAA Football	North Greenville University, Tigerville, SC
2013	Coached Freddie Martino- NCCAA All American (now plays in the NFL)	North Greenville University, Tigerville, SC
2014	Coached Justin Gravely- NCCAA D-2 Specialist of the Year	North Greenville University, Tigerville, SC
2014	NCCAA Victory Bowl Champions - Football Staff Member	North Greenville University, Tigerville, SC
