= 2024–25 Wofford Terriers women's basketball team =

American college basketball season

2024–25 Wofford Terriers women's basketball
- Conference: Southern Conference
- Record: 17–12 (8–6 SoCon)
- Head coach: Jimmy Garrity (9th season)
- Associate head coach: Mike Merrill
- Assistant coaches: Trent Bunn; Ashley Raley-Ross
- Home arena: Jerry Richardson Indoor Stadium

2024–25 Southern Conference women's basketball standings
| | Conf. | | | | Overall |
| Team | W | | L | PCT | W | | L | PCT |
|---|---|---|---|---|---|---|---|---|
| UNC Greensboro † | 13 | – | 1 | .929 | 25 | – | 7 | .781 |
| Chattanooga | 9 | – | 5 | .643 | 17 | – | 15 | .531 |
| East Tennessee State | 8 | – | 6 | .571 | 17 | – | 13 | .567 |
| Wofford | 8 | – | 6 | .571 | 17 | – | 12 | .586 |
| Samford | 7 | – | 7 | .500 | 12 | – | 19 | .387 |
| Furman | 5 | – | 9 | .357 | 16 | – | 16 | .500 |
| Mercer | 3 | – | 11 | .214 | 8 | – | 22 | .267 |
| Western Carolina | 3 | – | 11 | .214 | 13 | – | 17 | .433 |
† 2025 SoCon tournament winner

The 2024–25 Wofford Terriers women's basketball team represented Wofford College during the 2024–25 NCAA Division I women's basketball season. The Terriers, who were led by ninth-year head coach Jimmy Garrity, played their home games at Jerry Richardson Indoor Stadium in Spartanburg, South Carolina as members of the Southern Conference (SoCon).

== Previous season ==
The Terriers finished the 2023–24 season 17–13, 8–6 in SoCon play, to finish in a three-way tie for second place. They defeated Samford, before falling to UNC Greensboro in the semifinals of the SoCon tournament.

== Preseason ==
On October 16, 2024, the SoCon released their preseason coaches poll. Wofford was picked to finish first in the SoCon regular season.

=== Preseason rankings ===
SoCon preseason poll
| Predicted finish | Team | Votes (1st place) |
|---|---|---|
| 1 | Wofford | 49 (7) |
| 2 | UNC Greensboro | 42 (1) |
| T-3 | Furman | 31 |
| T-3 | Samford | 31 |
| 5 | East Tennessee State | 25 |
| 6 | Chattanooga | 23 |
| 7 | Mercer | 13 |
| 8 | Western Carolina | 10 |

=== Preseason Player of the Year ===
Preseason Player of the Year
| Player | Position | Year |
|---|---|---|
| Rachael Rose | Guard | Senior |

=== Preseason All-SoCon Team ===
Preseason All-SoCon Team
| Player | Position | Year |
|---|---|---|
| Helen Matthews | Guard | Graduate student |
| Rachael Rose | Guard | Senior |

== Roster ==
2024–25 Wofford Terriers women's basketball team
Players
Coaches

| Pos. | # | Name | Height | Year | Previous school | Hometown |
|---|---|---|---|---|---|---|
| G | 1 | Madi Hawk | 5 ft 10 in (1.78 m) | Fr | Jefferson County High School | Jefferson City, Tennessee |
| G | 2 | Maddie Heiss | 5 ft 10 in (1.78 m) | So | Bishop Lynch High School | Dallas, Texas |
| G/F | 3 | Evangelia Paulk | 6 ft 0 in (1.83 m) | So | Asheville High School | Asheville, North Carolina |
| G | 5 | Helen Matthews (5Y) | 5 ft 10 in (1.78 m) | Sr | Kaiapoi High School | Kaiapoi, New Zealand |
| G | 10 | Libby Privett | 5 ft 8 in (1.73 m) | Jr | Madison Academy | Huntsville, Alabama |
| G | 12 | Rachael Rose | 5 ft 7 in (1.7 m) | Sr | USC Upstate | Scranton, Pennsylvania |
| F | 13 | Toni Warren | 5 ft 11 in (1.8 m) | Fr | Cherokee High School | Canton, Georgia |
| G | 15 | Molly Masingale | 5 ft 9 in (1.75 m) | Fr | McMinn Central High School | Englewood, Tennessee |
| F | 21 | Mia Flor | 6 ft 2 in (1.88 m) | Jr | Idaho State | Missoula, Montana |
| G | 24 | Sara Deidda | 5 ft 11 in (1.8 m) | So | Trgovacka škola Zagreb | Zagreb, Croatia |
| F | 81 | Queen Ikhiuwu | 6 ft 1 in (1.85 m) | So | Tulsa | Madrid, Spain |

Head coach

- Jimmy Garrity (Elon)

Assistant coach(es)

- Mike Merrill (UNC Wilmington)
- Trent Bunn (North Carolina)
- Ashley Raley-Ross (Queens (NC))

Legend

- (C) Team captain
- (S) Suspended
- (I) Ineligible
- (W) Walk-on
- (5Y) Fifth-year senior
- Injured
- Current redshirt

Roster
Last update: May 20, 2025

== Schedule and results ==
| Date time, TV | Rank^{#} | Opponent^{#} | Result | Record | Site (attendance) city, state |
Non-conference regular season
| November 4, 2024*; 7:30 pm, ESPN+ | | Newberry | W 76–27 | 1–0 | Jerry Richardson Indoor Stadium (597); Spartanburg, SC |
| November 9, 2024*; 2:00 pm | | at North Carolina Central | W 75–56 | 2–0 | McDougald–McLendon Arena (176); Durham, NC |
| November 12, 2024*; 6:00 pm, SECN+ | | at No. 20 Kentucky | L 42–76 | 2–1 | Memorial Coliseum (3,844); Lexington, KY |
| November 16, 2024*; 8:00 pm, ESPN+ | | at Davidson | L 63–74 | 2–2 | John M. Belk Arena (792); Davidson, NC |
| November 19, 2024*; 7:00 pm, ESPN+ | | Southern Wesleyan | W 95–35 | 3–2 | Jerry Richardson Indoor Stadium (153); Spartanburg, SC |
| November 21, 2024*; 7:00 pm, ESPN+ | | High Point | W 71–65 | 4–2 | Jerry Richardson Indoor Stadium (311); Spartanburg, SC |
| November 26, 2024*; 11:00 am, ESPN+ | | UNC Asheville | W 75–56 | 5–2 | Jerry Richardson Indoor Stadium (1,324); Spartanburg, SC |
| December 7, 2024*; 6:00 pm, ESPN+/CW 62 | | Appalachian State | W 71–63 | 6–2 | Jerry Richardson Indoor Stadium (440); Spartanburg, SC |
| December 18, 2024*; 7:00 pm, ACCN | | at No. 9 Duke | L 58–93 | 6–3 | Cameron Indoor Stadium (1,768); Durham, NC |
| December 21, 2024*; 12:00 pm, ESPN+ | | at Lehigh | L 64–69 | 6–4 | Stabler Arena (512); Bethlehem, PA |
| December 29, 2024*; 2:00 pm, SECN | | at No. 2 South Carolina | L 47–93 | 6–5 | Colonial Life Arena (17,711); Columbia, SC |
| January 2, 2025*; 6:00 pm, ESPN+ | | Erskine | W 107–35 | 7–5 | Jerry Richardson Indoor Stadium (294); Spartanburg, SC |
| January 4, 2025*; 2:00 pm, ESPN+ | | King | W 73–38 | 8–5 | Jerry Richardson Indoor Stadium (354); Spartanburg, SC |
SoCon regular season
| January 12, 2025; 2:00 pm, ESPN+ | | Furman | W 68–51 | 9–5 (1–0) | Jerry Richardson Indoor Stadium (548); Spartanburg, SC |
| January 16, 2025; 7:00 pm, ESPN+ | | UNC Greensboro | W 62–39 | 10–5 (2–0) | Jerry Richardson Indoor Stadium (365); Spartanburg, SC |
| January 18, 2025; 2:00 pm, ESPN+ | | Western Carolina | W 66–53 | 11–5 (3–0) | Jerry Richardson Indoor Stadium (569); Spartanburg, SC |
| January 23, 2025; 7:00 pm, ESPN+ | | at Mercer | W 61–51 | 12–5 (4–0) | Hawkins Arena (1,583); Macon, GA |
| January 25, 2025; 3:00 pm, ESPN+ | | at Samford | W 84–49 | 13–5 (5–0) | Pete Hanna Center (317); Homewood, AL |
| January 30, 2025; 7:00 pm, ESPN+ | | Chattanooga | W 57–54 | 14–5 (6–0) | Jerry Richardson Indoor Stadium (541); Spartanburg, SC |
| February 1, 2025; 2:00 pm, ESPN+ | | East Tennessee State | L 50–63 | 14–6 (6–1) | Jerry Richardson Indoor Stadium (778); Spartanburg, SC |
| February 8, 2025; 2:00 pm, ESPN+ | | at Furman | L 88–93 ^{2OT} | 14–7 (6–2) | Bon Secours Wellness Arena (2,007); Greenville, SC |
| February 13, 2025; 6:00 pm, ESPN+ | | at Western Carolina | W 70–68 | 15–7 (7–2) | Ramsey Center (623); Cullowhee, NC |
| February 15, 2025; 2:00 pm, ESPN+ | | at UNC Greensboro | L 60–68 | 15–8 (7–3) | Fleming Gymnasium (322); Greensboro, NC |
| February 20, 2025; 6:00 pm, ESPN+/CW 62 | | Samford | L 54–62 | 15–9 (7–4) | Jerry Richardson Indoor Stadium (534); Spartanburg, SC |
| February 22, 2025; 6:00 pm, ESPN+ | | Mercer | W 65–64 | 16–9 (8–4) | Jerry Richardson Indoor Stadium (713); Spartanburg, SC |
| February 27, 2025; 7:00 pm, ESPN+ | | at East Tennessee State | L 57–63 | 16–10 (8–5) | Brooks Gymnasium (733); Johnson City, TN |
| March 1, 2025; 2:00 pm, ESPN+ | | at Chattanooga | L 61–69 | 16–11 (8–6) | McKenzie Arena (1,709); Chattanooga, TN |
SoCon tournament
| March 6, 2025; 5:45 pm, ESPN+ | (4) | vs. (5) Samford; Quarterfinals | W 58–56 | 17–11 | Harrah's Cherokee Center (2,581); Asheville, NC |
| March 7, 2025; 11:00 am, ESPN+ | (4) | vs. (1) UNC Greensboro; Semifinals | L 50–54 | 17–12 | Harrah's Cherokee Center; Asheville, NC |
*Non-conference game. ^{#}Rankings from AP Poll. (#) Tournament seedings in parentheses. All times are in Eastern.
