= 2024–25 UNC Greensboro Spartans women's basketball team =

American college basketball season

2024–25 UNC Greensboro Spartans women's basketball
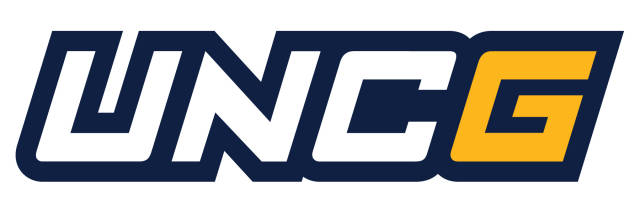

SoCon regular season & tournament champions

NCAA tournament, First Round
- Conference: Southern Conference
- Record: 25–7 (13–1 SoCon)
- Head coach: Trina Patterson (9th season)
- Associate head coach: Cetera DeGraffenreid
- Assistant coaches: Alex Miller; Fred Applin; Abby Vampatella; Letoya McBride

2024–25 Southern Conference women's basketball standings
	Conf.				Overall
Team	W		L	PCT	W		L	PCT
UNC Greensboro †	13	–	1	.929	25	–	7	.781
Chattanooga	9	–	5	.643	17	–	15	.531
East Tennessee State	8	–	6	.571	17	–	13	.567
Wofford	8	–	6	.571	17	–	12	.586
Samford	7	–	7	.500	12	–	19	.387
Furman	5	–	9	.357	16	–	16	.500
Mercer	3	–	11	.214	8	–	22	.267
Western Carolina	3	–	11	.214	13	–	17	.433
† 2025 SoCon tournament winner

The 2024–25 UNC Greensboro Spartans women's basketball team represented the University of North Carolina at Greensboro during the 2024–25 NCAA Division I women's basketball season. The Spartans, who were led by ninth-year head coach Trina Patterson, played their home games at Fleming Gymnasium in Greensboro, North Carolina, as members of the Southern Conference (SoCon).

== Previous season ==
The Spartans finished the 2023–24 season 21–12, 8–6 in SoCon play, to finish in a three-way tie for second place. As a No. 2 seed in the SoCon tournament, they defeated Furman in the quarterfinals and Wofford in the semifinals before losing to Chattanooga in the championship game. They received an automatic bid to the WNIT, where they lost in the first round to North Carolina A&T.

== Roster ==
2024–25 UNC Greensboro Spartans women's basketball team
Players
Coaches

Pos.	#	Name	Height	Year	Previous school	Hometown
G	0	Kelly Boyle	5 ft 6 in (1.68 m)	So	Hopkins High School	Maple Grove, MN
G	1	Jayde Gamble	5 ft 6 in (1.68 m)	Jr	UNC Wilmington	Holly Springs, NC
G	2	Tasia Johnson	5 ft 7 in (1.7 m)	Jr	Daytona State College	Greenwood, MO
G	3	Nasia Powell	5 ft 7 in (1.7 m)	Sr	Vanguard High School	Ocala, FL
G	4	Jaila Lee	5 ft 10 in (1.78 m)	Jr	UNC Asheville	Brentwood, TN
F	5	Yacine N'Diaye	6 ft 4 in (1.93 m)	So	Life Christian Academy	Pout, Senegal
F	6	Kristina Rakoto	5 ft 11 in (1.8 m)	Fr	Virginia Academy	Antananarivo, Madagascar
F	12	Ayanna Jackson	6 ft 1 in (1.85 m)	So	Sacramento State	Chicago, IL
G	13	Joelle Davis	5 ft 10 in (1.78 m)	So	Durham Academy	Durham, NC
G/F	14	Kennedy Simpson	6 ft 2 in (1.88 m)	Sr	Mallard Creek High School	Charlotte, NC
F	15	Khalis Cain	6 ft 3 in (1.91 m)	GS	Mount Zion Christian Academy	San Jose, CA
G	21	Makiah Asidanya	5 ft 7 in (1.7 m)	Fr	Salesian College Preparatory	Pittsburg, CA
G	22	Nya Smith	5 ft 9 in (1.75 m)	Fr	Milton High School	Roswell, GA
G	23	Jailah Clark-Jones	5 ft 11 in (1.8 m)	Sr	Collins Hill High School	Birmingham, AL
G	44	Nia Howard	5 ft 8 in (1.73 m)	Sr	Jordan High School	Durham, NC

Head coach

- Trina Patterson (Virginia)

Assistant coach(es)

- Cetera DeGraffenreid (North Carolina)
- Alex Miller (North Carolina)
- Fred Applin (Elon)
- Abby Vampatella (Gordon)
- Letoya McBride (Gardner–Webb)

Legend

- (C) Team captain
- (S) Suspended
- (I) Ineligible
- (W) Walk-on
- Injured
- Current redshirt

Roster
Last update: March 9, 2025

== Schedule and results ==
Date time, TV	Rank^{#}	Opponent^{#}	Result	Record	Site (attendance) city, state
Non-conference regular season
November 4, 2024*; 5:00 p.m., ESPN+		North Greenville	W 91–31	1–0	Fleming Gymnasium (158); Greensboro, NC
November 9, 2024*; 12:00 p.m., ESPN+		USC Upstate	W 62–54	2–0	Fleming Gymnasium (342); Greensboro, NC
November 13, 2024*; 12:00 p.m., ESPN+		at Coastal Carolina	L 62–69	2–1	HTC Center (858); Conway, SC
November 16, 2024*; 3:30 p.m., ESPN+		Appalachian State	W 68–55	3–1	Fleming Gymnasium (528); Greensboro, NC
November 19, 2024*; 11:00 a.m., ESPN+		UNC Asheville	W 59–48	4–1	Fleming Gymnasium (763); Greensboro, NC
November 22, 2024*; 7:00 p.m., ESPN+		Livingstone	W 79–41	5–1	Fleming Gymnasium (262); Greensboro, NC
November 24, 2024*; 2:00 p.m.		at South Carolina State	W 53–35	6–1	SHM Memorial Center; Orangeburg, SC
November 28, 2024*; 11:00 a.m.		vs. UTSA; Puerto Rico Clásico	L 53–62	6–2	Coliseo Rubén Rodríguez (100); San Juan, PR
November 29, 2024*; 11:00 a.m.		vs. La Moyne; Puerto Rico Clásico	W 83–61	7–2	Coliseo Rubén Rodríguez (100); San Juan, PR
December 11, 2024*; 7:00 p.m., ACCNX/ESPN+		at No. 14 North Carolina	L 56–80	7–3	Carmichael Arena (2,249); Chapel Hill, NC
December 16, 2024*; 11:00 a.m., SECN+/ESPN+		at Georgia	L 52–59	7–4	Stegeman Coliseum (4,524); Athens, GA
December 20, 2024*; 6:00 p.m., ACCNX/ESPN+		at Wake Forest	L 50–54	7–5	LJVM Coliseum (878); Winston-Salem, NC
December 31, 2024*; 2:00 p.m., ESPN+		Greensboro College	W 104–21	8–5	Fleming Gymnasium (197); Greensboro, NC
January 3, 2025*; 7:00 p.m., ESPN+		Carolina	W 86–51	9–5	Fleming Gymnasium (147); Greensboro, NC
SoCon regular season
January 9, 2025; 7:00 p.m., ESPN+		East Tennessee State	W 64–43	10–5 (1–0)	Fleming Gymnasium (228); Greensboro, NC
January 11, 2025; 2:00 p.m., ESPN+		Chattanooga	W 62–48	11–5 (2–0)	Fleming Gymnasium (171); Greensboro, NC
January 16, 2025; 7:00 p.m., ESPN+		at Wofford	L 39–62	11–6 (2–1)	Jerry Richardson Indoor Stadium (365); Spartansburg, SC
January 18, 2025; 2:00 p.m., ESPN+		at Furman	W 64–54	12–6 (3–1)	Bon Secours Wellness Arena (877); Greenville, SC
January 25, 2025; 2:00 p.m., ESPN+		at Western Carolina	W 66–58	13–6 (4–1)	Ramsey Center (421); Cullowhee, NC
January 30, 2025; 7:00 p.m., ESPN+		Mercer	W 70–37	14–6 (5–1)	Fleming Gymnasium (368); Greensboro, NC
February 1, 2025; 7:00 p.m., ESPN+		Samford	W 78–66	15–6 (6–1)	Fleming Gymnasium (414); Greensboro, NC
February 6, 2025; 6:00 p.m., ESPN+		at Chattanooga	W 58–50	16–6 (7–1)	McKenzie Arena (1,478); Chattanooga, TN
February 8, 2025; 1:30 p.m., ESPN+		at East Tennessee State	W 61–56 ^{OT}	17–6 (8–1)	Freedom Hall Civic Center (5,472); Johnson City, TN
February 13, 2025; 6:00 p.m., Nexstar/ESPN+		Furman	W 55–51	18–6 (9–1)	Fleming Gymnasium (322); Greensboro, NC
February 15, 2025; 2:00 p.m., ESPN+		Wofford	W 68–60	19–6 (10–1)	Fleming Gymnasium (322); Greensboro, NC
February 22, 2025; 2:00 p.m., ESPN+		Western Carolina	W 57–53	20–6 (11–1)	Fleming Gymnasium (651); Greensboro, NC
February 27, 2025; 7:00 p.m., ESPN+		at Samford	W 71–59	21–6 (12–1)	Pete Hanna Center (197); Homewood, AL
March 1, 2025; 2:00 p.m., ESPN+		at Mercer	W 76–37	22–6 (13–1)	Hawkins Arena (1,733); Macon, GA
SoCon tournament
March 6, 2025; 11:00 a.m., ESPN+	(1)	vs. (8) Western Carolina; Quarterfinals	W 50–43	23–6	Harrah's Cherokee Center; Asheville, NC
March 7, 2025; 11:00 a.m., Nexstar/ESPN+	(1)	vs. (4) Wofford; Semifinals	W 54–50	24–6	Harrah's Cherokee Center; Asheville, NC
March 9, 2025; 12:00 p.m., ESPNU	(1)	vs. (2) Chattanooga; Championship Game	W 64–57 ^{OT}	25–6	Harrah's Cherokee Center (1,259); Asheville, NC
NCAA tournament
March 22, 2025*; 3:00 p.m., ABC	(16 S4)	at (1 S4) No. 4 USC; First Round	L 25–72	25–7	Galen Center (6,865); Los Angeles, CA
*Non-conference game. ^{#}Rankings from AP poll. (#) Tournament seedings in parentheses. All times are in Eastern.
