= 2025 Southern Conference women's basketball tournament =

American college basketball tournament

- Classification: Division I
- Season: 2024–25
- Teams: 8
- Site: Harrah's Cherokee Center; Asheville, North Carolina
- Champions: UNC Greensboro (2nd title)
- MVP: Khalis Cain (UNC Greensboro)
- Television: Nexstar, ESPN+, ESPNU

2024–25 Southern Conference women's basketball standings
| | Conf. | | | | Overall |
| Team | W | | L | PCT | W | | L | PCT |
|---|---|---|---|---|---|---|---|---|
| UNC Greensboro † | 13 | – | 1 | .929 | 25 | – | 7 | .781 |
| Chattanooga | 9 | – | 5 | .643 | 17 | – | 15 | .531 |
| East Tennessee State | 8 | – | 6 | .571 | 17 | – | 13 | .567 |
| Wofford | 8 | – | 6 | .571 | 17 | – | 12 | .586 |
| Samford | 7 | – | 7 | .500 | 12 | – | 19 | .387 |
| Furman | 5 | – | 9 | .357 | 16 | – | 16 | .500 |
| Mercer | 3 | – | 11 | .214 | 8 | – | 22 | .267 |
| Western Carolina | 3 | – | 11 | .214 | 13 | – | 17 | .433 |
† 2025 SoCon tournament winner

The 2025 Southern Conference women's Basketball tournament took place March 6–9, 2025, at the Harrah's Cherokee Center in Asheville, North Carolina. UNC Greensboro earned the conference's automatic bid to the 2025 NCAA Division I women's basketball tournament.

== Seeds ==
Teams are seeded by record within the conference, with a tiebreaker system to seed teams with identical conference records.

| Seed | School | Conf | Overall | Tiebreaker(s) |
|---|---|---|---|---|
| #1 | UNC Greensboro | 13–1 | 22–6 | |
| #2 | Chattanooga | 9–5 | 14–13 | |
| #3 | East Tennessee State | 8–6 | 17–12 | 2–0 vs. Wofford |
| #4 | Wofford | 8–6 | 16–11 | 0–2 vs. East Tennessee State |
| #5 | Samford | 7–7 | 12–18 | |
| #6 | Furman | 5–9 | 14–15 | |
| #7 | Mercer | 3–11 | 9–21 | 2–0 vs. Western Carolina |
| #8 | Western Carolina | 3–11 | 13–16 | 0–2 vs. Mercer |

== Schedule ==
All tournament games are streamed on ESPN+. The championship will be televised across the region on select Nexstar stations and simulcast on ESPNU.

| Session | Game | Time | Matchup | Score | Television |
Quarterfinals – Thursday, March 6
| 1 | 1 | 11:00 AM | No. 1 UNC Greensboro vs. No. 8 Western Carolina | 50–43 | ESPN+ |
| 1 | 2 | 1:15 PM | No. 2 Chattanooga vs. No. 7 Mercer | 68–47 | ESPN+ |
| 2 | 3 | 3:30 PM | No. 3 East Tennessee State vs. No. 6 Furman | 58–64 | ESPN+ |
| 2 | 4 | 5:45 PM | No. 4 Wofford vs. No. 5 Samford | 58–56 | ESPN+ |
Semifinals – Friday, March 7
| 3 | 5 | 11:00 AM | No. 1 UNC Greensboro vs. No. 4 Wofford | 54–50 | ESPN+ |
| 3 | 6 | 1:15 PM | No. 2 Chattanooga vs. No. 6 Furman | 63–55 | ESPN+ |
Championship Game – Sunday, March 9
| 4 | 7 | Noon | No. 1 UNC Greensboro vs. No. 2 Chattanooga | 64–57^{OT} | ESPNU |
Game times in EST. Rankings denote tournament seeding.

== Bracket ==
- All times are Eastern.

Quarterfinals; Thursday, March 6 ESPN+
1 | UNC Greensboro | 50
8 | Western Carolina | 43
4 | Wofford | 58
5 | Samford | 56
2 | Chattanooga | 68
7 | Mercer | 47
3 | East Tennessee State | 58
6 | Furman | 64

Semifinals; Friday, March 7 ESPN+
1 | UNC Greensboro | 54
4 | Wofford | 50
2 | Chattanooga | 63
6 | Furman | 55

Championship Game; Sunday, March 9 ESPNU
1 | UNC Greensboro | 64*
2 | Chattanooga | 57

* denotes overtime period

== See also ==
- 2025 Southern Conference men's basketball tournament
