= Freddie Martino =

American football player (born 1991)

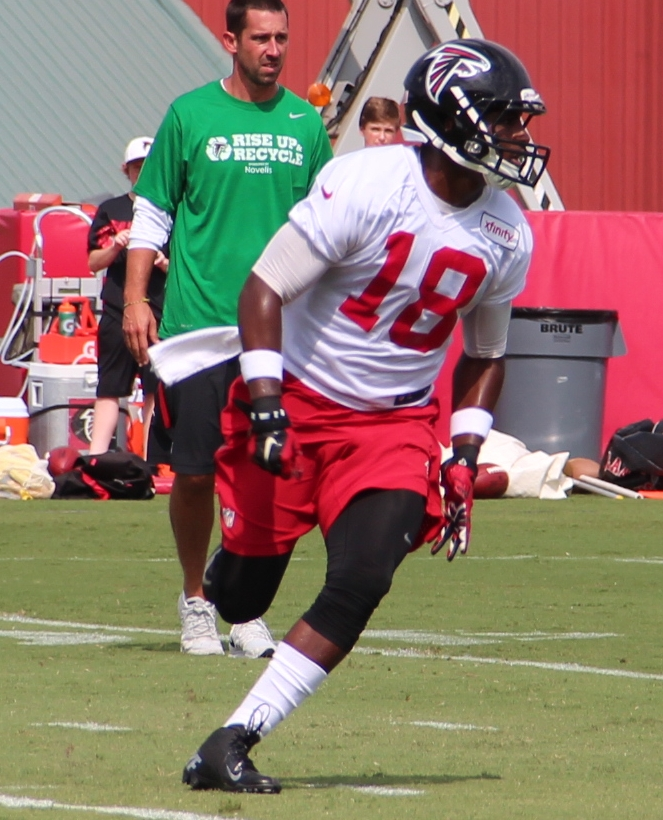
- Martino with the Atlanta Falcons in 2015

No. 16, 18
- Position: Wide receiver

Personal information
- Born: September 7, 1991 (age 35); North, South Carolina, U.S.
- Listed height: 6 ft 0 in (1.83 m)
- Listed weight: 195 lb (88 kg)

Career information
- High school: North
- College: North Greenville
- NFL draft: 2014: undrafted

Career history
- Atlanta Falcons (2014); Philadelphia Eagles (2015–2016)*; Tampa Bay Buccaneers (2016–2018); Orlando Apollos (2019)*; Arizona Hotshots (2019); Tampa Bay Vipers (2020)*; Dallas Renegades (2020)
- * Offseason or practice squad member only

Career NFL statistics
- Receptions: 13
- Receiving yards: 238
- Receiving touchdowns: 1
- Stats at Pro Football Reference

Freddie Martino Jr. (born September 7, 1991) is an American former professional football player who was a wide receiver for the Atlanta Falcons and Tampa Bay Buccaneers of the National Football League (NFL). He played college football for the North Greenville Crusaders. He was also a member of the Philadelphia Eagles, Orlando Apollos, Arizona Hotshots, Tampa Bay Vipers, and Dallas Renegades.

== Early life ==
Freddie Martino Jr. was born on September 7, 1991, in North, South Carolina. He attended North High School in North, South Carolina.

== College career ==
Martino played for the North Greenville Crusaders of North Greenville University from 2010 to 2013. He recorded 296 receptions for 3,766 yards and 26 touchdowns while scoring 5 rushing touchdowns in 48 career games. He was also named the Conference Carolinas Track Athlete of the Year for the 2013 indoor season. His track coach was Michael Bayne.

== Professional career ==
Pre-draft measurables
Height	Weight	40-yard dash	10-yard split	20-yard split	20-yard shuttle	Three-cone drill	Vertical jump	Broad jump	Bench press
6 ft 0 in (1.83 m)	198 lb (90 kg)	4.49 s	1.60 s	2.65 s	4.36 s	6.59 s	33 1/2 in (0.85 m)	9 ft 7 in (2.92 m)	13 reps
All values from North Greenville Pro Day

=== Atlanta Falcons ===
Martino was signed by the Atlanta Falcons on May 13, 2014, after going undrafted in the 2014 NFL draft. He was released by the Falcons on August 29, and was re–signed to the team's practice squad on September 1. Martino made his NFL debut on October 19, against the Baltimore Ravens. Martino was released by the Falcons on November 21. He was re-signed to the Falcons' practice squad on November 25.

Martino was released by the Falcons on August 7, 2015.

=== Philadelphia Eagles ===
Martino signed with the Philadelphia Eagles on August 10, 2015. He was released by the Eagles on September 5 and subsequently re–signed to the team's practice squad on September 6.

Martino was released by the team on May 2, 2016.

=== Tampa Bay Buccaneers ===
Martino was signed by the Tampa Bay Buccaneers on May 11, 2016. On September 3, he was released by the Buccaneers as a part of final roster cuts. The next day, Martino was re–signed to the Buccaneers' practice squad. On September 21, he was promoted to the active roster. Martino was released again on October 3. He was re-signed to the practice squad on October 17. Martino was promoted back to the active roster on October 22. He recorded his first career touchdown reception against the Chicago Bears on November 13.

On February 27, 2017, Martino signed a one-year contract tender with the Buccaneers. He was waived on September 2, and was re–signed to the Buccaneers' practice squad the following day. Martino was promoted to the active roster on November 8. He was waived again on November 13, and was re-signed to the practice squad. Martino was promoted back to the active roster on November 17.

On September 27, 2018, Martino was released by the Buccaneers. He was re-signed on October 13, but was released three days later.

=== Alliance of American Football ===
Before the 2019 season, Martino joined the Orlando Apollos of the Alliance of American Football. On January 14, 2019, he was traded to the Arizona Hotshots in exchange for Donald Hawkins. The league ceased operations in April 2019.

=== XFL ===
In October 2019, Martino was selected by the Tampa Bay Vipers of the XFL in the open phase of the 2020 XFL draft.

Martino was traded to the Dallas Renegades in exchange for wide receiver Stacy Coley on January 12, 2020. Martino was placed on injured reserve on March 9. He had his contract terminated when the league suspended operations on April 10.
