= Tigerville, South Carolina =

- Census-designated place
- Location within South Carolina Location within the United States
- Coordinates: 35°04′00″N 82°22′23″W
- Country: United States
- State: South Carolina
- County: Greenville

Area
  - Total: 1.34 sq mi (3.48 km^{2})
  - Land: 1.33 sq mi (3.44 km^{2})
  - Water: 0.015 sq mi (0.04 km^{2})
- Elevation: 988 ft (301 m)

Population (2020)
  - Total: 1,244
  - Density: 936.4/sq mi (361.53/km^{2})
- Time zone: UTC-5 (Eastern (EST))
  - Summer (DST): UTC-4 (EDT)
- ZIP Code: 29688
- FIPS code: 45-71890
- GNIS feature ID: 2629837

Tigerville is an unincorporated community and census-designated place in Greenville County, South Carolina, United States. As of the 2010 United States census the population was 1,312. It lies 12 miles (19 km) north of Taylors, 10 miles (16 km) northeast of Travelers Rest, and 14 miles (23 km) northwest of Greer. North Greenville University, a private institution of higher education affiliated with the Southern Baptist Convention, is located in Tigerville. The community is part of the Greenville-Mauldin-Easley metropolitan area.

Poinsett Bridge was listed on the National Register of Historic Places in 1970.

== Demographics ==
Historical population
Census	Pop.	Note	%±
2010	1,312		—
2020	1,244		−5.2%
U.S. Decennial Census

=== 2020 census ===
Tigerville racial composition
Race	Num.	Perc.
White (non-Hispanic)	1,009	81.11%
Black or African American (non-Hispanic)	95	7.64%
Native American	3	0.24%
Asian	7	0.56%
Pacific Islander	1	0.08%
Other/Mixed	43	3.46%
Hispanic or Latino	86	6.91%

As of the 2020 United States census, there were 1,244 people, 27 households, and 19 families residing in the CDP.
