= North Greenville University =

Baptist university in Tigerville, South Carolina, US

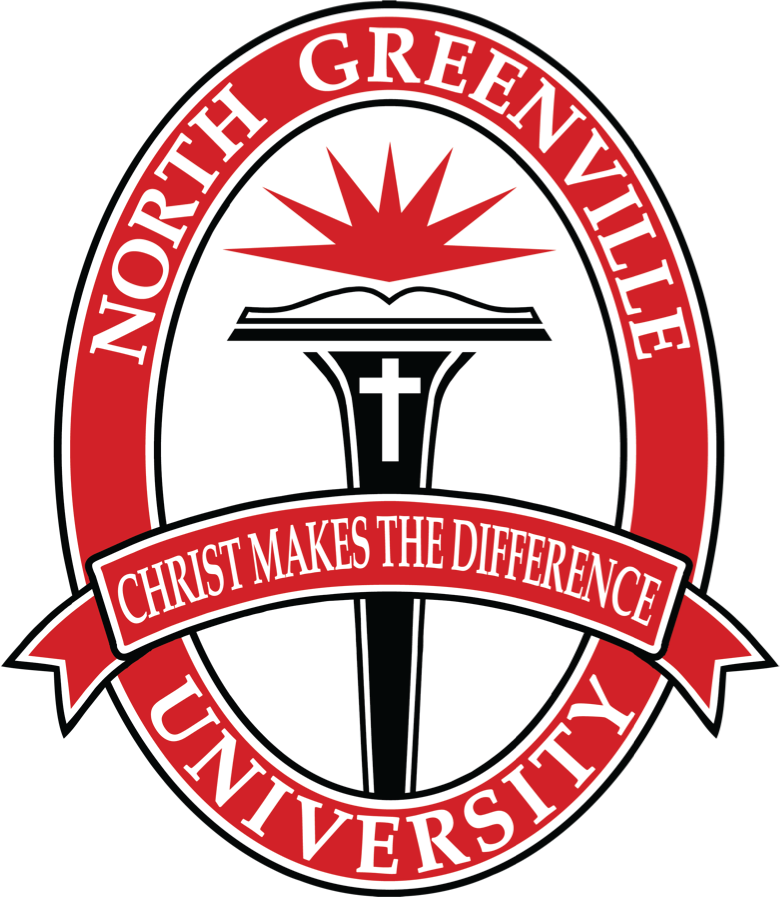
- Former names: North Greenville High School (1892–1915); North Greenville Baptist Academy (1915–1950); North Greenville Junior College (1950–1972); North Greenville College (1972–2006)
- Motto: Christ Makes the Difference
- Type: Private college
- Established: October 14, 1891; 135 years ago
- Religious affiliation: South Carolina Baptist Convention (Southern Baptist Convention)
- President: Gene Fant Jr.
- Provost: Jan Foster
- Students: 2,125
- Undergraduates: 1,839
- Postgraduates: 286
- Location: Tigerville, South Carolina, United States; 35°4′9″N 82°22′20″W
- Campus: Rural
- Colors: Red, Black & White
- Nickname: Trailblazers
- Sporting affiliations: NCAA Division II – Carolinas
- Website: ngu.edu

North Greenville University is a private Baptist university in Tigerville, South Carolina. It is accredited by the Southern Association of Colleges and Schools and awards bachelor's, master's, and doctoral degrees online and in-person.

== History ==
NGU's history dates to 1892 when it was initially named North Greenville High School, the first high school in the northern portion of Greenville County. Benjamin F. Neves donated land for the school which the North Greenville Baptist Association operated. It was established to expand educational offerings in the mountainous northern portion of Greenville County.

The school received a state charter in 1904. It was taken over by the Southern Baptist Convention's Home Mission Board a year later. It was renamed North Greenville Baptist Academy in 1915. The North Greenville Baptist Association reassumed control of the school in 1929.

In 1934, the academy was expanded to include a junior college. In 1949, it was transferred to the South Carolina Baptist Convention, which renamed the school North Greenville Junior College the following year. In 1957, it was accredited as a two-year college, and high school courses were dropped altogether. It was renamed simply North Greenville College in 1972.

NGC began offering its first junior- and senior-level classes in 1992 in Christian studies and church music, and added a teacher education program in 1997. In the following years, various other bachelor's degree programs were added, including English, History, Spanish, Psychology, Business, Criminal Justice, Theatre, Communications, Interdisciplinary Studies, Biology, and Mathematics, among other subjects. The institution's name changed to North Greenville University in 2006, and it began granting master's degrees as well.

The institution was granted an exception to Title IX in 2015, which allows it to discriminate against LGBTQ students legally. Homosexual acts and all sex outside of marriage are grounds for expulsion from the school.

== Academics ==
In 2024, the institution was ranked 36th in U.S. News & World Report's "Best Regional Universities" in the South. It is affiliated with the South Carolina Baptist Convention (Southern Baptist Convention).

== Athletics ==
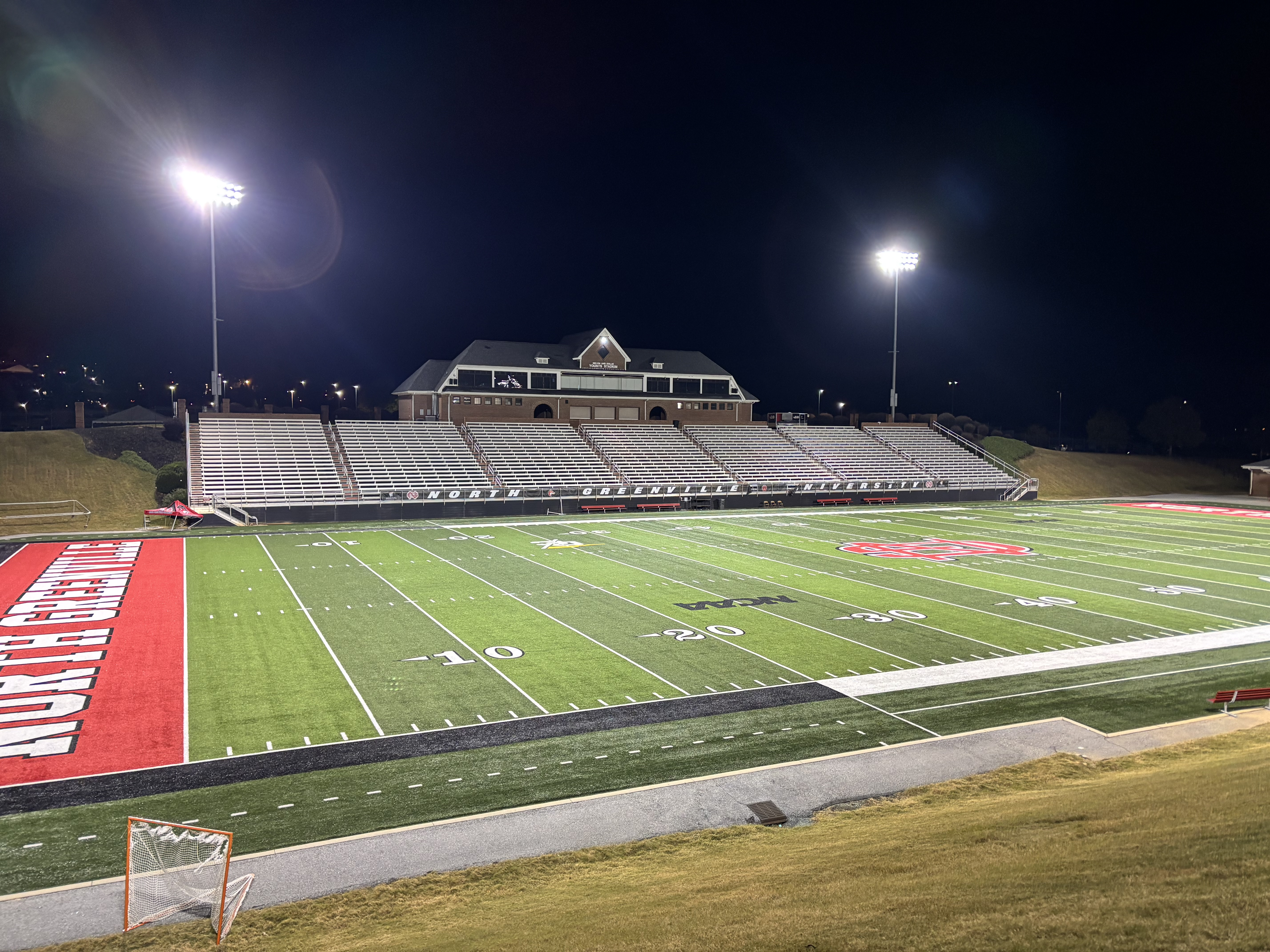
Younts Stadium

The North Greenville (NGU) athletic teams are called the Trailblazers— they were previously known as the Crusaders until 2024. The institution is a member of the NCAA Division II ranks, primarily competing in the Conference Carolinas (CC; formerly known as the Carolinas–Virginia Athletic Conference (CVAC) until after the 2006–07 school year) since the 2011–12 academic year.

They were also a member of the National Christian College Athletic Association (NCCAA), primarily competing as an independent in the South Region of the Division I level. The Trailblazers previously competed as a member of the Mid-South Conference (MSC) of the National Association of Intercollegiate Athletics (NAIA) from 1995–96 to 2000–01.

NGU competes in 21 intercollegiate varsity sports: Men's sports include baseball, basketball, cross-country, football, golf, lacrosse, soccer, tennis, track & field, and volleyball, while women's sports include basketball, cross country, golf, lacrosse, soccer, softball, tennis, track & field, women's flag football and volleyball; and co-ed sports include cheerleading.

=== Baseball ===
The baseball team won the national NCAA Division II baseball tournament in 2022.

== Notable alumni ==
- Mac Brunson, pastor
- Seth Condrey, musician
- Donna Scott Davenport, judge
- Steven Furtick, pastor
- Clayton Holmes, professional football player
- Josh Kimbrell, politician
- Freddie Martino, professional football player
- John Michael McConnell, US Director of National Intelligence
- Bob Richey, college basketball coach
- Chris Sligh, songwriter and musician
