= 2025–26 Tennessee Tech Golden Eagles women's basketball team =

American college basketball season

2025–26 Tennessee Tech Golden Eagles women's basketball
- Conference: Ohio Valley Conference
- Record: 15–14 (8–12 OVC)
- Head coach: Kim Rosamond (10th season)
- Associate head coach: Melanie Walls
- Assistant coaches: Allison Clark; Jasmine Cincore; Kate Sherwood
- Home arena: Hooper Eblen Center

2025–26 Ohio Valley Conference women's basketball standings
	Conf.				Overall
Team	W		L	PCT	W		L	PCT
Western Illinois †	16	–	4	.800	26	–	6	.813
Lindenwood	16	–	4	.800	25	–	8	.758
Southern Indiana	14	–	6	.700	21	–	10	.677
Morehead State	13	–	7	.650	18	–	15	.545
Little Rock	11	–	9	.550	15	–	15	.500
UT Martin	9	–	11	.450	13	–	17	.433
SIU Edwardsville	8	–	12	.400	16	–	16	.500
Southeast Missouri State	8	–	12	.400	14	–	18	.438
Tennessee Tech	8	–	12	.400	15	–	14	.517
Tennessee State	4	–	16	.200	5	–	24	.172
Eastern Illinois	3	–	17	.150	4	–	27	.129
† 2026 OVC tournament winner

The 2025-26 Tennessee Tech Golden Eagles women's basketball team represents Tennessee Technological University during the 2025-26 NCAA Division I women's basketball season. The Golden Eagles, are led by tenth-year head coach Kim Rosamond, and play their home games at the Hooper Eblen Center in Cookeville, Tennessee as members of the Ohio Valley Conference (OVC).

== Previous season ==
The Golden Eagles finished 2024-25 season 26–6, 18–2 in OVC play, to finish in first place. As the No. 1 seed in the OVC tournament, they defeated Southern Indiana in the semifinals en route to beating Lindenwood in the championship game. NCAA tournament, they were eliminated in the first round by South Carolina.

== Roster ==
2025–26 Tennessee Tech Golden Eagles women's basketball team
Players
Coaches

Pos.	#	Name	Height	Year	Previous school	Hometown
G	1	Lyriq Mastin	5 ft 6 in (1.68 m)	Fr	Blackman HS	Murfreesboro, TN
G	2	Cam Mathews	5 ft 7 in (1.7 m)	Sr	Keller HS; Tulsa	Keller, TX
G	3	Amaya Thomas	5 ft 8 in (1.73 m)	Jr	Ezell-Harding Christian School; Trevecca Nazarene	Nashville, TN
F	4	LaReesha Cawthorn	6 ft 0 in (1.83 m)	Fr	Franklin-Simpson HS	Franklin, KY
C	5	Amanda Pfeiffer	6 ft 2 in (1.88 m)	So	Alcoa HS	Alcoa, TN
G	10	Reagan Hurst	5 ft 10 in (1.78 m)	GS	Upperman HS	Baxter, TN
G	21	Chloe Larry	5 ft 8 in (1.73 m)	So	Parkway HS	Bossier City, LA
F	23	Amaya Redd	5 ft 10 in (1.78 m)	Fr	Knoxville Catholic HS	Knoxville, TN
F/C	30	Maddy Newman	6 ft 1 in (1.85 m)	So	Gatlinburg-Pittman HS	Gatlinburg, TN
F	32	Sofi Miller	6 ft 2 in (1.88 m)	Fr	The First Academy	Orlando, FL
G	33	Reghan Grimes	5 ft 10 in (1.78 m)	Sr	Ravenwood HS	Nashville, TN
G	44	Angelika Girgenson	5 ft 7 in (1.7 m)	So	Orange Lions Academy	Zwolle, Netherlands

Head coach

- Kim Rosamond (Mississippi)

Assistant coach(es)

- Melanie Walls (Georgia College)
- Allison Clark (Tennessee Tech)
- Jasmine Cincore (Nebraska)
- Kate Sherwood (Wright State)

Legend

- (C) Team captain
- (S) Suspended
- (I) Ineligible
- (W) Walk-on
- Injured
- Current redshirt

Roster
Last update: December 2, 2025

== Schedule and results ==
Date time, TV	Rank^{#}	Opponent^{#}	Result	Record	Site (attendance) city, state			
Exhibition
October 29, 2025*; 6:00 p.m.		Tennessee Wesleyan	W 127-52		22 – Grimes	11 – Cawthorm	4 – Larry	Hooper Eblen Center (641); Cookeville, TN
Non-conference regular season
November 3, 2025*; 6:00 p.m., ESPN+		Cumberlands	W 92-67	1–0	24 – Grimes	9 – Cawthorn	3 – Grimes	Hooper Eblen Center (656); Cookeville, TN
November 7, 2025*; 6:00 p.m., SWAC TV		at Jackson State	W 59-53	2–0	16 – Mathews	13 – Cawthorn	5 – Mathews	Williams Assembly Center (412); Jackson, MS
November 11, 2025*; 6:00 p.m., ESPN+		Middle Tennessee	W 63-54	3–0	21 – Cawthorn	8 – Cawthorn	4 – Hurst	Hooper Eblen Center (1,126); Cookeville, TN
November 15, 2025*; 1:00 p.m., ESPN+		at Kennesaw State	L 60-61	3-1	16 – Grimes	9 – Cawthorn	3 – Mathews	VyStar Arena (515); Kennesaw, GA
November 20, 2025*; 6:00 p.m., ESPN+		East Tennessee State	W 61-52	4–1	10 – Tied	7 – Mathews	3 – Grimes	Hooper Eblen Center (735); Cookeville, TN
November 25, 2025*; 9:00 p.m., B1G+		at USC	L 44-85	4-2	12 – Tied	9 – Cawthorn	4 – Grimes	Galen Center (3,012); Los Angeles, CA
December 1, 2025*; 6:00 p.m., ESPN+		Lipscomb	W 68-55	5-2	18 – Hurst	7 – Newman	5 – Tied	Hooper Eblen Center (597); Cookeville, TN
December 4, 2025*; 11:00 a.m., ESPN+		Samford	W 82-60	6-2	21 – Grimes	15 – Cawthorn	4 – Mathews	Hooper Eblen Center (5,897); Cookeville, TN
December 13, 2025*; 1:00 p.m., ESPN+		Stephens College	W 92-53	7-2	22 – Grimes	10 – Grimes	4 – Tied	Hooper Eblen Center; Cookeville, TN
December 13, 2025*; 1:00 p.m., ESPN+		Stephens College	W 92-53	7-2	22 – Grimes	10 – Grimes	4 – Tied	Hooper Eblen Center; Cookeville, TN
Ohio Valley regular season
December 18, 2025*; 5:30 p.m., ESPN+		Southeast Missouri State	W 79-66	8-2 (1-0)	34 – Mathews	16 – Cawthorn	4 – Tied	Hooper Eblen Center (574); Cookeville, TN
December 20, 2025*; 1:00 p.m., ESPN+		UT Martin	W 74-62	9-2 (2-0)	19 – Tied	14 – Cawthorn	5 – Grimes	Hooper Eblen Center (574); Cookeville, TN
December 30, 2025*; 5:30 p.m., ESPN+		Tennessee State	W 69-63	10-2 (3-0)	14 – Hurst	8 – Grimes	4 – Larry	Hooper Eblen Center (1,012); Cookeville, TN
January 1, 2026; 3:00 p.m., ESPN+		at Little Rock	L 44-51	10-3 (3-1)	16 – Hurst	7 – Cawthorn	1 – Tied	Jack Stephens Center; Little Rock, AR
January 8, 2026; 5:00 p.m., ESPN+		at Eastern Illinois	L 74-75	10-4 (3-2)	29 – Grimes	9 – Pfeiffer	4 – Larry	Groniger Arena (360); Charleston, IL
January 10, 2026; 1:00 p.m., ESPN+		at Western Illinois	L 60-77	10-5 (3-3)	16 – Larry	8 – Cawthorn	4 – Hurst	Western Hall (987); Macomb, IL
January 15, 2026*; 5:30 p.m., ESPN+		Southern Indiana	L 69-71	10-6 (3-4)	23 – Larry	16 – Cawthorn	3 – Tied	Hooper Eblen Center (833); Cookeville, TN
January 17, 2026*; 1:00 p.m., ESPN+		Morehead State	L 66-67	10-7 (3-5)	18 – Larry	11 – Grimes	6 – Tied	Hooper Eblen Center (887); Cookeville, TN
January 22, 2026; 5:00 p.m., ESPN+		at Lindenwood	L 55-66	10-8 (3-6)	17 – Hurst	14 – Cawthorn	5 – Larry	Robert F. Hyland Performance Arena (654); St. Charles, MO
January 24, 2026; 11:00 a.m., ESPN+		at SIU Edwardsville	L 62-67	10-9 (3-7)	17 – Hurst	8 – Cawthorn	3 – Hurst	Vadalabene Center (1,525); Edwardsville, IL
January 31, 2026*; 1:00 p.m., ESPN+		Little Rock	W 72-47	11-9 (4-7)	17 – Larry	10 – Tied	5 – Larry	Hooper Eblen Center (817); Cookeville, TN
February 2, 2026; 5:00 p.m., ESPN+		at Tennessee State	W 68-49	12-9 (5-7)	28 – Larry	6 – Cawthorn	5 – Grimes	Gentry Complex (276); Nashville, TN
February 5, 2026*; 5:30 p.m., ESPN+		Western Illinois	L 53-68	12-10 (5-8)	17 – Larry	14 – Cawthorn	3 – Larry	Hooper Eblen Center (910); Cookeville, TN
February 7, 2026*; 1:00 p.m., ESPN+		Eastern Illinois	W 75-70	13-10 (6-8)	27 – Cawthorn	27 – Cawthorn	3 – Grimes	Hooper Eblen Center (905); Cookeville, TN
February 12, 2026; 4:00 p.m., ESPN+		at Morehead State	W 61-58	14-10 (7-8)	21 – Hurst	12 – Grimes	4 – Tied	Ellis Johnson Arena (1,028); Morehead, KY
February 14, 2026; 1:00 p.m., ESPN+		at Southern Indiana	L 60-72	14-11 (7-9)	13 – Tied	8 – Larry	4 – Larry	Screaming Eagles Arena (1,469); Evansville, IN
February 19, 2026*; 5:30 p.m., ESPN+		SIU Edwardsville	L 60-76	14-12 (7-10)	19 – Cawthorn	7 – Cawthorn	4 – Hurst	Hooper Eblen Center (945); Cookeville, TN
February 21, 2026*; 1:00 p.m., ESPN+		Lindenwood	L 57-70	14-13 (7-11)	15 – Larry	10 – Cawthorn	4 – Redd	Hooper Eblen Center (986); Cookeville, TN
February 26, 2026; 5:30 p.m., ESPN+		at UT Martin	W 80-68	15-13 (8-11)	17 – Hurst	15 – Cawthorn	6 – Mastin	Skyhawk Arena (1,174); Martin, TN
February 28, 2026; 1:30 p.m., ESPN+		at Southeast Missouri State	L 61-83	15-14 (8-12)	13 – Grimes	10 – Cawthorn	3 – Tied	Show Me Center (889); Cape Girardeau, MO
*Non-conference game. ^{#}Rankings from AP poll. (#) Tournament seedings in parentheses. All times are in Central.
