= Ohio Valley Conference women's basketball tournament =

- Conference basketball championship
- Sport: Basketball
- Conference: Ohio Valley Conference
- Number of teams: 8
- Format: Single-elimination tournament
- Played: 1981–present
- Last contest: 2026
- Current champion: Western Illinois (1st)
- Most championships: Tennessee Tech (11)
- Official website: Ohio Valley Conference Basketball

The Ohio Valley Conference women's basketball tournament is the conference championship tournament in women's basketball for the Ohio Valley Conference. It is a single-elimination tournament involving 8 of the 11 league schools, and seeding is based on regular-season records with head-to-head matchup as a tiebreaker. The winner normally receives the conference's automatic bid to the NCAA women's basketball tournament. An exception was in 2024, when Southern Indiana swept the conference's regular-season and tournament titles but was not eligible for the NCAA tournament because of its ongoing transition from NCAA Division II. The highest seeds face off against the corresponding lowest seeds, with the two remaining teams facing off in the Finals to determine the champion. The tournament has been held since 1981.

== History ==
For the 1978-79 season, a tournament was held to determine the champion of the conference, though it was not a postseason tournament due to it being held from February 8 to February 10, with the season running until March 9. Morehead State won the tournament. In 1982, the first formal tournament was held for the conference. Southeast Missouri vacated the 2005-06 title due to NCAA penalties. Tennessee Tech has won 10 titles, Austin Peay (which left the conference in July 2022) has won 7, and Belmont (which also left in 2022) and Middle Tennessee (formerly of the conference) have won 6 each.

== Results ==
Season	Tournament champion	Score	Tournament runner-up	Venue
1982	Tennessee Tech	80–66	Morehead State	Cookeville, TN (Eblen Center)
1983	Middle Tennessee State	74–61	Morehead State	Cookeville, TN (Eblen Center)
1984	Middle Tennessee State (2)	71–61	Tennessee Tech	Murfreesboro, TN (Murphy Center)
1985	Middle Tennessee State (3)	67–61	Tennessee Tech	Murfreesboro, TN (Murphy Center)
1986	Middle Tennessee State (4)	66–63	Tennessee Tech	Murfreesboro, TN (Murphy Center)
1987	Tennessee Tech (2)	71–67	Middle Tennessee State	Murfreesboro, TN (Murphy Center)
1988	Middle Tennessee State (5)	79–62	Tennessee Tech	Murfreesboro, TN (Murphy Center)
1989	Tennessee Tech (3)	80–79	Murray State	Murfreesboro, TN (Murphy Center)
1990	Tennessee Tech (4)	79–72	Murray State	Cookeville, TN (Eblen Center)
1991	Tennessee Tech (5)	84–59	Middle Tennessee State	Cookeville, TN (Eblen Center)
1992	Tennessee Tech (6)	81–74	Eastern Kentucky	Cookeville, TN (Eblen Center)
1993	Tennessee Tech (7)	80–73	Middle Tennessee State	Cookeville, TN (Eblen Center)
1994	Tennessee State	71–63	Tennessee Tech	Cookeville, TN (Eblen Center)
1995	Tennessee State (2)	66–63	Tennessee Tech	Nashville, TN (Nashville Municipal Auditorium)
1996	Austin Peay	69–60	Middle Tennessee State	Nashville, TN (Nashville Municipal Auditorium)
1997	Eastern Kentucky	69–65	Tennessee Tech	Nashville, TN (Nashville Municipal Auditorium)
1998	Middle Tennessee State (6)	59–58	UT Martin	Nashville, TN (Nashville Arena)
1999	Tennessee Tech (8)	86–83	UT Martin	Nashville, TN (Nashville Arena)
2000	Tennessee Tech (9)	89–80	Austin Peay	Nashville, TN (Gaylord Entertainment Center)
2001	Austin Peay (2)	65–63	Tennessee Tech	Nashville, TN (Gaylord Entertainment Center)
2002	Austin Peay (3)	85–83	Tennessee Tech	Louisville, KY (Kentucky International Convention Center)
2003	Austin Peay (4)	85–61	Southeast Missouri State	Nashville, TN (Gaylord Entertainment Center)
2004	Austin Peay (5)	65–51	Eastern Kentucky	Nashville, TN (Nashville Municipal Auditorium)
2005	Eastern Kentucky (2)	84–73 (2OT)	Southeast Missouri State	Nashville, TN (Gaylord Entertainment Center)
2006	Southeast Missouri State †	71–50	Tennessee Tech	Nashville, TN (Gaylord Entertainment Center)
2007	Southeast Missouri State	62–60	Murray State	Nashville, TN (Gaylord Entertainment Center)
2008	Murray State	69–58	Eastern Illinois	Nashville, TN (Nashville Municipal Auditorium)
2009	Austin Peay (6)	69–65 (2OT)	Eastern Illinois	Nashville, TN (Sommet Center)
2010	Austin Peay (7)	69–60	Eastern Illinois	Nashville, TN (Bridgestone Arena)
2011	UT Martin	82–76	Tennessee Tech	Nashville, TN (Nashville Municipal Auditorium)
2012	UT Martin (2)	82–65	Tennessee Tech	Nashville, TN (Nashville Municipal Auditorium)
2013	UT Martin (3)	87–80 (OT)	Tennessee Tech	Nashville, TN (Nashville Municipal Auditorium)
2014	UT Martin (4)	78–66	Belmont	Nashville, TN (Nashville Municipal Auditorium)
2015	Tennessee State (3)	64–60	UT Martin	Nashville, TN (Nashville Municipal Auditorium)
2016	Belmont	95–63	Eastern Kentucky	Nashville, TN (Nashville Municipal Auditorium)
2017	Belmont (2)	94–64	Eastern Kentucky	Nashville, TN (Nashville Municipal Auditorium)
2018	Belmont (3)	63–56	UT Martin	Evansville, IN (Ford Center)
2019	Belmont (4)	59–53	UT Martin	Evansville, IN (Ford Center)
2020	Southeast Missouri State (2)	67–47	UT Martin	Evansville, IN (Ford Center)
2021	Belmont (5)	83–75	UT Martin	Evansville, IN (Ford Center)
2022	Belmont (6)	51–29	Tennessee Tech	Evansville, IN (Ford Center)
2023	Tennessee Tech (10)	54–46	Little Rock	Evansville, IN (Ford Center)
2024	Southern Indiana	83–51	UT Martin	Evansville, IN (Ford Center)
2025	Tennessee Tech (11)	82-76 (OT)	Lindenwood	Evansville, IN (Ford Center)
2026	Western Illinois (1)	71–65	Lindenwood	Evansville, IN (Ford Center)

== List of championships by school ==
School	Championships	Championship Years
Tennessee Tech	11	1982, 1987, 1989, 1990, 1991, 1992, 1993, 1999, 2000, 2023, 2025
Austin Peay	7	1996, 2001, 2002, 2003, 2004, 2009, 2010
Belmont	6	2016, 2017, 2018, 2019, 2021, 2022
Middle Tennessee	6	1983, 1984, 1985, 1986, 1988, 1998
UT Martin	4	2011, 2012, 2013, 2014
Tennessee State	3	1994, 1995, 2015
Eastern Kentucky	2	1997, 2005
Southeast Missouri State	2	2006†, 2007, 2020
Western Illinois	1	2026
Southern Indiana	1	2024
Murray State	1	2008
Morehead State	1	1979
Eastern Illinois	0	
Jacksonville State	0	
Lindenwood	0	
Little Rock	0	
SIU Edwardsville	0	

- Schools highlighted in pink are former members of the Ohio Valley Conference

== See also ==
- Ohio Valley Conference men's basketball tournament
