= 2026 Ohio Valley Conference women's basketball tournament =

- Classification: Division I
- Season: 2025–26
- Teams: 8
- Site: Ford Center; Evansville, Indiana
- Champions: Western Illinois (1st title)
- Winning coach: JD Gravina (1st title)
- Television: ESPN+

2025–26 Ohio Valley Conference women's basketball standings
	Conf.				Overall
Team	W		L	PCT	W		L	PCT
Western Illinois †	16	–	4	.800	26	–	6	.813
Lindenwood	16	–	4	.800	25	–	8	.758
Southern Indiana	14	–	6	.700	21	–	10	.677
Morehead State	13	–	7	.650	18	–	15	.545
Little Rock	11	–	9	.550	15	–	15	.500
UT Martin	9	–	11	.450	13	–	17	.433
SIU Edwardsville	8	–	12	.400	16	–	16	.500
Southeast Missouri State	8	–	12	.400	14	–	18	.438
Tennessee Tech	8	–	12	.400	15	–	14	.517
Tennessee State	4	–	16	.200	5	–	24	.172
Eastern Illinois	3	–	17	.150	4	–	27	.129
† 2026 OVC tournament winner

The 2026 Ohio Valley Conference Women's Basketball Tournament was the final event of the 2025–26 NCAA Division I women's basketball season in the Ohio Valley Conference. The tournament was held March 4–7, 2026, at the Ford Center in Evansville, Indiana. The tournament winner received the conference's automatic bid to the 2026 NCAA Division I women's basketball tournament.

== Seeds ==
Only the top eight teams in the conference qualified for the tournament. Teams were seeded by record within the conference, with a tiebreaker system to seed teams with identical conference records.

Seed	School	Conference Record	Tiebreaker
1	Western Illinois	16–4	1–1 vs. Morehead State
2	Lindenwood	16–4	0–1 vs. Morehead State
3	Southern Indiana	14–6	
4	Morehead State	13–7	
5	Little Rock	11–9	
6	UT Martin	9–11	
7	SIU Edwardsville	8–12	3–1 vs. Southeast Missouri State/Tennessee Tech
8	Southeast Missouri State	8–12	2–1 vs. SIU Edwardsville/Tennessee Tech
DNQ	Tennessee Tech	8–12	0–3 vs. SIU Edwardsville/Southeast Missouri State
DNQ	Tennessee State	4–16	
DNQ	Eastern Illinois	3–17	

== Schedule ==
Game	Time	Matchup	Score	Attendance	Television
First Round – Wednesday, March 4
1	12:30 p.m.	No. 5 Little Rock vs. No. 8 Southeast Missouri State	65–68	728	ESPN+
2	3:15 p.m.	No. 6 UT Martin vs. No. 7 SIU Edwardsville	49–63	728	ESPN+
Quarterfinals – Thursday, March 5
3	12:30 p.m.	No. 4 Morehead State vs. No. 8 Southeast Missouri State	55–60	1,202	ESPN+
4	3:00 p.m.	No. 3 Southern Indiana vs. No. 7 SIU Edwardsville	72–44	1,202	ESPN+
Semifinals – Friday, March 6
5	1:00 p.m.	No. 1 Western Illinois vs. No. 8 Southeast Missouri State	74–66	1,266	ESPN+
6	3:30 p.m.	No. 2 Lindenwood vs. No. 3 Southern Indiana	82–79	1,266	ESPN+
Final – Saturday, March 7
7	3:00 p.m.	No. 1 Western Illinois vs. No. 2 Lindenwood	71–65	922	ESPN+
All game times in Central Time Zone; ranking denotes tournament seed.

== Bracket ==
First Round; Wednesday, March 4 ESPN+
5	Little Rock	65
8	Southeast Missouri State	68
6	UT Martin	49
7	SIU Edwardsville	63

Quarterfinals; Thursday, March 5 ESPN+
4	Morehead State	55
8	Southeast Missouri State	60
3	Southern Indiana	72
7	SIU Edwardsville	44

Semifinals; Friday, March 6 ESPN+
1	Western Illinois	74
8	Southeast Missouri State	66
2	Lindenwood	82
3	Southern Indiana	79

Final; Saturday, March 7 ESPN+
1	Western Illinois	71
2	Lindenwood	65
