= 2025–26 NCAA Division I women's basketball season =

American collegiate basketball season

- Preseason AP No. 1: UConn Huskies
- Regular season: November 3, 2025 – March 15, 2026
- NCAA Tournament: 2026
- Tournament dates: March 18 – April 5, 2026
- National Championship: Mortgage Matchup Center; Phoenix, Arizona
- NCAA Champions: UCLA Bruins
- Other champions: Columbia Lions (WBIT); Marshall Thundering Herd (WNIT)

The 2025–26 NCAA Division I women's basketball season began on November 3, 2025. The regular season ended on March 15, 2026. The 2026 NCAA Division I women's basketball tournament began with the first four on March 18 and ended with the championship game on April 5, at Mortgage Matchup Center in Phoenix, Arizona.

== Season headlines ==
- May 6 – New Haven announced that it had accepted an invite to join the Northeast Conference effective July 1, 2025, and begin reclassification from NCAA Division II to be eligible for postseason play in 2028–29.
- June 4 – Utah Valley announced that it would join the Big West Conference from the Western Athletic Conference (WAC) in 2026–27.
- June 18 – Sacramento State announced it would join the Big West Conference from the Big Sky Conference in 2026–27.
- June 25 – Southern Utah and Utah Tech announced that they would both join the Big Sky Conference from the WAC in 2026–27.
- June 26 – The Atlantic Sun Conference (ASUN) and the Western Athletic Conference (WAC) announced a strategic alliance under which the WAC will rebrand as the United Athletic Conference (UAC) beginning with the 2026–27 academic year. The rebranding will allow the continuing conference to retain the WAC’s automatic qualification status for NCAA championship events, including basketball. Under the announced alignment:
  - The rebranded all-sports UAC will include the three remaining WAC institutions—Abilene Christian, Tarleton State, and non-football UT Arlington.
  - The five ASUN members that play football in the UAC—Austin Peay, Central Arkansas, Eastern Kentucky, North Alabama, and West Georgia—will also join the all-sports UAC.
  - Going forward, the ASUN will retain its seven current members that do not play scholarship FCS football. Five of these schools do not sponsor football at all; Stetson plays non-scholarship FCS football in the Pioneer Football League, while Bellarmine plays the non-NCAA variant of sprint football.
- June 30 – Texas State announced that it would join the Pac-12 Conference from the Sun Belt Conference in 2026–27, bringing the Pac-12 to the 8-member minimum threshold required to maintain its Division I FBS status. (Note: While the NCAA requires that FBS conferences have eight full members that sponsor football at that level, it only requires seven full members for official "multisport" status. The reimagined Pac-12 reached that membership level in September 2024 when it announced Utah State as an incoming member.)
- July 15 – Louisiana Tech announced that it would replace Texas State in the Sun Belt Conference from Conference USA. Louisiana Tech will join the Sun Belt no later than July 1, 2027.
- July 21 – The American Athletic Conference announced it had dropped the word "Athletic" from its name, becoming simply the American Conference. The conference also retired the "AAC" initialism, which had been used more by media than by the conference itself; the official short form is now simply the word "American".
- August 13 – Tennessee Tech announced it would join the Southern Conference from the Ohio Valley Conference (OVC) in 2026–27.
- September 3 – UC San Diego announced it would join the West Coast Conference (WCC) from the Big West Conference in 2027–28.
- September 24 – The Loyola Phoenix, the student newspaper of Loyola University Chicago, announced that 106-year-old Sister Jean, who began her tenure at Loyola in 1991, and had been chaplain of the men's basketball team since 1994, retired for health reasons.
- October 2 – The Northeast Conference adopted its longstanding abbreviation of NEC as its official name.
- October 9 – Loyola Chicago announced that Sister Jean had died at the age of 106.
- October 10 – Little Rock announced that it would join the United Athletic Conference (UAC) from the Ohio Valley Conference (OVC) in 2026–27.
- October 21 – The Associated Press named its preseason All-America team. The leading vote-getters were UCLA center Lauren Betts and Notre Dame guard Hannah Hidalgo. The other honorees were Texas forward Madison Booker, UConn forward Sarah Strong, and South Carolina guard Ta'Niya Latson.
- October 31 – The WCC announced that Denver would join from the Summit League in 2026–27.
- January 14, 2026 – At the annual NCAA convention, the Division I Cabinet approved changes to the transfer portal for several sports, including men's and women's basketball. Effective immediately:
  - A single 15-day portal was adopted for all D-I teams, opening the day after the final game of the NCAA tournament.
  - For players on teams undergoing a head coaching change, the portal will open for 15 days, starting 5 days after a new head coach is hired or publicly announced. If 30 days pass without the announcement of a new head coach, the portal will open for those players on the 31st day, as long as it falls after the championship game. This additional window is available only after the start of the standard portal.
  - Mid-year transfers will not be eligible to play for their new school during that season if they were enrolled at another NCAA member institution during the first academic term, regardless of whether or not they competed.
- March 5 – After several months of failed negotiations between Louisiana Tech and CUSA over the school's terms of departure, the University of Louisiana System, of which Tech is a member, filed suit against CUSA on Tech's behalf in Lincoln Parish. The suit sought to allow Tech to join the SBC on the school's desired July 2026 schedule.
- April 2 – West Florida announced that it accepted an invitation to join the ASUN from the Gulf South effective July 1, 2026, and begin reclassification from NCAA Division II to be eligible for NCAA-sponsored postseason play in 2028–29.

=== Milestones and records ===
- November 12 – Hannah Hidalgo set a single-game Division I record with 16 steals, as well as a school record of 44 points, in Notre Dame's 85–58 win over Akron.
- December 3 – Mikayla Blakes became the 9th player to score 1,000 career points in 42 or fewer games after dropping 28 points in Vanderbilt's 81–68 win over Virginia.
- January 22 – Hannah Hidalgo became the fastest women's basketball player in ACC history to reach 2,000 points, doing so in 86 games (the previous record was 89), after scoring 27 points in Notre Dame's 74–66 win over Miami (FL).
- February 14 – South Carolina coach Dawn Staley earned her 500th win as head coach of the Gamecocks following their 79–72 road win over LSU.

== Conference membership changes ==
A total of six schools joined new conferences for the 2025–26 season. Of these, five moved within Division I, one began reclassification from NCAA Division II.

School	Former conference	Current conference
Delaware	CAA	CUSA
Grand Canyon	Western Athletic	Mountain West
Missouri State	Missouri Valley	CUSA
New Haven	Northeast-10 (D–II)	Northeast
Seattle	Western Athletic	West Coast
UMass	A-10	MAC

The 2025–26 season was the last in their respective conferences for at least 27 Division I schools. It was also the last season for West Florida before starting reclassification from Division II.

School	2025–26 conference	Future conference
Austin Peay	Atlantic Sun	United Athletic
Boise State	Mountain West	Pac-12
California Baptist	Western Athletic	Big West
Central Arkansas	Atlantic Sun	United Athletic
Colorado State	Mountain West	Pac-12
Denver	Summit	West Coast
Eastern Kentucky	Atlantic Sun	United Athletic
Fresno State	Mountain West	Pac-12
Gonzaga	West Coast	Pac-12
Hawaii	Big West	Mountain West
Little Rock	Ohio Valley	United Athletic
North Alabama	Atlantic Sun	United Athletic
Northern Illinois	MAC	Horizon
Oregon State	West Coast	Pac-12
Sacramento State	Big Sky	Big West
Saint Francis	NEC	PAC (D–III)
San Diego State	Mountain West	Pac-12
Southern Utah	Western Athletic	Big Sky
Tennessee Tech	Ohio Valley	Southern
Texas State	Sun Belt	Pac-12
UC Davis	Big West	Mountain West
UTEP	CUSA	Mountain West
Utah State	Mountain West	Pac-12
Utah Tech	Western Athletic	Big Sky
Utah Valley	Western Athletic	Big West
Washington State	West Coast	Pac-12
West Florida	Gulf South (D–II)	Atlantic Sun
West Georgia	Atlantic Sun	United Athletic

== Arenas ==
=== New arenas ===
- St. Thomas left Schoenecker Arena after 44 seasons for the new Lee & Penny Anderson Arena. In the first half of a men's and women's doubleheader that officially opened the new arena on November 8, 2025, the Tommies women lost 67–61 to Army.
- Tarleton State left Wisdom Gym after 55 seasons for the new EECU Center. The Texans defeated NCAA Division III school Schreiner 90–35 in the new arena's first official basketball game on November 3, 2025.

=== Arena of new D-I teams ===
- New Haven played its first Division I home game at the Jeffrey P. Hazell Athletics Center on November 9, losing 57–45 to Iona.

=== Arena name changes ===
- The XL Center in Hartford, Connecticut, one of the home arenas of the UConn Huskies, was renamed to the PeoplesBank Arena on June 2, 2025.

=== Other arena changes ===
- On February 27, 2026, the governing board of Miami University in Ohio approved a planned multipurpose on-campus arena to replace Millett Hall, currently home to the men's and women's basketball teams. The new arena is planned to open for the 2028–29 season.

== Seasonal outlook ==
The Top 25 from the AP and USA Today Coaching polls

=== Pre-season polls ===
AP
Ranking	Team
1	UConn (27)
2	South Carolina (4)
3	UCLA
4	Texas
5	LSU
6	Oklahoma
7	Duke
8	Tennessee
9	NC State
10	Maryland
11	North Carolina
12	Ole Miss
13	Michigan
14	Iowa State
15	Notre Dame
16	Baylor
17	TCU
18	USC
19	Vanderbilt
20	Louisville
21	Iowa
22	Oklahoma State
23	Michigan State
24	Kentucky т
24	Richmond т

USA Today Coaches
Ranking	Team
1	UConn (28)
2	South Carolina (3)
3	Texas
4	UCLA
5	LSU
6	Duke
7	Oklahoma
8	NC State
9	Tennessee
10	Maryland
11	North Carolina
12	TCU
13	Notre Dame
14	Ole Miss
15	Michigan
16	USC
17	Iowa State
18	Baylor
19	Louisville
20	Kentucky
21	Vanderbilt
22	Oklahoma State
23	Iowa
24	Ohio State
25	Kansas State

=== Final polls ===
AP
Ranking	Team
1	UCLA (31)
2	South Carolina
3	UConn
4	Texas
5	Duke
6	TCU
7	Michigan
8	LSU
9	Notre Dame
10	Vanderbilt
11	Louisville
12	Oklahoma
13	North Carolina
14	Kentucky
15	Minnesota
16	Iowa
17	Ohio State
18	West Virginia
19	Virginia
20	Maryland
21	Ole Miss
22	Michigan State
23	Baylor
24	Alabama
25	Washington

USA Today Coaches
Ranking	Team
1	UCLA (31)
2	South Carolina
3	UConn
4	Texas
5	Duke
6	Michigan
7	LSU
8	Vanderbilt
9	TCU
10	Oklahoma
11	Louisville
12	Iowa
13	North Carolina
14	Notre Dame
15	Ohio State
16	West Virginia
17	Kentucky
18	Minnesota
19	Maryland
20	Michigan State
21	Baylor
22	Ole Miss
23	Texas Tech
24	Virginia
25	Princeton

== Top 10 matchups ==
Rankings reflect the AP poll Top 25.

=== Regular season ===
- Nov. 4, 2025
  - No. 9 NC State defeated No. 8 Tennessee, 80–77 (Ro Greensboro Invitational – First Horizon Coliseum, Greensboro, NC)
- Nov. 10
  - No. 3 UCLA defeated No. 6 Oklahoma, 73–59 (Golden 1 Center, Sacramento, CA)
- Nov. 15
  - No. 2 South Carolina defeated No. 8 USC, 69–52 (Crypto.com Arena, Los Angeles, CA)
- Nov. 21
  - No. 1 UConn defeated No. 6 Michigan, 72–69 (Mohegan Sun Arena, Uncasville, CT)
- Nov. 26
  - No. 4 Texas defeated No. 3 UCLA, 76–65 (Players Era Festival – Michelob Ultra Arena, Paradise, NV)
- Nov. 27
  - No. 4 Texas defeated No. 2 South Carolina, 66–64 (Players Era Festival – Michelob Ultra Arena, Paradise, NV)
- Jan. 11, 2026
  - No. 6 Kentucky defeated No. 5 Oklahoma, 63–57 (Memorial Coliseum, Lexington, KY)
- Jan. 15
  - No. 2 South Carolina defeated No. 4 Texas, 68–65 (Colonial Life Arena, Columbia, SC)
- Jan. 19
  - No. 5 Vanderbilt defeated No. 7 Michigan, 72–69 (Coretta Scott King Classic – Prudential Center, Newark, NJ)
- Jan. 25
  - No. 2 South Carolina defeated No. 5 Vanderbilt, 103–74 (Colonial Life Arena, Columbia, SC)
- Feb. 1
  - No. 4 Texas defeated No. 10 Oklahoma, 78–70 (College GameDay – Moody Center, Austin, TX)
  - No. 2 UCLA defeated No. 8 Iowa, 88–65 (Pauley Pavilion, Los Angeles, CA)
- Feb. 5
  - No. 4 Texas defeated No. 5 LSU, 77–64 (Moody Center, Austin, TX)
- Feb. 8
  - No. 2 UCLA defeated No. 8 Michigan, 69–66 (Crisler Center, Ann Arbor, MI)
- Feb. 9
  - No. 5 Vanderbilt defeated No. 10 Oklahoma, 102–86 (Memorial Gymnasium, Nashville, TN)
- Feb. 12
  - No. 5 Vanderbilt defeated No. 4 Texas, 86–70 (Memorial Gymnasium, Nashville, TN)
- Feb. 14
  - No. 3 South Carolina defeated No. 6 LSU, 79–72 (College GameDay – Pete Maravich Assembly Center, Baton Rouge, LA)

=== Conference tournament ===
- Mar. 6
  - No. 6 LSU defeated No. 7 Oklahoma 112–78 (SEC tournament – Bon Secours Wellness Arena, Greenville, SC)
- Mar. 7
  - No. 3 South Carolina defeated No. 6 LSU 83–77 (SEC tournament – Bon Secours Wellness Arena, Greenville, SC)
  - No. 9 Iowa defeated No. 8 Michigan 59–42 (Big Ten tournament – Gainbridge Fieldhouse, Indianapolis, IN)
- Mar. 8
  - No. 2 UCLA defeated No. 9 Iowa 96–45 (Big Ten tournament – Gainbridge Fieldhouse, Indianapolis, IN)
  - No. 4 Texas defeated No. 3 South Carolina 78–61 (SEC tournament – Bon Secours Wellness Arena, Greenville, SC)

=== Postseason tournament ===
- Mar. 27
  - No. 8 Duke defeated No. 5 LSU, 87–85 (Sweet Sixteen – Golden 1 Center, Sacramento, CA)
- Mar. 28
  - No. 4 South Carolina defeated No. 10 Oklahoma, 94–68 (Sweet Sixteen – Golden 1 Center, Sacramento, CA)
- Mar. 29
  - No. 2 UCLA defeated No. 8 Duke, 70–58 (Elite Eight – Golden 1 Center, Sacramento, CA)
- Mar. 30
  - No. 3 Texas defeated No. 9 Michigan, 77–41 (Elite Eight – Dickies Arena, Fort Worth, TX)
- Apr. 3
  - No. 4 South Carolina defeated No. 1 UConn, 62–48 (Final Four – Mortgage Matchup Center, Phoenix, AZ)
  - No. 2 UCLA defeated No. 3 Texas, 51–44 (Final Four – Mortgage Matchup Center, Phoenix, AZ)
- Apr. 5
  - No. 2 UCLA defeated No. 4 South Carolina, 79–51 (National championship game – Mortgage Matchup Center, Phoenix, AZ)

== Regular season ==
=== Early-season tournaments ===
Names	Dates	Location	Teams	Champion	Runner-up	3rd-place winner
Raising the B.A.R. Invitational	November 15–16, 2025	Haas Pavilion (Berkeley, CA)	4	California	Harvard	Charlotte
DePaul MTE	November 21–22, 2025	Wintrust Arena (Chicago, IL)	4	Northern Colorado	DePaul	Campbell
Great Alaska Shootout	November 21–22, 2025	Alaska Airlines Center (Anchorage, AK)	4	UC Irvine	St. Thomas (MN)	Bowling Green
Emerald Coast Classic	November 24–25, 2025	Raider Arena (Niceville, FL)	8	Mississippi State (Bay); Nebraska (Beach)	Middle Tennessee (Bay); Virginia (Beach)	Providence (Bay); Purdue Fort Wayne (Beach)
Baha Mar Hoops Pink Flamingo Championship	November 24–26, 2025	Baha Mar Convention Center (Nassau, Bahamas)	8	Ohio State (Goombay); Alabama (Junkanoo)	West Virginia (Goombay); Minnesota (Junkanoo)	McNeese (Goombay); South Florida (Junkanoo)
Players Era Championship	November 26–27, 2025	Michelob Ultra Arena (Paradise, NV)	4	Texas	South Carolina	UCLA
Paradise Jam	November 27–29, 2025	Sports and Fitness Center (Charlotte Amalie West, VI)	12	Boise State (Harbor); Vanderbilt (Island); LSU (Reef)	Tulane (Harbor); BYU (Island); Washington State (Reef)	Elon (Harbor); Virginia Tech (Island); Miami (OH) (Reef)
CBU Classic	November 28–29, 2025	Fowler Events Center (Riverside, CA)	4	UC Santa Barbara	Chattanooga	California Baptist
Iona Turkey Tip-Off	November 28–29, 2025	Hynes Athletic Center (New Rochelle, NY)	4	Iona	UIC	Maine
FIU Thanksgiving Classic	November 28–30, 2025	Ocean Bank Convocation Center (University Park, FL)	4	FIU	Seattle	UMBC
Coconut Hoops	November 28–30, 2025	Alico Arena (Fort Myers, FL)	8	Iowa State (Blue Heron); Oklahoma (Great Egret)	Indiana (Blue Heron); Florida State (Great Egret)	Gonzaga (Blue Heron); Missouri State (Great Egret)
Baha Mar Nassau Championship	November 28–30, 2025	Baha Mar Convention Center (Nassau, Bahamas)	8	Arkansas State (Goombay); Michigan State (Junkanoo)	Kent State (Goombay); Clemson (Junkanoo)	Houston (Goombay); Temple (Junkanoo)
HBCU Hoops Invitational	December 5–6, 2025	ESPN Wide World of Sports Complex (Bay Lake, FL)	4	Hampton	Edward Waters	Bethune–Cookman
Big 5 Classic	November 12–December 7, 2025	Finneran Pavilion (Villanova, PA)	6	Villanova	Saint Joseph's	Drexel
Tulane Holiday Tournament	December 20–21, 2025	Devlin Fieldhouse (New Orleans, LA)	4	Mercer	Tulane	Detroit Mercy
Hawk Classic	December 20–21, 2025	Hagan Arena (Philadelphia, PA)	4	Saint Joseph's	Delaware	Akron
Cherokee Invitational	December 21–22, 2025	Harrah's Cherokee (Cherokee, NC)	4	Michigan State	Ole Miss	Old Dominion
FDU Christmas Classic	December 29–30, 2025	Bogota Savings Bank Center (Hackensack, NJ)	4	Penn	Binghamton	Fairleigh Dickinson

=== Head-to-head conference challenges ===
Conference matchup	Dates	Conference winner	Conference loser	Record
ACC–SEC Challenge	December 3–4	SEC	ACC	**13–3**
Big Sky–Summit Challenge	December 3–6	Big Sky	Summit	**10–8**
MAC–SBC Challenge	November 3, 2025 – February 8, 2026	Tied		**13–13**

=== Upsets ===
An upset is a victory by an underdog team. In the context of NCAA Division I women's basketball, this generally constitutes an unranked team defeating a team currently ranked in the top 25. This list will highlight those upsets of ranked teams by unranked teams as well as upsets of No. 1 teams. Rankings are from the AP poll. Bold type indicates winning teams in "true road games"—i.e., those played on an opponent's home court (including secondary homes). Italics type indicates winning teams in an early season tournament (or event). Early season tournaments are tournaments played in the early season. Events are the tournaments with the same teams in it every year (even rivalry games).

Winner	Score	Loser	Date	Tournament/event	Notes
West Virginia	57–47	No. 15 Duke	November 14, 2025	Greenbrier Tip-Off	
St. John's	74–67	No. 18 Oklahoma State	November 19, 2025		
**Rhode Island**	68–63	No. 16 NC State	November 23, 2025		
Ohio State	83–81	No. 21 West Virginia	November 26, 2025	Baha Mar Hoops Pink Flamingo Championship	
**Villanova**	81–59	No. 25 West Virginia	December 1, 2025		
Kansas State	61–60	No. 13 Ole Miss	December 7, 2025	Bill Snyder Classic	Game played in St. Joseph, MO
Wisconsin	78–64	No. 20 Michigan State	December 7, 2025		
Stanford	67–62	No. 22 Washington	December 19, 2025		
**Texas Tech**	61–60	No. 15 Baylor	December 21, 2025		
Georgia Tech	95–90^{2OT}	No. 18 Notre Dame	January 1, 2026		
Illinois	73–70	No. 7 Maryland	January 1, 2026		
Washington	64–52	No. 6 Michigan	January 1, 2026		
Utah	87–77^{OT}	No. 8 TCU	January 3, 2026		
Duke	82–68	No. 18 Notre Dame	January 4, 2026		
**Stanford**	77–71^{OT}	No. 16 North Carolina	January 4, 2026		
**Oregon**	71–66	No. 21 USC	January 7, 2026		
Cincinnati	71–63	No. 11 Iowa State	January 8, 2026		
Alabama	64–51	No. 6 Kentucky	January 9, 2026		
Notre Dame	73–50	No. 22 North Carolina	January 11, 2026		
Purdue	78–72^{OT}	No. 23 Washington	January 11, 2026		
**West Virginia**	83–70	No. 11 Iowa State	January 11, 2026		
Minnesota	63–62	No. 21 USC	January 11, 2026		
Colorado	68–62	No. 19 Iowa State	January 14, 2026		
Auburn	58–54	No. 21 Alabama	January 15, 2026	We Back Pat	
**Kansas State**	65–59	No. 17 Texas Tech	January 17, 2026		
Georgia	82–59	No. 16 Ole Miss	January 18, 2026	We Back Pat	
Oklahoma State	86–58	No. 19 Iowa State	January 18, 2026		
Mississippi State	71–59	No. 7 Kentucky	January 18, 2026		
Wisconsin	63–60	No. 24 Nebraska	January 21, 2026		
BYU	73–61	No. 19 Texas Tech	January 21, 2026		
**Georgia**	72–67	No. 11 Kentucky	January 24, 2026		
Utah	71–64	No. 22 West Virginia	January 27, 2026		
**Iowa State**	84–70	No. 21 Texas Tech	January 28, 2026		
**Mississippi State**	77–62	No. 15 Tennessee	January 29, 2026		
USC	81–69	No. 8 Iowa	January 29, 2026		
**Columbia**	73–67	No. 19 Princeton	January 30, 2026		
**Oregon**	68–61	No. 16 Maryland	January 31, 2026		
**Illinois**	75–66	No. 25 Washington	February 1, 2026		
**Minnesota**	91–85	No. 10 Iowa	February 5, 2026		
Colorado	80–79	No. 14 TCU	February 8, 2026		
Texas A&M	72–69	No. 21 Alabama	February 8, 2026	Play4Kay	
Columbia	70–56	No. 24 Princeton	February 13, 2026		
Oklahoma State	75–65	No. 16 Texas Tech	February 14, 2026		
Georgia	76–74	No. 5 Vanderbilt	February 15, 2026		
**Texas A&M**	82–74	No. 21 Tennessee	February 19, 2026		
Colorado	75–68	No. 20 Texas Tech	February 21, 2026		
**Virginia**	74–72	No. 8 Louisville	February 22, 2026		
Clemson	53–51	No. 9 Duke	February 22, 2026		
Kansas	68–59	No. 20 Texas Tech	February 25, 2026		
Florida	74–67	No. 19 Ole Miss	February 26, 2026		
**Texas A&M**	66–58	No. 19 Ole Miss	March 1, 2026		
**Notre Dame**	65–62	No. 10 Louisville	March 1, 2026		
Kansas State	58–51	No. 21 Texas Tech	March 5, 2026	Big 12 tournament	
Illinois	71–69	No. 18 Michigan State	March 5, 2026	Big 10 tournament	
Oregon	73–68	No. 14 Maryland	March 5, 2026	Big 10 tournament	
Colorado	62–53	No. 20 Baylor	March 6, 2026	Big 12 tournament	

==== Non-Division I wins over Division I teams ====
In addition to the above listed upsets in which an unranked team defeated a ranked team, there have been ten non-Division I teams that defeated a Division I team so far this season. Bold type indicates winning teams in "true road games"—i.e., those played on an opponent's home court (including secondary homes). Italics type indicates winning teams in an early season tournament (or event). Early season tournaments are tournaments played in the early season. Events are the tournaments with the same teams in it every year (even rivalry games).

Winner	Score	Loser	Date	Tournament/event	Notes
**West Alabama** (Division II)	62–59	UAB	November 3, 2025		
**Delta State** (Division II)	76–68	Louisiana	November 7, 2025		
**Scranton** (Division III)	69–63	Pittsburgh	November 16, 2025		First time ever that a Division III team beat a power conference school in women's basketball
**Faulkner** (NAIA)	77–71	Alabama State	November 16, 2025		
**Carnegie Mellon** (Division III)	55–53	Saint Francis	November 18, 2025		
**Johns Hopkins** (Division III)	75–59	Morgan State	November 18, 2025		
**Loyola New Orleans** (NAIA)	73–65	New Orleans	November 19, 2025		
**Roosevelt** (Division II)	82–70^{OT}	Western Michigan	November 25, 2025		
Edward Waters (Division II)	55–46	Bethune–Cookman	December 5, 2025	HBCU Hoops Invitational	
**Rochester Christian** (NAIA)	86–80	Detroit Mercy	December 29, 2025		

=== Conference winners and tournaments ===
Each of the 31 Division I athletic conferences will end its regular season with a single-elimination tournament. The team with the best regular-season record in each conference receives the number one seed in each tournament, with tiebreakers used as needed in the case of ties for the top seeding. Unless otherwise noted, the winners of these tournaments will receive automatic invitations to the 2026 NCAA Division I women's basketball tournament.

Conference	Regular season first place	Conference player of the year	Conference coach of the year	Conference tournament	Tournament venue (city)	Tournament winner
America East Conference	Vermont	Adrianna Smith, Maine	Alisa Kresge, Vermont	2026 America East women's basketball tournament	Campus sites	Vermont
American Conference	Rice	Victoria Flores, Rice	Lindsay Edmonds, Rice	2026 American Conference women's basketball tournament	Legacy Arena; Birmingham, AL	UTSA
Atlantic Sun Conference	Eastern Kentucky	Priscilla Williams, Jacksonville	Greg Todd, Eastern Kentucky	2026 ASUN women's basketball tournament	VyStar Veterans Memorial Arena (Jacksonville, FL)	Jacksonville
Atlantic 10 Conference	George Mason & Rhode Island (Note: Top seed in conference tournament.)	Maggie Doogan, Richmond	Tammi Reiss, Rhode Island	2026 Atlantic 10 women's basketball tournament	Henrico Sports & Events Center (Henrico, VA)	Rhode Island
Atlantic Coast Conference	Duke	Hannah Hidalgo, Notre Dame	Kara Lawson, Duke	2026 ACC women's basketball tournament	Gas South Arena (Duluth, GA)	Duke
Big 12 Conference	TCU	Olivia Miles, TCU	Krista Gerlich, Texas Tech	2026 Big 12 Conference women's basketball tournament	T-Mobile Center (Kansas City, MO)	West Virginia
Big East Conference	UConn	Sarah Strong, UConn	Geno Auriemma, UConn	2026 Big East women's basketball tournament	Mohegan Sun Arena (Uncasville, CT)	UConn
Big Sky Conference	Idaho	Taylee Chirrick, Montana State	Arthur Moreira, Idaho	2026 Big Sky Conference women's basketball tournament	Idaho Central Arena (Boise, ID)	Idaho
Big South Conference	High Point	Macy Spencer, High Point	Mike McGuire, Radford & Terri Williams, Gardner–Webb	2026 Big South Conference women's basketball tournament	Freedom Hall Civic Center (Johnson City, TN)	High Point
Big Ten Conference	UCLA	Lauren Betts, UCLA	Cori Close, UCLA	2026 Big Ten women's basketball tournament	Gainbridge Fieldhouse (Indianapolis, IN)	UCLA
Big West Conference	UC Irvine & UC San Diego	Hunter Hernandez, UC Irvine	Tamara Inoue, UC Irvine	2026 Big West Conference women's basketball tournament	Lee's Family Forum (Henderson, NV)	UC San Diego
Coastal Athletic Association	Charleston	Taryn Barbot, Charleston	Robin Harmony, Charleston	2026 CAA women's basketball tournament	CareFirst Arena (Washington, D.C.)	Charleston
Conference USA	Louisiana Tech	Rhema Collins, FIU	Brooke Stoehr, Louisiana Tech	2026 Conference USA women's basketball tournament	Von Braun Center (Huntsville, AL)	Missouri State
Horizon League	Green Bay	Jenna Guyer, Green Bay	Kayla Karius, Green Bay	2026 Horizon League women's basketball tournament	Quarterfinals: Campus sites Semifinals and final: Corteva Coliseum (Indianapolis, IN)	Green Bay
Ivy League	Princeton	Riley Weiss, Columbia	Princeton (head coach: Carla Berube) (Note: The Ivy League and Patriot League present their top coaching awards to an entire staff, with all staff members individually cited in the announcement.)	2026 Ivy League women's basketball tournament	Newman Arena (Ithaca, NY)	Princeton
Metro Atlantic Athletic Conference	Fairfield & Quinnipiac	Kaety L’Amoreaux, Fairfield	Kelly Morrone, Merrimack	2026 MAAC women's basketball tournament	Boardwalk Hall (Atlantic City, NJ)	Fairfield
Mid-American Conference	Miami (OH)	Madi Morson, Central Michigan	Glenn Box, Miami (OH)	2026 Mid-American Conference women's basketball tournament	Rocket Arena (Cleveland, OH)	Miami (OH)
Mid-Eastern Athletic Conference	Howard	Zennia Thomas, Howard	Ty Grace, Howard	2026 MEAC women's basketball tournament	Norfolk Scope (Norfolk, VA)	Howard
Missouri Valley Conference	Murray State	Halli Poock, Murray State	Rechelle Turner, Murray State	2026 Missouri Valley Conference women's basketball tournament	Xtream Arena (Coralville, IA)	Murray State
Mountain West Conference	San Diego State	Nala Williams, San Diego State	Stacie Terry-Hutson, San Diego State	2026 Mountain West Conference women's basketball tournament	Thomas & Mack Center (Paradise, NV)	Colorado State
NEC	Fairleigh Dickinson	Kadidia Toure, LIU	Stephanie Gaitley, Fairleigh Dickinson	2026 NEC women's basketball tournament	Campus sites	Fairleigh Dickinson
Ohio Valley Conference	Lindenwood & Western Illinois	Mia Nicastro, Western Illinois	J. D. Gravina, Western Illinois	2026 Ohio Valley Conference women's basketball tournament	Ford Center (Evansville, IN)	Western Illinois
Patriot League	Navy	Zanai Barnett-Gay, Navy	Navy staff (head coach: Tim Taylor)	2026 Patriot League women's basketball tournament	Campus sites	Holy Cross
Southeastern Conference	South Carolina	Mikayla Blakes, Vanderbilt	Shea Ralph, Vanderbilt	2026 SEC women's basketball tournament	Bon Secours Wellness Arena (Greenville, SC)	Texas
Southern Conference	Chattanooga, East Tennessee State, & Wofford	Caia Elisaldez, Chattanooga	Brenda Mock Brown, ETSU	2026 Southern Conference women's basketball tournament	Harrah's Cherokee Center (Asheville, NC)	Samford
Southland Conference	McNeese	Vernell Atamah, Northwestern State	Ayla Guzzardo, McNeese	2026 Southland Conference women's basketball tournament	Townsley Law Arena (Lake Charles, LA)	Stephen F. Austin
Southwestern Athletic Conference	Alabama A&M	Kalia Walker, Alabama A&M	Dawn Thornton, Alabama A&M	2026 SWAC women's basketball tournament	Gateway Center Arena (College Park, GA)	Southern
Summit League	North Dakota State	Avery Koenen, North Dakota State	Jory Collins, North Dakota State	2026 Summit League women's basketball tournament	Denny Sanford Premier Center (Sioux Falls, SD)	South Dakota State
Sun Belt Conference	Georgia Southern	Kishyah Anderson, Georgia Southern	Hana Haden, Georgia Southern	2026 Sun Belt Conference women's basketball tournament	Pensacola Bay Center (Pensacola, FL)	James Madison
West Coast Conference	Loyola Marymount	Lauren Whittaker, Gonzaga	Aarika Hughes, Loyola Marymount	2026 West Coast Conference women's basketball tournament	Orleans Arena (Paradise, NV)	Gonzaga
Western Athletic Conference	California Baptist	Payton Hull, Abilene Christian	Jarrod Olson, California Baptist	2026 WAC women's basketball tournament	Orleans Arena (Paradise, NV)	California Baptist

== Conference standings ==
2025–26 America East Conference women's basketball standings
	Conf.				Overall
Team	W		L	PCT	W		L	PCT
Vermont †	13	–	3	.813	27	–	8	.771
Maine	12	–	4	.750	19	–	13	.594
Binghamton	10	–	6	.625	20	–	13	.606
UMBC	10	–	6	.625	17	–	15	.531
NJIT	9	–	7	.563	19	–	13	.594
Bryant	8	–	8	.500	18	–	12	.600
New Hampshire	4	–	12	.250	10	–	20	.333
Albany	4	–	12	.250	14	–	16	.467
UMass Lowell	2	–	14	.125	8	–	21	.276
† 2026 AmEast tournament winner

2025–26 American Conference women's basketball standings
	Conf.				Overall
Team	W		L	PCT	W		L	PCT
Rice	17	–	1	.944	29	–	6	.829
East Carolina	14	–	4	.778	22	–	10	.688
South Florida	13	–	5	.722	20	–	12	.625
Tulsa	11	–	7	.611	19	–	12	.613
North Texas	11	–	7	.611	19	–	14	.576
UTSA †	9	–	9	.500	18	–	16	.529
Temple	8	–	10	.444	15	–	17	.469
Charlotte	8	–	10	.444	14	–	18	.438
Florida Atlantic	7	–	11	.389	14	–	18	.438
Tulane	6	–	12	.333	11	–	20	.355
Wichita State	5	–	13	.278	8	–	23	.258
UAB	4	–	14	.222	11	–	19	.367
Memphis	4	–	14	.222	10	–	21	.323
† 2026 American tournament winner

2025–26 Atlantic 10 women's basketball standings
	Conf.				Overall
Team	W		L	PCT	W		L	PCT
Rhode Island †	16	–	2	.889	28	–	5	.848
George Mason	16	–	2	.889	23	–	10	.697
Richmond	15	–	3	.833	26	–	8	.765
Davidson	12	–	6	.667	21	–	12	.636
Saint Joseph's	10	–	8	.556	20	–	11	.645
La Salle	10	–	8	.556	19	–	14	.576
Dayton	9	–	9	.500	17	–	14	.548
Loyola Chicago	9	–	9	.500	16	–	18	.471
St. Bonaventure	7	–	11	.389	17	–	16	.515
George Washington	7	–	11	.389	18	–	18	.500
Saint Louis	5	–	13	.278	12	–	21	.364
Duquesne	4	–	14	.222	12	–	19	.387
VCU	4	–	14	.222	8	–	23	.258
Fordham	2	–	16	.111	10	–	20	.333
† 2026 A10 tournament winner

2025–26 ACC women's basketball standings
	Conf.				Overall
Team	W		L	PCT	W		L	PCT
No. 5 Duke †	16	–	2	.889	27	–	9	.750
No. 11 Louisville	15	–	3	.833	29	–	8	.784
No. 13 North Carolina	14	–	4	.778	28	–	8	.778
NC State	13	–	5	.722	21	–	11	.656
No. 9 Notre Dame	12	–	6	.667	25	–	10	.714
Virginia Tech	12	–	6	.667	23	–	10	.697
Syracuse	12	–	6	.667	24	–	9	.727
No. 19 Virginia	11	–	7	.611	22	–	12	.647
Clemson	11	–	7	.611	21	–	12	.636
California	9	–	9	.500	21	–	15	.583
Georgia Tech	8	–	10	.444	14	–	19	.424
Miami (FL)	8	–	10	.444	18	–	15	.545
Stanford	8	–	10	.444	21	–	14	.600
Florida State	5	–	13	.278	10	–	21	.323
Wake Forest	4	–	14	.222	14	–	18	.438
SMU	2	–	16	.111	9	–	21	.300
Pittsburgh	1	–	17	.056	8	–	23	.258
Boston College	1	–	17	.056	5	–	26	.161
† 2026 ACC tournament winner Rankings from AP Poll

2025–26 ASUN women's basketball standings
	Conf.				Overall
Team	W		L	PCT	W		L	PCT
Eastern Kentucky	15	–	3	.833	25	–	9	.735
Jacksonville †	13	–	5	.722	24	–	9	.727
Central Arkansas	13	–	5	.722	21	–	11	.656
Stetson	12	–	6	.667	20	–	12	.625
Florida Gulf Coast	11	–	7	.611	16	–	16	.500
North Alabama	11	–	7	.611	17	–	14	.548
West Georgia*	10	–	8	.556	18	–	13	.581
Austin Peay	8	–	10	.444	19	–	14	.576
Lipscomb	7	–	11	.389	10	–	20	.333
North Florida	4	–	14	.222	9	–	21	.300
Queens	4	–	14	.222	10	–	20	.333
Bellarmine	0	–	18	.000	2	–	30	.063
† 2026 ASUN tournament winner * ineligible for the 2026 NCAA tournament due to transition from Division II

2025–26 Big 12 women's basketball standings
	Conf.				Overall
Team	W		L	PCT	W		L	PCT
No. 6 TCU	15	–	3	.833	32	–	6	.842
No. 18 West Virginia †	14	–	4	.778	28	–	7	.800
No. 23 Baylor	13	–	5	.722	25	–	9	.735
Oklahoma State	12	–	6	.667	24	–	10	.706
Texas Tech	12	–	6	.667	26	–	8	.765
Colorado	11	–	7	.611	22	–	12	.647
Iowa State	10	–	8	.556	22	–	10	.688
Utah	10	–	8	.556	19	–	13	.594
BYU	9	–	9	.500	26	–	12	.684
Arizona State	9	–	9	.500	24	–	11	.686
Kansas	8	–	10	.444	22	–	14	.611
Kansas State	8	–	10	.444	19	–	18	.514
Cincinnati	6	–	12	.333	11	–	20	.355
UCF	3	–	15	.167	11	–	19	.367
Arizona	3	–	15	.167	12	–	18	.400
Houston	1	–	17	.056	7	–	23	.233
† 2026 Big 12 tournament winner Rankings from AP poll

2025–26 Big East women's basketball standings
	Conf.				Overall
Team	W		L	PCT	W		L	PCT
No. 3 UConn †	20	–	0	1.000	38	–	1	.974
Villanova	16	–	4	.800	25	–	8	.758
Seton Hall	12	–	8	.600	19	–	13	.594
Marquette	12	–	8	.600	18	–	12	.600
Creighton	11	–	9	.550	16	–	15	.516
St. John's	11	–	9	.550	22	–	12	.647
Providence	7	–	13	.350	15	–	18	.455
Butler	6	–	14	.300	12	–	19	.387
Georgetown	6	–	14	.300	14	–	17	.452
DePaul	5	–	15	.250	8	–	24	.250
Xavier	4	–	16	.200	11	–	19	.367
† 2026 Big East tournament winner Rankings from AP poll

2025–26 Big Sky women's basketball standings
	Conf.				Overall
Team	W		L	PCT	W		L	PCT
Idaho †	17	–	1	.944	29	–	6	.829
Montana State	16	–	2	.889	27	–	8	.771
Northern Colorado	13	–	5	.722	23	–	11	.676
Idaho State	12	–	6	.667	19	–	11	.633
Sacramento State	8	–	10	.444	15	–	18	.455
Eastern Washington	7	–	11	.389	15	–	18	.455
Northern Arizona	6	–	12	.333	10	–	22	.313
Montana	5	–	13	.278	9	–	22	.290
Weber State	4	–	14	.222	11	–	22	.333
Portland State	2	–	16	.111	6	–	25	.194
† 2026 Big Sky tournament winner

2025–26 Big South women's basketball standings
	Conf.				Overall
Team	W		L	PCT	W		L	PCT
High Point †	13	–	3	.813	27	–	6	.818
Radford	12	–	4	.750	23	–	13	.639
Longwood	11	–	5	.688	21	–	10	.677
Gardner–Webb	9	–	7	.563	12	–	19	.387
Winthrop	7	–	9	.438	15	–	17	.469
UNC Asheville	7	–	9	.438	12	–	18	.400
Charleston Southern	6	–	10	.375	8	–	22	.267
USC Upstate	6	–	10	.375	12	–	20	.375
Presbyterian	1	–	15	.063	3	–	27	.100
† 2026 Big South tournament winner

2025–26 Big Ten women's basketball standings
	Conf.				Overall
Team	W		L	PCT	W		L	PCT
No. 1 UCLA †	18	–	0	1.000	37	–	1	.974
No. 7 Michigan	15	–	3	.833	28	–	7	.800
No. 16 Iowa	15	–	3	.833	27	–	7	.794
No. 17 Ohio State	13	–	5	.722	27	–	8	.771
No. 15 Minnesota	13	–	5	.722	24	–	9	.727
No. 20 Maryland	11	–	7	.611	24	–	9	.727
No. 22 Michigan State	11	–	7	.611	23	–	9	.719
No. 25 Washington	10	–	8	.556	22	–	11	.667
USC	9	–	9	.500	18	–	14	.563
Illinois	9	–	9	.500	22	–	12	.647
Oregon	8	–	10	.444	23	–	13	.639
Nebraska	7	–	11	.389	19	–	13	.594
Indiana	6	–	12	.333	18	–	14	.563
Purdue	5	–	13	.278	13	–	17	.433
Wisconsin	5	–	13	.278	16	–	18	.471
Penn State	4	–	14	.222	11	–	18	.379
Northwestern	2	–	16	.111	8	–	21	.276
Rutgers	1	–	17	.056	9	–	20	.310
† 2026 Big Ten tournament winner Rankings from AP poll

2025–26 Big West women's basketball standings
	Conf.				Overall
Team	W		L	PCT	W		L	PCT
UC Irvine	17	–	3	.850	26	–	7	.788
UC San Diego †	17	–	3	.850	24	–	9	.727
UC Davis	15	–	5	.750	23	–	11	.676
Hawai'i	14	–	6	.700	22	–	11	.667
Cal State Fullerton	13	–	7	.650	18	–	14	.563
UC Santa Barbara	12	–	8	.600	20	–	10	.667
UC Riverside	8	–	12	.400	11	–	21	.344
Cal State Northridge	6	–	14	.300	10	–	20	.333
Long Beach State	4	–	16	.200	5	–	25	.167
Cal State Bakersfield	2	–	18	.100	7	–	23	.233
Cal Poly	2	–	18	.100	4	–	26	.133
† 2026 Big West tournament winner

2025–26 CAA women's basketball standings
	Conf.				Overall
Team	W		L	PCT	W		L	PCT
Charleston †	16	–	2	.889	27	–	6	.818
Campbell	13	–	5	.722	20	–	12	.625
Drexel	13	–	5	.722	21	–	11	.656
Stony Brook	12	–	6	.667	18	–	15	.545
Monmouth	12	–	6	.667	21	–	12	.636
Elon	10	–	8	.556	16	–	16	.500
Towson	10	–	8	.556	17	–	14	.548
William & Mary	9	–	9	.500	17	–	14	.548
North Carolina A&T	7	–	11	.389	12	–	18	.400
Hofstra	6	–	12	.333	11	–	22	.333
Hampton	4	–	14	.222	10	–	21	.323
Northeastern	3	–	15	.167	7	–	22	.241
UNC Wilmington	2	–	16	.111	7	–	24	.226
† 2026 CAA tournament winner

2025–26 Conference USA women's basketball standings
	Conf.				Overall
Team	W		L	PCT	W		L	PCT
Louisiana Tech	17	–	1	.944	26	–	7	.788
FIU	12	–	6	.667	21	–	12	.636
Middle Tennessee	11	–	7	.611	17	–	16	.515
Sam Houston	11	–	7	.611	18	–	13	.581
Liberty	11	–	7	.611	18	–	13	.581
Missouri State †	11	–	7	.611	23	–	13	.639
Jacksonville State	9	–	9	.500	16	–	16	.500
Delaware	6	–	12	.333	13	–	19	.406
Kennesaw State	6	–	12	.333	13	–	17	.433
UTEP	5	–	13	.278	13	–	17	.433
New Mexico State	5	–	13	.278	9	–	21	.300
Western Kentucky	4	–	14	.222	8	–	21	.276
† 2026 CUSA tournament winner

2025–26 Horizon League women's basketball standings
	Conf.				Overall
Team	W		L	PCT	W		L	PCT
Green Bay †	17	–	3	.850	25	–	9	.735
Youngstown State	15	–	5	.750	25	–	10	.714
Cleveland State	13	–	7	.650	26	–	10	.722
Northern Kentucky	12	–	8	.600	15	–	17	.469
Purdue Fort Wayne	12	–	8	.600	21	–	14	.600
Robert Morris	11	–	9	.550	18	–	12	.600
IU Indy	9	–	11	.450	14	–	17	.452
Oakland	7	–	13	.350	10	–	21	.323
Wright State	6	–	14	.300	10	–	22	.313
Milwaukee	4	–	16	.200	8	–	24	.250
Detroit Mercy	4	–	16	.200	7	–	24	.226
† 2026 Horizon League tournament winner

2025–26 Ivy League women's basketball standings
	Conf.				Overall
Team	W		L	PCT	W		L	PCT
Princeton †	12	–	2	.857	26	–	4	.867
Columbia	11	–	3	.786	25	–	8	.758
Harvard	10	–	4	.714	20	–	12	.625
Brown	8	–	6	.571	16	–	11	.593
Penn	7	–	7	.500	17	–	10	.630
Cornell	4	–	10	.286	9	–	18	.333
Yale	3	–	11	.214	7	–	20	.259
Dartmouth	1	–	13	.071	10	–	17	.370
† 2026 Ivy League tournament winner

2025–26 MAAC women's basketball standings
	Conf.				Overall
Team	W		L	PCT	W		L	PCT
Quinnipiac	19	–	1	.950	27	–	7	.794
Fairfield †	19	–	1	.950	28	–	5	.848
Merrimack	15	–	5	.750	19	–	13	.594
Iona	12	–	8	.600	20	–	12	.625
Siena	11	–	9	.550	13	–	17	.433
Mount St. Mary's	11	–	9	.550	15	–	15	.500
Sacred Heart	10	–	10	.500	13	–	18	.419
Manhattan	10	–	10	.500	11	–	20	.355
Marist	8	–	12	.400	11	–	20	.355
Saint Peter's	6	–	14	.300	7	–	23	.233
Rider	5	–	15	.250	7	–	22	.241
Canisius	3	–	17	.150	5	–	24	.172
Niagara	1	–	19	.050	1	–	28	.034
† 2026 MAAC tournament winner

2025–26 Mid-American Conference women's basketball standings
	Conf.				Overall
Team	W		L	PCT	W		L	PCT
Miami (OH) †	16	–	2	.889	28	–	7	.800
Ball State	16	–	2	.889	26	–	7	.788
UMass	15	–	3	.833	23	–	7	.767
Central Michigan	12	–	6	.667	18	–	12	.600
Ohio	11	–	7	.611	18	–	14	.563
Toledo	9	–	9	.500	17	–	15	.531
Bowling Green	9	–	9	.500	17	–	14	.548
Kent State	9	–	9	.500	15	–	16	.484
Eastern Michigan	6	–	12	.333	13	–	16	.448
Western Michigan	5	–	13	.278	9	–	20	.310
Akron	4	–	14	.222	7	–	24	.226
Northern Illinois	4	–	14	.222	7	–	23	.233
Buffalo	1	–	17	.056	3	–	27	.100
† 2026 MAC tournament winner

2025–26 MEAC women's basketball standings
	Conf.				Overall
Team	W		L	PCT	W		L	PCT
Howard †	13	–	1	.929	26	–	8	.765
Maryland Eastern Shore	11	–	3	.786	20	–	15	.571
Norfolk State	11	–	3	.786	18	–	15	.545
Coppin State	6	–	8	.429	10	–	23	.303
North Carolina Central	5	–	9	.357	9	–	20	.310
Morgan State	4	–	10	.286	5	–	26	.161
Delaware State	4	–	10	.286	7	–	23	.233
South Carolina State	2	–	12	.143	5	–	25	.167
† 2026 MEAC tournament winner

2025–26 Missouri Valley Conference women's basketball standings
	Conf.				Overall
Team	W		L	PCT	W		L	PCT
Murray State †	19	–	1	.950	31	–	4	.886
Belmont	16	–	4	.800	20	–	12	.625
Illinois State	13	–	7	.650	24	–	14	.632
Northern Iowa	13	–	7	.650	18	–	14	.563
Bradley	13	–	7	.650	20	–	13	.606
Drake	10	–	10	.500	12	–	20	.375
UIC	9	–	11	.450	14	–	18	.438
Southern Illinois	7	–	13	.350	10	–	20	.333
Indiana State	5	–	15	.250	10	–	22	.313
Evansville	5	–	15	.250	10	–	25	.286
Valparaiso	0	–	20	.000	0	–	32	.000
† 2026 MVC tournament winner

2025–26 Mountain West Conference women's basketball standings
	Conf.				Overall
Team	W		L	PCT	W		L	PCT
San Diego State	19	–	1	.950	27	–	6	.818
UNLV	15	–	5	.750	21	–	11	.656
Colorado State †	15	–	5	.750	27	–	8	.771
New Mexico	14	–	6	.700	22	–	10	.688
Boise State	14	–	6	.700	25	–	9	.735
Grand Canyon	11	–	9	.550	13	–	19	.406
Fresno State	8	–	12	.400	15	–	18	.455
Wyoming	7	–	13	.350	10	–	20	.333
Air Force	7	–	13	.350	16	–	19	.457
Nevada	6	–	14	.300	10	–	21	.323
Utah State	2	–	18	.100	6	–	24	.200
San Jose State	2	–	18	.100	4	–	28	.125
† 2026 Mountain West tournament winner

2025–26 Northeast Conference women's basketball standings
	Conf.				Overall
Team	W		L	PCT	W		L	PCT
Fairleigh Dickinson †	18	–	0	1.000	30	–	5	.857
Mercyhurst*	14	–	4	.778	15	–	17	.469
LIU	14	–	4	.778	21	–	11	.656
Wagner	9	–	9	.500	13	–	17	.433
Le Moyne*	9	–	9	.500	12	–	21	.364
Chicago State	8	–	10	.444	9	–	23	.281
Stonehill	8	–	10	.444	12	–	18	.400
New Haven**	5	–	13	.278	7	–	22	.241
Saint Francis	3	–	15	.167	3	–	27	.100
Central Connecticut	2	–	16	.111	2	–	27	.069
† 2026 NEC tournament winner * ineligible for the 2026 NCAA tournament due to transition from Division II ** ineligible for both the 2026 NEC tournament and the 2026 NCAA tournament due to transition from Division II

2025–26 Ohio Valley Conference women's basketball standings
	Conf.				Overall
Team	W		L	PCT	W		L	PCT
Western Illinois †	16	–	4	.800	26	–	6	.813
Lindenwood	16	–	4	.800	25	–	8	.758
Southern Indiana	14	–	6	.700	21	–	10	.677
Morehead State	13	–	7	.650	18	–	15	.545
Little Rock	11	–	9	.550	15	–	15	.500
UT Martin	9	–	11	.450	13	–	17	.433
SIU Edwardsville	8	–	12	.400	16	–	16	.500
Southeast Missouri State	8	–	12	.400	14	–	18	.438
Tennessee Tech	8	–	12	.400	15	–	14	.517
Tennessee State	4	–	16	.200	5	–	24	.172
Eastern Illinois	3	–	17	.150	4	–	27	.129
† 2026 OVC tournament winner

2025–26 Patriot League women's basketball standings
	Conf.				Overall
Team	W		L	PCT	W		L	PCT
Navy	16	–	2	.889	22	–	8	.733
Holy Cross †	14	–	4	.778	23	–	10	.697
Army	14	–	4	.778	26	–	8	.765
Lehigh	11	–	7	.611	17	–	14	.548
Loyola	8	–	10	.444	12	–	18	.400
Lafayette	7	–	11	.389	11	–	19	.367
Bucknell	7	–	11	.389	11	–	19	.367
Boston University	6	–	12	.333	11	–	20	.355
American	5	–	13	.278	7	–	23	.233
Colgate	2	–	16	.111	7	–	24	.226
† 2026 Patriot League tournament winner

2025–26 SEC women's basketball standings
	Conf.				Overall
Team	W		L	PCT	W		L	PCT
No. 2 South Carolina	15	–	1	.938	36	–	4	.900
No. 10 Vanderbilt	13	–	3	.813	29	–	5	.853
No. 4 Texas †	13	–	3	.813	35	–	4	.897
No. 8 LSU	12	–	4	.750	29	–	6	.829
No. 12 Oklahoma	11	–	5	.688	26	–	8	.765
Tennessee	8	–	8	.500	16	–	14	.533
No. 21 Ole Miss	8	–	8	.500	24	–	12	.667
Georgia	8	–	8	.500	22	–	10	.688
No. 14 Kentucky	8	–	8	.500	25	–	11	.694
Texas A&M	7	–	9	.438	14	–	13	.519
No. 24 Alabama	7	–	9	.438	24	–	11	.686
Florida	5	–	11	.313	18	–	15	.545
Mississippi State	5	–	11	.313	18	–	13	.581
Missouri	4	–	12	.250	17	–	17	.500
Auburn	3	–	13	.188	15	–	17	.469
Arkansas	1	–	15	.063	12	–	20	.375
† 2026 SEC tournament winner Rankings from AP poll

2025–26 Southern Conference women's basketball standings
	Conf.				Overall
Team	W		L	PCT	W		L	PCT
Chattanooga	10	–	4	.714	20	–	11	.645
East Tennessee State	10	–	4	.714	18	–	13	.581
Wofford	10	–	4	.714	16	–	13	.552
Furman	9	–	5	.643	18	–	13	.581
Mercer	7	–	7	.500	17	–	13	.567
Samford †	6	–	8	.429	16	–	19	.457
UNC Greensboro	4	–	10	.286	14	–	16	.467
Western Carolina	0	–	14	.000	3	–	26	.103
† 2026 SoCon tournament winner

2025–26 Southland Conference women's basketball standings
	Conf.				Overall
Team	W		L	PCT	W		L	PCT
McNeese	21	–	1	.955	29	–	6	.829
Lamar	17	–	5	.773	20	–	11	.645
Stephen F. Austin †	16	–	6	.727	25	–	10	.714
UT Rio Grande Valley	16	–	6	.727	21	–	14	.600
Northwestern State	14	–	8	.636	18	–	14	.563
Incarnate Word	11	–	11	.500	13	–	17	.433
Nicholls	10	–	12	.455	15	–	16	.484
East Texas A&M	9	–	13	.409	13	–	17	.433
Houston Christian	6	–	16	.273	8	–	21	.276
Texas A&M–Corpus Christi	5	–	17	.227	6	–	23	.207
Southeastern Louisiana	4	–	18	.182	5	–	24	.172
New Orleans	3	–	19	.136	3	–	27	.100
† 2026 Southland tournament winner

2025–26 SWAC women's basketball standings
	Conf.				Overall
Team	W		L	PCT	W		L	PCT
Alabama A&M	17	–	1	.944	22	–	11	.667
Alcorn State	14	–	4	.778	17	–	14	.548
Alabama State	12	–	6	.667	17	–	15	.531
Southern †	12	–	6	.667	20	–	14	.588
Jackson State	10	–	8	.556	12	–	19	.387
Grambling State	10	–	8	.556	13	–	19	.406
Arkansas–Pine Bluff	10	–	8	.556	15	–	16	.484
Florida A&M	7	–	11	.389	9	–	22	.290
Mississippi Valley State	6	–	12	.333	8	–	23	.258
Texas Southern	6	–	12	.333	10	–	21	.323
Bethune–Cookman	4	–	14	.222	7	–	26	.212
Prairie View A&M	0	–	18	.000	2	–	28	.067
† 2026 SWAC tournament winner

2025–26 Summit League women's basketball standings
	Conf.				Overall
Team	W		L	PCT	W		L	PCT
North Dakota State	15	–	1	.938	29	–	5	.853
South Dakota State †	14	–	2	.875	27	–	7	.794
South Dakota	12	–	4	.750	26	–	10	.722
Oral Roberts	8	–	8	.500	15	–	15	.500
St. Thomas	8	–	8	.500	16	–	16	.500
Denver	5	–	11	.313	11	–	19	.367
Kansas City	4	–	12	.250	7	–	23	.233
North Dakota	3	–	13	.188	7	–	24	.226
Omaha	3	–	13	.188	6	–	27	.182
† 2026 Summit League tournament winner

2025–26 Sun Belt Conference women's basketball standings
	Conf.				Overall
Team	W		L	PCT	W		L	PCT
Georgia Southern	16	–	2	.889	23	–	8	.742
Troy	15	–	3	.833	25	–	8	.758
Arkansas State	14	–	4	.778	27	–	10	.730
James Madison †	14	–	4	.778	26	–	9	.743
Marshall	13	–	5	.722	28	–	9	.757
Old Dominion	9	–	9	.500	18	–	14	.563
Southern Miss	8	–	10	.444	15	–	16	.484
Texas State	7	–	11	.389	11	–	19	.367
Coastal Carolina	7	–	11	.389	14	–	18	.438
Louisiana–Monroe	7	–	11	.389	17	–	16	.515
Georgia State	5	–	13	.278	10	–	21	.323
South Alabama	5	–	13	.278	17	–	19	.472
Appalachian State	4	–	14	.222	11	–	19	.367
Louisiana	2	–	16	.111	5	–	26	.161
† 2026 Sun Belt tournament winner

2025–26 WAC women's basketball standings
	Conf.				Overall
Team	W		L	PCT	W		L	PCT
California Baptist †	15	–	3	.833	23	–	11	.676
Abilene Christian	13	–	5	.722	24	–	11	.686
Southern Utah	11	–	7	.611	19	–	13	.594
Utah Valley	9	–	9	.500	16	–	15	.516
Tarleton	7	–	11	.389	14	–	17	.452
UT Arlington	4	–	14	.222	12	–	21	.364
Utah Tech	4	–	14	.222	9	–	20	.310
† 2026 WAC tournament winner

2025–26 West Coast Conference women's basketball standings
	Conf.				Overall
Team	W		L	PCT	W		L	PCT
Loyola Marymount	15	–	3	.833	21	–	10	.677
Gonzaga †	14	–	4	.778	24	–	10	.706
Santa Clara	13	–	5	.722	24	–	10	.706
Oregon State	13	–	5	.722	23	–	12	.657
Portland	11	–	7	.611	20	–	15	.571
Pepperdine	10	–	8	.556	21	–	13	.618
San Francisco	9	–	9	.500	19	–	15	.559
Pacific	6	–	12	.333	11	–	19	.367
Washington State	6	–	12	.333	9	–	25	.265
Saint Mary's	6	–	12	.333	15	–	17	.469
San Diego	4	–	14	.222	11	–	22	.333
Seattle	1	–	17	.056	5	–	25	.167
† 2026 WCC tournament winner

== Postseason tournaments ==
The NCAA tournament tipped off on March 18, 2026, with the First Four, and will conclude on April 5 at Mortgage Matchup Center in Phoenix, Arizona. A total of 68 teams entered the tournament. Thirty-one of the teams earned automatic bids by winning their conferences tournaments. The remaining 37 teams were granted "at-large" bids, which were extended by the NCAA Selection Committee.

=== Final Four - Mortgage Matchup Center in Phoenix, Arizona ===
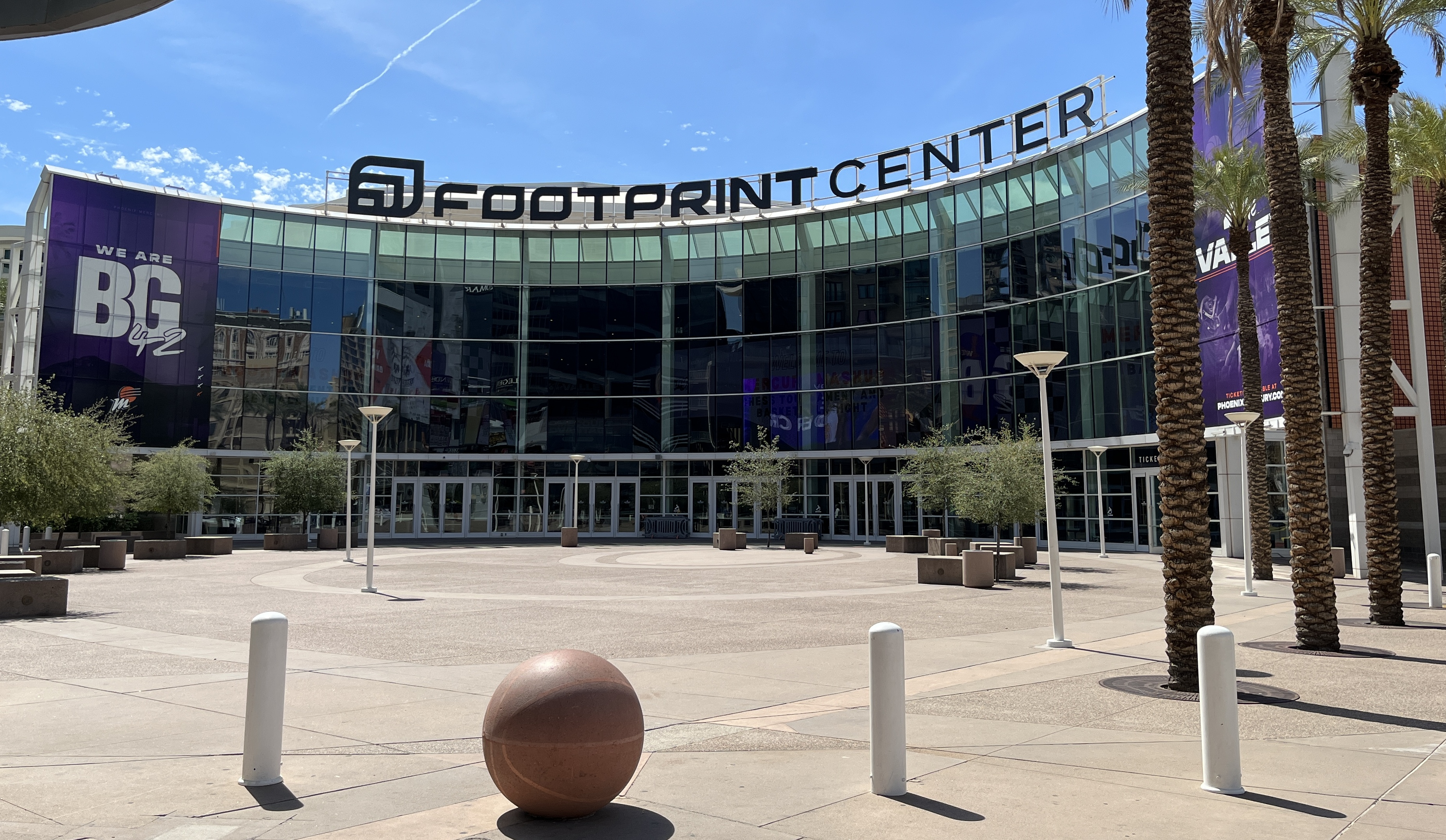
Mortgage Matchup Center in Phoenix, Arizona, hosted the NCAA women's Final Four.

National Semifinals; Final Four; Friday, April 3
S4 (1)	South Carolina	62
FW1 (1)	UConn	48
FW3 (1)	Texas	44
S2 (1)	UCLA	51

National Championship Game; Sunday, April 5
S4 (1)	South Carolina	51
S2 (1)	UCLA	79

=== Tournament upsets ===
Per the NCAA, an upset occurs when the losing team in an NCAA tournament game was seeded at least two seed lines better than the winning team."

Upsets in the 2026 NCAA Division I women's basketball tournament
Round	Fort Worth Regional 1	Sacramento Regional 2	Fort Worth Regional 3	Sacramento Regional 4
Round of 64	None			
Round of 32	None			No. 10 Virginia defeated No. 2 Iowa, 83–75^{2OT}
Sweet 16	No. 6 Notre Dame defeated No. 2 Vanderbilt, 67–64	None		
Elite 8	None			
Final 4	None			
National Championship	None			

=== Women's Basketball Invitation Tournament ===
After the NCAA tournament field is announced, the NCAA invites 32 teams to the Women's Basketball Invitation Tournament. The teams determined by the NCAA tournament selection committee to be the "first four out" of the NCAA tournament receive the top four seeds in the WBIT. Also, teams that won regular-season conference titles but did not receive NCAA tournament invitations, if otherwise eligible for NCAA-sponsored postseason play, receive automatic bids. All WBIT games through the quarterfinals are held at campus sites, with the semifinals and finals taking place in Wichita, Kansas at Charles Koch Arena.

==== Semifinals and finals ====
Semifinals; March 30; Charles Koch Arena
1	BYU	70
2	Kansas	67
3	Wisconsin	50
4	Columbia	67

Final; April 1 Charles Koch Arena
1	BYU	64
4	Columbia	81

=== Women's National Invitation Tournament ===
After the NCAA tournament and WBIT fields are announced, the Women's National Invitation Tournament will invite 48 teams to participate. WNIT participants and sites will be announced when the field is set on March 16.

==== Semifinals and finals ====
Fab 4 April 1
(H)	South Dakota	60
Illinois State	67
Marshall	69
(H)	Arkansas State	62

Championship; April 4
Illinois State	41
(H)	Marshall	66

== Award winners ==
=== 2026 Consensus All-Americans ===
The NCAA has never recognized a consensus All-America team in women's basketball. This differs from the practice in men's basketball, in which the NCAA uses a combination of selections by the Associated Press (AP), the National Association of Basketball Coaches (NABC), The Sporting News and the United States Basketball Writers Association (USBWA) to determine a consensus All-America team. The selection of a consensus team is possible because all four organizations select at least a first and second team, with only the USBWA not selecting a third team.

Consensus First Team
Player	Position	Class	Team

Consensus Second Team
Player	Position	Class	Team

=== Major player of the year awards ===
- Wooden Award: Sarah Strong, UConn
- Naismith Award: Sarah Strong, UConn
- Associated Press Player of the Year: Sarah Strong, UConn
- Wade Trophy: Sarah Strong, UConn
- Ann Meyers Drysdale Women's Player of the Year (USBWA): Sarah Strong, UConn
- Honda Sports Award: Lauren Betts , UCLA

=== Major freshman of the year awards ===
- Tamika Catchings Award (USBWA): Jazzy Davidson, USC
- WBCA Freshman of the Year: Jazzy Davidson, USC

=== Major coach of the year awards ===
- Associated Press Coach of the Year: Shea Ralph, Vanderbilt
- Naismith College Coach of the Year: Shea Ralph, Vanderbilt
- Geno Auriemma Award (USBWA): Shea Ralph, Vanderbilt
- WBCA National Coach of the Year: Shea Ralph, Vanderbilt
- WBCA Assistant Coach of the Year: Kevin DeMille, Vanderbilt

=== Other major awards ===
- Naismith Starting Five:
  - Nancy Lieberman Award (top point guard): Hannah Hidalgo, Notre Dame
  - Ann Meyers Drysdale Award (top shooting guard): Mikayla Blakes, Vanderbilt
  - Cheryl Miller Award (top small forward): Madison Booker, Texas
  - Katrina McClain Award (top power forward): Sarah Strong, UConn
  - Lisa Leslie Award (top center): Lauren Betts, UCLA
- WBCA Defensive Player of the Year: Hannah Hidalgo, Notre Dame
- Naismith Women's Defensive Player of the Year: Hannah Hidalgo, Notre Dame
- Becky Hammon Mid-Major Player of the Year Award: Brooklyn Meyer, South Dakota State
- Kathy Delaney-Smith Mid-Major Coach of the Year Award: Carla Berube, Princeton
- Maggie Dixon Award (top rookie head coach): Katie Kuester, Army
- Academic All-American of the Year (top scholar-athlete): Azzi Fudd, UConn
- Elite Scholar-Athlete Award (top GPA among upperclass players at Final Four): Kayleigh Heckel, UConn
- Pat Summitt Most Courageous Award: Rhet Wierzba, assistant coach, Indiana

== Coaching changes ==
Many teams will change coaches during the season and after it ends.

Team	Former	Interim	New	Reason
Alabama	Kristy Curry	—N/a	Pauline Love	Curry left Alabama on March 24, 2026 after 13 seasons for the South Florida opening. Oklahoma associate head coach Love, who served as assistant coach and recruiting coordinator with the Crimson Tide last season, was hired on April 1.
Albany	Colleen Mullen	—N/a	Kelly Morrone	Mullen left Albany on March 29, 2026 after eight seasons for Rhode Island. The Great Danes hired Merrimack head coach Marrone on April 4.
Bethune–Cookman	Janell Crayton	—N/a	Demetria Frank	Bethune–Cookman parted ways with Crayton on March 14, 2026 after a 48–101 record in five seasons. Former Wildcat star player Demetria Frank, who was serving as associate head coach at George Mason under former B–CU head coach Vanessa Blair-Lewis, was hired on April 1.
Boston College	Joanna Bernabei-McNamee	—N/a	Kate Popovec-Goss	BC announced on March 1, 2026 that Bernabei-McNamee's contract would not be renewed, ending her 8-year tenure with a 113–132 record. Bradley head coach Popovec-Goss was hired as the Eagles' new head coach on March 27.
Bradley	Kate Popovec-Goss	—N/a	Chaia Meier	Popovec-Goss left Bradley on March 27, 2026 after four seasons for the Boston College opening. Marquette assistant coach Meier was hired by the Braves on April 3.
Butler	Austin Parkinson	—N/a	Maria Marchesano	Butler and Parkinson mutually agreed to part ways on April 6, 2026 after a 54–73 record in four seasons. Purdue Fort Wayne head coach and Butler alum Marchesano was hired by the Bulldogs two days later.
Cal State Bakersfield	Ari Wideman	—N/a	Ray Alvarado	Wideman announced her resignation on April 14, 2026, over a month after being placed on paid administrative leave, after two seasons at CSUB. Roadrunners assistant coach Alvarado, who was serving as the interim head coach during Wideman's leave and eventual departure, was officially named head coach on July 7.
Cal State Fullerton	John Bonner	—N/a	Sammy Doucette	Bonner left Fullerton on March 19, 2026 after one season for the Seattle job. Doucette, who for the last seven seasons was head coach at Orange Coast College, was hired by the Titans on May 4.
Campbell	Ronny Fisher	—N/a	Ali Jaques	Fisher announced his resignation from Campbell on April 27, 2026, after 10 seasons. Rhode Island associate head coach Jaques was named the new head coach of the Fighting Camels on May 15.
Charleston	Robin Harmony	—N/a	Amanda Butler	Harmony left Charleston on March 23, 2026 after seven seasons for the Pittsburgh head coaching position. Louisville assistant coach Butler, who previously was head coach at Charlotte, Florida, and Clemson, was hired by the Cougars on March 31.
Charleston Southern	Clarisse White	—N/a	Tim Hays	White resigned from CSU on April 14, 2026 after five seasons. On May 5, the Buccaneers hired Hays from NAIA LSU Shreveport.
Cleveland State	Chris Kielsmeier	—N/a	Bob Dunn	Kielsmeier left Cleveland State on March 31, 2026 after eight seasons for Texas State. Penn State assistant coach Dunn, who previously served two separate stints as an assistant with the Vikings, was hired on April 13.
Delaware State	Jazmone Turner	—N/a	Khadijah Rushdan	DSU parted ways with Turner on April 2, 2026 after 2+ years. Rutgers assistant coach and Delaware native Rushdan was hired by the Hornets on April 17.
Denver	Doshia Woods	—N/a	Erik Johnson	Woods and Denver mutually agreed to part ways on March 10, 2026 after six seasons. Fairfield assistant coach Johnson, who was previously head coach of the Pioneers from 2008–2012, was rehired on April 20.
Evansville	Robyn Scherr	—N/a	Ben Wierzba	Scherr resigned from Evansville on March 27, 2026 after five seasons. Miami (OH) associate head coach Wierzba, who was an assistant with the Purple Aces' men's team from 2007–2010, was hired on April 16.
Florida	Kelly Rae Finley	—N/a	Tammi Reiss	Florida parted ways with Finley on March 9, 2026 after five seasons. Rhode Island head coach Reiss was hired by the Gators on March 23.
Fordham	Bridgette Mitchell	—N/a	Neil Harrow	Fordham parted ways with Mitchell on March 16, 2026 after three seasons. LIU head coach Harrow was hired as the Rams' new head coach on April 1.
Georgia	Katie Abrahamson-Henderson	—N/a	Ayla Guzzardo	UGA and Abrahamson-Henderson mutually agreed to part ways on April 4, 2026 after four seasons. McNeese head coach Guzzardo was hired by the Lady Bulldogs the following day.
Georgia Southern	Hana Haden	—N/a	Heather Macy	Haden left Georgia Southern on March 26, 2026 after two seasons for the Memphis job. Heather Macy, head coach at D2 Nova Southeastern this season, was named the Eagles' new head coach on April 3.
Georgia State	Gene Hill	—N/a	Marcilina Grayer	Hill resigned from Georgia State on March 12, 2026 after eight seasons. After a nearly month-long search, the Panthers hired NJCAA Salt Lake Community College head coach Grayer on April 10.
Hawai'i	Laura Beeman	—N/a	Khalilah Mitchell	Beeman announced her retirement on March 30, 2026 after 14 seasons at Hawaii. On April 21, the Rainbow Wahine promoted assistant coach Mitchell to the position.
High Point	Chelsea Banbury	—N/a	Wyatt Foust	Banbury left High Point on March 31, 2026 after seven seasons for VCU. Murray State associate head coach Foust was hired by the Panthers on April 6.
Jacksonville State	Rick Pietri	—N/a	Ricky Austin	Pietri announced his retirement on March 12, 2026 after 13 seasons at Jacksonville State and 26 years overall. On March 30, the Gamecocks hired Ricky Austin, who had been head coach at Spring Garden High School in Spring Garden, Alabama for the last 30 years.
Kansas City	Dionnah Jackson-Durrett	—N/a	Candi Whitaker	Kansas City announced on March 6, 2026 that Jackson-Durrett would not return next season, ending her 4-year tenure. North Alabama head coach Whitaker, who previously served as head coach of the Roos from 2006–2012, was rehired on March 11.
Kennesaw State	Octavia Blue	—N/a	Tianni Kelly	KSU announced on March 11, 2026 that Blue would not return after five seasons as head coach. Chattanooga associate head coach was hired by the Owls on March 30.
Kent State	Todd Starkey	—N/a	Fran Recchia	Starkey left Kent State on March 16, 2026 after 10 seasons to become associate head coach at Arizona and was replaced by Golden Flashes associate head coach Recchia.
Lafayette	Kia Damon-Olson	—N/a	Ben O'Brien	Lafayette announced on March 23, 2026 that Damon-Olson would not return after nine seasons. O'Brien, who won 117 games in four seasons at Division III Scranton, was hired by the Leopards on April 22.
Lindenwood	Amy Eagan	—N/a	Phil Sayers	Eagan left Lindenwood on March 31, 2026 after three seasons for the New Mexico job. Phil Sayers, who won back-to-back NCAA D2 tournaments at Grand Valley State, was hired by the Lions on April 7.
LIU	Neil Harrow	—N/a	Baronton Terry	Harrow left LIU on April 1, 2026 after one season for Fordham. Sharks assistant coach Terry was promoted to the position on April 9.
Long Beach State	Amy Wright	—N/a	Minyon Moore	Wright left LBSU on April 30, 2026, after three seasons to become associate head coach at Alabama. TCU assistant coach Moore was named the new head coach for the Beach on May 19.
Loyola Chicago	Allison Guth	—N/a	Morgan Paige	Guth announced her resignation from Loyola on March 31, 2026 after four seasons and a 50–75 record. Kansas associate head coach Paige was hired by the Ramblers on April 12.
McNeese	Ayla Guzzardo	—N/a	Ashton Feldhaus	Guzzardo left McNeese on April 5, 2026 after one season for the Georgia opening. Morehead State head coach Feldhaus was hired by the Cowgirls two days later.
Memphis	Alex Simmons	—N/a	Hana Haden	Memphis fired Simmons on March 9, 2026 after a 30–61 record in three seasons. Georgia Southern head coach Haden was hired by the Tigers on March 26.
Merrimack	Kelly Morrone	—N/a	Missy Traversi	Morrone left Merrimack on April 4, 2026 after six seasons for the Albany position. Former Army head coach Traversi was hired by the Warriors on April 6.
Middle Tennessee	Rick Insell	—N/a	Matt Insell	Rick Insell announced his retirement on March 28, 2026, effective after the end of his 21st season at MTSU, with his son and Blue Raiders associate head coach Matt named as his successor.
Morehead State	Ashton Feldhaus	—N/a	Jackie Alexander	Feldhaus left Morehead State on April 7, 2026 after one season for the McNeese job. Illinois assistant coach Alexander was hired by the Eagles the following day.
Nevada	Amanda Levens	—N/a	Kelly Sopak	Nevada announced on March 9, 2026 that Levins will not return after nine seasons as head coach. Sopak, an alum of Nevada who was serving as head coach at Carondelet High School in Concord, California, was hired by the Wolf Pack on March 24.
New Mexico	Mike Bradbury	—N/a	Amy Eagan	New Mexico and Bradbury mutually agreed to part ways on March 21, 2026 after ten seasons. Lindenwood head coach Eagan was hired by the Lobos on March 31.
New Mexico State	Jody Adams	—N/a	Adeniyi Amadou	New Mexico State fired Adams on March 8, 2026 after four seasons and a 57–71 record. Rhode Island associate head coach was hired by the Aggies on March 11.
Niagara	Jada Pierce	—N/a	Tiara Johnson	Pierce announced on April 10, 2026 that she was stepping down from her head coaching position after 11 seasons at Niagara. St. Bonaventure associate head coach Johnson was hired by the Purple Eagles on May 19.
Nicholls	Justin Payne	—N/a	Jayln Johnson-Joubert	Payne left Nicholls on April 14, 2026 after three seasons to join the coaching staff at Georgia, where he was named associate head coach. Colonels assistant coach Johnson-Joubert, initially named interim head coach following Payne's departure, was officially promotoed three days later.
North Alabama	Candi Whitaker	—N/a	Anna Nimz	Whitaker left UNA on March 11, 2026 after two seasons to return to Kansas City, where she previously served as head coach from 2006–2012. Northwestern State head coach Nimz was hired by the Lions on March 26.
North Carolina Central	Terrence Baxter	—N/a	Olivia Gaines	NC Central announced on March 16, 2026 that Baxter would not return after three seasons. Gaines, head coach of D2 Allen, was hired by the Eagles on May 8.
Northwestern	Joe McKeown	—N/a	Carla Berube	McKeown announced on March 24, 2025 that he would retire at the end of the 2025–26 season, his 18th at Northwestern. On March 25, 2026, just over a year after McKeown's announcement, Princeton head coach Carla Berube was hired by the Wildcats.
Northwestern State	Anna Nimz	—N/a	Alan Frey	Nimz left Northwestern State on March 26, 2026 after six seasons for the North Alabama job. Frey, assistant coach at NAIA Loyola New Orleans, was named the Lady Demons' new head coach on April 1.
Penn State	Carolyn Kieger	—N/a	Tanisha Wright	Kieger was fired by Penn State on March 5, 2026 after an 84–123 record and no NCAA tournament appearances in seven seasons. Former Lady Lion star player Wright, who was serving as assistant coach for the WNBA's Chicago Sky, was hired on March 19.
Pittsburgh	Tory Verdi	—N/a	Robin Harmony	Pitt fired Verdi, who had been accused by former players of Title IX violations, on March 3, 2026 after three seasons. Charleston head coach Harmony was hired by the Panthers on March 23.
Princeton	Carla Berube	—N/a	Lauren Gosselin	Berube left Princeton on March 25, 2026 after seven seasons for the opening at Northwestern. On April 8, the Tigers promoted associate head coach Gosselin to the position.
Purdue Fort Wayne	Maria Marchesano	—N/a	Kate Peterson Abiad	Marchesano left PFW on April 8, 2026 after five seasons for the head coaching job at her alma mater Butler. Green Bay assistant coach Peterson Abiad, who was head coach at Cleveland State from 2003–2018, was hired by the Mastodons two days later.
Quinnipiac	Tricia Fabbri	—N/a	Roman Owen	On March 16, 2026, Fabbri announced her retirement after 31 seasons at Quinnipiac, effective after the season. She led the Bobcats to 571 wins, including 9 regular season conference titles, and 5 conference championships. UNLV associate head coach Owen was hired on April 7.
Rhode Island	Tammi Reiss	—N/a	Colleen Mullen	Reiss left Rhode Island on March 23, 2026 after seven seasons for the Florida job. Albany head coach Mullen, who played for the Rams from 1998–2000 before transferring to New Hampshire, was hired on March 29.
Richmond	Aaron Roussell	—N/a	Alisa Kresge	Roussell left Richmond on April 7, 2026 after seven seasons for Virginia. Vermont head coach Kresge was named the new head coach of the Spiders on April 11.
Rutgers	Coquese Washington	—N/a	Gary Redus II	Rutgers fired Washington on March 2, 2026 after a 42–84 record in four seasons. LSU assistant coach Redus was hired by the Scarlet Knights exactly one week later.
St. Thomas	Ruth Sinn	—N/a	Mandy Pearson	Sinn, who was in her 21st season as head coach of her alma mater, announced on February 10, 2026 that she will retire at the end of the season. Pearson, head coach of Division II Minnesota Duluth the last 11 seasons, was hired by the Tommies on March 25.
Seattle	Skyler Young	—N/a	John Bonner	Young's contract with Seattle was not renewed on March 2, 2026 after three seasons. Cal State Fullerton head coach Bonner was hired by the Redhawks on March 19.
South Florida	Jose Fernandez	Michele Woods-Baxter	Kristy Curry	Fernandez left USF on October 23, 2025, just 11 days before beginning his 26th season as head coach, to become head coach of the WNBA's Dallas Wings, which became official 4 days later. Bulls associate head coach Woods-Baxter was named interim head coach for the 2025–26 season. After the season, the school hired Alabama head coach Curry on March 24.
Stetson	Lynn Bria	—N/a	Melissa DeVore	Bria announced her departure from her head coaching role at the end of the season on March 16, 2026 after 18 seasons at Stetson. On April 2, the Hatters hired Division II Coker University head coach DeVore.
Texas State	Zenarae Antoine	—N/a	Chris Kielsmeier	Antoine, Texas State's winningest head coach with 225 wins, announced on March 9, 2026 that she was stepping down after 15 seasons. On March 31, the Bobcats hired Cleveland State head coach Kielsmeier as her replacement.
UCF	Sytia Messer	—N/a	Gabe Lazo	UCF fired Messer on March 30, 2026 after a 49–69 record in four seasons. Tennessee assistant coach Lazo was hired by the Knights on April 4.
UMass Lowell	Jon Plefka	—N/a	Brianna Finch	After an 8–21 record in his lone season, Plefka and UMass Lowell mutually agreed to part ways on March 13, 2026. On April 3, the River Hawks hired George Washington assistant coach and recruiting coordinator Finch.
Utah Tech	JD Gustin	—N/a	Adam Wardenburg	Ahead of their move to the Big Sky Conference, Utah Tech parted ways with Gustin on April 2, 2026 after ten seasons. Air Force assistant coach Wardenburg was named as the new Trailblazers head coach on April 20.
VCU	Beth O'Boyle	Kirk Crawford	Chelsea Banbury	VCU announced on February 2, 2026 that O'Boyle, who was in her 12th season as head coach of the program, will not have her contract renewed and that she would be relieved of her duties effective immediately. Rams assistant coach Crawford was named interim head coach for the rest of the season. After the season, the school hired High Point head coach Chelsea Banbury on March 31.
Vermont	Alisa Kresge	—N/a	Maureen Magarity	Kresge left Vermont on April 11, 2026 after eight seasons for Richmond. Two days later, the Catamounts hired former New Hampshire and Holy Cross head coach Magarity. With her husband John Becker having been the UVM men's head coach since 2001, this is the first time a Division I member has had a married couple serve as head coach of both the men's and women's basketball programs.
Virginia	Amaka Agugua-Hamilton	—N/a	Aaron Roussell	Despite leading the Cavaliers to their first sweet sixteen appearance since 2000, UVA fired Agugua-Hamilton on April 4, 2026 after four seasons. Richmond head coach Roussell was hired three days later.

== Attendances ==
The top 30 NCAA Division I women's basketball teams by average home attendance:

== Television viewers and ratings ==
=== Most watched regular season games ===
Rank	Game	Date and time (ET)	Matchup	Network	Viewers (millions)	TV rating
TBD						

=== Most watched conference tournament games ===
Rank	Tournament	Date and time (ET)	Matchup	Network	Viewers (millions)	TV rating
TBD						

=== Most watched tournament games ===
(#) Tournament seedings and region in parentheses.

Rank	Round	Date and time (ET)	Matchup	Network	Viewers (millions)	TV rating
TBD						

== See also ==
- 2025–26 NCAA Division I men's basketball season
