= 2025–26 Middle Tennessee Blue Raiders women's basketball team =

American college basketball season

2025–26 Middle Tennessee Blue Raiders women's basketball

WNIT, Super 16
- Conference: Conference USA
- Record: 17–16 (11–7 C-USA)
- Head coach: Rick Insell (21st season)
- Associate head coach: Matt Insell
- Assistant coaches: Kim Brewton; Nina Davis; Tom Hodges; Shelby Davis
- Home arena: Murphy Center

2025–26 Conference USA women's basketball standings
	Conf.				Overall
Team	W		L	PCT	W		L	PCT
Louisiana Tech	17	–	1	.944	26	–	7	.788
FIU	12	–	6	.667	21	–	12	.636
Middle Tennessee	11	–	7	.611	17	–	16	.515
Sam Houston	11	–	7	.611	18	–	13	.581
Liberty	11	–	7	.611	18	–	13	.581
Missouri State †	11	–	7	.611	23	–	13	.639
Jacksonville State	9	–	9	.500	16	–	16	.500
Delaware	6	–	12	.333	13	–	19	.406
Kennesaw State	6	–	12	.333	13	–	17	.433
UTEP	5	–	13	.278	13	–	17	.433
New Mexico State	5	–	13	.278	9	–	21	.300
Western Kentucky	4	–	14	.222	8	–	21	.276
† 2026 CUSA tournament winner

The 2025–26 Middle Tennessee Blue Raiders women's basketball team represented Middle Tennessee State University during the 2025–26 NCAA Division I women's basketball season. The Blue Raiders, led by 21st-year head coach Rick Insell, played their home games at Murphy Center in Murfreesboro, Tennessee, as members of Conference USA.

== Previous season ==
The Blue Raiders finished the 2024–25 season 26–9, 16–2 in C-USA play, to finish as C-USA co-regular season champions, alongside Liberty. They defeated Kennesaw State and Western Kentucky, before falling to top-seeded Liberty in the C-USA tournament championship game. They received an at-large bid to the WBIT, where they were defeated by eventual tournament runner-up Belmont in the first round.

== Preseason ==
On October 9, 2025, Conference USA released their preseason poll. Middle Tennessee was picked to finish third in the conference, with two first-place votes.

=== Preseason rankings ===
Conference USA Preseason Poll
Place	Team	Votes
1	Louisiana Tech	128 (5)
2	Liberty	125 (5)
3	Middle Tennessee	123 (2)
4	Missouri State	107
5	Western Kentucky	96
6	FIU	74
7	Sam Houston	59
T-8	UTEP	57
T-8	Kennesaw State	57
10	New Mexico State	51
11	Delaware	36
12	Jacksonville State	23
(#) first-place votes

=== Preseason All-CUSA Team ===
Preseason All-CUSA Team
Player	Position	Year
Alayna Contreras	Guard	Senior

== Roster ==
2025–26 Middle Tennessee Blue Raiders women's basketball team
Players
Coaches

Pos.	#	Name	Height	Year	Previous school	Hometown
G	0	Gracie Hamby	5 ft 8 in (1.73 m)	RS Jr	Blackman High School	Murfreesboro, Tennessee
G	1	Yu Han Lin	5 ft 9 in (1.75 m)	Fr	Jinou Girls High School	Hualien, Taiwan
G	3	Alayna Contreras	5 ft 6 in (1.68 m)	Sr	Kansas City	Minneapolis, Minnesota
G	5	Carsyn Swaney	6 ft 0 in (1.83 m)	Fr	Heritage High School	Maryville, Tennessee
G	10	Kirston Verhulst	5 ft 8 in (1.73 m)	Fr	Bishop Miege High School	De Soto, Kansas
G	11	Emily Monson	6 ft 1 in (1.85 m)	Jr	Purdue	Murfreesboro, Tennessee
G	12	Blair Baugus	6 ft 1 in (1.85 m)	Fr	Wayne County High School	Waynesboro, Tennessee
F	13	Jenna McClendon	6 ft 4 in (1.93 m)	Fr	Prattville Christian Academy	Deatsville, Alabama
G	14	Savannah Davis	5 ft 10 in (1.78 m)	So	McKenzie High School	McKenzie, Tennessee
C	15	Nicole Dominguez	6 ft 10 in (2.08 m)	Fr	Segle XXI	Santa Cruz de Tenerife, Spain
G	21	Nora Ahamadi	5 ft 10 in (1.78 m)	Fr	INSEP	Salon-de-Provence, France
G	22	Macie Phifer	6 ft 1 in (1.85 m)	Fr	Ingomar High School	New Albany, Mississippi
G	23	Jada Harrison	5 ft 8 in (1.73 m)	RS So	Westview High School	Martin, Tennessee
F	42	Stanislava Kabernick	6 ft 1 in (1.85 m)	RS So	Olympic Reserve School Number 1	Saint Petersburg, Russia

Head coach

- Rick Insell (Middle Tennessee)

Assistant coach(es)

- Matt Insell (Middle Tennessee)
- Kim Brewton (Liberty)
- Nina Davis (Baylor)
- Tom Hodges (Tennessee Tech)
- Shelby Davis (Middle Tennessee)

Legend

- (C) Team captain
- (S) Suspended
- (I) Ineligible
- (W) Walk-on
- Injured
- Current redshirt

Roster
Last update: February 6, 2026

Weekly awards:

- CUSA Player of the Week:
  - Alayna Contreras (1: W15)
- CUSA Freshmen of the Week:
  - Blair Baugus (7: W1, 2, 5, 7, 9, 12, 13)
  - Yu Han Lin (1: W10)
  - Macie Phifer (3: W6, 15, 16)

== Schedule and results ==
Date time, TV	Rank^{#}	Opponent^{#}	Result	Record	High points	High rebounds	High assists	Site (attendance) city, state
Exhibition
October 26, 2025*; 1:00 pm		Fisk	W 94–39	–	–	–	–	Murphy Center; Murfreesboro, TN
October 28, 2025*; 6:30 pm		Life	W 76–42	–	–	–	–	Murphy Center; Murfreesboro, TN
Non-conference regular season
November 3, 2025*; 10:30 am, ESPN+		Tennessee State	W 59–53	1–0	16 – Davis	12 – Baugus	3 – Lin	Murphy Center (5,876); Murfreesboro, TN
November 6, 2025*; 4:00 pm, ESPN+		at Saint Louis	W 73–55	2–0	23 – Contreras	11 – Baugus	3 – Baugus	Chaifetz Arena (376); St. Louis, MO
November 11, 2025*; 6:00 pm, ESPN+		at Tennessee Tech	L 54–63	2–1	17 – Lin	12 – Baugus	2 – Contreras	Hooper Eblen Center (1,126); Cookeville, TN
November 15, 2025*; 2:00 pm, ESPN+		at Rice	L 59–66	2–2	22 – Baugus	7 – Baugus	2 – Tied	Tudor Fieldhouse (738); Houston, TX
November 20, 2025*; 6:30 pm, ESPN+		No. 15 Tennessee	L 41–85	2–3	18 – Davis	7 – Baugus	2 – Contreras	Murphy Center (10,212); Murfreesboro, TN
November 24, 2025*; 11:00 am, FloSports		vs. Providence; Emerald Coast Classic Bay Bracket semifinals	W 54−48	3−3	22 – Contreras	13 – Baugus	4 – Verhulst	Raider Arena (1,026); Niceville, FL
November 25, 2025*; 1:30 pm, FloSports		vs. Mississippi State; Emerald Coast Classic Bay Bracket championship	L 47−69	3−4	13 – Phifer	9 – Phifer	4 – Verhulst	Raider Arena (750); Niceville, FL
December 3, 2025*; 6:30 pm, ESPN+		Belmont	L 65–71	3–5	21 – Baugus	8 – Verhulst	3 – Lin	Murphy Center (3,378); Murfreesboro, TN
December 7, 2025*; 1:00 pm, ESPN+		Memphis	W 60–51	4–5	20 – Lin	14 – Baugus	2 – Tied	Murphy Center (3,637); Murfreesboro, TN
December 14, 2025*; 2:00 pm, ESPN+		at Southern Indiana	L 59–76	4–6	20 – Phifer	10 – Tied	7 – Lin	Liberty Arena (1,019); Evansville, IN
December 16, 2025*; 6:30 pm, ESPN+		Auburn	L 52–68	4–7	12 – Contreras	7 – Phifer	4 – Contreras	Murphy Center (3,012); Murfreesboro, TN
December 20, 2025*; 2:00 pm, ESPN+		at Wichita State	W 46–45	5–7	10 – Davis	12 – Baugus	3 – Lin	Charles Koch Arena (953); Wichita, KS
C-USA regular season
January 2, 2026; 6:00 pm, ESPN+		at Kennesaw State	W 60−47	6−7 (1–0)	25 – Baugus	10 – Baugus	5 – Contreras	VyStar Arena (577); Kennesaw, GA
January 4, 2026; 2:30 pm, ESPN+		at Jacksonville State	W 69–52	7–7 (2–0)	21 – Contreras	10 – Baugus	6 – Verhulst	Pete Mathews Coliseum (753); Jacksonville, AL
January 8, 2026; 6:30 pm, ESPN+		UTEP	W 86–43	8–7 (3–0)	18 – Lin	11 – Baugus	3 – Baugus	Murphy Center (3,072); Murfreesboro, TN
January 10, 2026; 12:00 pm, ESPN+		New Mexico State	W 88–51	9–7 (4–0)	18 – Contreras	10 – Phifer	4 – Tied	Murphy Center (3,605); Murfreesboro, TN
January 15, 2026; 6:30 pm, ESPN+		at Louisiana Tech	L 48–61	9–8 (4–1)	14 – Lin	6 – Tied	4 – Phifer	Thomas Assembly Center (1,405); Ruston, LA
January 17, 2026; 1:00 pm, ESPN+		at Sam Houston	W 68–67	10–8 (5–1)	22 – Contreras	9 – Baugus	4 – Tied	Bernard Johnson Coliseum (525); Huntsville, TX
January 22, 2026; 6:30 pm, ESPN+		Delaware	L 48–61	10–9 (5–2)	14 – Contreras	9 – Phifer	2 – Phifer	Murphy Center (3,605); Murfreesboro, TN
January 23, 2026; 6:30 pm, ESPN+		Liberty	W 63–54	11–9 (6–2)	22 – Baugus	8 – Baugus	4 – Verhulst	Murphy Center (3,411); Murfreesboro, TN
January 31, 2026; 12:00 pm, ESPN+		Western Kentucky	W 81–58	12–9 (7–2)	25 – Contreras	17 – Baugus	6 – Contreras	Murphy Center (4,006); Murfreesboro, TN
February 5, 2026; 6:30 pm, ESPN+		at Missouri State	L 54–60	12–10 (7–3)	21 – Contreras	5 – Tied	3 – Contreras	Great Southern Bank Arena (2,088); Springfield, MO
February 7, 2026; 12:00 pm, ESPN+		at FIU	L 58–60	12–11 (7–4)	17 – Contreras	8 – Tied	6 – Contreras	Ocean Bank Convocation Center (157); Miami, FL
February 12, 2026; 6:30 pm, ESPN+		Jacksonville State	W 57-48	13-11 (8-4)	17 – Baugus	16 – Baugus	4 – Baugus	Murphy Center (3,572); Murfreesboro, TN
February 14, 2026; 4:00 pm, ESPN+		Kennesaw State	W 71-53	14-11 (9-4)	28 – Contreras	8 – Phifer	4 – Verhulst	Murphy Center (3,812); Murfreesboro, TN
February 21, 2026; 2:00 pm, ESPN+		at Western Kentucky	L 65-70	14-12 (9-5)	21 – Phifer	12 – Baugus	4 – Lin	E. A. Diddle Arena (1,083); Bowling Green, KY
February 26, 2026; 6:00 pm, ESPN+		at Liberty	L 37-65	14-13 (9-6)	18 – Contreras	10 – Baugus	1 – Tied	Liberty Arena (1,035); Lynchburg, VA
February 28, 2026; 4:00 pm, ESPN+		at Delaware	W 67-53	15-13 (10-6)	22 – Phifer	11 – Baugus	4 – Baugus	Bob Carpenter Center (1,216); Newark, DE
March 5, 2026; 6:30 pm, ESPN+		FIU	L 78-80 ^{2OT}	15-14 (10-7)	22 – Contreras	7 – Phifer	4 – Contreras	Murphy Center (3,434); Murfreesboro, TN
March 7, 2026; 2:00 pm, ESPN+		Missouri State	W 86-75	16-14 (11-7)	31 – Contreras	10 – Baugus	3 – Contreras	Murphy Center (3,807); Murfreesboro, TN
C-USA tournament
March 12, 2026; 2:00PM, ESPN+	(3)	vs. (6) Missouri State; CUSA Tournament Quarterfinals	L 66-69	16-15 (11-7)	24 – Contreras	11 – Baugus	2 – Tied	Propst Arena (3,528); Huntsville, AL
WNIT
March 23, 2026; 6:30PM, ESPN+		St. Bonaventure; WNIT Second Round	W 69–50	17–15	20 – Baugus	14 – Baugus	5 – Verhulst	Murphy Center (4,070); Murfreesboro, TN
March 26, 2026; 6:30PM, ESPN+		Cleveland State; WNIT Super 16	L 56–66	17–16	17 – Tied	6 – Baugus	5 – Contreras	Murphy Center (3,986); Murfreesboro, TN
*Non-conference game. ^{#}Rankings from AP Poll. (#) Tournament seedings in parentheses. All times are in Central.
