= 2025–26 Western Illinois Leathernecks women's basketball team =

American college basketball season

2025–26 Western Illinois Leathernecks women's basketball
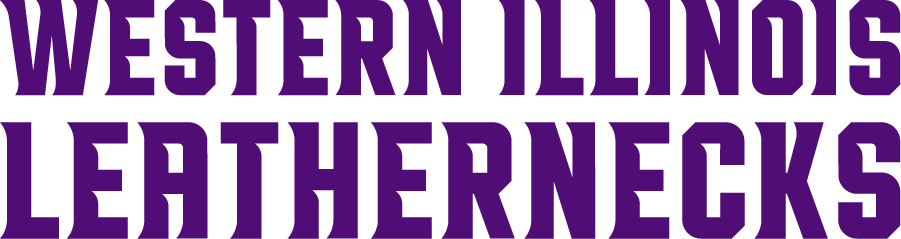

OVC regular-season co-champions and tournament champions

NCAA tournament, first round
- Conference: Ohio Valley Conference
- Record: 26–6 (16–4 OVC)
- Head coach: JD Gravina (15th season)
- Associate head coach: Dan Chapla
- Assistant coaches: Alexa Tovella; Olivia Travis
- Home arena: Western Hall

2025–26 Ohio Valley Conference women's basketball standings
	Conf.				Overall
Team	W		L	PCT	W		L	PCT
Western Illinois †	16	–	4	.800	26	–	6	.813
Lindenwood	16	–	4	.800	25	–	8	.758
Southern Indiana	14	–	6	.700	21	–	10	.677
Morehead State	13	–	7	.650	18	–	15	.545
Little Rock	11	–	9	.550	15	–	15	.500
UT Martin	9	–	11	.450	13	–	17	.433
SIU Edwardsville	8	–	12	.400	16	–	16	.500
Southeast Missouri State	8	–	12	.400	14	–	18	.438
Tennessee Tech	8	–	12	.400	15	–	14	.517
Tennessee State	4	–	16	.200	5	–	24	.172
Eastern Illinois	3	–	17	.150	4	–	27	.129
† 2026 OVC tournament winner

The 2025–26 Western Illinois Leathernecks women's basketball team represented Western Illinois University during the 2025–26 NCAA Division I women's basketball season. The Leathernecks, who are led by 15th-year head coach JD Gravina, played their home games at Western Hall in Macomb, Illinois, as third-year members of the Ohio Valley Conference (OVC).

The Leathernecks finished the season 26–6, 16–4 in OVC play, to finish in first place. In the OVC tournament, they defeated eight seed Southeast Missouri State in the semifinals and beat second-seeded Lindenwood in the championship game. In the NCAA tournament, the Leathernecks lost to North Carolina in the first round.

== Previous season ==
The Leathernecks finished the 2024–25 season 17–17, 8–12 in OVC play, to finish in seventh place. In the OVC tournament, they defeated UT Martin in the first round and Eastern Illinois in the quarterfinals before losing to Lindenwood in the semifinals. They received an invitation of the WNIT where they defeated Lipscomb in the first round before losing to Illinois State in the second round.

== Preseason ==
On October 14, 2025, the OVC released their preseason coaches poll. Western Illinois was picked to finish third in the OVC regular season, receiving four of the 22 first-place votes.

=== Preseason rankings ===
OVC preseason poll
Predicted finish	Team	Votes (1st place)
1	Southern Indiana	179 (22)
2	Tennessee Tech	175 (12)
3	Western Illinois	166 (4)
4	Southern Indiana	147
5	Eastern Illinois	121
6	UT Martin	117
7	Little Rock	110
8	Tennessee State	78
9	Southeast Missouri State	51
T-8	Morehead State	33
T-8	SIU Edwardsville	33

=== Watch List ===
Each OVC team selected two "Watch List" for their team.

Players to Watch
Player	Position	Year
Addi Brownfield	Guard	Senior
Allie Meadows	Guard	Senior

== Roster ==
2025–26 Western Illinois Leathernecks women's basketball team
Players
Coaches

Pos.	#	Name	Height	Year	Previous school	Hometown
G	1	Madison Davis	5 ft 10 in (1.78 m)	So	Marian Catholic HS	Flossmoor, IL
G	2	Shelby Bowman	5 ft 6 in (1.68 m)	So	West Central HS	Biggsville, IL
G	4	Allie Meadows	5 ft 8 in (1.73 m)	Sr	Central DeWitt HS	DeWitt, IA
F	5	Maria Messling	6 ft 0 in (1.83 m)	RS So	Evansville HS	Evansville, WI
G	10	Mallory McDermott (5Y)	5 ft 8 in (1.73 m)	GS	Cedar Rapids Prairie HS	Fairfax, IA
G	12	Raegan McCowan	5 ft 11 in (1.8 m)	Jr	Lebanon HS	Lebanon, MO
G	13	Addi Brownfield	5 ft 9 in (1.75 m)	Sr	Boonville HS	Boonville, MO
G	14	Ainsley Holthaus	5 ft 4 in (1.63 m)	Jr	Macomb HS	Macomb, IL
G/F	20	Kennedy Herrig	5 ft 10 in (1.78 m)	RS Fr	Liberty North HS	Liberty, MO
G/F	22	Mia Nicastro	6 ft 2 in (1.88 m)	Sr	Saint Louis	St. Charles, MO
F	24	Sidney Skrobot	6 ft 1 in (1.85 m)	Fr	Lo-Ellen Park Secondary School	Sudbury, ON
G	32	Kaylen Reed	5 ft 5 in (1.65 m)	Jr	Rochester HS	Rochester, IL
F	44	Katelyn Eggena	6 ft 1 in (1.85 m)	RS Fr	Waverly-Shell Rock HS	Waverly, IA

Head coach

- JD Gravina (William Jewell)

Assistant coach(es)

- Dan Chapla (Ottawa)
- Alexa Tovella (Barton)
- Olivia Travis (Oklahoma Christian)

Legend

- (C) Team captain
- (S) Suspended
- (I) Ineligible
- (W) Walk-on
- (5Y) Fifth-year senior
- Injured
- Current redshirt

Roster
Last update: March 9, 2026

== Schedule and results ==
Date time, TV	Rank^{#}	Opponent^{#}	Result	Record	Site (attendance) city, state
Exhibition
October 28, 2025*; 7:00 p.m.		Quincy	W 61–43		Western Hall (400); Macomb, IL
Non-conference regular season
November 4, 2025*; 7:00 p.m., ESPN+		Westminster College (MO)	W 116–46	1–0	Western Hall (883); Macomb, IL
November 11, 2025*; 6:00 p.m., ESPN+		at Northern Illinois	W 68–50	2–0	Convocation Center (313); DeKalb, IL
November 17, 2025*; 5:00 p.m., ESPN+		Chicago State	W 86–75	3–0	Western Hall (300); Macomb, IL
November 20, 2025*; 7:00 p.m., ESPN+		Bradley	W 84–77	4–0	Western Hall (679); Macomb, IL
November 26, 2025*; 6:30 p.m., B1G+		at No. 11 Iowa	L 69–86	4–1	Carver–Hawkeye Arena (14,998); Iowa City, IA
December 4, 2025*; 11:00 a.m., ESPN+		St. Francis (IL)	W 90–55	5–1	Western Hall (3,167); Macomb, IL
December 7, 2025*; 2:00 p.m., ESPN+		at Drake	W 80–74	6–1	Knapp Center (2,081); Des Moines, IA
December 4, 2025*; 11:00 a.m., ESPN+		Columbia College (MO)	W 75–37	7–1	Western Hall (669); Macomb, IL
December 13, 2025*; 1:00 p.m., ESPN+		Omaha	W 90–41	8–1	Western Hall (164); Macomb, IL
OVC regular season
December 18, 2025; 5:00 p.m., ESPN+		at Lindenwood	W 74–65	9–1 (1–0)	Robert F. Hyland Arena (714); St. Charles, MO
December 22, 2025; 1:00 p.m., ESPN+		SIU Edwardsville	W 74–65	10–1 (2–0)	Western Hall (1,235); Macomb, IL
January 1, 2026; 1:00 p.m., ESPN+		at UT Martin	L 78–86 ^{2OT}	10–2 (2–1)	Skyhawk Arena (1,032); Martin, TN
January 1, 2026; 1:30 p.m., ESPN+		at Southeast Missouri State	W 58–51	11–2 (3–1)	Show Me Center (497); Cape Girardeau, MO
January 8, 2026; 5:00 p.m., ESPN+		Tennessee State	W 76–59	12–2 (4–1)	Western Hall (872); Macomb, IL
January 10, 2026; 1:00 p.m., ESPN+		Tennessee Tech	W 77–60	13–2 (5–1)	Western Hall (987); Macomb, IL
January 13, 2026; 5:00 p.m., ESPN+		at Eastern Illinois	W 74–61	14–2 (6–1)	Groniger Arena (545); Charleston, IL
January 17, 2026; 5:00 p.m., ESPN+		at Little Rock	W 75–59	15–2 (7–1)	Jack Stephens Center; Little Rock, AR
January 22, 2026; 4:00 p.m., ESPN+		at Morehead State	L 53–63	15–3 (7–2)	Ellis Johnson Arena (817); Morehead, KY
January 23, 2026; 5:00 p.m., ESPN+		at Southern Indiana	W 72–62	16–3 (8–2)	Liberty Arena (658); Evansville, IN
January 29, 2026; 5:00 p.m., ESPN+		Southeast Missouri State	W 69–55	17–3 (9–2)	Western Hall; Macomb, IL
January 31, 2026; 5:00 p.m., ESPN+		UT Martin	W 80–54	18–3 (10–2)	Western Hall (1,478); Macomb, IL
February 5, 2026; 5:30 p.m., ESPN+		at Tennessee Tech	W 68–53	19–3 (11–2)	Hooper Eblen Center (910); Cookeville, TN
February 7, 2026; 5:30 p.m., ESPN+		at Tennessee State	L 77–87	19–4 (11–3)	Gentry Center (239); Nashville, TN
February 10, 2026; 5:00 p.m., ESPN+		Eastern Illinois	W 93–49	20–4 (12–3)	Western Hall (910); Macomb, IL
February 12, 2026; 5:00 p.m., ESPN+		Little Rock	W 84–73	21–4 (13–3)	Western Hall (853); Macomb, IL
February 19, 2026; 5:00 p.m., ESPN+		Southern Indiana	W 64–39	22–4 (14–3)	Western Hall (1,083); Macomb, IL
February 21, 2026; 5:00 p.m., ESPN+		Morehead State	W 74–53	23–4 (15–3)	Western Hall (1,083); Macomb, IL
February 26, 2026; 5:00 p.m., ESPN+		at SIU Edwardsville	W 79–61	24–4 (16–3)	First Community Arena (1,496); Edwardsville, IL
February 28, 2026; 1:00 p.m., ESPN+		Lindenwood	L 49–50	24–5 (16–4)	Western Hall (1,657); Macomb, IL
OVC tournament
March 6, 2026; 1:00 p.m., ESPN+	(1)	vs. (8) Southeast Missouri State; Semifinals	W 74–66	25–5	Ford Center; Evansville, IN
March 7, 2026; 3:00 p.m., ESPN+	(1)	vs. (2) Lindenwood; Championship	W 71–65	26–5	Ford Center (922); Evansville, IN
NCAA tournament
March 20, 2026*; 4:30 p.m., ESPNews	(13 FW1)	at (4 FW1) No. 15 North Carolina; First round	L 51–82	26–6	Carmichael Arena (2,390); Chapel Hill, NC
*Non-conference game. ^{#}Rankings from AP poll. (#) Tournament seedings in parentheses. Fort Worth 1=FW1. All times are in Central.
