= Belmont Bruins women's basketball =

Belmont Bruins
2025–26 Belmont Bruins women's basketball team
- University: Belmont University
- Head coach: Bart Brooks (9th season)
- Location: Nashville, Tennessee
- Arena: Curb Event Center (capacity: 5,085)
- Conference: Missouri Valley Conference
- Nickname: Bruins
- Colors: Navy, white, and red

NCAA Division I tournament second round
- 2021, 2022

NCAA Division I tournament appearances
- 2007, 2016, 2017, 2018, 2019, 2021, 2022

Conference tournament champions
- A-Sun: 2007; OVC: 2016, 2017, 2018, 2019, 2021, 2022

Conference regular-season champions
- A-Sun: 2006, 2007; OVC: 2017, 2018, 2019, 2022; MVC: 2023

Conference division champions
- 2014

Uniforms
Home	Away

The Belmont Bruins women's basketball team represents Belmont University in Nashville, Tennessee. They currently play in the Missouri Valley Conference. On April 24, 2017, former DePaul assistant coach Bart Brooks was introduced as the new Bruins' head coach.

== History ==
Belmont began play in 1968, with Division I play beginning in 1997. They have won six conference regular-season titles (two in the ASUN Conference and four in the OVC, with an additional OVC division title) and the conference tournament seven times (ASUN once, OVC six times). They have made the NCAA Tournament seven times, along with three WNIT appearances, one WBIT appearance and four NAIA Tournament appearances. As of the end of the 2023-2024 season, the Bruins have an all-time record of 1,083-563 and a Division I record of 526-298.

== Season-by-season results ==
Sources:

- Belmont record book
- Missouri Valley Conference records
- ASUN Conference Women’s Basketball Record Book

Statistics overview
Season	Team	Overall	Conference	Standing	Postseason
Betty Wiseman () (1968–1984)
1968–69	Betty Wiseman	3–7			
1969–70	Betty Wiseman	17–2			
1970–71	Betty Wiseman	14–7			
1971–72	Betty Wiseman	11–4			
1972–73	Betty Wiseman	14–8			
1973–74	Betty Wiseman	22–6			
1974–75	Betty Wiseman	23–3			
1975–76	Betty Wiseman	19–6			
1976–77	Betty Wiseman	14–8			
1977–78	Betty Wiseman	9–15			
1978–79	Betty Wiseman	15–15			
1979–80	Betty Wiseman	10–19			
1980–81	Betty Wiseman	24–10			
1981-82	Betty Wiseman	16–13			
1982-83	Betty Wiseman	21–13			
1983-84	Betty Wiseman	15–15			
Betty Wiseman:		247–151			
Tony Cross (Volunteer State Athletic Conference) (1984–1985)
1984-85	Tony Cross	14–16			
Tony Cross:		14–16			
Tony Cross (Tennessee Collegiate Athletic Conference) (1985–2001)
1985–86	Tony Cross	17–15			
1986–87	Tony Cross	23–8			
1987–88	Tony Cross	24–6			
1988–89	Tony Cross	21–11			
1989–90	Tony Cross	28–4			
1990–91	Tony Cross	32–5			
1991–92	Tony Cross	29–7			
1992–93	Tony Cross	23–10			
1993–94	Tony Cross	32–3			
1994–95	Tony Cross	21–11			
1995–96	Tony Cross	26–8			
1996–97	Tony Cross	20–10			
1997–98	Tony Cross	16–10			
1998–99	Tony Cross	19–8			
1999-00	Tony Cross	20–8			
2000–01	Tony Cross	14–14			
Tony Cross:		365–138			
Tony Cross (ASUN Conference) (2001–2010)
2001–02	Tony Cross	19–9	13–7	2nd	
2002–03	Tony Cross	19–10	9–7	2nd	
2003–04	Tony Cross	16–12	14–6	1st	
2004–05	Tony Cross	17–11	12–8	T-2nd	
2005–06	Tony Cross	22–8	17–3	1st	
2006–07	Tony Cross	25–7	16–2	1st	NCAA First Round
2007–08	Tony Cross	14–16	8–8	T-5th	
2008–09	Tony Cross	18–13	12–8	4th	
2009–10	Tony Cross	15–15	9–11	T-5th	
Tony Cross:		165–101	110–60		
Tony Cross:		544–255			
Brittney Ezell (ASUN Conference) (2010–2013)
2010–11	Brittney Ezell	11–20	7–13	8th	
2011–12	Brittney Ezell	12–18	11–7	3rd	
Brittney Ezell:		23–38	18–20		
(Ohio Valley Conference) (–present)
2012–13	Brittney Ezell	18–14	11–5	T- 2nd East	First Round
Brittney Ezell:		18–14	11–5		
Cameron Newbauer (Ohio Valley Conference) (2013–2017)
2013–14	Cameron Newbauer	14–18	10–6	2nd	First Round
2014–15	Cameron Newbauer	14–17	10–6	5th	
2015–16	Cameron Newbauer	24–9	13–3	2nd	NCAA First Round
2016–17	Cameron Newbauer	27–6	18–0	1st	NCAA First Round
Cameron Newbauer:		79–50	51–15		
Bart Brooks (Ohio Valley Conference) (2017–2022)
2017–18	Bart Brooks	31–4	18–0	1st	NCAA First Round
2018–19	Bart Brooks	26–7	16–2	1st	NCAA First Round
2019–20	Bart Brooks	22–9	16–2	T-1st	Cancelled
2020–21	Bart Brooks	21–6	14–3	2nd	NCAA Second Round
2021–22	Bart Brooks	23–8	16–2	1st	NCAA Second Round
Bart Brooks:		123–34	80–9		
Bart Brooks (Missouri Valley Conference) (2022–present)
2022–23	Bart Brooks	23–12	17–3	T-1st	WNIT First Round
2023-24	Bart Brooks	26–8	17–3	2nd	WBIT Second Round
2024-25	Bart Brooks	26–12	15–5	T-3rd	WBIT Runner-Up
Bart Brooks:		75–32	49–11		
Total:					
National champion Postseason invitational champion Conference regular season champion Conference regular season and conference tournament champion Division regular season champion Division regular season and conference tournament champion Conference tournament champion

== Postseason results ==
=== NCAA Division I ===
The Bruins have made the NCAA Division I women's basketball tournament seven times, and have an overall record of 2–7.

Year	Seed	Round	Opponent	Result
2007	#14	First Round	#3 Georgia	L 36−53
2016	#13	First Round	#4 Michigan State	L 60−74
2017	#13	First Round	#4 Kentucky	L 70−73
2018	#12	First Round	#5 Duke	L 58−72
2019	#13	First Round	#4 South Carolina	L 52−74
2021	#12	First Round; Second Round	#5 Gonzaga #4 Indiana	W 64−59; L 48−70
2022	#12	First Round; Second Round	#5 Oregon #4 Tennessee	W 73−70; L 67-70

=== NAIA Division I ===
The Bruins, then known as the Rebels, made the NAIA Division I women's basketball tournament four times, with a combined record of 6–4.

Year	Seed	Round	Opponent	Result
1991	#10	First Round; Second Round; Quarterfinals	NR Holy Family #7 Mount Mercy #2 SW Oklahoma State	W, 85–60; W, 99–83; L, 65–70 (OT)
1992	#10	First Round; Second Round; Quarterfinals	NR Minnesota Duluth #7 Saint Ambrose #2 Arkansas Tech	W, 67–65; W, 78–62; L, 65–88
1994	#3	First Round; Second Round; Quarterfinals	NR Mary Hardin-Baylor #14 Phillips (OK) #6 Montevallo	W, 92–72; W, 80–66; L, 71–83
1996	#15	First Round	NR Mary-Hardin Baylor	L, 90–94 (2OT)

=== WNIT ===
Year	Round	Opponent	Result
2006	Round 1	Tennessee Tech	L 56–55
2014	Round 1	Indiana	L 48–47
2023	Round 1	Ball State	L 101–86

== Notable players ==
- Alysha Clark (born 1987), American-Israeli basketball player. Completed her college career at Middle Tennessee.
