= Austin Peay Governors women's basketball =

2026–27 Austin Peay Governors women's basketball team
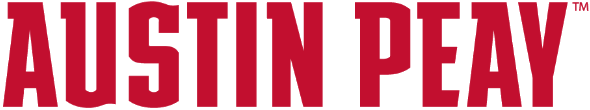
- University: Austin Peay State University
- Head coach: Brittany Young (6th season)
- Location: Clarksville, Tennessee
- Arena: F&M Bank Arena (capacity: 5,500)
- Conference: UAC
- Nickname: Governors
- Colors: Red and white

NCAA Division I tournament appearances
- 1996, 2001, 2002, 2003, 2004, 2009, 2010

Conference tournament champions
- Ohio Valley Conference; 1996, 2001, 2002, 2003, 2004, 2009, 2010

Uniforms
Home	Away

The Austin Peay Governors women's basketball team represents Austin Peay State University (aka Peay) in Clarksville, Tennessee. The Governors currently compete in the United Athletic Conference, having played in the Ohio Valley Conference until the 2021–22 season.

The 2022–23 season was not only Peay's first in the ASUN Conference, but also was its last at the Winfield Dunn Center. After that season, the Governors moved to the new F&M Bank Arena in downtown Clarksville. The new arena was originally intended to open for the 2022–23 season, but was delayed to July 2023.

== History ==
Historically, Peay's women's teams had been known as "Lady Govs", but the university began using "Governors" for women's teams in 2015–16.

As of the end of the 2015–16 season, the Governors have an all-time record of 459–669 since records were kept in 1976. They had played from 1929 to 1936 and had started play again in 1970, but those records are lost. The Govs have made the NCAA Tournament seven times, losing in the First Round each time.

== NCAA tournament results ==
The Governors have made the NCAA Division I women's basketball tournament seven times. They have a combined record of 0–7.

Year	Seed	Round	Opponent	Result
1996	#14	First Round	#3 Clemson	L 52–79
2001	#16	First Round	#1 Tennessee	L 38–90
2002	#15	First Round	#1 Purdue	L 49–80
2003	#14	First Round	#3 North Carolina	L 70–72
2004	#13	First Round	#4 LSU	L 66–83
2009	#16	First Round	#1 Duke	L 42–83
2010	#16	First Round	#1 Tennessee	L 42–75

== Players ==
=== Retired numbers ===
The Governors have retired two women's basketball numbers in their history.

Austin Peay Governors retired numbers
No.	Player	Position	Career
10	Brooke Armistead	G	1999–2003
52	Gerlonda Hardin	F	2000–2004
