= Southeast Missouri State Redhawks women's basketball =

Women's college basketball team at Southeast Missouri State University

Southeast Missouri State Redhawks
2026–27 Southeast Missouri State Redhawks women's basketball team
- University: Southeast Missouri State University
- Head coach: Briley Palmer (3rd season)
- Location: Cape Girardeau, Missouri
- Arena: Show Me Center (capacity: 7,373)
- Conference: Ohio Valley
- Nickname: Redhawks
- Colors: Red and black

NCAA Division I tournament runner-up
- Division II: 1991
Other NCAA Division I tournament results
Final Four	1991
Elite Eight	1991
Appearances	Division I: 2007; Division II: 1983, 1984, 1986, 1987, 1988, 1989, 1990, 1991

AIAW tournament appearances
- Division II: 1980

Conference tournament champions
- MIAA: 1987, 1991; OVC: 2007, 2020

The Southeast Missouri State Redhawks women's basketball team, also formerly known as the Southeast Missouri State Otahkians, represents Southeast Missouri State University in Cape Girardeau, Missouri. The school's team currently competes in the Ohio Valley Conference.

== History ==
Southeast Missouri State began play in 1975, with Division I play beginning in 1991. They finished as runner up to North Dakota State in the 1991 NCAA Division II women's basketball tournament, losing 81–74. The Redhawks have an all-time record of 586–522 and a Division I record of 310–262 as of the end of 2015–16 season. They have been to the NCAA Tournament twice and the WNIT once. They have won the OVC title officially twice, as they won the 2007 and 2020 titles. They vacated the 2006 title due to NCAA sanctions. In 2020, the Redhawks won the Ohio Valley Conference title, gaining an automatic bid into the 2020 NCAA Women’s Basketball Tournament. However, due to the COVID-19 pandemic, the tournament was cancelled.

== Postseason results ==
=== NCAA Division I tournament ===
Year	Seed	Round	Opponent	Result
2007	#14	First Round	#3 Oklahoma	L 60–74

=== NCAA Division II tournament ===
The Redhawks, then known as the Otahkians, made eight appearances in the NCAA Division II women's basketball tournament. They had a combined record of 6–8.

Year	Round	Opponent	Result
1983	Regional Finals	Central Missouri State	L 50–71
1984	First Round; Regional Finals	Howard Payne; Central Missouri State	W 88–50; L 64–76
1986	First Round; Regional Finals	Alaska Anchorage; Central Missouri State	W 80–65; L 64–65
1987	First Round	Central Missouri State	L 62–64
1988	First Round	West Texas State	L 61–64
1989	First Round	West Texas State	L 70–83 (2OT)
1990	First Round	Central Missouri State	L 68–79
1991	First Round; Regional Finals; Elite Eight; Final Four; National Championship	Central Missouri State; West Texas A&M; Cal Poly Pomona; Norfolk State; North Dakota State	W 80–65; W 71–70; W 82–52; W 85–52; L 74–81

=== AIAW College Division/Division II tournament ===
The Redhawks, then known as the Otahkians, made one appearance in the AIAW National Division II basketball tournament, with a combined record of 0–1.

Year	Round	Opponent	Result
1980	First Round	Lenoir-Rhyne	L 63–80
