= Southern Indiana Screaming Eagles women's basketball =

2026–27 Southern Indiana Screaming Eagle women's basketball team
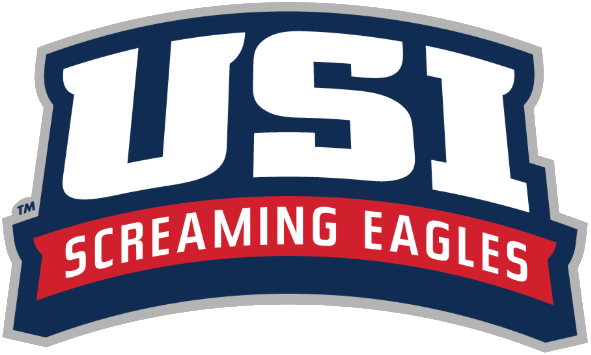
- University: University of Southern Indiana
- Head coach: Rick Stein (26th season)
- Location: Evansville, Indiana
- Arena: Screaming Eagles Arena (capacity: 4,800)
- Conference: Ohio Valley Conference
- Nickname: Screaming Eagles
- Colors: Blue, white, and red

NCAA Division I tournament runner-up
- Division II: 1997
Other NCAA Division I tournament results
Final Four	Division II: 1997
Elite Eight	Division II: 1997, 2001
Sweet Sixteen	Division II: 1997, 2001, 2002
Appearances	Division II: 1995, 1996, 1997, 1998, 2001, 2002, 2004, 2010, 2015, 2018, 2020, 2022

Conference tournament champions
- OVC: 2024; GLVC: 1998, 2001, 2002

Conference regular-season champions
- OVC: 2024

The Southern Indiana Screaming Eagles women's basketball team represents the University of Southern Indiana in Evansville, Indiana, United States. The Screaming Eagles currently compete in the NCAA Division I Ohio Valley Conference, having started a transition from Division II on July 1, 2022. Under NCAA rules for reclassifying programs, the Screaming Eagles will not be eligible to compete in the NCAA tournament until the 2026–27 season. The Screaming Eagles will be eligible to play in the WNIT, which unlike its men's counterpart is not operated by the NCAA.

The team is currently led by twenty-three-year head coach Rick Stein and play their home games at Screaming Eagles Arena.

== Postseason appearances ==
=== NCAA Division II ===
During their time in NCAA Division II, the Screaming Eagles were selected to play in the NCAA Division II women's basketball tournament twelve times. They were selected for the 2020 tournament, but it was not held due to the cancellation of the tournament with the COVID-19 pandemic. They had a combined record of 8–11.

Year	Round	Opponent	Result
1995	Regional Semifinals	Oakland	L 69–88
1996	First Round; Regional Semifinals	Oakland; Bellarmine	W 84–83; L 80–89
1997	Regional Semifinals; Regional Finals; Elite Eight; Final Four; National Championship	Michigan Tech; Northern Michigan; Delta State; UC Davis; North Dakota	W 66–48; W 78–67; W 70–55; W 70–62; L 78–94
1998	Regional Semifinals	Michigan Tech	L 92–94 (2OT)
2001	Regional Semifinals; Regional Finals; Elite Eight	Gannon; Northern Michigan; Columbus State	W 84–79; W 86–77; L 73–79
2002	Regional Semifinals; Regional Finals	Hillsdale; Northern Kentucky	W 84–63; L 66–69
2004	First Round	Lake Superior State	L 86–100
2010	First Round	Drury	L 48–71
2015	First Round	Ashland	L 61–81
2018	First Round	Lewis	L 64–72
2020	First Round	Ashland	N/A
2022	First Round	Walsh	L 63–75

== See also ==
- Southern Indiana Screaming Eagles
- Southern Indiana Screaming Eagles men's basketball
