= Morehead State Eagles women's basketball =

Morehead State Eagles
2026–27 Morehead State Eagles women's basketball team
- University: Morehead State University
- Head coach: Jackie Alexander (1st season)
- Location: Morehead, Kentucky
- Arena: Ellis Johnson Arena (capacity: 6,500)
- Conference: Ohio Valley
- Nickname: Eagles
- Colors: Blue and gold

Conference tournament champions
- 1979

The Morehead State Eagles women's basketball team is the women's basketball team that represents Morehead State University in Morehead, Kentucky, United States. The team currently competes in the Ohio Valley Conference. They are one of 63 schools to have never appeared in the NCAA Division I women's basketball tournament.

== History ==
Morehead State began play in 1970. They joined the Ohio Valley Conference (OVC) in 1977. They won the Ohio Valley Conference women's basketball tournament in 1979, finishing off a year in which they went 28-4 (and 8–1 in OVC play). They have made the postseason in 2010 (WBI) and 2017 (WNIT). As of the end of the 2015–16 season, the Eagles had an all-time record of 542–632.
