= Lindenwood Lions women's basketball =

Lindenwood Lions
2026–27 Lindenwood Lions women's basketball team
- University: Lindenwood University
- Head coach: Phil Sayers (1st season)
- Location: St. Charles, Missouri
- Arena: Robert F. Hyland Performance Arena (capacity: 3,270)
- Conference: Ohio Valley Conference
- Nickname: Lions
- Colors: Black and gold

NCAA Division I tournament appearances
- 2018*, 2019*

Conference tournament champions
- MIAA: 2018

Conference regular-season champions
- OVC: 2026
- * Division II

The Lindenwood Lions women's basketball team represents Lindenwood University in St. Charles, Missouri, United States. The Lions currently compete in the Division I Ohio Valley Conference. They formerly played in the Mid-America Intercollegiate Athletics Association from 2012 to 2019 and the Great Lakes Valley Conference from 2019 to 2022. Due to the NCAA's policy on reclassifying programs, the Lions will not be eligible to compete in the NCAA tournament until the 2026–27 season. The Lions will be eligible to play in the WNIT, which unlike its men's counterpart is not operated by the NCAA.

The team is currently led by first-year head coach Phil Sayers and play their home games at Robert F. Hyland Performance Arena.

== Postseason ==
=== NCAA Division II ===
The Lions made two appearances in the NCAA Division II women's basketball tournament, with a combined record of 0–2. They were invited to the 2020 NCAA Division II Tournament, but that tournament was never played.

Year	Round	Opponent	Result
2018	First Round	Augustana (SD)	L 41-75
2019	First Round	Central Missouri	L 64-76

=== NAIA Division I ===
The Lions made three appearances in the NAIA Division I women's basketball tournament, with a combined record of 0–3.

Year	Seed	Round	Opponent	Result
1994	NR	First Round	#7 David Lipscomb	L, 59–89
1995	NR	First Round	#4 Union (TN)	L, 53–79
1996	NR	First Round	#5 Lipscomb	L, 60–86

== See also ==
- Lindenwood Lions men's basketball
