= Beth Cunningham =

Beth Cunningham may refer to:

- Beth A. Cunningham, American physicist
- Beth Cunningham (basketball) (born 1975), American basketball player and coach
