= 2025–26 Missouri State Lady Bears basketball team =

American college basketball season

2025–26 Missouri State Lady Bears basketball

CUSA tournament champions

NCAA tournament, First Round
- Conference: Conference USA
- Record: 23–13 (11–7 C-USA)
- Head coach: Beth Cunningham (4th season)
- Assistant coaches: Olivia Malcolm; Jay Spoonhour; Abby Emmert; Jordan Chavis
- Home arena: Great Southern Bank Arena

2025–26 Conference USA women's basketball standings
	Conf.				Overall
Team	W		L	PCT	W		L	PCT
Louisiana Tech	17	–	1	.944	26	–	7	.788
FIU	12	–	6	.667	21	–	12	.636
Middle Tennessee	11	–	7	.611	17	–	16	.515
Sam Houston	11	–	7	.611	18	–	13	.581
Liberty	11	–	7	.611	18	–	13	.581
Missouri State †	11	–	7	.611	23	–	13	.639
Jacksonville State	9	–	9	.500	16	–	16	.500
Delaware	6	–	12	.333	13	–	19	.406
Kennesaw State	6	–	12	.333	13	–	17	.433
UTEP	5	–	13	.278	13	–	17	.433
New Mexico State	5	–	13	.278	9	–	21	.300
Western Kentucky	4	–	14	.222	8	–	21	.276
† 2026 CUSA tournament winner

The 2025–26 Missouri State Lady Bears basketball team represents Missouri State University during the 2025–26 NCAA Division I women's basketball season. The Lady Bears, led by fourth-year head coach Beth Cunningham, play their home games at the Great Southern Bank Arena in Springfield, Missouri as first-year members of Conference USA.

== Previous season ==
The Lady Bears finished the 2024–25 season 26–9, 16–4 in MVC play, to finish as MVC regular season co-champions, alongside Murray State. They defeated UIC, before falling to Belmont in the semifinals of the MVC tournament. They received an at-large bid to the WBIT, where they would defeat Oral Roberts in the first round, before falling to eventual tournament champions Minnesota in the second round.

== Preseason ==
On October 9, 2025, Conference USA released their preseason poll. Missouri State was picked to finish fourth in the conference.

=== Preseason rankings ===
Conference USA Preseason Poll
Place	Team	Votes
1	Louisiana Tech	128 (5)
2	Liberty	125 (5)
3	Middle Tennessee	123 (2)
4	Missouri State	107
5	Western Kentucky	96
6	FIU	74
7	Sam Houston	59
T-8	UTEP	57
T-8	Kennesaw State	57
10	New Mexico State	51
11	Delaware	36
12	Jacksonville State	23
(#) first-place votes

=== Preseason All-CUSA Team ===
Preseason All-CUSA Team
Player	Position	Year
Faith Lee	Forward	Senior

== Roster ==
2025–26 Missouri State Lady Bears women's basketball team
Players
Coaches

Pos.	#	Name	Height	Year	Previous school	Hometown
G	0	Victoria Dixon	5 ft 5 in (1.65 m)	Sr	Houston Christian	Grand Prairie, Texas
G	1	JaNyla Bush	5 ft 3 in (1.6 m)	RS Fr	Link Academy	St. Louis, Missouri
F	2	Lainie Douglas	6 ft 3 in (1.91 m)	So	Blue Valley Northwest High School	Overland Park, Kansas
G	3	Kendal Brueggen	5 ft 10 in (1.78 m)	Fr	Hesston High School	Hesston, Kansas
G	5	Zoe Canfield	5 ft 11 in (1.8 m)	So	Kansas	Topeka, Kansas
F	11	Faith Lee	5 ft 11 in (1.8 m)	Sr	Little Rock	Monroe, Louisiana
F	12	Tyra Robinson	6 ft 3 in (1.91 m)	Jr	Western Carolina	Little Rock, Arkansas
G	13	Maycee James	5 ft 7 in (1.7 m)	Sr	Pittsburg State	Goddard, Kansas
F	15	Maiesha Washington	6 ft 0 in (1.83 m)	Fr	Legion Prep Academy	Fayetteville, Arkansas
G	20	Angel Scott	5 ft 10 in (1.78 m)	RS Sr	Stephen F. Austin	Edmond, Oklahoma
G	24	Kaemyn Bekemeier	5 ft 9 in (1.75 m)	Jr	Republic High School	Republic, Missouri
G	31	Audrey Hopkins	5 ft 11 in (1.8 m)	Fr	Lincoln Christian School	Tulsa, Oklahoma
G	32	Cady Pauley	5 ft 11 in (1.8 m)	Sr	Virginia	Milan, Missouri
F	33	Blake O'Grady	6 ft 0 in (1.83 m)	Jr	Dexter Southfield School	Brookline, Massachusetts

Head coach

- Beth Cunningham (Notre Dame)

Assistant coach(es)

- Olivia Malcolm (Dayton)
- Jay Spoonhour (Pittsburg State)
- Abby Emmert (Missouri State)
- Jordan Chavis (Missouri)

Legend

- (C) Team captain
- (S) Suspended
- (I) Ineligible
- (W) Walk-on
- Injured
- Current redshirt

Roster
Last update: February 6, 2026

== Schedule and results ==
Date time, TV	Rank^{#}	Opponent^{#}	Result	Record	High points	High rebounds	High assists	Site (attendance) city, state
Exhibition
October 28, 2025*; 6:30 pm		Northeastern State	W 75–57	–	17 – Lee	8 – James	7 – James	Great Southern Bank Arena (1,797); Springfield, MO
Non-conference regular season
November 3, 2025*; 6:30 pm, ESPN+		Saint Louis	W 70–66	1–0	23 – Bekemeier	9 – Bekemeier	2 – Tied	Great Southern Bank Arena (2,030); Springfield, MO
November 7, 2025*; 6:30 pm, ESPN+		at UT Arlington	W 69–53	2–0	20 – Lee	9 – Bekemeier	6 – James	College Park Center (586); Arlington, TX
November 11, 2025*; 6:30 pm, ESPN+		at Southeast Missouri State	W 67–57	3–0	22 – Bekemeier	10 – Bekemeier	5 – James	Show Me Center (850); Cape Girardeau, MO
November 15, 2025*; 3:30 pm		vs. Wichita State	W 66–57	4–0	14 – Lee	10 – Bekemeier	3 – Bush	T-Mobile Center; Kansas City, MO
November 18, 2025*; 6:30 pm, ESPN+		Georgia Southern	W 69–58	5–0	21 – Douglas	13 – Bekemeier	4 – James	Great Southern Bank Arena (2,080); Springfield, MO
November 22, 2025*; 2:00 pm, ESPN+		at Tulsa	L 57−73	5−1	19 – Bekemeier	7 – Bekemeier	2 – Washington	Reynolds Center (1,283); Tulsa, OK
November 28, 2025*; 3:00 pm, FloHoops		vs. Florida State; Coconut Hoops Great Egret Division semifinals	L 75−85	5−2	16 – Douglas	6 – Tied	3 – Tied	Alico Arena (952); Fort Myers, FL
November 30, 2025*; 3:00 pm, FloHoops		vs. Coppin State; Coconut Hoops Great Egret Division consolation	W 77–56	6–2	23 – Pauley	6 – James	4 – Bush	Alico Arena (868); Fort Myers, FL
December 4, 2025*; 6:30 pm, ESPN+		at Tulane	W 72–66	7–2	22 – Bekemeier	7 – Tied	5 – Pauley	Devlin Fieldhouse (657); New Orleans, LA
December 7, 2025*; 2:00 pm, ESPN+		Kansas	L 70–73 ^{OT}	7–3	21 – Bekemeier	9 – Douglas	3 – James	Great Southern Bank Arena (2,338); Springfield, MO
December 13, 2025*; 1:00 pm, ESPN+		Arkansas	L 58–73	7–4	18 – Bekemeier	7 – Brueggen	3 – Washington	Great Southern Bank Arena (2,862); Springfield, MO
December 19, 2025*; 6:30 pm, ESPN+		Gonzaga	L 49–68	7–5	13 – Pauley	7 – Bekemeier	3 – Washington	Great Southern Bank Arena (1,801); Springfield, MO
December 22, 2025*; 1:00 pm, ESPN+		Central Arkansas	W 65−61	8−5	24 – Bekemeier	14 – Bekemeier	5 – Bekemeier	Great Southern Bank Arena (1,569); Springfield, MO
C-USA regular season
January 4, 2026; 12:00 pm, ESPN+		at FIU	W 80–69	9–5 (1–0)	19 – Washington	11 – Washington	7 – Bekemeier	Ocean Bank Convocation Center (85); Miami, FL
January 8, 2026; 6:30 pm, ESPN+		Kennesaw State	W 67–61	10–5 (2–0)	26 – Bekemeier	11 – Bekemeier	3 – Tied	Great Southern Bank Arena (1,863); Springfield, MO
January 10, 2026; 12:00 pm, ESPN+		Jacksonville State	W 63–47	11–5 (3–0)	31 – Bekemeier	14 – Bekemeier	4 – James	Great Southern Bank Arena (2,190); Springfield, MO
January 15, 2026; 8:00 pm, ESPN+		at UTEP	W 71–64	12–5 (4–0)	21 – Bekemeier	6 – Douglas	3 – Bekemeier	Don Haskins Center (821); El Paso, TX
January 17, 2026; 1:00 pm, ESPN+		at New Mexico State	L 56–63	12–6 (4–1)	17 – Douglas	8 – Washington	4 – James	Pan American Center (959); Las Cruces, NM
January 22, 2026; 6:30 pm, ESPN+		Louisiana Tech	L 51–60	12–7 (4–2)	15 – Tied	7 – Bekemeier	3 – James	Great Southern Bank Arena (2,326); Springfield, MO
January 30, 2026; 6:00 pm, ESPN+		at Delaware	W 79–54	13–7 (5–2)	17 – Douglas	12 – Bekemeier	5 – Bush	Bob Carpenter Center (754); Newark, DE
February 1, 2026; 1:00 pm, ESPN+		at Liberty	L 52–60	13–8 (5–3)	24 – Bekemeier	7 – Bekemeier	3 – Tied	Liberty Arena (1,060); Lynchburg, VA
February 5, 2026; 6:30 pm, ESPN+		Middle Tennessee	W 60–54	14–8 (6–3)	25 – Bekemeier	8 – Tied	3 – James	Great Southern Bank Arena (2,088); Springfield, MO
February 7, 2026; 1:00 pm, ESPN+		Western Kentucky	W 75–52	15–8 (7–3)	21 – Bekemeier	8 – Douglas	6 – Bush	Great Southern Bank Arena (2,641); Springfield, MO
February 12, 2026; 6:30 pm, ESPN+		at Sam Houston	L 67–74	15–9 (7–4)	21 – Bekemeier	11 – Douglas	3 – Brueggen	Bernard Johnson Coliseum (545); Huntsville, TX
February 14, 2026; 1:00 pm, ESPN+		at Louisiana Tech	L 67–68	15–10 (7–5)	18 – Douglas	13 – Washington	8 – Bush	Thomas Assembly Center; Ruston, LA
February 19, 2026; 6:30 pm, ESPN+		Liberty	L 43–55	15–11 (7–6)	19 – Bekemeier	11 – Washington	2 – Washington	Great Southern Bank Arena (2,225); Springfield, MO
February 21, 2026; 1:00 pm, ESPN+		Delaware	W 83–57	16–11 (8–6)	28 – Douglas	12 – Douglas	5 – Tied	Great Southern Bank Arena (2,451); Springfield, MO
February 24, 2026; 6:30 pm, ESPN+		Sam Houston	W 60–55	17–11 (9–6)	20 – Douglas	9 – Washington	4 – Washington	Great Southern Bank Arena (2,259); Springfield, MO
February 26, 2026; 6:30 pm, ESPN+		FIU	W 69–38	18–11 (10–6)	20 – Douglas	13 – Douglas	4 – James	Great Southern Bank Arena (2,074); Springfield, MO
March 5, 2026; 6:30 pm, ESPN+		at Western Kentucky	W 65-38	19–11 (11–6)	22 – Douglas	11 – Washington	5 – James	E. A. Diddle Arena (1,030); Bowling Green, KY
March 7, 2026; 2:00 pm, ESPN+		at Middle Tennessee	L 75-86	19–12 (11–7)	18 – Brueggen	7 – Douglas	3 – Tied	Murphy Center (3,807); Murfreesboro, TN
C-USA tournament
March 12, 2026; 2:00 pm, ESPN+	(6)	vs. (3) Middle Tennessee; Quarterfinals	W 69-66	20-12	15 – Bekemeier	11 – Bekemeier	7 – Washington	Propst Arena (3,528); Huntsville, AL
March 13, 2026; 8:00 pm, ESPN+	(6)	vs. (2) FIU; Semifinals	W 74-69	21-12	22 – Bekemeier	11 – Washington	7 – Bekemeier	Propst Arena (2,187); Huntsville, AL
March 14, 2026; 4:30 pm, CBSSN	(6)	vs. (1) Louisiana Tech; Final	W 43-38	22-12	16 – Bekemeier	11 – Douglas	4 – James	Propst Arena (2,623); Huntsville, AL
NCAA tournament
March 18, 2026; 8:00 pm, ESPN2	(16 FW3)	vs. (16 FW3) Stephen F. Austin; First Four	W 85–75	23–12	22 – Bekemeier	13 – Bekemeier	4 – Tied	Moody Center (681); Austin, Texas
March 20, 2026; 3:00 pm, ESPN	(16 FW3)	at (1 FW3) No. 3 Texas; First Round	L 45–87	23–13	14 – Bekemeier	8 – Douglas	3 – James	Moody Center (7,938); Austin, Texas
*Non-conference game. ^{#}Rankings from AP Poll. (#) Tournament seedings in parentheses. All times are in Central.
