= 2025–26 Louisiana Tech Lady Techsters basketball team =

American college basketball season

2025–26 Louisiana Tech Lady Techsters basketball

CUSA regular season champions

WBIT, First Round
- Conference: Conference USA
- Record: 26–7 (17–1 C-USA)
- Head coach: Brooke Stoehr (10th season)
- Assistant coaches: Scott Stoehr; Josh Ashley; Olivia Grayson; Caleb Livingston
- Home arena: Thomas Assembly Center

2025–26 Conference USA women's basketball standings
	Conf.				Overall
Team	W		L	PCT	W		L	PCT
Louisiana Tech	17	–	1	.944	26	–	7	.788
FIU	12	–	6	.667	21	–	12	.636
Middle Tennessee	11	–	7	.611	17	–	16	.515
Sam Houston	11	–	7	.611	18	–	13	.581
Liberty	11	–	7	.611	18	–	13	.581
Missouri State †	11	–	7	.611	23	–	13	.639
Jacksonville State	9	–	9	.500	16	–	16	.500
Delaware	6	–	12	.333	13	–	19	.406
Kennesaw State	6	–	12	.333	13	–	17	.433
UTEP	5	–	13	.278	13	–	17	.433
New Mexico State	5	–	13	.278	9	–	21	.300
Western Kentucky	4	–	14	.222	8	–	21	.276
† 2026 CUSA tournament winner

The 2025–26 Louisiana Tech Lady Techsters basketball team represents Louisiana Tech University during the 2025–26 NCAA Division I women's basketball season. The Lady Techsters, led by tenth-year head coach Brooke Stoehr, play their home games at the Thomas Assembly Center in Ruston, Louisiana as members of Conference USA.

== Previous season ==
The Lady Techsters finished the 2024–25 season 18–16, 8–10 in C-USA play, to finish in fifth place. They defeated New Mexico State, before falling to top-seeded and eventual tournament champions Liberty in the semifinals of the C-USA tournament. They received an at-large bid to the WNIT, where they would defeat Texas Southern in the second round, and Lindenwood in the Super 16, before falling to Illinois State in the Great 8.

== Preseason ==
On October 9, 2025, Conference USA released their preseason poll. Louisiana Tech was picked to finish atop the conference, with five first-place votes.

=== Preseason rankings ===
Conference USA Preseason Poll
Place	Team	Votes
1	Louisiana Tech	128 (5)
2	Liberty	125 (5)
3	Middle Tennessee	123 (2)
4	Missouri State	107
5	Western Kentucky	96
6	FIU	74
7	Sam Houston	59
T-8	UTEP	57
T-8	Kennesaw State	57
10	New Mexico State	51
11	Delaware	36
12	Jacksonville State	23
(#) first-place votes

=== CUSA Preseason Player of the Year ===
CUSA Preseason Player of the Year
Player	Position	Year
Paris Bradley	Guard	Sophomore

=== Preseason All-CUSA Team ===
Preseason All-CUSA Team
Player	Position	Year
Paris Bradley	Guard	Sophomore
Jordan Marshall	Forward	Sophomore

== Roster ==
2025–26 Louisiana Tech Lady Techsters women's basketball team
Players
Coaches

Pos.	#	Name	Height	Year	Previous school	Hometown
G	1	Alexia Weaver	5 ft 8 in (1.73 m)	Jr	Three Rivers College	Louisville, Kentucky
F	3	Hillary Dawson	6 ft 3 in (1.91 m)	Fr	Malakoff High School	Malakoff, Texas
G	4	Joy Madison-Key	5 ft 8 in (1.73 m)	RS So	Tulane	Grand Prairie, Texas
G	10	Jayden Terry	5 ft 9 in (1.75 m)	Fr	Gainesville High School	Gainesville, Florida
F	15	Jordan Marshall	6 ft 0 in (1.83 m)	So	Little Rock Central High School	Little Rock, Arkansas
F	18	Isla Airey	6 ft 4 in (1.93 m)	So	Caulfield Grammar School	Melbourne, Australia
G	21	Kennedy Evans	5 ft 10 in (1.78 m)	So	Oklahoma State	Little Elm, Texas
G	22	Jianna Morris	5 ft 7 in (1.7 m)	Jr	Sylvan Hills High School	Sherwood, Arkansas
G	23	Paris Bradley	5 ft 9 in (1.75 m)	So	Hebron High School	Carrollton, Texas
F	25	Averi Aaron	6 ft 1 in (1.85 m)	So	Boerne High School	Boerne, Texas
G	30	Kaleigh Thompson	6 ft 0 in (1.83 m)	Jr	Three Rivers College	Lonoke, Arkansas
F	33	Mackenzie Wurm	6 ft 4 in (1.93 m)	GS	Allen High School	Allen, Texas

Head coach

- Brooke Stoehr (Louisiana Tech)

Assistant coach(es)

- Scott Stoehr (North Texas)
- Josh Ashley (Tarleton State)
- Olivia Grayson (Tulane)
- Caleb Livingston (Williams Baptist)

Legend

- (C) Team captain
- (S) Suspended
- (I) Ineligible
- (W) Walk-on
- Injured
- Current redshirt

Roster
Last update: February 5, 2026

== Schedule and results ==
Date time, TV	Rank^{#}	Opponent^{#}	Result	Record	High points	High rebounds	High assists	Site (attendance) city, state
Non-conference regular season
November 4, 2025*; 6:30 pm, SECN+		at Arkansas	L 81–93	0–1	20 – Marshall	6 – Tied	3 – Tied	Bud Walton Arena (2,111); Fayetteville, AR
November 7, 2025*; 6:30 pm, ESPN+		at Louisiana–Monroe	L 62–70	0–2	16 – Weaver	7 – Tied	4 – Bradley	Fant–Ewing Coliseum (1,593); Monroe, LA
November 11, 2025*; 6:30 pm, ESPN+		Louisiana Christian	W 121–34	1–2	20 – Marshall	18 – Marshall	6 – Bradley	Thomas Assembly Center (1,386); Ruston, LA
November 18, 2025*; 11:30 am, ESPN+		Arkansas–Pine Bluff	W 73–49	2–2	17 – Morris	8 – Marshall	3 – Tied	Thomas Assembly Center (4,200); Ruston, LA
November 23, 2025*; 2:00 pm, ESPN+		Stephen F. Austin	W 93–66	3–2	18 – Bradley	13 – Marshall	7 – Weaver	Thomas Assembly Center; Ruston, LA
November 26, 2025*; 2:00 pm, ESPN+		at No. 15 Baylor	L 46−75	3−3	10 – Bradley	6 – Dawson	5 – Madison-Key	Foster Pavilion (3,247); Waco, TX
December 4, 2025*; 6:30 pm, ESPN+		South Alabama	W 82−80	4−3	27 – Weaver	16 – Marshall	5 – Madison-Key	Thomas Assembly Center (1,374); Ruston, LA
December 9, 2025*; 6:30 pm, ESPN+		Grambling State	W 74–60	5–3	20 – Marshall	9 – Dawson	6 – Tied	Thomas Assembly Center (1,457); Ruston, LA
December 13, 2025*; 5:00 pm, ESPNU		vs. No. 5 LSU; Compete 4 Cause Classic	L 61–87	5–4	19 – Bradley	7 – Tied	3 – Weaver	Smoothie King Center; New Orleans, LA
December 17, 2025*; 6:30 pm, ESPN+		Central Arkansas	W 70–55	6–4	16 – Tied	10 – Marshall	3 – Tied	Thomas Assembly Center (1,364); Ruston, LA
December 20, 2025*; 2:00 pm, ESPN+		Central Baptist	W 97–24	7–4	14 – Tied	10 – Tied	6 – Weaver	Thomas Assembly Center (1,379); Ruston, LA
C-USA regular season
January 2, 2026; 6:30 pm, ESPN+		Sam Houston	L 64–67	7–5 (0–1)	16 – Thompson	6 – Tied	7 – Weaver	Thomas Assembly Center (1,431); Ruston, LA
January 8, 2026; 6:00 pm, ESPN+		at Delaware	W 65−50	8−5 (1–1)	17 – Weaver	10 – Aaron	7 – Aaron	Bob Carpenter Center (701); Newark, DE
January 11, 2026; 12:00 pm, ESPNU		at Liberty	W 86–72	8–5 (2–1)	31 – Bradley	7 – Aaron	6 – Tied	Liberty Arena (1,042); Lynchburg, VA
January 15, 2026; 6:30 pm, ESPN+		Middle Tennessee	W 61–48	10–5 (3–1)	17 – Bradley	8 – Marshall	4 – Bradley	Thomas Assembly Center (1,405); Ruston, LA
January 17, 2026; 1:00 pm, ESPN+		Western Kentucky	W 79–65	11–5 (4–1)	16 – Weaver	8 – Thompson	7 – Madison-Key	Thomas Assembly Center (1,568); Ruston, LA
January 22, 2026; 6:30 pm, ESPN+		at Missouri State	W 60–51	12–5 (5–1)	20 – Bradley	8 – Marshall	3 – Tied	Great Southern Bank Arena (2,326); Springfield, MO
January 24, 2026; 12:00 pm, ESPN+		at FIU	W 74–59	13–5 (6–1)	16 – Thompson	8 – Thompson	8 – Bradley	Ocean Bank Convocation Center (188); Miami, FL
January 29, 2026; 6:30 pm, ESPN+		Kennesaw State	W 72–44	14–5 (7–1)	15 – Bradley	6 – Tied	5 – Madison-Key	Thomas Assembly Center (1,496); Ruston, LA
January 31, 2026; 2:00 pm, ESPN+		Jacksonville State	W 71–51	15–5 (8–1)	13 – Bradley	9 – Aaron	8 – Madison-Key	Thomas Assembly Center (1,736); Ruston, LA
February 5, 2026; 8:00 pm, ESPN+		at UTEP	W 87–48	16–5 (9–1)	21 – Morris	6 – Marshall	6 – Weaver	Don Haskins Center (1,127); El Paso, TX
February 7, 2026; 1:00 pm, ESPN+		at New Mexico State	W 77–58	17–5 (10–1)	20 – Weaver	7 – Tied	5 – Bradley	Pan American Center (787); Las Cruces, NM
February 12, 2026; 6:30 pm, ESPN+		FIU	W 71–49	18–5 (11–1)	14 – Tied	9 – Marshall	3 – Madison-Key	Thomas Assembly Center (1,568); Ruston, LA
February 14, 2026; 1:00 pm, ESPN+		Missouri State	W 68–67	19–5 (12–1)	14 – Weaver	7 – Marshall	6 – Madison-Key	Thomas Assembly Center; Ruston, LA
February 19, 2026; 6:30 pm, ESPN+		at Jacksonville State	W 58–57	20–5 (13–1)	15 – Morris	8 – Thompson	3 – Madison-Key	Pete Mathews Coliseum (597); Jacksonville, AL
February 21, 2026; 1:00 pm, ESPN+		at Kennesaw State	W 63–59	21–5 (14–1)	14 – Tied	5 – Airey	4 – Tied	VyStar Arena (835); Kennesaw, GA
February 28, 2026; 2:00 pm, ESPN+		at Sam Houston	W 75–60	22–5 (15–1)	14 – Bradley	9 – Tied	6 – Madison-Key	Bernard Johnson Coliseum (738); Huntsville, TX
March 5, 2026; 6:30 pm, ESPN+		New Mexico State	W 88-47	23–5 (16–1)	19 – Morris	9 – Bradley	3 – Weaver	Thomas Assembly Center (1,442); Ruston, LA
March 7, 2026; 6:00 pm, ESPN+		UTEP	W 91-87	24–5 (17–1)	26 – Bradley	9 – Tied	6 – Madison-Key	Thomas Assembly Center (2,490); Ruston, LA
C-USA tournament
March 11, 2026; 11:30 am, ESPN+	(1)	vs. (8) Delaware; Quarterfinals	W 72-43	25–5	25 – Bradley	7 – Airey	9 – Madison-Key	Propst Arena; Huntsville, AL
March 13, 2026; 5:30 pm, ESPN+	(1)	vs. (5) Liberty; Semifinals	W 61–48	26–5	14 – Tied	6 – Marshall	3 – Madison-Key	Propst Arena (2,035); Huntsville, AL
March 14, 2026; 4:30 pm, CBSSN	(1)	vs. (6) Missouri State; Championship	L 38–43	26–6	14 – Bradley	8 – Tied	4 – Madison-Key	Propst Arena (2,623); Huntsville, AL
WBIT
March 19, 2026*; 7:00 pm, ESPN+		at (3) Rice; First Round	L 61–66	26–7	17 – Bradley	7 – Dawson	3 – Morris	Tudor Fieldhouse (325); Houston, TX
*Non-conference game. ^{#}Rankings from AP Poll. (#) Tournament seedings in parentheses. All times are in Central.
