= 2025–26 UTEP Miners women's basketball team =

American college basketball season

2025–26 UTEP Miners women's basketball
- Conference: Conference USA
- Record: 13–17 (5–13 C-USA)
- Head coach: Keitha Adams (3rd, 19th overall season)
- Associate head coach: Ewa Laskowska
- Assistant coaches: Jareica Hughes; Lulu McKinney
- Home arena: Don Haskins Center

2025–26 Conference USA women's basketball standings
	Conf.				Overall
Team	W		L	PCT	W		L	PCT
Louisiana Tech	17	–	1	.944	26	–	7	.788
FIU	12	–	6	.667	21	–	12	.636
Middle Tennessee	11	–	7	.611	17	–	16	.515
Sam Houston	11	–	7	.611	18	–	13	.581
Liberty	11	–	7	.611	18	–	13	.581
Missouri State †	11	–	7	.611	23	–	13	.639
Jacksonville State	9	–	9	.500	16	–	16	.500
Delaware	6	–	12	.333	13	–	19	.406
Kennesaw State	6	–	12	.333	13	–	17	.433
UTEP	5	–	13	.278	13	–	17	.433
New Mexico State	5	–	13	.278	9	–	21	.300
Western Kentucky	4	–	14	.222	8	–	21	.276
† 2026 CUSA tournament winner

The 2025–26 UTEP Miners women's basketball team represents the University of Texas at El Paso during the 2025–26 NCAA Division I women's basketball season. The Miners, led by head coach Keitha Adams in the third season of her second stint as head coach, and 19th season overall, play their home games at the Don Haskins Center in El Paso, Texas, as members of Conference USA.

== Previous season ==
The Miners finished the 2024–25 season 11–19, 4–14 in C-USA play, to finish in a tie for ninth (last) place. They were defeated by Kennesaw State in the first round of the C-USA tournament.

== Preseason ==
On October 9, 2025, Conference USA released their preseason poll. Kennesaw State was picked to finish tied for eighth in the conference.

=== Preseason rankings ===
Conference USA Preseason Poll
Place	Team	Votes
1	Louisiana Tech	128 (5)
2	Liberty	125 (5)
3	Middle Tennessee	123 (2)
4	Missouri State	107
5	Western Kentucky	96
6	FIU	74
7	Sam Houston	59
T-8	UTEP	57
T-8	Kennesaw State	57
10	New Mexico State	51
11	Delaware	36
12	Jacksonville State	23
(#) first-place votes

=== Preseason All-CUSA Team ===
Preseason All-CUSA Team
Player	Position	Year
Ivane Tensaie	Guard	Graduate Student

== Roster ==
2025–26 UTEP Miners women's basketball team
Players
Coaches

Pos.	#	Name	Height	Year	Previous school	Hometown
G	1	Aaliyah Davis	5 ft 7 in (1.7 m)	Sr	Kilgore College	El Paso, Texas
G	2	Sirviva Legions	5 ft 8 in (1.73 m)	Sr	LIU	Brooklyn, New York
G	3	Ivane Tensaie	5 ft 7 in (1.7 m)	GS	Penn State	Roseville, Minnesota
G	4	Delma Zita	5 ft 8 in (1.73 m)	GS	New Mexico Junior College	Maputo, Mozambique
G	5	Heaven Samayoa-Mathis	5 ft 7 in (1.7 m)	Sr	Salt Lake Community College	Sacramento, California
G/F	8	Brooklyn Terry	6 ft 0 in (1.83 m)	Fr	Legion Prep	Mansfield, Texas
F	10	Osadebamwen Igbinedion Omoruyi	6 ft 4 in (1.93 m)	So	Real Canoe	Madrid, Spain
G	11	Portia Adams	5 ft 6 in (1.68 m)	Sr	Lamar	Cedar Hill, Texas
G	12	Irene Asensio	5 ft 8 in (1.73 m)	So	Sant Adria Femenil	Barcelona, Spain
F	13	Ndack Mbengue	6 ft 3 in (1.91 m)	Sr	Cowley Community College	Bergamo, Italy
G	14	Tatiana Collazo	5 ft 8 in (1.73 m)	Jr	San Jose City College	San Jose, California
G	15	Abby Priscilla	5 ft 11 in (1.8 m)	Jr	Grayson College	Kampala, Uganda
F	20	Blessing Okhwodiasa	6 ft 2 in (1.88 m)	Fr	Elite Sports Academy	Madrid, Spain
F	22	Mary Moses Amaniyo	6 ft 1 in (1.85 m)	So	KIU Rangers	Arua, Uganda
G	23	Aolani Woldai	5 ft 7 in (1.7 m)	Fr	Brewer High School	Fort Worth, Texas

Head coach

- Keitha Adams (Southwestern College)

Assistant coach(es)

- Ewa Laskowska (Kansas State)
- Jareica Hughes (UTEP)
- Lulu McKinney (UTEP)

Legend

- (C) Team captain
- (S) Suspended
- (I) Ineligible
- (W) Walk-on
- Injured
- Current redshirt

Roster
Last update: February 10, 2026

== Schedule and results ==
Date time, TV	Rank^{#}	Opponent^{#}	Result	Record	High points	High rebounds	High assists	Site (attendance) city, state
Non-conference regular season
November 3, 2025*; 12:00 pm, ESPN+		Prairie View A&M	W 84–60	1–0	16 – Moses Amaniyo	22 – Moses Amaniyo	4 – Samayoa-Mathis	Don Haskins Center (639); El Paso, TX
November 8, 2025*; 7:00 pm, ESPN+		Nicholls	W 76–61	2–0	16 – Adams	8 – Moses Amaniyo	4 – Adams	Don Haskins Center (1,040); El Paso, TX
November 11, 2025*; 11:00 am, ESPN+		Western New Mexico	W 81–56	3–0	12 – Moses Amaniyo	12 – Tied	5 – Adams	Don Haskins Center (1,068); El Paso, TX
November 22, 2025*; 7:00 pm, ESPN+		UT Martin	W 64–60 ^{OT}	4–0	18 – Moses Amaniyo	18 – Moses Amaniyo	5 – Zita	Don Haskins Center (941); El Paso, TX
November 25, 2025*; 6:00 pm, SLN		at Kansas City	W 75−64	5−0	19 – Tensaie	13 – Moses Amaniyo	6 – Samayoa-Mathis	Swinney Recreation Center (283); Kansas City, MO
November 29, 2025*; 2:00 pm, ESPN+		Denver	W 69−52	6−0	26 – Tensaie	10 – Mbengue	6 – Zita	Don Haskins Center (1,096); El Paso, TX
December 3, 2025*; 7:00 pm, ESPN+		Texas A&M–Corpus Christi	W 62–44	7–0	15 – Tensaie	8 – Tied	5 – Zita	Don Haskins Center (923); El Paso, TX
December 6, 2025*; 12:00 pm, ESPN+		at No. 8 TCU	L 40–95	7–1	10 – Tied	10 – Mbengue	2 – Samayoa-Mathis	Schollmaier Arena (2,846); Fort Worth, TX
December 13, 2025*; 1:00 pm, ESPN+		at BYU	L 46–81	7–2	13 – Legions	7 – Mbengue	3 – Legions	Marriott Center (1,977); Provo, UT
December 18, 2025*; 7:00 pm, ESPN+		UC Irvine	L 72–93	7–3	18 – Adams	6 – Mbengue	5 – Tied	Don Haskins Center (905); El Paso, TX
December 29, 2025*; 7:00 pm, ESPN+		Southwest	W 102–43	8–3	20 – Moses Amaniyo	12 – Tied	7 – Adams	Don Haskins Center (1,078); El Paso, TX
C-USA regular season
January 2, 2026; 7:00 pm, ESPN+		Delaware	W 82−71	9−3 (1–0)	26 – Mbengue	14 – Mbengue	8 – Adams	Don Haskins Center (957); El Paso, TX
January 4, 2026; 12:00 pm, ESPN+		Liberty	L 66–86	9–4 (1–1)	17 – Adams	11 – Mbengue	4 – Samayoa-Mathis	Don Haskins Center (795); El Paso, TX
January 8, 2026; 5:30 pm, ESPN+		at Middle Tennessee	L 43–86	9–5 (1–2)	14 – Moses Amaniyo	10 – Moses Amaniyo	1 – Tied	Murphy Center (3,072); Murfreesboro, TN
January 10, 2026; 11:00 am, ESPN+		at Western Kentucky	L 59–68	9–6 (1–3)	16 – Tensaie	11 – Mbengue	3 – Tied	E. A. Diddle Arena (703); Bowling Green, KY
January 15, 2026; 7:00 pm, ESPN+		Missouri State	L 64–71	9–7 (1–4)	17 – Samayoa-Mathis	5 – Tied	2 – Tied	Don Haskins Center (821); El Paso, TX
January 17, 2026; 12:00 pm, ESPN+		FIU	L 59–67	9–8 (1–5)	21 – Adams	12 – Legions	4 – Samayoa-Mathis	Don Haskins Center (881); El Paso, TX
January 22, 2026; 5:00 pm, ESPN+		at Kennesaw State	L 52–83	9–9 (1–6)	14 – Adams	9 – Moses Amaniyo	2 – Moses Amaniyo	VyStar Arena (441); Kennesaw, GA
January 24, 2026; 11:00 am, ESPN+		at Jacksonville State	L 60–73	9–10 (1–7)	15 – Adams	11 – Legions	3 – Tied	Pete Mathews Coliseum (471); Jacksonville, AL
January 31, 2026; 2:00 pm, ESPN+		New Mexico State; Battle of I-10	W 79–69	10–10 (2–7)	21 – Adams	11 – Mbengue	7 – Adams	Don Haskins Center (1,752); El Paso, TX
February 5, 2026; 7:00 pm, ESPN+		Louisiana Tech	L 48–87	10–11 (2–8)	11 – Moses Amaniyo	9 – Moses Amaniyo	3 – Tied	Don Haskins Center (1,127); El Paso, TX
February 7, 2026; 2:00 pm, ESPN+		Sam Houston	L 58–70	10–12 (2–9)	15 – Adams	7 – Tied	4 – Zita	Don Haskins Center (1,013); El Paso, TX
February 12, 2026; 3:00 pm, ESPN+		at Liberty	L 48–58	10–13 (2–10)	13 – Moses Amaniyo	8 – Moses Amaniyo	6 – Zita	Liberty Arena (849); Lynchburg, VA
February 14, 2026; 10:00 am, ESPN+		at Delaware	W 79–72	11–13 (3–10)	17 – Woldai	6 – Tied	4 – Samayoa-Mathis	Bob Carpenter Center (1,377); Newark, DE
February 21, 2026; 2:00 pm, ESPN+		at New Mexico State; Battle of I-10	W 69–58	12–13 (4–10)	14 – Tied	14 – Mbengue	6 – Zita	Pan American Center (712); Las Cruces, NM
February 26, 2026; 7:00 pm, ESPN+		Jacksonville State	W 66–64	13–13 (5–10)	23 – Adams	11 – Mbengue	3 – Tied	Don Haskins Center (1,150); El Paso, TX
February 28, 2026; 2:00 pm, ESPN+		Kennesaw State	L 57–58	13–14 (5–11)	16 – Adams	11 – Mbengue	5 – Adams	Don Haskins Center (1,191); El Paso, TX
March 5, 2026; 5:30 pm, ESPN+		at Sam Houston	L 59-71	13-15 (5-12)	14 – Tied	10 – Mbengue	4 – Zita	Bernard Johnson Coliseum (378); Huntsville, TX
March 7, 2026; 5:00 pm, ESPN+		at Louisiana Tech	L 87-91	13-16 (5-13)	26 – Tensaie	8 – Tied	6 – Tied	Thomas Assembly Center (2,490); Ruston, LA
C-USA tournament
March 10, 2026; 1:00 pm, ESPN+	(10)	vs. (7) Jacksonville State; First Round	L 77-82 ^{2 OT}	13-17	27 – Adams	8 – Mbengue	3 – Adams	Propst Arena; Huntsville, AL
*Non-conference game. ^{#}Rankings from AP Poll. (#) Tournament seedings in parentheses. All times are in Mountain.
