= 2025–26 Delaware Fightin' Blue Hens women's basketball team =

American college basketball season

2025–26 Delaware Fightin' Blue Hens women's basketball
- Conference: Conference USA
- Record: 13–19 (6–12 C-USA)
- Head coach: Sarah Jenkins (4th season)
- Associate head coach: Fred Batchelor
- Assistant coaches: Bri Hutchen; Sam Pierce
- Home arena: Bob Carpenter Center

2025–26 Conference USA women's basketball standings
	Conf.				Overall
Team	W		L	PCT	W		L	PCT
Louisiana Tech	17	–	1	.944	26	–	7	.788
FIU	12	–	6	.667	21	–	12	.636
Middle Tennessee	11	–	7	.611	17	–	16	.515
Sam Houston	11	–	7	.611	18	–	13	.581
Liberty	11	–	7	.611	18	–	13	.581
Missouri State †	11	–	7	.611	23	–	13	.639
Jacksonville State	9	–	9	.500	16	–	16	.500
Delaware	6	–	12	.333	13	–	19	.406
Kennesaw State	6	–	12	.333	13	–	17	.433
UTEP	5	–	13	.278	13	–	17	.433
New Mexico State	5	–	13	.278	9	–	21	.300
Western Kentucky	4	–	14	.222	8	–	21	.276
† 2026 CUSA tournament winner

The 2025–26 Delaware Fightin' Blue Hens women's basketball team represents the University of Delaware during the 2025–26 NCAA Division I women's basketball season. The Fightin' Blue Hens, led by fourth-year head coach Sarah Jenkins, play their home games at the Bob Carpenter Center in Newark, Delaware as first-year members of Conference USA.

== Previous season ==
The Fightin' Blue Hens finished the 2024–25 season 13–17, 9–9 in CAA play, to finish in a three-way tie for sixth place. They defeated UNC Wilmington, before falling to Charleston in the quarterfinals of the CAA tournament.

== Preseason ==
On October 9, 2025, Conference USA released their preseason poll. Delaware was picked to finish 11th in the conference.

=== Preseason rankings ===
Conference USA Preseason Poll
Place	Team	Votes
1	Louisiana Tech	128 (5)
2	Liberty	125 (5)
3	Middle Tennessee	123 (2)
4	Missouri State	107
5	Western Kentucky	96
6	FIU	74
7	Sam Houston	59
T-8	UTEP	57
T-8	Kennesaw State	57
10	New Mexico State	51
11	Delaware	36
12	Jacksonville State	23
(#) first-place votes

=== Preseason All-CUSA Team ===
No players were named to the Preseason All-CUSA Team.

== Roster ==
2025–26 Delaware Fightin' Blue Hens women's basketball team
Players
Coaches

Pos.	#	Name	Height	Year	Previous school	Hometown
G	0	Lay Fantroy	5 ft 10 in (1.78 m)	Jr	Texas Southern	Palestine, Texas
G	1	Kailah Correa	5 ft 4 in (1.63 m)	Fr	Lebanon High School	Lebanon, Pennsylvania
G	2	Kendall Scott	5 ft 7 in (1.7 m)	So	Gardner–Webb	Fredericksburg, Virginia
G	3	Ella Wanzer	5 ft 10 in (1.78 m)	GS	Binghamton	Buffalo, New York
G	4	Trinity Vance	5 ft 10 in (1.78 m)	So	Legacy Early College	Waterloo, South Carolina
G	6	Safi Kolliegbo	5 ft 9 in (1.75 m)	Jr	Niagara	Willingboro, New Jersey
G	10	Elle Stone	5 ft 11 in (1.8 m)	Fr	Mallard Creek High School	Charlotte, North Carolina
G	12	Jiya Perry	5 ft 11 in (1.8 m)	Sr	SMU	DeSoto, Texas
G	14	Amiya Carroll	5 ft 10 in (1.78 m)	Sr	Monmouth	Smyrna, Delaware
F	15	Ava Andrews	6 ft 1 in (1.85 m)	Fr	North Paulding High School	Dallas, Georgia
F	20	Claudia Clement	6 ft 3 in (1.91 m)	Jr	Evansville	Barcelona, Spain
C	21	Ande'a Cherisier	6 ft 1 in (1.85 m)	Jr	Saint Frances Academy	Baltimore, Maryland
F	22	Arantxa Portalez	6 ft 2 in (1.88 m)	Jr	Romareda Agustinos Recoletos	Zaragoza, Spain
G	23	Grace Sundback	5 ft 9 in (1.75 m)	Jr	Westtown School	Staten Island, New York
C	55	Gianna Johnson	6 ft 5 in (1.96 m)	So	George School	Levittown, Pennsylvania

Head coach

- Sarah Jenkins (Georgetown)

Assistant coach(es)

- Fred Batchelor (Valley Forge)
- Bri Hutchen (Alabama)
- Sam Pierce (Slippery Rock)

Legend

- (C) Team captain
- (S) Suspended
- (I) Ineligible
- (W) Walk-on
- Injured
- Current redshirt

Roster
Last update: February 9, 2026

== Schedule and results ==
Date time, TV	Rank^{#}	Opponent^{#}	Result	Record	High points	High rebounds	High assists	Site (attendance) city, state
Non-conference regular season
November 3, 2025*; 7:00 pm, ESPN+		Bloomsburg	W 83–59	1–0	15 – Vance	8 – Fantroy	2 – Tied	Bob Carpenter Center (889); Newark, DE
November 7, 2025*; 7:00 pm, ESPN+		Navy	L 61–68	1–1	19 – Correa	10 – Fantroy	2 – Tied	Bob Carpenter Center (936); Newark, DE
November 12, 2025*; 6:30 pm, ESPN+		at Old Dominion	L 66–73	1–2	14 – Cherisier	9 – Fantroy	3 – Correa	Chartway Arena (565); Norfolk, VA
November 17, 2025*; 6:00 pm, ESPN+		at American	W 68–57	2–2	18 – Correa	20 – Fantroy	4 – Cherisier	Bender Arena (426); Washington, D.C.
November 26, 2025*; 1:00 pm, ESPN+		at Loyola (MD)	W 67−55	3−2	17 – Cherisier	9 – Fantroy	2 – Tied	Reitz Arena (217); Baltimore, MD
November 30, 2025*; 2:00 pm, ESPN+		Towson	W 91−80	4−2	23 – Vance	13 – Cherisier	5 – Correa	Bob Carpenter Center (963); Newark, DE
December 5, 2025*; 6:00 pm, ESPN+		at Colgate	W 70–64 ^{OT}	5–2	17 – Cherisier	15 – Cherisier	2 – Tied	Cotterell Court (208); Hamilton, NY
December 10, 2025*; 7:00 pm, ESPN+		George Washington	L 59–63	5–3	18 – Correa	8 – Portalez	4 – Correa	Bob Carpenter Center (733); Newark, DE
December 17, 2025*; 11:00 am, ESPN+		La Salle	L 48–65	5–4	14 – Cherisier	10 – Cherisier	4 – Correa	Bob Carpenter Center (3,605); Newark, DE
December 20, 2025*; 2:00 pm, ESPN+		vs. Akron; Hawk Classic	W 75–56	6–4	25 – Wanzer	7 – Fantroy	5 – Kolliegbo	Hagan Arena (1,031); Philadelphia, PA
December 21, 2025*; 2:00 pm, ESPN+		at Saint Joseph's; Hawk Classic	L 66–73	6–5	16 – Cherisier	7 – Fantroy	3 – Tied	Hagan Arena (1,051); Philadelphia, PA
December 29, 2025*; 1:00 pm, ESPN+		at Harvard	L 63−70	6−6	18 – Cherisier	6 – Cherisier	4 – Fantroy	Lavietes Pavilion (717); Cambridge, MA
C-USA regular season
January 2, 2026; 9:00 pm, ESPN+		at UTEP	L 71–82	6–7 (0–1)	22 – Kolliegbo	10 – Cherisier	3 – Tied	Don Haskins Center (957); El Paso, TX
January 4, 2026; 4:00 pm, ESPN+		at New Mexico State	L 57–64 ^{OT}	6–8 (0–2)	12 – Cherisier	11 – Cherisier	2 – Tied	Pan American Center (468); Las Cruces, NM
January 8, 2026; 7:00 pm, ESPN+		Louisiana Tech	L 50–65	6–9 (0–3)	9 – Tied	6 – Fantroy	2 – Tied	Bob Carpenter Center (701); Newark, DE
January 10, 2026; 2:00 pm, ESPN+		Sam Houston	L 65–73 ^{OT}	6–10 (0–4)	24 – Kolliegbo	12 – Fantroy	2 – Tied	Bob Carpenter Center (797); Newark, DE
January 17, 2026; 5:00 pm, ESPN+		Liberty	W 76–69	7–10 (1–4)	21 – Correa	10 – Fantroy	3 – Tied	Bob Carpenter Center (2,600); Newark, DE
January 22, 2026; 7:30 pm, ESPN+		at Middle Tennessee	W 61–48	8–10 (2–4)	18 – Cherisier	13 – Cherisier	4 – Fantroy	Murphy Center (3,605); Murfreesboro, TN
January 23, 2026; 7:30 pm, ESPN+		at Western Kentucky	W 66–55	9–10 (3–4)	20 – Vance	12 – Fantroy	4 – Tied	E. A. Diddle Arena (632); Bowling Green, KY
January 30, 2026; 7:00 pm, ESPN+		Missouri State	L 54–79	9–11 (3–5)	20 – Kolliegbo	9 – Cherisier	1 – Tied	Bob Carpenter Center (754); Newark, DE
February 1, 2026; 4:00 pm, ESPN+		FIU	W 51–48	10–11 (4–5)	13 – Wanzer	10 – Fantroy	6 – Cherisier	Bob Carpenter Center (1,156); Newark, DE
February 5, 2026; 7:00 pm, ESPN+		at Kennesaw State	W 65–60	11–11 (5–5)	18 – Kolliegbo	12 – Cherisier	4 – Correa	VyStar Arena (681); Kennesaw, GA
February 7, 2026; 2:30 pm, ESPN+		at Jacksonville State	L 58–61	11–12 (5–6)	20 – Fantroy	16 – Fantroy	3 – Fantroy	Pete Mathews Coliseum (1,084); Jacksonville, AL
February 12, 2026; 7:00 pm, ESPN+		New Mexico State	W 65–62	12–12 (6–6)	18 – Cherisier	10 – Cherisier	3 – Tied	Bob Carpenter Center (1,196); Newark, DE
February 14, 2026; 12:00 pm, ESPN+		UTEP	L 72–79	12–13 (6–7)	17 – Cherisier	8 – Fantroy	4 – Correa	Bob Carpenter Center (1,377); Newark, DE
February 19, 2026; 11:00 am, ESPN+		at FIU	L 36–62	12–14 (6–8)	11 – Fantroy	6 – Fantroy	3 – Fantroy	Ocean Bank Convocation Center (1,062); Miami, FL
February 21, 2026; 2:00 pm, ESPN+		at Missouri State	L 57–83	12–15 (6–9)	18 – Fantroy	5 – Perry	3 – Correa	Great Southern Bank Arena (2,451); Springfield, MO
February 26, 2026; 7:00 pm, ESPN+		Western Kentucky	L 71–73	12–16 (6–10)	23 – Wanzer	14 – Fantroy	4 – Correa	Bob Carpenter Center (1,127); Newark, DE
February 28, 2026; 5:00 pm, ESPN+		Middle Tennessee	L 53–67	12–17 (6–11)	13 – Correa	10 – Cherisier	5 – Cherisier	Bob Carpenter Center (1,216); Newark, DE
March 6, 2026; 7:00 pm, ESPN+		at Liberty	L 64-71	12-18 (6-12)	19 – Fantroy	10 – Fantroy	5 – Vance	Liberty Arena (1,518); Lynchburg, VA
C-USA tournament
March 10, 2026; 12:30 pm, ESPN+	(8)	vs. (9) Kennesaw State; First Round	W 66-47	13-18	24 – Cherisier	10 – Fantroy	6 – Vance	Propst Arena; Huntsville, AL
March 11, 2026; 12:30 pm, ESPN+	(8)	vs. (1) Louisiana Tech; First Round	L 43-72	13-19	9 – Tied	7 – Kolliegbo	2 – Tied	Von Braun Center; Huntsville, AL
*Non-conference game. ^{#}Rankings from AP Poll. (#) Tournament seedings in parentheses. All times are in Eastern.
