= 2025–26 Western Kentucky Lady Toppers basketball team =

American college basketball season

2025–26 Western Kentucky Lady Toppers basketball
- Conference: Conference USA
- Record: 8–21 (4–14 C-USA)
- Head coach: Greg Collins (8th season)
- Associate head coach: Todd Buchanan
- Assistant coaches: Lexxus Graham-Blincoe; Whitney Creech; David Walls
- Home arena: E. A. Diddle Arena

2025–26 Conference USA women's basketball standings
	Conf.				Overall
Team	W		L	PCT	W		L	PCT
Louisiana Tech	17	–	1	.944	26	–	7	.788
FIU	12	–	6	.667	21	–	12	.636
Middle Tennessee	11	–	7	.611	17	–	16	.515
Sam Houston	11	–	7	.611	18	–	13	.581
Liberty	11	–	7	.611	18	–	13	.581
Missouri State †	11	–	7	.611	23	–	13	.639
Jacksonville State	9	–	9	.500	16	–	16	.500
Delaware	6	–	12	.333	13	–	19	.406
Kennesaw State	6	–	12	.333	13	–	17	.433
UTEP	5	–	13	.278	13	–	17	.433
New Mexico State	5	–	13	.278	9	–	21	.300
Western Kentucky	4	–	14	.222	8	–	21	.276
† 2026 CUSA tournament winner

The 2025–26 Western Kentucky Lady Toppers basketball team represents Western Kentucky University during the 2025–26 NCAA Division I women's basketball season. The Lady Toppers, led by eighth-year head coach Greg Collins, play their home games at E. A. Diddle Arena in Bowling Green, Kentucky as members of Conference USA.

== Previous season ==
The Lady Toppers finished the 2024–25 season 23–9, 13–5 in C-USA play, to finish in third place. They defeated FIU, before falling to Middle Tennessee in the semifinals of the C-USA tournament.

== Preseason ==
On October 9, 2025, Conference USA released their preseason poll. Western Kentucky was picked to finish fifth in the conference.

=== Preseason rankings ===
Conference USA Preseason Poll
Place	Team	Votes
1	Louisiana Tech	128 (5)
2	Liberty	125 (5)
3	Middle Tennessee	123 (2)
4	Missouri State	107
5	Western Kentucky	96
6	FIU	74
7	Sam Houston	59
T-8	UTEP	57
T-8	Kennesaw State	57
10	New Mexico State	51
11	Delaware	36
12	Jacksonville State	23
(#) first-place votes

=== Preseason All-CUSA Team ===
No players were named to the Preseason All-CUSA Team.

== Roster ==
2025–26 Western Kentucky Lady Toppers women's basketball team
Players
Coaches

Pos.	#	Name	Height	Year	Previous school	Hometown
G	0	Lola Bond	5 ft 4 in (1.63 m)	Fr	Kettle Moraine High School	Pewaukee, Wisconsin
F	2	Torri James	6 ft 0 in (1.83 m)	So	Rossview High School	Clarksville, Tennessee
G	3	Tia Shelling	5 ft 8 in (1.73 m)	Sr	Odessa College	New Orleans, Louisiana
F	4	Caleigh-Rose West (5th)	6 ft 0 in (1.83 m)	Sr	Iowa Western Community College	Orlando, Florida
F	5	Mya Pratcher	6 ft 0 in (1.83 m)	Sr	Jackson State	Memphis, Tennessee
G	11	Trinity Rowe	5 ft 5 in (1.65 m)	So	Southern Miss	Pikeville, Kentucky
F	13	Tatum Boettjer	6 ft 1 in (1.85 m)	Jr	Barton Community College	Derby, Kansas
F	20	Elif Naz Dal	6 ft 1 in (1.85 m)	Fr	Şerife Bacı 37	Adana, Turkey
G	21	Enni Ahervuo	5 ft 10 in (1.78 m)	Fr	Tapiolan Honka	Espoo, Finland
F	22	Jeniffer Silva	6 ft 4 in (1.93 m)	Sr	South Florida	Recife, Brazil
F	23	Zsofia Telegdy	6 ft 2 in (1.88 m)	Sr	Kansas	Budapest, Hungary
G	24	Yendri Acosta	5 ft 6 in (1.68 m)	Sr	South Plains College	Santo Domingo, Dominican Republic
G	34	Salma Khedr	6 ft 1 in (1.85 m)	So	Spire Academy	Giza, Egypt

Head coach

- Greg Collins (Louisville)

Assistant coach(es)

- Todd Buchanan (Murray State)
- Lexxus Graham-Blincoe (Campbellsville)
- Whitney Creech (Western Kentucky)
- David Walls (Western Kentucky)

Legend

- (C) Team captain
- (S) Suspended
- (I) Ineligible
- (W) Walk-on
- (5th) Fifth-year senior
- Injured
- Current redshirt

Roster
Last update: February 12, 2026

== Schedule and results ==
Date time, TV	Rank^{#}	Opponent^{#}	Result	Record	High points	High rebounds	High assists	Site (attendance) city, state
Exhibition
October 29, 2025*; 6:00 pm		Lindsey Wilson	W 52–41	–	12 – Telegdy	8 – Pratcher	5 – Rowe	E. A. Diddle Arena (1,047); Bowling Green, KY
Non-conference regular season
November 5, 2025*; 6:30 pm, ESPN+		Kentucky State	W 81–33	1–0	18 – Boettjer	11 – Shelling	6 – Shelling	E. A. Diddle Arena (767); Bowling Green, KY
November 8, 2025*; 11:00 am, ESPN+		at Longwood	L 42–80	1–1	12 – Silva	9 – Telegdy	2 – Tied	Joan Perry Brock Center (1,017); Farmville, VA
November 11, 2025*; 6:30 pm, ESPN+		Wichita State	W 73–71 ^{OT}	2–1	20 – Shelling	10 – Silva	6 – Shelling	E. A. Diddle Arena (603); Bowling Green, KY
November 14, 2025*; 6:30 pm, ESPN+		Indiana State	L 60–65	2–2	24 – Khedr	7 – Pratcher	4 – Telegdy	E. A. Diddle Arena (818); Bowling Green, KY
November 19, 2025*; 6:30 pm, ESPN+		No. 17 Vanderbilt	L 49–87	2–3	12 – Boettjer	7 – James	3 – Shelling	E. A. Diddle Arena (1,536); Bowling Green, KY
November 26, 2025*; 6:00 pm, B1G+		at Illinois	L 41−70	2−4	12 – James	5 – Tied	1 – Tied	State Farm Center (4,216); Champaign, IL
November 30, 2025*; 2:00 pm, ESPN+		at Southern Illinois	W 60−52	3−4	16 – Shelling	8 – Telegdy	6 – Telegdy	Banterra Center (321); Carbondale, IL
December 3, 2025*; 6:30 pm, ESPN+		Florida Atlantic	L 44–47	3–5	12 – James	6 – Tied	3 – Shelling	E. A. Diddle Arena (670); Bowling Green, KY
December 7, 2025*; 12:00 pm, ESPN+		at Miami (OH)	L 53–80	3–6	13 – Silva	5 – Tied	4 – Rowe	Millett Hall (451); Oxford, OH
December 14, 2025*; 12:00 pm, SLN		at North Dakota	W 80–50	4–6	15 – Telegdy	8 – Telegdy	7 – Rowe	Betty Engelstad Sioux Center (1,318); Grand Forks, ND
December 19, 2025*; 5:00 pm, ESPN+		at Chattanooga	L 58–59	4–7	17 – James	10 – James	4 – Rowe	McKenzie Arena (1,195); Chattanooga, TN
C-USA regular season
January 2, 2026; 6:30 pm, ESPN+		at Jacksonville State	L 48–75	4–8 (0–1)	10 – West	5 – West	3 – Rowe	Pete Mathews Coliseum (347); Jacksonville, AL
January 4, 2026; 1:00 pm, ESPN+		at Kennesaw State	L 64−78	4−9 (0–2)	20 – Telegdy	6 – Telegdy	10 – Rowe	VyStar Arena (639); Kennesaw, GA
January 8, 2026; 6:30 pm, ESPN+		New Mexico State	L 67–70	4–10 (0–3)	18 – Khedr	4 – Pratcher	6 – Tied	E. A. Diddle Arena (683); Bowling Green, KY
January 10, 2026; 12:00 pm, ESPN+		UTEP	W 68–59	5–10 (1–3)	18 – Khedr	7 – James	4 – Shelling	E. A. Diddle Arena (703); Bowling Green, KY
January 15, 2026; 6:30 pm, ESPN+		at Sam Houston	L 38–50	5–11 (1–4)	11 – Tied	7 – Khedr	2 – Tied	Bernard Johnson Coliseum (520); Huntsville, TX
January 17, 2026; 1:00 pm, ESPN+		at Louisiana Tech	L 65–79	5–12 (1–5)	15 – Khedr	4 – Tied	6 – Rowe	Thomas Assembly Center (1,568); Ruston, LA
January 22, 2026; 6:30 pm, ESPN+		Liberty	L 53–55	5–13 (1–6)	18 – Khedr	12 – Telegdy	6 – Rowe	E. A. Diddle Arena (767); Bowling Green, KY
January 23, 2026; 6:30 pm, ESPN+		Delaware	L 55–66	5–14 (1–7)	13 – Ahervuo	5 – Boettjer	3 – Ahervuo	E. A. Diddle Arena (632); Bowling Green, KY
January 31, 2026; 12:00 pm, ESPN+		at Middle Tennessee	L 58–81	5–15 (1–8)	13 – Khedr	7 – Khedr	5 – Rowe	Murphy Center (4,006); Murfreesboro, TN
February 5, 2026; 6:00 pm, ESPN+		at FIU	L 54–80	5–16 (1–9)	17 – Rowe	3 – Tied	2 – Tied	Ocean Bank Convocation Center (155); Miami, FL
February 7, 2026; 1:00 pm, ESPN+		at Missouri State	L 52–75	5–17 (1–10)	10 – Khedr	6 – Telegdy	2 – Tied	Great Southern Bank Arena (2,641); Springfield, MO
February 12, 2026; 11:00 am, ESPN+		Kennesaw State	L 51–55	5–18 (1–11)	12 – James	5 – Tied	7 – Rowe	E. A. Diddle Arena (2,621); Bowling Green, KY
February 14, 2026; 2:00 pm, ESPN+		Jacksonville State	W 56–41	6–18 (2–11)	16 – Khedr	5 – Tied	6 – Rowe	E. A. Diddle Arena (723); Bowling Green, KY
February 21, 2026; 2:00 pm, ESPN+		Middle Tennessee	W 70–65	7–18 (3–11)	20 – Khedr	8 – James	6 – Rowe	E. A. Diddle Arena (1,083); Bowling Green, KY
February 26, 2026; 6:00 pm, ESPN+		at Delaware	W 73–71	8–18 (4–11)	19 – Khedr	5 – Tied	5 – Tied	Bob Carpenter Center (1,127); Newark, DE
February 28, 2026; 1:00 pm, ESPN+		at Liberty	L 54–60	8–19 (4–12)	13 – Shelling	6 – Rowe	6 – Khedr	Liberty Arena (1,212); Lynchburg, VA
March 5, 2026; 6:30 pm, ESPN+		Missouri State	L 38-65	8-20 (4-13)	13 – James	6 – Tied	3 – Shelling	E. A. Diddle Arena (1,030); Bowling Green, KY
March 7, 2026; 1:00 pm, ESPN+		FIU	L 60-64	8-21 (4-14)	24 – Rowe	4 – Tied	3 – Rowe	E. A. Diddle Arena (1,010); Bowling Green, KY
*Non-conference game. ^{#}Rankings from AP Poll. (#) Tournament seedings in parentheses. All times are in Central.
