= 2025–26 Liberty Lady Flames basketball team =

American college basketball season

2025–26 Liberty Lady Flames basketball
- Conference: Conference USA
- Record: 18–13 (11–7 C-USA)
- Head coach: Alexis Sherard (1st season)
- Assistant coaches: Andrea "Andy" Bloodworth; Katie Mattera; Brad Palmer; Amber Lee; Emma Hess
- Home arena: Liberty Arena

2025–26 Conference USA women's basketball standings
	Conf.				Overall
Team	W		L	PCT	W		L	PCT
Louisiana Tech	17	–	1	.944	26	–	7	.788
FIU	12	–	6	.667	21	–	12	.636
Middle Tennessee	11	–	7	.611	17	–	16	.515
Sam Houston	11	–	7	.611	18	–	13	.581
Liberty	11	–	7	.611	18	–	13	.581
Missouri State †	11	–	7	.611	23	–	13	.639
Jacksonville State	9	–	9	.500	16	–	16	.500
Delaware	6	–	12	.333	13	–	19	.406
Kennesaw State	6	–	12	.333	13	–	17	.433
UTEP	5	–	13	.278	13	–	17	.433
New Mexico State	5	–	13	.278	9	–	21	.300
Western Kentucky	4	–	14	.222	8	–	21	.276
† 2026 CUSA tournament winner

The 2025–26 Liberty Lady Flames basketball team represents Liberty University during the 2025–26 NCAA Division I women's basketball season. The Lady Flames, led by first-year head coach Alexis Sherard, play their home games at Liberty Arena in Lynchburg, Virginia, as third-year members of Conference USA.

== Previous season ==
The Lady Flames finished the 2024–25 season 26–7, 16–2 in C-USA play, to finish as C-USA co-regular season champions, alongside Middle Tennessee. They defeated Sam Houston, Louisiana Tech, and Middle Tennessee to win the C-USA tournament championship, sending the Lady Flames to their first NCAA tournament appearance since 2018. In the tournament, they would receive the No. 13 seed in the Spokane Regional 4, where they would be defeated by No. 4 seed Kentucky in the First Round.

On August 28, 2025, longtime head coach Carey Green announced his retirement, ending his 26-year reign at the helm, with associate head coach Alexis Sherard being named the team's new head coach.

== Offseason ==
=== Departures ===
Name	Number	Pos.	Height	Year	Hometown	Reason for departure
Jordan Hodges	0	G	5'6"	Senior	Richmond, VA	Graduated
Pien Steenbergen	7	F	6'1"	(redshirt) Sophomore	Berlicum, NL	Transferred to Texas A&M
Brooke Moore	10	G	6'0"	Sophomore	Kennesaw, GA	Transferred to St. John's
Asia Boone	12	G	5'8"	Sophomore	San Diego, CA	Transferred to Kentucky
Emily Howard	14	C	6'5"	(redshirt) Junior	Vancouver, B.C	Transferred to Boise State
Anna Badosa	22	G	5'9"	(redshirt) Senior	Girona, ES	Graduated
Emma Hess	23	G	6'0"	Senior	Beavercreek, OH	Graduated
Bella Smuda	31	C	6'6"	(redshirt) Senior	Exton, PA	Graduated

=== Incoming transfers ===
Name	Number	Pos.	Height	Year	Hometown	Previous college
JaKayla Thompson	3	G	5'8"	Junior	Louisville, KY	Boston College
Lydie Mwamba	22	G	5'11"	Senior	Kinshasa, DRC	New Mexico

=== 2025 recruiting class ===
College recruiting information
Name	Hometown	School	Height	Weight	Commit date
Emma Leon; G	Barcelona, ES	Santa Pau Pifma	5 ft 6 in (1.68 m)	N/A	N/A
Emma Leon; G	Recruit ratings: No ratings found				
Zeynep Avci; G	Ankara, TR	TED Ankara College	6 ft 0 in (1.83 m)	N/A	N/A
Zeynep Avci; G	Recruit ratings: No ratings found				
Lynn Peters; C	Almelo, NL	Caland Lyceum	6 ft 3 in (1.91 m)	N/A	N/A
Lynn Peters; C	Recruit ratings: No ratings found				
Overall recruit ranking:
Note: In many cases, Scout, Rivals, 247Sports, On3, and ESPN may conflict in their listings of height and weight.; In these cases, the average was taken. ESPN grades are on a 100-point scale.; Sources: "2025 Team Ranking". Rivals.

== Preseason ==
On October 9, 2025, Conference USA released their preseason poll. Liberty was picked to finish second in the conference, with five first-place votes.

=== Preseason rankings ===
Conference USA Preseason Poll
Place	Team	Votes
1	Louisiana Tech	128 (5)
2	Liberty	125 (5)
3	Middle Tennessee	123 (2)
4	Missouri State	107
5	Western Kentucky	96
6	FIU	74
7	Sam Houston	59
T-8	UTEP	57
T-8	Kennesaw State	57
10	New Mexico State	51
11	Delaware	36
12	Jacksonville State	23
(#) first-place votes

=== Preseason All-CUSA Team ===
Preseason All-CUSA Team
Player	Position	Year
Avery Mills	Guard	Sophomore
Emmy Stout	Center	Sophomore

== Roster ==
2025–26 Liberty Lady Flames women's basketball team
Players
Coaches

Pos.	#	Name	Height	Year	Previous school	Hometown
G	1	Avery Mills	5 ft 9 in (1.75 m)	So	Liberty Christian Academy	Lynchburg, Virginia
G	3	JaKayla Thompson	5 ft 8 in (1.73 m)	Jr	Boston College	Louisville, Kentucky
G	4	Claudia Acin	5 ft 8 in (1.73 m)	Jr	Les Alzines	Girona, Spain
F	6	Ify Nwaobi	6 ft 2 in (1.88 m)	RS Fr	Edge School	Calgary, Alberta
F	11	Caroline Shiery	6 ft 3 in (1.91 m)	RS Jr	Central Dauphin High School	Harrisburg, Pennsylvania
G	15	Maleah Alexander	5 ft 7 in (1.7 m)	RS Fr	Cooper High School	Burlington, Kentucky
C	17	Emmy Stout	6 ft 3 in (1.91 m)	So	Liberty Christian Academy	San Diego, California
F	21	Elisabeth Aegisdottir	6 ft 2 in (1.88 m)	Jr	Fjolbrautarskoli Suournesja	Grindavík, Iceland
G	22	Lydie Mwamba	5 ft 11 in (1.8 m)	Sr	New Mexico	Kinshasa, Democratic Republic of the Congo
G	24	Emma Leon	5 ft 6 in (1.68 m)	Fr	Santa Pau Pifma	Barcelona, Spain
G	25	Zeynep Avci	6 ft 0 in (1.83 m)	Fr	TED Ankara College	Ankara, Turkey
C	33	Lynn Peters	6 ft 3 in (1.91 m)	Fr	Caland Lyceum	Almelo, Netherlands

Head coach

- Alexis Sherard (Saint Michael's)

Assistant coach(es)

- Andrea "Andy" Bloodworth (Calvin)
- Katie Mattera (Liberty)
- Brad Palmer (Cedarville)
- Amber Lee (Maryville)
- Emma Hess (Liberty)

Legend

- (C) Team captain
- (S) Suspended
- (I) Ineligible
- (W) Walk-on
- Injured
- Current redshirt

Roster
Last update: February 9, 2026

== Schedule and results ==
Date time, TV	Rank^{#}	Opponent^{#}	Result	Record	High points	High rebounds	High assists	Site (attendance) city, state
Non-conference regular season
November 4, 2025*; 7:00 pm, ESPN+		Frostburg State	W 78–49	1–0	16 – Stout	11 – Stout	4 – Tied	Liberty Arena (971); Lynchburg, VA
November 7, 2025*; 2:00 pm, ESPN+		East Carolina	W 69–53	2–0	21 – Mills	10 – Mills	7 – Acin	Liberty Arena (1,050); Lynchburg, VA
November 12, 2025*; 6:00 pm, ESPN+		at James Madison	L 61–74	2–1	16 – Tied	13 – Nwaobi	3 – Aegisdottir	Atlantic Union Bank Center (1,971); Harrisonburg, VA
November 16, 2025*; 2:00 pm, ESPN+		No. 15 Duke	L 57–71	2–2	21 – Stout	11 – Nwaobi	6 – Thompson	Liberty Arena (2,404); Lynchburg, VA
November 26, 2025*; 2:00 pm, ESPN+		UVA Wise	W 80–35	3–2	17 – Peters	10 – Tied	5 – Thompson	Liberty Arena (828); Lynchburg, VA
November 29, 2025*; 3:30 pm, ESPN+		vs. Duquesne; Navy Classic	W 67−60	4−2	18 – Mills	13 – Nwaobi	10 – Acin	Alumni Hall (853); Annapolis, MD
November 30, 2025*; 3:30 pm, ESPN+		vs. Manhattan; Navy Classic	W 68−56	5−2	24 – Mills	11 – Nwaobi	4 – Tied	Alumni Hall (673); Annapolis, MD
December 7, 2025*; 3:00 pm, ESPN+		at George Mason	W 74–73	6–2	24 – Mills	12 – Nwaobi	8 – Acin	EagleBank Arena (776); Fairfax, VA
December 13, 2025*; 2:00 pm, ESPN+		Richmond	L 61–76	6–3	16 – Nwaobi	13 – Nwaobi	3 – Acin	Liberty Arena (1,011); Lynchburg, VA
December 20, 2025*; 12:30 am, YouTube		vs. Hawai'i; Maui Classic	L 58–67	6–4	13 – Tied	5 – Tied	4 – Thompson	Seabury Hall (1,357); Makawao, HI
December 20, 2025*; 11:00 pm, YouTube		vs. Oregon State; Maui Classic	L 57–64	6–5	14 – Tied	7 – Nwaobi	2 – Acin	Seabury Hall (1,299); Makawao, HI
C-USA regular season
January 2, 2026; 8:00 pm, ESPN+		at New Mexico State	W 67–62	7–5 (1–0)	25 – Mills	9 – Tied	3 – Tied	Pan American Center (235); Las Cruces, NM
January 4, 2026; 2:00 pm, ESPN+		at UTEP	W 86−66	8−5 (2–0)	22 – Mills	7 – Nwaobi	7 – Acin	Don Haskins Center (795); El Paso, TX
January 8, 2026; 5:00 pm, ESPN+		Sam Houston	L 53–59	8–6 (2–1)	11 – Tied	16 – Nwaobi	4 – Acin	Liberty Arena (864); Lynchburg, VA
January 11, 2026; 1:00 pm, ESPNU		Louisiana Tech	L 72–86	8–7 (2–2)	20 – Stout	6 – Stout	7 – Acin	Liberty Arena (1,042); Lynchburg, VA
January 17, 2026; 5:00 pm, ESPN+		at Delaware	L 69–76	8–8 (2–3)	21 – Stout	7 – Tied	4 – Acin	Bob Carpenter Center (2,600); Newark, DE
January 22, 2026; 7:30 pm, ESPN+		at Western Kentucky	W 55–53	9–8 (3–3)	19 – Stout	11 – Stout	7 – Acin	E. A. Diddle Arena (767); Bowling Green, KY
January 23, 2026; 7:30 pm, ESPN+		at Middle Tennessee	L 54–63	9–9 (3–4)	12 – Aegisdottir	11 – Aegisdottir	3 – Tied	Murphy Center (3,411); Murfreesboro, TN
January 30, 2026; 7:00 pm, ESPN+		FIU	L 61–74	9–10 (3–5)	13 – Thompson	9 – Nwaobi	3 – Tied	Liberty Arena (928); Lynchburg, VA
February 1, 2026; 2:00 pm, ESPN+		Missouri State	W 60–52	10–10 (4–5)	13 – Acin	10 – Nwaobi	4 – Acin	Liberty Arena (1,060); Lynchburg, VA
February 5, 2026; 7:30 pm, ESPN+		at Jacksonville State	W 60–55	11–10 (5–5)	27 – Mills	15 – Nwaobi	5 – Thompson	Pete Mathews Coliseum (573); Jacksonville, AL
February 7, 2026; 2:00 pm, ESPN+		at Kennesaw State	L 58–64	11–11 (5–6)	18 – Stout	11 – Nwaobi	4 – Acin	VyStar Arena (822); Kennesaw, GA
February 12, 2026; 5:00 pm, ESPN+		UTEP	W 58–48	12–11 (6–6)	16 – Stout	10 – Stout	4 – Thompson	Liberty Arena (849); Lynchburg, VA
February 14, 2026; 2:00 pm, ESPN+		New Mexico State	W 67–42	13–11 (7–6)	17 – Acin	11 – Nwaobi	4 – Leon	Liberty Arena (1,131); Lynchburg, VA
February 19, 2026; 7:30 pm, ESPN+		at Missouri State	W 55-43	14–11 (8–6)	15 – Stout	12 – Nwaobi	3 – Thompson	Great Southern Bank Arena (2,225); Springfield, MO
February 21, 2026; 12:00 pm, ESPN+		at FIU	L 45-66	14–12 (8–7)	12 – Stout	8 – Nwaobi	4 – Stout	Ocean Bank Convocation Center (214); Miami, FL
February 26, 2026; 7:00 pm, ESPN+		Middle Tennessee	W 65-37	15–12 (9–7)	14 – Stout	10 – Nwaobi	4 – Acin	Liberty Arena (1,035); Lynchburg, VA
February 28, 2026; 2:00 pm, ESPN+		Western Kentucky	W 60–54	16–12 (10–7)	17 – Mills	10 – Thompson	6 – Thompson	Liberty Arena (1,212); Lynchburg, VA
March 6, 2026; 7:00 pm, ESPN+		Delaware	W 74-64	17–12 (11–7)	18 – Stout	6 – Tied	8 – Acin	Liberty Arena (1,518); Lynchburg, VA
C-USA tournament
March 12, 2026; 12:30 pm, ESPN+	(5)	vs. (4) Sam Houston; Quarterfinals	W 89-57	18–12	22 – Nwaobi	7 – Tied	5 – Thompson	Propst Arena (2,346); Huntsville, AL
March 13, 2026; 6:30 pm, ESPN+	(5)	vs. (1) Louisiana Tech; Semifinals	L 48-61	18-13	16 – Stout	10 – Aegisdottir	6 – Mills	Propst Arena (2,035); Huntsville, AL
*Non-conference game. ^{#}Rankings from AP Poll. (#) Tournament seedings in parentheses. All times are in Eastern.
