= 2025–26 New Mexico State Aggies women's basketball team =

American college basketball season

2025–26 New Mexico State Aggies women's basketball
- Conference: Conference USA
- Record: 9–21 (5–13 C-USA)
- Head coach: Jody Adams (4th season)
- Associate head coach: James Frey
- Assistant coaches: Preston Planells; Kayla Tucker; Myron Brown
- Home arena: Pan American Center

2025–26 Conference USA women's basketball standings
	Conf.				Overall
Team	W		L	PCT	W		L	PCT
Louisiana Tech	17	–	1	.944	26	–	7	.788
FIU	12	–	6	.667	21	–	12	.636
Middle Tennessee	11	–	7	.611	17	–	16	.515
Sam Houston	11	–	7	.611	18	–	13	.581
Liberty	11	–	7	.611	18	–	13	.581
Missouri State †	11	–	7	.611	23	–	13	.639
Jacksonville State	9	–	9	.500	16	–	16	.500
Delaware	6	–	12	.333	13	–	19	.406
Kennesaw State	6	–	12	.333	13	–	17	.433
UTEP	5	–	13	.278	13	–	17	.433
New Mexico State	5	–	13	.278	9	–	21	.300
Western Kentucky	4	–	14	.222	8	–	21	.276
† 2026 CUSA tournament winner

The 2025–26 New Mexico State Aggies women's basketball team represents New Mexico State University during the 2025–26 NCAA Division I women's basketball season. The Aggies, led by fourth-year head coach Jody Adams, play their home games at the Pan American Center in Las Cruces, New Mexico, as third-year members of Conference USA.

== Previous season ==
The Aggies finished the 2024–25 season 18–16, 10–8 in C-USA play, to finish in fourth place. They were defeated by Louisiana Tech in the quarterfinals of the C-USA tournament. They received an at-large bid to the WNIT, where they would defeat Pacific in the first round, before falling to North Dakota State in the second round.

== Preseason ==
On October 9, 2025, Conference USA released their preseason poll. New Mexico State was picked to finish tenth in the conference.

=== Preseason rankings ===
Conference USA Preseason Poll
Place	Team	Votes
1	Louisiana Tech	128 (5)
2	Liberty	125 (5)
3	Middle Tennessee	123 (2)
4	Missouri State	107
5	Western Kentucky	96
6	FIU	74
7	Sam Houston	59
T-8	UTEP	57
T-8	Kennesaw State	57
10	New Mexico State	51
11	Delaware	36
12	Jacksonville State	23
(#) first-place votes

=== Preseason All-CUSA Team ===
No players were named to the Preseason All-CUSA Team.

== Roster ==
2025–26 New Mexico State Aggies women's basketball team
Players
Coaches

Pos.	#	Name	Height	Year	Previous school	Hometown
G	1	Imani Warren	5 ft 10 in (1.78 m)	Jr	Rufus King High School	Milwaukee, Wisconsin
G	2	Loes Rozing	5 ft 10 in (1.78 m)	GS	South Georgia Tech	Heiloo, Netherlands
G	3	Keira Hudson	5 ft 5 in (1.65 m)	Fr	Barker College	Central Coast, Australia
G	4	DeAvion Wilson	5 ft 5 in (1.65 m)	Fr	C.E. King High School	Houston, Texas
F	5	Morane Dossou	5 ft 10 in (1.78 m)	Jr	Dodge City Community College	Charleville-Mézières, France
G	7	Nikki Stanic	5 ft 10 in (1.78 m)	Jr	St. Petersburg College	Melbourne, Australia
F	16	Marta Guilera	6 ft 1 in (1.85 m)	Jr	Georgian Court	La Granada, Spain
G	22	Emma Christiano	5 ft 3 in (1.6 m)	Jr	New Mexico Highlands	Las Cruces, New Mexico
F	23	Iyana Beh	6 ft 0 in (1.83 m)	Jr	Snow College	Murray, Utah
F	24	Lucía Yenes	6 ft 0 in (1.83 m)	Sr	Baloncesto Torrelodones	Madrid, Spain
F	27	Lucia Lara	6 ft 3 in (1.91 m)	So	Butler Community College	Córdoba, Spain
G	30	Anna Csenyi	5 ft 9 in (1.75 m)	Sr	Casper College	Szolnok, Hungary
F	33	Senoj Jones	6 ft 0 in (1.83 m)	Fr	Tyler Legacy High School	Tyler, Texas
G		Seda Gabrielyan	5 ft 10 in (1.78 m)	RS Fr	Hatis Yerevan	Yerevan, Armenia

Head coach

- Jody Adams (Tennessee)

Assistant coach(es)

- James Frey (Troy)
- Preston Planells (Utah)
- Kayla Tucker (Alabama State)
- Myron Brown (Phoenix)

Legend

- (C) Team captain
- (S) Suspended
- (I) Ineligible
- (W) Walk-on
- Injured
- Current redshirt

Roster
Last update: February 10, 2026

== Schedule and results ==
Date time, TV	Rank^{#}	Opponent^{#}	Result	Record	High points	High rebounds	High assists	Site (attendance) city, state
Exhibition
October 26, 2025*; 2:00 pm		Cochise	W 70–35	–	14 – Warren	7 – Yenes	6 – Christiano	Pan American Center (232); Las Cruces, NM
Non-conference regular season
November 4, 2025*; 8:00 pm, B1G+		at No. 18 USC	L 48–87	0–1	27 – Yenes	5 – Yenes	4 – Christiano	Galen Center (3,971); Los Angeles, CA
November 11, 2025*; 5:00 pm, ESPN+		New Mexico Highlands	W 78–61	1–1	23 – Yenes	11 – Warren	6 – Warren	Pan American Center (1,238); Las Cruces, NM
November 16, 2025*; 2:00 pm, ESPN+		New Mexico; Rio Grande Rivalry	L 45–77	1–2	11 – Yenes	8 – Yenes	3 – Tied	Pan American Center (1,408); Las Cruces, NM
November 24, 2025*; 12:00 pm, ESPN+		at San Diego	L 48–57	1–3	20 – Warren	9 – Lara	4 – Yenes	Jenny Craig Pavilion (357); San Diego, CA
November 27, 2025*; 12:00 pm, YouTube		vs. Charleston; Big Easy Classic	L 42–72	1–4	8 – Yenes	14 – Dossou	4 – Wilson	Alario Center (142); Westwego, LA
November 28, 2025*; 1:30 pm, YouTube		vs. Fresno State; Big Easy Classic	L 49−64	1−5	13 – Yenes	6 – Tied	6 – Warren	Alario Center (111); Westwego, LA
December 4, 2025*; 12:00 pm, ESPN+		at Southern Utah	L 59−69	1−6	15 – Warren	11 – Dossou	2 – Tied	America First Event Center (831); Cedar City, UT
December 6, 2025*; 2:00 pm, ESPN+		at Utah Tech	W 58–55	2–6	16 – Hudson	12 – Dossou	6 – Christiano	Burns Arena (538); St. George, UT
December 14, 2025*; 5:00 pm, ESPN+		Western New Mexico	W 76–44	3–6	14 – Yenes	8 – Dossou	6 – Tied	Pan American Center (462); Las Cruces, NM
December 16, 2025*; 6:00 pm, ESPN+		UC Irvine	L 66–83	3–7	22 – Yenes	7 – Yenes	3 – Tied	Pan American Center (344); Las Cruces, NM
December 20, 2025*; 3:00 pm, ESPN+		at Saint Mary's	L 59–70	3–8	16 – Warren	17 – Dossou	6 – Dossou	University Credit Union Pavilion (336); Moraga, CA
December 29, 2025*; 5:00 pm, ESPN+		Eastern New Mexico	W 52–48 ^{OT}	4–8	18 – Warren	16 – Dossou	4 – Warren	Pan American Center (322); Las Cruces, NM
C-USA regular season
January 2, 2026; 6:00 pm, ESPN+		Liberty	L 62−67	4−9 (0–1)	29 – Warren	7 – Yenes	5 – Warren	Pan American Center (235); Las Cruces, NM
January 4, 2026; 2:00 pm, ESPN+		Delaware	W 64–57 ^{OT}	5–9 (1–1)	11 – Tied	12 – Dossou	3 – Wilson	Pan American Center (468); Las Cruces, NM
January 8, 2026; 5:30 pm, ESPN+		at Western Kentucky	W 70–67	6–9 (2–1)	26 – Yenes	8 – Dossou	2 – Tied	E. A. Diddle Arena (683); Bowling Green, KY
January 10, 2026; 11:00 am, ESPN+		at Middle Tennessee	L 51–88	6–10 (2–2)	11 – Tied	9 – Yenes	2 – Christiano	Murphy Center (3,605); Murfreesboro, TN
January 15, 2026; 6:00 pm, ESPN+		FIU	L 74–83	6–11 (2–3)	19 – Yenes	6 – Yenes	5 – Wilson	Pan American Center (825); Las Cruces, NM
January 17, 2026; 12:00 pm, ESPN+		Missouri State	W 63–56	7–11 (3–3)	17 – Warren	13 – Dossou	4 – Wilson	Pan American Center (959); Las Cruces, NM
January 22, 2026; 5:30 pm, ESPN+		at Jacksonville State	L 46–57	7–12 (3–4)	13 – Yenes	14 – Dossou	2 – Tied	Pete Mathews Coliseum (464); Jacksonville, AL
January 24, 2026; 10:00 am, ESPN+		at Kennesaw State	L 55–70	7–13 (3–5)	18 – Warren	9 – Dossou	2 – Tied	VyStar Arena (545); Kennesaw, GA
January 31, 2026; 2:00 pm, ESPN+		at UTEP; Battle of I-10	L 69–79	7–14 (3–6)	21 – Warren	9 – Warren	4 – Wilson	Don Haskins Center (1,752); El Paso, TX
February 5, 2026; 6:00 pm, ESPN+		Sam Houston	W 65–57	8–14 (4–6)	17 – Yenes	8 – Dossou	6 – Warren	Pan American Center (1,052); Las Cruces, NM
February 7, 2026; 12:00 pm, ESPN+		Louisiana Tech	L 58–77	8–15 (4–7)	17 – Warren	6 – Yenes	3 – Yenes	Pan American Center (787); Las Cruces, NM
February 12, 2026; 5:00 pm, ESPN+		at Delaware	L 62–65	8–16 (4–8)	18 – Yenes	7 – Tied	4 – Christiano	Bob Carpenter Center (1,196); Newark, DE
February 14, 2026; 12:00 pm, ESPN+		at Liberty	L 42–67	8–17 (4–9)	11 – Warren	5 – Tied	3 – Wilson	Liberty Arena (1,131); Lynchburg, VA
February 21, 2026; 2:00 pm, ESPN+		UTEP; Battle of I-10	L 58–69	8–18 (4–10)	15 – Hudson	7 – Yenes	5 – Christiano	Pan American Center (712); Las Cruces, NM
February 26, 2026; 6:00 pm, ESPN+		Kennesaw State	W 52–40	9–18 (5–10)	21 – Yenes	10 – Lara	4 – Tied	Pan American Center (863); Las Cruces, NM
February 28, 2026; 2:00 pm, ESPN+		Jacksonville State	L 38–57	9–19 (5–11)	12 – Jones	11 – Dossou	5 – Christiano	Pan American Center (904); Las Cruces, NM
March 5, 2026; 5:30 pm, ESPN+		at Louisiana Tech	L 47-88	9-20 (5-12)	12 – Warren	7 – Dossou	5 – Christiano	Thomas Assembly Center (1,442); Ruston, LA
March 7, 2026; 1:00 pm, ESPN+		at Sam Houston	L 55-71	9-21 (5-13)	11 – Csenyi	8 – Dossou	4 – Wilson	Bernard Johnson Coliseum (462); Huntsville, TX
*Non-conference game. ^{#}Rankings from AP Poll. (#) Tournament seedings in parentheses. All times are in Mountain.
