= 2025–26 Sam Houston Bearkats women's basketball team =

American college basketball season

2025–26 Sam Houston Bearkats women's basketball
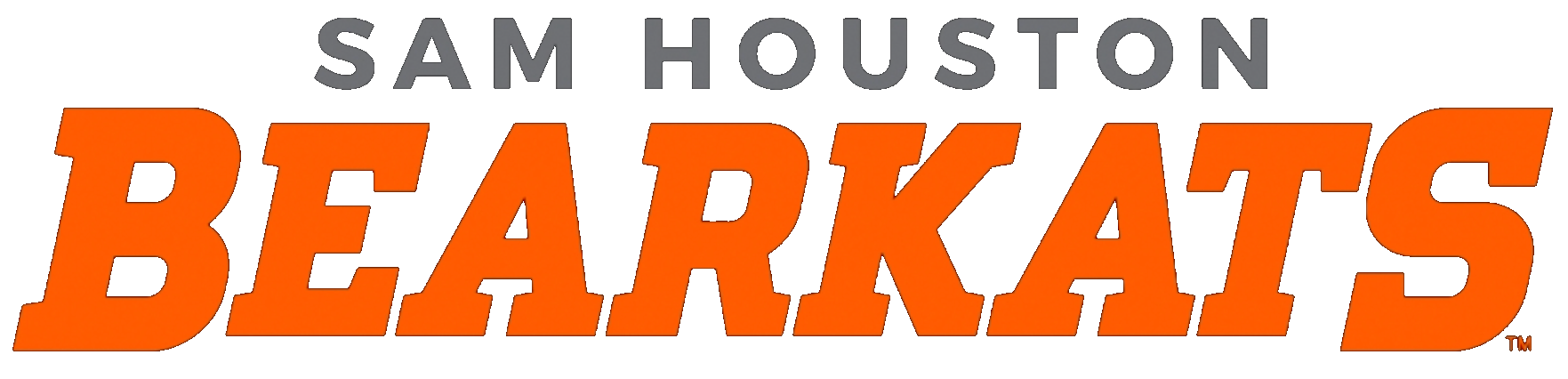

WNIT, First Round
- Conference: Conference USA
- Record: 18–13 (11–7 C-USA)
- Head coach: Ravon Justice (7th season)
- Assistant coaches: Brittany Mason; Ayriell Robinson
- Home arena: Bernard Johnson Coliseum

2025–26 Conference USA women's basketball standings
	Conf.				Overall
Team	W		L	PCT	W		L	PCT
Louisiana Tech	17	–	1	.944	26	–	7	.788
FIU	12	–	6	.667	21	–	12	.636
Middle Tennessee	11	–	7	.611	17	–	16	.515
Sam Houston	11	–	7	.611	18	–	13	.581
Liberty	11	–	7	.611	18	–	13	.581
Missouri State †	11	–	7	.611	23	–	13	.639
Jacksonville State	9	–	9	.500	16	–	16	.500
Delaware	6	–	12	.333	13	–	19	.406
Kennesaw State	6	–	12	.333	13	–	17	.433
UTEP	5	–	13	.278	13	–	17	.433
New Mexico State	5	–	13	.278	9	–	21	.300
Western Kentucky	4	–	14	.222	8	–	21	.276
† 2026 CUSA tournament winner

The 2025–26 Sam Houston Bearkats women's basketball team represents Sam Houston State University during the 2025–26 NCAA Division I women's basketball season. The Bearkats, led by seventh-year head coach Ravon Justice, play their home games at the Bernard Johnson Coliseum in Huntsville, Texas, as third-year members of Conference USA.

== Previous season ==
The Bearkats finished the 2024–25 season 13–17, 5–13 in C-USA play, to finish in eighth place. They defeated Jacksonville State, before falling to top-seeded and eventual tournament champions Liberty in the quarterfinals of the C-USA tournament.

== Preseason ==
On October 9, 2025, Conference USA released their preseason poll. Sam Houston was picked to finish seventh in the conference.

=== Preseason rankings ===
Conference USA Preseason Poll
Place	Team	Votes
1	Louisiana Tech	128 (5)
2	Liberty	125 (5)
3	Middle Tennessee	123 (2)
4	Missouri State	107
5	Western Kentucky	96
6	FIU	74
7	Sam Houston	59
T-8	UTEP	57
T-8	Kennesaw State	57
10	New Mexico State	51
11	Delaware	36
12	Jacksonville State	23
(#) first-place votes

=== Preseason All-CUSA Team ===
Preseason All-CUSA Team
Player	Position	Year
Deborah Ogayemi	Forward	(redshirt) Senior

== Roster ==
2025–26 Sam Houston Bearkats women's basketball team
Players
Coaches

Pos.	#	Name	Height	Year	Previous school	Hometown
G	1	Kaylie Carr	5 ft 10 in (1.78 m)	Fr	Legion Preparatory Academy	Oxford, Mississippi
G	2	Tianna Mathis	5 ft 8 in (1.73 m)	Sr	Texas Southern	Bryan, Texas
G	3	Kelis Grant	5 ft 7 in (1.7 m)	Jr	Cedar Hill High School	Cedar Hill, Texas
G	4	Fanta Kone	5 ft 7 in (1.7 m)	Sr	Tyler Junior College	Bamako, Mali
G	5	Aysia Ward-Strong	5 ft 10 in (1.78 m)	GS	McLennan Community College	Dallas, Texas
G	7	Annika Corcoran	5 ft 5 in (1.65 m)	GS	Detroit Mercy	Chardon, Ohio
F	8	Deborah Ogayemi	6 ft 0 in (1.83 m)	RS Sr	UT Rio Grande Valley	Waterford, Ireland
G/F	10	Alaisha Brown	5 ft 10 in (1.78 m)	Jr	Denver	Arlington, Texas
G	11	Esther Rodellar	5 ft 10 in (1.78 m)	Jr	Siena	Barcelona, Spain
F	15	Nyla Inmon	6 ft 0 in (1.83 m)	Sr	Kilgore College	Tyler, Texas
F	21	Blessing Okoh	6 ft 0 in (1.83 m)	GS	Winthrop	Houston, Texas
G	23	Bryana Block	5 ft 6 in (1.68 m)	RS Jr	Liberty-Eylau High School	Texarkana, Texas
G	24	Whitney Dunn	5 ft 9 in (1.75 m)	Sr	Alabama State	Chicago, Illinois
C	25	Lea Salinas Beamen	6 ft 4 in (1.93 m)	So	Liberty High School	Brentwood, California

Head coach

- Ravon Justice (USAO)

Assistant coach(es)

- Brittany Mason (Houston)
- Ayriell Robinson (Saint Louis)

Legend

- (C) Team captain
- (S) Suspended
- (I) Ineligible
- (W) Walk-on
- Injured
- Current redshirt

Roster
Last update: February 6, 2026

== Schedule and results ==
Date time, TV	Rank^{#}	Opponent^{#}	Result	Record	High points	High rebounds	High assists	Site (attendance) city, state
Non-conference regular season
November 3, 2025*; 4:00 pm, ESPN+		Southwestern Christian	W 58–39	1–0	13 – Inmon	12 – Ward-Strong	3 – Tied	Bernard Johnson Coliseum (469); Huntsville, TX
November 9, 2025*; 7:00 pm, ESPN+		at No. 17 TCU	L 46–88	1–1	13 – Kone	8 – Ogayemi	2 – Tied	Schollmaier Arena (2,302); Fort Worth, TX
November 12, 2025*; 4:00 pm		at Arkansas–Pine Bluff	W 78–44	2–1	21 – Inmon	8 – Ogayemi	7 – Kone	H.O. Clemmons Arena (325); Pine Bluff, AR
November 17, 2025*; 6:30 pm, ESPN+		Prairie View A&M	W 77–49	3–1	16 – Tied	11 – Ward-Strong	5 – Ward-Strong	Bernard Johnson Coliseum (570); Huntsville, TX
November 20, 2025*; 6:30 pm, ESPN+		Louisiana–Monroe	W 57−34	4−1	22 – Kone	7 – Ward-Strong	3 – Corcoran	Bernard Johnson Coliseum (432); Huntsville, TX
November 25, 2025*; 6:30 pm, ESPN+		North American	W 92−43	5−1	14 – Block	6 – Inmon	6 – Tied	Bernard Johnson Coliseum (409); Huntsville, TX
December 3, 2025*; 5:30 pm, ESPN+		at Rice	L 50–66	5–2	15 – Dunn	11 – Ogayemi	4 – Kone	Tudor Fieldhouse (765); Houston, TX
December 16, 2025*; 6:00 pm, SECN+		at Alabama	L 36–73	5–3	14 – Ogayemi	6 – Ward-Strong	4 – Kone	Coleman Coliseum (2,224); Tuscaloosa, AL
December 19, 2025*; 5:00 pm, ESPN+		SMU	L 69–73	5–4	13 – Tied	10 – Ogayemi	7 – Kone	Bernard Johnson Coliseum (394); Huntsville, TX
December 22, 2025*; 12:00 pm, ESPN+		Northern Colorado	W 65–56	6–4	17 – Inmon	8 – Ogayemi	5 – Tied	Bernard Johnson Coliseum (424); Huntsville, TX
December 28, 2025*; 12:00 pm, ESPN+		Dallas	W 110–38	7–4	22 – Kone	9 – Ward-Strong	8 – Kone	Bernard Johnson Coliseum (99); Huntsville, TX
C-USA regular season
January 2, 2026; 6:30 pm, ESPN+		at Louisiana Tech	W 67−64	8−4 (1–0)	19 – Kone	10 – Ogayemi	5 – Kone	Thomas Assembly Center (1,431); Ruston, LA
January 8, 2026; 4:00 pm, ESPN+		at Liberty	W 59–53	9–4 (2–0)	17 – Ogayemi	11 – Ogayemi	4 – Kone	Liberty Arena (864); Lynchburg, VA
January 10, 2026; 1:00 pm, ESPN+		at Delaware	W 73–65 ^{OT}	10–4 (3–0)	21 – Dunn	10 – Ogayemi	10 – Kone	Bob Carpenter Center (797); Newark, DE
January 15, 2026; 6:30 pm, ESPN+		Western Kentucky	W 50–38	11–4 (4–0)	16 – Kone	6 – Tied	4 – Kone	Bernard Johnson Coliseum (520); Huntsville, TX
January 17, 2026; 1:00 pm, ESPN+		Middle Tennessee	L 67–68	11–5 (4–1)	17 – Dunn	6 – Dunn	6 – Kone	Bernard Johnson Coliseum (525); Huntsville, TX
January 22, 2026; 6:00 pm, ESPN+		at FIU	L 60–66	11–6 (4–2)	14 – Ogayemi	10 – Ward-Strong	8 – Kone	Ocean Bank Convocation Center (127); Miami, FL
January 29, 2026; 6:30 pm, ESPN+		Jacksonville State	W 70–51	12–6 (5–2)	16 – Kone	11 – Tied	4 – Inmon	Bernard Johnson Coliseum (555); Huntsville, TX
January 31, 2026; 2:00 pm, ESPN+		Kennesaw State	W 62–57	13–6 (6–2)	18 – Ogayemi	9 – Tied	4 – Dunn	Bernard Johnson Coliseum (515); Huntsville, TX
February 5, 2026; 7:00 pm, ESPN+		at New Mexico State	L 57–65	13–7 (6–3)	19 – Ogayemi	10 – Ogayemi	2 – Tied	Pan American Center (1,052); Las Cruces, NM
February 7, 2026; 3:00 pm, ESPN+		at UTEP	W 70–58	14–7 (7–3)	19 – Ogayemi	7 – Inmon	3 – Tied	Don Haskins Center (1,013); El Paso, TX
February 12, 2026; 6:30 pm, ESPN+		Missouri State	W 74–67	15–7 (8–3)	19 – Kone	6 – Ogayemi	8 – Kone	Bernard Johnson Coliseum (545); Huntsville, TX
February 14, 2026; 1:00 pm, ESPN+		FIU	L 65–67	15–8 (8–4)	18 – Dunn	5 – Tied	8 – Kone	Bernard Johnson Coliseum (365); Huntsville, TX
February 19, 2026; 6:00 pm, ESPN+		at Kennesaw State	W 72–66	16–8 (9–4)	22 – Dunn	9 – Inmon	3 – Tied	VyStar Arena (508); Kennesaw, GA
February 21, 2026; 2:30 pm, ESPN+		at Jacksonville State	L 68–69	16–9 (9–5)	20 – Kone	12 – Ward-Strong	4 – Kone	Pete Mathews Coliseum (699); Jacksonville, AL
February 24, 2026; 6:30 pm, ESPN+		at Missouri State	L 55–60	16–10 (9–6)	12 – Kone	8 – Ward-Strong	3 – Tied	Great Southern Bank Arena (2,259); Springfield, MO
February 28, 2026; 2:00 pm, ESPN+		Louisiana Tech	L 60–75	16–11 (9–7)	16 – Dunn	10 – Ward-Strong	9 – Kone	Bernard Johnson Coliseum (738); Huntsville, TX
March 5, 2026; 6:30 pm, ESPN+		UTEP	W 71-59	17-11 (10-7)	18 – Kone	8 – Tied	6 – Kone	Bernard Johnson Coliseum (378); Huntsville, TX
March 7, 2026; 2:00 pm, ESPN+		New Mexico State	W 71-55	18-11 (11-7)	23 – Tied	8 – Ogayemi	5 – Tied	Bernard Johnson Coliseum (462); Huntsville, TX
C-USA tournament
March 12, 2026; 11:30 am, ESPN+	(4)	vs. (5) Liberty; Quarterfinals	L 57-89	18-12	20 – Dunn	6 – Dunn	8 – Kone	Propst Arena (2,346); Huntsville, AL
WNIT
March 19, 2026; 8:00 pm, ESPN+		at Portland; First Round	L 59-62	18-13	18 – Inmon	7 – Kone	7 – Kone	Chiles Center (502); Portland, OR
*Non-conference game. ^{#}Rankings from AP Poll. (#) Tournament seedings in parentheses. All times are in Central.
