= 2025–26 Kennesaw State Owls women's basketball team =

American college basketball season

2025–26 Kennesaw State Owls women's basketball
- Conference: Conference USA
- Record: 13–17 (6–12 C-USA)
- Head coach: Octavia Blue (5th season)
- Associate head coach: Keisha McClinic
- Assistant coach: Chris Straker
- Home arena: VyStar Arena

2025–26 Conference USA women's basketball standings
	Conf.				Overall
Team	W		L	PCT	W		L	PCT
Louisiana Tech	17	–	1	.944	26	–	7	.788
FIU	12	–	6	.667	21	–	12	.636
Middle Tennessee	11	–	7	.611	17	–	16	.515
Sam Houston	11	–	7	.611	18	–	13	.581
Liberty	11	–	7	.611	18	–	13	.581
Missouri State †	11	–	7	.611	23	–	13	.639
Jacksonville State	9	–	9	.500	16	–	16	.500
Delaware	6	–	12	.333	13	–	19	.406
Kennesaw State	6	–	12	.333	13	–	17	.433
UTEP	5	–	13	.278	13	–	17	.433
New Mexico State	5	–	13	.278	9	–	21	.300
Western Kentucky	4	–	14	.222	8	–	21	.276
† 2026 CUSA tournament winner

The 2025–26 Kennesaw State Owls women's basketball team represented Kennesaw State University during the 2025–26 NCAA Division I women's basketball season. The Owls, led by fifth-year head coach Octavia Blue, played their home games at VyStar Arena in Kennesaw, Georgia, as second-year members of Conference USA.

== Previous season ==
The Owls finished the 2024–25 season 13–18, 7–11 in C-USA play, to finish in a tie for sixth place. They defeated UTEP, before falling to Middle Tennessee in the quarterfinals of the C-USA tournament.

== Preseason ==
On October 9, 2025, Conference USA released their preseason poll. Kennesaw State was picked to finish tied for eighth in the conference.

=== Preseason rankings ===
Conference USA Preseason Poll
Place	Team	Votes
1	Louisiana Tech	128 (5)
2	Liberty	125 (5)
3	Middle Tennessee	123 (2)
4	Missouri State	107
5	Western Kentucky	96
6	FIU	74
7	Sam Houston	59
T-8	UTEP	57
T-8	Kennesaw State	57
10	New Mexico State	51
11	Delaware	36
12	Jacksonville State	23
(#) first-place votes

=== Preseason All-CUSA Team ===
Preseason All-CUSA Team
Player	Position	Year
Keyarah Berry	Guard	Graduate student

== Roster ==
2025–26 Kennesaw State Owls women's basketball team
Players
Coaches

Pos.	#	Name	Height	Year	Previous school	Hometown
G	0	Kailyn Fields	5 ft 6 in (1.68 m)	Jr	The Galloway School	Atlanta, Georgia
G	1	Marihya Hart	5 ft 8 in (1.73 m)	Jr	Jackson State Community College	Memphis, Tennessee
F	2	Trynce Taylor	6 ft 1 in (1.85 m)	RS So	St. Francis School	Alpharetta, Georgia
F	4	Fanta Daffe	5 ft 10 in (1.78 m)	GS	Saint Francis (PA)	Paris, France
F	8	Emaya Lewis	6 ft 3 in (1.91 m)	So	Florida Atlantic	Loganville, Georgia
G	10	Gabriela Bendeck-Giron	5 ft 4 in (1.63 m)	Sr	Pensacola State College	Barranquilla, Colombia
G	12	Kaelyn Flowers	5 ft 6 in (1.68 m)	So	Florida Gulf Coast	Murfreesboro, Tennessee
G	13	Shania Nichols	5 ft 7 in (1.7 m)	Jr	IU Indy	Saint Paul, Minnesota
G	21	Keyarah Berry	5 ft 9 in (1.75 m)	GS	Indiana	Rockmart, Georgia
F	22	Latazia Williamson	6 ft 1 in (1.85 m)	Jr	Memphis	Nashville, Tennessee
F	23	TaTianna Stovall	6 ft 1 in (1.85 m)	Fr	Bradley Central High School	Cleveland, Tennessee
G	25	Madyson Elliott	5 ft 10 in (1.78 m)	Fr	East Nashville Magnet High School	Memphis, Tennessee
C	33	Mame Kane	6 ft 6 in (1.98 m)	So	The Academy of Central Florida	Dakar, Senegal

Head coach

- Octavia Blue (Miami (FL))

Assistant coach(es)

- Keisha McClinic (Middle Tennessee)
- Chris Straker (San Diego State)

Legend

- (C) Team captain
- (S) Suspended
- (I) Ineligible
- (W) Walk-on
- Injured
- Current redshirt

Roster
Last update: February 9, 2026

== Schedule and results ==
Date time, TV	Rank^{#}	Opponent^{#}	Result	Record	High points	High rebounds	High assists	Site (attendance) city, state
Non-conference regular season
November 4, 2025*; 7:00 pm, ESPN+		Shorter	W 85–36	1–0	20 – Nichols	6 – Taylor	7 – Flowers	VyStar Arena (883); Kennesaw, GA
November 8, 2025*; 7:00 pm, ESPN+		Florida Atlantic	L 68–69	1–1	25 – Berry	9 – Stovall	2 – Fields	VyStar Arena (567); Kennesaw, GA
November 12, 2025*; 2:00 pm, ESPN+		at East Tennessee State	W 64–63	2–1	20 – Williamson	12 – Taylor	4 – Fields	Brooks Gymnasium (234); Johnson City, TN
November 15, 2025*; 2:00 pm, ESPN+		Tennessee Tech	W 61–60	3–1	20 – Berry	9 – Taylor	5 – Flowers	VyStar Arena (515); Kennesaw, GA
November 15, 2025*; 6:00 pm, ESPN+		at South Alabama	L 54−66	3−2	19 – Berry	10 – Berry	6 – Fields	Mitchell Center (380); Mobile, AL
November 28, 2025*; 7:00 pm, ESPN+		USC Upstate	W 55−41	4−2	20 – Nichols	12 – Berry	2 – Berry	VyStar Arena (471); Kennesaw, GA
December 1, 2025*; 12:00 pm, SECN+		at Alabama	L 65–79	4–3	19 – Berry	8 – Berry	4 – Tied	Coleman Coliseum (2,467); Tuscaloosa, AL
December 6, 2025*; 12:00 pm, ESPN+		Thomas	W 81–37	5–3	15 – Bendeck-Giron	7 – Taylor	4 – Tied	VyStar Arena (405); Kennesaw, GA
December 14, 2025*; 2:00 pm, ESPN+		at Georgia State	W 69–63	6–3	19 – Nichols	9 – Taylor	5 – Bendeck-Giron	GSU Convocation Center (859); Atlanta, GA
December 21, 2025*; 12:00 pm, ACCNX		at Miami (FL)	L 55–85	6–4	12 – Tied	6 – Stovall	4 – Bendeck-Giron	Watsco Center (609); Coral Gables, FL
December 29, 2025*; 7:00 pm, ESPN+		Life	W 86–41	7–4	20 – Tied	12 – Stovall	5 – Tied	VyStar Arena (475); Kennesaw, GA
C-USA regular season
January 2, 2026; 7:00 pm, ESPN+		Middle Tennessee	L 47−60	7−5 (0–1)	15 – Taylor	7 – Stovall	5 – Fields	VyStar Arena (577); Kennesaw, GA
January 4, 2026; 2:00 pm, ESPN+		Western Kentucky	W 78–64	8–5 (1–1)	22 – Fields	11 – Williamson	6 – Tied	VyStar Arena (639); Kennesaw, GA
January 8, 2026; 7:30 pm, ESPN+		at Missouri State	L 61–67	8–6 (1–2)	12 – Tied	6 – Tied	5 – Fields	Great Southern Bank Arena (1,863); Springfield, MO
January 10, 2026; 1:00 pm, ESPN+		at FIU	L 65–76	8–7 (1–3)	27 – Berry	6 – Stovall	3 – Tied	Ocean Bank Convocation Center (111); Miami, FL
January 17, 2026; 2:00 pm, ESPN+		Jacksonville State	L 47–74	8–8 (1–4)	11 – Williamson	7 – Tied	5 – Fields	VyStar Arena (513); Kennesaw, GA
January 22, 2026; 7:00 pm, ESPN+		UTEP	W 83–52	9–8 (2–4)	18 – Tied	11 – Stovall	4 – Tied	VyStar Arena (441); Kennesaw, GA
January 24, 2026; 12:00 pm, ESPN+		New Mexico State	W 70–55	10–8 (3–4)	31 – Berry	15 – Taylor	9 – Fields	VyStar Arena (545); Kennesaw, GA
January 29, 2026; 7:30 pm, ESPN+		at Louisiana Tech	L 44–72	10–9 (3–5)	15 – Stovall	6 – Tied	2 – Tied	Thomas Assembly Center (1,496); Ruston, LA
January 31, 2026; 3:00 pm, ESPN+		at Sam Houston	L 57–62	10–10 (3–6)	20 – Williamson	6 – Berry	6 – Nichols	Bernard Johnson Coliseum (515); Huntsville, TX
February 5, 2026; 7:00 pm, ESPN+		Delaware	L 60–65 ^{OT}	10–11 (3–7)	19 – Tied	9 – Williamson	4 – Taylor	VyStar Arena (681); Kennesaw, GA
February 7, 2026; 2:00 pm, ESPN+		Liberty	W 64–58	11–11 (4–7)	18 – Nichols	9 – Taylor	9 – Fields	VyStar Arena (822); Kennesaw, GA
February 12, 2026; 12:00 pm, ESPN+		at Western Kentucky	W 55–51	12–11 (5–7)	17 – Berry	9 – Taylor	4 – Taylor	E. A. Diddle Arena (2,621); Bowling Green, KY
February 14, 2026; 5:00 pm, ESPN+		at Middle Tennessee	L 53–71	12–12 (5–8)	15 – Taylor	6 – Tied	5 – Fields	Murphy Center (3,812); Murfreesboro, TN
February 19, 2026; 7:00 pm, ESPN+		Sam Houston	L 66–72	12–13 (5–9)	23 – Berry	11 – Stovall	3 – Fields	VyStar Arena (508); Kennesaw, GA
February 21, 2026; 2:00 pm, ESPN+		Louisiana Tech	L 59–63	12–14 (5–10)	13 – Williamson	9 – Stovall	4 – Flowers	VyStar Arena (835); Kennesaw, GA
February 26, 2026; 8:00 pm, ESPN+		at New Mexico State	L 40–52	12–15 (5–11)	12 – Berry	9 – Williamson	2 – Nichols	Pan American Center (863); Las Cruces, NM
February 28, 2026; 4:00 pm, ESPN+		at UTEP	W 58–57	13–15 (6–11)	15 – Nichols	8 – Williamson	3 – Tied	Don Haskins Center (1,191); El Paso, TX
March 7, 2026; 3:00 pm, ESPN+		at Jacksonville State	L 62-70 ^{OT}	13-16 (6-12)	21 – Williamson	17 – Taylor	4 – Stovall	Pete Mathews Coliseum (980); Jacksonville, AL
C-USA tournament
March 10, 2026; 11:30 am, ESPN+	(9)	vs. (8) Delaware; First Round	L 47-66	13-17	17 – Stovall	11 – Williamson	4 – Taylor	Propst Arena; Huntsville, AL
*Non-conference game. ^{#}Rankings from AP Poll. (#) Tournament seedings in parentheses. All times are in Eastern.
