= 2025–26 FIU Panthers women's basketball team =

American college basketball season

2025–26 FIU Panthers women's basketball

WNIT, Super 16
- Conference: Conference USA
- Record: 21–12 (12–6 C-USA)
- Head coach: Jesyka Burks-Wiley (5th season)
- Assistant coaches: Christelle N'Garsanet; Dan Wendt; Heather Karner
- Home arena: Ocean Bank Convocation Center

2025–26 Conference USA women's basketball standings
	Conf.				Overall
Team	W		L	PCT	W		L	PCT
Louisiana Tech	17	–	1	.944	26	–	7	.788
FIU	12	–	6	.667	21	–	12	.636
Middle Tennessee	11	–	7	.611	17	–	16	.515
Sam Houston	11	–	7	.611	18	–	13	.581
Liberty	11	–	7	.611	18	–	13	.581
Missouri State †	11	–	7	.611	23	–	13	.639
Jacksonville State	9	–	9	.500	16	–	16	.500
Delaware	6	–	12	.333	13	–	19	.406
Kennesaw State	6	–	12	.333	13	–	17	.433
UTEP	5	–	13	.278	13	–	17	.433
New Mexico State	5	–	13	.278	9	–	21	.300
Western Kentucky	4	–	14	.222	8	–	21	.276
† 2026 CUSA tournament winner

The 2025–26 FIU Panthers women's basketball team represents Florida International University during the 2025–26 NCAA Division I women's basketball season. The Panthers, led by fifth-year head coach Jesyka Burks-Wiley, play their home games at the Ocean Bank Convocation Center in Miami, Florida as members of Conference USA.

== Previous season ==
The Panthers finished the 2024–25 season 11–19, 7–11 in C-USA play, to finish in a tie for sixth place. They were defeated by Western Kentucky in the quarterfinals of the C-USA tournament.

== Preseason ==
On October 9, 2025, Conference USA released their preseason poll. FIU was picked to finish sixth in the conference.

=== Preseason rankings ===
Conference USA Preseason Poll
Place	Team	Votes
1	Louisiana Tech	128 (5)
2	Liberty	125 (5)
3	Middle Tennessee	123 (2)
4	Missouri State	107
5	Western Kentucky	96
6	FIU	74
7	Sam Houston	59
T-8	UTEP	57
T-8	Kennesaw State	57
10	New Mexico State	51
11	Delaware	36
12	Jacksonville State	23
(#) first-place votes

=== Preseason All-CUSA Team ===
Preseason All-CUSA Team
Player	Position	Year
Parris Atkins	Guard	Senior

== Roster ==
2025–26 FIU Panthers women's basketball team
Players
Coaches

Pos.	#	Name	Height	Year	Previous school	Hometown
G	0	Denika Lightbourne	5 ft 9 in (1.75 m)	Jr	Dayton	Nassau, Bahamas
G	1	Judit Valero	5 ft 11 in (1.8 m)	Jr	South Florida	Sant Feliu de Llobregat, Spain
G	3	Riley Burd	6 ft 0 in (1.83 m)	Jr	Midland College	Perth, Australia
G	5	Grecia Ferrer Leal	5 ft 6 in (1.68 m)	Fr	Institut La Llauna	Badalona, Spain
G	10	Parris Atkins	5 ft 8 in (1.73 m)	Sr	Dodge City Community College	Little Rock, Arkansas
F	12	Astou Ndiaye	6 ft 1 in (1.85 m)	Fr	The Academy of Central Florida	Keur Moussa, Senegal
F	13	Astrid Mukulumpe	6 ft 4 in (1.93 m)	So	Mercer	Orléans, France
G	14	Ndate Ndiaye	5 ft 10 in (1.78 m)	So	Greenforest Christian Academy	Thiès, Senegal
G	15	Fantasia James	5 ft 9 in (1.75 m)	RS So	Oakleaf High School	Orange Park, Florida
G	21	Adama Badjie Coly	5 ft 8 in (1.73 m)	Jr	Casper College	Mataró, Spain
G	23	Rhema Collins	6 ft 2 in (1.88 m)	Jr	Ole Miss	Nassau, Bahamas
F	24	Selene Romero	6 ft 5 in (1.96 m)	So	Bethesda	Guanajuato, Mexico
G	30	Isamery Telleria	5 ft 9 in (1.75 m)	GS	Jacksonville	San Francisco de Macorís, Dominican Republic
F	44	Claudia Marina	5 ft 11 in (1.8 m)	So	IES Alfredo Kraus	Madrid, Spain

Head coach

- Jesyka Burks-Wiley (Boston University)

Assistant coach(es)

- Christelle N'Garsanet (Missouri)
- Dan Wendt (West Valley)
- Heather Karner (Youngstown State)

Legend

- (C) Team captain
- (S) Suspended
- (I) Ineligible
- (W) Walk-on
- Injured
- Current redshirt

Roster
Last update: February 7, 2026

== Schedule and results ==
Date time, TV	Rank^{#}	Opponent^{#}	Result	Record	High points	High rebounds	High assists	Site (attendance) city, state
Non-conference regular season
November 3, 2025*; 6:00 pm, ESPN+		at South Florida	L 56–81	0–1	21 – Lightbourne	8 – Lightbourne	5 – Ferrer Leal	Yuengling Center; Tampa, FL
November 15, 2025*; 12:00 pm, ESPN+		Bethune–Cookman	W 81–68	1–1	17 – Collins	10 – Collins	7 – Ferrer Leal	Ocean Bank Convocation Center (281); Miami, FL
November 18, 2025*; 11:00 am, ESPN+		at UCF	L 61–79	1–2	20 – Atkins	7 – Collins	4 – Ferrer Leal	Addition Financial Arena (1,357); Orlando, FL
November 22, 2025*; 2:00 pm, ESPN+		at Jacksonville	L 69–80	1–3	19 – Collins	10 – Collins	5 – Ferrer Leal	Swisher Gymnasium (128); Jacksonville, FL
November 28, 2025*; 11:00 am, ESPN+		UMBC; FIU Thanksgiving Classic	W 86−76	2−3	19 – Tied	10 – Collins	6 – Atkins	Ocean Bank Convocation Center (52); Miami, FL
November 30, 2025*; 1:30 pm, ESPN+		Seattle; FIU Thanksgiving Classic	W 64−59	3−3	20 – Atkins	9 – Collins	7 – Ferrer Leal	Ocean Bank Convocation Center (58); Miami, FL
December 5, 2025*; 7:00 pm, ESPN+		Georgia State	W 103–92	4–3	40 – Collins	13 – Collins	5 – Lightbourne	Ocean Bank Convocation Center (146); Miami, FL
December 15, 2025*; 7:00 pm, ESPN+		at Florida Atlantic	W 80–63	5–3	20 – Atkins	16 – Collins	4 – Ferrer Leal	Eleanor R. Baldwin Arena (912); Boca Raton, FL
December 19, 2025*; 11:00 am, ESPN+		Youngstown State; FIU Holiday Classic	W 78–61	6–3	28 – Collins	12 – Collins	5 – Ferrer Leal	Ocean Bank Convocation Center (126); Miami, FL
December 20, 2025*; 11:00 am, ESPN+		Florida Atlantic; FIU Holiday Classic	L 57–60	6–4	21 – Atkins	7 – Collins	3 – Collins	Ocean Bank Convocation Center (128); Miami, FL
December 30, 2025*; 1:00 pm, ESPN+		Florida National	W 122–30	7–4	18 – Atkins	10 – Badjie Coly	6 – Lightbourne	Ocean Bank Convocation Center (49); Miami, FL
C-USA regular season
January 4, 2026; 1:00 pm, ESPN+		Missouri State	L 69−80	7−5 (0–1)	35 – Atkins	4 – Tied	5 – Atkins	Ocean Bank Convocation Center (85); Miami, FL
January 8, 2026; 7:00 pm, ESPN+		Jacksonville State	L 67–70	7–6 (0–2)	25 – Lightbourne	11 – Collins	4 – Ferrer Leal	Ocean Bank Convocation Center (127); Miami, FL
January 10, 2026; 1:00 pm, ESPN+		Kennesaw State	W 76–65	8–6 (1–2)	23 – Atkins	8 – Collins	4 – Ferrer Leal	Ocean Bank Convocation Center (111); Miami, FL
January 15, 2026; 8:00 pm, ESPN+		at New Mexico State	W 83–74	9–6 (2–2)	29 – Collins	10 – Collins	5 – Ferrer Leal	Pan American Center (825); Las Cruces, NM
January 17, 2026; 2:00 pm, ESPN+		at UTEP	W 67–59	10–6 (3–2)	22 – Collins	16 – Collins	3 – Lightbourne	Don Haskins Center (881); El Paso, TX
January 22, 2026; 7:00 pm, ESPN+		Sam Houston	W 66–60	11–6 (4–2)	14 – Atkins	7 – Lightbourne	5 – Lightbourne	Ocean Bank Convocation Center (127); Miami, FL
January 24, 2026; 1:00 pm, ESPN+		Louisiana Tech	L 59–74	11–7 (4–3)	14 – Atkins	6 – Tied	4 – Tied	Ocean Bank Convocation Center (188); Miami, FL
January 30, 2026; 7:00 pm, ESPN+		at Liberty	W 74–61	12–7 (5–3)	19 – Collins	11 – Collins	5 – Atkins	Liberty Arena (928); Lynchburg, VA
February 1, 2026; 4:00 pm, ESPN+		at Delaware	L 48–51	12–8 (5–4)	20 – Collins	13 – Badjie Coly	4 – Ferrer Leal	Bob Carpenter Center (1,156); Newark, DE
February 5, 2026; 7:00 pm, ESPN+		Western Kentucky	W 80–54	13–8 (6–4)	18 – Atkins	13 – Collins	7 – Ferrer Leal	Ocean Bank Convocation Center (155); Miami, FL
February 7, 2026; 1:00 pm, ESPN+		Middle Tennessee	W 60–58	14–8 (7–4)	15 – Tied	8 – Ferrer Leal	5 – Ferrer Leal	Ocean Bank Convocation Center (157); Miami, FL
February 12, 2026; 7:30 pm, ESPN+		at Louisiana Tech	L 49–71	14–9 (7–5)	11 – Valero	12 – James	2 – Ferrer Leal	Thomas Assembly Center (1,568); Ruston, LA
February 14, 2026; 2:00 pm, ESPN+		at Sam Houston	W 67–65	15–9 (8–5)	24 – Collins	7 – Badjie Coly	9 – Atkins	Bernard Johnson Coliseum (365); Huntsville, TX
February 19, 2026; 11:00 am, ESPN+		Delaware	W 62–36	16–9 (9–5)	20 – Collins	10 – Atkins	6 – Ferrer Leal	Ocean Bank Convocation Center (1,062); Miami, FL
February 21, 2026; 12:00 pm, ESPN+		Liberty	W 66–45	17–9 (10–5)	25 – Atkins	10 – Collins	5 – Atkins	Ocean Bank Convocation Center (214); Miami, FL
February 26, 2026; 7:30 pm, ESPN+		at Missouri State	L 38–69	17–10 (10–6)	13 – Atkins	6 – Tied	1 – Tied	Great Southern Bank Arena (2,074); Springfield, MO
March 5, 2026; 7:30 pm, ESPN+		at Middle Tennessee	W 80-78	18-10 (11-6)	22 – Collins	8 – Badjie Coly	3 – Tied	Murphy Center (3,434); Murfreesboro, TN
March 7, 2026; 2:00 pm, ESPN+		at Western Kentucky	W 64-60	19-10 (12-6)	22 – Atkins	12 – Collins	2 – Tied	E. A. Diddle Arena (1,010); Bowling Green, KY
C-USA tournament
March 11, 2026; 3:00 pm, ESPN+	(2)	vs. (7) Jacksonville State; Quarterfinals	W 76-66	20-10	23 – Atkins	8 – Collins	4 – Tied	Propst Arena (1,905); Huntsville, AL
March 13, 2026; 9:00 pm, ESPN+	(2)	vs. (6) Missouri State; Semifinals	L 69-74	20-11	26 – Collins	7 – Tied	5 – Atkins	Von Braun Center (2,187); Huntsville, AL
March 13, 2026; 9:00 pm, ESPN+	(2)	vs. (6) Missouri State; Semifinals	L 69-74	20-11	26 – Collins	7 – Tied	5 – Atkins	Von Braun Center (2,187); Huntsville, AL
WNIT
March 20, 2026; 7:00 pm, ESPN+		vs. Stetson; First Round	W 76-73	21-11	24 – Collins	10 – Collins	3 – Tied	Ocean Bank Convocation Center (338); Miami, FL
March 24, 2026; 7:00 pm, ESPN+		vs. Abilene Christian; First Round	L 66-77	21-12	25 – Collins	9 – Collins	6 – Ferrer Leal	Moody Coliseum (376); Abilene, TX
*Non-conference game. ^{#}Rankings from AP Poll. (#) Tournament seedings in parentheses. All times are in Eastern.
