= 2025–26 Jacksonville State Gamecocks women's basketball team =

American college basketball season

2025–26 Jacksonville State Gamecocks women's basketball
- Conference: Conference USA
- Record: 16–16 (9–9 C-USA)
- Head coach: Rick Pietri (13th season)
- Assistant coaches: Eric Wise; Rachel Barnes; Harley Cook; Toni West
- Home arena: Pete Mathews Coliseum

2025–26 Conference USA women's basketball standings
	Conf.				Overall
Team	W		L	PCT	W		L	PCT
Louisiana Tech	17	–	1	.944	26	–	7	.788
FIU	12	–	6	.667	21	–	12	.636
Middle Tennessee	11	–	7	.611	17	–	16	.515
Sam Houston	11	–	7	.611	18	–	13	.581
Liberty	11	–	7	.611	18	–	13	.581
Missouri State †	11	–	7	.611	23	–	13	.639
Jacksonville State	9	–	9	.500	16	–	16	.500
Delaware	6	–	12	.333	13	–	19	.406
Kennesaw State	6	–	12	.333	13	–	17	.433
UTEP	5	–	13	.278	13	–	17	.433
New Mexico State	5	–	13	.278	9	–	21	.300
Western Kentucky	4	–	14	.222	8	–	21	.276
† 2026 CUSA tournament winner

The 2025–26 Jacksonville State Gamecocks women's basketball team represents Jacksonville State University during the 2025–26 NCAA Division I women's basketball season. The Gamecocks, led by 13th-year head coach Rick Pietri, play their home games at the Pete Mathews Coliseum in Jacksonville, Alabama, as third-year members of Conference USA.

== Previous season ==
The Gamecocks finished the 2024–25 season 10–20, 4–14 in C-USA play, to finish in a tie for ninth (last) place. They were defeated by Sam Houston in the first round of the C-USA tournament.

== Preseason ==
On October 9, 2025, Conference USA released their preseason poll. Jacksonville State was picked to finish 12th (last) in the conference.

=== Preseason rankings ===
Conference USA Preseason Poll
Place	Team	Votes
1	Louisiana Tech	128 (5)
2	Liberty	125 (5)
3	Middle Tennessee	123 (2)
4	Missouri State	107
5	Western Kentucky	96
6	FIU	74
7	Sam Houston	59
T-8	UTEP	57
T-8	Kennesaw State	57
10	New Mexico State	51
11	Delaware	36
12	Jacksonville State	23
(#) first-place votes

=== Preseason All-CUSA Team ===
Preseason All-CUSA Team
Player	Position	Year
Mya Barnes	Forward	Ffith Year

== Roster ==
2025–26 Jacksonville State Gamecocks women's basketball team
Players
Coaches

Pos.	#	Name	Height	Year	Previous school	Hometown
G	1	Eden Sample	5 ft 10 in (1.78 m)	RS Sr	Old Dominion	Suwanee, Georgia
G	4	Maša Buzic	5 ft 11 in (1.8 m)	So	Chattanooga	Belgrade, Serbia
G	5	Mearah Whitehead	5 ft 8 in (1.73 m)	Fr	Archer High School	Lawrenceville, Georgia
F/C	11	Vitória Carvalho (5th)	6 ft 3 in (1.91 m)	Sr	Idaho	Rio de Janeiro, Brazil
G	13	Abril Ricart-Mensah	5 ft 9 in (1.75 m)	Fr	Institut Cirvianum de Torelló	Sant Pere de Torelló, Spain
F	14	Mina Djurdjevic	6 ft 1 in (1.85 m)	Fr	Central Pointe Christian Academy	Belgrade, Serbia
G	15	Makala Hobdy	5 ft 6 in (1.68 m)	Jr	Shelton State Community College	Troy, Alabama
G	21	Kyera Thornsbury	5 ft 7 in (1.7 m)	So	Pikeville High School	Belfry, Kentucky
F	22	Mya Barnes (5th)	6 ft 0 in (1.83 m)	Sr	Shelton State Community College	Montgomery, Alabama
G	23	Adriana Jones	5 ft 6 in (1.68 m)	Sr	Troy	Newbern, Alabama
F	32	Brooklyn McDaniel	5 ft 11 in (1.8 m)	Sr	Cleburne County High School	Heflin, Alabama
F	71	María Sánchez-Ponce	5 ft 10 in (1.78 m)	Sr	Reinhardt	Conil de la Frontera, Spain

Head coach

- Rick Pietri (South Alabama)

Assistant coach(es)

- Eric Wise (Louisiana)
- Rachel Barnes (Providence)
- Harley Cook (Jacksonville State)
- Toni West (Shelton State)

Legend

- (C) Team captain
- (S) Suspended
- (I) Ineligible
- (W) Walk-on
- (5th) Fifth-year senior
- Injured
- Current redshirt

Roster
Last update: February 8, 2026

== Schedule and results ==
Date time, TV	Rank^{#}	Opponent^{#}	Result	Record	High points	High rebounds	High assists	Site (attendance) city, state
Non-conference regular season
November 3, 2025*; 11:30 am, ESPN+		LaGrange	W 92–35	1–0	16 – Sánchez-Ponce	7 – Tied	8 – Thornsbury	Pete Mathews Coliseum (1,567); Jacksonville, AL
November 10, 2025*; 6:00 pm, ESPN+		at North Alabama	L 54–66	1–1	16 – Hobdy	8 – Hobdy	2 – Jones	CB&S Bank Arena (1,170); Florence, AL
November 13, 2025*; 6:30 pm, ESPN+		Southern Miss	L 61–67	1–2	26 – Jones	10 – Carvalho	5 – Hobdy	Pete Mathews Coliseum (1,167); Jacksonville, AL
November 16, 2025*; 1:00 pm, SECN+		at Georgia	L 51–76	1–3	14 – Sánchez-Ponce	6 – Hobdy	2 – Thornsbury	Stegeman Coliseum (2,154); Athens, GA
November 22, 2025*; 2:00 pm, ESPN+		at New Orleans	W 65–62	2–3	22 – Barnes	13 – Carvalho	7 – Thornsbury	Lakefront Arena (567); New Orleans, LA
November 28, 2025*; 3:00 pm, ESPN+		vs. UC Davis; Tiger Turkey Tip-Off	L 59−69	2−4	17 – Djurdjevic	6 – Djurdjevic	2 – Tied	Alex G. Spanos Center (392); Stockton, CA
November 29, 2025*; 5:30 pm, ESPN+		at Pacific; Tiger Turkey Tip-Off	L 63−70	2−5	15 – Jones	7 – Tied	4 – Tied	Alex G. Spanos Center (436); Stockton, CA
December 6, 2025*; 2:30 pm, ESPN+		Mercer	W 72–62	3–5	18 – Thornsbury	13 – Barnes	3 – Tied	Pete Mathews Coliseum (467); Jacksonville, AL
December 9, 2025*; 6:30 pm, ESPN+		Brewton–Parker	W 60–35	4–5	14 – Hobdy	10 – Tied	2 – Tied	Pete Mathews Coliseum (467); Jacksonville, AL
December 13, 2025*; 2:30 pm, ESPN+		Point	W 90–30	5–5	18 – Thornsbury	9 – Tied	6 – Hobdy	Pete Mathews Coliseum (287); Jacksonville, AL
December 17, 2025*; 4:00 pm, ESPN+		at Saint Louis	L 54–74	5–6	18 – Barnes	8 – Tied	4 – Barnes	Chaifetz Arena (171); St. Louis, MO
December 21, 2025*; 1:00 pm, ESPN+		at Presbyterian	W 74–39	6–6	15 – Hobdy	12 – Barnes	4 – Thornsbury	Templeton Center (194); Clinton, SC
C-USA regular season
January 2, 2026; 6:30 pm, ESPN+		Western Kentucky	W 75−48	7−6 (1–0)	19 – Tied	9 – Barnes	3 – Tied	Pete Mathews Coliseum (347); Jacksonville, AL
January 4, 2026; 2:30 pm, ESPN+		Middle Tennessee	L 52–69	7–7 (1–1)	14 – McDaniel	8 – Tied	2 – Tied	Pete Mathews Coliseum (753); Jacksonville, AL
January 8, 2026; 6:00 pm, ESPN+		at FIU	W 70–67	8–7 (2–1)	16 – McDaniel	13 – Barnes	3 – Tied	Ocean Bank Convocation Center (127); Miami, FL
January 10, 2026; 12:00 pm, ESPN+		at Missouri State	L 47–63	8–8 (2–2)	16 – McDaniel	8 – Tied	2 – Hobdy	Great Southern Bank Arena (2,190); Springfield, MO
January 17, 2026; 1:00 pm, ESPN+		at Kennesaw State	W 74–47	9–8 (3–2)	18 – Barnes	10 – Barnes	3 – Tied	VyStar Arena (513); Kennesaw, GA
January 22, 2026; 6:30 pm, ESPN+		New Mexico State	W 57–46	10–8 (4–2)	20 – Jones	13 – Barnes	3 – Hobdy	Pete Mathews Coliseum (464); Jacksonville, AL
January 24, 2026; 12:00 pm, ESPN+		UTEP	W 73–60	11–8 (5–2)	13 – Tied	7 – Tied	6 – Hobdy	Pete Mathews Coliseum (471); Jacksonville, AL
January 29, 2026; 6:30 pm, ESPN+		at Sam Houston	L 51–70	11–9 (5–3)	13 – Tied	11 – Djurdjevic	2 – Thornsbury	Bernard Johnson Coliseum (555); Huntsville, TX
January 31, 2026; 2:00 pm, ESPN+		at Louisiana Tech	L 51–71	11–10 (5–4)	17 – Sánchez-Ponce	9 – Barnes	2 – Tied	Thomas Assembly Center (1,736); Ruston, LA
February 5, 2026; 6:30 pm, ESPN+		Liberty	L 55–60	11–11 (5–5)	10 – Jones	11 – Barnes	3 – Tied	Pete Mathews Coliseum (573); Jacksonville, AL
February 7, 2026; 1:30 pm, ESPN+		Delaware	W 61–58	12–11 (6–5)	20 – Barnes	6 – Barnes	3 – Tied	Pete Mathews Coliseum (1,084); Jacksonville, AL
February 12, 2026; 6:30 pm, ESPN+		at Middle Tennessee	L 48–57	12–12 (6–6)	11 – Djurdjevic	5 – Tied	3 – Thornsbury	Murphy Center (3,572); Murfreesboro, TN
February 14, 2026; 2:00 pm, ESPN+		at Western Kentucky	L 41–56	12–13 (6–7)	10 – Jones	9 – Jones	2 – Tied	E. A. Diddle Arena (723); Bowling Green, KY
February 19, 2026; 6:30 pm, ESPN+		Louisiana Tech	L 57–58	12–14 (6–8)	13 – Tied	10 – Barnes	4 – Hobdy	Pete Mathews Coliseum (597); Jacksonville, AL
February 21, 2026; 2:30 pm, ESPN+		Sam Houston	W 69–68	13–14 (7–8)	21 – McDaniel	13 – McDaniel	2 – Tied	Pete Mathews Coliseum (699); Jacksonville, AL
February 26, 2026; 8:00 pm, ESPN+		at UTEP	L 64–66	13–15 (7–9)	20 – Barnes	15 – Barnes	4 – Thornsbury	Don Haskins Center (1,150); El Paso, TX
February 28, 2026; 3:00 pm, ESPN+		at New Mexico State	W 57–38	14–15 (8–9)	13 – Barnes	6 – Tied	3 – Thornsbury	Pan American Center (904); Las Cruces, NM
March 7, 2026; 2:00 pm, ESPN+		Kennesaw State	W 70-62	15-15 (9-9)	26 – Thornsbury	9 – McDaniel	3 – Tied	Pete Mathews Coliseum (980); Jacksonville, AL
C-USA tournament
March 10, 2026; 2:00 pm, ESPN+	(7)	vs. (10) UTEP; First Round	W 82-77 ^{2 OT}	16-15	17 – Tied	10 – McDaniel	4 – Jones	Propst Arena; Huntsville, AL
March 11, 2026; 2:00 pm, ESPN+	(7)	vs. (2) FIU; Quarterfinal	L 66-76	16-16	20 – Sanchez-Ponce	7 – Tied	3 – Thornsbury	Von Braun Center (1,905); Huntsville, AL
*Non-conference game. ^{#}Rankings from AP Poll. (#) Tournament seedings in parentheses. All times are in Central.
