= 2026 Conference USA women's basketball tournament =

American college basketball tournament

- Classification: Division I
- Season: 2025–26
- Teams: 12
- Site: Propst Arena; Huntsville, Alabama
- Champions: Missouri State (1st title)
- Winning coach: Beth Cunningham (1st title)
- Television: ESPN+ & CBSSN championship only

2025–26 Conference USA women's basketball standings
	Conf.				Overall
Team	W		L	PCT	W		L	PCT
Louisiana Tech	17	–	1	.944	26	–	7	.788
FIU	12	–	6	.667	21	–	12	.636
Middle Tennessee	11	–	7	.611	17	–	15	.531
Sam Houston	11	–	7	.611	18	–	13	.581
Liberty	11	–	7	.611	18	–	13	.581
Missouri State †	11	–	7	.611	23	–	13	.639
Jacksonville State	9	–	9	.500	16	–	16	.500
Delaware	6	–	12	.333	13	–	19	.406
Kennesaw State	6	–	12	.333	13	–	17	.433
UTEP	5	–	13	.278	13	–	17	.433
New Mexico State	5	–	13	.278	9	–	21	.300
Western Kentucky	4	–	14	.222	8	–	21	.276
† 2026 CUSA tournament winner

The 2026 Conference USA women's basketball tournament was a postseason women's basketball tournament that was completed in the 2025–26 season in the Conference USA. The tournament was held at the Von Braun Center in Huntsville, Alabama, from March 10–14, 2025. The tournament winner received an automatic bid to the NCAA tournament.

== Seeds ==
The top ten of the conference's 12 teams had the chance compete in the tournament. While the top six teams all received byes straight into the quarterfinals. Teams will be seeded by record within the conference based on games played against each other, with a tiebreaker system to seed teams with identical conference records.

Seed	School	Conference record	Tiebreaker
1	Louisiana Tech	17–1	
2	FIU	12–6	
3	Middle Tennessee	11–7	
4	Sam Houston	11–7	
5	Liberty	11–7	
6	Missouri State	11–7	
7	Jacksonville State	9–9	
8	Delaware	6–12	1–0 vs. Kennesaw State
9	Kennesaw State	6–12	0–1 vs. Delaware
10	UTEP	5–13	2–0 vs. New Mexico State
DNQ	New Mexico State	5–13	0–2 vs. UTEP
DNQ	Western Kentucky	4–14	

== Schedule ==
Game	Time	Matchup	Score	Television	Attendance
First round – March 10, 2026
1	11:30 am	No. 8 Delaware vs. No. 9 Kennesaw State	66–47	ESPN+	
2	2:00 pm	No. 7 Jacksonville State vs. No. 10 UTEP	82–77^{2OT}	ESPN+	
Quarterfinals – March 11, 2026
3	11:30 am	No. 1 Louisiana Tech vs. No. 8 Delaware	72–43	ESPN+	1,905
4	2:00 pm	No. 2 FIU vs. No. 7 Jacksonville State	76–66	ESPN+	1,905
Quarterfinals – March 12, 2026
5	11:30 am	No. 4 Sam Houston vs. No. 5 Liberty	57–89	ESPN+	2,346
6	2:00 pm	No. 3 Middle Tennessee vs. No. 6 Missouri State	66–69	ESPN+	3,528
Semifinals – March 13, 2026
7	5:30 pm	No. 1 Louisiana Tech vs. No. 5 Liberty	61–48	ESPN+	2,035
8	8:00 pm	No. 2 FIU vs. No. 6 Missouri State	69–74	ESPN+	2,187
Championship – March 14, 2026
9	4:30 pm	No. 1 Louisiana Tech vs. No. 6 Missouri State	38–43	CBSSN	2,623
*Game times in CDT. ()-Rankings denote tournament seeding.

== Bracket ==
First round Tuesday, March 10
8	Delaware	66
9	Kennesaw State	47
7	Jacksonville State	82**
10	UTEP	77

Quarterfinals; Wednesday, March 11; Thursday, March 12
1	Louisiana Tech	72
8	Delaware	43
4	Sam Houston	57
5	Liberty	89
2	FIU	76
7	Jacksonville State	66
3	Middle Tennessee	66
6	Missouri State	69

Semifinals; Friday, March 13
1	Louisiana Tech	61
5	Liberty	48
2	FIU	69
6	Missouri State	74

Championship; Saturday, March 14
1	Louisiana Tech	38
6	Missouri State	43

* – Denotes overtime period

== See also ==
- 2026 Conference USA men's basketball tournament
