= Beth Cunningham (basketball) =

American basketball player and coach (born 1975)

Missouri State Lady Bears
- Title: Head coach
- League: Conference USA

Personal information
- Born: June 5, 1975 (age 51) Greenville, Ohio, U.S.
- Listed height: 6 ft 0 in (1.83 m)
- Listed weight: 150 lb (68 kg)

Career information
- High school: Bloomington South (Bloomington, Indiana)
- College: Notre Dame (1993–1997)
- Position: Shooting guard
- Number: 21
- Coaching career: 2001–present

Career history

Playing
- 1997–1998: Philadelphia Rage
- 2000: Washington Mystics

Coaching
- 2001–2003: VCU (assistant/assoc. HC)
- 2003–2012: VCU
- 2012–2020: Notre Dame (associate)
- 2020–2022: Duke (assistant)
- 2022–present: Missouri State

Career highlights
- As player: 2x First-team All-Big East (1996, 1997); As coach: MVC regular season champion (2025); CUSA tournament (2026); MVC Coach of the Year (2025)
- Stats at Basketball Reference
Medals
Women's basketball
Representing the United States
World University Games
Gold medal – first place	1997 Marsala	Team competition
Pan American Games
Bronze medal – third place	1999 Winnipeg	Team

Beth Cunningham (née Morgan; born June 5, 1975), is the head coach of the Missouri State women's basketball team.

== Career ==
She was previously an associate head coach at Duke and Notre Dame and had been the women's basketball head coach at Virginia Commonwealth University and a former women's basketball player.

As Beth Morgan, she played for the University of Notre Dame, the Richmond Rage/Philadelphia Rage of the American Basketball League and the Washington Mystics of the WNBA before turning to coaching. She finished her playing career as one of the most decorated and top women's basketball players of all time.

She also played on the American teams in 1997 Summer Universiade and the 1999 Pan American Games.

Cunningham ranked as number 1 on Notre Dame's all-time scoring list with 2,322 points, until surpassed by Skylar Diggins. Diggins had played 17 more games than Cunningham did at Notre Dame. During her career, Cunningham set or tied 28 school records. In her final two seasons, she was a first team all-Big-East selection.

Cunningham took over the VCU Rams for the 2003–04 season after serving as assistant coach of the team for two years. During her playing days at Notre Dame (1993–97), Cunningham was a trailblazer, leading the program to its first NCAA Women's Final Four appearance and a 31–7 campaign in her senior season. She was a two-time Associated Press and WBCA honorable mention All-America choice, four-time first-team all-conference selection and two-year team captain. The Irish were 97–32 in her four seasons, including a pair of conference titles and three NCAA appearances. She departed as the all-time leading scorer in Fighting Irish women's basketball history with 2,322 points (which now ranks third), having set or tied 28 school records during her career.

She was also a fixture in USA Basketball circles as both a player and coach, first suiting up for Team USA four times from 1996 to 1999 (winning three medals including a gold at the 1997 USA World University Games) and later serving as the athlete representative on the USA Basketball Women's Junior National Team Committee and the USA Basketball Women's Collegiate Committee.

Following her amateur career, Cunningham spent three seasons playing professional basketball, including two years with the Richmond/Philadelphia Rage of the American Basketball League (ABL) and one year with the WNBA's Washington Mystics in 2000 before embarking on her coaching career.

Her father, Bob Morgan, was the head baseball coach at Indiana University for 22 years before retiring in 2005.

== Personal life ==
She married Dan Cunningham in 1998. Originally from Bloomington, Indiana, Cunningham was a standout two-sport performer at Bloomington South High School, earning all-state honors in both basketball and tennis. She was inducted into the Monroe County Sports Hall of Fame in June 2011. She graduated from Notre Dame in 1997 with a bachelor's degree in Marketing from the top-ranked Mendoza College of Business before going on to earn her master's degree in Sports Leadership from VCU in 2003.

Cunningham and her husband, Dan, have four children.

== Career statistics ==
Legend
GP	Games played	GS	Games started	MPG	Minutes per game	RPG	Rebounds per game
APG	Assists per game	SPG	Steals per game	BPG	Blocks per game	PPG	Points per game
TO	Turnovers per game	FG%	Field-goal percentage	3P%	3-point field-goal percentage	FT%	Free-throw percentage
**Bold**	Career best	°	League leader

=== WNBA ===
==== Regular season ====
Year	Team	GP	GS	MPG	FG%	3P%	FT%	RPG	APG	SPG	BPG	TO	PPG
2000	Washington	21	0	9.4	25.0	24.3	84.2	1.0	0.6	0.1	0.0	0.6	2.8
Career	1 year, 1 team	21	0	9.4	25.0	24.3	84.2	1.0	0.6	0.1	0.0	0.6	2.8

==== Playoffs ====
Year	Team	GP	GS	MPG	FG%	3P%	FT%	RPG	APG	SPG	BPG	TO	PPG
2000	Washington	2	0	6.5	50.0	25.0	0.0	0.0	0.0	0.5	0.0	0.5	3.5
Career	1 year, 1 team	2	0	6.5	50.0	25.0	0.0	0.0	0.0	0.5	0.0	0.5	3.5

=== College ===
Legend
GP	Games played	GS	Games started	MPG	Minutes per game
FG%	Field goal percentage	3P%	3-point field goal percentage	FT%	Free throw percentage
RPG	Rebounds per game	APG	Assists per game	SPG	Steals per game
BPG	Blocks per game	PPG	Points per game	**Bold**	Career high

Year	Team	GP	Points	FG%	3P%	FT%	RPG	APG	SPG	BPG	PPG
1993–94	Notre Dame	29	518	**46.8%**	37.1%	78.6%	4.3	2.2	1.1	0.2	17.9
1994–95	Notre Dame	27	482	44.9%	38.1%	80.2%	4.1	1.6	1.4	**0.2**	17.9
1995–96	Notre Dame	31	626	46.1%	**39.9%**	**85.4%**	5.0	**2.6**	**2.1**	0.2	**20.2**
1996–97	Notre Dame	**38**	**696**	40.9%	32.6%	80.9%	**6.1**	2.6	1.7	0.1	18.3
Career		125	2322	44.4%	36.8%	81.4%	5.0	2.3	1.6	0.2	18.6

== Head coaching record ==
Record table
Season	Team	Overall	Conference	Standing	Postseason
VCU (Colonial Athletic Association) (2003–2012)
2003–04	VCU	14–14	10–8	T-4th	
2004–05	VCU	11–18	6–12	7th	
2005–06	VCU	13–15	6–12	9th	
2006–07	VCU	17–13	9–9	6th	
2007–08	VCU	26–8	13–5	T-3rd	WNIT 2nd Round
2008–09	VCU	26–7	15–3	2nd	NCAA 1st Round
2009–10	VCU	22–13	12–6	3rd	WNIT 1st Round
2010–11	VCU	19–12	13–5	4th	WNIT 1st Round
2011–12	VCU	19–15	9–9	6th	WNIT 3rd Round
VCU:		167–115 (.592)	93–69 (.574)		
Missouri State (Missouri Valley Conference) (2022–2025)
2022–23	Missouri State	20–12	14–6	T–4th	WNIT First Round
2023–24	Missouri State	23–10	15–5	3rd	WBIT First Round
2024–25	Missouri State	26–9	16–4	T–1st	WBIT Second Round
Missouri State (Conference USA) (2025–present)
2025–26	Missouri State	23–13	11–7	T–3rd	NCAA First Round
Missouri State:		92–44 (.676)	56–23 (.709)		
Total:		259–159 (.620)			
National champion Postseason invitational champion Conference regular season champion Conference regular season and conference tournament champion Division regular season champion Division regular season and conference tournament champion Conference tournament champion
