= 2026–27 Western Kentucky Lady Toppers basketball team =

American college basketball season

2026–27 Western Kentucky Lady Toppers basketball
- Conference: Conference USA
- Record: 3–1 (0–0 C-USA)
- Head coach: Greg Collins (9th season)
- Assistant coaches: Jon Plefka; Whitney Creech; C'eira Ricketts; David Walls
- Home arena: E. A. Diddle Arena

2026–27 Conference USA women's basketball standings
	Conf.				Overall
Team	W		L	PCT	W		L	PCT
Missouri State	0	–	0	–	4	–	1	.800
Western Kentucky	0	–	0	–	3	–	1	.750
Kennesaw State	0	–	0	–	3	–	2	.600
Liberty	0	–	0	–	3	–	2	.600
New Mexico State	0	–	0	–	3	–	2	.600
Sam Houston	0	–	0	–	3	–	2	.600
Jacksonville State	0	–	0	–	2	–	2	.500
Middle Tennessee	0	–	0	–	2	–	2	.500
FIU	0	–	0	–	1	–	3	.250
Delaware	0	–	0	–	1	–	4	.200
† 2027 CUSA tournament winner As of November 21, 2026

The 2026–27 Western Kentucky Lady Toppers basketball team currently represents Western Kentucky University during the 2026–27 NCAA Division I women's basketball season. The Lady Toppers, led by ninth-year head coach Greg Collins, play their home games at E. A. Diddle Arena in Bowling Green, Kentucky, and compete as a member of Conference USA.

== Previous season ==
The Lady Toppers finished the 2025–26 season 8–21 and 4–14 in C-USA play to finish last in the conference. They failed to qualify for the CUSA tournament. Their winning percentage of .276 was the worst in program history, beating out the 2011–12 team that had a record of 9–21 and a winning percentage of .300.

== Offseason ==
=== Departures ===
Western Kentucky departures
Name	Num	Pos.	Height	Year	Hometown	Reason for departure
Tia Shelling	3	Guard	5'8"	Senior	New Orleans, LA	Graduated
Caleigh Rose-West	4	Forward	6'0"	5th Year	Orlando, FL	Exhausted eligibility
Mya Prachter	5	Forward	6'0"	Senior	Memphis, TN	Graduated
Tobi Ademuwagun	12	Forward	5'10"	(redshirt) Sophomore	Katy, TX	Transferred to Texas Southern
Jeniffer Silva	22	Forward	6'4"	Senior	Recife, Brazil	Graduated
Zsofia Telegdy	23	Forward	6'2"	Senior	Budapest, Hungary	Graduated
Yendri Acosta	24	Guard	5'6"	Senior	Santo Domingo, Dominican Republic	Graduated
Salma Khedr	34	Guard	6'1"	Sophomore	Giza, Egypt	Transferred to UIC

=== Incoming transfers ===
Western Kentucky incoming transfers
Name	Num	Pos.	Height	Year	Hometown	Previous school
Kamille Brown	7	Guard	5'8"	Senior	Conway, AR	Louisiana–Monroe
Ellery Minch	12	Forward	6'3"	Junior	Fortville, IN	Murray State
Hayven Smith	14	Center	6'6"	Junior	Frankfort, IL	Illinois

=== Recruiting class ===
There was no recruiting class for the class of 2026.

== Preseason ==
On October 8, 2026, Conference USA released its annual preseason coaches poll and awards. Western Kentucky was picked to finish sixth in the conference.

=== Preseason rankings ===
C-USA Preseason Coaches Poll
Place	Team	Votes
1	Missouri State	90 (8)
2	Middle Tennessee	84 (1)
3	Liberty	83 (1)
4	FIU	70
5	Sam Houston	60
6	Western Kentucky	42
7	Delaware	37
8	New Mexico State	31
9	Jacksonville State	29
10	Kennesaw State	24
(#) first-place votes

=== Preseason All-CUSA Team ===
Preseason All-CUSA Team
Player	Year	Position
Trinity Rowe	Junior	Guard

== Roster ==
2026–27 Western Kentucky Lady Toppers women's basketball team
Players
Coaches

Pos.	#	Name	Height	Year	Previous school	Hometown
G	0	Lola Bond	5 ft 4 in (1.63 m)	So	Kettle Moraine High School	Pewaukee, WI
G	1	Jamila Ray	5 ft 7 in (1.7 m)	Fr	Montverde Academy	Orlando, FL
F	2	Torri James	6 ft 0 in (1.83 m)	Jr	Rossview High School	Clarksville, TN
G	5	Ava Moore	5 ft 10 in (1.78 m)	Fr	Assumption High School	Louisville, KY
G	7	Kamille Brown	5 ft 8 in (1.73 m)	Sr	Conway High School; Louisiana–Monroe	Conway, AR
G	10	Mafalda Fontan	5 ft 10 in (1.78 m)	Fr	Archbishop Riordan High School	Tui, Spain
G	11	Trinity Rowe	5 ft 5 in (1.65 m)	Jr	Pikeville High School; Southern Miss	Pikeville, KY
F	12	Ellery Minch	6 ft 3 in (1.91 m)	Jr	Mount Vernon High School; Murray State	Fortville, IN
C	14	Hayven Smith	6 ft 6 in (1.98 m)	Jr	Lincoln-Way East High School; Illinois	Frankfort, IL
F	20	Elif Naz Dal	6 ft 1 in (1.85 m)	RS Fr	Şerife Bacı 37	Adana, Turkey
G	21	Enni Ahervuo	5 ft 10 in (1.78 m)	So	Tapiolan Honka	Espoo, Finland
G	23	Elisa Coleman	6 ft 0 in (1.83 m)	Fr	Floyd Central High School	Georgetown, IN
F	33	Tatum Boettjer	6 ft 1 in (1.85 m)	RS Sr	Derby High School; Barton Community College	Derby, KS

Head coach

- Greg Collins (Louisville)

Assistant coach(es)

- Jon Plefka (Texas Tech)
- Whitney Creech (Western Kentucky)
- C'eira Ricketts (Arkansas)
- David Walls (Western Kentucky)

Legend

- (C) Team captain
- (S) Suspended
- (I) Ineligible
- (W) Walk-on
- Injured
- Current redshirt

Roster
Last update: July 16, 2026

== Schedule and results ==
Date time, TV	Rank^{#}	Opponent^{#}	Result	Record	High points	High rebounds	High assists	Site (attendance) city, state
Exhibition
October 31, 2026*; 2:00 p.m.		Young Harris	W 84–66		–	–	–	E. A. Diddle Arena; Bowling Green, KY
Non-conference regular season
November 4, 2026*; 6:30 p.m., ESPN+		Chattanooga	W 61–50	1–0	14 – Ray	10 – Gilvin	4 – Gilvin	E. A. Diddle Arena (698); Bowling Green, KY
November 8, 2026*; 2:00 p.m., ESPN+		Christian Brothers	W 94–43	2–0	25 – Ray	7 – Tied	5 – Gilvin	E. A. Diddle Arena (515); Bowling Green, KY
November 11, 2026*; 6:30 p.m., SECN+		at No. 8 Vanderbilt	L 59–101	2–1	15 – Smith	6 – Tied	6 – Brown	Memorial Gymnasium (3,190); Nashville, TN
November 16, 2026*; 6:30 p.m., ESPN+		at Kentucky State	W 85–49	3–1	19 – James	10 – Gilvin	4 – Gilvin	E. A. Diddle Arena (509); Bowling Green, KY
November 24, 2026*; TBA		Southern Illinois						E. A. Diddle Arena; Bowling Green, KY
November 27, 2026*; TBA		at Florida Atlantic; FAU Thanksgiving Classic						Eleanor R. Baldwin Arena; Boca Raton, FL
November 28, 2026*; TBA		vs. Morehead State; FAU Thanksgiving Classic						Eleanor R. Baldwin Arena; Boca Raton, FL
December 2, 2026*; TBA		at Campbell						Gore Arena; Buies Creek, NC
December 6, 2026*; TBA		at Evansville						Meeks Family Fieldhouse; Evansville, IN
December 13, 2026*; TBA		Miami (OH)						E. A. Diddle Arena; Bowling Green, KY
December 16, 2026*; TBA		at Holy Cross						Hart Center; Worcester, MA
December 19, 2026*; TBA		at Yale						John J. Lee Amphitheater; New Haven, CT
December 29, 2026*; TBA		Arkansas Tech						E. A. Diddle Arena; Bowling Green, KY
C-USA regular season
January 2, 2027; TBA		Kennesaw State						E. A. Diddle Arena; Bowling Green, KY
January 4, 2027; TBA		Jacksonville State						E. A. Diddle Arena; Bowling Green, KY
January 8, 2027; TBA		at New Mexico State						Pan American Center; Las Cruces, NM
January 10, 2027; TBA		at Sam Houston						Bernard Johnson Coliseum; Huntsville, TX
January 14, 2027; TBA		Delaware						E. A. Diddle Arena; Bowling Green, KY
January 16, 2027; TBA		Liberty						E. A. Diddle Arena; Bowling Green, KY
January 21, 2027; TBA		at Missouri State						Great Southern Bank Arena; Springfield, MO
January 23, 2027; TBA		at FIU						Ocean Bank Convocation Center; Miami, FL
January 30, 2027; TBA		at Middle Tennessee						Murphy Center; Murfreesboro, TN
February 4, 2027; TBA		Sam Houston						E. A. Diddle Arena; Bowling Green, KY
February 6, 2027; TBA		New Mexico State						E. A. Diddle Arena; Bowling Green, KY
February 11, 2027; TBA		at Liberty						Liberty Arena; Lynchburg, VA
February 13, 2027; TBA		at Delaware						Bob Carpenter Center; Newark, DE
February 18, 2027; TBA		FIU						E. A. Diddle Arena; Bowling Green, KY
February 20, 2027; TBA		Missouri State						E. A. Diddle Arena; Bowling Green, KY
February 27, 2027; TBA		Middle Tennessee						E. A. Diddle Arena; Bowling Green, KY
March 4, 2027; TBA		at Jacksonville State						Pete Mathews Coliseum; Jacksonville, AL
March 6, 2027; TBA		at Kennesaw State						VyStar Arena; Kennesaw, GA
C-USA tournament
March 9–13, 2027; TBA		vs.						Propst Arena; Huntsville, AL
*Non-conference game. ^{#}Rankings from AP Poll. (#) Tournament seedings in parentheses. All times are in Central.
