= 2026–27 Jacksonville State Gamecocks women's basketball team =

American college basketball season

2026–27 Jacksonville State Gamecocks women's basketball
- Conference: Conference USA
- Record: 0–0 (0–0 C-USA)
- Head coach: Ricky Austin (1st season)
- Assistant coaches: Toni West; Cooper Austin; Tuti Jones
- Home arena: Pete Mathews Coliseum

2026–27 Conference USA women's basketball standings
	Conf.				Overall
Team	W		L	PCT	W		L	PCT
Delaware	0	–	0	–	0	–	0	–
FIU	0	–	0	–	0	–	0	–
Jacksonville State	0	–	0	–	0	–	0	–
Kennesaw State	0	–	0	–	0	–	0	–
Liberty	0	–	0	–	0	–	0	–
Middle Tennessee	0	–	0	–	0	–	0	–
Missouri State	0	–	0	–	0	–	0	–
New Mexico State	0	–	0	–	0	–	0	–
Sam Houston	0	–	0	–	0	–	0	–
Western Kentucky	0	–	0	–	0	–	0	–
† 2027 CUSA tournament winner

The 2026–27 Jacksonville State Gamecocks women's basketball team will represent Jacksonville State University during the 2026–27 NCAA Division I women's basketball season. The Gamecocks, led by first-year head coach Ricky Austin, will play their home games at the Pete Mathews Coliseum in Jacksonville, Alabama as members of Conference USA.

== Previous season ==
The Gamecocks finished the 2025–26 season 16–16 overall and 9–9 in C-USA play, finishing seventh in the conference. As the No. 7 seed in the C-USA tournament, they defeated No. 10 UTEP in the first round in double overtime 82–77, before losing to No. 2 FIU 66–76 in the quarterfinals to end their season.

On March 12, the day after their elimination from the tournament, it was announced that head coach Rick Pietri would be retiring after 13 seasons with the program. On March 30, athletics vice president Greg Seitz announced the hiring of longtime high school coach Ricky Austin as the program's new head coach.

== Offseason ==
=== Departures ===
Jacksonville State departures
Name	Num	Pos.	Height	Year	Hometown	Reason for departure
Eden Sample	1	Guard	5'10"	(redshirt) Senior	Suwanee, GA	Graduated
Maša Buzic	4	Guard	5'11"	Sophomore	Belgrade, Serbia	TBD; entered transfer portal 4/6/2026
Mearah Whitehead	5	Guard	5'8"	Freshman	Lawrenceville, GA	Transferred to Wofford
Vitória Carvalho	11	Forward/Center	6'3"	5th Year	Rio de Janeiro, Brazil	Exhausted eligibility
Abril Ricart-Mensah	13	Guard	5'9"	Freshman	Barcelona, Spain	Transferred to Hutchinson CC (NJCAA)
Makala Hobdy	15	Guard	5'6"	Junior	Troy, AL	Transferred to Alabama State
Mya Barnes	22	Forward	6'0"	5th Year	Montgomery, AL	Exhausted eligibility
Adriana Jones	23	Guard	5'6"	Senior	Newbern, AL	Graduated
Brooklyn McDaniel	32	Forward	5'11"	Senior	Heflin, AL	Graduated
Jasmine Baxter	50	Center	6'1"	Freshman	Locust Grove, GA	Transferred to Tallahassee State (NJCAA)
María Sánchez-Ponce	71	Forward	5'10"	Senior	Conil de la Frontera, Spain	Graduated

=== Incoming transfers ===
Jacksonville State incoming transfers
Name	Num	Pos.	Height	Year	Hometown	Previous school
Gabby Morales	0	Guard	5'9"	Junior	Lubbock, TX	Collin (NJCAA)
Kamryn Corporan	1	Guard	5'6"	Junior	Miami, FL	Northwest Florida State (NJCAA)
Emily Monson	11	Guard	6'1"	Senior	Murfreesboro, TN	Middle Tennessee
Rocío Jiménez	13	Center	6'7"	(redshirt) Junior	Elías Piña, Dominican Republic	Mississippi State
Meja Hänsel	33	Forward	6'2"	Sophomore	Stockholm, Sweden	UCF
Camden Ward	34	Forward	6'0"	Sophomore	Smyrna, TN	UT Martin

=== Recruiting class ===
There was no 2026 recruiting class.

== Preseason ==
On October 8, 2026, Conference USA released its annual preseason coaches poll and awards. Jacksonville State was picked to finish eighth in the conference.

=== Preseason rankings ===
C-USA Preseason Coaches Poll
Place	Team	Votes
1	Missouri State	90 (8)
2	Middle Tennessee	84 (1)
3	Liberty	83 (1)
4	FIU	70
5	Sam Houston	60
6	Western Kentucky	42
7	Delaware	37
8	New Mexico State	31
9	Jacksonville State	29
10	Kennesaw State	24
(#) first-place votes

=== Preseason All-CUSA Team ===
No players were named to the Preseason All-CUSA Team.

== Roster ==
2026–27 Jacksonville State Gamecocks women's basketball team
Players
Coaches

Pos.	#	Name	Height	Year	Previous school	Hometown
G	0	Gabby Morales	5 ft 9 in (1.75 m)	Jr	Frenship High School; Collin College	Lubbock, TX
G	1	Kamryn Corporan	5 ft 6 in (1.68 m)	Jr	St. Thomas Aquinas High School; Northwest Florida State College	Miami, FL
G	5	Nahia Fernandez	5 ft 11 in (1.8 m)	Fr		Madrid, Spain
G	6	Solene Jackson	6 ft 0 in (1.83 m)	Fr	Holy Cross Regional High School	Vancouver, Canada
G	7	Kayna Chnina	5 ft 8 in (1.73 m)	Fr		Chanteloup, France
F	10	Anna Skog	6 ft 2 in (1.88 m)	Fr	IMG Academy	Stockholm, Sweden
G	11	Emily Monson	6 ft 1 in (1.85 m)	Sr	Blackman High School; Middle Tennessee	Murfreesboro, TN
C	13	Rocío Jiménez	6 ft 7 in (2.01 m)	RS Jr	Mississippi State	Elías Piña, Dominican Republic
F	14	Mina Djurdjevic	6 ft 1 in (1.85 m)	So	Central Pointe Christian Academy	Belgrade, Serbia
G	21	Kyera Thornsbury	5 ft 7 in (1.7 m)	Jr	Pikeville High School	Belfry, Kentucky
F	33	Meja Hänsel	6 ft 2 in (1.88 m)	So	Luleå gymnasieskola	Stockholm, Sweden
F	34	Camden Ward	6 ft 0 in (1.83 m)	So	Stewarts Creek High School	Smyrna, TN

Head coach

- Ricky Austin

Assistant coach(es)

- Toni West (Shelton State)
- Cooper Austin (Jacksonville State)
- Tuti Jones (Belmont)

Legend

- (C) Team captain
- (S) Suspended
- (I) Ineligible
- (W) Walk-on
- Injured
- Current redshirt

Roster
Last update: July 13, 2026

== Schedule and results ==
Date time, TV	Rank^{#}	Opponent^{#}	Result	Record	High points	High rebounds	High assists	Site (attendance) city, state
Non-conference regular season
November 2, 2026*; TBA		Oglethorpe						Pete Mathews Coliseum; Jacksonville, AL
November 6, 2026*; TBA		Life						Pete Mathews Coliseum; Jacksonville, AL
November 9, 2026*; TBA		North Alabama						Pete Mathews Coliseum; Jacksonville, AL
November 16, 2026*; TBA		at Southern Miss						Reed Green Coliseum; Hattiesburg, MS
November 20, 2026*; TBA		at North Dakota						Betty Engelstad Sioux Center; Grand Forks, ND
November 27, 2026*; 4:00 p.m.		at UC Irvine; ZotGiving Classic						Bren Events Center; Irvine, CA
November 28, 2026*; 4:00 p.m.		vs. Wyoming; ZotGiving Classic						Bren Events Center; Irvine, CA
December 2, 2026*; TBA		at Mercer						Hawkins Arena; Macon, GA
December 9, 2026*; TBA		Point						Pete Mathews Coliseum; Jacksonville, AL
December 15, 2026*; TBA		at Wichita State						Charles Koch Arena; Wichita, KS
December 18, 2026*; TBA		at Missouri						Mizzou Arena; Columbia, MO
December 20, 2026*; TBA		Presbyterian						Pete Mathews Coliseum; Jacksonville, AL
C-USA regular season
January 2, 2027; TBA		at Middle Tennessee						Murphy Center; Murfreesboro, TN
January 4, 2027; TBA		at Western Kentucky						E. A. Diddle Arena; Bowling Green, KY
January 10, 2027; TBA		Kennesaw State						Pete Mathews Coliseum; Jacksonville, AL
January 14, 2027; TBA		New Mexico State						Pete Mathews Coliseum; Jacksonville, AL
January 16, 2027; TBA		Sam Houston						Pete Mathews Coliseum; Jacksonville, AL
January 21, 2027; TBA		at Liberty						Liberty Arena; Lynchburg, VA
January 23, 2027; TBA		at Delaware						Acierno Arena; Newark, DE
January 28, 2027; TBA		FIU						Pete Mathews Coliseum; Jacksonville, AL
January 30, 2027; TBA		Missouri State						Pete Mathews Coliseum; Jacksonville, AL
February 6, 2027; TBA		at Kennesaw State						VyStar Arena; Kennesaw, GA
February 11, 2027; TBA		at Sam Houston						Bernard Johnson Coliseum; Huntsville, TX
February 13, 2027; TBA		at New Mexico State						Pan American Center; Las Cruces, NM
February 18, 2027; TBA		Delaware						Pete Mathews Coliseum; Jacksonville, AL
February 20, 2027; TBA		Liberty						Pete Mathews Coliseum; Jacksonville, AL
February 25, 2027; TBA		at FIU						Ocean Bank Convocation Center; Miami, FL
February 27, 2027; TBA		at Missouri State						Great Southern Bank Arena; Springfield, MO
March 4, 2027; TBA		Western Kentucky						Pete Mathews Coliseum; Jacksonville, AL
March 6, 2027; TBA		Middle Tennessee						Pete Mathews Coliseum; Jacksonville, AL
C-USA tournament
March 9–13, 2027; TBA		vs.						Propst Arena; Huntsville, AL
*Non-conference game. ^{#}Rankings from AP Poll. (#) Tournament seedings in parentheses. All times are in Central.
