= 2026–27 FIU Panthers women's basketball team =

American college basketball season

2026–27 FIU Panthers women's basketball
- Conference: Conference USA
- Record: 0–1 (0–0 C-USA)
- Head coach: Jesyka Burks-Wiley (6th season)
- Assistant coaches: Christelle N'Garsanet; Dan Wendt; Heather Karner
- Home arena: Ocean Bank Convocation Center

2026–27 Conference USA women's basketball standings
	Conf.				Overall
Team	W		L	PCT	W		L	PCT
Jacksonville State	0	–	0	–	1	–	0	1.000
Kennesaw State	0	–	0	–	1	–	0	1.000
Liberty	0	–	0	–	1	–	0	1.000
Middle Tennessee	0	–	0	–	1	–	0	1.000
Missouri State	0	–	0	–	1	–	0	1.000
Sam Houston	0	–	0	–	1	–	0	1.000
Delaware	0	–	0	–	0	–	0	–
Western Kentucky	0	–	0	–	0	–	0	–
FIU	0	–	0	–	0	–	1	.000
New Mexico State	0	–	0	–	0	–	1	.000
† 2027 CUSA tournament winner As of November 4, 2026

The 2026–27 FIU Panthers women's basketball team currently represents Florida International University during the 2026–27 NCAA Division I women's basketball season. The Panthers, led by sixth-year head coach Jesyka Burks-Wiley, play their home games at the Ocean Bank Convocation Center in Miami, Florida, and compete as a member of Conference USA.

== Previous season ==
The Panthers finished the 2025–26 season 21–12 and 12–6 in C-USA play, finishing second in the conference. As the No. 2 seed in the Conference USA tournament, they defeated No. 7 Jacksonville State 76–66 in the quarterfinals before suffering a 69–74 upset in the semifinals to eventual tournament winners No. 6 Missouri State.

As a 2-seed team that did not receive a bid to the NCAA tournament or the WBIT, the Panthers received and accepted an automatic bid to the WNIT, making it their ninth appearance and first since 2024. They narrowly defeated Stetson 76–73 in Round 1, then eliminated in Round 2 by Abilene Christian 66–77 to end their season.

== Offseason ==
=== Departures ===
FIU departures
Name	Num	Pos.	Height	Year	Hometown	Reason for departure
Denika Lightbourne	0	Guard	5'9"	Junior	Nassau, Bahamas	Transferred to Florida Gulf Coast
Judit Valero	1	Guard	5'11"	Junior	Barcelona, Spain	Transferred to Butler
Parris Atkins	10	Guard	5'8"	Senior	Little Rock, AR	Graduated
Astou Ndiaye	12	Forward	6'1"	Freshman	Thiès, Senegal	Transferred to Bryant
Astrid Mukulumpe	13	Forward	6'4"	Sophomore	Orléans, France	Transferred to Tarleton State
Ndate Ndiaye	14	Guard	5'10"	Sophomore	Thiès, Senegal	Transferred to Bryant
Rhema Collins	23	Guard	6'2"	Junior	Nassau, Bahamas	Transferred to Texas Tech
Selene Romero	24	Forward	6'5"	Sophomore	Guanajuato, Mexico	Transferred to Long Beach State
Isamery Telleria	30	Guard	5'9"	Graduate student	San Francisco de Macorís, Dominican Republic	Graduated
Claudia Marina	44	Forward	5'11"	Sophomore	Madrid, Spain	Transferred to Merrimack

=== Incoming transfers ===
FIU incoming transfers
Name	Num	Pos.	Height	Year	Hometown	Previous school
Shorna Preston	3	Forward	6'1"	Senior	Gold Coast, Australia	Pepperdine
Mable Doumbia	6	Guard	6'0"	Junior	Bamako, Mali	Arizona Western (NJCAA)
Chloe Emanga	8	Guard	5'9"	Sophomore	Marbach am Neckar, Germany	Seattle
Malia Tharpe	12	Forward	6'0"	Senior	Cottesloe, Australia	San Diego
BreAunna Ward	21	Guard	5'10"	Sophomore	St. Louis, MO	Evansville
Frode Flos van der Schans	24	Forward	6'4"	(redshirt) Senior	Amsterdam, Netherlands	Chattanooga
Mio Sakano	30	Guard	5'10"	Senior	Yamanashi, Japan	Miami (OH)

=== Recruiting class ===
There was no 2026 recruiting class.

== Preseason ==
On October 8, 2026, Conference USA released its annual preseason coaches poll and awards. FIU was picked to finish fourth in the conference.

=== Preseason rankings ===
C-USA Preseason Coaches Poll
Place	Team	Votes
1	Missouri State	90 (8)
2	Middle Tennessee	84 (1)
3	Liberty	83 (1)
4	FIU	70
5	Sam Houston	60
6	Western Kentucky	42
7	Delaware	37
8	New Mexico State	31
9	Jacksonville State	29
10	Kennesaw State	24
(#) first-place votes

=== Preseason All-CUSA Team ===
No players were named to the Preseason All-CUSA Team.

== Roster ==
Years are listed according to the new NCAA age-based eligibility model.

2026–27 FIU Panthers women's basketball team
Players
Coaches

Pos.	#	Name	Height	Year	Previous school	Hometown
G	0	Riley Burd	6 ft 0 in (1.83 m)	Sr	Iona Presentation College; Midland College	Perth, Australia
G	1	Madussou Bamba	5 ft 7 in (1.7 m)	Fr	Lycée Polyvalent Toulouse Bellevue	Paris, France
G	2	Adama Badjie Coly	5 ft 8 in (1.73 m)	Sr	IES Miquel Biada; Casper College	Mataró, Spain
F	3	Shorna Preston	6 ft 1 in (1.85 m)	Sr	Hillcrest Christian College; Pepperdine	Gold Coast, Australia
G	5	Grecia Ferrer Leal	5 ft 6 in (1.68 m)	So	Institut La Llauna	Badalona, Spain
G	6	Mable Doumbia	6 ft 0 in (1.83 m)	Jr	Lycee yaya Coulibaly; Arizona Western College	Bamako, Mali
G	8	Chloe Emanga	5 ft 9 in (1.75 m)	So	Seattle Redhawks	Marbach am Neckar, Germany
G	10	Paula Acin	5 ft 5 in (1.65 m)	Fr	Institució Les Alzines	Girona, Spain
F	12	Malia Tharpe	6 ft 0 in (1.83 m)	Sr	Shenton College; San Diego	Cottesloe, Australia
G	15	Fantasia James	5 ft 9 in (1.75 m)	RS Jr	Oakleaf High School	Orange Park, FL
G	21	BreAunna Ward	5 ft 10 in (1.78 m)	So	John Burroughs School; Evansville	St. Louis, MO
F	24	Flode Flos van der Schans	6 ft 4 in (1.93 m)	RS Sr	Chattanooga	Amsterdam, Netherlands
G	30	Mio Sakano	5 ft 10 in (1.78 m)	Sr	IMG Academy; Miami (OH)	Yamanashi, Japan
F	34	Mariss Miekountima	6 ft 4 in (1.93 m)	Fr	Lycée Professionnel Jean Mermoz	Argences, France

Head coach

- Jesyka Burks-Wiley (Boston University)

Assistant coach(es)

- Christelle N'Garsanet (Missouri)
- Dan Wendt (West Valley)
- Heather Karner (Youngstown State)

Legend

- (C) Team captain
- (S) Suspended
- (I) Ineligible
- (W) Walk-on
- Injured
- Current redshirt

Roster
Last update: October 8, 2026

== Schedule and results ==
Date time, TV	Rank^{#}	Opponent^{#}	Result	Record	High points	High rebounds	High assists	Site (attendance) city, state
Non-conference regular season
November 3, 2026*; TBA		Jacksonville	L 64–75	0–1	19 – James	8 – Preston	6 – Ferrer Leal	Ocean Bank Convocation Center (156); Miami, FL
November 10, 2026*; TBA		Stetson						Ocean Bank Convocation Center; Miami, FL
November 15, 2026*; TBA		at South Florida						Yuengling Center; Tampa, FL
November 19, 2026*; TBA		at Miami (FL)						Watsco Center; Coral Gables, FL
November 27, 2026*; TBA		North Dakota; FIU Thanksgiving Tournament semifinals						Ocean Bank Convocation Center; Miami, FL
November 29, 2026*; TBA		Northern Illinois or Manhattan; FIU Thanksgiving Tournament						Ocean Bank Convocation Center; Miami, FL
December 5, 2026*; TBA		Florida Atlantic						Ocean Bank Convocation Center; Miami, FL
December 12, 2026*; TBA		at Georgia Southern						Hill Convocation Center; Statesboro, GA
December 18, 2026*; TBA		Morgan State; FIU Holiday Classic						Ocean Bank Convocation Center; Miami, FL
December 19, 2026*; TBA		North Carolina Central; FIU Holiday Classic						Ocean Bank Convocation Center; Miami, FL
C-USA regular season
January 2, 2027; TBA		New Mexico State						Ocean Bank Convocation Center; Miami, FL
January 4, 2027; TBA		Sam Houston						Ocean Bank Convocation Center; Miami, FL
January 8, 2027; TBA		at Liberty						Liberty Arena; Lynchburg, VA
January 10, 2027; TBA		at Delaware						Bob Carpenter Center; Newark, DE
January 16, 2027; TBA		at Missouri State						Great Southern Bank Arena; Springfield, MO
January 21, 2027; TBA		Middle Tennessee						Ocean Bank Convocation Center; Miami, FL
January 23, 2027; TBA		Western Kentucky						Ocean Bank Convocation Center; Miami, FL
January 28, 2027; TBA		at Jacksonville State						Pete Mathews Coliseum; Jacksonville, AL
January 30, 2027; TBA		at Kennesaw State						VyStar Arena; Kennesaw, GA
February 4, 2027; TBA		Delaware						Ocean Bank Convocation Center; Miami, FL
February 6, 2027; TBA		Liberty						Ocean Bank Convocation Center; Miami, FL
February 13, 2027; TBA		Missouri State						Ocean Bank Convocation Center; Miami, FL
February 18, 2027; TBA		at Western Kentucky						E. A. Diddle Arena; Bowling Green, KY
February 20, 2027; TBA		at Middle Tennessee						Murphy Center; Murfreesboro, TN
February 25, 2027; TBA		Jacksonville State						Ocean Bank Convocation Center; Miami, FL
February 27, 2027; TBA		Kennesaw State						Ocean Bank Convocation Center; Miami, FL
March 4, 2027; TBA		at Sam Houston						Bernard Johnson Coliseum; Huntsville, TX
March 6, 2027; TBA		at New Mexico State						Pan American Center; Las Cruces, NM
C-USA tournament
March 9–13, 2027; TBA		vs.						Propst Arena; Huntsville, AL
*Non-conference game. ^{#}Rankings from AP Poll. (#) Tournament seedings in parentheses. All times are in Eastern.
