= 2026–27 Middle Tennessee Blue Raiders women's basketball team =

American college basketball season

2026–27 Middle Tennessee Blue Raiders women's basketball
- Conference: Conference USA
- Record: 1–0 (0–0 C-USA)
- Head coach: Matt Insell (1st season)
- Assistant coaches: Kim Brewton; Nina Davis; Tom Hodges; Jalynn Gregory; Shelby Davis
- Home arena: Murphy Center

2026–27 Conference USA women's basketball standings
	Conf.				Overall
Team	W		L	PCT	W		L	PCT
Jacksonville State	0	–	0	–	1	–	0	1.000
Kennesaw State	0	–	0	–	1	–	0	1.000
Liberty	0	–	0	–	1	–	0	1.000
Middle Tennessee	0	–	0	–	1	–	0	1.000
Missouri State	0	–	0	–	1	–	0	1.000
Sam Houston	0	–	0	–	1	–	0	1.000
Delaware	0	–	0	–	0	–	0	–
Western Kentucky	0	–	0	–	0	–	0	–
FIU	0	–	0	–	0	–	1	.000
New Mexico State	0	–	0	–	0	–	1	.000
† 2027 CUSA tournament winner As of November 5, 2026

The 2026–27 Middle Tennessee Blue Raiders women's basketball team currently represents Middle Tennessee State University during the 2026–27 NCAA Division I women's basketball season. The Blue Raiders, led by first-year head coach Matt Insell who took over following his father and previous head coach Rick Insell's retirement, play their home games at the Murphy Center in Murfreesboro, Tennessee and compete as a member of Conference USA.

== Previous season ==
The Blue Raiders finished the 2025–26 season 17–16 overall and 11–7 in C-USA play, finishing third in the conference. They were eliminated from the C-USA tournament in a 66–69 loss to eventual tournament winners No. 6 Missouri State in the quarterfinals.

The Blue Raiders later earned and accepted an at-large bid to the WNIT, their 9th appearance and first since 2022. They earned a bye to Round 2, where they defeated St. Bonaventure 69–50 to advance to the Super 16, where they were eliminated by Cleveland State 56–66 to end their season.

On March 19, 2026, it was announced that longtime head coach Rick Insell would retire at the conclusion of the season. His son, associate head coach Matt Insell, would take over in his place. Insell retired as the all-time winningest coach in program history, men's or women's, posting 505 wins.

== Offseason ==
=== Departures ===
Middle Tennessee departures
Name	Num	Pos.	Height	Year	Hometown	Reason for departure
Yu Han Lin	1	Guard	5'9"	Freshman	Hualien City, Taiwan	Transferred to Marquette
Alayna Contreras	3	Guard	5'6"	Senior	Minneapolis, MN	Graduated
Emily Monson	11	Guard	6'1"	Junior	Murfreesboro, TN	Transferred to Jacksonville State
Savannah Davis	14	Guard	5'10"	Sophomore	McKenzie, TN	Transferred to Tennessee Tech
Macie Phifer	21	Guard	6'1"	Freshman	New Albany, MS	Transferred to Mississippi State

=== Incoming transfers ===
Middle Tennessee incoming transfers
Name	Num	Pos.	Height	Year	Hometown	Previous school
Xai Whitfield	1	Guard	5'9"	Junior	Oxford, AL	Tennessee State
Kennedi Neale	3	Guard	5'10"	Sophomore	Strongsville, OH	Lynn (D-II)
Mya Koné	8	Guard	6'2"	Senior	Pompano Beach, FL	Miami (FL)
Elisa Mehyar	16	Forward	6'5"	Junior	Copenhagen, Denmark	Oregon State

=== Recruiting class ===
College recruiting
Name	Hometown	School	Height	Weight	Commit date
Aaliyah Blanchard; G	Birmingham, AL	Hoover High School	5 ft 11 in (1.80 m)	N/A	
Aaliyah Blanchard; G	Recruit ratings: ESPN: (93)				
Overall recruit ranking:
Note: In many cases, Scout, Rivals, 247Sports, On3, and ESPN may conflict in their listings of height and weight.; In these cases, the average was taken. ESPN grades are on a 100-point scale.; Sources:

== Preseason ==
On October 8, 2026, Conference USA released its annual preseason coaches poll and awards. Middle Tennessee was picked to finish second in the conference, along with one out of ten first place votes.

=== Preseason rankings ===
C-USA Preseason Coaches Poll
Place	Team	Votes
1	Missouri State	90 (8)
2	Middle Tennessee	84 (1)
3	Liberty	83 (1)
4	FIU	70
5	Sam Houston	60
6	Western Kentucky	42
7	Delaware	37
8	New Mexico State	31
9	Jacksonville State	29
10	Kennesaw State	24
(#) first-place votes

=== Preseason All-CUSA Team ===
Preseason All-CUSA Team
Player	Year	Position
Blair Baugus	Sophomore	Guard
Mya Koné	Senior	Guard

== Roster ==
2026–27 Middle Tennessee Blue Raiders women's basketball team
Players
Coaches

Pos.	#	Name	Height	Year	Previous school	Hometown
G	0	Gracie Hamby	5 ft 8 in (1.73 m)	RS Sr	Blackman High School	Murfreesboro, TN
G	1	Xai Whitfield	5 ft 9 in (1.75 m)	Jr	Oxford High School; Tennessee State	Oxford, AL
G	2	Maayan Cohen	5 ft 6 in (1.68 m)	Fr		Holon, Israel
G	3	Kennedi Neale	5 ft 10 in (1.78 m)	So	Strongsville High School; Lynn	Strongsville, OH
G	4	McLayne Bobo	5 ft 10 in (1.78 m)	Fr	Tullahoma High School	Tullahoma, TN
G	8	Mya Koné	6 ft 2 in (1.88 m)	Sr	Miami (FL)	Pompano Beach, FL
G	10	Kirston Verhulst	5 ft 8 in (1.73 m)	So	Bishop Miege High School	De Soto, KS
G	11	Carsyn Swaney	6 ft 0 in (1.83 m)	So	Heritage High School	Maryville, TN
G	12	Blair Baugus	6 ft 1 in (1.85 m)	So	Wayne County High School	Waynesboro, TN
F	13	Jenna McClendon	6 ft 4 in (1.93 m)	So	Prattville Christian Academy	Deatsville, AL
G	14	Aaliyah Blanchard	5 ft 11 in (1.8 m)	Fr	Hoover High School	Hoover, AL
C	15	Nicole Dominguez	6 ft 10 in (2.08 m)	So	Segle XXI	Santa Cruz de Tenerife, Spain
F	16	Elisa Mehyar	6 ft 5 in (1.96 m)	Jr	Oregon State	Copenhagen, Denmark
F	24	Stanislava Kabernick	6 ft 1 in (1.85 m)	RS Jr	Olympic Reserve School No. 1	Saint Petersburg, Russia
G	29	Nora Ahamadi	5 ft 10 in (1.78 m)	RS Fr	INSEP	Salon-de-Provence, France

Head coach

- Matt Insell (Middle Tennessee)

Assistant coach(es)

- Kim Brewton (Liberty)
- Nina Davis (Baylor)
- Tom Hodges (Tennessee Tech)
- Jalynn Gregory (Middle Tennessee)
- Shelby Davis (Middle Tennessee)

Legend

- (C) Team captain
- (S) Suspended
- (I) Ineligible
- (W) Walk-on
- Injured
- Current redshirt

Roster
Last update: July 13, 2026

== Schedule and results ==
Date time, TV	Rank^{#}	Opponent^{#}	Result	Record	High points	High rebounds	High assists	Site (attendance) city, state
Exhibition
October 19, 2026*; 6:30 p.m.		Lemoyne–Owen	W 112–48		24 – Koné	9 – Baugus	3 – Cohen	Murphy Center (2,611); Murfreesboro, TN
October 26, 2026*; 6:30 p.m.		Johnson	W 100–45		–	–	–	Murphy Center; Murfreesboro, TN
Non-conference regular season
November 2, 2026*; 6:30 p.m., ESPN+		Saint Louis	W 91–84 ^{OT}	1–0	23 – Baugus	12 – Baugus	4 – Tied	Murphy Center (2,657); Murfreesboro, TN
November 6, 2026*; 6:00 p.m., ESPN+		at Memphis						Elma Roane Fieldhouse; Memphis, TN
November 12, 2026*; 5:30 p.m., SECN+/ESPN+		at Tennessee						Thompson–Boling Arena; Knoxville, TN
November 16, 2026*; 6:30 p.m., ESPN+		Tennessee Tech						Murphy Center; Murfreesboro, TN
November 20, 2026*; 6:00 p.m., SECN+/ESPN+		at Auburn						Neville Arena; Auburn, AL
November 23, 2026*; 11:00 a.m., Spiideo		vs. Oregon State; Jacksonville Classic						The Reef; Jacksonville, FL
November 25, 2026*; 3:00 p.m., Spiideo		vs. Montana State; Jacksonville Classic						The Reef; Jacksonville, FL
November 30, 2026*; 6:30 p.m., ESPN+		Lipscomb						Murphy Center; Murfreesboro, TN
December 3, 2026*; 10:30 a.m., ESPN+		Southern Indiana						Murphy Center; Murfreesboro, TN
December 6, 2026*; 1:00 p.m., ESPN+		Wichita State						Murphy Center; Murfreesboro, TN
December 13, 2026*; 2:00 p.m.		at Belmont						Curb Event Center; Nashville, TN
December 17, 2026*; 6:00 p.m., ESPN+		Rice						Murphy Center; Murfreesboro, TN
December 20, 2026*; 5:30 p.m., WSN		vs. Tulsa; Cherokee Invitational						Harrah's Cherokee; Cherokee, NC
December 21, 2026*; 5:30 p.m., WSN		vs. South Florida; Cherokee Invitational						Harrah's Cherokee; Cherokee, NC
C-USA regular season
January 2, 2027; 2:00 p.m., ESPN+		Jacksonville State						Murphy Center; Murfreesboro, TN
January 4, 2027; TBA		Kennesaw State						Murphy Center; Murfreesboro, TN
January 8, 2027; TBA		at Sam Houston						Bernard Johnson Coliseum; Huntsville, TX
January 10, 2027; TBA		at New Mexico State						Pan American Center; Las Cruces, NM
January 14, 2027; 6:00 p.m., ESPNU		Liberty						Murphy Center; Murfreesboro, TN
January 16, 2027; TBA		Delaware						Murphy Center; Murfreesboro, TN
January 21, 2027; TBA		at FIU						Ocean Bank Convocation Center; Miami, FL
January 23, 2027; TBA		at Missouri State						Great Southern Bank Arena; Springfield, MO
January 30, 2027; TBA		Western Kentucky						Murphy Center; Murfreesboro, TN
February 4, 2027; TBA		New Mexico State						Murphy Center; Murfreesboro, TN
February 6, 2027; TBA		Sam Houston						Murphy Center; Murfreesboro, TN
February 11, 2027; TBA		at Delaware						Acierno Arena; Newark, DE
February 13, 2027; TBA		at Liberty						Liberty Arena; Lynchburg, VA
February 18, 2027; TBA		Missouri State						Murphy Center; Murfreesboro, TN
February 20, 2027; TBA		FIU						Murphy Center; Murfreesboro, TN
February 27, 2027; TBA		at Western Kentucky						E. A. Diddle Arena; Bowling Green, KY
March 4, 2027; TBA		at Kennesaw State						VyStar Arena; Kennesaw, GA
March 6, 2027; TBA		at Jacksonville State						Pete Mathews Coliseum; Jacksonville, AL
C-USA tournament
March 9–13, 2027; TBA		vs.						Propst Arena; Huntsville, AL
*Non-conference game. ^{#}Rankings from AP Poll. (#) Tournament seedings in parentheses. All times are in Eastern.
