= Alexis Sherard =

American basketball coach (born 1972)

Current position
- Title: Head coach
- Team: Liberty
- Conference: C-USA
- Record: 18–13 (.581)

Biographical details
- Born: March 13, 1970 (age 56); Lakewood Township, New Jersey, U.S.

Playing career
- 1989–1993: Saint Michael's

Coaching career (HC unless noted)
- 1993–1995: Saint Michael's (asst.)/Men's
- 1995–1996: Lakewood Prep (boys)
- 1996–1998: Providence (asst.)/Men's
- 1998–1999: Binghamton (asst.)/Men's
- 2002–2003: Virginia (asst.)/Men's
- 2004–2005: Virginia (asst.)/Men's
- 2005–2007: Liberty (asst.)/Men's
- 2007–2025: Liberty (asst.)
- 2025–present: Liberty

Administrative career (AD unless noted)
- 1999–2002: Virginia (director of operations)/Men's
- 2003–2004: Virginia (director of operations)/Men's

Head coaching record
- Overall: 18–13 (.581) (college); 17–5 (.773) (high school)

Alexis Sherard (born March 13, 1970) is an American basketball coach who is the head coach for the Liberty Lady Flames of Liberty University. Sherard had been an assistant coach to Carey Green for the Lady Flames for the previous eighteen seasons. He had previously been an assistant coach for the men's teams of notable programs such as Providence and Virginia.

== Personal life and coaching ==
Sherard is from Lakewood Township, New Jersey and graduated from Saint Michael's College with a bachelor's degree in both education and mathematics. He has two children. He and his wife Jennifer live in Lynchburg, Virginia.

=== Coaching ===
Following his graduation from college, Sherard entered coaching in men's basketball, spending fourteen seasons at various collegiate and preparatory programs. In 2007, he switched from men's basketball to women's basketball, joining the staff of Carey Green at Liberty University. He had previously served as a men's assistant coach for the Flames during the 2005–06 and 2006–07 seasons under Randy Dunton. In 2017, Sherard was promoted from assistant coach to associate head coach under Green, a position he held for the following seven seasons.

On August 28, 2025, three months before the start of the 2025–26 basketball season, Green unexpectedly retired, concluding his coaching career after twenty-six seasons as head coach of the Lady Flames. Sherard was promoted to head coach and officially took over the position on September 15, 2025.

== Head coaching record ==
=== Preparatory ===
Record table
Season	Team	Overall	Conference	Standing	Postseason
Lakewood Prep (NJSIAA) (1995–1996)
1995-96	Lakewood Prep	17–5			Loss Semifinals
Total:		17–5 (.773)			
National champion Postseason invitational champion Conference regular season champion Conference regular season and conference tournament champion Division regular season champion Division regular season and conference tournament champion Conference tournament champion

=== Collegiate ===
Record table
Season	Team	Overall	Conference	Standing	Postseason
Liberty (Conference USA) (2025–present)
2025–26	Liberty	18–13	11–7	T–3rd	
2026–27	Liberty				
Liberty:		18–13 (.581)	11–7 (.611)		
Total:		18–13 (.581)			
National champion Postseason invitational champion Conference regular season champion Conference regular season and conference tournament champion Division regular season champion Division regular season and conference tournament champion Conference tournament champion
