= 2026–27 New Mexico State Aggies women's basketball team =

American college basketball season

2026–27 New Mexico State Aggies women's basketball
- Conference: Conference USA
- Record: 0–0 (0–0 C-USA)
- Head coach: Adeniyi Amadou (1st season)
- Associate head coach: Asami Morita, Vonn Read
- Assistant coach: Adeola Akomolafe
- Home arena: Pan American Center

2026–27 Conference USA women's basketball standings
	Conf.				Overall
Team	W		L	PCT	W		L	PCT
Delaware	0	–	0	–	0	–	0	–
FIU	0	–	0	–	0	–	0	–
Jacksonville State	0	–	0	–	0	–	0	–
Kennesaw State	0	–	0	–	0	–	0	–
Liberty	0	–	0	–	0	–	0	–
Middle Tennessee	0	–	0	–	0	–	0	–
Missouri State	0	–	0	–	0	–	0	–
New Mexico State	0	–	0	–	0	–	0	–
Sam Houston	0	–	0	–	0	–	0	–
Western Kentucky	0	–	0	–	0	–	0	–
† 2027 CUSA tournament winner

The 2026–27 New Mexico State Aggies women's basketball team will represent New Mexico State University during the 2026–27 NCAA Division I women's basketball season. The Aggies will be led by first year head coach Adeniyi Amadou, and will play their home games at the Pan American Center in Las Cruces, New Mexico as members of Conference USA.

== Previous season ==
The Aggies finished the 2025–26 season 9–21 overall 5–13 in C-USA play, to finish eleventh in the conference. They failed to qualify for the CUSA tournament.

On March 8, 2026, university athletic director Joe Fields announced that head coach Jody Adams had been fired after four seasons with the program, in which she posted a 57–71 record. Three days later on March 11, Rhode Island assistant coach Adeniyi Amadou was announced as the program's new head coach.

== Offseason ==
=== Departures ===
New Mexico State departures
Name	Num	Pos.	Height	Year	Hometown	Reason for departure
Imani Warren	1	Guard	5'10"	Junior	Milwaukee, WI	Transferred to UTEP
Loes Rozing	2	Guard	5'10"	Graduate Student	Heiloo, Netherlands	Graduated
Keira Hudson	3	Guard	5'5"	Freshman	Central Coast, Australia	Transferred to USC Upstate
DeAvion Wilson	4	Guard	5'5"	Freshman	Houston, TX	Transferred to Texas Southern
Morane Dossou	5	Forward	5'10"	Junior	Charleville-Mézières, France	Transferred to UT Arlington
Nikki Stanic	7	Guard	5'10"	Junior	Melbourne, Australia	Transferred to Houston Christian
Marta Guilera	16	Forward	6'1"	Junior	La Granada, Spain	Transferred to Winthrop
Iyana Beh	23	Forward	6'0"	Junior	Murray, UT	TBD; entered transfer portal
Lucía Yenes	24	Forward	6'0"	Senior	Madrid, Spain	Graduated/transferred to San Francisco
Lucia Lara	27	Forward	6'3"	Sophomore	Córdoba, Spain	Transferred to Incarnate Word
Anna Csenyi	30	Guard	5'9"	Senior	Szolnok, Hungary	Graduated
Senoj Jones	33	Forward	6'0"	Freshman	Tyler, TX	Transferred to Little Rock
Seda Gabrielyan	—	Guard	5'10"	(redshirt) Freshman	Yerevan, Armenia	Transferred to Memphis

=== Incoming transfers ===
New Mexico incoming transfers
Name	Num	Pos.	Height	Year	Hometown	Previous School
Jana Vesic	0	Guard	5'7"	Sophomore	Belgrade, Serbia	Seattle
Talia Kavoka	5	Guard	5'6"	Freshman	Paris, France	Texas A&M
Eva Agba	8	Guard-Forward	6'0"	(redshirt) Sophomore	Miramas, France	Rhode Island
Aimée Michel	14	Forward	6'3"	Sophomore	Albi, France	Rhode Island
Lilyana Fontcha	20	Center	6'4"	Sophomore	Strasbourg, France	Rhode Island
Raina Tomasicka	24	Guard	5'11"	Junior	Jekabpils, Latvia	South Florida

=== Recruiting class ===
There was no recruiting class for the class of 2026.

== Preseason ==
On October 8, 2026, Conference USA released its annual preseason coaches poll and awards. New Mexico State was picked to finish eighth in the conference.

=== Preseason rankings ===
C-USA Preseason Coaches Poll
Place	Team	Votes
1	Missouri State	90 (8)
2	Middle Tennessee	84 (1)
3	Liberty	83 (1)
4	FIU	70
5	Sam Houston	60
6	Western Kentucky	42
7	Delaware	37
8	New Mexico State	37
9	Jacksonville State	29
10	Kennesaw State	24
(#) first-place votes

=== Preseason All-CUSA Team ===
No players were named to the Preseason All-CUSA Team.

== Roster ==
2025–26 New Mexico State Aggies women's basketball team
Players
Coaches

Pos.	#	Name	Height	Year	Previous school	Hometown
G	0	Jana Vesic	5 ft 7 in (1.7 m)	So	Seattle	Belgrade, Serbia
C	1	Aissatou Keita	6 ft 1 in (1.85 m)	Fr		Paris, France
C	3	Fanta Keita	6 ft 5 in (1.96 m)	Fr	Basket Lattes Montpellier	Saint-Denis, France
G	5	Talia Kavoka	5 ft 6 in (1.68 m)	Fr	Texas A&M	Paris, France
F	6	Justine Mouyokolo	6 ft 1 in (1.85 m)	Fr		Lorient, France
G/F	8	Eva Agba	6 ft 0 in (1.83 m)	RS So	Rhode Island	Miramas, France
F	9	Imane Loubibet	6 ft 0 in (1.83 m)	Fr		Paris, France
G	10	Eva Hamlil	5 ft 8 in (1.73 m)	Fr		Ivry-sur-Seine, France
G	11	Sena Sert	5 ft 8 in (1.73 m)	Fr		Firminy, France
F	14	Aimée Michel	6 ft 3 in (1.91 m)	So	Rhode Island	Albi, France
C	20	Lilyana Fontcha	6 ft 4 in (1.93 m)	So	Rhode Island	Strasbourg, France
G	22	Emma Christiano	5 ft 3 in (1.6 m)	Sr	Las Cruces High School; New Mexico Highlands	Las Cruces, NM
G	24	Raina Tomasicka	5 ft 11 in (1.8 m)	Jr	South Florida	Jekabpils, Latvia
F	55	Julia Saillard	6 ft 2 in (1.88 m)	Fr		Montpellier, France
F	97	Stacy Chovino	5 ft 11 in (1.8 m)	Fr		Paris, France

Head coach

- Adeniyi Amadou (Syracuse)

Assistant coach(es)

- Asami Morita (Idaho State)
- Vonn Read (Clark Atlanta)
- Adeola Akomolafe (TCU)

Legend

- (C) Team captain
- (S) Suspended
- (I) Ineligible
- (W) Walk-on
- Injured
- Current redshirt

Roster
Last update: July 14, 2026

== Schedule and results ==
Date time, TV	Rank^{#}	Opponent^{#}	Result	Record	High points	High rebounds	High assists	Site (attendance) city, state
Non-conference regular season
November 2, 2026*; 6:00 p.m., ESPN+		San Diego						Pan American Center; Las Cruces, NM
November 6, 2026*; 11:00 a.m., ESPN+		Southern Utah						Pan American Center; Las Cruces, NM
November 10, 2026*; 7:00 p.m., MW+		at UTEP; Battle of I-10						Don Haskins Center; El Paso, TX
November 16, 2026*; 6:00 p.m., ESPN+		Kansas City						Pan American Center; Las Cruces, NM
November 19, 2026*; 6:00 p.m., ESPN+		at Arizona						McKale Center; Tucson, AZ
November 21, 2026*; 2:00 p.m., MW+		at New Mexico; Rio Grande Rivalry						The Pit; Albuquerque, NM
November 27, 2026*; 4:30 p.m., MW+		at Nevada; Nugget Classic						Lawlor Events Center; Reno, NV
November 29, 2026*; 11:30 a.m.		vs. UC Davis; Nugget Classic						Lawlor Events Center; Reno, NV
December 2, 2026*; 6:00 p.m., ESPN+		Saint Mary's						Pan American Center; Las Cruces, NM
December 5, 2026*; 1:00 p.m., ESPN+		UTEP; Battle of I-10						Pan American Center; Las Cruces, NM
December 14, 2026*; 7:00 p.m., ESPN+		at UC Irvine						Bren Events Center; Irvine, CA
December 17, 2026*; 7:00 p.m., ESPN+		at UC Riverside						SRC Arena; Riverside, CA
December 19, 2026*; 2:00 p.m., ESPN+		at Cal State Northridge						Premier America Credit Union Arena; Northridge, CA
C-USA regular season
January 2, 2027; 10:00 a.m., ESPN+		at FIU						Ocean Bank Convocation Center; Miami, FL
January 4, 2027; 5:30 p.m., ESPN+		at Missouri State						Great Southern Bank Arena; Springfield, MO
January 8, 2027; 6:00 p.m., ESPN+		Western Kentucky						Pan American Center; Las Cruces, NM
January 10, 2027; 12:00 p.m., ESPN+		Middle Tennessee						Pan American Center; Las Cruces, NM
January 14, 2027; 5:00 p.m., ESPN+		at Jacksonville State						Pete Mathews Coliseum; Jacksonville, AL
January 16, 2027; 10:00 a.m., ESPN+		at Kennesaw State						Convocation Center; Kennesaw, GA
January 23, 2027; TBA		at Sam Houston						Bernard Johnson Coliseum; Huntsville, TX
January 28, 2027; TBA		Delaware						Pan American Center; Las Cruces, NM
January 30, 2027; TBA		Liberty						Pan American Center; Las Cruces, NM
February 4, 2027; TBA		at Middle Tennessee						Murphy Center; Murfreesboro, TN
February 6, 2027; TBA		at Western Kentucky						E. A. Diddle Arena; Bowling Green, KY
February 11, 2027; TBA		Kennesaw State						Pan American Center; Las Cruces, NM
February 13, 2027; TBA		Jacksonville State						Pan American Center; Las Cruces, NM
February 20, 2027; TBA		Sam Houston						Pan American Center; Las Cruces, NM
February 25, 2027; TBA		at Liberty						Liberty Arena; Lynchburg, VA
February 27, 2027; TBA		at Delaware						Acierno Arena; Newark, DE
March 4, 2027; TBA		Missouri State						Pan American Center; Las Cruces, NM
March 6, 2027; TBA		FIU						Pan American Center; Las Cruces, NM
C-USA tournament
March 9–13, 2027; TBA		vs.						Propst Arena; Huntsville, AL
*Non-conference game. ^{#}Rankings from AP Poll. (#) Tournament seedings in parentheses. All times are in Central Time.
