= 2026–27 Kennesaw State Owls women's basketball team =

American college basketball season

2026–27 Kennesaw State Owls women's basketball
- Conference: Conference USA
- Record: 3–2 (0–0 C-USA)
- Head coach: Tianni Kelly (1st season)
- Associate head coach: Jon Bollier
- Assistant coaches: Michelle Holmes; Mason Samlow; Brooklyn Pannell
- Home arena: Convocation Center

2026–27 Conference USA women's basketball standings
	Conf.				Overall
Team	W		L	PCT	W		L	PCT
Missouri State	0	–	0	–	3	–	1	.750
New Mexico State	0	–	0	–	3	–	1	.750
Western Kentucky	0	–	0	–	3	–	1	.750
Liberty	0	–	0	–	2	–	1	.667
Kennesaw State	0	–	0	–	3	–	2	.600
Jacksonville State	0	–	0	–	2	–	2	.500
Middle Tennessee	0	–	0	–	2	–	2	.500
Sam Houston	0	–	0	–	2	–	2	.500
FIU	0	–	0	–	1	–	2	.333
Delaware	0	–	0	–	1	–	3	.250
† 2027 CUSA tournament winner As of November 17, 2026

The 2026–27 Kennesaw State Owls women's basketball team will represent Kennesaw State University during the 2026–27 NCAA Division I women's basketball season. The Owls, led by first-year head coach Tianni Kelly, will play their home games at the Conocation Center in Kennesaw, Georgia, as a member of Conference USA.

== Previous season ==
The Owls finished the 2025–26 season 13–17 overall and 6–12 in C-USA play, finishing in a tie for eighth in the conference with Delaware. As the No. 9 seed in the C-USA tournament, they lost in the first round to No. 9 Delaware 47–66 to end their season.

On March 11, 2026, university athletic director Milton Overton announced that head coach Octavia Blue had concluded her tenure after five seasons, and that a national search for a new head coach would begin immediately. On March 30, Overton announced that Chattanooga assistant coach Tianni Kelly had been named the program's new head coach.

== Offseason ==
=== Departures ===
Kennesaw State departures
Name	Num	Pos.	Height	Year	Hometown	Reason for departure
Kailyn Fields	0	Guard	5'6"	Junior	Atlanta, GA	Transferred to Radford
Marihya Hart	1	Guard	5'8"	Junior	Memphis, TN	Transferred to Indianapolis (D-II)
Trynce Taylor	2	Forward	6'1"	(redshirt) Sophomore	Alpharetta, GA	Transferred to James Madison
Fanta Daffe	4	Forward	5'10"	Graduate student	Paris, France	Graduated
Gabriela Bendeck-Giron	10	Guard	5'4"	Senior	Barranquilla, Colombia	Graduated
Keyarah Berry	21	Guard	5'9"	Graduate student	Rockmart, GA	Graduated
Latazia Williamson	22	Forward	6'1"	Junior	Nashville, TN	Transferred to South Dakota
TaTianna Stovall	23	Forward	6'1"	Freshman	Cleveland, TN	Transferred to Chattanooga
Mame Kane	33	Center	6'6"	Sophomore	Dakar, Senegal	Transferred to Texas Southern

=== Incoming transfers ===
Kennesaw State incoming transfers
Name	Num	Pos.	Height	Year	Hometown	Previous school
Riley Talbert	3	Guard	5'10"	Junior	Amelia Island, FL	UAB
Lamarah Cleaves	7	Forward	6'0"	Junior	Tupelo, MS	Jones (NJCAA)
Toni Warren	10	Forward	5'11"	Junior	Canton, GA	Wofford
Camryn Register	11	Guard	5'7"	Sophomore	Lawrenceville, GA	Samford (Note: Preferred walk-on.)
Arissa Jenkins	14	Guard	5'10"	Junior	Haines City, FL	Shelton State (NJCAA)
Cameron Wade	22	Guard	5'7"	Sophomore	Valdosta, GA	Augusta (D-II) (Note: Transferred as a preferred walk-on from Augusta track and field.)
Tracy Bershers	24	Forward	6'2"	Graduate student	Fort Smith, AR	Minnesota
Kayla Sullivan	25	Forward	5'11"	Senior	St. Louis, MO	Valparaiso

=== Recruiting class ===
There was no 2026 recruiting class.

== Preseason ==
On October 8, 2026, Conference USA released its annual preseason coaches poll and awards. Kennesaw State was picked to finish last in the conference.

=== Preseason rankings ===
C-USA Preseason Coaches Poll
Place	Team	Votes
1	Missouri State	90 (8)
2	Middle Tennessee	84 (1)
3	Liberty	83 (1)
4	FIU	70
5	Sam Houston	60
6	Western Kentucky	42
7	Delaware	37
8	New Mexico State	31
9	Jacksonville State	29
10	Kennesaw State	24
(#) first-place votes

=== Preseason All-CUSA Team ===
No players were named to the Preseason All-CUSA Team.

== Roster ==
Years are listed according to the new NCAA age-based eligibility model.

2026–27 Kennesaw State Owls women's basketball team
Players
Coaches

Pos.	#	Name	Height	Year	Previous school	Hometown
G	0	Madyson Elliott	5 ft 10 in (1.78 m)	So	East Nashville Magnet High School	Memphis, TN
G	2	Nyjae Malikali-El	5 ft 6 in (1.68 m)	Fr	Pikesville High School	Baltimore, MD
G	3	Riley Talbert	5 ft 10 in (1.78 m)	Jr	Bishop Kenny High School; UAB	Amelia Island, FL
F	7	Lamarah Cleaves	6 ft 0 in (1.83 m)	Jr	Tupelo High School; Jones College	Tupelo, MS
F	8	Emaya Lewis	6 ft 3 in (1.91 m)	Jr	Loganville High School; Florida Atlantic	Loganville, GA
F	10	Toni Warren	5 ft 11 in (1.8 m)	Jr	Cherokee High School; Wofford	Canton, GA
G	11	Camryn Register (W)	5 ft 7 in (1.7 m)	So	Hebron Christian Academy; Samford	Lawrenceville, GA
G	12	Kaelyn Flowers	5 ft 6 in (1.68 m)	Jr	Blackman High School; Florida Gulf Coast	Murfreesboro, TN
G	13	Shania Nichols	5 ft 7 in (1.7 m)	Sr	Como Park High School; IU Indy	Saint Paul, MN
G	14	Arissa Jenkins	5 ft 10 in (1.78 m)	Jr	Haines City High School; Shelton State CC	Haines City, FL
G	21	Uliana Kolesnyk	5 ft 11 in (1.8 m)	Fr		Munich, Germany
G	22	Cameron Wade (W)	5 ft 8 in (1.73 m)	So	Archer High School	Valdosta, GA
G	24	Tracy Bershers	6 ft 2 in (1.88 m)	GS	Northside High School; Minnesota	Fort Smith, AR
F	25	Kayla Sullivan	5 ft 11 in (1.8 m)	Sr	Lutheran High School North; Valparaiso	St. Louis, MO

Head coach

- Tianni Kelly (College of Charleston)

Assistant coach(es)

- Jon Bollier (Samford)
- Michelle Holmes (American)
- Mason Samlow (Houston)
- Brooklyn Pannell (College of Charleston)

Legend

- (C) Team captain
- (S) Suspended
- (I) Ineligible
- (W) Walk-on
- Injured
- Current redshirt

Roster
Last update: July 16, 2026

== Schedule and results ==
Date time, TV	Rank^{#}	Opponent^{#}	Result	Record	High points	High rebounds	High assists	Site (attendance) city, state
Non-conference regular season
November 2, 2026*; 11:00 a.m., ESPN+		Shorter	W 72–42	1–0	15 – Flowers	12 – Elliott	5 – Flowers	Convocation Center (776); Kennesaw, GA
November 4, 2026*; 6:00 p.m., ESPN+		Clayton State	W 75–37	2–0	15 – Elliott	8 – Nichols	6 – Talbert	Convocation Center (375); Kennesaw, GA
November 7, 2026*; 2:00 p.m., ESPN+		at Florida Atlantic	L 28–68	2–1	10 – Nichols	10 – Nichols	2 – Tied	Eleanor R. Baldwin Arena (509); Boca Raton, FL
November 11, 2026*; 6:30 p.m., SECN+		at Georgia	L 42–84	2–2	9 – Talbert	5 – Tied	3 – Flowers	Stegeman Coliseum (1,881); Athens, GA
November 15, 2026*; 2:00 p.m., ESPN+		South Alabama	W 82–77	3–2	25 – Nichols	7 – Jenkins	3 – Flowers	Convocation Center (658); Kennesaw, GA
November 21, 2026*; 1:30 p.m., ESPN+		at East Tennessee State						J. Madison Brooks Gymnasium; Johnson City, TN
November 25, 2026*; 2:00 p.m., ESPN+		Florida A&M						Convocation Center; Kennesaw, GA
November 28, 2026*; 2:00 p.m., ESPN+		Middle Georgia State						Convocation Center; Kennesaw, GA
December 2, 2026*; 5:00 p.m., ESPN+		at Charlotte						Dale F. Halton Arena; Charlotte, NC
December 6, 2026*; 3:00 p.m.		at Tennessee Tech						Eblen Center; Cookeville, TN
December 12, 2026*; 2:00 p.m., FloSports		at North Carolina A&T						Corbett Sports Center; Greensboro, NC
December 16, 2026*; 11:00 a.m., ESPN+		at USC Upstate						G. B. Hodge Center; Spartanburg, SC
December 19, 2026*; 2:00 p.m.		at Western Carolina						Ramsey Center; Cullowhee, NC
December 28, 2026*; 7:00 p.m., ACCNX		at Clemson						Littlejohn Coliseum; Clemson, SC
C-USA regular season
January 2, 2027; 3:00 p.m., ESPN+		at Western Kentucky						E. A. Diddle Arena; Bowling Green, KY
January 4, 2027; 7:30 p.m., ESPN+		at Middle Tennessee						Murphy Center; Murfreesboro, TN
January 10, 2027; 3:00 p.m., ESPN+		at Jacksonville State						Pete Mathews Coliseum; Jacksonville, AL
January 14, 2027; 6:00 p.m., ESPN+		Sam Houston						Convocation Center; Kennesaw, GA
January 16, 2027; 12:00 p.m., ESPN+		New Mexico State						Convocation Center; Kennesaw, GA
January 21, 2027; 11:00 a.m., ESPN+		at Delaware						Bob Carpenter Center; Newark, DE
January 23, 2027; 2:00 p.m., ESPN+		at Liberty						Liberty Arena; Lynchburg, VA
January 28, 2027; 6:00 p.m., ESPN+		Missouri State						Convocation Center; Kennesaw, GA
January 30, 2027; 1:00 p.m., ESPN+		FIU						Convocation Center; Kennesaw, GA
February 6, 2027; 2:00 p.m., ESPN+		Jacksonville State						Convocation Center; Kennesaw, GA
February 11, 2027; 8:00 p.m., ESPN+		at New Mexico State						Pan American Center; Las Cruces, NM
February 13, 2027; 3:00 p.m., ESPN+		at Sam Houston						Bernard Johnson Coliseum; Huntsville, TX
February 18, 2027; 6:00 p.m., ESPN+		Liberty						Convocation Center; Kennesaw, GA
February 20, 2027; 1:00 p.m., ESPN+		Delaware						Convocation Center; Kennesaw, GA
February 25, 2027; 7:30 p.m., ESPN+		at Missouri State						Great Southern Bank Arena; Springfield, MO
February 27, 2027; 1:00 p.m., ESPN+		at FIU						Ocean Bank Convocation Center; Miami, FL
March 4, 2027; 6:00 p.m., ESPN+		Middle Tennessee						Convocation Center; Kennesaw, GA
March 6, 2027; 2:00 p.m., ESPN+		Western Kentucky						Convocation Center; Kennesaw, GA
C-USA tournament
March 9–13, 2027; TBA		vs.						Propst Arena; Huntsville, AL
*Non-conference game. ^{#}Rankings from AP Poll. (#) Tournament seedings in parentheses. All times are in Eastern.
