= 2026–27 Liberty Lady Flames basketball team =

American college basketball season

2026–27 Liberty Lady Flames basketball
- Conference: Conference USA
- Record: 4–2 (0–0 C-USA)
- Head coach: Alexis Sherard (2nd season)
- Assistant coaches: Andrea "Andy" Bloodworth; Katie Mattera; Brad Palmer; Amber Lee; Emma Hess
- Home arena: Liberty Arena

2026–27 Conference USA women's basketball standings
| | Conf. | | | | Overall |
| Team | W | | L | PCT | W | | L | PCT |
|---|---|---|---|---|---|---|---|---|
| Missouri State | 0 | – | 0 | – | 4 | – | 1 | .800 |
| Western Kentucky | 0 | – | 0 | – | 3 | – | 1 | .750 |
| Jacksonville State | 0 | – | 0 | – | 3 | – | 2 | .600 |
| Liberty | 0 | – | 0 | – | 3 | – | 2 | .600 |
| Sam Houston | 0 | – | 0 | – | 3 | – | 2 | .600 |
| Kennesaw State | 0 | – | 0 | – | 3 | – | 3 | .500 |
| New Mexico State | 0 | – | 0 | – | 3 | – | 3 | .500 |
| Middle Tennessee | 0 | – | 0 | – | 2 | – | 3 | .400 |
| FIU | 0 | – | 0 | – | 1 | – | 3 | .250 |
| Delaware | 0 | – | 0 | – | 1 | – | 4 | .200 |
† 2027 CUSA tournament winner As of November 22, 2026

The 2026–27 Liberty Lady Flames basketball team will represent Liberty University during the 2026–27 NCAA Division I women's basketball season. The Lady Flames, led by second-year head coach Alexis Sherard, will play their home games at Liberty Arena in Lynchburg, Virginia and compete as a member of Conference USA.

== Previous season ==
The Lady Flames finished the 2025–26 season 18–13 overall and 11–7 in C-USA play, finishing in a four-way tie for third in the conference with Middle Tennessee, Sam Houston and Missouri State. As the No. 5 seed in the Conference USA tournament, they routed No. 4 Sam Houston in the quarterfinals 89–57, before falling to top seeded Louisiana Tech 48–61 in the semifinals to end their season.

== Offseason ==
=== Departures ===
Liberty departures
| Name | Num | Pos. | Height | Year | Hometown | Reason for departure |
|---|---|---|---|---|---|---|
| Avery Mills | 1 | Guard | 5'9" | Sophomore | Lynchburg, VA | Transferred to Tennessee |
| Caroline Shiery | 11 | Forward | 6'3" | (redshirt) Junior | Harrisburg, PA | Graduated |
| Lydie Mwamba | 22 | Guard | 5'11" | Senior | Kinshasa, Democratic Republic of the Congo | Graduated |

=== Incoming transfers ===
Liberty incoming transfers
| Name | Num | Pos. | Height | Year | Hometown | Previous school |
|---|---|---|---|---|---|---|
| Layla Scott | 10 | Guard | 5'7" | Junior | Kansas City, MO | Johnson County (NJCAA) |
| Sophia Gregory | 22 | Forward | 6'2" | Junior | Alliance, OH | Youngstown State |

=== Recruiting class ===
There was no 2026 recruiting class.

== Preseason ==
On October 8, 2026, Conference USA released its annual preseason coaches poll and awards. Liberty was picked to finish third in the conference, along with one out of ten first place votes.

=== Preseason rankings ===
C-USA Preseason Coaches Poll
| Place | Team | Votes |
|---|---|---|
| 1 | Missouri State | 90 (8) |
| 2 | Middle Tennessee | 84 (1) |
| 3 | Liberty | 83 (1) |
| 4 | FIU | 70 |
| 5 | Sam Houston | 60 |
| 6 | Western Kentucky | 42 |
| 7 | Delaware | 37 |
| 8 | New Mexico State | 31 |
| 9 | Jacksonville State | 29 |
| 10 | Kennesaw State | 24 |
(#) first-place votes

=== Preseason All-CUSA Team ===
Preseason All-CUSA Team
| Player | Year | Position |
|---|---|---|
| Sophia Gregory | Junior | Forward |
| Ify Nwaobi | Junior | Forward |
| Emmy Stout | Junior | Center |

== Roster ==
Years are listed according to new NCAA 5-in-5 eligibility regulations.

2026–27 Liberty Lady Flames women's basketball team
Players
Coaches

| Pos. | # | Name | Height | Year | Previous school | Hometown |
|---|---|---|---|---|---|---|
| G | 3 | JaKayla Thompson | 5 ft 8 in (1.73 m) | Sr | DuPont Manual High School; Boston College | Louisville, KY |
| G | 4 | Claudia Acin | 5 ft 8 in (1.73 m) | Sr | Les Alzines | Girona, Spain |
| F | 6 | Ify Nwaobi | 6 ft 2 in (1.88 m) | Jr | Edge School | Calgary, Alberta |
| G | 10 | Layla Scott | 5 ft 7 in (1.7 m) | Jr | Truman High School; Johnson County CC | Kansas City, MO |
| G | 11 | Trinity Holsinger | 5 ft 7 in (1.7 m) | Fr | Eagle Sports Academy | Eagle, ID |
| G | 12 | Peace Ashina | 6 ft 0 in (1.83 m) | Fr | South Gwinnett High School | Snellville, GA |
| G | 15 | Maleah Alexander | 5 ft 7 in (1.7 m) | Jr | Cooper High School | Burlington, KY |
| C | 17 | Emmy Stout | 6 ft 3 in (1.91 m) | Jr | Liberty Christian Academy | San Diego, CA |
| F | 21 | Elisabeth Aegisdottir | 6 ft 2 in (1.88 m) | Sr | Fjolbrautarskoli Suournesja | Grindavík, Iceland |
| F | 22 | Sophia Gregory | 6 ft 2 in (1.88 m) | Jr | West Branch High School; Youngstown State | Alliance, OH |
| G | 23 | Kendyl Smith | 5 ft 9 in (1.75 m) | Fr | Powers Catholic High School | Flint, MI |
| G | 24 | Emma Leon | 5 ft 6 in (1.68 m) | Sr | Santa Pau Pifma | Barcelona, Spain |
| G | 25 | Zeynep Avci | 6 ft 0 in (1.83 m) | So | TED Ankara College | Ankara, Turkey |
| C | 33 | Lynn Peters | 6 ft 3 in (1.91 m) | So | Caland Lyceum | Almelo, Netherlands |
| G | 35 | Amari Worsham | 6 ft 0 in (1.83 m) | Fr | William Fleming High School | Roanoke, VA |

Head coach

- Alexis Sherard (Saint Michael's)

Assistant coach(es)

- Andrea "Andy" Bloodworth (Calvin)
- Katie Mattera (Liberty)
- Brad Palmer (Cedarville)
- Amber Lee (Maryville)
- Emma Hess (Liberty)

Legend

- (C) Team captain
- (S) Suspended
- (I) Ineligible
- (W) Walk-on
- Injured
- Current redshirt

Roster
Last update: July 15, 2026

== Schedule and results ==
| Date time, TV | Rank^{#} | Opponent^{#} | Result | Record | High points | High rebounds | High assists | Site (attendance) city, state |
Non-conference regular season
| November 2, 2026*; 7:00 p.m., ESPN+ | | Frostburg State (D–II) | W 73–30 | 1–0 | 14 – Tied | 12 – Nwaobi | 3 – Gregory | Liberty Arena (1,205); Lynchburg, VA |
| November 7, 2026*; 5:00 p.m., ESPN+ | | at East Carolina | W 82–49 | 2–0 | 18 – Holsinger | 8 – Nwaobi | 4 – Acin | Williams Arena (756); Greenville, NC |
| November 11, 2026*; 7:00 p.m., ACCNX/ESPN+ | | at NC State | L 47–71 | 2–1 | 12 – Thompson | 9 – Nwaobi | 2 – Tied | Reynolds Coliseum (4,729); Raleigh, NC |
| November 17, 2026*; 7:00 p.m., FloCollege | | at North Carolina A&T | W 53–50 | 3–1 | 12 – Holsinger | 8 – Nwaobi | 3 – Holsinger | Corbett Sports Center (420); Greensboro, NC |
| November 19, 2026*; 11:00 a.m., FloCollege | | at Elon | L 56–66 | 3–2 | 14 – Acin | 12 – Nwaobi | 3 – Tied | Schar Center (2,653); Elon, NC |
| November 22, 2026*; 2:00 p.m., ESPN+ | | Lees-McRae (D–II) | W 94–43 | 4–2 | 19 – Nwaobi | 9 – Stout | 7 – Gregory | Liberty Arena; Lynchburg, VA |
| November 28, 2026*; 12:00 p.m., ESPN+ | | at Lehigh; Christmas City Classic | | | | | | Stabler Arena; Bethlehem, PA |
| November 29, 2026*; 12:00 p.m. or 2:30 p.m., LehighSports.com | | vs. Harvard or Pittsburgh; Christmas City Classic | | | | | | Stabler Arena; Bethlehem, PA |
| December 5, 2026*; 4:00 p.m., ESPN+ | | George Mason | | | | | | Liberty Arena; Lynchburg, VA |
| December 8, 2026*; 7:00 p.m., ESPN+ | | James Madison | | | | | | Liberty Arena; Lynchburg, VA |
| December 13, 2026*; 2:00 p.m., ESPN+ | | at Richmond | | | | | | Robins Center; Richmond, VA |
| December 16, 2026*; 7:00 p.m., ESPN+ | | King (D–II) | | | | | | Liberty Arena; Lynchburg, VA |
| December 20, 2026*; 2:00 p.m., ESPN+ | | vs. Washington State; Hawk Classic opening round | | | | | | Hagan Arena; Philadelphia, PA |
| December 21, 2026; 11:00 a.m. or 1:00 p.m., ESPN+ | | vs. Holy Cross or Saint Joseph's; Hawk Classic | | | | | | Hagan Arena; Philadelphia, PA |
C-USA regular season
| January 2, 2027; 2:00 p.m., ESPN+ | | at Delaware | | | | | | Acierno Arena; Newark, DE |
| January 8, 2027; 7:00 p.m., ESPN+ | | FIU | | | | | | Liberty Arena; Lynchburg, VA |
| January 10, 2027; 2:00 p.m., ESPN+ | | Missouri State | | | | | | Liberty Arena; Lynchburg, VA |
| January 14, 2027; 7:00 p.m., ESPNU | | at Middle Tennessee | | | | | | Murphy Center; Murfreesboro, TN |
| January 16, 2027; 3:00 p.m., ESPN+ | | at Western Kentucky | | | | | | E. A. Diddle Arena; Bowling Green, KY |
| January 21, 2027; 7:00 p.m., ESPN+ | | Jacksonville State | | | | | | Liberty Arena; Lynchburg, VA |
| January 23, 2027; 2:00 p.m., ESPN+ | | Kennesaw State | | | | | | Liberty Arena; Lynchburg, VA |
| January 28, 2027; 7:30 p.m., ESPN+ | | at Sam Houston | | | | | | Bernard Johnson Coliseum; Huntsville, TX |
| January 30, 2027; 3:00 p.m., ESPN+ | | at New Mexico State | | | | | | Pan American Center; Las Cruces, NM |
| February 4, 2027; 7:30 p.m., ESPN+ | | at Missouri State | | | | | | Great Southern Bank Arena; Springfield, MO |
| February 6, 2027; 1:00 p.m., ESPN+ | | at FIU | | | | | | Ocean Bank Convocation Center; Miami, FL |
| February 11, 2027; 7:00 p.m., ESPN+ | | Western Kentucky | | | | | | Liberty Arena; Lynchburg, VA |
| February 13, 2027; 2:00 p.m., ESPN+ | | Middle Tennessee | | | | | | Liberty Arena; Lynchburg, VA |
| February 18, 2027; 6:00 p.m., ESPN+ | | at Kennesaw State | | | | | | VyStar Arena; Kennesaw, GA |
| February 20, 2027; 3:00 p.m., ESPN+ | | at Jacksonville State | | | | | | Pete Mathews Coliseum; Jacksonville, AL |
| February 25, 2027; 6:00 p.m., ESPN+ | | New Mexico State | | | | | | Liberty Arena; Lynchburg, VA |
| February 27, 2027; 2:00 p.m., ESPN+ | | Sam Houston | | | | | | Liberty Arena; Lynchburg, VA |
| March 6, 2027; 2:00 p.m., ESPN+ | | Delaware | | | | | | Liberty Arena; Lynchburg, VA |
C-USA tournament
| March 9–13, 2027; TBA | | vs. | | | | | | Propst Arena; Huntsville, AL |
*Non-conference game. ^{#}Rankings from AP Poll. (#) Tournament seedings in parentheses. All times are in Eastern Time.
