= 2026–27 Delaware Fightin' Blue Hens women's basketball team =

American college basketball season

2026–27 Delaware Fightin' Blue Hens women's basketball
- Conference: Conference USA
- Record: 0–3 (0–0 C-USA)
- Head coach: Sarah Jenkins (5th season)
- Assistant coaches: Kristina Baugh; Billy Lovett; Andre Jurko; D'Nay Daniels
- Home arena: Bob Carpenter Center

2026–27 Conference USA women's basketball standings
	Conf.				Overall
Team	W		L	PCT	W		L	PCT
Missouri State	0	–	0	–	3	–	0	1.000
Jacksonville State	0	–	0	–	2	–	1	.667
Liberty	0	–	0	–	2	–	1	.667
New Mexico State	0	–	0	–	2	–	1	.667
Sam Houston	0	–	0	–	2	–	1	.667
Western Kentucky	0	–	0	–	2	–	1	.667
FIU	0	–	0	–	1	–	1	.500
Kennesaw State	0	–	0	–	2	–	2	.500
Middle Tennessee	0	–	0	–	1	–	1	.500
Delaware	0	–	0	–	0	–	3	.000
† 2027 CUSA tournament winner As of November 13, 2026

The 2026–27 Delaware Fightin' Blue Hens women's basketball team currently represents the University of Delaware during the 2026–27 NCAA Division I women's basketball season. The Fightin' Blue Hens, led by fifth-year head coach Sarah Jenkins, play their home games at the Acierno Arena in the Bob Carpenter Center in Newark, Delaware, and compete as a member of Conference USA.

== Previous season ==
In their first season as a member of Conference USA, the Fightin' Blue Hens finished the 2025–26 season 13–19 overall and 6–12 in C-USA play, finishing eighth in the conference. As the No. 8 seed in the C-USA tournament, they defeated No. 9 Kennesaw State 66–47 in the first round, before falling 43–72 to top-seeded Louisiana Tech in the quarterfinals to end their season.

== Offseason ==
=== Departures ===
Delaware departures
Name	Num	Pos.	Height	Year	Hometown	Reason for departure
Lay Fantroy	0	Guard	5'10"	Junior	Palestine, TX	Transferred to Texas State
Kailah Correa	1	Guard	5'4"	Freshman	Lebanon, PA	Transferred to Monmouth
Ella Wanzer	3	Guard	5'10"	Graduate student	Buffalo, NY	Graduated
Trinity Vance	4	Guard	5'10"	Sophomore	Waterloo, SC	Transferred to Old Dominion
Jiya Perry	12	Guard	5'11"	Senior	DeSoto, TX	Graduated
Amiya Carroll	14	Guard	5'10"	Senior	Smyrna, DE	Graduated
Claudia Clement	20	Forward	6'3"	Junior	Barcelona, Spain	Transferred to Marist
Ande'a Cherisier	21	Center	6'1"	Junior	Baltimore, MD	Transferred to Pittsburgh
Arantxa Portalez	22	Forward	6'2"	Junior	Zaragoza, Spain	Transferred to Vermont
Grace Sundback	23	Guard	5'9"	Junior	Staten Island, NY	Transferred to Siena

=== Incoming transfers ===
Delaware incoming transfers
Name	Num	Pos.	Height	Year	Hometown	Previous school
Kennise Johnson	0	Guard	5'5"	Senior	Joliet, IL	Iowa
Regina Donanu	2	Guard	5'5"	5th year	Bayelsa, Nigeria	Barton CC (NJCAA)
Saniyah Littlejohn	3	Guard	5'7"	Sophomore	Philadelphia, PA	George Mason
Frances Ulysse	13	Forward	6'1"	5th year	Montreal, QC	Longwood
Daniella Matus	20	Guard	5'9"	Sophomore	Fairfield, NJ	Loyola Chicago
Jordyn Coleman	23	Forward	6'2"	Junior	Zionsville, IN	Abilene Christian

=== Recruiting class ===
There was no 2026 recruiting class.

== Preseason ==
On October 8, 2026, Conference USA released its annual preseason coaches poll and awards. Western Kentucky was picked to finish sixth in the conference.

=== Preseason rankings ===
C-USA Preseason Coaches Poll
Place	Team	Votes
1	Missouri State	90 (8)
2	Middle Tennessee	84 (1)
3	Liberty	83 (1)
4	FIU	70
5	Sam Houston	60
6	Western Kentucky	42
7	Delaware	37
8	New Mexico State	31
9	Jacksonville State	29
10	Kennesaw State	24
(#) first-place votes

=== Preseason All-CUSA Team ===
No players were named to the Preseason All-CUSA Team.

== Roster ==
Years are listed according to the new NCAA age-based eligibility model.

2026–27 Delaware Fightin' Blue Hens women's basketball team
Players
Coaches

Pos.	#	Name	Height	Year	Previous school	Hometown
G	0	Kennise Johnson	5 ft 5 in (1.65 m)	Sr	Example Academy; Iowa	Joliet, IL
G	1	Safi Kolliegbo	5 ft 9 in (1.75 m)	Sr	Life Center Academy; Niagara	Willingboro, NJ
G	2	Regina Donanu (5th)	5 ft 5 in (1.65 m)	Sr	Command Secondary School Ebedebiri; Barton Community College	Bayelsa, Nigeria
G	3	Saniyah Littlejohn	5 ft 7 in (1.7 m)	So	Lansdale Catholic High School; George Mason	Philadelphia, PA
G	4	London Caldwell	5 ft 7 in (1.7 m)	Fr	West Orange High School	East Orange, NJ
F	5	Amelia Fruchtman	6 ft 0 in (1.83 m)	Fr	Cape Henlopen High School	Lewes, DE
G	10	Elle Stone	5 ft 11 in (1.8 m)	So	Mallard Creek High School	Charlotte, NC
F	13	Frances Ulysse (5th)	6 ft 1 in (1.85 m)	Sr	Longwood	Montreal, QC
F	15	Ava Andrews	6 ft 1 in (1.85 m)	So	North Paulding High School	Dallas, GA
F	16	Ema Rychtecka	5 ft 9 in (1.75 m)	Fr	Sports Gymnasium of Ludvig Danek	Brno, Czech Republic
G	20	Daniella Manus	5 ft 9 in (1.75 m)	So	Morris Catholic High School; Loyola Chicago	Fairfield, NJ
G	22	Kendall Scott	5 ft 7 in (1.7 m)	Jr	Chancellor High School; Gardner–Webb	Fredericksburg, VA
F	23	Jordyn Coleman	6 ft 2 in (1.88 m)	Sr	Zionsville Community High School; Abilene Christian	Zionsville, IN
F	26	Milena Bigovic	6 ft 0 in (1.83 m)	Sr	Gymnasium Slobodan Škerovic	Cetinje, Montenegro
C	55	Gianna Johnson	6 ft 5 in (1.96 m)	Jr	George School	Levittown, PA

Head coach

- Sarah Jenkins (Georgetown)

Assistant coach(es)

- Kristina Baugh (Providence)
- Billy Lovett (Fordham)
- Andre Jurko (Florida)
- D'Nay Daniels (Memphis)

Legend

- (C) Team captain
- (S) Suspended
- (I) Ineligible
- (W) Walk-on
- (5th) Fifth year senior
- Injured
- Current redshirt

Roster
Last update: July 15, 2026

== Schedule and results ==
Date time, TV	Rank^{#}	Opponent^{#}	Result	Record	High points	High rebounds	High assists	Site (attendance) city, state
Non-conference regular season
November 4, 2026*; 6:00 p.m., ACCNX		at Virginia Tech	L 53–101	0–1	18 – Ulysse	5 – Ulysse	2 – Caldwell	Cassell Coliseum (4,592); Blacksburg, VA
November 9, 2026*; 4:00 p.m., FloCollege		at Towson	L 55–57	0–2	17 – Andrews	9 – Coleman	3 – Coleman	SECU Arena (410); Towson, MD
November 11, 2026*; 7:30 p.m., B1G+		at Wisconsin	L 48–90	0–3	14 – Kolliegbo	5 – Andrews	4 – Tied	Kohl Center (2,435); Madison, WI
November 15, 2026*; 4:00 p.m., ESPN+		American						Bob Carpenter Center; Newark, DE
November 19, 2026*; 7:00 p.m., ESPN+		Richmond						Bob Carpenter Center; Newark, DE
November 22, 2026*; 2:00 p.m., ESPN+		Hampton						Bob Carpenter Center; Newark, DE
November 27, 2026*; 3:00 p.m.		at California; Raising the B.A.R. Invitational semifinals						Haas Pavilion; Berkeley, CA
November 28, 2026*; TBA		vs. Gardner–Webb or East Carolina; Raising the B.A.R. Invitational						Haas Pavilion; Berkeley, CA
December 3, 2026*; 7:00 p.m., ESPN+		Loyola (MD)						Bob Carpenter Center; Newark, DE
December 17, 2026*; 11:00 a.m., FloCollege		at Stony Brook						Stony Brook Arena; Stony Brook, NY
December 21, 2026*; 2:00 p.m., ESPN+		at Bucknell						Sojka Pavilion; Lewisburg, PA
December 30, 2026*; 2:00 p.m., ESPN+		Saint Francis (PA)						Bob Carpenter Center; Newark, DE
C-USA regular season
January 2, 2027; 2:00 p.m., ESPN+		Liberty						Bob Carpenter Center; Newark, DE
January 8, 2027; 7:00 p.m., ESPN+		Missouri State						Bob Carpenter Center; Newark, DE
January 10, 2027; 1:00 p.m., ESPN+		FIU						Bob Carpenter Center; Newark, DE
January 14, 2027; 7:30 p.m., ESPN+		at Western Kentucky						E. A. Diddle Arena; Bowling Green, KY
January 16, 2027; 7:00 p.m., ESPN+		at Middle Tennessee						Murphy Center; Murfreesboro, TN
January 21, 2027; 11:00 a.m., ESPN+		Kennesaw State						Bob Carpenter Center; Newark, DE
January 23, 2027; 1:00 p.m., ESPN+		Jacksonville State						Bob Carpenter Center; Newark, DE
January 28, 2027; 8:00 p.m., ESPN+		at New Mexico State						Pan American Center; Las Cruces, NM
January 30, 2027; 2:00 p.m., ESPN+		at Sam Houston						Bernard Johnson Coliseum; Huntsville, TX
February 4, 2027; 7:00 p.m., ESPN+		at FIU						Ocean Bank Convocation Center; Miami, FL
February 6, 2027; 2:00 p.m., ESPN+		at Missouri State						Great Southern Bank Arena; Springfield, MO
February 11, 2027; 7:00 p.m., ESPN+		Middle Tennessee						Bob Carpenter Center; Newark, DE
February 13, 2027; 2:00 p.m., ESPN+		Western Kentucky						Bob Carpenter Center; Newark, DE
February 18, 2027; 8:00 p.m., ESPN+		at Jacksonville State						Pete Mathews Coliseum; Jacksonville, AL
February 20, 2027; 1:00 p.m., ESPN+		at Kennesaw State						Convocation Center; Kennesaw, GA
February 25, 2027; 7:00 p.m., ESPN+		Sam Houston						Bob Carpenter Center; Newark, DE
February 27, 2027; 12:00 p.m., ESPN+		New Mexico State						Bob Carpenter Center; Newark, DE
March 6, 2027; 2:00 p.m., ESPN+		at Liberty						Liberty Arena; Lynchburg, VA
C-USA tournament
March 9–13, 2027; TBA		vs.						Propst Arena; Huntsville, AL
*Non-conference game. ^{#}Rankings from AP Poll. (#) Tournament seedings in parentheses. All times are in Eastern.
