= 2026–27 Sam Houston Bearkats women's basketball team =

American college basketball season

2026–27 Sam Houston Bearkats women's basketball
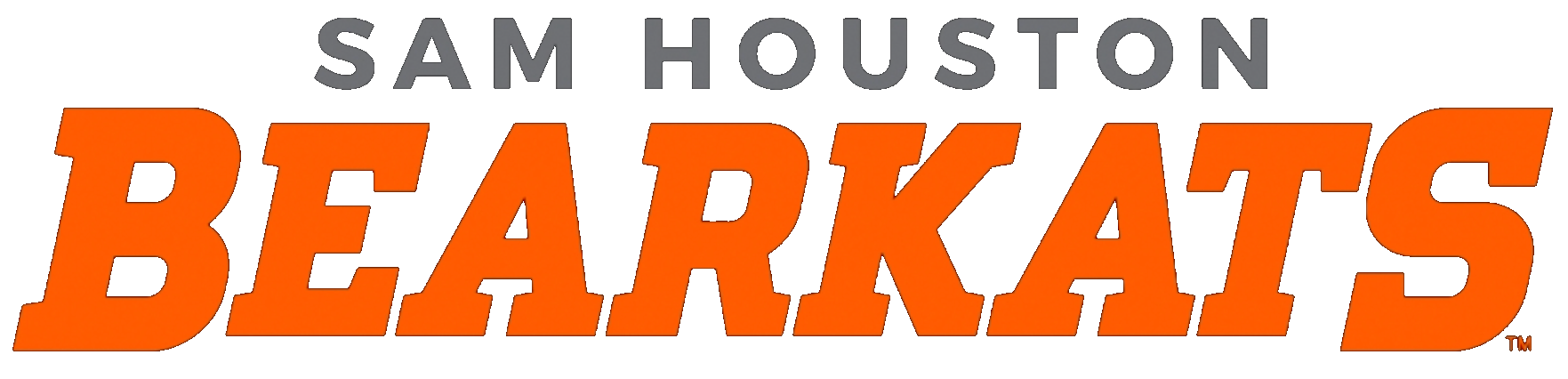
- Conference: Conference USA
- Record: 0–0 (0–0 C-USA)
- Head coach: Ravon Justice (8th season)
- Assistant coaches: Brittany Mason; Ayriell Robinson
- Home arena: Bernard Johnson Coliseum

2026–27 Conference USA women's basketball standings
	Conf.				Overall
Team	W		L	PCT	W		L	PCT
Delaware	0	–	0	–	0	–	0	–
FIU	0	–	0	–	0	–	0	–
Jacksonville State	0	–	0	–	0	–	0	–
Kennesaw State	0	–	0	–	0	–	0	–
Liberty	0	–	0	–	0	–	0	–
Middle Tennessee	0	–	0	–	0	–	0	–
Missouri State	0	–	0	–	0	–	0	–
New Mexico State	0	–	0	–	0	–	0	–
Sam Houston	0	–	0	–	0	–	0	–
Western Kentucky	0	–	0	–	0	–	0	–
† 2027 CUSA tournament winner

The 2026–27 Sam Houston Bearkats women's basketball team will represent Sam Houston State University during the 2026–27 NCAA Division I women's basketball season. The Bearkats will be led by eighth-year head coach Ravon Justice, and will play their home games at the Bernard Johnson Coliseum in Huntsville, Texas as third-year members of Conference USA.

== Previous season ==
The Bearkats finished the 2025–26 season 18–13 overall and 11–7 in C-USA play, finishing in a four-way tie for third in the conference with Middle Tennessee, Liberty and Missouri State. As the No. 4 seed in the C-USA tournament, they were routed in the quarterfinals 57–89 by No. 5 Liberty.

Following their tournament elimination, the Bearkats later earned and accepted an at-large bid to the WNIT, making it their second overall appearance since they first competed in 2013. They lost 59–62 in Round 1 to Portland to end their season.

== Offseason ==
=== Departures ===
Sam Houston departures
Name	Num	Pos.	Height	Year	Hometown	Reason for departure
Kaylie Carr	1	Guard	5'10"	Freshman	Oxford, MS	Transferred to Prairie View A&M
Kelis Grant	3	Guard	5'7"	Junior	Cedar Hill, TX	Transferred to Jacksonville
Fanta Kone	4	Guard	5'7"	Senior	Bamako, Mali	Graduated
Aysia Ward-Strong	5	Guard	5'10"	Graduate student	Dallas, TX	Graduated
Annika Corcoran	7	Guard	5'5"	Graduate student	Chardon, OH	Transferred to Cleveland State
Alaisha Brown	10	Guard-Forward	5'10"	Junior	Arlington, TX	Transferred to LSU–Shreveport (NAIA)
Nyla Inmon	15	Forward	6'0"	Senior	Tyler, TX	Graduated
Blessing Okoh	21	Forward	6'0	Graduate student	Houston, TX	Graduated
Bryana Block	23	Guard	5'6"	(redshirt) Junior	Texarkana, TX	Transferred to Mississippi Valley State
Whitney Dunn	24	Guard	5'9"	Senior	Chicago, IL	Graduated
Lea Salinas Beamen	25	Center	6'4"	Senior	Brentwood, CA	Graduated

=== Incoming transfers ===
Sam Houston incoming transfers
Name	Num	Pos.	Height	Year	Hometown	Previous school
Taylor Spencer	0	Guard	5'7"	Junior	Cleveland, TX	Blinn (NJCAA)
Mar'Cyah Willis	1	Guard	5'7"	Junior	Waco, TX	Tarleton State
Ruke Ogbevire	3	Guard	5'7"	Sophomore	Houston, TX	Penn
Hannah Wallace	5	Guard	6'1"	Junior	Saint Louis, MO	Saint Louis
Kylah McCullers	6	Guard	5'7"	Senior	Madison, WI	Mississippi Valley State
Leanna Pabst	7	Guard	5'7"	Junior	Ocala, FL	Tallahassee State (NJCAA)
Maci Quiller	10	Guard/Forward	5'11"	Senior	Pflugerville, TX	Texas Southern
Alani Owens	21	Guard	5'8"	Junior	Conroe, TX	Montevallo (D-II)
Laila Harrison	30	Guard/Forward	6'1"	Junior	Cincinnati, OH	Bowling Green
Lanaijha Johnson	32	Forward	6'0"	Junior	Center, TX	McLennan (NJCAA)

=== Recruiting class ===
There was no 2026 recruiting class.

== Preseason ==
On October 8, 2026, Conference USA released its annual preseason coaches poll and awards. Sam Houston was picked to finish fifth in the conference.

=== Preseason rankings ===
C-USA Preseason Coaches Poll
Place	Team	Votes
1	Missouri State	90 (8)
2	Middle Tennessee	84 (1)
3	Liberty	83 (1)
4	FIU	70
5	Sam Houston	60
6	Western Kentucky	42
7	Delaware	37
8	New Mexico State	31
9	Jacksonville State	29
10	Kennesaw State	24
(#) first-place votes

=== Preseason All-CUSA Team ===
Preseason All-CUSA Team
Player	Year	Position
Deborah Ogayemi	Graduate Student	Forward

== Roster ==
Years are listed according to the new NCAA age-based eligibility model.

2026–27 Sam Houston Bearkats women's basketball team
Players
Coaches

Pos.	#	Name	Height	Year	Previous school	Hometown
G	0	Taylor Spencer	5 ft 7 in (1.7 m)	Jr	Cleveland High School; Blinn College	Cleveland, TX
G	1	Mar'Cyah Willis	5 ft 7 in (1.7 m)	Jr	La Vega High School; Tarleton State	Waco, TX
G	2	Tianna Mathis (5th)	5 ft 8 in (1.73 m)	Sr	Rudder High School; Texas Southern	Bryan, TX
G	3	Ruke Ogbevire	5 ft 7 in (1.7 m)	So	Fulshear High School; Penn	Houston, TX
G	5	Hannah Wallace	6 ft 1 in (1.85 m)	Jr	Cardinal Ritter College Prep; Saint Louis	St. Louis, MO
G	6	Kylah McCullens	5 ft 7 in (1.7 m)	Sr	Madison East High School; Mississippi Valley State	Madison, WI
G	7	Leanna Pabst	5 ft 7 in (1.7 m)	Jr	West Port High School; Tallahassee State College	Ocala, FL
F	8	Deborah Ogayemi	6 ft 0 in (1.83 m)	GS	Presentation Secondary School; UT Rio Grande Valley	Waterford, Ireland
G/F	10	Maci Quiller	5 ft 11 in (1.8 m)	Sr	Hendrickson High School; Texas Southern	Pflugerville, TX
G	11	Esther Rodellar	5 ft 10 in (1.78 m)	Sr	Institut Can Mas; Siena	Barcelona, Spain
F	12	Amyah Hall	6 ft 3 in (1.91 m)	Fr	Summer Creek High School	Houston, TX
G	21	Alani Owens	5 ft 8 in (1.73 m)	Jr	Conroe High School; Montevallo	Conroe, TX
G/F	30	Laila Harrison	6 ft 1 in (1.85 m)	Jr	Mount Notre Dame High School; Bowling Green	Cincinnati, OH
F	32	Lanaijha Johnson	6 ft 0 in (1.83 m)	Jr	Center High Schoola; McLennan Community College	Center, TX

Head coach

- Ravon Justice (USAO)

Assistant coach(es)

- Brittany Mason (Houston)
- Ayriell Robinson (Saint Louis)

Legend

- (C) Team captain
- (S) Suspended
- (I) Ineligible
- (W) Walk-on
- (5th) Fifth year senior
- Injured
- Current redshirt

Roster
Last update: July 13, 2026

== Schedule and results ==
Date time, TV	Rank^{#}	Opponent^{#}	Result	Record	High points	High rebounds	High assists	Site (attendance) city, state
Non-conference regular season
November 2, 2026*; 6:30 p.m.		McMurry						Bernard Johnson Coliseum; Huntsville, TX
November 5, 2026*; 7:00 p.m.		at Houston						Fertitta Center; Houston, TX
November 10, 2026*; 6:30 p.m.		Jarvis Christian						Bernard Johnson Coliseum; Huntsville, TX
November 14, 2026*; 7:00 p.m.		at Northern Colorado						Bank of Colorado Arena; Greeley, CO
November 19, 2026*; 6:30 p.m.		at Louisiana–Monroe						b1Bank Fant Coliseum; Monroe, LA
November 24, 2026*; 2:00 p.m.		Pepperdine						Bernard Johnson Coliseum; Huntsville, TX
November 30, 2026*; 6:30 p.m.		UT Rio Grande Valley						Bernard Johnson Coliseum; Huntsville, TX
December 6, 2026*; 5:00 p.m., SECN		at Mississippi State						Humphrey Coliseum; Starkville, MS
December 17, 2026*; 2:00 p.m., SECN+/ESPN+		at Texas A&M						Reed Arena; College Station, TX
December 20, 2026*; 12:00 p.m.		Wichita State						Bernard Johnson Coliseum; Huntsville, TX
December 29, 2026*; 2:00 p.m.		UNT Dallas						Bernard Johnson Coliseum; Huntsville, TX
C-USA regular season
January 2, 2027; TBA		at Missouri State						Great Southern Bank Arena; Springfield, MO
January 4, 2027; TBA		at FIU						Ocean Bank Convocation Center; Miami, FL
January 8, 2027; TBA		Middle Tennessee						Bernard Johnson Coliseum; Huntsville, TX
January 10, 2027; TBA		Western Kentucky						Bernard Johnson Coliseum; Huntsville, TX
January 14, 2027; TBA		at Kennesaw State						VyStar Arena; Kennesaw, GA
January 16, 2027; TBA		at Jacksonville State						Pete Mathews Coliseum; Jacksonville, AL
January 23, 2027; TBA		New Mexico State						Bernard Johnson Coliseum; Huntsville, TX
January 28, 2027; TBA		Liberty						Bernard Johnson Coliseum; Huntsville, TX
January 30, 2027; TBA		Delaware						Bernard Johnson Coliseum; Huntsville, TX
February 4, 2027; TBA		at Western Kentucky						E. A. Diddle Arena; Bowling Green, KY
February 6, 2027; TBA		at Middle Tennessee						Murphy Center; Murfreesboro, TN
February 11, 2027; TBA		Jacksonville State						Bernard Johnson Coliseum; Huntsville, TX
February 13, 2027; TBA		Kennesaw State						Bernard Johnson Coliseum; Huntsville, TX
February 20, 2027; TBA		at New Mexico State						Pan American Center; Las Cruces, NM
February 25, 2027; TBA		at Delaware						Acierno Arena; Newark, DE
February 27, 2027; TBA		at Delaware						Liberty Arena; Lynchburg, VA
March 4, 2027; TBA		FIU						Bernard Johnson Coliseum; Huntsville, TX
March 6, 2027; TBA		Missouri State						Bernard Johnson Coliseum; Huntsville, TX
C-USA tournament
March 9–13, 2027; TBA		vs.						Propst Arena; Huntsville, AL
*Non-conference game. ^{#}Rankings from AP Poll. (#) Tournament seedings in parentheses. All times are in Central Time.
