= Monmouth Academy =

Monmouth Academy may refer to:

- Monmouth Academy (Illinois), a former name of Monmouth College
- Monmouth Academy (Maine)
- Monmouth Academy (New Jersey)
