= 2026–27 Missouri State Lady Bears basketball team =

American college basketball season

2026–27 Missouri State Lady Bears basketball
- Conference: Conference USA
- Record: 4–1 (0–0 C-USA)
- Head coach: Beth Cunningham (5th season)
- Assistant coaches: Olivia Malcolm; Jay Spoonhour; LaKale Malone; Abby Emmert; Blake Richter
- Home arena: Great Southern Bank Arena

2026–27 Conference USA women's basketball standings
| | Conf. | | | | Overall |
| Team | W | | L | PCT | W | | L | PCT |
|---|---|---|---|---|---|---|---|---|
| Missouri State | 0 | – | 0 | – | 4 | – | 1 | .800 |
| Liberty | 0 | – | 0 | – | 3 | – | 1 | .750 |
| New Mexico State | 0 | – | 0 | – | 3 | – | 1 | .750 |
| Western Kentucky | 0 | – | 0 | – | 3 | – | 1 | .750 |
| Kennesaw State | 0 | – | 0 | – | 3 | – | 2 | .600 |
| Jacksonville State | 0 | – | 0 | – | 2 | – | 2 | .500 |
| Middle Tennessee | 0 | – | 0 | – | 2 | – | 2 | .500 |
| Sam Houston | 0 | – | 0 | – | 2 | – | 2 | .500 |
| FIU | 0 | – | 0 | – | 1 | – | 2 | .333 |
| Delaware | 0 | – | 0 | – | 1 | – | 3 | .250 |
† 2027 CUSA tournament winner As of November 19, 2026

The 2026–27 Missouri State Lady Bears basketball team will represent Missouri State University during the 2026–27 NCAA Division I women's basketball season. The Lady Bears, led by fifth-year head coach Beth Cunningham, will play their home games at the Great Southern Bank Arena in Springfield, Missouri, and will compete as a second-year member of Conference USA.

== Previous season ==
The Lady Bears finished the 2025–26 season 23–13 overall and 11–7 in C-USA play, finishing sixth in the conference. In the C-USA tournament, they defeated No. 3 Middle Tennessee 69–66 in the quarterfinals, upset No. 2 FIU in a 74–69 win in the semifinals, before defeating top-seeded Louisiana Tech 43–38 in the championship game to capture the conference title in their first season as members of Conference USA, as well as an automatic bid to the NCAA tournament.

They became the lowest seed to ever win the tournament title, tied with Tulsa, who won in 2013 also as a No. 6 seed.

In the NCAA tournament, the Lady Bears were seeded No. 16 in the Fort Worth #3 Regional, and placed into the First Four. They defeated other No. 16 seed Stephen F. Austin 85–75 to advance to the field of 64. They lost 45–87 to top-seeded Texas in the first round to end their season.

== Offseason ==
=== Departures ===
Missouri State departures
| Name | Num | Pos. | Height | Year | Hometown | Reason for departure |
|---|---|---|---|---|---|---|
| Victoria Dixon | 0 | Guard | 5'5" | Senior | Grand Prairie, TX | Graduated |
| Zoe Canfield | 5 | Guard | 5'11" | Sophomore | Topeka, KS | Transferred to Oklahoma State |
| Faith Lee | 11 | Forward | 5'11" | Senior | Monroe, LA | Graduated |
| Tyra Robinson | 12 | Forward | 6'3" | Junior | Little Rock, AR | Transferred to SIU Edwardsville |
| Maycee James | 13 | Guard | 5'7" | Senior | Goddard, KS | Graduated |
| Angel Scott | 20 | Guard | 5'10" | Senior | Edmond, OK | Graduated |
| Cady Pauley | 32 | Guard | 5'11" | Senior | Milan, MO | Graduated |

=== Incoming transfers ===
Missouri State incoming transfers
| Name | Num | Pos. | Height | Year | Hometown | Previous school |
|---|---|---|---|---|---|---|
| Landon Forbes | 5 | Guard | 5'6" | Senior | Wichita, KS | Morehead State |
| Macie Mays | 13 | Guard | 5'11" | Senior | El Dorado Springs, MO | Pittsburg State (D-II) |
| Hannah Linthacum | 34 | Forward | 6'4" | Senior | Jefferson City, MO | Missouri |

=== Recruiting class ===
There was no recruiting class for 2026.

== Preseason ==
On October 8, 2026, Conference USA released its annual preseason coaches poll and awards. Missouri State was picked to finish first in the conference, along with eight out of ten first place votes.

=== Preseason rankings ===
C-USA Preseason Coaches Poll
| Place | Team | Votes |
|---|---|---|
| 1 | Missouri State | 90 (8) |
| 2 | Middle Tennessee | 84 (1) |
| 3 | Liberty | 83 (1) |
| 4 | FIU | 70 |
| 5 | Sam Houston | 60 |
| 6 | Western Kentucky | 42 |
| 7 | Delaware | 37 |
| 8 | New Mexico State | 31 |
| 9 | Jacksonville State | 29 |
| 10 | Kennesaw State | 24 |
(#) first-place votes

=== Preseason All-CUSA Team ===
Preseason All-CUSA Team
| Player | Year | Position |
|---|---|---|
| Kaemyn Bekemeier | Senior | Guard |
| Lainie Douglas | Junior | Forward |
| Maiesha Washington | Sophomore | Forward |

=== Other awards ===
Other awards
| Player | Year | Position | Award won |
|---|---|---|---|
| Kaemyn Bekemeier | Senior | Guard | Preseason Player of the Year |

== Roster ==
Years are listed according to the new NCAA age-based eligibility model.

2026–27 Missouri State Lady Bears women's basketball team
Players
Coaches

| Pos. | # | Name | Height | Year | Previous school | Hometown |
|---|---|---|---|---|---|---|
| G | 0 | Antil Snoddy | 5 ft 6 in (1.68 m) | Fr | Lee's Summit West High School | Kansas City, MO |
| G | 1 | JaNyla Bush | 5 ft 3 in (1.6 m) | Jr | Link Academy | St. Louis, MO |
| F | 2 | Lainie Douglas | 6 ft 3 in (1.91 m) | Jr | Blue Valley Northwest High School | Overland Park, KS |
| G | 3 | Kendal Brueggen | 5 ft 10 in (1.78 m) | So | Hesston High School | Hesston, KS |
| G | 4 | Chloe Howe | 6 ft 1 in (1.85 m) | Fr | Canton High School | Canton, TX |
| G | 5 | Landon Forbes | 5 ft 6 in (1.68 m) | Sr | Bishop Carroll High School; Morehead State | Wichita, KS |
| G | 8 | Zha Harris | 5 ft 6 in (1.68 m) | Fr | Lift for Life Academy | St. Louis, MO |
| G | 13 | Macie Mays | 5 ft 11 in (1.8 m) | Sr | El Dorado Springs High School; Pittsburg State | El Dorado Springs, MO |
| F | 15 | Maiesha Washington | 6 ft 0 in (1.83 m) | So | Legion Prep Academy | Fayetteville, AR |
| F | 21 | Neveah Lucious | 6 ft 3 in (1.91 m) | Fr | Incarnate Word Academy | St. Louis, MO |
| G | 24 | Kaemyn Bekemeier | 5 ft 9 in (1.75 m) | Sr | Republic High School | Republic, MO |
| G | 31 | Audrey Hopkins | 5 ft 11 in (1.8 m) | So | Lincoln Christian School | Tulsa, OK |
| F | 33 | Blake O'Grady | 6 ft 0 in (1.83 m) | Sr | Dexter Southfield School | Brookline, MA |
| F | 34 | Hannah Linthacum | 6 ft 4 in (1.93 m) | Sr | Jefferson City High School; Missouri | Jefferson City, MO |

Head coach

- Beth Cunningham (Notre Dame)

Assistant coach(es)

- Olivia Malcolm (Dayton)
- Jay Spoonhour (Pittsburg State)
- LaKale Malone (Nebraska)
- Abby Emmert (Missouri State)
- Blake Richter (Kansas State)

Legend

- (C) Team captain
- (S) Suspended
- (I) Ineligible
- (W) Walk-on
- Injured
- Current redshirt

Roster
Last update: July 13, 2026

== Schedule and results ==
| Date time, TV | Rank^{#} | Opponent^{#} | Result | Record | High points | High rebounds | High assists | Site (attendance) city, state |
Exhibition
| October 28, 2026*; 6:30 p.m. | | Missouri Southern | W 87–27 | | – | – | – | Great Southern Bank Arena; Springfield, MO |
Non-conference regular season
| November 2, 2026*; 6:30 p.m., ESPN+ | | Southeast Missouri State | W 77–40 | 1–0 | 15 – Douglas | 7 – Tied | 3 – Brueggen | Great Southern Bank Arena (2,227); Springfield, MO |
| November 7, 2026*; 8:00 p.m., MW+ | | at Wyoming | W 72–37 | 2–0 | 15 – Tied | 7 – Lucious | 6 – Forbes | Arena-Auditorium (1,879); Laramie, WY |
| November 10, 2026*; 11:00 a.m., ESPN+ | | at Wichita State | W 76–48 | 3–0 | – | – | – | Charles Koch Arena; Wichita, KS |
| November 13, 2026*; 6:30 p.m., ESPN+ | | Marquette | L 58–70 | 3–1 | – | – | – | Great Southern Bank Arena; Springfield, MO |
| November 18, 2026*; 7:00 p.m., ESPN+ | | at Saint Louis | W 67–57 | 4–1 | – | – | – | Chaifetz Arena; St. Louis, MO |
| November 22, 2026*; 11:00 a.m. | | vs. Kansas City; 28.5 Hoops Women's Invitational | | | | | | T-Mobile Center; Kansas City, MO |
| November 26, 2026*; 5:30 p.m. | | vs. Minnesota; Cancún Challenge Riviera Tournament | | | | | | Hard Rock Hotel Riviera Maya; Cancún, Mexico |
| November 27, 2026*; 3:00 p.m. | | vs. Washington State; Cancun Challenge Riviera Tournament | | | | | | Hard Rock Hotel Riviera Maya; Cancún, Mexico |
| December 3, 2026*; 6:30 p.m. | | at Kansas | | | | | | Allen Fieldhouse; Lawrence, KS |
| December 6, 2026*; 2:00 p.m., ESPN+ | | Central Arkansas | | | | | | Great Southern Bank Arena; Springfield, MO |
| December 12, 2026*; 1:00 p.m., ESPN+ | | North Dakota State | | | | | | Great Southern Bank Arena; Springfield, MO |
| December 16, 2026*; 6:30 p.m., ESPN+ | | UT Arlington | | | | | | Great Southern Bank Arena; Springfield, MO |
| December 19, 2026*; 2:00 p.m. | | at Arkansas | | | | | | Bud Walton Arena; Fayetteville, AR |
| December 22, 2026*; 1:00 p.m., ESPN+ | | Austin Peay | | | | | | Great Southern Bank Arena; Springfield, MO |
C-USA regular season
| January 2, 2027; 1:00 p.m., ESPN+ | | Sam Houston | | | | | | Great Southern Bank Arena; Springfield, MO |
| January 4, 2027; 6:30 p.m., ESPN+ | | New Mexico State | | | | | | Great Southern Bank Arena; Springfield, MO |
| January 8, 2027*; 6:00 p.m., ESPN+ | | at Delaware | | | | | | Acierno Arena; Newark, DE |
| January 10, 2027*; 1:00 p.m., ESPN+ | | at Liberty | | | | | | Liberty Arena; Lynchburg, VA |
| January 16, 2027; 11:00 a.m., ESPN+ | | FIU | | | | | | Great Southern Bank Arena; Springfield, MO |
| January 21, 2027; 6:30 p.m., ESPN+ | | Western Kentucky | | | | | | Great Southern Bank Arena; Springfield, MO |
| January 23, 2027; 1:00 p.m., ESPN+ | | Middle Tennessee | | | | | | Great Southern Bank Arena; Springfield, MO |
| January 28, 2027; 5:00 p.m., ESPN+ | | at Kennesaw State | | | | | | VyStar Arena; Kennesaw, GA |
| January 30, 2027; 11:00 a.m., ESPN+ | | at Jacksonville State | | | | | | Pete Mathews Coliseum; Jacksonville, AL |
| February 4, 2027; 6:30 p.m., ESPN+ | | Liberty | | | | | | Great Southern Bank Arena; Springfield, MO |
| February 6, 2027; 1:00 p.m., ESPN+ | | Delaware | | | | | | Great Southern Bank Arena; Springfield, MO |
| February 13, 2027; 12:00 p.m., ESPN+ | | at FIU | | | | | | Ocean Bank Convocation Center; Miami, FL |
| February 18, 2027; 6:30 p.m., ESPN+ | | at Middle Tennessee | | | | | | Murphy Center; Murfreesboro, TN |
| February 20, 2027; 2:00 p.m., ESPN+ | | at Western Kentucky | | | | | | E. A. Diddle Arena; Bowling Green, KY |
| February 25, 2027; 6:30 p.m., ESPN+ | | Kennesaw State | | | | | | Great Southern Bank Arena; Springfield, MO |
| February 27, 2027; 1:00 p.m., ESPN+ | | Jacksonville State | | | | | | Great Southern Bank Arena; Springfield, MO |
| March 4, 2027; 7:00 p.m., ESPN+ | | at New Mexico State | | | | | | Pan American Center; Las Cruces, NM |
| March 6, 2027; 1:00 p.m., ESPN+ | | at Sam Houston | | | | | | Bernard Johnson Coliseum; Huntsville, TX |
C-USA tournament
| March 9–13, 2027; TBA | | vs. | | | | | | Propst Arena; Huntsville, AL |
*Non-conference game. ^{#}Rankings from AP Poll. (#) Tournament seedings in parentheses. All times are in Central.
