= Liberty Lady Flames basketball =

Women's college basketball team

Liberty Lady Flames
2026–27 Liberty Lady Flames basketball team
- University: Liberty University
- Head coach: Alexis Sherard (2nd season)
- Location: Lynchburg, Virginia
- Arena: Liberty Arena (primary); Vines Center (capacity: 4,000 (Liberty Arena); 8,085 (Vines Center))
- Conference: C-USA
- Nickname: Lady Flames
- Colors: Red, white, and blue
- Student section: The Furnace

NCAA Division I tournament Sweet Sixteen
- 2005

NCAA Division I tournament appearances
- 1997, 1998, 1999, 2000, 2001, 2002, 2003, 2004, 2005, 2006, 2008, 2009, 2010, 2012, 2013, 2015, 2018, 2025

Conference tournament champions
- 1997, 1998, 1999, 2000, 2001, 2002, 2003, 2004, 2005, 2006, 2008, 2009, 2010, 2012, 2013, 2015, 2018, 2025

Conference regular-season champions
- 1998, 1999, 2000, 2001, 2002, 2003, 2004, 2005, 2006, 2008, 2009, 2011, 2012, 2013, 2015, 2018, 2025

Uniforms
Home	Away	Alternate

The Liberty Lady Flames basketball team is the women's basketball team that represents Liberty University in Lynchburg, Virginia in NCAA Division I play. The Lady Flames compete in Conference USA (C-USA). They are currently coached by Alexis Sherard.

== History ==
Liberty was founded in 1971 as Lynchburg Baptist College, making it the second-youngest institution in NCAA Division I (only Florida Gulf Coast University, founded in 1991, is younger). (Note: While two other Division I members were officially founded after Florida Gulf Coast, both inherited their athletic programs from predecessor institutions that were D-I members: The University of Texas Rio Grande Valley (UTRGV) was founded in 2013 by a merger of two other institutions in the University of Texas System and began operation in 2015. UTRGV inherited its athletic program from one of the predecessor institutions, the University of Texas–Pan American, which traced its history to a junior college that opened in 1927.; Purdue University Fort Wayne (PFW) was one of the two new institutions founded in 2018 when the Indiana University and Purdue University systems dissolved Indiana University – Purdue University Fort Wayne (IPFW), which had been founded in 1964. The former IPFW athletic program was entirely transferred to PFW.) While men's basketball began play a year later, women's basketball did not start play until 1975, the same year in which the school changed its name to Liberty Baptist College and joined the National Association of Intercollegiate Athletics (NAIA). In 1980, LBC joined the NCAA as a Division II member while retaining its NAIA membership. In 1983, LBC gave up its NAIA membership and moved full-time to D-II. They were members of the East Coast Athletic Conference (for a brief amount of time in 1983) and the Mason-Dixon Athletic Conference (1983–88) in their time in Division II. During that time, LBC adopted its current name of Liberty University in 1985.

Liberty joined Division I in 1988, followed by a move to the Big South Conference in 1991. After a 5–22 season in 1995–96, the Lady Flames went 22–8 the next year while running the table and winning the Big South championship, their first ever conference title in history along with the bid to go to the NCAA tournament; they were beaten by Old Dominion 102–52 in the first round. The following year, they set the school record for most wins in program history along with a second straight Big South Tournament title and NCAA appearance with an undefeated regular season and wins in the conference tournament to go 28–0 before a loss to Tennessee 102–58 in the first round of the NCAA tournament (they tied the record for wins in 2008, going 28–4, including a Big South title). They have won just two NCAA Tournament games (2005), advancing to the Sweet Sixteen as a #13 seed after beating Penn State 78–70 and DePaul 88–79 before losing to #1 LSU 90–48 in the regional semifinals. They have also made an appearance in the WNIT (2016), losing to Villanova 67–51 in the first round. As of the end of the 2015–16 season, the Lady Flames have an all-time record of 674–469.

== NCAA tournament results ==
Liberty has appeared in the NCAA Division I women's basketball tournament eighteen times. They have a record of 2–18.

Year	Seed	Round	Opponent	Result
1997	#16	First round	#1 Old Dominion	L 52–102
1998	#16	First round	#1 Tennessee	L 58–102
1999	#14	First round	#3 Georgia	L 52–73
2000	#14	First round	#3 LSU	L 54–77
2001	#15	First round	#2 Georgia	L 48–77
2002	#14	First round	#3 South Carolina	L 61–69
2003	#13	First round	#4 Vanderbilt	L 44–54
2004	#14	First round	#3 Georgia	L 53–78
2005	#13	First round Second Round; Sweet Sixteen	#4 Penn State #5 DePaul #1 LSU	W 78–70; W 88–79; L 48–90
2006	#13	First round	#4 DePaul	L 43–68
2008	#12	First round	#5 Old Dominion	L 62–82
2009	#14	First round	#3 Louisville	L 42–62
2010	#13	First round	#4 Kentucky	L 77–83
2012	#16	First round	#1 Notre Dame	L 43–74
2013	#13	First round	#4 Purdue	L 43–77
2015	#13	First round	#4 North Carolina	L 65–71
2018	#14	First round	#3 Tennessee	L 60–100
2025	#13	First round	#4 Kentucky	L 78–79
