= Matt Insell =

American basketball coach (born 1982)

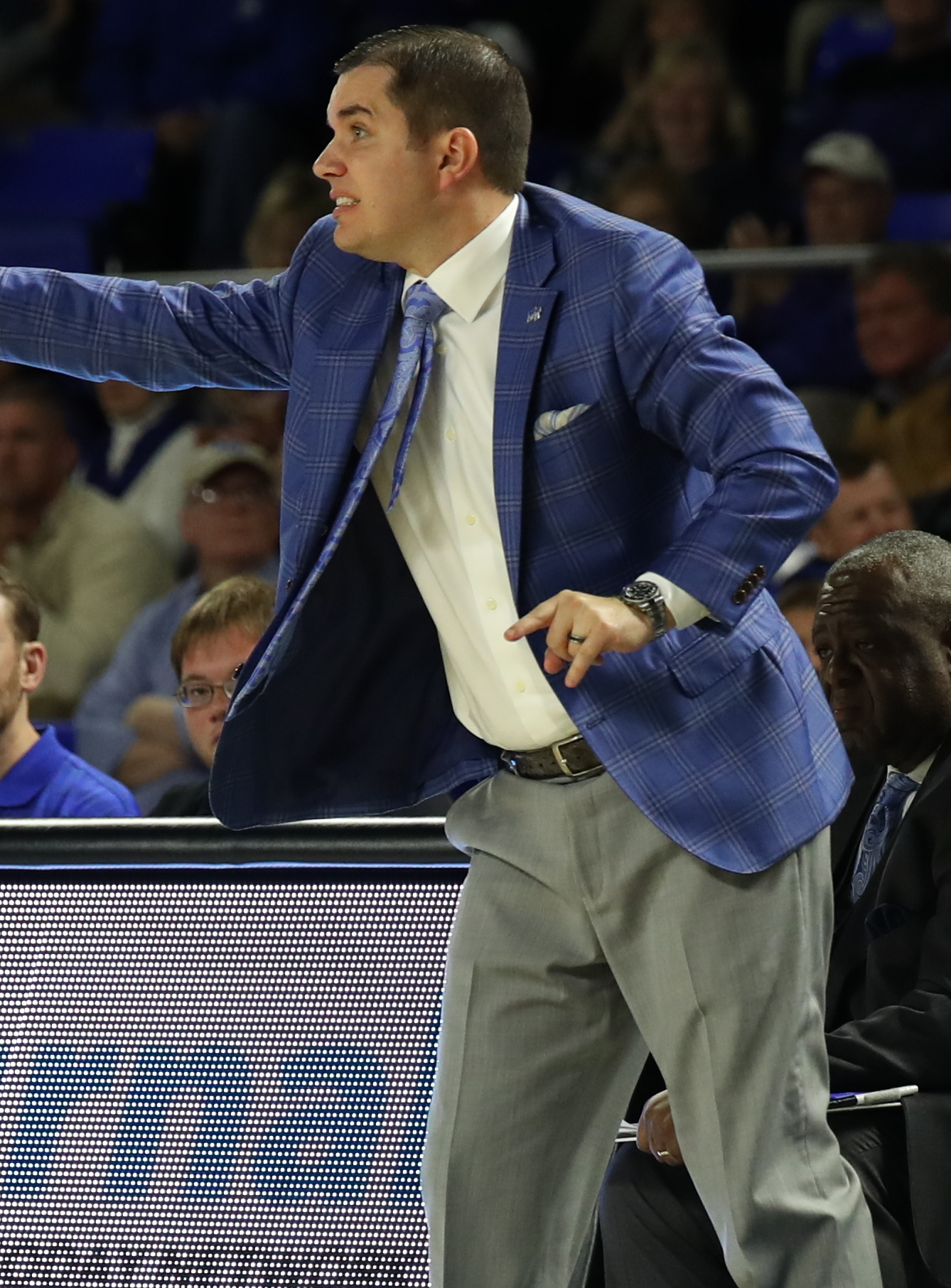
- Insell in 2019

Current position
- Title: Head Coach
- Team: Middle Tennessee
- Conference: C-USA
- Record: 0-0

Biographical details
- Born: September 22, 1982 (age 44); Shelbyville, Tennessee, U.S.
- Education: Middle Tennessee ('06)

Coaching career (HC unless noted)
- 2008–2013: Kentucky (Asst.)
- 2013–2018: Ole Miss
- 2018–2022: Middle Tennessee (Asst.)
- 2022–2026: Middle Tennessee (AHC)
- 2026–present: Middle Tennessee

Administrative career (AD unless noted)
- 2007–2008: Louisiana Tech (Dir of Ops.)

Head coaching record
- Overall: 70–87 (.446)

Matthew Ollen Insell (born September 22, 1982) is the current head coach of women's basketball at Middle Tennessee State University. Insell was the head coach of the Ole Miss women's basketball team from 2013 to 2018 before he was let go by Ole Miss following the 2018 season. Prior to his time at Ole Miss, Insell spent 5 years as an Assistant Coach at the University of Kentucky and one year as the Director of Basketball Operations at Louisiana Tech University. On May 7, 2018, Matt Insell was hired to work as assistant coach at Middle Tennessee State University. September 20, 2022, Matt Insell was promoted to Associate Head Coach at Middle Tennessee State University.

Insell has been a part of twelve teams that have participated in postseason play. Four of his teams at Kentucky advanced to the NCAA Tournament with three reaching the Elite Eight and another falling in the second round. Middle Tennessee State advanced to the NCAA Tournament three times with Matt Insell on staff including making the Final 32 of the NCAA Tournament with a first round win over Louisville in 2024. Insell has also participated in the WNIT five times, once with Kentucky, twice with Ole Miss and twice at Middle Tennessee, including advancing to the final four in 2022.

== Before career ==
Before his time at Kentucky, Insell was the director of basketball operations at Louisiana Tech under head coach Chris Long. He landed at Louisiana Tech following an extremely successful career as one of the top AAU coaches in the country, leading the Tennessee Flight—a Nike EYBL travel program. 41 of his former EYBL players went on to play Division I basketball, including three first round WNBA Draft Picks in Victoria Dunlap, Natalie Novosel, and LaSondra Barrett. He also coached the Shelbyville Sports Shop 15-Under team to the AAU National Championship title in 2004.

Insell attended the University of Tennessee from 2001 to 2005. He worked closely with both the men's and women's basketball programs, serving as a student assistant and student video coordinator under former men's head coach Buzz Peterson and as an instructor at Pat Summitt's summer basketball camps. The Shelbyville, Tennessee, native transferred to Middle Tennessee State during the 2005–06 season.

== Career ==
Insell spent five years as an assistant coach for a successful Kentucky Wildcat team under head coach Matthew Mitchell. While there, UK recorded four 20-win seasons and four trips to the NCAA Tournament—ending each of the last three seasons he spent in Lexington ranked in the top-25.

Insell, who was responsible for the guards while also having recruiting and player development duties, served as the top assistant coach and helped UK ink three top-10 recruiting classes and seven McDonald's All-Americans. During his time at Kentucky, Insell helped develop guard A'dia Mathies, a two-time SEC Player of the Year, and Bria Goss who was named SEC Freshman of the Year.

During his time at Ole Miss, Insell led the program to four top-25 wins and two 17-plus win seasons amidst the competitive SEC schedule. After five seasons at Kentucky, he was named the eighth head women's basketball coach in Ole Miss history (3/28/13).

Insell led Ole Miss to two national postseason tournaments where they competed in the WNIT. Ole Miss opened its brand-new arena, The Pavilion at Ole Miss, with 12-straight home wins—the most home since the late 1980s when Ole Miss won 15 straight. Ole Miss also set a new attendance record for the third straight year with 8,088 fans in attendance to see the Rebels earn their 800th win in program history over Jackson State.

Insell guided Ole Miss to some significant wins during his tenure, knocking off eventual Elite Eight school and 25th-ranked Oregon at home, 83–67—marking the third-straight season with a top-25 win under Insell. The Rebels also ended a pair of long losing streaks during the year, breaking a 28-game losing streak that dated back to 1996 against Tennessee (67–62), as well as picking up the first win over Texas A&M since 1997 on Senior Night with a 62–49 victory.

Insell led a young team in 2015–16 with just two seniors and only two returnees that had been in the program for more than two seasons, but the Rebels still produced some exciting moments on the court. For the second consecutive season, the Rebels knocked off a ranked foe with a 67–59 victory over No. 9 Kentucky. The win was the first over a top-10 school for Ole Miss since 2010, when the Rebels took down No. 8 Georgia (66–65).

In his second year at Ole Miss in 2014-15, Insell led the Rebels to 19 wins and seven victories in SEC play, the most overall wins since the 2009–10 season. The Rebels also returned to the postseason with a third-round foray into the WNIT.

The Rebels, who improved seven wins in 2014–15, posted four wins over NCAA Tournament participants, and, after being picked to finish last in the SEC preseason coaches and media poll, closed the season tied for No. 7 in the league standings. Ole Miss garnered the No. 8 seed for the SEC Tournament—the highest seed for the Rebels in five seasons.

In 2014–15, Insell and the Rebels knocked off ranked foes in No. 13 Kentucky and No. 18 Georgia—the first time in five years Ole Miss had defeated a ranked foe. The season also saw Ole Miss pick up its 400th win at Tad Smith Coliseum. One of the high points of the season was when Insell and his father, Rick, made women's basketball history by becoming the first father-son duo to play against each other in NCAA women's basketball when Middle Tennessee made the trip to Oxford in November. Insell laid the foundation for the Rebels during his first season in 2013–14, leading Ole Miss to a 10–6 non-conference record and a seven-game winning streak—the longest streak for the Rebels since the 2007–08 season.

After battling through the challenging SEC schedule, the Rebels entered the SEC Tournament as the No. 14 seed, looking to take the momentum from a regular season finale victory over Auburn into the postseason tournament. Drawing the No. 11 seed Arkansas, the Rebels earned a 63–62 victory. Insell also led the Rebels to wins over instate rival, Mississippi State, to give the first-year head coach his first SEC victory.

== Personal life ==
Insell is married to the former Autumn Clark, they have 2 children, a son Clark and daughter Evie.

== Head coaching record ==
Record table
Season	Team	Overall	Conference	Standing	Postseason
Ole Miss (Southeastern Conference) (2013–2018)
2013–14	Ole Miss	12–20	2–14	14th	
2014–15	Ole Miss	19–14	7–9	T–7th	WNIT Third Round
2015–16	Ole Miss	10–20	2–14	14th	
2016–17	Ole Miss	17–14	6–10	10th	WNIT First Round
2017–18	Ole Miss	12–19	1–15	14th	
Ole Miss:		70–87 (.446)	18–62 (.225)		
Middle Tennessee Blue Raiders (Conference USA) (2026–present)
2026–27	Middle Tennessee	0–0	0–0		
Middle Tennessee:		0–0 (–)	0–0 (–)		
Total:		70–87 (.446)			
National champion Postseason invitational champion Conference regular season champion Conference regular season and conference tournament champion Division regular season champion Division regular season and conference tournament champion Conference tournament champion
