= C'eira Ricketts =

American basketball player

Personal information
- Born: February 22, 1990 (age 36) Louisville, Kentucky, U.S.
- Listed height: 5 ft 9 in (1.75 m)

Career information
- College: Arkansas (2008–2012)
- WNBA draft: 2012: 2nd round, 24th overall pick
- Drafted by: Phoenix Mercury

Career history
- 2012: Phoenix Mercury

Career highlights
- First-team All-SEC (2012); SEC Freshman of the Year (2009); SEC All-Freshman Team (2009)
- Stats at Basketball Reference
Medals
Women's basketball
Representing the United States
FIBA Under-19 World Cup
Gold medal – first place	2009 Thailand	Team

C'eira Nicole Ricketts (born February 22, 1990) is a basketball player. She was selected in the 2012 WNBA draft by the Phoenix Mercury, the 24th pick. She played basketball at the University of Arkansas.

== Arkansas statistics ==
Legend
GP	Games played	GS	Games started	MPG	Minutes per game
FG%	Field goal percentage	3P%	3-point field goal percentage	FT%	Free throw percentage
RPG	Rebounds per game	APG	Assists per game	SPG	Steals per game
BPG	Blocks per game	PPG	Points per game	**Bold**	Career high

Year	Team	GP	Points	FG%	3P%	FT%	RPG	APG	SPG	BPG	PPG
2008–09	Arkansas	32	402	**42.7**	22.2	**70.3**	**6.3**	3.9	2.6	0.5	12.6
2009–10	Arkansas	30	290	40.6	21.9	52.7	5.0	4.0	2.4	**0.8**	9.7
2010–11	Arkansas	**34**	**472**	38.1	**34.9**	68.2	4.7	3.7	2.3	0.4	**13.9**
2011–12	Arkansas	31	350	42.3	24.5	65.3	4.6	**4.4**	**2.7**	0.4	11.3
Career	Arkansas	127	1514	40.7	27.5	66.1	5.2	4.0	2.5	0.5	11.9
