= Yamanashi =

Yamanashi can refer to:

- Yamanashi Prefecture (山梨), Japan
  - Yamanashi, Yamanashi, city in Yamanashi Prefecture
- Joseph Yamanashi, a recurring character on MADtv played by Bobby Lee
- Yamanashi Hanzō (1864–1944), general in the Imperial Japanese Army, Minister of War and Governor-General of Korea from 1927 to 1929
- Yamanashi (山無し), Japanese for "no climax" (see yaoi)
