= Elías Piña =

Elías Piña may refer to:

- Elías Piña Province, a province of the Dominican Republic
- Elías Piña (soldier), Dominican soldier, namesake of the province
