= Monmouth Academy (New Jersey) =

Coordinates: 40.1283°N 74.2141°W

- 152 Lanes Mill Road; Howell, NJ 07731

Information
- Type: University-preparatory school
- Established: 1973
- Closed: 2011
- Grades: PK–12
- Website: www.monmouthacademy.org

Monmouth Academy (formerly Lakewood Preparatory) was a university preparatory, nonsectarian, coeducational day school located in Howell Township, New Jersey, United States, serving students in pre-kindergarten through twelfth grade. Founded in 1973 by Lois Hirshkowitz, Monmouth Academy was formerly known as Lakewood Prep School. The school offered small classes, but an extensive offering of Advanced Placement courses, Mandarin Chinese and art classes taught by professional artists.

As of the 2009-10 school year, the school had an enrollment of 89 students (plus 4 in pre-K) and 20.5 classroom teachers (on an FTE basis), for a student–teacher ratio of 4.3.

Monmouth Academy was overseen by the New Jersey Department of Education and is a member of the New Jersey Association of Independent Schools. The school had been accredited by the Middle States Association of Colleges and Schools Commission on Secondary Schools since 1995.

The school was closed in 2011.

== Extracurriculars ==
Club offerings:

- Backgammon & Chess
- Bowling
- Craft Club
- Calligraphy
- Community Service
- Poetry
- Science
- Soccer
- Student Council

== The Challenge ==
On January 19, 2008, Monmouth Academy was featured on the Cablevision quiz show, The Challenge. They defeated Eastern Christian High School of North Haledon, NJ and moved on to Round Two being taped at the end of February. On April 12, 2008, Monmouth Academy was once again featured on the Cablevision quiz show, The Challenge. They defeated Northern Valley Regional High School at Old Tappan in a tie-breaker round and moved on to Round Three, taped in February and aired in May. On May 17, 2008, Monmouth Academy defeated Old Bridge High School in their third round match on The Challenge, placing them in the state semi-finals. On May 24, 2008, Monmouth Academy lost to Bergen County Academies in the semi-final round of The Challenge for New Jersey.

== Notable alumni ==
- Paul Wesley (born 1982), actor known for his role as Stefan Salvatore in The CW TV series The Vampire Diaries.
