= Liberty Arena =

4,000-seat arena in Lynchburg, Virginia

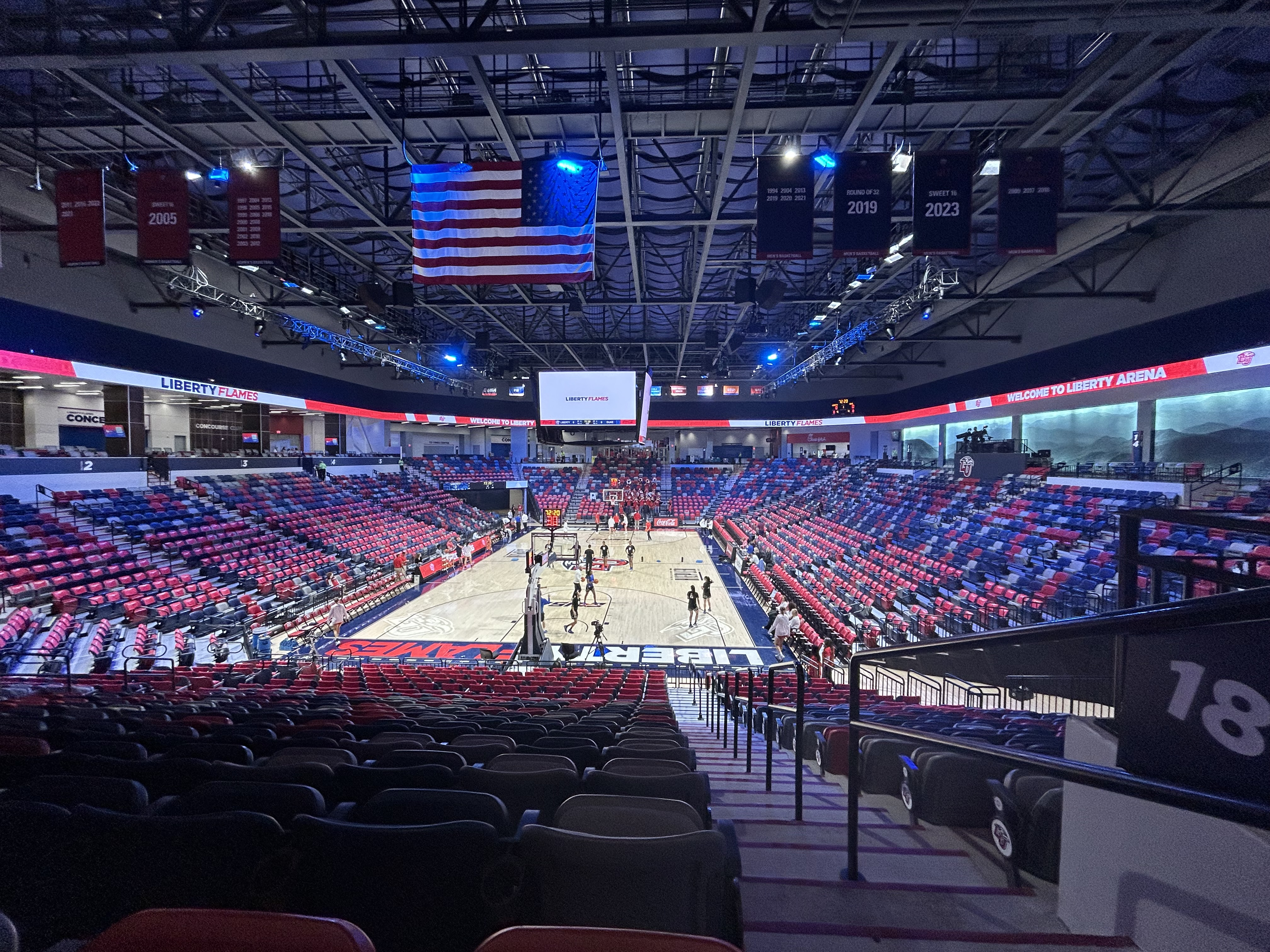
- The Interior of Liberty Arena
- Interactive map of Liberty Arena
- Location: Lynchburg, VA
- Coordinates: 37.349356°N 79.180225°W
- Owner: Liberty University
- Operator: Liberty University
- Capacity: 4,000 (Basketball); 4,500 (Floor seating)
- Surface: Hardwood

Construction
- Groundbreaking: Fall 2018
- Opened: November 23, 2020
- Cost: $65 million

Tenants
- Liberty Flames basketball (2020–present); Liberty Lady Flames basketball (2020–present); Liberty Lady Flames volleyball (2021–present)

Liberty Arena is a 4,000-seat arena in Lynchburg, Virginia on the campus of Liberty University. Construction began in the fall of 2018 and was completed in 2020, with a ceremonial opening held on November 23 of that year. The arena is home to the Liberty Flames and Lady Flames men's and women's basketball teams, the Lady Flames volleyball team, and other events for which attendance is not expected to exceed 4,000.

Liberty Arena is adjacent to the Flames and Lady Flames' previous home, the Vines Center, with a tunnel connecting the two venues. "The Furnace" will continue to host Flames and Lady Flames games and events where attendance is expected to exceed 4,000. The first scheduled event was the Lady Flames' 76–53 win over Norfolk State on December 1, 2020. Two days later, the men's basketball team made its debut, defeating Saint Francis (PA) 78–62. The arena had originally been scheduled to open for Lady Flames volleyball in August 2020; however, after COVID-19 caused most NCAA teams, including Liberty, to move the women's volleyball season from its normal fall schedule to spring 2021 (with the NCAA moving its championship event to the spring), the volleyball opening was moved to January 22, 2021, against VCU.

== See also ==
- List of NCAA Division I basketball arenas
