= 2026 SEC women's basketball tournament =

American college basketball postseason tournament

- Classification: Division I
- Season: 2025–26
- Teams: 16
- Site: Bon Secours Wellness Arena; Greenville, SC
- Champions: Texas (1st title)
- Winning coach: Vic Schaefer (2nd title)
- MVP: Madison Booker (Texas)
- Attendance: 66,186
- Television: SEC Network, ESPN, ESPN2

2025–26 SEC women's basketball standings
	Conf.				Overall
Team	W		L	PCT	W		L	PCT
No. 3 South Carolina	15	–	1	.938	31	–	2	.939
No. 5 Vanderbilt	13	–	3	.813	27	–	4	.871
No. 4 Texas †	13	–	3	.813	30	–	3	.909
No. 6 LSU	12	–	4	.750	27	–	5	.844
No. 7 Oklahoma	11	–	5	.688	24	–	7	.774
Tennessee	8	–	8	.500	16	–	13	.552
No. 24 Ole Miss	8	–	8	.500	23	–	11	.676
No. 22 Georgia	8	–	8	.500	22	–	9	.710
No. 17 Kentucky	8	–	8	.500	23	–	10	.697
Texas A&M	7	–	9	.438	14	–	12	.538
Alabama	7	–	9	.438	23	–	10	.697
Florida	5	–	11	.313	18	–	15	.545
Mississippi State	5	–	11	.313	18	–	13	.581
Missouri	4	–	12	.250	16	–	16	.500
Auburn	3	–	13	.188	15	–	17	.469
Arkansas	1	–	15	.063	12	–	20	.375
† 2026 SEC tournament winner As of March 7, 2026; Rankings from AP poll

The 2026 Southeastern Conference women's basketball tournament was the postseason women's basketball tournament for the Southeastern Conference which was held at the Bon Secours Wellness Arena in Greenville, South Carolina, from March 4–8, 2026. The winner of this tournament earns an automatic bid to the 2026 NCAA tournament.

No. 3 Texas defeated defending champions No. 1 South Carolina 78–61 in the championship game, earning their first SEC title since joining the conference in 2024.

== Seeds ==
Seed	School	SEC Record	Tiebreakers
1	South Carolina #‡	15–1	
2	Vanderbilt ‡	13–3	1–0 vs. Texas
3	Texas ‡	13–3	0–1 vs. Vanderbilt
4	LSU ‡	12–4	
5	Oklahoma †	11–5	
6	Tennessee †	8–8	2–1 vs. Ole Miss/Georgia/Kentucky
7	Ole Miss †	8–8	2–2 vs. Tennessee/Georgia/Kentucky; 1–0 vs. Oklahoma
8	Georgia †	8–8	2–2 vs. Tennessee/Ole Miss/Kentucky; 0–1 vs. Oklahoma
9	Kentucky	8–8	1–2 vs. Tennessee/Ole Miss/Georgia
10	Texas A&M	7–9	1–0 vs. Alabama
11	Alabama	7–9	0–1 vs. Texas A&M
12	Florida	5–11	1–0 vs. Mississippi State
13	Mississippi State	5–11	0–1 vs. Florida
14	Missouri	4–12	
15	Auburn	3–13	
16	Arkansas	1–15	
# – SEC regular season champions, and tournament No. 1 seed. ‡ – Received a double-bye in the conference tournament. † – Received a single-bye in the conference tournament.

== Schedule ==
Game	Time*	Matchup^{#}	Score	Television	Attendance
First round – Wednesday, March 4, 2026
1	11:00 a.m.	No. 9 Kentucky vs. No. 16 Arkansas	94−64	SECN	10,322
2	1:30 p.m.	No. 12 Florida vs. No. 13 Mississippi State	86–68	SECN	10,322
3	6:00 p.m.	No. 10 Texas A&M vs. No. 15 Auburn	49–50	SECN	5,072
4	8:30 p.m.	No. 11 Alabama vs. No. 14 Missouri	65–48	SECN	5,072
Second round – Thursday, March 5, 2026
5	11:00 a.m.	No. 8 Georgia vs. No. 9 Kentucky	61−76	SECN	6,928
6	1:30 p.m.	No. 5 Oklahoma vs. No. 12 Florida	82−64	SECN	6,928
7	6:00 p.m.	No. 7 Ole Miss vs. Auburn	73–57	SECN	5,810
8	8:30 p.m.	No. 6 Tennessee vs. No. 11 Alabama	64–76	SECN	5,810
Quarterfinals – Friday, March 6, 2026
9	12:00 p.m.	No. 1 South Carolina vs. No. 9 Kentucky	87–64	ESPN	11,154
10	2:30 p.m.	No. 4 LSU vs. No. 5 Oklahoma	112–78	ESPN	11,154
11	6:00 p.m.	No. 2 Vanderbilt vs. No. 7 Ole Miss	78–89	SECN	11,154
12	8:30 p.m.	No. 3 Texas vs. No. 11 Alabama	83–60	SECN	11,154
Semifinals – Saturday, March 7, 2026
13	4:30 p.m.	No. 1 South Carolina vs. No. 4 LSU	83–77	ESPN2	13,333
14	7:00 p.m.	No. 3 Texas vs. No. 7 Ole Miss	85–68	ESPN2	13,333
Championship – Sunday, March 8, 2026
15	3:00 p.m.	No. 1 South Carolina vs. No. 3 Texas	61–78	ESPN	13,567
*Game times in EST. #-Rankings denote tournament seeding.

== Bracket ==
First round Wednesday, March 4 SECN
9	17 Kentucky	94
16	Arkansas	64
12	Florida	86
13	Mississippi State	68
10	Texas A&M	49
15	Auburn	50
11	Alabama	65
14	Missouri	48

Second round Thursday, March 5 SECN
8	22 Georgia	61
9	17 Kentucky	76
5	7 Oklahoma	82
12	Florida	64
7	24 Ole Miss	73
15	Auburn	57
6	Tennessee	64
11	Alabama	76

Quarterfinals; Friday, March 6 ESPN/SECN
1	3 South Carolina	87
9	17 Kentucky	64
4	6 LSU	112
5	7 Oklahoma	78
2	5 Vanderbilt	78
7	24 Ole Miss	89
3	4 Texas	83
11	Alabama	60

Semifinals; Saturday, March 7 ESPN2
1	3 South Carolina	83
4	6 LSU	77
7	24 Ole Miss	68
3	4 Texas	85

Championship; Sunday, March 8 ESPN
1	3 South Carolina	61
3	4 Texas	78
