= 2025–26 Mississippi State Bulldogs women's basketball team =

Intercollegiate basketball season

2025–26 Mississippi State Bulldogs women's basketball
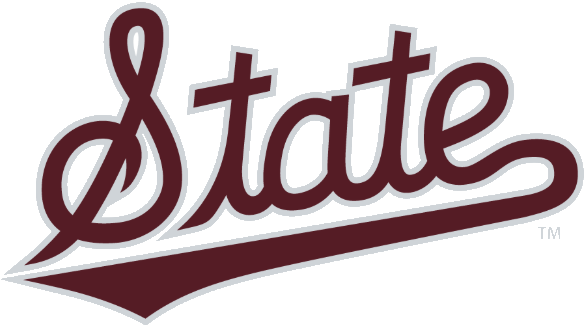

Emerald Coast Classic Bay Bracket champions
- Conference: Southeastern Conference
- Record: 18–13 (5–11 SEC)
- Head coach: Sam Purcell (4th season)
- Associate head coach: Fred Castro
- Assistant coaches: Anita Howard; Samantha Williams; Tony Dukes
- Home arena: Humphrey Coliseum

2025–26 SEC women's basketball standings
	Conf.				Overall
Team	W		L	PCT	W		L	PCT
No. 2 South Carolina	15	–	1	.938	36	–	4	.900
No. 10 Vanderbilt	13	–	3	.813	29	–	5	.853
No. 4 Texas †	13	–	3	.813	35	–	4	.897
No. 8 LSU	12	–	4	.750	29	–	6	.829
No. 12 Oklahoma	11	–	5	.688	26	–	8	.765
Tennessee	8	–	8	.500	16	–	14	.533
No. 21 Ole Miss	8	–	8	.500	24	–	12	.667
Georgia	8	–	8	.500	22	–	10	.688
No. 14 Kentucky	8	–	8	.500	25	–	11	.694
Texas A&M	7	–	9	.438	14	–	13	.519
No. 24 Alabama	7	–	9	.438	24	–	11	.686
Florida	5	–	11	.313	18	–	15	.545
Mississippi State	5	–	11	.313	18	–	13	.581
Missouri	4	–	12	.250	17	–	17	.500
Auburn	3	–	13	.188	15	–	17	.469
Arkansas	1	–	15	.063	12	–	20	.375
† 2026 SEC tournament winner Rankings from AP poll

The 2025–26 Mississippi State Bulldogs women's basketball team represented Mississippi State University during the 2025–26 NCAA Division I women's basketball season. The Bulldogs, led by fourth-year head coach Sam Purcell, play their home games at Humphrey Coliseum and compete as members of the Southeastern Conference (SEC).

== Previous season ==
The Bulldogs finished the 2024–25 season 22–12, 7–9 in SEC play to finish in tenth place. As the No. 10 seed in the SEC tournament, they defeated Missouri in the first round before losing in the second round to Ole Miss. They received an at-large bid to the NCAA tournament as the No. 9 seed Spokane 4 region. They defeated California in the first round before losing to USC in the second round.

== Offseason ==
=== Departures ===
Mississippi State Departures
Name	Number	Pos.	Height	Year	Hometown	Reason for departure
Denim DeShields	0	G	5'5"	Junior	Atlanta, GA	Transferred to Ole Miss
JerKaila Jordan	2	G	5'10"	Graduate Student	New Orleans, LA	Graduated
Terren Ward	3	G/F	5'11"	Graduate Student	Jesup, GA	Graduated
Eniya Russell	4	G/F	6'0"	Graduate Student	Baltimore, MD	Graduated
Shakirah Edwards	6	G	5'10"	Freshman	Panama City, FL	Transferred to Troy
Anaisha Carriere	8	G/F	6'2"	Freshman	Gulfport, MS	Transferred to Southern Miss
Tahj-Monet Bloom	11	F	6'2"	Freshman	Okinawa, Japan	Transferred to Nevada
Kayla Thomas	14	F	6'2"	Senior	Beltsville, MD	Graduated
Madina Okot	15	C	6'6"	Junior	Mumias, Kenya	Transferred to South Carolina
Debreasha Powe	21	G/F	6'1"	Junior	Meridian, MS	Transferred to Ole Miss
Quanirah Montague	24	F	6'5"	Sophomore	Atlantic City, NJ	Transferred to Auburn

=== Incoming transfers ===
Mississippi State Incoming Transfers
Name	Number	Pos.	Height	Year	Hometown	Previous school
Saniyah King	0	G	5'7"	Sophomore	Washington, D.C.	Howard
Trayanna Crisp	4	G	5'8"	Senior	Goodyear, AZ	North Carolina
Awa Fane	8	G		Junior	Thiès, Senegal	Panola College
Faith Wylder	23	C	6'5"	Sophomore	New York City, NY	Stony Brook
Favour Nwaedozi	25	F	6'3"	Junior	Delta, Nigeria	Mukogawa
Kharyssa Richardson	33	F	6'2"	Senior	Douglasville, GA	Ole Miss

=== 2025 recruiting class ===
College recruiting
Name	Hometown	School	Height	Weight	Commit date
Jaylah Lampley; G	Indianapolis, IN	Lawrence Central High School	6 ft 1 in (1.85 m)	N/A	
Jaylah Lampley; G	Recruit ratings: ESPN: (95)				
Madison Francis; F	Lancaster, NY	Lancaster Central High School	6 ft 1 in (1.85 m)	N/A	
Madison Francis; F	Recruit ratings: ESPN: (94)				
Nataliyah Gray; F	Houston, TX	Alief Taylor High School	6 ft 3 in (1.91 m)	N/A	
Nataliyah Gray; F	Recruit ratings: ESPN: (91)				
Overall recruit ranking:
Note: In many cases, Scout, Rivals, 247Sports, On3, and ESPN may conflict in their listings of height and weight.; In these cases, the average was taken. ESPN grades are on a 100-point scale.; Sources: "2025 Player Commits". ESPN. Archived from the original on September 24, 2025.

=== 2026 recruiting class ===
College recruiting (2026)
Name	Hometown	School	Height	Weight	Commit date
Lani Smallwood; PG	Blountsville, AL	Susan Moore High School	5 ft 7 in (1.70 m)	N/A	
Lani Smallwood; PG	Recruit ratings: ESPN: (91)				
Overall recruit ranking:
Note: In many cases, Scout, Rivals, 247Sports, On3, and ESPN may conflict in their listings of height and weight.; In these cases, the average was taken. ESPN grades are on a 100-point scale.; Sources: "2026 Player Commits". ESPN. Archived from the original on September 24, 2025.

== Roster ==
2025–26 Mississippi State Bulldogs women's basketball team
Players
Coaches

Pos.	#	Name	Height	Year	Previous school	Hometown
G	0	Saniyah King	5 ft 7 in (1.7 m)	So	Bishop Ireton HS; Howard	Washington, D.C.
G	2	Destiney McPhaul	5 ft 9 in (1.75 m)	RS Sr	West Catholic Prep; Northwest Florida State College	Philadelphia, PA
G	4	Trayanna Crisp	5 ft 8 in (1.73 m)	Sr	Millennium HS; North Carolina	Goodyear, AZ
G/F	5	Chandler Prater	5 ft 10 in (1.78 m)	GS	North Kansas City HS; Oklahoma State	Kansas City, MO
G	8	Awa Fane	5 ft 8 in (1.73 m)	Jr	Panola College	Thiès, Senegal
G	10	Jaylah Lampley	6 ft 1 in (1.85 m)	Fr	Lawrence Central HS	Indianapolis, IN
C	13	Rocío Jiménez	6 ft 7 in (2.01 m)	RS So	Central Pointe Christian Academy	Elías Piña, Dominican Republic
F	22	Nataliyah Gray	6 ft 3 in (1.91 m)	Fr	Alief Taylor HS	Houston, TX
C	23	Faith Wylder	6 ft 6 in (1.98 m)	So	Potomac Homeschool Christian Academy; Stony Brook	New York, NY
F	25	Favour Nwaedozi	6 ft 3 in (1.91 m)	Jr	Hakuho Girls' HS; Mukogawa	Delta, Nigeria
F	33	Kharyssa Richardson	6 ft 2 in (1.88 m)	Sr	New Manchester HS; Ole Miss	Douglasville, GA
F	40	Madison Francis	6 ft 2 in (1.88 m)	Fr	Lancaster Central HS	Lancaster, NY

Head coach

- Sam Purcell (Auburn)

Assistant coach(es)

- Fred Castro (Oklahoma)
- Anita Howard (Armstrong State)
- Samantha Williams (Auburn)
- Tony Dukes (Clayton State)

Legend

- (C) Team captain
- (S) Suspended
- (I) Ineligible
- (W) Walk-on
- Injured
- Current redshirt

Roster

== Schedule and results ==
Date time, TV	Rank^{#}	Opponent^{#}	Result	Record	High points	High rebounds	High assists	Site (attendance) city, state
Exhibition
October 26, 2025*; 7:00 p.m.		Union (TN)	W 115–71		–	–	–	Humphrey Coliseum; Starkville, MS
Non-conference regular season
November 3, 2025*; 6:30 p.m., SECN+/ESPN+		Davidson	W 66–57	1–0	20 – McPhaul	10 – Nwaedozi	2 – Tied	Humphrey Coliseum (3,462); Starkville, MS
November 7, 2025*; 11:00 a.m., SECN+/ESPN+		Georgia State	W 88–62	2–0	17 – Nwaedozi	10 – Nwaedozi	6 – Crisp	Humphrey Coliseum (6,549); Starkville, MS
November 9, 2025*; 2:00 p.m., SECN+/ESPN+		Mississippi Valley State	W 107–43	3–0	25 – Prater	16 – Nwaedozi	5 – Prater	Humphrey Coliseum (3,566); Starkville, MS
November 13, 2025*; 6:30 p.m., SECN+/ESPN+		Jackson State	W 82–55	4–0	18 – Nwaedozi	15 – Nwaedozi	4 – Nwaedozi	Humphrey Coliseum (3,542); Starkville, MS
November 20, 2025*; 6:00 p.m., ESPN+		at Texas Tech	L 62–69	4–1	12 – Tied	9 – Tied	4 – McPhaul	United Supermarkets Arena (3,652); Lubbock, TX
November 24, 2025*; 1:30 p.m., FloHoops		vs. Alcorn State; Emerald Coast Classic Bay Bracket semifinals	W 65–51	5–1	15 – Francis	10 – Lampley	4 – Tied	Raider Arena (750); Niceville, FL
November 25, 2025*; 1:30 p.m., FloHoops		vs. Middle Tennessee; Emerald Coast Classic Bay Bracket finals	W 69–47	6–1	17 – Francis	6 – Tied	5 – McPhaul	Raider Arena (750); Niceville, FL
November 30, 2025*; 2:00 p.m., SECN+/ESPN+		Louisiana–Monroe	W 66–54	7–1	13 – Nwaedozi	13 – Francis	3 – Tied	Humphrey Coliseum (3,411); Starkville, MS
December 4, 2025*; 6:00 p.m., SECN		Pittsburgh; ACC–SEC Challenge	W 79–44	8–1	22 – McPhaul	10 – Francis	4 – King	Humphrey Coliseum (3,433); Starkville, MS
December 7, 2025*; 2:00 p.m., SECN+/ESPN+		Charlotte	W 89–59	9–1	16 – Tied	13 – Prater	3 – Tied	Humphrey Coliseum (3,473); Starkville, MS
December 14, 2025*; 2:00 p.m., SECN+/ESPN+		Southern Miss	W 87–64	10–1	21 – Nwaedozi	23 – Nwaedozi	4 – Tied	Humphrey Coliseum (3,833); Starkville, MS
December 17, 2025*; 6:30 p.m., SECN+/ESPN+		Alabama State	W 105–57	11–1	30 – Francis	11 – Prater	7 – Crisp	Humphrey Coliseum (3,289); Starkville, MS
December 20, 2025*; 11:00 a.m., ESPN+		at La Salle	W 85–37	12–1	18 – Lampley	16 – Nwaedozi	10 – McPhaul	John Glaser Arena (490); Philadelphia, PA
December 28, 2025*; 2:00 p.m., SECN+/ESPN+		Samford	W 112–54	13–1	30 – Nwaedozi	11 – Francis	10 – McPhaul	Humphrey Coliseum (3,588); Starkville, MS
SEC regular season
January 1, 2026; 3:00 p.m., SECN		Auburn	W 75–53	14–1 (1–0)	17 – Crisp	13 – Tied	3 – Tied	Humphrey Coliseum (3,710); Starkville, MS
January 4, 2026; 7:00 p.m., SECN+/ESPN+		at No. 8т Oklahoma	L 47–95	14–2 (1–1)	13 – Richardson	7 – Tied	2 – Nwaedozi	Lloyd Noble Center (5,504); Norman, OK
January 8, 2026; 6:30 p.m., SECN+/ESPN		No. 20 Tennessee	L 80–90	14–3 (1–2)	22 – Tied	13 – Francis	5 – McPhaul	Humphrey Coliseum (3,905); Starkville, MS
January 11, 2026; 5:00 p.m., SECN		at No. 18 Ole Miss; We Back Pat	L 68–93	14–4 (1–3)	15 – Tied	11 – Nwaedozi	4 – McPaul	SJB Pavilion (4,634); Oxford, MS
January 15, 2026; 5:30 p.m., SECN		No. 5 Vanderbilt	L 84−89	14−5 (1−4)	15 – Francis	8 – Francis	7 – Crisp	Humphrey Coliseum (4,082); Starkville, MS
January 18, 2026; 2:00 p.m., SECN+/ESPN+		No. 7 Kentucky	W 71–59	15–5 (2–4)	23 – Richardson	21 – Nwaedozi	6 – McPhaul	Humphrey Coliseum (4,612); Starkville, MS
January 25, 2026; 2:00 p.m., SECN+/ESPN+		at No. 23 Alabama	L 78–85	15–6 (2–5)	19 – Nwaedozi	8 – Francis	5 – McPhaul	Coleman Coliseum (2,791); Tuscaloosa, AL
January 29, 2026; 5:30 p.m., SECN+/ESPN+		at No. 15 Tennessee	W 77–62	16–6 (3–5)	21 – Richardson	14 – Nwaedozi	5 – McPaul	Thompson–Boling Arena (10,418); Knoxville, TN
February 1, 2026; 2:00 p.m., SECN+/ESPN+		Missouri	L 80–88	16–7 (3–6)	21 – Richardson	9 – Francis	9 – McPhaul	Humphrey Coliseum (4,214); Starkville, MS
February 5, 2026; 5:30 p.m., SECN		at No. 3 South Carolina; Play4Kay	L 45–88	16–8 (3–7)	12 – Francis	5 – Nwaedozi	3 – McPhaul	Colonial Life Arena (15,204); Columbia, SC
February 12, 2026; 6:30 p.m., SECN+/ESPN+		Georgia	W 85–71	17–8 (4–7)	17 – Tied	12 – Nwaedozi	6 – McPhaul	Humphrey Coliseum (3,651); Starkville, MS
February 16, 2026; 6:30 p.m., SECN		at Arkansas	W 75–66	18–8 (5–7)	16 – Lampley	10 – Nwaedozi	6 – McPhaul	Bud Walton Arena (2,101); Fayetteville, AR
February 19, 2026; 6:30 p.m., SECN+/ESPN+		Florida	L 56–71	18–9 (5–8)	20 – Francis	13 – Francis	6 – McPhaul	Humphrey Coliseum (3,582); Starkville, MS
February 22, 2026; 1:00 p.m., SECN		at No. 4 Texas	L 42–92	18–10 (5–9)	9 – Nwaedozi	4 – Tied	3 – King	Moody Center (10,705); Austin, TX
February 26, 2026; 7:00 p.m., SECN+/ESPN+		at Texas A&M	L 64–68	18–11 (5–10)	19 – Francis	14 – Nwaedozi	4 – Prater	Reed Arena (2,932); College Station, TX
March 1, 2026; 3:00 p.m., SECN		No. 6 LSU	L 63–72	18–12 (5–11)	18 – Richardson	11 – Nwaedozi	4 – Crisp	Humphrey Coliseum (5,337); Starkville, MS
SEC Tournament
March 4, 2026; 12:30 p.m., SECN	(13)	vs. (12) Florida; SEC Tournament first round	L 68–86	18–13	12 – Tied	10 – Nwaedozi	6 – McPhaul	Bon Secours Wellness Arena (10,322); Greenville, SC
*Non-conference game. ^{#}Rankings from AP Poll. (#) Tournament seedings in parentheses. All times are in Central Time.

== Rankings ==
Ranking movements Legend: ██ Increase in ranking ██ Decrease in ranking — = Not ranked RV = Received votes
	Week																				
Poll	Pre	1	2	3	4	5	6	7	8	9	10	11	12	13	14	15	16	17	18	19	Final
AP	—	—	—	—	—	—	—	—	—	—	—	—									
Coaches	RV	—	—	—	—	—	—	—	—	—	—	RV									

== See also ==
- 2025–26 Mississippi State Bulldogs men's basketball team
