= 2025–26 Oklahoma Sooners women's basketball team =

Intercollegiate basketball season

2025–26 Oklahoma Sooners women's basketball

Coconut Hoops Great Egret Division champions

NCAA tournament, Sweet Sixteen
- Conference: Southeastern Conference

Ranking
- Coaches: No. 10
- AP: No. 12
- Record: 26–8 (11–5 SEC)
- Head coach: Jennie Baranczyk (5th season)
- Associate head coach: Pauline Love
- Assistant coaches: Shannon Gage; Michael Neal; Tyus Hooks; Markisha Kastantin
- Home arena: Lloyd Noble Center

2025–26 SEC women's basketball standings
	Conf.				Overall
Team	W		L	PCT	W		L	PCT
No. 2 South Carolina	15	–	1	.938	36	–	4	.900
No. 10 Vanderbilt	13	–	3	.813	29	–	5	.853
No. 4 Texas †	13	–	3	.813	35	–	4	.897
No. 8 LSU	12	–	4	.750	29	–	6	.829
No. 12 Oklahoma	11	–	5	.688	26	–	8	.765
Tennessee	8	–	8	.500	16	–	14	.533
No. 21 Ole Miss	8	–	8	.500	24	–	12	.667
Georgia	8	–	8	.500	22	–	10	.688
No. 14 Kentucky	8	–	8	.500	25	–	11	.694
Texas A&M	7	–	9	.438	14	–	13	.519
No. 24 Alabama	7	–	9	.438	24	–	11	.686
Florida	5	–	11	.313	18	–	15	.545
Mississippi State	5	–	11	.313	18	–	13	.581
Missouri	4	–	12	.250	17	–	17	.500
Auburn	3	–	13	.188	15	–	17	.469
Arkansas	1	–	15	.063	12	–	20	.375
† 2026 SEC tournament winner Rankings from AP poll

The 2025–26 Oklahoma Sooners women's basketball team represented the University of Oklahoma during the 2025–26 NCAA Division I women's basketball season. The Sooners, led by fifth-year head coach Jennie Baranczyk, played their home games at the Lloyd Noble Center and compete as members of the Southeastern Conference (SEC).

== Previous season ==
The Sooner finished the 2024–25 season 27–8, 11–5 in SEC play to finish in a tie for fourth place. As the No. 5 seed in the SEC tournament, they defeated Georgia and Kentucky in the second round and the quarterfinals before losing Georgia. They received an at-large bid to the NCAA tournament as the No. 4 seed in the Spokane 4 region. They defeated Florida Gulf Coast and Iowa in the first and second rounds to advanced to the sweet sixteen, where they lost to National Champion UConn.

== Offseason ==
=== Departures ===
Oklahoma departures
Name	Number	Pos.	Height	Year	Hometown	Reason for departure
Nevaeh Tot	1	G	5'3"	Graduate student	Columbus, OH	Graduated
Reyna Scott	2	G	5'10"	Junior	New York, NY	Transferred to Louisville
Kiersten Johnson	5	F	6'4"	Junior	Duncanville, TX	Transferred to Baylor
Lexy Keys	15	G	5'7"	Graduate student	Tahlequah, OK	Graduated
Aubrey Joens	20	G	5'9"	Graduate student	Iowa City, IA	Graduated
Skylar Vann	24	F	6'0"	Graduate student	Edmond, OK	Graduated
Landry Allen	25	C	6'3"	Sophomore	Tuttle, OK	Transferred to Southwestern Oklahoma State
Liz Scott	34	F	6'2"	Graduate student	Houston, TX	Graduated

=== 2025 recruiting class ===
College recruiting
Name	Hometown	School	Height	Weight	Commit date
Aaliyah Chavez; PG	Lubbock, TX	Monterey High School	5 ft 11 in (1.80 m)	N/A	
Aaliyah Chavez; PG	Recruit ratings: ESPN: (98)				
Keziah Lofton; G	Yukon, OK	Bethany High School	5 ft 11 in (1.80 m)	N/A	
Keziah Lofton; G	Recruit ratings: ESPN: (94)				
Brooklyn Stewart; F	Colorado Springs, CO	Pine Creek High School	6 ft 2 in (1.88 m)	N/A	
Brooklyn Stewart; F	Recruit ratings: ESPN: (93)				
Overall recruit ranking:
Note: In many cases, Scout, Rivals, 247Sports, On3, and ESPN may conflict in their listings of height and weight.; In these cases, the average was taken. ESPN grades are on a 100-point scale.; Sources: "2025 Player Commits". ESPN. Archived from the original on September 27, 2025.

== Roster ==
2024–25 Oklahoma Sooners women's basketball team
Players
Coaches

Pos.	#	Name	Height	Year	Previous school	Hometown
C	0	Beatrice Culliton	6 ft 3 in (1.91 m)	Sr	Saint Thomas Aquinas HS	Overland Park, KS
G	2	Aaliyah Chavez	5 ft 10 in (1.78 m)	Fr	Monterey HS	Lubbock, TX
G	3	Zya Vann	5 ft 9 in (1.75 m)	So	Bethany HS	Edmond, OK
F	4	Caya Smith	6 ft 1 in (1.85 m)	So	Putnam City West HS	Oklahoma City, OK
F	6	Sahara Williams	5 ft 11 in (1.8 m)	Jr	West HS	Waterloo, IA
F	10	Emma Tolan	5 ft 11 in (1.8 m)	Fr	Virginia College	Virginia, Cavan, Ireland
G	12	Payton Verhulst	6 ft 1 in (1.85 m)	RS Sr	Bishop Miege HS; Louisville	De Soto, KS
C	15	Raegan Beers	6 ft 4 in (1.93 m)	Sr	Valor Christian HS; Oregon State	Littleton, CO
F	21	Brooklyn Stewart	6 ft 3 in (1.91 m)	Fr	Pine Creek HS	Colorado Springs, CO
G	22	Keziah Lofton	6 ft 0 in (1.83 m)	Fr	Bethany HS	Bethany, OK
C	26	Daffa Cissoko	6 ft 4 in (1.93 m)	Fr	Pays Voironnais Basket Club	Draveil, Paris, France

Head coach

- Jennie Baranczyk (Iowa)

Assistant coach(es)

- Pauline Love (Southern Miss)
- Shannon Gage (Missouri State)
- Michael Neal (Oklahoma)
- Tyus Hooks (Ole Miss)
- Markisha Kastantin (Notre Dame)

Legend

- (C) Team captain
- (S) Suspended
- (I) Ineligible
- (W) Walk-on
- Injured
- Current redshirt

Roster

== Schedule and results ==
Date time, TV	Rank^{#}	Opponent^{#}	Result	Record	High points	High rebounds	High assists	Site (attendance) city, state
Exhibition
October 29, 2025*; 6:00 p.m., SECN+/ESPN+	No. 6	Oklahoma Christian	W 106–41		18 – Williams	12 – Beers	6 – Verhulst	Lloyd Noble Center (1,535); Norman, OK
Non-conference regular season
November 3, 2025*; 4:30 p.m., SECN+/ESPN+	No. 6	Belmont	W 84–67	1–0	29 – Beers	14 – Williams	6 – Williams	Lloyd Noble Center (6,476); Norman, OK
November 10, 2025*; 9:30 p.m., FS1	No. 6	vs. No. 3 UCLA	L 59–73	1–1	16 – Verhulst	14 – Beers	4 – Verhulst	Golden 1 Center (1,463); Sacramento, CA
November 12, 2025*; 8:00 p.m., SECN	No. 6	Kansas City	W 89–61	2–1	29 – Chavez	8 – Williams	4 – Tied	Lloyd Noble Center (4,049); Norman, OK
November 14, 2025*; 10:30 a.m., SECN+/ESPN+	No. 6	North Alabama	W 89–61	3–1	20 – Beers	11 – Beers	5 – Williams	Lloyd Noble Center (8,405); Norman, OK
November 16, 2025*; 2:30 p.m., ESPN+	No. 6	at Western Carolina	W 95–32	4–1	21 – Beers	10 – Beers	5 – Chavez	Ramsey Center (1,575); Cullowhee, NC
November 19, 2025*; 6:00 p.m., SECN+/ESPN+	No. 8	East Texas A&M	W 112–59	5–1	23 – Beers	11 – Williams	6 – Chavez	Lloyd Noble Center (3,121); Norman, OK
November 28, 2025*; 5:30 p.m., FloHoops	No. 9	vs. Coppin State; Coconut Hoops Great Egret Division Semifinal	W 100–46	6–1	21 – Williams	14 – Beers	6 – Vann	Alico Arena (1,286); Fort Myers, FL
November 30, 2025*; 5:30 p.m., FloHoops	No. 9	vs. Florida State; Coconut Hoops Great Egret Division Final	W 109–91	7–1	29 – Chavez	14 – Williams	6 – Chavez	Alico Arena (1,204); Fort Myers, FL
December 3, 2025*; 6:15 p.m., ESPN2	No. 9	NC State; ACC–SEC Challenge	W 103–98 ^{OT}	8–1	33 – Chavez	12 – Beers	4 – Tied	Lloyd Noble Center (4,614); Norman, OK
December 7, 2025*; 2:00 p.m., SECN+/ESPN+	No. 9	Maryland Eastern Shore	W 90–37	9–1	16 – Verhulst	7 – Beers	8 – Williams	Lloyd Noble Center (3,252); Norman, OK
December 11, 2025*; 6:00 p.m., SECN+/ESPN+	No. 9	Little Rock	W 103–48	10–1	26 – Beers	15 – Beers	5 – Beers	Lloyd Noble Center (3,292); Norman, OK
December 13, 2025*; 3:00 p.m., ESPNU	No. 9	vs. No. 23 Oklahoma State; Bedlam Series	W 92–70	11–1	22 – Beers	12 – Beers	7 – Williams	Paycom Center (10,552); Oklahoma City, OK
December 22, 2025*; 12:00 p.m., SECN+/ESPN+	No. 8т	North Carolina Central	W 126–54	12–1	21 – Vann	10 – Tied	7 – Chavez	Lloyd Noble Center (3,570); Norman, OK
SEC regular season
January 1, 2026; 7:00 p.m., SECN+/ESPN+	No. 8т	at Texas A&M	W 72–50	13–1 (1–0)	20 – Chavez	12 – Beers	6 – Chavez	Reed Arena (3,847); College Station, TX
January 4, 2026; 2:00 p.m., SECN+/ESPN+	No. 8т	Mississippi State	W 95–47	14–1 (2–0)	17 – Chavez	11 – Tied	7 – Williams	Lloyd Noble Center (5,504); Norman, OK
January 8, 2026; 6:00 p.m., SECN+/ESPN+	No. 5	No. 18 Ole Miss	L 69–74	14–2 (2–1)	26 – Chavez	20 – Beers	4 – Beers	Lloyd Noble Center (4,327); Norman, OK
January 11, 2026; 3:00 p.m., SECN	No. 5	at No. 6 Kentucky; We Back Pat	L 57–63	14–3 (2–2)	18 – Chavez	9 – Tied	6 – Williams	Memorial Coliseum (5,714); Lexington, KY
January 18, 2026; 2:00 p.m., ESPN2	No. 13	No. 6 LSU	L 72–91	14–4 (2–3)	21 – Verhulst	11 – Beers	7 – Vann	Lloyd Noble Center (10,890); Norman, OK
January 22, 2026; 6:30 p.m., ESPN	No. 16	No. 2 South Carolina	W 94–82 ^{OT}	15–4 (3–3)	26 – Chavez	14 – Beers	8 – Chavez	Lloyd Noble Center (7,402); Norman, OK
January 25, 2026; 1:00 p.m., SECN	No. 16	at Auburn	W 72–65	16–4 (4–3)	18 – Chavez	9 – Williams	4 – Tied	Neville Arena (3,049); Auburn, AL
January 29, 2026; 6:00 p.m., SECN+/ESPN+	No. 10	Texas A&M	W 85–58	17–4 (5–3)	16 – Verhulst	9 – Williams	5 – Tied	Lloyd Noble Center (4,624); Norman, OK
February 1, 2026; 2:00 p.m., ABC	No. 10	at No. 4 Texas	L 70–78	17–5 (5–4)	18 – Verhulst	11 – Beers	4 – Verhulst	Moody Center (10,155); Austin, TX
February 9, 2026; 8:00 p.m., ESPN2	No. 10	at No. 5 Vanderbilt	L 86–102	17–6 (5–5)	19 – Beers	11 – Beers	6 – Tied	Memorial Gymnasium (3,316); Nashville, TN
February 12, 2026; 6:00 p.m., SECN+/ESPN+	No. 10	Florida	W 81–74	18–6 (6–5)	18 – Vann	9 – Verhulst	7 – Chavez	Lloyd Noble Center (4,309); Norman, OK
February 15, 2026; 3:00 p.m., SECN	No. 10	at No. 23 Alabama	W 79–71	19–6 (7–5)	21 – Beers	9 – Beers	6 – Chavez	Coleman Coliseum (3,463); Tuscaloosa, AL
February 19, 2026; 5:30 p.m., SECN	No. 11	at No. 24 Georgia	W 71–67	20–6 (8–5)	27 – Chavez	6 – Tied	5 – Chavez	Stegeman Coliseum (2,426); Athens, GA
February 22, 2026; 1:00 p.m., ESPN	No. 11	No. 21 Tennessee	W 100–93	21–6 (9–5)	22 – Williams	18 – Beers	4 – Chavez	Lloyd Noble Center (8,843); Norman, OK
February 26, 2026; 6:00 p.m., SECN+/ESPN+	No. 7	Arkansas	W 89–44	22–6 (10–5)	16 – Chavez	15 – Stewart	5 – Verhulst	Lloyd Noble Center (4,340); Norman, OK
March 1, 2026; 2:00 p.m., SECN+/ESPN+	No. 7	at Missouri	W 84–78	23–6 (11–5)	23 – Beers	12 – Verhulst	5 – Williams	Mizzou Arena (3,586); Columbia, MO
SEC Tournament
March 5, 2026; 12:30 p.m., SECN	(5) No. 7	vs. (12) Florida; Second round	W 82–64	24–6	18 – Beers	7 – Beers	7 – Williams	Bon Secours Wellness Arena (6,928); Greenville, SC
March 6, 2026; 1:30 p.m., ESPN	(5) No. 7	vs. (4) No. 6 LSU; Quarterfinals	L 78–112	24–7	20 – Chavez	10 – Williams	4 – Verhulst	Bon Secours Wellness Arena; Greenville, SC
NCAA Tournament
March 20, 2026*; 9:00 p.m., ESPN	(4 S4) No. 10	(11 S4) Idaho; First Round	W 89–59	25–7	18 – Beers	10 – Tied	5 – Chavez	Lloyd Noble Center (6,345); Norman, OK
March 22, 2026*; 7:00 p.m., ESPN	(4 S4) No. 10	(5 S4) No. 20 Michigan State; Second Round	W 77–71	26–7	18 – Tied	14 – Beers	6 – Tied	Lloyd Noble Center (6,573); Norman, OK
March 27, 2026*; 6:30 p.m., ESPN	(4 S4) No. 10	vs. (1 S4) No. 4 South Carolina; Sweet Sixteen	L 68–94	26–8	21 – Chavez	8 – Beers	3 – Chavez	Golden 1 Center; Sacramento, CA
*Non-conference game. ^{#}Rankings from AP Poll. (#) Tournament seedings in parentheses. S4=Sacramento 4. All times are in Central Time.

== Rankings ==
Ranking movements Legend: ██ Increase in ranking ██ Decrease in ranking т = Tied with team above or below
	Week																				
Poll	Pre	1	2	3	4	5	6	7	8	9	10	11	12	13	14	15	16	17	18	19	Final
AP	6	6	8	9	9	9	8	8т	8т*	5	13	16	10	11	10	11	7	7	10	10	12
Coaches	7	6	7	8	9	9	8	8т	9	5	12	16	11	11	10	9	7	8	9	9	10

*AP did not release a week 8 poll.

== See also ==
- 2025–26 Oklahoma Sooners men's basketball team
