= 2025–26 Florida Gators women's basketball team =

Intercollegiate basketball season

2025–26 Florida Gators women's basketball
- Conference: Southeastern Conference
- Record: 18–15 (5–11 SEC)
- Head coach: Kelly Rae Finley (5th season)
- Assistant coaches: Cynthia Jordan; Jackie Moore; Daniel Boice; Fred Williams
- Home arena: O'Connell Center

2025–26 SEC women's basketball standings
	Conf.				Overall
Team	W		L	PCT	W		L	PCT
No. 2 South Carolina	15	–	1	.938	36	–	4	.900
No. 10 Vanderbilt	13	–	3	.813	29	–	5	.853
No. 4 Texas †	13	–	3	.813	35	–	4	.897
No. 8 LSU	12	–	4	.750	29	–	6	.829
No. 12 Oklahoma	11	–	5	.688	26	–	8	.765
Tennessee	8	–	8	.500	16	–	14	.533
No. 21 Ole Miss	8	–	8	.500	24	–	12	.667
Georgia	8	–	8	.500	22	–	10	.688
No. 14 Kentucky	8	–	8	.500	25	–	11	.694
Texas A&M	7	–	9	.438	14	–	13	.519
No. 24 Alabama	7	–	9	.438	24	–	11	.686
Florida	5	–	11	.313	18	–	15	.545
Mississippi State	5	–	11	.313	18	–	13	.581
Missouri	4	–	12	.250	17	–	17	.500
Auburn	3	–	13	.188	15	–	17	.469
Arkansas	1	–	15	.063	12	–	20	.375
† 2026 SEC tournament winner Rankings from AP poll

The 2025–26 Florida Gators women's basketball team represents the University of Florida during the 2025–26 NCAA Division I women's basketball season. The Gators, led by fifth-year head coach Kelly Rae Finley, play their home games at the O'Connell Center and compete as members of the Southeastern Conference (SEC).

== Previous season ==
The Gators finished the 2024–25 season 19–18, 5–11 in SEC play to finish in eleventh place. As the No. 11 seed in the SEC tournament, they defeated Auburn in the first round and Alabama in the second round before losing in the quarterfinals to LSU. They received an at-large bid to the WBIT as the No. 3 seed in the Virginia Tech bracket. They defeated Northern Iowa, Alabama in the first and second rounds and Texas Tech in the quarterfinals before losing to Minnesota in the semifinals.

== Offseason ==
=== Departures ===
Florida Departures
Name	Number	Pos.	Height	Year	Hometown	Reason for departure
Alexia Gassett	3	F	6'2"	Junior	Reynoldsburg, OH	TBD
Kylee Kitts	5	G/F	6'4"	Freshman	Oviedo, FL	Transferred to Ohio State
Kenza Salgues	6	G	5'9"	Senior	Montpellier, France	Graduated
Jeriah Warren	20	G	6'0"	Senior	Lake Charles, LA	Graduated
Eriny Kindred	21	F	6'0"	Senior	Del Valle, TX	Graduated
Paige Clausen	22	F	6'0"	Senior	Naples, FL	Graduated
Ra Shaya Kyle	24	C	6'6"	Senior	Marion, IN	Transferred to Miami (FL)

=== Incoming transfers ===
Florida incoming transfers
Name	Number	Pos.	Height	Year	Hometown	Previous school
Sarah Deng	0	G	5'10"	Junior	Adelaide, Australia	Eastern Arizona College
Jade Weatherby	1	F	6'2"	Junior	Aurora, CO	UAB
Knisha Godfrey	4	G	5'9"	(redshirt) Senior	Columbus, OH	TCU

=== 2025 recruiting class ===
College recruiting
Name	Hometown	School	Height	Weight	Commit date
Nyadieng Yiech; F	Calgary, AB	Fort Erie Secondary School	6 ft 1 in (1.85 m)	N/A	
Nyadieng Yiech; F	Recruit ratings: ESPN: (93)				
Overall recruit ranking:
Note: In many cases, Scout, Rivals, 247Sports, On3, and ESPN may conflict in their listings of height and weight.; In these cases, the average was taken. ESPN grades are on a 100-point scale.; Sources: "2025 Player Commits". ESPN. Archived from the original on August 12, 2025.

=== 2026 recruiting class ===
College recruiting (2026)
Name	Hometown	School	Height	Weight	Commit date
KK Holman; PG	Fishers, IN	Hamilton Southeastern High School	5 ft 10 in (1.78 m)	N/A	
KK Holman; PG	Recruit ratings: ESPN: (93)				
Overall recruit ranking:
Note: In many cases, Scout, Rivals, 247Sports, On3, and ESPN may conflict in their listings of height and weight.; In these cases, the average was taken. ESPN grades are on a 100-point scale.; Sources: "2026 Player Commits". ESPN. Archived from the original on August 12, 2025.

== Roster ==
2025–26 Florida Gators women's basketball team
Players
Coaches

Pos.	#	Name	Height	Year	Previous school	Hometown
G	0	Sarah Deng	5 ft 10 in (1.78 m)	Jr	AZ Compass Prep; Eastern Arizona College	Adelaide, Australia
F	1	Jade Weathersby	6 ft 2 in (1.88 m)	Jr	Brookwood HS; UAB	Aurora, CO
F	2	Nyadieng Yiech	6 ft 3 in (1.91 m)	Fr	Fort Erie International Academy (ON)	Calgary, AB
G	4	Knisha Godfrey	5 ft 9 in (1.75 m)	RS Sr	Tampa Bay Technical HS; TCU	Columbus, OH
G/F	7	Emilija Darkic	6 ft 4 in (1.93 m)	Fr	BA Centre of Excellence	Melbourne, Australia
G/F	8	Me'Arah O'Neal	6 ft 4 in (1.93 m)	So	Episcopal HS	Houston, TX
F	9	Alexia Dizeko	5 ft 11 in (1.8 m)	GS	ECCG de Martigny; South Georgia Technical College	Sion, Switzerland
G	12	Daviane Mindoudi Ongbakahoumb	6 ft 1 in (1.85 m)	So	Segle XXI	Bilbao, Spain
G	13	Laila Reynolds	6 ft 1 in (1.85 m)	Jr	Shabach Christian Academy	Prince George's County, MD
C	14	Caterina Piatti	6 ft 4 in (1.93 m)	Fr	Lupe San Martino Basketball Club	Scandiano, Italy
G	23	Liv McGill	5 ft 9 in (1.75 m)	So	Hopkins HS	Minneapolis, MN

Head coach

- Kelly Rae Finley (Colorado State)

Assistant coach(es)

- Jackie Moore (Armstrong State)
- Cynthia Jordan (Temple)
- Daniel Boice (Dordt)
- Fred Williams (Boise State)

Legend

- (C) Team captain
- (S) Suspended
- (I) Ineligible
- (W) Walk-on
- Injured
- Current redshirt

Roster

== Schedule and results ==
Date time, TV	Rank^{#}	Opponent^{#}	Result	Record	High points	High rebounds	High assists	Site (attendance) city, state
Non-conference regular season
November 3, 2025*; 7:00 p.m., SECN+/ESPN+		North Florida	W 96–62	1–0	26 – McGill	11 – O'Neal	9 – McGill	O'Connell Center (1,183); Gainesville, FL
November 6, 2025*; 5:00 p.m., SECN+/ESPN+		Chattanooga	W 94–52	2–0	38 – McGill	10 – O'Neal	10 – McGill	O'Connell Center (1,748); Gainesville, FL
November 10, 2025*; 7:00 p.m., SECN+/ESPN+		Jacksonville	W 100–55	3–0	20 – O'Neal	11 – O'Neal	3 – Tied	O'Connell Center (1,224); Gainesville, FL
November 13, 2025*; 7:00 p.m., SECN+/ESPN+		Samford	W 87–40	4–0	20 – McGill	6 – Reynolds	7 – McGill	O'Connell Center (1,238); Gainesville, FL
November 16, 2025*; 1:00 p.m., ESPN+		at Navy	L 54–69	4–1	19 – Reynolds	6 – O'Neal	5 – Reynolds	Alumni Hall (825); Annapolis, MD
November 20, 2025*; 6:30 p.m., SECN		Florida State; Rivalry	W 89–67	5–1	27 – McGill	11 – O'Neal	5 – Tied	O'Connell Center (1,746); Gainesville, FL
November 24, 2025*; 7:00 p.m., ESPN+		at Florida Atlantic	W 59–51	6–1	17 – Reynolds	10 – Piatti	4 – O'Neal	Eleanor R. Baldwin Arena (831); Boca Raton, FL
November 28, 2025*; 7:30 p.m., FloCollege		vs. Memphis; Cayman Islands Classic Little Brac Division	W 74–60	7–1	27 – McGill	9 – O'Neal	5 – Dizeko	John Gray Gymnasium (1,050); George Town, Cayman Islands
November 29, 2025*; 5:00 p.m., FloCollege		vs. Georgia Tech; Cayman Islands Classic Little Brac Division	W 65–56	8–1	27 – McGill	7 – O'Neal	6 – McGill	John Gray Gymnasium; George Town, Cayman Islands
December 4, 2025*; 5:00 p.m., ESPNU		at Virginia Tech; ACC–SEC Challenge	L 64–68	8–2	30 – McGill	6 – Tied	3 – McGill	Cassell Coliseum (4,118); Blacksburg, VA
December 7, 2025*; 2:00 p.m., SECN+/ESPN+		South Alabama	W 75–61	9–2	32 – McGill	10 – Yiech	4 – McGill	O'Connell Center (1,300); Gainesville, FL
December 14, 2025*; 2:00 p.m., SECN+/ESPN+		West Georgia	W 85–41	10–2	17 – O'Neal	10 – O'Neal	10 – McGill	O'Connell Center (1,363); Gainesville, FL
December 17, 2025*; 3:00 p.m., SECN+/ESPN+		Florida A&M	W 76–51	11–2	29 – McGill	11 – O'Neal	5 – Tied	O'Connell Center (957); Gainesville, FL
December 21, 2025*; 2:45 p.m., SECN+/ESPN+		Tulsa	L 67–74	11–3	18 – McGill	6 – Tied	9 – McGill	O'Connell Center (2,871); Gainesville, FL
December 28, 2025*; 2:00 p.m., SECN+/ESPN+		Furman	W 82–66	12–3	22 – O'Neal	8 – McGill	7 – McGill	O'Connell Center (1,375); Gainesville, FL
SEC regular season
January 1, 2026; 2:00 p.m., SECN+/ESPN+		at No. 23 Tennessee	L 65–76	12–4 (0–1)	32 – McGill	9 – O'Neal	3 – Reynolds	Thompson–Boling Arena (10,230); Knoxville, TN
January 4, 2026; 2:00 p.m., SECN		No. 3 South Carolina	L 63–74	12–5 (0–2)	18 – McGill	7 – McGill	3 – McGill	O'Connell Center (6,006); Gainesville, FL
January 8, 2026; 7:00 p.m., SECN+/ESPN+		Texas A&M	L 66–74	12–6 (0–3)	22 – Janneh	9 – Janneh	12 – Pryor	O'Connell Center (1,580); Gainesville, FL
January 11, 2026; 3:00 p.m., SECN+/ESPN+		at Auburn	L 50–60	12–7 (0–4)	14 – McGill	8 – O'Neal	4 – McGill	Neville Arena (4,095); Auburn, AL
January 15, 2026; 7:00 p.m., SECN+/ESPN+		at No. 7 Kentucky	L 89–94	12–8 (0–5)	23 – O'Neal	6 – Weathersby	11 – McGill	Memorial Coliseum (3,368); Lexington, KY
January 18, 2026; 2:00 p.m., SECN+/ESPN+		Missouri	W 89–71	13–8 (1–5)	28 – McGill	9 – McGill	7 – McGill	O'Connell Center (1,824); Gainesville, FL
January 26, 2026; 7:00 p.m., SECN		at No. 6 LSU	L 60–89	13–9 (1–6)	14 – McGill	8 – McGill	4 – McGill	Pete Maravich Assembly Center (9,793); Baton Rouge, LA
January 29, 2026; 7:00 p.m., SECN+/ESPN+		No. 4 Texas	L 68–88	13–10 (1–7)	18 – Reynolds	7 – McGill	8 – McGill	O'Connell Center (2,259); Gainesville, FL
February 1, 2026; 4:00 p.m., SECN		at No. 5 Vanderbilt; Play4Kay	L 66–82	13–11 (1–8)	22 – O'Neal	8 – O'Neal	5 – McGill	Memorial Gymnasium (9,268); Nashville, TN
February 5, 2026; 7:00 p.m., SECN+/ESPN+		Auburn	W 61–53	14–11 (2–8)	17 – Reynolds	12 – O'Neal	5 – McGill	O'Connell Center (1,752); Gainesville, FL
February 8, 2026; 1:00 p.m., SECN		Arkansas	W 75–69	15–11 (3–8)	25 – McGill	14 – McGill	8 – McGill	O'Connell Center (1,658); Gainesville, FL
February 12, 2026; 7:00 p.m., SECN+/ESPN+		at No. 10 Oklahoma	L 74–81	15–12 (3–9)	29 – McGill	7 – Tied	7 – McGill	Lloyd Noble Center (4,309); Norman, OK
February 19, 2026; 7:30 p.m., SECN+/ESPN+		at Mississippi State	W 71–56	16–12 (4–9)	30 – McGill	7 – O'Neal	7 – McGill	Humphrey Coliseum (3,582); Starkville, MS
February 22, 2026; 12:00 p.m., SECN		No. 25 Alabama	L 71–76	16–13 (4–10)	19 – McGill	8 – Weathersby	8 – McGill	O'Connell Center (2,351); Gainesville, FL
February 26, 2026; 6:00 p.m., SECN		No. 19 Ole Miss	W 74–67	17–13 (5–10)	28 – McGill	6 – Tied	8 – McGill	O'Connell Center (1,681); Gainesville, FL
March 1, 2026; 3:00 p.m., SECN+/ESPN+		at No. 23 Georgia	L 58–71	17–14 (5–11)	14 – Yiech	11 – Weathersby	9 – McGill	Stegeman Coliseum (3,432); Athens, GA
SEC Tournament
March 4, 2026; 1:30 p.m., SECN	(12)	vs. (13) Mississippi State; SEC Tournament first round	W 86–68	18–14	22 – Tied	7 – McGill	10 – McGill	Bon Secours Wellness Arena (10,322); Greenville, SC
March 5, 2026; 1:30 p.m., SECN	(12)	vs. (5) No. 7 Oklahoma; SEC Tournament second round	L 64–82	18–15	28 – McGill	8 – McGill	4 – McGill	Bon Secours Wellness Arena (6,928); Greenville, SC
*Non-conference game. ^{#}Rankings from AP Poll. (#) Tournament seedings in parentheses. All times are in Eastern Time. notes=

== See also ==
- 2025–26 Florida Gators men's basketball team
