= 2025–26 Texas Longhorns women's basketball team =

American college basketball season

2025–26 Texas Longhorns women's basketball

SEC tournament champions Players Era Festival champions

NCAA tournament, Final Four
- Conference: Southeastern Conference

Ranking
- Coaches: No. 4
- AP: No. 4
- Record: 35–4 (13–3 SEC)
- Head coach: Vic Schaefer (6th season)
- Associate head coach: Elena Lovato (4th season)
- Assistant coaches: Lindsay Wisdom-Hylton (4th season); Blair Schaefer (6th season); Sydney Carter (2nd season); Mason Wright (1st season)
- Home arena: Moody Center

2025–26 SEC women's basketball standings
	Conf.				Overall
Team	W		L	PCT	W		L	PCT
No. 2 South Carolina	15	–	1	.938	36	–	4	.900
No. 10 Vanderbilt	13	–	3	.813	29	–	5	.853
No. 4 Texas †	13	–	3	.813	35	–	4	.897
No. 8 LSU	12	–	4	.750	29	–	6	.829
No. 12 Oklahoma	11	–	5	.688	26	–	8	.765
Tennessee	8	–	8	.500	16	–	14	.533
No. 21 Ole Miss	8	–	8	.500	24	–	12	.667
Georgia	8	–	8	.500	22	–	10	.688
No. 14 Kentucky	8	–	8	.500	25	–	11	.694
Texas A&M	7	–	9	.438	14	–	13	.519
No. 24 Alabama	7	–	9	.438	24	–	11	.686
Florida	5	–	11	.313	18	–	15	.545
Mississippi State	5	–	11	.313	18	–	13	.581
Missouri	4	–	12	.250	17	–	17	.500
Auburn	3	–	13	.188	15	–	17	.469
Arkansas	1	–	15	.063	12	–	20	.375
† 2026 SEC tournament winner Rankings from AP poll

The 2025–26 Texas Longhorns women's basketball team represented the University of Texas at Austin in the 2025–26 NCAA Division I women's basketball season. The team, coached by sixth-year head coach Vic Schaefer, played their home games at the Moody Center as second-year members of the Southeastern Conference.

== Previous season ==
The Longhorns finished the 2024–25 season 35–4, 15–1 in SEC play to share the SEC regular season title with South Carolina. As the No. 2 seed in the SEC tournament, they defeated Ole Miss and LSU in the quarterfinals and semifinals before losing to South Carolina in the championship. They received an at-large bid to the NCAA tournament as the No. 1 seed in Birmingham Regional 3. They defeated No. 16 William & Mary and No. 8 Illinois in the first and second rounds, Tennessee in the Sweet Sixteen and TCU in the Elite Eight to advance to the Final Four for the first time since 2003, where they lost to South Carolina.

== Offseason ==
=== Departures ===
Name	Number	Pos.	Height	Year	Hometown	Reason for departure
Laila Phelia	5	G	6'0"	Senior	Cincinnati, OH	Transferred to Syracuse
Shay Holle	10	G	6'0"	Senior	Austin, TX	Graduated
Jordana Codio	13	G	6'1"	Junior	Jupiter, FL	Transferred to Seton Hall
Aaliyah Moore	23	F	6'1"	Senior	Moore, OK	Graduated
Ndjakalenga Mwenentanda	32	F	6'2"	Junior	Sioux Falls, SD	Transferred to Vanderbilt
Taylor Jones	44	F	6'4"	Senior	Forney, TX	Graduated
Abbie Boutilier	50	C	6'9"	Sophomore	Flower Mound, TX	Transferred to Eastern Illinois

==== Incoming transfers ====
Name	Num	Pos.	Height	Year	Hometown	Previous team
Lovisa Asbrink Hose	16	C	6'6"	Sophomore	Stockholm, Sweden	Florida Atlantic
Ashton Judd	21	G	6'1"	Senior	West Plains, MO	Missouri
Breya Cunningham	25	F	6'4"	Junior	Chula Vista, CA	Arizona
Teya Sidberry	32	F	6'1"	Senior	Salt Lake City, UT	Boston College

==== 2025 recruiting class ====
College recruiting
Name	Hometown	School	Height	Weight	Commit date
Aaliyah Crump; G	Minnetonka, MN	Montverde Academy	6 ft 1 in (1.85 m)	N/A	
Aaliyah Crump; G	Recruit ratings: ESPN: (97)				
Overall recruit ranking:
Note: In many cases, Scout, Rivals, 247Sports, On3, and ESPN may conflict in their listings of height and weight.; In these cases, the average was taken. ESPN grades are on a 100-point scale.; Sources: "2025 Player Commits". ESPN. Archived from the original on September 25, 2025.

==== 2026 recruiting class ====
College recruiting (2026)
Name	Hometown	School	Height	Weight	Commit date
Brihanna Crittendon; W	Thornton, CO	Riverdale Ridge High School	6 ft 3 in (1.91 m)	N/A	
Brihanna Crittendon; W	Recruit ratings: ESPN: (97)				
Addison Bjorn; W	Riverside, MO	Park Hill South High School	6 ft 1 in (1.85 m)	N/A	
Addison Bjorn; W	Recruit ratings: ESPN: (97)				
Aaliah Spaight; PG	Las Vegas, NV	Bishop Gorman High School	5 ft 7 in (1.70 m)	N/A	
Aaliah Spaight; PG	Recruit ratings: ESPN: (95)				
Amalia Holguin; G	Newport Beach, CA	Sage Hill High School	5 ft 9 in (1.75 m)	N/A	
Amalia Holguin; G	Recruit ratings: ESPN: (93)				
Overall recruit ranking:
Note: In many cases, Scout, Rivals, 247Sports, On3, and ESPN may conflict in their listings of height and weight.; In these cases, the average was taken. ESPN grades are on a 100-point scale.; Sources: "2026 Player Commits". ESPN. Archived from the original on February 28, 2026.

== Roster ==
2025–26 Texas Longhorns women's basketball team
Players
Coaches

Pos.	#	Name	Height	Year	Previous school	Hometown
F	00	Kyla Oldacre	6 ft 6 in (1.98 m)	Sr	Miami	Mason, OH
G	1	Bryanna Preston	5 ft 9 in (1.75 m)	So	Wesleyan	Jonesboro, GA
PG	3	Rori Harmon	5 ft 6 in (1.68 m)	GS	Cypress Creek	Houston, TX
G	6	Sarah Graves (W)	5 ft 9 in (1.75 m)	Sr	Keller	Keller, TX
G	7	Jordan Lee	6 ft 0 in (1.83 m)	So	St. Mary's	Stockton, CA
G	8	Grace Prenter	5 ft 8 in (1.73 m)	Fr	Mount Anville Secondary	Dublin, Ireland
F	11	Justice Carlton	6 ft 1 in (1.85 m)	So	Seven Lakes	Katy, TX
C	16	Lovisa Asbrink Hose	6 ft 6 in (1.98 m)	So	Florida Atlantic	Stockholm, Sweden
G	21	Ashton Judd	6 ft 1 in (1.85 m)	Sr	Missouri	West Plains, MO
G	23	Aaliyah Crump	6 ft 1 in (1.85 m)	Fr	Minnetonka	Shakopee, MN
F	25	Breya Cunningham	6 ft 4 in (1.93 m)	Jr	Arizona	Chula Vista, CA
F	32	Teya Sidberry	6 ft 1 in (1.85 m)	Sr	Boston College	Salt Lake City, UT
F	35	Madison Booker	6 ft 1 in (1.85 m)	Jr	Germantown	Ridgeland, MS

Head coach

- Vic Schaefer (Texas A&M)

Assistant coach(es)

- Elena Lovato (Pittsburg State)
- Lindsay Wisdom-Hylton (Purdue)
- Blair Schaefer (Mississippi State)
- Sydney Carter (Texas A&M)
- Mason Wright (Texas)

Legend

- (C) Team captain
- (S) Suspended
- (I) Ineligible
- (W) Walk-on
- Injured
- Current redshirt

Roster

== Schedule and results ==
Date time, TV	Rank^{#}	Opponent^{#}	Result	Record	High points	High rebounds	High assists	Site (attendance) city, state
Exhibition
October 23, 2025*; 7:00 p.m.	No. 4	Lubbock Christian	W 102–44		25 – Carlton	12 – Booker	11 – Harmon	Moody Center; Austin, TX
October 27, 2025*; 7:00 p.m.	No. 4	Texas Woman's	W 108–54		25 – Cunningham	9 – Cunningham	12 – Harmon	Moody Center; Austin, TX
Non-conference regular season
November 3, 2025*; 7:00 p.m., SECN+/ESPN+	No. 4	Incarnate Word	W 123–51	1–0	21 – Lee	8 – Cunningham	5 – Harmon	Moody Center (8,882); Austin, TX
November 7, 2025*; 7:00 p.m., SECN+/ESPN+	No. 4	No. 24т Richmond	W 85–56	2–0	22 – Booker	12 – Booker	6 – Harmon	Moody Center (8,747); Austin, TX
November 10, 2025*; 7:00 p.m., SECN+/ESPN+	No. 4	Louisiana	W 100–38	3–0	19 – Oldacre	14 – Cunningham	5 – Tied	Moody Center (8,677); Austin, TX
November 16, 2025*; 4:00 p.m., SECN+/ESPN+	No. 4	Texas Southern	W 111–45	4–0	18 – Tied	9 – Oldacre	4 – Tied	Moody Center (8,699); Austin, TX
November 19, 2025*; 7:00 p.m., SECN+/ESPN+	No. 4	James Madison	W 95–56	5–0	18 – Booker	8 – Cunningham	12 – Harmon	Moody Center (8,598); Austin, TX
November 26, 2025*; 1:00 p.m., TruTV	No. 4	vs. No. 3 UCLA; Players Era Festival semifinals	W 76–65	6–0	26 – Harmon	7 – Booker	5 – Tied	Michelob Ultra Arena; Paradise, NV
November 27, 2025*; 7:00 p.m., TruTV	No. 4	vs. No. 2 South Carolina; Players Era Festival Championship Game	W 66–64	7–0	19 – Lee	9 – Booker	9 – Harmon	Michelob Ultra Arena; Paradise, NV
November 30, 2025*; 2:00 p.m., SECN+/ESPN+	No. 4	Penn	W 81–63	8–0	17 – Booker	12 – Sidberry	4 – Harmon	Moody Center (8,692); Austin, TX
December 4, 2025*; 6:00 p.m., ESPN2	No. 2	No. 11 North Carolina; ACC–SEC Challenge	W 79–64	9–0	17 – Nivar	8 – Toomey	3 – Nivar	Moody Center (9,020); Austin, TX
December 7, 2025*; 2:00 p.m., SECN+/ESPN+	No. 2	Prairie View A&M	W 101–42	10–0	30 – Cunningham	14 – Cunningham	10 – Harmon	Moody Center (8,727); Austin, TX
December 10, 2025*; 6:30 p.m., ESPN+	No. 2	at UT Rio Grande Valley	W 110–45	11–0	28 – Booker	10 – Booker	14 – Harmon	Bert Ogden Arena (5,984); Edinburg, TX
December 14, 2025*; 12:00 p.m., ABC	No. 2	vs. No. 13 Baylor; Sprouts Farmers Market espnW Invitational	W 89–54	12–0	27 – Booker	8 – Booker	10 – Harmon	Dickies Arena (3,116); Fort Worth, TX
December 17, 2025*; 8:00 p.m., SECN	No. 2	Northwestern State	W 96–38	13–0	28 – Booker	12 – Oldacre	10 – Harmon	Moody Center (8,471); Austin, TX
December 21, 2025*; 2:00 p.m., CBSSN	No. 2	at South Dakota State	W 70–51	14–0	17 – Lee	9 – Booker	7 – Harmon	First Bank and Trust Arena (3,878); Brookings, SD
December 28, 2025*; 1:00 p.m., SECN	No. 2	Southeastern Louisiana	W 120–38	15–0	22 – Oldacre	10 – Cunningham	6 – Harmon	Moody Center (9,378); Austin, TX
SEC regular season
January 1, 2026; 6:30 p.m., SECN+/ESPN+	No. 2	at Missouri	W 89–71	16–0 (1–0)	28 – Booker	10 – Booker	5 – Harmon	Mizzou Arena (3,917); Columbia, MO
January 4, 2026; 2:00 p.m., ESPN2	No. 2	No. 15 Ole Miss	W 67–64	17–0 (2–0)	17 – Lee	6 – Booker	10 – Harmon	Moody Center (10,113); Austin, TX
January 8, 2026; 7:00 p.m., SECN+/ESPN+	No. 2	Auburn	W 97–36	18–0 (3–0)	23 – Oldacre	11 – Oldacre	7 – Harmon	Moody Center (8,929); Austin, TX
January 11, 2026; 2:00 p.m., ESPN	No. 2	at No. 12 LSU; We Back Pat	L 65–70	18–1 (3–1)	24 – Booker	16 – Oldacre	3 – Harmon	Pete Maravich Assembly Center (13,200); Baton Rouge, LA
January 15, 2026; 6:00 p.m., ESPN2	No. 4	at No. 2 South Carolina	L 65−68	18−2 (3−2)	24 – Booker	7 – Carlton	5 – Harmon	Colonial Life Arena (17,188); Columbia, SC
January 18, 2026; 3:00 p.m., SECN	No. 4	Texas A&M; Lone Star Showdown	W 80–35	19–2 (4–2)	12 – Crump	18 – Oldacre	6 – Booker	Moody Center (10,331); Austin, TX
January 25, 2026; 3:00 p.m., SECN	No. 4	at Arkansas	Game postponed to Feb. 19 due to winter storm					Bud Walton Arena; Fayetteville, AR
January 29, 2026; 6:00 p.m., SECN+/ESPN+	No. 4	at Florida	W 88–68	20–2 (5–2)	24 – Booker	6 – Tied	5 – Harmon	O'Connell Center (2,259); Gainesville, FL
February 1, 2026; 2:00 p.m., ABC	No. 4	No. 10 Oklahoma	W 78–70	21–2 (6–2)	16 – Tied	8 – Carlton	6 – Harmon	Moody Center (10,155); Austin, TX
February 5, 2026; 8:00 p.m., ESPN	No. 4	No. 5 LSU	W 77–64	22–2 (7–2)	18 – Booker	8 – Cunningham	5 – Harmon	Moody Center (10,406); Austin, TX
February 9, 2026; 6:30 p.m., SECN	No. 4	No. 18 Kentucky	W 64–53	23–2 (8–2)	17 – Carlton	6 – Oldacre	4 – Booker	Moody Center (9,572); Austin, TX
February 12, 2026; 6:30 p.m., SECN+/ESPN+	No. 4	at No. 5 Vanderbilt	L 70–86	23–3 (8–3)	20 – Booker	8 – Booker	7 – Preston	Memorial Gymnasium (5,173); Nashville, TN
February 15, 2026; 2:00 p.m., ABC	No. 4	at No. 22 Tennessee	W 65–63	24–3 (9–3)	14 – Booker	7 – Cunningham	4 – Booker	Thompson–Boling Arena (13,351); Knoxville, TN
February 19, 2026; 6:30 p.m., SECN+/ESPN+	No. 4	at Arkansas; Rescheduled from Jan. 25	W 93–62	25–3 (10–3)	21 – Booker	10 – Oldacre	7 – Tied	Bud Walton Arena (2,828); Fayetteville, AR
February 22, 2026; 1:00 p.m., SECN	No. 4	Mississippi State	W 92–42	26–3 (11–3)	23 – Booker	12 – Cunningham	11 – Harmon	Moody Center (10,705); Austin, TX
February 26, 2026; 9:00 p.m., SECN	No. 4	No. 23 Georgia	W 79–50	27–3 (12–3)	18 – Booker	6 – Cunningham	7 – Harmon	Moody Center (10,136); Austin, TX
March 1, 2026; 11:00 a.m., SECN	No. 4	at No. 24 Alabama	W 72–65	28–3 (13–3)	21 – Booker	9 – Tied	5 – Lee	Coleman Coliseum (2,891); Tuscaloosa, AL
SEC tournament
March 6, 2026; 7:30 p.m., SECN	(3) No. 4	vs. (11) Alabama; Quarterfinals	W 83–60	29–3	16 – Lee	10 – Booker	6 – Booker	Bon Secours Wellness Arena; Greenville, SC
March 6, 2026; 7:30 p.m., ESPN2	(3) No. 4	vs. (7) No. 24 Ole Miss; Semifinals	W 85–68	30–3	31 – Booker	11 – Booker	7 – Harmon	Bon Secours Wellness Arena (13,333); Greenville, SC
March 7, 2026; 2:00 p.m., ESPN	(3) No. 4	vs. (1) No. 3 South Carolina; Championship	W 78–61	31–3	18 – Booker	8 – Cunningham	4 – Tied	Bon Secours Wellness Arena (13,567); Greenville, SC
NCAA tournament
March 20, 2026*; 3:00 p.m., ESPN	(1 FW3) No. 3	(16 FW3) Missouri State; First Round	W 87–45	32–3	19 – Lee	12 – Booker	4 – Preston	Moody Center (7,938); Austin, TX
March 22, 2026*; 5:00 p.m., ESPN	(1 FW3) No. 3	(8 FW3) Oregon; Second Round	W 100–58	33–3	40 – Booker	8 – Booker	6 – Harmon	Moody Center (8,981); Austin, TX
March 28, 2026*; 2:00 p.m., ABC	(1 FW3) No. 3	vs. (5 FW3) No. 16 Kentucky; Sweet Sixteen	W 76–54	34–3	18 – Lee	8 – Booker	7 – Harmon	Dickies Arena (11,197); Fort Worth, TX
March 30, 2026*; 6:00 p.m., ESPN	(1 FW3) No. 3	vs. (2 FW3) No. 9 Michigan; Elite Eight	W 77–41	35–3	19 – Booker	11 – Oldacre	13 – Harmon	Dickies Arena (9,354); Fort Worth, TX
April 3, 2026*; 8:30 p.m., ESPN	(1 FW3) No. 3	vs. (1 S2) No. 2 UCLA; Final Four	L 44–51	35–4	11 – Oldacre	7 – Tied	5 – Harmon	Mortgage Matchup Center (15,856); Phoenix, AZ
*Non-conference game. ^{#}Rankings from AP Poll. (#) Tournament seedings in parentheses. FW3=Fort Worth 3. S2=Sacramento 2. All times are in Central Time.

== Rankings ==
Ranking movements Legend: ██ Increase in ranking ██ Decrease in ranking ( ) = First-place votes
	Week																				
Poll	Pre	1	2	3	4	5	6	7	8	9	10	11	12	13	14	15	16	17	18	19	Final
AP	4	4	4	4	2 (10)	2 (9)	2 (8)	2 (7)	2 (7)*	2 (4)	4	4	4	4	4	4	4	4	3	3	4
Coaches	3	3	4	4	2 (3)	2 (3)	2 (3)	2 (3)	2 (3)	2 (3)	4	5	4	4	4	4	4	4	3	3	4

*AP did not release a week 8 poll.

== See also ==
- 2025–26 Texas Longhorns men's basketball team
