= 2025–26 Missouri Tigers women's basketball team =

Intercollegiate basketball season

2025–26 Missouri Tigers women's basketball

Fort Myers Tip-Off Shell Division champions

WBIT, Second Round
- Conference: Southeastern Conference
- Record: 17–17 (4–12 SEC)
- Head coach: Kellie Harper (1st season)
- Assistant coaches: Jennifer Sullivan; Kenzie Kostas; Liza Fruendt; Todd Schaefer; Michael Scruggs
- Home arena: Mizzou Arena

2025–26 SEC women's basketball standings
	Conf.				Overall
Team	W		L	PCT	W		L	PCT
No. 2 South Carolina	15	–	1	.938	36	–	4	.900
No. 10 Vanderbilt	13	–	3	.813	29	–	5	.853
No. 4 Texas †	13	–	3	.813	35	–	4	.897
No. 8 LSU	12	–	4	.750	29	–	6	.829
No. 12 Oklahoma	11	–	5	.688	26	–	8	.765
Tennessee	8	–	8	.500	16	–	14	.533
No. 21 Ole Miss	8	–	8	.500	24	–	12	.667
Georgia	8	–	8	.500	22	–	10	.688
No. 14 Kentucky	8	–	8	.500	25	–	11	.694
Texas A&M	7	–	9	.438	14	–	13	.519
No. 24 Alabama	7	–	9	.438	24	–	11	.686
Florida	5	–	11	.313	18	–	15	.545
Mississippi State	5	–	11	.313	18	–	13	.581
Missouri	4	–	12	.250	17	–	17	.500
Auburn	3	–	13	.188	15	–	17	.469
Arkansas	1	–	15	.063	12	–	20	.375
† 2026 SEC tournament winner Rankings from AP poll

The 2025–26 Missouri Tigers women's basketball team represented the University of Missouri during the 2025–26 NCAA Division I women's basketball season. The Tigers, led by first-year head coach Kellie Harper, play their home games at Mizzou Arena and compete as members of the Southeastern Conference (SEC).

== Previous season ==
The Tigers finished the season 14–18, 3–13 in SEC play to finish in a four-way for last place in the SEC. As a No. 15 seed in the SEC Tournament, they lost in the first round to Mississippi State.

Pingeton announced her resignation on February 26, 2025, after 15 seasons at Mizzou, effective at the conclusion of the season. Under Pingeton, the Tigers went 250–218, with 4fourNCAA tournament appearances. Kellie Harper, most recently head coach at her alma mater Tennessee, was hired as her replacement on March 18.

== Offseason ==
=== Departures ===
Missouri departures
Name	Number	Pos.	Height	Year	Hometown	Reason for departure
De'Myla Brown	1	G	5'7"	Graduate student	North Little Rock, AR	Graduated
Londyn Oliphant	2	G	5'6"	Freshman	Dallas, TX	Transferred to Incarnate Word
Laniah Randle	4	F	5'11"	Senior	Wichita, KS	Transferred
Hilke Feldrappe	5	F	6'3"	Sophomore	Berlin, Germany	Transferred to Columbia
Tilda Sjökvist	6	G	5'7"	Junior	Huskvarna, Sweden	Transferred to Towson
Lucija Milkovic	7	C	6'6"	Sophomore	Šibenik, Croatia	Transferred to Seattle
Nyah Wilson	8	G	5'8"	Senior	Dallas, TX	Graduated
Tionna Herron	11	C	6'4"	Sophomore	DeSoto, TX	Retired from basketball due to injury
Ashton Judd	24	G	6'1"	Junior	West Plains, MO	Transferred to Texas

=== Incoming transfers ===
Missouri incoming transfers
Name	Number	Pos.	Height	Year	Hometown	Previous school
Shannon Dowell	1	G	5'10"	Junior	O'Fallon, IL	Illinois State
Saniah Tyler	2	G	5'6"	Senior	Florissant, MO	Kentucky
Lisa Thompson	4	G	5'9"	Junior	Joliet, IL	Rutgers
Jordana Reisma	10	F	6'3"	Senior	Brown Deer, WI	Cleveland State
Jayla Smith	11	G	6'0"	Graduate student	Indianapolis, IN	Purdue
Chloe Sotell	22	G	6'0"	Sophomore	Stamford, CT	Pepperdine
Sydney Mains	24	G	5'10"	Sophomore	Knoxville, TN	Florida Atlantic

=== 2025 recruiting class ===
There was no recruiting class of 2025.

== Roster ==
2025–26 Missouri Tigers women's basketball team
Players
Coaches

Pos.	#	Name	Height	Year	Previous school	Hometown
G	0	Grace Slaughter	6 ft 2 in (1.88 m)	Jr	Grain Valley HS	Grain Valley, MO
G	1	Shannon Dowell	5 ft 10 in (1.78 m)	Jr	O'Fallon HS; Illinois State	O'Fallon, IL
G	2	Saniah Tyler	5 ft 6 in (1.68 m)	Sr	Incarnate Word Academy; Kentucky	Florissant, MO
G	4	Lisa Thompson	5 ft 9 in (1.75 m)	Jr	Example Academy; Rutgers	Joliet, IL
F	10	Jordana Reisma	6 ft 3 in (1.91 m)	Sr	Brown Deer HS; Cleveland State	Brown Deer, WI
G	11	Jayla Smith	6 ft 0 in (1.83 m)	GS	Lawrence North HS; Purdue	Indianapolis, Indiana
F	12	Ma'Riya Vincent	6 ft 0 in (1.83 m)	RS Fr	Cypress Spring HS	Houston, TX
G	21	Averi Kroenke	5 ft 11 in (1.8 m)	RS Jr	Rock Bridge HS	Columbia, MO
G	22	Chloe Sotell	6 ft 0 in (1.83 m)	So	Montverde Academy; Pepperdine	Stamford, CT
G	23	Abbey Schreacke	6 ft 0 in (1.83 m)	Jr	Quincy Notre Dame HS	Quincy, IL
G	24	Sydney Mains	5 ft 10 in (1.78 m)	So	Knoxville Catholic HS; Florida Atlantic	Knoxville, TN
F	34	Hannah Linthacum	6 ft 4 in (1.93 m)	Jr	Jefferson City HS	Jefferson City, MO

Head coach

- Kellie Harper (Tennessee)

Assistant coach(es)

- Jennifer Sullivan (Memphis)
- Kenzie Kostas (Missouri State)
- Liza Fruendt (Missouri State)
- Todd Schaefer (Thomas More)
- Michael Scruggs (Tennessee)

Legend

- (C) Team captain
- (S) Suspended
- (I) Ineligible
- (W) Walk-on
- Injured
- Current redshirt

Roster

== Schedule and results ==
Date time, TV	Rank^{#}	Opponent^{#}	Result	Record	High points	High rebounds	High assists	Site (attendance) city, state
Exhibition
October 28, 2025*; 6:30 p.m.		Maryville	L 84–90		25 – Slaughter	11 – Tied	3 – Slaughter	Mizzou Arena; Columbia, MO
Non-conference regular season
November 3, 2025*; 6:30 p.m., SECN+/ESPN+		Central Arkansas	W 78–71	1–0	21 – Dowell	13 – Reisma	2 – Tied	Mizzou Arena (2,402); Columbia, MO
November 6, 2025*; 6:30 p.m., ESPN+		at Tulane	W 77–69	2–0	27 – Slaughter	12 – Dowell	6 – Slaughter	Devlin Fieldhouse (879); New Orleans, LA
November 11, 2025*; 6:30 p.m., SECN+/ESPN+		Arkansas State	W 97–75	3–0	25 – Slaughter	15 – Reisma	5 – Dowell	Mizzou Arena (2,625); Columbia, MO
November 15, 2025*; 6:00 p.m., ESPN+		vs. Kansas; Border War/StorageMart Border Showdown	L 77–82	3–1	18 – Dowell	7 – Slaughter	3 – Sotell	T-Mobile Center; Kansas City, MO
November 18, 2025*; 6:30 p.m., SECN+/ESPN+		Southern Illinois	W 81–50	4–1	30 – Dowell	6 – Slaughter	3 – Tied	Mizzou Arena (2,553); Columbia, MO
November 20, 2025*; 11:30 a.m., SECN+/ESPN+		Troy	L 82–100	4–2	25 – Dowell	7 – Sotell	5 – Dowell	Mizzou Arena (5,608); Columbia, MO
November 23, 2025*; 2:00 p.m., ESPN+		vs. Washington State; WBCA Showcase	W 71–54	5–2	20 – Dowell	10 – Dowell	5 – Sotell	State Farm Field House (523); Bay Lake, FL
November 28, 2025*; 12:30 p.m., Ion		vs. Bradley; Fort Myers Tip-Off Shell Division	W 73–66	6–2	19 – Slaughter	14 – Slaughter	5 – Reisma	Suncoast Credit Union Arena (821); Fort Myers, FL
November 29, 2025*; 12:30 p.m., Ion		vs. Northwestern; Fort Myers Tip-Off Shell Division	W 85–70	7–2	33 – Slaughter	13 – Dowell	5 – Slaughter	Suncoast Credit Union Arena (593); Fort Myers, FL
December 4, 2025*; 8:00 p.m., SECN		California; ACC–SEC Challenge	W 68–67	8–2	24 – Slaughter	10 – Slaughter	3 – Sotell	Mizzou Arena (2,892); Columbia, MO
December 7, 2025*; 2:00 p.m., SECN+/ESPN+		SIU Edwardsville	W 65–56	9–2	17 – Reisma	6 – Slaughter	3 – Smith	Mizzou Arena (3,118); Columbia, MO
December 10, 2025*; 6:00 p.m., SECN		Illinois; Braggin' Rights	L 62–70	9–3	19 – Slaughter	10 – Slaughter	4 – Thompson	Mizzou Arena; Columbia, MO
December 14, 2025*; 2:00 p.m., ESPN+		vs. Saint Louis	W 82–66	10–3	16 – Tied	8 – Sotell	5 – Dowell	Mark Twain Building (1,506); St. Louis, MO
December 21, 2025*; 12:00 p.m., SECN+/ESPN+		North Alabama	W 84–57	11–3	25 – Slaughter	13 – Sotell	6 – Tyler	Mizzou Arena (2,856); Columbia, MO
December 28, 2025*; 2:00 p.m., SECN+/ESPN+		Kansas City	W 71–67 ^{OT}	12–3	23 – Sotell	13 – Reisma	6 – Slaughter	Mizzou Arena (2,950); Columbia, MO
SEC regular season
January 1, 2026; 6:30 p.m., SECN+/ESPN+		No. 2 Texas	L 71–89	12–4 (0–1)	20 – Slaughter	6 – Sotell	4 – Thompson	Mizzou Arena (3,917); Columbia, MO
January 4, 2026; 11:00 a.m., SECN		at No. 11 Kentucky	L 52–74	12–5 (0–2)	15 – Slaughter	12 – Sotell	2 – Tied	Memorial Coliseum (4,534); Lexington, KY
January 8, 2026; 6:30 p.m., SECN+/ESPN+		at No. 7 Vanderbilt	L 68–99	12–6 (0–3)	19 – Schreacke	10 – Slaughter	5 – Thompson	Memorial Gymnasium (3,141); Nashville, TN
January 12, 2026; 6:00 p.m., SECN		No. 21 Alabama; We Back Pat	L 63−74	12−7 (0−4)	23 – Slaughter	9 – Slaughter	4 – Dowell	Mizzou Arena (2,747); Columbia, MO
January 15, 2026; 6:30 p.m., SECN+/ESPN+		Arkansas	W 94–69	13–7 (1–4)	21 – Reisma	12 – Slaughter	7 – Sotell	Mizzou Arena (2,715); Columbia, MO
January 18, 2026; 1:00 p.m., SECN+/ESPN+		at Florida	L 71–89	13–8 (1–5)	29 – Slaughter	5 – Slaughter	4 – Tyler	O'Connell Center (1,824); Gainesville, FL
January 22, 2026; 6:30 p.m., SECN+/ESPN+		No. 18 Ole Miss	L 61–82	13–9 (1–6)	21 – Slaughter	7 – Slaughter	2 – Tied	Mizzou Arena (2,862); Columbia, MO
January 25, 2026; 5:00 p.m., SECN		Texas A&M	W 81–70	14–9 (2–6)	24 – Slaughter	9 – Dowell	3 – Tied	Mizzou Arena (2,976); Columbia, MO
February 1, 2026; 2:00 p.m., SECN+/ESPN+		at Mississippi State	W 88–80	15–9 (3–6)	21 – Dowell	6 – Dowell	5 – Dowell	Humphrey Coliseum (4,214); Starkville, MS
February 5, 2026; 6:30 p.m., SECN+/ESPN+		at Arkansas	W 87–82	16–9 (4–6)	25 – Dowell	10 – Sotell	5 – Sotell	Bud Walton Arena (3,968); Tuscaloosa, AL
February 8, 2026; 3:00 p.m., SECN		Georgia	L 66–85	16–10 (4–7)	16 – Dowell	8 – Slaughter	2 – Tyler	Mizzou Arena (3,968); Columbia, MO
February 12, 2026; 5:30 p.m., SECN+/ESPN+		at No. 22 Tennessee	L 53–98	16–11 (4–8)	20 – Slaughter	5 – Tied	2 – Tied	Thompson–Boling Arena (10,489); Knoxville, TN
February 19, 2026; 6:30 p.m., SECN+/ESPN+		Auburn; Play4Kay	L 58–71	16–12 (4–9)	19 – Slaughter	7 – Reisma	3 – Tied	Mizzou Arena (2,804); Columbia, MO
February 22, 2026; 3:00 p.m., SECN		at No. 7 LSU	L 55–108	16–13 (4–10)	14 – Slaughter	7 – Sotell	2 – Tied	Pete Maravich Assembly Center (11,278); Baton Rouge, LA
February 26, 2026; 7:00 p.m., SECN		at No. 3 South Carolina	L 71–112	16–14 (4–11)	21 – Slaughter	5 – Tied	3 – Tied	Colonial Life Arena (15,526); Columbia, SC
March 1, 2026; 3:00 p.m., SECN+/ESPN+		No. 7 Oklahoma	L 78–84	16–15 (4–12)	33 – Dowell	10 – Dowell	5 – Reisma	Mizzou Arena (3,586); Columbia, MO
SEC Tournament
March 4, 2026; 7:30 p.m., SECN	(14)	vs. (11) Alabama; First Round	L 48–65	16–16	15 – Reisma	11 – Slaughter	3 – Sotell	Bon Secours Wellness Arena (5,072); Greenville, SC
WBIT
March 19, 2026*; 7:00 p.m., ESPN+	(4)	at Seton Hall; First Round	W 67–57	17–16	22 – Slaughter	11 – Sotell	5 – Tied	Walsh Gymnasium (453); South Orange, NJ
March 23, 2026*; 9:00 p.m., ESPN+	(4)	at (1) BYU; Second Round	L 75–93	17–17	17 – Tied	8 – Slaughter	3 – Slaughter	Marriott Center (2,415); Prove, UT
*Non-conference game. ^{#}Rankings from AP Poll. (#) Tournament seedings in parentheses. All times are in Central Time.

== See also ==
- 2025–26 Missouri Tigers men's basketball team
