= 2025–26 Tennessee Lady Volunteers basketball team =

Intercollegiate basketball season

2025–26 Tennessee Lady Volunteers basketball
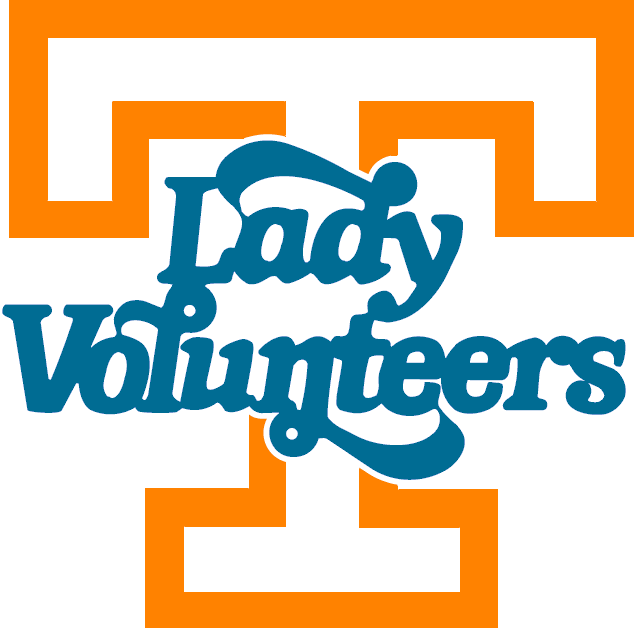

NCAA tournament, first round
- Conference: Southeastern Conference
- Record: 16–14 (8–8 SEC)
- Head coach: Kim Caldwell (2nd season)
- Assistant coaches: Roman Tubner; Gabe Lazo; Jenna Burdette
- Home arena: Thompson–Boling Arena

2025–26 SEC women's basketball standings
	Conf.				Overall
Team	W		L	PCT	W		L	PCT
No. 4 South Carolina	15	–	1	.938	36	–	3	.923
No. 6 Vanderbilt	13	–	3	.813	29	–	5	.853
No. 3 Texas †	13	–	3	.813	35	–	4	.897
No. 5 LSU	12	–	4	.750	29	–	6	.829
No. 10 Oklahoma	11	–	5	.688	26	–	8	.765
Tennessee	8	–	8	.500	16	–	14	.533
No. 19 Ole Miss	8	–	8	.500	24	–	12	.667
No. 24 Georgia	8	–	8	.500	22	–	10	.688
No. 16 Kentucky	8	–	8	.500	25	–	11	.694
Texas A&M	7	–	9	.438	14	–	13	.519
Alabama	7	–	9	.438	24	–	11	.686
Florida	5	–	11	.313	18	–	15	.545
Mississippi State	5	–	11	.313	18	–	13	.581
Missouri	4	–	12	.250	17	–	17	.500
Auburn	3	–	13	.188	15	–	17	.469
Arkansas	1	–	15	.063	12	–	20	.375
† 2026 SEC tournament winner As of April 3, 2026; Rankings from AP poll

The 2025–26 Tennessee Lady Volunteers basketball team represented the University of Tennessee in the 2025–26 college basketball season. Led by head coach Kim Caldwell in her second year, the team played their games at Thompson–Boling Arena and is a member of the Southeastern Conference.

The Lady Vols finished the season with a 16–14 overall record, 8–8 in the conference. In the postseason, they lost in the second round of the SEC tournament to rival Alabama. They earned an at-large bid to the NCAA tournament but lost in the first round to NC State.

== Previous season ==
Following Caldwell's hiring in April 2024, the 2024–25 team went undefeated in non-conference play, achieving a Top 15 national ranking. However, other SEC teams ranked well, and the team finished the season with a 24–10 overall record, 8–8 in the conference. In the postseason, they lost in the second round of the SEC tournament to in-state rival Vanderbilt. They earned an at-large bid to the NCAA tournament, advancing to the Sweet Sixteen before losing to SEC foe Texas.

== Offseason ==
=== Departures ===
Departures
Name	Number	Pos.	Height	Year	Hometown	Reason for departure
Jewel Spear	0	G	5'10"	Graduate Student	The Colony, TX	Graduated
Sara Puckett	1	G/F	6'2"	Senior	Muscle Shoals, AL	Graduated
Samara Spencer	7	G	5'7"	Senior	Fort Lauderdale, FL	Graduated
Destinee Wells	10	G	5'6"	(redshirt) Senior	Lakeland, TN	Transferred to UT Martin
Edie Darby	12	G	5'7"	Junior	Greenfield, TN	Walk-on; retired from basketball due to a foot injury
Avery Strickland	13	G/F	5'10"	Junior	Knoxville, TN	Transferred to Belmont
Fayor Ayodele	15	F	6'1"	Graduate Student	Móstoles, Spain	Transferred to Grand Canyon
Tess Darby	21	G/F	6'1"	Graduate Student	Greenfield, TN	Graduated
Jillian Hollingshead	53	F	6'5"	Senior	Gainesville, GA	Graduated

=== Incoming transfers ===
Incoming transfers
Name	Number	Pos.	Height	Year	Hometown	Previous school
Janiah Barker	0	F	6'4"	Senior	Marietta, GA	UCLA
Nya Robertson	1	G	5'7"	Senior	Fort Worth, TX	SMU
Jersey Wolfenbarger	8	G/F	6'5"	Senior	Fort Smith, AR	LSU

=== Recruiting classes ===
==== 2025 recruiting class ====
College recruiting information
Name	Hometown	School	Height	Weight	Commit date
Mia Pauldo; PG	Denville, NJ	Morris Catholic High School	5 ft 5 in (1.65 m)	N/A	
Mia Pauldo; PG	Recruit ratings: 247Sports: ESPN: (97)				
Deniya Prawl; W	Toronto, ON	IMG Academy	6 ft 1 in (1.85 m)	N/A	
Deniya Prawl; W	Recruit ratings: 247Sports: ESPN: (97)				
Jaida Civil; G	Vero Beach, FL	Palm Bay Magnet High School	6 ft 0 in (1.83 m)	N/A	
Jaida Civil; G	Recruit ratings: 247Sports: ESPN: (95)				
Lauren Hurst; W	Cleveland, TN	Cleveland High School	6 ft 2 in (1.88 m)	N/A	
Lauren Hurst; W	Recruit ratings: 247Sports: ESPN: (94)				
Mya Pauldo; PG	Denville, NJ	Morris Catholic High School	5 ft 5 in (1.65 m)	N/A	
Mya Pauldo; PG	Recruit ratings: 247Sports: ESPN: (94)				
Overall recruit ranking:
Note: In many cases, Scout, Rivals, 247Sports, On3, and ESPN may conflict in their listings of height and weight.; In these cases, the average was taken. ESPN grades are on a 100-point scale.; Sources: "2025 Player Commits". ESPN. Archived from the original on January 27, 2025.

== Roster ==
2025–26 Tennessee Lady Volunteers women's basketball team
Players
Coaches

Pos.	#	Name	Height	Year	Previous school	Hometown
F	0	Janiah Barker	6 ft 4 in (1.93 m)	Sr	UCLA	Marietta, GA
G	1	Nya Robertson	5 ft 7 in (1.7 m)	Sr	SMU	Fort Worth, TX
G	4	Kaniya Boyd	5 ft 9 in (1.75 m)	RS So	Centennial HS	Las Vegas, NV
G	7	Lauren Hurst	6 ft 2 in (1.88 m)	Fr	Cleveland HS	Cleveland, TN
F	8	Jersey Wolfenbarger	6 ft 5 in (1.96 m)	Sr	LSU	Fort Smith, AR
F	11	Zee Spearman	6 ft 4 in (1.93 m)	Sr	University of Miami	Dacula, GA
G	12	Mya Pauldo	5 ft 6 in (1.68 m)	Fr	Morris Catholic HS	Paterson, NJ
G	13	Mia Pauldo	5 ft 6 in (1.68 m)	Fr	Morris Catholic HS	Paterson, NJ
G	15	Jaida Civil	6 ft 0 in (1.83 m)	Fr	Palm Bay Magnet HS	Vero Beach, FL
G	25	Deniya Prawl	6 ft 2 in (1.88 m)	Fr	IMG Academy	Toronto, ON
F	33	Alyssa Latham	6 ft 3 in (1.91 m)	Jr	Syracuse	Glenwood, IL
G	55	Talaysia Cooper	6 ft 0 in (1.83 m)	RS Jr	South Carolina	Turbeville, SC

Head coach

- Kim Caldwell (Glenville State)

Assistant coach(es)

- Roman Tubner (Centenary)
- Gabe Lazo (Barry)
- Jenna Burdette (Dayton)
- Angel Rizor (Cincinnati)
- Lexie Barrier (James Madison)

Legend

- (C) Team captain
- (S) Suspended
- (I) Ineligible
- (W) Walk-on
- Injured
- Current redshirt

Roster

== Schedule and results ==
Date time, TV	Rank^{#}	Opponent^{#}	Result	Record	High points	High rebounds	High assists	Site (attendance) city, state
Exhibition
October 29, 2025*; 6:30 p.m., SECN+/ESPN+	No. 8	Columbus State	W 148–48		18 – Tied	11 – Spearman	7 – Mya Pauldo	Thompson–Boling Arena (10,159); Knoxville, TN
Regular season
November 4, 2025*; 4:00 p.m., ESPN2	No. 8	vs. No. 9 NC State; Ro Greensboro Invitational	L 77–80	0–1	23 – Cooper	11 – Cooper	7 – Cooper	First Horizon Coliseum (4,731); Greensboro, NC
November 7, 2025*; 6:30 p.m., SECN+/ESPN+	No. 8	East Tennessee State	W 97–47	1–1	24 – Spearman	6 – Tied	4 – Robertson	Thompson–Boling Arena (10,671); Knoxville, TN
November 9, 2025*; 3:00 p.m., ESPN+	No. 8	at UT Martin; Pat Summitt Heritage Classic	W 72–61	2–1	17 – Robertson	8 – Tied	5 – Civil	Skyhawk Arena (4,560); Martin, TN
November 13, 2025*; 7:00 p.m., SECN	No. 12	Belmont	W 68–58	3–1	22 – Cooper	14 – Cooper	2 – Tied	Thompson–Boling Arena (10,043); Knoxville, TN
November 20, 2025*; 7:30 p.m., ESPN+	No. 15	at Middle Tennessee	W 85–41	4–1	20 – Barker	12 – Barker	5 – Cooper	Murphy Center (10,212); Murfreesboro, TN
November 23, 2025*; 2:00 p.m., SECN+/ESPN+	No. 15	Coppin State	W 88–35	5–1	32 – Robertson	11 – Cooper	9 – Cooper	Thompson–Boling Arena (9,947); Knoxville, TN
November 30, 2025*; 4:30 p.m., FS1	No. 14	at No. 3 UCLA	L 77–99	5–2	25 – Barker	6 – Tied	8 – Cooper	Pauley Pavilion (5,639); Los Angeles, CA
December 3, 2025*; 9:00 p.m., ESPN2	No. 19	at Stanford; ACC–SEC Challenge/Rivalry	W 65–62	6–2	19 – Cooper	8 – Spearman	6 – Cooper	Maples Pavilion (4,499); Stanford, CA
December 14, 2025*; 2:00 p.m., SECN+/ESPN+	No. 18	Winthrop	W 112–40	7–2	20 – Barker	10 – Barker	10 – Mia Pauldo	Thompson–Boling Arena (10,091); Knoxville, TN
December 20, 2025*; 10:30 a.m., FOX	No. 17	vs. No. 16 Louisville; Shark Beauty Women's Champions Classic	L 65–89	7–3	18 – Spearman	12 – Spearman	4 – Tied	Barclays Center (10,107); Brooklyn, NY
December 22, 2025*; 6:30 p.m., SECN+/ESPN+	No. 23	Southern	W 89–44	8–3	20 – Robertson	7 – Tied	4 – Cooper	Thompson–Boling Arena (9,843); Knoxville, TN
January 1, 2026; 2:00 p.m., SECN+/ESPN+	No. 23	Florida	W 76–65	9–3 (1–0)	17 – Cooper	12 – Barker	3 – Tied	Thompson–Boling Arena (10,230); Knoxville, TN
January 4, 2026; 4:00 p.m., SECN	No. 23	at Auburn	W 73–56	10–3 (2–0)	18 – Cooper	8 – Barker	4 – Cooper	Neville Arena (3,669); Auburn, AL
January 8, 2026; 7:30 p.m., SECN+/ESPN+	No. 20	at Mississippi State	W 90–80	11–3 (3–0)	26 – Mia Pauldo	6 – Tied	5 – Cooper	Humphrey Coliseum (3,905); Starkville, MS
January 11, 2026; 2:00 p.m., SECN+/ESPN+	No. 20	Arkansas	W 85–50	12–3 (4–0)	20 – Spearman	8 – Spearman	4 – Tied	Thompson–Boling Arena (11,335); Knoxville, TN
January 18, 2026; 2:00 p.m., SECN	No. 20	at No. 21 Alabama	W 70–59	13–3 (5–0)	16 – Cooper	11 – Barker	3 – Spearman	Coleman Coliseum (4,185); Tuscaloosa, AL
January 22, 2026; 6:30 p.m., SECN	No. 17	No. 11 Kentucky; Rivalry	W 60–58	14–3 (6–0)	21 – Mia Pauldo	6 – Civil	3 – Tied	Thompson–Boling Arena (12,551); Knoxville, TN
January 29, 2026; 6:30 p.m., SECN+/ESPN+	No. 15	Mississippi State	L 62–77	14–4 (6–1)	19 – Cooper	6 – Barker	4 – Cooper	Thompson–Boling Arena (10,418); Knoxville, TN
February 1, 2026*; 12:00 p.m., FOX	No. 15	at No. 1 UConn; Rivalry	L 66–96	14–5	16 – Barker	8 – Latham	4 – Mia Pauldo	PeoplesBank Arena (15,495); Hartford, CT
February 5, 2026; 6:30 p.m., SECN+/ESPN+	No. 19	at Georgia	W 82–77 ^{OT}	15–5 (7–1)	23 – Spearman	13 – Barker	3 – Tied	Stegeman Coliseum (2,844); Athens, GA
February 8, 2026; 3:00 p.m., ABC	No. 19	at No. 3 South Carolina	L 50–93	15–6 (7–2)	17 – Cooper	6 – Barker	5 – Cooper	Colonial Life Arena (16,206); Columbia, SC
February 12, 2026; 6:30 p.m., SECN+/ESPN+	No. 22	Missouri	W 98–53	16–6 (8–2)	22 – Barker	10 – Tied	4 – Cooper	Thompson–Boling Arena (10,489); Knoxville, TN
February 15, 2026; 3:00 p.m., ABC	No. 22	No. 4 Texas	L 63–65	16–7 (8–3)	29 – Cooper	7 – Civil	3 – Spearman	Thompson–Boling Arena (13,351); Knoxville, TN
February 17, 2026; 7:00 p.m., ESPNU	No. 21	at No. 17 Ole Miss	L 81–94	16–8 (8–4)	30 – Cooper	9 – Hurst	5 – Robertson	SJB Pavilion (3,335); Oxford, MS
February 19, 2026; 6:30 p.m., SECN+/ESPN+	No. 21	Texas A&M	L 74–82	16–9 (8–5)	29 – Barker	10 – Barker	4 – Cooper	Thompson-Boling Arena (10,039); Knoxville, TN
February 22, 2026; 2:00 p.m., ESPN	No. 21	at No. 11 Oklahoma	L 93–100	16–10 (8–6)	22 – Cooper	10 – Civil	4 – Cooper	Lloyd Noble Center (8,843); Norman, OK
February 26, 2026; 6:00 p.m., ESPN		at No. 6 LSU	L 73–89	16–11 (8–7)	17 – Civil	8 – Tied	3 – Tied	Pete Maravich Assembly Center (10,877); Baton Rouge, LA
March 1, 2026; 2:00 p.m., ESPN		No. 5 Vanderbilt; Rivalry	L 77–87	16–12 (8–8)	23 – Cooper	8 – Barker	3 – Cooper	Thompson-Boling Arena (12,037); Knoxville, TN
2026 SEC women's basketball tournament
March 5, 2026; 8:30 p.m., SECN	(6)	vs. (11) Alabama; SEC Tournament second round	L 64–76	16–13	20 – Barker	6 – Spearman	4 – Mia Pauldo	Bon Secours Wellness Arena (5,810); Greenville, SC
NCAA Tournament
March 20, 2026; 8:00 p.m., ESPN	(10 FW3)	vs. (7 FW3) NC State; First Round	L 61–76	16–14	24 – Cooper	6 – Tied	4 – Mia Pauldo	Crisler Center (8,491); Ann Arbor, MI
*Non-conference game. ^{#}Rankings from AP Poll. (#) Tournament seedings in parentheses. FW=Fort Worth. All times are in Eastern Time. 2025–26 Schedule

== Rankings ==
Ranking movements Legend: ██ Increase in ranking ██ Decrease in ranking RV = Received votes т = Tied with team above or below
	Week																				
Poll	Pre	1	2	3	4	5	6	7	8	9	10	11	12	13	14	15	16	17	18	19	Final
AP	8	12	15	14	19	18	17	23	23*	20	20	17	15	19	22	21	RV	RV			
Coaches	9	12т	13	11	17	18	18	21	22	22	20	17	15	17	22	21	RV				

*AP did not release a week 8 poll.
