= 2025–26 Texas A&M Aggies women's basketball team =

Intercollegiate basketball season

2025–26 Texas A&M Aggies women's basketball

WBIT, First Round
- Conference: Southeastern Conference
- Record: 14–13 (7–9 SEC)
- Head coach: Joni Taylor (4th season)
- Associate head coach: Chelsea Newton
- Assistant coaches: Robert Mosley; Alex Varlan; Alexis Hyder
- Home arena: Reed Arena

2025–26 SEC women's basketball standings
	Conf.				Overall
Team	W		L	PCT	W		L	PCT
No. 2 South Carolina	15	–	1	.938	36	–	4	.900
No. 10 Vanderbilt	13	–	3	.813	29	–	5	.853
No. 4 Texas †	13	–	3	.813	35	–	4	.897
No. 8 LSU	12	–	4	.750	29	–	6	.829
No. 12 Oklahoma	11	–	5	.688	26	–	8	.765
Tennessee	8	–	8	.500	16	–	14	.533
No. 21 Ole Miss	8	–	8	.500	24	–	12	.667
Georgia	8	–	8	.500	22	–	10	.688
No. 14 Kentucky	8	–	8	.500	25	–	11	.694
Texas A&M	7	–	9	.438	14	–	13	.519
No. 24 Alabama	7	–	9	.438	24	–	11	.686
Florida	5	–	11	.313	18	–	15	.545
Mississippi State	5	–	11	.313	18	–	13	.581
Missouri	4	–	12	.250	17	–	17	.500
Auburn	3	–	13	.188	15	–	17	.469
Arkansas	1	–	15	.063	12	–	20	.375
† 2026 SEC tournament winner Rankings from AP poll

The 2025–26 Texas A&M Aggies women's basketball team represented Texas A&M University during the 2025–26 NCAA Division I women's basketball season. The Aggies, led by fourth-year head coach Joni Taylor, played their home games at Reed Arena in College Station, Texas and compete as members of the Southeastern Conference (SEC).

== Previous season ==
The Aggies finished the 2024–25 season 10–19, 3–13 SEC play to finish in a four-way tie for last place in the SEC. As a No. 16 seed in the SEC Tournament, they lost in the first round to Tennessee.

== Offseason ==
=== Departures ===
Texas A&M departures
Name	Number	Pos.	Height	Year	Hometown	Reason for departure
Erica Moon	3	G	5'6"	(redshirt) Freshman	Atlanta, GA	Transferred to Georgia Tech
Aicha Coulibaly	5	G	6'0"	Graduate student	Bamako, Mali	Graduated/2025 WNBA draft; selected 22nd overall by Chicago Sky
Kyndall Hunter	7	G	5'7"	(redshirt) Junior	Houston, TX	Transferred to Houston
Jada Malone	13	F	6'3"	(redshirt) Junior	Spring, TX	Transferred to Texas Tech
Solè Williams	15	G	5'9"	Sophomore	Cincinnati, OH	Transferred to Florida State
Taliyah Parker	21	G	6'1"	Freshman	Grand Prairie, TX	Transferred to TCU
Amirah Abdur-Rahim	23	F	6'3"	Graduate student	Marietta, GA	Transferred to Houston
Sahara Jones	24	G	6'0"	Graduate student	San Antonio, TX	Graduated

=== Incoming transfers ===
Texas A&M incoming transfers
Name	Number	Pos.	Height	Year	Hometown	Previous school
Ny'Ceara Pryor	1	G	5'3"	Senior	Baltimore, MD	Sacred Heart
Jordan Weberster	6	G	5'10"	Graduate student	Dallas, TX	Kansas
Pien Steenbergen	7	G	6'1"	(redshirt) Junior	Berlicum, Netherlands	Liberty
Lemyah Hylton	10	G	5'11"	Senior	London, ON	Miami (FL)
Emerald Parker	24	C	6'3"	(redshirt) Sophomore	Ruston, LA	Little Rock
Salese Blow	25	G	5'10"	Junior	Murphy, TX	Wichita State
Fatmata Janneh	44	F	6'2"	Junior	London, England	Saint Peter's

=== 2025 recruiting class ===
There was no recruiting class of 2025.

== Roster ==
2025–26 Texas A&M Aggies women's basketball team
Players
Coaches

Pos.	#	Name	Height	Year	Previous school	Hometown
G	1	Ny'Ceara Pryor	5 ft 3 in (1.6 m)	Sr	Western HS; Sacred Heart	Baltimore, MD
G	4	Chaney Spencer	5 ft 9 in (1.75 m)	Fr	Lake Creek HS	Montgomery, TX
F	5	Vanessa Saidu	6 ft 2 in (1.88 m)	So	Robbinsdale Cooper HS	Minneapolis, MN
G	6	Jordan Webster	5 ft 10 in (1.78 m)	GS	Prestonwood Christian Academy; Kansas	Dallas, TX
G	7	Pien Steenbergen	6 ft 1 in (1.85 m)	RS Jr	Calandlyceum; Liberty	Berlicum, Netherlands
G	10	Lemyah Hylton	5 ft 11 in (1.8 m)	Sr	Southwest Academy Girls Prep; Miami (FL)	London, ON
G	11	Talia Kavoka	5 ft 6 in (1.68 m)	Fr		Évry-Courcouronnes, France
F	15	Ibifaa Azogu	5 ft 11 in (1.8 m)	Fr	Bridgeland HS	Cypress, TX
G	20	Janae Kent	6 ft 1 in (1.85 m)	Jr	Oak Forest HS; LSU	Oak Forest, IL
G	23	Gianna Gentry	5 ft 9 in (1.75 m)	Fr	Shadow Creek HS	Pearland, TX
C	24	Emerald Parker	6 ft 3 in (1.91 m)	RS So	Carroll HS; Little Rock	Ruston, LA
G	25	Salese Blow	5 ft 10 in (1.78 m)	Jr	Plano Sr. HS; Wichita State	Murphy, TX
F	26	Anita Franchini	6 ft 1 in (1.85 m)	Fr		Verona, Italy
F	32	Lauren Ware	6 ft 5 in (1.96 m)	GS	Century HS; Arizona	Bismarck, ND
F	44	Fatmata Janneh	6 ft 2 in (1.88 m)	Jr	Barking Abbey Sixth Form; Saint Peter's	London, England

Head coach

- Joni Taylor (Alabama)

Assistant coach(es)

- Chelsea Newton (Rutgers)
- Robert Mosley (Miles)
- Alex Varlan (Tennessee)
- Alexis Hyder (LSU)

Legend

- (C) Team captain
- (S) Suspended
- (I) Ineligible
- (W) Walk-on
- Injured
- Current redshirt

Roster

== Schedule and results ==
Date time, TV	Rank^{#}	Opponent^{#}	Result	Record	High points	High rebounds	High assists	Site (attendance) city, state
Non-conference regular season
November 5, 2025*; 7:00 p.m., SECN+/ESPN+		Texas A&M–Corpus Christi	W 81–43	1–0	16 – Pryor	10 – Janneh	8 – Pryor	Reed Arena (2,785); College Station, TX
November 13, 2025*; 11:00 a.m., SECN+/ESPN+		Tarleton State	W 79–64	2–0	18 – Blow	11 – Janneh	8 – Pryor	Reed Arena (7,851); College Station, TX
November 16, 2025*; 1:00 p.m., ESPN+		at Kansas State	W 77–72	3–0	24 – Pryor	7 – Ware	6 – Pryor	Bramlage Coliseum (3,676); Manhattan, KS
November 22, 2025*; 10:30 p.m., BallerTV		vs. VCU; Hawaii North Shore Showcase	W 78–66	4–0	18 – Pryor	15 – Janneh	11 – Pryor	George Q. Cannon Activities Center (370); Lāʻie, HI
November 24, 2025*; 4:00 p.m., BallerTV		vs. UT Arlington; Hawaii North Shore Showcase	L 60–61	4–1	11 – tied	10 – Janneh	3 – tied	George Q. Cannon Activities Center (349); Lāʻie, HI
November 25, 2025*; 6:00 p.m., BallerTV		vs. Colorado; Hawaii North Shore Showcase	W 59–46	5–1	23 – Pryor	15 – Janneh	6 – Pryor	George Q. Cannon Activities Center (359); Lāʻie, HI
December 3, 2025*; 6:15 p.m., SECN		Georgia Tech; ACC–SEC Challenge	W 72–63	6–1	17 – Pryor	13 – Ware	10 – Pryor	Reed Arena (3,626); College Station, TX
December 14, 2025*; 2:00 p.m., SECN+/ESPN+		West Virginia	L 45–63	6–2	12 – Janneh	10 – Janneh	5 – Pryor	Reed Arena (3,498); College Station, TX
December 21, 2025*; 12:00 p.m., SECN+/ESPN+		Prairie View A&M	W 93–60	7–2	21 – Tied	19 – Janneh	12 – Pryor	Reed Arena (1,920); College Station, TX
SEC regular season
January 1, 2026; 7:00 p.m., SECN+/ESPN+		No. 8т Oklahoma	L 50–72	7–3 (0–1)	20 – Pryor	10 – Janneh	6 – Pryor	Reed Arena (3,847); College Station, TX
January 4, 2026; 1:00 p.m., SECN+/ESPN+		at Georgia	L 56–64 ^{OT}	7–4 (0–2)	23 – Carnegie	10 – Carnegie	6 – Turner	Stegeman Coliseum (3,944); Athens, GA
January 8, 2026; 6:00 p.m., SECN+/ESPN+		at Florida	W 74–66	8–4 (1–2)	22 – Janneh	9 – Janneh	12 – Pryor	O'Connell Center (1,580); Gainesville, FL
January 11, 2026; 2:00 p.m., SECN+/ESPN+		No. 7 Vanderbilt	L 51–91	8–5 (1–3)	11 – Pryor	7 – Tied	5 – Pryor	Reed Arena (3,426); College Station, TX
January 18, 2026; 3:00 p.m., SECN		at No. 4 Texas; Lone Star Showdown	L 35–80	8–6 (1–4)	16 – Kent	5 – Kent	1 – Tied	Moody Center (10,331); Austin, TX
January 22, 2026; 8:00 p.m., SECN		No. 6 LSU	L 54–98	8–7 (1–5)	14 – Janneh	6 – Janneh	6 – Pryor	Reed Arena (3,771); College Station, TX
January 25, 2026; 5:00 p.m., SECN		at Missouri	L 70–81	8–8 (1–6)	22 – Pryor	7 – Janneh	7 – Pryor	Mizzou Arena (2,976); Columbia, MO
January 29, 2026; 6:00 p.m., SECN+/ESPN+		at No. 10 Oklahoma	L 58–85	8–9 (1–7)	15 – Ware	7 – Ware	5 – Pryor	Lloyd Noble Center (4,624); Norman, OK
February 2, 2026; 7:00 p.m., ESPN2		No. 3 South Carolina	L 56–71	8–10 (1–8)	14 – Pryor	9 – Franchini	3 – Hylton	Reed Arena (4,332); College Station, TX
February 8, 2026; 5:00 p.m., SECN		No. 21 Alabama	W 72–69	9–10 (2–8)	20 – Pryor	15 – Janneh	7 – Pryor	Reed Arena (2,498); College Station, TX
February 12, 2026; 5:30 p.m., SECN		at No. 18 Kentucky	L 55–75	9–11 (2–9)	21 – Pryor	8 – Tied	4 – Ware	Memorial Coliseum (4,315); Lexington, KY
February 15, 2026; 5:00 p.m., SECN		Auburn	W 81–63	10–11 (3–9)	16 – Janneh	12 – Janneh	11 – Pryor	Reed Arena (2,913); College Station, TX
February 19, 2026; 5:30 p.m., SECN+/ESPN+		at No. 21 Tennessee	W 82–74	11–11 (4–9)	22 – Pryor	12 – Janneh	10 – Pryor	Thompson–Boling Arena (10,039); Knoxville, TN
February 22, 2026; 2:00 p.m., SECN+/ESPN+		at Arkansas	W 78–57	12–11 (5–9)	16 – Pryor	13 – Janneh	12 – Pryor	Bud Walton Arena (3,448); Fayetteville, AR
February 26, 2026; 7:00 p.m., SECN+/ESPN+		Mississippi State	W 68–64	13–11 (6–9)	15 – Janneh	11 – Janneh	11 – Pryor	Reed Arena (2,932); College Station, TX
March 1, 2026; 2:00 p.m., SECN+/ESPN+		at No. 19 Ole Miss	W 66–58	14–11 (7–9)	16 – Pryor	10 – Janneh	6 – Pryor	SJB Pavilion (3,181); Oxford, MS
SEC tournament
March 4, 2026; 5:00 p.m., SECN	(10)	vs. (15) Auburn; SEC Tournament first round	L 49–50	14–12	25 – Pryor	4 – Tied	4 – Pryor	Bon Secours Wellness Arena; Greenville, SC
WBIT
March 19, 2026*; 7:00 p.m., ESPN+	(1)	McNeese; First Round	L 48–68	14–13	16 – Pryor	10 – Ware	4 – Pryor	Reed Arena (996); College Station, TX
*Non-conference game. ^{#}Rankings from AP poll. (#) Tournament seedings in parentheses. All times are in Central.

== See also ==
- 2025–26 Texas A&M Aggies men's basketball team
