= 2025–26 Auburn Tigers women's basketball team =

Intercollegiate basketball season

2025–26 Auburn Tigers women's basketball
- Conference: Southeastern Conference
- Record: 15–17 (3–13 SEC)
- Head coach: Larry Vickers (1st season)
- Assistant coaches: Candice M. Jackson; Caroline McCombs; Rodney Hill; Taja Cole
- Home arena: Neville Arena

2025–26 SEC women's basketball standings
	Conf.				Overall
Team	W		L	PCT	W		L	PCT
No. 2 South Carolina	15	–	1	.938	36	–	4	.900
No. 10 Vanderbilt	13	–	3	.813	29	–	5	.853
No. 4 Texas †	13	–	3	.813	35	–	4	.897
No. 8 LSU	12	–	4	.750	29	–	6	.829
No. 12 Oklahoma	11	–	5	.688	26	–	8	.765
Tennessee	8	–	8	.500	16	–	14	.533
No. 21 Ole Miss	8	–	8	.500	24	–	12	.667
Georgia	8	–	8	.500	22	–	10	.688
No. 14 Kentucky	8	–	8	.500	25	–	11	.694
Texas A&M	7	–	9	.438	14	–	13	.519
No. 24 Alabama	7	–	9	.438	24	–	11	.686
Florida	5	–	11	.313	18	–	15	.545
Mississippi State	5	–	11	.313	18	–	13	.581
Missouri	4	–	12	.250	17	–	17	.500
Auburn	3	–	13	.188	15	–	17	.469
Arkansas	1	–	15	.063	12	–	20	.375
† 2026 SEC tournament winner Rankings from AP poll

The 2025–26 Auburn Tigers women's basketball team represented Auburn University during the 2025–26 NCAA Division I women's basketball season. The Tigers, led by first-year head coach Larry Vickers, played their home games at Neville Arena and compete as members of the Southeastern Conference (SEC).

== Previous season ==
The Tigers finished the 2024–25 season 12–18, 3–13 SEC play to finish in a four-way tie for last place in the SEC. As a No. 14 seed in the SEC Tournament, they lost in the first round to Florida.

Auburn fired Harris on March 6, 2025, after four seasons and a 58–63 record. Norfolk State head coach Vickers was hired by the Tigers on March 23.

== Offseason ==
=== Departures ===
Auburn departures
Name	Number	Pos.	Height	Year	Hometown	Reason for departure
Taliah Scott	0	G	5'9"	Sophomore	Orange, FL	Transferred to Baylor
Celia Sumbane	1	F	6'2"	Senior	Maputo, Mozambique	Graduated
Jordan Hunter	2	G	5'8"	Freshman	Trussville, AL	Transferred to Memphis
DeYona Gaston	5	F	6'2"	Graduate student	Pearland, TX	Graduated
Yakiya Milton	7	F	6'4"	Sophomore	Jacksonville, FL	Transferred to USC
Yuting Deng	9	G	6'0"	Freshman	Hunan, China	Transferred to Baylor
Mar'shaun Bostic	12	G	5'8"	Senior	St. Louis, MO	Graduated
Taylen Collins	14	F	6'1"	Graduate student	Muldrow, OK	Graduated
Oyindamola Akinbolawa	20	C	6'5"	Junior	Lagos, Nigeria	Transferred to Syracuse
Audia Young	21	G	5'9"	(redshirt) Sophomore	Tallahassee, FL	Transferred to Xavier
Savannah Scott	30	C	6'4"	Sophomore	Conway, AR	Transferred to UCF
Timya Thurman	32	C	6'5"	Sophomore	Linden, AL	Transferred to Southern Miss

=== Incoming transfers ===
Auburn incoming transfers
Name	Number	Pos.	Height	Year	Hometown	Previous school
Angena Belloso	0	G	5'11"	Senior	Montgat, Spain	FIU
Mya Petticord	1	G	5'9"	Senior	Detroit, MI	Rutgers
Ja'Mia Harris	2	G	5'11"	(redshirt) Junior	Lancaster, TX	Texas State
Khady Leye	6	F	6'2"	Sophomore	Louga, Senegal	Towson
A'riel Jackson	7	G	5'9"	Senior	Brooklyn, NY	Cincinnati
Arek Anguoi	23	C	6'8"	(redshirt) Freshman	Juba, South Sudan	UCF
Clara Koulibaly	30	F	6'3"	Junior	Montreal, QC	Gulf Coast State College
Quanirah Montague	35	F	6'5"	Junior	Atlantic City, NJ	Mississippi State

=== 2025 recruiting class ===
College recruiting
Name	Hometown	School	Height	Weight	Commit date
Harrissoum Coulibaly; G	Petersburg, VA	Shining Stars Sports Academy	5 ft 10 in (1.78 m)	N/A	
Harrissoum Coulibaly; G	Recruit ratings: ESPN: (91)				
Overall recruit ranking:
Note: In many cases, Scout, Rivals, 247Sports, On3, and ESPN may conflict in their listings of height and weight.; In these cases, the average was taken. ESPN grades are on a 100-point scale.; Sources: "2025 Player Commits". ESPN. Archived from the original on October 2, 2025.

==== 2026 recruiting class ====
College recruiting (2026)
Name	Hometown	School	Height	Weight	Commit date
Zaniyah Williams; PG	Suffolk, VA	Montverde Academy	5 ft 8 in (1.73 m)	N/A	
Zaniyah Williams; PG	Recruit ratings: ESPN: (92)				
Overall recruit ranking:
Note: In many cases, Scout, Rivals, 247Sports, On3, and ESPN may conflict in their listings of height and weight.; In these cases, the average was taken. ESPN grades are on a 100-point scale.; Sources: "2026 Player Commits". ESPN. Archived from the original on October 2, 2025.

== Roster ==
2025–26 Auburn Tigers women's basketball team
Players
Coaches

Pos.	#	Name	Height	Year	Previous school	Hometown
G	0	Angena Belloso	5 ft 11 in (1.8 m)	Sr	Mireia CE; St. Francis Brooklyn	Montgat, Spain
G	1	Mya Petticord	5 ft 9 in (1.75 m)	Sr	Arbor Prep; Rutgers	Detroit, MI
G	2	Ja'Mia Harris	5 ft 11 in (1.8 m)	RS Jr	DeSoto HS; Texas State	Lacaster, TX
G	3	Harissoum Coulibaly	5 ft 10 in (1.78 m)	Fr	Shining Stars Sports Academy (VA)	Paris, France
G	4	Kaitlyn Duhon	5 ft 10 in (1.78 m)	RS Jr	Summer Creek HS	Houston, TX
F	6	Khady Leye	6 ft 2 in (1.88 m)	So	SPIRE Academy; Towson	Louga, Senegal
G	7	A'riel Jackson	5 ft 9 in (1.75 m)	Sr	Bishop Loughlin Memorial HS; Cincinnati	Brooklyn, NY
G	10	Sania Richardson	5 ft 5 in (1.65 m)	Fr	Ada HS	Ada, OK
G/F	11	Syriah Daniels	6 ft 0 in (1.83 m)	So	Auburn HS	Auburn, AL
C	23	Arek Angui	6 ft 9 in (2.06 m)	RS Fr	Greenforest HS; UCF	Juba, South Sudan
F	30	Clara Koulibaly	6 ft 3 in (1.91 m)	Jr	Gulf Coast State College	Montreal, QC
F	35	Quanirah Montague	6 ft 5 in (1.96 m)	Jr	Atlantic City HS; Mississippi State	Atlantic City, NJ

Head coach

- Larry Vickers (Norfolk State)

Assistant coach(es)

- Candice M. Jackson (Michigan State)
- Caroline McCombs (Youngstown State)
- Rodney Hill (Texas A&M)
- Taja Cole (Georgia)

Legend

- (C) Team captain
- (S) Suspended
- (I) Ineligible
- (W) Walk-on
- Injured
- Current redshirt

Roster

== Schedule and results ==
Date time, TV	Rank^{#}	Opponent^{#}	Result	Record	High points	High rebounds	High assists	Site (attendance) city, state
Non-conference regular season
November 3, 2025*; 4:30 p.m., ESPN+		at Charlotte	W 71–58	1–0	19 – Tied	8 – Harris	4 – Duhon	Dale F. Halton Arena (1,226); Charlotte, NC
November 8, 2025*; 1:00 p.m., SECN+/ESPN+		Alabama State	W 82–41	2–0	21 – Petticord	8 – Angui	4 – Tied	Neville Arena (2,770); Auburn, AL
November 10, 2025*; 6:00 p.m., SECN+/ESPN+		UNC Greensboro	W 64–57	3–0	18 – Petticord	7 – Harris	4 – Jackson	Neville Arena (2,832); Auburn, AL
November 13, 2025*; 11:00 a.m., SECN+/ESPN+		Mississippi Valley State	W 110–50	4–0	20 – Leye	11 – Angui	4 – Coulibaly	Neville Arena (5,769); Auburn, AL
November 17, 2025*; 6:00 p.m., SECN+/ESPN+		Georgia State	W 69–65	5–0	19 – Coulibaly	10 – Leye	3 – Tied	Neville Arena (2,765); Auburn, AL
November 20, 2025*; 6:00 p.m., SECN+/ESPN+		Rutgers	W 51–46	6–0	14 – Leye	6 – Tied	1 – Tied	Neville Arena (2,706); Auburn, AL
November 24, 2025*; 4:00 p.m., FloHoops		vs. UTSA; Hoopfest Basketball Women’s Challenge	W 59–42	7–0	14 – Petticord	6 – Duhon	3 – Coulibaly	Comerica Center (259); Frisco, TX
November 26, 2025*; 8:00 p.m., FloHoops		vs. California; Hoopfest Basketball Women’s Challenge	W 58–50	8–0	17 – Jackson	5 – Tied	3 – Leye	Comerica Center (162); Frisco, TX
November 30, 2025*; 2:00 p.m., SECN+/ESPN+		Oregon	L 53–58	8–1	13 – Petticord	6 – Jackson	4 – Harris	Neville Arena (3,115); Auburn, AL
December 3, 2025*; 4:00 p.m., ACCN		at Syracuse; ACC–SEC Challenge	L 60–66 ^{OT}	8–2	20 – Darius	13 – Izoje	3 – Darius	JMA Wireless Dome (2,166); Syracuse, NY
December 13, 2025*; 12:00 p.m., ESPN+		at Seton Hall	L 63–69	8–3	20 – Duhon	8 – Duhon	4 – Jackson	Walsh Gymnasium (838); South Orange, NJ
December 16, 2025*; 6:30 p.m., ESPN+		at Middle Tennessee	W 68–52	9–3	16 – Coulibaly	6 – Tied	4 – Tied	Murphy Center (3,012); Murfreesboro, TN
December 18, 2025*; 6:00 p.m., SECN+/ESPN+		Alcorn State	W 62–50	10–3	15 – Leye	5 – Leye	3 – Petticord	Neville Arena (2,670); Auburn, AL
December 29, 2025*; 1:00 p.m., SECN+/ESPN+		Jackson State	W 64–48	11–3	21 – Petticord	6 – Leye	4 – Coulibaly	Neville Arena (3,177); Auburn, AL
SEC regular season
January 1, 2026; 3:00 p.m., SECN+/ESPN+		at Mississippi State	L 53–75	11–4 (0–1)	14 – Coulibaly	7 – Montague	2 – Tied	Humphrey Coliseum (3,710); Starkville, MS
January 4, 2026; 3:00 p.m., SECN		No. 23 Tennessee	L 56–73	11–5 (0–2)	14 – Leye	6 – Leye	3 – Jackson	Neville Arena (3,669); Auburn, AL
January 8, 2026; 7:00 p.m., SECN+/ESPN+		at No. 2 Texas	L 36–97	11–6 (0–3)	11 – Coulibaly	3 – Tied	2 – Richardson	Moody Center (8,929); Austin, TX
January 11, 2026; 2:00 p.m., SECN+/ESPN+		Florida; We Back Pat	W 60–50	12–6 (1–3)	14 – Tied	9 – Harris	4 – Tied	Neville Arena (4,095); Auburn, AL
January 15, 2026; 8:00 p.m., SECN		No. 21 Alabama; We Back Pat	W 58–54	13–6 (2–3)	16 – Leye	9 – Leye	3 – Richardson	Neville Arena (3,464); Auburn, AL
January 22, 2026; 6:30 p.m., SECN+/ESPN+		at No. 5 Vanderbilt	L 53–81	13–7 (2–4)	13 – Coulibaly	5 – Angui	4 – Richardson	Memorial Gymnasium (3,241); Nashville, TN
January 25, 2026; 1:00 p.m., SECN		No. 16 Oklahoma	L 65–72	13–8 (2–5)	19 – Jackson	8 – Duhon	5 – Jackson	Neville Arena (3,049); Auburn, AL
January 29, 2026; 8:00 p.m., SECN		No. 3 South Carolina	L 51–81	13–9 (2–6)	11 – Daniels	7 – Leye	2 – Harris	Neville Arena (4,099); Auburn, AL
February 2, 2026; 6:00 p.m., SECN+/ESPN+		vs. No. 13 Ole Miss	L 45–71	13–10 (2–7)	11 – Coulibaly	4 – Duhon	2 – Tied	Legacy Arena (Note: The game against Ole Miss was moved to Birmingham, Alabama, because of ongoing winter storm impacts in Oxford, Mississippi.) (3,787); Birmingham, AL
February 5, 2026; 6:00 p.m., SECN+/ESPN+		at Florida	L 53–61	13–11 (2–8)	18 – Harris	7 – Harris	6 – Richardson	O'Connell Center (1,752); Gainesville, FL
February 8, 2026; 1:00 p.m., SECN		No. 5 LSU; Play4Kay	L 44–77	13–12 (2–9)	13 – Coulibaly	10 – Koulibaly	4 – Coulibaly	Neville Arena (5,810); Auburn, AL
February 15, 2026; 5:00 p.m., SECN		at Texas A&M	L 63–81	13–13 (2–10)	23 – Duhon	6 – Duhon	3 – Petticord	Reed Arena (2,913); College Station, TX
February 19, 2026; 6:30 p.m., SECN+/ESPN+		at Missouri; Play4Kay	W 71–58	14–13 (3–10)	19 – Duhon	7 – Duhon	4 – Belloso	Mizzou Arena (2,804); Columbia, MO
February 23, 2026; 6:30 p.m., SECN		No. 23 Georgia	L 52–74	14–14 (3–11)	16 – Leye	5 – Tied	4 – Coulibaly	Neville Arena (3,680); Auburn, AL
February 26, 2026; 6:00 p.m., SECN+/ESPN+		No. 16 Kentucky	L 56–63	14–15 (3–12)	20 – Leye	8 – Leye	2 – Tied	Neville Arena (3,341); Auburn, AL
March 1, 2026; 1:00 p.m., SECN		at Arkansas	L 41–70	14–16 (3–13)	15 – Coulibaly	7 – Duhon	3 – Harris	Bud Walton Arena (3,670); Fayetteville, AR
SEC Tournament
March 4, 2026; 5:00 p.m., SECN	(15)	vs. (10) Texas A&M; First Round	W 50–49	15–16	14 – Duhon	15 – Leye	4 – Leye	Bon Secours Wellness Arena; Greenville, SC
March 5, 2026; 5:00 p.m., SECN	(15)	vs. (7) No. 24 Ole Miss; Second Round	L 57–73	15–17	17 – Leye	8 – Leye	3 – Tied	Bon Secours Wellness Arena; Greenville, SC
*Non-conference game. ^{#}Rankings from AP Poll. (#) Tournament seedings in parentheses. All times are in Central Time.

== Rankings ==
Ranking movements Legend: ██ Increase in ranking ██ Decrease in ranking — = Not ranked RV = Received votes
	Week																				
Poll	Pre	1	2	3	4	5	6	7	8	9	10	11	12	13	14	15	16	17	18	19	Final
AP	—	—	—	—	—	—	—	—	—*	—											
Coaches	—	—	—	—	—	RV	—	—	—	RV											

*AP did not release a week 8 poll.

== See also ==
- 2025–26 Auburn Tigers men's basketball team
