= 2025–26 Arkansas Razorbacks women's basketball team =

Intercollegiate basketball season

2025–26 Arkansas Razorbacks women's basketball
- Conference: Southeastern Conference
- Record: 12–20 (1–15 SEC)
- Head coach: Kelsi Musick (1st season)
- Assistant coaches: Lacey Goldwire; Nick Bradford; Alex Furr; Brad Johnson
- Home arena: Bud Walton Arena

2025–26 SEC women's basketball standings
	Conf.				Overall
Team	W		L	PCT	W		L	PCT
No. 2 South Carolina	15	–	1	.938	36	–	4	.900
No. 10 Vanderbilt	13	–	3	.813	29	–	5	.853
No. 4 Texas †	13	–	3	.813	35	–	4	.897
No. 8 LSU	12	–	4	.750	29	–	6	.829
No. 12 Oklahoma	11	–	5	.688	26	–	8	.765
Tennessee	8	–	8	.500	16	–	14	.533
No. 21 Ole Miss	8	–	8	.500	24	–	12	.667
Georgia	8	–	8	.500	22	–	10	.688
No. 14 Kentucky	8	–	8	.500	25	–	11	.694
Texas A&M	7	–	9	.438	14	–	13	.519
No. 24 Alabama	7	–	9	.438	24	–	11	.686
Florida	5	–	11	.313	18	–	15	.545
Mississippi State	5	–	11	.313	18	–	13	.581
Missouri	4	–	12	.250	17	–	17	.500
Auburn	3	–	13	.188	15	–	17	.469
Arkansas	1	–	15	.063	12	–	20	.375
† 2026 SEC tournament winner Rankings from AP poll

The 2025–26 Arkansas Razorbacks women's basketball team represented the University of Arkansas during the 2025–26 NCAA Division I women's basketball season. The Razorbacks, led by first-year head coach Kelsi Musick, played their home games at Bud Walton Arena and compete as members of the Southeastern Conference (SEC).

== Previous season ==
The Razorbacks finished the 2024–25 season 10–22, 3–13 in SEC play to finish in a four-way tie for last place in the SEC. As a No. 13 seed in the SEC Tournament, they lost in the first round to Georgia.

Head coach Mike Neighbors announced his resignation from Arkansas on March 11, 2025, after eight seasons and a 148–114 record. The Razorbacks hired Oral Roberts head coach Musick on March 21.

== Offseason ==
=== Departures ===
Arkansas departures
Name	Number	Pos.	Height	Year	Hometown	Reason for departure
Phoenix Stotijn	1	G	5'9"	Freshman	Amsterdam, Netherlands	Transferred to Indiana
Kiki Smith	2	G	5'7"	Sophomore	Topeka, KS	Transferred to Purdue
Izzy Higginbottom	3	G	5'7"	(redshirt) Senior	Batesville, AR	Graduated
Pinja Paananen	16	F	6'2"	Freshman	Laukaa, Finland	Transferred to Sacramento State
Karley Johnson	20	G	5'9"	Junior	Oklahoma City, OK	Transferred to Grand Canyon
Loren Lindsey	21	G	5'10"	(redshirt) Sophomore	Fayetteville, AR	TBD
Vera Ojenuwa	22	F	6'4"	Sophomore	Delta State, Nigeria	Transferred to Georgia
Carly Keats	23	G	5'8"	Junior	Choctaw, MS	Transferred to Southern Miss

=== Incoming transfers ===
Arkansas incoming transfers
Name	Number	Pos.	Height	Year	Hometown	Previous school
Maria Anis Rodriguez	1	F	6'1"	Sophomore	Barcelona, Spain	Oklahoma State
Taleyah Jones	10	G	5'10"	Senior	Broken Arrow, OK	Oral Roberts
Wyvette Mayberry	11	G	5'7"	Graduate student	Tulsa, OK	Kansas
Ashlynn Chlarson	21	C	6'3"	Junior	Pima, AZ	Eastern Arizona College
Emily Robinson	23	F	5'10"	Junior	Bokchito, OK	Oral Roberts

=== 2025 recruiting class ===
There was no recruiting class of 2025.

== Roster ==
2025–26 Arkansas Razorbacks women's basketball team
Players
Coaches

Pos.	#	Name	Height	Year	Previous school	Hometown
F	1	Maria Anis Rodriguez	6 ft 1 in (1.85 m)	So	INS Joaquim; Oklahoma State	Barcelona, Spain
G	3	Harmonie Ware	5 ft 10 in (1.78 m)	Fr	Bradley Central HS	Cleveland, TN
F	7	Cristina Sánchez Cerqueira	6 ft 1 in (1.85 m)	Jr	Segle XXI	Granada, Spain
G	10	Taleyah Jones	5 ft 10 in (1.78 m)	Sr	Broken Arrow HS; Oral Roberts	Broken Arrow, OK
G	11	Wyvette Mayberry	5 ft 7 in (1.7 m)	GS	Booker T. Washington HS; Kansas	Tulsa, OK
G	15	Jada Bates	6 ft 3 in (1.91 m)	So	McEachern HS	Powder Springs, GA
C	21	Ashlynn Chlarson	6 ft 3 in (1.91 m)	Jr	Pima HS; Eastern Arizona College	Pima, AZ
G	22	Bonnie Deas	5 ft 9 in (1.75 m)	Fr	Centre of Excellence	Frankston, Australia
G	23	Emily Robinson	5 ft 10 in (1.78 m)	Jr	Caddo HS; Oral Roberts	Bokchito, OK
G	24	Aisha Hassan	5 ft 7 in (1.7 m)	Fr	Covent of the Scared Heart	Alexandria, Egypt
C	25	Danika Galea	6 ft 3 in (1.91 m)	So	Elite Basket Roma	St. Paul's Bay, Malta
F	34	Jenna Lawrence	6 ft 3 in (1.91 m)	Jr	Farmington HS	Farmington, AR
G	44	Maryn Archer	5 ft 7 in (1.7 m)	RS Jr	Derby HS	Derby, KS

Head coach

- Kelsi Musick (Cameron)

Assistant coach(es)

- Lacey Goldwire (Oklahoma State)
- Nick Bradford (Kansas)
- Alex Furr (Fresno State)
- Brad Johnson (Arkansas Tech)

Legend

- (C) Team captain
- (S) Suspended
- (I) Ineligible
- (W) Walk-on
- Injured
- Current redshirt

Roster

== Schedule and results ==
Date time, TV	Rank^{#}	Opponent^{#}	Result	Record	High points	High rebounds	High assists	Site (attendance) city, state
Exhibition
October 30, 2025*; 6:30 p.m.		Arkansas–Fort Smith	W 100–42		21 – Jones	10 – Lawrence	2 – Tied	Bud Walton Arena; Fayetteville, AR
Non-conference regular season
November 4, 2025; 6:30 p.m., SECN+/ESPN+		Louisiana Tech	W 93–81	1–0	25 – Deas	12 – Jones	6 – Jones	Bud Walton Arena (2,111); Fayetteville, AR
November 7, 2025*; 10:30 a.m., SECN+/ESPN+		Arkansas–Pine Bluff	W 101–49	2–0	26 – Lawrence	11 – Deas	6 – Deas	Bud Walton Arena (13,032); Fayetteville, AR
November 10, 2025*; 8:00 p.m., SECN		Central Arkansas	W 89–77 ^{OT}	3–0	18 – Deas	12 – Deas	3 – Jones	Bud Walton Arena (1,981); Fayetteville, AR
November 13, 2025*; 6:30 p.m., SECN+/ESPN+		Southeastern Louisiana	W 68–60	4–0	21 – Jones	9 – Anais Rodriguez	3 – Tied	Bud Walton Arena (1,977); Fayetteville, AR
November 16, 2025*; 2:00 p.m., ESPN+		at Texas Tech	L 68–80	4–1	20 – Jones	9 – Deas	2 – Tied	United Supermarkets Arena (4,559); Lubbock, TX
November 20, 2025*; 6:30 p.m., SECN+/ESPN+		Little Rock	W 96–57	5–1	19 – Jones	15 – Deas	4 – Tied	Bud Walton Arena (2,113); Fayetteville, AR
November 25, 2025*; 5:45 p.m., BallerTV		vs. Drake; Music City Classic	W 79–72	6–1	15 – Jones	13 – Deas	4 – Robinson	Trojan Fieldhouse (251); Nashville, TN
November 26, 2025*; 5:45 p.m., BallerTV		vs. Southern Illinois; Music City Classic	W 73–63	7–1	23 – Jones	8 – Deas	6 – Anais Rodriguez	Trojan Fieldhouse (222); Nashville, TN
November 30, 2025*; 12:30 p.m., SECN+/ESPN+		Harvard	L 51–69	7–2	19 – Jones	5 – Tied	2 – Tied	Bud Walton Arena (2,310); Fayetteville, AR
December 4, 2025*; 6:00 p.m., ACCN		at SMU; ACC–SEC Challenge	L 63–78	7–3	14 – Ware	14 – Deas	5 – Mayberry	Moody Coliseum (1,378); Dallas, TX
December 7, 2025*; 2:00 p.m., SECN+/ESPN+		Jackson State	W 77–46	8–3	24 – Ware	11 – Deas	5 – Deas	Bud Walton Arena (2,249); Fayetteville, AR
December 13, 2025*; 1:00 p.m., ESPN+		at Missouri State	W 73–58	9–3	17 – Lawrence	8 – Tied	3 – Mayberry	Great Southern Bank Arena (2,862); Springfield, MO
December 17, 2025*; 6:30 p.m., SECN+/ESPN+		Kansas City	W 92–77	10–3	24 – Jones	16 – Deas	7 – Deas	Bud Walton Arena (2,036); Fayetteville, AR
December 20, 2025*; 1:00 p.m., SECN+/ESPN+		Stephen F. Austin	W 82–73	11–3	24 – Lawrence	13 – Deas	4 – Ware	Bud Walton Arena (2,253); Fayetteville, AR
December 28, 2025*; 2:00 p.m., SECN+/ESPN+		Arkansas State	L 72–81	11–4	18 – Jones	12 – Deas	4 – Deas	Bud Walton Arena (2,834); Fayetteville, AR
SEC regular season
January 1, 2026; 1:00 p.m., SECN+/ESPN+		No. 12 Vanderbilt	L 71–88	11–5 (0–1)	24 – Jones	8 – Lawrence	2 – Jones	Bud Walton Arena (3,633); Fayetteville, AR
January 4, 2026; 2:00 p.m., SECN+/ESPN+		at Alabama	L 48–77	11–6 (0–2)	9 – Tied	8 – Deas	4 – Robinson	Coleman Coliseum (2,695); Tuscaloosa, AL
January 8, 2026; 6:30 p.m., SECN+/ESPN+		No. 3 South Carolina	L 58–93	11–7 (0–3)	16 – Bates	6 – Lawrence	2 – Tied	Bud Walton Arena (2,963); Fayetteville, AR
January 11, 2026; 1:00 p.m., SECN+/ESPN+		at No. 20 Tennessee	L 50–85	11–8 (0–4)	13 – Bates	9 – Bates	3 – Jones	Thompson–Boling Arena (11,335); Knoxville, TN
January 15, 2026; 6:30 p.m., SECN+/ESPN+		at Missouri	L 69–94	11–9 (0–5)	22 – Jones	6 – Tied	4 – Jones	Mizzou Arena (2,715); Columbia, MO
January 22, 2026; 6:30 p.m., SECN+/ESPN+		Georgia	L 66–76	11–10 (0–6)	17 – Deas	10 – Deas	7 – Robinson	Bud Walton Arena (2,229); Fayetteville, AR
January 25, 2026; 3:00 p.m., SECN		No. 4 Texas	Game postponed to Feb. 19 due to winter storm					Bud Walton Arena; Fayetteville, AR
January 29, 2026; 7:00 p.m., SECN+/ESPN+		at No. 6 LSU	L 70–92	11–11 (0–7)	23 – Jones	7 – Deas	8 – Robinson	Pete Maravich Assembly Center (9,741); Baton Rouge, LA
February 1, 2026; 1:00 p.m., SECN		No. 18 Kentucky	L 73–93	11–12 (0–8)	20 – Robinson	10 – Chlarson	6 – Robinson	Bud Walton Arena (3,074); Fayetteville, AR
February 5, 2026; 6:30 p.m., SECN+/ESPN+		Missouri	L 82–87	11–13 (0–9)	24 – Jones	13 – Deas	7 – Deas	Bud Walton Arena (2,079); Fayetteville, AR
February 8, 2026; 12:00 p.m., SECN		at Florida; Play4Kay	L 69–75	11–14 (0–10)	21 – Robinson	14 – Deas	3 – Robinson	O'Connell Center (1,658); Gainesville, FL
February 12, 2026; 8:00 p.m., SECN		at No. 14 Ole Miss	L 57–80	11–15 (0–11)	16 – Jones	8 – Deas	3 – Mayberry	SJB Pavilion (2,484); Oxford, MS
February 16, 2026; 6:30 p.m., SECN		Mississippi State	L 66–75	11–16 (0–12)	18 – Jones	6 – Deas	2 – Tied	Bud Walton Arena (2,101); Fayetteville, AR
February 19, 2026; 6:30 p.m., SECN+/ESPN+		No. 4 Texas; Rescheduled from Jan. 25	L 62–93	11–17 (0–13)	16 – Jones	10 – Deas	3 – Deas	Bud Walton Arena (2,828); Fayetteville, AR
February 22, 2026; 2:00 p.m., SECN+/ESPN+		Texas A&M	L 57–78	11–18 (0–14)	21 – Jones	9 – Deas	3 – Tied	Bud Walton Arena (3,448); Fayetteville, AR
February 26, 2026; 6:00 p.m., SECN+/ESPN+		at No. 7 Oklahoma	L 44–89	11–19 (0–15)	8 – Deas	7 – Deas	2 – Robinson	Lloyd Noble Center (4,340); Norman, OK
March 1, 2026; 1:00 p.m., SECN		Auburn	W 70–41	12–19 (1–15)	25 – Mayberry	11 – Deas	6 – Deas	Bud Walton Arena (3,670); Fayetteville, AR
SEC Tournament
March 4, 2026; 10:00 a.m., SECN	(16)	vs. (9) No. 17 Kentucky; First Round	L 64–94	12–20	21 – Jones	8 – Deas	3 – Tied	Bon Secours Wellness Arena; Greenville, SC
*Non-conference game. ^{#}Rankings from AP Poll. (#) Tournament seedings in parentheses. All times are in Central Time.

== See also ==
- 2025–26 Arkansas Razorbacks men's basketball team
