= 2025–26 North Carolina Central Eagles women's basketball team =

American college basketball season

2025–26 North Carolina Central Eagles women's basketball
- Conference: Mid-Eastern Athletic Conference
- Record: 9–20 (5–9 MEAC)
- Head coach: Terrence Baxter (3rd season)
- Assistant coaches: Timothy Valentine; Cassie King
- Home arena: McDougald–McLendon Arena

2025–26 MEAC women's basketball standings
	Conf.				Overall
Team	W		L	PCT	W		L	PCT
Howard †	13	–	1	.929	26	–	8	.765
Maryland Eastern Shore	11	–	3	.786	20	–	15	.571
Norfolk State	11	–	3	.786	18	–	15	.545
Coppin State	6	–	8	.429	10	–	23	.303
North Carolina Central	5	–	9	.357	9	–	20	.310
Morgan State	4	–	10	.286	5	–	26	.161
Delaware State	4	–	10	.286	7	–	23	.233
South Carolina State	2	–	12	.143	5	–	25	.167
† 2026 MEAC tournament winner

The 2025–26 North Carolina Central Eagles women's basketball team represented North Carolina Central University during the 2025–26 NCAA Division I women's basketball season. The Eagles, led by third-year head coach Terrence Baxter, played their home games at McDougald–McLendon Arena in Durham, North Carolina as members of the Mid-Eastern Athletic Conference (MEAC).

== Previous season ==
The Eagles finished the 2024–25 season 9–21, 6–8 in MEAC play, to finish in a tie for fifth place. They were defeated by Coppin State in the quarterfinals of the MEAC tournament.

== Preseason ==
On October 8, 2025, the Mid-Eastern Athletic Conference released their preseason poll. North Carolina Central was picked to finish fourth in the conference, receiving one out of a possible 16 first-place votes.

=== Preseason rankings ===
MEAC Preseason Poll
Place	Team	Votes
1	Howard	118 (10)
2	Norfolk State	107 (4)
3	Maryland Eastern Shore	93
4	North Carolina Central	68 (1)
5	Morgan State	62
6	Coppin State	60
7	Delaware State	41
8	South Carolina State	27 (1)
(#) first-place votes

=== MEAC Preseason Player of the Year ===
MEAC Preseason Player of the Year
Player	Position	Year
Morgan Callahan	Forward	Graduate Student

=== Preseason All-MEAC Teams ===
Preseason All-MEAC Teams
Team	Player	Position	Year
First	Morgan Callahan	Forward	Graduate Student
Second	Shakiria Foster	Guard	Sophomore
Third	Aniya Finger	Forward	Graduate Student
Third	Aysia Hinton	Guard	Junior

== Roster ==
2025–26 North Carolina Central Eagles women's basketball team
Players
Coaches

Pos.	#	Name	Height	Year	Previous school	Hometown
G	0	Aysia Hinton	5 ft 8 in (1.73 m)	Jr	Maryland Eastern Shore	Durham, North Carolina
G	2	Victoria Morris	5 ft 9 in (1.75 m)	So	South Pointe High School	Rock Hill, South Carolina
F	3	Morgan Callahan	6 ft 0 in (1.83 m)	GS	Zion-Benton Township High School	Beach Park, Illinois
G	4	Tierney Coleman	5 ft 9 in (1.75 m)	GS	Sam Houston	Marrero, Louisiana
G	5	Nia Young	6 ft 0 in (1.83 m)	RS Sr	Charlotte	Raleigh, North Carolina
G	10	Shakiria Foster	5 ft 8 in (1.73 m)	So	Lamar County High School	Barnesville, Georgia
G	11	Amaya Harris	5 ft 7 in (1.7 m)	Fr	Hillgrove High School	Powder Springs, Georgia
F	12	Aaliyah Grant	6 ft 0 in (1.83 m)	Fr	West Port High School	Ocala, Florida
G	13	Kendall Alexander	5 ft 6 in (1.68 m)	Fr	Walter Johnson High School	Bethesda, Maryland
F	15	Dianna Blake	6 ft 0 in (1.83 m)	So	Ashley Ridge High School	Summerville, South Carolina
G	20	Natalie Jasper	5 ft 5 in (1.65 m)	GS	Boston University	Pittsburgh, Pennsylvania
C	22	Madjiguene Pene	6 ft 5 in (1.96 m)	GS	Shaw	Tivaouane, Senegal
G	23	Najah Lane	5 ft 5 in (1.65 m)	Sr	Delaware State	Charlotte, North Carolina
F	24	Aniya Finger	5 ft 11 in (1.8 m)	GS	Hopewell High School	Charlotte, North Carolina
F	30	TeKeyah Bland	6 ft 1 in (1.85 m)	So	Howard	Pittsboro, North Carolina

Head coach

- Terrence Baxter (Pfeiffer)

Assistant coach(es)

- Timothy Valentine (Southern Wesleyan)
- Cassie King (North Carolina Central)

Legend

- (C) Team captain
- (S) Suspended
- (I) Ineligible
- (W) Walk-on
- Injured
- Current redshirt

Roster
Last update: August 19, 2026

== Schedule and results ==
Date time, TV	Rank^{#}	Opponent^{#}	Result	Record	Site (attendance) city, state
Non-conference regular season
November 3, 2025*; 11:00 am, ACCNX		at No. 11 North Carolina	L 42–90	0–1	Carmichael Arena (6,336); Chapel Hill, NC
November 7, 2025*; 6:30 pm		UNC Wilmington	L 68–78	0–2	McDougald–McLendon Arena (682); Durham, NC
November 13, 2025*; 6:30 pm, ESPN+		UNC Asheville	W 66–53	1–2	McDougald–McLendon Arena (963); Durham, NC
November 18, 2025*; 5:00 pm, ESPN+		Charleston	L 60–75	1–3	McDougald–McLendon Arena (592); Durham, NC
November 20, 2025*; 8:00 pm, ACCN		at Wake Forest	L 65–68	1–4	LJVM Coliseum (966); Winston-Salem, North Carolina
November 23, 2025*; 2:00 pm, ESPN+		at Old Dominion	L 48−85	1−5	Chartway Arena (1,676); Norfolk, VA
November 26, 2025*; 11:00 am		UNC Greensboro	L 47−54	1−6	McDougald–McLendon Arena (163); Durham, NC
December 2, 2025*; 6:30 pm, ESPN+		North Carolina A&T	L 67–73	1–7	McDougald–McLendon Arena (1,641); Durham, NC
December 7, 2025*; 12:00 pm, SECN		at No. 3 South Carolina	L 42–106	1–8	Colonial Life Arena (15,677); Columbia, SC
December 14, 2025*; 2:00 pm, ESPN+		at High Point	L 60–82	1–9	Qubein Center (1,030); High Point, NC
December 17, 2025*; 12:30 pm, ESPN+		at Queens	W 61–51	2–9	Curry Arena (620); Charlotte, NC
December 22, 2025*; 1:00 pm, ESPN+		at No. 8т Oklahoma	L 54–126	2–10	Lloyd Noble Center (3,570); Norman, OK
December 30, 2025*; 2:00 pm		Averett	W 111−48	3−10	McDougald–McLendon Arena (419); Durham, NC
MEAC regular season
January 3, 2026; 2:00 pm, ESPN+		Norfolk State	L 48–68	3–11 (0–1)	McDougald–McLendon Arena (429); Durham, NC
January 8, 2026; 6:00 pm		at Morgan State	L 63–64	3–12 (0–2)	Hill Field House (407); Baltimore, MD
January 10, 2026; 2:00 pm, ESPN+		at Coppin State	L 70–77	3–13 (0–3)	Physical Education Complex (392); Baltimore, MD
January 17, 2026; 2:00 pm, ESPN+		Howard	L 61–69	3–14 (0–4)	McDougald–McLendon Arena (983); Durham, NC
February 2, 2026; 2:00 pm, ESPN+		Maryland Eastern Shore	W 69–62	4–14 (1–4)	McDougald–McLendon Arena (231); Durham, NC
February 3, 2026*; 6:30 pm, ESPN+		William Peace	W 103–51	5–14	McDougald–McLendon Arena (219); Durham, NC
February 7, 2026; 2:00 pm, ESPN+		at Norfolk State	L 45–58	5–15 (1–5)	Echols Hall (642); Norfolk, VA
February 9, 2026; 5:30 pm, ESPN+		Delaware State	W 58–44	6–15 (2–5)	McDougald–McLendon Arena (842); Durham, NC
February 12, 2026; 6:30 pm, ESPN+		Morgan State	W 66–63 ^{OT}	7–15 (3–5)	McDougald–McLendon Arena (942); Durham, NC
February 14, 2026; 2:00 pm, ESPN+		Coppin State	L 68–75	7–16 (3–6)	McDougald–McLendon Arena (639); Durham, NC
February 18, 2026; 5:30 pm, ESPN+		at South Carolina State	W 68–65	8–16 (4–6)	SHM Memorial Center (250); Orangeburg, SC
February 21, 2026; 2:30 pm, ESPN+		at Howard	L 58–66	8–17 (4–7)	Burr Gymnasium (1,121); Washington, D.C.
February 26, 2026; 6:00 pm		at Maryland Eastern Shore	L 55–58	8–18 (4–8)	Hytche Athletic Center (126); Princess Anne, MD
February 28, 2026; 2:00 pm, ESPN+		at Delaware State	L 66–75	8–19 (4–9)	Memorial Hall; Dover, DE
March 5, 2026; 2:00 pm, ESPN+		South Carolina State	W 67–41	9–19 (5–9)	McDougald–McLendon Arena (853); Durham, NC
MEAC tournament
March 12, 2026; 12:00 pm, ESPN+	(5)	vs. (4) Coppin State; Quarterfinals	L 52–70	9–20	Norfolk Scope; Norfolk, VA
*Non-conference game. ^{#}Rankings from AP Poll. (#) Tournament seedings in parentheses. All times are in Eastern.
