= 2025–26 Delaware State Hornets women's basketball team =

American college basketball season

2025–26 Delaware State Hornets women's basketball
- Conference: Mid-Eastern Athletic Conference
- Record: 7–23 (4–10 MEAC)
- Head coach: Jazmone Turner (2nd season)
- Assistant coaches: Matthew Crenshaw; Donchez Graham; Teaunsha Robinson
- Home arena: Memorial Hall

2025–26 MEAC women's basketball standings
	Conf.				Overall
Team	W		L	PCT	W		L	PCT
Howard †	13	–	1	.929	26	–	8	.765
Maryland Eastern Shore	11	–	3	.786	20	–	15	.571
Norfolk State	11	–	3	.786	18	–	15	.545
Coppin State	6	–	8	.429	10	–	23	.303
North Carolina Central	5	–	9	.357	9	–	20	.310
Morgan State	4	–	10	.286	5	–	26	.161
Delaware State	4	–	10	.286	7	–	23	.233
South Carolina State	2	–	12	.143	5	–	25	.167
† 2026 MEAC tournament winner

The 2025–26 Delaware State Hornets women's basketball team represented Delaware State University during the 2025–26 NCAA Division I women's basketball season. The Hornets, led by second-year head coach Jazmone Turner, played their home games at Memorial Hall in Dover, Delaware as members of the Mid-Eastern Athletic Conference (MEAC).

== Previous season ==
The Hornets finished the 2024–25 season 5–24, 1–13 in MEAC play, to finish in a tie for seventh (last) place. They were defeated by Howard in the quarterfinals of the MEAC tournament.

== Preseason ==
On October 8, 2025, the Mid-Eastern Athletic Conference released their preseason poll. Delaware State was picked to finish seventh in the conference.

=== Preseason rankings ===
MEAC Preseason Poll
Place	Team	Votes
1	Howard	118 (10)
2	Norfolk State	107 (4)
3	Maryland Eastern Shore	93
4	North Carolina Central	68 (1)
5	Morgan State	62
6	Coppin State	60
7	Delaware State	41
8	South Carolina State	27 (1)
(#) first-place votes

=== Preseason All-MEAC Teams ===
Preseason All-MEAC Teams
Team	Player	Position	Year
Second	Ericka Huggins	Forward	Sophomore

== Roster ==
2025–26 Delaware State Hornets women's basketball team
Players
Coaches

Pos.	#	Name	Height	Year	Previous school	Hometown
PG	1	Amya Scott	5 ft 3 in (1.6 m)	Fr	Neumann Goretti High School	Philadelphia, Pennsylvania
SG	2	Channing Williams	5 ft 8 in (1.73 m)	Jr	Temple	Bowie, Maryland
G	3	Jermesha Frierson	5 ft 7 in (1.7 m)	Jr	Northwestern State	Shreveport, Louisiana
F	4	Anise Geiger	6 ft 1 in (1.85 m)	Fr	Imhotep Institute Charter High School	Philadelphia, Pennsylvania
PG	5	Nykesha Sanders	5 ft 7 in (1.7 m)	GS	East Texas A&M	Detroit, Michigan
SG	7	Nevaeh Reaves	5 ft 6 in (1.68 m)	GS	Walnut Ridge High School	Columbus, Ohio
F	10	Ericka Huggins	6 ft 0 in (1.83 m)	So	St. Elizabeth High School	Wilmington, Delaware
SG	11	Aniyah Jones	5 ft 9 in (1.75 m)	Sr	Limestone	Grovetown, Georgia
G	14	Mahogany Cottingham	5 ft 9 in (1.75 m)	Jr	North Dakota	Cleveland, Ohio
PG	20	Layla Burton	5 ft 5 in (1.65 m)	Fr	Parkdale High School	Prince George's County, Maryland
F	21	Kaitlyn Adams	5 ft 10 in (1.78 m)	Jr	Queens	Zebulon, North Carolina
F	24	Iman Addison	6 ft 0 in (1.83 m)	Sr	Valley Christian School	San Jose, California
G	30	Toni Smith	5 ft 9 in (1.75 m)	Fr	Baldwin High School	Baldwin, New York
PF	40	Liliana Harrison	6 ft 2 in (1.88 m)	Fr	Lebanon High School	Lebanon, Pennsylvania

Head coach

- Jazmone Turner (Muskingum)

Assistant coach(es)

- Matthew Crenshaw (IUPUI)
- Donchez Graham (Morgan State)
- Teaunsha Robinson (Bowie State)

Legend

- (C) Team captain
- (S) Suspended
- (I) Ineligible
- (W) Walk-on
- Injured
- Current redshirt

Roster
Last update: August 21, 2026

== Schedule and results ==
Date time, TV	Rank^{#}	Opponent^{#}	Result	Record	Site (attendance) city, state
Non-conference regular season
November 5, 2025*; 5:30 pm		Felician	W 66–55	1–0	Memorial Hall (355); Dover, DE
November 8, 2025*; 6:00 pm, ESPN+		at American	L 63–66	1–1	Bender Arena (537); Washington, D.C.
November 10, 2025*; 6:00 pm		Penn	L 41–63	1–2	Memorial Hall (175); Dover, DE
November 12, 2025*; 11:00 am		Bloomfield	W 74–58	2–2	Memorial Hall (1,300); Dover, DE
November 15, 2025*; 5:30 pm, ESPN+		LIU	L 56–70	2–3	Memorial Hall (257); Dover, DE
November 19, 2025*; 7:00 pm, NECFR		at Fairleigh Dickinson	L 41−72	2−4	Bogota Savings Bank Center (400); Hackensack, NJ
November 22, 2025*; 5:30 pm, ESPN+		St. Mary's (MD)	W 83−38	3−4	Memorial Hall (300); Dover, DE
November 24, 2025*; 7:00 pm, FloCollege		at Hampton	L 59–76	3–5	Hampton Convocation Center (478); Hampton, VA
December 1, 2025*; 6:30 pm, ESPN+		at Old Dominion	L 45–68	3–6	Chartway Arena (1,578); Norfolk, VA
December 7, 2025*; 1:00 pm, ESPN+		at UCF	L 46–74	3–7	Addition Financial Arena (1,236); Orlando, FL
December 10, 2025*; 6:00 pm, B1G+		at No. 7 Maryland	L 21–91	3–8	Xfinity Center (5,340); College Park, MD
December 13, 2025*; 12:00 pm, ESPN+		at Georgetown	L 46–60	3–9	McDonough Arena (1,103); Washington, D.C.
December 20, 2025*; 1:00 pm, ESPN+		at Tulane; Tulane Holiday Tournament	L 44−76	3−10	Devlin Fieldhouse (691); New Orleans, LA
December 21, 2025*; 11:00 am		vs. Detroit Mercy; Tulane Holiday Tournament	L 46–59	3–11	Devlin Fieldhouse (535); New Orleans, LA
December 29, 2025*; 2:00 pm, ESPN+		NJIT	L 62–75	3–12	Memorial Hall (56); Dover, DE
MEAC regular season
January 3, 2026; 2:00 pm, ESPN+		Coppin State	L 59–60	3–13 (0–1)	Memorial Hall (175); Dover, DE
January 8, 2026; 6:00 pm, ESPN+		at Howard	L 63–73	3–14 (0–2)	Burr Gymnasium (582); Washington, D.C.
January 10, 2026; 2:00 pm, ESPN+		Norfolk State	L 53–69	3–15 (0–3)	Memorial Hall; Dover, DE
January 17, 2026; 2:00 pm, ESPN+		Morgan State	L 59–61	3–16 (0–4)	Memorial Hall (239); Dover, DE
January 22, 2026; 7:00 pm, ESPN+		at South Carolina State	W 67–47	4–16 (1–4)	SHM Memorial Center (275); Orangeburg, SC
January 31, 2026; 2:00 pm, ESPN+		Maryland Eastern Shore	L 47–58	4–17 (1–5)	Memorial Hall; Dover, DE
February 7, 2026; 2:00 pm, ESPN+		at Coppin State	L 59–83	4–18 (1–6)	Physical Education Complex (259); Baltimore, MD
February 9, 2026; 5:30 pm, ESPN+		at North Carolina Central	L 44–58	4–19 (1–7)	McDougald–McLendon Arena (842); Durham, NC
February 12, 2026; 6:00 pm, ESPN+		Howard	L 51–68	4–20 (1–8)	Memorial Hall (138); Dover, DE
February 14, 2026; 2:00 pm, ESPN+		at Norfolk State	L 45–77	4–21 (1–9)	Echols Hall (1,148); Norfolk, VA
February 21, 2026; 2:00 pm, ESPN+		at Morgan State	W 74–59	5–21 (2–9)	Hill Field House (753); Baltimore, MD
February 26, 2026; 6:00 pm, ESPN+		South Carolina State	W 71–38	6–21 (3–9)	Memorial Hall (300); Dover, DE
February 28, 2026; 2:00 pm, ESPN+		North Carolina Central	W 75–66	7–21 (4–9)	Memorial Hall; Dover, DE
March 5, 2026; 5:30 pm, DSN		at Maryland Eastern Shore	L 48–56	7–22 (4–10)	Hytche Athletic Center (1,035); Princess Anne, MD
MEAC tournament
March 11, 2026; 2:00 pm, ESPN+	(7)	vs. (2) Maryland Eastern Shore; Quarterfinals	L 48–55	7–23	Norfolk Scope; Norfolk, VA
*Non-conference game. ^{#}Rankings from AP Poll. (#) Tournament seedings in parentheses. All times are in Eastern.
