= 2025–26 Norfolk State Spartans women's basketball team =

American college basketball season

2025–26 Norfolk State Spartans women's basketball
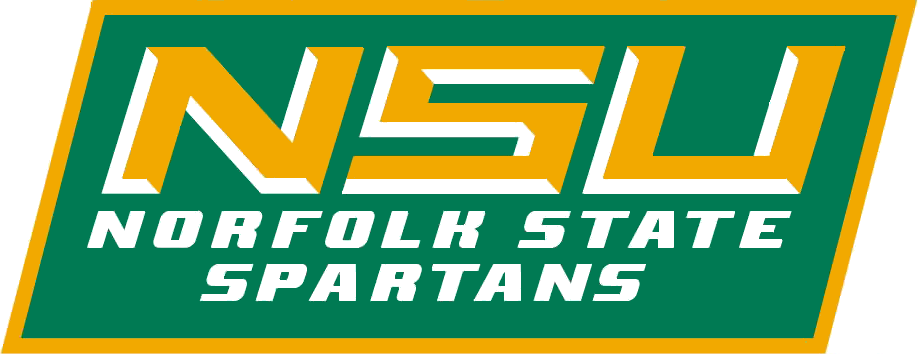

WNIT, First Round
- Conference: Mid-Eastern Athletic Conference
- Record: 18–15 (11–3 MEAC)
- Head coach: Jermaine Woods (1st season)
- Associate head coach: Lindsey Payton
- Assistant coaches: Asia Williams; Chanette Hicks; Mossi Staples; Brandon Plummer
- Home arena: Echols Hall

2025–26 MEAC women's basketball standings
	Conf.				Overall
Team	W		L	PCT	W		L	PCT
Howard †	13	–	1	.929	26	–	8	.765
Maryland Eastern Shore	11	–	3	.786	20	–	15	.571
Norfolk State	11	–	3	.786	18	–	15	.545
Coppin State	6	–	8	.429	10	–	23	.303
North Carolina Central	5	–	9	.357	9	–	20	.310
Morgan State	4	–	10	.286	5	–	26	.161
Delaware State	4	–	10	.286	7	–	23	.233
South Carolina State	2	–	12	.143	5	–	25	.167
† 2026 MEAC tournament winner

The 2025–26 Norfolk State Spartans women's basketball team represented Norfolk State University during the 2025–26 NCAA Division I women's basketball season. The Spartans, led by first-year head coach Jermaine Woods, played their home games at Echols Hall in Norfolk, Virginia as members of the Mid-Eastern Athletic Conference (MEAC).

== Previous season ==
The Spartans finished the 2024–25 season 30–5, and a perfect 14–0 in MEAC play, to finish as MEAC regular season champions. They defeated South Carolina State, Coppin State, and Howard to win the MEAC tournament championship, sending the Spartans to their third consecutive NCAA tournament appearance. In the tournament, they would receive the No. 13 seed in the Birmingham Regional 2, where they would be defeated by the No. 4 region seed Maryland in the First Round.

Just a day after their NCAA tournament exit, on March 23, 2025, it was announced that head coach Larry Vickers would be leaving the program, after nine seasons, in order to take the head coaching position at Auburn. On April 4, the school announced that they would be hiring Coppin State head coach and Norfolk State alum Jermaine Woods as the team's next head coach.

== Preseason ==
On October 8, 2025, the Mid-Eastern Athletic Conference released their preseason poll. Norfolk State was picked to finish second in the conference, receiving four out of a possible 16 first-place votes.

=== Preseason rankings ===
MEAC Preseason Poll
Place	Team	Votes
1	Howard	118 (10)
2	Norfolk State	107 (4)
3	Maryland Eastern Shore	93
4	North Carolina Central	68 (1)
5	Morgan State	62
6	Coppin State	60
7	Delaware State	41
8	South Carolina State	27 (1)
(#) first-place votes

=== Preseason All-MEAC Teams ===
Preseason All-MEAC Teams
Team	Player	Position	Year
First	Anjanae Richardson	Guard	Junior
Second	Da'Brya Clark	Guard	Junior
Second	Jasha Clinton	Guard	Graduate Student
Third	Jazmine Spencer	Guard	Graduate Student

== Roster ==
2025–26 Norfolk State Spartans women's basketball team
Players
Coaches

Pos.	#	Name	Height	Year	Previous school	Hometown
G	1	Da'Brya Clark	5 ft 7 in (1.7 m)	Jr	Baltimore Polytechnic Institute	Baltimore, Maryland
G	2	Jazmine Spencer	5 ft 6 in (1.68 m)	GS	North Florida	Bartow, Florida
G	3	Jasha Clinton	5 ft 8 in (1.73 m)	GS	Hampton	Virginia Beach, Virginia
G	4	Anjanae Richardson	5 ft 8 in (1.73 m)	Jr	Manor High School	Portsmouth, Virginia
F	5	Iyanna Rogers	6 ft 2 in (1.88 m)	GS	Penn	Richmond, Virginia
G	7	Cire Worley	6 ft 0 in (1.83 m)	Jr	Coppin State	Philadelphia, Pennsylvania
G	11	Amari Smith	5 ft 10 in (1.78 m)	Jr	Morgan State	Newport News, Virginia
G	14	Jenesis Hill	5 ft 10 in (1.78 m)	Jr	Landstown High School	Virginia Beach, Virginia
F	15	Carmen Kweti	6 ft 0 in (1.83 m)	Sr	Virginia State	Frederick, Maryland
G	20	Niyah Gaston	5 ft 10 in (1.78 m)	Jr	Coppin State	Suffolk, Virginia
C	24	LeAire Nicks	6 ft 2 in (1.88 m)	So	George Mason	Des Moines, Iowa
F	25	Ciara Bailey	6 ft 2 in (1.88 m)	Sr	Harcum College	Bristol, Pennsylvania

Head coach

- Jermaine Woods (Norfolk State)

Assistant coach(es)

- Lindsey Payton (Arizona Christian)
- Asia Williams (Wake Forest)
- Chanette Hicks (Norfolk State)
- Mossi Staples (Coppin State)
- Brandon Plummer (Virginia State)

Legend

- (C) Team captain
- (S) Suspended
- (I) Ineligible
- (W) Walk-on
- Injured
- Current redshirt

Roster
Last update: August 14, 2026

== Schedule and results ==
Date time, TV	Rank^{#}	Opponent^{#}	Result	Record	Site (attendance) city, state
Non-conference regular season
November 3, 2025*; 12:00 pm, SECN		at No. 12 Ole Miss	L 46–87	0–1	SJB Pavilion (8,030); Oxford, MS
November 6, 2025*; 6:00 pm		District of Columbia	W 85–39	1–1	Echols Hall (59); Norfolk, VA
November 9, 2025*; 4:30 pm, ESPN+		Virginia State	W 77–53	2–1	Echols Hall (984); Norfolk, VA
November 12, 2025*; 7:00 pm, ACCNX		at No. 15 Duke	L 32–83	2–2	Cameron Indoor Stadium (2,140); Durham, NC
November 16, 2025*; 2:00 pm, ESPN+		at No. 16 Iowa State	L 52−98	2−3	Hilton Coliseum (9,145); Ames, IA
November 18, 2025*; 6:00 pm, ESPN+		at Penn	L 50−55	2−4	The Palestra (206); Philadelphia, PA
November 21, 2025*; 5:30 pm, ESPN+		Hampton; Battle of the Bay	L 55–57	2–5	Echols Hall (2,001); Norfolk, VA
November 25, 2025*; 12:00 pm, ESPN+		at Appalachian State	L 38–66	2–6	Holmes Center (2,035); Boone, NC
December 1, 2025*; 6:00 pm, ESPN+		Shaw	W 86–48	3–6	Echols Hall (318); Norfolk, VA
December 6, 2025*; 12:00 pm, FloCollege		at North Carolina A&T	W 63–50	4–6	Corbett Sports Center (1,074); Greensboro, NC
December 8, 2025*; 7:00 pm, ACCNX		at Georgia Tech	L 57–72	4–7	McCamish Pavilion (1,575); Atlanta, GA
December 11, 2025*; 11:00 am, ESPN+		Dillard	W 100−54	5−7	Echols Hall (3,124); Norfolk, VA
December 15, 2025*; 7:00 pm, FloCollege		at Campbell	L 63–68	5–8	Gore Arena (324); Buies Creek, NC
December 18, 2025*; 6:30 pm, B1G+		at No. 21 Ohio State	L 45–79	5–9	Value City Arena (4,816); Columbus, OH
December 21, 2025*; 1:00 pm, FloCollege		at Elon	L 41–58	5–10	Schar Center (461); Elon, NC
MEAC regular season
January 3, 2026; 2:00 pm, ESPN+		at North Carolina Central	W 68–48	6–10 (1–0)	McDougald–McLendon Arena (429); Durham, NC
January 8, 2026; 6:00 pm, ESPN+		Maryland Eastern Shore	L 60–63	6–11 (1–1)	Echols Hall (564); Norfolk, VA
January 10, 2026; 2:00 pm, ESPN+		at Delaware State	W 69–53	7–11 (2–1)	Memorial Hall; Dover, DE
January 17, 2026; 2:00 pm, ESPN+		at South Carolina State	W 85–41	8–11 (3–1)	SHM Memorial Center (342); Orangeburg, SC
January 22, 2026; 6:00 pm, ESPN+		Morgan State	W 78–52	9–11 (4–1)	Echols Hall (752); Norfolk, VA
January 24, 2026; 11:00 am		Coppin State	W 69–58	10–11 (5–1)	Echols Hall (111); Norfolk, VA
January 31, 2026; 1:00 pm, ESPN+		at Howard	L 59–68	10–12 (5–2)	Burr Gymnasium (1,167); Washington, D.C.
February 7, 2026; 2:00 pm, ESPN+		North Carolina Central	W 58–45	11–12 (6–2)	Echols Hall (642); Norfolk, VA
February 12, 2026; 6:00 pm, DSN		at Maryland Eastern Shore	W 57–51	12–12 (7–2)	Hytche Athletic Center (700); Princess Anne, MD
February 14, 2026; 2:00 pm, ESPN+		Delaware State	W 77–45	13–12 (8–2)	Echols Hall (1,148); Norfolk, VA
February 21, 2026; 1:00 pm, ESPN+		South Carolina State	W 93–52	14–12 (9–2)	Echols Hall; Norfolk, VA
February 26, 2026; 6:00 pm		at Morgan State	W 69–60	15–12 (10–2)	Hill Field House (426); Baltimore, MD
February 28, 2026; 2:00 pm, ESPN+		at Coppin State	W 73–34	16–12 (11–2)	Physical Education Complex (268); Baltimore, MD
March 5, 2026; 5:30 pm, ESPN+		Howard	L 59–74	16–13 (11–3)	Echols Hall (3,419); Norfolk, VA
MEAC tournament
March 12, 2026; 2:00 pm, ESPN+	(3)	vs. (6) Morgan State; Quarterfinals	W 69–43	17–13	Norfolk Scope; Norfolk, VA
March 13, 2026; 2:00 pm, ESPN+	(3)	vs. (2) Maryland Eastern Shore; Semifinals	W 60–51	18–13	Norfolk Scope; Norfolk, VA
March 14, 2026; 4:00 pm, ESPNews	(3)	vs. (1) Howard; Championship	L 46–53	18–14	Norfolk Scope; Norfolk, VA
WNIT
March 21, 2026*; 2:00 pm, ESPN+		Loyola Chicago; First Round	L 54–58	18–15	Echols Hall (575); Norfolk, VA
*Non-conference game. ^{#}Rankings from AP Poll. (#) Tournament seedings in parentheses. All times are in Eastern.
