= 2026 MEAC women's basketball tournament =

American college basketball tournament

- Classification: Division I
- Season: 2025–26
- Teams: 8
- Site: Norfolk Scope; Norfolk, Virginia
- Champions: Howard (12th title)
- Winning coach: Ty Grace (2nd title)
- Television: ESPN+ and ESPNews

2025–26 MEAC women's basketball standings
	Conf.				Overall
Team	W		L	PCT	W		L	PCT
Howard †	13	–	1	.929	26	–	8	.765
Maryland Eastern Shore	11	–	3	.786	20	–	15	.571
Norfolk State	11	–	3	.786	18	–	15	.545
Coppin State	6	–	8	.429	10	–	23	.303
North Carolina Central	5	–	9	.357	9	–	20	.310
Morgan State	4	–	10	.286	5	–	26	.161
Delaware State	4	–	10	.286	7	–	23	.233
South Carolina State	2	–	12	.143	5	–	25	.167
† 2026 MEAC tournament winner

The 2026 MEAC women's basketball tournament was the postseason women's basketball tournament for the 2025–26 season in the Mid-Eastern Athletic Conference (MEAC). The tournament was held March 11–14, 2026, at the Norfolk Scope in Norfolk, Virginia. The tournament winner will receive the conference's automatic invitation to the 2026 NCAA Division I women's basketball tournament.

== Seeds ==
All of the conference's eight members were eligible for the tournament and will be seeded by record that was within the conference games that were played, with a tiebreaker system to seed teams with identical conference records.

Seed	School	Conference	Tiebreaker
1	Howard	13–1	
2	Maryland Eastern Shore	11–3	1–1 vs. Howard
3	Norfolk State	11–3	0–2 vs. Howard
4	Coppin State	6–8	
5	North Carolina Central	5–9	
6	Morgan State	4–10	1–1 vs. Coppin State
7	Delaware State	4–10	0–2 vs. Coppin State
8	South Carolina State	2–12	

== Schedule ==
Game	Time*	Matchup^{#}	Score	Television
Quarterfinals – Wednesday, March 11
1	Noon	No. 1 Howard vs No. 8 South Carolina State	75–43	ESPN+
2	2:00 p.m.	No. 2 Maryland Eastern Shore vs No. 7 Delaware State	55–48	ESPN+
Quarterfinals – Thursday, March 12
3	Noon	No. 4 Coppin State vs. No. 5 North Carolina Central	70–52	ESPN+
4	2:00 p.m.	No. 3 Norfolk State vs. No. 6 Morgan State	69–43	ESPN+
Semifinals – Friday, March 13
5	Noon	No. 1 Howard vs. No. 4 Coppin State	65–50	ESPN+
6	2:00 p.m.	No. 2 Maryland Eastern Shore vs. No. 3 Norfolk State	51–60	ESPN+
Championship – Saturday, March 14
7	4:00 p.m.	No. 1 Howard vs. No. 3 Norfolk State	53–46	ESPNews
*Game times in EST. #-Rankings denote tournament seeding.

== Bracket ==
Quarterfinals; March 11–12; ESPN+
1	Howard	75
8	South Carolina State	43
4	Coppin State	70
5	North Carolina Central	52
2	Maryland Eastern Shore	55
7	Delaware State	48
3	Norfolk State	69
6	Morgan State	43

Semifinals; March 13; ESPN+
1	Howard	65
4	Coppin State	50
2	Maryland Eastern Shore	51
3	Norfolk State	60

Championship; March 14; ESPNews
1	Howard	53
3	Norfolk State	46
