= 2025–26 South Carolina State Lady Bulldogs basketball team =

American college basketball season

2025–26 South Carolina State Lady Bulldogs basketball
- Conference: Mid-Eastern Athletic Conference
- Record: 5–25 (2–12 MEAC)
- Head coach: Cedric W. Baker (1st season)
- Assistant coach: Terrance Chatman
- Home arena: SHM Memorial Center

2025–26 MEAC women's basketball standings
	Conf.				Overall
Team	W		L	PCT	W		L	PCT
Howard †	13	–	1	.929	26	–	8	.765
Maryland Eastern Shore	11	–	3	.786	20	–	15	.571
Norfolk State	11	–	3	.786	18	–	15	.545
Coppin State	6	–	8	.429	10	–	23	.303
North Carolina Central	5	–	9	.357	9	–	20	.310
Morgan State	4	–	10	.286	5	–	26	.161
Delaware State	4	–	10	.286	7	–	23	.233
South Carolina State	2	–	12	.143	5	–	25	.167
† 2026 MEAC tournament winner

The 2025–26 South Carolina State Lady Bulldogs basketball team represented South Carolina State University during the 2025–26 NCAA Division I women's basketball season. The Lady Bulldogs, led by first-year head coach Cedric W. Baker, played their home games at SHM Memorial Center in Orangeburg, South Carolina as members of the Mid-Eastern Athletic Conference (MEAC).

== Previous season ==
The Lady Bulldogs finished the 2024–25 season 2–29, 1–13 in MEAC play, to finish in a tie for seventh (last) place. They were defeated by top-seeded and eventual tournament champions Norfolk State in the quarterfinals of the MEAC tournament.

Following the season, on May 2, 2025 head coach Tim Eatman announced his resignation, ending his two-year tenure with the team. On May 14, it was announced that longtime Savannah State head coach Cedric W. Baker would be leaving the Savannah State program, in order to take the South Carolina State head coaching position.

== Preseason ==
On October 8, 2025, the Mid-Eastern Athletic Conference released their preseason poll. South Carolina State was picked to finish eighth (last) in the conference, receiving one out of a possible 16 first-place votes.

=== Preseason rankings ===
MEAC Preseason Poll
Place	Team	Votes
1	Howard	118 (10)
2	Norfolk State	107 (4)
3	Maryland Eastern Shore	93
4	North Carolina Central	68 (1)
5	Morgan State	62
6	Coppin State	60
7	Delaware State	41
8	South Carolina State	27 (1)
(#) first-place votes

=== Preseason All-MEAC Teams ===
No players were named to Preseason All-MEAC First, Second or Third Teams.

== Roster ==
2025–26 South Carolina State Lady Bulldogs women's basketball team
Players
Coaches

Pos.	#	Name	Height	Year	Previous school	Hometown
G	0	Janiah Hinton	5 ft 7 in (1.7 m)	Sr	Saltillo High School	Tupelo, Mississippi
G	1	Mya Giles	5 ft 6 in (1.68 m)	So	Trinity Valley Community College	Columbus, Georgia
G	2	Mya Byrd	5 ft 7 in (1.7 m)	Sr	Savannah State	Ashburn, Georgia
F	3	Monajah Ford	5 ft 11 in (1.8 m)	Jr	Discovery High School	Winter Haven, Florida
F	5	Alexcia Murphy	5 ft 10 in (1.78 m)	So	Cowley	West Point, Georgia
C	6	Feliah Greer	5 ft 9 in (1.75 m)	Sr	Miles College	LaFayette, Alabama
G	7	Dream Watson	5 ft 6 in (1.68 m)	Fr	Military Magnet Academy	Charleston, South Carolina
F	8	Kimora Smith	5 ft 10 in (1.78 m)	So	St. Francis Prep	Queens, New York
G	9	Angie Juste-Jean	5 ft 10 in (1.78 m)	Sr	Coastal Carolina	Montreal, Quebec
G	10	Iemyiah Harris	5 ft 6 in (1.68 m)	Sr	Miles College	Anniston, Alabama
G	13	DaH'Neisha Blige	5 ft 7 in (1.7 m)	Jr	East Georgia State College	Savannah, Georgia
G	14	Shaunice Reed	5 ft 6 in (1.68 m)	Sr	Cochise College	Seattle, Washington
F	15	Terrannya Medlock	6 ft 0 in (1.83 m)	Fr	Ribault High School	Jacksonville, Florida
F	21	Jhaven Meade	6 ft 4 in (1.93 m)	Jr	Franklin County High School	Frankfort, Kentucky
F	22	Ja'Siiyah Holmes	6 ft 3 in (1.91 m)	RS Jr	Savannah State	Augusta, Georgia
G	23	Ariana Simmons	5 ft 7 in (1.7 m)	Sr	Alabama State	Charlotte, North Carolina
C	24	Heaven Harper	6 ft 3 in (1.91 m)	Jr	Monsignor Scanlan High School	Bronx, New York
C	33	Bianca Glover	6 ft 3 in (1.91 m)	Sr	CCBC Essex	Jersey City, New Jersey

Head coach

- Cedric W. Baker (Voorhees)

Assistant coach(es)

- Terrance Chatman (UMKC)

Legend

- (C) Team captain
- (S) Suspended
- (I) Ineligible
- (W) Walk-on
- Injured
- Current redshirt

Roster
Last update: September 8, 2026

== Schedule and results ==
Date time, TV	Rank^{#}	Opponent^{#}	Result	Record	Site (attendance) city, state
Non-conference regular season
November 5, 2025*; 7:00 pm		Morris	W 102–34	1–0	SHM Memorial Center (195); Orangeburg, SC
November 11, 2025*; 7:00 pm		TCJ	W 108–42	2–0	SHM Memorial Center (125); Orangeburg, SC
November 13, 2025*; 7:00 pm		Georgia	L 49–85	2–1	SHM Memorial Center (345); Orangeburg, SC
November 17, 2025*; 7:00 pm, ESPN+		at USC Upstate	L 69–78	2–2	G. B. Hodge Center (349); Spartanburg, SC
November 20, 2025*; 7:00 pm		Queens	L 65–76	2–3	SHM Memorial Center (150); Orangeburg, SC
November 22, 2025*; 6:00 pm, ESPN+		at Charleston Southern	L 51−53	2−4	Buccaneer Field House (862); North Charleston, SC
November 24, 2025*; 6:00 pm, ESPN+		at UCF	L 49−94	2−5	Addition Financial Arena (1,119); Orlando, FL
November 30, 2025*; 4:00 pm		Winthrop	L 45–66	2–6	SHM Memorial Center (175); Orangeburg, SC
December 3, 2025*; 11:30 am, ESPN+		at UNC Asheville	L 58–64 ^{OT}	2–7	Kimmel Arena (1,612); Asheville, NC
December 5, 2025*; 11:30 am		High Point	L 44–64	2–8	Tullis Arena (65); Orangeburg, SC
December 7, 2025*; 4:00 pm		West Georgia	W 69–62	3–8	SHM Memorial Center (100); Orangeburg, SC
December 12, 2025*; 7:00 pm		at Alabama State	L 53–59	3–9	Dunn–Oliver Acadome (372); Montgomery, AL
December 14, 2025*; 3:00 pm, SECN+		at No. 17 Ole Miss	L 32−91	3−10	SJB Pavilion (2,655); Oxford, MS
December 20, 2025*; 2:00 pm, ACCNX		at Florida State	L 41–89	3–11	Donald L. Tucker Center (1,225); Tallahassee, FL
December 22, 2025*; 2:00 pm, ESPN+		at UNC Greensboro	L 32–77	3–12	Bodford Arena (174); Greensboro, NC
MEAC regular season
January 3, 2026; 2:00 pm		Howard	L 64–68	3–13 (0–1)	SHM Memorial Center (275); Orangeburg, SC
January 8, 2026; 7:00 pm, ESPN+		at Coppin State	W 58–47	4–13 (1–1)	Physical Education Complex (236); Baltimore, MD
January 10, 2026; 2:00 pm, ESPN+		at Morgan State	W 62–59	5–13 (2–1)	Hill Field House (302); Baltimore, MD
January 17, 2026; 2:00 pm, ESPN+		Norfolk State	L 41–85	5–14 (2–2)	SHM Memorial Center (342); Orangeburg, SC
January 22, 2026; 7:00 pm, ESPN+		Delaware State	L 47–67	5–15 (2–3)	SHM Memorial Center (275); Orangeburg, SC
February 4, 2026; 5:30 pm, ESPN+		Maryland Eastern Shore	L 53–73	5–16 (2–4)	SHM Memorial Center (250); Orangeburg, SC
February 7, 2026; 2:00 pm, ESPN+		at Howard	L 66–85	5–17 (2–5)	Burr Gymnasium; Washington, D.C.
February 12, 2026; 7:00 pm, ESPN+		Coppin State	L 39–72	5–18 (2–6)	SHM Memorial Center (150); Orangeburg, SC
February 16, 2026; 2:00 pm, ESPN+		Morgan State	L 47–73	5–19 (2–7)	SHM Memorial Center (100); Orangeburg, SC
February 18, 2026; 5:30 pm, ESPN+		North Carolina Central	L 65–68	5–20 (2–8)	SHM Memorial Center (250); Orangeburg, SC
February 21, 2026; 1:00 pm		at Norfolk State	L 52–93	5–21 (2–9)	Echols Hall; Norfolk, VA
February 26, 2026; 6:00 pm, ESPN+		at Delaware State	L 38–71	5–22 (2–10)	Memorial Hall (300); Dover, DE
February 28, 2026; 2:00 pm, DSN		at Maryland Eastern Shore	L 33–74	5–23 (2–11)	Hytche Athletic Center (220); Princess Anne, MD
March 5, 2026; 2:00 pm		at North Carolina Central	L 41–67	5–24 (2–12)	McDougald–McLendon Arena (853); Durham, NC
MEAC tournament
March 11, 2026; 12:00 pm, ESPN+	(8)	vs. (1) Howard; Quarterfinals	L 43–75	5–25	Norfolk Scope; Norfolk, VA
*Non-conference game. ^{#}Rankings from AP Poll. (#) Tournament seedings in parentheses. All times are in Eastern.
