= 2025–26 Coppin State Eagles women's basketball team =

American college basketball season

2025–26 Coppin State Eagles women's basketball
- Conference: Mid-Eastern Athletic Conference
- Record: 10–23 (6–8 MEAC)
- Head coach: Darrell Mosley (1st season)
- Assistant coaches: Shemika Jones; Kevin Green; Tatyana McClaney; Taleah 'Noo' Washington
- Home arena: Physical Education Complex

2025–26 MEAC women's basketball standings
	Conf.				Overall
Team	W		L	PCT	W		L	PCT
Howard †	13	–	1	.929	26	–	8	.765
Maryland Eastern Shore	11	–	3	.786	20	–	15	.571
Norfolk State	11	–	3	.786	18	–	15	.545
Coppin State	6	–	8	.429	10	–	23	.303
North Carolina Central	5	–	9	.357	9	–	20	.310
Morgan State	4	–	10	.286	5	–	26	.161
Delaware State	4	–	10	.286	7	–	23	.233
South Carolina State	2	–	12	.143	5	–	25	.167
† 2026 MEAC tournament winner

The 2025–26 Coppin State Eagles women's basketball team represented Coppin State University during the 2025–26 NCAA Division I women's basketball season. The Eagles, led by first-year head coach Darrell Mosley, played their home games at the Physical Education Complex in Baltimore, Maryland as members of the Mid-Eastern Athletic Conference (MEAC).

== Previous season ==
The Eagles finished the 2024–25 season 19–15, 8–6 in MEAC play, to finish in a tie for third place. They defeated North Carolina Central, before falling to top-seeded and eventual tournament champions Norfolk State in the semifinals of the MEAC tournament. They received an at-large bid to the WNIT, where they would defeat Colgate in the first round, before falling to Cleveland State in the second round.

Following the season, on April 4, 2025, it was announced that head coach Jermaine Woods would be leaving the program after three seasons, in order to take the head coaching job at his alma mater, Norfolk State. On April 14, the school announced that they would be hiring Arizona State associate head coach Darrell Mosley as the team's next head coach.

== Preseason ==
On October 8, 2025, the Mid-Eastern Athletic Conference released their preseason poll. Coppin State was picked to finish sixth in the conference.

=== Preseason rankings ===
MEAC Preseason Poll
Place	Team	Votes
1	Howard	118 (10)
2	Norfolk State	107 (4)
3	Maryland Eastern Shore	93
4	North Carolina Central	68 (1)
5	Morgan State	62
6	Coppin State	60
7	Delaware State	41
8	South Carolina State	27 (1)
(#) first-place votes

=== Preseason All-MEAC Teams ===
No players were named to Preseason All-MEAC First, Second or Third Teams.

== Roster ==
2025–26 Coppin State Eagles women's basketball team
Players
Coaches

Pos.	#	Name	Height	Year	Previous school	Hometown
G	0	Paris McBride	5 ft 6 in (1.68 m)	Sr	Morehead State	Richmond, Virginia
G	2	Jordyn Adderly	5 ft 10 in (1.78 m)	Fr	Friends' Central School	Philadelphia, Pennsylvania
G	3	Kylie Wells	5 ft 11 in (1.8 m)	Fr	Merrillville High School	Crown Point, Indiana
G	4	Seimone Newton	5 ft 11 in (1.8 m)	Fr	Cosby High School	Midlothian, Virginia
G	5	Skylar Barnes	5 ft 9 in (1.75 m)	Sr	Southeast Missouri State	St. Louis, Missouri
G	10	Kyley Gary-Grayson	5 ft 8 in (1.73 m)	Fr	West Orange High School	West Orange, New Jersey
G	11	Jahcelyn Hartfield	5 ft 11 in (1.8 m)	Sr	North Texas	Grand Prairie, Texas
G	12	Mickelle Lowry	5 ft 6 in (1.68 m)	So	Baltimore Polytechnic Institute	Baltimore, Maryland
F	14	Princess Nwachukwu	6 ft 1 in (1.85 m)	Fr	Vel Phillips Memorial High School	Madison, Wisconsin
G	20	Erin Henry	5 ft 8 in (1.73 m)	Jr	Wabash Valley College	Joliet, Illinois
F	21	Sydney Burris	6 ft 0 in (1.83 m)	Sr	UNC Asheville	Milwaukee, Wisconsin
F	23	Jada Collins	6 ft 2 in (1.88 m)	So	Tennessee State	Kalamazoo, Michigan
G	24	Khila Morris	5 ft 11 in (1.8 m)	Sr	Troy	Bronx, New York
F	25	Shanaii Gamble	6 ft 0 in (1.83 m)	So	LIU	Florida City, Florida
C	44	Patricia Sosa Lora	6 ft 2 in (1.88 m)	Sr	Xavier (LA)	Santo Domingo, Dominican Republic

Head coach

- Darrell Mosley (Lincoln (PA))

Assistant coach(es)

- Shemika Jones (Johnson C. Smith)
- Kevin Green (West Texas A&M)
- Tatyana McClaney (Francis Marion)
- Taleah 'Noo' Washington (Wagner)

Legend

- (C) Team captain
- (S) Suspended
- (I) Ineligible
- (W) Walk-on
- Injured
- Current redshirt

Roster
Last update: August 16, 2026

== Schedule and results ==
Date time, TV	Rank^{#}	Opponent^{#}	Result	Record	Site (attendance) city, state
Regular season
November 3, 2025*; 8:30 pm, ESPN+		at Arizona State	L 53–67	0–1	Desert Financial Arena (4,026); Tempe, AZ
November 6, 2025*; 11:00 am, ESPN+		Lincoln (PA)	W 80–47	1–1	Physical Education Complex (1,928); Baltimore, MD
November 9, 2025*; 1:00 pm, B1G+		at Ohio State	L 59–88	1–2	Value City Arena (5,504); Columbus, OH
November 12, 2025*; 11:30 am, B1G+		at Penn State	L 62–90	1–3	Rec Hall (1,816); University Park, PA
November 16, 2025*; 2:00 pm, FloCollege		at Towson	L 54−65	1−4	SECU Arena (506); Towson, MD
November 23, 2025*; 2:00 pm, SECN+		at No. 15 Tennessee	L 35−88	1−5	Thompson–Boling Arena (9,947); Knoxville, TN
November 28, 2025*; 6:30 pm, FloCollege		vs. No. 9 Oklahoma; Coconut Hoops Great Egret Division semifinals	L 46–100	1–6	Alico Arena (1,286); Fort Myers, FL
November 30, 2025*; 4:00 pm, FloCollege		vs. Missouri State; Coconut Hoops Great Egret Division consolation	L 56–77	1–7	Alico Arena (868); Fort Myers, FL
December 3, 2025*; 6:00 pm, ESPN+		Marshall	L 53–75	1–8	Physical Education Complex (242); Baltimore, MD
December 6, 2025*; 2:00 pm, ESPN+		Sacred Heart	W 52–49	2–8	Physical Education Complex (267); Baltimore, MD
December 10, 2025*; 7:30 pm, ACCNX		at SMU	L 49–57	2–9	Moody Coliseum (1,175); University Park, TX
December 13, 2025*; 1:00 pm, MASN/FloCollege		at William & Mary	L 65−72	2−10	Kaplan Arena (793); Williamsburg, VA
December 19, 2025*; 7:00 pm, ESPN+		at Temple	L 39–59	2–11	Liacouras Center (1,377); Philadelphia, PA
December 21, 2025*; 12:00 pm, ESPN+		vs. Georgia; 4 Tha Culture Holiday Classic	L 55–82	2–12	Henrico Sports & Events Center; Henrico, VA
December 28, 2025*; 2:00 pm, ESPN+		at George Washington	L 49–63	2–13	Charles E. Smith Center (593); Washington, D.C.
January 3, 2026; 2:00 pm, ESPN+		at Delaware State	W 60–59	3–13 (1–0)	Memorial Hall (175); Dover, DE
January 8, 2026; 7:00 pm, ESPN+		South Carolina State	L 47–58	3–14 (1–1)	Physical Education Complex (236); Baltimore, MD
January 10, 2026; 2:00 pm, ESPN+		North Carolina Central	W 77–70	4–14 (2–1)	Physical Education Complex (392); Baltimore, MD
January 15, 2026; 6:00 pm, DSN		at Maryland Eastern Shore	L 61–68 ^{OT}	4–15 (2–2)	Hytche Athletic Center (950); Princess Anne, MD
January 18, 2026*; 12:00 pm, ESPN+		No. 2 South Carolina	L 48–90	4–16	Physical Education Complex (3,371); Baltimore, MD
January 22, 2026; 7:00 pm, ESPN+		Howard	L 51–64	4–17 (2–3)	Physical Education Complex (319); Baltimore, MD
January 24, 2026; 11:00 am, ESPN+		at Norfolk State	L 58–69	4–18 (2–4)	Echols Hall (111); Norfolk, VA
January 31, 2026; 2:00 pm, ESPN+		Morgan State	W 69–45	5–18 (3–4)	Physical Education Complex (596); Baltimore, MD
February 3, 2026*; 6:00 pm, ESPN+		Washington Adventist	W 81–49	6–18	Physical Education Complex (257); Baltimore, MD
February 7, 2026; 2:00 pm, ESPN+		Delaware State	W 83–59	7–18 (4–4)	Physical Education Complex (259); Baltimore, MD
February 12, 2026; 7:00 pm, ESPN+		at South Carolina State	W 72–39	8–18 (5–4)	SHM Memorial Center (150); Orangeburg, SC
February 14, 2026; 2:00 pm, ESPN+		at North Carolina Central	W 75–68	9–18 (6–4)	McDougald–McLendon Arena (639); Durham, NC
February 21, 2026; 2:00 pm, ESPN+		Maryland Eastern Shore	L 64–66	9–19 (6–5)	Physical Education Complex (837); Baltimore, MD
February 26, 2026; 7:00 pm, ESPN+		at Howard	L 67–75	9–20 (6–6)	Burr Gymnasium (948); Washington, D.C.
February 28, 2026; 2:00 pm, ESPN+		Norfolk State	L 34–73	9–21 (6–7)	Physical Education Complex (268); Baltimore, MD
March 5, 2026; 5:30 pm, ESPN+		at Morgan State	L 54–64	9–22 (6–8)	Hill Field House (1,138); Baltimore, MD
MEAC tournament
March 12, 2026; 12:00 pm, ESPN+	(4)	vs. (5) North Carolina Central; Quarterfinals	W 70–52	10–22	Norfolk Scope; Norfolk, VA
March 13, 2026; 12:00 pm, ESPN+	(4)	vs. (1) Howard; Semifinals	L 50–65	10–23	Norfolk Scope; Norfolk, VA
*Non-conference game. ^{#}Rankings from AP Poll. (#) Tournament seedings in parentheses. All times are in Eastern.
