= 2025–26 Morgan State Lady Bears basketball team =

American college basketball season

2025–26 Morgan State Lady Bears basketball
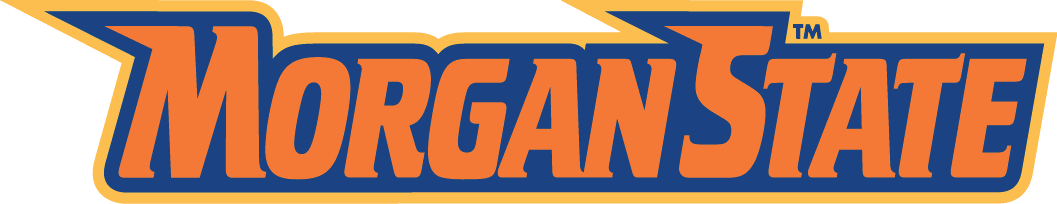
- Conference: Mid-Eastern Athletic Conference
- Record: 5–26 (4–10 MEAC)
- Head coach: Nadine Domond (1st season)
- Assistant coaches: Freddie Murray; David Pierre
- Home arena: Hill Field House

2025–26 MEAC women's basketball standings
	Conf.				Overall
Team	W		L	PCT	W		L	PCT
Howard †	13	–	1	.929	26	–	8	.765
Maryland Eastern Shore	11	–	3	.786	20	–	15	.571
Norfolk State	11	–	3	.786	18	–	15	.545
Coppin State	6	–	8	.429	10	–	23	.303
North Carolina Central	5	–	9	.357	9	–	20	.310
Morgan State	4	–	10	.286	5	–	26	.161
Delaware State	4	–	10	.286	7	–	23	.233
South Carolina State	2	–	12	.143	5	–	25	.167
† 2026 MEAC tournament winner

The 2025–26 Morgan State Lady Bears basketball team represented Morgan State University during the 2025–26 NCAA Division I women's basketball season. The Lady Bears, led by first-year head coach Nadine Domond, played their home games at Hill Field House in Baltimore, Maryland as members of the Mid-Eastern Athletic Conference (MEAC).

== Previous season ==
The Lady Bears finished the 2024–25 season 13–17, 6–8 in MEAC play, to finish in a tie for fifth place. They were defeated by Maryland Eastern Shore in the quarterfinals of the MEAC tournament.

Following the season, on March 19, 2025, head coach Ed Davis Jr. announced his retirement, ending his 13-year tenure with the program, the last nine as head coach. On April 9, the school announced the hiring of Virginia State head coach Nadine Domond as the team's new head coach.

== Preseason ==
On October 8, 2025, the Mid-Eastern Athletic Conference released their preseason poll. Morgan State was picked to finish fifth in the conference.

=== Preseason rankings ===
MEAC Preseason Poll
Place	Team	Votes
1	Howard	118 (10)
2	Norfolk State	107 (4)
3	Maryland Eastern Shore	93
4	North Carolina Central	68 (1)
5	Morgan State	62
6	Coppin State	60
7	Delaware State	41
8	South Carolina State	27 (1)
(#) first-place votes

=== Preseason All-MEAC Teams ===
Preseason All-MEAC Teams
Team	Player	Position	Year
First	Ja'la Bannerman	Guard	Senior
Third	Jael Butler	Center	Senior
Third	Gabrielle Johnson	Guard	Senior

== Roster ==
2025–26 Morgan State Lady Bears women's basketball team
Players
Coaches

Pos.	#	Name	Height	Year	Previous school	Hometown
PG	0	Mihjae Hayes	5 ft 4 in (1.63 m)	Sr	Virginia State	Philadelphia, Pennsylvania
G	1	Dakota Alston	5 ft 8 in (1.73 m)	Jr	Detroit Edison Public School Academy	Detroit, Michigan
G	2	Gabrielle Johnson	5 ft 8 in (1.73 m)	Sr	Western High School	Baltimore, Maryland
F	3	Success Prysock	6 ft 0 in (1.83 m)	Sr	Moorpark College	Palmdale, California
G	4	Ja'la Bannerman	5 ft 7 in (1.7 m)	Sr	Maryland Eastern Shore	Baltimore, Maryland
F	5	Tyra Brown	6 ft 2 in (1.88 m)	Jr	Chipola College	Fort Myers, Florida
G/F	10	Kailyn Nash	5 ft 11 in (1.8 m)	RS Sr	Alabama A&M	Muskegon, Michigan
G	11	Kimora Daly	5 ft 9 in (1.75 m)	Sr	Odessa College	Brooklyn, New York
SG	12	Selina Gutierrez	5 ft 6 in (1.68 m)	Jr	College of Southern Nevada	Las Vegas, Nevada
SG	14	Tiyanna James	5 ft 4 in (1.63 m)	GS	Virginia State	Virginia Beach, Virginia
G/F	15	Kamari Forrest	5 ft 11 in (1.8 m)	Jr	Kilgore College	Crandall, Texas
PG	20	Michaela Bogans	5 ft 6 in (1.68 m)	So	Cross Creek High School	Augusta, Georgia
C	22	Jael Butler	6 ft 2 in (1.88 m)	Sr	Valley Christian School	Gilroy, California
F	23	Maya Woodson	6 ft 2 in (1.88 m)	Jr	South Plains College	Columbia, Maryland
F	30	Sierra Headquist	6 ft 2 in (1.88 m)	Sr	Xavier (LA)	Dallas, Texas

Head coach

- Nadine Domond (Iowa)

Assistant coach(es)

- Freddie Murray (Jackson State)
- David Pierre (Grambling State)

Legend

- (C) Team captain
- (S) Suspended
- (I) Ineligible
- (W) Walk-on
- Injured
- Current redshirt

Roster
Last update: August 21, 2026

== Schedule and results ==
Date time, TV	Rank^{#}	Opponent^{#}	Result	Record	Site (attendance) city, state
Non-conference regular season
November 4, 2025*; 7:00 pm, ACCNX		at Virginia	L 36–86	0–1	John Paul Jones Arena (3,597); Charlottesville, VA
November 9, 2025*; 2:00 pm		Stetson	L 56–70	0–2	Hill Field House (505); Baltimore, MD
November 12, 2025*; 11:00 am		Washington Adventist	W 88–49	1–2	Hill Field House (1,006); Baltimore, MD
November 15, 2025*; 3:00 pm, ESPN+		at Mount St. Mary's	L 47–69	1–3	Knott Arena (1,521); Emmitsburg, MD
November 18, 2025*; 5:00 pm, ESPN+		Johns Hopkins	L 59−75	1−4	Hill Field House (528); Baltimore, MD
November 23, 2025*; 2:00 pm, ESPN+		at George Washington	L 56−82	1−5	Charles E. Smith Center (476); Washington, D.C.
November 26, 2025*; 3:00 pm, FloCollege		vs. Wake Forest; Puerto Rico Shootout	L 35–93	1–6	Coliseo Guillermo Angulo (250); San Juan, PR
November 27, 2025*; 5:30 pm, FloCollege		vs. Rice; Puerto Rico Shootout	L 44–75	1–7	Coliseo Guillermo Angulo (250); San Juan, PR
November 28, 2025*; 5:30 pm, FloCollege		vs. No. 16 Kentucky; Puerto Rico Shootout	L 39–101	1–8	Coliseo Guillermo Angulo (250); San Juan, PR
December 2, 2025*; 7:00 pm, ESPN+		at Toledo	L 66–79	1–9	Savage Arena (3,645); Toledo, OH
December 6, 2025*; 2:00 pm, ESPN+		UMBC; Charm City Hoops Classic	L 48–66	1–10	Hill Field House (482); Baltimore, MD
December 14, 2025*; 2:00 pm, ESPN+		at UCF	L 56−78	1−11	Addition Financial Arena (1,019); Orlando, FL
December 16, 2025*; 12:00 pm, SECN+		at No. 5 LSU	L 33–91	1–12	Pete Maravich Assembly Center (8,743); Baton Rouge, LA
December 19, 2025*; 11:00 am, ESPN+		at Davidson	L 34–78	1–13	John M. Belk Arena (3,083); Davidson, NC
December 21, 2025*; 1:00 pm, ESPN+		at Loyola (MD)	L 58–65	1–14	Reitz Arena (234); Baltimore, MD
December 30, 2025*; 3:00 pm, Monumental/FloCollege		at Towson; Charm City Hoops Classic	L 61–63	1–15	SECU Arena (583); Towson, MD
MEAC regular season
January 3, 2026; 2:00 pm, DSN		at Maryland Eastern Shore	L 61–68	1–16 (0–1)	Hytche Athletic Center (702); Princess Anne, MD
January 8, 2026; 6:00 pm		North Carolina Central	W 64–63	2–16 (1–1)	Hill Field House (407); Baltimore, MD
January 10, 2026; 2:00 pm, ESPN+		South Carolina State	L 59–62	2–17 (1–2)	Hill Field House (302); Baltimore, MD
January 17, 2026; 2:00 pm, ESPN+		at Delaware State	W 61–59	3–17 (2–2)	Memorial Hall (239); Dover, DE
January 22, 2026; 6:00 pm, ESPN+		at Norfolk State	L 52–78	3–18 (2–3)	Echols Hall (752); Norfolk, VA
January 24, 2026; 11:00 am, ESPN+		at Howard	L 57–71	3–19 (2–4)	Burr Gymnasium; Washington, D.C.
January 31, 2026; 2:00 pm, ESPN+		at Coppin State	L 45–69	3–20 (2–5)	Physical Education Complex (596); Baltimore, MD
February 7, 2026; 2:00 pm, ESPN+		Maryland Eastern Shore	L 53–66	3–21 (2–6)	Hill Field House (748); Baltimore, MD
February 12, 2026; 6:30 pm, ESPN+		at North Carolina Central	L 63–66 ^{OT}	3–22 (2–7)	McDougald–McLendon Arena (942); Durham, NC
February 16, 2026; 2:00 pm, ESPN+		at South Carolina State	W 73–47	4–22 (3–7)	SHM Memorial Center (100); Orangeburg, SC
February 21, 2026; 2:00 pm, ESPN+		Delaware State	L 59–74	4–23 (3–8)	Hill Field House (753); Baltimore, MD
February 26, 2026; 6:00 pm		Norfolk State	L 60–69	4–24 (3–9)	Hill Field House (426); Baltimore, MD
February 28, 2026; 2:00 pm, ESPN+		Howard	L 65–84	4–25 (3–10)	Hill Field House (824); Baltimore, MD
March 5, 2026; 5:30 pm, ESPN+		Coppin State	W 64–54	5–25 (4–10)	Hill Field House (1,138); Baltimore, MD
MEAC tournament
March 12, 2026; 2:00 pm, ESPN+	(6)	vs. (3) Norfolk State; Quarterfinals	L 43–69	5–26	Norfolk Scope; Norfolk, VA
*Non-conference game. ^{#}Rankings from AP Poll. (#) Tournament seedings in parentheses. All times are in Eastern.
