= 2025–26 Maryland Eastern Shore Hawks women's basketball team =

American college basketball season

2025–26 Maryland Eastern Shore Hawks women's basketball
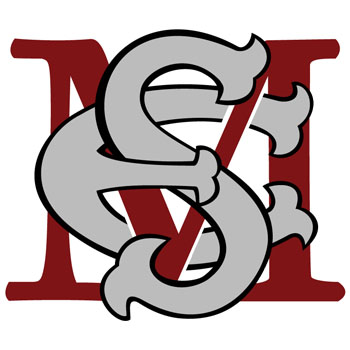

WNIT, Second Round
- Conference: Mid-Eastern Athletic Conference
- Record: 20–15 (11–3 MEAC)
- Head coach: Malikah Willis (2nd season)
- Associate head coach: Adria Crawford
- Assistant coach: Sarah Miles
- Home arena: Hytche Athletic Center

2025–26 MEAC women's basketball standings
	Conf.				Overall
Team	W		L	PCT	W		L	PCT
Howard †	13	–	1	.929	26	–	8	.765
Maryland Eastern Shore	11	–	3	.786	20	–	15	.571
Norfolk State	11	–	3	.786	18	–	15	.545
Coppin State	6	–	8	.429	10	–	23	.303
North Carolina Central	5	–	9	.357	9	–	20	.310
Morgan State	4	–	10	.286	5	–	26	.161
Delaware State	4	–	10	.286	7	–	23	.233
South Carolina State	2	–	12	.143	5	–	25	.167
† 2026 MEAC tournament winner

The 2025–26 Maryland Eastern Shore Hawks women's basketball team represented the University of Maryland Eastern Shore during the 2025–26 NCAA Division I women's basketball season. The Hawks, led by second-year head coach Malikah Willis, played their home games at the Hytche Athletic Center in Princess Anne, Maryland as members of the Mid-Eastern Athletic Conference (MEAC).

== Previous season ==
The Hawks finished the 2024–25 season 14–17, 8–6 in MEAC play, to finish in a tie for third place. They defeated Morgan State, before falling to Howard in the semifinals of the MEAC tournament.

== Preseason ==
On October 8, 2025, the Mid-Eastern Athletic Conference released their preseason poll. Maryland Eastern Shore was picked to finish third in the conference.

=== Preseason rankings ===
MEAC Preseason Poll
Place	Team	Votes
1	Howard	118 (10)
2	Norfolk State	107 (4)
3	Maryland Eastern Shore	93
4	North Carolina Central	68 (1)
5	Morgan State	62
6	Coppin State	60
7	Delaware State	41
8	South Carolina State	27 (1)
(#) first-place votes

=== Preseason All-MEAC Teams ===
Preseason All-MEAC Teams
Team	Player	Position	Year
Second	Brianna Barnes	Forward	Senior
Second	Ashanti Lynch	Guard	Senior

== Roster ==
2025–26 Maryland Eastern Shore Hawks women's basketball team
Players
Coaches

Pos.	#	Name	Height	Year	Previous school	Hometown
G	0	Jaida Cameron	5 ft 9 in (1.75 m)	So	Cape Fear Community College	Florence, South Carolina
G	5	Jailynn Clayton	5 ft 9 in (1.75 m)	Fr	Mt. Zion Prep Academy	Fresno, California
G	8	Dayshawna Carter	5 ft 7 in (1.7 m)	GS	Monmouth	Harlem, New York
G	10	Zaniya Nelson	5 ft 11 in (1.8 m)	GS	Eastern Michigan	Oklahoma City, Oklahoma
G	11	Desi Taylor	5 ft 7 in (1.7 m)	Fr	St. Francis School	Atlanta, Georgia
F	12	Brianna Barnes	5 ft 11 in (1.8 m)	Sr	Lehman College	Bronx, New York
G	15	Kalise Hill	5 ft 6 in (1.68 m)	So	Morehead State	Powder Springs, Georgia
G	24	Enola Papin	5 ft 9 in (1.75 m)	Jr	South Georgia Technical College	Saint-Étienne, France
G	25	Ashanti Lynch	5 ft 9 in (1.75 m)	Sr	North Lenoir High School	Hookerton, North Carolina
F	31	Candela Sabater Sánchez	6 ft 0 in (1.83 m)	So	Santa María Del Carmen	Elda, Spain
F	32	Kaliya Perry	6 ft 0 in (1.83 m)	Fr	Hampton High School	Hampton, Virginia
F	33	Lainey Allen	6 ft 2 in (1.88 m)	Sr	Plymouth-Whitemarsh High School	Plymouth Meeting, Pennsylvania
F	35	Dakieran Turner	6 ft 1 in (1.85 m)	Sr	Saint Frances Academy	Annapolis, Maryland

Head coach

- Malikah Willis (Iowa)

Assistant coach(es)

- Adria Crawford (Georgetown)
- Sarah Miles (West Virginia)

Legend

- (C) Team captain
- (S) Suspended
- (I) Ineligible
- (W) Walk-on
- Injured
- Current redshirt

Roster
Last update: August 11, 2026

== Schedule and results ==
Date time, TV	Rank^{#}	Opponent^{#}	Result	Record	Site (attendance) city, state
Non-conference regular season
November 5, 2025*; 6:00 pm, ESPN+		at VCU	L 48–62	0–1	Siegel Center (460); Richmond, VA
November 8, 2025*; 2:00 pm		Cheyney	W 91–37	1–1	Hytche Athletic Center (4,000); Princess Anne, MD
November 11, 2025*; 6:00 pm, DSN		Monmouth	W 71–66	2–1	Hytche Athletic Center (215); Princess Anne, MD
November 14, 2025*; 7:30 pm, B1G+		at Northwestern	L 54–69	2–2	Welsh–Ryan Arena (1,021); Evanston, IL
November 16, 2025*; 2:00 pm, ESPN+		at Loyola Chicago	W 70−67	3−2	Joseph J. Gentile Arena (576); Chicago, IL
November 19, 2025*; 12:00 pm, DSN		UMBC	W 68−54	4−2	Hytche Athletic Center (262); Princess Anne, MD
November 22, 2025*; 3:30 pm		vs. San Diego State; Battle 4 Atlantis	L 45–58	4–3	Imperial Arena (201); Paradise Island, Bahamas
November 23, 2025*; 12:00 pm		vs. Princeton; Battle 4 Atlantis	L 62–81	4–4	Imperial Arena (226); Paradise Island, Bahamas
November 26, 2025*; 1:00 pm, ESPN+		at Mount St. Mary's	W 67–59	5–4	Knott Arena (446); Emmitsburg, MD
November 30, 2025*; 2:00 pm, ACCNX		at Virginia	L 59–92	5–5	John Paul Jones Arena (3,742); Charlottesville, VA
December 5, 2025*; 7:00 pm, ESPN+		at Wichita State	W 56–52	6–5	Charles Koch Arena (761); Wichita, KS
December 7, 2025*; 2:00 pm, SECN+		at No. 9 Oklahoma	L 37−90	6−6	Lloyd Noble Center (3,252); Norman, OK
December 14, 2025*; 2:00 pm, DSN		La Salle	L 58–63	6–7	Hytche Athletic Center (200); Princess Anne, MD
December 17, 2025*; 6:00 pm, DSN		Towson	L 86–87 ^{OT}	6–8	Hytche Athletic Center (225); Princess Anne, MD
December 20, 2025*; 1:00 pm, DSN		Bloomfield	W 90–75	7–8	Hytche Athletic Center (100); Princess Anne, MD
December 29, 2025*; 4:00 pm, NECFR		vs. Penn; FDU Christmas Classic	L 57–78	7–9	Bogota Savings Bank Center (139); Hackensack, NJ
December 30, 2025*; 4:00 pm, NECFR		at Fairleigh Dickinson; FDU Christmas Classic	L 57–85	7–10	Bogota Savings Bank Center (139); Hackensack, NJ
MEAC regular season
January 3, 2026; 2:00 pm, DSN		Morgan State	W 68–61	8–10 (1–0)	Hytche Athletic Center (702); Princess Anne, MD
January 8, 2026; 6:00 pm, ESPN+		at Norfolk State	W 63–60	9–10 (2–0)	Echols Hall (564); Norfolk, VA
January 10, 2026; 2:00 pm, DSN		Howard	W 62–56	10–10 (3–0)	Hytche Athletic Center (1,000); Princess Anne, MD
January 15, 2026; 6:00 pm, DSN		Coppin State	W 68–61 ^{OT}	11–10 (4–0)	Hytche Athletic Center (950); Princess Anne, MD
January 22, 2026; 6:30 pm, ESPN+		at North Carolina Central	Postponed		McDougald–McLendon Arena; Durham, NC
January 24, 2026; 2:00 pm, ESPN+		at South Carolina State	Postponed		SHM Memorial Center; Orangeburg, SC
January 31, 2025; 2:00 pm, ESPN+		at Delaware State	W 58–47	12–10 (5–0)	Memorial Hall; Dover, DE
February 2, 2026; 2:00 pm, ESPN+		at North Carolina Central; Rescheduled from January 22	L 62–69	12–11 (5–1)	McDougald–McLendon Arena (231); Durham, NC
February 4, 2026; 5:30 pm, ESPN+		at South Carolina State; Rescheduled from January 24	W 73–53	13–11 (6–1)	SHM Memorial Center (250); Orangeburg, SC
February 7, 2026; 2:00 pm, ESPN+		at Morgan State	W 66–53	14–11 (7–1)	Hill Field House (748); Baltimore, MD
February 12, 2026; 6:00 pm, DSN		Norfolk State	L 51–57	14–12 (7–2)	Hytche Athletic Center (700); Princess Anne, MD
February 14, 2026; 2:00 pm, ESPN+		at Howard	L 45–66	14–13 (7–3)	Burr Gymnasium (738); Washington, D.C.
February 21, 2026; 2:00 pm, ESPN+		at Coppin State	W 66–64	15–13 (8–3)	Physical Education Complex (837); Baltimore, MD
February 26, 2026; 6:00 pm, DSN		North Carolina Central	W 58–55	16–13 (9–3)	Hytche Athletic Center (126); Princess Anne, MD
February 28, 2026; 2:00 pm, DSN		South Carolina State	W 74–33	17–13 (10–3)	Hytche Athletic Center (220); Princess Anne, MD
March 5, 2026; 5:30 pm, DSN		Delaware State	W 56–48	18–13 (11–3)	Hytche Athletic Center (1,035); Princess Anne, MD
MEAC tournament
March 11, 2026; 2:00 pm, ESPN+	(2)	vs. (7) Delaware State; Quarterfinals	W 55–48	19–13	Norfolk Scope; Norfolk, VA
March 13, 2026; 2:00 pm, ESPN+	(2)	vs. (3) Norfolk State; Semifinals	L 51–60	19–14	Norfolk Scope; Norfolk, VA
WNIT
March 19, 2026*; 6:00 pm, ESPN+		at Wake Forest; First Round	W 59–48	20–14	LJVM Coliseum (545); Winston-Salem, NC
March 24, 2026*; 6:30 pm, ESPN+		at Youngstown State; Second Round	L 42–61	20–15	Beeghly Center (1,775); Youngstown, OH
*Non-conference game. ^{#}Rankings from AP Poll. (#) Tournament seedings in parentheses. All times are in Eastern.
