= 2025–26 Howard Bison women's basketball team =

American college basketball season

2025–26 Howard Bison women's basketball

MEAC regular season and Tournament champions

NCAA tournament, First Round
- Conference: Mid-Eastern Athletic Conference
- Record: 26–8 (13–1 MEAC)
- Head coach: Ty Grace (11th season)
- Associate head coach: Brian Davis
- Assistant coaches: Dr. Montel Jones; Casey Monroe-Gaskin
- Home arena: Burr Gymnasium

2025–26 MEAC women's basketball standings
	Conf.				Overall
Team	W		L	PCT	W		L	PCT
Howard †	13	–	1	.929	26	–	7	.788
Maryland Eastern Shore	11	–	3	.786	20	–	14	.588
Norfolk State	11	–	3	.786	18	–	14	.563
Coppin State	6	–	8	.429	10	–	23	.303
North Carolina Central	5	–	9	.357	9	–	20	.310
Morgan State	4	–	10	.286	5	–	26	.161
Delaware State	4	–	10	.286	7	–	23	.233
South Carolina State	2	–	12	.143	5	–	25	.167
† 2026 MEAC tournament winner As of March 19, 2026

The 2025–26 Howard Bison women's basketball team represented Howard University during the 2025–26 NCAA Division I women's basketball season. The Bison, who are led by 11th-year head coach Ty Grace, played their home games at Burr Gymnasium in Washington D.C. as members of the Mid-Eastern Athletic Conference (MEAC).

== Previous season ==
The Bison finished the 2024-25 season 22-12, 12-2 in MEAC play, to finish in second place. They defeated Delaware State in the Quarterfinals, Maryland Eastern Shore in the Semifinals, before falling to top-seeded Norfolk State in the MEAC tournament championship game. They would be selected to the 2025 WNIT, where they would defeat Siena in the 1st Round, but would lose to Charleston in the 2nd Round.

== Preseason ==
On October 8, 2025, the MEAC released their preseason coaches poll. Howard was picked to finish first in the MEAC.

=== Preseason rankings ===
MEAC preseason poll
Predicted finish	Team	Votes (1st place)
1	Howard	118 (10)
2	Norfolk State	107
3	Maryland Eastern Shore	93
4	North Carolina Central	68 (1)
5	Morgan State	62
6	Coppin State	60
7	Delaware State	41
8	South Carolina State	27 (1)

=== Preseason All-MEAC Teams ===
Preseason All-MEAC Teams
Team	Player	Position	Year
First	Nile Miller	Forward	Senior
First	Zennia Thomas	Forward	Senior

== Roster ==
2025–26 Howard Bison women's basketball team
Players
Coaches

Pos.	#	Name	Height	Year	Previous school	Hometown
G	2	Dylan Watson	6 ft 1 in (1.85 m)	Fr	River Hill High School	Brooklyn, New York
G	4	Ariella Henigan	5 ft 6 in (1.68 m)	Fr	Kenwood Academy	Chicago, Illinois
G	5	Destiny Bynum-Johnson	5 ft 10 in (1.78 m)	Jr	Union College	Newark, New Jersey
G	6	Emma Nuquay	5 ft 9 in (1.75 m)	Fr	Elizabeth Seton High School	Waldorf, Maryland
F	11	Sa'lah Hemingway	6 ft 0 in (1.83 m)	Jr	Etiwanda High School	San Bernardino, California
F	12	Dally Moreno	6 ft 0 in (1.83 m)	RS So	Stony Brook	Bronx, New York
F	14	Jada Kendrick	5 ft 11 in (1.8 m)	Fr	Thomson High School	Thomson, Georgia
G	15	April Edwards	5 ft 7 in (1.7 m)	RS So	Trinity Valley Community College	Little Rock, Arkansas
F	21	Rayne Durant	6 ft 1 in (1.85 m)	Jr	UMass Lowell	New Haven, Connecticut
F	22	Penelope Swarn	6 ft 4 in (1.93 m)	Fr	Hightstown High School	Hightstown, New Jersey
G	23	Zoe Stewart	5 ft 10 in (1.78 m)	RS Jr	Missouri State	Terre Haute, Indiana
F	24	Zennia Thomas	6 ft 2 in (1.88 m)	Sr	Kentucky	Cleveland, Ohio
F	25	Nile Miller	6 ft 1 in (1.85 m)	Sr	Woodbury High School	Haddonfield, New Jersey
F	34	Jenesis Perrin	6 ft 5 in (1.96 m)	Sr	Lawrence Academy	Norwich, Connecticut

Head coach

- Ty Grace (New Haven)

Assistant coach(es)

- Brian Davis (Tennessee Tech)
- Dr. Montel Jones (Howard)
- Casey Monroe-Gaskin (Maryland Eastern Shore)

Legend

- (C) Team captain
- (S) Suspended
- (I) Ineligible
- (W) Walk-on
- Injured
- Current redshirt

Roster
Last update: March 18, 2026

== Schedule and results ==
Date time, TV	Rank^{#}	Opponent^{#}	Result	Record	Site (attendance) city, state
Exhibition
October 27, 2025*; 6:00 pm		District of Columbia	W 72–40		Burr Gymnasium; Washington, D.C.
Non-conference regular season
November 4, 2025*; 7:00 pm, ESPN+		at Providence	W 68–56	1–0	Alumni Hall (512); Providence, RI
November 8, 2025*; 2:00 pm, ESPN+		Florida A&M	W 89–53	2–0	Burr Gymnasium (1,582); Washington, D.C.
November 11, 2025*; 6:00 pm, ESPN+		at George Washington	W 62–60	3–0	Charles E. Smith Center (511); Washington, D.C.
November 15, 2025*; 5:00 pm, FloSports		at Elon	W 56–46	4–0	Schar Center (959); Elon, NC
November 17, 2025*; 6:00 pm, ESPN+		at VCU	L 66–69	4–1	Siegel Center (612); Richmond, VA
November 20, 2025*; 7:00 pm, FloSports		at Monmouth	W 57–44	5–1	OceanFirst Bank Center (529); West Long Branch, NJ
November 23, 2025*; 2:00 pm, ESPN+		William & Mary	W 64–53	6–1	Burr Gymnasium (739); Washington, D.C.
November 26, 2025*; 12:00 pm, B1G+		at Purdue	L 62–92	6–2	Mackey Arena (6,848); West Lafayette, IN
November 30, 2025*; 2:00 pm, ESPN+		at Syracuse	L 62–78	6–3	JMA Wireless Dome (2,445); Syracuse, NY
December 5, 2025*; 12:00 pm, ESPN+		Fairfield	W 72–69	7–3	Burr Gymnasium (1,076); Washington, D.C.
December 7, 2025*; 2:00 pm, ESPN+		at Old Dominion	L 59–63	7–4	Chartway Arena (2,074); Norfolk, VA
December 10, 2025*; 7:00 pm, ACCNX		at Virginia	L 50–76	7–5	John Paul Jones Arena (3,611); Charlottesville, VA
December 13, 2025*; 12:00 pm, ESPN+		vs. Hampton; Battle of the Real HU	W 64–60	8–5	CareFirst Arena (2,471); Washington, D.C.
December 16, 2025*; 6:30 pm, ESPN+		at Cincinnati	W 66–64	9–5	Fifth Third Arena (1,450); Cincinnati, OH
December 20, 2025*; 2:00 pm, ESPN+		St. Bonaventure	W 76–64	10–5	Burr Gymnasium (538); Washington, D.C.
December 29, 2025*; 12:00 pm, ESPN+		at Army	L 56–64	10–6	Christl Arena (669); West Point, NY
MEAC regular season
January 3, 2026; 2:00 pm, ESPN+		at South Carolina State	W 68–64	11–6 (1–0)	SHM Memorial Center (275); Orangeburg, SC
January 8, 2026; 6:00 pm, ESPN+		Delaware State	W 73–63	12–6 (2–0)	Burr Gymnasium (582); Washington, D.C.
January 10, 2026; 2:00 pm		at Maryland Eastern Shore	L 56–62	12–7 (2–1)	Hytche Athletic Center (1,000); Princess Anne, MD
January 17, 2026; 2:00 pm, ESPN+		at North Carolina Central	W 69–61	13–7 (3–1)	McDougald–McLendon Arena (983); Durham, NC
January 22, 2026; 7:00 pm, ESPN+		at Coppin State	W 64–51	14–7 (4–1)	Physical Education Complex (319); Baltimore, MD
January 24, 2026; 11:00 am, ESPN+		Morgan State	W 71–57	15–7 (5–1)	Burr Gymnasium (1,244); Washington, D.C.
January 31, 2026; 1:00 pm, ESPN+		Norfolk State	W 68–59	16–7 (6–1)	Burr Gymnasium (1,167); Washington, D.C.
February 7, 2026; 2:00 pm, ESPN+		South Carolina State	W 85–66	17–7 (7–1)	Burr Gymnasium (1,042); Washington, D.C.
February 12, 2026; 6:00 pm, ESPN+		at Delaware State	W 68–51	18–7 (8–1)	Memorial Hall (138); Dover, DE
February 14, 2026; 2:00 pm, ESPN+		Maryland Eastern Shore	W 66–45	19–7 (9–1)	Burr Gymnasium (738); Washington, D.C.
February 21, 2026; 2:30 pm, ESPN+		North Carolina Central	W 66–58	20–7 (10–1)	Burr Gymnasium (1,121); Washington, D.C.
February 26, 2026; 6:00 pm, ESPN+		Coppin State	W 75–67	21–7 (11–1)	Burr Gymnasium (948); Washington, D.C.
February 28, 2026; 2:00 pm, ESPN+		at Morgan State	W 84–65	22–7 (12–1)	Hill Field House (824); Baltimore, MD
March 5, 2026; 5:30 pm, ESPN+		at Norfolk State	W 74–59	23–7 (13–1)	Echols Hall (3,419); Norfolk, VA
MEAC tournament
March 11, 2026*; 12:00 pm, ESPN+	(1)	vs. (8) South Carolina State; Quarterfinals	W 75–43	24–7	Norfolk Scope; Norfolk, Virginia
March 13, 2026*; 12:00 pm, ESPN+	(1)	vs. (4) Coppin State; Semifinals	W 65–50	25–7	Norfolk Scope; Norfolk, Virginia
March 14, 2026*; 4:00 pm, ESPNews	(1)	vs. (3) Norfolk State; Championship	W 53–46	26–7	Norfolk Scope; Norfolk, Virginia
NCAA Tournament
March 21, 2026*; 11:30 am, ESPN2	(14 FW1)	at (3 FW1) No. 12 Ohio State; First Round	L 54–75	26–8	Value City Arena; Columbus, OH
*Non-conference game. ^{#}Rankings from AP Poll. (#) Tournament seedings in parentheses. Fort Worth 1=FW1. All times are in Eastern.
