= 2025–26 Vanderbilt Commodores women's basketball team =

Women's basketball season

2025–26 Vanderbilt Commodores women's basketball

Paradise Jam Island Division champions

NCAA tournament, Sweet Sixteen
- Conference: Southeastern Conference

Ranking
- Coaches: No. 6
- AP: No. 6
- Record: 29–5 (13–3 SEC)
- Head coach: Shea Ralph (5th season)
- Associate head coach: Tom Garrick
- Assistant coaches: Ashley Earley; Kevin DeMille; Kaili McLaren
- Home arena: Memorial Gymnasium

2025–26 SEC women's basketball standings
	Conf.				Overall
Team	W		L	PCT	W		L	PCT
No. 2 South Carolina	15	–	1	.938	36	–	4	.900
No. 10 Vanderbilt	13	–	3	.813	29	–	5	.853
No. 4 Texas †	13	–	3	.813	35	–	4	.897
No. 8 LSU	12	–	4	.750	29	–	6	.829
No. 12 Oklahoma	11	–	5	.688	26	–	8	.765
Tennessee	8	–	8	.500	16	–	14	.533
No. 21 Ole Miss	8	–	8	.500	24	–	12	.667
Georgia	8	–	8	.500	22	–	10	.688
No. 14 Kentucky	8	–	8	.500	25	–	11	.694
Texas A&M	7	–	9	.438	14	–	13	.519
No. 24 Alabama	7	–	9	.438	24	–	11	.686
Florida	5	–	11	.313	18	–	15	.545
Mississippi State	5	–	11	.313	18	–	13	.581
Missouri	4	–	12	.250	17	–	17	.500
Auburn	3	–	13	.188	15	–	17	.469
Arkansas	1	–	15	.063	12	–	20	.375
† 2026 SEC tournament winner Rankings from AP poll

The 2025–26 Vanderbilt Commodores women's basketball team represented Vanderbilt University during the 2025–26 NCAA Division I women's basketball season. The Commodores, led by fifth-year head coach Shea Ralph, played their home games at Memorial Gymnasium and competed as members of the Southeastern Conference (SEC).

== Previous season ==
The Commdores finished the 2024–25 season 22–11, 8–8 in SEC play to finish in a tie for eighth place. As the No. 8 seed in the SEC tournament, they defeated Tennessee in the second round before losing to South Carolina in the quarterfinals. They received an at-large bid to the NCAA tournament as the No. 7 seed Birmingham 2 region. They lost in the first round to Oregon.

== Offseason ==
=== Departures ===
Vanderbilt departures
Name	Number	Pos.	Height	Year	Hometown	Reason for departure
Leilani Kapinus	5	G	5'10"	GS senior	Madison, WI	Graduated
Jane Nwaba	10	F	5'10"	GS senior	Carson, CA	Graduated
Jordyn Oliver	11	G	5'10"	GS senior	Prosper, TX	Graduated
Khamil Pierre	12	F	6'2"	Sophomore	Phoenix, AZ	Transferred to NC State
Iyana Moore	23	G	5'8"	Senior	Milwaukee, WI	Transferred to Notre Dame

=== Incoming transfers ===
Vanderbilt incoming transfers
Name	Number	Pos.	Height	Year	Hometown	Previous school
Ndjakalenga Mwenentanda	15	G	6'2"	Graduate student	Sioux Falls, SD	Texas
Aalyah Del Rosario	32	C	6'6"	Junior	Bronx, NY	LSU

=== 2025 recruiting class ===
There was no recruiting class of 2025.

== Roster ==
2025–26 Vanderbilt Commodores women's basketball team
Players
Coaches

Pos.	#	Name	Height	Year	Previous school	Hometown
G	1	Mikayla Blakes	5 ft 8 in (1.73 m)	So	Rutgers Prep	Somerset, NJ
G	2	Jada Brown	5 ft 8 in (1.73 m)	Sr	Bentonville HS	Bentonville, AR
G	3	Aubrey Galvan	5 ft 6 in (1.68 m)	Fr	Wilmette Loyola Academy	Deerfield, IL
G	4	Madison Greene	5 ft 6 in (1.68 m)	Jr	Pickerington Central HS	Columbus, OH
G	8	Ava Black	5 ft 11 in (1.8 m)	Fr	Tabor Academy (Mass.)	Auburn, NH
F	11	Monique Williams	6 ft 1 in (1.85 m)	Fr	Willetton Sr. HS	Perth, Australia
G/F	13	Justine Pissott	6 ft 4 in (1.93 m)	Sr	Red Bank Catholic HS; Tennessee	Toms River, NJ
F	14	Aiyana Mitchell	6 ft 4 in (1.93 m)	Jr	Fountain-Fort Carson HS	Colorado Springs, CO
G	15	Ndjakalenga Mwenentanda	6 ft 2 in (1.88 m)	Sr	Washington HS; Texas	Sioux Falls, SD
G	24	Aga Makurat	6 ft 3 in (1.91 m)	So	Sopocka Akademia Tenisowa	Sierakowice, Poland
F	30	Trinity Wilson	6 ft 3 in (1.91 m)	Fr	Lakeville North HS	Lakeville, MN
C	32	Aalyah Del Rosario	6 ft 6 in (1.98 m)	Jr	The Webb School; LSU	The Bronx, NY
F	35	Sacha Washington	6 ft 2 in (1.88 m)	Sr	Collins Hill HS	Lawrenceville, GA

Head coach

- Shea Ralph (Connecticut)

Assistant coach(es)

- Tom Garrick (Rhode Island)
- Ashley Earley (Vanderbilt)
- Kevin DeMille (Connecticut)
- Kaili McLaren (Connecticut)

Legend

- (C) Team captain
- (S) Suspended
- (I) Ineligible
- (W) Walk-on
- Injured
- Current redshirt

Roster

== Schedule and results ==
Date time, TV	Rank^{#}	Opponent^{#}	Result	Record	High points	High rebounds	High assists	Site (attendance) city, state
Exhibition
October 27, 2025*; 5:30 p.m., ESPNU	No. 19	at Memphis; 2025 Hoops for St. Jude Tip Off Classic	W 104–68		40 – Blakes	11 – Washington	10 – Pissott	FedExForum; Memphis, TN
Regular season
November 3, 2025*; 1:30 p.m., ESPNU	No. 19	vs. California; Oui Play Paris	W 74–65	1–0	27 – Blakes	10 – Mitchell	7 – Galvan	Adidas Arena (5,712); Paris, France
November 10, 2025*; 6:00 p.m., SECN	No. 19	Furman	W 96–48	2–0	16 – Mwenentanda	7 – Galvan	8 – Galvan	Memorial Gymnasium (2,352); Nashville, TN
November 12, 2025*; 6:00 p.m., ESPN+	No. 19	at Austin Peay	W 75–65	3–0	26 – Blakes	10 – Washington	4 – Pissott	F&M Bank Arena (1,178); Clarksville, TN
November 19, 2025*; 6:30 p.m., ESPN+	No. 17	at Western Kentucky	W 87–49	4–0	28 – Blakes	9 – Blakes	4 – Tied	E. A. Diddle Arena (1,536); Bowling Green, KY
November 21, 2025*; 11:00 a.m., SECN+/ESPN+	No. 17	Alabama State	W 92–38	5–0	21 – Makurat	7 – Washington	8 – Galvan	Memorial Gymnasium (3,733); Nashville, TN
November 23, 2025*; 2:00 p.m., SECN+/ESPN+	No. 17	Tennessee State	W 99–43	6–0	24 – Blakes	10 – Washington	15 – Galvan	Memorial Gymnasium (2,508); Nashville, TN
November 27, 2025*; 7:00 p.m., ESPN+	No. 17	vs. Oregon State; Paradise Jam Island Division semifinals	W 88–66	7–0	35 – Blakes	6 – Tied	4 – Tied	Sports and Fitness Center (824); St. Thomas, USVI
November 29, 2025*; 11:00 a.m., ESPN+	No. 17	vs. BYU; Paradise Jam Island Division Final	W 84–71	8–0	27 – Blakes	12 – Washington	6 – Tied	Sports and Fitness Center; St. Thomas, USVI
December 3, 2025*; 4:00 p.m., SECN	No. 15	Virginia; ACC–SEC Challenge	W 81–68	9–0	28 – Blakes	7 – Tied	8 – Galvan	Memorial Gymnasium (2,661); Nashville, TN
December 15, 2025*; 6:30 p.m., SECN+/ESPN+	No. 13	South Florida	W 87–58	10–0	19 – Blakes	6 – Tied	8 – Galvan	Memorial Gymnasium (2,188); Nashville, TN
December 18, 2025*; 6:30 p.m., SECN+/ESPN+	No. 13	Albany	W 64–35	11–0	17 – Blakes	6 – Tied	4 – Tied	Memorial Gymnasium (2,221); Nashville, TN
December 20, 2025*; 12:00 p.m., SECN+/ESPN+	No. 13	Texas Southern	W 96–46	12–0	25 – Pissott	10 – Mitchell	11 – Galvan	Memorial Gymnasium (2,511); Nashville, TN
December 28, 2025*; 2:00 p.m., SECN+/ESPN+	No. 12	Stonehill	W 109–50	13–0	21 – Blakes	5 – Tied	7 – Tied	Memorial Gymnasium (2,487); Nashville, TN
January 1, 2026; 1:00 p.m., SECN+/ESPN+	No. 12	at Arkansas	W 88–71	14–0 (1–0)	35 – Blakes	13 – Washington	8 – Blakes	Bud Walton Arena (3,633); Fayetteville, AR
January 4, 2026; 4:00 p.m., ESPN	No. 12	No. 5 LSU	W 65–61	15–0 (2–0)	32 – Blakes	7 – Washington	4 – Blakes	Memorial Gymnasium (6,576); Nashville, TN
January 8, 2026; 6:30 p.m., SECN+/ESPN+	No. 7	Missouri	W 99–68	16–0 (3–0)	20 – Blakes	16 – Washington	6 – Blakes	Memorial Gymnasium (3,141); Nashville, TN
January 11, 2026; 2:00 p.m., SECN+/ESPN+	No. 7	at Texas A&M	W 91–51	17–0 (4–0)	25 – Blakes	8 – Washington	7 – Galvan	Reed Arena (3,426); College Station, TX
January 15, 2026; 5:30 p.m., SECN	No. 5	at Mississippi State	W 89−84	18−0 (5−0)	38 – Blakes	8 – Mitchell	7 – Blakes	Humphrey Coliseum (4,082); Starkville, MS
January 19, 2026*; 1:30 p.m., FOX	No. 5	vs. No. 7 Michigan; Coretta Scott King Classic	W 72–69	19–0	20 – Galvan	8 – Pissott	5 – Pissott	Prudential Center (6,742); Newark, NJ
January 22, 2026; 6:30 p.m., SECN+/ESPN+	No. 5	Auburn	W 81–53	20–0 (6–0)	20 – Blakes	12 – Washington	10 – Galvan	Memorial Gymnasium (3,241); Nashville, TN
January 25, 2026; 2:00 p.m., ESPN	No. 5	at No. 2 South Carolina	L 74–103	20–1 (6–1)	23 – Blakes	7 – Blakes	5 – Tied	Colonial Life Arena (17,002); Columbia, SC
January 30, 2026; 2:00 p.m., SECN+/ESPN+	No. 5	vs. No. 17 Ole Miss	L 75–83	20–2 (6–2)	29 – Blakes	7 – Pissott	4 – Tied	Legacy Arena (Note: The game against Ole Miss was moved to Birmingham, Alabama, because of ongoing winter storm impacts in Oxford, Mississippi.) (2,158); Birmingham, AL
February 1, 2026; 3:00 p.m., SECN	No. 5	Florida; Play4Kay	W 82–66	21–2 (7–2)	30 – Blakes	6 – Washington	8 – Blakes	Memorial Gymnasium (9,268); Nashville, TN
February 5, 2026; 6:00 p.m., SECN+/ESPN+	No. 7	at No. 16 Kentucky	W 84–83	22–2 (8–2)	37 – Blakes	5 – Pissott	7 – Galvan	Memorial Coliseum (5,187); Lexington, KY
February 9, 2026; 8:00 p.m., ESPN2	No. 5	No. 10 Oklahoma	W 102–86	23–2 (9–2)	34 – Blakes	9 – Mwenentanda	6 – Blakes	Memorial Gymnasium (3,316); Nashville, TN
February 12, 2026; 6:30 p.m., SECN+/ESPN+	No. 5	No. 4 Texas	W 86–70	24–2 (10–2)	34 – Blakes	9 – Washington	5 – Galvan	Memorial Gymnasium (5,173); Nashville, TN
February 15, 2026; 11:00 a.m., SECN	No. 5	at Georgia	L 74–76	24–3 (10–3)	27 – Blakes	9 – Washington	6 – Blakes	Stegeman Coliseum (3,682); Athens, GA
February 22, 2026; 2:00 p.m., SECN+/ESPN+	No. 5	No. 16 Kentucky	W 81–79	25–3 (11–3)	35 – Blakes	9 – Tied	5 – Galvan	Memorial Gymnasium (6,277); Nashville, TN
February 26, 2026; 6:30 p.m., SECN+/ESPN+	No. 5	No. 24 Alabama	W 85–60	26–3 (12–3)	35 – Blakes	10 – Washington	9 – Galvan	Memorial Gymnasium (6,657); Nashville, TN
March 1, 2026; 1:00 p.m., ESPN	No. 5	at Tennessee; Rivalry	W 87–77	27–3 (13–3)	34 – Blakes	8 – Washington	5 – Galvan	Thompson–Boling Arena (12,037); Knoxville, TN
SEC tournament
March 6, 2026; 5:00 p.m., SECN	(2) No. 5	vs. (7) No. 24 Ole Miss; Quarterfinals	L 78–89	27–4	24 – Blakes	8 – Washington	4 – Galvan	Bon Secours Wellness Arena; Greenville, SC
NCAA tournament
March 21, 2026*; 6:00 p.m., ESPNews	(2 FW1) No. 6	(15 FW1) High Point; First Round	W 102–61	28–4	30 – Blakes	17 – Washington	6 – Galvan	Memorial Gymnasium (5,527); Nashville, TN
March 23, 2026*; 6:00 p.m., ESPN2	(2 FW1) No. 6	(7 FW1) Illinois; Second Round	W 75–57	29–4	25 – Blakes	7 – Blakes	9 – Blakes	Memorial Gymnasium (4,440); Nashville, TN
March 27, 2026*; 1:30 p.m., ESPN	(2 FW1) No. 6	vs. (6 FW1) No. 22 Notre Dame; Sweet Sixteen	L 64–67	29–5	26 – Blakes	10 – Mitchell	3 – Tied	Dickies Arena; Fort Worth, TX
*Non-conference game. ^{#}Rankings from AP Poll. (#) Tournament seedings in parentheses. FW1=Fort Worth 1. All times are in Central Time.

== Rankings ==
Ranking movements Legend: ██ Increase in ranking ██ Decrease in ranking
	Week																				
Poll	Pre	1	2	3	4	5	6	7	8	9	10	11	12	13	14	15	16	17	18	19	Final
AP	19	19	17	17	15	14	13	12	12*	7	5	5	5	7	5	5	5	5	6	6	
Coaches	21	19	17	17	14	13	11	11	11	6	5	4	6	8	5	6	5	5	6	6	

*AP did not release a week 8 poll.

== See also ==
- 2025–26 Vanderbilt Commodores men's basketball team
