= 2025–26 Georgia Lady Bulldogs basketball team =

Intercollegiate basketball season

2025–26 Georgia Lady Bulldogs basketball

Fort Myers Tip-Off Island Division champions

NCAA tournament, First Round
- Conference: Southeastern Conference

Ranking
- Coaches: No. 24
- AP: No. 24
- Record: 22–10 (8–8 SEC)
- Head coach: Katie Abrahamson-Henderson (4th season)
- Associate head coach: Tahnee Balerio
- Assistant coaches: Isoken Uzamere; Nykesha Sales; Ebone Henry-Harris; Aliyah Gregory
- Home arena: Stegeman Coliseum

2025–26 SEC women's basketball standings
	Conf.				Overall
Team	W		L	PCT	W		L	PCT
No. 2 South Carolina	15	–	1	.938	36	–	4	.900
No. 10 Vanderbilt	13	–	3	.813	29	–	5	.853
No. 4 Texas †	13	–	3	.813	35	–	4	.897
No. 8 LSU	12	–	4	.750	29	–	6	.829
No. 12 Oklahoma	11	–	5	.688	26	–	8	.765
Tennessee	8	–	8	.500	16	–	14	.533
No. 21 Ole Miss	8	–	8	.500	24	–	12	.667
Georgia	8	–	8	.500	22	–	10	.688
No. 14 Kentucky	8	–	8	.500	25	–	11	.694
Texas A&M	7	–	9	.438	14	–	13	.519
No. 24 Alabama	7	–	9	.438	24	–	11	.686
Florida	5	–	11	.313	18	–	15	.545
Mississippi State	5	–	11	.313	18	–	13	.581
Missouri	4	–	12	.250	17	–	17	.500
Auburn	3	–	13	.188	15	–	17	.469
Arkansas	1	–	15	.063	12	–	20	.375
† 2026 SEC tournament winner Rankings from AP poll

The 2025–26 Georgia Lady Bulldogs basketball team represented the University of Georgia during the 2025–26 NCAA Division I women's basketball season. The Lady Bulldogs, led by fourth-year head coach Katie Abrahamson-Henderson, played their home games at Stegeman Coliseum and compete as members of the Southeastern Conference (SEC).

== Previous season ==
The Lady Bulldogs finished the 2024–25 season 13–19, 4–12 SEC play to finish in twelfth place. As a No. 12 seed in the SEC Tournament, they defeated Arkansas in the first round before losing to Oklahoma in the second round.

== Offseason ==
=== Departures ===
Georgia departures
Name	Number	Pos.	Height	Year	Hometown	Reason for departure
Asia Avinger	1	G	5'7"	Senior	Cerritos, CA	Graduated
De'Mauri Flournoy	10	G	5'8"	Senior	Villa Rica, GA	Graduated
Roxane Mokolo	12	G	5'10"	Graduate student	Saint-Hubert, QC	Graduated
Fatima Diakhate	21	C	6'5"	(redshirt) Sophomore	Dakar, Senegal	Transferred to Pittsburgh
Nyah Leveretter	22	F	6'2"	(redshirt) Senior	Blythewood, SC	Graduated
Summer Davis	23	G	5'9"	Freshman	Detroit, MI	Transferred to Georgetown
Indya Davis	24	G	5'9"	Freshman	Detroit, MI	Transferred to Georgetown
Amiyah Evans	30	F	6'2"	Junior	Pensacola, FL	Transferred to Penn State

=== Incoming transfers ===
Georgia incoming transfers
Name	Number	Pos.	Height	Year	Hometown	Previous school
Dani Carnegie	3	G	5'9"	Sophomore	Mount Vernon, NY	Georgia Tech
Enjulina Gonzalez	11	G	5'9"	Junior	Miami, FL	Miami (OH)
Rylie Theuerkauf	14	G	5'9"	Junior	Tenafly, NY	Wake Forest
Aicha Ndour	21	C	6'6"	Graduate student	Somone, Senegal	Wichita State
Vera Ojenuwa	22	F	6'4"	Junior	Delta State, Nigeria	Arkansas

=== 2025 recruiting class ===
College recruiting
Name	Hometown	School	Height	Weight	Commit date
Zhen Craft; W	Forestville, MD	Bishop McNamara High School	6 ft 2 in (1.88 m)	N/A	
Zhen Craft; W	Recruit ratings: ESPN: (94)				
Aubrey Beckham; G	Dacula, GA	Hebron Christian Academy	5 ft 11 in (1.80 m)	N/A	
Aubrey Beckham; G	Recruit ratings: ESPN: (94)				
Jocelyn Faison; G	Fairburn, GA	Langston Hughes High School	6 ft 1 in (1.85 m)	N/A	
Jocelyn Faison; G	Recruit ratings: ESPN: (91)				
Overall recruit ranking:
Note: In many cases, Scout, Rivals, 247Sports, On3, and ESPN may conflict in their listings of height and weight.; In these cases, the average was taken. ESPN grades are on a 100-point scale.; Sources: "2025 Player Commits". ESPN. Archived from the original on September 26, 2025.

== Roster ==
2025–26 Georgia Lady Bulldogs women's basketball team
Players
Coaches

Pos.	#	Name	Height	Year	Previous school	Hometown
G	0	Trinity Turner	5 ft 6 in (1.68 m)	So	Dr. Phillips HS	Orlando, FL
G	1	Jocelyn Faison	6 ft 1 in (1.85 m)	Fr	Langston Hughes HS	Atlanta, GA
G	2	Savannah Henderson	6 ft 3 in (1.91 m)	RS Jr	Timber Creek HS	Orlando, FL
G	3	Dani Carnegie	5 ft 9 in (1.75 m)	So	Grayson HS; Georgia Tech	Mount Vernon, NY
F	4	Miyah Verse	6 ft 1 in (1.85 m)	RS So	Arizona Elite Prep	Dayton, OH
F	8	Zhen Craft	6 ft 2 in (1.88 m)	Fr	Bishop McNamara HS	Waldorf, MD
G	10	Aubrey Beckham	5 ft 11 in (1.8 m)	Fr	Hebron Christian Academy	Dacula, GA
G	11	Enjulina Gonzalez	5 ft 9 in (1.75 m)	Jr	Miami Christian School; Miami (OH)	Miami, FL
G	14	Rylie Theuerkauf	5 ft 9 in (1.75 m)	Jr	Tenafly HS; Wake Forest	Tenafly, NJ
C	21	Aicha Ndour	6 ft 6 in (1.98 m)	GS	Cushing Academy; Wichita State	Somone, Senegal
F	22	Vera Ojenuwa	6 ft 4 in (1.93 m)	Jr	Arkansas	Delta State, Nigeria
F	33	Mia Woolfolk	6 ft 3 in (1.91 m)	So	Manchester HS	Midlothian, VA

Head coach

- Katie Abrahamson-Henderson (Iowa)

Assistant coach(es)

- Tahnee Balerio (Missouri State)
- Isoken Uzamere (Hofstra)
- Nykesha Sales (Connecticut)
- Ebone Henry-Harris (Albany)
- Aliyah Gregory (Central Florida)

Legend

- (C) Team captain
- (S) Suspended
- (I) Ineligible
- (W) Walk-on
- Injured
- Current redshirt

Roster

== Schedule and results ==
Date time, TV	Rank^{#}	Opponent^{#}	Result	Record	High points	High rebounds	High assists	Site (attendance) city, state
Non-conference regular season
November 3, 2025*; 5:00 p.m., SECN+/ESPN+		Alabama State	W 73–44	1–0	15 – Woolfolk	11 – Verse	6 – Turner	Stegeman Coliseum (2,328); Athens, GA
November 6, 2025*; 6:30 p.m., SECN+/ESPN+		Furman	W 91–45	2–0	19 – Carnegie	8 – Tied	6 – Turner	Stegeman Coliseum (1,753); Athens, GA
November 10, 2025*; 6:30 p.m., SECN+/ESPN+		USC Upstate	W 78–44	3–0	19 – Theuerkauf	6 – Ojenuwa	5 – Craft	Stegeman Coliseum (1,406); Athens, GA
November 13, 2025*; 7:00 p.m.		at South Carolina State	W 85–49	4–0	22 – Carnegie	9 – Turner	8 – Turner	SHM Memorial Center (345); Orangeburg, SC
November 16, 2025*; 2:00 p.m., SECN+/ESPN+		Jacksonville State	W 76–51	5–0	16 – Turner	7 – Verse	4 – Carnegie	Stegeman Coliseum (2,154); Athens, GA
November 20, 2025*; 6:30 p.m., SECN+/ESPN+		North Florida	W 92–46	6–0	22 – Carnegie	7 – Ojenuwa	7 – Turner	Stegeman Coliseum (1,544); Athens, GA
November 23, 2025*; 2:00 p.m., SECN+/ESPN+		Georgia Tech	W 87–59	7–0	23 – Carnegie	6 – Woolfolk	5 – Turner	Stegeman Coliseum (3,746); Athens, GA
November 28, 2025*; 7:30 p.m., Ion		vs. Kansas; Fort Myers Tip-Off Island Division	W 68–62	8–0	23 – Carnegie	8 – Verse	4 – Turner	Suncoast Credit Union Arena (944); Fort Myers, FL
November 29, 2025*; 5:00 p.m., Ion		vs. Butler; Fort Myers Tip-Off Island Division	W 80–54	9–0	15 – Gonzalez	6 – Woolfolk	7 – Gonzalez	Suncoast Credit Union Arena (932); Fort Myers, FL
December 3, 2025*; 5:00 p.m., ESPNU		at Florida State; ACC–SEC Challenge	W 80–60	10–0	20 – Woolfolk	9 – Carnegie	6 – Turner	Donald L. Tucker Civic Center (1,155); Tallahassee, FL
December 15, 2025*; 11:00 a.m., SECN		North Carolina A&T	W 77–49	11–0	20 – Carnegie	10 – Carnegie	6 – Carnegie	Stegeman Coliseum (5,425); Athens, GA
December 19, 2025*; 7:00 p.m., ESPN+		vs. VCU; 4 Tha Culture Holiday Classic	W 72–53	12–0	23 – Turner	9 – Carnegie	5 – Turner	Henrico Sports & Events Center (273); Henrico, VA
December 21, 2025*; 12:00 p.m., ESPN+		vs. Coppin State; 4 Tha Culture Holiday Classic	W 82–55	13–0	20 – Turner	8 – Craft	7 – Carnegie	Henrico Sports & Events Center; Henrico, VA
December 29, 2025*; 12:00 p.m., SECN+/ESPN+		Charleston Southern	W 97–52	14–0	16 – Craft	13 – Craft	5 – Beckham	Stegeman Coliseum (1,972); Athens, GA
SEC regular season
January 1, 2026; 7:30 p.m., SECN+/ESPN+		at No. 15 Ole Miss	L 62–79	14–1 (0–1)	24 – Carnegie	8 – Carnegie	5 – Turner	SJB Pavilion (2,595); Oxford, MS
January 4, 2026; 2:00 p.m., SECN+/ESPN+		Texas A&M	W 64–56 ^{OT}	15–1 (1–1)	23 – Carnegie	10 – Carnegie	6 – Turner	Stegeman Coliseum (3,944); Athens, GA
January 8, 2026; 6:30 p.m., SECN+/ESPN+		No. 12 LSU	L 59–80	15–2 (1–2)	24 – Carnegie	7 – Tied	3 – Carnegie	Stegeman Coliseum (4,857); Athens, GA
January 11, 2026; 2:00 p.m., SECN		at No. 3 South Carolina; We Back Pat	L 43–65	15–3 (1–3)	16 – Theuerkauf	10 – Turner	5 – Turner	Colonial Life Arena (15,536); Columbia, SC
January 18, 2026; 12:00 p.m., SECN		No. 16 Ole Miss	W 82–59	16–3 (2–3)	32 – Carnegie	11 – Carnegie	6 – Turner	Stegeman Coliseum (3,359); Athens, GA
January 22, 2026; 7:30 p.m., SECN+/ESPN+		at Arkansas	W 76–66	17–3 (3–3)	31 – Carnegie	7 – Tied	10 – Turner	Bud Walton Arena (2,229); Fayetteville, AR
January 24, 2026; 1:00 p.m., SECN+/ESPN+		at No. 11 Kentucky	W 72–67	18–3 (4–3)	19 – Tied	13 – Woolfolk	8 – Carnegie	Memorial Coliseum (4,195); Lexington, KY
January 29, 2026; 6:30 p.m., SECN	No. 23	No. 24 Alabama	L 53–68	18–4 (4–4)	13 – Woolfolk	5 – Woolfolk	3 – Tied	Stegeman Coliseum (2,281); Athens, GA
February 5, 2026; 6:30 p.m., SECN+/ESPN+		No. 19 Tennessee	L 77–82 ^{OT}	18–5 (4–5)	25 – Carnegie	6 – Tied	6 – Turner	Stegeman Coliseum (2,844); Athens, GA
February 8, 2026; 4:00 p.m., SECN		at Missouri	W 85–66	19–5 (5–5)	22 – Theuerkauf	9 – Turner	8 – Turner	Mizzou Arena (3,968); Columbia, MO
February 12, 2026; 7:30 p.m., SECN+/ESPN+		at Mississippi State	L 71–85	19–6 (5–6)	26 – Theuerkauf	6 – Turner	5 – Turner	Humphrey Coliseum (3,651); Starkville, MS
February 15, 2026; 12:00 p.m., SECN		No. 5 Vanderbilt	W 76–74	20–6 (6–6)	29 – Carnegie	8 – Carnegie	6 – Turner	Stegeman Coliseum (3,682); Athens, GA
February 19, 2026; 6:30 p.m., SECN	No. 24	No. 11 Oklahoma	L 67–71	20–7 (6–7)	29 – Woolfolk	9 – Woolfolk	5 – Turner	Stegeman Coliseum (2,426); Athens, GA
February 23, 2026; 7:30 p.m., SECN	No. 23	at Auburn	W 74–52	21–7 (7–7)	17 – Carnegie	7 – Verse	3 – Woolfolk	Neville Arena (3,680); Auburn, AL
February 26, 2026; 10:00 p.m., SECN	No. 23	at No. 4 Texas	L 50–79	21–8 (7–8)	16 – Theuerkauf	7 – Turner	2 – Tied	Moody Center (10,136); Austin, TX
March 1, 2026; 3:00 p.m., SECN+/ESPN+	No. 23	Florida	W 71–58	22–8 (8–8)	26 – Carnegie	10 – Woolfolk	5 – Turner	Stegeman Coliseum (3,432); Athens, GA
SEC Tournament
March 5, 2026; 11:00 a.m., SECN	(8) No. 22	vs. (9) No. 17 Kentucky; Second round	L 61–76	22–9	18 – Carnegie	4 – Tied	4 – Carnegie	Bon Secours Wellness Arena; Greenville, SC
NCAA Tournament
March 21, 2026*; 1:30 p.m., ESPN2	(7 S4) No. 24	vs. (10 S4) Virginia; First Round	L 73–82 ^{OT}	22–10	28 – Johnson	11 – Smith	6 – Johnson	Carver–Hawkeye Arena (14,332); Iowa City, IA
*Non-conference game. ^{#}Rankings from AP Poll. (#) Tournament seedings in parentheses. All times are in Eastern Time.

== Rankings ==
Ranking movements Legend: ██ Increase in ranking ██ Decrease in ranking — = Not ranked RV = Received votes
	Week																				
Poll	Pre	1	2	3	4	5	6	7	8	9	10	11	12	13	14	15	16	17	18	19	Final
AP	—	—	—	—	RV	RV	RV	RV	RV*	RV	RV	RV	23	RV	RV	24	23	22	24	24	
Coaches	—	—	—	—	RV	RV	—	RV	—	—	—	RV	25	RV	RV	25	24	22	24	24	

*AP did not release a week 8 poll.

== See also ==
- 2025–26 Georgia Bulldogs basketball team
