= 2025–26 Alabama Crimson Tide women's basketball team =

Intercollegiate basketball season

2025–26 Alabama Crimson Tide women's basketball

Baha Mar Hoops Pink Flamingo Junkanoo Division champions

NCAA tournament, Second Round
- Conference: Southeastern Conference

Ranking
- AP: No. 24
- Record: 24–11 (7–9 SEC)
- Head coach: Kristy Curry (13th season)
- Assistant coaches: Brooks Donald-Williams; Kelly Curry; Tennille Adams; Sydney-Anne Cottrell; Chelsea Dungee
- Home arena: Coleman Coliseum

2025–26 SEC women's basketball standings
	Conf.				Overall
Team	W		L	PCT	W		L	PCT
No. 2 South Carolina	15	–	1	.938	36	–	4	.900
No. 10 Vanderbilt	13	–	3	.813	29	–	5	.853
No. 4 Texas †	13	–	3	.813	35	–	4	.897
No. 8 LSU	12	–	4	.750	29	–	6	.829
No. 12 Oklahoma	11	–	5	.688	26	–	8	.765
Tennessee	8	–	8	.500	16	–	14	.533
No. 21 Ole Miss	8	–	8	.500	24	–	12	.667
Georgia	8	–	8	.500	22	–	10	.688
No. 14 Kentucky	8	–	8	.500	25	–	11	.694
Texas A&M	7	–	9	.438	14	–	13	.519
No. 24 Alabama	7	–	9	.438	24	–	11	.686
Florida	5	–	11	.313	18	–	15	.545
Mississippi State	5	–	11	.313	18	–	13	.581
Missouri	4	–	12	.250	17	–	17	.500
Auburn	3	–	13	.188	15	–	17	.469
Arkansas	1	–	15	.063	12	–	20	.375
† 2026 SEC tournament winner Rankings from AP poll

The 2025–26 Alabama Crimson Tide women's basketball team represented the University of Alabama during the 2025–26 NCAA Division I women's basketball season. The Crimson Tide, led by thirteenth-year head coach Kristy Curry, played their home games at Coleman Coliseum in Tuscaloosa, Alabama and competed as members of the Southeastern Conference (SEC).

== Previous season ==
The Crimson Tide finished the 2024–25 season 24–9, 10–6 in SEC play to finish in a tie for sixth place. As the No. 6 seed in the SEC tournament, they were upset by Florida in the second round. They received an at-large bid to the NCAA tournament as the No. 5 seed Birmingham 2 region. They defeated Green Bay in the first round before losing in a double overtime thriller to Maryland in the second round.

== Offseason ==
=== Departures ===
Alabama departures
Name	Number	Pos.	Height	Year	Hometown	Reason for left
Christabel Ezumah	1	F	6'2"	Graduate Student	Sugar Hill, GA	Graduated
Chloe Spreen	2	G	5'10"	Freshman	Bedford, IN	Transferred to Indiana
Sarah Ashlee Barker	3	G	6'0"	Graduate Student	Birmingham, AL	Graduated/2025 WNBA draft; selected 9th overall by Los Angeles Sparks
JeAnna Cunningham	13	C	6'5"	Graduate Student	Long Island, NY	Graduated
Zaay Green	14	G	6'2"	Graduate Student	Duncanville, TX	Graduated/2025 WNBA draft; selected 32nd overall by Washington Mystics
Aaliyah Nye	32	G/F	6'0"	Graduate Student	East Lansing, MI	Graduated/2025 WNBA draft; selected 13th overall by Las Vegas Aces

=== Incoming transfers ===
Alabama incoming transfers
Name	Number	Pos.	Height	Year	Hometown	Previous school
Waiata Jennings	7	G	5'9"	Senior	Rotorua, New Zealand	Baylor
Ta'Mia Scott	15	G	6'0"	Senior	Clarksville, TN	Middle Tennessee
Alancia Ramsey	32	F	6'0"	Junior	Delray Beach, FL	Coastal Carolina

=== 2025 recruiting class ===
College recruiting
Name	Hometown	School	Height	Weight	Commit date
Lourdes Da Silva Costa; F	Montverde, FL	Montverde Academy	6 ft 2 in (1.88 m)	N/A	
Lourdes Da Silva Costa; F	Recruit ratings: ESPN: (4)				
Ace Austin; PG	Spring Garden, AL	Spring Garden High School	5 ft 7 in (1.70 m)	N/A	
Ace Austin; PG	Recruit ratings: ESPN: (4)				
Tianna Chambers; G	Englewood, CO	Cherry Creek High School	6 ft 0 in (1.83 m)	N/A	
Tianna Chambers; G	Recruit ratings: ESPN: (4)				
Joy Egbuna; F	Mansfield, TX	Faith Family Academy	6 ft 3 in (1.91 m)	N/A	
Joy Egbuna; F	Recruit ratings: ESPN: (4)				
Overall recruit ranking:
Note: In many cases, Scout, Rivals, 247Sports, On3, and ESPN may conflict in their listings of height and weight.; In these cases, the average was taken. ESPN grades are on a 100-point scale.; Sources: "2025 Player Commits". ESPN. Archived from the original on September 23, 2025.

== Roster ==
2025–26 Alabama Crimson Tide women's basketball team
Players
Coaches

Pos.	#	Name	Height	Year	Previous school	Hometown
G	1	Ace Austin	5 ft 7 in (1.7 m)	Fr	Spring Garden HS	Spring Garden, AL
G	4	Eris Lester	5 ft 11 in (1.8 m)	So	Montverde Academy	Jacksonville, FL
G	5	Reychel Douglas	6 ft 0 in (1.83 m)	RS So	Millbrook HS	Raleigh, NC
G	7	Waiata Jennings	5 ft 9 in (1.75 m)	Sr	Baylor	Rotorua, New Zealand
G	11	Tianna Chambers	6 ft 1 in (1.85 m)	Fr	Cherry Creek HS	Aurora, CO
G	15	Ta'Mia Scott	6 ft 0 in (1.83 m)	Sr	Clarksville HS; Middle Tennessee	Clarksville, TN
F	17	Lourdes Da Silva Costa	6 ft 3 in (1.91 m)	Fr	Montverde Academy	Stockholm, Sweden
G	20	Diana Collins	5 ft 9 in (1.75 m)	Jr	Brookwood HS; Ohio State	Lilburn, GA
F	21	Essence Cody	6 ft 4 in (1.93 m)	Jr	Valdosta HS	Valdosta, GA
G	22	Karly Weathers	5 ft 11 in (1.8 m)	Sr	Loretto HS	Loretto, TN
G	23	Jessica Timmons	5 ft 8 in (1.73 m)	RS Sr	North Mecklenburg HS; NC State	Charlotte, NC
F	24	Leah Brooks	6 ft 3 in (1.91 m)	So	Hazel Green HS	Toney, AL
F	25	Joy Egbuna	6 ft 3 in (1.91 m)	Fr	Faith Family Academy (TX)	Arlington, TX
F	31	Naomi Jones	6 ft 4 in (1.93 m)	RS So	Jackson HS	Jackson, AL
F	32	Alancia Ramsey	6 ft 0 in (1.83 m)	Jr	St. Thomas Aquinas HS; Coastal Carolina	Delray Beach, FL

Head coach

- Kristy Curry (Louisiana–Monroe)

Assistant coach(es)

- Brooks Donald-Williams (Mississippi State)
- Kelly Curry (Texas A&M)
- Tennille Adams (Arkansas)
- Sydney-Anne Cottrell (Texas A&M–Corpus Christi)
- Chelsea Dungee (Arkansas)

Legend

- (C) Team captain
- (S) Suspended
- (I) Ineligible
- (W) Walk-on
- Injured
- Current redshirt

Roster
Last update: February 19, 2025

== Schedule and results ==
Date time, TV	Rank^{#}	Opponent^{#}	Result	Record	High points	High rebounds	High assists	Site (attendance) city, state
Exhibition
October 16, 2025*; 12:00 p.m.		vs. Florida State	W 91–71		16 – Tied	7 – Tied	6 – Weathers	Boutwell Memorial Auditorium (1,721); Birmingham, AL
October 26, 2025*; 2:00 p.m.		West Florida	W 93–44		20 – Timmons	11 – Weathers	6 – Weathers	Coleman Coliseum (324); Tuscaloosa, AL
Non-conference regular season
November 3, 2025*; 4:00 p.m., SECN+/ESPN+		Stetson	W 82–73	1–0	21 – Timmons	7 – Weathers	5 – Timmons	Coleman Coliseum (350); Tuscaloosa, AL
November 6, 2025*; 6:00 p.m., SECN+/ESPN+		McNeese	W 64–44	2–0	23 – Cody	11 – Cody	4 – Austin	Coleman Coliseum (2,445); Tuscaloosa, AL
November 10, 2025*; 6:00 p.m., SECN+/ESPN+		Alcorn State	W 92–39	3–0	17 – Cody	8 – Timmons	7 – Timmons	Coleman Coliseum (2,428); Tuscaloosa, AL
November 17, 2025*; 6:00 p.m., SECN+/ESPN+		Alabama A&M	W 66–43	4–0	13 – Tied	7 – Cody	5 – Weathers	Coleman Coliseum (2,406); Tuscaloosa, AL
November 19, 2025*; 6:00 p.m., SECN+/ESPN+		Samford	W 84–45	5–0	21 – Austin	6 – Tied	5 – Austin	Coleman Coliseum (2,472); Tuscaloosa, AL
November 24, 2025*; 5:30 p.m., FloCollege		vs. Harvard; Pink Flamingo Championship Junkanoo Division semifinals	W 80–60	6–0	25 – Timmons	10 – Weathers	5 – Ramsey	Baha Mar Convention Center (317); Nassau, Bahamas
November 26, 2025*; 3:00 p.m., FloCollege		vs. Minnesota; Pink Flamingo Championship Junkanoo Division finals	W 63–58	7–0	18 – Tied	7 – Weathers	4 – Weathers	Baha Mar Convention Center (247); Nassau, Bahamas
December 1, 2025*; 11:00 a.m., SECN+/ESPN+		Kennesaw State	W 79–65	8–0	21 – Timmons	7 – Tied	5 – Timmons	Coleman Coliseum (2,467); Tuscaloosa, AL
December 4, 2025*; 6:00 p.m., ESPNU		Clemson; ACC–SEC Challenge	W 72–48	9–0	21 – Cody	7 – Jones	4 – Timmons	Coleman Coliseum (2,525); Tuscaloosa, AL
December 7, 2025*; 4:00 p.m., SECN+/ESPN+		Louisiana–Monroe	W 75–38	10–0	17 – Timmons	7 – Jones	4 – Tied	Coleman Coliseum (2,524); Tuscaloosa, AL
December 14, 2025*; 3:00 p.m., SECN		Jackson State	W 62–51	11–0	20 – Collins	7 – Jones	3 – Tied	Coleman Coliseum (2,435); Tuscaloosa, AL
December 16, 2025*; 6:00 p.m., SECN+/ESPN+		Sam Houston	W 73–36	12–0	12 – Tied	9 – Tied	3 – Tied	Coleman Coliseum (2,224); Tuscaloosa, AL
December 17, 2025*; 4:00 p.m., SECN+/ESPN+		Tulane	W 81–52	13–0	18 – Timmons	10 – Jones	7 – Collins	Coleman Coliseum (2,169); Tuscaloosa, AL
December 21, 2025*; 2:00 p.m., SECN+/ESPN+		Troy	W 77–59	14–0	23 – Timmons	12 – Timmons	4 – Tied	Coleman Coliseum (2,421); Tuscaloosa, AL
SEC regular season
January 1, 2026; 6:00 p.m., SECN+/ESPN+		at No. 3 South Carolina	L 57–83	14–1 (0–1)	17 – Collins	5 – Jones	3 – Tied	Colonial Life Arena (14,367); Columbia, SC
January 4, 2026; 2:00 p.m., SECN+/ESPN+		Arkansas	W 77–48	15–1 (1–1)	16 – Scott	7 – Ramsey	6 – Weathers	Coleman Coliseum (2,695); Tuscaloosa, AL
January 8, 2026; 6:00 p.m., SECN		No. 6 Kentucky	W 64–51	16–1 (2–1)	24 – Timmons	8 – Tied	5 – Austin	Coleman Coliseum (2,911); Tuscaloosa, AL
January 12, 2026; 6:00 p.m., SECN	No. 21	at Missouri; We Back Pat	W 74−63	17−1 (3−1)	23 – Weathers	7 – Tied	3 – Tied	Mizzou Arena (2,747); Columbia, MO
January 15, 2026; 8:00 p.m., SECN	No. 21	at Auburn	L 54–58	17–2 (3–2)	16 – Timmons	11 – Weathers	3 – Weathers	Neville Arena (3,464); Auburn, AL
January 18, 2026; 1:00 p.m., SECN	No. 21	No. 20 Tennessee	L 59–70	17–3 (3–3)	22 – Timmons	11 – Jones	3 – Timmons	Coleman Coliseum (4,185); Tuscaloosa, AL
January 25, 2026; 2:00 p.m., SECN+/ESPN+	No. 23	Mississippi State	W 85–78	18–3 (4–3)	28 – Timmons	6 – Tied	6 – Weathers	Coleman Coliseum (2,791); Tuscaloosa, AL
January 29, 2026; 5:30 p.m., SECN	No. 24	at No. 23 Georgia	W 68–53	19–3 (5–3)	16 – Cody	8 – Tied	5 – Weathers	Stegeman Coliseum (2,281); Athens, GA
February 1, 2026; 11:00 a.m., SECN	No. 24	at No. 6 LSU; Play4Kay	L 63–103	19–4 (5–4)	15 – Timmons	6 – Tied	3 – Weathers	Pete Maravich Assembly Center (12,054); Baton Rouge, LA
February 5, 2026; 8:00 p.m., SECN	No. 21	No. 13 Ole Miss; Play4Kay	W 64–63	20–4 (6–4)	23 – Timmons	7 – Timmons	2 – Weathers	Coleman Coliseum (2,625); Tuscaloosa, AL
February 8, 2026; 5:00 p.m., SECN	No. 21	at Texas A&M; Play4Kay	L 69–72	20–5 (6–5)	19 – Timmons	8 – Timmons	6 – Collins	Reed Arena (2,498); College Station, TX
February 15, 2026; 3:00 p.m., SECN	No. 23	No. 10 Oklahoma	L 71–79	20–6 (6–6)	17 – Scott	6 – Cody	4 – Scott	Coleman Coliseum (3,463); Tuscaloosa, AL
February 19, 2026; 7:30 p.m., SECN	No. 25	No. 3 South Carolina	L 57–76	20–7 (6–7)	14 – Scott	5 – Cody	4 – Weathers	Coleman Coliseum (3,703); Tuscaloosa, AL
February 22, 2026; 11:00 a.m., SECN	No. 25	at Florida	W 76–71	21–7 (7–7)	34 – Timmons	6 – Tied	9 – Weathers	O'Connell Center (2,351); Gainesville, FL
February 26, 2026; 6:30 p.m., SECN+/ESPN+	No. 24	at No. 5 Vanderbilt	L 60–85	21–8 (7–8)	16 – Timmons	7 – Tied	3 – Weathers	Memorial Gymnasium (6,657); Nashville, TN
March 1, 2026; 11:00 a.m., SECN	No. 24	No. 4 Texas	L 65–72	21–9 (7–9)	24 – Timmons	6 – Tied	5 – Weathers	Coleman Coliseum (2,891); Tuscaloosa, AL
SEC tournament
March 4, 2026; 7:30 p.m., SECN	(11)	vs. (14) Missouri; First Round	W 65–48	22–9	14 – Austin	16 – Weathers	6 – Weathers	Bon Secours Wellness Arena (5,072); Greenville, SC
March 5, 2026; 7:30 p.m., SECN	(11)	vs. (6) Tennessee; Second Round	W 76–64	23–9	23 – Timmons	6 – Jones	7 – Weathers	Bon Secours Wellness Arena (5,810); Greenville, SC
March 6, 2026; 7:30 p.m., SECN	(11)	vs. (3) No. 4 Texas; Quarterfinals	L 60–83	23–10	8 – Tied	6 – Egbuna	3 – Weathers	Bon Secours Wellness Arena; Greenville, SC
NCAA tournament
March 21, 2026*; 1:30 p.m., ESPNews	(6 FW3)	vs. (11 FW3) Rhode Island; First Round	W 68–55	24–10	21 – Timmons	6 – Tied	4 – Weathers	KFC Yum! Center (5,895); Louisville, KY
March 23, 2026*; 11:00 a.m., ESPN	(6 FW3)	at (3 FW3) No. 13 Louisville; Second Round	L 68–69	24–11	17 – Austin	5 – Weathers	5 – Weathers	KFC Yum! Center (5,734); Louisville, KY
*Non-conference game. ^{#}Rankings from AP poll. (#) Tournament seedings in parentheses. FW3=Forth Worth 3. All times are in Central.

== Rankings ==
Ranking movements Legend: ██ Increase in ranking ██ Decrease in ranking — = Not ranked RV = Received votes
	Week																				
Poll	Pre	1	2	3	4	5	6	7	8	9	10	11	12	13	14	15	16	17	18	19	Final
AP	—	—	—	—	RV	RV	RV	RV	RV*	RV	21	23	24	21	23	25	24	RV	RV	RV	24
Coaches	RV	RV	RV	RV	RV	25	24	25	24	24	21	23	22	23	23	24	23	25	RV	RV	RV

*AP did not release a week 8 poll.

== See also ==
- 2025–26 Alabama Crimson Tide men's basketball team
