= Howard Bison women's basketball =

Basketball team that represents Howard University

Howard Bison
2025–26 Howard Bison women's basketball team
- University: Howard University
- Head coach: Ty Grace (10th season)
- Location: Washington, D.C.
- Arena: Burr Gymnasium (capacity: 2,700)
- Conference: MEAC
- Nickname: Bison
- Colors: Navy blue and white

NCAA Division I tournament appearances
- 1982, 1996, 1997, 1998, 2001, 2022, 2026

Conference tournament champions
- 1982, 1985, 1987, 1988, 1989, 1990, 1996, 1997, 1998, 2001, 2022, 2026

Conference regular-season champions
- 1987, 1997, 1998, 2000, 2001, 2002, 2022, 2026

Uniforms
Home	Away

The Howard Bison women's basketball team represents Howard University in women's basketball. The school competes in the Mid-Eastern Athletic Conference in Division I of the National Collegiate Athletic Association (NCAA). The Bison play their home games at Burr Gymnasium in Washington, D.C.

== History ==
Howard has won the MEAC Tournament 11 times, but they have only competed in six NCAA Tournaments due to the MEAC champion not going to the Tournament from 1983 to 1994. Sanya Tyler was the coach for all but one of the Bison's tournament championships in her tenure, beginning in 1980. In the 1982 Tournament, they lost to Long Beach 95–57 in the first round. In the 1996 Tournament, they lost 94–63 to Connecticut in the first round. In 1997, they lost 111–59 to Stanford in the first round. In 1998, they lost 91–71 to North Carolina in the first round. In 2001, they lost 100–61 to Iowa State. They have appeared in the WNIT twice (2012 and 2013). In the former, they lost 59–56 to Virginia. In the latter, they lost to Penn 65–60, both times being in the first round.

== Postseason results ==
=== NCAA tournament ===
The Bison have appeared in seven NCAA Tournaments, with a combined record of 1–7.

Year	Seed	Round	Opponent	Result
1982	#8	First Round	#1 Long Beach State	L 57–95
1996	#16	First Round	#1 Connecticut	L 63–94
1997	#16	First Round	#1 Stanford	L 59–111
1998	#15	First Round	#2 North Carolina	L 71–91
2001	#15	First Round	#2 Iowa State	L 61–100
2022	#16	First Four; First Round	#16 Incarnate Word #1 South Carolina	W 55–51; L 21–79
2026	#14	First Round	#3 Ohio State	L 54–75
