= Jazmone Turner =

American basketball coach and player

Biographical details
- Education: Muskingum (2012); Ohio Valley (2016); Ohio (2019)

Playing career
- 2008–2011: Muskingum

Coaching career (HC unless noted)
- 2012–2013: Trotwood-Madison HS (asst.)
- 2013–2014: Northmont HS (junior varsity HC)
- 2014–2015: Ohio Valley (GA)
- 2015–2016: Ohio Valley (interim HC)
- 2016–2017: Ohio Valley
- 2017–2020: Coppin State (assoc. HC)
- 2020–2021: Indiana State (asst.)
- 2021–2023: Delaware State (asst.)
- 2023–2024: Delaware State (interim HC)
- 2024–2026: Delaware State

Jazmone Turner is an American basketball coach and former player who recently was the head coach of the Delaware State Hornets women's basketball team.

== Coaching career ==
After spending the 2023–24 season as interim head coach, Turner was named permanent head coach of the Delaware State Hornets women's basketball team on March 23, 2024.
