= Burr Gymnasium =

American university sports arena

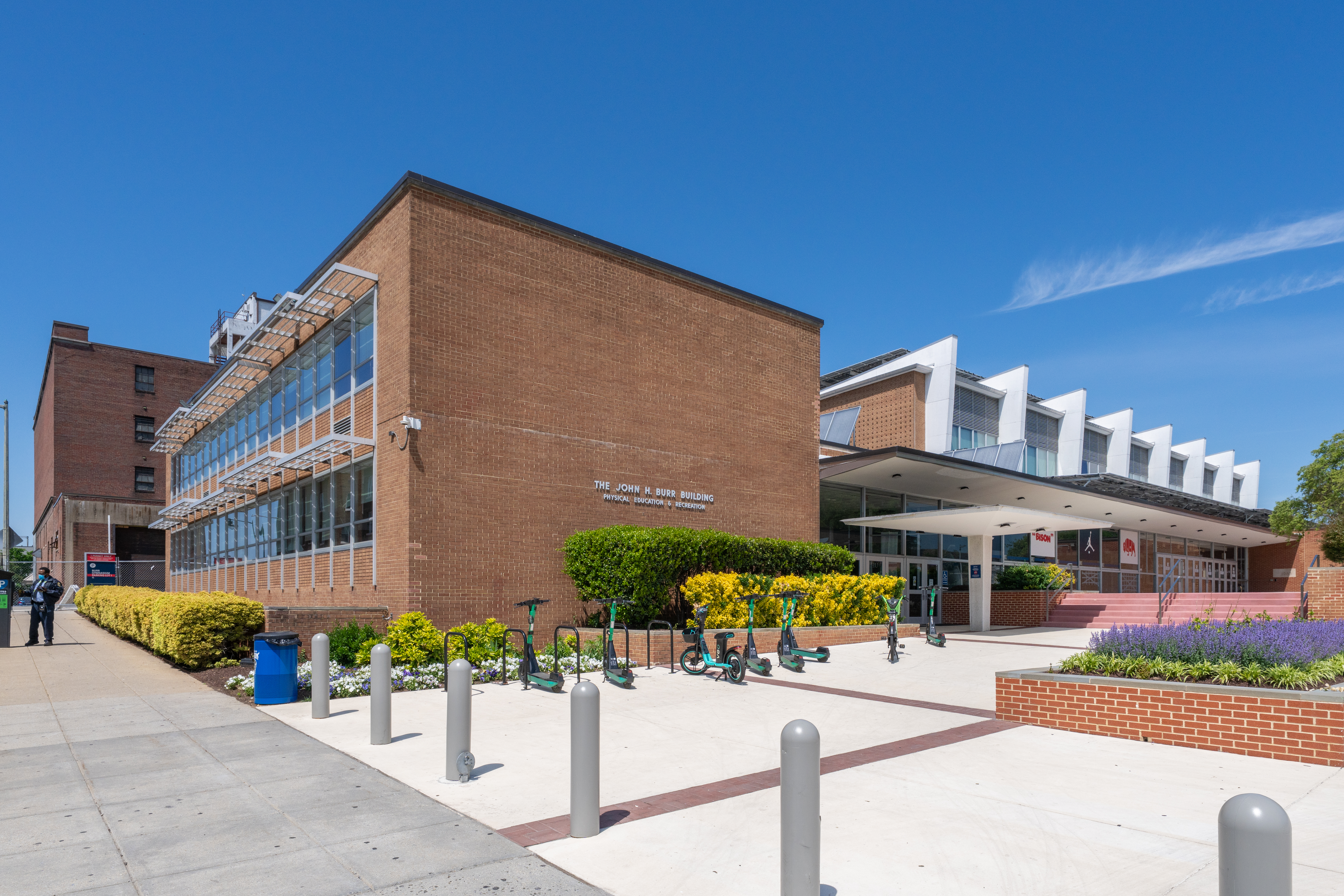
- Interactive map of Burr Gymnasium
- Location: 2400 6th St NW, Washington, D.C. 20059
- Coordinates: 38.9264°N 77.0221°W
- Capacity: 2,700
- Surface: Hardwood

Tenant
- Howard Bison

Burr Gymnasium is a multi-purpose arena in Washington, D.C., which opened in 1963. It is home to the Howard University Bison men's and women's basketball teams and women's volleyball team. It is named after John Harold Burr Jr., chairman of the physical education department from 1923 to 1958. It has a seating capacity of 2,700.

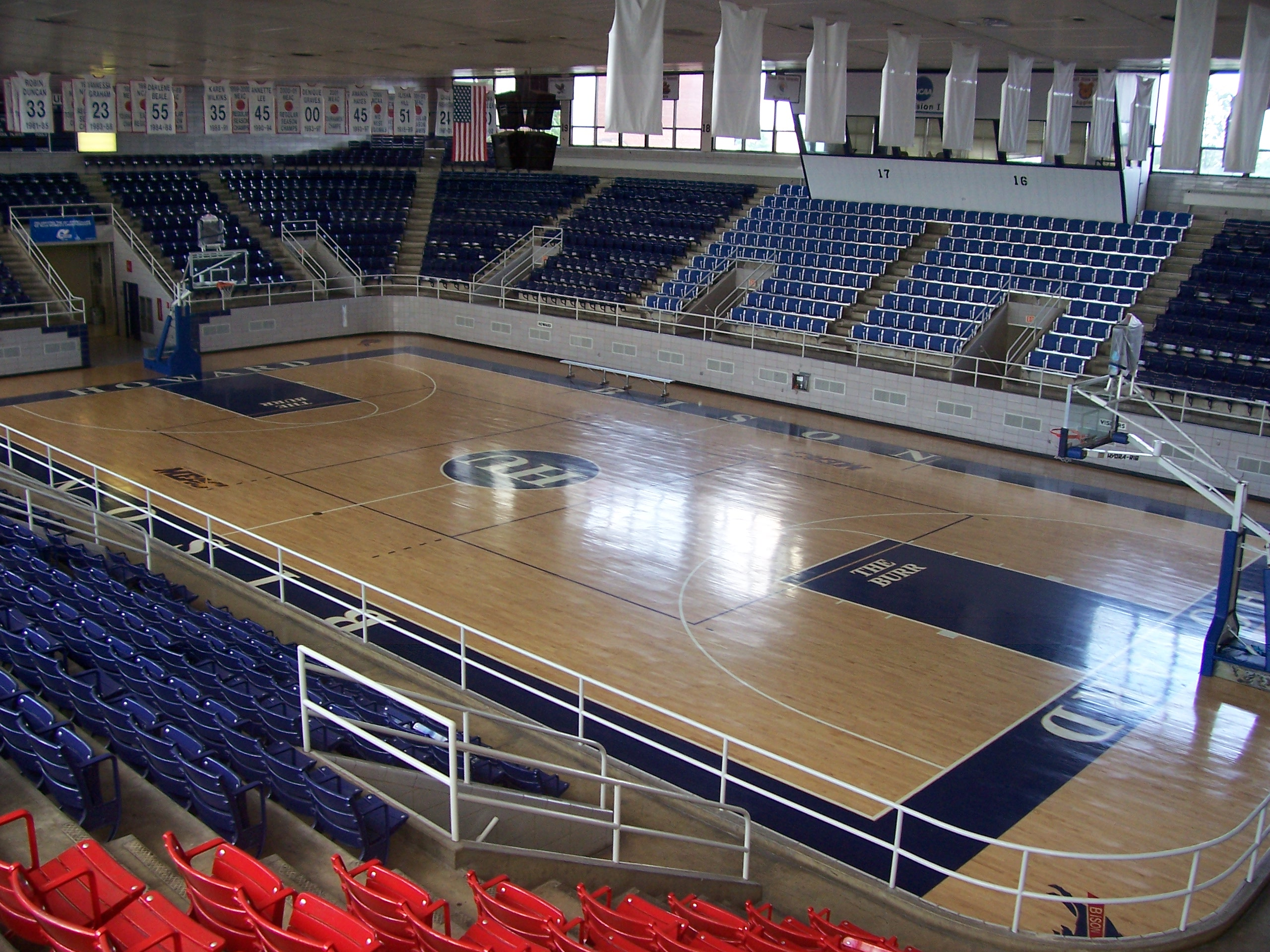
Burr Gymnasium, Howard University athletic venue

The Burr Gymnasium Pool located in the gym is home to the men's and women's swimming and diving teams.

== See also ==
- List of NCAA Division I basketball arenas
