= 2026 NCAA Division I women's basketball championship game =

American collegiate basketball final

National championship game
South Carolina Gamecocks	UCLA Bruins
SEC	Big Ten
(36–3)	(36–1)
51	79
Head coach: Dawn Staley	Head coach: Cori Close
- AP: 4
- Coaches: 4
- AP: 2
- Coaches: 2
	1	2	3	4	Total
South Carolina Gamecocks	10	13	9	19	51
UCLA Bruins	21	15	25	18	79
- Date: April 5, 2026
- Venue: Mortgage Matchup Center, Phoenix, Arizona
- MVP: Lauren Betts, UCLA
- Attendance: 15,856

United States TV coverage
- Network: ABC
- Announcers: Ryan Ruocco (play-by-play); Rebecca Lobo (analyst); Holly Rowe (sideline)
- Nielsen Ratings: 3.9 (9.88 million viewers)

The 2026 NCAA Division I women's basketball championship game was the final game of the 2026 NCAA Division I women's basketball tournament. It determined the champion of the 2025–26 NCAA Division I women's basketball season and was contested by the No. 1 seed South Carolina Gamecocks from the Southeastern Conference (SEC) and the No. 1 seed UCLA Bruins from the Big Ten Conference. The game was played on April 5, 2026, at Mortgage Matchup Center in Phoenix, Arizona. This was the first time that Phoenix hosted the national championship game. The Bruins won the game 79–51 for the program's first NCAA title, and Lauren Betts was named the Most Outstanding Player. The Gamecocks lost their second straight title game.

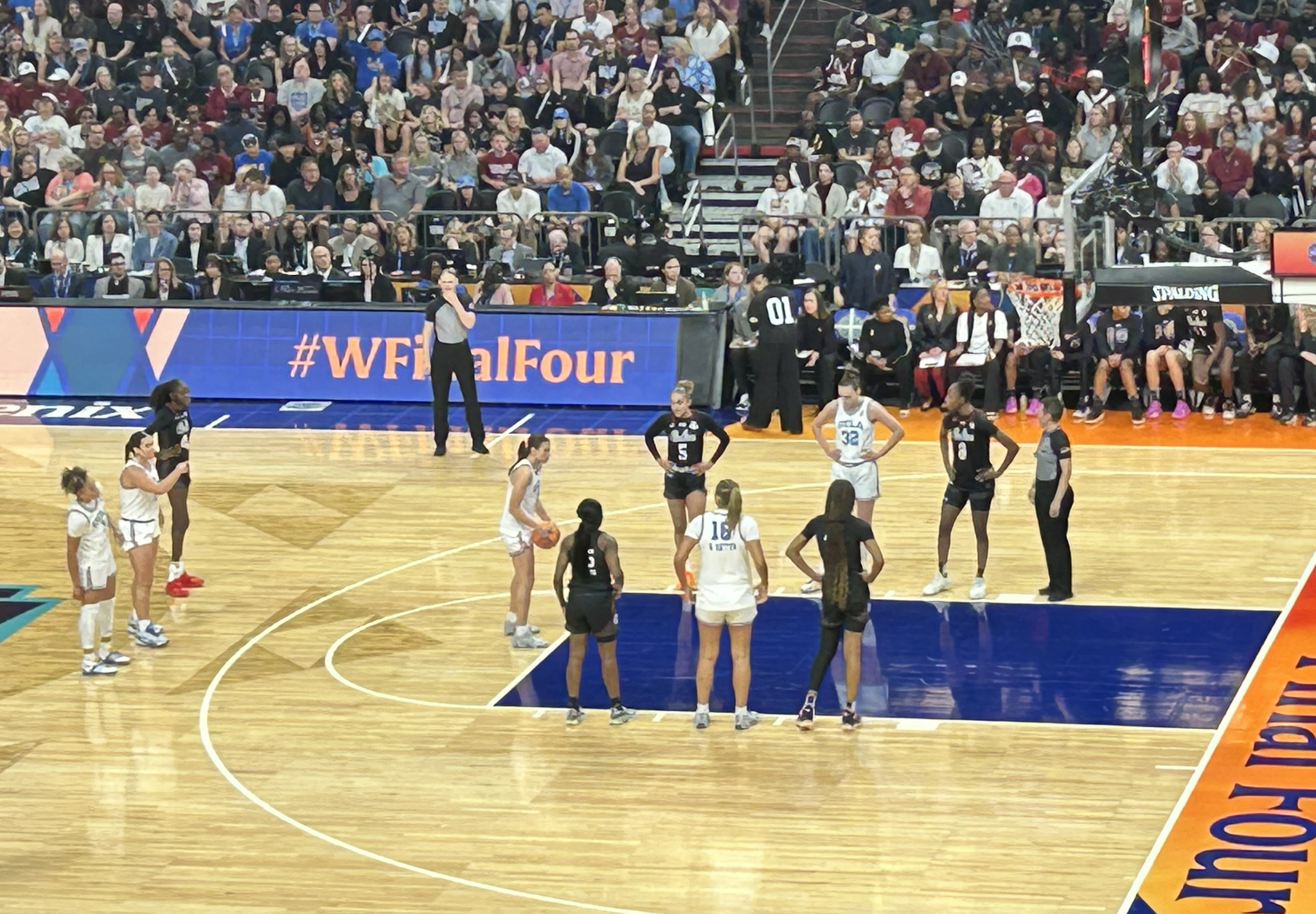
UCLA's Gabriela Jaquez shoots a free throw.

== Participants ==
=== South Carolina Gamecocks ===
Coming off their 82–59 loss in the 2025 national championship game to UConn, South Carolina won the 2025–26 SEC regular season for the 10th time and advanced to the SEC tournament championship, which they lost to Texas. A No. 1 seed in the NCAA tournament, the Gamecocks advanced to the championship with a 62–48 win in the semifinals over the Huskies, ending their 52-game winning streak. It was South Carolina's third consecutive national championship game, and their fourth in five seasons. They were seeking their fourth national title in nine seasons. The Gamecocks were led by Joyce Edwards, who was named a second-team All-American, and Raven Johnson, a third-team All-American selection and the SEC Defensive Player of the Year.

=== UCLA Bruins ===
After exiting the Final Four of the 2025 NCAA tournament with a 85–51 loss in the semifinals to UConn, UCLA went undefeated in 2025–26 against all Big Ten opponents, winning the Big Ten regular season and conference tournament titles. It was their second consecutive Big Ten tournament championship. Senior center Lauren Betts earned first-team All-American honors for the second consecutive season, and she was named both the Big Ten Player of the Year and Defensive Player of the Year. Senior guard Kiki Rice was named a third-team All-American. The Bruins were also seeded No. 1 in the NCAA tournament, and they returned to the Final Four after their first under head coach Cori Close in 2025. UCLA reached the national championship game after a 51–44 win over Texas, who had handed them their only loss of the season. It was the Bruins' first national championship game in the NCAA era. They won a national championship in 1978, when the Association for Intercollegiate Athletics for Women was overseeing women's basketball, until the NCAA took over in 1982.

== Game summary ==
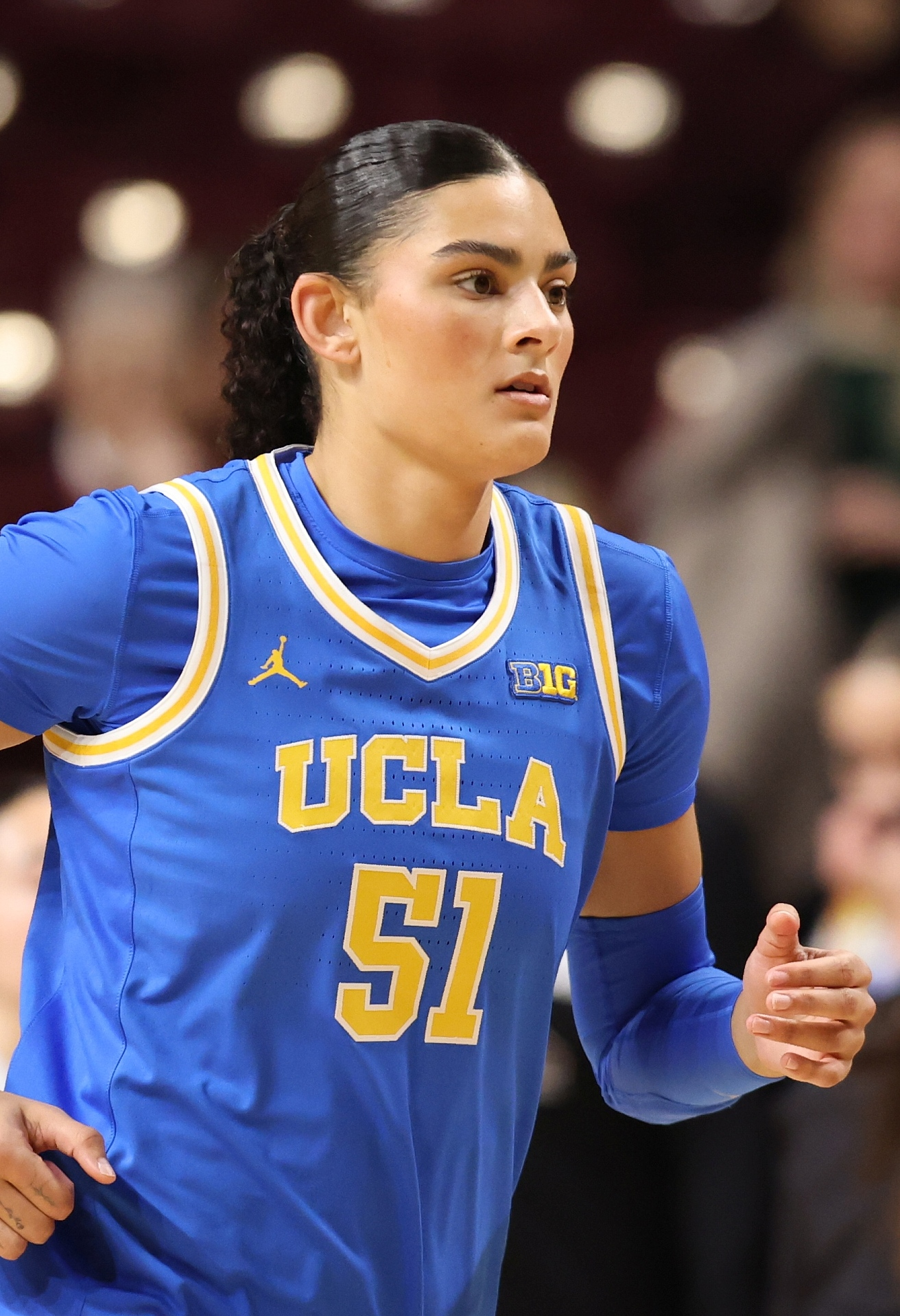
Lauren Betts was named the NCAA tournament Most Outstanding Player.

UCLA never trailed in the game and defeated South Carolina 79–51 for their 31st consecutive win. The 28-point margin was the third largest in a Division I women's championship game. The Bruins' Lauren Betts had 14 points and 11 rebounds and was named the tournament's Most Outstanding Player. Fellow senior teammate Gabriela Jaquez added a game-high 21 points, 10 rebounds and five assists. All five of UCLA's starters scored in double figures. The Gamecocks' 51 points was their season low.

The Bruins led 14–3 after five minutes while coaxing the Gamecocks' post players into settling for jump shots. UCLA's Kiki Rice made a buzzer-beating three-pointer to end the first quarter, giving them a 21–10 lead. South Carolina shot 17% for its worst quarter of the season, with their leading scorer, Joyce Edwards, going 0-for-3. The Bruins led 36–23 at halftime after holding the Gamecocks to 25.7% shooting for the half. UCLA opened the second half with a 12–3 burst, with Jacquez scoring five points. South Carolina was outscored 25–9 in the third quarter, as the Gamecocks scored the second-fewest points ever in one quarter of the championship game. The Bruins extended their lead to 61–32 after three quarters, the largest lead entering the fourth quarter in the history of the championship game.

Tessa Johnson led South Carolina in scoring with 14 points, and Agot Makeer added 11 points off the bench. It was the Gamecocks' second consecutive championship game loss after winning the title in 2024.

ABC

April 5, 2026
3:00 p.m. EDT

Report

No. 1 South Carolina 51, No. 1 UCLA 79
Scoring by quarter: 10–21, 13–15, 9–25, 19–18
Pts: T. Johnson (14); Rebs: Edwards (11); Asts: Edwards (3)	Pts: Jaquez (21); Rebs: L. Betts (11); Asts: Jaquez, Rice (5)

Mortgage Matchup Center, Phoenix, Arizona
Attendance: 15,856
Referees: Gina Cross, Tiffany Bird

Starters:			Pts	Reb	Ast
F	8	Joyce Edwards	8	11	3
C	11	Madina Okot	6	3	1
G	5	Tessa Johnson	14	3	1
G	00	Ta'Niya Latson	4	3	2
G	25	Raven Johnson	3	3	0
Reserves:					
F	31	Alicia Tournebize	0	6	0
F	30	Maryam Dauda	3	2	0
G	44	Agot Makeer	11	2	0
G	24	Ayla McDowell	0	0	2
G	1	Maddy McDaniel	2	0	2
Head coach:
Dawn Staley

South Carolina	UCLA

South Carolina	Statistics	UCLA
18/62 (29%)	Field goals	30/69 (43%)
2/15 (13%)	3-pt field goals	8/19 (42%)
13/17 (76%)	Free throws	11/13 (85%)
17	Offensive rebounds	21
20	Defensive rebounds	28
37	Total rebounds	49
9	Assists	23
14	Turnovers	13
6	Steals	7
4	Blocks	5
17	Fouls	17

Starters:			Pts	Reb	Ast
C	51 (Note: Betts changed jersey numbers from 51 to 26 temporarily during the third quarter as it had blood on it.)	Lauren Betts	14	11	2
G	8	Gianna Kneepkens	15	1	4
G	11	Gabriela Jaquez	21	10	5
G	5	Charlisse Leger-Walker	10	4	2
G	1	Kiki Rice	10	6	5
Reserves:					
F	16	Sienna Betts	0	4	0
F	33	Amanda Muse	0	1	0
F	32	Angela Dugalić	9	5	4
G	9	Lena Bilic	0	1	1
G	3	Christina Karamouzi	0	0	0
Head coach:
Cori Close

== Media coverage ==
The championship game was televised in the United States by ABC. Ryan Ruocco was the play-by-play commentator, Rebecca Lobo was the analyst, and Holly Rowe was the sideline reporter.

== See also ==
- 2026 NCAA Division I men's basketball championship game
