= 2025–26 UCLA Bruins women's basketball team =

UCLA Bruins Women's Basketball Intercollegiate basketball season 2025-26

2025–26 UCLA Bruins women's basketball

Big Ten regular season & tournament champions

NCAA tournament champions, W 79–51 vs. South Carolina
- Conference: Big Ten Conference

Ranking
- Coaches: No. 1
- AP: No. 1
- Record: 37–1 (18–0 Big Ten)
- Head coach: Cori Close (15th season)
- Associate head coach: Tony Newnan
- Assistant coaches: Tasha Brown; Soh Matsuura; James Clark; Michaela Onyenwere
- Home arena: Pauley Pavilion

2025–26 Big Ten women's basketball standings
	Conf.				Overall
Team	W		L	PCT	W		L	PCT
No. 1 UCLA †	18	–	0	1.000	37	–	1	.974
No. 7 Michigan	15	–	3	.833	28	–	7	.800
No. 16 Iowa	15	–	3	.833	27	–	7	.794
No. 17 Ohio State	13	–	5	.722	27	–	8	.771
No. 15 Minnesota	13	–	5	.722	24	–	9	.727
No. 20 Maryland	11	–	7	.611	24	–	9	.727
No. 22 Michigan State	11	–	7	.611	23	–	9	.719
No. 25 Washington	10	–	8	.556	22	–	11	.667
USC	9	–	9	.500	18	–	14	.563
Illinois	9	–	9	.500	22	–	12	.647
Oregon	8	–	10	.444	23	–	13	.639
Nebraska	7	–	11	.389	19	–	13	.594
Indiana	6	–	12	.333	18	–	14	.563
Purdue	5	–	13	.278	13	–	17	.433
Wisconsin	5	–	13	.278	16	–	18	.471
Penn State	4	–	14	.222	11	–	18	.379
Northwestern	2	–	16	.111	8	–	21	.276
Rutgers	1	–	17	.056	9	–	20	.310
† 2026 Big Ten tournament winner Rankings from AP poll

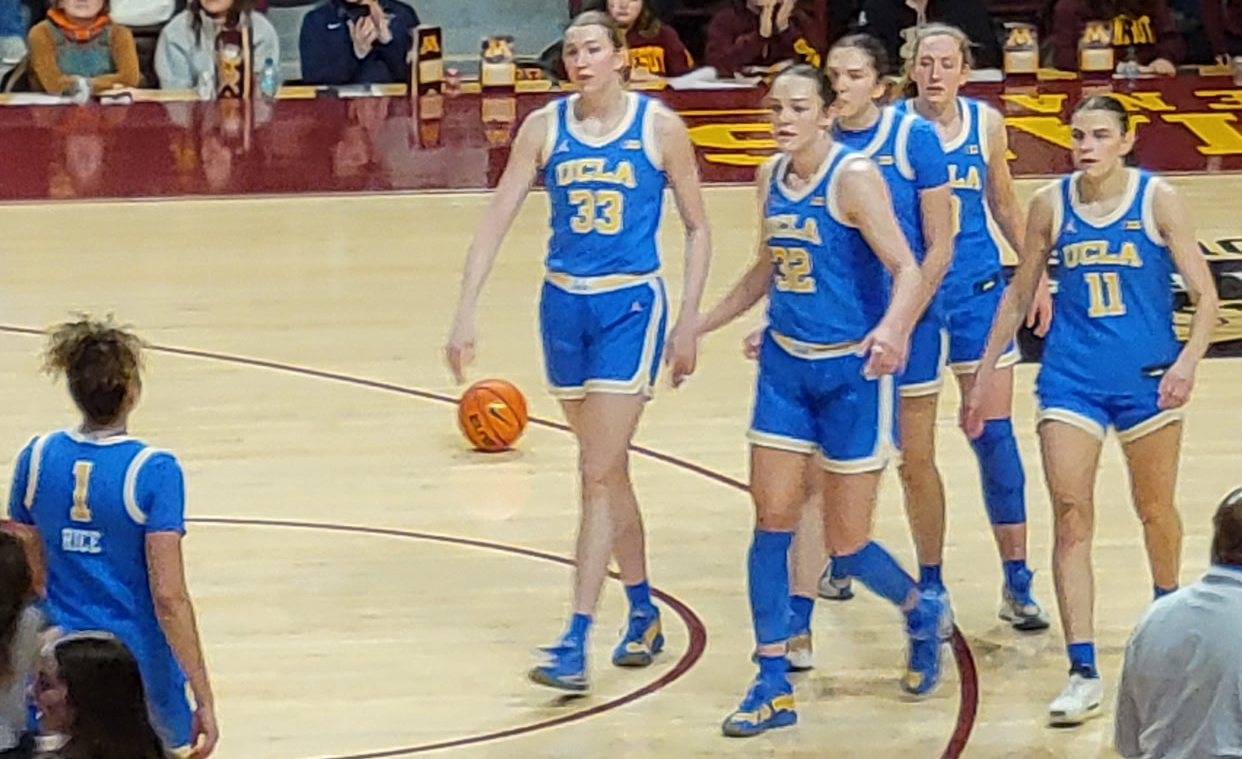
2025-26 UCLA Women's Basketball Team at Minnesota January 14, 2026

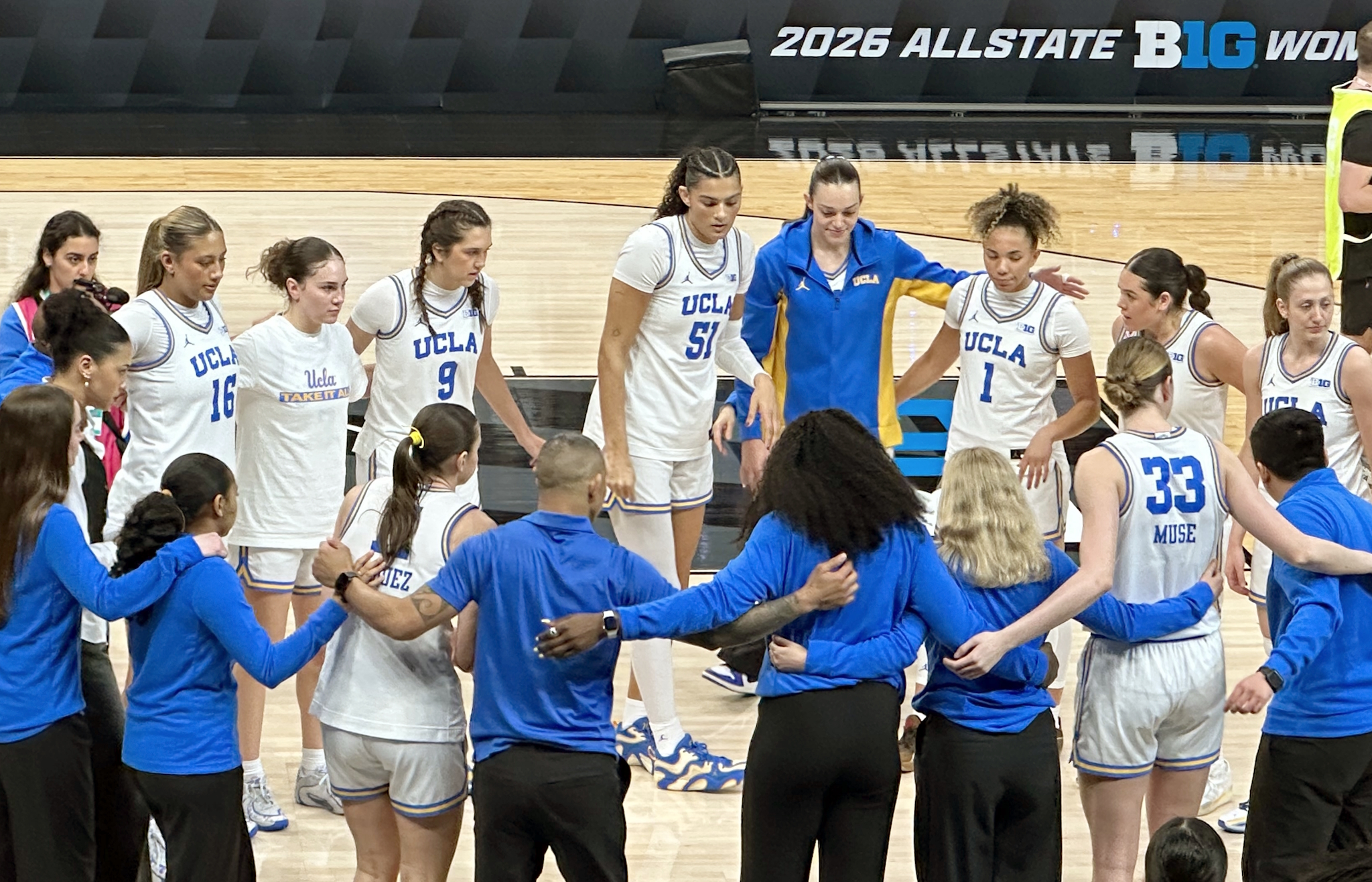
2025-26 UCLA Bruins Women's Basketball Team at the Big Ten Tournament Championship March 8, 2026

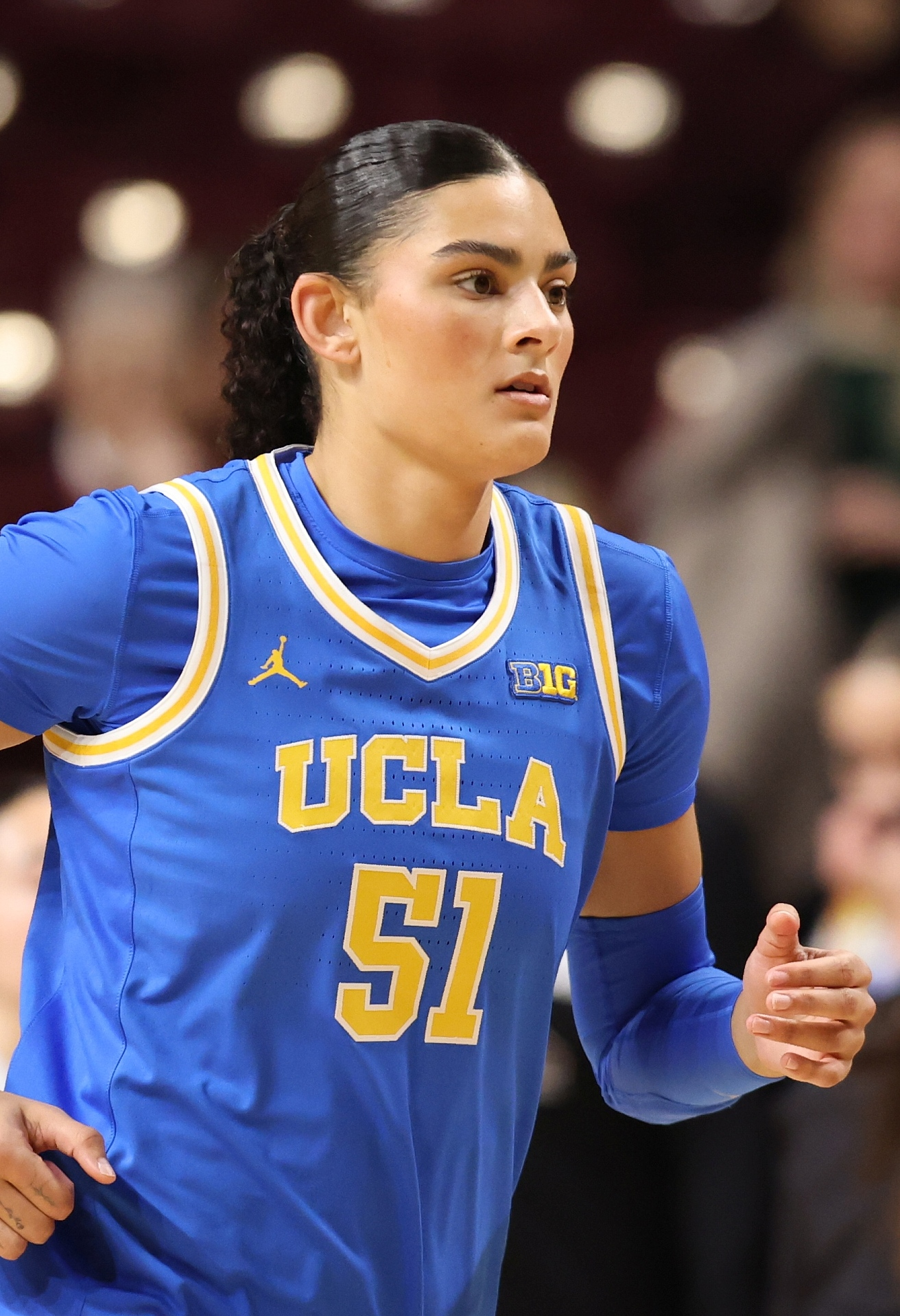
NCAA Championship tournament MOP Lauren Betts

The 2025–26 UCLA Bruins women's basketball team represented the University of California, Los Angeles during the 2025–26 NCAA Division I women's basketball season. The Bruins were led by head coach Cori Close in her fifteenth year, and played their home games at Pauley Pavilion. The Bruins went 37–1 and won the program's second women's basketball national championship, and the first basketball championship in the NCAA era.

In the preseason, the Bruins were voted the favorite to win the Big Ten conference, with senior center Lauren Betts named the 2025-26 Big Ten Preseason Player of the Year. Betts and senior guard Kiki Rice were named to the All-Big Ten preseason conference team. Laren Betts was named to the Associated Press Preseason All-America team.

In November 2025, the first month of the season, the Bruins faced ranked teams in Oklahoma, Texas, North Carolina, and Tennessee, going 3-1, and won their other games, to establish their ranking in the top 5. Past the mid-point of the conference schedule at the end of January 2026, the Bruins had defeated 10 conference teams, including four ranked teams, to solidify a number 2 national ranking. The entire starting lineup was projected to be taken in the first round of the WNBA draft. The Bruins clinched a share of the Big Ten conference title on February 19, 2026 by defeating Washington. The Bruins won the outright regular season Big Ten conference championship on February 22 against Wisconsin on Senior night. They finished the conference season undefeated on March 1, 2026 with a win at USC.

Starting the postseason seeded number 1 in the Big Ten tournament, the Bruins won all three games, concluding with a tournament record-setting win over number 8 ranked Iowa. For the NCAA tournament, the Bruins were the number 2 seed overall and number one in the Sacramento region. The Bruins needed a comeback in the second half against Duke to reach the final four. In the national semi-final game, the Bruins won the re-match with the Texas Longhorns, the one loss they experienced all season. In a dominating performance, UCLA defeated South Carolina 79-51 in the 2026 NCAA Division I women's basketball championship game. All six senior players were selected in the 2026 WNBA draft, five in the first round, setting a record.

== Previous season ==
The Bruins finished the 2024–25 season with a 34–3 record, including 16–2 in Big Ten play to finish in second place to USC. UCLA proceeded to beat USC in the 2025 Big Ten conference tournament to win the championship. They were ranked No. 1 in the polls for the first time in program history. They received the number 1 overall seed in the 2025 NCAA Tournament and reached their first NCAA Final Four game (Note: The UCLA Bruins women's basketball team has played in the semi-finals of the AIAW women's basketball tournament twice, winning the championship in 1978), where they were eliminated by the eventual national champion UConn. A documentary named You See LA produced by Fox Sports was broadcast on March 1, 2026 on FS1 immediately following the 2026 UCLA-USC women's basketball game. The episode includes footage from games and post-game locker room team meetings, team gatherings, and interviews.

== Offseason ==
In the offseason, the Bruins did not lose any players to graduation. Charlisse Leger-Walker entered the lineup following a 650-day recovery from an ACL injury she suffered while playing against the Bruins for Washington State before her transfer. The team was joined by Lauren Betts' younger sister Sienna, Gianna Kneepkens, who transferred from Utah, and Megan Grant, a member of the UCLA Softball team. New recruit Lena Bilić earned a medal at FIBA summer international play representing Croatia, while Sienna Betts and Gianna Kneepkens also earned medals for Team USA. The Bruins also signed Christina Karamouzi from Sweden. With six senior starters available, Angela Dugalić asked to come off the bench.

The entire highly ranked 2024–25 freshman recruiting class, along with Janiah Barker and Londynn Jones, entered the transfer portal within days following the end of the season. They wanted more playing time and larger roles within the team. Elina Aarnisalo, who transferred to North Carolina, would have played significant minutes. The Bruin team would play all six of the teams of the transfers during the season and defeat them.

Former player Michaela Onyenwere became part of the coaching staff of the 2025-26 team. Fourteen-year assistant coach Shannon LeBeauf departed to become the senior associate head coach for the Rutgers women's basketball team. Shannon's husband, Sean, also joined the Rutgers staff as Assistant Coach and Defensive Coordinator.

=== Departures ===
UCLA departures
Name	Num	Pos.	Height	Year	Hometown	Reason for Departure
Janiah Barker	0	F	6'4"	Junior	Marietta, GA	Transferred to Tennessee
Avary Cain	2	G	6'1"	Freshman	Santa Maria, CA	Transferred to Oregon
Londynn Jones	3	G	5'4"	Junior	Riverside, CA	Transferred to USC
Zania Socka-Ngumen	6	F	6'3"	Freshman	Silver Spring, MD	Transferred to Indiana
Elina Aarnisalo	7	G	5'10"	Freshman	Helsinki, Finland	Transferred to North Carolina
Kendall Dudley	22	F	6'2"	Freshman	Lewisville, TX	Transferred to Michigan

=== Additions ===
UCLA incoming transfers
Name	Position	Height	Year	Hometown	Previous school
Megan Grant	G/F	5'10"	Senior	San Mateo, CA	UCLA (softball)
Gianna Kneepkens	G	6'0"	Senior	Duluth, MN	Utah

=== Recruiting ===
The 2025 recruiting class of Sienna Betts and Lena Bilić was ranked twelfth in the nation by ESPN.

College recruiting
Name	Hometown	School	Height	Weight	Commit date
Sienna Betts; F	Centennial, CO	Grandview High School	6 ft 4 in (1.93 m)	N/A	November 13, 2024
Sienna Betts; F	Recruit ratings: ESPN: (98)				
Lena Bilić; G	Zagreb, Croatia	XVI Gimnazija	6 ft 3 in (1.91 m)	N/A	November 13, 2024
Lena Bilić; G	Recruit ratings: No ratings found				
Christina Karamouzi; G	Sweden		6 ft 0 in (1.83 m)	N/A	July 8, 2025
Christina Karamouzi; G	Recruit ratings: No ratings found				
Overall recruit ranking: ESPN: 12
Note: In many cases, Scout, Rivals, 247Sports, On3, and ESPN may conflict in their listings of height and weight.; In these cases, the average was taken. ESPN grades are on a 100-point scale.; Sources: "2025 Player Commits". ESPN. Archived from the original on July 13, 2025.

== Roster ==
2025–26 UCLA Bruins women's basketball team
Players
Coaches

Pos.	#	Name	Height	Year	Previous school	Hometown
G	1	Kiki Rice	5 ft 11 in (1.8 m)	Sr	Sidwell Friends	Bethesda, MD
G	3	Christina Karamouzi	6 ft 0 in (1.83 m)	Fr		Luleå, Sweden
G	5	Charlisse Leger-Walker	5 ft 10 in (1.78 m)	GS	St Peter's School, Cambridge; Washington State	Waikato, New Zealand
G	8	Gianna Kneepkens	6 ft 0 in (1.83 m)	Sr	Marshall School; Utah	Duluth, MN
G/F	9	Lena Bilić	6 ft 3 in (1.91 m)	Fr	XVI Gimnazija	Zagreb, Croatia
F	11	Gabriela Jaquez	6 ft 0 in (1.83 m)	Sr	Camarillo	Camarillo, CA
F	16	Sienna Betts	6 ft 4 in (1.93 m)	Fr	Grandview	Centennial, CO
F	30	Timea Gardiner (injured) (redshirt)	6 ft 3 in (1.91 m)	Sr	Fremont; Oregon State	Ogden, UT
F	32	Angela Dugalić	6 ft 4 in (1.93 m)	GS	Maine West; Oregon	Des Plaines, IL
F	33	Amanda Muse	6 ft 4 in (1.93 m)	RS So	Heritage	Brentwood, CA
G/F	43	Megan Grant	5 ft 10 in (1.78 m)	Sr	Aragon High School	San Mateo, CA
C	51	Lauren Betts	6 ft 7 in (2.01 m)	Sr	Grandview; Stanford	Centennial, CO

Head coach

- Cori Close (UC Santa Barbara)

Assistant coach(es)

- Tony Newnan (UC Santa Barbara)
- Tasha Brown (St. Ambrose)
- Soh Matsuura (UCLA)
- James Clark (La Salle)
- Michaela Onyenwere (UCLA)

Legend

- (C) Team captain
- (S) Suspended
- (I) Ineligible
- (W) Walk-on
- Injured
- Current redshirt

Roster

Seven of the team members had been named to the McDonald's All-American Game team before coming to UCLA: Lauren Betts, Sienna Betts, Angela Dugalić, Timea Gardiner, Gabriela Jaquez, Amanda Muse, and Kiki Rice. Rice, Jaquez, and Sienna Betts were game MVPs. Both Sienna Betts and Timea Gardiner were out with injuries in November. Gardiner elected to redshirt for the 2025-26 season. The roster and starting lineup proved to be the most senior-dependent in either men's or women's college basketball for the 2025-26 season.

== Schedule and results ==
Date time, TV	Rank^{#}	Opponent^{#}	Result	Record	High points	High rebounds	High assists	Site (attendance) city, state
Regular season
November 3, 2025*; 7:00 p.m., B1G+	No. 3	vs. San Diego State; Orange County Hoops Classic	W 77–53	1–0	21 – L. Betts	11 – Jaquez	5 – Tied	Honda Center; Anaheim, CA
November 6, 2025*; 11:30 a.m., B1G+	No. 3	UC Santa Barbara	W 87–50	2–0	21 – Jaquez	8 – Rice	7 – Leger-Walker	Pauley Pavilion (6,863); Los Angeles, CA
November 10, 2025*; 7:30 p.m., FS1	No. 3	vs. No. 6 Oklahoma	W 73–59	3–0	20 – Kneepkens	15 – Dugalic	6 – Rice	Golden 1 Center (1,463); Sacramento, CA
November 13, 2025*; 6:00 p.m., ESPN2	No. 3	vs. No. 11 North Carolina; WBCA Challenge	W 78–60	4–0	20 – L. Betts	10 – Tied	7 – L. Betts	Michelob Ultra Arena (1,588); Paradise, NV
November 15, 2025*; 6:00 p.m., ESPN+	No. 3	vs. South Florida; WBCA Challenge	W 94–61	5–0	17 – Jaquez	8 – L. Betts	7 – Leger-Walker	Michelob Ultra Arena (2,116); Paradise, NV
November 23, 2025*; 2:00 p.m., B1G+	No. 3	Southern	W 88–37	6–0	20 – Dugalic	8 – Tied	7 – Leger-Walker	Pauley Pavilion (3,712); Los Angeles, CA
November 26, 2025*; 11:00 a.m., TruTV	No. 3	vs. No. 4 Texas; Players Era Festival semifinals	L 65–76	6–1	17 – Tied	7 – L. Betts	3 – Tied	Michelob Ultra Arena; Paradise, NV
November 27, 2025*; 7:30 p.m., TruTV	No. 3	vs. Duke; Players Era Festival Consolation Game	W 89–59	7–1	23 – Jaquez	8 – Dugalic	6 – Tied	Michelob Ultra Arena; Paradise, NV
November 30, 2025*; 1:30 p.m., FS1	No. 3	No. 14 Tennessee	W 99–77	8–1	29 – Jaquez	11 – Rice	11 – Leger-Walker	Pauley Pavilion (5,639); Los Angeles, CA
December 7, 2025; 12:00 p.m., FS1	No. 4	Oregon	W 80–59	9–1 (1–0)	24 – L. Betts	14 – L. Betts	8 – Leger-Walker	Pauley Pavilion (3,889); Los Angeles, CA
December 16, 2025*; 7:00 p.m., BTN	No. 4	Cal Poly	W 115–28	10–1	23 – Rice	10 – L. Betts	7 – Leger-Walker	Pauley Pavilion (3,110); Los Angeles, CA
December 20, 2025*; 2:00 p.m., B1G+	No. 4	Long Beach State	W 106–44	11–1	17 – Tied	10 – Kneepkens	10 – Leger-Walker	Pauley Pavilion (3,428); Los Angeles, CA
December 28, 2025; 11:00 a.m., BTN	No. 4	at No. 19 Ohio State	W 82–75	12–1 (2–0)	18 – L. Betts	16 – L. Betts	4 – Tied	Value City Arena (8,455); Columbus, OH
December 31, 2025; 11:00 a.m., Peacock	No. 4	at Penn State	W 97–61	13–1 (3–0)	25 – L. Betts	7 – Tied	8 – Leger-Walker	Rec Hall (2,189); State College, PA
January 3, 2026; 5:00 p.m., Peacock	No. 4	No. 17 USC; Rivalry	W 80–46	14–1 (4–0)	18 – L. Betts	12 – L. Betts	8 – Rice	Pauley Pavilion (11,241); Los Angeles, CA
January 11, 2026; 4:00 p.m., BTN	No. 4	at No. 25 Nebraska	W 83–61	15–1 (5–0)	18 – L. Betts	10 – L. Betts	6 – Kneepkens	Pinnacle Bank Arena (6,110); Lincoln, NE
January 14, 2026; 5:00 p.m., B1G+	No. 3	at Minnesota	W 76–58	16–1 (6–0)	25 – Rice	10 – L. Betts	5 – Rice	Williams Arena (4,374); Minneapolis, MN
January 18, 2026; 1:00 p.m., NBC	No. 3	No. 12 Maryland	W 97–67	17–1 (7–0)	22 – Jaquez	8 – Dugalić	8 – Leger-Walker	Pauley Pavilion (8,721); Los Angeles, CA
January 21, 2026; 7:00 p.m., B1G+	No. 3	Purdue	W 96–48	18–1 (8–0)	25 – Jaquez	10 – Tied	5 – L. Betts	Pauley Pavilion (3,759); Los Angeles, CA
January 25, 2026; 1:00 p.m., BTN	No. 3	at Northwestern	W 80–46	19–1 (9–0)	19 – Jaquez	10 – Rice	8 – Rice	Welsh–Ryan Arena (2,894); Evanston, IL
January 28, 2026; 4:00 p.m., B1G+	No. 2	at Illinois	W 80–67	20–1 (10–0)	23 – L. Betts	9 – L. Betts	5 – Rice	State Farm Center (4,756); Champaign, IL
February 1, 2026; 1:00 p.m., FOX	No. 2	No. 8 Iowa	W 88–65	21–1 (11–0)	22 – Dugalic	7 – S. Betts	7 – Rice	Pauley Pavilion (6,917); Los Angeles, CA
February 4, 2026; 7:00 p.m., B1G+	No. 2	Rutgers	W 86–46	22–1 (12–0)	17 – Rice	7 – Tied	7 – Leger-Walker	Pauley Pavilion (2,895); Los Angeles, CA
February 8, 2026; 12:00 p.m., FOX	No. 2	at No. 8 Michigan	W 69–66	23–1 (13–0)	20 – Rice	16 – L. Betts	5 – L. Betts	Crisler Center (6,108); Ann Arbor, MI
February 11, 2026; 5:00 p.m., Peacock	No. 2	at No. 13 Michigan State	W 86–63	24–1 (14–0)	22 – L. Betts	7 – Tied	5 – Tied	Breslin Center (3,517); East Lansing, MI
February 15, 2026; 12:00 p.m., Peacock	No. 2	Indiana	W 92–48	25–1 (15–0)	17 – Rice	14 – L. Betts	3 – Tied	Pauley Pavilion (5,468); Los Angeles, CA
February 19, 2026; 7:00 p.m., BTN	No. 2	Washington	W 82–67	26–1 (16–0)	23 – L. Betts	8 – L. Betts	8 – Leger-Walker	Pauley Pavilion (3,421); Los Angeles, CA
February 22, 2026; 2:30 p.m., Peacock	No. 2	Wisconsin	W 80–60	27–1 (17–0)	19 – L. Betts	14 – L. Betts	7 – Leger-Walker	Pauley Pavilion (5,421); Los Angeles, CA
March 1, 2026; 3:00 p.m., FS1	No. 2	at USC; Rivalry	W 73–50	28–1 (18–0)	20 – Leger-Walker	15 – L. Betts	5 – Tied	Galen Center (8,841); Los Angeles, CA
Big Ten tournament
March 6, 2026; 9:00 a.m., BTN	(1) No. 2	vs. (8) Washington; Quarterfinals	W 78–60	29–1	26 – L. Betts	8 – L. Betts	6 – Rice	Gainbridge Fieldhouse (5,146); Indianapolis, IN
March 7, 2026; 11:00 a.m., BTN	(1) No. 2	vs. (5) No. 11 Ohio State; Semifinals	W 72–62	30–1	17 – Rice	9 – L. Betts	6 – Leger-Walker	Gainbridge Fieldhouse (6,387); Indianapolis, IN
March 8, 2026; 11:15 a.m., CBS	(1) No. 2	vs. (2) No. 9 Iowa; Championship	W 96–45	31–1	19 – Kneepkens	7 – Tied	8 – Rice	Gainbridge Fieldhouse (6,451); Indianapolis, IN
NCAA Tournament
March 21, 2026*; 7:00 p.m., ESPN	(1 S2) No. 2	(16 S2) Cal Baptist; First round	W 96–43	32–1	22 – L. Betts	12 – S. Betts	5 – Leger-Walker	Pauley Pavilion (7,250); Los Angeles, CA
March 23, 2026*; 7:00 p.m., ESPN	(1 S2) No. 2	(8 S2) Oklahoma State; Second round	W 87–68	33–1	35 – L. Betts	9 – L. Betts	5 – Leger-Walker	Pauley Pavilion (6,114); Los Angeles, CA
March 27, 2026*; 4:41 p.m., ESPN	(1 S2) No. 2	vs. (4 S2) No. 18 Minnesota; Sweet Sixteen	W 80–56	34–1	21 – Rice	10 – Dugalić	8 – Leger-Walker	Golden 1 Center (9,446); Sacramento, CA
March 29, 2026*; 12:00 p.m., ABC	(1 S2) No. 2	vs. (3 S2) No. 8 Duke; Elite Eight	W 70–58	35–1	23 – L. Betts	10 – L. Betts	6 – Leger-Walker	Golden 1 Center (9,627); Sacramento, CA
April 3, 2026*; 6:30 p.m., ESPN	(1 S2) No. 2	vs. (1 FW3) No. 3 Texas; Final Four	W 51–44	36–1	16 – L. Betts	11 – L. Betts	5 – Leger-Walker	Mortgage Matchup Center (15,856); Phoenix, AZ
April 5, 2026*; 12:30 p.m., ABC	(1 S2) No. 2	vs. (1 S4) No. 4 South Carolina; National Championship	W 79–51	37–1	21 – Jaquez	11 – L. Betts	5 – Tied	Mortgage Matchup Center (15,856); Phoenix, AZ
*Non-conference game. ^{#}Rankings from AP Poll. (#) Tournament seedings in parentheses. S2=Sacramento 2. FW3=Fort Worth 3. All times are in Pacific Time. Source:

== Game summaries ==
Sources: 2025-26 UCLA Bruins Women's basketball Schedule UCLA Athletic Communications Office Website at uclabruins.com

=== San Diego State (Orange County Hoops Classic) ===
BTN+

November 3, 2025
7:00 p.m. PST

San Diego State Aztecs 53, No. 3 UCLA Bruins 77
Scoring by quarter: 9–12, 13–25, 16–21, 15–19

Honda Center • Anaheim, California
Referees: Nicole Leon, Erica Parker, Charles Gonzalez

=== vs UC Santa Barbara ===
BTN+

November 6, 2025
11:30 a.m. PST

UC Santa Barbara Gauchos 53, No. 3 UCLA Bruins 77
Scoring by quarter: 9–13, 13–25, 16–21, 15–19

Pauley Pavilion • Los Angeles, California
Referees: Esther Hsu, Tessa Turner, Julie Krommenhoek

=== No. 6 Oklahoma ===
FS1

November 10, 2025
7:30 p.m. PST

No. 6 Oklahoma Sooners 50, No. 3 UCLA Bruins 87
Scoring by quarter: 17–21, 9–30, 17–23, 7–13

Golden 1 Center • Sacramento, California
Attendance: 6863
Referees: Felicia Grinter, Mike McConnell, Brenda Pantoja

=== No. 11 North Carolina (WBCA Challenge) ===
ESPN2

November 13, 2025
6:00 p.m. PST

No. 3 UCLA Bruins 78, No. 11 North Carolina Tar Heels 60
Scoring by quarter: 12–17, 23–17, 23–12, 20–14

Michelob Ultra Arena • Las Vegas, Nevada
Attendance: 1,588
Referees: Chuck Gonzalez, Maj Forsberg, Brenda Pantoja

=== South Florida (WBCA Challenge) ===
ESPN+

November 15, 2025
6:00 p.m. PST

South Florida Bulls 61, No. 3 UCLA Bruins 94
Scoring by quarter: 8–29, 24–26, 16–21, 13–18

Michelob Ultra Arena • Las Vegas, Nevada
Attendance: 2,116
Referees: Lisa Jones, Melissa Barlow, Angelica Suffren

=== vs Southern ===
BTN+

November 23, 2025
200 p.m. PST

Southern Lady Jaguars 37, No. 3 UCLA Bruins 88
Scoring by quarter: 9–22, 0–27, 12–23, 16–16

Pauley Pavilion • Los Angeles, California
Attendance: 3,712

=== Texas (Players Era Festival semifinals) ===
TNT/TruTv

November 25, 2025
11:00 a.m. PST

No. 3 UCLA Bruins 65, No. 4 Texas Longhorns 76
Scoring by quarter: 10–20, 15–25, 22–17, 18–14

Michelob Ultra Arena • Las Vegas, Nevada
Referees: Chuck Gonzalez, In'Fini Robinson and Kyle Bacon

=== Duke (Players Era Festival) ===
TNT/TruTv

November 27, 2025
7:30 p.m. PST

Duke Blue Devils 59, No. 3 UCLA Bruins 89
Scoring by quarter: 7–30, 18–13, 17–22, 17–24

Michelob Ultra Arena • Las Vegas, Nevada
Referees: Maj Forsberg, Lisa Jones and Saif Esho

=== vs Tennessee ===
FS1

November 30, 2025
1:30 p.m. PST

No. 14 Tennessee Lady Volunteers 77, No. 3 UCLA Bruins 99
Scoring by quarter: 21–26, 18–23, 17–27, 21–23

Pauley Pavilion • Los Angeles, California
Attendance: 5,639
Referees: Maj Forsberg, Gina Cross, Brenda Pantoja

=== vs Oregon ===
FS1

December 7, 2025
12:00 p.m. PST

Oregon Ducks 59, No. 4 UCLA Bruins 80

29

Scoring by quarter: 8–19, 18–30, 14–16, 19–15

Pauley Pavilion • Los Angeles, California
Attendance: 3,889
Referees: Doug Knight, Kenneth Nash, Michol Murray

=== vs Cal Poly ===
BTN

December 16, 2025
7:00 p.m. PST

Cal Poly Mustangs 28, No. 4 UCLA Bruins 115
Scoring by quarter: 13–25, 3–35, 5–31, 7–24

Pauley Pavilion • Los Angeles, California
Attendance: 3,110
Referees: Maj Forsberg, Roy Gulbeyan, Esther Hsu

=== vs Long Beach State ===
BTN+

December 20, 2025
2:00 p.m. PST

Long Beach State Beach 44, No. 4 UCLA Bruins 106
Scoring by quarter: 11–29, 12–28, 8–21, 13–28

Pauley Pavilion • Los Angeles, California
Attendance: 3,428
Referees: Kyle Bacon, Nicole Leon, Kenneth Nash

=== at Ohio State ===
BTN

December 28, 2025
11:00 a.m. PST

No. 4 UCLA Bruins 82, Ohio State Buckeyes 75
Scoring by quarter: 18–16, 21–17, 24–23, 19–19

Value City Arena • Columbus, Ohio
Attendance: 8,455
Referees: Brian Hall, Chuck Gonzalez, Maggie Tieman

=== at Penn State ===
Peacock

December 31, 2025
11:00 a.m. PST

No. 4 UCLA Bruins 97, Penn State Lady Lions 61
Scoring by quarter: 29–12, 17–11, 25–13, 26–25

Bryce Jordan Center • University Park, Pennsylvania
Attendance: 2,189
Referees: Bruce Morris, Natasha Camy, Roy Gulbeyan

=== vs USC (Rivalry) ===
Peacock

January 3, 2026
5:00 p.m. PST

USC Trojans 46, No. 4 UCLA Bruins 80
Scoring by quarter: 16–16, 12–27, 12–22, 6–15

Pauley Pavilion • Los Angeles, California
Attendance: 11,241
Referees: Michol Murray, In'Fini Robinson, Michael McConnell

=== at Nebraska ===
BTN

January 11, 2026
4:00 p.m. PST

No. 4 UCLA Bruins 83, Nebraska Cornhuskers 61
Scoring by quarter: 17–11, 20–14, 24–16, 22–20

Pinnacle Bank Arena • Lincoln, Nebraska
Attendance: 6,110
Referees: Felicia Grinter, Tiara Cruse, Kenneth Nash

=== at Minnesota ===
BTN+

January 14, 2026
5:00 p.m. PST

No. 3 UCLA Bruins 76, Minnesota Golden Gophers 58
Scoring by quarter: 17–9, 17–15, 17–15, 25–19

Williams Arena • Minneapolis, Minnesota
Attendance: 4,374
Referees: Maj Forsberg, Michael McConnell, Brad Maxey

=== vs Maryland ===
NBC

January 18, 2026
1:00 p.m. PST

Maryland Terrapins 67, No. 3 UCLA Bruins 97
Scoring by quarter: 17–25, 18–22, 12–26, 20–24

Pauley Pavilion • Los Angeles, California
Attendance: 8,721
Referees: Kevin Pethtel, Michol Murray, Lisa Jones

=== vs Purdue ===
BTN+

January 21, 2026
7:00 p.m. PST

Purdue Boilermakers 48, No. 3 UCLA Bruins 96
Scoring by quarter: 8–22, 12–24, 18–22, 10–28

Pauley Pavilion • Los Angeles, California
Attendance: 3,759
Referees: Kyle Bacon, Ashlee Goode, Corey Long

=== at Northwestern ===
BTN

January 25, 2026
1:00pm

No. 3 UCLA Bruins 80, Northwestern Wildcats 46
Scoring by quarter: 21–14, 25–8, 24–16, 10–8

Welsh Ryan Arena • Evanston, Illinois
Attendance: 2,894
Referees: Brian Hall, Chuck Gonzalez, Esther Hsu

=== at Illinois ===
BTN+

January 28, 2026
6:00 p.m.

No. 2 UCLA Bruins 80, Illinois Fighting Illini 67
Scoring by quarter: 23–16, 22–15, 11–18, 24–18

State Farm Center, Champaign, Illinois
Attendance: 4,756
Referees: Nykesha Thompson, Julie Krommenhoek, Angel Kent

=== vs Iowa ===
FOX

February 1, 2026
1:00 p.m.

No. 8 Iowa Hawkeyes 65, No. 2 UCLA Bruins 88
Scoring by quarter: 13–17, 15–22, 17–23, 20–26

Pauley Pavilion • Los Angeles, California
Attendance: 6,917
Referees: Gina Cross, Michol Murray, S. Brian Hall

=== vs Rutgers ===
B1G+

February 4, 2026
7:00 p.m.

Rutgers Scarlet Knights 46, No. 2 UCLA Bruins 86
Scoring by quarter: 6–26, 13–14, 8–28, 19–18

Pauley Pavilion • Los Angeles, California
Attendance: 2,895
Referees: Lisa Jones, Kelly Broomfield, Nicole Leon

=== at Michigan ===
FOX

February 8, 2026
12:00 p.m.

No. 2 UCLA Bruins 69, No. 8 Michigan Wolverines 66
Scoring by quarter: 13–17, 20–13, 21–15, 15–21

Crisler Center, Ann Arbor, Michigan
Attendance: 6,108
Referees: Michael McConnell, Gina Cross, Kimberly Hobbs

=== at Michigan State ===
Peacock

February 11, 2026
5:00 p.m.

No. 2 UCLA Bruins 86, No. 13 Michigan State Spartans 63
Scoring by quarter: 23–9, 21–11, 22–18, 20–25

Breslin Events Center, East Lansing, Michigan
Attendance: 3,517
Referees: Brenda Pantoja, Brian Hall, Maggie Tieman

=== vs Indiana ===
Peacock

February 15, 2026
12:00 p.m.

Indiana Hoosiers 48, No. 2 UCLA Bruins 92
Scoring by quarter: 10–17, 10–30, 14–29, 14–16

Pauley Pavilion, Los Angeles, CA
Attendance: 5,468
Referees: Esther Hsu, Angela Enlund, Chuck Gonzalez

=== vs Washington ===
BTN

February 19, 2026
7:00 p.m.

Washington Huskies 67, No. 2 UCLA Bruins 82
Scoring by quarter: 12–22, 17–20, 19–21, 19–19

Pauley Pavilion, Los Angeles, CA
Attendance: 3,421
Referees: Maj Forsberg, In'Fini Robinson, Julie Krommenhoek

=== vs Wisconsin (Senior Day) ===
Peacock

February 22, 2026
2:30 p.m.

Wisconsin Badgers 60, No. 2 UCLA Bruins 80
Scoring by quarter: 15–26, 14–15, 20–24, 11–15

Pauley Pavilion, Los Angeles, California
Attendance: 5,421
Referees: Kalei Enterline, Teresa Turner, Corey Long

=== at USC (Rivalry) ===
FS1

March 1, 2026
3:00 p.m.

No. 2 UCLA Bruins 73, USC Trojans 50
Scoring by quarter: 19–11, 19–9, 19–16, 16–14

Galen Center, Los Angeles, California
Attendance: 8,841
Referees: Brenda Pantoja, Maj Forsberg, Julie Krommenhoek

=== vs Washington (Big Ten tournament) ===
BTN

March 6, 2026
9:00 a.m.

Washington Huskies 60, No. 2 UCLA Bruins 78
Scoring by quarter: 15–6, 9–21, 17–22, 19–29

Gainbridge Fieldhouse, Indianapolis, IN
Attendance: 5,146
Referees: Julie Krommenhoek, Nykesha Thompson, Tim Daley

=== vs Ohio State (Big Ten tournament) ===
BTN

March 7, 2026
11:00 a.m.

No. 11 Ohio State Buckeys 62, No. 2 UCLA Bruins 72
Scoring by quarter: 10–14, 11–18, 19–20, 22–20

Gainbridge Fieldhouse, Indianapolis, IN
Attendance: 6,387
Referees: Felicia Grinter, Maj Forsberg, Julie Krommenhoek

=== vs Iowa (Big Ten Championship) ===
CBS

March 8, 2026
2:15 p.m.

No. 8 Iowa 46, No. 1 UCLA 95
Scoring by quarter: 5–22, 15–20, 16–25, 9–29
Pts: Ava Heiden (15); Rebs: Tied (4); Asts: Chazadi Wright (5)	Pts: Gianna Kneepkens (19); Rebs: Tied (7); Asts: Kiki Rice (8)

Gainbridge Fieldhouse
Indianapolis, IN
Attendance: 6,451
Referees: Gina Cross, Brenda Pantoja, Lisa Jones

=== vs Cal Baptist (NCAA Tournament Round 1) ===
ESPN

March 21, 2026
7:00 p.m.

No. 16 (S2) Cal Baptist 43, No. 1 (S2) UCLA 96
Scoring by quarter: 15–23, 19–21, 4–31, 5–21

Pauley Pavilion • Los Angeles, California
Attendance: 7,250
Referees: Brad Schmidt, Sean Martin, Julie Krommenhoek

=== vs Oklahoma St. (NCAA Tournament Round 2) ===
ESPN

March 23, 2026
7:00 p.m.

No. 8 (S2) Oklahoma State vs. No. 1 (S2) UCLA
Scoring by quarter: 6–21, 20–25, 21–18, 21–23

Pauley Pavilion • Los Angeles, California
Attendance: 6,114
Referees: Michael McConnell, Julie Krommenhoek, Sean Martin

=== vs Minnesota (NCAA Tournament Sweet 16) ===
ESPN

March 27, 2026
4:41 p.m.

No. 4 (S2) Minnesota 56, No. 1 (S2) UCLA 80
Scoring by quarter: 10–18, 19–16, 15–19, 12–27

Golden 1 Center • Sacramento, California
Attendance: 9,446
Referees: Lisa Jones, Maggie Tieman, Timothy Daley

=== vs Duke (NCAA Tournament Elite Eight) ===
ABC

March 29, 2026
12:00 p.m.

(3 S2) No. 8 Duke 58, (1 S2) No. 2 UCLA 70
Scoring by quarter: 21–17, 18–14, 8–20, 11–19

Golden 1 Center • Sacramento, California
Attendance: 9,627
Referees: Tiffany Bird, Natasha Camy, timothy Greene

=== vs Texas (NCAA Tournament Final Four) ===
ESPN

April 3, 2026
6:30 p.m.

(1 FW3) No. 3 Texas 44, (1 S2) No. 2 UCLA 51
Scoring by quarter: 6–14, 11–6, 11–11, 16–20

Mortgage Matchup Center•Phoenix, Arizona
Attendance: 15,856
Referees: Melissa Barlow, Felicia Grinter, Kyle Bacon

=== vs South Carolina (NCAA Championship) ===
ABC

April 5, 2026
12:30 p.m.

(1 S4) No. 4 South Carolina 51, (1 S2) No. 2 UCLA 79
Scoring by quarter: 10–21, 13–15, 9–25, 19–18
Pts: T. Johnson (14); Rebs: Edwards (11); Asts: Edwards (3)	Pts: Jaquez (21); Rebs: L. Betts (11); Asts: Jaquez, Rice (5)

Mortgage Matchup Center, Phoenix, Arizona
Attendance: 15,856
Referees: Gina Cross, Tiffany Bird

== Rankings ==
Ranking movements Legend: ██ Increase in ranking ██ Decrease in ranking ( ) = First-place votes
	Week																				
Poll	Pre	1	2	3	4	5	6	7	8	9	10	11	12	13	14	15	16	17	18	19	Final
AP	3	3	3 (1)	3 (1)	4	4	4	4	4*	4	3	3	2	2	2	2	2	2	2 (3)	2 (3)	1 (31)
Coaches	4	4	3	3	4	4	4	4	4	4	3	3	2	2	2	2	2	2	2 (1)	2 (1)	1 (31)

*AP did not release a week 8 poll.

== Awards and honors ==
- November 18, 2025 – UCLA was the U.S. Basketball Writers Association Team of the Week
- December 1, 2025 – Gabriela Jaquez was named Big Ten Conference Player of the Week
- December 8, 2025 – Lauren Betts was named Big Ten Conference Player of the Week
- December 9, 2025 – Lauren Betts was named AP Player of the Week
- January 5, 2026 – Lauren Betts was named Big Ten Conference Player of the Week
- February 6, 2026 - Four Bruins were named to the Mid-Season Top 10 lists for the Naismith Basketball Hall of Fame and WBCA Starting 5 awards: Kiki Rice (Nancy Lieberman Award), Gianna Kneepkens (Ann Meyers Drysdale Award), Gabriela Jaquez (Cheryl Miller Award), and Lauren Betts (Lisa Leslie Award).
- February 9, 2026 – Kiki Rice was named the Big Ten Conference Co-player of the Week
- March 1, 2026 – The team won the 2025-26 Big Ten conference regular season with an 18-0 record, and a Number 1 seed in the 2026 Big Ten women's basketball tournament. This is the first undefeated conference season for the Bruins since they began play in the NCAA and first in the Big Ten conference since the 2014–15 Maryland Terrapins women's basketball team. The Bruins are only the fourth team in the Big Ten to do so following the Terrapins, The 1984-85 Ohio State Buckeyes and the 1998-99 Purdue Boilermakers.
- March 3, 2026 – Big Ten Post Season honors were selected separately by coaches and media
  - Cori Close was named Big Ten Coach of the Year (coaches and media)
  - Lauren Betts was named Big Ten Conference Women's Basketball Player of the Year and Defensive Player of the Year (coaches and media, and the first time in conference history a player was honored with both)
  - Angela Dugalić was named Big Ten Conference Sixth Player of the Year (coaches and media)
  - Lauren Betts and Kiki Rice were named to the media and coaches All-Big Ten First Team (coaches and media)
  - Gabriela Jaquez and Gianna Kneepkens were named to the media All-Big Ten Second Team, with Gabriela also named to the coaches All-Big Ten Second team
  - Sienna Betts was named to the All-Big Ten Freshman team
- March 5, 2026 – Lauren Betts was named to the Athletic All-America first team
- March 8, 2026 – The Bruins won the 2026 Big Ten women's basketball tournament This gave them an automatic bid to the 2026 NCAA Division I women's basketball tournament in which the Bruins were selected the number 2 seed overall and number one in the Sacramento region.
  - Kiki Rice was named the Big Ten Conference tournament Most Outstanding Player
  - Kiki Rice and Lauren Betts were named to the Big Ten All–Tournament team
  - New tournament records were set in the championship game by the UCLA Bruins in the victory over the Iowa Hawkeyes, including the largest margin of victory in a Big Ten Tournament Final, the highest shooting percentage by a team in any Big Ten Tournament game, the most assists in any Big Ten Tournament game with 34, and tying the record for most steals in the Big Ten Tournament Championship Game with 15.
  - The 51 point margin of victory over number 8 ranked Iowa is the highest of any team over a top ten team in the NCAA era.
- March 11, 2026 – Lauren Betts was named both the ESPN 2026 All-American first team and the USA Today All-America first team
- March 16, 2026 – Lauren Betts was named to The Sporting News All-America first team.
- March 17, 2026 – Lauren Betts was named to the USBWA All-America first team. Kiki Rice was named to the USWBA All-America third team.
- March 18, 2026 – Lauren Betts was named to the AP All-America first team. Kiki Rice was named to the AP All-America third team. Gianna Kneepkens was an AP All-America honorable mention.
- March 29, 2026 – Lauren Betts was Most Outstanding Player of the Sacramento 2 regional, and was named to the regional all-tournament team along with Angela Dugalić following the win over Duke to reach the Final Four.
- April 2, 2026 – Lauren Betts was named to the list of 2026 WBCA NCAA Division I Coaches’ All-Americans Kiki Rice was named a WBCA honorable mention.
- April 4, 2026 – Lauren Betts was named the Lisa Leslie Award winner for the second time
- April 5, 2026 – The Bruins won the 2026 NCAA Division I women's basketball championship game. Lauren Betts was voted the Most Outstanding Player of the NCAA Championship tournament. Gabriela Jaquez and Kiki Rice were named to the Final Four all-tournament team.
- April 5, 2026 – Lauren Betts and Kiki Rice were named Sports Illustrated All-Americans, first and second team respectively
- April 5, 2026 - The 2025-26 team set school records for season wins (37), conference wins (18), most points scored in a season (3,187), field goal made (1,226), three-point field goals made (272), free throw percentage (.781), rebounds (1,611), and assists (834).
- April 6, 2026 - The UCLA Bruins were ranked number one in the final season Associated Press women's basketball poll, the first time in school history. They were also ranked number one in the final season USA Today Coaches poll. Both were unanimous.
- April 28, 2026 – Lauren Betts was named the 2026 Honda Sports Award Winner for basketball, the second Bruin to win the award after Ann Meyers-Drysdale in 1978.
- July 8, 2026 - Lauren Betts was named the Big Ten Female Athlete of the Year.
- July 15, 2026 - Lauren Betts won the Best Female College Athlete ESPY Award at the 2026 ESPY Awards.
- July 27, 2026 - Lauren Betts was awarded the Honda-Broderick Cup.
- November 15, 2026 - The team was honored before a home game with a new banner in Pauley Pavilion and presentation of championship rings.

== Team players drafted in the WNBA ==
Year	Round	Pick	Player	NBA Team
2026	1	4	Lauren Betts	Washington Mystics
2026	1	5	Gabriela Jaquez	Chicago Sky
2026	1	6	Kiki Rice	Toronto Tempo
2026	1	9	Angela Dugalić	Washington Mystics
2026	1	15	Gianna Kneepkens	Connecticut Sun
2026	2	18	Charlisse Leger-Walker	Connecticut Sun
