= 2025–26 Big Ten Conference women's basketball season =

- League: NCAA Division I
- Sport: Basketball
- Teams: 18
- TV partner(s): Big Ten Network, Fox, FS1, Peacock

2025–26 NCAA Division I women's basketball season
- Regular season champions: UCLA
- Season MVP: Lauren Betts
- Top scorer: Jaloni Cambridge

Tournament
- Champions: UCLA
- Runners-up: Iowa
- Finals MVP: Lauren Betts

Basketball seasons
- 2024–25 2026–27

2025–26 Big Ten women's basketball standings
	Conf.				Overall
Team	W		L	PCT	W		L	PCT
No. 1 UCLA †	18	–	0	1.000	37	–	1	.974
No. 7 Michigan	15	–	3	.833	28	–	7	.800
No. 16 Iowa	15	–	3	.833	27	–	7	.794
No. 17 Ohio State	13	–	5	.722	27	–	8	.771
No. 15 Minnesota	13	–	5	.722	24	–	9	.727
No. 20 Maryland	11	–	7	.611	24	–	9	.727
No. 22 Michigan State	11	–	7	.611	23	–	9	.719
No. 25 Washington	10	–	8	.556	22	–	11	.667
USC	9	–	9	.500	18	–	14	.563
Illinois	9	–	9	.500	22	–	12	.647
Oregon	8	–	10	.444	23	–	13	.639
Nebraska	7	–	11	.389	19	–	13	.594
Indiana	6	–	12	.333	18	–	14	.563
Purdue	5	–	13	.278	13	–	17	.433
Wisconsin	5	–	13	.278	16	–	18	.471
Penn State	4	–	14	.222	11	–	18	.379
Northwestern	2	–	16	.111	8	–	21	.276
Rutgers	1	–	17	.056	9	–	20	.310
† 2026 Big Ten tournament winner Rankings from AP poll

The 2025–26 Big Ten women's basketball season began with practices in October 2025, followed by the start of the 2025–26 NCAA Division I women's basketball season in November 2025. The regular season ended in March of 2026. The UCLA Bruins won the regular season with an 18-0 record, and a Number 1 seed in the 2026 Big Ten women's basketball tournament, which they also won. This is the first undefeated conference season for the Bruins since they began play in the NCAA and first in the Big Ten conference since the 2014–15 Maryland Terrapins women's basketball team.

The season was the conference's second with 18 teams. The conference announced that all teams will play 18 regular season conference games with each school playing one school both home and away, while facing 16 teams once. This is the first undefeated conference season for the Bruins since they began play in the NCAA and first in the Big Ten conference since the 2014–15 Maryland Terrapins women's basketball team. However, only 15 of the 18 teams qualified for the Big Ten tournament. Following the completion of the regular season, the tournament bracket was announced on March 1, 2026. The top four seeds were UCLA, Iowa, Michigan, and Minnesota. Penn State, Northwestern, and Rutgers did not participate as the lowest three teams in the standings.

For the second year in a row, a record-tying twelve Big Ten teams were invited to the 2026 NCAA Division I women's basketball tournament: UCLA, Iowa, Michigan, Ohio State, Minnesota, Maryland, Michigan State, Washington, Illinois, Oregon, USC, and Nebraska. Five teams hosted first round games. Wisconsin was invited to the 2026 Women's Basketball Invitation Tournament. The 2025-26 UCLA Bruins finished the season 37-1 and won the program's second women's basketball national championship, and the first basketball championship in the NCAA era. It was the first title for a Big Ten team since the 1998-99 Purdue Boilermakers women's basketball team.

== Head coaches ==
=== Coaching changes ===
==== Wisconsin ====
On March 9, 2025, Marisa Moseley resigned as head coach at Wisconsin after four years. On March 25, 2025, former Missouri head coach Robin Pingeton was named Moseley's successor.

=== Coaches ===
Team	Head coach	Previous job	Years at school	Overall record	Big Ten record	Big Ten titles	Big Ten Tournament titles	NCAA Tournaments	NCAA Final Fours	NCAA Championships
Illinois	Shauna Green	Dayton	4	63–35	30–24	0	0	2	0	0
Indiana	Teri Moren	Indiana State	12	246–112	124–68	1	0	7	0	0
Iowa	Jan Jensen	Iowa (Assoc.)	2	23–11	10–8	0	0	1	0	0
Maryland	Brenda Frese	Minnesota	24	607–169	159–34*	6	5	21	3	1
Michigan	Kim Barnes Arico	St. John's (Asst.)	14	284–144	129–91	0	0	8	0	0
Michigan State	Robyn Fralick	Bowling Green	3	44–19	23–13	0	0	2	0	0
Minnesota	Dawn Plitzuweit	West Virginia	3	45–27	13–23	0	0	0	0	0
Nebraska	Amy Williams	South Dakota	10	158–123	79–80	0	0	4	0	0
Northwestern	Joe McKeown	George Washington	18	268–258	110–182	0	0	2	0	0
Ohio State	Kevin McGuff	Washington	13	224–109	116–62	4	1	8	0	0
Oregon	Kelly Graves	Gonzaga	12	241–123	10–8	0	0	6	0	0
Penn State	Carolyn Kieger	Marquette	5	73–105	26–83	0	0	0	0	0
Purdue	Katie Gearlds	Marian	5	61–64	24–47	0	0	1	0	0
Rutgers	Coquese Washington	Notre Dame (Assoc.)	4	31–63	10–44	0	0	0	0	0
UCLA	Cori Close	Florida State (Assoc.)	15	321–143	16–2	0	1	9	1	0
USC	Lindsay Gottlieb	Cleveland Cavaliers (Asst.)	5	93–35	17–1	1	0	3	0	0
Washington	Tina Langley	Rice	5	61–60	9–9	0	0	0	0	0
Wisconsin	Robin Pingeton	Missouri	1	0–0	0–0	0	0	0	0	0

Notes:

- All records, appearances, titles, etc. are from time with current school only.
- Year at school includes 2025–26 season.
- Overall and Big Ten records are from time at current school and are through the beginning of the season.
- Frese's ACC conference record excluded since Maryland began Big Ten Conference play in 2014–15.

== Preseason ==
=== Preseason Big Ten poll ===
Prior to the conference's annual media day, conference standings were projected by a panel of writers.

Rank	Team
1	UCLA
2	Maryland
3	Michigan
4	USC
5	Ohio State

=== Preseason All-Big Ten ===
A select media panel named a preseason All-Big Ten team and player of the year.

Honor	Recipient
Preseason Player of the Year	Lauren Betts, UCLA
Preseason All-Big Ten Team
Preseason All-Big Ten Team	Hannah Stuelke, Iowa
Preseason All-Big Ten Team	Yarden Garzon, Maryland
Preseason All-Big Ten Team	Kaylene Smikle, Maryland
Preseason All-Big Ten Team	Olivia Olson, Michigan
Preseason All-Big Ten Team	Syla Swords, Michigan
Preseason All-Big Ten Team	Grace VanSlooten, Michigan State
Preseason All-Big Ten Team	Jaloni Cambridge, Ohio State
Preseason All-Big Ten Team	Lauren Betts, UCLA
Preseason All-Big Ten Team	Kiki Rice, UCLA
Preseason All-Big Ten Team	JuJu Watkins, USC
Preseason All-Big Ten Team	Sayvia Sellers, Washington

== Regular season ==
=== Record against ranked non-conference opponents ===
This will be a list of games against ranked opponents only (rankings from the AP Poll):
Big Ten Conference teams in bold

Date	Visitor	Home	Site	Score	CR	Ref
November 9, 2025	No. 18 **USC**	No. 9 NC State †	Spectrum Center ● Charlotte, NC	**W 69**–68	1–0	
November 10, 2025	No. 6 Oklahoma	No. 3 **UCLA** †	Golden 1 Center ● Sacramento, CA	**W 73**–59	2–0	
November 13, 2025	No. 11 North Carolina	No. 3 **UCLA** †	Michelob Ultra Arena ● Paradise, NV	**W 78**–60	3–0	
November 15, 2025	No. 14 **Michigan**	No. 18 Notre Dame †	Wayne State Fieldhouse ● Detroit, MI	**W 93**–54	4–0	
November 15, 2025	No. 2 South Carolina	No. 8 **USC** †	Crypto.com Arena ● Los Angeles, CA	**L 52**–69	4–1	
November 16, 2025	**Ohio State**	No. 1 UConn	PeoplesBank Arena ● Hartford, CT	**L 68**–100	4–2	
November 18, 2025	**Purdue**	No. 20 Kentucky	Memorial Coliseum ● Lexington, KY	**L 35**–76	4–3	
November 20, 2025	No. 21 **Iowa**	No. 7 Baylor †	State Farm Field House ● Bay Lake, FL	**W 57**–52	5–3	
November 21, 2025	No. 11 **USC**	No. 24 Notre Dame	Joyce Center ● Notre Dame, IN	**L 59**–61	5–4	
November 21, 2025	No. 6 **Michigan**	No. 1 UConn †	Mohegan Sun Arena ● Uncasville, CT	**L 69**–72	5–5	
November 26, 2025	No. 3 **UCLA**	No. 4 Texas †	Michelob Ultra Arena ● Paradise, NV	**L 65**–76	5–6	
November 26, 2025	No. 21 West Virginia	**Ohio State** †	Baha Mar Convention Center ● Nassau, Bahamas	**W 83**–81	6–6	
November 26, 2025	No. 16 Kentucky	No. 7 **Maryland** †	Roberto Clemente Coliseum ● San Juan, PR	**W 74**–66	7–6	
November 28, 2025	**Wisconsin**	No. 13 Ole Miss †	Ocean Center ● Daytona Beach, FL	**L 56**–65	7–7	
November 30, 2025	**Indiana**	No. 10 Iowa State †	Alico Arena ● Fort Myers, FL	**L 95**–106	7–8	
November 30, 2025	No. 14 Tennessee	No. 3 **UCLA**	Pauley Pavilion ● Los Angeles, CA	**W 99**–77	8–8	
December 10, 2025	No. 11 **Iowa**	No. 10 Iowa State	Hilton Coliseum ● Ames, IA	**L 69**–74	8–9	
December 13, 2025	No. 1 UConn	No. 16 **USC**	Galen Center ● Los Angeles, CA	**L 51**–79	8–10	
December 14, 2025	**Penn State**	No. 3 South Carolina	Colonial Life Arena ● Columbia, SC	**L 55**–95	8–11	
December 20, 2025	No. 11 **Iowa**	No. 1 UConn †	Barclays Center ● Brooklyn, NY	**L 64**–90	8–12	
December 22, 2025	No. 24 **Michigan State**	No. 15 Ole Miss †	Harrah's Cherokee ● Cherokee, NC	**W 66**–49	9–12	
January 19, 2026	No. 9 TCU	No. 12 **Ohio State** †	Prudential Center ● Newark, NJ	**W 71**–69	10–12	
January 19, 2026	No. 7 **Michigan**	No. 5 Vanderbilt †	Prudential Center ● Newark, NJ	**L 69**–72	10–13	

Team rankings are reflective of AP poll

† denotes game was played at neutral site
^ denotes NCAA tournament game

== Awards and honors ==
=== Players of the Week ===
Throughout the conference regular season, Big Ten Conference offices named two players (Player and Freshman) of the week each Monday.

Week	Player of the week	Freshman of the week
November 10, 2025	Shay Ciezki, Indiana	Hila Karsh, Purdue; Jazzy Davidson, USC
November 17, 2025	Sayvia Sellers, Washington	Addi Mack, Maryland
November 24, 2025	Ava Heiden, Iowa	Destiny Jackson, Illinois
December 1, 2025	Gabriela Jaquez, UCLA	Jazzy Davidson, USC
December 8, 2025	Lauren Betts, UCLA	Cearah Parchment, Illinois
December 15, 2025	Shay Ciezki, Indiana	Maya Makalusky, Indiana
December 22, 2025	Yarden Garzon, Maryland	Jazzy Davidson, USC
January 5, 2026	Lauren Betts, UCLA	Cearah Parchment, Illinois
January 12, 2026	Jaloni Cambridge, Ohio State	Kylee Kitts, Ohio State
January 19, 2026	Hannah Stuelke, Iowa	Addie Deal, Iowa
January 26, 2026	Ava Heiden, Iowa	Addie Deal, Iowa; Cearah Parchment, Illinois
February 2, 2026	Ehis Etute, Oregon; Kara Dunn, USC	Jazzy Davidson, USC
February 9, 2026	Shay Ciezki, Indiana; Kiki Rice, UCLA	Jazzy Davidson, USC
February 16, 2026	Oliva Olson, Michigan	Jazzy Davidson, USC
February 23, 2026	Ava Heiden, Iowa	Cearah Parchment, Illinois; Jazzy Davidson, USC
March 2, 2026	Olivia Olson, Michigan	Maya Makalusky, Indiana

=== All-Big Ten awards and teams ===
On March 3, 2026, the Big Ten announced its conference awards.

Honor	Coaches	Media
Player of the Year	Lauren Betts, UCLA	Lauren Betts, UCLA
Coach of the Year	Cori Close, UCLA	Cori Close, UCLA
Freshman of the Year	Jazzy Davidson, USC	Jazzy Davidson, USC
Defensive Player of the Year	Lauren Betts, UCLA	Lauren Betts, UCLA
Sixth Player of the Year	Angela Dugalić, UCLA	Angela Dugalić, UCLA
All-Big Ten First Team	Lauren Betts, UCLA	Lauren Betts, UCLA
All-Big Ten First Team	Jaloni Cambridge, Ohio State	Jaloni Cambridge, Ohio State
All-Big Ten First Team	Jazzy Davidson, USC	Shay Ciezki, Indiana
All-Big Ten First Team	Ava Heiden, Iowa	Jazzy Davidson, USC
All-Big Ten First Team	Oluchi Okananwa, Maryland	Ava Heiden, Iowa
All-Big Ten First Team	Olivia Olson, Michigan	Oluchi Okananwa, Maryland
All-Big Ten First Team	Kiki Rice, UCLA	Olivia Olson, Michigan
All-Big Ten First Team	Sayvia Sellers, Washington	Britt Prince, Nebraska
All-Big Ten First Team	Syla Swords, Michigan	Kiki Rice, UCLA
All-Big Ten First Team	Berry Wallace, Illinois	Syla Swords, Michigan
All-Big Ten Second Team	Kennedy Blair, Michigan State	Kennedy Blair, Michigan State
All-Big Ten Second Team	Shay Ciezki, Indiana	Grace Grocholski, Minnesota
All-Big Ten Second Team	Kara Dunn, USC	Gabriela Jaquez, UCLA
All-Big Ten Second Team	Katie Fiso, Oregon	Gianna Kneepkens, UCLA
All-Big Ten Second Team	Grace Grocholski, Minnesota	Kiyomi McMiller, Penn State
All-Big Ten Second Team	Gabriela Jaquez, UCLA	Sayvia Sellers, Washington
All-Big Ten Second Team	Tori McKinney, Minnesota	Hannah Stuelke, Iowa
All-Big Ten Second Team	Britt Prince, Nebraska	Grace Sullivan, Northwestern
All-Big Ten Second Team	Hannah Stuelke, Iowa	Grace VanSlooten, Michigan State
All-Big Ten Second Team	Grace VanSlooten, Michigan State	Berry Wallace, Illinois
All-Big Ten Third Team	Amaya Battle, Minnesota	Amaya Battle, Minnesota
All-Big Ten Third Team	Yarden Garzon, Maryland	Kara Dunn, USC
All-Big Ten Third Team	Kiyomi McMiller, Penn State	Katie Fiso, Oregon
All-Big Ten Third Team	Grace Sullivan, Northwestern	Tori McKinney, Minnesota
All-Big Ten Third Team	Chit-Chat Wright, Iowa	Gracie Merkle, Penn State
All-Freshman Team	Sienna Betts, UCLA	Sienna Betts, UCLA
All-Freshman Team	Jazzy Davidson, USC	Jazzy Davidson, USC
All-Freshman Team	Addie Deal, Iowa	Destiny Jackson, Illinois
All-Freshman Team	Destiny Jackson, Illinois	Kylee Kitts, Ohio State
All-Freshman Team	Addi Mack, Maryland	Addi Mack, Maryland
All-Freshman Team	Maya Makalusky, Indiana	Maya Makalusky, Indiana
All-Freshman Team	Brynn McGaughy, Washington	Brynn McGaughy, Washington
All-Freshman Team	Cearah Parchment, Illinois	Cearah Parchment, Illinois
All-Defensive Team*	Amaya Battle, Minnesota	Lauren Betts, UCLA
All-Defensive Team*	Lauren Betts, UCLA	Kennedy Cambridge, Ohio State
All-Defensive Team*	Kennedy Cambridge, Ohio State	Brooke Quarles Daniels, Michigan
All-Defensive Team*	Brooke Quarles Daniels, Michigan	Jazzy Davidson, USC
All-Defensive Team*	Jazzy Davidson, USC	Kylie Feuerbach, Iowa
All-Defensive Team*	Kylie Feuerbach, Iowa	Rashunda Jones, Michigan State
All-Defensive Team*	Tori McKinney, Minnesota	Elsa Lemmilä, Ohio State
All-Defensive Team*	Oluchi Okananwa, Maryland	Oluchi Okananwa, Maryland
All-Defensive Team*	Kiki Rice, UCLA	Not Selected (Note: The coaches' All-Defensive Team had 10 members due to a tie in voting.)
All-Defensive Team*	Kennedy Smith, USC	Not Selected

== Postseason ==
=== Big Ten tournament ===
First round Wednesday, March 4 Peacock/NBCSN
12	Nebraska	69
13	Indiana	72
10	Illinois	82
15	Wisconsin	70
11	Oregon	82
14	Purdue	64

Second round Thursday, March 5 BTN
8	Washington	76
9	USC	64
5	Ohio State	83
13	Indiana	59
7	Michigan State	69
10	Illinois	71
6	Maryland	68
11	Oregon	73

Quarterfinals; Friday, March 6 BTN
1	UCLA	78
8	Washington	60
4	Minnesota	55
5	Ohio State	60
2	Iowa	64
10	Illinois	58
3	Michigan	80
11	Oregon	58

Semifinals; Saturday, March 7 BTN
1	UCLA	72
5	Ohio State	62
2	Iowa	59
3	Michigan	42

Championship; Sunday, March 8 CBS
1	UCLA	96
2	Iowa	45

* denotes overtime period

=== NCAA tournament ===
Seed	Region	School	First Four	First round	Second round	Sweet Sixteen	Elite Eight	Final Four	Championship
1	S2	UCLA		W 96–43 vs. (16) California Baptist	W 87–68 vs. (8) Oklahoma State	W 80–56 vs. (4) Minnesota	W 70–58 vs. (3) Duke	W 51–44 vs. (1) Texas	W 79–51 vs. (1) South Carolina
2	S4	Iowa		W 58–48 vs. (15) Fairleigh Dickinson	L 75–83^{(2OT)} vs. (10) Virginia	DNP			
2	F3	Michigan		W 83–48 vs. (15) Holy Cross	W 92–63 vs. (7) NC State	W 71–52 vs. (3) Louisville	L 41–77 vs. (1) Texas	DNP	
3	F1	Ohio State		W 75–54 vs. (14) Howard	L 73–83 vs. (6) Notre Dame	DNP			
4	S2	Minnesota		W 75–58 vs. (13) Green Bay	W 65–63 vs. (5) Ole Miss	L 56–80 vs. (1) UCLA	DNP		
5	F1	Maryland		W 99–67 vs. (12) Murray State	L 66–74 vs. (4) North Carolina	DNP			
5	S4	Michigan State		W 65–62 vs. (12) Colorado State	L 71–77 vs. (4) Oklahoma	DNP			
6	S4	Washington		W 72–54 vs. (11) South Dakota State	L 59–62^{(OT)} vs. (3) TCU	DNP			
7	F1	Illinois		W 66–57 vs. (10) Colorado	L 57–75 vs. (2) Vanderbilt	DNP			
8	F3	Oregon		W 70–60 vs. (9) Virginia Tech	L 58–100 vs. (1) Texas	DNP			
9	S4	USC		W 71–67^{(OT)} vs. (8) Clemson	L 61–101 vs. (1) South Carolina	DNP			
11	S2	Nebraska	W 75–56 vs. (11) Richmond	L 62–67 vs. (6) Baylor	DNP				
		W–L (%):	1–0 (1.000)	11–1 (.917)	3–8 (.273)	2–1 (.667)	1–1 (.500)	1–0 (1.000)	1–0 (1.000)
Total: 20–11 (.645)

=== WBIT tournament ===
Seed	Region	School	1st Round	2nd Round	Quarterfinals	Semifinals	Championship
3	Utah	Wisconsin	W 65–53 vs. Oregon State (Corvallis)	W 72–65 at (2) Miami (FL) (Coral Gables)	W 67–64 vs. (4) Harvard (Madison)	L 50–67 vs. (2) Columbia (Wichita)	DNP
		W–L (%):	1–0 (1.000)	1–0 (1.000)	1–0 (1.000)	0–1 (.000)	0–0 (–)
Total: 3–1 (.750)
