= Lena Bilić =

Croatian basketball player (born 2007)

- Bilić in 2026

No. 9 – UCLA Bruins
- Position: Shooting guard / small forward
- League: Big Ten Conference

Personal information
- Born: May 2, 2007 (age 19)
- Listed height: 6 ft 3 in (1.91 m)

Career information
- High school: XVI Gimnazija
- College: UCLA (2025–present)
- Playing career: 2022–present

Career history
- 2022–2025: ŽKK Trešnjevka 2009

Career highlights
- NCAA champion (2026); Ružica Meglaj-Rimac Cup (2025)

Lena Bilić (born May 2, 2007) is a Croatian college basketball player for the UCLA Bruins of the Big Ten Conference. She previously played for ŽKK Trešnjevka 2009 of the First League of Croatia.

== Playing career ==
Bilić began her career for ŽKK Trešnjevka 2009 of the First League of Croatia. In 2024–25, she averaged 18.0 points, 7.1 assists and 6.3 rebounds per game, winning the Ružica Meglaj-Rimac Cup.

On September 17, 2024, Bilić committed to play college basketball at UCLA. On November 15, she signed a National Letter of Intent to play for the Bruins. As a freshman, Bilić averaged three points, 1.4 rebounds and 0.6 assists in limited playing time as the team won the NCAA Championship. On October 4, 2026, it was announced by head coach Cori Close, that she would miss the entire 2026–27 season after tearing her anterior cruciate ligament (ACL) in practice.

== National team career ==
Bilić made her national team debut for the Croatian under-16 national team at the 2022 FIBA U16 Women's European Championship where she averaged 12.4 points, 4.3 rebounds and 1.6 assists per game and earned a bronze medal and All-Tournament Team selection. In the 2023 FIBA U16 Women's European Championship she averaged 18 points, 6.3 rebounds and 7.1 assists per game. The following year at the FIBA Under-17 Women's Basketball World Cup, Bilić played in seven games with 15.7 points 4.9 rebounds and 3.7 assists per game. In 2024 FIBA U18 Women's EuroBasket competition, she averaged 16.1 points, 5.0 rebounds and 5.6 assists for Croatia. In the 2025 FIBA U18 Women's EuroBasket Division B Bilić was the tournament's top-scorer with 23.6 points per game and averaged 6.0 rebounds with 4.1 assists en route to a bronze medal. She averaged 17.3 points in seven games at the 2026 FIBA U20 Women's EuroBasket.

== Career statistics ==
Legend
GP	Games played	GS	Games started	MPG	Minutes per game	RPG	Rebounds per game
APG	Assists per game	SPG	Steals per game	BPG	Blocks per game	PPG	Points per game
TO	Turnovers per game	FG%	Field-goal percentage	3P%	3-point field-goal percentage	FT%	Free-throw percentage
**Bold**	Career best	°	League leader

*	Denotes seasons in which Bilić won an NCAA Championship

=== College ===
Year	Team	GP	GS	MPG	FG%	3P%	FT%	RPG	APG	SPG	BPG	TO	PPG
2025–26*	UCLA	33	0	12.1	35.5	27.4	100.0	1.4	0.6	0.4	0.3	0.2	3.0
Career		33	0	12.1	35.5	27.4	100.0	1.4	0.6	0.4	0.3	0.2	3.0
