= 2026 NCAA Women's Basketball All-Americans =

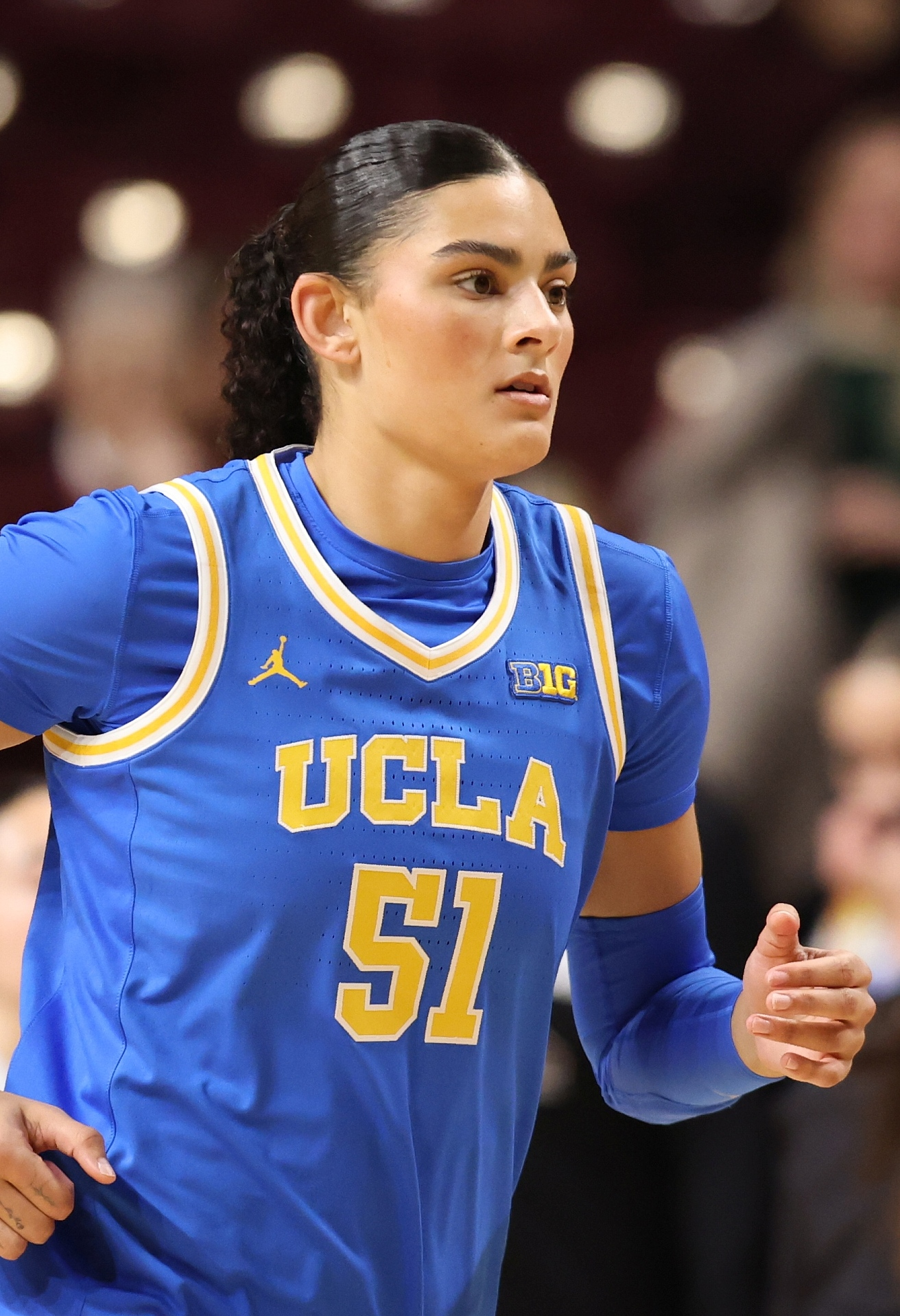
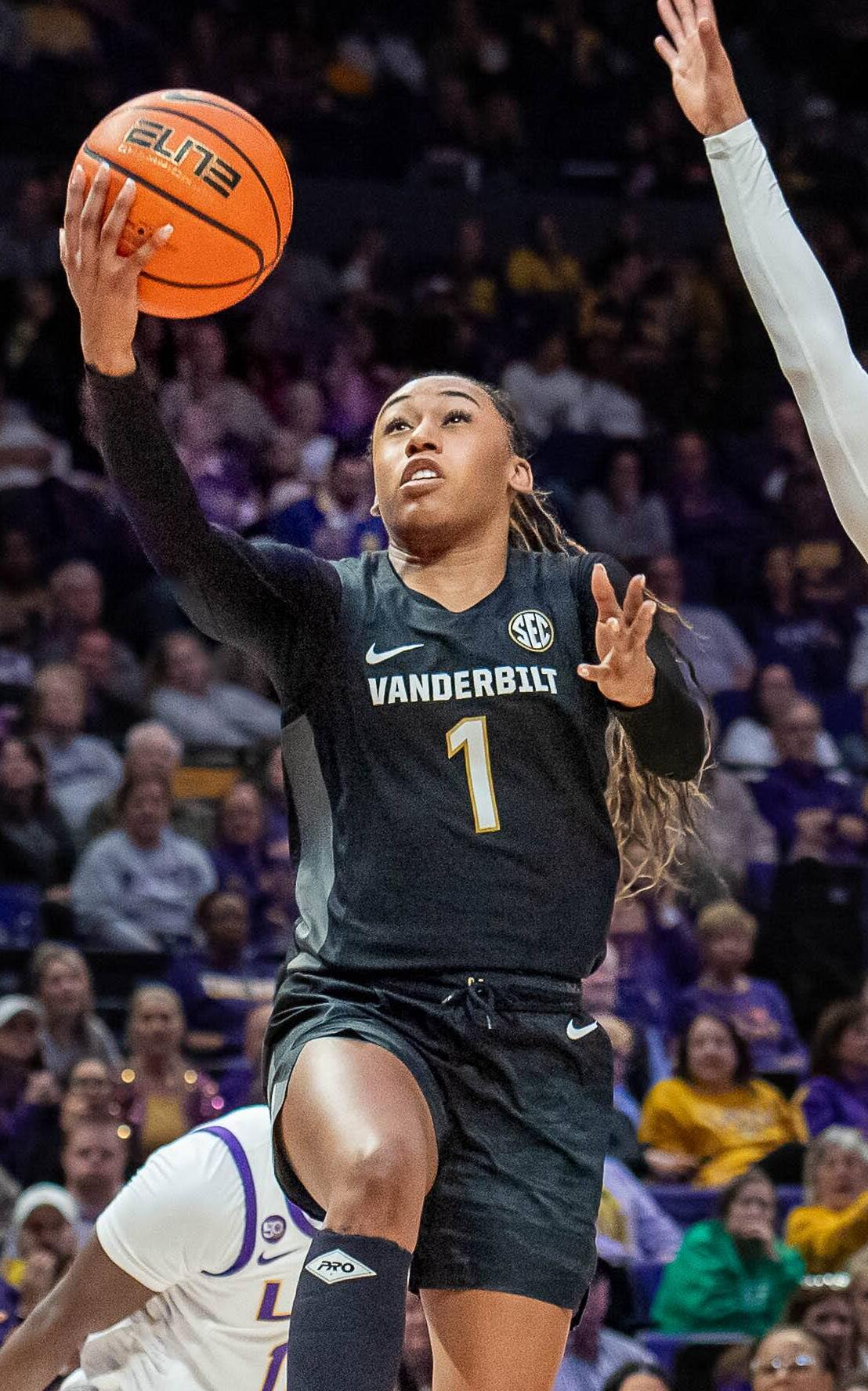
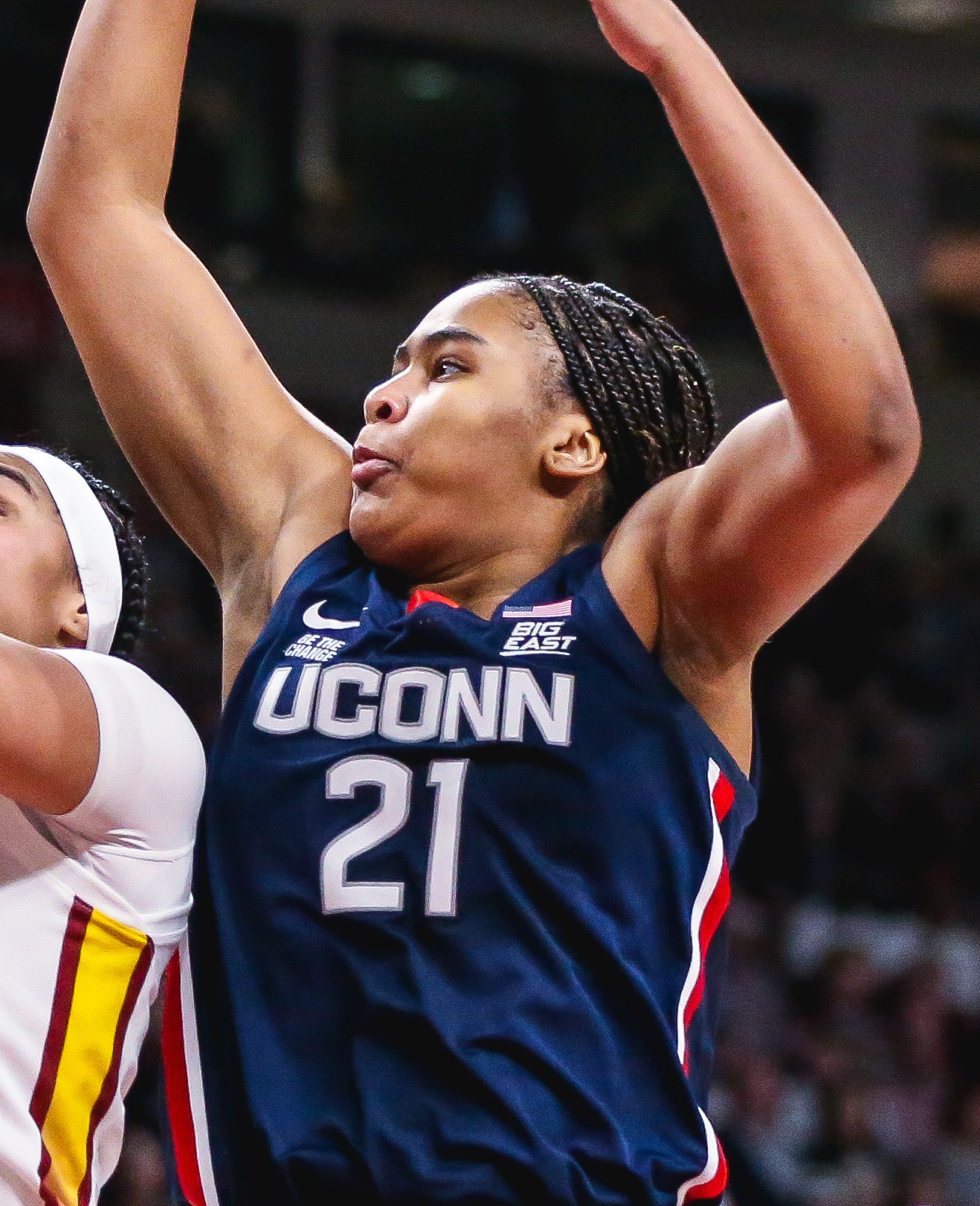
- Members of the 2026 All-America first team (AP, USBWA, ESPN, TSN). Clockwise from upper left: Betts, Blakes and Strong.
- Awarded for: 2025–26 NCAA Division I women's basketball season

An All-American team is an honorary sports team composed of the best amateur players of a specific season for each team position—who in turn are given the honorific "All-America" and typically referred to as "All-American athletes", or simply "All-Americans". Although the honorees generally do not compete together as a unit, the term is used in U.S. team sports to refer to players who are selected by members of the national media. Walter Camp selected the first All-America team in the early days of American football in 1889. The 2026 NCAA Women's Basketball All-Americans are honorary lists that include All-American selections from the Associated Press (AP), ESPN, The Sporting News (TSN), the United States Basketball Writers Association (USBWA), and the Women's Basketball Coaches Association (WBCA) for the 2025–26 NCAA Division I women's basketball season. The AP, TSN and USBWA choose three teams, while ESPN has two teams and the WBCA has one list of 10 honorees.

A consensus All-America team in women's basketball has never been organized. This differs from the practice in men's basketball, in which the NCAA uses a combination of selections by AP, USBWA, the National Association of Basketball Coaches (NABC), and Sporting News to determine a consensus All-America team. The selection of a consensus All-America men's basketball team is possible because all four organizations select at least a first and second team, with only the USBWA not selecting a third team.

Before the 2017–18 season, it was impossible for a consensus women's All-America team to be determined because the AP had been the only body that divided its women's selections into separate teams. The USBWA first named separate teams in 2017–18. The women's counterpart to the NABC, the Women's Basketball Coaches Association (WBCA), continues the USBWA's former practice of selecting a single 10-member (plus ties) team. Before the 2023–24 season, Sporting News did not select an All-America team in women's basketball.

== By selector ==
=== Associated Press (AP) ===
Announced on March 18, 2026. The three teams are selected by the same 28-member media panel that vote the AP poll during the season.

First team		Second team		Third team	
Player	School	Player	School	Player	School
Sarah Strong*	UConn	Hannah Hidalgo	Notre Dame	Olivia Olson	Michigan
Mikayla Blakes	Vanderbilt	Joyce Edwards	South Carolina	Kiki Rice	UCLA
Lauren Betts	UCLA	Olivia Miles	TCU	Flau'jae Johnson	LSU
Madison Booker	Texas	Audi Crooks	Iowa State	Toby Fournier	Duke
Azzi Fudd	UConn	Jaloni Cambridge	Ohio State	Raven Johnson	South Carolina

* Unanimous selection

==== AP Honorable Mention ====
Honorable mention selections are those who did not make one of the first three teams, but received at least one vote from the media panel.

- Raegan Beers, Oklahoma
- Zanai Barnett-Gay, Navy
- Jazzy Davidson, USC
- Maggie Doogan, Richmond
- MiLaysia Fulwiley, LSU
- Rori Harmon, Texas
- Ava Heiden, Iowa
- Gianna Kneepkens, UCLA
- Avery Koenen, North Dakota State
- Ta'Niya Latson, South Carolina
- Liv McGill, Florida
- Cotie McMahon, Ole Miss
- Brooklyn Meyer, South Dakota State
- Oluchi Okananwa, Maryland
- Khamil Pierre, NC State
- Marta Suárez, TCU
- Clara Strack, Kentucky
- Riley Weiss, Columbia
- Mikaylah Williams, LSU

=== United States Basketball Writers Association (USBWA) ===
On March 17, 2026, the USBWA announced its 16-member selection, divided into first, second, and third teams.

First team		Second team		Third team	
Player	School	Player	School	Player	School
Lauren Betts	UCLA	Madison Booker	Texas	Raegan Beers	Oklahoma
Mikayla Blakes	Vanderbilt	Jaloni Cambridge	Ohio State	Toby Fournier	Duke
Azzi Fudd	UConn	Audi Crooks	Iowa State	Rori Harmon	Texas
Hannah Hidalgo	Notre Dame	Joyce Edwards	South Carolina	Flau'jae Johnson	LSU
Sarah Strong	UConn	Olivia Miles	TCU	Olivia Olson	Michigan
(Note: The third team had six members due to a tie in voting.)				Kiki Rice	UCLA

==== USBWA Honorable Mention ====
- Shay Ciezki, Indiana
- Jazzy Davidson, USC
- Maggie Doogan, Richmond
- Ava Heiden, Iowa
- Raven Johnson, South Carolina
- Liv McGill, Florida
- Cotie McManon, Ole Miss
- Brooklyn Meyer, South Dakota State
- Clara Strack, Kentucky

=== The Sporting News (TSN) ===
On March 16, 2026, The Sporting News announced its 15-member selection, divided into first, second and third teams.

First team		Second team		Third team	
Player	School	Player	School	Player	School
Sarah Strong	UConn	Joyce Edwards	South Carolina	Toby Fournier	Duke
Mikayla Blakes	Vanderbilt	Cotie McMahon	Ole Miss	Flau'jae Johnson	LSU
Madison Booker	Texas	Olivia Miles (Note: Spelling error; listed as Olivia Myles.)	TCU	Jaloni Cambridge	Ohio State
Hannah Hidalgo	Notre Dame	Azzi Fudd	UConn	Olivia Olson	Michigan
Lauren Betts	UCLA	Audi Crooks	Iowa State	Raegan Beers	Oklahoma

=== ESPN ===
On March 11, 2026, ESPN.com was the first to announce its 10-member selection, divided into first and second teams.

First team		Second team	
Player	School	Player	School
Sarah Strong	UConn	Madison Booker	Texas
Lauren Betts	UCLA	Joyce Edwards	South Carolina
Mikayla Blakes	Vanderbilt	Olivia Miles	TCU
Azzi Fudd	UConn	Jaloni Cambridge	Ohio State
Hannah Hidalgo	Notre Dame	Olivia Olson	Michigan

=== Women's Basketball Coaches Association (WBCA) ===
The Women's Basketball Coaches Association announced a single 10-member team on April 2, 2026.

Player	School
Lauren Betts	UCLA
Mikayla Blakes	Vanderbilt
Madison Booker	Texas
Jaloni Cambridge	Ohio State
Joyce Edwards	South Carolina
Azzi Fudd	UConn
Hannah Hidalgo	Notre Dame
Raven Johnson	South Carolina
Olivia Miles	TCU
Sarah Strong	UConn
