= Clara Strack =

Canadian basketball player (born 2005)

- Strack with Kentucky in 2026

No. 13 – Kentucky Wildcats
- Position: Center
- Conference: Southeastern Conference

Personal information
- Born: November 27, 2005 (age 20)
- Listed height: 6 ft 5 in (1.96 m)

Career information
- High school: Hamburg High School (Hamburg, New York)
- College: Virginia Tech (2023–2024); Kentucky (2024–present)

Career highlights
- SEC Defensive Player of the Year (2025); 2× SEC All-Defensive Team (2025–2026); First-team All-SEC (2026); Second-team All-SEC (2025)

Clara Strack (born November 27, 2005) is an American college basketball player for Kentucky of the Southeastern Conference (SEC). She previously played for Virginia Tech.

== High school career ==
Strack attended Hamburg High School in Hamburg, New York where she set records for most points in a game (47), most points in a season and most points all-time for girl's basketball. During her senior year she averaged 24.4 points, 16.2 rebounds, 3.2 blocks and 2.3 steals per game and was named the New York State Sportswriters Association Player of the Year.

== College career ==
On July 19, 2022, Strack committed to play college basketball at Virginia Tech. During the 2023–24 season, in her freshman year, she appeared in all 33 games, with two starts, and averaged 4.5 points, 4.1 rebounds, and 1.2 blocks in 13.8 minutes per game. On November 16, 2023, she scored a career-high 19 points against HCU. She made her first career start in the first round of the 2024 NCAA tournament against Marshall, replacing an injured Elizabeth Kitley. She scored 17 points going 7-for-7 from the field. During the second round against Baylor she recorded 18 points and 10 rebounds for her first career double-double.

On April 5, 2024, she followed former Virginia Tech head coach Kenny Brooks and transferred to Kentucky. During the 2024–25 season, in her sophomore year, she started all 31 games and averaged 15.4 points, 9.7 rebounds, 2.5 assists and 2.4 blocks per game. She scored ten or more points in 26 games, and 20 or more points nine times. She had 15 double-doubles on the season, which ranked fourth in the league. She set Kentucky's single-season school records in both blocks (73) and blocks per game (2.4). She also set Kentucky's single-game record for blocks in a game with eight against Ole Miss on February 10, 2025. Following the season she was named the SEC Defensive Player of the Year, and to both the SEC All-Defensive Team and All-SEC Second Team. She was also named a top-ten finalist for the Lisa Leslie Award.

During the 2025–26 season, in her junior year, she started all 36 games and averaged 16.9 points, 10.1 rebounds, 2.53 blocks, 1.89 assists and 1.22 steals in 31.4 minutes per game. She led her team in points, rebounds, steals and blocks and had 16 doubles-doubles. She ranked second in the nation with 91 blocks, and set a new single-season program record. She became the second player to have at least 1,000 points, 600 rebounds, 150 blocks, 125 assists and 50 steals within their first two seasons at an SEC school, following Candace Parker. On February 1, 2026, against Arkansas, she scored a career-high 33 points and 15 rebounds and surpassed 1,000 career points. She was subsequently named the USBWA National Player of the Week. On February 15, 2026, against Ole Miss, she scored 28 points, nine rebounds, two blocks and an assist and was named the Naismith Trophy Player of the Week. With her two blocks in the game, she surpassed 70 on the season and became the first player in program history to have multiple seasons with at least 70 blocks. On March 5, 2026, during the second round of the 2026 SEC tournament against Georgia, she scored a career-high tying 33 points, including a career-high five 3-pointers. She became the third fastest player to surpass 1,000 career points at Kentucky, with 1,030 points through 63 games, trailing only Rhyne Howard and Valerie Still. Following the season she was named to both the SEC All-Defensive Team and All-SEC First Team. She was also named a top-five finalist for the Lisa Leslie Award, a semifinalist for the Naismith Defensive Player of the Year Award, and a USA Today All-American Second Team honoree. She also earned All-American honorable mention from the Associated Press and USBWA.

During the 2026–27 season, in her senior year, she was named to the John R. Wooden Award Preseason Top 50 Watchlist. On November 15, 2026, against Eastern Michigan she recorded 29 points and a career-high 18 rebounds.
