= Cori Close =

American basketball coach

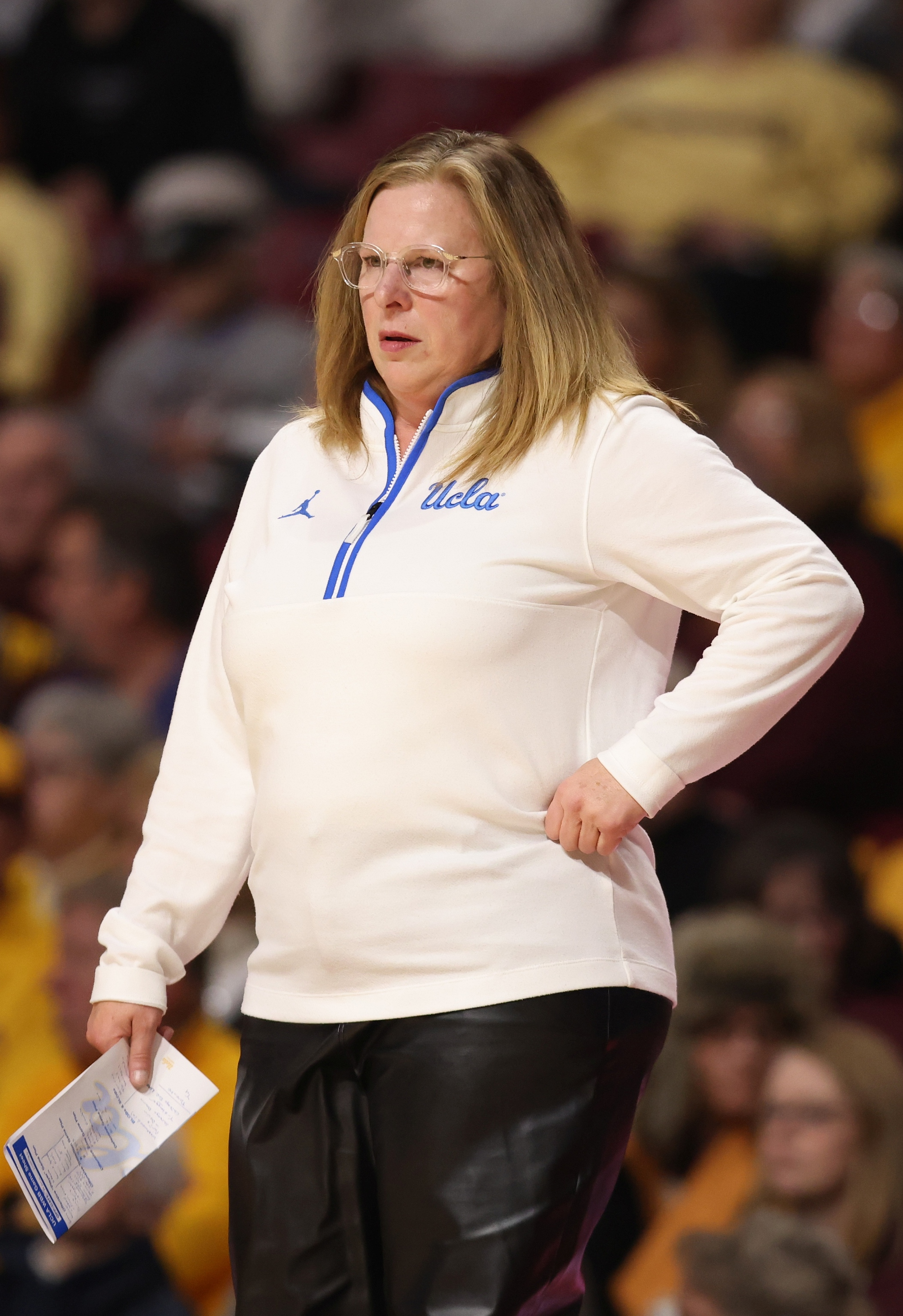
- Close with UCLA in 2026

Current position
- Title: Head coach
- Team: UCLA
- Conference: Big Ten
- Record: 358–144 (.713)

Biographical details
- Born: July 29, 1971 (age 55); Milpitas, California, U.S.

Playing career
- 1989–1993: UC Santa Barbara
- Position: Guard

Coaching career (HC unless noted)
- 1993–1995: UCLA (assistant)
- 1995–2004: UC Santa Barbara (Asst./Assoc.)
- 2004–2011: Florida State (AHC)
- 2011–present: UCLA

Head coaching record
- Overall: 358–144 (.713)

Accomplishments and honors

Championships
- NCAA Division I tournament (2026); 2 NCAA Regional—Final Four (2025, 2026); WNIT (2015); 2 Big Ten tournament (2025, 2026); Big Ten regular season (2026)

Awards
- USBWA Coach of the Year (2025); Naismith Women's College Coach of the Year (2025); Big Ten Coach of the Year (2026)

Cori Rashel Close (born July 29, 1971) is an American basketball coach who is the head coach for the UCLA Bruins women's team. She played college basketball as a guard for the UC Santa Barbara Gauchos from 1989 to 1993, serving as a team captain during her final two seasons and helping them reach consecutive NCAA tournament appearances. Following the end of her playing career, Close served as an assistant coach with UCLA from 1993 to 1995, UC Santa Barbara from 1995 to 2004, and the Florida State Seminoles from 2004 to 2011 before being named UCLA's head coach in 2011. Close won the 2026 basketball championship with the Bruins. The Bruins went 37–1 and won the program's first basketball championship in the NCAA era.

== College career UCSB 1989-93 ==
Close played four years on the UC Santa Barbara Gauchos women's basketball team. As of the 2025-26 season, she was listed in the career top ten in assists and steals for the Gauchos. She was the Big West conference tournament player of the game in 1993. Her teams advanced to the second round of the NCAA tournament in 1992 and 1993.

=== College statistics ===
Ratios
Year	Team	GP	FG%	3P%	FT%	RPG	APG	BPG	SPG	PPG
1989–90	UC Santa Barbara	13	43.2%	27.3%	65.2%	2.85	2.69	0.00	2.08	6.31
1990–91	UC Santa Barbara	29	41.3%	30.8%	75.9%	2.62	4.28	0.03	1.90	8.97
1991–92	UC Santa Barbara	32	48.8%	31.9%	77.5%	2.28	5.84	0.06	1.88	12.69
1992–93	UC Santa Barbara	31	43.4%	36.8%	79.8%	0.52	8.29	0.06	2.52	15.35
Career		105	44.6%	33.8%	77.2%	1.92	5.74	0.05	2.10	11.66

Totals
Year	Team	GP	FG	FGA	3P	3PA	FT	FTA	REB	A	BK	ST	PTS
1989–90	UC Santa Barbara	13	32	74	3	11	15	23	37	35	0	27	82
1990–91	UC Santa Barbara	29	93	225	8	26	66	87	76	124	1	55	260
1991–92	UC Santa Barbara	32	145	297	23	72	93	120	73	187	2	60	406
1992–93	UC Santa Barbara	31	169	389	35	95	103	129	16	257	2	78	476
Career		105	439	985	69	204	277	359	202	603	5	220	1224

== Coaching career ==
=== UCLA (1993-95) ===
Close was assistant on the Bruin coaching staff in for the 1993–94 and 1994-95 seasons, where she established a mentorship relationship with coach emeritus John Wooden. Close said that the bond started because she shared the same first name spelling as Wooden's great-granddaughter.

=== UC Santa Barbara ===
Cori became an assistant coach at her alma mater in 1995.

=== Florida State ===
In May 2004, Close became associate head coach at Florida State under head coach Sue Semrau. The Seminoles made the NCAA Tournament in each of Close's seven seasons on the staff in Tallahassee, including the program's first appearances in the Sweet Sixteen (2007) and Elite Eight (2010).

=== UCLA (2011-present) ===
On April 21, 2011, Close was named head coach for the UCLA Bruins women's basketball program. She led the Bruins to their first Final Four of the NCAA tournament in 2025, after taking them to the Sweet Sixteen six times, advancing to the regional final once in 2018.

In the 2026 NCAA national championship game, the Bruins defeated South Carolina 79–51 for the program's first NCAA title.

==== "Mind Gym" ====
One of the tenets Close brought to the program along with physical training was mental training, known as "mind gym". Players work on a program to help build confidence and self-image, and to move past poor performances. The mind gym has been one of the keys to the success of the program.

==== Leather pants ====
Close explained the superstition around her wearing leather pants on gameday was started by strength coach Ash Samaniego in Paris, France, before the 2024-25 season opener. Close said she is undefeated when wearing the pants since the Bruins beat Louisville in that 2024 game. She did not wear the pants in the 2026 NCAA semifinal against Texas. Although not superstitious herself, she stated in the pregame interview that enough people commented that she felt she needed to wear them for the 2026 National Championship game.

== Head coaching record ==
Record table
Season	Team	Overall	Conference	Standing	Postseason
UCLA (Pac-12 Conference) (2011–2024)
2011–12	UCLA	14–16	9–9	T–5th	
2012–13	UCLA	26–8	14–4	3rd	NCAA Second Round
2013–14	UCLA	13–18	7–11	8th	
2014–15	UCLA	19–18	8–10	6th	WNIT Champions
2015–16	UCLA	26–9	14–4	T–3rd	NCAA Sweet Sixteen
2016–17	UCLA	25–9	13–5	4th	NCAA Sweet Sixteen
2017–18	UCLA	27–8	14–4	T–3rd	NCAA Elite Eight
2018–19	UCLA	22–13	12–6	4th	NCAA Sweet Sixteen
2019–20	UCLA	26–5	14–4	T–2nd	Postseason not held
2020–21	UCLA	17–6	12–4	3rd	NCAA Second Round
2021–22	UCLA	18–13	8–8	7th	WNIT Semifinals
2022–23	UCLA	27–10	11–7	T–4th	NCAA Sweet Sixteen
2023–24	UCLA	27–7	13–5	T–2nd	NCAA Sweet Sixteen
UCLA (Big Ten Conference) (2024–present)
2024–25	UCLA	34–3	16–2	2nd	NCAA Final Four
2025–26	UCLA	37–1	18–0	1st	NCAA Champions
2026–27	UCLA	0–0	0–0		
UCLA:		358–144 (.713)	183–83 (.688)		
Total:		358–144 (.713)			
National champion Postseason invitational champion Conference regular season champion Conference regular season and conference tournament champion Division regular season champion Division regular season and conference tournament champion Conference tournament champion

== Awards and honors ==
- March 23, 2016 – Close was named the 2016 United States Marine Corps/WBCA NCAA Division I Region 5 Coach of the Year
- March 6, 2019 – Close was named the Pac-12 Coach of the Year by Pac-12 women's basketball media members
- March 20, 2025 – Close was named USBWA Coach of the Year
- April 2, 2025 – Close was the 2025 Naismith Women's College Coach of the Year
