= Southeastern Conference Women's Basketball Defensive Player of the Year =

SEC Women's Basketball Player of the Year
- Awarded for: the top women's basketball defensive player in the Southeastern Conference
- Country: United States
- First award: 2004
- Currently held by: Raven Johnson, South Carolina

The Southeastern Conference Women's Basketball Defensive Player of the Year is an annual college basketball award presented to the top women's basketball defensive player in the Southeastern Conference.

Five players have won the award more than once. Armintie Herrington of Mississippi, Jordan Jones of Texas A&M, and A'ja Wilson of South Carolina, and Teaira McCowan of Mississippi State have won twice, and Aliyah Boston of South Carolina won four times. The award was shared three times. It was given to Martha Alwal and Jordan Jones in 2014, A'ja Wilson and Teaira McCowan in 2018, and Aliyah Boston and Que Morrison in 2021.

South Carolina has the most winners with six.

== Key ==
†	Co-Player of the Year
C	Coaches selection
M	Media selection

== Winners ==
Season	Player	School	Source(s)
2003–04	Vanessa Hayden	Florida	
2004–05	Armintie Herrington	Mississippi	
2005–06	Sherill Baker	Georgia	
2006–07	Armintie Herrington (2)	Mississippi	
2007–08	Sylvia Fowles	LSU	
2008–09	Jennifer Risper	Vanderbilt	
2009–10	Armelie Lumanu	Mississippi State	
2010–11	Victoria Dunlap	Kentucky	
2011–12	Glory Johnson	Tennessee	
2012–13	Ieasia Walker	South Carolina	
2013–14^{†}	Martha Alwal	Mississippi State	
2013–14^{†}	Jordan Jones	Texas A&M	
2014–15	Jordan Jones (2)	Texas A&M	
2015–16	A'ja Wilson	South Carolina	
2016–17	Raigyne Louis	LSU	
2017–18^{†}	A'ja Wilson (2)	South Carolina	
2017–18^{†}	Teaira McCowan	Mississippi State	
2018–19	Teaira McCowan (2)	Mississippi State	
2019–20	Aliyah Boston	South Carolina	
2020–21^{†}	Aliyah Boston (2)	South Carolina	
2020–21^{†}	Que Morrison	Georgia	
2021–22	Aliyah Boston (3)	South Carolina	
2022–23	Aliyah Boston (4)	South Carolina	
2023–24	Kamilla Cardoso	South Carolina	
2024–25	Clara Strack	Kentucky	
2025–26	Raven Johnson	South Carolina	

== Winners by school ==
School (year joined)	Winners	Years
South Carolina (1991)	9	2013, 2016, 2018, 2020, 2021, 2022, 2023, 2024, 2026
Mississippi State (1932)	4	2010, 2014, 2018, 2019
Georgia (1932)	2	2006, 2021
Kentucky (1932)	2	2011, 2025
LSU (1932)	2	2008, 2017
Ole Miss (1932)	2	2005, 2007
Texas A&M (2012)	2	2014, 2015
Florida (1932)	1	2004
Tennessee (1932)	1	2012
Vanderbilt (1932)	1	2009
Arkansas (1991)	0	—
Auburn (1932)	0	—
Missouri (2012)	0	—
Alabama (1932)	0	—
Texas (2024)	0	—
Oklahoma (2024)	0	—
