= 2025–26 South Carolina Gamecocks women's basketball team =

US college basketball team

2025–26 South Carolina Gamecocks women's basketball

SEC regular season champions The Real SC Champions

NCAA tournament, Runner-up
- Conference: Southeastern Conference

Ranking
- Coaches: No. 2
- AP: No. 2
- Record: 36–4 (15–1 SEC)
- Head coach: Dawn Staley (18th season)
- Assistant coaches: Lisa Boyer; Wendale Farrow; Jolette Law; Khadijah Sessions; Mary Wooley
- Home arena: Colonial Life Arena

2025–26 SEC women's basketball standings
	Conf.				Overall
Team	W		L	PCT	W		L	PCT
No. 2 South Carolina	15	–	1	.938	36	–	4	.900
No. 10 Vanderbilt	13	–	3	.813	29	–	5	.853
No. 4 Texas †	13	–	3	.813	35	–	4	.897
No. 8 LSU	12	–	4	.750	29	–	6	.829
No. 12 Oklahoma	11	–	5	.688	26	–	8	.765
Tennessee	8	–	8	.500	16	–	14	.533
No. 21 Ole Miss	8	–	8	.500	24	–	12	.667
Georgia	8	–	8	.500	22	–	10	.688
No. 14 Kentucky	8	–	8	.500	25	–	11	.694
Texas A&M	7	–	9	.438	14	–	13	.519
No. 24 Alabama	7	–	9	.438	24	–	11	.686
Florida	5	–	11	.313	18	–	15	.545
Mississippi State	5	–	11	.313	18	–	13	.581
Missouri	4	–	12	.250	17	–	17	.500
Auburn	3	–	13	.188	15	–	17	.469
Arkansas	1	–	15	.063	12	–	20	.375
† 2026 SEC tournament winner Rankings from AP poll

The 2025–26 South Carolina Gamecocks women's basketball team represented the University of South Carolina during the 2025–26 NCAA Division I women's basketball season. The Gamecocks, led by eighteenth-year head coach Dawn Staley, played their home games at Colonial Life Arena and competed as members of the Southeastern Conference (SEC), where they won a 5th consecutive regular season championship. For the second consecutive season, they were also the NCAA tournament runner-up.

== Previous season ==
The Gamecocks finished the 2024–25 season 35–4, 15–1 in SEC play, to share the SEC regular season title with Texas. As the No. 1 seed in the SEC tournament, they defeated Vanderbilt, Oklahoma and Texas to win the SEC Tournament. They received an automatic bid to the NCAA tournament as the No. 1 seed in the Birmingham 2 region. They defeated Tennessee Tech and Indiana in the first and second rounds, Maryland in the sweet sixteen and Duke in the elite eight to advance to their 5th straight Final Four where they defeated SEC member Texas before losing in the national championship game to UConn.

== Offseason ==
=== Departures ===
South Carolina Departures
Name	Number	Pos.	Height	Year	Hometown	Reason for departure
Te-Hina Paopao	0	G	5'9"	Senior	Oceanside, CA	Graduated/2025 WNBA draft; selected 18th overall by Atlanta Dream
MiLaysia Fulwiley	12	G	5'10"	Sophomore	Columbia, SC	Transferred to LSU
Sania Feagin	20	F	6'3"	Senior	Ellenwood, GA	Graduated/2025 WNBA draft; selected 21st overall by Los Angeles Sparks
Bree Hall	23	G	6'0"	Senior	Dayton, OH	Graduated/2025 WNBA draft; selected 20th overall by Indiana Fever
Sakima Walker	35	C	6'5"	Senior	Columbus, OH	Transferred to California

=== Incoming transfers ===
South Carolina incoming transfers
Name	Number	Pos.	Height	Year	Hometown	Previous school
Ta'Niya Latson	00	G	5'8"	Senior	Miami, FL	Florida State
Madina Okot	11	C	6'6"	Senior	Mumias, Kenya	Mississippi State

=== 2025 recruiting class ===
College recruiting
Name	Hometown	School	Height	Weight	Commit date
Agot Makeer; W	Ontario, Canada	Montverde Academy	6 ft 1 in (1.85 m)	N/A	
Agot Makeer; W	Recruit ratings: ESPN: (97)				
Ayla McDowell; W	Cypress, TX	Cypress Springs	6 ft 2 in (1.88 m)	N/A	
Ayla McDowell; W	Recruit ratings: ESPN: (96)				
Overall recruit ranking:
Note: In many cases, Scout, Rivals, 247Sports, On3, and ESPN may conflict in their listings of height and weight.; In these cases, the average was taken. ESPN grades are on a 100-point scale.; Sources: "2025 Player Commits". ESPN. Archived from the original on September 15, 2025.

== Roster ==
2025–26 South Carolina Gamecocks women's basketball team
Players
Coaches

Pos.	#	Name	Height	Year	Previous school	Hometown
G	00	Ta'Niya Latson	5 ft 8 in (1.73 m)	Sr	American Heritage; Florida State	Miami, FL
G	1	Maddy McDaniel	5 ft 9 in (1.75 m)	So	Bishop McNamara	Upper Marlboro, MD
G	5	Tessa Johnson	6 ft 0 in (1.83 m)	Jr	St. Michael-Albertville HS	Albertville, MN
F	8	Joyce Edwards	6 ft 3 in (1.91 m)	So	Camden	Camden, SC
C	11	Madina Okot	6 ft 6 in (1.98 m)	Sr	Kaya Tiwi Secondary School; Mississippi State	Mumias, Kenya
G	15	Adhel Tac	6 ft 5 in (1.96 m)	RS So	South Grand Prairie	Grand Prairie, TX
F	21	Chloe Kitts (injured) (redshirt)	6 ft 2 in (1.88 m)	Sr	DME Academy	Oviedo, FL
G	24	Ayla McDowell	6 ft 1 in (1.85 m)	Fr	Cypress Springs	Cypress, TX
G	25	Raven Johnson	5 ft 9 in (1.75 m)	RS Sr	Westlake	Atlanta, GA
F	30	Maryam Dauda	6 ft 4 in (1.93 m)	RS Sr	Bentonville; Arkansas	Bentonville, AR
F	31	Alicia Tournebize	6 ft 7 in (2.01 m)	Fr	Lycée Alain Fournier; Tango Bourges Basket	Charmeil, France
G	44	Agot Makeer	6 ft 1 in (1.85 m)	Fr	Montverde Academy	Thunder Bay, ON

Head coach

- Dawn Staley (Virginia)

Assistant coach(es)

- Lisa Boyer (Ithaca)
- Jolette Law (Iowa)
- Wendale Farrow (Eastern Michigan)
- Khadijah Sessions (South Carolina)
- Mary Wooley (USC Aiken)

Legend

- (C) Team captain
- (S) Suspended
- (I) Ineligible
- (W) Walk-on
- Injured
- Current redshirt

Roster

== Preseason ==
=== SEC Media Poll ===
SEC Media Poll
Predicted finish	Team
1	South Carolina
2	Texas
3	LSU
4	Tennessee
5	Oklahoma
6	Ole Miss
7	Vanderbilt
8	Kentucky
9	Alabama
10	Mississippi State
11	Florida
12	Georgia
13	Missouri
14	Texas A&M
15	Auburn
16	Arkansas

== Schedule and results ==
Date time, TV	Rank^{#}	Opponent^{#}	Result	Record	High points	High rebounds	High assists	Site (attendance) city, state
Exhibition
October 24, 2025*; 7:00 p.m.	No. 2	Anderson	W 112–31		27 – Edwards	15 – Okot	4 – Meeker	Colonial Life Arena; Columbia, SC
October 30, 2025*; 6:00 p.m.	No. 2	vs. No. 11 North Carolina; Bad Boy Mowers Series - Atlanta	W 91–82		19 – Tied	9 – Edwards	5 – R. Johnson	State Farm Arena (500); Atlanta, GA
Non-conference regular season
November 3, 2025*; 7:00 p.m., SECN+/ESPN+	No. 2	Grand Canyon	W 94–54	1–0	20 – Latson	8 – R. Johnson	7 – R. Johnson	Colonial Life Arena (15,601); Columbia, SC
November 7, 2025*; 7:00 p.m., SECN+/ESPN+	No. 2	Bowling Green	W 114–47	2–0	24 – Edwards	11 – Okot	11 – R. Johnson	Colonial Life Arena (16,649); Columbia, SC
November 11, 2025*; 6:00 p.m., ESPN2	No. 2	Clemson; Rivalry	W 65–37	3–0	18 – Edwards	12 – Okot	3 – Tied	Colonial Life Arena (16,623); Columbia, SC
November 15, 2025*; 9:00 p.m., FOX	No. 2	vs. No. 8 USC; The Real SC	W 69–52	4–0	17 – Edwards	15 – Okot	5 – T. Johnson	Crypto.com Arena (8,150); Los Angeles, CA
November 19, 2025*; 7:00 p.m., SECN	No. 2	Winthrop	W 106–56	5–0	24 – Latson	11 – Okot	10 – R. Johnson	Colonial Life Arena (15,787); Columbia, SC
November 23, 2025*; 2:00 p.m., SECN+/ESPN+	No. 2	Queens	W 121–49	6–0	25 – Edwards	12 – Okot	7 – R. Johnson	Colonial Life Arena (15,222); Columbia, SC
November 26, 2025*; 4:30 p.m., TruTV	No. 2	vs. Duke; Players Era Festival semifinals	W 83–66	7–0	23 – Okot	13 – Okot	6 – Tied	Michelob Ultra Arena (2,386); Paradise, NV
November 27, 2025*; 8:00 p.m, TruTV	No. 2	vs. No. 4 Texas; Players Era Festival Championship Game	L 64–66	7–1	16 – Tied	11 – Okot	6 – R. Johnson	Michelob Ultra Arena; Paradise, NV
December 4, 2025*; 7:00 p.m., ESPN	No. 3	at No. 22 Louisville; ACC–SEC Challenge	W 79–77	8–1	23 – Okot	13 – Okot	8 – R. Johnson	KFC Yum! Center (10,012); Louisville, KY
December 7, 2025*; 12:00 p.m., SECN	No. 3	North Carolina Central	W 106–42	9–1	32 – Latson	10 – Edwards	6 – Edwards	Colonial Life Arena (15,677); Columbia, SC
December 14, 2025*; 3:30 p.m., ESPN	No. 3	Penn State	W 95–55	10–1	29 – Edwards	7 – R. Johnson	8 – Latson	Colonial Life Arena (15,601); Columbia, SC
December 18, 2025*; 7:00 p.m., ESPN2	No. 3	at South Florida	W 103–44	11–1	34 – Edwards	10 – Okot	6 – R. Johnson	Yuengling Center (3,767); Tampa, FL
December 20, 2025*; 2:00 p.m., ESPN+	No. 3	at Florida Gulf Coast	W 105–43	12–1	29 – Edwards	12 – Okot	7 – Latson	Alico Arena (3,527); Fort Myers, FL
December 28, 2025*; 12:00 p.m., SECN	No. 3	Providence	W 96–55	13–1	18 – Tied	13 – Okot	6 – R. Johnson	Colonial Life Arena (15,065); Columbia, SC
SEC regular season
January 1, 2026; 2:00 p.m., SECN+/ESPN+	No. 3	Alabama	W 83–57	14–1 (1–0)	25 – Edwards	9 – Okot	5 – Tied	Colonial Life Arena (14,367); Columbia, SC
January 4, 2026; 2:00 p.m., SECN	No. 3	at Florida	W 74–63	15–1 (2–0)	17 – R. Johnson	17 – Okot	5 – McDaniel	O'Connell Center (6,006); Gainesville, FL
January 8, 2026; 7:30 p.m., SECN+/ESPN+	No. 3	at Arkansas	W 93–58	16–1 (3–0)	22 – Edwards	10 – Okot	6 – McDaniel	Bud Walton Arena (2,963); Fayetteville, AR
January 11, 2026; 2:00 p.m., SECN	No. 3	Georgia; We Back Pat	W 65–43	17−1 (4−0)	14 – Tied	10 – Tied	3 – Latson	Colonial Life Arena (15,536); Columbia, SC
January 15, 2026; 7:00 p.m., ESPN2	No. 2	No. 4 Texas	W 68–65	18−1 (5−0)	14 – Edwards	8 – Edwards	6 – R. Johnson	Colonial Life Arena (17,188); Columbia, SC
January 18, 2026*; 12:00 p.m., ESPN+	No. 2	at Coppin State	W 90–48	19–1	26 – Edwards	12 – Okot	5 – Latson	Physical Education Complex (3,371); Baltimore, MD
January 22, 2026; 7:00 p.m., ESPN	No. 2	at No. 16 Oklahoma	L 82–94 ^{OT}	19–2 (5–1)	19 – T. Johnson	6 – Tac	5 – R. Johnson	Lloyd Noble Center (7,402); Norman, OK
January 25, 2026; 3:00 p.m., ESPN	No. 2	No. 5 Vanderbilt	W 103–74	20–2 (6–1)	21 – Latson	7 – Tied	6 – Tied	Colonial Life Arena (17,002); Columbia, SC
January 29, 2026; 9:00 p.m., SECN	No. 3	at Auburn	W 81–51	21–2 (7–1)	20 – Edwards	6 – Okot	6 – McDaniel	Neville Arena (4,099); Auburn, AL
February 2, 2026; 8:00 p.m., ESPN2	No. 3	at Texas A&M	W 71–56	22–2 (8–1)	28 – Edwards	11 – Edwards	8 – R. Johnson	Reed Arena (4,332); College Station, TX
February 5, 2026; 6:30 p.m., SECN	No. 3	Mississippi State; Play4Kay	W 88–45	23–2 (9–1)	21 – Edwards	10 – Okot	7 – R. Johnson	Colonial Life Arena (15,204); Columbia, SC
February 8, 2026; 3:00 p.m., ABC	No. 3	No. 19 Tennessee	W 93–50	24–2 (10–1)	21 – Latson	15 – Okot	7 – R. Johnson	Colonial Life Arena (16,206); Columbia, SC
February 14, 2026; 8:30 p.m., ABC	No. 3	at No. 6 LSU	W 79–72	25–2 (11–1)	21 – T. Johnson	17 – Okot	6 – R. Johnson	Pete Maravich Assembly Center (13,200); Baton Rouge, LA
February 19, 2026; 8:30 p.m., SECN	No. 3	at No. 25 Alabama	W 76–57	26–2 (12–1)	23 – Edwards	16 – Okot	4 – Tied	Coleman Coliseum (3,703); Tuscaloosa, AL
February 22, 2026; 12:00 p.m., ESPN	No. 3	No. 17 Ole Miss	W 85–48	27–2 (13–1)	21 – Edwards	10 – Okot	7 – R. Johnson	Colonial Life Arena (18,000); Columbia, SC
February 26, 2026; 8:00 p.m., SECN	No. 3	Missouri	W 112–71	28–2 (14–1)	26 – Okot	17 – Okot	7 – Latson	Colonial Life Arena (15,526); Columbia, SC
March 1, 2026; 2:00 p.m., SECN+/ESPN+	No. 3	at No. 16 Kentucky	W 60–56	29–2 (15–1)	21 – Okot	13 – Okot	5 – R. Johnson	Memorial Coliseum (6,250); Lexington, KY
SEC Tournament
March 6, 2026; 12:00 p.m., ESPN	(1) No. 3	vs. (9) No. 17 Kentucky; Quarterfinals	W 87–64	30–2	21 – Edwards	13 – Okot	6 – Latson	Bon Secours Wellness Arena; Greenville, SC
March 7, 2026; 4:30 p.m., ESPN2	(1) No. 3	vs. (4) No. 6 LSU; Semifinals	W 83–77	31–2	22 – R. Johnson	13 – Okot	8 – R. Johnson	Bon Secours Wellness Arena; Greenville, SC
March 8, 2026; 3:00 p.m., ESPN	(1) No. 3	vs. (3) No. 4 Texas; Championship	L 61–78	31–3	13 – Edwards	7 – Tournebize	4 – R. Johnson	Bon Secours Wellness Arena (13,567); Greenville, SC
NCAA Tournament
March 21, 2026*; 1:00 p.m., ABC	(1 S4) No. 4	(16 S4) Southern; First Round	W 103–34	32–3	27 – Edwards	11 – Tournebize	6 – Latson	Colonial Life Arena; Columbia, SC
March 23, 2026*; 8:00 p.m., ESPN	(1 S4) No. 4	(9 S4) USC; Second Round	W 101–61	33–3	23 – Edwards	15 – Okot	5 – Latson	Colonial Life Arena (10,879); Columbia, SC
March 27, 2026*; 7:30 p.m., ESPN	(1 S4) No. 4	vs. (4 S4) No. 10 Oklahoma; Sweet Sixteen	W 94–68	34–3	28 – Latson	12 – Okot	5 – Latson	Golden 1 Center; Sacramento, CA
March 30, 2026*; 9:00 p.m., ESPN	(1 S4) No. 4	vs. (3 S4) No. 14 TCU; Elite Eight	W 78–52	35–3	24 – Edwards	12 – Edwards	6 – Johnson	Golden 1 Center (8,558); Sacramento, CA
April 3, 2026*; 7:00 p.m., ESPN	(1 S4) No. 4	vs. (1 FW1) No. 1 UConn; Final Four	W 62–48	36–3	16 – Latson	11 – Latson	3 – McDaniel	Mortgage Matchup Center (15,856); Phoenix, AZ
April 5, 2026*; 3:30 p.m., ABC	(1 S4) No. 4	vs. (1 S2) No. 2 UCLA; National Championship	L 51–79	36–4	14 – T. Johnson	11 – Edwards	3 – Edwards	Mortgage Matchup Center (15,856); Phoenix, AZ
*Non-conference game. ^{#}Rankings from AP Poll. (#) Tournament seedings in parentheses. S4=Sacramento 4. FW1=Fort Worth 1. All times are in Eastern Time. Source:

== Rankings ==
Ranking movements Legend: ██ Increase in ranking ██ Decrease in ranking ( ) = First-place votes
	Week																				
Poll	Pre	1	2	3	4	5	6	7	8	9	10	11	12	13	14	15	16	17	18	19	Final
AP	2 (4)	2 (2)	2 (3)	2 (1)	3	3	3	3	3*	3	2	2	3	3	3	3	3	3	4	4	2
Coaches	2 (3)	2 (2)	2 (3)	2 (2)	3	3	3	3	3	3	2	2	3	3	3	3	3	3	4	4	2

*AP did not release a week 8 poll.

== See also ==
- 2025–26 South Carolina Gamecocks men's basketball team
