= Raven Johnson =

American basketball player (born 2003)

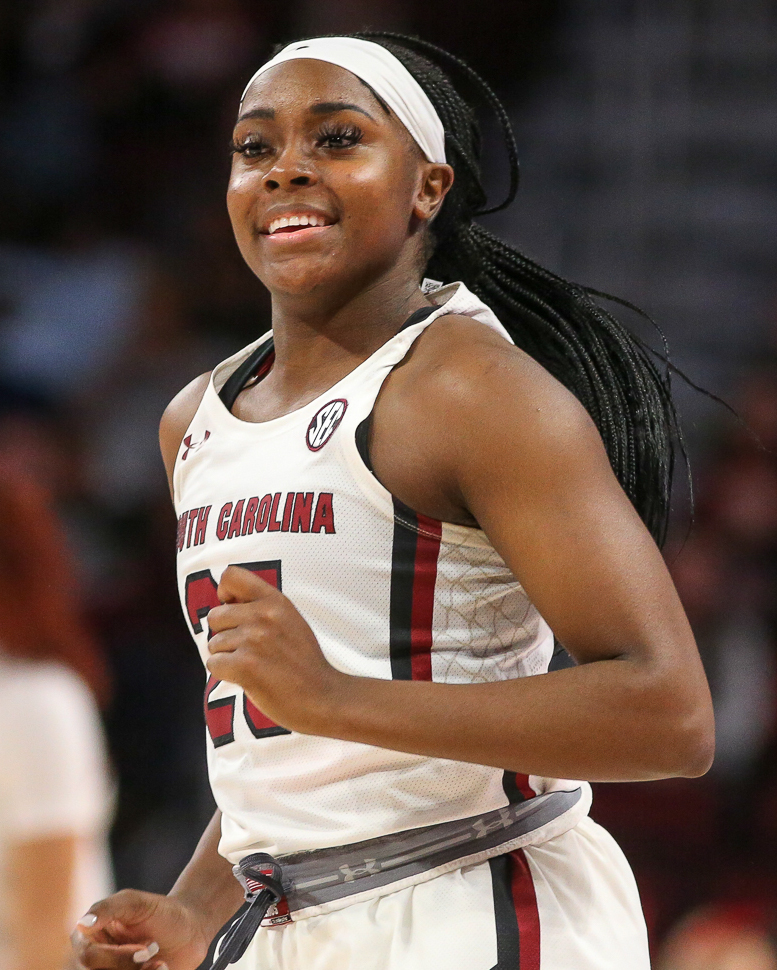
- Johnson with South Carolina in 2023

No. 3 – Indiana Fever
- Position: Point guard
- League: WNBA

Personal information
- Born: March 4, 2003 (age 23) Atlanta, Georgia, U.S.
- Listed height: 5 ft 8 in (1.73 m)
- Listed weight: 167 lb (76 kg)

Career information
- High school: Westlake (Atlanta, Georgia)
- College: South Carolina (2021–2026)
- WNBA draft: 2026: 1st round, 10th overall pick
- Drafted by: Indiana Fever
- Playing career: 2026–present

Career history
- 2026–present: Indiana Fever

Career highlights
- 2× NCAA champion (2022, 2024); WBCA Coaches' All-American (2026); Third-team All-American – AP (2026); SEC Defensive Player of the Year (2026); 2× SEC All-Defensive Team (2025, 2026); Second-team All-SEC (2026); SEC All-Freshman Team (2023); Naismith Prep Player of the Year (2021); MaxPreps National Player of the Year (2021); McDonald's All-American (2021); 2× Miss Georgia Basketball (2020, 2021)
- Stats at Basketball Reference
Medals
Women's basketball
Representing United States
FIBA AmeriCup
Silver medal – second place	2023 Mexico	Team

Raven Johnson (born March 4, 2003) is an American professional basketball player for the Indiana Fever of the Women's National Basketball Association (WNBA). Johnson played college basketball for the South Carolina Gamecocks of the Southeastern Conference (SEC).

== High school career ==
Johnson played basketball for Westlake High School in Atlanta. She played alongside Ta'Niya Latson and helped her team win four straight state titles and Geico High School National Championship. Johnson was twice named Miss Georgia Basketball by the Atlanta Tipoff Club and The Atlanta Journal-Constitution All-Classification Player of the Year. As a senior, she received Naismith Prep Player of the Year and Georgia Gatorade Player of the Year honors and was a McDonald's All-American selection. Johnson was the first woman to play in a men's All-American Game at 2021 Iverson Classic

=== Recruiting ===
Johnson was rated a five-star recruit, the number two player and the top point guard in the 2021 class by ESPN. On June 25, 2020, she committed to play college basketball for South Carolina.

== College career ==
Johnson suffered a season-ending left knee injury in her second career game with South Carolina. Despite her absence, her team won the national championship. In her redshirt freshman season, Johnson became a key reserve for the Gamecocks. On February 5, 2023, she recorded a season-high 14 points and seven assists in an 81–77 win against UConn. Johnson scored 13 points in a 77–73 loss to Iowa at the Final Four of the 2023 NCAA tournament. As a freshman, she averaged 4.2 points, 3.4 assists and 2.6 rebounds per game, earning Southeastern Conference (SEC) All-Freshman honors.

== Professional career ==
The Indiana Fever selected Johnson No. 10 overall in the 2026 WNBA Draft. In her professional debut against the Dallas Wings on May 9, 2026, Johnson tallied 4 points to go along with 2 rebounds, 2 assists, and 1 steal in 11 minutes.

== National team career ==
Johnson was named to the United States national team for the 2023 FIBA Women's AmeriCup in Mexico. She averaged 5.6 points, 3.4 rebounds and 1.9 assists per game, helping her team win the silver medal.

== Career statistics ==
Legend
GP	Games played	GS	Games started	MPG	Minutes per game	RPG	Rebounds per game
APG	Assists per game	SPG	Steals per game	BPG	Blocks per game	PPG	Points per game
TO	Turnovers per game	FG%	Field-goal percentage	3P%	3-point field-goal percentage	FT%	Free-throw percentage
**Bold**	Career best	°	League leader

=== WNBA ===
==== Regular season ====
WNBA regular season statistics
Year	Team	GP	GS	MPG	FG%	3P%	FT%	RPG	APG	SPG	BPG	TO	PPG
2026	Indiana	39	0	10.9	.408	.234	.692	1.7	1.2	.4	.2	.7	3.1
**Career**	1 year, 1 team	39	0	10.9	.408	.234	.692	1.7	1.2	.4	.2	.7	3.1

==== Playoffs ====
WNBA playoff statistics
Year	Team	GP	GS	MPG	FG%	3P%	FT%	RPG	APG	SPG	BPG	TO	PPG
2026	Indiana	3	0	20.7	.588	.200	1.000	2.0	.3	1.0	.3	.7	7.3
**Career**	1 year, 1 team	3	0	20.7	.588	.200	1.000	2.0	.3	1.0	.3	.7	7.3

=== College ===
Year	Team	GP	GS	MPG	FG%	3P%	FT%	RPG	APG	SPG	BPG	TO	PPG
2021–22	South Carolina	Did not play due to injury											
2022–23	South Carolina	36	3	18.7	.438	.241	.654	2.6	3.4	1.1	.4	1.4	4.2
2023–24	South Carolina	37	35	27.9	.443	.350	.612	**5.2**	4.8	**2.1**	.2	1.6	8.1
2024–25	South Carolina	39	39	24.2	.350	.295	.682	4.5	2.8	1.4	**.6**	**1.0**	4.9
2025–26	South Carolina	**40**	**40**	**28.7**	**.486**	**.398**	**.880**	4.0	**5.1**	1.5	**.6**	1.6	**9.9**
**Career**		154	117	24.7	.423	.332	.701	4.0	4.0	1.5	.4	1.4	6.7
Statistics retrieved from Sports-Reference.

== Personal life ==
In 2023 and 2024, Johnson attended Kelsey Plum's Dawg Class, an Under Armour-sponsored camp to help top women college athletes transition from collegiate to professional basketball. Raven Johnson is in a relationship with Nick Emmanwori, a key starting safety/hybrid defender for the 2026 Super Bowl champion Seattle Seahawks.
