= Ava Heiden =

American basketball player

No. 5 – Iowa Hawkeyes
- Position: Center
- League: Big Ten Conference

Personal information
- Listed height: 6 ft 4 in (1.93 m)

Career information
- High school: Sherwood (Sherwood, Oregon)
- College: Iowa (2024–present)

Career highlights
- First-team All-Big Ten (2026)

Ava Heiden is an American college basketball player for the Iowa Hawkeyes of the Big Ten Conference.

== Early life and high school career ==
Heiden is the daughter of Randy and Kelly Heiden. She attended Sherwood High School and was a four-star prospect. She averaged 17.2 points, 11.3 rebounds, 4.0 steals, 3.0 assists, and 2.8 blocks per game. In October 2022, she committed to play college basketball at Iowa, becoming the first Oregonian to play for Iowa.

== College career ==
During the 2024–25 season, Heiden averaged 5.0 points and 2.6 rebounds in 28 games. During the second round of the 2025 Big Ten tournament against Michigan State, she came off the bench and scored all of her then career-high 11 points in the final 12:44 of the game. The game was tied when she entered, and Iowa won 74–61. During the first round of the 2025 NCAA Division I women's basketball tournament against Murray State, she scored a then career-high 15 points, and seven rebounds in 17 minutes. She became the fifth Hawkeye freshman since 2009 to score 15 or more points in an NCAA tournament game.

She was named a starter for the 2025–26 season in her sophomore year. During the season opening game against Southern on November 3, 2025, she scored a career-high 21 points and 14 rebounds, for her first career double-double. On November 20, 2025, during the WBCA Showcase against Baylor, she scored 18 points and 11 rebounds for her third double-double of the season. On November 22, 2025, against Miami (FL), she scored 20 points on 9-for-11 shooting with six rebounds, two steals and a block, to win the WBCA Showcase Championship. She was subsequently named the Big Ten Player of the Week, and USBWA National Player of the Week. On January 22, 2026, against Maryland, she scored game-high 20 points and eight rebounds. On January 25, 2026, against Ohio State, she scored 18 points, eight rebounds, and a career-high four steals. She was subsequently named the Big Ten Player of the Week for the second time this season.
