= 2025–26 Penn State Lady Lions basketball team =

Intercollegiate basketball season

2025–26 Penn State Lady Lions basketball
- Conference: Big Ten Conference
- Record: 11–18 (4–14 Big Ten)
- Head coach: Carolyn Kieger (7th season)
- Assistant coaches: Shenise Johnson; Sean Bair; Bob Dunn; Adrienne Motley
- Home arena: Bryce Jordan Center

2025–26 Big Ten women's basketball standings
	Conf.				Overall
Team	W		L	PCT	W		L	PCT
No. 1 UCLA †	18	–	0	1.000	37	–	1	.974
No. 7 Michigan	15	–	3	.833	28	–	7	.800
No. 16 Iowa	15	–	3	.833	27	–	7	.794
No. 17 Ohio State	13	–	5	.722	27	–	8	.771
No. 15 Minnesota	13	–	5	.722	24	–	9	.727
No. 20 Maryland	11	–	7	.611	24	–	9	.727
No. 22 Michigan State	11	–	7	.611	23	–	9	.719
No. 25 Washington	10	–	8	.556	22	–	11	.667
USC	9	–	9	.500	18	–	14	.563
Illinois	9	–	9	.500	22	–	12	.647
Oregon	8	–	10	.444	23	–	13	.639
Nebraska	7	–	11	.389	19	–	13	.594
Indiana	6	–	12	.333	18	–	14	.563
Purdue	5	–	13	.278	13	–	17	.433
Wisconsin	5	–	13	.278	16	–	18	.471
Penn State	4	–	14	.222	11	–	18	.379
Northwestern	2	–	16	.111	8	–	21	.276
Rutgers	1	–	17	.056	9	–	20	.310
† 2026 Big Ten tournament winner Rankings from AP poll

The 2025–26 Penn State Lady Lions basketball team represents Pennsylvania State University during the 2025–26 NCAA Division I women's basketball season. The Lady Lions are led by seventh-year head coach Carolyn Kieger and played their home games at the Bryce Jordan Center in State College, Pennsylvania as members of the Big Ten Conference.

== Previous season ==
The Lady Lions finished the 2024–25 season 10–19, 1–17 in Big Ten play to finish in last place. They failed to qualify for the Big Ten women's tournament.

== Offseason ==
=== Departures ===
Penn State departures
Name	Num	Pos.	Height	Year	Hometown	Reason for departure
Gabby Elliott	0	G	5'10"	Graduate Student	Detroit, MI	Transferred to Arizona State
Cam Rust	1	F	6'1"	Freshman	Wakefield, RI	Transferred to Seton Hall
Tamera Johnson	5	F	5'11"	Senior	Lafayette, LA	Graduated
Grace Hall	7	F	6'2"	(redshirt) Junior	Homewood, IL	Transferred to SMU
Ariana Williams	11	F	6'2"	Freshman	Chicago, IL	Transferred to IU Indy
Jayla Oden	12	G	5'9"	Senior	Baltimore, MD	Graduated
Talayah Walker	20	G	5'10"	Freshman	Odenton, MD	Transferred to Georgia Tech
Alli Campbell	22	G	6'0"	(redshirt) Senior	Altoona, PA	Transferred to Fairfield
Jill Jekot	24	G	5'11"	Freshman	Enola, PA	Transferred to Saint Joseph's

=== Incoming transfers ===
Penn State incoming transfers
Name	Num	Pos.	Height	Year	Hometown	Previous School
Maggie Mendelson	4	C	6'5"	Senior	North Ogden, UT	Walk-on; Penn State volleyball
Amiya Evans	14	F	6'2"	Senior	Penscaola, FL	Georgia
Kiyomi McMiller	23	G	5'8"	Sophomore	Silver Spring, MD	Rutgers

==== Recruiting ====
There was no recruiting class of 2025.

== Roster ==
2025–26 Penn State Nittany Lions women's basketball team
Players
Coaches

Pos.	#	Name	Height	Year	Previous school	Hometown
G	2	Shaelyn Steele	5 ft 6 in (1.68 m)	So	Russell	Ashland, KY
G	3	Moriah Murray	5 ft 8 in (1.73 m)	RS Jr	Drexel	Dunmore, PA
C	4	Maggie Mendelson (W)	6 ft 5 in (1.96 m)	Sr	Nebraska	North Ogden, UT
G	7	Viktoria Ranisavljevic	5 ft 7 in (1.7 m)	Fr		Switzerland
G	8	Nyla McFadden	6 ft 0 in (1.83 m)	Fr	St. Thomas Aquinas	Fort Lauderdale, FL
G	10	Vitoria Santana	5 ft 8 in (1.73 m)	Sr	Eastern Arizona College	São Paulo, Brazil
F	14	Amiya Evans	6 ft 2 in (1.88 m)	Sr	Georgia	Pensacola, FL
G	19	Tea Cleante	5 ft 9 in (1.75 m)	Fr		France
G	23	Kiyomi McMiller	5 ft 8 in (1.73 m)	So	Rutgers	Silver Spring, MD
G	24	Shayla Smith	5 ft 9 in (1.75 m)	Fr	Universal Audenried Charter	Philadelphia, PA
F	25	Rachael Okokoh	6 ft 4 in (1.93 m)	Fr	Capital Courts Academy	Montreal, QC
C	44	Gracie Merkle	6 ft 6 in (1.98 m)	RS Jr	Bellarmine	Mount Washington, KY

Head coach

- Carolyn Kieger (Marquette)

Assistant coach(es)

- Shenise Johnson (Miami (FL))
- Sean Bair (Dickinson College)
- Bob Dunn (Dayton)
- Adrienne Motley (Miami (FL))

Legend

- (C) Team captain
- (S) Suspended
- (I) Ineligible
- (W) Walk-on
- Injured
- Current redshirt

Roster

== Schedule and results ==
Date time, TV	Rank^{#}	Opponent^{#}	Result	Record	High points	High rebounds	High assists	Site (attendance) city, state
Exhibition
October 19, 2025*; 1:00 p.m.		California (PA)						Bryce Jordan Center; State College, PA
Regular season
November 3, 2025*; 5:00 p.m., B1G+		Bucknell	W 83–55	1–0	24 – Tied	7 – Evans	7 – McMiller	Rec Hall (1,446); State College, PA
November 7, 2025*; 6:00 p.m., B1G+		Cincinnati	W 82–77	2–0	20 – McMiller	12 – Merkle	7 – McMiller	Rec Hall (1,609); State College, PA
November 12, 2025*; 11:30 a.m., B1G+		Coppin State	W 90–62	3–0	21 – McMiller	9 – McMiller	4 – Tied	Rec Hall (1,816); State College, PA
November 16, 2025*; 2:00 p.m., ESPN+		at Saint Joseph's	W 89–77	4–0	25 – Merkle	11 – Merkle	6 – Murray	Hagan Arena (1,522); Philadelphia, PA
November 22, 2025*; 1:00 p.m.		vs. Princeton; Battle 4 Atlantis	L 93–100	4–1	39 – Merkle	7 – Merkle	8 – McMiller	Imperial Arena (218); Paradise Island, Bahamas
November 24, 2025*; 12:00 p.m.		vs. San Diego State; Battle 4 Atlantis	W 83–67	5–1	26 – Merkle	12 – Merkle	4 – McMiller	Imperial Arena (367); Paradise Island, Bahamas
November 30, 2025*; 1:00 p.m., B1G+		Yale	W 82–64	6–1	19 – McMiller	8 – Merkle	6 – McMiller	Rec Hall (1,461); State College, PA
December 6, 2025; 1:00 p.m., B1G+		Nebraska	L 83–101	6–2 (0–1)	23 – Merkle	6 – McMiller	5 – McMiller	Bryce Jordan Center (1,619); State College, PA
December 9, 2025*; 7:00 p.m., BTN		Arizona State	L 60–74	6–3	17 – Merkle	6 – Tied	3 – Tied	Bryce Jordan Center (1,590); State College, PA
December 14, 2025*; 3:30 p.m., ESPN		at No. 3 South Carolina	L 55–95	6–4	22 – McMiller	9 – Tied	3 – McMiller	Colonial Life Arena (15,601); Columbia, SC
December 20, 2025*; 3:30 p.m.		vs. VCU; 4 Tha Culture Holiday Classic	W 78–66	7–4	18 – Murray	12 – Merkle	8 – Cleante	Henrico Sports & Events Center (553); Henrico, VA
December 21, 2025*; 2:30 p.m.		vs. Richmond; 4 Tha Culture Holiday Classic	L 54–70	7–5	15 – Merkle	6 – Tied	3 – Tied	Henrico Sports & Events Center (703); Henrico, VA
December 28, 2025; 4:00 p.m., BTN		at No. 14 Iowa	L 76–99	7–6 (0–2)	21 – Cleante	11 – Merkle	4 – Tied	Carver–Hawkeye Arena (14,998); Iowa, City, IA
December 31, 2025; 2:00 p.m., Peacock		No. 4 UCLA	L 61–97	7–7 (0–3)	15 – Merkle	7 – Smith	7 – Cleante	Rec Hall (2,189); State College, PA
January 4, 2026; 4:00 p.m., BTN		at Wisconsin	L 73–74	7–8 (0–4)	36 – McMiller	12 – Evans	3 – Cleante	Kohl Center (3,615); Madison, WI
January 8, 2026; 6:00 p.m., B1G+		No. 9 Michigan	L 65–105	7–9 (0–5)	18 – Merkle	7 – Merkle	7 – McMiller	Rec Hall (1,468); State College, PA
January 11, 2026; 3:00 p.m., BTN		Illinois	L 76–92	7–10 (0–6)	24 – Merkle	7 – Merkle	7 – McMiller	Bryce Jordan Center (1,945); State College, PA
January 14, 2025; 6:30 p.m., B1G+		at No. 14 Ohio State	L 84–108	7–11 (0–7)	25 – Murray	11 – Merkle	7 – McMiller	Value City Arena (5,884); Columbus, OH
January 18, 2026; 1:00 p.m., B1G+		Rutgers	L 72–76	7–12 (0–8)	27 – McMiller	11 – McMiller	5 – Tied	Rec Hall (1,838); State College, PA
January 21, 2026; 9:00 p.m., B1G+		at No. 25 Washington	L 65–81	7–13 (0–9)	19 – Merkle	8 – Tied	4 – Tied	Alaska Airlines Arena (2,096); Seattle, WA
January 24, 2026; 5:00 p.m., B1G+		at Oregon	L 59–89	7–14 (0–10)	15 – Tied	7 – Mendelson	4 – McMiller	Matthew Knight Arena (6,106); Eugene, OR
January 28, 2026; 6:00 p.m., B1G+		Minnesota	L 66–87	7–15 (0–11)	23 – McMiller	8 – Mendelson	3 – McMiller	Rec Hall (1,546); State College, PA
February 4, 2026; 7:00 p.m., B1G+		at Purdue	W 85–82 ^{OT}	8–15 (1–11)	30 – McMiller	20 – Merkle	9 – McMiller	Mackey Arena (3,712); West Lafayette, IN
February 7, 2026; 1:00 p.m., B1G+		No. 12 Michigan State	L 70–81	8–16 (1–12)	37 – McMiller	8 – McMiller	4 – Ranisavljevic	Rec Hall (2,011); State College, PA
February 12, 2026; 7:00 p.m., Peacock		at No. 20 Maryland	L 62–81	8–17 (1–13)	30 – McMiller	7 – Merkle	4 – Cleante	Xfinity Center (7,015); College Park, MD
February 15, 2026; 4:00 p.m., BTN		Northwestern	W 81–71	9–17 (2–13)	32 – McMiller	12 – McMiller	4 – Tied	Rec Hall (3,074); State College, PA
February 21, 2026; 4:00 p.m., BTN		at Rutgers	W 87–78	10–17 (3–13)	37 – McMiller	6 – Merkle	8 – McMiller	Jersey Mike's Arena (3,218); Piscataway, NJ
February 25, 2026; 6:00 p.m., B1G+		USC	W 85–82	11–17 (4–13)	40 – McMiller	9 – McFadden	6 – McMiller	Rec Hall (1,650); State College, PA
February 28, 2026; 2:00 p.m., B1G+		at Indiana	L 59–93	11–18 (4–14)	22 – Merkle	10 – Merkle	4 – Merkle	Simon Skjodt Assembly Hall (8,447); Bloomington, IN
*Non-conference game. ^{#}Rankings from AP poll. (#) Tournament seedings in parentheses. All times are in Eastern.

== Rankings ==
Ranking movements
	Week																				
Poll	Pre	1	2	3	4	5	6	7	8	9	10	11	12	13	14	15	16	17	18	19	Final
AP																					
Coaches																					

== See also ==
- 2025–26 Penn State Nittany Lions basketball team
