= 2025–26 Washington Huskies women's basketball team =

American college basketball season

2025–26 Washington Huskies women's basketball

NCAA tournament, Second Round
- Conference: Big Ten Conference

Ranking
- AP: No. 25
- Record: 22–11 (10–8 Big Ten)
- Head coach: Tina Langley (5th season)
- Associate head coach: Latara King; David Adkins
- Assistant coaches: Aleah Goodman; Lauren Schwartz
- Home arena: Alaska Airlines Arena

2025–26 Big Ten women's basketball standings
	Conf.				Overall
Team	W		L	PCT	W		L	PCT
No. 1 UCLA †	18	–	0	1.000	37	–	1	.974
No. 7 Michigan	15	–	3	.833	28	–	7	.800
No. 16 Iowa	15	–	3	.833	27	–	7	.794
No. 17 Ohio State	13	–	5	.722	27	–	8	.771
No. 15 Minnesota	13	–	5	.722	24	–	9	.727
No. 20 Maryland	11	–	7	.611	24	–	9	.727
No. 22 Michigan State	11	–	7	.611	23	–	9	.719
No. 25 Washington	10	–	8	.556	22	–	11	.667
USC	9	–	9	.500	18	–	14	.563
Illinois	9	–	9	.500	22	–	12	.647
Oregon	8	–	10	.444	23	–	13	.639
Nebraska	7	–	11	.389	19	–	13	.594
Indiana	6	–	12	.333	18	–	14	.563
Purdue	5	–	13	.278	13	–	17	.433
Wisconsin	5	–	13	.278	16	–	18	.471
Penn State	4	–	14	.222	11	–	18	.379
Northwestern	2	–	16	.111	8	–	21	.276
Rutgers	1	–	17	.056	9	–	20	.310
† 2026 Big Ten tournament winner Rankings from AP poll

The 2025–26 Washington Huskies women's basketball team represents the University of Washington during the 2025–26 NCAA Division I women's basketball season. The Huskies, led by fifth-year head coach Tina Langley, played their home games at Alaska Airlines Arena at Hec Edmundson Pavilion in Seattle, Washington as members of the Big Ten Conference.

== Previous season ==
The Huskies finished the 2024–25 season 19–14, 9–9 in Big Ten play to finish in twelfth place. As the No. 12 seed in the Big Ten tournament, they defeated Minnesota in the first round before losing to Michigan in the second round. They received an at-large bid to the NCAA tournament, where they lost in the first four to Columbia.

== Offseason ==
=== Departures ===
Washington departures
Name	Num	Pos.	Height	Year	Hometown	Reason for departure
Dalayah Daniels	14	F	6'4"	Graduate student	Seattle, WA	Graduated/2025 WNBA draft; selected 24th overall by Minnesota Lynx
Brenna McDonald	20	F	6'3"	Graduate student	Natick, MA	Graduated
Tayra Eke	32	C	6'3"	Senior	Madrid, Spain	Graduated

=== Incoming ===
Washington incoming transfers
Name	Num	Pos.	Height	Year	Hometown	Previous school
Avery Howell	2	G	6'0"	Sophomore	Boise, ID	USC
Yulia Grabovskaia	55	C	6'5"	Senior	Rostov-on-Don, Russia	Michigan

=== Recruiting classes ===
==== 2025 recruiting class ====
College recruiting
Name	Hometown	School	Height	Weight	Commit date
Brynn McGaughy; F	Spokane, WA	Central Valley High School	6 ft 2 in (1.88 m)	N/A	
Brynn McGaughy; F	Recruit ratings: ESPN: (97)				
Nina Cain; W	Sacramento, CA	C. K. McClatchy High School	6 ft 1 in (1.85 m)	N/A	
Nina Cain; W	Recruit ratings: ESPN: (92)				
Overall recruit ranking:
Note: In many cases, Scout, Rivals, 247Sports, On3, and ESPN may conflict in their listings of height and weight.; In these cases, the average was taken. ESPN grades are on a 100-point scale.; Sources: "2025 Player Commits". ESPN. Archived from the original on September 28, 2024.

==== 2026 recruiting class ====
College recruiting (2026)
Name	Hometown	School	Height	Weight	Commit date
Amayah Garcia; G	Fort Worth, TX	Faith Family Academy	5 ft 11 in (1.80 m)	N/A	
Amayah Garcia; G	Recruit ratings: ESPN: (94)				
Overall recruit ranking:
Note: In many cases, Scout, Rivals, 247Sports, On3, and ESPN may conflict in their listings of height and weight.; In these cases, the average was taken. ESPN grades are on a 100-point scale.; Sources: "2026 Player Commits". ESPN. Archived from the original on March 27, 2027.

== Roster ==
2025–26 Washington Huskies women's basketball team
Players
Coaches

Pos.	#	Name	Height	Year	Previous school	Hometown
G	0	Sayvia Sellers	5 ft 7 in (1.7 m)	Jr	Anchorage Christian	Anchorage, AK
G	1	Hannah Stines	5 ft 11 in (1.8 m)	Sr	Orangewood Academy	La Mirada, CA
G	2	Avery Howell	6 ft 0 in (1.83 m)	So	Boise; USC	Boise, ID
G	3	Devin Coppinger	5 ft 10 in (1.78 m)	So	Nooksack Valley	Everson, WA
G	5	Teagan Brown	5 ft 10 in (1.78 m)	Sr	Oak Ridge	Sacramento, CA
F	8	Daniella McLean	6 ft 3 in (1.91 m)	Fr	Darrow School	Cobourg, ON
G	11	Chloe Briggs	5 ft 11 in (1.8 m)	Jr	Ontario Christian	Ontario, CA
F	21	Brynn McGaughy	6 ft 3 in (1.91 m)	Fr	Central Valley	Spokane, WA
F	22	Shayla Gillmer (W)	6 ft 1 in (1.85 m)	Sr	Ontario Christian	San Clemente, CA
F	23	Olivia Anderson (W)	6 ft 6 in (1.98 m)	Jr	Ellensburg	Ellensburg, WA
G	24	Elle Ladine	5 ft 11 in (1.8 m)	Sr	Pinewood	San Francisco, CA
F	25	Nina Cain	6 ft 2 in (1.88 m)	Fr	McClathy	Sacramento, CA
G	35	Sienna Harvey	5 ft 10 in (1.78 m)	Fr		Geelong, Australia
C	55	Yulia Grabovskaia	6 ft 5 in (1.96 m)	Sr	Rostov Regional School of Olympic Reserve; Michigan	Rostov-on-Don, Russia

Head coach

- Tina Langley (West Alabama)

Assistant coach(es)

- Latara King (Florida Memorial)
- David Adkins (Radford)
- Aleah Goodman (Oregon State)
- Lauren Schwartz (Washington)

Legend

- (C) Team captain
- (S) Suspended
- (I) Ineligible
- (W) Walk-on
- Injured
- Current redshirt

Roster

== Schedule and results ==
Date time, TV	Rank^{#}	Opponent^{#}	Result	Record	High points	High rebounds	High assists	Site (attendance) city, state
Regular season
November 3, 2025*; 5:00 p.m., B1G+		Seattle	W 90–43	1–0	21 – Sellers	6 – Cain	6 – Sellers	Alaska Airlines Arena (2,975); Seattle, WA
November 10, 2025*; 6:00 p.m., B1G+	No. 25	Montana	W 87–56	2–0	19 – Sellers	8 – Tied	5 – Sellers	Alaska Airlines Arena (1,918); Seattle, WA
November 15, 2025*; 1:00 p.m., ESPN+	No. 25	at Utah	W 72–61	3–0	30 – Sellers	8 – Stines	4 – Howell	Jon M. Huntsman Center (2,843); Salt Lake City, UT
November 19, 2025*; 6:00 p.m., B1G+	No. 25	Fresno State	W 61–43	4–0	14 – Tied	6 – Howell	8 – Sellers	Alaska Airlines Arena (2,167); Seattle, WA
November 23, 2025*; 2:00 p.m., B1G+	No. 25	Vermont	W 71–39	5–0	22 – Sellers	12 – Howell	4 – Sellers	Alaska Airlines Arena (1,667); Seattle, WA
November 25, 2025*; 6:00 p.m., B1G+	No. 22	Southern	W 66–40	6–0	18 – Howell	6 – Tied	3 – Tied	Alaska Airlines Arena (2,000); Seattle, WA
November 28, 2025*; 7:00 p.m., B1G+	No. 22	UC San Diego	W 67–50	7–0	17 – Sellers	8 – Tied	5 – Harvey	Alaska Airlines Arena (2,530); Seattle, WA
December 1, 2025*; 6:00 p.m., B1G+	No. 21	San Jose State	W 80–54	8–0	29 – Sellers	8 – McGaughy	3 – Tied	Alaska Airlines Arena (1,960); Seattle, WA
December 7, 2025; 5:00 p.m., BTN	No. 21	at No. 16 USC	L 50–59	8–1 (0–1)	20 – Sellers	13 – Howell	4 – Stines	Galen Center (6,137); Los Angeles, CA
December 13, 2025*; 12:00 p.m., B1G+	No. 20	Green Bay	W 79–74	9–1	30 – Sellers	12 – Howell	6 – Grabovskaia	Alaska Airlines Arena (2,603); Seattle, WA
December 19, 2025*; 7:00 p.m., ACCNX/ESPN+	No. 22	at Stanford	L 62–67	9–2	13 – Tied	9 – McGaughy	3 – Sellers	Maples Pavilion (2,533); Stanford, CA
December 21, 2025*; 1:00 p.m., ESPN+	No. 22	at Pacific	W 90–50	10–2	22 – Harvey	8 – Ladine	4 – Ladine	Alex G. Spanos Center (569); Stockton, CA
December 29, 2025; 5:00 p.m., B1G+		Northwestern	W 94–73	11–2 (1–1)	23 – Tied	8 – McGaughy	4 – Tied	Alaska Airlines Arena (4,092); Seattle, WA
January 1, 2026; 3:00 p.m., BTN		No. 6 Michigan	W 64–52	12–2 (2–1)	22 – Howell	16 – Howell	5 – Stines	Alaska Airlines Arena (5,229); Seattle, WA
January 8, 2026; 6:00 p.m., B1G+	No. 23	No. 15 Michigan State	L 67–82	12–3 (2–2)	15 – Ladine	4 – Tied	4 – Sellers	Alaska Airlines Arena (2,858); Seattle, WA
January 11, 2026; 11:00 a.m., B1G+	No. 23	at Purdue	L 72–78 ^{OT}	12–4 (2–3)	23 – Sellers	8 – Tied	4 – McGaughy	Mackey Arena (6,005); West Lafayette, IN
January 14, 2026; 4:00 p.m., B1G+		at Indiana	W 82–63	13–4 (3–3)	19 – Ladine	6 – Tied	6 – Stines	Simon Skjodt Assembly Hall (7,352); Bloomington, IN
January 18, 2026; 3:00 p.m., BTN		Minnesota	W 67–54	14–4 (4–3)	23 – Sellers	12 – Howell	4 – Tied	Alaska Airlines Arena (3,509); Seattle, WA
January 21, 2026; 6:00 p.m., B1G+	No. 25	Penn State	W 81–65	15–4 (5–3)	24 – Sellers	12 – Howell	3 – Sellers	Alaska Airlines Arena (2,096); Seattle, WA
January 26, 2026; 12:00 p.m., B1G+	No. 25	at Rutgers	W 76–48	16–4 (6–3)	17 – McGaughy	17 – Grabovskaia	6 – Sellers	Jersey Mike's Arena (3,323); Piscataway, NJ
January 28, 2026; 4:00 p.m., B1G+	No. 25	at No. 16 Maryland	W 83–80 ^{2OT}	17–4 (7–3)	38 – Sellers	11 – Tied	6 – Sellers	Xfinity Center (6,425); College Park, MD
February 1, 2026; 3:00 p.m., FS1	No. 25	Illinois	L 66–75	17–5 (7–4)	17 – Tied	7 – Howell	4 – Sellers	Alaska Airlines Arena (4,691); Seattle, WA
February 5, 2026; 6:00 p.m., Peacock	No. 24	No. 9 Ohio State	L 60–70	17–6 (7–5)	26 – Sellers	8 – Ladine	4 – Ladine	Alaska Airlines Arena (3,394); Seattle, WA
February 8, 2026; 12:00 p.m., B1G+	No. 24	at Wisconsin	W 91–86 ^{OT}	18–6 (8–5)	34 – Howell	14 – Howell	5 – Sellers	Kohl Center (3,630); Madison, WI
February 11, 2026; 4:30 p.m., B1G+	No. 25	at No. 15 Iowa	L 56–65	18–7 (8–6)	19 – Ladine	10 – Howell	3 – Sellers	Carver–Hawkeye Arena (14,998); Iowa City, IA
February 15, 2026; 5:00 p.m., BTN	No. 25	Oregon	W 51–43	19–7 (9–6)	17 – Sellers	9 – Howell	3 – Tied	Alaska Airlines Arena (5,134); Seattle, WA
February 19, 2026; 7:00 p.m., BTN		at No. 2 UCLA	L 67–82	19–8 (9–7)	19 – McGaughy	7 – Howell	7 – Sellers	Pauley Pavilion (3,421); Los Angeles, CA
February 22, 2026; 12:00 p.m., BTN		Nebraska	L 65–66	19–9 (9–8)	14 – Tied	10 – Howell	7 – Stines	Alaska Airlines Arena (6,212); Seattle, WA
March 1, 2026; 2:00 p.m., B1G+		at Oregon	W 70–69	20–9 (10–8)	29 – Sellers	8 – Howell	5 – Sellers	Matthew Knight Arena (5,865); Eugene, OR
Big Ten Women's Tournament
March 5, 2026; 9:00 a.m., BTN	(8)	vs. (9) USC; Second Round	W 76–64	21–9	25 – Ladine	10 – Grabovskaia	4 – Tied	Gainbridge Fieldhouse; Indianapolis, IN
March 6, 2026; 9:00 a.m., BTN	(8)	vs. (1) No. 2 UCLA; Quarterfinals	L 60–78	21–10	18 – Howell	7 – Ladine	8 – Sellers	Gainbridge Fieldhouse (5,146); Indianapolis, IN
NCAA Women's Tournament
March 20, 2026*; 11:30 a.m., ESPNews	(6 S4)	vs. (11 S4) South Dakota State; First Round	W 72–54	22–10	30 – Howell	9 – Howell	10 – Sellers	Schollmaier Arena (3,934); Fort Worth, TX
March 22, 2026*; 7:00 p.m., ESPN	(6 S4)	at (3 S4) No. 14 TCU; Second Round	L 59–62 ^{OT}	22–11	18 – Sellers	8 – Howell	5 – Sellers	Schollmaier Arena (4,822); Fort Worth, TX
*Non-conference game. ^{#}Rankings from AP Poll. (#) Tournament seedings in parentheses. S4=Sacramento 4. All times are in Pacific Time.

== Rankings ==
Ranking movements Legend: ██ Increase in ranking ██ Decrease in ranking — = Not ranked RV = Received votes
	Week																				
Poll	Pre	1	2	3	4	5	6	7	8	9	10	11	12	13	14	15	16	17	18	19	Final
AP	RV	25	25	22	21	20	22	RV	RV*	23	RV	25	25	24	25	RV	RV	RV	—	—	25
Coaches	RV	RV	RV	23	22	23	22	RV	RV	23	RV	25	24	25	RV	RV	RV	RV	—	—	RV

*AP did not release a week 8 poll.

== See also ==
- 2025–26 Washington Huskies men's basketball team
