= 2025–26 Nebraska Cornhuskers women's basketball team =

American college basketball season

2025–26 Nebraska Cornhuskers women's basketball

Emerald Coast Classic Beach Bracket champions

NCAA tournament, First Round
- Conference: Big Ten Conference
- Record: 19–13 (7–11 Big Ten)
- Head coach: Amy Williams (10th season)
- Assistant coaches: Julian Assibey; Tandem Mays; Jessica Keller; Taylor Edwards
- Home arena: Pinnacle Bank Arena

2025–26 Big Ten women's basketball standings
	Conf.				Overall
Team	W		L	PCT	W		L	PCT
No. 1 UCLA †	18	–	0	1.000	37	–	1	.974
No. 7 Michigan	15	–	3	.833	28	–	7	.800
No. 16 Iowa	15	–	3	.833	27	–	7	.794
No. 17 Ohio State	13	–	5	.722	27	–	8	.771
No. 15 Minnesota	13	–	5	.722	24	–	9	.727
No. 20 Maryland	11	–	7	.611	24	–	9	.727
No. 22 Michigan State	11	–	7	.611	23	–	9	.719
No. 25 Washington	10	–	8	.556	22	–	11	.667
USC	9	–	9	.500	18	–	14	.563
Illinois	9	–	9	.500	22	–	12	.647
Oregon	8	–	10	.444	23	–	13	.639
Nebraska	7	–	11	.389	19	–	13	.594
Indiana	6	–	12	.333	18	–	14	.563
Purdue	5	–	13	.278	13	–	17	.433
Wisconsin	5	–	13	.278	16	–	18	.471
Penn State	4	–	14	.222	11	–	18	.379
Northwestern	2	–	16	.111	8	–	21	.276
Rutgers	1	–	17	.056	9	–	20	.310
† 2026 Big Ten tournament winner Rankings from AP poll

The 2025–26 Nebraska Cornhuskers women's basketball team represents the University of Nebraska–Lincoln during the 2025–26 NCAA Division I women's basketball season. The Cornhuskers are led by head coach Amy Williams in her tenth year, and played their home games at the Pinnacle Bank Arena in Lincoln, Nebraska as a member of the Big Ten Conference.

== Previous season ==
The Cornhuskers finished the 2024–25 season with a 21–12 record, including 10–8 in Big Ten play to finish in tenth place in the conference. They received an at-large bid to the 2025 NCAA Division I Women's Basketball Tournament, where they lost in the first round to Louisville.

== Offseason ==
=== Departures ===
Nebraska departures
Name	Number	Pos.	Height	Year	Hometown	Reason for Departure
Alberte Rimdal	5	G	5'9"	Senior	Køge, Denmark	Graduated
Kendall Moriarty	15	G	6'1"	Senior	Wheaton, IL	Graduated
Kendall Coley	32	G/F	6'2"	Senior	Plymouth, MN	Graduated
Alexis Markowski	44	C	6'3"	Senior	Lincoln, NE	Graduated

=== Incoming transfers ===
Nebraska incoming transfers
Name	Pos.	Height	Year	Hometown	Previous School
Emily Fischer	G/F	6'0"	Junior	Libertyville, IL	Maryland
Claire Johnson	G	5'9"	Junior	Paducah, KY	Samford
Eliza Maupin	F	6'3"	Senior	Webster Groves, MO	Kansas State
Hailey Weaver	G	6'0"	(redshirt) Senior	Solon, OH	Northwestern

== Recruiting ==
=== 2025 recruiting class ===
College recruiting information
Name	Hometown	School	Height	Weight	Commit date
Alanna Neale; G	Los Angeles, CA	Ontario Christian High School	5 ft 11 in (1.80 m)	N/A	Feb 28, 2025
Alanna Neale; G	Recruit ratings: 247Sports:				
Overall recruit ranking:
Note: In many cases, Scout, Rivals, 247Sports, On3, and ESPN may conflict in their listings of height and weight.; In these cases, the average was taken. ESPN grades are on a 100-point scale.; Sources: "2025 Player Commits". ESPN. Archived from the original on September 5, 2025.

=== 2026 recruiting class ===
College recruiting information (2026)
Name	Hometown	School	Height	Weight	Commit date
Ashlyn Koupal; F	Wagner, SD	Wagner Community School	6 ft 3 in (1.91 m)	N/A	Aug 9, 2025
Ashlyn Koupal; F	Recruit ratings: 247Sports: ESPN: (95)				
Ava Miles; G	Kansas City, MO	Staley High School	6 ft 0 in (1.83 m)	N/A	Jul 7, 2025
Ava Miles; G	Recruit ratings: 247Sports: ESPN: (91)				
Maddi Stewart; G	Claremore, OK	Lincoln Christian High School	5 ft 9 in (1.75 m)	N/A	Aug 8, 2025
Maddi Stewart; G	Recruit ratings: 247Sports: ESPN: (91)				
Overall recruit ranking: 247Sports: 7 ESPN: 15
Note: In many cases, Scout, Rivals, 247Sports, On3, and ESPN may conflict in their listings of height and weight.; In these cases, the average was taken. ESPN grades are on a 100-point scale.; Sources: "2026 Player Commits". ESPN. Archived from the original on September 5, 2025.

== Roster ==
2025–26 Nebraska Cornhuskers women's basketball team
Players
Coaches

Pos.	#	Name	Height	Year	Previous school	Hometown
G	00	Alanna Neale	5 ft 10 in (1.78 m)	Fr	Ontario Christian	Los Angeles, CA
G	1	Hailey Weaver	6 ft 0 in (1.83 m)	RS Sr	Northwestern	Solon, OH
G	2	Logan Nissley	6 ft 0 in (1.83 m)	Jr	Bismarck Century	Bismarck, ND
G	3	Allison Weidner	5 ft 10 in (1.78 m)	RS Sr	Humphrey St. Francis	Humphrey, NE
F/C	4	Petra Bozan	6 ft 3 in (1.91 m)	So	V. Gimnazija Vladimir Nazor	Split, Croatia
G	5	Claire Johnson	5 ft 9 in (1.75 m)	So	Samford	Paducah, KY
F	12	Jessica Petrie	6 ft 2 in (1.88 m)	So	Lake Ginninderra College	Gold Coast, Australia
G	14	Callin Hake	5 ft 8 in (1.73 m)	Sr	Chanhassen	Victoria, MN
G	15	Kennadi Williams	5 ft 4 in (1.63 m)	RS Fr	Lincoln Southwest	Lincoln, NE
F/C	21	Eliza Maupin	6 ft 3 in (1.91 m)	Sr	Kansas State	Webster Groves, MO
F	22	Natalie Potts	6 ft 2 in (1.88 m)	RS So	Incarnate Word Academy	O'Fallon, MO
G	23	Britt Prince	5 ft 11 in (1.8 m)	So	Elkhorn North	Omaha, NE
G/F	33	Amiah Hargrove	6 ft 2 in (1.88 m)	So	Christopher	Christopher, IL
G/F	34	Emily Fischer	6 ft 0 in (1.83 m)	Jr	Maryland	Libertyville, IL

Head coach

- Amy Williams (Nebraska)

Assistant coach(es)

- Julian Assibey (William Penn)
- Tandem Mays (Tulsa)
- Jessica Keller (Quincy)
- Taylor Edwards (Montana State Billings)

Legend

- (C) Team captain
- (S) Suspended
- (I) Ineligible
- (W) Walk-on
- Injured
- Current redshirt

Roster

== Schedule and results ==
Date time, TV	Rank^{#}	Opponent^{#}	Result	Record	High points	High rebounds	High assists	Site (attendance) city, state
Exhibition
October 23, 2025*; 8:00 p.m., B1G+		Mount Marty	W 104–40	n/a	26 – Hargrove	10 – Hargrove	10 – Prince	Pinnacle Bank Arena (4,005); Lincoln, NE
Regular season
November 3, 2025*; 12:00 p.m., B1G+		Northwestern State	W 103–46	1–0	21 – Johnson	7 – Petrie	3 – Tied	Pinnacle Bank Arena (8,004); Lincoln, NE
November 8, 2025*; 5:00 p.m., B1G+		Samford	W 80–46	2–0	23 – Prince	11 – Hargrove	7 – Hake	Pinnacle Bank Arena (4,670); Lincoln, NE
November 12, 2025*; 8:00 p.m., FS1		Creighton	W 84–50	3–0	18 – Prince	11 – Prince	4 – Hake	Pinnacle Bank Arena (5,110); Lincoln, NE
November 16, 2025*; 12:00 p.m., BTN		vs. North Dakota State	W 82–70	4–0	17 – Hargrove	7 – Hargrove	4 – Tied	Sanford Pentagon (1,685); Sioux Falls, SD
November 19, 2025*; 7:00 p.m., B1G+		Oral Roberts	W 103–58	5–0	30 – Prince	10 – Bozan	4 – Tied	Pinnacle Bank Arena (4,312); Lincoln, NE
November 24, 2025*; 5:00 p.m., FloCollege		vs. Purdue Fort Wayne; Emerald Coast Classic Beach Bracket semifinals	W 80–57	6–0	18 – Prince	6 – Hargrove	7 – Prince	Raider Arena (800); Niceville, FL
November 25, 2025*; 7:30 p.m., FloCollege		vs. Virginia; Emerald Coast Classic Beach Bracket championship	W 91–82	7–0	30 – Prince	8 – Hargrove	6 – Tied	Raider Arena (850); Niceville, FL
December 3, 2025*; 7:00 p.m., B1G+		Bradley	W 92–53	8–0	17 – Prince	10 – Petrie	7 – Nissley	Pinnacle Bank Arena (4,276); Lincoln, NE
December 6, 2025; 12:00 p.m., B1G+		at Penn State	W 101–83	9–0 (1–0)	26 – Hargrove	5 – Nissley	8 – Hake	Bryce Jordan Center (1,619); State College, PA
December 9, 2025*; 7:00 p.m., B1G+	No. 24	Omaha	W 87–35	10–0	17 – Hake	9 – Hargrove	6 – Tied	Pinnacle Bank Arena (4,318); Lincoln, NE
December 14, 2025*; 11:00 a.m., B1G+	No. 24	Illinois State	W 85–44	11–0	14 – Bozan	6 – Tied	6 – Prince	Pinnacle Bank Arena (4,943); Lincoln, NE
December 21, 2025*; 11:00 a.m., B1G+	No. 23	California Baptist	W 87–56	12–0	17 – Petrie	8 – Hargrove	5 – Hake	Pinnacle Bank Arena (5,391); Lincoln, NE
December 29, 2025; 2:00 p.m., B1G+	No. 20	No. 17 USC	L 66–74	12–1 (1–1)	18 – Prince	4 – Tied	7 – Prince	Pinnacle Bank Arena (6,285); Lincoln, NE
January 1, 2026; 1:00 p.m., BTN	No. 20	at No. 14 Iowa; Rivalry	L 76–86	12–2 (1–2)	27 – Prince	11 – Maupin	2 – Tied	Carver–Hawkeye Arena (14,988); Iowa, City, IA
January 4, 2026; 2:00 p.m., B1G+	No. 20	Purdue	W 78–62	13–2 (2–2)	17 – Prince	5 – Tied	3 – Nissley	Pinnacle Bank Arena (6,243); Lincoln, NE
January 8, 2026; 7:00 p.m., B1G+	No. 25	Indiana	W 78–73	14–2 (3–2)	20 – Prince	7 – Tied	7 – Prince	Pinnacle Bank Arena (4,480); Lincoln, NE
January 11, 2026; 6:00 p.m., BTN	No. 25	No. 4 UCLA	L 61–83	14–3 (3–3)	12 – Hargrove	5 – Petrie	5 – Prince	Pinnacle Bank Arena (6,110); Lincoln, NE
January 15, 2026; 6:00 p.m., BTN	No. 24	at No. 15 Michigan State	L 71–73	14–4 (3–4)	21 – Hargrove	4 – Tied	7 – Nissley	Breslin Center (4,273); East Lansing, MI
January 21, 2026; 6:30 p.m., B1G+	No. 24	at Wisconsin	L 60–63	14–5 (3–5)	15 – Hargrove	13 – Maupin	4 – Maupin	Kohl Center (3,549); Madison, WI
January 24, 2026; 1:00 p.m., BTN	No. 24	Illinois; Pack PBA	W 81–75	15–5 (4–5)	20 – Prince	6 – Petrie	4 – Tied	Pinnacle Bank Arena (7,683); Lincoln, NE
January 28, 2026; 7:00 p.m., B1G+		Northwestern	W 89–73	16–5 (5–5)	28 – Prince	11 – Hargrove	8 – Prince	Pinnacle Bank Arena (4,784); Lincoln, NE
February 1, 2026; 5:00 p.m., BTN		at No. 11 Ohio State	L 71–90	16–6 (5–6)	24 – Hargrove	6 – Tied	6 – Prince	Value City Arena (7,608); Columbus, OH
February 4, 2026; 6:00 p.m., B1G+		at No. 8 Michigan	L 76–88	16–7 (5–7)	16 – Prince	8 – Hargrove	4 – Tied	Crisler Center (3,039); Ann Arbor, MI
February 7, 2026; 1:00 p.m., BTN		No. 22 Maryland; Play4Kay - Pink Game	L 60–78	16–8 (5–8)	22 – Nissley	6 – Prince	5 – Hake	Pinnacle Bank Arena (6,113); Lincoln, NE
February 12, 2026; 7:00 p.m., BTN		at Minnesota	L 67–84	16–9 (5–9)	15 – Prince	7 – Prince	4 – Tied	Williams Arena (4,039); Minneapolis, MN
February 16, 2026; 11:00 a.m., FOX		No. 13 Iowa; Rivalry	L 67–80	16–10 (5–10)	13 – Prince	6 – Maupin	4 – Williams	Pinnacle Bank Arena (6,771); Lincoln, NE
February 19, 2026; 8:00 p.m., B1G+		at Oregon	L 76–80	16–11 (5–11)	18 – Prince	5 – Nissley	5 – Tied	Matthew Knight Arena (4,827); Eugene, OR
February 22, 2026; 2:00 p.m., BTN		at Washington	W 66–65	17–11 (6–11)	22 – Prince	6 – Prince	6 – Prince	Alaska Airlines Arena (6,212); Seattle, WA
February 28, 2026; 1:00 p.m., B1G+		Rutgers	W 93–52	18–11 (7–11)	18 – Hargrove	11 – Prince	8 – Prince	Pinnacle Bank Arena (5,853); Lincoln, NE
Big Ten women's tournament
March 4, 2026; 2:30 p.m., Peacock	(12)	vs. (13) Indiana; First Round	L 69–72	18–12	23 – Hargrove	10 – Petrie	8 – Prince	Gainbridge Fieldhouse; Indianapolis, IN
NCAA Tournament
March 18, 2026; 6:00 p.m., ESPN2	(11 S2)	vs. (11 S2) Richmond; First Four	W 75–56	19–12	22 – Prince	6 – Bozan	5 – Prince	Cameron Indoor Stadium (730); Durham, NC
March 20, 2026; 2:00 p.m., ESPN	(11 S2)	vs. (6 S2) No. 21 Baylor; First Round	L 62–67	19–13	27 – Prince	11 – Hargrove	6 – Williams	Cameron Indoor Stadium (3,455); Durham, NC
*Non-conference game. ^{#}Rankings from AP Poll. (#) Tournament seedings in parentheses. All times are in Central. Source:

== Rankings ==
Ranking movements Legend: ██ Increase in ranking ██ Decrease in ranking — = Not ranked RV = Received votes
	Week																				
Poll	Pre	1	2	3	4	5	6	7	8	9	10	11	12	13	14	15	16	17	18	19	Final
AP	RV	RV	RV	RV	RV	24	23	20	20*	25	24	24	RV	RV	—	—	—	—	—	—	
Coaches	RV	RV	RV	RV	RV	RV	25	24	25	RV	RV	RV	RV	RV	RV	RV	RV	—	—	—	

*AP did not release a week 8 poll.
