= 2025–26 Purdue Boilermakers women's basketball team =

American college basketball season

2025–26 Purdue Boilermakers women's basketball
- Conference: Big Ten Conference
- Record: 13–17 (5–13 Big Ten)
- Head coach: Katie Gearlds (5th season)
- Associate head coach: Kelly Komara; April Phillips
- Assistant coach: Michael Stephens
- Home arena: Mackey Arena

2025–26 Big Ten women's basketball standings
	Conf.				Overall
Team	W		L	PCT	W		L	PCT
No. 1 UCLA †	18	–	0	1.000	37	–	1	.974
No. 7 Michigan	15	–	3	.833	28	–	7	.800
No. 16 Iowa	15	–	3	.833	27	–	7	.794
No. 17 Ohio State	13	–	5	.722	27	–	8	.771
No. 15 Minnesota	13	–	5	.722	24	–	9	.727
No. 20 Maryland	11	–	7	.611	24	–	9	.727
No. 22 Michigan State	11	–	7	.611	23	–	9	.719
No. 25 Washington	10	–	8	.556	22	–	11	.667
USC	9	–	9	.500	18	–	14	.563
Illinois	9	–	9	.500	22	–	12	.647
Oregon	8	–	10	.444	23	–	13	.639
Nebraska	7	–	11	.389	19	–	13	.594
Indiana	6	–	12	.333	18	–	14	.563
Purdue	5	–	13	.278	13	–	17	.433
Wisconsin	5	–	13	.278	16	–	18	.471
Penn State	4	–	14	.222	11	–	18	.379
Northwestern	2	–	16	.111	8	–	21	.276
Rutgers	1	–	17	.056	9	–	20	.310
† 2026 Big Ten tournament winner Rankings from AP poll

The 2025–26 Purdue Boilermakers women's basketball team represented Purdue University during the 2025–26 NCAA Division I women's basketball season. The Boilermakers were led by fifth-year head coach Katie Gearlds and played their home games at Mackey Arena where they are a member of the Big Ten Conference.

== Previous season ==
The Boilermakers finished the 2024–25 season 10–19, 3–15 in Big Ten play to finish in a tie for 15th place. Due to tiebreaking rules, they failed to qualify for the Big Ten women's tournament.

== Offseason ==
=== Departures ===
Purdue Departures
Name	Num	Pos.	Height	Year	Hometown	Reason for Departure
Amiyah Reynolds	1	G	6'0"	Sophomore	South Bend, IN	Transferred to UT Arlington
Rashunda Jones	2	G	5'8"	Sophomore	South Bend, IN	Transferred to Michigan State
Jayla Smith	3	G	6'0"	Senior	Indianapolis, IN	Transferred to Missouri
Destini Lombard	4	G	5'9"	Graduate Student	New Iberia, LA	Graduated
Mahri Petree	7	G	6'0"	Graduate Student	Detroit, MI	Graduated
Jordyn Poole	10	G	5'7"	Freshman	Fort Wayne, IN	Transferred to Dayton
Mila Reynolds	15	F	6'3"	Junior	South Bend, IN	Transferred to UT Arlington
Sophie Swanson	31	G	5'10"	Sophomore	Barrington, IL	Transferred to Virginia Tech
Alaina Harper	32	F	6'3"	Junior	Hartland, WI	Retired from basketball due to injury
Reagan Bass	34	F	6'1"	Senior	Strongsville, OH	Graduated

=== Incoming transfers ===
Purdue incoming transfers
Name	Num	Pos.	Height	Year	Hometown	Previous School
Taylor Henderson	2	G	5'11"	(redshirt) Junior	Charlotte, NC	UNC Wilmington
Nya Smith	3	G	5'9"	Sophomore	Roswell, GA	UNC Greensboro
Taylor Feldman	5	G	5'8"	Senior	Tustin, CA	Northern Arizona
Saige Stahl	13	F	6'1"	Junior	Seymour, IN	Indiana State
Kiki Smith	23	G	5'7"	Junior	Topeka, KS	Arkansas
Tara Daye	44	G	5'10"	(redshirt) Junior	Newark, NJ	St. John's

=== 2025 recruiting class ===
College recruiting information
Name	Hometown	School	Height	Weight	Commit date
Avery Gordon; P	Brownsburg, IN	Brownsburg High School	6 ft 5 in (1.96 m)	N/A	
Avery Gordon; P	Recruit ratings: ESPN: (93)				
Overall recruit ranking:
Note: In many cases, Scout, Rivals, 247Sports, On3, and ESPN may conflict in their listings of height and weight.; In these cases, the average was taken. ESPN grades are on a 100-point scale.; Sources: "2025 Player Commits". ESPN. Archived from the original on September 9, 2025.

== Roster ==
2025–26 Purdue Boilermakers women's basketball team
Players
Coaches

Pos.	#	Name	Height	Year	Previous school	Hometown
G	2	Taylor Henderson	5 ft 11 in (1.8 m)	RS Jr	UNC Wilmington	Charlotte, North Carolina
G	3	Nya Smith	5 ft 9 in (1.75 m)	So	UNC Greensboro	Roswell, Georgia
G	5	Taylor Feldman	5 ft 8 in (1.73 m)	Sr	Northern Arizona	Tustin, California
G	8	Hila Karsh	5 ft 8 in (1.73 m)	Fr		Rishon LeZion, Israel
G	11	McKenna Layden	6 ft 2 in (1.88 m)	Jr	Northwestern High School	Kokomo, Indiana
F	13	Saige Stahl	6 ft 1 in (1.85 m)	Jr	Indiana State	Seymour, Indiana
F	22	Kendall Puryear	6 ft 3 in (1.91 m)	So	Blue Springs South High School	Lee's Summit, Missouri
G	23	Kiki Smith	5 ft 7 in (1.7 m)	Jr	Arkansas	Topeka, Kansas
G	24	Carley Barrett	5 ft 7 in (1.7 m)	Fr	Lafayette Central Catholic Jr/Sr High School	Lafayette, Indiana
G	33	Madison Layden-Zay	6 ft 1 in (1.85 m)	GS	Northwestern High School	Kokomo, Indiana
F	35	Lana McCarthy	6 ft 4 in (1.93 m)	So	Bedford High School	Bedford, New Hampshire
G	44	Tara Daye	5 ft 10 in (1.78 m)	RS Jr	St. John's	Newark, New Jersey
F	55	Avery Gordon	6 ft 7 in (2.01 m)	Fr	Brownsburg High School	Brownsburg, Indiana

Head coach

- Katie Gearlds (Purdue)

Assistant coach(es)

- Kelly Komara (Purdue)
- April Phillips (Xavier)
- Mark Stephens (Morehead State)

Legend

- (C) Team captain
- (S) Suspended
- (I) Ineligible
- (W) Walk-on
- Injured
- Current redshirt

Roster

== Schedule and results ==
Date time, TV	Rank^{#}	Opponent^{#}	Result	Record	High points	High rebounds	High assists	Site (attendance) city, state
Exhibition
October 27, 2025*; 7:00 p.m., B1G+		Purdue Northwest	W 118–42		16 – McCarthy	11 – Stahl	5 – Tied	Mackey Arena (3,436); West Lafayette, IN
Regular season
November 3, 2025*; 7:00 p.m., B1G+		Fairleigh Dickinson	W 67–48	1–0	19 – K. Smith	9 – Stahl	3 – McCarthy	Mackey Arena (4,726); West Lafayette, IN
November 6, 2025*; 7:00 p.m., B1G+		Eastern Illinois	W 82–67	2–0	24 – Karsh	7 – Karsh	4 – Tied	Mackey Arena (5,506); West Lafayette, IN
November 12, 2025*; 7:00 p.m., ESPN+		at Purdue Fort Wayne	L 67–68	2–1	18 – Karsh	6 – Tied	2 – Tied	Gates Sports Center (1,158); Fort Wayne, IN
November 18, 2025*; 7:00 p.m., SECN		at No. 20 Kentucky	L 35–76	2–2	10 – Daye	10 – Daye	2 – K. Smith	Memorial Coliseum (4,625); Lexington, KY
November 23, 2025*; 12:30 p.m., BTN		Miami (OH)	W 79–68	3–2	21 – Layden-Zay	7 – Stahl	7 – Feldman	Mackey Arena (3,780); West Lafayette, IN
November 26, 2025*; 12:00 p.m., B1G+		Howard	W 92–62	4–2	19 – McCarthy	15 – McCarthy	6 – K. Smith	Mackey Arena (6,848); West Lafayette, IN
November 30, 2025*; 1:00 p.m., ESPN+		at Central Michigan	L 55–57	4–3	14 – Daye	8 – Daye	5 – N. Smith	McGuirk Arena (1,013); Mount Pleasant, MI
December 3, 2025*; 7:00 p.m., B1G+		Evansville	W 91–49	5–3	16 – K. Smith	8 – Tied	4 – Tied	Mackey Arena (3,402); West Lafayette, IN
December 7, 2025; 12:00 p.m., BTN		at No. 6 Michigan	L 56–104	5–4 (0–1)	9 – Tied	5 – N. Smith	2 – Tied	Crisler Center (4,055); Ann Arbor, MI
December 11, 2025*; 11:00 a.m., B1G+		Lipscomb	W 88–45	6–4	18 – Daye	11 – Daye	6 – K. Smith	Mackey Arena (5,331); West Lafayette, IN
December 14, 2025*; 12:00 p.m., B1G+		Dayton	W 80–43	7–4	17 – Karsh	12 – Daye	5 – Layden-Zay	Mackey Arena (5,024); West Lafayette, IN
December 21, 2025*; 12:00 p.m., B1G+		Jackson State	W 93–62	8–4	22 – Daye	7 – K. Smith	6 – Karsh	Mackey Arena (5,203); West Lafayette, IN
December 28, 2025; 12:00 p.m., BTN		Illinois	L 73–83	8–5 (0–2)	20 – Puryear	9 – Daye	4 – Tied	Mackey Arena (6,031); West Lafayette, IN
December 31, 2025; 12:00 p.m., BTN		No. 19 Ohio State	L 56–83	8–6 (0–3)	17 – Layden-Zay	8 – Layden-Zay	2 – K. Smith	Mackey Arena (4,102); West Lafayette, IN
January 4, 2026; 3:00 p.m., B1G+		at No. 20 Nebraska	L 62–78	8–7 (0–4)	12 – Daye	6 – Tied	6 – Daye	Pinnacle Bank Arena (6,243); Lincoln, NE
January 8, 2026; 7:30 p.m., B1G+		at Wisconsin	W 75–67	9–7 (1–4)	20 – N. Smith	8 – Layden-Zay	4 – N. Smith	Kohl Center (2,458); Madison, WI
January 11, 2026; 2:00 p.m., B1G+		No. 23 Washington	W 78–72 ^{OT}	10–7 (2–4)	19 – Tied	12 – McCarthy	4 – Tied	Mackey Arena (6,005); West Lafayette, IN
January 18, 2026; 5:00 p.m., B1G+		at USC	L 57–83	10–8 (2–5)	21 – Daye	10 – Daye	6 – Layden-Zay	Galen Center (5,464); Los Angeles, CA
January 21, 2026; 10:00 p.m., B1G+		at No. 3 UCLA	L 48–96	10–9 (2–6)	14 – N. Smith	8 – Daye	6 – Layden-Zay	Pauley Pavilion (3,759); Los Angeles, CA
January 25, 2026; 12:00 p.m., B1G+		Indiana; Rivalry/Indiana National Guard Governor's Cup	W 80–69	11–9 (3–6)	13 – N. Smith	4 – Tied	6 – Layden-Zay	Mackey Arena (7,917); West Lafayette, IN
January 29, 2026; 6:00 p.m., BTN		No. 13 Michigan State	L 65–86	11–10 (3–7)	20 – Gordon	9 – Daye	8 – Daye	Mackey Arena (3,610); West Lafayette, IN
February 1, 2026; 1:00 p.m., B1G+		at Minnesota	L 55–88	11–11 (3–8)	16 – K. Smith	6 – Daye	4 – Layden-Zay	Williams Arena (4,502); Minneapolis, MN
February 4, 2026; 7:00 p.m., B1G+		Penn State	L 82–85 ^{OT}	11–12 (3–9)	24 – K. Smith	7 – Tied	4 – Tied	Mackey Arena (3,712); West Lafayette, IN
February 8, 2026; 2:00 p.m., B1G+		at Indiana; Rivalry/Indiana National Guard Governor's Cup	L 59–74	11–13 (3–10)	17 – Gordon	9 – Layden	6 – Layden-Zay	Simon Skjodt Assembly Hall (9,110); Bloomington, IN
February 14, 2026; 12:00 p.m., B1G+		Rutgers	W 72–57	12–13 (4–10)	17 – K. Smith	6 – Puryear	6 – K. Smith	Mackey Arena (6,452); West Lafayette, IN
February 19, 2026; 7:00 p.m., B1G+		No. 13 Iowa	L 74–83	12–14 (4–11)	19 – N. Smith	7 – Tied	5 – N. Smith	Mackey Arena (4,046); West Lafayette, IN
February 22, 2026; 1:00 p.m., B1G+		at No. 14 Maryland	L 66–99	12–15 (4–12)	19 – K. Smith	6 – McCarthy	6 – N. Smith	Xfinity Center (9,032); College Park, MD
February 25, 2026; 7:00 p.m., B1G+		Oregon	L 65–71	12–16 (4–13)	20 – N. Smith	9 – Daye	4 – N. Smith	Mackey Arena (5,428); West Lafayette, IN
March 1, 2026; 3:00 p.m., B1G+		at Northwestern	W 67–62	13–16 (5–13)	18 – Daye	8 – Daye	7 – N. Smith	Welsh–Ryan Arena (2,181); Evanston, IL
Big Ten tournament
March 4, 2026; 8:30 p.m., Peacock/NBCSN	(14)	vs. (11) Oregon; First Round	L 64–82	13–17	14 – McCarthy	9 – McCarthy	4 – N. Smith	Gainbridge Fieldhouse (6,587); Indianapolis, IN
*Non-conference game. ^{#}Rankings from AP Poll. (#) Tournament seedings in parentheses. All times are in Eastern Time.
