= 2025–26 Minnesota Golden Gophers women's basketball team =

American college basketball season

2025–26 Minnesota Golden Gophers women's basketball

NCAA tournament, Sweet Sixteen
- Conference: Big Ten Conference

Ranking
- Coaches: No. 18
- AP: No. 15
- Record: 24–9 (13–5 Big Ten)
- Head coach: Dawn Plitzuweit (3rd season)
- Associate head coach: Jason Jeschke
- Assistant coaches: Aaron Horn; Aerial Braker; Tyler VanWinkle
- Home arena: Williams Arena

2025–26 Big Ten women's basketball standings
	Conf.				Overall
Team	W		L	PCT	W		L	PCT
No. 1 UCLA †	18	–	0	1.000	37	–	1	.974
No. 7 Michigan	15	–	3	.833	28	–	7	.800
No. 16 Iowa	15	–	3	.833	27	–	7	.794
No. 17 Ohio State	13	–	5	.722	27	–	8	.771
No. 15 Minnesota	13	–	5	.722	24	–	9	.727
No. 20 Maryland	11	–	7	.611	24	–	9	.727
No. 22 Michigan State	11	–	7	.611	23	–	9	.719
No. 25 Washington	10	–	8	.556	22	–	11	.667
USC	9	–	9	.500	18	–	14	.563
Illinois	9	–	9	.500	22	–	12	.647
Oregon	8	–	10	.444	23	–	13	.639
Nebraska	7	–	11	.389	19	–	13	.594
Indiana	6	–	12	.333	18	–	14	.563
Purdue	5	–	13	.278	13	–	17	.433
Wisconsin	5	–	13	.278	16	–	18	.471
Penn State	4	–	14	.222	11	–	18	.379
Northwestern	2	–	16	.111	8	–	21	.276
Rutgers	1	–	17	.056	9	–	20	.310
† 2026 Big Ten tournament winner Rankings from AP poll

The 2025–26 Minnesota Golden Gophers women's basketball team currently represent the University of Minnesota during the 2025–26 NCAA Division I women's basketball season. The Golden Gophers, led by third-year head coach Dawn Plitzuweit, and played their home games at Williams Arena as members of the Big Ten Conference. The Gophers were not listed in the Big Ten preseason top five. The Gophers received votes in the preseason AP top 25, but were not listed. By February 18, 2026, the Gophers had won nine straight games, including their second win against a top ten ranked team, to move into number 23 in the AP poll and tied for 4th place in the Big Ten standings. The Gophers finished the regular season 13-5 and tied for 4th place. They gained the number four seed in the 2026 Big Ten women's basketball tournament with the tiebreaker over Ohio State. They lost to Ohio State in the Big Ten tournament. The Gophers were invited to host as a number four seed in the 2026 NCAA Division I women's basketball tournament. The Gophers advanced to the Sweet Sixteen, where they lost a re-match to the UCLA Bruins.

== Previous season ==
The Golden Gophers finished the 2024–25 season 25–11, 8–10 in Big Ten play to finish in thirteenth place. As the No. 13 seed in the Big Ten tournament, they lost in the first round to Washington. They received an at-large bid to the WBIT as the No. 2 seed in the Colorado bracket. They advanced to the championship game where they defeated Belmont. Minnesota was the sole Big Ten team invited to the 2025 WBIT.

== Offseason ==
Minnesota gained a top recruit in Makena Christian, the number one player in Wisconsin.

=== Departures ===
Name	Number	Pos.	Height	Year	Hometown	Reason for departure
Alexsia Rose	0	G	5'7"	Graduate Student	Bloomfield, CT	Graduated
Maggie Czinano	5	G	6'0"	Senior	Watertown, MN	Graduated
McKenna Johnson	7	G	5'9"	Freshman	Wilmot, WI	Transferred to Butler
Annika Stewart	21	F/C	6'3"	Graduate Student	Plymouth, MN	Graduated
Mallory Heyer	24	F	6'1"	Senior	Chaska, MN	Transferred to Oregon
Jordan Brooks	34	C	6'3"	Senior	Apple Valley, CA	Transferred to North Florida

=== Incoming transfers ===
Name	Number	Pos.	Height	Year	Hometown	Previous School
Tracey Bershers	1	F	6'2"	Senior	Fort Smith, AR	UAB
Brylee Glenn	12	G	5'11"	Graduate Student	Kansas City, MO	Kansas State
Finau Tonga	31	F/C	6'2"	Graduate Student	Taylorsville, UT	San Jose State

=== 2025 Recruiting class ===
College recruiting
Name	Hometown	School	Height	Weight	Commit date
Makena Christian; G	Hartford, WI	Hartford High School	5 ft 11 in (1.80 m)	N/A	
Makena Christian; G	Recruit ratings: ESPN: (94)				
Overall recruit ranking:
Note: In many cases, Scout, Rivals, 247Sports, On3, and ESPN may conflict in their listings of height and weight.; In these cases, the average was taken. ESPN grades are on a 100-point scale.; Sources: "2025 Player Commits". ESPN. Archived from the original on September 8, 2025.

==== Recruiting class of 2026 ====
College recruiting (2026)
Name	Hometown	School	Height	Weight	Commit date
Natalie Kussow; G	Hartland, WI	Arrowhead High School	5 ft 10 in (1.78 m)	N/A	
Natalie Kussow; G	Recruit ratings: ESPN: (94)				
Tori Oehrlein; G	Crosby, MN	Crosby Ironton High School	5 ft 11 in (1.80 m)	N/A	
Tori Oehrlein; G	Recruit ratings: ESPN: (93)				
Overall recruit ranking:
Note: In many cases, Scout, Rivals, 247Sports, On3, and ESPN may conflict in their listings of height and weight.; In these cases, the average was taken. ESPN grades are on a 100-point scale.; Sources: "2026 Player Commits". ESPN. Archived from the original on September 8, 2025.

== Roster ==
2025–26 Minnesota Golden Gophers women's basketball team
Players
Coaches

Pos.	#	Name	Height	Year	Previous school	Hometown
F	1	Tracey Bershers	6 ft 2 in (1.88 m)	Sr	UAB	Fort Smith, AR
G	3	Amaya Battle	5 ft 11 in (1.8 m)	Sr	Hopkins	Hopkins, MN
G	10	Mara Braun	6 ft 0 in (1.83 m)	RS Jr	Wayzata	Wayzata, MN
G	12	Brylee Glenn	5 ft 10 in (1.78 m)	GS	Kansas State	Kansas City, MO
G	14	Tori McKinney	6 ft 1 in (1.85 m)	So	Minnetonka	Minnetonka, MN
G	15	Brynn Senden	5 ft 6 in (1.68 m)	Jr	Wayzata	Wayzata, MN
F	20	Taylor Woodson	6 ft 0 in (1.83 m)	Jr	Michigan	Minnetonka, MN
G	22	Kennedy Klick	5 ft 11 in (1.8 m)	RS So	Maple Grove	Brooklyn Park, MN
G/F	25	Grace Grocholski	5 ft 10 in (1.78 m)	Jr	Kettle Moraine	North Prairie, WI
C	30	Zoey Bershers	6 ft 3 in (1.91 m)	Fr	Farmington	Glenwood, AR
F	31	Finau Tonga	6 ft 2 in (1.88 m)	GS	San Jose State	Taylorsville, UT
G	35	Makena Christian	6 ft 0 in (1.83 m)	Fr	Hartford Union	Lomira, WI
F	41	Niamya Holloway	6 ft 0 in (1.83 m)	RS Jr	Eden Prairie	Eden Prairie, MN
C	52	Sophie Hart	6 ft 5 in (1.96 m)	GS	NC State	Farmington, MN

Head coach

- Dawn Plitzuweit (Michigan Tech)

Assistant coach(es)

- Jason Jeschke (Southwestern (KS))
- Aaron Horn (Toledo)
- Ariel Braker (Notre Dame)
- Tyler VanWinkle (Illinois State)

Legend

- (C) Team captain
- (S) Suspended
- (I) Ineligible
- (W) Walk-on
- Injured
- Current redshirt

Roster

== Schedule and results ==
Date time, TV	Rank^{#}	Opponent^{#}	Result	Record	High points	High rebounds	High assists	Site (attendance) city, state
Regular season
November 4, 2025*; 7:00 p.m., B1G+		North Dakota	W 91–47	1–0	23 – Christian	10 – Battle	7 – Battle	Williams Arena (3,384); Minneapolis, MN
November 7, 2025*; 7:00 p.m., B1G+		Manhattan	W 99–36	2–0	17 – Braun	8 – Grocholski	7 – Grocholski	Williams Arena (2,904); Minneapolis, MN
November 11, 2025*; 7:00 p.m., B1G+		Marquette	W 90–47	3–0	19 – Grocholski	11 – Battle	7 – Tied	Williams Arena (2,999); Minneapolis, MN
November 14, 2025*; 5:00 p.m., B1G+		NJIT	W 88–39	4–0	13 – Glenn	10 – Battle	5 – Christian	Williams Arena (2,973); Minneapolis, MN
November 19, 2025*; 6:30 p.m., ESPN+		at Kansas	L 57–63	4–1	14 – McKinney	9 – Battle	4 – Tied	Allen Fieldhouse (3,518); Lawrence, KS
November 24, 2025*; 3:00 p.m., FloCollege		vs. South Florida; Pink Flamingo Championship Junkanoo Division semifinals	W 57–45	5–1	14 – Grocholski	10 – Hart	4 – Glenn	Baha Mar Convention Center (207); Nassau, Bahamas
November 26, 2025*; 3:00 p.m., FloCollege		vs. Alabama; Pink Flamingo Championship Junkanoo Division finals	L 58–63	5–2	13 – Glenn	11 – Hart	4 – Glenn	Baha Mar Convention Center (247); Nassau, Bahamas
December 1, 2025*; 7:00 p.m., B1G+		Samford	W 77–40	6–2	17 – Hart	10 – Hart	4 – McKinney	Williams Arena; Minneapolis, MN
December 7, 2025; 3:00 p.m., BTN		No. 7 Maryland	L 99–100 ^{2OT}	6–3 (0–1)	31 – Grocholski	12 – Battle	7 – Battle	Williams Arena (4,854); Minneapolis, MN
December 10, 2025*; 7:00 p.m., B1G+		Alabama A&M	W 82–44	7–3	13 – McKinney	8 – Glenn	6 – Tied	Williams Arena (2,803); Minneapolis, MN
December 14, 2025*; 5:00 p.m., B1G+		Wyoming	W 80–34	8–3	14 – Glenn	8 – Battle	5 – Braun	Williams Arena (3,266); Minneapolis, MN
December 21, 2025*; 2:00 p.m., ESPN+		at Drake	W 68–43	9–3	18 – Grocholski	11 – Grocholski	3 – Grocholski	Knapp Center (2,570); Des Moines, IA
December 29, 2025; 5:00 p.m., B1G+		at Indiana	W 71–48	10–3 (1–1)	20 – Battle	12 – Hart	3 – McKinney	Simon Skjodt Assembly Hall (8,134); Bloomington, IN
January 5, 2026; 5:30 p.m., BTN		at No. 9 Michigan	L 60–70	10–4 (1–2)	22 – Grocholski	8 – Grocholski	2 – Tied	Crisler Center (3,046); Ann Arbor, MI
January 8, 2026; 7:00 p.m., B1G+		Northwestern	W 79–47	11–4 (2–2)	20 – McKinney	8 – Tonga	5 – Battle	Williams Arena (3,865); Minneapolis, MN
January 11, 2026; 2:00 p.m., B1G+		No. 21 USC	W 63–62	12–4 (3–2)	25 – Grocholski	10 – Braun	4 – Battle	Williams Arena (5,514); Minneapolis, MN
January 14, 2026; 7:00 p.m., B1G+		No. 3 UCLA	L 58–76	12–5 (3–3)	16 – Battle	7 – Battle	5 – Battle	Williams Arena (4,374); Minneapolis, MN
January 18, 2026; 5:00 p.m., BTN		at Washington	L 54–67	12–6 (3–4)	18 – Braun	7 – Grocholski	3 – Tied	Alaska Airlines Arena (3,509); Seattle, WA
January 21, 2026; 8:00 p.m., B1G+		at Oregon	W 65–60	13–6 (4–4)	20 – Battle	9 – Braun	3 – Tied	Matthew Knight Arena (4,675); Eugene, OR
January 25, 2026; 2:00 p.m., B1G+		Wisconsin	W 88–53	14–6 (5–4)	20 – McKinney	7 – McKinney	5 – Glenn	Williams Arena (5,749); Minneapolis, MN
January 28, 2026; 5:00 p.m., B1G+		at Penn State	W 87–66	15–6 (6–4)	23 – McKinney	10 – Battle	4 – Tied	Rec Hall (1,546); State College, PA
February 1, 2026; 2:00 p.m., B1G+		Purdue	W 88–55	16–6 (7–4)	17 – Battle	9 – Battle	5 – McKinney	Williams Arena (4,502); Minneapolis, MN
February 5, 2026; 6:00 p.m., BTN		at No. 10 Iowa	W 91–85	17–6 (8–4)	21 – Grocholski	14 – Battle	6 – Battle	Carver–Hawkeye Arena (14,998); Iowa, City, IA
February 8, 2026; 11:00 a.m., B1G+		at Rutgers	W 63–52	18–6 (9–4)	17 – Hart	10 – Hart	3 – Tied	Jersey Mike's Arena (5,480); Piscataway, NJ
February 12, 2026; 7:00 p.m., BTN		Nebraska	W 84–67	19–6 (10–4)	21 – Battle	6 – Tied	5 – McKinney	Williams Arena (4,039); Minneapolis, MN
February 15, 2026; 5:00 p.m., BTN		at Wisconsin	W 83–60	20–6 (11–4)	20 – Braun	6 – Hart	4 – McKinney	Kohl Center (3,953); Madison, WI
February 18, 2026; 7:00 p.m., B1G+	No. 23	No. 10 Ohio State	W 74–61	21–6 (12–4)	18 – Tied	12 – Battle	5 – Tied	Williams Arena (4,025); Minneapolis, MN
February 22, 2026; 5:00 p.m., FS1	No. 23	No. 18 Michigan State	L 61–75	21–7 (12–5)	29 – McKinney	9 – Hart	4 – Tied	Williams Arena (7,088); Minneapolis, MN
March 1, 2026; 1:00 p.m., BTN	No. 22	at Illinois	W 78–73	22–7 (13–5)	17 – Hart	8 – Battle	5 – Braun	State Farm Center (5,785); Champaign, IL
Big Ten tournament
March 6, 2026; 1:30 p.m., BTN	(4) No. 19	vs. (5) No. 11 Ohio State; Quarterfinals	L 55–60	22–8	18 – Grocholski	19 – Hart	6 – Braun	Gainbridge Fieldhouse (5,146); Indianapolis, IN
NCAA tournament
March 20, 2026*; 5:00 p.m., ESPNU	(4 S2) No. 18	(13 S2) Green Bay; First Round	W 75–58	23–8	21 – Battle	8 – Tied	5 – Grocholski	Williams Arena (10,355); Minneapolis, MN
March 22, 2026*; 1:00 p.m., ESPN	(4 S2) No. 18	(5 S2) No. 19 Ole Miss; Second Round	W 65–63	24–8	17 – Braun	11 – Battle	5 – Battle	Williams Arena (10,763); Minneapolis, MN
March 27, 2026*; 6:30 p.m., ESPN	(4 S2) No. 18	vs. (1 S2) No. 2 UCLA; Sweet Sixteen	L 56–80	24–9	12 – Grocholski	8 – Battle	4 – Battle	Golden 1 Center (9,446); Sacramento, CA
*Non-conference game. ^{#}Rankings from AP Poll. (#) Tournament seedings in parentheses. Sacramento 2=S2. All times are in Central Time.

== Rankings ==
Ranking movements Legend: ██ Increase in ranking ██ Decrease in ranking — = Not ranked RV = Received votes
	Week																				
Poll	Pre	1	2	3	4	5	6	7	8	9	10	11	12	13	14	15	16	17	18	19	Final
AP	RV	RV	RV	RV	—	—	—	—	—*	—	RV	RV	RV	RV	RV	23	22	19	18	18	15
Coaches	RV	RV	RV	RV	—	—	—	—	—	—	RV	RV	RV	RV	RV	23	22	20	19	19	18

*AP did not release a week 8 poll.
