= 2025–26 Oregon Ducks women's basketball team =

Intercollegiate basketball season

2025–26 Oregon Ducks women's basketball

NCAA tournament, Second Round
- Conference: Big Ten Conference
- Record: 23–13 (8–10 Big Ten)
- Head coach: Kelly Graves (12th season)
- Associate head coach: Jodie Berry
- Assistant coaches: Jerise Freeman; Tre Simmons; Lisa O'Meara; Oti Gildon
- Home arena: Matthew Knight Arena

2025–26 Big Ten women's basketball standings
| | Conf. | | | | Overall |
| Team | W | | L | PCT | W | | L | PCT |
|---|---|---|---|---|---|---|---|---|
| No. 1 UCLA † | 18 | – | 0 | 1.000 | 37 | – | 1 | .974 |
| No. 7 Michigan | 15 | – | 3 | .833 | 28 | – | 7 | .800 |
| No. 16 Iowa | 15 | – | 3 | .833 | 27 | – | 7 | .794 |
| No. 17 Ohio State | 13 | – | 5 | .722 | 27 | – | 8 | .771 |
| No. 15 Minnesota | 13 | – | 5 | .722 | 24 | – | 9 | .727 |
| No. 20 Maryland | 11 | – | 7 | .611 | 24 | – | 9 | .727 |
| No. 22 Michigan State | 11 | – | 7 | .611 | 23 | – | 9 | .719 |
| No. 25 Washington | 10 | – | 8 | .556 | 22 | – | 11 | .667 |
| USC | 9 | – | 9 | .500 | 18 | – | 14 | .563 |
| Illinois | 9 | – | 9 | .500 | 22 | – | 12 | .647 |
| Oregon | 8 | – | 10 | .444 | 23 | – | 13 | .639 |
| Nebraska | 7 | – | 11 | .389 | 19 | – | 13 | .594 |
| Indiana | 6 | – | 12 | .333 | 18 | – | 14 | .563 |
| Purdue | 5 | – | 13 | .278 | 13 | – | 17 | .433 |
| Wisconsin | 5 | – | 13 | .278 | 16 | – | 18 | .471 |
| Penn State | 4 | – | 14 | .222 | 11 | – | 18 | .379 |
| Northwestern | 2 | – | 16 | .111 | 8 | – | 21 | .276 |
| Rutgers | 1 | – | 17 | .056 | 9 | – | 20 | .310 |
† 2026 Big Ten tournament winner Rankings from AP poll

The 2025–26 Oregon Ducks women's basketball team represents the University of Oregon during the 2025–26 NCAA Division I women's basketball season. The Ducks, led by twelfth-year head coach Kelly Graves, played their home games at Matthew Knight Arena in Eugene, Oregon as a second-year member of the Big Ten Conference.

== Previous season ==
The Ducks finished the 2024–25 season at 20–12, 10–8 in Big Ten play to finish in a three-way tie for eighth place. As the 8th seed in the Big Ten women's tournament, they lost in the second round to Indiana. They received an at-large bid to the NCAA tournament as the No. 10 seed Birmingham 2 region. They defeated Vanderbilt in the first round before losing to Duke in the second round.

== Offseason ==
=== Departures ===
| Name | Number | Pos. | Height | Year | Hometown | Reason for departure |
|---|---|---|---|---|---|---|
| Alexis Whitfield | 1 | F | 6'2" | GS senior | West Hills, CA | Graduated |
| Nani Falatea | 4 | G | 5'9" | Senior | Salt Lake City, UT | Graduated |
| Peyton Scott | 10 | G | 5'8" | GS senior | Lynchburg, OH | Graduated |
| Salimatou Kourouma | 12 | F | 5'11" | GS senior | Kati, Mali | Graduated |
| Phillipina Kyei | 15 | C | 6'8" | Senior | Calgary, AB | Graduated |
| Deja Kelly | 25 | G | 5'8" | GS senior | San Antonio, TX | Graduated/undrafted in 2025 WNBA draft; signed with the Las Vegas Aces |

=== Incoming transfers ===
| Name | Number | Pos. | Height | Year | Hometown | Previous school |
|---|---|---|---|---|---|---|
| Astera Tuhina | 0 | G | 5'9" | Senior | Pristina, Kosovo | Washington State |
| Mia Jacobs | 1 | F | 6'2" | Senior | Perth, Australia | Fresno State |
| Mallory Heyer | 13 | F | 6'1" | Senior | Chaska, MN | Minnesota |
| Avary Cain | 42 | G | 6'1" | Sophomore | Santa Maria, CA | UCLA |

=== Recruiting class of 2025 ===
College recruiting
| Name | Hometown | School | Height | Weight | Commit date |
|---|---|---|---|---|---|
| Janiyah Williams; G | Edmond, OK | Edmond Memorial High School | 5 ft 10 in (1.78 m) | N/A | |
| Janiyah Williams; G | Recruit ratings: ESPN: (94) | | | | |
Overall recruit ranking:
Note: In many cases, Scout, Rivals, 247Sports, On3, and ESPN may conflict in their listings of height and weight.; In these cases, the average was taken. ESPN grades are on a 100-point scale.; Sources: "2025 Player Commits". ESPN. Archived from the original on November 5, 2024.

== Roster ==
2025–26 Oregon Ducks women's basketball team
Players
Coaches

| Pos. | # | Name | Height | Year | Previous school | Hometown |
|---|---|---|---|---|---|---|
| G | 0 | Astera Tuhina | 5 ft 9 in (1.75 m) | Sr | Washington State | Pristina, Kosovo |
| F | 1 | Mia Jacobs | 6 ft 2 in (1.88 m) | Sr | Fresno State | Perth, Australia |
| G | 2 | Katie Fiso | 5 ft 11 in (1.8 m) | So | Garfield HS | Seattle, WA |
| G | 3 | Sofia Bell | 6 ft 1 in (1.85 m) | Jr | Jesuit HS | Portland, OR |
| F | 5 | Amina Muhammad | 6 ft 4 in (1.93 m) | RS Sr | Texas | DeSoto, TX |
| G | 8 | Elisa Mevius (injured) | 5 ft 10 in (1.78 m) | Sr | Siena | Rendsburg, Germany |
| G/F | 11 | Sammie Wagner | 6 ft 1 in (1.85 m) | RS Jr | Ronald Reagan HS | San Antonio, TX |
| F | 13 | Mallory Heyer | 6 ft 1 in (1.85 m) | Sr | Minnesota | Chaska, MN |
| G | 14 | Ari Long | 6 ft 0 in (1.83 m) | Jr | Washington | Moreno Valley, CA |
| F | 21 | Filippa Tilliander | 5 ft 11 in (1.8 m) | Jr | Norrköping Dolphins | Malmö, Sweden |
| G | 22 | Janiyah Williams | 5 ft 9 in (1.75 m) | Fr | Edmond Memorial HS | Edmond, OK |
| F | 23 | Sarah Rambus | 6 ft 3 in (1.91 m) | Jr | IMG Academy | Flint, MI |
| G | 25 | Sara Barhoum | 5 ft 10 in (1.78 m) | Fr | Clackamas HS | Clackamas, OR |
| F | 35 | Ehis Etute | 6 ft 0 in (1.83 m) | So | T71 Dudelange | Dudelange, Luxembourg |
| G | 42 | Avary Cain | 6 ft 1 in (1.85 m) | So | UCLA | Santa Maria, CA |

Head coach

- Kelly Graves (New Mexico)

Assistant coach(es)

- Jodie Berry (Western Washington)
- Jerise Freeman (Pacific)
- Tre Simmons (Washington)
- Lisa O'Meara (Saint Mary's)
- Oti Gildon (Oregon)

Legend

- (C) Team captain
- (S) Suspended
- (I) Ineligible
- (W) Walk-on
- Injured
- Current redshirt

Roster

== Schedule and results ==
| Date time, TV | Rank^{#} | Opponent^{#} | Result | Record | High points | High rebounds | High assists | Site (attendance) city, state |
Exhibition
| October 30, 2025*; 6:00 p.m., B1G+ | | Western Oregon | W 113–36 | | 28 – Rambus | 9 – Etute | 9 – Fiso | Matthew Knight Arena (4,354); Eugene, OR |
Regular season
| November 3, 2025*; 6:00 p.m., B1G+ | | West Georgia | W 100–59 | 1–0 | 16 – Jacobs | 7 – Muhammad | 10 – Fiso | Matthew Knight Arena (4,404); Eugene, OR |
| November 8, 2025*; 2:00 p.m., B1G+ | | Montana | W 90–47 | 2–0 | 12 – Etute | 7 – Etute | 5 – Fiso | Matthew Knight Arena (4,296); Eugene, OR |
| November 11, 2025*; 6:00 p.m., B1G+ | | Grand Canyon | W 84–66 | 3–0 | 26 – Jacobs | 5 – Etute | 10 – Fiso | Matthew Knight Arena (5,177); Eugene, OR |
| November 16, 2025*; 2:00 p.m., B1G+ | | Army | W 80–55 | 4–0 | 17 – Jacobs | 5 – Tied | 10 – Fiso | Matthew Knight Arena (4,646); Eugene, OR |
| November 19, 2025*; 4:00 p.m., ESPN+ | | at Washington State | W 86–59 | 5–0 | 22 – Fiso | 13 – Etute | 8 – Fiso | Beasley Coliseum (920); Pullman, WA |
| November 23, 2025*; 2:00 p.m., B1G+ | | Utah State | W 70–34 | 6–0 | 13 – Tied | 7 – Jacobs | 6 – Fiso | Matthew Knight Arena (4,645); Eugene, OR |
| November 25, 2025*; 11:30 a.m., FloHoops | | vs. Saint Mary's; Hoopfest Women's Challenge | W 71–53 | 7–0 | 15 – Tied | 5 – Rambus | 10 – Fiso | Comerica Center (257); Frisco, TX |
| November 27, 2025*; 9:00 a.m., FloHoops | | vs. Old Dominion; Hoopfest Women's Challenge | W 84–46 | 8–0 | 18 – Tuhina | 8 – Etute | 4 – Tied | Comerica Center (125); Frisco, TX |
| November 30, 2025*; 12:00 p.m., SECN+/ESPN+ | | at Auburn | W 58–53 | 9–0 | 24 – Fiso | 15 – Etute | 2 – Tied | Neville Arena (3,115); Auburn, AL |
| December 3, 2025*; 6:00 p.m., B1G+ | | Oregon State; Rivalry | W 96–73 | 10–0 | 23 – Fiso | 6 – Jacobs | 14 – Fiso | Matthew Knight Arena (5,282); Eugene, OR |
| December 7, 2025; 12:00 p.m., FS1 | | at No. 4 UCLA | L 59–80 | 10–1 (0–1) | 14 – Tied | 9 – Etute | 7 – Fiso | Pauley Pavilion (3,889); Los Angeles, CA |
| December 14, 2025*; 12:00 p.m., B1G+ | | Montana State | W 69–44 | 11–1 | 15 – Bell | 12 – Etute | 5 – Fiso | Matthew Knight Arena (4,169); Eugene, OR |
| December 18, 2025*; 11:00 a.m., B1G+ | | Portland | W 85–59 | 12–1 | 21 – Jacobs | 10 – Jacobs | 11 – Fiso | Matthew Knight Arena (6,279); Eugene, OR |
| December 21, 2025*; 3:00 p.m., ESPN | | vs. Stanford; Invisalign Bay Area Women's Classic | L 53–64 | 12–2 | 14 – Fiso | 11 – Jacobs | 3 – Fiso | Chase Center; San Francisco, CA |
| December 29, 2025; 6:00 p.m., FS1 | | No. 6 Michigan | L 87–92 ^{2OT} | 12–3 (0–2) | 24 – Fiso | 7 – Tied | 4 – Fiso | Matthew Knight Arena (5,439); Eugene, OR |
| January 1, 2026; 2:00 p.m., B1G+ | | Northwestern | W 87–54 | 13–3 (1–2) | 17 – Fiso | 6 – Jacobs | 6 – Fiso | Matthew Knight Arena (4,195); Eugene, OR |
| January 6, 2026; 7:00 p.m., BTN | | at No. 21 USC | W 71–66 | 14–3 (2–2) | 21 – Dunn | 13 – Davidson | 5 – Davidson | Galen Center (4,259); Los Angeles, CA |
| January 11, 2026; 2:00 p.m., B1G+ | | No. 15 Michigan State | L 81–85 | 14–4 (2–3) | 20 – Fiso | 6 – Tied | 9 – Fiso | Matthew Knight Arena (6,313); Eugene, OR |
| January 15, 2026; 6:00 p.m., FS1 | | at No. 11 Iowa | L 66–74 | 14–5 (2–4) | 15 – Etute | 8 – Etute | 3 – Tied | Carver–Hawkeye Arena (14,988); Iowa City, IA |
| January 18, 2026; 1:00 p.m., BTN | | at Wisconsin | L 92–94 ^{2OT} | 14–6 (2–5) | 30 – Jacobs | 10 – Etute | 7 – Fiso | Kohl Center (4,147); Madison, WI |
| January 21, 2026; 6:00 p.m., B1G+ | | Minnesota | L 60–65 | 14–7 (2–6) | 11 – Tied | 12 – Etute | 3 – Etute | Matthew Knight Arena (4,675); Eugene, OR |
| January 24, 2026; 2:00 p.m., B1G+ | | Penn State | W 89–59 | 15–7 (3–6) | 20 – Rambus | 11 – Etute | 10 – Fiso | Matthew Knight Arena (6,136); Eugene, OR |
| January 28, 2026; 4:00 p.m., B1G+ | | at Rutgers | W 74–53 | 16–7 (4–6) | 17 – Etute | 12 – Long | 7 – Fiso | Jersey Mike's Arena (1,704); Piscataway, NJ |
| January 31, 2026; 2:00 p.m., BTN | | at No. 16 Maryland | W 68–61 | 17–7 (5–6) | 26 – Etute | 11 – Etute | 3 – Tied | Xfinity Center (9,364); College Park, MD |
| February 4, 2026; 6:00 p.m., B1G+ | | Illinois | W 76–73 | 18–7 (6–6) | 23 – Jacobs | 9 – Tied | 9 – Fiso | Matthew Knight Arena (4,397); Eugene, OR |
| February 8, 2026; 12:00 p.m., B1G+ | | No. 9 Ohio State | L 60–70 | 18–8 (6–7) | 16 – Long | 8 – Etute | 8 – Fiso | Matthew Knight Arena (5,371); Eugene, OR |
| February 15, 2026; 5:00 p.m., BTN | | at No. 25 Washington | L 43–51 | 18–9 (6–8) | 12 – Rambus | 11 – Etute | 5 – Fiso | Alaska Airlines Arena (5,134); Seattle, WA |
| February 19, 2026; 6:00 p.m., B1G+ | | Nebraska | W 80–76 | 19–9 (7–8) | 21 – Etute | 6 – Tied | 4 – Etute | Matthew Knight Arena (4,827); Eugene, OR |
| February 22, 2026; 10:00 a.m., BTN | | at Indiana | L 65–72 | 19–10 (7–9) | 27 – Etute | 17 – Etute | 6 – Fiso | Simon Skjodt Assembly Hall (8,136); Bloomington, IN |
| February 25, 2026; 4:00 p.m., B1G+ | | at Purdue | W 71–65 | 20–10 (8–9) | 19 – Fiso | 8 – Etute | 4 – Fiso | Mackey Arena (5,428); West Lafayette, IN |
| March 1, 2026; 2:00 p.m., B1G+ | | Washington | L 69–70 | 20–11 (8–10) | 27 – Fiso | 13 – Etute | 4 – Bell | Matthew Knight Arena (5,865); Eugene, OR |
Big Ten women's tournament
| March 4, 2026; 5:30 p.m., Peacock | (11) | vs. (14) Purdue; First Round | W 82–64 | 21–11 | 20 – Fiso | 12 – Etute | 4 – Fiso | Gainbridge Fieldhouse (6,587); Indianapolis, IN |
| March 5, 2026; 6:00 p.m., BTN | (11) | vs. (6) No. 14 Maryland; Second Round | W 73–68 | 22–11 | 20 – Etute | 10 – Etute | 5 – Fiso | Gainbridge Fieldhouse (5,149); Indianapolis, IN |
| March 6, 2026; 6:00 p.m., BTN | (11) | vs. (3) No. 8 Michigan; Quarterfinals | L 58–80 | 22–12 | 22 – Fiso | 11 – Etute | 7 – Fiso | Gainbridge Fieldhouse (6,053); Indianapolis, IN |
NCAA women's tournament
| March 20, 2026*; 10:30 a.m., ESPN2 | (8 FW3) | vs. (9 FW3) Virginia Tech; First Round | W 70–60 | 23–12 | 22 – Fiso | 11 – Etute | 4 – Fiso | Moody Center; Austin, TX |
| March 22, 2026*; 3:00 p.m., ESPN | (8 FW3) | at (1 FW3) No. 3 Texas; Second Round | L 58–100 | 23–13 | 16 – Fiso | 10 – Etute | 3 – Tied | Moody Center (8,981); Austin, TX |
*Non-conference game. ^{#}Rankings from AP poll. (#) Tournament seedings in parentheses. Fort Worth 3=FW3. All times are in Pacific.

== Rankings ==
Ranking movements Legend: ██ Increase in ranking ██ Decrease in ranking — = Not ranked RV = Received votes
| | Week | | | | | | | | | | | | | | | | | | | | |
| Poll | Pre | 1 | 2 | 3 | 4 | 5 | 6 | 7 | 8 | 9 | 10 | 11 | 12 | 13 | 14 | 15 | 16 | 17 | 18 | 19 | Final |
|---|---|---|---|---|---|---|---|---|---|---|---|---|---|---|---|---|---|---|---|---|---|
| AP | — | — | — | RV | RV | RV | — | RV | RV* | — | RV | — | — | — | — | — | — | — | RV | RV | RV |
| Coaches | — | — | — | RV | RV | RV | RV | RV | RV | RV | RV | — | — | — | — | — | — | — | — | — | — |

*AP did not release a week 8 poll.

== See also ==
- 2025–26 Oregon Ducks men's basketball team
