= 2025–26 Wisconsin Badgers women's basketball team =

Intercollegiate college basketball season

2025–26 Wisconsin Badgers women's basketball

WBIT, Semifinals
- Conference: Big Ten Conference
- Record: 16–18 (5–13 Big Ten)
- Head coach: Robin Pingeton (1st season)
- Associate head coach: Chris Bracey
- Assistant coaches: McGhee Mann; Ariel Massengale
- Home arena: Kohl Center

2025–26 Big Ten women's basketball standings
	Conf.				Overall
Team	W		L	PCT	W		L	PCT
No. 1 UCLA †	18	–	0	1.000	37	–	1	.974
No. 7 Michigan	15	–	3	.833	28	–	7	.800
No. 16 Iowa	15	–	3	.833	27	–	7	.794
No. 17 Ohio State	13	–	5	.722	27	–	8	.771
No. 15 Minnesota	13	–	5	.722	24	–	9	.727
No. 20 Maryland	11	–	7	.611	24	–	9	.727
No. 22 Michigan State	11	–	7	.611	23	–	9	.719
No. 25 Washington	10	–	8	.556	22	–	11	.667
USC	9	–	9	.500	18	–	14	.563
Illinois	9	–	9	.500	22	–	12	.647
Oregon	8	–	10	.444	23	–	13	.639
Nebraska	7	–	11	.389	19	–	13	.594
Indiana	6	–	12	.333	18	–	14	.563
Purdue	5	–	13	.278	13	–	17	.433
Wisconsin	5	–	13	.278	16	–	18	.471
Penn State	4	–	14	.222	11	–	18	.379
Northwestern	2	–	16	.111	8	–	21	.276
Rutgers	1	–	17	.056	9	–	20	.310
† 2026 Big Ten tournament winner Rankings from AP poll

The 2025–26 Wisconsin Badgers women's basketball team represented the University of Wisconsin–Madison in the 2025–26 NCAA Division I women's basketball season. The Badgers, led by first-year head coach Robin Pingeton, played their games at Kohl Center as members of the Big Ten Conference.

Wisconin was invited to the 2026 Women's Basketball Invitation Tournament. They lost in the semifinals to Columbia.

== Previous season ==
The Badgers finished the 2024–25 season 13–16, 4–14 in Big Ten play to finish in 14th place. They lost to Iowa in the first round of the Big Ten tournament.

Citing personal reasons, head coach Marisa Moseley announced her resignation from Wisconsin on March 9, 2025, after four seasons. Former Wisconsin players later filed a lawsuit against Moseley and the school alleging psychological abuse by Moseley. Former Missouri head coach Robin Pingeton was hired by the Badgers on March 25.

== Offseason ==
=== Departures ===
Wisconsin departures
Name	Num	Pos.	Height	Year	Hometown	Reason for departure
Carter McCray	1	C	6'1"	Sophomore	Oberlin, OH	Transferred to West Virginia
Tess Myers	3	G	5'9"	Senior	Lower Burrell, PA	Graduated
Halle Douglass	10	G	6'1"	Graduate student	Lake Forest, IL	Graduated
Tessa Grady	12	F	6'2"	Sophomore	Dublin, OH	Transferred to Coastal Carolina
Gracie Grzesk	22	F	5'11"	Freshman	Green Bay, WI	Transferred to Green Bay
D'Yanis Jimenez	23	G	5'8"	Sophomore	Cape Coral, FL	Transferred to Coastal Carolina
Natalie Leuzinger	24	G	5'8"	Graduate student	Monroe, WI	Walk-on; graduated
Serah Williams	25	F	6'4"	Junior	Brooklyn, NY	Transferred to UConn

=== Incoming transfers ===
Wisconsin incoming transfers
Name	Num	Pos.	Height	Year	Hometown	Previous school
Destiny Howell	1	G	6'0"	Graduate student	Queens, NY	Howard
Breauna Ware	3	G	5'8"	(redshirt) Junior	Queens, NY	Stony Brook
Gift Uchenna	15	F	6'3"	Senior	Ebonyi State, Nigeria	Southern Illinois
Kyrah Daniels	20	G	6'0"	Junior	Highlands Ranch, CO	Missouri State
Shay Bollin	22	F	6'3"	Senior	Raynham, MA	Illinois
Laci Steele	24	G	5'11"	Junior	Edmond, OK	NC State

==== Recruiting ====
There was no recruiting class of 2025.

== Roster ==
2025–26 Wisconsin Badgers women's basketball team
Players
Coaches

Pos.	#	Name	Height	Year	Previous school	Hometown
G	0	Nikki Kerstein	5 ft 8 in (1.73 m)	Fr	Montini Catholic	Riverwoods, IL
G	1	Destiny Howell	6 ft 0 in (1.83 m)	GS	St. Francis Prep; Howard	Queens, NY
F	2	Alie Bisballe	6 ft 4 in (1.93 m)	So	Lake City	Lake City, MI
G	3	Breauna Ware	5 ft 7 in (1.7 m)	RS Jr	Mary Louis Academy; Stony Brook	Queens, NY
G	4	Lily Krahn	5 ft 10 in (1.78 m)	Sr	Prairie du Chien	Prairie du Chien, WI
G	5	Leena Patibandla	6 ft 0 in (1.83 m)	Jr	Jackson	Canton, OH
C	6	Dorja Iva Zaja	6 ft 3 in (1.91 m)	Fr	Privatna Gimnazija Marul Zagreb	Zagreb, Croatia
G	9	Alba Martín Mesa	5 ft 6 in (1.68 m)	So	ÍES Pérez Galdós	Las Palmas de Gran Canaria, Spain
G/F	11	Jovana Spasovski	6 ft 0 in (1.83 m)	So	Gimnazija Patrijarh Pavle	Belgrade, Serbia
G	13	Ronnie Porter	5 ft 2 in (1.57 m)	Sr	Como Park	St. Paul, MN
G	14	Reese Jaramillo	5 ft 8 in (1.73 m)	So	The Prairie School	Racine, WI
F	15	Gift Uchenna Okeke	6 ft 3 in (1.91 m)	Sr	Kōchi Chūō High School; Southern Illinois	Ebonyi State, Nigeria
G	20	Kyrah Daniels	6 ft 0 in (1.83 m)	Jr	ThuderRidge; Missouri State	Highlands Ranch, CO
F	22	Shay Bollin	6 ft 3 in (1.91 m)	Sr	Bridgewater-Raynham; Illinois	Raynham, MA
G	24	Laci Steele	5 ft 11 in (1.8 m)	Jr	Edmond North; NC State	Edmond, OK

Head coach

- Robin Pingeton (St. Ambrose)

Assistant coach(es)

- Chris Bracey (West Texas A&M)
- McGhee Mann (South Carolina)
- Ariel Massengale (Tennessee)

Legend

- (C) Team captain
- (S) Suspended
- (I) Ineligible
- (W) Walk-on
- Injured
- Current redshirt

Roster

== Schedule and results ==
Date time, TV	Rank^{#}	Opponent^{#}	Result	Record	High points	High rebounds	High assists	Site (attendance) city, state
Exhibition
October 27, 2025*; 6:30 p.m., B1G+		UW–River Falls	W 104–40		22 – Howell	6 – Tied	5 – Kerstein	Kohl Center (2,343); Madison, WI
Regular season
November 5, 2025*; 6:30 p.m., B1G+		Oakland	W 79–68	1–0	17 – Howell	7 – Uchenna	4 – Porter	Kohl Center (2,430); Madison, WI
November 8, 2025*; 2:00 p.m., ESPN+		at Marquette	L 62–65	1–1	17 – Daniels	10 – Uchenna	5 – Porter	Al McGuire Center (1,633); Milwaukee, WI
November 10, 2025*; 6:30 p.m., B1G+		Milwaukee	W 75–46	2–1	13 – Ware	8 – Uchenna	2 – Tied	Kohl Center; Madison, WI
November 12, 2025*; 6:30 p.m., B1G+		Bowling Green	W 90–78	3–1	21 – Daniels	5 – Tied	5 – Porter	Kohl Center (2,368); Madison, WI
November 16, 2025*; 2:00 p.m., B1G+		Green Bay	W 76–72	4–1	23 – Howell	9 – Daniels	4 – Ware	Kohl Center (3,330); Madison, WI
November 19, 2025*; 7:00 p.m., Marquee		at UIC	W 74–53	5–1	25 – Krahn	7 – Daniels	8 – Daniels	Credit Union 1 Arena (581); Chicago, IL
November 23, 2025*; 2:00 p.m., B1G+		Detroit Mercy	W 81–63	6–1	18 – Krahn	9 – Uchenna	6 – Porter	Kohl Center (2,594); Madison, WI
November 28, 2025*; 3:00 p.m., Baller TV		vs. No. 13 Ole Miss; Daytona Beach Classic	L 56–65	6–2	14 – Howell	5 – Tied	5 – Porter	Ocean Center (225); Daytona Beach, FL
November 29, 2025*; 12:30 p.m., Baller TV		vs. James Madison; Daytona Beach Classic	L 50–69	6–3	18 – Daniels	5 – Tied	3 – Tied	Ocean Center (157); Daytona Beach, FL
December 7, 2025; 5:00 p.m., BTN		No. 20 Michigan State	W 78–64	7–3 (1–0)	14 – Tied	15 – Uchenna Okeke	8 – Porter	Kohl Center (3,039); Madison, WI
December 10, 2025*; 11:00 a.m., B1G+		San Diego	W 74–46	8–3	14 – Howell	6 – Uchenna	4 – Porter	Kohl Center (5,653); Madison, WI
December 21, 2025*; 11:00 a.m., B1G+		IU Indy	W 81–72	9–3	17 – Ware	9 – Daniels	5 – Daniels	Kohl Center (1,329); Madison, WI
December 29, 2025; 3:00 p.m., B1G+		at No. 7 Maryland	L 59–97	9–4 (1–1)	14 – Howell	5 – Tied	4 – Porter	Xfinity Center (7,580); College Park, MD
January 1, 2026; 1:00 p.m., B1G+		at Rutgers	W 70–63	10–4 (2–1)	29 – Daniels	9 – Uchenna	10 – Porter	Jersey Mike's Arena (1,946); Piscataway, NJ
January 4, 2026; 3:00 p.m., BTN		Penn State	W 74–73	11–4 (3–1)	20 – Daniels	8 – Daniels	5 – Porter	Kohl Center (3,615); Madison, WI
January 8, 2026; 6:30 p.m., B1G+		Purdue	L 67–75	11–5 (3–2)	13 – Steele	7 – Daniels	6 – Porter	Kohl Center (2,458); Madison, WI
January 11, 2026; 1:00 p.m., B1G+		at No. 9 Michigan	L 60–86	11–6 (3–3)	12 – Howell	5 – Howell	3 – Tied	Crisler Center (4,488); Ann Arbor, MI
January 15, 2026; 7:00 p.m., B1G+		at Northwestern	L 61–66	11–7 (3–4)	13 – Howell	6 – Ware	5 – Porter	Welsh–Ryan Arena (1,457); Evanston, IL
January 18, 2026; 3:00 p.m., BTN		Oregon	W 94–92 ^{2OT}	12–7 (4–4)	39 – Howell	8 – Uchenna	5 – Daniels	Kohl Center (4,147); Madison, WI
January 21, 2026; 6:30 p.m., B1G+		No. 24 Nebraska	W 63–60	13–7 (5–4)	22 – Uchenna	14 – Uchenna	2 – Tied	Kohl Center (3,549); Madison, WI
January 25, 2026; 2:00 p.m., B1G+		at Minnesota	L 53–88	13–8 (5–5)	16 – Howell	7 – McKinney	5 – Glenn	Williams Arena (5,749); Minneapolis, MN
January 29, 2026; 7:00 p.m., BTN		at No. 11 Ohio State	L 58–81	13–9 (5–6)	29 – Howell	12 – Uchenna	5 – Steele	Value City Arena (4,855); Columbus, OH
February 4, 2026; 6:30 p.m., B1G+		Indiana	L 74–77	13–10 (5–7)	15 – Tied	8 – Tied	5 – Daniels	Kohl Center (2,837); Madison, WI
February 8, 2026; 2:00 p.m., B1G+		No. 24 Washington	L 86–91 ^{OT}	13–11 (5–8)	28 – Howell	12 – Uchenna	10 – Porter	Kohl Center (3,630); Madison, WI
February 11, 2026; 6:00 p.m., B1G+		at Illinois	L 60–92	13–12 (5–9)	22 – Guyton	15 – Parchment	6 – Tied	State Farm Center (4,458); Champaign, IL
February 15, 2026; 5:00 p.m., BTN		Minnesota	L 60–83	13–13 (5–10)	18 – Daniels	8 – Uchenna	4 – Porter	Kohl Center (3,953); Madison, WI
February 19, 2026; 8:00 p.m., Peacock		at USC	L 59–66	13–14 (5–11)	13 – Tied	8 – Uchenna	12 – Porter	Galen Center (4,020); Los Angeles, CA
February 22, 2026; 4:30 p.m., Peacock		at No. 2 UCLA	L 60–80	13–15 (5–12)	16 – Iva Zaja	5 – Uchenna Okeke	3 – Tied	Pauley Pavilion (5,421); Los Angeles, CA
March 1, 2026; 2:00 p.m., B1G+		No. 9 Iowa	L 52–81	13–16 (5–13)	23 – Howell	8 – Daniels	6 – Bollin	Kohl Center (8,520); Madison, WI
Big Ten Women's Tournament
March 4, 2026; 5:00 p.m., Peacock	(15)	vs. (10) Illinois; First Round	L 70–82	13–17	24 – Uchenna	6 – Tied	5 – Porter	Gainbridge Fieldhouse; Indianapolis, IN
WBIT
March 19, 2025*; 8:00 p.m., ESPN+	(3)	at Oregon State; First Round	W 65–53	14–17	18 – Iva Zaja	7 – Daniels	6 – Porter	Gill Coliseum (2,014); Corvallis, OR
March 22, 2025*; 11:00 a.m., ESPN+	(3)	at (2) Miami (FL); Second Round	W 72–65	15–17	23 – Howell	13 – Daniels	7 – Tied	Watsco Center (486); Coral Gables, FL
March 26, 2026*; 6:30 p.m., ESPN+	(3)	(4) Harvard; Quarterfinals	W 64–61 ^{OT}	16–17	17 – Uchenna	9 – Uchenna	7 – Porter	Kohl Center (1,657); Madison, WI
March 30, 2026*; 1:30 p.m., ESPNU	(3)	vs. (2) Columbia; Semifinals	L 50–67	16–18	12 – Howell	7 – Uchenna	5 – Porter	Charles Koch Arena (1,771); Wichita, KS
*Non-conference game. ^{#}Rankings from AP Poll. (#) Tournament seedings in parentheses. All times are in Central.

== See also ==
- 2025–26 Wisconsin Badgers men's basketball team
