= 2025–26 Rutgers Scarlet Knights women's basketball team =

American college basketball season

2025–26 Rutgers Scarlet Knights women's basketball
- Conference: Big Ten Conference
- Record: 9–20 (1–17 Big Ten)
- Head coach: Coquese Washington (4th season)
- Associate head coach: Shannon Perry-LeBeauf
- Assistant coaches: Jeanine Wasielewski; Sean LeBeauf; Danielle Edwards; James Spinelli
- Home arena: Jersey Mike's Arena

2025–26 Big Ten women's basketball standings
	Conf.				Overall
Team	W		L	PCT	W		L	PCT
No. 1 UCLA †	18	–	0	1.000	37	–	1	.974
No. 7 Michigan	15	–	3	.833	28	–	7	.800
No. 16 Iowa	15	–	3	.833	27	–	7	.794
No. 17 Ohio State	13	–	5	.722	27	–	8	.771
No. 15 Minnesota	13	–	5	.722	24	–	9	.727
No. 20 Maryland	11	–	7	.611	24	–	9	.727
No. 22 Michigan State	11	–	7	.611	23	–	9	.719
No. 25 Washington	10	–	8	.556	22	–	11	.667
USC	9	–	9	.500	18	–	14	.563
Illinois	9	–	9	.500	22	–	12	.647
Oregon	8	–	10	.444	23	–	13	.639
Nebraska	7	–	11	.389	19	–	13	.594
Indiana	6	–	12	.333	18	–	14	.563
Purdue	5	–	13	.278	13	–	17	.433
Wisconsin	5	–	13	.278	16	–	18	.471
Penn State	4	–	14	.222	11	–	18	.379
Northwestern	2	–	16	.111	8	–	21	.276
Rutgers	1	–	17	.056	9	–	20	.310
† 2026 Big Ten tournament winner Rankings from AP poll

The 2025–26 Rutgers Scarlet Knights women's basketball team represented Rutgers University during the 2025–26 college basketball season. The Scarlet Knights are led by fourth-year head coach Coquese Washington, and played their games at the Jersey Mike's Arena in Piscataway, New Jersey as members of the Big Ten Conference.

The Scarlet Knights finished the season in last place in the Big Ten standings, and did not participate in the Big Ten women's basketball tournament. Coach Washington was removed from her position after four years after the end of the season.

== Previous season ==
The Scarlet Knights finished the 2024–25 season 11–19, 3–15 in Big Ten play to finish in a tie for 15th place. As the No. 15 seed in the Big Ten tournament, they lost to Nebraska in the first round. They received an at-large bid to the WNIT where they received a first round bye, defeated Army in the second round and Charleston in the Super 16 before losing Buffalo in the Great 8.

== Offseason ==
Shannon LeBeauf, a fourteen-year assistant coach at UCLA, departed Los Angeles to become the senior associate head coach for the Rutgers women's basketball team. Shannon's husband, Sean, also joined the Rutgers staff as Assistant Coach and Defensive Coordinator.

=== Departures ===
Rutgers Departures
Name	Num	Pos.	Height	Year	Hometown	Reason for Departure
Destiny Adams	1	G/F	6'3"	Senior	Manchester, NJ	Graduated
Lisa Thompson	2	G	5'9"	Sophomore	Joliet, IL	Transferred to Missouri
Mya Petticord	3	G	5'9"	Junior	Detroit, MI	Transferred to Auburn
Awa Sidibe	11	G	5'11"	Graduate Student	Bamako, Mali	Graduated
JoJo Lacey	14	G	6'1"	Graduate Student	Douglassvile, PA	Graduated
Kiyomi McMiller	32	G	5'8"	Freshman	Silver Spring, MD	Transferred to Penn State
Chyna Cornwell	54	C	6'3"	Graduate Student	Conover, NC	Graduated

=== Incoming transfers ===
Rutgers incoming transfers
Name	Num	Pos.	Height	Year	Hometown	Previous School
Lauryn Swann	1	G	5'7"	Sophomore	Queens, NY	Arizona
Kaylah Ivey	2	G	5'8"	Graduate Student	Forestville, MD	Boston College
Nene Ndiaye	10	F	6'1"	Junior	Saly, Senegal	Boston College
Faith Blackstone	12	G	6'0"	Graduate Student	Harrisburg, PA	Stephen F. Austin
Imani Lester	32	F	6'4"	(redshirt) Junior	Raleigh, NC	Kansas State

=== 2025 recruiting class ===
There was no recruiting class of 2025.

== Roster ==
2025–26 Rutgers Scarlet Knights women's basketball team
Players
Coaches

Pos.	#	Name	Height	Year	Previous school	Hometown
G	1	Lauryn Swann	5 ft 7 in (1.7 m)	So	Arizona	Queens, NY
G	2	Kaylah Ivey	5 ft 8 in (1.73 m)	GS	Boston College	Forestville, MD
G	3	Makylah Moore	6 ft 0 in (1.83 m)	Fr	Nazareth Regional High School	Brooklyn, NY
G/F	4	Antonia Bates	6 ft 3 in (1.91 m)	Sr	Rutgers Prep	Easton, PA
G	5	Deja Young (W)	5 ft 9 in (1.75 m)	Sr	Teaneck High School	Teaneck, NJ
F	7	Precious Gem Wheeler	6 ft 3 in (1.91 m)	Fr	Franklin High School	Franklin, NJ
F	10	Nene Ndiaye	6 ft 1 in (1.85 m)	Jr	Boston College	Saly, Senegal
G	12	Faith Blackstone	6 ft 0 in (1.83 m)	GS	Stephen F. Austin	Harrisburg, PA
F	22	Zachara Perkins	6 ft 3 in (1.91 m)	So	Summer Creek High School	Houston, TX
F	32	Imani Lester	6 ft 4 in (1.93 m)	RS Jr	Kansas State	Raleigh, NC
G	33	Kennedy Brandt (W)	5 ft 10 in (1.78 m)	Jr	Glenbard West High School	Glen Ellyn, IL
F	44	Janae Walker	6 ft 3 in (1.91 m)	Jr	Kentucky	Tyrone, GA

Head coach

- Coquese Washington (Notre Dame)

Assistant coach(es)

- Shannon Perry-LeBeauf (Iowa)
- Jeanine Wasielewski (Northwestern)
- Sean LeBeauf (Montevallo)
- Danielle Edwards (Clemson)
- James Spinelli (Temple)

Legend

- (C) Team captain
- (S) Suspended
- (I) Ineligible
- (W) Walk-on
- Injured
- Current redshirt

Roster

== Schedule and results ==
Date time, TV	Rank^{#}	Opponent^{#}	Result	Record	High points	High rebounds	High assists	Site (attendance) city, state
Regular season
November 3, 2025*; 7:00 p.m., B1G+		Wagner	W 79–50	1–0	17 – Lester	9 – Perkins	8 – Ivey	Jersey Mike's Arena (1,339); Piscataway, NJ
November 6, 2025*; 7:00 p.m., B1G+		Quinnipiac	W 64–55	2–0	23 – Ndiaye	9 – Tied	4 – Walker	Jersey Mike's Arena (1,548); Piscataway, NJ
November 9, 2025*; 2:00 p.m., B1G+		Stony Brook	L 54–71	2–1	16 – Ndiaye	6 – Walker	3 – Bates	Jersey Mike's Arena (1,623); Piscataway, NJ
November 13, 2025*; 11:00 a.m., B1G+		Rhode Island	W 68–63	3–1	24 – Ndiaye	10 – Walker	3 – Tied	Jersey Mike's Arena (6,829); Piscataway, NJ
November 16, 2025*; 2:00 p.m., B1G+		Fairleigh Dickinson	W 59–49	4–1	17 – Perkins	10 – Bates	3 – Ndiaye	Jersey Mike's Arena (2,194); Piscataway, NJ
November 20, 2025*; 7:00 p.m., SECN+/ESPN+		at Auburn	L 46–51	4–2	15 – Perkins	8 – Ndiaye	3 – Perkins	Neville Arena (2,706); Auburn, AL
November 24, 2025*; 7:00 p.m., B1G+		Siena	W 67–61	5–2	26 – Ndiaye	9 – Lester	6 – Ivey	Jersey Mike's Arena (1,757); Piscataway, NJ
November 28, 2025*; 7:00 p.m., B1G+		Northeastern	W 79–56	6–2	19 – Ndiaye	10 – Ndiaye	5 – Ivey	Jersey Mike's Arena (1,537); Piscataway, NJ
November 30, 2025*; 3:00 p.m., BTN		Saint Peter's	W 57–39	7–2	12 – Tied	7 – Tied	4 – Perkins	Jersey Mike's Arena (1,765); Piscataway, NJ
December 6, 2025; 6:00 p.m., FS1		No. 12 Iowa	L 36–79	7–3 (0–1)	11 – Perkins	8 – Ndiaye	2 – Tied	Jersey Mike's Arena (3,457); Piscataway, NJ
December 10, 2025*; 7:30 p.m., ESPN+		at Princeton; Rivalry	L 63–81	7–4	20 – Ndiaye	4 – Tied	4 – Ivey	Jadwin Gymnasium (1,186); Princeton, NJ
December 20, 2025*; 12:00 p.m., B1G+		Lafayette	W 54–45	8–4	22 – Blackstone	12 – Blackstone	5 – Ivey	Jersey Mike's Arena (1,761); Piscataway, NJ
December 28, 2025; 2:00 p.m., B1G+		at No. 24 Michigan State	L 64–70	8–5 (0–2)	16 – Ndiaye	7 – Tied	5 – Ivey	Breslin Center (5,034); East Lansing, MI
January 1, 2026; 2:00 p.m., B1G+		Wisconsin	L 63–70	8–6 (0–3)	17 – Perkins	8 – Bates	6 – Ivey	Jersey Mike's Arena (1,946); Piscataway, NJ
January 4, 2026; 2:00 p.m., BTN		at No. 19 Ohio State	L 49–71	8–7 (0–4)	15 – Blackstone	6 – Lester	5 – Ivey	Value City Arena (6,201); Columbus, OH
January 8, 2026; 7:00 p.m., B1G+		No. 8 Maryland	L 41–88	8–8 (0–5)	11 – Ndiaye	5 – Tied	3 – Tied	Jersey Mike's Arena (1,687); Piscataway, NJ
January 11, 2026; 3:00 p.m., B1G+		at Northwestern	L 54–73	8–9 (0–6)	11 – Tied	9 – Bates	1 – Tied	Welsh–Ryan Arena (1,531); Evanston, IL
January 18, 2026; 1:00 p.m., B1G+		at Penn State	W 76–72	9–9 (1–6)	20 – Ndiaye	8 – Lester	6 – Ivey	Rec Hall (1,838); State College, PA
January 22, 2026; 6:00 p.m., BTN		No. 7 Michigan	L 60–94	9–10 (1–7)	21 – Blackstone	6 – Tied	3 – Ndiaye	Jersey Mike's Arena (2,802); Piscataway, NJ
January 26, 2026; 3:00 p.m., B1G+		No. 25 Washington	L 48–76	9–11 (1–8)	14 – Lester	7 – Bates	4 – Ivey	Jersey Mike's Arena (3,323); Piscataway, NJ
January 28, 2026; 7:00 p.m., B1G+		Oregon	L 53–74	9–12 (1–9)	13 – Swann	5 – Tied	3 – Ndiaye	Jersey Mike's Arena (1,704); Piscataway, NJ
February 1, 2026; 5:00 p.m., B1G+		at USC	L 39–71	9–13 (1–10)	12 – Perkins	7 – Bates	7 – Ivey	Galen Center (5,504); Los Angeles, CA
February 4, 2026; 10:00 p.m., B1G+		at No. 2 UCLA	L 46–86	9–14 (1–11)	14 – Swann	4 – Tied	4 – Tied	Pauley Pavilion (2,895); Los Angeles, CA
February 8, 2026; 12:00 p.m., B1G+		Minnesota	L 52–63	9–15 (1–12)	26 – Ndiaye	6 – Tied	5 – Perkins	Jersey Mike's Arena (5,480); Piscataway, NJ
February 14, 2026; 12:00 p.m., B1G+		at Purdue	L 57–72	9–16 (1–13)	25 – Ndiaye	7 – Walker	4 – Perkins	Mackey Arena (6,452); West Lafayette, IN
February 17, 2026; 7:00 p.m., BTN		at Illinois	L 56–76	9–17 (1–14)	13 – Blackstone	7 – Walker	4 – Perkins	State Farm Center (4,373); Champaign, IL
February 21, 2026; 4:00 p.m., BTN		Penn State	L 78–87	9–18 (1–15)	17 – Lester	10 – Perkins	8 – Ivey	Jersey Mike's Arena (3,218); Piscataway, NJ
February 25, 2026; 7:00 p.m., B1G+		Indiana	L 69–79	9–19 (1–16)	15 – Perkins	4 – Tied	2 – Tied	Jersey Mike's Arena (2,739); Piscataway, NJ
February 28, 2026; 2:00 p.m., B1G+		at Nebraska	L 52–93	9–20 (1–17)	23 – Perkins	6 – Ndiaye	8 – Ivey	Pinnacle Bank Arena (5,856); Lincoln, NE
*Non-conference game. ^{#}Rankings from AP poll. (#) Tournament seedings in parentheses. All times are in Eastern.

== See also ==
- 2025–26 Rutgers Scarlet Knights men's basketball team
