= 2025–26 Northwestern Wildcats women's basketball team =

American college basketball season

2025–26 Northwestern Wildcats women's basketball
- Conference: Big Ten Conference
- Record: 8–21 (2–16 Big Ten)
- Head coach: Joe McKeown (18th season)
- Associate head coach: Tangela Smith
- Assistant coaches: Maggie Lyon; Brittany Johnson
- Home arena: Welsh–Ryan Arena

2025–26 Big Ten women's basketball standings
	Conf.				Overall
Team	W		L	PCT	W		L	PCT
No. 1 UCLA †	18	–	0	1.000	37	–	1	.974
No. 7 Michigan	15	–	3	.833	28	–	7	.800
No. 16 Iowa	15	–	3	.833	27	–	7	.794
No. 17 Ohio State	13	–	5	.722	27	–	8	.771
No. 15 Minnesota	13	–	5	.722	24	–	9	.727
No. 20 Maryland	11	–	7	.611	24	–	9	.727
No. 22 Michigan State	11	–	7	.611	23	–	9	.719
No. 25 Washington	10	–	8	.556	22	–	11	.667
USC	9	–	9	.500	18	–	14	.563
Illinois	9	–	9	.500	22	–	12	.647
Oregon	8	–	10	.444	23	–	13	.639
Nebraska	7	–	11	.389	19	–	13	.594
Indiana	6	–	12	.333	18	–	14	.563
Purdue	5	–	13	.278	13	–	17	.433
Wisconsin	5	–	13	.278	16	–	18	.471
Penn State	4	–	14	.222	11	–	18	.379
Northwestern	2	–	16	.111	8	–	21	.276
Rutgers	1	–	17	.056	9	–	20	.310
† 2026 Big Ten tournament winner Rankings from AP poll

The 2025–26 Northwestern Wildcats women's basketball team represented Northwestern University during the 2025–26 NCAA Division I women's basketball season. The Wildcats, led by head coach Joe McKeown in his 18th and final season, played their home games at the Welsh–Ryan Arena in Evanston, Illinois as members of the Big Ten Conference.

== Previous season ==
The Wildcats finished the 2024–25 season 9–18, 2–16 in Big Ten play to finish in 17th place. They failed to qualify for the Big Ten tournament.

Due to the wildfires in Los Angeles and Ventura counties, Northwestern's road games at UCLA on January 12 and USC on January 15 were postponed. Northwestern forfeited the games in February 2025. UCLA and USC each were credited with a win, and the Wildcats were assessed two losses.

== Offseason ==
=== Departures ===
Northwestern departures
Name	Num	Pos.	Height	Year	Hometown	Reason for departure
Kyla Jones	2	G	5'9"	Graduate student	Chicago, IL	Graduated
Caileigh Walsh	10	F	6'3"	Senior	Sparta, NJ	Graduated
Mercy Ademusayo	13	F	6'4"	Senior	Ode-Irele, Nigeria	Graduated
Melannie Daley	21	G	5'11"	Senior	Hastings-on-Hudson, NY	Transferred to Virginia Tech
Taylor Williams	33	F	6'2"	Graduate student	New Baltimore, MI	Graduated

=== Incoming transfers ===
Northwestern incoming transfers
Name	Num	Pos.	Height	Year	Hometown	Previous school
Tate Walters	4	G	5'9"	Graduate student	Buford, GA	Furman
DaiJa Turner	24	F	6'3"	(redshirt) Senior	Fayetteville, NC	TCU

== Recruiting ==
=== 2025 recruiting class ===
There was no recruiting class of 2025.

=== 2026 recruiting class ===
College recruiting (2026)
Name	Hometown	School	Height	Weight	Commit date
Xyanna Walton; G	Chicago, IL	Butler College Prep	5 ft 10 in (1.78 m)	N/A	
Xyanna Walton; G	Recruit ratings: ESPN: (92)				
Overall recruit ranking:
Note: In many cases, Scout, Rivals, 247Sports, On3, and ESPN may conflict in their listings of height and weight.; In these cases, the average was taken. ESPN grades are on a 100-point scale.; Sources: "2026 Player Commits". ESPN. Archived from the original on August 24, 2025.

== Roster ==
2025–26 Northwestern Wildcats women's basketball team
Players
Coaches

Pos.	#	Name	Height	Year	Previous school	Hometown
F	0	Rachel Mutombo	6 ft 3 in (1.91 m)	Jr	Good Counsel	Silver Spring, MD
G	1	Xamiya Walton	5 ft 7 in (1.7 m)	So	Butler College Prep	Chicago, IL
G	3	Claire Keswick (W)	6 ft 0 in (1.83 m)	So	Tabor Academy	Wrentham, MA
G	4	Tate Walters	5 ft 9 in (1.75 m)	GS	Furman	Buford, GA
G	7	Caroline Lau	5 ft 9 in (1.75 m)	Sr	St. Luke's School	Westport, CT
G/F	8	Kat Righeimer (W)	6 ft 1 in (1.85 m)	So	Sage Hill School	Costa Mesa, CA
F	9	Crystal Fuqu Wang	6 ft 2 in (1.88 m)	Jr	Sierra Canyon	Beijing, China
F	10	Sandra Moreno	6 ft 1 in (1.85 m)	Fr	Institut Frederic Mompou	Barcelona, Spain
G	11	Angelina Hodgens	5 ft 10 in (1.78 m)	Fr	St. Joseph By-The-Sea	Staten Island, NY
G	12	Casey Harter	5 ft 11 in (1.8 m)	Jr	Souderton	Harleysville, PA
G	14	Sammy White (W)	5 ft 6 in (1.68 m)	GS	Dulaney	Timonium, MD
F	22	Grace Sullivan	6 ft 4 in (1.93 m)	Sr	Bucknell	Antioch, IL
F	23	Tayla Thomas	6 ft 3 in (1.91 m)	So	IMG Academy	East Orange, NJ
F	24	DaiJa Turner	6 ft 3 in (1.91 m)	RS Sr	TCU	Fayetteville, NC
F	25	Lauren Trumpy	6 ft 5 in (1.96 m)	Sr	Trinity	Camp Hill, PA
G	33	Amparo López	5 ft 9 in (1.75 m)	Fr	Maristas Colegio Sagrado Corazón Valencia	Valencia, Spain

Head coach

- Joe McKeown (Kent State)

Assistant coach(es)

- Tangela Smith (Iowa)
- Maggie Lyon (Northwestern)
- Brittany Johnson (Ohio State)

Legend

- (C) Team captain
- (S) Suspended
- (I) Ineligible
- (W) Walk-on
- Injured
- Current redshirt

Roster

== Schedule and results ==
Date time, TV	Rank^{#}	Opponent^{#}	Result	Record	High points	High rebounds	High assists	Site (attendance) city, state
Exhibition
November 1, 2025*; 2:00 p.m., B1G+		Lewis	W 82–49	–	23 – Grace	10 – Tayla	9 – Caroline	Welsh–Ryan Arena; Evanston, IL
Regular season
November 5, 2025*; 7:00 p.m., B1G+		IU Indy	W 67–64	1–0	18 – Sullivan	18 – Sullivan	7 – Lau	Welsh–Ryan Arena (747); Evanston, IL
November 9, 2025*; 2:00 p.m., B1G+		SIU Edwardsville	W 64–51	2–0	25 – Sullivan	11 – Thomas	8 – Lau	Welsh–Ryan Arena (1,189); Evanston, IL
November 14, 2025*; 6:30 p.m., B1G+		Maryland Eastern Shore	W 69–54	3–0	18 – Harter	11 – Thomas	8 – Lau	Welsh–Ryan Arena (1,021); Evanston, IL
November 17, 2025*; 11:00 a.m., ESPN+		at DePaul	W 79–72	4–0	26 – Sullivan	18 – Thomas	9 – Lau	Wintrust Arena (9,526); Chicago, IL
November 21, 2025*; 6:30 p.m., B1G+		Cleveland State	W 75–68	5–0	20 – Sullivan	11 – Sullivan	12 – Lau	Welsh–Ryan Arena (938); Evanston, IL
November 28, 2025*; 11:00 a.m., Ion		vs. Abilene Christian; Fort Myers Tip-Off Shell Division	W 62–59	6–0	22 – Sullivan	12 – Thomas	9 – Lau	Suncoast Credit Union Arena; Fort Myers, FL
November 29, 2025*; 1:30 p.m., Ion		vs. Missouri; Fort Myers Tip-Off Shell Division	L 70–85	6–1	31 – Sullivan	13 – Sullivan	8 – Tied	Suncoast Credit Union Arena (593); Fort Myers, FL
December 3, 2025*; 7:00 p.m., B1G+		Kansas	L 62–74	6–2	24 – Sullivan	11 – Thomas	10 – Lau	Welsh–Ryan Arena (918); Evanston, IL
December 7, 2025; 1:00 p.m., BTN		No. 23 Ohio State	L 70–79	6–3 (0–1)	37 – Sullivan	8 – Sullivan	14 – Lau	Welsh–Ryan Arena (1,515); Evanston, IL
December 14, 2025*; 3:00 p.m., ESPN+		at Utah	L 66–91	6–4	21 – Sullivan	5 – Turner	10 – Lau	Jon M. Huntsman Center (2,217); Salt Lake City, UT
December 18, 2025*; 11:00 a.m., B1G+		Loyola Chicago	L 68–69	6–5	30 – Thomas	11 – Thomas	9 – Lau	Welsh–Ryan Arena (3,102); Evanston, IL
December 21, 2025*; 12:00 p.m., ESPN+		at George Washington	L 62–75	6–6	17 – Tied	8 – Lau	6 – Lau	Charles E. Smith Center (1,007); Washington, D.C.
December 29, 2025; 7:00 p.m., B1G+		at Washington	L 73–94	6–7 (0–2)	30 – Sullivan	8 – Sullivan	10 – Lau	Alaska Airlines Arena (4,092); Seattle, WA
January 1, 2026; 4:00 p.m., B1G+		at Oregon	L 54–87	6–8 (0–3)	23 – Sullivan	6 – Harter	10 – Lau	Matthew Knight Arena (4,195); Eugene, OR
January 5, 2026; 7:30 p.m., BTN		No. 14 Iowa	L 58–67	6–9 (0–4)	28 – Sullivan	7 – Sullivan	5 – Lau	Welsh–Ryan Arena (2,272); Evanston, IL
January 8, 2026; 7:00 p.m., B1G+		at Minnesota	L 47–79	6–10 (0–5)	16 – Walton	8 – Lau	7 – Lau	Williams Arena (3,865); Minneapolis, MN
January 11, 2026; 2:00 p.m., B1G+		Rutgers	W 73–54	7–10 (1–5)	21 – Harter	16 – Thomas	16 – Lau	Welsh–Ryan Arena (1,531); Evanston, IL
January 15, 2026; 7:00 p.m., B1G+		Wisconsin	W 66–61	8–10 (2–5)	19 – Sullivan	10 – Thomas	9 – Lau	Welsh–Ryan Arena (1,457); Evanston, IL
January 18, 2026; 2:00 p.m., B1G+		at No. 25 Illinois	L 71–74	8–11 (2–6)	21 – Sullivan	9 – Sullivan	7 – Lau	State Farm Center (5,068); Champaign, IL
January 25, 2026; 3:00 p.m., BTN		No. 3 UCLA	L 46–80	8–12 (2–7)	21 – Sullivan	8 – Lau	7 – Lau	Welsh–Ryan Arena (2,894); Evanston, IL
January 28, 2026; 7:00 p.m., B1G+		at Nebraska	L 73–89	8–13 (2–8)	19 – Thomas	8 – Thomas	4 – Lau	Pinnacle Bank Arena (4,784); Lincoln, NE
February 1, 2026; 1:00 p.m., B1G+		at Indiana	L 75–89	8–14 (2–9)	35 – Sullivan	7 – Sullivan	8 – Lau	Simon Skjodt Assembly Hall (8,515); Bloomington, IN
February 5, 2026; 8:00 p.m., BTN		USC	L 65–83	8–15 (2–10)	24 – Sullivan	6 – Tied	9 – Lau	Welsh–Ryan Arena (1,499); Evanston, IL
February 12, 2026; 8:00 p.m., Peacock		No. 7 Michigan	L 58–80	8–16 (2–11)	16 – Tied	5 – Thomas	6 – Lau	Welsh–Ryan Arena (1,636); Evanston, IL
February 15, 2026; 3:00 p.m., BTN		at Penn State	L 71–81	8–17 (2–12)	18 – Righeimer	7 – Sullivan	4 – Walton	Rec Hall (3,074); State College, PA
February 18, 2026; 5:30 p.m., B1G+		at No. 18 Michigan State	L 68–104	8–18 (2–13)	23 – Sullivan	7 – Lau	10 – Lau	Breslin Center (3,014); East Lansing, MI
February 22, 2026; 2:00 p.m., B1G+		Illinois	L 65–92	8–19 (2–14)	25 – Thomas	6 – Thomas	6 – Lau	Welsh–Ryan Arena (3,046); Evanston, IL
February 25, 2026; 5:30 p.m., B1G+		at No. 14 Maryland	L 57–79	8–20 (2–15)	23 – Sullivan	9 – Lau	4 – Tied	Xfinity Center (7,025); College Park, MD
March 1, 2026; 2:00 p.m., B1G+		Purdue	L 62–67	8–21 (2–16)	19 – Lau	6 – Thomas	13 – Lau	Welsh–Ryan Arena (2,181); Evanston, IL
*Non-conference game. ^{#}Rankings from AP poll. (#) Tournament seedings in parentheses. All times are in Central.

== See also ==
- 2025–26 Northwestern Wildcats men's basketball team
