= 2025–26 USC Trojans women's basketball team =

Basketball team season

2025–26 USC Trojans women's basketball

NCAA tournament, Second Round
- Conference: Big Ten Conference
- Record: 18–14 (9–9 Big Ten)
- Head coach: Lindsay Gottlieb (5th season)
- Associate head coach: Beth Burns (4th season)
- Assistant coaches: Willnett Crockett (3rd season); Courtney Jaco (3rd season); Nikki Blue (1st season)
- Home arena: Galen Center

2025–26 Big Ten women's basketball standings
	Conf.				Overall
Team	W		L	PCT	W		L	PCT
No. 1 UCLA †	18	–	0	1.000	37	–	1	.974
No. 7 Michigan	15	–	3	.833	28	–	7	.800
No. 16 Iowa	15	–	3	.833	27	–	7	.794
No. 17 Ohio State	13	–	5	.722	27	–	8	.771
No. 15 Minnesota	13	–	5	.722	24	–	9	.727
No. 20 Maryland	11	–	7	.611	24	–	9	.727
No. 22 Michigan State	11	–	7	.611	23	–	9	.719
No. 25 Washington	10	–	8	.556	22	–	11	.667
USC	9	–	9	.500	18	–	14	.563
Illinois	9	–	9	.500	22	–	12	.647
Oregon	8	–	10	.444	23	–	13	.639
Nebraska	7	–	11	.389	19	–	13	.594
Indiana	6	–	12	.333	18	–	14	.563
Purdue	5	–	13	.278	13	–	17	.433
Wisconsin	5	–	13	.278	16	–	18	.471
Penn State	4	–	14	.222	11	–	18	.379
Northwestern	2	–	16	.111	8	–	21	.276
Rutgers	1	–	17	.056	9	–	20	.310
† 2026 Big Ten tournament winner Rankings from AP poll

The 2025–26 USC Trojans women's basketball team represented the University of Southern California during the 2025–26 NCAA Division I women's basketball season. The Trojans were led by fifth-year head coach Lindsay Gottlieb, and played their home games at the Galen Center in Los Angeles, California. This marks the program's second season as a member of the Big Ten Conference.

== Previous season ==
The Trojans finished the 2024–25 season 31–4, 17–1 in Big Ten play to win the regular season Big Ten title. As the No. 1 seed in the Big Ten tournament, they defeated Indiana in the quarterfinals and Michigan in the semifinals before losing to UCLA in the championship game. They received an at-large bid to the NCAA tournament as the No. 1 seed in the Spokane Region 4, where they defeated UNC Greensboro and Mississippi State to advance to the sweet sixteen, where they defeated Kansas State before losing to national champion in a rematch of last year's elite eight to UConn.

== Offseason ==
=== Departures ===
USC departures
Name	Num	Pos.	Height	Year	Hometown	Reason for departure
Aaliyah Gayles	3	G	5'9"	(redshirt) Sophomore	Las Vegas, NV	Transferred to Utah State
Kayleigh Heckel	9	G	5'9"	Freshman	Port Chester, NY	Transferred to UConn
Rayah Marshall	13	F/C	6'4"	Senior	Los Angeles, CA	Graduated/2025 WNBA draft; selected 25th overall by Connecticut Sun
Dominique Darius	21	G	5'10"	(redshirt) Junior	Jacksonville, FL	Transferred to Syracuse
Avery Howell	23	G	6'0"	Freshman	Boise, ID	Transferred to Washington
Clarice Akunwafo	34	C	6'6"	Senior	Anambra State, Nigeria	Graduated
Kiki Iriafen	44	F	6'3"	Graduate student	Los Angeles, CA	Graduated/2025 WNBA draft; selected 4th overall by Washington Mystics
Talia von Oelhoffen	55	G	5'11"	Graduate student	Pasco, WA	Graduated

=== Incoming transfers ===
USC incoming transfers
Name	Num	Pos.	Height	Year	Hometown	Previous school
Londynn Jones	3	G	5'4"	Senior	Riverside, CA	UCLA
Yakiya Milton	7	F	6'4"	Junior	Jacksonville, FL	Auburn
Dayana Mendes	13	F	6'2"	Sophomore	Paris, France	Washington State
Kara Dunn	25	G	5'11"	Senior	Dallas, GA	Georgia Tech

=== 2025 recruiting class ===
College recruiting
Name	Hometown	School	Height	Weight	Commit date
Jazzy Davidson; G	Clackamas, OR	Clackamas High School	6 ft 1 in (1.85 m)	N/A	
Jazzy Davidson; G	Recruit ratings: ESPN: (98)				
Overall recruit ranking:
Note: In many cases, Scout, Rivals, 247Sports, On3, and ESPN may conflict in their listings of height and weight.; In these cases, the average was taken. ESPN grades are on a 100-point scale.; Sources: "2025 Player Commits". ESPN. Archived from the original on September 19, 2025.

=== 2026 recruiting class ===
College recruiting (2026)
Name	Hometown	School	Height	Weight	Commit date
Saniyah Hall; G	Lorain, OH	SPIRE Institute	6 ft 0 in (1.83 m)	N/A	
Saniyah Hall; G	Recruit ratings: ESPN: (98)				
Overall recruit ranking:
Note: In many cases, Scout, Rivals, 247Sports, On3, and ESPN may conflict in their listings of height and weight.; In these cases, the average was taken. ESPN grades are on a 100-point scale.; Sources: "2026 Player Commits". ESPN. Archived from the original on September 19, 2025.

== Roster ==
2025–26 USC Trojans women's basketball team
Players
Coaches

Pos.	#	Name	Height	Year	Previous school	Hometown
F	0	Vivian Iwuchukwu	6 ft 3 in (1.91 m)	So	Montverde Academy	Imo State, Nigeria
G	3	Londynn Jones	5 ft 4 in (1.63 m)	Sr	Centennial; UCLA	Riverside, CA
G	4	Rian Forestier	5 ft 11 in (1.8 m)	So	Brandeis	Helotes, TX
F	6	Laura Williams	6 ft 1 in (1.85 m)	RS Fr	St. Paul VI Catholic	Tampa, FL
F	7	Yakiya Milton	6 ft 5 in (1.96 m)	Jr	Mandarin; Auburn	Jacksonville, FL
F	8	Gerda Raulusaityte	6 ft 3 in (1.91 m)	Jr	Vilnius Ozas Gymnasium; LCC International	Varėna, Lithuania
G	9	Jazzy Davidson	6 ft 1 in (1.85 m)	Fr	Clackamas	Clackamas, OR
G	10	Malia Samuels	5 ft 6 in (1.68 m)	Jr	Garfield	Seattle, WA
G	11	Kennedy Smith	6 ft 1 in (1.85 m)	So	Etiwanda	Chino, CA
G	12	JuJu Watkins (injured) (redshirt)	6 ft 2 in (1.88 m)	Jr	Sierra Canyon	Los Angeles, CA
F	13	Dayana Mendes	6 ft 3 in (1.91 m)	So	INSEP; Washington State	Paris, France
G	24	Brooklyn Shamblin	5 ft 9 in (1.75 m)	So	Oaks Christian	Carpinteria, CA
G	25	Kara Dunn	5 ft 11 in (1.8 m)	Sr	Mount Paran Christian; Georgia Tech	Dallas, GA

Head coach

- Lindsay Gottlieb (Brown)

Assistant coach(es)

- Beth Burns (Ohio Wesleyan)
- Wilnett Crockett (Connecticut)
- Courtney Jaco (USC)
- Nikki Blue (UCLA)

Legend

- (C) Team captain
- (S) Suspended
- (I) Ineligible
- (W) Walk-on
- Injured
- Current redshirt

Roster

== Schedule and results ==
Date time, TV	Rank^{#}	Opponent^{#}	Result	Record	High points	High rebounds	High assists	Site city, state
Regular season
November 4, 2025*; 7:00 p.m., B1G+	No. 18	New Mexico State	W 87–48	1–0	14 – Davidson	9 – Raulusaityte	4 – Tied	Galen Center (3,971); Los Angeles, CA
November 9, 2025*; 12:00 p.m., ESPN	No. 18	vs. No. 9 NC State; Ally Tipoff	W 69–68	2–0	21 – Davidson	8 – Smith	4 – Davidson	Spectrum Center (5,208); Charlotte, NC
November 15, 2025*; 6:00 p.m., FOX	No. 8	vs. No. 2 South Carolina; The Real SC	L 52–69	2–1	12 – Smith	5 – Dunn	4 – Smith	Crypto.com Arena (8,150); Los Angeles, CA
November 18, 2025*; 7:00 p.m., B1G+	No. 11	Portland	W 78–51	3–1	19 – Davidson	12 – Milton	5 – Davidson	Galen Center (2,947); Los Angeles, CA
November 21, 2025*; 3:00 p.m., ESPN	No. 11	at No. 24 Notre Dame	L 59–61	3–2	21 – Dunn	8 – Davidson	5 – Smith	Joyce Center (8,342); South Bend, IN
November 25, 2025*; 7:00 p.m., B1G+	No. 18	Tennessee Tech	W 85–44	4–2	20 – Tied	16 – Davidson	5 – Smith	Galen Center (3,012); Los Angeles, CA
November 28, 2025*; 2:00 p.m., B1G+	No. 18	Pepperdine	W 82–52	5–2	19 – Dunn	4 – Tied	7 – Smith	Galen Center (3,866); Los Angeles, CA
December 2, 2025*; 7:00 p.m., B1G+	No. 16	Saint Mary's	W 79–33	6–2	17 – Jones	5 – Dunn	6 – Davidson	Galen Center (2,361); Los Angeles, CA
December 7, 2025; 5:00 p.m., BTN	No. 16	No. 21 Washington	W 59–50	7–2 (1–0)	22 – Davidson	12 – Davidson	4 – Tied	Galen Center (6,137); Los Angeles, CA
December 13, 2025*; 2:30 p.m., FOX	No. 16	No. 1 UConn	L 51–79	7–3	16 – Smith	7 – Smith	5 – Dunn	Galen Center (9,035); Los Angeles, CA
December 18, 2025*; 7:00 p.m., B1G+	No. 19	Cal Poly	W 86–39	8–3	28 – Jones	9 – Davidson	7 – Samuels	Galen Center (3,511); Los Angeles, CA
December 21, 2025*; 5:30 p.m., ESPN	No. 19	vs. California; Invisalign Bay Area Women's Classic	W 61–57	9–3	24 – Davidson	6 – Tied	3 – Samuels	Chase Center (6,258); San Francisco, CA
December 29, 2025; 12:00 p.m., B1G+	No. 17	at No. 20 Nebraska	W 74–66	10–3 (2–0)	17 – Tied	9 – Smith	6 – Smith	Pinnacle Bank Arena (6,285); Lincoln, NE
January 3, 2026; 5:00 p.m., Peacock	No. 17	at No. 4 UCLA; Rivalry	L 46–80	10–4 (2–1)	11 – Dunn	5 – Smith	4 – Smith	Pauley Pavilion (11,241); Los Angeles, CA
January 6, 2026; 7:00 p.m., BTN	No. 21	Oregon	L 66–71	10–5 (2–2)	21 – Dunn	13 – Davidson	5 – Davidson	Galen Center (4,259); Los Angeles, CA
January 11, 2026; 12:00 p.m., B1G+	No. 21	at Minnesota	L 62–63	10–6 (2–3)	27 – Dunn	8 – Davidson	6 – Samuels	Williams Arena (5,514); Minneapolis, MN
January 15, 2026; 6:00 p.m., Peacock		No. 12 Maryland	L 55–62	10–7 (2–4)	21 – Dunn	5 – Tied	5 – Tied	Galen Center (4,645); Los Angeles, CA
January 18, 2026; 2:00 p.m., B1G+		Purdue	W 83–57	11–7 (3–4)	29 – Dunn	5 – Dunn	6 – Tied	Galen Center (5,464); Los Angeles, CA
January 22, 2026; 5:00 p.m., BTN		at No. 13 Michigan State	L 68–74	11–8 (3–5)	23 – Dunn	6 – Tied	4 – Tied	Breslin Center (4,123); East Lansing, MI
January 25, 2026; 11:00 a.m., BTN		at No. 7 Michigan	L 67–73	11–9 (3–6)	26 – Dunn	10 – Dunn	7 – Davidson	Crisler Center (4,692); Ann Arbor, MI
January 29, 2026; 6:00 p.m., Peacock		No. 8 Iowa	W 81–69	12–9 (4–6)	25 – Dunn	12 – Dunn	8 – Davidson	Galen Center (4,303); Los Angeles, CA
February 1, 2026; 2:00 p.m., B1G+		Rutgers	W 71–39	13–9 (5–6)	18 – Dunn	11 – Williams	5 – Davidson	Galen Center (5,504); Los Angeles, CA
February 5, 2026; 6:00 p.m., BTN		at Northwestern	W 83–65	14–9 (6–6)	21 – Davidson	11 – Smith	6 – Davidson	Welsh–Ryan Arena (1,499); Evanston, IL
February 8, 2026; 10:00 a.m., B1G+		at Illinois	W 70–62	15–9 (7–6)	27 – Davidson	10 – Williams	8 – Davidson	State Farm Center (15,544); Champaign, IL
February 12, 2026; 7:00 p.m., BTN		Indiana	W 79–73	16–9 (8–6)	24 – Davidson	9 – Williams	3 – Tied	Galen Center (4,124); Los Angeles, CA
February 19, 2026; 6:00 p.m., Peacock		Wisconsin	W 66–59	17–9 (9–6)	24 – Davidson	14 – Williams	6 – Davidson	Galen Center (4,020); Los Angeles, CA
February 22, 2026; 11:00 a.m., FS1		at No. 10 Ohio State	L 83–88	17–10 (9–7)	32 – Davidson	7 – Williams	4 – Tied	Value City Arena (8,144); Columbus, OH
February 25, 2026; 3:00 p.m., B1G+		at Penn State	L 82–85	17–11 (9–8)	24 – Dunn	6 – Tied	5 – Davidson	Rec Hall (1,650); State College, PA
March 1, 2026; 3:00 p.m., FS1		No. 2 UCLA; Rivalry	L 50–73	17–12 (9–9)	12 – Davidson	7 – Williams	3 – Jones	Galen Center (8,841); Los Angeles, CA
Big Ten Women's Tournament
March 5, 2026; 9:00 a.m., BTN	(9)	vs. (8) Washington; Second Round	L 64–76	17–13	19 – Jones	13 – Williams	3 – Tied	Gainbridge Fieldhouse; Indianapolis, IN
NCAA Women's Tournament
March 21, 2026*; 12:30 p.m., ESPN2	(9 S4)	vs. (8 S4) Clemson; First Round	W 71–67 ^{OT}	18–13	31 – Davidson	6 – Tied	5 – Davidson	Colonial Life Arena; Columbia, SC
March 23, 2026*; 5:00 p.m., ESPN	(9 S4)	vs. (1 S1) No. 4 South Carolina; Second Round	L 61–101	18–14	20 – Jones	4 – Tied	2 – Tied	Colonial Life Arena (10,879); Columbia, SC
*Non-conference game. ^{#}Rankings from AP Poll. (#) Tournament seedings in parentheses. Sacramento 4=S4. All times are in Pacific Time.

Source: USCTrojans.com

== Game summaries ==
This section will be filled in as the season progresses.

=== vs New Mexico State ===
BTN+

November 4, 2025
7:00 p.m. PST

Recap

New Mexico State Aggies 48, No. 18 USC Trojans 87
Scoring by quarter: 13-20, 10-25, 16-20, 9-20
Pts: Lucia Yenes - 27; Rebs: Lucia Yenes - 5 Asts: Emma Christiano - 4	Pts: Londynn Jones - 16; Rebs: Kara Dunn - 8 Asts: Tied - 4

Galen Center • Los Angeles, California
Attendance: 3,971
Referees: Teresa Turner, Maj Forsberg, Lisa Jones

=== No. 9 NC State (Ally Tipoff) ===
ESPN

November 9, 2025
12:00 p.m. PST

Recap

No. 18 USC Trojans 69, No. 9 NC State Wolfpack 68
Scoring by quarter: 18-20, 15-14, 17-24, 19-10
Pts: Jazzy Davidson - 21; Rebs: Kennedy Smith - 8 Asts: Jazzy Davidson - 4	Pts: Zoe Brooks - 24; Rebs: Khamil Pierre - 18; Asts: Zoe Brooks - 6

Spectrum Center • Charlotte, North Carolina
Attendance: 5,208
Referees: Kristen Bell, Melissa Barlow, Gina Gross

=== South Carolina (The Real SC) ===
FOX

November 15, 2025
6:00 p.m. PST

Recap

South Carolina Gamecocks 69, USC Trojans 52
Scoring by quarter: 20-14, 12-14, 23-15, 14-7
Pts: Joyce Edwards - 17; Rebs: Madina Okot - 15; Asts: Tied - 4	Pts: Kennedy Smith - 11; Rebs: Kara Dunn - 5 Asts: Kennedy Smith - 4

Crypto.com Arena • Los Angeles, California
Attendance: 8,150
Referees: Brian Garland, Timothy Greene, Brenda Pantja

=== vs Portland ===
BTN+

November 18, 2025
7:00 p.m. PST

Recap

Portland Pilots 51, USC Trojans 78
Scoring by quarter: 14-10, 9-24, 17-18, 11-26
Pts: Lainey Spear - 11; Rebs: Florence Dallow - 8 Asts: Tied -	Pts: Jazzy Davidson - 19; Rebs: Yakiya Milton - 12; Asts: Jazzy Davidson - 5

Galen Center • Los Angeles, California
Attendance: 2,947
Referees: Kyle Bacon, Julie Krommenhoek, Brian Hall

=== at No. 24 Notre Dame ===
ESPN

November 21, 2025
3:00 p.m. PST

USC Trojans vs. Notre Dame Fighting Irish

Joyce Center • South Bend, Indiana

=== vs Tennessee Tech ===
BTN+

November 25, 2025
7:00 p.m. PST

Tennessee Tech Golden Eagles vs. USC Trojans

Galen Center • Los Angeles, California

=== vs Pepperdine ===
BTN+

November 28, 2025
2:00 p.m. PST

Pepperdine Waves vs. USC Trojans

Galen Center • Los Angeles, California

=== vs Saint Mary's ===
BTN+

December 2, 2025
7:00 p.m. PST

Saint Mary's Gaels vs. USC Trojans

Galen Center • Los Angeles, California

=== vs No. 21 Washington ===
BTN

December 7, 2025
5:00 p.m. PST

Washington Huskies vs. USC Trojans

Galen Center • Los Angeles, California

=== vs No. 1 UConn ===
FOX

December 13, 2025
2:30 p.m. PST

UConn Huskies vs. USC Trojans

Galen Center • Los Angeles, California

=== vs Cal Poly ===
BTN+

December 18, 2025
7:00 p.m. PST

Cal Poly Mustangs vs. USC Trojans

Galen Center • Los Angeles, California

=== California (Invisalign Bay Area Women's Classic) ===
ESPN2

December 21, 2025
5:30 p.m. PST

USC Trojans vs. California Golden Bears

Chase Center • San Francisco, California

=== at No. 20 Nebraska ===
BTN+

December 29, 2025
12:00 p.m. PST

USC Trojans vs. Nebraska Cornhuskers

Pinnacle Bank Arena • Lincoln, Nebraska

=== at No. 4 UCLA (rivalry) ===
Peacock

January 3, 2026
5:00 p.m. PST

USC Trojans vs. UCLA Bruins

Pauley Pavilion • Los Angeles, California

=== vs Oregon ===
BTN

January 6, 2026
7:00 p.m. PST

Oregon Ducks vs. USC Trojans

Galen Center • Los Angeles, California

=== at Minnesota ===
BTN+

January 11, 2026
12:00 p.m. PST

USC Trojans vs. Minnesota Golden Gophers

Williams Arena • Minneapolis, Minnesota

=== vs No. 12 Maryland ===
Peacock

January 15, 2026
6:00 p.m. PST

Maryland Terrapins vs. USC Trojans

Galen Center • Los Angeles, California

=== vs Purdue ===
BTN+

January 18, 2026
2:00 p.m. p.m. PST

Purdue Boilermakers vs. USC Trojans

Galen Center • Los Angeles, California

=== at No. 13 Michigan State ===
BTN

January 22, 2026
5:00 p.m. PST

USC Trojans vs. Michigan State Spartans

Breslin Center • East Lansing, Michigan

=== vs No. 2 UCLA (rivalry) ===
FS1

March 1, 2026
3:00 p.m. PST

UCLA Bruins vs. USC Trojans

Galen Center • Los Angeles, California

=== (8) Washington (Big Ten Tournament - second round) ===
BTN

March 5, 2026
9:00 a.m. PST

USC Trojans vs. Washington Huskies

Gainbridge Fieldhouse • Indianapolis, Indiana

=== (9 S4) Clemson (NCAA Tournament - first round) ===
ESPN2

March 21, 2026
12:30 p.m. PST

USC Trojans vs. Clemson Tigers

Colonial Life Arena • Columbia, South Carolina

== Player statistics ==
Individual player statistics
			Minutes		Scoring		Total FGs			3-point FGs			Free-throws			Rebounds							
Player	GP	GS	Tot	Avg	Pts	Avg	FG	FGA	Pct	3FG	3FGA	Pct	FT	FTA	Pct	Off	Def	Tot	Avg	A	Stl	Blk	TO

== Rankings ==
Ranking movements Legend: ██ Increase in ranking ██ Decrease in ranking — = Not ranked RV = Received votes
	Week																				
Poll	Pre	1	2	3	4	5	6	7	8	9	10	11	12	13	14	15	16	17	18	19	Final
AP	18	8	11	18	16	16	19	17	17*	21	RV	—	—	RV	—	—	RV				Not released
Coaches	16	10	11	18	18	17	19	16	16	21	RV	RV	—	—	—	—					

*AP did not release a week 8 poll.

== See also ==
- 2025–26 USC Trojans men's basketball team
