= 2026 Missouri Valley Conference women's basketball tournament =

American college basketball postseason tournament

- Classification: Division I
- Season: 2025–26
- Teams: 11
- Site: Xtream Arena; Coralville, Iowa
- Champions: Murray State (2nd title)
- Winning coach: Rechelle Turner (2nd title)
- MVP: Halli Poock (Murray State)
- Television: ESPN2, ESPN+

2025–26 Missouri Valley Conference women's basketball standings
	Conf.				Overall
Team	W		L	PCT	W		L	PCT
Murray State †	19	–	1	.950	31	–	4	.886
Belmont	16	–	4	.800	20	–	12	.625
Illinois State	13	–	7	.650	24	–	14	.632
Northern Iowa	13	–	7	.650	18	–	14	.563
Bradley	13	–	7	.650	20	–	13	.606
Drake	10	–	10	.500	12	–	20	.375
UIC	9	–	11	.450	14	–	18	.438
Southern Illinois	7	–	13	.350	10	–	20	.333
Indiana State	5	–	15	.250	10	–	22	.313
Evansville	5	–	15	.250	10	–	25	.286
Valparaiso	0	–	20	.000	0	–	32	.000
† 2026 MVC tournament winner

The 2026 Missouri Valley Conference Women's Basketball Tournament, was a postseason women's basketball tournament that completed the 2025–26 season in the Missouri Valley Conference. The tournament was held at the Xtream Arena for the first time in Coralville, Iowa March 12-15, 2026.

== Seeds ==
Teams are seeded by their conference record.

Two-way ties are broken by utilizing head-to-head record; should a tie still remain, the NCAA Evaluation Tool (NET) rankings the day following all conference teams having completed their regular season will be used.

Three (or more) way ties are broken by first determining the cumulative record for each tied team versus the other teams with the same conference record. Should any teams still remain tied (and there are more than two), the cumulative record would again be used on those remaining teams; should any teams still remain (and there are only two), the two-way approach would be leveraged.

Seed	School	Conference Record	Tiebreaker (1)
1	Murray State	19–1	
2	Belmont	16–4	
3	Illinois State	13–7	3–1 vs. Northern Iowa and Bradley
4	Northern Iowa	13–7	2–2 vs. Illinois State and Bradley
5	Bradley	13–7	1–3 vs. Illinois State and Northern Iowa
6	Drake	10–10	
7	UIC	9–11	
8	Southern Illinois	7–13	
9	Indiana State	5–15	2–0 vs. Evansville
10	Evansville	5–15	0–2 vs. Indiana State
11	Valparaiso	0–20	

== Schedule ==
Session	Game	Time *	Matchup	Score	Attendance	Television
Opening Round – March 12
I	1	3:30 pm	No. 8 Southern Illinois vs. No. 9 Indiana State	69–81	912	ESPN+
I	2	6:00 pm	No. 7 UIC vs. No. 10 Evansville	71–76	912	ESPN+
I	3	8:30 pm	No. 6 Drake vs. No. 11 Valparaiso	55–81	912	ESPN+
Quarterfinals – March 13
II	4	12:00 pm	No. 1 Murray State vs. No. 9 Indiana State	105–88	1,074	ESPN+
II	5	2:30 pm	No. 4 Northern Iowa vs. No. 5 Bradley	74–73	1,074	ESPN+
III	6	6:00 pm	No. 2 Belmont vs. No. 10 Evansville	63–76	954	ESPN+
III	7	8:30 pm	No. 3 Illinois State vs. No. 6 Drake	69–62	954	ESPN+
Semifinals – March 14
IV	8	1:30 pm	No. 1 Murray State vs. No. 4 Northern Iowa	72-59	1,382	ESPN+
IV	9	4:00 pm	No. 3 Illinois State vs. No. 10 Evansville	70-75^{OT}	1,382	ESPN+
Final – March 15
V	10	1:00 p.m.	No. 1 Murray State vs. No. 10 Evansville	91–70	854	ESPN2
* Game times in Central Time Zone; rankings denote tournament seed.

== Bracket ==
Opening Round; March 12; ESPN+
8	Southern Illinois	69
9	Indiana State	81
7	UIC	71
10	Evansville	76
6	Drake	81
11	Valparaiso	55

Quarterfinals; March 13; ESPN+
1	Murray State	105
9	Indiana State	88
4	Northern Iowa	74
5	Bradley	73
2	Belmont	63
10	Evansville	76
3	Illinois State	69
6	Drake	62

Semifinals; March 14; ESPN+
1	Murray State	72
4	Northern Iowa	59
10	Evansville	80*
3	Illinois State	75

Final; March 15; ESPN2
1	Murray State	91
10	Evansville	70

* denotes overtime period
