= 2025–26 Maryland Terrapins women's basketball team =

American college basketball season

2025–26 Maryland Terrapins women's basketball
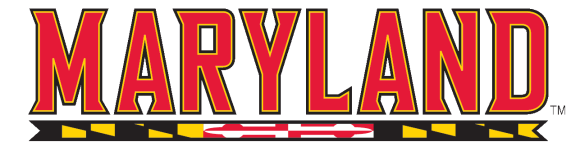

NCAA tournament, Second Round
- Conference: Big Ten Conference

Ranking
- Coaches: No. 19
- AP: No. 20
- Record: 24–9 (11–7 Big Ten)
- Head coach: Brenda Frese (24th season)
- Assistant coaches: Carley Kuhns (1st season); Kaitlynn Fratz (8th season); Lindsey Spann (6th season); Jessica Imhof (1st season); Noelle Cobb (1st season)
- Home arena: Xfinity Center

2025–26 Big Ten women's basketball standings
	Conf.				Overall
Team	W		L	PCT	W		L	PCT
No. 1 UCLA †	18	–	0	1.000	37	–	1	.974
No. 7 Michigan	15	–	3	.833	28	–	7	.800
No. 16 Iowa	15	–	3	.833	27	–	7	.794
No. 17 Ohio State	13	–	5	.722	27	–	8	.771
No. 15 Minnesota	13	–	5	.722	24	–	9	.727
No. 20 Maryland	11	–	7	.611	24	–	9	.727
No. 22 Michigan State	11	–	7	.611	23	–	9	.719
No. 25 Washington	10	–	8	.556	22	–	11	.667
USC	9	–	9	.500	18	–	14	.563
Illinois	9	–	9	.500	22	–	12	.647
Oregon	8	–	10	.444	23	–	13	.639
Nebraska	7	–	11	.389	19	–	13	.594
Indiana	6	–	12	.333	18	–	14	.563
Purdue	5	–	13	.278	13	–	17	.433
Wisconsin	5	–	13	.278	16	–	18	.471
Penn State	4	–	14	.222	11	–	18	.379
Northwestern	2	–	16	.111	8	–	21	.276
Rutgers	1	–	17	.056	9	–	20	.310
† 2026 Big Ten tournament winner Rankings from AP poll

The 2025–26 Maryland Terrapins women's basketball team represented the University of Maryland, College Park during the 2025–26 NCAA Division I women's basketball season. The Terrapins are led by head coach Brenda Frese in her 24th season, and played their home games at the Xfinity Center in College Park, Maryland as a member of the Big Ten Conference.

== Previous season ==
The Terrapins finished the 2024–25 season 25–8, 13–5 in Big Ten play to finish in a tie for fourth place. As the No. 4 seed in the Big Ten tournament, they lost in the quarterfinals to Michigan. They received an at-large bid to the NCAA tournament as the No. 4 seed in the Birmingham 2 region. They defeated Norfolk State and Alabama in the first and second rounds to advanced to the sweet sixteen where they lost to South Carolina.

== Offseason ==
=== Departures ===
Maryland departures
Name	Number	Pos.	Height	Year	Hometown	Reason for departure
Shyanne Sellers	0	G	6'2"	Senior	Aurora, OH	Graduated/2025 WNBA draft; selected 17th overall by Golden State Valkyries
Sarah Te-Biasu	1	G	5'5"	Graduate Student	Montreal, QC	Graduated
Emily Fisher	3	G	6'0"	Sophomore	Libertyville, IL	Transferred to Nebraska
Christina Dalce	15	F	6'2"	Senior	Edison, NJ	Graduated
Emma Chardon	21	F	6'2"	(redshirt) Junior	Geneva, Switzerland	Graduated
Amari DeBerry	42	F	6'6"	Senior	Williamsville, NY	Graduated

=== Incoming transfers ===
Maryland transfers
Name	Num	Pos.	Height	Year	Hometown	Previous school
Oluchi Okananwa	7	G	5'10"	Junior	Boston, MA	Duke
Yarden Garzon	12	G	6'3"	Senior	Ra'anana, Israel	Indiana

=== Recruiting classes ===
==== 2025 recruiting class ====
College recruiting
Name	Hometown	School	Height	Weight	Commit date
Rainey Welson; G	Hortonville, WI	Hortonville High School	5 ft 9 in (1.75 m)	N/A	
Rainey Welson; G	Recruit ratings: ESPN: (95)				
Addison Mack; PG	Eden Prairie, MN	Minnehaha Academy	5 ft 9 in (1.75 m)	N/A	
Addison Mack; PG	Recruit ratings: ESPN: (91)				
Overall recruit ranking:
Note: In many cases, Scout, Rivals, 247Sports, On3, and ESPN may conflict in their listings of height and weight.; In these cases, the average was taken. ESPN grades are on a 100-point scale.; Sources: "2025 Player Commits". ESPN. Archived from the original on July 30, 2025.

== Roster ==
2025–26 Maryland Terrapins women's basketball team
Players
Coaches

Pos.	#	Name	Height	Year	Previous school	Hometown
G	0	Rainey Welson	5 ft 10 in (1.78 m)	Fr	Hortonville	Greenville, WI
G	1	Lea Bartelme	5 ft 8 in (1.73 m)	Fr		Kisovec, Slovenia
G	2	Kaylene Smikle	6 ft 0 in (1.83 m)	Sr	Westtown School; Rutgers	Bay Shore, NY
G	3	Addi Mack	5 ft 9 in (1.75 m)	Fr	Minnehaha Academy	Minneapolis, MN
G/F	5	Ava McKennie	6 ft 2 in (1.88 m)	So	McDonogh School	McSherrystown, PA
G	6	Saylor Poffenbarger	6 ft 2 in (1.88 m)	RS Sr	Middletown; Arkansas	Middletown, MD
G	7	Oluchi Okananwa	5 ft 10 in (1.78 m)	Jr	Worcester Academy; Duke	Boston, MA
G	8	Kyndal Walker	5 ft 9 in (1.75 m)	So	St. John's College	Beltsville, MD
F	9	Isimenme Ozzy-Momodou	6 ft 3 in (1.91 m)	Sr	Gulf Coast State	London, England
G/F	10	Mir McLean	5 ft 11 in (1.8 m)	GS	Roland Park Country School; Virginia	Baltimore, MD
F	11	Marya Boiko	6 ft 4 in (1.93 m)	Fr		Minsk, Belarus
G	12	Yarden Garzon	6 ft 3 in (1.91 m)	Sr	Ostrovsky; Indiana	Ra'anana, Israel
F	21	Nicole Fritea	6 ft 2 in (1.88 m)	Fr		Arad, Romania
G	24	Bri McDaniel	5 ft 10 in (1.78 m)	Sr	Kenwood Academy	Chicago, IL
F	40	Breanna Williams	6 ft 2 in (1.88 m)	So	Skyview	Billings, MT

Head coach

- Brenda Frese (Arizona)

Assistant coach(es)

- Carley Kuhns (Valdosta State)
- Kaitlynn Fratz (California (PA))
- Lindsey Spann (Penn State)
- Jessica Imhof (TCNJ)
- Noelle Cobb (La Verne)

Legend

- (C) Team captain
- (S) Suspended
- (I) Ineligible
- (W) Walk-on
- Injured
- Current redshirt

Roster

== Schedule and results ==
Date time, TV	Rank^{#}	Opponent^{#}	Result	Record	High points	High rebounds	High assists	Site (attendance) city, state
Exhibition
October 26, 2025*; 2:00 p.m.	No. 10	vs. No. 9 NC State; The Bad Boy Mowers Series Exhibition	L 75–83		21 – Okananwa	13 – Poffenbarger	4 – Mack	First Horizon Coliseum (8,000); Greensboro, NC
October 30, 2025*; 6:00 p.m., B1G+	No. 10	Point Park	W 120–35		19 – Okananwa	11 – Ozzy-Momodu	6 – Tied	Xfinity Center; College Park, MD
Regular season
November 3, 2025*; 7:00 p.m., B1G+	No. 10	Loyola (MD)	W 80–26	1–0	18 – Okananwa	5 – Tied	6 – Garzon	Xfinity Center (5,614); College Park, MD
November 6, 2025*; 6:00 p.m., B1G+	No. 10	UMBC	W 87–54	2–0	15 – Tied	7 – Boiko	7 – Bartelme	Xfinity Center (5,462); College Park, MD
November 9, 2025*; 1:00 p.m., B1G+	No. 10	Georgetown	W 85–66	3–0	23 – Mack	12 – Poffenbarger	5 – Poffenbarger	Xfinity Center (6,263); College Park, MD
November 13, 2025*; 7:00 p.m., B1G+	No. 9	Towson	W 88–70	4–0	15 – Mack	8 – Okananwa	6 – Mack	Xfinity Center (4,940); College Park, MD
November 16, 2025*; 1:00 p.m., B1G+	No. 9	Princeton	W 84–68	5–0	20 – Okananwa	7 – Ozzy-Momodu	4 – Tied	Xfinity Center (6,748); College Park, MD
November 20, 2025*; 6:00 p.m., B1G+	No. 9	Bethune–Cookman	W 95–59	6–0	13 – Tied	8 – Williams	5 – Garzon	Xfinity Center (4,920); College Park, MD
November 23, 2025*; 2:30 p.m., BTN	No. 9	George Mason	W 84–62	7–0	23 – Okananwa	9 – Garzon	5 – Okananwa	Xfinity Center (7,402); College Park, MD
November 26, 2025*; 6:30 p.m., FloHoops	No. 7	vs. No. 16 Kentucky; Puerto Rico Shootout	W 74–66	8–0	22 – Smikle	6 – Tied	6 – Mack	Roberto Clemente Coliseum (250); San Juan, PR
November 27, 2025*; 4:00 p.m., FloHoops	No. 7	vs. Hofstra; Puerto Rico Shootout	W 95–38	9–0	13 – Smikle	5 – McKennie	4 – Poffenbarger	Roberto Clemente Coliseum (250); San Juan, PR
December 3, 2025*; 7:00 p.m., B1G+	No. 7	Mount St. Mary's	W 92–44	10–0	17 – Okananwa	7 – Williams	8 – Walker	Xfinity Center (4,872); College Park, MD
December 7, 2025; 4:00 p.m., BTN	No. 7	at Minnesota	W 100–99 ^{2OT}	11–0 (1–0)	30 – Poffenbarger	10 – Poffenbarger	9 – Garzon	Williams Arena (4,854); Minneapolis, MN
December 10, 2025*; 6:00 p.m., B1G+	No. 7	Delaware State	W 91–21	12–0	18 – Tied	11 – Ozzy-Momodu	6 – Walker	Xfinity Center (5,340); College Park, MD
December 19, 2025*; 11:00 a.m., B1G+	No. 7	Central Connecticut	W 98–30	13–0	25 – Garzon	10 – Okananwa	6 – Tied	Xfinity Center (17,300); College Park, MD
December 29, 2025; 4:00 p.m., B1G+	No. 7	Wisconsin	W 97–59	14–0 (2–0)	28 – Okananwa	9 – Ozzy-Momodou	4 – Walker	Xfinity Center (7,580); College Park, MD
January 1, 2026; 4:00 p.m., BTN	No. 7	at Illinois	L 70–73	14–1 (2–1)	17 – Garzon	8 – Poffenbarger	6 – Poffenbarger	State Farm Center (5,207); Champaign, IL
January 4, 2026; 6:00 p.m., BTN	No. 7	Indiana	W 82–67	15–1 (3–1)	34 – Okananwa	15 – Ozzy-Momodu	6 – Poffenbarger	Xfinity Center (6,600); College Park, MD
January 8, 2026; 7:00 p.m., B1G+	No. 8	at Rutgers	W 88–41	16–1 (4–1)	18 – Garzon	12 – Ozzy-Momodu	9 – Garzon	Jersey Mike's Arena (1,687); Piscataway, NJ
January 11, 2026; 4:00 p.m., Peacock	No. 8	No. 19 Ohio State	L 76–89	16–2 (4–2)	27 – Okananwa	9 – Okananwa	6 – Poffenbarger	Xfinity Center (8,623); College Park, MD
January 15, 2026; 9:00 p.m., Peacock	No. 12	at USC	W 62–55	17–2 (5–2)	12 – Mack	9 – Ozzy-Momodu	4 – Garzon	Galen Center (4,645); Los Angeles, CA
January 18, 2026; 4:00 p.m., NBC	No. 12	at No. 3 UCLA	L 67–97	17–3 (5–3)	25 – Okananwa	5 – Tied	4 – Walker	Pauley Pavilion (8,721); Los Angeles, CA
January 22, 2026; 6:00 p.m., Peacock	No. 15	No. 10 Iowa	L 78–85 ^{OT}	17–4 (5–4)	18 – Ozzy-Momodu	12 – Tied	5 – Mack	Xfinity Center (6,514); College Park, MD
January 28, 2026; 7:00 p.m., B1G+	No. 16	No. 25 Washington	L 80–83 ^{2OT}	17–5 (5–5)	24 – Garzon	16 – Ozzy-Momodu	4 – Poffenbarger	Xfinity Center (6,425); College Park, MD
January 31, 2026; 5:00 p.m., BTN	No. 16	Oregon	L 61–68	17–6 (5–6)	27 – Okananwa	8 – Poffenbarger	2 – Tied	Xfinity Center (9,364); College Park, MD
February 4, 2026; 6:30 p.m., B1G+	No. 22	at No. 12 Michigan State	W 86–70	18–6 (6–6)	23 – Okananwa	8 – Poffenbarger	5 – Okananwa	Breslin Center (3,423); East Lansing, MI
February 7, 2026; 2:00 p.m., BTN	No. 22	at Nebraska	W 78–60	19–6 (7–6)	16 – Ozzy-Momodu	9 – Tied	6 – Garzon	Pinnacle Bank Arena (6,113); Lincoln, NE
February 12, 2026; 7:00 p.m., Peacock	No. 20	Penn State	W 81–62	20–6 (8–6)	19 – Garzon	11 – Poffenbarger	6 – Okananwa	Xfinity Center (7,015); College Park, MD
February 15, 2026; 2:00 p.m., FS1	No. 20	at No. 8 Ohio State	W 76–75	21–6 (9–6)	17 – Tied	11 – Poffenbarger	4 – Tied	Value City Arena (7,504); Columbus, OH
February 22, 2026; 1:00 p.m., B1G+	No. 14	Purdue	W 99–66	22–6 (10–6)	26 – Okananwa	9 – Poffenbarger	7 – Garzon	Xfinity Center (9,032); College Park, MD
February 25, 2026; 6:30 p.m., B1G+	No. 14	Northwestern	W 79–57	23–6 (11–6)	25 – Okananwa	13 – Poffenbarger	4 – Poffenbarger	Xfinity Center (7,025); College Park, MD
February 28, 2026; 2:30 p.m., FOX	No. 14	at No. 8 Michigan	L 69–87	23–7 (11–7)	19 – Okananwa	5 – Ozzy-Momodu	3 – Tied	Crisler Center (5,212); Ann Arbor, MI
Big Ten tournament
March 5, 2026; 9:00 p.m., BTN	(6) No. 14	vs. (11) Oregon; Second Round	L 68–73	23–8	27 – Okananwa	6 – Poffenbarger	6 – Garzon	Gainbridge Fieldhouse (5,149); Indianapolis, IN
NCAA tournament
March 20, 2026*; 3:00 p.m., ESPNU	(5 FW1) No. 17	vs. (12 FW1) Murray State; First Round	W 99–67	24–8	20 – Walker	14 – McLean	5 – Poffenbarger	Carmichael Arena; Chapel Hill, NC
March 22, 2026*; 12:00 p.m., ESPN	(5 FW1) No. 17	at (4 FW1) No. 15 North Carolina; Second Round	L 66–74	24–9	21 – Okananwa	14 – McLean	1 – Tied	Carmichael Arena (2,470); Chapel Hill, NC
*Non-conference game. ^{#}Rankings from AP Poll. (#) Tournament seedings in parentheses. Fort Worth 1=FW1. All times are in Eastern Time.

== Rankings ==
Ranking movements Legend: ██ Increase in ranking ██ Decrease in ranking
	Week																				
Poll	Pre	1	2	3	4	5	6	7	8	9	10	11	12	13	14	15	16	17	18	19	Final
AP	10	9	9	7	7	7	7	7	7*	8	12	15	16	22	20	14	14	14	17	17	20
Coaches	10	7	6	6	6	6	6	6	6	8	11	13	16	19	17	15	13	13	16	16	19

*AP did not release a week 8 poll.
