= 2025–26 Valparaiso Beacons women's basketball team =

American college basketball season

2025–26 Valparaiso Beacons women's basketball
- Conference: Missouri Valley Conference
- Record: 0–32 (0–20 MVC)
- Head coach: Courtney Boyd (1st season)
- Assistant coaches: Brooke Bailey; Jasmine Hackett; Andrew Whitt; Dale Linderwell
- Home arena: Athletics–Recreation Center

2025–26 Missouri Valley Conference women's basketball standings
	Conf.				Overall
Team	W		L	PCT	W		L	PCT
Murray State †	19	–	1	.950	31	–	4	.886
Belmont	16	–	4	.800	20	–	12	.625
Illinois State	13	–	7	.650	24	–	14	.632
Northern Iowa	13	–	7	.650	18	–	14	.563
Bradley	13	–	7	.650	20	–	13	.606
Drake	10	–	10	.500	12	–	20	.375
UIC	9	–	11	.450	14	–	18	.438
Southern Illinois	7	–	13	.350	10	–	20	.333
Indiana State	5	–	15	.250	10	–	22	.313
Evansville	5	–	15	.250	10	–	25	.286
Valparaiso	0	–	20	.000	0	–	32	.000
† 2026 MVC tournament winner

The 2025–26 Valparaiso Beacons women's basketball team represented Valparaiso University during the 2025–26 NCAA Division I women's basketball season. The Beacons, who were led by first-year head coach Courtney Boyd, played their home games at the Athletics–Recreation Center in Valparaiso, Indiana as members of the Missouri Valley Conference.

On March 18, 2025, longtime women's basketball head coach Mary Evans and Valparaiso mutually agreed to part ways. On April 4, Quincy women's basketball head coach Courtney Boyd stepped down to become the head coach at Valparaiso. The former NAIA National Champion saw success during her brief stint at the Division II level with the Quincy Hawks before taking her first Division I job with the Beacons.

The Beacons would finish the first season of the Courtney Boyd era with a winless season and a final record of 0–32, the worst in NCAA college basketball history (men or women's). Only 4 of those losses were decided by single digits.

== Previous season ==
The Beacons finished the 2024–25 season 13–19, 9–11 in MVC play, to finish in eighth place. They were defeated by Bradley in the opening round of the MVC tournament.

== Preseason ==
On October 22, 2025, the MVC released its preseason coaches poll. Valparaiso was not ranked in the top four slots, which were the only rankings revealed by the conference.

=== Preseason rankings ===
MVC preseason poll
Predicted finish	Team	Votes (1st place)
1	Belmont	446 (25)
2	Murray State	436 (13)
3	Illinois State	387 (2)
4	Drake	371 (4)

=== Preseason Honors ===
"Players to Watch" List
Player	Position	Year	Hometown
Fiona Connolly	Guard	Senior	South Burlington, VT
Maci Rhoades	Guard	Senior	Beavercreek, OH

== Roster ==
2025–26 Valparaiso Beacons women's basketball team
Players
Coaches

Pos.	#	Name	Height	Year	Previous school	Hometown
G	1	Allia von Schlegell	5 ft 5 in (1.65 m)	Fr	Nazareth Academy	Downers Grove, IL
G	2	Maci Rhoades	5 ft 11 in (1.8 m)	Sr	Radford	Beavercreek, OH
G	3	Isabella Anderson	5 ft 7 in (1.7 m)	Fr	Milbank High School	Milbank, SD
G	4	Fiona Connolly	5 ft 8 in (1.73 m)	Sr	La Salle	South Burlington, VT
G	5	Raeven Raye-Redmond	5 ft 6 in (1.68 m)	RS So	Trotwood-Madison High School	Trotwood, OH
G	9	Mor Shabtai	5 ft 4 in (1.63 m)	So	Hapoel Petah Tikva	Tel Aviv, Israel
G	10	Autumn Dibb	5 ft 10 in (1.78 m)	Fr	Muskego High School	Muskego, WI
G/F	11	Kennedy Sproule	6 ft 1 in (1.85 m)	Jr	Bay College	Niverville, MB
G	20	Mikayla Huffine	5 ft 4 in (1.63 m)	Sr	Quincy	Rockford, IL
F	21	Milana Nenadic	6 ft 3 in (1.91 m)	RS Jr	Idaho State	Kitchener, ON
G/F	22	Nuala Connolly	5 ft 11 in (1.8 m)	Fr	Reserve	South Burlington, VT
G	23	Bella Swedlund	5 ft 8 in (1.73 m)	RS Jr	Toledo	Winner, SD
F	24	Kayla Preston	6 ft 0 in (1.83 m)	Jr	Millard North High School	Omaha, NE
F	25	Kayla Sullivan	5 ft 11 in (1.8 m)	Jr	State Fair CC	St. Louis, MO
F	33	Kylie Waytashek	6 ft 2 in (1.88 m)	So	Royalton High School	Royalton, MN
C	42	Kamryn Winch	6 ft 3 in (1.91 m)	RS Jr	Maryville	Bonne Terre, MO

Head coach

- Courtney Boyd (Utah Tech)

Assistant coach(es)

- Brooke Bailey (Truman State)
- Jasmine Hackett (Sioux Falls)
- Andrew Whitt (Ohio)
- Dale Linderwell (Iowa Wesleyan)

Legend

- (C) Team captain
- (S) Suspended
- (I) Ineligible
- (W) Walk-on
- Injured
- Current redshirt

Roster
Last update: February 15, 2026

== Schedule and results ==
Date time, TV	Rank^{#}	Opponent^{#}	Result	Record	High points	High rebounds	High assists	Site (attendance) city, state
Exhibition
October 29, 2025*; 5:00 pm		Grace College	W 89–70	–	17 – Tied	7 – Tied	5 – Hamlet	Athletics–Recreation Center (307); Valparaiso, IN
Regular Season
November 4, 2025*; 6:00 pm, ESPN+		at DePaul	L 54–92	0–1	12 – Connolly	11 – Winch	2 – Tied	Wintrust Arena (1,050); Chicago, IL
November 8, 2025*; 12:00 pm, ESPN+		at Detroit Mercy	L 48–78	0–2	19 – Connolly	9 – Connolly	4 – Huffine	Calihan Hall (300); Detroit, MI
November 12, 2025*; 6:30 pm, ESPN+		at No. 16 Iowa State	L 50–97	0–3	20 – Nenadic	8 – Winch	4 – Shabtai	Hilton Coliseum (8,954); Ames, IA
November 16, 2025*; 4:00 pm, ESPN+		Milwaukee	L 67–72 ^{OT}	0–4	15 – von Schlegell	12 – Winch	4 – von Schlegell	Athletics-Recreation Center (276); Valparaiso, IN
November 21, 2025*; 7:00 pm, MC23		at South Dakota	L 44–85	0–5	16 – Connolly	5 – Huffine	1 – Tied	Sanford Coyote Sports Center (1,428); Vermillion, SD
November 26, 2025*; 2:00 pm, YouTube		vs. Radford; CSU Invitational	L 61–68	0–6	21 – Connolly	8 – Connolly	4 – Huffine	Woodling Gym (237); Cleveland, OH
November 28, 2025*; 12:00 pm, ESPN+		vs. Cleveland State; CSU Invitational	L 41–80	0–7	14 – Connolly	8 – Winch	3 – Winch	Woodling Gym (306); Cleveland, OH
November 29, 2025*; 12:00 pm, YouTube		vs. St. Bonaventure; CSU Invitational	L 55–87	0–8	18 – Waytashek	7 – Connolly	3 – Huffine	Woodling Gym (299); Cleveland, OH
December 7, 2025; 3:00 pm, ESPN+		UIC	L 44–61	0–9 (0–1)	16 – Shabtai	9 – Shabtai	2 – Tied	Athletics–Recreation Center (237); Valparaiso, IN
December 12, 2025*; 6:00 pm, ESPN+		SIUE	L 69–76	0–10	18 – von Schlegell	6 – Dibb	4 – Connolly	Athletics-Recreation Center (203); Valparaiso, IN
December 14, 2025*; 12:00 pm, ESPN+		at Western Michigan	L 48–58	0–11	18 – von Schlegell	10 – Nenadic	4 – Dibb	University Arena (623); Kalamazoo, MI
December 17, 2025*; 6:00 pm, ESPN+		Central Michigan	L 41–91	0–12	14 – von Schlegell	9 – Shabtai	3 – Shabtai	Athletics–Recreation Center (209); Valparaiso, IN
December 29, 2025; 1:00 pm, ESPN+		Northern Iowa	L 52–86	0–13 (0–2)	10 – Connolly	9 – Winch	2 – Tied	Athletics-Recreation Center (335); Valparaiso, IN
January 1, 2026; 1:00 pm, ESPN+		at Indiana State	L 78–88	0–14 (0–3)	21 – Connolly	9 – Winch	7 – Huffine	Hulman Center (997); Terre Haute, IN
January 3, 2026; 3:00 pm, ESPN+		at Evansville	L 46–66	0–15 (0–4)	19 – von Schlegell	4 – Tied	5 – Huffine	Meeks Family Fieldhouse (283); Evansville, IN
January 8, 2026; 6:00 pm, ESPN+		Bradley	L 44–80	0–16 (0–5)	15 – Preston	6 – Preston	3 – Shabtai	Athletics-Recreation Center (254); Valparaiso, IN
January 10, 2026; 2:00 pm, ESPN+		at Southern Illinois	L 59–97	0–17 (0–6)	15 – von Schlegell	7 – Nenadic	3 – Connolly	Banterra Center (421); Carbondale, IL
January 15, 2026; 6:30 pm, ESPN+		at Illinois State	L 74–93	0–18 (0–7)	34 – Nenadic	6 – Nenadic	5 – von Schlegell	CEFCU Arena (1,627); Normal, IL
January 18, 2026; 1:00 pm, ESPN+		Drake	L 56–66	0–19 (0–8)	18 – Nenadic	5 – Tied	4 – Huffine	Athletics-Recreation Center (310); Valparaiso, IN
January 23, 2026; 6:00 pm, ESPN+		at Bradley	L 39–79	0–20 (0–9)	10 – Nenadic	6 – Sullivan	2 – Sullivan	Renaissance Coliseum (820); Peoria, IL
January 29, 2026; 11:00 am, ESPN+		Indiana State	L 63–77	0–21 (0–10)	19 – Nenadic	12 – Nenadic	4 – Dibb	Athletics-Recreation Center (845); Valparaiso, IN
January 31, 2026; 2:00 pm, ESPN+		at UIC	L 57–76	0–22 (0–11)	19 – von Schlegell	12 – Winch	3 – von Schlegell	Credit Union 1 Arena (577); Chicago, IL
February 5, 2026; 6:00 pm, ESPN+		Evansville	L 59–83	0–23 (0–12)	16 – von Schlegell	8 – Dibb	5 – Huffine	Athletics–Recreation Center (388); Valparaiso, IN
February 7, 2026; 1:00 pm, ESPN+		Southern Illinois	L 73–82	0–24 (0–13)	29 – von Schlegell	12 – Nenadic	5 – Connolly	Athletics–Recreation Center (275); Valparaiso, IN
February 13, 2026; 6:00 pm, ESPN+		at Murray State	L 69–95	0–25 (0–14)	22 – von Schlegell	6 – Nenadic	3 – Dibb	CFSB Center; Murray, KY
February 15, 2026; 2:00 pm, ESPN+		at Belmont	L 37–77	0–26 (0–15)	11 – Connolly	9 – Connolly	4 – Huffine	Curb Event Center (824); Nashville, TN
February 19, 2026; 6:00 pm, ESPN+		at Drake	L 68–79	0–27 (0–16)	20 – Connolly	7 – Nenadic	6 – Huffine	Knapp Center (1,911); Des Moines, IA
February 26, 2026; 6:00 pm, ESPN+		at Northern Iowa	L 54–92	0–28 (0–17)	20 – Connolly	6 – Preston	3 – Huffine	McLeod Center (2,362); Cedar Falls, IA
February 28, 2026; 1:00 pm, ESPN+		Illinois State	L 42–83	0–29 (0–18)	13 – Connolly	6 – Tied	4 – Huffine	Athletics-Recreation Center (385); Valparaiso, IN
March 5, 2026; 6:00 pm, ESPN+		Belmont	L 63–83	0–30 (0–19)	18 – Nenadic	10 – Tied	5 – Connolly	Athletics–Recreation Center (210); Valparaiso, IN
March 7, 2026; 1:00 pm, ESPN+		Murray State	L 68–100	0–31 (0–20)	23 – Connolly	9 – Nenadic	3 – Tied	Athletics–Recreation Center (311); Valparaiso, IN
MVC tournament
March 12, 2026; 8:30 p.m., ESPN+	(11)	vs. (6) Drake; First Round	L 55–81	0–32	14 – Connolly	7 – Winch	3 – Connolly	Xtream Arena (912); Coralville, IA
*Non-conference game. ^{#}Rankings from AP Poll. (#) Tournament seedings in parentheses. All times are in Central.

== See also ==
- 2025–26 Valparaiso Beacons men's basketball team
