= Rechelle Turner =

American college basketball coach

Current position
- Title: Head coach
- Team: Murray State
- Conference: MVC
- Record: 167–113 (.596)

Biographical details
- Born: June 5, 1973 (age 53); Calvert City, Kentucky

Playing career
- 1991–1994: Murray State

Coaching career (HC unless noted)
- 1997–2017: Murray HS
- 2017–present: Murray State

Head coaching record
- Overall: 167–113 (.596)
- Tournaments: 0–2 (NCAA); 0–2 (WNIT)

Accomplishments and honors

Championships
- 2 MVC tournament (2025, 2026); 2 MVC regular season (2025, 2026)

Awards
- MVC Coach of the Year (2026)

Rechelle Turner is an American college basketball coach who is the current head coach of the Murray State Racers women's basketball team.

== Career ==
Turner played basketball for Murray State as a student. She began coaching basketball with the girls' team at Murray High School; she led the team for 21 years and won the Class A state championship in 2016. In 2017, Murray State named her as the head coach of its women's basketball team.

Turner won her 121st game with the Racers against UIC on January 12, 2025, setting a team record. The Racers won the Missouri Valley Conference tournament and appeared in the NCAA tournament in both the 2024–25 and 2025–26 seasons, and Turner was awarded MVC Coach of the Year in 2026.

== Head coaching record ==
Record table
Season	Team	Overall	Conference	Standing	Postseason
Murray State (Ohio Valley Conference) (2017–2022)
2017–18	Murray State	11–19	7–11	8th	
2018–19	Murray State	13–17	9–9	6th	
2019–20	Murray State	14–16	7–11	8th	
2020–21	Murray State	16–11	12–8	6th	
2021–22	Murray State	22–10	13–5	3rd	WNIT 1st Round
Murray State (Missouri Valley Conference) (2022–present)
2022–23	Murray State	15–16	7–13	8th	
2023–24	Murray State	20–12	12–8	6th	WNIT 2nd Round
2024–25	Murray State	25–8	16–4	1st	NCAA 1st Round
2025–26	Murray State	31–4	19–1	1st	NCAA 1st Round
Murray State:		167–113 (.596)			
Total:		167–113 (.596)			
National champion Postseason invitational champion Conference regular season champion Conference regular season and conference tournament champion Division regular season champion Division regular season and conference tournament champion Conference tournament champion
