= 2025–26 Illinois State Redbirds women's basketball team =

American college basketball season

2025–26 Illinois State Redbirds women's basketball

WNIT, Runners-up
- Conference: Missouri Valley Conference
- Record: 24–14 (13–7 MVC)
- Head coach: Kristen Gillespie (9th season)
- Associate head coach: Scott Gillespie
- Assistant coaches: Drew Cole; Katrina Robinson; Jordan Alford; Mannie Robinson
- Home arena: CEFCU Arena

2025–26 Missouri Valley Conference women's basketball standings
	Conf.				Overall
Team	W		L	PCT	W		L	PCT
Murray State †	19	–	1	.950	31	–	4	.886
Belmont	16	–	4	.800	20	–	12	.625
Illinois State	13	–	7	.650	24	–	14	.632
Northern Iowa	13	–	7	.650	18	–	14	.563
Bradley	13	–	7	.650	20	–	13	.606
Drake	10	–	10	.500	12	–	20	.375
UIC	9	–	11	.450	14	–	18	.438
Southern Illinois	7	–	13	.350	10	–	20	.333
Indiana State	5	–	15	.250	10	–	22	.313
Evansville	5	–	15	.250	10	–	25	.286
Valparaiso	0	–	20	.000	0	–	32	.000
† 2026 MVC tournament winner

The 2025–26 Illinois State Redbirds women's basketball team represented Illinois State University during the 2025–26 NCAA Division I women's basketball season. The Redbirds, led by ninth-year head coach Kristen Gillespie, played their home games at CEFCU Arena in Normal, Illinois as members of the Missouri Valley Conference.

== Previous season ==
The Redbirds finished the 2024–25 season 24–13, 14–6 in MVC play, to finish in fifth place. They defeated Southern Illinois, before falling to Drake in the quarterfinals of the MVC tournament. They received an at-large bid to the WNIT, where they defeated Western Illinois in the second round, Abilene Christian in the Super 16, and Louisiana Tech in the Great 8, before falling to eventual tournament runners-up Troy in the Fab 4.

== Preseason ==
On October 22, 2025, the Missouri Valley Conference released their preseason poll. Illinois State was picked to finish third in the conference, receiving two out of a 44 possible first-place votes. Only the top 4 vote getters were released.

=== Preseason rankings ===
MVC Preseason Poll
Place	Team	Votes
1	Belmont	446 (25)
2	Murray State	436 (13)
3	Illinois State	387 (2)
4	Drake	371 (4)
(#) first-place votes

=== MVC "Players to Watch" ===
MVC "Players to Watch"
Player	Year	Position
Addison Martin	(redshirt) Senior	Forward
Nevaeh Thomas	Junior	Forward

== Roster ==
2025–26 Illinois State Redbirds women's basketball team
Players
Coaches

Pos.	#	Name	Height	Year	Previous school	Hometown
G/F	2	De'Shawnti Thomas	5 ft 10 in (1.78 m)	RS Sr	Old Dominion	Tulsa, Oklahoma
G	3	Trista Fayta	5 ft 8 in (1.73 m)	So	Notre Dame Academy	Green Bay, Wisconsin
G	4	Jaeden Pratt	5 ft 10 in (1.78 m)	Fr	Ankeny Centennial High School	Ankeny, Iowa
G	5	Morgan Bruno	5 ft 11 in (1.8 m)	So	Loyola Academy	Chicago, Illinois
F	8	Madison Austin	6 ft 3 in (1.91 m)	Fr	Sterling High School	Sterling, Illinois
G	11	Kya Hurt	5 ft 8 in (1.73 m)	Fr	Lawrence North High School	Indianapolis, Indiana
G	12	Jordan Fenske	5 ft 11 in (1.8 m)	Fr	Waukesha West High School	Waukesha, Wisconsin
G	15	Taylor Veach	5 ft 11 in (1.8 m)	Sr	Central DeWitt High School	DeWitt, Iowa
F	21	Nevaeh Thomas	6 ft 1 in (1.85 m)	Jr	Evansville	Kenosha, Wisconsin
F	22	Doneelah Washington	6 ft 1 in (1.85 m)	So	Lincoln Northeast High School	Lincoln, Nebraska
G	23	Grace Nelson	5 ft 10 in (1.78 m)	RS Fr	Altamont High School	Altamont, Illinois
F	24	Addison Martin	6 ft 1 in (1.85 m)	RS Sr	Abilene Christian	Shreveport, Louisiana
G	32	Zanyra Adams	5 ft 9 in (1.75 m)	RS So	Cisco College	San Antonio, Texas
G	33	Bella Finnegan	6 ft 0 in (1.83 m)	Sr	Indiana State	Hometown, Illinois

Head coach

- Kristen Gillespie (NC State)

Assistant coach(es)

- Scott Gillespie (Ripon)
- Drew Cole (Aurora)
- Katrina Robinson (Illinois State)
- Jordan Alford (Columbia (MO))
- Mannie Robinson (Talladega)

Legend

- (C) Team captain
- (S) Suspended
- (I) Ineligible
- (W) Walk-on
- Injured
- Current redshirt

Roster
Last update: September 15, 2026

== Schedule and results ==
Date time, TV	Rank^{#}	Opponent^{#}	Result	Record	Site (attendance) city, state
Exhibition
October 26, 2025*; 2:00 pm		Illinois Wesleyan	W 89–46	–	CEFCU Arena; Normal, IL
Regular season
November 3, 2025*; 6:30 pm, ESPN+		Dayton	W 87–76	1–0	CEFCU Arena (1,429); Normal, IL
November 9, 2025*; 12:00 pm, B1G+		at Illinois	L 65–75	1–1	State Farm Center (4,849); Champaign, IL
November 12, 2025*; 11:00 am, ESPN+		Chicago State	W 101–52	2–1	CEFCU Arena (7,629); Normal, IL
November 18, 2025*; 6:00 pm, ESPN+		at Loyola Chicago	W 59–44	3–1	Joseph J. Gentile Arena (566); Chicago, IL
November 21, 2025*; 6:30 pm, ESPN+		Saint Louis	W 81–75	4–1	CEFCU Arena (1,721); Normal, IL
November 26, 2025*; 11:30 am		vs. Rice; Puerto Rico Shootout	L 72−75 ^{OT}	4−2	Coliseo Guillermo Angulo (250); San Juan, PR
November 27, 2025*; 9:00 am		vs. East Carolina; Puerto Rico Shootout	L 66−73	4−3	Coliseo Guillermo Angulo (250); San Juan, PR
November 28, 2025*; 9:00 am		vs. Wake Forest; Puerto Rico Shootout	L 44–57	4–4	Coliseo Guillermo Angulo (250); San Juan, PR
December 3, 2025; 6:00 pm, ESPN+		at Northern Iowa	L 54–68	4–5 (0–1)	McLeod Center (2,131); Cedar Falls, IA
December 7, 2025*; 2:00 pm, ESPN+		Eastern Illinois	W 64–46	5–5	CEFCU Arena (2,099); Normal, IL
December 14, 2025*; 11:00 am, B1G+		at No. 24 Nebraska	L 44–85	5–6	Pinnacle Bank Arena (4,943); Lincoln, NE
December 19, 2025*; 6:30 pm, ESPN+		Oakland	W 89–66	6–6	CEFCU Arena (1,682); Normal, IL
December 29, 2025; 6:30 pm, ESPN+		Indiana State	W 105−64	7−6 (1–1)	CEFCU Arena (1,622); Normal, IL
January 2, 2026; 6:00 pm, ESPN+		at Murray State	L 93–101 ^{2OT}	7–7 (1–2)	CFSB Center (1,857); Murray, KY
January 4, 2026; 1:00 pm, ESPN+		at Belmont	L 68–75	7–8 (1–3)	Curb Event Center (1,333); Nashville, TN
January 8, 2026; 6:30 pm, ESPN+		UIC	W 75–61	8–8 (2–3)	CEFCU Arena (1,638); Normal, IL
January 11, 2026; 2:00 pm, ESPN+		Evansville	W 82–71	9–8 (3–3)	CEFCU Arena (1,754); Normal, IL
January 15, 2026; 6:30 pm, ESPN+		Valparaiso	W 93–74	10–8 (4–3)	CEFCU Arena (1,627); Normal, IL
January 22, 2026; 7:00 pm, ESPN+		at UIC	L 64–76	10–9 (4–4)	Credit Union 1 Arena (942); Chicago, IL
January 25, 2026; 1:00 pm, ESPN+		at Indiana State	W 85–69	11–9 (5–4)	Hulman Center (212); Terre Haute, IN
January 29, 2026; 6:00 pm, ESPN+		Northern Iowa	W 59–55	12–9 (6–4)	CEFCU Arena (1,739); Normal, IL
February 1, 2026; 2:00 pm, ESPN+		Bradley; I-74 Rivalry	W 58–54 ^{OT}	13–9 (7–4)	CEFCU Arena (2,815); Normal, IL
February 7, 2026; 4:00 pm, ESPN+		Drake	W 77–70	14–9 (8–4)	CEFCU Arena (2,183); Normal, IL
February 13, 2026; 6:00 pm, ESPN+		at Southern Illinois	L 60–84	14–10 (8–5)	Banterra Center (525); Carbondale, IL
February 15, 2026; 3:00 pm, ESPN+		at Evansville	W 88–75	15–10 (9–5)	Meeks Family Fieldhouse (398); Evansville, IN
February 20, 2026; 6:30 pm, ESPN+		Belmont	W 83–78 ^{OT}	16–10 (10–5)	CEFCU Arena (2,369); Normal, IL
February 22, 2026; 2:00 pm, ESPN+		Murray State	L 62–73	16–11 (10–6)	CEFCU Arena (2,792); Normal, IL
February 26, 2026; 6:30 pm, ESPN+		Southern Illinois	W 78–60	17–11 (11–6)	CEFCU Arena (2,116); Normal, IL
February 28, 2026; 1:00 pm, ESPN+		at Valparaiso	W 83–42	18–11 (12–6)	Athletics–Recreation Center (385); Valparaiso, IN
March 5, 2026; 6:00 pm, ESPN+		at Drake	L 55–73	18–12 (12–7)	Knapp Center (2,171); Des Moines, IA
March 8, 2026; 2:00 pm, ESPN+		at Bradley; I-74 Rivalry	W 66–65	19–12 (13–7)	Renaissance Coliseum (1,155); Peoria, IL
MVC tournament
March 13, 2026; 8:30 pm, ESPN+	(3)	vs. (6) Drake; Quarterfinals	W 69–62	20–12	Xtream Arena (954); Coralville, IA
March 14, 2026; 4:00 pm, ESPN+	(3)	vs. (10) Evansville; Semifinals	L 70–75 ^{OT}	20–13	Xtream Arena (1,382); Coralville, IA
WNIT
March 22, 2026*; 1:00 pm, ESPN+		UT Rio Grande Valley; Second round	W 81–52	21–13	CEFCU Arena (1,062); Normal, IL
March 27, 2026*; 6:30 pm, ESPN+		Abilene Christian; Super 16	W 59–55	22–13	CEFCU Arena (1,416); Normal, IL
March 30, 2026*; 6:30 pm, ESPN+		George Washington; Great 8	W 61–53	23–13	CEFCU Arena (1,706); Normal, IL
April 1, 2026*; 7:00 pm, Midco Sports+/SLN		at South Dakota; Fab 4	W 67–60	24–13	Sanford Coyote Sports Center (3,002); Vermillion, SD
April 4, 2026*; 2:00 pm, ESPN+		at Marshall; Championship	L 41–66	24–14	Cam Henderson Center (5,475); Huntington, WV
*Non-conference game. ^{#}Rankings from AP Poll. (#) Tournament seedings in parentheses. All times are in Central.
