= 2025–26 Iowa Hawkeyes women's basketball team =

American college basketball team

2025–26 Iowa Hawkeyes women's basketball

NCAA tournament, Second Round
- Conference: Big Ten Conference

Ranking
- Coaches: No. 12
- AP: No. 16
- Record: 27–7 (15–3 Big Ten)
- Head coach: Jan Jensen (2nd season)
- Assistant coaches: Abby Stamp; Randi Henderson; LaSondra Barrett; Jasmyn Walker
- Home arena: Carver–Hawkeye Arena

2025–26 Big Ten women's basketball standings
	Conf.				Overall
Team	W		L	PCT	W		L	PCT
No. 1 UCLA †	18	–	0	1.000	37	–	1	.974
No. 7 Michigan	15	–	3	.833	28	–	7	.800
No. 16 Iowa	15	–	3	.833	27	–	7	.794
No. 17 Ohio State	13	–	5	.722	27	–	8	.771
No. 15 Minnesota	13	–	5	.722	24	–	9	.727
No. 20 Maryland	11	–	7	.611	24	–	9	.727
No. 22 Michigan State	11	–	7	.611	23	–	9	.719
No. 25 Washington	10	–	8	.556	22	–	11	.667
USC	9	–	9	.500	18	–	14	.563
Illinois	9	–	9	.500	22	–	12	.647
Oregon	8	–	10	.444	23	–	13	.639
Nebraska	7	–	11	.389	19	–	13	.594
Indiana	6	–	12	.333	18	–	14	.563
Purdue	5	–	13	.278	13	–	17	.433
Wisconsin	5	–	13	.278	16	–	18	.471
Penn State	4	–	14	.222	11	–	18	.379
Northwestern	2	–	16	.111	8	–	21	.276
Rutgers	1	–	17	.056	9	–	20	.310
† 2026 Big Ten tournament winner Rankings from AP poll

The 2025–26 Iowa Hawkeyes women's basketball team represented the University of Iowa during the 2025–26 NCAA Division I women's basketball season. The Hawkeyes, led by second-year head coach Jan Jensen, played their home games at Carver–Hawkeye Arena as a member of the Big Ten Conference.

== Previous season ==
The Hawkeyes finished the 2024–25 season at 23–11, 10–8 in Big Ten play to finish in a four-way tie for eighth place. As the 11th seed in the Big Ten women's tournament, they defeated Wisconsin in the first round and Michigan State in the second round before losing to Ohio State in the quarterfinals. They received an at-large bid to the NCAA tournament as the No. 6 seed in the Spokane 4 region. They defeated Murray State in the first round before losing to Oklahoma in the second round.

== Offseason ==
=== Departures ===
Iowa departures
Name	Number	Pos.	Height	Year	Hometown	Reason for departure
Sydney Affolter	3	G	5'11"	Senior	Chicago, IL	Graduated
Aaliyah Guyton	11	G	5'7"	Freshman	Peoria, IL	Transferred to Illinois
Lucy Olsen	33	G	5'10"	Senior	Collegeville, PA	Graduated/2025 WNBA draft; selected 23rd overall by Washington Mystics
AJ Ediger	34	F	6'2"	Senior	Hudsonville, MI	Graduated
Addison O'Grady	44	F/C	6'4"	Senior	Aurora, CO	Graduated

=== Incoming transfers ===
Iowa incoming transfers
Name	Num	Pos.	Height	Year	Hometown	Previous school
Chazadi Wright	11	G	5'4"	Sophomore	Atlanta, GA	Georgia Tech
Emely Rodriguez	21	G/F	6'0"	Sophomore	La Romana, DR	UCF

=== Recruiting classes ===
==== 2025 recruiting class ====
College recruiting
Name	Hometown	School	Height	Weight	Commit date
Addison Deal; G	Ladera Ranch, CA	Mater Dei High School	6 ft 0 in (1.83 m)	N/A	
Addison Deal; G	Recruit ratings: ESPN: (96)				
Layla Hays; P	Wasilla, AK	Wasilla High School	6 ft 4 in (1.93 m)	N/A	
Layla Hays; P	Recruit ratings: ESPN: (92)				
Journey Houston; G	Davenport, IA	Davenport North High School	5 ft 11 in (1.80 m)	N/A	
Journey Houston; G	Recruit ratings: ESPN: (91)				
Overall recruit ranking:
Note: In many cases, Scout, Rivals, 247Sports, On3, and ESPN may conflict in their listings of height and weight.; In these cases, the average was taken. ESPN grades are on a 100-point scale.; Sources: "2025 Player Commits". ESPN. Archived from the original on August 29, 2025.

== Roster ==
2025–26 Iowa Hawkeyes women's basketball team
Players
Coaches

Pos.	#	Name	Height	Year	Previous school	Hometown
G	1	Taylor Stremlow	5 ft 10 in (1.78 m)	So	Verona Area	Verona, WI
G	2	Taylor McCabe	5 ft 9 in (1.75 m)	Sr	Fremont	Fremont, NE
G	4	Kylie Feuerbach	6 ft 0 in (1.83 m)	GS	Sycamore; Iowa State	Sycamore, IL
C	5	Ava Heiden	6 ft 4 in (1.93 m)	So	Sherwood	Sherwood, OR
G	7	Addie Deal	6 ft 0 in (1.83 m)	Fr	Mater Dei	Irvine, CA
G	8	Journey Houston	5 ft 11 in (1.8 m)	Fr	North	Davenport, IA
G	11	Chazadi Wright	5 ft 4 in (1.63 m)	So	Wesleyan School; Georgia Tech	Atlanta, GA
C	12	Layla Hays	6 ft 5 in (1.96 m)	Fr	Wasilla	Wasilla, AK
G	13	Kennise Johnson	5 ft 4 in (1.63 m)	Jr	Example Academy	Joliet, IL
G/F	21	Emely Rodriguez	6 ft 0 in (1.83 m)	So	Central Pointe Academy; UCF	La Romana, DR
F	23	Jada Gyamfi	6 ft 1 in (1.85 m)	Sr	Johnston	Johnston, IA
G	32	Callie Levin	5 ft 9 in (1.75 m)	So	Solon	Solon, IA
F	45	Hannah Stuelke	6 ft 2 in (1.88 m)	Sr	Washington	Cedar Rapids, IA
G	55	Teagan Mallegni	6 ft 1 in (1.85 m)	So	McFarland	McFarland, WI

Head coach

- Jan Jensen (Drake)

Assistant coach(es)

- Abby Stamp (Iowa)
- Randi Henderson (Iowa)
- LaSondra Barrett (LSU)
- Jasmyn Walker (Western Michigan)

Legend

- (C) Team captain
- (S) Suspended
- (I) Ineligible
- (W) Walk-on
- Injured
- Current redshirt

Roster

== Schedule and results ==
Date time, TV	Rank^{#}	Opponent^{#}	Result	Record	High points	High rebounds	High assists	Site (attendance) city, state
Exhibition
October 30, 2025*; 6:30 p.m., B1G+	No. 21	Ashland	W 104–63		23 – Stuelke	12 – Heiden	5 – Deal	Carver–Hawkeye Arena (14,998); Iowa City, IA
Regular season
November 3, 2025*; 6:30 p.m., B1G+	No. 21	Southern	W 86–51	1–0	21 – Heiden	14 – Heiden	7 – Wright	Carver–Hawkeye Arena (14,998); Iowa City, IA
November 9, 2025*; 2:00 p.m., B1G+	No. 21	Evansville	W 119–43	2–0	20 – Hays	10 – Heiden	10 – Wright	Carver–Hawkeye Arena (14,998); Iowa City, IA
November 13, 2025*; 7:30 p.m., BTN	No. 21	Drake	W 100–58	3–0	14 – Tied	10 – Hays	5 – Tied	Carver–Hawkeye Arena (14,998); Iowa City, IA
November 16, 2025*; 2:00 p.m., ESPN+	No. 21	at Northern Iowa	W 74–41	4–0	19 – Wright	7 – Tied	4 – Deal	McLeod Center (7,146); Cedar Falls, IA
November 20, 2025*; 8:00 p.m., ESPN2	No. 19	vs. No. 7 Baylor; WBCA Showcase	W 57–52	5–0	18 – Heiden	11 – Heiden	4 – Stremlow	State Farm Field House (2,532); Bay Lake, FL
November 22, 2025*; 7:00 p.m., ESPN+	No. 19	vs. Miami (FL); WBCA Showcase	W 64–61	6–0	20 – Heiden	12 – Stuelke	5 – Tied	State Farm Field House (2,774); Bay Lake, FL
November 26, 2025*; 6:30 p.m., B1G+	No. 11	Western Illinois	W 86–69	7–0	17 – Deal	10 – Heiden	5 – Tied	Carver–Hawkeye Arena (14,998); Iowa City, IA
November 30, 2025*; 12:00 p.m., BTN	No. 11	Fairfield	W 86–72	8–0	18 – Heiden	16 – Heiden	7 – Stremlow	Carver–Hawkeye Arena (14,998); Iowa City, IA
December 6, 2025; 5:00 p.m., FS1	No. 12	at Rutgers	W 79–36	9–0 (1–0)	17 – Heiden	8 – Tied	7 – Feuerbach	Jersey Mike's Arena (3,457); Piscataway, NJ
December 10, 2025*; 6:00 p.m., ESPN	No. 11	at No. 10 Iowa State; Rivalry/Iowa Corn Cy-Hawk Series/Jimmy V Classic	L 69–74	9–1	21 – Wright	15 – Stuelke	3 – Tied	Hilton Coliseum (14,009); Ames, IA
December 13, 2025*; 2:00 p.m., B1G+	No. 11	Lindenwood	W 102–68	10–1	31 – Stuelke	6 – Tied	7 – Stremlow	Carver–Hawkeye Arena (14,998); Iowa City, IA
December 20, 2025*; 12:00 p.m., FOX	No. 11	vs. No. 1 UConn; Shark Beauty Women's Champions Classic	L 64–90	10–2	17 – Stuelke	6 – Heiden	5 – Stuelke	Barclays Center (10,107); Brooklyn, NY
December 28, 2025; 3:00 p.m., BTN	No. 14	Penn State	W 99–76	11–2 (2–0)	27 – Heiden	11 – Houston	6 – Wright	Carver–Hawkeye Arena (14,998); Iowa, City, IA
January 1, 2026; 1:00 p.m., BTN	No. 14	No. 20 Nebraska	W 86–76	12–2 (3–0)	24 – Wright	10 – Stuelke	8 – Stremlow	Carver–Hawkeye Arena (14,988); Iowa, City, IA
January 5, 2026; 7:30 p.m., BTN	No. 14	at Northwestern	W 67–58	13–2 (4–0)	23 – Heiden	6 – Houston	7 – Wright	Welsh–Ryan Arena (2,272); Evanston, IL
January 11, 2026; 4:00 p.m., BTN	No. 14	at Indiana	W 56–53	14–2 (5–0)	13 – Tied	12 – Stuelke	3 – Wright	Simon Skjodt Assembly Hall (8,073); Bloomington, IN
January 15, 2026; 8:00 p.m., FS1	No. 11	Oregon	W 74–66	15–2 (6–0)	18 – Tied	9 – Heiden	8 – Stuelke	Carver–Hawkeye Arena (14,988); Iowa, City, IA
January 18, 2026; 7:00 p.m., BTN	No. 11	No. 15 Michigan State	W 75–68	16–2 (7–0)	22 – Stuelke	9 – Stuelke	5 – Tied	Carver–Hawkeye Arena (14,988); Iowa, City, IA
January 22, 2026; 5:00 p.m., Peacock	No. 10	at No. 15 Maryland	W 85–78 ^{OT}	17–2 (8–0)	20 – Heiden	11 – Stuelke	5 – Tied	Xfinity Center (6,514); College Park, MD
January 25, 2026; 1:00 p.m., Peacock	No. 10	No. 12 Ohio State	W 91–70	18–2 (9–0)	20 – Deal	15 – Stuelke	9 – Feuerbach	Carver–Hawkeye Arena (14,998); Iowa, City, IA
January 29, 2026; 8:00 p.m., Peacock	No. 8	at USC	L 69–81	18–3 (9–1)	16 – Houston	8 – Tied	8 – Wright	Galen Center (4,303); Los Angeles, CA
February 1, 2026; 3:00 p.m., FOX	No. 8	at No. 2 UCLA	L 65–88	18–4 (9–2)	19 – Heiden	8 – Stuelke	7 – Wright	Pauley Pavilion (6,917); Los Angeles, CA
February 5, 2026; 6:00 p.m., BTN	No. 10	Minnesota	L 85–91	18–5 (9–3)	24 – Heiden	9 – Stuelke	12 – Wright	Carver–Hawkeye Arena (14,998); Iowa, City, IA
February 11, 2026; 6:30 p.m., B1G+	No. 15	No. 25 Washington	W 65–56	19–5 (10–3)	21 – Wright	16 – Stuelke	4 – Wright	Carver–Hawkeye Arena (14,998); Iowa, City, IA
February 16, 2026; 11:00 a.m., FOX	No. 13	at Nebraska	W 80–67	20–5 (11–3)	27 – Heiden	11 – Heiden	7 – Wright	Pinnacle Bank Arena (6,771); Lincoln, NE
February 19, 2026; 6:00 p.m., B1G+	No. 13	at Purdue	W 83–74	21–5 (12–3)	21 – Heiden	13 – Heiden	8 – Stremlow	Mackey Arena (4,046); West Lafayette, IN
February 22, 2026; 11:00 a.m., FOX	No. 13	No. 6 Michigan	W 62–44	22–5 (13–3)	24 – Heiden	12 – Stuelke	7 – Stuelke	Carver–Hawkeye Arena (14,998); Iowa, City, IA
February 26, 2026; 8:00 p.m., BTN	No. 9	Illinois	W 82–78	23–5 (14–3)	28 – Heiden	8 – Houston	11 – Stremlow	Carver–Hawkeye Arena (14,998); Iowa, City, IA
March 1, 2026; 2:00 p.m., B1G+	No. 9	at Wisconsin	W 81–52	24–5 (15–3)	16 – Heiden	14 – Heiden	9 – Stremlow	Kohl Center (8,520); Madison, WI
Big Ten tournament
March 6, 2026; 5:30 p.m., BTN	(2) No. 9	vs. (10) Illinois; Quarterfinals	W 64–58	25–5	16 – Heiden	12 – Houston	6 – Stremlow	Gainbridge Fieldhouse; Indianapolis, IN
March 7, 2026; 3:30 p.m., BTN	(2) No. 9	vs. (3) No. 8 Michigan; Semifinals	W 59–42	26–5	16 – Heiden	10 – Stuelke	6 – Stremlow	Gainbridge Fieldhouse (6,387); Indianapolis, IN
March 8, 2026; 1:15 p.m., CBS	(2) No. 9	vs. (1) No. 2 UCLA; Championship	L 45–96	26–6	15 – Heiden	4 – Tied	5 – Wright	Gainbridge Fieldhouse (6,451); Indianapolis, IN
NCAA tournament
March 21, 2026*; 3:00 p.m., ESPN	(2 S4) No. 7	(15 S4) Fairleigh Dickinson; First Round	W 58–48	27–6	29 – Heiden	11 – Feuerbach	7 – Stremlow	Carver–Hawkeye Arena (14,332); Iowa, City, IA
March 23, 2026*; 1:00 p.m., ESPN	(2 S4) No. 7	(10 S4) Virginia; Second Round	L 75–83 ^{2OT}	27–7	26 – Heiden	19 – Stuelke	4 – Stremlow	Carver–Hawkeye Arena (14,332); Iowa, City, IA
*Non-conference game. ^{#}Rankings from AP Poll. (#) Tournament seedings in parentheses. Sacramento 4=S4. All times are in Central Time. Source:

== Rankings ==
Ranking movements Legend: ██ Increase in ranking ██ Decrease in ranking
	Week																				
Poll	Pre	1	2	3	4	5	6	7	8	9	10	11	12	13	14	15	16	17	18	19	Final
AP	21	21	19	11	12	11	11	14	14*	14	11	10	8	10	15	13	9	9	7	7	16
Coaches	23	23	20	14	12	12	12	14	14	14	13	10	8	10	12	12	9	9	7	7	12

*AP did not release a week 8 poll.
