= 2025–26 Michigan Wolverines women's basketball team =

Intercollegiate basketball season

2025–26 Michigan Wolverines women's basketball

NCAA tournament, Elite Eight
- Conference: Big Ten Conference

Ranking
- Coaches: No. 6
- AP: No. 7
- Record: 28–7 (15–3 Big Ten)
- Head coach: Kim Barnes Arico (14th season)
- Assistant coaches: Melanie Moore; Justine Raterman; Natalie Achonwa; Jordann Reese; Danielle Rauch
- Home arena: Crisler Center

2025–26 Big Ten women's basketball standings
	Conf.				Overall
Team	W		L	PCT	W		L	PCT
No. 1 UCLA †	18	–	0	1.000	37	–	1	.974
No. 7 Michigan	15	–	3	.833	28	–	7	.800
No. 16 Iowa	15	–	3	.833	27	–	7	.794
No. 17 Ohio State	13	–	5	.722	27	–	8	.771
No. 15 Minnesota	13	–	5	.722	24	–	9	.727
No. 20 Maryland	11	–	7	.611	24	–	9	.727
No. 22 Michigan State	11	–	7	.611	23	–	9	.719
No. 25 Washington	10	–	8	.556	22	–	11	.667
USC	9	–	9	.500	18	–	14	.563
Illinois	9	–	9	.500	22	–	12	.647
Oregon	8	–	10	.444	23	–	13	.639
Nebraska	7	–	11	.389	19	–	13	.594
Indiana	6	–	12	.333	18	–	14	.563
Purdue	5	–	13	.278	13	–	17	.433
Wisconsin	5	–	13	.278	16	–	18	.471
Penn State	4	–	14	.222	11	–	18	.379
Northwestern	2	–	16	.111	8	–	21	.276
Rutgers	1	–	17	.056	9	–	20	.310
† 2026 Big Ten tournament winner Rankings from AP poll

The 2025–26 Michigan Wolverines women's basketball team represented the University of Michigan during the 2025–26 NCAA Division I women's basketball season. The Wolverines were led by head coach Kim Barnes Arico in her fourteenth year, and played their home games at the Crisler Center in Ann Arbor, Michigan.

Michigan finished the regular season 24–5, and 15–3 in the conference, setting program records for regular season and conference wins. In the 2026 NCAA tournament, Michigan advanced to the Elite Eight for the second time in program history, and won their 28th game, tying the single-season program record. The team also set program records in total points, 2,880, and scoring average, 82.3 points per game.

== Previous season ==
The Wolverines finished the 2024–25 season with a 23–11 record, including 11–7 in Big Ten play to finish tied for fifth place. They were ranked the No. 6 seed in the 2025 NCAA Tournament, and were eliminated in the second round by Notre Dame. The Wolverines finished the year ranked No. 25 in the season-ending AP Poll.

== Offseason ==
On April 8, 2025, Yulia Grabovskaia transferred to Washington. Michigan added two players via the transfer portal, Kendall Dudley from UCLA and Ashley Sofilkanich from Bucknell.

=== Departures ===
Michigan Departures
Name	Number	Pos.	Weight	Year	Hometown	Reason for departure
Yulia Grabovskaia	55	C	6'5"	Junior	Rostov-on-Don, Russia	Transferred to Washington
Jordan Hobbs	10	G	6'3"	Senior	Springboro, OH	Graduated
Greta Kampschroeder	11	G	6'1"	Senior	Naperville, IL	Graduated

=== Incoming transfers ===
Michigan incoming transfers
Name	Pos.	Height	Year	Hometown	Previous team
Kendall Dudley	F	6'2"	SO	Manassas Park, VA	UCLA
Ashley Sofilkanich	F	6'3"	JR	South Amboy, NJ	Bucknell

=== Recruiting class ===
College recruiting
Name	Hometown	School	Height	Weight	Commit date
McKenzie Mathurin; G	Broken Arrow, Oklahoma	Broken Arrow High School	5 ft 10 in (1.78 m)	N/A	Aug 7, 2024
McKenzie Mathurin; G	Recruit ratings: ESPN: (94)				
Ciara Byars; F	Paris, KY	George Rogers Clark High School	6 ft 2 in (1.88 m)	N/A	Oct 23, 2024
Ciara Byars; F	Recruit ratings: ESPN: (93)				
Jessica Fields; G	Kennesaw, GA	Mount Paran Christian School	6 ft 1 in (1.85 m)	N/A	Aug 11, 2024
Jessica Fields; G	Recruit ratings: ESPN: (91)				
Overall recruit ranking:
Note: In many cases, Scout, Rivals, 247Sports, On3, and ESPN may conflict in their listings of height and weight.; In these cases, the average was taken. ESPN grades are on a 100-point scale.; Sources: "2025 Michigan Wolverines Recruiting Class". ESPN. Archived from the original on April 16, 2025.

== Roster ==
2025–26 Michigan Wolverines women's basketball team
Players
Coaches

Pos.	#	Name	Height	Year	Previous school	Hometown
G	1	Olivia Olson	6 ft 1 in (1.85 m)	So	Benilde-St. Margaret's	New Hope, MN
G	2	Macy Brown	6 ft 0 in (1.83 m)	Jr	East Grand Rapids HS	East Grand Rapids, MI
G	3	Mila Holloway	5 ft 10 in (1.78 m)	So	Legacy Early College	Charlotte, NC
G	5	Brooke Quarles Daniels	5 ft 7 in (1.7 m)	Sr	Oakland	Macomb, MI
F	7	Jessica Fields	6 ft 1 in (1.85 m)	Fr	Mount Paran Christian School	Kennesaw, GA
G	12	Syla Swords	6 ft 0 in (1.83 m)	So	Long Island Lutheran HS	Sudbury, ON
F	15	Ashley Sofilkanich	6 ft 3 in (1.91 m)	Jr	Bucknell	South Amboy, NJ
F	20	Alyssa Crockett	6 ft 2 in (1.88 m)	Sr	Westfield HS	Westfield, IN
F	21	Ally VanTimmeren	6 ft 2 in (1.88 m)	RS Sr	Jenison HS	Allendale, MI
F	22	Kendall Dudley	6 ft 2 in (1.88 m)	So	UCLA	Manassas Park, VA
F	23	Ciara Byars	6 ft 2 in (1.88 m)	Fr	George Rogers Clark HS	Paris, KY
G	25	McKenzie Mathurin	5 ft 10 in (1.78 m)	Fr	Broken Arrow HS	Broken Arrow, OK
G/F	33	Te'Yala Delfosse	6 ft 3 in (1.91 m)	So	Ewing HS	Ewing, NJ
F	34	Aaiyanna Dunbar	6 ft 2 in (1.88 m)	So	Blackman HS	Murfreesboro, TN

Head coach

- Kim Barnes Arico (alum: Montclair State)

Assistant coach(es)

- Melanie Moore (Siena)
- Justine Raterman (Dayton)
- Natalie Achonwa (Notre Dame)
- Jordann Reese (Drake)
- Danielle Rauch (Michigan)

Legend

- (C) Team captain
- (S) Suspended
- (I) Ineligible
- (W) Walk-on
- Injured
- Current redshirt

Roster

== Schedule and results ==
Date time, TV	Rank^{#}	Opponent^{#}	Result	Record	High points	High rebounds	High assists	Site (attendance) city, state
Exhibition
October 30, 2025*; 7:00 p.m., B1G+	No. 13	Ferris State	W 108–58	–	22 – Olson	10 – Olson	7 – Holloway	Crisler Center (1,441); Ann Arbor, MI
Regular season
November 4, 2025*; 7:00 p.m., B1G+	No. 13	Canisius	W 100–40	1–0	21 – Holloway	6 – Delfosse	8 – Holloway	Crisler Center (2,881); Ann Arbor, MI
November 9, 2025*; 12:00 p.m., B1G+	No. 13	Harvard	W 84–55	2–0	18 – Olson	6 – Delfosse	5 – Quarles Daniels	Crisler Center (3,348); Ann Arbor, MI
November 15, 2025*; 4:00 p.m., NBC	No. 14	vs. No. 18 Notre Dame; Citi Shamrock Classic	W 93–54	3–0	20 – Olson	10 – Quarles Daniels	5 – Holloway	Wayne State Fieldhouse (2,200); Detroit, MI
November 18, 2025*; 7:00 p.m., B1G+	No. 6	Binghamton	W 120–50	4–0	15 – Tied	6 – Tied	8 – Holloway	Crisler Center (2,557); Ann Arbor, MI
November 21, 2025*; 8:00 p.m., FOX	No. 6	vs. No. 1 UConn; Basketball Hall of Fame Women's Showcase	L 69–72	4–1	29 – Swords	10 – Olson	6 – Holloway	Mohegan Sun Arena (6,312); Uncasville, CT
November 23, 2025*; 12:00 p.m., FS1	No. 6	vs. Syracuse; Basketball Hall of Fame Women's Showcase	W 81–55	5–1	21 – Delfosse	8 – Olson	7 – Quarles Daniels	Mohegan Sun Arena; Uncasville, CT
November 26, 2025*; 5:00 p.m., ESPN+	No. 6	at Detroit Mercy	W 102–53	6–1	19 – Holloway	10 – Delfosse	5 – Quarles Daniels	Calihan Hall (867); Detroit, MI
December 3, 2025*; 7:00 p.m., B1G+	No. 6	Central Michigan	W 82–40	7–1	21 – Olson	11 – Olson	4 – Holloway	Crisler Center (2,773); Ann Arbor, MI
December 7, 2025; 12:00 p.m., BTN	No. 6	Purdue	W 104–56	8–1 (1–0)	26 – Olson	7 – Olson	5 – Olson	Crisler Center (4,055); Ann Arbor, MI
December 13, 2025*; 12:00 p.m., B1G+	No. 6	Akron	W 85–59	9–1	17 – Tied	7 – Delfosse	7 – Holloway	Crisler Center (3,495); Ann Arbor, MI
December 21, 2025*; 12:00 p.m., B1G+	No. 6	Oakland	W 97–54	10–1	23 – Olson	6 – Tied	7 – Holloway	Crisler Center (4,752); Ann Arbor, MI
December 29, 2025; 9:00 p.m., FS1	No. 6	at Oregon	W 92–87 ^{2OT}	11–1 (2–0)	18 – Swords	9 – Delfosse	6 – Holloway	Matthew Knight Arena (5,439); Eugene, OR
January 1, 2026; 6:00 p.m., BTN	No. 6	at Washington	L 52–64	11–2 (2–1)	15 – Swords	6 – Swords	1 – Tied	Alaska Airlines Arena (5,229); Seattle, WA
January 5, 2026; 6:30 p.m., BTN	No. 9	Minnesota	W 70–60	12–2 (3–1)	21 – Olson	7 – Tied	4 – Quarles Daniels	Crisler Center (3,046); Ann Arbor, MI
January 8, 2026; 6:00 p.m., B1G+	No. 9	at Penn State	W 105–65	13–2 (4–1)	18 – Holloway	12 – Quarles Daniels	6 – Olson	Rec Hall (1,468); State College, PA
January 11, 2026; 2:00 p.m., B1G+	No. 9	Wisconsin	W 86–60	14–2 (5–1)	21 – Olson	10 – Delfosse	6 – Quarles Daniels	Crisler Center (4,488); Ann Arbor, MI
January 15, 2026; 7:00 p.m., Peacock	No. 8	No. 25 Illinois	W 85–69	15–2 (6–1)	21 – Olson	9 – Tied	5 – Swords	Crisler Center (3,108); Ann Arbor, MI
January 19, 2026*; 2:30 p.m., FOX	No. 7	vs. No. 5 Vanderbilt; Coretta Scott King Classic	L 69–72	15–3	16 – Tied	10 – Quarles Daniels	4 – Tied	Prudential Center (6,742); Newark, NJ
January 22, 2026; 6:00 p.m., BTN	No. 7	at Rutgers	W 94–60	16–3 (7–1)	16 – Tied	8 – Dudley	5 – Tied	Jersey Mike's Arena (2,802); Piscataway, NJ
January 25, 2026; 2:00 p.m., BTN	No. 7	USC	W 73–67	17–3 (8–1)	24 – Olson	8 – Olson	8 – Holloway	Crisler Center (4,692); Ann Arbor, MI
January 29, 2026; 7:00 p.m., Peacock	No. 9	at Indiana	W 95–67	18–3 (9–1)	27 – Olson	6 – Quarles Daniels	5 – Holloway	Simon Skjodt Assembly Hall (7,619); Bloomington, IN
February 1, 2026; 12:00 p.m., FS1	No. 9	at No. 13 Michigan State; Rivalry	W 94–91 ^{OT}	19–3 (10–1)	26 – Holloway	8 – Sofilkanich	6 – Quarles Daniels	Breslin Center (11,635); East Lansing, MI
February 4, 2026; 7:00 p.m., B1G+	No. 8	Nebraska	W 88–76	20–3 (11–1)	28 – Swords	13 – Sofilkanich	6 – Olson	Crisler Center (3,039); Ann Arbor, MI
February 8, 2026; 3:00 p.m., FOX	No. 8	No. 2 UCLA	L 66–69	20–4 (11–2)	20 – Olson	8 – Tied	6 – Holloway	Crisler Center (6,108); Ann Arbor, MI
February 12, 2026; 9:00 p.m., Peacock	No. 7	at Northwestern	W 80–58	21–4 (12–2)	21 – Olson	8 – Olson	7 – Olson	Welsh–Ryan Arena (1,636); Evanston, IL
February 15, 2026; 4:00 p.m., FS1	No. 7	No. 13 Michigan State; Rivalry	W 86–65	22–4 (13–2)	24 – Swords	8 – Olson	5 – Quarles Daniels	Crisler Center (11,627); Ann Arbor, MI
February 22, 2026; 12:00 p.m., FOX	No. 6	at No. 13 Iowa	L 44–62	22–5 (13–3)	13 – Olson	8 – Holloway	4 – Holloway	Carver–Hawkeye Arena (14,998); Iowa, City, IA
February 25, 2026; 8:00 p.m., Peacock	No. 8	at No. 13 Ohio State; Rivalry	W 88–86 ^{OT}	23–5 (14–3)	31 – Olson	9 – Olson	4 – Tied	Value City Arena (6,663); Columbus, OH
February 28, 2026; 2:30 p.m., FOX	No. 8	No. 14 Maryland	W 87–69	24–5 (15–3)	28 – Olson	8 – Olson	6 – Holloway	Crisler Center (5,212); Ann Arbor, MI
Big Ten tournament
March 6, 2026; 9:00 p.m., BTN	(3) No. 8	vs. (11) Oregon; Quarterfinal	W 80–58	25–5	17 – Swords	8 – Swords	10 – Holloway	Gainbridge Fieldhouse (6,053); Indianapolis, IN
March 7, 2026; 4:30 p.m., BTN	(3) No. 8	vs. (2) No. 9 Iowa; Semifinal	L 42–59	25–6	10 – Tied	6 – Tied	2 – Tied	Gainbridge Fieldhouse (6,387); Indianapolis, IN
NCAA tournament
March 20, 2026*; 5:30 p.m., ESPN2	(2 FW3) No. 9	(15 FW3) Holy Cross; First round	W 83–48	26–6	20 – Holloway	8 – Tied	7 – Holloway	Crisler Center (8,491); Ann Arbor, MI
March 22, 2026*; 1:00 p.m., ABC	(2 FW3) No. 9	(7 FW3) NC State; Second round	W 92–63	27–6	27 – Olson	9 – Holloway	6 – Holloway	Crisler Center (7,003); Ann Arbor, MI
March 28, 2026*; 12:30 p.m., ABC	(2 FW3) No. 9	vs. (3 FW3) No. 13 Louisville; Sweet Sixteen	W 71–52	28–6	19 – Olson	9 – Quarles Daniels	7 – Holloway	Dickies Arena (11,197); Fort Worth, TX
March 30, 2026*; 7:00 p.m., ESPN	(2 FW3) No. 9	vs. (1 FW3) No. 3 Texas; Elite Eight	L 41–77	28–7	11 – Tied	6 – Quarles Daniels	2 – Holloway	Dickies Arena (9,354); Fort Worth, TX
*Non-conference game. ^{#}Rankings from AP poll. (#) Tournament seedings in parentheses. FW3=Fort Worth 3. All times are in Eastern Time. Source:

== Awards and honors ==
Weekly Awards
Player	Award	Date Awarded	Ref.
Olivia Olson	Big Ten Player of the Week	February 16, 2026	
Olivia Olson	Big Ten Player of the Week	March 2, 2026	

Player	Award	Ref
Olivia Olson	Second-team All-American (ESPN, NYT)	
Olivia Olson	Third-team All-American (AP, TSN, USBWA)	
Olivia Olson	First-team All-Big Ten	
Syla Swords	First-team All-Big Ten	
Brooke Quarles Daniels	Big Ten All-Defensive Team	
Mila Holloway	All-Big Ten Honorable Mention	
Olivia Olson	NCAA Tournament Fort Worth 3 All-Region Team	
Syla Swords	NCAA Tournament Fort Worth 3 All-Region Team	

== Rankings ==
Ranking movements Legend: ██ Increase in ranking ██ Decrease in ranking т = Tied with team above or below
	Week																				
Poll	Pre	1	2	3	4	5	6	7	8	9	10	11	12	13	14	15	16	17	18	19	Final
AP	13	14	6	6	6	6	6	6	6*	9	8	7	9	8	7	6	8	8	9	9	7
Coaches	15	15	9	9	8	8	9	8т	8	9	7	7т	9	7	7	5	8	7	8	8	6

*AP did not release a week 8 poll.
