= DeAntoine Beasley =

American basketball player and coach

DeAntoine Beasley (born January 8, 1979, in Atlanta, Georgia) is a retired American professional basketball player and current assistant coach for the University of Illinois women's basketball team. The 6 ft 7 small forward played at Tennessee Tech. He played professionally from 2002 to 2009, primarily for the Plymouth Raiders in the British Basketball League. He coached men's college basketball from 2009 to 2018 before joining the coaching staff for the Dayton Flyers women's basketball team at the University of Dayton, then for UIUC starting in 2022.

== Coaching career ==
After a year as a graduate assistant at Auburn, Beasley was hired in 2010 as an assistant coach at Tennessee Tech. Further men's coaching jobs followed at Chattanooga and Gardner-Webb. He has coached women's basketball since 2018, first with the Dayton Flyers, and then at the University of Illinois starting in 2022.
