= 2025–26 Belmont Bruins women's basketball team =

American college basketball season

2025–26 Belmont Bruins women's basketball
- Conference: Missouri Valley Conference
- Record: 20–12 (16–4 MVC)
- Head coach: Bart Brooks (9th season)
- Associate head coach: Jamey Givens
- Assistant coaches: Amy Malo; Jessica Holman; Jo Cambridge
- Home arena: Curb Event Center

2025–26 Missouri Valley Conference women's basketball standings
	Conf.				Overall
Team	W		L	PCT	W		L	PCT
Murray State †	19	–	1	.950	31	–	4	.886
Belmont	16	–	4	.800	20	–	12	.625
Illinois State	13	–	7	.650	24	–	14	.632
Northern Iowa	13	–	7	.650	18	–	14	.563
Bradley	13	–	7	.650	20	–	13	.606
Drake	10	–	10	.500	12	–	20	.375
UIC	9	–	11	.450	14	–	18	.438
Southern Illinois	7	–	13	.350	10	–	20	.333
Indiana State	5	–	15	.250	10	–	22	.313
Evansville	5	–	15	.250	10	–	25	.286
Valparaiso	0	–	20	.000	0	–	32	.000
† 2026 MVC tournament winner

The 2025–26 Belmont Bruins women's basketball team represented Belmont University during the 2025–26 NCAA Division I women's basketball season. The Bruins, led by ninth-year head coach Bart Brooks, played their home games at the Curb Event Center in Nashville, Tennessee as members of the Missouri Valley Conference.

== Previous season ==
The Bruins finished the 2024–25 season 26–13, 15–5 in MVC play, to finish in a tie for third place. They defeated Northern Iowa, and Missouri State, before falling to top-seeded Murray State in the MVC tournament championship game. They received an at-large bid to the WBIT, where they would defeat Middle Tennessee in the first round, Northern Arizona in the second round, James Madison in the quarterfinals, and Villanova in the semifinals, before falling to Minnesota in the championship game.

== Preseason ==
On October 22, 2025, the Missouri Valley Conference released their preseason poll. Belmont was picked to finish atop the conference, receiving 25 out of a 44 possible first-place votes. Only the top 4 vote getters were released.

=== Preseason rankings ===
MVC Preseason Poll
Place	Team	Votes
1	Belmont	446 (25)
2	Murray State	436 (13)
3	Illinois State	387 (2)
4	Drake	371 (4)
(#) first-place votes

=== MVC "Players to Watch" ===
MVC "Players to Watch"
Player	Year	Position
Jailyn Banks	Junior	Guard
Tuti Jones	Graduate Student	Guard
Emily La Chapell	Senior	Guard
Avery Strickland	Graduate Student	Guard

== Roster ==
2025–26 Belmont Bruins women's basketball team
Players
Coaches

Pos.	#	Name	Height	Year	Previous school	Hometown
G	0	Tuti Jones	5 ft 7 in (1.7 m)	GS	Charles Henderson High School	Troy, Alabama
G	1	Kensley Feltner	5 ft 11 in (1.8 m)	Jr	Lawrence County High School	Louisa, Kentucky
F	3	Dacarra Ward	6 ft 2 in (1.88 m)	Fr	Bartlett High School	Memphis, Tennessee
G	5	Sanaa Tripp	5 ft 8 in (1.73 m)	So	Newton High School	Covington, Georgia
G	7	Claire Hyde	5 ft 6 in (1.68 m)	RS Jr	Morton College	Wheaton, Illinois
F	9	Hilary Fuller	6 ft 2 in (1.88 m)	So	All Hallows' School	Brisbane, Australia
G	12	Kate McGinnis	5 ft 9 in (1.75 m)	Fr	Kimberly High School	Kimberly, Wisconsin
G	13	Avery Strickland	5 ft 10 in (1.78 m)	GS	Tennessee	Knoxville, Tennessee
G	15	Rylie Beers	6 ft 0 in (1.83 m)	Fr	Valor Christian High School	Littleton, Colorado
G	20	Tatum Woodson	5 ft 10 in (1.78 m)	Fr	Hopkins High School	Minnetonka, Minnesota
G	21	Emily La Chapell	5 ft 11 in (1.8 m)	Sr	Marquette	Appleton, Wisconsin
G	22	Quinn Eubank	6 ft 0 in (1.83 m)	So	Ryle High School	Union, Kentucky
G	23	Jailyn Banks	5 ft 9 in (1.75 m)	Jr	Middle Tennessee Christian School	Spring Hill, Tennessee
C	33	KK Brodie	6 ft 3 in (1.91 m)	Jr	Pepperdine	Columbia, Missouri
F	55	Leah West	6 ft 1 in (1.85 m)	Fr	Greensburg Community High School	Greensburg, Indiana

Head coach

- Bart Brooks (Wyoming)

Assistant coach(es)

- Jamey Givens (Florida State)
- Amy Malo (Vanderbilt)
- Jessica Holman (Vanderbilt)
- Jo Cambridge (Vanderbilt)

Legend

- (C) Team captain
- (S) Suspended
- (I) Ineligible
- (W) Walk-on
- Injured
- Current redshirt

Roster
Last update: September 13, 2026

== Schedule and results ==
Date time, TV	Rank^{#}	Opponent^{#}	Result	Record	Site (attendance) city, state
Regular season
November 3, 2025*; 4:30 pm, SECN+		at No. 6 Oklahoma	L 67–84	0–1	Lloyd Noble Center (6,476); Norman, OK
November 7, 2025*; 6:30 pm, ESPN+		Brown	W 83–61	1–1	Curb Event Center (1,020); Nashville, TN
November 13, 2025*; 6:00 pm, SECN		at No. 12 Tennessee	L 58–68	1–2	Thompson–Boling Arena (10,043); Knoxville, TN
November 16, 2025*; 12:00 pm, ESPN+		at Dayton	W 72–66	2–2	UD Arena (2,171); Dayton, OH
November 19, 2025*; 5:00 pm, ESPN+		Lipscomb; Battle of the Boulevard	W 80−60	3−2	Curb Event Center (4,132); Nashville, TN
November 24, 2025*; 10:00 am, FloCollege		vs. Ohio State; Pink Flamingo Championship Goombay Division Semifinal	L 56−68	3−3	Baha Mar Convention Center (237); Nassau, Bahamas
November 26, 2025*; 10:00 am, FloCollege		vs. McNeese; Pink Flamingo Championship Goombay Division consolation	L 66–76	3–4	Baha Mar Convention Center (217); Nassau, Bahamas
December 3, 2025*; 6:30 pm, ESPN+		at Middle Tennessee	W 71–65	4–4	Murphy Center (3,378); Murfreesboro, TN
December 6, 2025*; 1:00 pm, ESPN+		Princeton	L 58–70	4–5	Curb Event Center (755); Nashville, TN
December 14, 2025*; 2:00 pm, ESPN+		No. 15 Kentucky	L 69–77	4–6	Curb Event Center (1,115); Nashville, TN
December 17, 2025; 6:30 pm, ESPN+		Evansville	W 77–67	5–6 (1–0)	Curb Event Center (709); Nashville, TN
December 20, 2025*; 2:00 pm, ESPN+		Duke	L 46−76	5−7	Curb Event Center (1,154); Nashville, TN
December 29, 2025; 6:00 pm, ESPN+		at Southern Illinois	W 68–56	6–7 (2–0)	Banterra Center (238); Carbondale, IL
January 2, 2026; 2:00 pm, ESPN+		Bradley	W 78–57	7–7 (3–0)	Curb Event Center (883); Nashville, TN
January 4, 2026; 1:00 pm, ESPN+		Illinois State	W 75–68	8–7 (4–0)	Curb Event Center (1,333); Nashville, TN
January 9, 2026; 6:30 pm, ESPN+		Drake	W 78–69	9–7 (5–0)	Curb Event Center (818); Nashville, TN
January 11, 2026; 2:00 pm, ESPN+		Northern Iowa	W 81–62	10–7 (6–0)	Curb Event Center (751); Nashville, TN
January 15, 2026; 6:00 pm, ESPN+		at Indiana State	W 85–77	11–7 (7–0)	Hulman Center (973); Terre Haute, IN
January 18, 2026; 2:00 pm, ESPN+		at Murray State	L 48–69	11–8 (7–1)	CFSB Center (2,101); Murray, KY
January 24, 2026; 4:00 pm, ESPN+		Southern Illinois	Postponed due to weather		Curb Event Center; Nashville, TN
January 29, 2026; 6:00 pm, ESPN+		at Evansville	W 79–73 ^{OT}	12–8 (8–1)	Meeks Family Fieldhouse (448); Evansville, IN
January 31, 2026; 4:00 pm, ESPN+		Murray State	L 71–78	12–9 (8–2)	Curb Event Center (1,427); Nashville, TN
February 5, 2026; 6:00 pm, ESPN+		at Drake	W 67–52	13–9 (9–2)	Knapp Center (2,040); Des Moines, IA
February 7, 2025; 2:00 pm, ESPN+		at Northern Iowa	W 70–58	14–9 (10–2)	McLeod Center (2,540); Cedar Falls, IA
February 13, 2026; 6:30 pm, ESPN+		UIC	W 71–56	15–9 (11–2)	Curb Event Center (1,231); Nashville, TN
February 15, 2026; 2:00 pm, ESPN+		Valparaiso	W 77–37	16–9 (12–2)	Curb Event Center (824); Nashville, TN
February 20, 2026; 6:30 pm, ESPN+		at Illinois State	L 78–83 ^{OT}	16–10 (12–3)	CEFCU Arena (2,369); Normal, IL
February 22, 2026; 2:00 pm, ESPN+		at Bradley	L 47–51	16–11 (12–4)	Renaissance Coliseum (897); Peoria, IL
February 28, 2026; 4:00 pm, ESPN+		Indiana State	W 88–79	17–11 (13–4)	Curb Event Center (1,037); Nashville, TN
March 2, 2026; 6:30 pm, ESPN+		Southern Illinois; Rescheduled from January 24	W 83–64	18–11 (14–4)	Curb Event Center (840); Nashville, TN
March 5, 2026; 6:00 pm, ESPN+		at Valparaiso	W 83–63	19–11 (15–4)	Athletics–Recreation Center (210); Valparaiso, IN
March 7, 2026; 2:00 pm, ESPN+		at UIC	W 78–70 ^{OT}	20–11 (16–4)	Credit Union 1 Arena (819); Chicago, IL
MVC tournament
March 13, 2026; 6:00 pm, ESPN+	(2)	vs. (10) Evansville; Quarterfinals	L 63–76	20–12	Xtream Arena; Coralville, IA
*Non-conference game. ^{#}Rankings from AP Poll. (#) Tournament seedings in parentheses. All times are in Central.
