= 2025–26 Illinois Fighting Illini women's basketball team =

Intercollegiate basketball season

2025–26 Illinois Fighting Illini women's basketball

NCAA tournament, Second Round
- Conference: Big Ten Conference
- Record: 22–12 (9–9 Big Ten)
- Head coach: Shauna Green (4th season)
- Associate head coach: Calamity McEntire
- Assistant coaches: Jackie Alexander; Britney Anderson; DeAntoine Beasley; Emily Durr
- Home arena: State Farm Center

2025–26 Big Ten women's basketball standings
	Conf.				Overall
Team	W		L	PCT	W		L	PCT
No. 1 UCLA †	18	–	0	1.000	37	–	1	.974
No. 7 Michigan	15	–	3	.833	28	–	7	.800
No. 16 Iowa	15	–	3	.833	27	–	7	.794
No. 17 Ohio State	13	–	5	.722	27	–	8	.771
No. 15 Minnesota	13	–	5	.722	24	–	9	.727
No. 20 Maryland	11	–	7	.611	24	–	9	.727
No. 22 Michigan State	11	–	7	.611	23	–	9	.719
No. 25 Washington	10	–	8	.556	22	–	11	.667
USC	9	–	9	.500	18	–	14	.563
Illinois	9	–	9	.500	22	–	12	.647
Oregon	8	–	10	.444	23	–	13	.639
Nebraska	7	–	11	.389	19	–	13	.594
Indiana	6	–	12	.333	18	–	14	.563
Purdue	5	–	13	.278	13	–	17	.433
Wisconsin	5	–	13	.278	16	–	18	.471
Penn State	4	–	14	.222	11	–	18	.379
Northwestern	2	–	16	.111	8	–	21	.276
Rutgers	1	–	17	.056	9	–	20	.310
† 2026 Big Ten tournament winner Rankings from AP poll

The 2025–26 Illinois Fighting Illini women's basketball team represents the University of Illinois during the 2025–26 NCAA Division I women's basketball season. The Fighting Illini are led by fourth-year head coach Shauna Green, and they play their home games at State Farm Center. This season marks the program's 44th season as a member of the Big Ten Conference.

== Previous season ==
The Illini finished the 2024–25 season with a 22–10 record, 11–7 in Big Ten play to finish in a three way tie for fifth place. As the No. 7 seed in the Big Ten tournament, they lost in the second round to Nebraska. They received an at-large bid to the NCAA tournament as the No. 8 seed in the Birmingham 3 region. They defeated Creighton, which was their first NCAA tournament win since 2000, before losing in the second round to Texas.

=== Accolades ===
Three Illini players earned All-Big Ten honors after the end of the 2024–2025 season. Kendall Bostic was named to the league's first team in both the media and coaches' polls, Genesis Bryant was voted to the second team by the media and the coaches, and Adalia McKenzie was recognized as an honorable mention by the media. Bostic ended her playing career as the program's all-time leading rebounder and was tied with Jenna Smith for most career double-doubles.

== Off-season ==
On April 23, 2025, Illinois announced the hiring of Jackie Alexander as an assistant coach, replacing Liza Fruendt. Alexander arrived at Illinois after one season as assistant coach and recruiting coordinator for the Toledo Rockets, having worked previously at other institutions since 2017.

In October 2025, it was announced that two incoming players would miss the entire season due to injuries. Forward Manuella Alves suffered a torn ACL in preseason workouts and guard Erica Finney had bilateral knee procedures.

=== Departures ===
Departures
Name	Number	Pos.	Height	Year	Hometown	Reason for departure
Genesis Bryant	1	G	5'6"	Graduate Student	Jonesboro, GA	Graduated
Cori Allen	2	G	5'10"	Sophomore	Nashville, TN	Transferred to Memphis
Makira Cook	3	G	5'6"	Graduate Student	Cincinnati, OH	Graduated
Shay Bollin	22	F	6'3"	Junior	Raynah, MA	Transferred to Wisconsin
Brynn Shoup-Hill	23	F	6'3"	Senior	Goshen, IN	Graduated
Adalia McKenzie	24	G	5'10"	Senior	Brooklyn Park, MN	Graduated
Kendall Bostic	44	F	6'2"	Graduate Student	Kokomo, IN	Graduated

=== Incoming transfers ===
Incoming transfers
Name	Number	Pos.	Height	Year	Hometown	Previous school
Aaliyah Guyton	1	G	5'7"	Sophomore	Peoria, IL	Iowa
Gisela Segura	24	F	5'11"	Graduate Student	Cervera, Spain	LIU
Maddie Webber	34	G	5'11"	Junior	Bridgeville, PA	Villanova

=== 2025 recruiting class ===
College recruiting information
Name	Hometown	School	Height	Weight	Commit date
Destiny Jackson; PG	Chicago, IL	Whitney Young High School	5 ft 6 in (1.68 m)	N/A	
Destiny Jackson; PG	Recruit ratings: ESPN: (96)				
Cearah Parchment; F	Fort Erie, ON	Fort Erie International Academy	6 ft 2 in (1.88 m)	N/A	
Cearah Parchment; F	Recruit ratings: ESPN: (94)				
Manuella Alves-Fernandez; F	Rio de Janeiro, Brazil	IMG Academy	6 ft 2 in (1.88 m)	N/A	
Manuella Alves-Fernandez; F	Recruit ratings: ESPN: (94)				
Naomi Benson; W	Streetsboro, OH	Streetsboro High School	6 ft 2 in (1.88 m)	N/A	
Naomi Benson; W	Recruit ratings: ESPN: (91)				
Overall recruit ranking:
Note: In many cases, Scout, Rivals, 247Sports, On3, and ESPN may conflict in their listings of height and weight.; In these cases, the average was taken. ESPN grades are on a 100-point scale.; Sources: "2025 Player Commits". ESPN. Archived from the original on August 26, 2025.

== Roster ==
2025–26 Illinois Fighting Illini women's basketball team
Players
Coaches

Pos.	#	Name	Height	Year	Previous school	Hometown
G	1	Aaliyah Guyton	5 ft 7 in (1.7 m)	So	Iowa	Peoria, IL
G	2	Destiny Jackson	5 ft 6 in (1.68 m)	Fr	Whitney Young	Chicago, IL
G	3	Erica Finney (injured)	6 ft 0 in (1.83 m)	Fr	Cammeraygal	Sydney, Australia
G	4	Gretchen Dolan (injured)	5 ft 11 in (1.8 m)	RS So	Williamsville South	Buffalo, NY
F	6	Irene Noya Catoira	6 ft 3 in (1.91 m)	So	Institut Joaquim Blume	Vilagarcía de Arousa, Pontevedra, Galicia, Spain
G	8	Jasmine Brown-Hagger	5 ft 9 in (1.75 m)	Jr	Mississippi State	Shorewood, IL
F	11	Manuella Alves (injured)	6 ft 3 in (1.91 m)	Fr	IMG Academy	Rio de Janeiro, Brazil
G	12	Mia Zenere (W)	5 ft 11 in (1.8 m)	So	Example Academy	Mokena, IL
F	21	Naomi Benson	6 ft 2 in (1.88 m)	Fr	Streetsboro	Streetsboro, OH
F	23	Berry Wallace	6 ft 1 in (1.85 m)	So	Pickerington Central	Pickerington, OH
F	24	Gisela Segura	5 ft 11 in (1.8 m)	GS	LIU	Cervera, Spain
C	25	Hayven Smith	6 ft 6 in (1.98 m)	So	Lincoln Way East	Frankfort, IL
F	30	Cearah Parchment	6 ft 3 in (1.91 m)	Fr	Fort Erie International Academy	Whitby, ON, Canada
G	34	Maddie Webber	5 ft 11 in (1.8 m)	Jr	Villanova	Bridgeville, PA
C	35	Lety Vasconcelos	6 ft 7 in (2.01 m)	RS So	Baylor	Miguel Calmon, Bahia, Brazil

Head coach

- Shauna Green (Canisius)

Assistant coach(es)

- Calamity McEntire (Eastern Oklahoma State)
- Jackie Alexander (Cumberlands)
- Britney Anderson (Virginia Tech)
- DeAntoine Beasley (Tennessee Tech)
- Emily Durr (Iowa State)

Legend

- (C) Team captain
- (S) Suspended
- (I) Ineligible
- (W) Walk-on
- Injured
- Current redshirt

Roster

== Schedule and results ==
Date time, TV	Rank^{#}	Opponent^{#}	Result	Record	High points	High rebounds	High assists	Site (attendance) city, state
Exhibition
October 30, 2025*; 6:00 p.m., B1G+		Maryville	W 79–60	0–0	22 – Parchment	13 – Parchment	4 – Tied	State Farm Center (4,149); Champaign, IL
Regular season
November 4, 2025*; 6:00 p.m., B1G+		Southeast Missouri State	W 91–67	1–0	27 – Wallace	11 – Wallace	7 – Dolan	State Farm Center (4,227); Champaign, IL
November 9, 2025*; 12:00 p.m., B1G+		Illinois State	W 75–65	2–0	22 – Wallace	9 – Parchment	5 – Dolan	State Farm Center (4,849); Champaign, IL
November 14, 2025*; 8:00 p.m., ESPN+		at Oregon State	L 59–64	2–1	24 – Wallace	6 – Tied	2 – Tied	Gill Coliseum (3,353); Corvallis, OR
November 18, 2025*; 11:00 a.m., B1G+		Murray State	W 84–64	3–1	22 – Wallace	11 – Parchment	5 – Jackson	State Farm Center (14,361); Champaign, IL
November 23, 2025*; 1:00 p.m., ACCNX/ESPN+		at Florida State	W 86–63	4–1	25 – Dolan	9 – Vasconselos	5 – Jackson	Donald L. Tucker Civic Center (1,502); Tallahassee, FL
November 26, 2025*; 6:00 p.m., B1G+		Western Kentucky	W 70–41	5–1	16 – Tied	8 – Parchment	4 – Guyton	State Farm Center (4,216); Champaign, IL
November 30, 2025*; 2:00 p.m., B1G+		Le Moyne	W 100–28	6–1	17 – Tied	7 – Parchment	8 – Jackson	State Farm Center (3,994); Champaign, IL
December 2, 2025*; 6:00 p.m., B1G+		Bellarmine	W 90–41	7–1	16 – Parchment	12 – Parchment	7 – Jackson	State Farm Center (3,979); Champaign, IL
December 6, 2025; 11:00 a.m., BTN		Indiana	W 78–57	8–1 (1–0)	16 – Tied	13 – Parchment	6 – Jackson	State Farm Center (4,712); Champaign, IL
December 10, 2025*; 6:00 p.m., SECN		at Missouri; Braggin' Rights	W 70–62	9–1	21 – Dolan	9 – Wallace	9 – Jackson	Mizzou Arena; Columbia, MO
December 14, 2025*; 2:00 p.m., B1G+		North Texas	W 81–69	10–1	28 – Wallace	9 – Wallace	4 – Dolan	State Farm Center (4,136); Champaign, IL
December 19, 2025*; 6:00 p.m., B1G+		Jackson State	W 86–43	11–1	13 – Guyton	7 – Tied	7 – Jackson	State Farm Center (4,112); Champaign, IL
December 28, 2025; 11:00 a.m., BTN		at Purdue	W 83–73	12–1 (2–0)	21 – Wallace	8 – Parchment	4 – Jackson	Mackey Arena (6,031); West Lafayette, IN
January 1, 2026; 3:00 p.m., BTN		No. 7 Maryland	W 73–70	13–1 (3–0)	22 – Wallace	8 – Parchment	3 – Tied	State Farm Center (5,207); Champaign, IL
January 4, 2026; 11:00 a.m., BTN		at No. 24 Michigan State	L 75–81	13–2 (3–1)	22 – Tied	10 – Jackson	6 – Jackson	Breslin Center (5,114); East Lansing, MI
January 7, 2026; 6:00 p.m., B1G+		No. 19 Ohio State	L 69–78	13–3 (3–2)	20 – Parchment	8 – Parchment	3 – Tied	State Farm Center (4,237); Champaign, IL
January 11, 2026; 2:00 p.m., BTN		at Penn State	W 92–76	14–3 (4–2)	28 – Wallace	8 – Wallace	9 – Jackson	Bryce Jordan Center (1,945); State College, PA
January 15, 2026; 6:00 p.m., Peacock	No. 25	at No. 8 Michigan	L 69–85	14–4 (4–3)	26 – Wallace	8 – Parchment	5 – Guyton	Crisler Center (3,108); Ann Arbor, MI
January 18, 2026; 2:00 p.m., B1G+	No. 25	Northwestern	W 74–71	15–4 (5–3)	29 – Wallace	11 – Parchment	4 – Brown-Hagger	State Farm Center (5,068); Champaign, IL
January 24, 2026; 1:00 p.m., BTN		at No. 24 Nebraska	L 75–81	15–5 (5–4)	25 – Parchment	11 – Parchment	3 – Tied	Pinnacle Bank Arena (7,683); Lincoln, NE
January 28, 2026; 6:00 p.m., B1G+		No. 2 UCLA	L 67–80	15–6 (5–5)	26 – Parchment	7 – Parchment	6 – Jackson	State Farm Center (4,756); Champaign, IL
February 1, 2026; 5:00 p.m., FS1		at No. 25 Washington	W 75–66	16–6 (6–5)	23 – Parchment	10 – Parchment	4 – Jackson	Alaska Airlines Arena (4,691); Seattle, WA
February 4, 2026; 8:00 p.m., B1G+		at Oregon	L 73–76	16–7 (6–6)	19 – Wallace	6 – Tied	7 – Jackson	Matthew Knight Arena (4,397); Eugene, OR
February 8, 2026; 12:00 p.m., B1G+		USC	L 62–70	16–8 (6–7)	17 – Jackson	12 – Parchment	8 – Jackson	State Farm Center (15,544); Champaign, IL
February 11, 2026; 6:00 p.m., B1G+		Wisconsin	W 92–60	17–8 (7–7)	22 – Guyton	15 – Parchment	6 – Tied	State Farm Center (4,458); Champaign, IL
February 17, 2026; 6:00 p.m., BTN		Rutgers	W 76–56	18–8 (8–7)	21 – Wallace	10 – Parchment	8 – Jackson	State Farm Center (4,373); Champaign, IL
February 22, 2026; 2:00 p.m., B1G+		at Northwestern	W 92–65	19–8 (9–7)	19 – Tied	10 – Parchment	7 – Jackson	Welsh–Ryan Arena (3,046); Evanston, IL
February 26, 2026; 8:00 p.m., BTN		at No. 9 Iowa	L 78–82	19–9 (9–8)	21 – Wallace	12 – Parchment	6 – Jackson	Carver–Hawkeye Arena (14,998); Iowa City, IA
March 1, 2026; 1:00 p.m., BTN		No. 22 Minnesota	L 73–78	19–10 (9–9)	15 – Wallace	7 – Wallace	5 – Brown-Hagger	State Farm Center (5,785); Champaign, IL
Big Ten tournament
March 4, 2026; 5:00 p.m., Peacock	(10)	vs. (15) Wisconsin; First Round	W 82–70	20–10	22 – Wallace	6 – Tied	5 – Jackson	Gainbridge Fieldhouse (6,587); Indianapolis, IN
March 5, 2026; 5:30 p.m., BTN	(10)	vs. (7) No. 18 Michigan State; Second Round	W 71–69	21–10	15 – Parchment	6 – Tied	5 – Jackson	Gainbridge Fieldhouse (5,149); Indianapolis, IN
March 6, 2026; 5:30 p.m., BTN	(10)	vs. (2) No. 9 Iowa; Quarterfinals	L 58–64	21–11	22 – Brown-Hagger	9 – Parchment	6 – Jackson	Gainbridge Fieldhouse (6,053); Indianapolis, IN
NCAA tournament
March 21, 2026*; 8:30 p.m., ESPN2	(7 FW1)	vs. (10 FW1) Colorado; First Round	W 66–57	22–11	21 – Parchment	11 – Jackson	6 – Jackson	Memorial Gymnasium (4,111); Nashville, TN
March 23, 2026*; 6:00 p.m., ESPN2	(7 FW1)	at (2 FW1) No. 6 Vanderbilt; Second Round	L 57–75	22–12	18 – Wallace	9 – Wallace	3 – Jackson	Memorial Gymnasium (4,440); Nashville, TN
*Non-conference game. ^{#}Rankings from AP Poll. (#) Tournament seedings in parentheses. Fort Worth 1=FW1. All times are in Central.

== Rankings ==
Ranking movements Legend: ██ Increase in ranking ██ Decrease in ranking — = Not ranked RV = Received votes
	Week																				
Poll	Pre	1	2	3	4	5	6	7	8	9	10	11	12	13	14	15	16	17	18	19	Final
AP	RV	—	—	—	—	RV	RV	RV	RV	RV	25	RV	RV	RV	RV	RV	RV	RV	RV	RV	
Coaches	—	—	—	—	—	—	—	—	—	RV	RV	RV	RV	RV	—	—	—	—	RV	RV	

== See also ==
- 2025–26 Illinois Fighting Illini men's basketball team
