= 2025–26 Drake Bulldogs women's basketball team =

American college basketball season

2025–26 Drake Bulldogs women's basketball
- Conference: Missouri Valley Conference
- Record: 12–20 (10–10 MVC)
- Head coach: Allison Pohlman (5th season)
- Assistant coaches: Lisa Carlsen; Whitney Moia; Kelli Greenway; Kristin Rotert
- Home arena: Knapp Center (Capacity: 6,424)

2025–26 Missouri Valley Conference women's basketball standings
	Conf.				Overall
Team	W		L	PCT	W		L	PCT
Murray State †	19	–	1	.950	31	–	4	.886
Belmont	16	–	4	.800	20	–	12	.625
Illinois State	13	–	7	.650	24	–	14	.632
Northern Iowa	13	–	7	.650	18	–	14	.563
Bradley	13	–	7	.650	20	–	13	.606
Drake	10	–	10	.500	12	–	20	.375
UIC	9	–	11	.450	14	–	18	.438
Southern Illinois	7	–	13	.350	10	–	20	.333
Indiana State	5	–	15	.250	10	–	22	.313
Evansville	5	–	15	.250	10	–	25	.286
Valparaiso	0	–	20	.000	0	–	32	.000
† 2026 MVC tournament winner

The 2025–26 Drake Bulldogs women's basketball team represented Drake University during the 2025–26 NCAA Division I women's basketball season. The Bulldogs, led by fifth-year head coach Allison Pohlman, played their home games at the Knapp Center in Des Moines, Iowa as members of the Missouri Valley Conference (MVC).

The Bulldogs finished 12–20, and, excluding the Covid-impacted 2019–20 season, played no postseason games for the first time since their 2013–14 campaign where they finished 17–15.

== Previous season ==
The Bulldogs finished the 2024–25 season 22–12, 15–5 in MVC play, to finish in a second-place tie. In the MVC tournament, they defeated Illinois State in the quarterfinals, before falling to top-seeded Murray State in the semifinals. The Bulldogs received an invite to the 2025 WBIT, where they would be defeated by Marquette in the first round.

== Roster ==
2025–26 Drake Bulldogs women's basketball team
Players
Coaches

Pos.	#	Name	Height	Year	Previous school	Hometown
G	1	Mylea Monahan	5 ft 7 in (1.7 m)	Fr	Glencoe-Silver Lake	Silver Lake, MN
G	2	Grace Knutson	5 ft 10 in (1.78 m)	So	Cedar Falls	Cedar Falls, IA
G	3	Abbie Aalsma	5 ft 9 in (1.75 m)	Sr	Illinois State; Waupun	Waupun, WI
G	4	Shannon Fornshell	6 ft 1 in (1.85 m)	Jr	Wayzata	Plymouth, MN
G	5	Mya Crawford (injured)	5 ft 8 in (1.73 m)	Fr	Centennial	Ankeny, IA
G	11	Peyton McCabe	5 ft 7 in (1.7 m)	So	Skutt Catholic	Blair, NE
F	15	Maggie Taylor	6 ft 2 in (1.88 m)	So	Hill City	Rapid City, SD
G	17	Anna Becker	5 ft 10 in (1.78 m)	Fr	Seaman	Topeka, KS
G	20	Lexi Carlsen	5 ft 8 in (1.73 m)	So	Northern Illinois; Sycamore	Sycamore, IL
G	21	Ava Hawthorne	5 ft 9 in (1.75 m)	Sr	Gilbert	Ames, IA
G	22	Brooklin Dailey	6 ft 0 in (1.83 m)	Jr	Southeast Polk	Pleasant Hill, IA
F	23	Quinn Vice	6 ft 4 in (1.93 m)	Fr	Pleasant Valley	Bettendorf, IA
F	30	Taedyn Gray	6 ft 2 in (1.88 m)	Sr	Shawnee Mission West	Lenexa, KS

Head coach

- Allison Pohlman (Northern Iowa)

Assistant coach(es)

- Lisa Carlsen (Northwest Missouri State)
- Whitney Moia (MidAmerica Nazarene)
- Kelli Greenway (Iowa)
- Kristin Rotert (South Dakota State)

Legend

- (C) Team captain
- (S) Suspended
- (I) Ineligible
- (W) Walk-on
- Injured
- Current redshirt

Roster
Last update: October 20, 2025

== Schedule and results ==
Date time, TV	Rank^{#}	Opponent^{#}	Result	Record	High points	High rebounds	High assists	Site (attendance) city, state
Exhibition
October 28, 2025*; 6:00 pm		Dakota Wesleyan	W 77–57	–	19 – Aalsma	8 – Taylor	6 – Hawthorne	Knapp Center (1,726); Des Moines, IA
Regular Season
November 3, 2025*; 12:00 pm, ESPN+		at Eastern Illinois	W 83–65	1–0	22 – Tied	16 – Taylor	10 – McCabe	Groniger Arena (2,219); Charleston, IL
November 9, 2025*; 2:00 pm, MC22/ESPN+		Creighton	L 74–83	1–1	23 – Aalsma	7 – Taylor	5 – Hawthorne	Knapp Center (2,587); Des Moines, IA
November 13, 2025*; 7:30 pm, BTN		at No. 21 Iowa	L 58–100	1–2	19 – Knutson	6 – Dailey	4 – Knutson	Carver–Hawkeye Arena (14,998); Iowa City, IA
November 20, 2025*; 6:00 pm, MC22/ESPN+		No. 12 Iowa State	L 60–87	1–3	22 – Becker	9 – Taylor	3 – Tied	Knapp Center (4,026); Des Moines, IA
November 25, 2025*; 5:45 pm		vs. Arkansas; Music City Classic	L 72–79	1–4	21 – Vice	5 – Aalsma	6 – McCabe	Trevecca Trojan Fieldhouse (251); Nashville, TN
November 26, 2025*; 1:15 pm		vs. Northern Kentucky; Music City Classic	L 69–90	1–5	16 – Taylor	6 – Tied	4 – Tied	Trevecca Trojan Fieldhouse (252); Nashville, TN
December 3, 2025*; 11:00 am, ESPN+		Lindenwood	L 52–68	1–6	12 – Vice	6 – Knutson	3 – Knutson	Knapp Center (6,424); Des Moines, IA
December 7, 2025*; 2:00 pm, ESPN+		Western Illinois	L 74–80	1–7	24 – Knutson	10 – Taylor	4 – McCabe	Knapp Center (2,081); Des Moines, IA
December 13, 2025*; 1:00 pm, Midco Sports		at St. Thomas (MN)	L 50–70	1–8	16 – Knutson	10 – Taylor	5 – Carlsen	Lee & Penny Anderson Arena (601); Saint Paul, MN
December 17, 2025; 7:00 pm, ESPN+		at Indiana State	W 97–77	2–8 (1–0)	21 – Aalsma	7 – Becker	6 – Knutson	Hulman Center (1,082); Terre Haute, IN
December 21, 2025*; 2:00 pm, ESPN+		Minnesota	L 43–68	2–9	9 – Taylor	6 – Taylor	3 – Carlsen	Knapp Center (2,570); Des Moines, IA
December 29, 2025; 12:00 pm, ESPN+		at UIC	W 78–62	3–9 (2–0)	30 – Aalsma	9 – Becker	8 – Hawthorne	Credit Union 1 Arena (374); Chicago, IL
January 2, 2026; 6:00 pm, ESPN+		Southern Illinois	W 89–75	4–9 (3–0)	29 – Aalsma	12 – Vice	7 – Becker	Knapp Center (2,390); Des Moines, IA
January 9, 2026; 6:30 pm, ESPN+		at Belmont	L 69–78	4−10 (3−1)	18 – Aalsma	9 – Taylor	4 – Aalsma	Curb Event Center (818); Nashville, TN
January 11, 2026; 2:00 pm, ESPN+		at Murray State	L 67–95	4−11 (3−2)	11 – Tied	6 – Tied	3 – Aalsma	CFSB Center (1,652); Murray, KY
January 16, 2026; 6:00 pm, ESPN+		Bradley	L 64–71	4−12 (3−3)	22 – Becker	10 – Taylor	5 – Hawthorne	Knapp Center (2,183); Des Moines, IA
January 18, 2026; 1:00 pm, ESPN+		at Valparaiso	W 66–56	5−12 (4−3)	20 – Becker	10 – Taylor	5 – McCabe	Athletics-Recreation Center (310); Valparaiso, IN
January 23, 2026; 6:00 pm, ESPN+		Evansville	W 97–82	6−12 (5−3)	24 – Aalsma	7 – Carlsen	6 – Taylor	Knapp Center (2,231); Des Moines, IA
January 25, 2026; 2:00 pm, ESPN+		Murray State	L 88–89	6−13 (5−4)	24 – Aalsma	7 – Aalsma	6 – Aalsma	Knapp Center (2,417); Des Moines, IA
January 29, 2026; 6:00 pm, ESPN+		at Bradley	L 79–85	6−14 (5−5)	13 – Becker	7 – Vice	5 – Becker	Renaissance Coliseum (862); Peoria, IL
February 1, 2026; 2:00 pm, ESPN+		Northern Iowa; Rivalry	L 56–66	6−15 (5−6)	22 – Becker	5 – Tied	4 – Vice	Knapp Center (3,078); Des Moines, IA
February 5, 2026; 6:00 pm, ESPN+		Belmont	L 52–67	6−16 (5−7)	14 – Becker	7 – Aalsma	3 – Aalsma	Knapp Center (2,040); Des Moines, IA
February 7, 2026; 4:00 pm, ESPN+		at Illinois State	L 70–77	6−17 (5−8)	15 – Becker	8 – Taylor	4 – Aalsma	CEFCU Arena (2,183); Normal, IL
February 14, 2026; 2:00 pm, ESPN+		Indiana State; Pink Game	W 88–70	7−17 (6−8)	19 – Aalsma	12 – Dailey	5 – Knutson	Knapp Center (2,638); Des Moines, IA
February 19, 2026; 6:00 pm, ESPN+		Valparaiso	W 79–68	8−17 (7−8)	19 – Aalsma	10 – Becker	8 – Hawthorne	Knapp Center (1,911); Des Moines, IA
February 22, 2026; 2:00 pm, ESPN+		UIC	L 61–69	8−18 (7−9)	15 – Carlsen	6 – Taylor	3 – Hawthorne	Knapp Center (2,208); Des Moines, IA
February 26, 2026; 6:00 pm, ESPN+		at Evansville	W 87–85	9−18 (8−9)	24 – Aalsma	8 – Taylor	7 – Carlsen	Meeks Family Fieldhouse (382); Evansville, IN
February 28, 2026; 2:00 pm, ESPN+		at Southern Illinois	W 83–68	10−18 (9−9)	20 – Becker	9 – Taylor	7 – Hawthorne	Banterra Center (521); Carbondale, IL
March 5, 2026; 6:00 pm, ESPN+		Illinois State	W 73–55	11−18 (10−9)	17 – Aalsma	8 – Knutson	4 – Tied	Knapp Center (2,171); Des Moines, IA
March 8, 2026; 2:00 pm, ESPN+		at Northern Iowa; Rivalry	L 58–65	11−19 (10−10)	14 – Becker	5 – Tied	2 – Tied	McLeod Center (3,032); Cedar Falls, IA
MVC Tournament
March 12, 2026; 8:30 pm, ESPN+	(6)	vs. (11) Valparaiso; Opening Round	W 81–55	12−19	16 – Aalsma	9 – Taylor	5 – Hawthorne	Xtream Arena (912); Coralville, IA
March 13, 2026; 8:30 pm, ESPN+	(6)	vs. (3) Illinois State; Quarterfinals	L 62–69	12−20	24 – Aalsma	5 – Carlsen	4 – Hawthorne	Xtream Arena (954); Coralville, IA
*Non-conference game. ^{#}Rankings from AP poll. (#) Tournament seedings in parentheses. All times are in Central.

== See also ==
- 2025-26 Drake Bulldogs men's basketball team
