= 2025–26 Ohio State Buckeyes women's basketball team =

American college basketball season

2025–26 Ohio State Buckeyes women's basketball

Baha Mar Hoops Pink Flamingo Goombay Division champions

NCAA tournament, Second Round
- Conference: Big Ten Conference

Ranking
- Coaches: No. 15
- AP: No. 17
- Record: 27–8 (13–5 Big Ten)
- Head coach: Kevin McGuff (13th season)
- Associate head coach: Carla Morrow
- Assistant coaches: Jalen Powell; Ryan Murray; Katie Smith
- Home arena: Value City Arena

2025–26 Big Ten women's basketball standings
	Conf.				Overall
Team	W		L	PCT	W		L	PCT
No. 1 UCLA †	18	–	0	1.000	37	–	1	.974
No. 7 Michigan	15	–	3	.833	28	–	7	.800
No. 16 Iowa	15	–	3	.833	27	–	7	.794
No. 17 Ohio State	13	–	5	.722	27	–	8	.771
No. 15 Minnesota	13	–	5	.722	24	–	9	.727
No. 20 Maryland	11	–	7	.611	24	–	9	.727
No. 22 Michigan State	11	–	7	.611	23	–	9	.719
No. 25 Washington	10	–	8	.556	22	–	11	.667
USC	9	–	9	.500	18	–	14	.563
Illinois	9	–	9	.500	22	–	12	.647
Oregon	8	–	10	.444	23	–	13	.639
Nebraska	7	–	11	.389	19	–	13	.594
Indiana	6	–	12	.333	18	–	14	.563
Purdue	5	–	13	.278	13	–	17	.433
Wisconsin	5	–	13	.278	16	–	18	.471
Penn State	4	–	14	.222	11	–	18	.379
Northwestern	2	–	16	.111	8	–	21	.276
Rutgers	1	–	17	.056	9	–	20	.310
† 2026 Big Ten tournament winner Rankings from AP poll

The 2025–26 Ohio State Buckeyes women's basketball team represented Ohio State University during the 2025–26 NCAA Division I women's basketball season. The Buckeyes were led by head coach Kevin McGuff in his 13th season and played their home games at Value City Arena in Columbus, Ohio as a member of the Big Ten Conference.

== Previous season ==
The Buckeyes finished the 2024–25 season 26–7, 13–5 in Big Ten play to finish in a tie for fourth place. As the No. 3 seed in the Big Ten tournament, they defeated Iowa in the quarterfinals before losing to UCLA in the semifinals. They received an at-large bid to the NCAA tournament as the No. 4 seed in the Birmingham 3 region. They defeated Montana State in the first round before losing to Tennessee in the second round.

== Offseason ==
=== Departures ===
Ohio State departures
Name	Num	Pos.	Height	Year	Hometown	Reason for departure
Madison Greene	0	G	5'8"	Graduate student	Pickerington, ON	Graduated
Ajae Petty	1	F	6'3"	Graduate student	Baltimore, MD	Graduated/undrafted in 2025 WNBA draft; signed with the Minnesota Lynx
Taylor Thierry	2	G/F	6'0"	Senior	Cleveland, OH	Graduated/2025 WNBA draft; selected 36th overall by Atlanta Dream
Kaia Henderson	11	G	5'6"	Junior	Utica, NY	Transferred to Boston College
Cotie McMahon	32	F	6'0"	Junior	Centerville, OH	Transferred to Ole Miss
Faith Carson	54	C	6'4"	Sophomore	Buchanan, MI	Transferred to Grand Canyon
Eboni Walker	55	F	6'0"	Graduate student	Las Vegas, NV	Graduated

=== Incoming transfers ===
Ohio State incoming transfers
Name	Num	Pos.	Height	Year	Hometown	Previous school
Kylee Kitts	1	G/F	6'4"	(redshirt) Freshman	Oviedo, FL	Florida
T'Yana Todd	4	G	6'0"	Senior	Vaughan, ON	Boston College

=== 2025 recruiting class ===
College recruiting
Name	Hometown	School	Height	Weight	Commit date
Daria Biriuk; G	Bell Buckle, TN	The Webb School	6 ft 1 in (1.85 m)	N/A	
Daria Biriuk; G	Recruit ratings: ESPN: (92)				
Brynleigh Martin; G	Springboro, OH	Springboro High School	6 ft 0 in (1.83 m)	N/A	
Brynleigh Martin; G	Recruit ratings: ESPN: (92)				
Overall recruit ranking:
Note: In many cases, Scout, Rivals, 247Sports, On3, and ESPN may conflict in their listings of height and weight.; In these cases, the average was taken. ESPN grades are on a 100-point scale.; Sources: "2025 Player Commits". ESPN. Archived from the original on September 8, 2025.

==== Recruiting class of 2026 ====
College recruiting (2026)
Name	Hometown	School	Height	Weight	Commit date
Atlee Vanesko; PG	Ocean City, NJ	Westtown School	5 ft 10 in (1.78 m)	N/A	
Atlee Vanesko; PG	Recruit ratings: ESPN: (91)				
Overall recruit ranking:
Note: In many cases, Scout, Rivals, 247Sports, On3, and ESPN may conflict in their listings of height and weight.; In these cases, the average was taken. ESPN grades are on a 100-point scale.; Sources: "2026 Player Commits". ESPN. Archived from the original on September 8, 2025.

==== Recruiting class of 2027 ====
College recruiting (2027)
Name	Hometown	School	Height	Weight	Commit date
Myella Chapman; PG	Oakland, CA	Bishop O'Dowd High School	5 ft 8 in (1.73 m)	N/A	
Myella Chapman; PG	Recruit ratings: ESPN: (92)				
Overall recruit ranking:
Note: In many cases, Scout, Rivals, 247Sports, On3, and ESPN may conflict in their listings of height and weight.; In these cases, the average was taken. ESPN grades are on a 100-point scale.; Sources: "2027 Player Commits". ESPN. Archived from the original on September 8, 2025.

== Roster ==
2025–26 Ohio State Buckeyes women's basketball team
Players
Coaches

Pos.	#	Name	Height	Year	Previous school	Hometown
G/F	1	Kylee Kitts	6 ft 4 in (1.93 m)	RS Fr	Hagerty; Florida	Oviedo, FL
G	2	Chance Gray	5 ft 9 in (1.75 m)	Sr	Winton Woods; Oregon	Cincinnati, OH
G	3	Kennedy Cambridge	5 ft 8 in (1.73 m)	RS Jr	Ensworth; Kentucky	Nashville, TN
G	4	T'Yana Todd	6 ft 0 in (1.83 m)	Sr	IMG Academy; Boston College	Vaughan, ON
G	5	Ava Watson	5 ft 8 in (1.73 m)	So	Buford	Buford, GA
G	7	Dasha Biriuk	6 ft 1 in (1.85 m)	Fr	Webb School	Berdianski, Ukraine
G	8	Bryn Martin	6 ft 1 in (1.85 m)	Fr	Springboro	Springboro, OH
C	12	Elsa Lemmilä	6 ft 6 in (1.98 m)	So	Tapiolan Honka Club	Espoo, Finland
F	14	Ella Hobbs	6 ft 4 in (1.93 m)	RS Fr	Jay M. Robinson	Concord, NC
F	15	Seini Henry	6 ft 0 in (1.83 m)	RS Fr	Purcell Marian	Charlotte, NC
G	22	Jaloni Cambridge	5 ft 7 in (1.7 m)	So	Montverde Academy	Nashville, TN

Head coach

- Kevin McGuff (Saint Joseph's (IN))

Assistant coach(es)

- Carla Morrow (Tulsa)
- Jalen Powell (Mississippi)
- Ryan Murray (Ohio State)
- Katie Smith (Ohio State)

Legend

- (C) Team captain
- (S) Suspended
- (I) Ineligible
- (W) Walk-on
- Injured
- Current redshirt

Roster

== Schedule and results ==
Date time, TV	Rank^{#}	Opponent^{#}	Result	Record	High points	High rebounds	High assists	Site city, state
Regular season
November 9, 2025*; 1:00 p.m., B1G+		Coppin State	W 88–59	1–0	23 – J. Cambridge	8 – J. Cambridge	6 – J. Cambridge	Value City Arena (5,504); Columbus, OH
November 13, 2025*; 6:30 p.m., B1G+		Bellarmine	W 90–33	2–0	18 – J. Cambridge	10 – Hobbs	4 – Martin	Value City Arena (4,671); Columbus, OH
November 16, 2025*; 12:00 p.m., Peacock		at No. 1 UConn	L 68–100	2–1	17 – J. Cambridge	10 – Kitts	2 – Tied	PeoplesBank Arena (14,115); Hartford, CT
November 19, 2025*; 6:30 p.m., B1G+		Kent State	W 88–68	3–1	19 – J. Cambridge	7 – K. Cambridge	5 – J. Cambridge	Value City Arena (4,617); Columbus, OH
November 24, 2025*; 11:00 a.m., FloHoops		vs. Belmont; Pink Flamingo Championship Goombay Division Semifinal	W 68–56	4–1	26 – J. Cambridge	15 – Kitts	3 – K. Cambridge	Baha Mar Convention Center (237); Nassau, Bahamas
November 26, 2025*; 1:30 p.m., FloHoops		vs. No. 21 West Virginia; Pink Flamingo Championship Goombay Division final	W 83–81	5–1	22 – J. Cambridge	7 – Lemmilä	7 – Gray	Baha Mar Convention Center (237); Nassau, Bahamas
November 30, 2025*; 1:00 p.m., B1G+		Niagara	W 130–32	6–1	25 – Biriuk	10 – Henry	10 – Watson	Value City Arena (5,239); Columbus, OH
December 7, 2025; 2:00 p.m., BTN	No. 23	at Northwestern	W 79–70	7–1 (1–0)	22 – J. Cambridge	9 – Lemmilä	6 – K. Cambridge	Welsh–Ryan Arena (1,515); Evanston, IL
December 11, 2025*; 6:30 p.m., B1G+	No. 21	Northern Kentucky	W 94–62	8–1	33 – J. Cambridge	6 – J. Cambridge	5 – K. Cambridge	Value City Arena (4,672); Columbus, OH
December 14, 2025*; 1:00 p.m., B1G+	No. 21	Toledo	W 85–60	9–1	23 – K. Cambridge	13 – Kitts	8 – J. Cambridge	Value City Arena (5,652); Columbus, OH
December 18, 2025*; 6:30 p.m., B1G+	No. 21	Norfolk State	W 79–45	10–1	13 – Kitts	10 – Kitts	6 – K. Cambridge	Value City Arena (4,816); Columbus, OH
December 22, 2025*; 6:30 p.m., B1G+	No. 19	Western Michigan	W 95–47	11–1	15 – Lemmilä	9 – Kitts	6 – Watson	Value City Arena (5,078); Columbus, OH
December 28, 2025; 2:00 p.m., BTN	No. 19	No. 4 UCLA	L 75–82	11–2 (1–1)	28 – J. Cambridge	9 – K. Cambridge	4 – Tied	Value City Arena (8,455); Columbus, OH
December 31, 2025; 12:00 p.m., BTN	No. 19	at Purdue	W 83–56	12–2 (2–1)	16 – K. Cambridge	10 – Kitts	7 – J. Cambridge	Mackey Arena (4,102); West Lafayette, IN
January 4, 2025; 2:00 p.m., BTN	No. 19	Rutgers	W 71–49	13–2 (3–1)	18 – J. Cambridge	11 – Lemmilä	7 – K. Cambridge	Value City Arena (6,201); Columbus, OH
January 7, 2026; 7:00 p.m., B1G+	No. 19	at Illinois	W 78–69	14–2 (4–1)	41 – J. Cambridge	8 – Lemmilä	6 – J. Cambridge	State Farm Center (4,237); Champaign, IL
January 11, 2026; 4:00 p.m., Peacock	No. 19	at No. 8 Maryland	W 89–76	15–2 (5–1)	28 – J. Cambridge	11 – Lemmilä	8 – J. Cambridge	Xfinity Center (8,623); College Park, MD
January 14, 2026; 6:30 p.m., B1G+	No. 14	Penn State	W 108–84	16–2 (6–1)	33 – J. Cambridge	6 – Kitts	8 – K. Cambridge	Value City Arena (5,884); Columbus, OH
January 19, 2026*; 12:00 p.m., FOX	No. 12	vs. No. 9 TCU; Coretta Scott King Classic	W 71–69	17–2	22 – Gray	7 – Lemmilä	8 – J. Cambridge	Prudential Center (6,742); Newark, NJ
January 22, 2026; 8:00 p.m., Peacock	No. 12	Indiana	W 81–67	18–2 (7–1)	22 – J. Cambridge	6 – Lemmilä	5 – J. Cambridge	Value City Arena (5,242); Columbus, OH
January 25, 2026; 2:00 p.m., BTN	No. 12	at No. 10 Iowa	L 70–91	18–3 (7–2)	26 – J. Cambridge	10 – J. Cambridge	4 – J. Cambridge	Carver–Hawkeye Arena (14,998); Iowa, City, IA
January 29, 2026; 8:00 p.m., BTN	No. 11	Wisconsin	W 81–58	19–3 (8–2)	29 – J. Cambridge	14 – Lemmilä	5 – Watson	Value City Arena (4,855); Columbus, OH
February 1, 2026; 6:00 p.m., BTN	No. 11	Nebraska	W 90–71	20–3 (9–2)	30 – J. Cambridge	8 – K. Cambridge	6 – J. Cambridge	Value City Arena (7,608); Columbus, OH
February 5, 2026; 9:00 p.m., Peacock	No. 9	at No. 24 Washington	W 70–60	21–3 (10–2)	26 – J. Cambridge	9 – Lemmilä	4 – Gray	Alaska Airlines Arena (3,394); Seattle, WA
February 8, 2026; 3:00 p.m., B1G+	No. 9	at Oregon	W 80–64	22–3 (11–2)	23 – Lemmilä	9 – Lemmilä	8 – J. Cambridge	Matthew Knight Arena (5,371); Eugene, OR
February 15, 2026; 2:00 p.m., FS1	No. 8	No. 20 Maryland	L 75–76	22–4 (11–3)	29 – J. Cambridge	8 – J. Cambridge	5 – J. Cambridge	Value City Arena (7,504); Columbus, OH
February 18, 2026; 8:00 p.m., B1G+	No. 10	at No. 23 Minnesota	L 61–74	22–5 (11–4)	23 – J. Cambridge	10 – Lemmilä	6 – J. Cambridge	Williams Arena (4,025); Minneapolis, MN
February 22, 2026; 2:00 p.m., FS1	No. 10	USC	W 88–83	23–5 (12–4)	33 – J. Cambridge	10 – Lemmilä	3 – Tied	Value City Arena (8,144); Columbus, OH
February 25, 2026; 8:00 p.m., Peacock	No. 13	No. 8 Michigan; Rivalry	L 86–88 ^{OT}	23–6 (12–5)	22 – J. Cambridge	15 – Lemmilä	9 – J. Cambridge	Value City Arena (6,663); Columbus, OH
March 1, 2026; 12:00 p.m., BTN	No. 13	at No. 15 Michigan State	W 87–68	24–6 (13–5)	33 – J. Cambridge	10 – Lemmilä	8 – K. Cambridge	Breslin Center (6,214); East Lansing, MI
Big Ten Women's Tournament
March 5, 2026; 2:30 p.m., BTN	(5) No. 11	vs. (13) Indiana; Second Round	W 83–59	25–6	19 – J. Cambridge	13 – Lemmilä	6 – Gray	Gainbridge Fieldhouse (5,962); Indianapolis, IN
March 6, 2026; 2:30 p.m., BTN	(5) No. 11	vs. (4) No. 19 Minnesota; Quarterfinals	W 60–55	26–6	17 – Lemmilä	11 – Lemmilä	6 – J. Cambridge	Gainbridge Fieldhouse (5,146); Indianapolis, IN
March 6, 2026; 2:00 p.m., BTN	(5) No. 11	vs. (1) No. 2 UCLA; Semifinals	L 62–72	26–7	23 – Gray	8 – K. Cambridge	6 – Lemmilä	Gainbridge Fieldhouse (6,387); Indianapolis, IN
NCAA Tournament
March 21, 2026*; 11:30 a.m., ESPN2	(3 FW1) No. 12	(14 FW1) Howard; First Round	W 75–54	27–7	21 – J. Cambridge	11 – Lemmilä	4 – Gray	Value City Arena (6,169); Columbus, OH
March 23, 2026*; 4:00 p.m., ESPN	(3 FW1) No. 12	(6 FW1) No. 22 Notre Dame; Second Round	L 73–83	27–8	41 – J. Cambridge	10 – Lemmilä	4 – K. Cambridge	Value City Arena; Columbus, OH
*Non-conference game. ^{#}Rankings from AP Poll. (#) Tournament seedings in parentheses. Fort Worth 1=FW1. All times are in Eastern. Source:

== Rankings ==
Ranking movements Legend: ██ Increase in ranking ██ Decrease in ranking RV = Received votes
	Week																				
Poll	Pre	1	2	3	4	5	6	7	8	9	10	11	12	13	14	15	16	17	18	19	Final
AP	RV	RV	RV	RV	23	21	21	19	19*	19	14	12	11	9	8	10	13	11	11	12	17
Coaches	24	25	RV	RV	24	21	21	19	20	19	15	11	12	9	8	10	12	11	11	11	15

*AP did not release a week 8 poll.

== See also ==
- 2025-26 Ohio State Buckeyes men's basketball team
