= 2025–26 Murray State Racers women's basketball team =

American collegiate basketball team season

2025–26 Murray State Racers women's basketball

MVC regular season and tournament champions

NCAA tournament, First Round
- Conference: Missouri Valley Conference
- Record: 31–4 (19–1 MVC)
- Head coach: Rechelle Turner (9th season)
- Associate head coach: Wyatt Foust
- Assistant coaches: Monica Evans; Kayla Kleifgen; Nieja Tucker; Katelyn Young
- Home arena: CFSB Center

2025–26 Missouri Valley Conference women's basketball standings
	Conf.				Overall
Team	W		L	PCT	W		L	PCT
Murray State †	19	–	1	.950	31	–	4	.886
Belmont	16	–	4	.800	20	–	12	.625
Illinois State	13	–	7	.650	24	–	14	.632
Northern Iowa	13	–	7	.650	18	–	14	.563
Bradley	13	–	7	.650	20	–	13	.606
Drake	10	–	10	.500	12	–	20	.375
UIC	9	–	11	.450	14	–	18	.438
Southern Illinois	7	–	13	.350	10	–	20	.333
Indiana State	5	–	15	.250	10	–	22	.313
Evansville	5	–	15	.250	10	–	25	.286
Valparaiso	0	–	20	.000	0	–	32	.000
† 2026 MVC tournament winner

The 2025–26 Murray State Racers women's basketball team represented Murray State University during the 2025–26 NCAA Division I women's basketball season. The Racers, led by ninth-year head coach Rechelle Turner, played their home games at the CFSB Center in Murray, Kentucky, as fourth-year members of the Missouri Valley Conference (MVC).

== Previous season ==
The Racers finished the 2024–25 season 25–8, 16–4 in MVC play, to finish to win the share title of Missouri Valley regular season title with Missouri State. As the No. 1 seed in the Missouri Valley tournament, they defeated Bradley, Drake and Belmont to earn an automatic trip to the NCAA Tournament as the No. 11 seed in the Spokane Regional 4, where they were defeated by Iowa Hawkeyes in the first round.

== Preseason ==
On October 22, 2025, the MVC released its preseason coaches poll. Murray State was picked to finish second in the MVC regular season, receiving thirteen of the forty-two first-place votes.

=== Preseason rankings ===
MVC preseason poll
Predicted finish	Team	Votes (1st place)
1	Belmont	446 (25)
2	Murray State	436 (13)
3	Illinois State	387 (2)
4	Drake	371 (4)

=== Preseason honors ===
"Players to Watch" List
Player	Position	Year	Hometown
Haven Ford	Guard	Junior	Morehead, KY
Halli Poock	Guard	Junior	Waterloo, IA
Keslyn Secrist	Guard	Junior	Draper, VA

== Roster ==
2025–26 Murray State Racers women's basketball team
Players
Coaches

Pos.	#	Name	Height	Year	Previous school	Hometown
G	0	Jada Cook	5 ft 8 in (1.73 m)	So	Patrick Henry High School	Roanoke, Virginia
G	1	Halli Poock	5 ft 6 in (1.68 m)	Jr	Bradley	Waterloo, Iowa
G	2	Haven Ford	5 ft 6 in (1.68 m)	Jr	Rowan County Senior High School	Morehead, Kentucky
G	3	Briley Pena	5 ft 4 in (1.63 m)	Sr	Nettleton High School	Jonesboro, Arkansas
F	4	Jaidynn Askins	6 ft 1 in (1.85 m)	Fr	Southside High School	Jackson, Tennessee
G	7	Alice Magnaini	6 ft 0 in (1.83 m)	Fr		Melbourne, Australia
G	11	Keslyn Secrist	5 ft 10 in (1.78 m)	Jr	Indiana State	Draper, Virginia
F	12	Ellery Minch	6 ft 3 in (1.91 m)	So	DePaul	McCordsville, Indiana
G	15	Gabby Spink	5 ft 9 in (1.75 m)	Fr	Gibson Southern High School	Haubstadt, Indiana
G	20	Braxcynn Baker	5 ft 11 in (1.8 m)	So	Lowell High School	Lowell, Michigan
F	22	Cam Hoover	6 ft 0 in (1.83 m)	RS Fr	Woodridge High School	Cuyahoga Falls, Ohio
F	23	Sharnecce Currie-Jelks	6 ft 2 in (1.88 m)	Sr	Indiana	Jackson, Tennessee
G/F	25	Destiny Thomas	5 ft 10 in (1.78 m)	Jr	McCracken County High School	Paducah, Kentucky

Head coach

- Rechelle Turner (Murray State)

Assistant coach(es)

- Wyatt Foust (Kentucky Wesleyan)
- Monica Evans (Murray State)
- Kayla Kleifgen (Eckerd)
- Nieja Tucker (Austin Peay)
- Katelyn Young (Murray State)

Legend

- (C) Team captain
- (S) Suspended
- (I) Ineligible
- (W) Walk-on
- Injured
- Current redshirt

Roster
Last update: March 16, 2026

== Schedule and results ==
Date time, TV	Rank^{#}	Opponent^{#}	Result	Record	Site (attendance) city, state
Exhibition
November 3, 2025*; 7:00 p.m., ESPN+		Trevecca Nazarene	W 102–61		CFSB Center; Murray, KY
Non-conference regular season
November 7, 2025*; 5:00 p.m., ESPN+		at Southern Indiana	W 79–77	1–0	Liberty Arena (1,352); Evansville, IN
November 11, 2025*; 7:00 p.m., SLN		at South Dakota State	L 65–79	1–1	First Bank and Trust Arena (2,151); Brookings, SD
November 15, 2025*; 7:00 p.m., ESPN+		Saint Louis	W 96–88	2–1	CFSB Center (1,721); Murray, KY
November 18, 2025*; 11:00 a.m., B1G+		at Illinois	L 64–84	2–2	State Farm Center (14,361); Champaign, IL
November 22, 2025*; 2:00 p.m., ESPN+		UAB	W 91–79	3–2	CFSB Center (1,612); Murray, KY
November 28, 2025*; 2:00 p.m., Baller TV		vs. George Mason; Daytona Beach Classic	W 88–83	4–2	Ocean Center (175); Daytona Beach, FL
November 29, 2025*; 10:00 a.m., Baller TV		vs. Boston College; Daytona Beach Classic	W 82–77	5–2	Ocean Center (120); Daytona Beach, FL
December 3, 2025*; 5:00 p.m., ESPN+		at Morehead State	W 91–79	6–2	Ellis Johnson Arena (840); Morehead, KY
December 6, 2025*; 5:00 p.m., ESPN+		at Austin Peay	W 74–56	7–2	F&M Bank Arena (681); Clarksville, TN
December 15, 2025*; 11:00 a.m., ESPN+		Memphis	W 85–57	8–2	CFSB Center (4,513); Murray, KY
December 20, 2025*; 2:00 p.m., ESPN+		Lindsey Wilson	W 101–44	9–2	CFSB Center (1,787); Murray, KY
MVC regular season
December 29, 2025; 6:00 p.m., ESPN+		at Evansville	W 90–80	10–2 (1–0)	Meeks Family Fieldhouse (623); Evansville, IN
January 2, 2026; 6:00 p.m., ESPN+		Illinois State	W 101–93 ^{2OT}	11–2 (2–0)	CFSB Center (1,857); Murray, KY
January 4, 2026; 6:30 p.m., ESPN+		Bradley	W 93–82 ^{2OT}	12–2 (3–0)	CFSB Center (1,417); Murray, KY
January 9, 2026; 6:00 p.m., ESPN+		Northern Iowa	W 75–71	13–2 (4–0)	CFSB Center (1,482); Murray, KY
January 11, 2026; 2:00 p.m., ESPN+		Drake	W 95–67	14–2 (5–0)	CFSB Center (1,652); Murray, KY
January 15, 2026; 6:00 p.m., ESPN+		at Southern Illinois	W 87–74	15–2 (6–0)	Banterra Center (374); Carbondale, IL
January 18, 2026; 2:00 p.m., ESPN+		Belmont	W 69–48	16–2 (7–0)	CFSB Center (2,101); Murray, KY
January 23, 2026; 6:00 p.m., ESPN+		at Northern Iowa	L 74–89	16–3 (7–1)	McLeod Center (2,487); Cedar Falls, IA
January 25, 2026; 2:00 p.m., ESPN+		at Drake	W 89–88	17–3 (8–1)	Knapp Center (2,417); Des Moines, IA
January 29, 2026; 6:00 p.m., ESPN+		Southern Illinois	W 79–75	18–3 (9–1)	CFSB Center (1,494); Murray, KY
January 31, 2026; 2:00 p.m., ESPN+		at Belmont	W 78–71	19–3 (10–1)	Curb Event Center (1,427); Nashville, TN
February 5, 2026; 2:00 p.m., ESPN+		at Indiana State	W 114–78	20–3 (11–1)	Hulman Center (1,054); Terre Haute, IN
February 13, 2026; 6:00 p.m., ESPN+		Valparaiso	W 95–69	21–3 (12–1)	CFSB Center; Murray, KY
February 15, 2026; 1:00 p.m., ESPN+		UIC	W 79–77	22–3 (13–1)	CFSB Center (1,875); Murray, KY
February 20, 2026; 2:00 p.m., ESPN+		at Bradley	W 72–40	23–3 (14–1)	Renaissance Coliseum (861); Peoria, IL
February 22, 2026; 2:00 p.m., ESPN+		at Illinois State	W 73–62	24–3 (15–1)	CEFCU Arena (2,792); Normal, IL
February 26, 2026; 6:00 p.m., ESPN+		Indiana State	W 115–67	25–3 (16–1)	CFSB Center (1,946); Murray, KY
February 28, 2026; 2:00 p.m., ESPN+		Evansville	W 99–80	26–3 (17–1)	CFSB Center (2,000); Murray, KY
March 5, 2026; 7:00 p.m., ESPN+		at UIC	W 78–76	27–3 (18–1)	Credit Union 1 Arena (496); Chicago, IL
March 7, 2026; 1:00 p.m., ESPN+		at Valparaiso	W 100–68	28–3 (19–1)	Athletics–Recreation Center (311); Valparaiso, IN
MVC tournament
March 13, 2026; 12:00 p.m., ESPN+	(1)	vs. (8) Indiana State; Quarterfinals	W 105–88	29–3	Xtream Arena; Coralville, IA
March 14, 2026; 1:30 p.m., ESPN+	(1)	vs. (4) Northern Iowa; Semifinals	W 72–59	30–3	Xtream Arena (922); Coralville, IA
March 15, 2026; 1:00 p.m., ESPN2	(1)	vs. (10) Evansville; Championship	W 91–70	31–3	Xtream Arena (854); Coralville, IA
NCAA tournament
March 20, 2026*; 2:00 p.m., ESPNU	(12 FW1)	vs. (5 FW1) No. 17 Maryland; First Round	L 67–99	31–4	Carmichael Arena; Chapel Hill, NC
*Non-conference game. ^{#}Rankings from AP Poll. (#) Tournament seedings in parentheses. Fort Worth 1=FW1. All times are in Central.
