= Addi Mack =

American basketball player (born 2007)

No. 3 – Maryland Terrapins
- Position: Point guard
- League: Big Ten Conference

Personal information
- Born: April 26, 2007 (age 19)
- Listed height: 5 ft 9 in (1.75 m)

Career information
- High school: Minnehaha Academy (Minneapolis, Minnesota)
- College: Maryland (2025–present)

Career highlights
- Big Ten All-Freshman Team (2026)

Addison Mack (born April 26, 2007) is an American college basketball player for the Maryland Terrapins of the Big Ten Conference.

== Early life ==
Mack attended Minnehaha Academy in Minneapolis, Minnesota. She began playing and starting on the varsity basketball team as a freshman. During her senior season, Mack surpassed 4,000 career points, becoming the second player in Minnesota high school basketball history to reach the mark. She finished her senior season averaging 34.2 points. 6.4 assists, 6.0 rebounds, and 4.3 steals per game, being named the East Metro Player of the Year. Mack committed to the University of Maryland, College Park to play college basketball.

== College career ==
Mack made an immediate impact as a freshman, establishing herself as one of the Terrapins' leading scorers. She was named National Freshman Player of the Week once during the season, in November. Mack finished her freshman season averaging 11.0 points per game and earning a selection to the Big Ten All-Freshman Team. In the season opener of her sophomore year, she scored 35 points, made six three-pointers, and recorded six assists in a loss to No. 1 South Carolina.

== Career statistics ==
Legend
GP	Games played	GS	Games started	MPG	Minutes per game	RPG	Rebounds per game
APG	Assists per game	SPG	Steals per game	BPG	Blocks per game	PPG	Points per game
TO	Turnovers per game	FG%	Field-goal percentage	3P%	3-point field-goal percentage	FT%	Free-throw percentage
**Bold**	Career best	°	League leader

=== College ===
Year	Team	GP	GS	MPG	FG%	3P%	FT%	RPG	APG	SPG	BPG	TO	PPG
2025–26	Maryland	31	26	27.0	42.0	29.9	85.7	2.9	2.2	1.1	0.1	1.6	11.0
**Career**		31	26	27.0	42.0	29.9	85.7	2.9	2.2	1.1	0.1	1.6	11.0
Statistics retrieved from Sports-Reference.
