= Murray State Racers women's basketball =

| 2025–26 Murray State Racers women's basketball team |
- University: Murray State University
- Head coach: Rechelle Turner (9th season)
- Location: Murray, Kentucky
- Arena: CFSB Center (capacity: 8,602)
- Conference: Missouri Valley
- Nickname: Racers
- Colors: Navy blue and gold

NCAA Division I tournament appearances
- 2008, 2025, 2026

Conference tournament champions
- 2008, 2025, 2026

Conference regular-season champions
- 2009, 2025, 2026

Uniforms
| Home | Away |

The Murray State Racers women's basketball program represents intercollegiate women's basketball representing Murray State University. The school competes in the Missouri Valley Conference in Division I of the National Collegiate Athletic Association (NCAA).

== History ==
Murray State began play in 1928. From 1932 to 1970, the women's team was discontinued; the Racers began play again in 1971. They have made the postseason eight times, three times in the NCAA Tournament (2008, 2025, and 2026), and five times in the WNIT (1989, 2007, 2009, 2022, and 2024). In their 2008 NCAA appearance, they lost 57–78 to Duke. As of the end of the 2024–2025 season, the Racers have an all-time record of 700–838.

== NCAA tournament results ==
| Year | Seed | Round | Opponent | Result |
|---|---|---|---|---|
| 2008 | #14 | First Round | #3 Duke | L 57–78 |
| 2025 | #11 | First Round | #6 Iowa | L 57–92 |
| 2026 | #12 | First Round | #5 Maryland | L 67–99 |
