= 2023–24 Iowa Hawkeyes women's basketball team =

American college basketball season

2023–24 Iowa Hawkeyes women's basketball

Big Ten tournament champions Gulf Coast Showcase champions

NCAA tournament, Runner-up
- Conference: Big Ten Conference

Ranking
- Coaches: No. 2
- AP: No. 2
- Record: 34–5 (15–3 Big Ten)
- Head coach: Lisa Bluder (24th season)
- Assistant coaches: Jan Jensen; Raina Harmon; Abby Stamp
- Captains: Caitlin Clark; Kate Martin; Gabbie Marshall
- Home arena: Carver–Hawkeye Arena

2023–24 Big Ten women's basketball standings
	Conf.				Overall
Team	W		L	PCT	W		L	PCT
No. 16 Ohio State	16	–	2	.889	26	–	6	.813
No. 2 Iowa †	15	–	3	.833	34	–	5	.872
No. 12 Indiana	15	–	3	.833	26	–	6	.813
Michigan State	12	–	6	.667	22	–	9	.710
Nebraska	11	–	7	.611	23	–	12	.657
Michigan	9	–	9	.500	20	–	14	.588
Penn State	9	–	9	.500	22	–	13	.629
Maryland	9	–	9	.500	19	–	14	.576
Illinois	8	–	10	.444	19	–	15	.559
Wisconsin	6	–	12	.333	15	–	17	.469
Minnesota	5	–	13	.278	20	–	16	.556
Purdue	5	–	13	.278	15	–	19	.441
Northwestern	4	–	14	.222	9	–	21	.300
Rutgers	2	–	16	.111	8	–	24	.250
† 2024 Big Ten tournament winner Rankings from AP Poll

The 2023–24 Iowa Hawkeyes women's basketball team represented the University of Iowa during the 2023–24 NCAA Division I women's basketball season. The Hawkeyes were led by head coach Lisa Bluder in her twenty-fourth and final season, and played their home games at Carver–Hawkeye Arena as a member of the Big Ten Conference.

After finishing second in the conference regular season standings, the Hawkeyes won the Big Ten tournament for the third consecutive season and received an automatic bid to the NCAA tournament. The Hawkeyes were named a No. 1 seed (Iowa's first since 1992) in the Albany 2 regional and were ranked as the tournament's 2nd overall seed. During the NCAA tournament they defeated Holy Cross, West Virginia, Colorado, LSU, and UConn to return to the title game for the second consecutive season. However, the Hawkeyes were defeated by top-ranked and undefeated South Carolina, 87–75, in the national championship game. Iowa finished the season with a record of 34–5 to set a program record and tie the Big Ten record for wins in a season.

Senior Caitlin Clark, who entered the season as the reigning National Player of the Year and a pre-season All-American, exceeded impossibly high expectations to leave an indelible mark on the University of Iowa and women's college basketball. Clark capped her career by being named both Big Ten Player of the Year and a unanimous First-team All-American for the third time, swept National Player of the Year awards for the second time, and finished with numerous NCAA records – highlighted by the NCAA career scoring record. Despite Clark's on-court accomplishments, she remained consistent that her legacy is more closely tied to broader impact – growing interest in the sport and inspiring the next generation. The final three games of Clark's career became the three most watched women's college basketball games of all-time. On April 10, at a celebration event at Carver–Hawkeye Arena, Iowa announced that Clark's jersey number 22 would be the third number to be retired in program history. Clark's jersey was retired at the Iowa–USC women's basketball game on February 2, 2025, a game in which the unranked Hawkeyes upset the number-four ranked Trojans 76–69.

The senior class, led by Clark, Kate Martin, and Gabbie Marshall, concluded their college careers having secured four NCAA tournament appearances, including three Sweet Sixteens and two Final Fours.

== Previous season ==
The Hawkeyes finished the 2022–23 season with a 31–7 record, including 15–3 in Big Ten play. They won the 2023 Big Ten women's basketball tournament and earned the conference's automatic bid to the 2023 NCAA Division I women's basketball tournament. They advanced to the championship game for the first time in program history, but they lost to LSU 102–85.

== Off-season ==
=== Departures ===
Name	#	Pos.	Height	Year	Hometown	Reason for departure
Shateah Wettering	13	F	6'0"	Sophomore (RS)	Montezuma, IA	Transferred to Northern Iowa
McKenna Warnock	14	F/G	6'1"	Senior	Madison, WI	Graduated; chose not to return (Note: Warnock had one more season of eligibility, but opted to attend dental school.)
Monika Czinano	25	F/C	6'3"	Senior (5th-year)	Watertown, MN	Completed college eligibility/ Declared for WNBA draft

=== Recruits ===
College recruiting
Name	Hometown	School	Height	Weight	Commit date
Ava Jones; W	Nickerson, KS	Nickerson	6 ft 2 in (1.88 m)	N/A	Jul 3, 2022
Ava Jones; W	Recruit ratings: ESPN: (93)				
Kennise Johnson; G	Joliet, IL	Example Academy	5 ft 4 in (1.63 m)	N/A	Jul 1, 2022
Kennise Johnson; G	Recruit ratings: No ratings found				
Overall recruit ranking:
Note: In many cases, Scout, Rivals, 247Sports, On3, and ESPN may conflict in their listings of height and weight.; In these cases, the average was taken. ESPN grades are on a 100-point scale.; Sources: "2023 Player Commits". ESPN. Archived from the original on July 8, 2023.

== Roster ==
2023–24 Iowa Hawkeyes women's basketball team
Players
Coaches

Pos.	#	Name	Height	Year	Previous school	Hometown
G	1	Molly Davis (injured)	5 ft 7 in (1.7 m)	GS	Herbert Henry Dow; Central Michigan	Midland, MI
G	2	Taylor McCabe	5 ft 9 in (1.75 m)	So	Fremont	Fremont, NE
G	3	Sydney Affolter	5 ft 11 in (1.8 m)	Jr	Marist	Chicago, IL
G	4	Kylie Feuerbach	6 ft 0 in (1.83 m)	RS Jr	Sycamore; Iowa State	Sycamore, IL
G	13	Kennise Johnson (injured)	5 ft 3 in (1.6 m)	Fr	Example Academy	Joliet, IL
G	20	Kate Martin (C)	6 ft 0 in (1.83 m)	GS	Edwardsville	Edwardsville, IL
G	22	Caitlin Clark (C)	6 ft 0 in (1.83 m)	Sr	Dowling Catholic	West Des Moines, IA
F	23	Jada Gyamfi	6 ft 1 in (1.85 m)	So	Johnston	Johnston, IA
G	24	Gabbie Marshall (C)	5 ft 9 in (1.75 m)	GS	Mount Notre Dame	Cincinnati, OH
F	34	AJ Ediger	6 ft 2 in (1.88 m)	Jr	Hamilton	Hudsonville, MI
F	35	Ava Jones (injured)	6 ft 2 in (1.88 m)	Fr	Nickerson	Nickerson, KS
C	40	Sharon Goodman	6 ft 3 in (1.91 m)	RS Jr	Crestwood	Lime Springs, IA
F/C	44	Addison O'Grady	6 ft 4 in (1.93 m)	Jr	Grandview	Aurora, CO
F	45	Hannah Stuelke	6 ft 2 in (1.88 m)	So	Washington	Cedar Rapids, IA

Head coach

- Lisa Bluder (Northern Iowa)

Assistant coach(es)

- Jan Jensen (Drake)
- Raina Harmon (Central Michigan)
- Abby Stamp (Iowa)

Legend

- (C) Team captain
- (S) Suspended
- (I) Ineligible
- (W) Walk-on
- Injured
- Current redshirt

Roster

== Schedule and results ==
Date time, TV	Rank^{#}	Opponent^{#}	Result	Record	High points	High rebounds	High assists	Site (attendance) city, state
Exhibition
October 15, 2023*; 2:00 p.m., BTN		DePaul; Crossover at Kinnick	W 94–72	—	34 – Clark	14 – O'Grady	10 – Clark	Kinnick Stadium (55,646); Iowa City, IA
October 22, 2023*; 2:00 p.m., B1G+	No. 3	Clarke	W 122–49	—	27 – Stuelke	10 – Stuelke	9 – Clark	Carver–Hawkeye Arena (14,998); Iowa City, IA
Regular season
November 6, 2023*; 6:30 p.m., B1G+	No. 3	Fairleigh Dickinson	W 102–46	1–0	28 – Clark	9 – Stuelke	10 – Clark	Carver–Hawkeye Arena (14,998); Iowa City, IA
November 9, 2023*; 7:00 p.m., ESPN2	No. 3	vs. No. 8 Virginia Tech; Ally Tipoff	W 80–76	2–0	44 – Clark	14 – Affolter	6 – Clark	Spectrum Center (15,196); Charlotte, NC
November 12, 2023*; 2:00 p.m., ESPN+	No. 3	at Northern Iowa	W 94–53	3–0	24 – Clark	10 – Clark	11 – Clark	McLeod Center (6,790); Cedar Falls, IA
November 16, 2023*; 7:30 p.m., FS1	No. 2	Kansas State	L 58–65	3–1	24 – Clark	11 – Stuelke	3 – Tied	Carver–Hawkeye Arena (14,998); Iowa City, IA
November 19, 2023*; 6:00 p.m., FS1	No. 2	Drake	W 113–90	4–1	35 – Clark	6 – Clark	10 – Clark	Carver–Hawkeye Arena (14,998); Iowa City, IA
November 24, 2023*; 6:30 p.m., FloHoops	No. 5	vs. Purdue Fort Wayne; Gulf Coast Showcase first round	W 98–59	5–1	29 – Clark	9 – Affolter	8 – Clark	Hertz Arena (3,313); Estero, FL
November 25, 2023*; 6:30 p.m., FloHoops	No. 5	vs. Florida Gulf Coast; Gulf Coast Showcase semifinals	W 100–62	6–1	21 – Clark	6 – Clark	6 – Tied	Hertz Arena (4,257); Estero, FL
November 26, 2023*; 6:30 p.m., FloHoops	No. 5	vs. No. 16 Kansas State; Gulf Coast Showcase championship	W 77–70	7–1	32 – Clark	10 – Martin	6 – Clark	Hertz Arena (3,007); Estero, FL
December 2, 2023*; 12:30 p.m., FS1	No. 4	Bowling Green	W 99–65	8–1	24 – Clark	11 – Goodman	11 – Clark	Carver–Hawkeye Arena (14,998); Iowa City, IA
December 6, 2023*; 6:00 p.m., ESPN2	No. 4	at Iowa State; Rivalry	W 67–58	9–1	35 – Clark	9 – Clark	5 – Clark	Hilton Coliseum (14,267); Ames, IA
December 10, 2023; 1:30 p.m., BTN	No. 4	at Wisconsin	W 87–65	10–1 (1–0)	28 – Clark	12 – Affolter	5 – Clark	Kohl Center (14,252); Madison, WI
December 16, 2023*; 6:00 p.m., BTN	No. 4	vs. Cleveland State; Hy-Vee Hawkeye Showcase	W 104–75	11–1	38 – Clark	13 – Stuelke	5 – Tied	Wells Fargo Arena (14,786); Des Moines, IA
December 21, 2023*; 5:00 p.m., B1G+	No. 4	Loyola Chicago	W 98–69	12–1	35 – Clark	17 – Clark	10 – Clark	Carver–Hawkeye Arena (14,998); Iowa City, IA
December 30, 2023; 1:00 p.m., BTN	No. 4	Minnesota	W 94–71	13–1 (2–0)	35 – Clark	8 – Stuelke	10 – Clark	Carver–Hawkeye Arena (14,998); Iowa City, IA
January 2, 2024; 8:00 p.m., Peacock	No. 4	Michigan State	W 76–73	14–1 (3–0)	40 – Clark	11 – Martin	5 – Clark	Carver–Hawkeye Arena (14,998); Iowa City, IA
January 5, 2024; 5:00 p.m., BTN	No. 4	at Rutgers	W 103–69	15–1 (4–0)	29 – Clark	10 – Tied	10 – Clark	Jersey Mike's Arena (8,000); Piscataway, NJ
January 10, 2024; 7:00 p.m., Peacock	No. 3	at Purdue	W 96–71	16–1 (5–0)	26 – Clark	10 – Clark	10 – Clark	Mackey Arena (14,876); West Lafayette, IN
January 13, 2024; 7:00 p.m., FOX	No. 3	No. 14 Indiana	W 84–57	17–1 (6–0)	30 – Clark	12 – Martin	11 – Clark	Carver–Hawkeye Arena (14,998); Iowa City, IA
January 16, 2024; 8:00 p.m., Peacock	No. 2	Wisconsin	W 96–50	18–1 (7–0)	32 – Clark	7 – Clark	5 – Clark	Carver–Hawkeye Arena (14,998); Iowa City, IA
January 21, 2024; 11:00 a.m., NBC	No. 2	at No. 18 Ohio State	L 92–100 ^{OT}	18–2 (7–1)	45 – Clark	7 – Tied	8 – Davis	Value City Arena (18,660); Columbus, OH
January 27, 2024; 1:00 p.m., BTN	No. 5	Nebraska	W 92–73	19–2 (8–1)	38 – Clark	10 – Clark	6 – Tied	Carver–Hawkeye Arena (14,998); Iowa City, IA
January 31, 2024; 7:00 p.m., Peacock	No. 3	at Northwestern	W 110–74	20–2 (9–1)	35 – Clark	9 – Stuelke	10 – Clark	Welsh–Ryan Arena (7,039); Evanston, IL
February 3, 2024; 7:00 p.m., FOX	No. 3	at Maryland	W 93–85	21–2 (10–1)	38 – Clark	10 – Martin	12 – Clark	Xfinity Center (17,950); College Park, MD
February 8, 2024; 8:00 p.m., BTN	No. 2	Penn State	W 111–93	22–2 (11–1)	47 – Stuelke	16 – Martin	15 – Clark	Carver–Hawkeye Arena (14,998); Iowa City, IA
February 11, 2024; 12:00 p.m., FOX	No. 2	at Nebraska	L 79–82	22–3 (11–2)	31 – Clark	8 – Clark	10 – Clark	Pinnacle Bank Arena (15,042); Lincoln, NE
February 15, 2024; 7:00 p.m., Peacock	No. 4	Michigan	W 106–89	23–3 (12–2)	49 – Clark	5 – Tied	13 – Clark	Carver–Hawkeye Arena (14,998); Iowa City, IA
February 22, 2024; 7:00 p.m., Peacock	No. 4	at No. 14 Indiana	L 69–86	23–4 (12–3)	24 – Clark	10 – Clark	9 – Clark	Simon Skjodt Assembly Hall (17,222); Bloomington, IN
February 25, 2024; 12:00 p.m., FS1	No. 4	Illinois	W 101–85	24–4 (13–3)	24 – Clark	15 – Clark	10 – Clark	Carver–Hawkeye Arena (14,998); Iowa City, IA
February 28, 2024; 8:00 p.m., Peacock	No. 6	at Minnesota	W 108–60	25–4 (14–3)	33 – Clark	10 – Clark	12 – Clark	Williams Arena (14,625); Minneapolis, MN
March 3, 2024; 12:00 p.m., FOX	No. 6	No. 2 Ohio State; College GameDay	W 93–83	26–4 (15–3)	35 – Clark	9 – Tied	9 – Clark	Carver–Hawkeye Arena (14,998); Iowa City, IA
Big Ten Women's Tournament
March 8, 2024; 5:30 p.m., BTN	(2) No. 3	vs. (7) Penn State; Quarterfinals	W 95–62	27–4	24 – Clark	10 – Clark	7 – Clark	Target Center (18,481); Minneapolis, MN
March 9, 2024; 4:30 p.m., BTN	(2) No. 3	vs. (6) Michigan; Semifinals	W 95–68	28–4	28 – Clark	7 – Affolter	15 – Clark	Target Center (18,746); Minneapolis, MN
March 10, 2024; 11:00 a.m., CBS	(2) No. 3	vs. (5) Nebraska; Championship	W 94–89 ^{OT}	29–4	34 – Clark	11 – Affolter	12 – Clark	Target Center (18,534); Minneapolis, MN
NCAA tournament
March 23, 2024*; 2:00 p.m., ABC	(1 A2) No. 2	(16 A2) Holy Cross; First round	W 91–65	30–4	27 – Clark	14 – Martin	10 – Clark	Carver–Hawkeye Arena (14,324); Iowa City, IA
March 25, 2024*; 7:00 p.m., ESPN	(1 A2) No. 2	(8 A2) West Virginia; Second round	W 64–54	31–4	32 – Clark	11 – Stuelke	3 – Clark	Carver–Hawkeye Arena (14,324); Iowa City, IA
March 30, 2024*; 2:30 p.m., ABC	(1 A2) No. 2	vs. (5 A2) No. 17 Colorado; Sweet Sixteen	W 89–68	32–4	29 – Clark	10 – Stuelke	15 – Clark	MVP Arena (13,878); Albany, NY
April 1, 2024*; 6:15 p.m., ESPN	(1 A2) No. 2	vs. (3 A2) No. 8 LSU; Elite Eight	W 94–87	33–4	41 – Clark	7 – Clark	12 – Clark	MVP Arena (13,888); Albany, NY
April 5, 2024*; 8:30 p.m., ESPN	(1 A2) No. 2	vs. (3 P3) No. 10 UConn; Final Four	W 71–69	34–4	23 – Stuelke	9 – Clark	7 – Clark	Rocket Mortgage FieldHouse (18,284); Cleveland, OH
April 7, 2024*; 2:00 p.m., ABC	(1 A2) No. 2	vs. (1 A1) No. 1 South Carolina; National Championship	L 75–87	34–5	30 – Clark	8 – Clark	5 – Clark	Rocket Mortgage FieldHouse (18,300); Cleveland, OH
*Non-conference game. ^{#}Rankings from AP Poll. (#) Tournament seedings in parentheses. A2=Albany 2. P3=Portland 3. A1=Albany 1. All times are in Central Time. Source:

== Rankings ==
Ranking movements Legend: ██ Increase in ranking ██ Decrease in ranking т = Tied with team above or below ( ) = First-place votes
	Week																				
Poll	Pre	1	2	3	4	5	6	7	8	9	10	11	12	13	14	15	16	17	18	19	Final
AP	3	2 (13)	5	4	4	4	4	4	4	3	2	5	3	2	4	4	6	3	2	2	2
Coaches	3	2 (9)	6	4	3	3	3	3	3	3	2	5т	4	2	4	4	6	3	2	2	2

== 2024 WNBA draft ==
Round	Pick	Player	WNBA club
1	1	Caitlin Clark	Indiana Fever
2	18	Kate Martin	Las Vegas Aces

== Ava Jones injury and medical retirement ==
Freshman Ava Jones was not cleared to play during the 2023–24 season. Two days after she committed to Iowa in 2022, and the day before she was set to start play in an AAU tournament in Louisville, Kentucky, she and her family were struck by an impaired driver while standing on a downtown sidewalk. Her father Trey Jones was killed, her mother Amy Jones suffered serious injuries, and Ava suffered a traumatic brain injury and severe damage to both knees. Ava ultimately took a medical disqualification and retired from basketball on June 7, 2024. In October 2024, the driver, Michael Hurley, was convicted of murder, driving under the influence, and multiple assault charges.
