= 2024–25 Iowa Hawkeyes women's basketball team =

American college basketball season

2024–25 Iowa Hawkeyes women's basketball

Cancún Challenge Riviera Division champions

NCAA tournament, Second round
- Conference: Big Ten Conference
- Record: 23–11 (10–8 Big Ten)
- Head coach: Jan Jensen (1st season)
- Assistant coaches: Randi Henderson; Raina Harmon; Abby Stamp
- Home arena: Carver–Hawkeye Arena

2024–25 Big Ten women's basketball standings
	Conf.				Overall
Team	W		L	PCT	W		L	PCT
No. 5 USC	17	–	1	.944	31	–	4	.886
No. 3 UCLA †	16	–	2	.889	34	–	3	.919
No. 19 Ohio State	13	–	5	.722	26	–	7	.788
No. 12 Maryland	13	–	5	.722	25	–	8	.758
No. 25 Michigan	11	–	7	.611	23	–	11	.676
Michigan State	11	–	7	.611	22	–	10	.688
Illinois	11	–	7	.611	22	–	10	.688
Oregon	10	–	8	.556	20	–	12	.625
Indiana	10	–	8	.556	20	–	13	.606
Nebraska	10	–	8	.556	21	–	12	.636
Iowa	10	–	8	.556	23	–	11	.676
Washington	9	–	9	.500	19	–	14	.576
Minnesota	8	–	10	.444	25	–	11	.694
Wisconsin	4	–	14	.222	13	–	17	.433
Rutgers	3	–	15	.167	13	–	20	.394
Purdue	3	–	15	.167	10	–	19	.345
Northwestern	2	–	16	.111	9	–	18	.333
Penn State	1	–	17	.056	10	–	19	.345
† 2025 Big Ten tournament winner As of April 7, 2025; Rankings from AP poll

The 2024–25 Iowa Hawkeyes women's basketball team represented the University of Iowa during the 2024–25 NCAA Division I women's basketball season. The Hawkeyes were led by head coach Jan Jensen in her first season, and played their home games at Carver–Hawkeye Arena as a member of the Big Ten Conference.

== Previous season ==
The Hawkeyes finished the 2023–24 season with a 34–5 record, including 15–3 in Big Ten play. They won the 2024 Big Ten women's basketball tournament and earned the conference's automatic bid to the 2023 NCAA Division I women's basketball tournament. They advanced to the championship game for the second time in program history and lost to South Carolina 87–75.

== Offseason ==
On May 13, 2024, head coach Lisa Bluder announced her retirement after 24 seasons. Longtime assistant coach Jan Jensen was promoted to head coach later that day.

The team experienced a major leadership transition marked by seamless continuity rather than a massive disruption.

Longtime associate head coach Jan Jensen was immediately promoted to head coach, bypassing a national search and preserving the culture, staff, and offensive/ defensive systems Bluder spent 24 seasons building.

The announcement caught some players and alumni completely by surprise, the core roster remained largely steady, and the team integrated key additions like transfer portal star Lucy Olsen and a top- 15 incoming recruiting class.

Bluder stepped away on her own terms to allow Jensen a natural pathway to lead, and Bluder transitioned into an active, supportive role as a fan in the stands rather than severing ties with the program.

=== Departures ===
Iowa departures
Name	Number	Pos.	Height	Year	Hometown	Reason for departure
Molly Davis	1	G	5'7"	Graduate student	Midland, MI	Graduated
Kate Martin	20	G	6'0"	Graduate student	Edwardsville, IL	Declared for WNBA draft
Caitlin Clark	22	G	6'0"	Senior	West Des Moines, IA	Declared for WNBA draft (Note: Clark, who graduated from Iowa in May 2024, had one remaining season of college eligibility.)
Gabbie Marshall	24	G	5'9"	Graduate student	Cincinnati, OH	Graduated
Ava Jones	35	F	6'2"	Freshman	Nickerson, KS	Medically retired

=== Incoming transfers ===
Iowa incoming transfers
Name	Pos.	Height	Year	Hometown	Previous school
Lucy Olsen	G	5'10"	Senior	Collegeville, PA	Villanova

=== 2024 Recruiting Class ===
Iowa incoming transfers
Name	Pos.	Height	Hometown	High School
Taylor Stremlow	G	5'10"	Verona, WI	Verona Area
Ava Heiden	C	6'4"	Sherwood, OR	Sherwood
Aaliyah Guyton	G	5'7"	Peoria, IL	Peoria
Callie Levin	G	5'9"	Solon, IA	Solon
Teagan Mallegni	G	6'1"	McFarland, WI	McFarland

== Roster ==
2024–25 Iowa Hawkeyes women's basketball team
Players
Coaches

Pos.	#	Name	Height	Year	Previous school	Hometown
G	1	Taylor Stremlow	5 ft 10 in (1.78 m)	Fr	Verona Area	Verona, WI
G	2	Taylor McCabe	5 ft 9 in (1.75 m)	Jr	Fremont	Fremont, NE
G	3	Sydney Affolter	5 ft 11 in (1.8 m)	Sr	Marist	Chicago, IL
G	4	Kylie Feuerbach	6 ft 0 in (1.83 m)	RS Sr	Sycamore; Iowa State	Sycamore, IL
C	5	Ava Heiden	6 ft 4 in (1.93 m)	Fr	Sherwood	Sherwood, OR
G	11	Aaliyah Guyton	5 ft 7 in (1.7 m)	Fr	Peoria	Peoria, IL
G	13	Kennise Johnson	5 ft 3 in (1.6 m)	So	Example Academy	Joliet, IL
F	23	Jada Gyamfi	6 ft 1 in (1.85 m)	Jr	Johnston	Johnston, IA
G	32	Callie Levin	5 ft 9 in (1.75 m)	Fr	Solon	Solon, IA
G	33	Lucy Olsen	5 ft 10 in (1.78 m)	Sr	Spring-Ford; Villanova	Collegeville, PA
F	34	AJ Ediger	6 ft 2 in (1.88 m)	Sr	Hamilton	Hudsonville, MI
F/C	44	Addison O'Grady	6 ft 4 in (1.93 m)	Sr	Grandview	Aurora, CO
F	45	Hannah Stuelke	6 ft 2 in (1.88 m)	Jr	Washington	Cedar Rapids, IA
G	55	Teagan Mallegni	6 ft 1 in (1.85 m)	Fr	McFarland	McFarland, WI

Head coach

- Jan Jensen (Drake)

Assistant coach(es)

- Randi Henderson (Iowa)
- Raina Harmon (Central Michigan)
- Abby Stamp (Iowa)

Legend

- (C) Team captain
- (S) Suspended
- (I) Ineligible
- (W) Walk-on
- Injured
- Current redshirt

Roster

== Schedule and results ==
Date time, TV	Rank^{#}	Opponent^{#}	Result	Record	High points	High rebounds	High assists	Site (attendance) city, state
Exhibition
October 30, 2024*; 6:30 pm		Missouri Western	W 110–55	–	18 – Tied	7 – Tied	6 – Olsen	Carver–Hawkeye Arena (14,998); Iowa City, IA
Regular season
November 6, 2024*; 6:30 p.m., B1G+		Northern Illinois	W 91–73	1–0	19 – Olsen	9 – Feuerbach	7 – Olsen	Carver–Hawkeye Arena (14,998); Iowa City, IA
November 10, 2024*; 4:30 p.m., ESPN2		vs. Virginia Tech; Ally Tipoff	W 71–52	2–0	20 – Olsen	7 – Stuelke	5 – Feuerbach	Spectrum Center (15,424); Charlotte, NC
November 13, 2024*; 6:00 p.m., BTN		Toledo	W 94–57	3–0	17 – Stuelke	9 – Stuelke	4 – Olsen	Carver–Hawkeye Arena (14,998); Iowa City, IA
November 17, 2024*; 2:00 p.m., ESPN+		at Drake	W 86–73	4–0	27 – O'Grady	10 – O'Grady	6 – Tied	Knapp Center (6,424); Des Moines, IA
November 20, 2024*; 6:00 p.m., BTN		vs. Kansas	W 71–58	5–0	16 – Tied	10 – Stuelke	6 – Olsen	Sanford Pentagon (3,347); Sioux Falls, SD
November 24, 2024*; 3:00 p.m., BTN		Washington State	W 72–43	6–0	17 – Olsen	8 – Tied	5 – Olsen	Carver–Hawkeye Arena (14,998); Iowa City, IA
November 28, 2024*; 5:30 p.m., FloHoops	No. 22	vs. Rhode Island; Cancún Challenge Riviera Division	W 69–62	7–0	18 – O'Grady	9 – Affolter	4 – Stremlow	Hard Rock Hotel Riviera Maya (514); Cancún, Mexico
November 29, 2024*; 8:00 p.m., FloHoops	No. 22	vs. BYU; Cancún Challenge Riviera Division	W 68–48	8–0	16 – Stuelke	10 – Affolter	4 – Affolter	Hard Rock Hotel Riviera Maya (500); Cancún, Mexico
December 7, 2024*; 6:00 p.m., FOX	No. 17	vs. Tennessee; Women's Champions Classic	L 68–78	8–1	23 – Olsen	11 – O'Grady	5 – Tied	Barclays Center (9,114); Brooklyn, NY
December 11, 2024*; 8:00 p.m., FS1	No. 21	No. 18 Iowa State; Rivalry/Iowa Corn Cy-Hawk Series	W 75–69	9–1	25 – Olsen	9 – Stuelke	5 – Olsen	Carver–Hawkeye Arena (14,998); Iowa City, IA
December 15, 2024; 11:00 a.m., BTN	No. 21	at No. 17 Michigan State	L 66–68	9–2 (0–1)	18 – Stuelke	8 – Stuelke	3 – Affolter	Breslin Center (5,939); East Lansing, MI
December 20, 2024*; 6:30 p.m., B1G+	No. 22	Northern Iowa	W 92–86	10–2	21 – Olsen	9 – Affolter	7 – Olsen	Carver–Hawkeye Arena (14,998); Iowa City, IA
December 29, 2024; 2:00 p.m., B1G+	No. 24	Purdue	W 84–63	11–2 (1–1)	12 – O'Grady	7 – Affolter	6 – Tied	Carver–Hawkeye Arena (14,998); Iowa City, IA
January 1, 2025; 11:00 a.m., B1G+	No. 23	at Penn State	W 80–68	12–2 (2–1)	17 – McCabe	10 – Stuelke	6 – Affolter	Bryce Jordan Center (3,417); College Township, PA
January 5, 2025; 5:00 p.m., BTN	No. 23	No. 8 Maryland	L 66–74	12–3 (2–2)	19 – Olsen	9 – Stuelke	3 – Stremlow	Carver–Hawkeye Arena (14,998); Iowa City, IA
January 9, 2025; 6:00 p.m., B1G+	No. 23	at Illinois	L 57–62	12–4 (2–3)	18 – Stuelke	13 – Stuelke	5 – Olsen	State Farm Center (4,231); Champaign, IL
January 12, 2025; 2:00 p.m., Peacock	No. 23	Indiana	L 67–74	12–5 (2–4)	15 – Mccabe	8 – Stremlow	4 – Tied	Carver–Hawkeye Arena (14,998); Iowa City, IA
January 16, 2025; 6:00 p.m., BTN		Nebraska	L 84–87 ^{OT}	12–6 (2–5)	16 – Stuelke	16 – Stuelke	7 – Olsen	Carver–Hawkeye Arena (14,998); Iowa City, IA
January 19, 2025; 4:00 p.m., B1G+		at Oregon	L 49–50	12–7 (2–6)	10 – Affolter	15 – Affolter	5 – Feuerbach	Matthew Knight Arena (7,307); Eugene, OR
January 22, 2025; 8:00 p.m., Peacock		at Washington	W 85–61	13–7 (3–6)	20 – Olsen	6 – Heiden	6 – Olsen	Alaska Airlines Arena (3,380); Seattle, WA
January 28, 2025; 7:00 p.m., BTN		Northwestern	W 85–80	14–7 (4–6)	26 – Stuelke	6 – Tied	6 – Olsen	Carver–Hawkeye Arena (14,998); Iowa City, IA
February 2, 2025; 12:30 p.m., FOX		No. 4 USC	W 76–69	15–7 (5–6)	28 – Olsen	9 – Affolter	4 – Tied	Carver–Hawkeye Arena (14,998); Iowa City, IA
February 6, 2025; 7:00 p.m., BTN		at Minnesota	W 68–60	16–7 (6–6)	17 – Stuelke	14 – Affolter	7 – Olsen	Williams Arena (6,721); Minneapolis, MN
February 10, 2025; 7:00 p.m., BTN		at Nebraska	W 81–66	17–7 (7–6)	32 – Olsen	10 – Stuelke	7 – Olsen	Pinnacle Bank Arena (6,535); Lincoln, NE
February 13, 2025; 6:30 p.m., B1G+		Rutgers	W 55–43	18–7 (8–6)	27 – Olsen	14 – Affolter	3 – Olsen	Carver–Hawkeye Arena (14,998); Iowa City, IA
February 17, 2025; 11:00 a.m., FOX		at No. 8 Ohio State	L 78–86 ^{OT}	18–8 (8–7)	27 – Olsen	15 – Affolter	7 – Olsen	Value City Arena (8,810); Columbus, OH
February 23, 2025; 1:00 p.m., Peacock		No. 3 UCLA	L 65–67	18–9 (8–8)	17 – Olsen	11 – Affolter	4 – Stremlow	Carver–Hawkeye Arena (14,998); Iowa City, IA
February 26, 2025; 6:00 p.m., B1G+		at Michigan	W 79–66	19–9 (9–8)	24 – Affolter	11 – Affolter	4 – Feuerbach	Crisler Center (4,082); Ann Arbor, MI
March 2, 2025; 3:00 p.m., Peacock		Wisconsin	W 81–66	20–9 (10–8)	22 – Olsen	15 – Stuelke	4 – Affolter	Carver–Hawkeye Arena (14,998); Iowa City, IA
Big Ten Women's Tournament
March 5, 2025; 5:00 p.m., Peacock	(11)	vs. (14) Wisconsin; First round	W 81–54	21–9	19 – Olsen	7 – Affolter	6 – Feuerbach	Gainbridge Fieldhouse; Indianapolis, IN
March 6, 2025; 8:00 p.m., BTN	(11)	vs. (6) No. 24 Michigan State; Second round	W 74–61	22–9	21 – Olsen	10 – Stuelke	9 – Olsen	Gainbridge Fieldhouse (7,028); Indianapolis, IN
March 7, 2025; 8:00 p.m., BTN	(11)	vs. (3) No. 13 Ohio State; Quarterfinals	L 59–60	22–10	14 – Tied	12 – Stuelke	7 – Olsen	Gainbridge Fieldhouse (7,500); Indianapolis, IN
NCAA tournament
March 22, 2025*; 11:00 a.m., ESPN	(6 S4)	vs. (11 S4) Murray State; First round	W 92–57	23–10	15 – Heiden	8 – Affolter	12 – Olsen	Lloyd Noble Center (8,006); Norman, OK
March 24, 2025*; 3:00 p.m., ESPN	(6 S4)	at (3 S4) No. 11 Oklahoma; Second round	L 62–96	23–11	20 – Olsen	9 – Affolter	5 – Affolter	Lloyd Noble Center; Norman, OK
*Non-conference game. ^{#}Rankings from AP Poll. (#) Tournament seedings in parentheses. S4=Spokane 4. All times are in Central Time. Source:

== Rankings ==
Ranking movements Legend: ██ Increase in ranking ██ Decrease in ranking — = Not ranked RV = Received votes
	Week																				
Poll	Pre	1	2	3	4	5	6	7	8	9	10	11	12	13	14	15	16	17	18	19	Final
AP	RV	RV	RV	22	17	21	22	24	23	23	RV	—	—	—	—	—	RV	RV	RV	RV	
Coaches	RV	RV	RV	24	20	24	22	22	22	23	RV	—	—	RV	—	—	—	—	RV	RV	
