= Grant Wolfram =

American baseball player (born 1996)

Baltimore Orioles – No. 48
- Pitcher
- Born: December 12, 1996 (age 29); Hamilton, Michigan, U.S.
- Bats: Left Throws: Left

MLB debut
- April 26, 2025, for the Baltimore Orioles

MLB statistics (through 2026 season)
- Win–loss record: 9–5
- Earned run average: 4.67
- Strikeouts: 92
- Stats at Baseball Reference

Teams
- Baltimore Orioles (2025–present)

Grant Austin Wolfram (born December 12, 1996) is an American professional baseball pitcher for the Baltimore Orioles of Major League Baseball (MLB).

== Amateur career ==
Wolfram attended Hamilton High School in Hamilton, Michigan, where he was a three sport standout in baseball, tennis, and basketball. Wolfram posted a 0.56 ERA with 99 strikeouts in 61 innings in his senior season of 2015. He was drafted by the Detroit Tigers in the 17th round of the 2015 MLB draft, but did not sign and instead attended Central Michigan University to play college baseball. In his freshman season with the Chippewas in 2016, he went 0–2 with a 6.66 ERA over 24 1/3 innings. Wolfram played for the Kalamazoo Growlers of the Northwoods League during the summer of 2016, going 2–4 with a 4.25 ERA and 38 strikeouts over 42 1/3 innings.

Wolfram transferred to Davenport University before his sophomore season. With the Panthers in 2017, he went 13–2 with a 3.28 ERA and 100 strikeouts over 93 1/3 innings. Wolfram played for the Wareham Gatemen of the Cape Cod League during the summer of 2017, going 0–3 with a 4.19 ERA over 19 1/3 innings. During his junior season at Davenport, he posted a 6–4 record with a 4.30 ERA and 95 strikeouts over 69 innings.

== Professional career ==
=== Texas Rangers ===
Wolfram was drafted by the Texas Rangers in the 18th round, with the 539th overall selection, of the 2018 Major League Baseball draft and signed with them.

Wolfram spent his professional debut season of 2018 with the AZL Rangers of the Rookie-level Arizona League, posting a 3.38 ERA with 10 strikeouts over 10 2/3 innings. He spent the 2019 season with the Hickory Crawdads of the Single-A South Atlantic League, going 5–3 with a 4.28 ERA and 73 strikeouts over 69 1/3 innings. He did not play in a game in 2020 due to the cancellation of the minor league season because of the COVID-19 pandemic.

Wolfram returned to Hickory for the 2021 season (which had moved classification to the High-A East level), posting a 2–3 record with a 4.21 ERA and 99 strikeouts over 66 1/3 innings. He spent the 2022 season with the Frisco RoughRiders of the Double-A Texas League, going 3–3 with a 4.42 ERA and 71 strikeouts over 57 innings. Following the 2022 season he played for the Surprise Saguaros of the Arizona Fall League, going 1–0 with a 1.86 ERA and 13 strikeouts over 9 2/3 innings. Wolfram split the 2023 season between Frisco and the Round Rock Express of the Triple-A Pacific Coast League, going a combined 10–1 with a 3.90 ERA and 78 strikeouts over 62 1/3innings.

Wolfram split the 2024 campaign between Frisco and Round Rock. In 46 appearances split between the two affiliates, he compiled a 4–1 record and 3.13 ERA with 69 strikeouts and 6 saves across 60 1/3 innings pitched. Wolfram elected free agency following the season on November 4, 2024.

=== Milwaukee Brewers ===
On December 11, 2024, Wolfram signed a major league contract with the Milwaukee Brewers. He was optioned to the Triple-A Nashville Sounds to begin the 2025 season. Wolfram was promoted to the major leagues for the first time on April 6, 2025. However, he did not appear for Milwaukee and was designated for assignment the next day, becoming a phantom ballplayer.

=== Baltimore Orioles ===
On April 7, 2025, Wolfram was traded to the Baltimore Orioles in exchange for Daz Cameron. On April 26, Wolfram was called up as the 27th man for a doubleheader against the Detroit Tigers. He made his MLB debut in the second game, throwing 1/3 innings, giving up one hit and one walk. The next day, he recorded his first career strikeout while allowing two runs to the Tigers. He was then sent down to Norfolk the next day. On June 17, Wolfram was called up, but did not appear in a game and was sent back down the next day. On July 10, Wolfram was called up for a doubleheader against the New York Mets, where he struck out four of the seven batters he faced, including Juan Soto and Pete Alonso, in game one, and was credited with his first career win.
