= Hamilton Community Schools =

School district in Michigan

Address
- 4815 136th Ave. Hamilton, Allegan, Michigan, 49419; United States

District information
- Grades: Pre-Kindergarten-12
- Superintendent: Dr. Bradford Lusk
- Schools: 7
- Budget: $41,933,000 2022-2023 expenditures
- NCES District ID: 2617400

Students and staff
- Students: 2,528 (2024-2025)
- Teachers: 152.53 (on an FTE basis) (2024-2025)
- Staff: 359.13 FTE (2024-2025)
- Student–teacher ratio: 16.57 (2024-2025)

Other information
- Website: www.hamiltonschools.us

Hamilton Community Schools is a public school district in Allegan County, Michigan. It serves Heath Township (which includes the unincorporated community of Hamilton), part of Holland, and parts of the townships of Fillmore, Laketown, Manlius, Monterey, Overisel, Salem, and Saugatuck.

== History ==
Hamilton High School opened in fall 2001. The former junior/senior high school, which had opened in 1961, became the district's middle school. Prior to 1961, the district's students attended Allegan High School, Holland High School, Saugatuck High School, and Zeeland High School.

== Schools ==
Schools in Hamilton Community Schools district
School	Address	Notes
Hamilton High School	4911 136th Ave., Hamilton	Grades 9-12
Hamilton Middle School	4845 136th Ave., Hamilton	Grades Grades 5-8
Bentheim Elementary	4057 38th St., Hamilton	Grades PreK-4
Blue Star Elementary	3846 58th St., Holland	Grades K-4
Hamilton Elementary	3472 Lincoln Rd., Hamilton	Grades PreK-4
Hamilton Virtual School		Grades PreK-12, online learning
Hawkeye Preschool	4317 46th St., Holland	Preschool
