= Kylie Feuerbach =

American basketball player (born 2001)

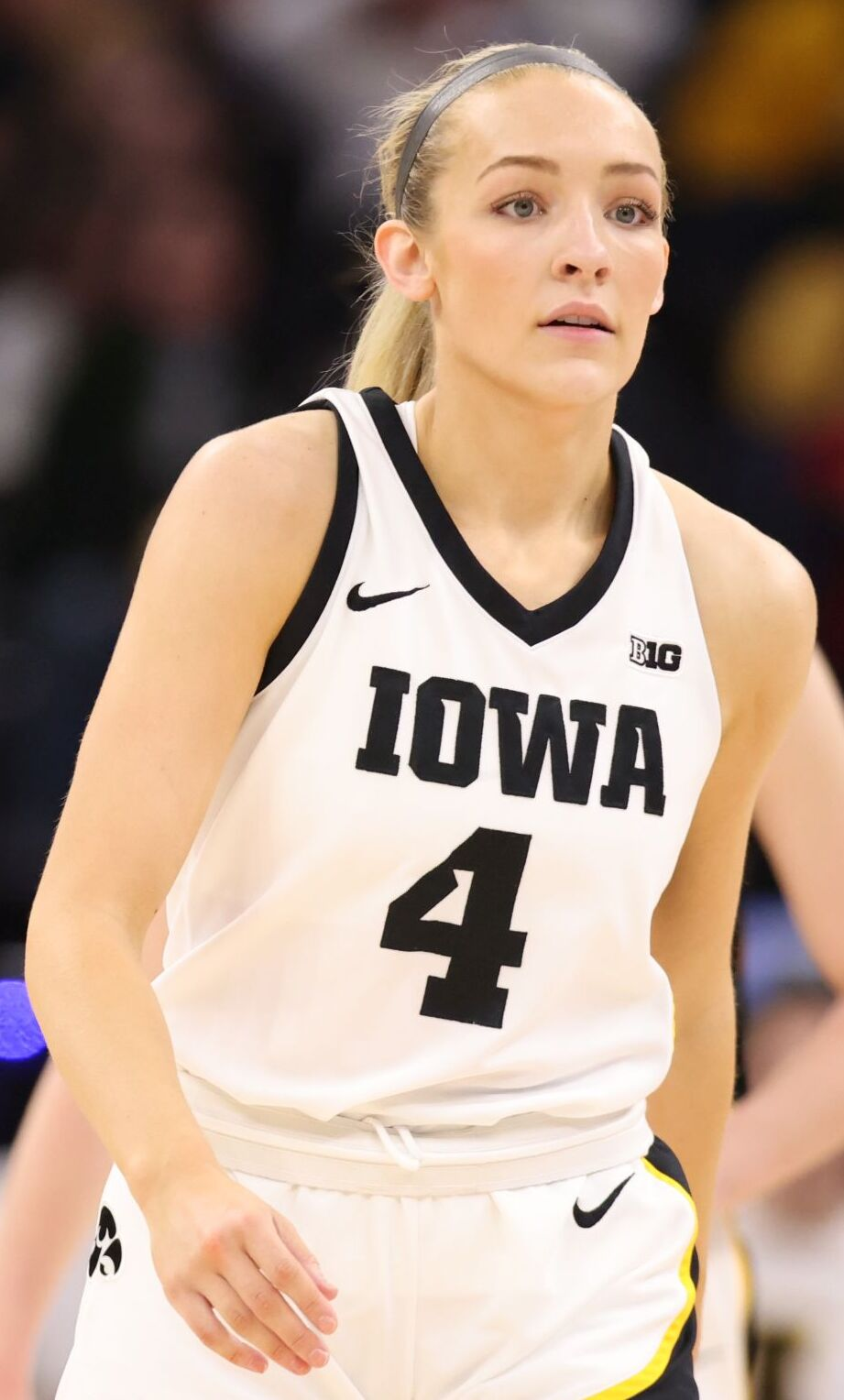
- Feuerbach with Iowa in 2024

Personal information
- Born: May 21, 2001 (age 25) Chicago, Illinois, U.S.
- Listed height: 6 ft 0 in (1.83 m)

Career information
- High school: Sycamore (Sycamore, Illinois)
- College: Iowa State (2020–2021); Iowa (2021–2026)
- Position: Guard
- Number: 4

Career highlights
- Big Ten All-Defensive Team (2026)

Kylie Jo Feuerbach (born May 21, 2001) was an American college basketball player for the Iowa Hawkeyes of the Big Ten Conference. She previously played for the Iowa State Cyclones.

== Early life and high school career ==
Feuerbach was born to Iowa State alumni Steve and Lisa Feuerbach and has four siblings. She lettered in four years of high school basketball at Sycamore High School in Sycamore, Illinois, where she averaged 19.9 points, 7.3 rebounds, 4.5 steals and 1.6 blocks per game. She played Amateur Athletic Union (AAU) basketball for The Truth and All Attack Iowa, where she played with future Iowa teammate Caitlin Clark, and hit a buzzer beater to win the Nike Elite Youth Basketball League (EYBL) title in 2018.

== College career ==
Feuerbach played one season for Iowa State University, where she averaged 5.5 points, 3.1 rebounds, and 21.9 minutes per game. She transferred to Iowa after that season, where she played off the bench and was the roommate of star guard Clark. She missed the 2022–23 season due to an ACL tear as the Hawkeyes reached the NCAA title game.

== Career statistics ==
Legend
GP	Games played	GS	Games started	MPG	Minutes per game	RPG	Rebounds per game
APG	Assists per game	SPG	Steals per game	BPG	Blocks per game	PPG	Points per game
TO	Turnovers per game	FG%	Field-goal percentage	3P%	3-point field-goal percentage	FT%	Free-throw percentage
**Bold**	Career best	°	League leader

=== College ===
Year	Team	GP	GS	MPG	FG%	3P%	FT%	RPG	APG	SPG	BPG	TO	PPG
2020–21	Iowa State	28	24	22.0	36.0	27.1	64.3	**3.1**	0.7	0.5	**0.4**	1.3	5.5
2021–22	Iowa	32	2	14.5	**42.4**	**30.6**	**86.2**	1.3	1.0	0.5	0.2	1.3	3.4
2022–23	Iowa	Did not play due to injury											
2023–24	Iowa	**39**	0	13.9	31.3	29.6	76.9	1.3	0.8	0.7	0.2	**0.7**	2.6
2024–25	Iowa	34	**34**	**25.4**	38.0	29.9	75.5	2.1	**2.3**	**1.3**	0.2	1.9	**6.7**
**Career**		133	60	18.7	36.9	29.3	75.8	1.9	1.2	0.8	0.2	1.3	4.4
Statistics retrieved from Sports-Reference.
