= Hamilton High School (Michigan) =

Public school in Michigan, United States

Location
- 4911 136th Ave., Hamilton, MI 49419; Hamilton, Michigan 49419; United States; 42.68540981198228°N 86.02693793124891°W

Information
- School type: Public
- Status: Open
- School district: Hamilton Community Schools
- Superintendent: Bradford Lusk
- Principal: Mitch Bosch
- Grades: 9–12
- Gender: Coed
- Colors: Gold & Black
- Athletics conference: Ottawa-Kent Conference
- Nickname: Hawkeyes
- Website: www.hamiltonschools.us/schools/hamilton-high/

Student assessments
- 2021–22 school year Change vs. prior year

M-STEP 11th grade proficiency rates (Science / Social Studies)
- Advanced %: 20.8 / 10.5
- Proficient %: 24.9 / 33.7
- PR. Proficient %: 15.6 / 45.9
- Not Proficient %: 38.7 / 9.9

Average test scores
- SAT Total: 997.7 (▼ −22)

Hamilton High School or HHS is a public high school in Hamilton, Michigan. Hamilton's school colors are gold and black. Their athletic nickname is "the Hawkeyes."

== History ==
The Play A Bad Day at Gopher's Breath was first performed at Hamilton High School on November 14, 1972 and was directed by Al Ver Schure.

== Curriculum ==
=== Hamilton Virtual School ===
Hamilton Community Schools also offers a virtual learning option, and graduates have the option of earning a Hamilton Virtual diploma or a Hamilton High School diploma. Under the virtual learning option, students can complete most course work online, but some in-person attendance (such as for orientation and standardized testing) is required.

== Extracurricular activities ==
- Theatre: The high school offers one play in the fall/winter and a musical in the winter/spring.
- Athletics: Sports offered include cross country, football, golf, soccer, swimming, tennis, volleyball, basketball, competitive cheer, wrestling, baseball, softball, tennis and track.

== Demographics ==
Demographic breakdown of students is 93% White, 5% Hispanic or Latino, 1% Asian, and 2% two or more races.

== Notable alumni ==
- Kevin Haverdink (1983), former NFL offensive lineman
- Grant Wolfram (2015), pitcher for the Baltimore Orioles
