= Nickerson, Kansas =

City in Reno County, Kansas

- City
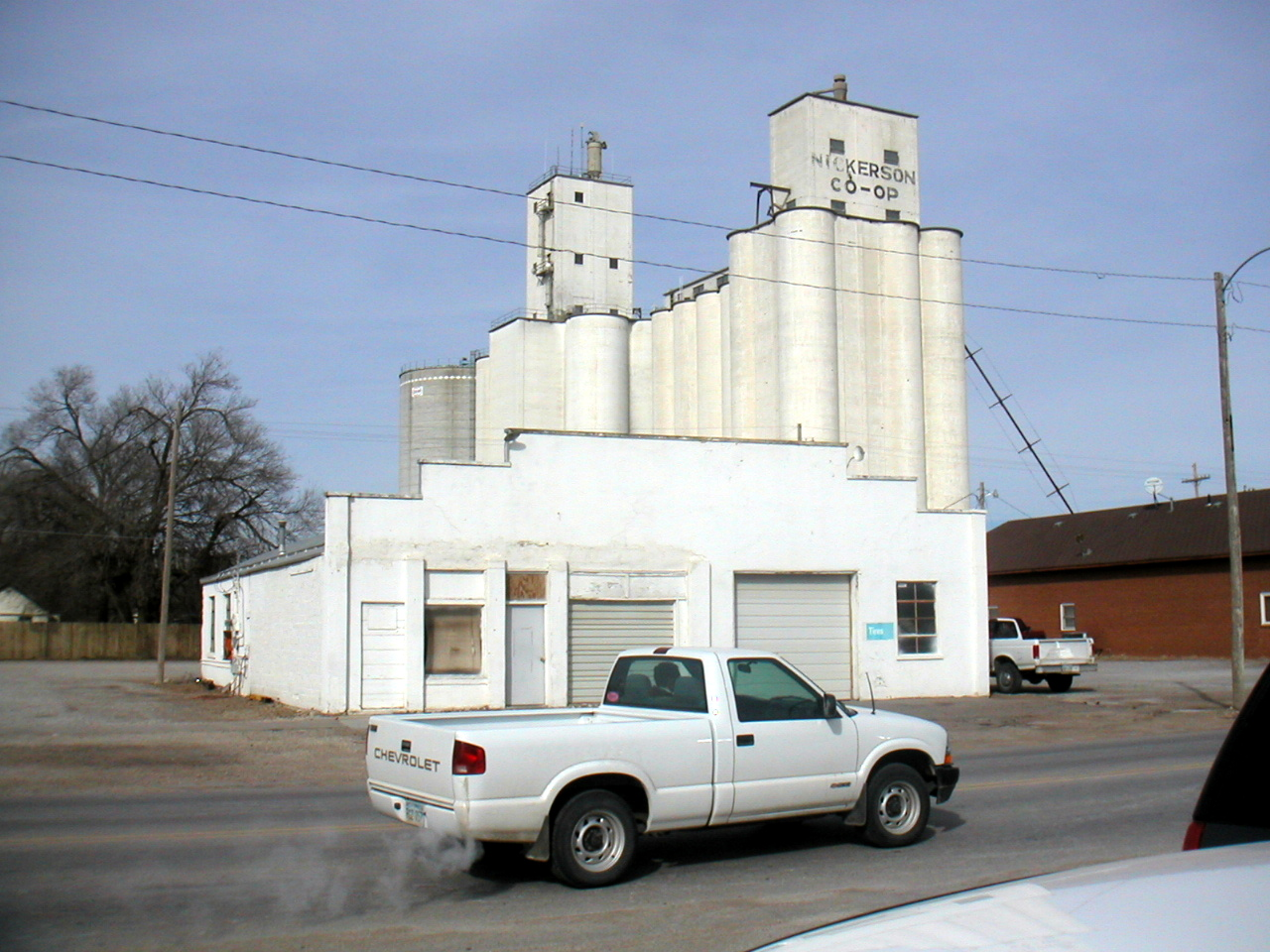
- Grain elevator (2003)

- Location within Reno County and Kansas

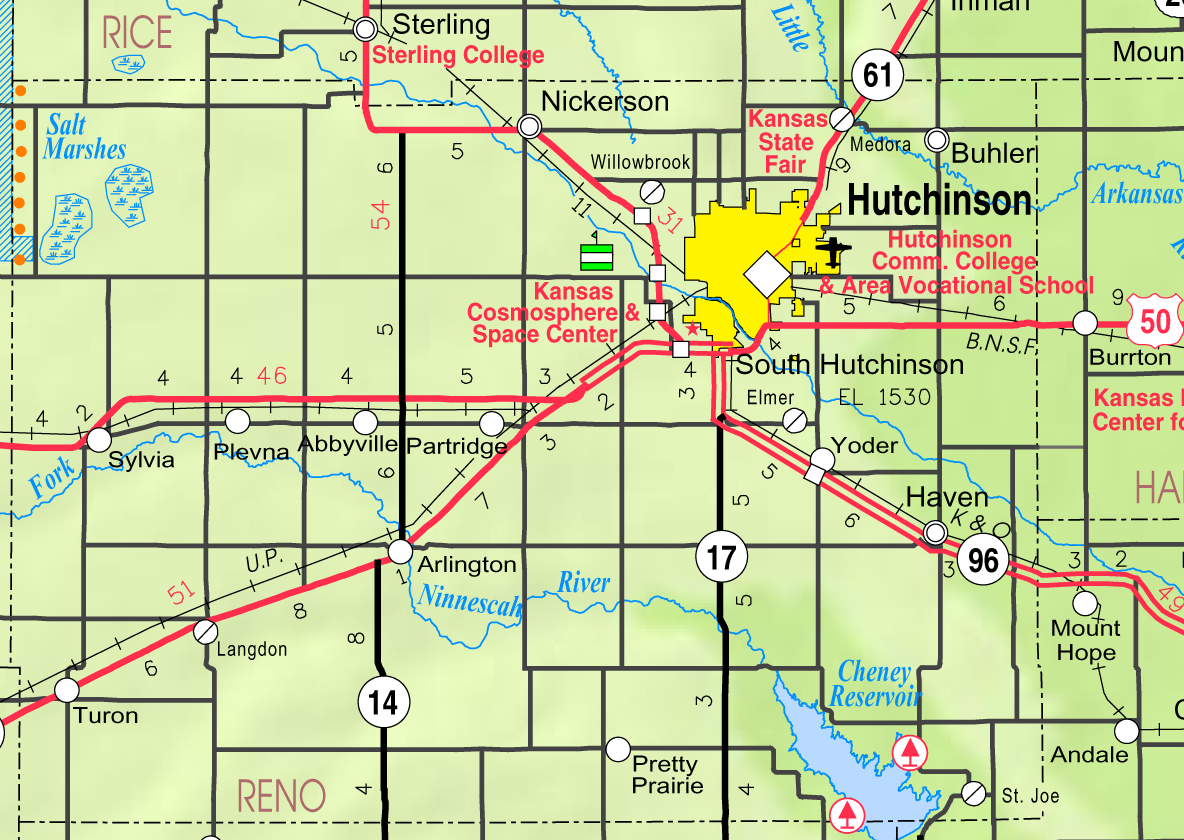
- KDOT map of Reno County (legend)
- Coordinates: 38°08′56″N 98°05′18″W
- Country: United States
- State: Kansas
- County: Reno
- Founded: 1870s
- Platted: 1872
- Incorporated: 1879
- Named for: Thomas Nickerson

Area
  - Total: 1.29 sq mi (3.35 km^{2})
  - Land: 1.29 sq mi (3.35 km^{2})
  - Water: 0 sq mi (0.00 km^{2})
- Elevation: 1,595 ft (486 m)

Population (2020)
  - Total: 1,058
  - Density: 818/sq mi (316/km^{2})
- Time zone: UTC-6 (CST)
  - Summer (DST): UTC-5 (CDT)
- ZIP Code: 67561
- Area code: 620
- FIPS code: 20-50525
- GNIS ID: 485630
- Website: nickersonks.org

Nickerson is a city in Reno County, Kansas, United States. As of the 2020 census, the population of the city was 1,058. It was named in honor of Thomas Nickerson, former president of Atchison, Topeka and Santa Fe Railway.

== History ==
Nickerson was laid out in 1872 when the Atchison, Topeka and Santa Fe Railway was extended to that point. The community was named for Thomas Nickerson, president of the railroad company at the time. The first houses were built at the site in 1875. Nickerson was incorporated as a city in June of 1879. In 1875, a schoolhouse was erected. The Nickerson Argosy newspaper was established in 1878 by Sargent & Brown. A wooden bridge was completed across the Arkansas River in 1879. The first set of city officials were: Mayor, Dr. L. A. Reeves; council, M. McCormick, C. S. Morse, J. O. Smith, H. R. Nickerson; police judge, O. O. Olmstead; treasurer, C. F. Heath; clerk, A. H. Jackson; marshal, J. D. Reed; justice of the peace, N. Bolte.

== Geography ==
According to the United States Census Bureau, the city has a total area of 1.35 square miles (3.50 km^{2}), all land.

=== Climate ===
The climate in this area is characterized by hot, humid summers and generally mild to cool winters. According to the Köppen Climate Classification system, Nickerson has a humid subtropical climate, abbreviated "Cfa" on climate maps.

== Films ==
- Picnic (1955), the scenes at the Owenses' and the Pottses' houses were filmed in Nickerson.

== Demographics ==
Historical population
Census	Pop.	Note	%±
1880	597		—
1890	1,662		178.4%
1900	1,038		−37.5%
1910	1,195		15.1%
1920	1,049		−12.2%
1930	1,052		0.3%
1940	1,052		0.0%
1950	1,013		−3.7%
1960	1,091		7.7%
1970	1,187		8.8%
1980	1,292		8.8%
1990	1,137		−12.0%
2000	1,194		5.0%
2010	1,070		−10.4%
2020	1,058		−1.1%
U.S. Decennial Census

=== 2020 census ===
The 2020 United States census counted 1,058 people, 399 households, and 278 families in Nickerson. The population density was 817.0 per square mile (315.4/km^{2}). There were 476 housing units at an average density of 367.6 per square mile (141.9/km^{2}). The racial makeup was 89.22% (944) white or European American (87.81% non-Hispanic white), 0.38% (4) black or African-American, 0.19% (2) Native American or Alaska Native, 0.28% (3) Asian, 0.38% (4) Pacific Islander or Native Hawaiian, 2.55% (27) from other races, and 6.99% (74) from two or more races. Hispanic or Latino of any race was 5.58% (59) of the population.

Of the 399 households, 34.8% had children under the age of 18; 49.9% were married couples living together; 23.1% had a female householder with no spouse or partner present. 24.3% of households consisted of individuals and 8.8% had someone living alone who was 65 years of age or older. The average household size was 2.4 and the average family size was 2.9. The percent of those with a bachelor's degree or higher was estimated to be 11.0% of the population.

29.4% of the population was under the age of 18, 6.4% from 18 to 24, 23.6% from 25 to 44, 23.4% from 45 to 64, and 17.1% who were 65 years of age or older. The median age was 37.9 years. For every 100 females, there were 100.8 males. For every 100 females ages 18 and older, there were 101.3 males.

The 2016–2020 5-year American Community Survey estimates show that the median household income was $53,224 (with a margin of error of +/- $5,923) and the median family income was $54,250 (+/- $5,809). Males had a median income of $39,375 (+/- $6,621) versus $27,930 (+/- $3,995) for females. The median income for those above 16 years old was $33,810 (+/- $5,277). Approximately, 6.3% of families and 7.4% of the population were below the poverty line, including 16.3% of those under the age of 18 and 1.9% of those ages 65 or over.

=== 2010 census ===
As of the census of 2010, there were 1,070 people, 422 households, and 318 families residing in the city. The population density was 792.6 inhabitants per square mile (306.0/km^{2}). There were 493 housing units at an average density of 365.2 per square mile (141.0/km^{2}). The racial makeup of the city was 98.7% White, 0.4% African American, 0.1% Native American, 0.1% from other races, and 0.7% from two or more races. Hispanic or Latino of any race were 2.1% of the population.

There were 422 households, of which 32.2% had children under the age of 18 living with them, 55.7% were married couples living together, 13.0% had a female householder with no husband present, 6.6% had a male householder with no wife present, and 24.6% were non-families. 21.8% of all households were made up of individuals, and 10.4% had someone living alone who was 65 years of age or older. The average household size was 2.54 and the average family size was 2.91.

The median age in the city was 38.8 years. 26.2% of residents were under the age of 18; 7.1% were between the ages of 18 and 24; 24.4% were from 25 to 44; 26.5% were from 45 to 64; and 15.7% were 65 years of age or older. The gender makeup of the city was 50.7% male and 49.3% female.

== Government ==
- City Hall, 15 N. Nickerson St.

== Education ==
The community is served by Nickerson–South Hutchinson USD 309 public school district. The district's schools include Nickerson High School and Nickerson Grade School.

== Infrastructure ==
=== Transportation ===
==== Highway ====
K-96 / K-14 state highway previously passed through Nickerson. In 2023, it was replaced by a new limited access freeway that was completed east of the cities of Nickerson and Sterling. Initially it was constructed as a super two freeway, but right-of-way has been secured to enable future expansion to four lanes.

==== Rail ====
The Kansas and Oklahoma Railroad passes through the city.

== Notable people ==
- Ava Jones, high school athlete, was involved in a highly publicized car accident. Jones has a basketball scholarship at University of Iowa.

== Gallery ==
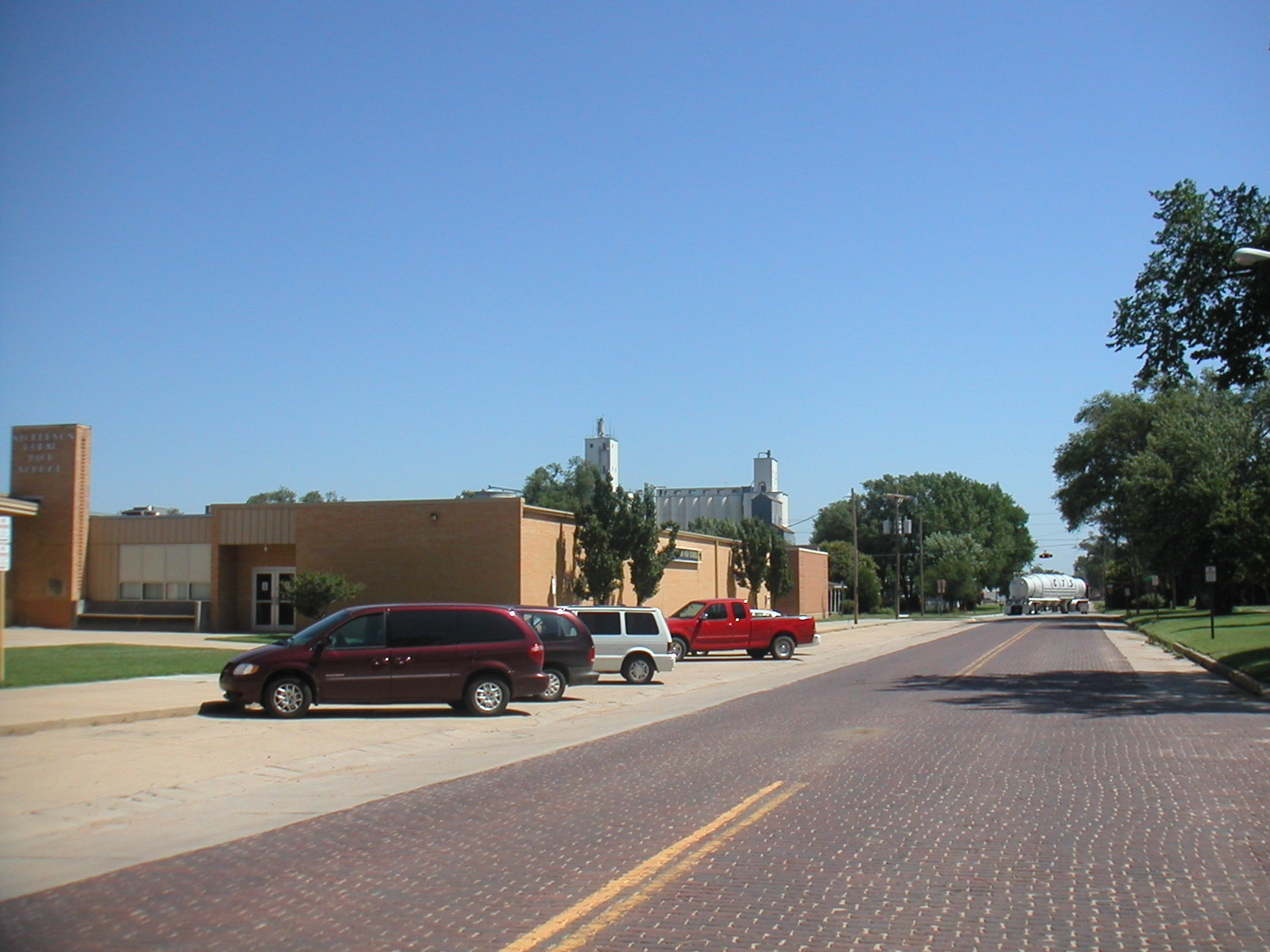
Nickerson High School 2005

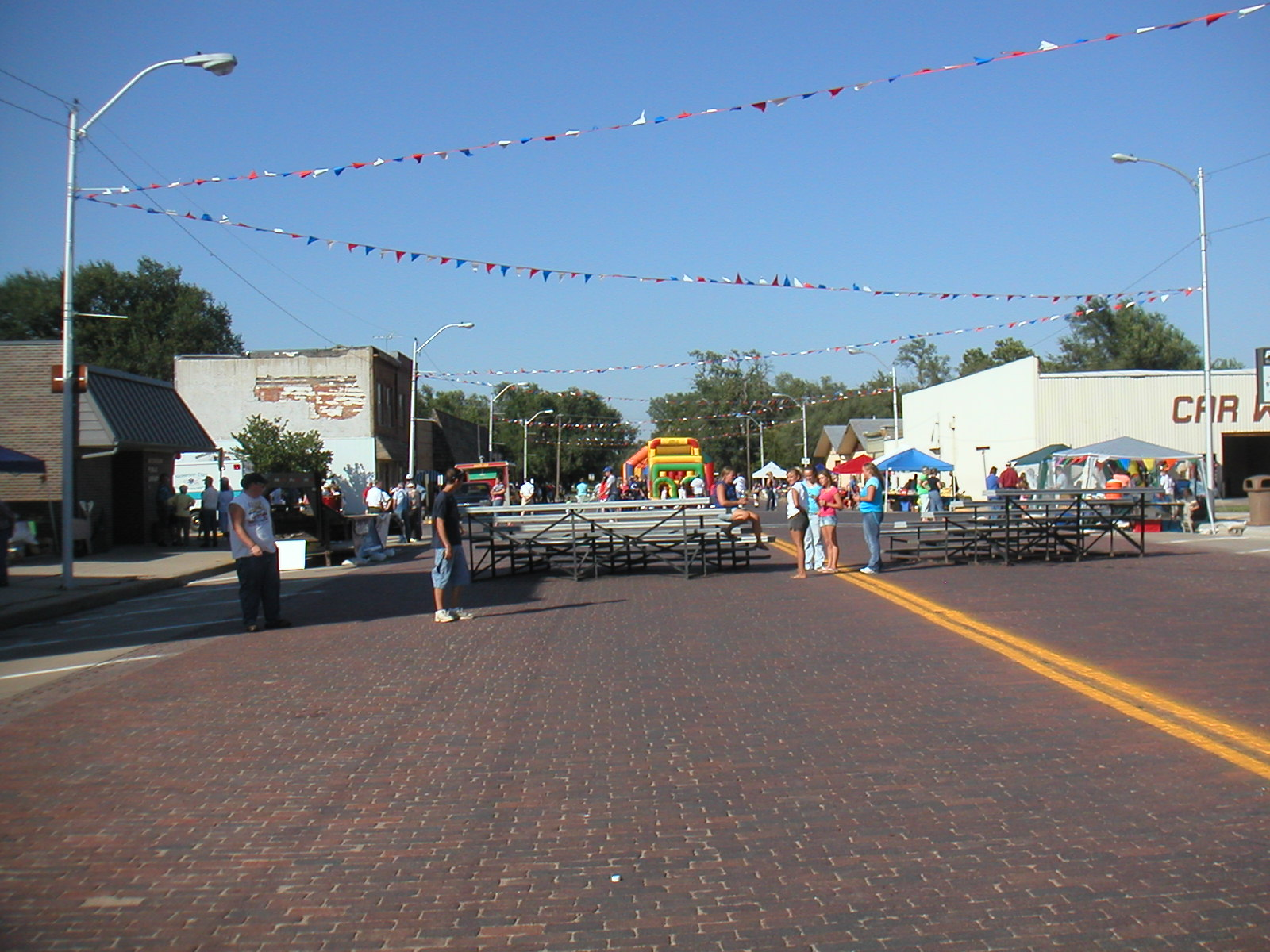
Nickerson Main Street

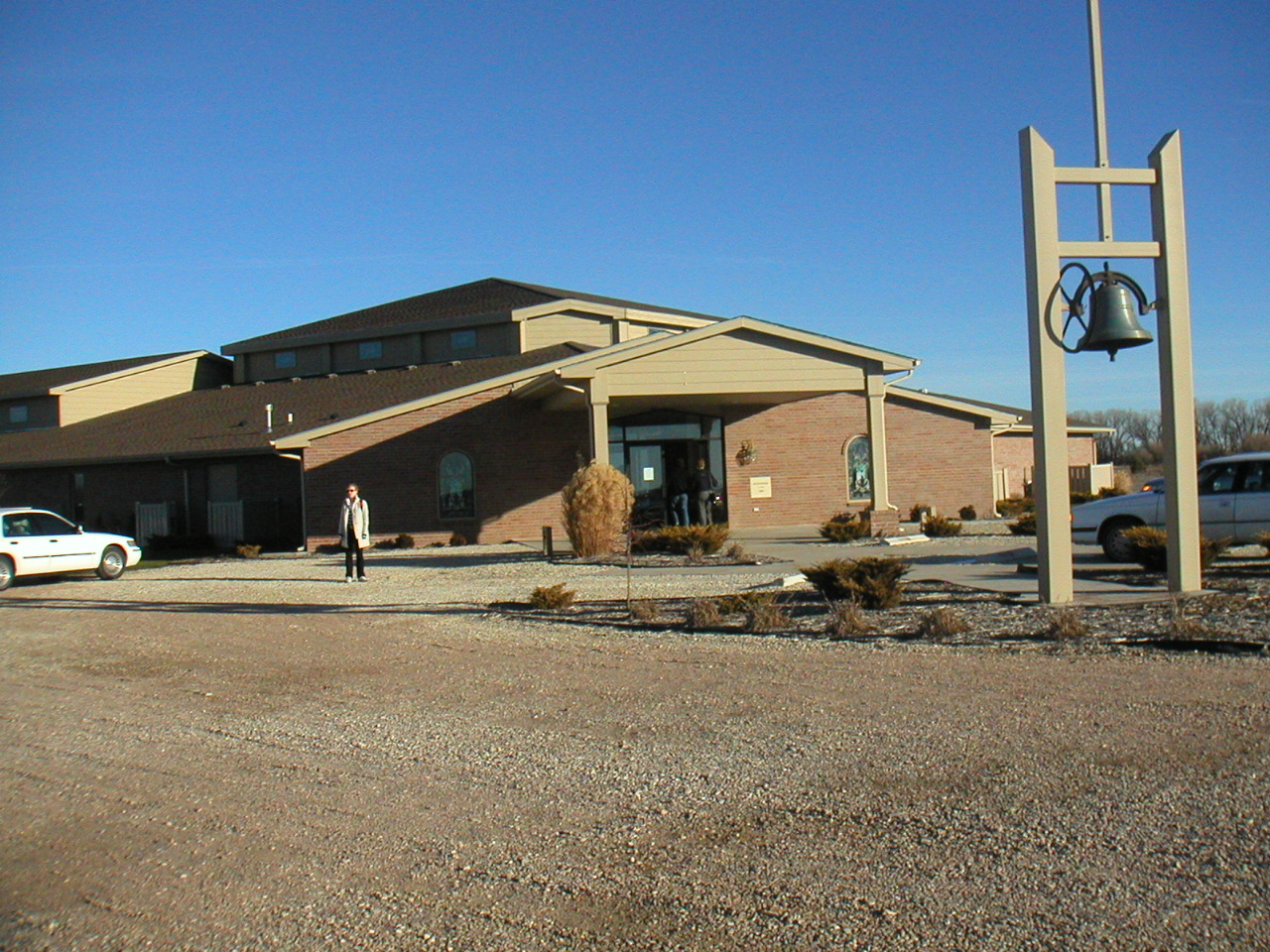
United Methodist Church

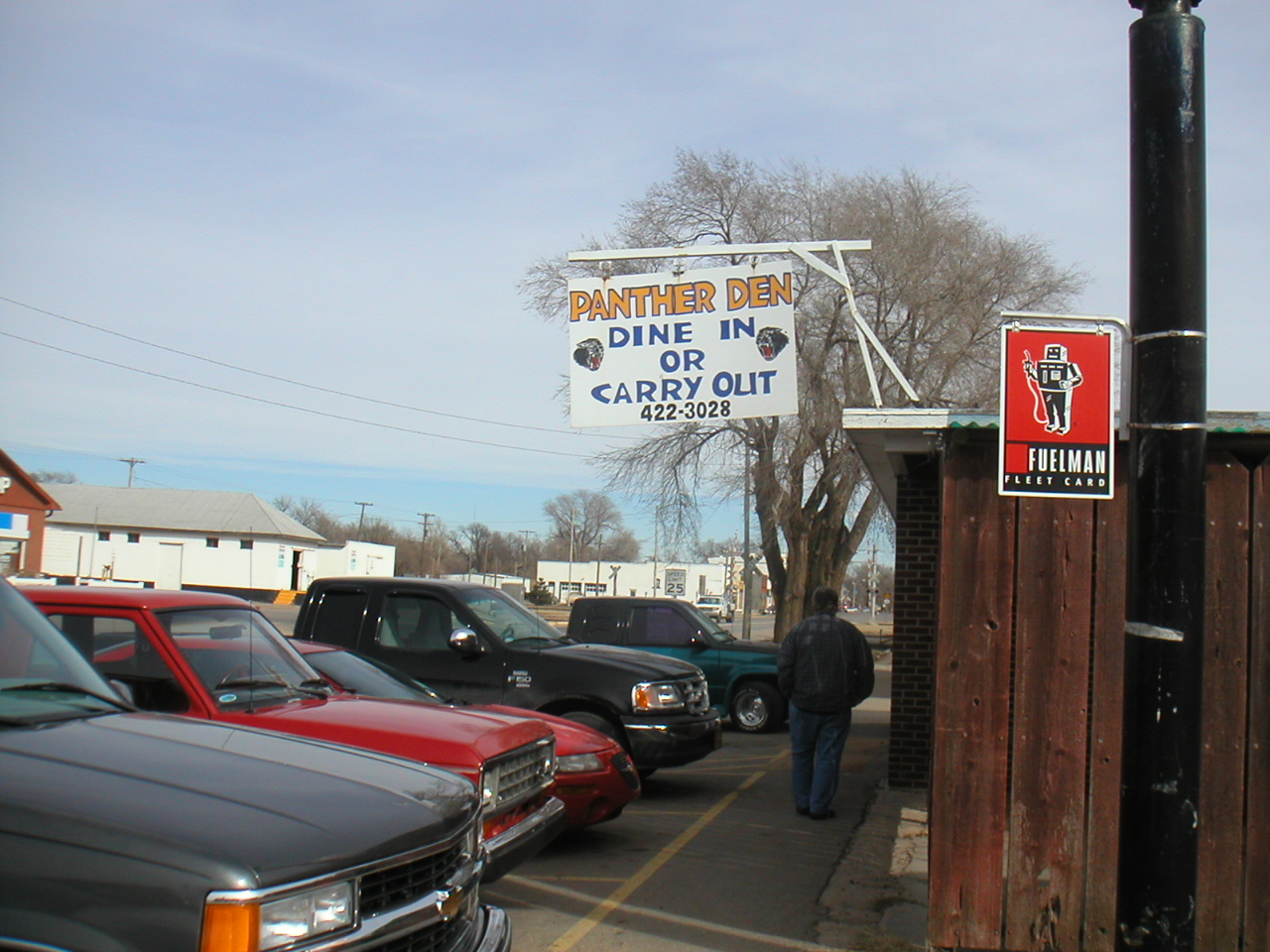
Panther Den
