= Ava Jones =

American basketball player

Personal information
- Born: March 7, 2005 (age 21) Nickerson, Kansas, U.S.
- Listed height: 6 ft 2 in (1.88 m)

Career information
- High school: Nickerson High School (Nickerson, Kansas)
- College: Iowa (2023–2024)
- Position: Forward
- Number: 35

Ava Jones (born March 7, 2005) is an American former basketball player from Nickerson, Kansas. She was a standout high school athlete who had committed to play for the University of Iowa. She became more widely known for surviving a serious and highly publicized accident in 2022, which resulted in injuries that ultimately ended her basketball career. In 2025, she was diagnosed with stage IV Hodgkin lymphoma.

== Early life and high school career ==
Jones attended Nickerson High School, where she competed in basketball, volleyball, and track and field. As a junior, she averaged 20.8 points and 15.4 rebounds per game and was named Class 3A Girls Player of the Year and Central Kansas League MVP.

In track and field, she won a state championship in the high jump by clearing 5 feet 4 inches, and also competed in the pole vault and javelin events.

== College recruitment ==
Jones initially committed to Arizona State University to play college basketball but reopened her recruitment following a coaching change. She committed to the University of Iowa on July 3, 2022.

== 2022 accident ==
On July 5, 2022, while attending an AAU tournament in Louisville, Kentucky, Jones and her family were struck by a vehicle driven by an impaired driver. Her father, Trey Jones, was killed, and both Ava and her mother, Amy, were seriously injured. Ava sustained a traumatic brain injury, a broken collarbone, and damage to both knees, requiring long-term rehabilitation. She and her mother were hospitalized for over a month in Louisville.

== Legal proceedings ==
The driver, Michael Hurley, was later convicted on multiple charges, including murder and assault. In 2024, he was sentenced to 70 years in prison.

== College enrollment and retirement ==
Jones enrolled at the University of Iowa, where she was awarded a medical scholarship. She majored in Journalism and Mass Communication with a minor in Lifestyle Medicine. In May 2024, she announced her medical retirement from basketball due to the lasting effects of her injuries.

== Cancer diagnosis ==
In early 2025, Jones publicly shared that she had been diagnosed with stage IV Hodgkin lymphoma. She reported experiencing symptoms for nearly two years, which were initially attributed to her prior brain injury. Her diagnosis was delayed as a result. Despite the late-stage cancer, she expressed determination to pursue treatment and continue her studies. In September 2025, Jones announced she was in remission after living with cancer for nearly 900 days.

== Advocacy ==
Jones gave the headlining speech at the Brain Injury Alliance of Iowa's annual event in March 2025, discussing her experience with brain injury and recovery. She threw the first pitch at the 10th annual Fight with Flash fundraiser baseball tournament in June 2025, honoring Austin "Flash" Shroeder, who died from non-Hodgkin lymphoma in 2015 at the age of 15. She has also shared updates about her journey on her Instagram account, including speaking at the 1st Annual Mothers Against Drunk Driving 5k in Iowa, presenting at the 2025 Nursing Oncology Convention at Kirkwood Community College, and attending the 2025 Lymphoma Fundraising Gala in NYC.
