= Heath Township, Michigan =

- Township
- Location within the state of Michigan
- Coordinates: 42°38′58″N 85°58′0″W
- Country: United States
- State: Michigan
- County: Allegan

Area
  - Total: 35.9 sq mi (93.0 km^{2})
  - Land: 35.4 sq mi (91.6 km^{2})
  - Water: 0.54 sq mi (1.4 km^{2})
- Elevation: 686 ft (209 m)

Population (2020)
  - Total: 3,937
  - Density: 111.3/sq mi (42.97/km^{2})
- Time zone: UTC-5 (Eastern (EST))
  - Summer (DST): UTC-4 (EDT)
- FIPS code: 26-37460
- GNIS feature ID: 1626459
- Website: www.heathtownship.net

Heath Township is a civil township of Allegan County in the U.S. state of Michigan. As of the 2020 census, the township population was 3,937.

== Communities ==
Dunningville is a historic locale in the southern part of the township at 42°36′46″N 85°56′55″W. Andrew Whistler built a sawmill here in 1855 that was operated by persons named Dunning and Hopkins. A station on the Chicago and West Michigan Railroad (later part of the Pere Marquette Railway) was named "Dunning", but the post office used the name Dunningville.

Gilchrist was a station on the Michigan Lake Shore Railroad located between Dunningville and Hamilton in 1873 and on successor railways.

Hamilton is an unincorporated community in the northwest corner of the township, where M-40 crosses the Rabbit River at 42°40′38″N 86°00′22″W. The first white settler was Charles Butler, who purchased the entirety of section 6 in 1835. It was at first known as Rabbit River, with a post office operating from May 1851 to September 1852. Aaron Willards platted a village named Rabbit River in 1862, with a second post office opening in July 1864. The post office was renamed "Hamilton" in May 1870. The ZIP code is 49419 and serves much of the township and surrounding areas.

Hamilton High School and Middle School are located in Hamilton.

== Geography ==
According to the United States Census Bureau, the township has a total area of 35.9 square miles (93.0 km^{2}), of which 35.4 square miles (91.6 km^{2}) is land and 0.54 square miles (1.4 km^{2}), or 1.51%, is water.

== Demographics ==
Historical population
Census	Pop.	Note	%±
1960	1,283		—
1970	1,450		13.0%
1980	1,962		35.3%
1990	2,297		17.1%
2000	3,100		35.0%
2010	3,317		7.0%
2020	3,937		18.7%
Source: Census Bureau. Census 1960- 2000, 2010.

As of the census of 2000, there were 3,100 people, 1,035 households, and 865 families residing in the township. The population density was 87.4 inhabitants per square mile (33.7/km^{2}). There were 1,084 housing units at an average density of 30.6 per square mile (11.8/km^{2}). The racial makeup of the township was 96.48% White, 0.32% African American, 0.16% Native American, 0.45% Asian, 0.03% Pacific Islander, 1.13% from other races, and 1.42% from two or more races. Hispanic or Latino of any race were 2.58% of the population.

There were 1,035 households, out of which 48.1% had children under the age of 18 living with them, 72.4% were married couples living together, 7.4% had a female householder with no husband present, and 16.4% were non-families. 13.9% of all households were made up of individuals, and 3.5% had someone living alone who was 65 years of age or older. The average household size was 2.99 and the average family size was 3.31.

In the township the population was spread out, with 32.8% under the age of 18, 8.0% from 18 to 24, 34.0% from 25 to 44, 19.9% from 45 to 64, and 5.4% who were 65 years of age or older. The median age was 32 years. For every 100 females, there were 104.6 males. For every 100 females age 18 and over, there were 104.3 males.

The median income for a household in the township was $54,545, and the median income for a family was $59,100. Males had a median income of $40,247 versus $26,864 for females. The per capita income for the township was $20,248. About 3.5% of families and 3.8% of the population were below the poverty line, including 4.6% of those under age 18 and 3.2% of those age 65 or over.

== Notable residents ==
- Grant Wolfram – professional MLB pitcher playing for the Baltimore Orioles
