= Indiana Hoosiers women's basketball statistical leaders =

The Indiana Hoosiers women's basketball statistical leaders are individual statistical leaders of the Indiana Hoosiers women's basketball program in various categories, including points, rebounds, assists, steals, and blocks. Within those areas, the lists identify single-game, single-season, and career leaders. The Hoosiers represent Indiana University Bloomington in the NCAA Division I Big Ten Conference.

Indiana began competing at a varsity level in 1971, as an independent in the Association of Intercollegiate Athletics for Women (AIAW), which was serving as the governing body for women's college sports at the time. Indiana joined the Big Ten Conference beginning with the 1982–83 season. The same year the Big Ten Conference began sponsoring women's basketball, the second year of the NCAA governing women's sports, and the first as the sole governing body, as the AIAW folded after the 1981–82 season.

The NCAA has recorded individual scoring and rebounding totals since it began sponsoring women's sports championships. However, it did not officially record the other statistics included in this page until later. Assists were first officially recorded in women's basketball in the 1985–86 season. Blocks and steals were first officially recorded in 1987–88. Nonetheless, Indiana's record books include players in these stats going back to the 1975–76 season, except for steals which it began tracking the following season. These lists are updated through the end of the 2024–25 season.

== Scoring ==
Career
Rank	Player	Points	Seasons
1	Mackenzie Holmes	2,530	2019–20 2020–21 2021–22 2022–23 2023–24
2	Tyra Buss	2,364	2014–15 2015–16 2016–17 2017–18
3	Denise Jackson	1,917	1980–81 1981–82 1982–83 1983–84
4	Karna Abram	1,910	1983–84 1984–85 1985–86 1986–87
5	Amanda Cahill	1,884	2014–15 2015–16 2016–17 2017–18
6	Jill Chapman	1,865	1998–99 1999–2000 2000–01 2001–02
7	Grace Berger	1,841	2018–19 2019–20 2020–21 2021–22 2022–23
8	Cindy Bumgarner	1,836	1984–85 1985–86 1986–87 1987–88
9	Rachelle Bostic	1,827	1980–81 1981–82 1982–83 1983–84
10	Cyndi Valentin	1,740	2002–03 2003–04 2004–05 2005–06

Season
Rank	Player	Points	Season
1	Tyra Buss	763	2017–18
2	Shay Ciezki	708	2025–26
3	Mackenzie Holmes	692	2022–23
4	Karna Abram	642	1984–85
5	Mackenzie Holmes	633	2023–24
6	Karna Abram	626	1986–87
7	Tyra Buss	620	2015–16
8	Tyra Buss	619	2016–17
9	Cyndi Valentin	609	2005–06
10	Denise Jackson	592	1982–83

Single game
Rank	Player	Points	Season	Opponent
1	Karna Abram	40	1986–87	Michigan State
2	Karna Abram	39	1984–85	Michigan
	Karna Abram	39	1986–87	Illinois
4	Rachelle Bostic	38	1983–84	South Carolina
	Tyra Buss	38	2016–17	North Carolina State
	Amanda Cahill	38	2017–18	Michigan State
	Shay Ciezki	38	2025–26	Iowa State
8	Cindy Kerns	37	1998–99	Michigan
	Larryn Brooks	37	2013–14	Virginia Tech
	Tyra Buss	37	2017–18	Nebraska
	Shay Ciezki	37	2025–26	Purdue

== Rebounds ==
Career
Rank	Player	Rebounds	Seasons
1	Denise Jackson	1,273	1980–81 1981–82 1982–83 1983–84
2	Amanda Cahill	1,115	2014–15 2015–16 2016–17 2017–18
3	Whitney Thomas	1,090	2005–06 2006–07 2007–08 2008–09
4	Mackenzie Holmes	990	2019–20 2020–21 2021–22 2022–23 2023–24
5	Jill Chapman	970	1998–99 1999–2000 2000–01 2001–02
6	Shirley Bryant	924	1991–92 1992–93 1993–94 1994–95
7	Rachelle Bostic	873	1980–81 1981–82 1982–83 1983–84
8	Angela Hawkins	803	2002–03 2003–04 2004–05 2005–06
9	Zan Jefferies	769	1987–88 1988–89 1989–90 1990–91
10	Jenny DeMuth	763	2001–02 2002–03 2003–04 2005–06

Season
Rank	Player	Rebounds	Season
1	Denise Jackson	366	1982–83
2	Denise Jackson	348	1981–82
3	Amanda Cahill	302	2016–17
4	Amanda Cahill	295	2017–18
5	Whitney Thomas	286	2007–08
6	Denise Jackson	285	1983–84
7	Jill Chapman	282	2001–02
8	Whitney Thomas	280	2006–07
9	Amanda Cahill	279	2015–16
10	Denise Jackson	274	1980–81

Single game
Rank	Player	Rebounds	Season	Opponent
1	Denise Jackson	22	1980–81	Purdue
	Shirley Bryant	22	1994–95	Michigan
3	Denise Jackson	21	1982–83	Northwestern
	Denise Jackson	21	1982–83	Michigan
	Denise Jackson	21	1983–84	Pittsburgh
	Jill Chapman	21	1998–99	Ball State
7	Denise Jackson	20	1982–83	Iowa
	Denise Jackson	20	1982–83	C. Missouri State
	Alexis Gassion	20	2016–17	Oakland
10	Denise Jackson	19	1980–81	Minnesota
	Denise Jackson	19	1983–84	Purdue
	Whitney Thomas	19	2007–08	Cincinnati

== Assists ==
Career
Rank	Player	Assists	Seasons
1	Tyra Buss	574	2014–15 2015–16 2016–17 2017–18
2	Grace Berger	573	2018–19 2019–20 2020–21 2021–22 2022–23
3	Tisha Hill	533	1988–89 1989–90 1990–91 1991–92
4	Ali Patberg	528	2018–19 2019–20 2020–21 2021–22
5	Chloe Moore-McNeil	510	2020–21 2021–22 2022–23 2023–24 2024–25
6	Heather Cassady	411	1998–99 1999–2000 2000–01 2001–02
7	Dani Thrush	400	1995–96 1996–97 1997–98 1998–99
8	Jamie Braun	378	2006–07 2007–08 2008–09 2009–10
9	Linda Cunningham	374	1982–83 1983–84 1984–85 1985–86
10	Emma Urzua	366	1992–93 1993–94 1994–95

Season
Rank	Player	Assists	Season
1	Lori Burroughs	206	1979–80
2	Tisha Hill	182	1990–91
3	Tyra Buss	174	2017–18
4	Ali Patberg	168	2019–20
5	Chloe Moore-McNeil	160	2023–24
6	Tyra Buss	158	2016–17
7	Chloe Moore-McNeil	155	2022–23
8	Larryn Brooks	154	2013–14
9	Tracy Krick	150	1984–85
10	Julie Johnson	149	1980–81
	Ali Patberg	149	2018–19

Single game
Rank	Player	Assists	Season	Opponent
1	Tracy Krick	15	1984–85	Purdue
2	Tisha Hill	13	1990–91	Kentucky
	Ali Patberg	13	2018–19	Missouri State
4	Lori Burroughs	12	1979–80	Stanford
	Kim Land	12	1980–81	Michigan State
	Amy Metheny	12	1980–81	Illinois
	Tracy Krick	12	1984–85	Stanford
	Tracy Krick	12	1984–85	Iowa
	Tracy Krick	12	1984–85	Northwestern
	Dani Thrush	12	1998–99	Iowa
	Kristen Bodine	12	2001–02	Ball State
	Grace Berger	12	2020–21	Penn State

== Steals ==
Career
Rank	Player	Steals	Seasons
1	Tyra Buss	293	2014–15 2015–16 2016–17 2017–18
2	Kim Roberson	259	2005–06 2006–07 2007–08 2008–09
3	Whitney Thomas	237	2005–06 2006–07 2007–08 2008–09
4	Jenny DeMuth	230	2001–02 2002–03 2003–04 2005–06
5	Jamie Braun	223	2006–07 2007–08 2008–09 2009–10
6	Tisha Hill	210	1988–89 1989–90 1990–91 1991–92
7	Lori Burroughs	195	1978–79 1979–80 1980–81
8	Amanda Cahill	189	2014–15 2015–16 2016–17 2017–18
9	Kris McGrade	181	1990–91 1991–92 1992–93 1993–94
10	Dani Thrush	176	1995–96 1996–97 1997–98 1998–99

Season
Rank	Player	Steals	Season
1	Lori Burroughs	96	1978–79
2	Lori Burroughs	90	1979–80
3	Kim Roberson	86	2006–07
4	Tyra Buss	81	2016–17
5	Pam Fritz	77	1988–89
	Tyra Buss	77	2017–18
7	Kim Roberson	76	2007–08
8	Whitney Thomas	74	2007–08
9	Jenny DeMuth	72	2003–04
	Nicole Cardaño-Hillary	72	2021–22

Single game
Rank	Player	Steals	Season	Opponent
1	Deb McClurg	9	1981–82	Northwestern
	Amy Cherubini	9	1990–91	UIC
	Kim Roberson	9	2007–08	Wake Forest
4	Ann Mooney	8	1987–88	Indiana State
	Heather Cassady	8	1999–2000	Illinois
	Tyra Buss	8	2014–15	Valparaiso
	Tyra Buss	8	2016–17	UMass Lowell
	Nicole Cardaño-Hillary	8	2021–22	Michigan
9	Zan Jefferies	7	1989–90	Ohio State
	Jaime Garner	7	1993–94	Evansville
	Shirley Bryant	7	1993–94	Eastern Illinois
	Jenny DeMuth	7	2003–04	Iowa
	Whitney Thomas	7	2007–08	Wichita State
	Tyra Buss	7	2014–15	Gardner-Webb
	Tyra Buss	7	2015–16	Nebraska
	Tyra Buss	7	2017–18	Milwaukee

== Blocks ==
Career
Rank	Player	Blocks	Seasons
1	Quacy Barnes	269	1994–95 1995–96 1996–97 1997–98
2	Mackenzie Holmes	258	2019–20 2020–21 2021–22 2022–23 2023–24
3	Jill Chapman	197	1998–99 1999–2000 2000–01 2001–02
4	Sarah McKay	145	2003–04 2004–05 2005–06 2006–07
5	Denise Jackson	135	1980–81 1981–82 1982–83 1983–84
	Amanda Cahill	135	2014–15 2015–16 2016–17 2017–18
7	Angela Hawkins	127	2002–03 2003–04 2004–05 2005–06
8	Sue Hodges	126	1977–78 1978–79 1979–80 1980–81
9	Aleksa Gulbe	112	2018–19 2019–20 2020–21 2021–22
10	Shirley Bryant	93	1991–92 1992–93 1993–94 1994–95

Season
Rank	Player	Blocks	Season
1	Quacy Barnes	95	1996–97
2	Mackenzie Holmes	80	2020–21
3	Quacy Barnes	77	1995–96
4	Jill Chapman	69	2001–02
5	Quacy Barnes	60	1997–98
6	Sarah McKay	59	2006–07
7	Mackenzie Holmes	58	2022–23
8	Sarah McKay	55	2003–04
9	Sue Hodges	54	1980–81
10	Amanda Cahill	52	2017–18

Single game
Rank	Player	Blocks	Season	Opponent
1	Quacy Barnes	10	1996–97	Youngstown State
2	Quacy Barnes	7	1996–97	Illinois
	Quacy Barnes	7	1996–97	Michigan State
	Sarah McKay	7	2003–04	Michigan State
	Amanda Cahill	7	2017–18	Nebraska
	Mackenzie Holmes	7	2020–21	Eastern Kentucky
7	Jill Chapman	6	2001–02	Penn State
	Sarah McKay	6	2003–04	Illinois
	Sarah McKay	6	2006–07	Wisconsin
	Quaneisha McCurty	6	2011–12	Colorado State
	Quaneisha McCurty	6	2012–13	Clemson
