= Indiana basketball =

Indiana basketball may refer to:

- Indiana Fever, a professional women's basketball team that plays in the Women's National Basketball Association
- Indiana Hoosiers men's basketball, the men's basketball team of Indiana University Bloomington
- Indiana Hoosiers women's basketball, the women's basketball team of Indiana University Bloomington
- Indiana Pacers, a professional men's basketball team that plays in the National Basketball Association
