= List of Indiana Hoosiers women's basketball seasons =

Indiana Women's College Basketball seasons

Season	Coach	Overall	Conference	Standing	Postseason
Bea Gorton (Independent) (1971–1976)
1971–1972	Bea Gorton	17–2			AIAW Quarter Finals
1972–1973	Bea Gorton	16–3			AIAW 4th
1973–1974	Bea Gorton	15–5			AIAW Quarter Finals
1974–1975	Bea Gorton	17–5			
1975–1976	Bea Gorton	11–13			
Joy Malchodi (Independent) (1976–1980)
1976–1977	Joy Malchodi	14–12			
1977–1978	Joy Malchodi	7–16			
1978–1979	Joy Malchodi	21–14			
1979–1980	Joy Malchodi	18–14			
Maryalyce Jeremiah (Independent) (1980–1982)
1980–1981	Maryalyce Jeremiah	21–16			
1981–1982	Maryalyce Jeremiah	17–13			
Maryalyce Jeremiah (Big Ten Conference) (1982–1985)
1982–1983	Maryalyce Jeremiah	19–11	15–3	1st	NCAA Second Round
1983–1984	Maryalyce Jeremiah	17–11	11–7	3rd	
1984–1985	Maryalyce Jeremiah	16–12	11–7	4th	
Jorja Hoehn (Big Ten Conference) (1985–1988)
1985–1986	Jorja Hoehn	17–11	10–8	4th	
1986–1987	Jorja Hoehn	10–17	5–13	7th	
1987–1988	Jorja Hoehn	12–16	7–11	6th	
Jim Izard (Big Ten Conference) (1988–2000)
1988–1989	Jim Izard	16–12	9–9	4th	
1989–1990	Jim Izard	12–16	6–12	7th	
1990–1991	Jim Izard	18–13	8–10	5th	
1991–1992	Jim Izard	16–12	8–10	6th	
1992–1993	Jim Izard	14–13	5–13	9th	
1993–1994	Jim Izard	19–9	10–8	4th	NCAA First Round
1994–1995	Jim Izard	19–10	8–8	5th	NCAA First Round
1995–1996	Jim Izard	14–13	5–11	9th	
1996–1997	Jim Izard	16–13	7–9	8th	
1997–1998	Jim Izard	21–12	10–6	3rd	
1998–1999	Jim Izard	13–18	2–14	10th	
1999–2000	Jim Izard	10–18	5–11	8th	
Kathi Bennet (Big Ten Conference) (2000–2005)
2000–2001	Kathi Bennett	20–11	9–7	6th	
2001–2002	Kathi Bennett	17–14	8–8	5th	Big Ten tournament Champions NCAA First Round
2002–2003	Kathi Bennett	13–15	5–11	8th	
2003–2004	Kathi Bennett	12–17	4–12	9th	
2004–2005	Kathi Bennett	10–18	3–13	9th	
Sharon Versyp (Big Ten Conference) (2005–2006)
2005–2006	Sharon Versyp	19–14	9–7	6th	
Felisha Leggette-Jack (Big Ten Conference) (2006–2012)
2006–2007	Felisha Leggette-Jack	19–14	6–10	9th	WNIT Third Round
2007–2008	Felisha Leggette-Jack	18–15	10–8	5th	WNIT Second Round
2008–2009	Felisha Leggette-Jack	21–11	11–7	5th	WNIT Quarter Finals
2009–2010	Felisha Leggette-Jack	14–16	7–11	10th	
2010–2011	Felisha Leggette-Jack	9–20	1–13	10th	
2011–2012	Felisha Leggette-Jack	6–24	1–15	11th	
Curt Miller (Big Ten Conference) (2012–2014)
2012–2013	Curt Miller	11–19	2–14	12th	
2013–2014	Curt Miller	21–13	5–11	8th	WNIT Quarter Finals
Teri Moren (Big Ten Conference) (2014–Present)
2014–2015	Teri Moren	15–16	4–14	12th	
2015–2016	Teri Moren	21–12	12–6	4th	NCAA Second Round
2016–2017	Teri Moren	21–11	10–6	4th	WNIT Quarter Finals
2017–2018	Teri Moren	23–14	9–7	7th	WNIT Champions
2018–2019	Teri Moren	21–13	8–10	10th	NCAA Second Round
2019–2020	Teri Moren	24–8	13–5	4th	NCAA Canceled
2020–2021	Teri Moren	21–6	16–2	2nd	NCAA Elite 8
2021–2022	Teri Moren	24–9	11–5	5th	NCAA Sweet 16
2022–2023	Teri Moren	28–4	16–2	1st	NCAA Second Round
2023–2024	Teri Moren	26–6	15–3	2nd	NCAA Sweet 16
2024–2025	Teri Moren	20–13	10–8	T-8th	NCAA Second Round
2025-2026	Teri Moren	18-14	6-12	13th	
2026-2027	Teri Moren	6-0			
