= Jill Chapman =

American basketball player (born 1979)

Personal information
- Born: November 4, 1979 (age 47) Montpelier, Indiana, U.S.
- Listed height: 6 ft 4 in (1.93 m)
- Listed weight: 206 lb (93 kg)

Career information
- High school: Blackford (Hartford City, Indiana)
- College: Indiana (1998–2002)
- WNBA draft: 2002: 2nd round, 21st overall pick
- Drafted by: Detroit Shock
- Position: Center

Career history
- 2002: Detroit Shock

Career highlights
- 2× First-team All-Big Ten (2001, 2002)
- Stats at Basketball Reference

Jill Chapman-Daily (born November 4, 1979) is an American former professional basketball player. She played 19 games for the Detroit Shock.

== Indiana statistics ==
Legend
GP	Games played	GS	Games started	MPG	Minutes per game
FG%	Field goal percentage	3P%	3-point field goal percentage	FT%	Free throw percentage
RPG	Rebounds per game	APG	Assists per game	SPG	Steals per game
BPG	Blocks per game	PPG	Points per game	**Bold**	Career high

Year	Team	GP	Points	FG%	3P%	FT%	RPG	APG	SPG	BPG	PPG
1998-99	Indiana	**31**	440	55.0%	**36.8%**	52.8%	7.6	0.5	0.6	1.2	14.2
1999-00	Indiana	28	451	52.9%	35.7%	**64.1%**	7.8	**1.1**	**1.3**	1.5	**16.1**
2000-01	Indiana	**31**	475	**54.8%**	0.0%	61.6%	7.5	1.0	1.0	1.6	15.3
2001-02	Indiana	**31**	**499**	53.9%	0.0%	58.6%	**9.1**	1.0	1.1	**2.2**	**16.1**
Career		121	1865	54.2%	36.4%	59.8%	8.0	0.9	1.0	1.6	15.4

== Professional statistics ==
Year	Team	GP	GS	MPG	FG%	3P%	FT%	RPG	APG	SPG	BPG	TO	PPG
2002	Detroit	19	0	6.3	.370	.000	.667	1.4	0.0	0.2	0.1	0.4	1.2

After Basketball Jill Chapman ended her basketball career in 2003 shortly after the birth of her first daughter.
