= Shay Ciezki =

American basketball player (born 2003)

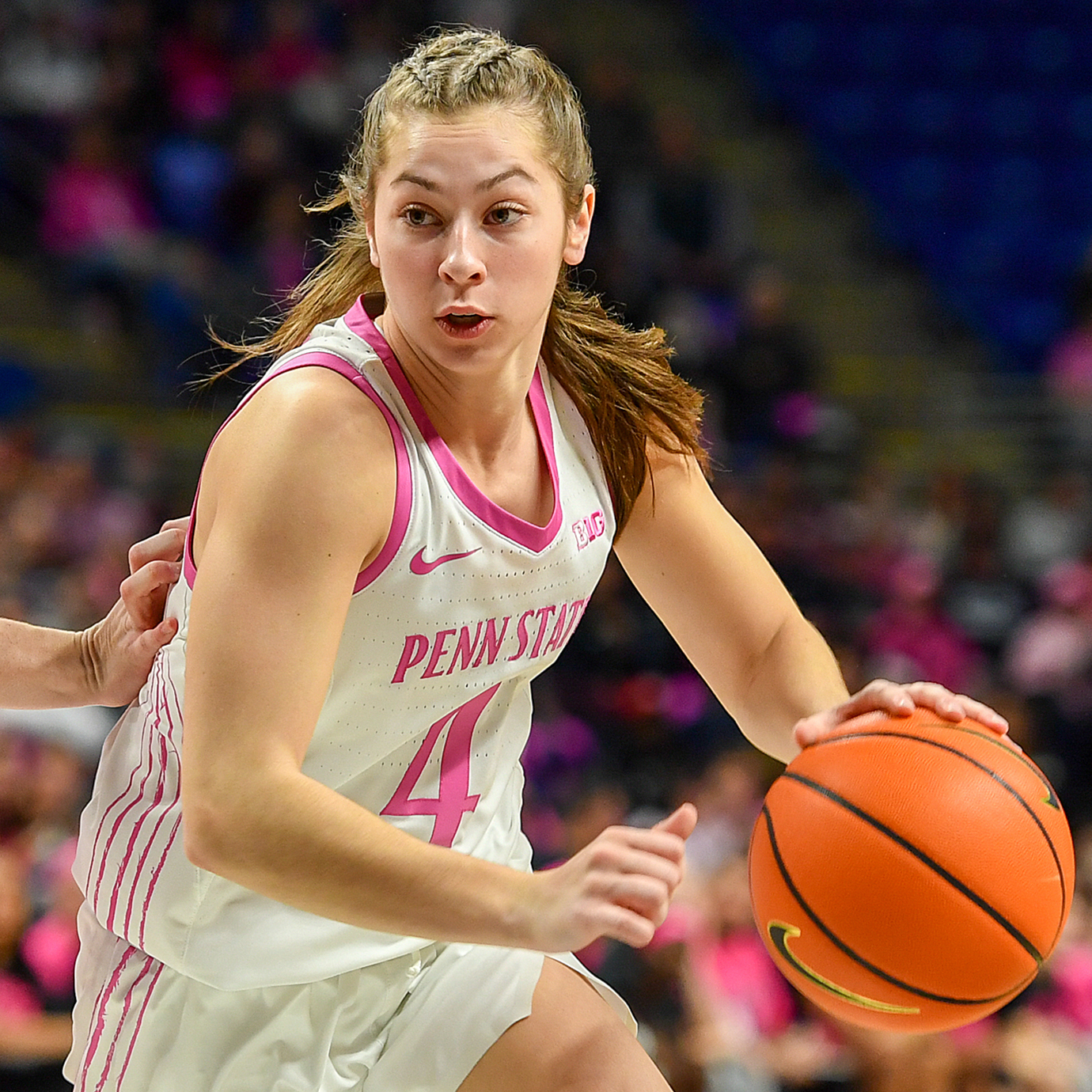
- Ciezki with Penn State in 2023

No. 5 – Phoenix Mercury
- Position: Guard
- League: WNBA

Personal information
- Born: November 26, 2003 (age 22)
- Listed height: 5 ft 7 in (1.70 m)

Career information
- High school: St. Mary's (Lancaster, New York)
- College: Penn State (2022–2024); Indiana (2024–2026)
- WNBA draft: 2026: undrafted
- Playing career: 2026–present

Career history
- 2026–present: Phoenix Mercury
- 2026–present: Adelaide Lightning

Career highlights
- First-team All-Big Ten (2026); Big Ten Medal of Honor (2026)
- Stats at WNBA.com
- Stats at Basketball Reference

Shay Ciezki (/ˈtʃɛski/, born November 26, 2003) is an American professional basketball player for the Phoenix Mercury of the Women's National Basketball Association (WNBA). She played college basketball for the Penn State Lady Lions and Indiana Hoosiers.

== Early life ==
Ciezki was born November 26, 2003, and attended St. Mary's High School in Lancaster, New York. She was a four-time season MVP and a three-year team captain on the school's basketball team. Her 2,138 career points, 478 career assists, and 381 career steals all set St. Mary's school records. Ciezki scored 51 points in a St. Mary's victory in the 2022 state championship game.

== College career ==
Ranked the No. 14 point guard prospect nationally by ESPN, Ciezki joined the Penn State Lady Lions for the 2022–23 season, playing in 30 games with 29 starts and averaging 11.8 points, 2.5 assists, 2.3 rebounds, and 1.2 steals per game. The following season, she played in all 35 games, with 30 starts; she averaged 11.5 points, 2.4 assists, and 2.1 rebounds per game, including a 40-point performance against the Central Connecticut Blue Devils, the third-most points scored in a game in Penn State program history.

Ciezki transferred to play for the Indiana Hoosiers starting with the 2024–25 season. She started in all 33 games of that season, averaging 11.8 points, 2.8 assists, and 2.1 rebounds per game. She recorded 16 points and three assists in Indiana's win against the Utah Utes in the first round of the 2025 NCAA Division I women's basketball tournament, adding 12 points in the team's second-round loss to the South Carolina Gamecocks.

Ciezki was the only Indiana starter to return to the team for the 2025–26 season. Her 22.8 points per game set a new Indiana single-season program record; she added 3.8 rebounds, 3.1 assists, and 1.5 steals per game. She recorded two double-doubles – the first in a win against the Marshall Thundering Herd, and the second in a win against the Purdue Boilermakers; the latter performance was shy of a triple-double by just two assists. Ciezki was named first-team All-Big Ten for the 2025–26 season; she also joined the "50–40–90 club", recording over 50% field goal percentage, 40% three-point field goal percentage, and 90% free throw percentage. After the season, she was invited to compete in the Celsius Women's 3-Point Championship contest; she finished second in the competition. Ciezki was named to the 2026 Big Ten Medal of Honor class for "excellence on and off the field".

== Professional career ==
After going unselected in the 2026 WNBA draft, Ciezki signed with the Phoenix Mercury of the Women's National Basketball Association (WNBA) as an undrafted free agent on April 14, 2026. She was waived on May 4. On May 7, the Mercury signed her to a developmental contract. She was released by the Mercury on June 4. On June 22, Ciezki signed another developmental contract with the Mercury. She made her WNBA debut later that day against the Indiana Fever.

On August 29, 2026, Ciezki scored 15 points, tied for the most among Phoenix players, as the Mercury defeated the Toronto Tempo 101–69. In the team's next game on September 17, Ciezki again led all Mercury players in scoring, recording a career-high 22 points in a 94–91 win against the Portland Fire. The next day, the Mercury signed her to a rest-of-season contract.

In July 2026, Ciezki signed with the Adelaide Lightning of the Women's National Basketball League (WNBL).

== Career statistics ==
Legend
GP	Games played	GS	Games started	MPG	Minutes per game	FG%	Field goal percentage
3P%	3-point field goal percentage	FT%	Free throw percentage	RPG	Rebounds per game	APG	Assists per game
SPG	Steals per game	BPG	Blocks per game	TO	Turnovers per game	PPG	Points per game
**Bold**	Career high	*	Led Division I	°	Led the league	‡	WNBA record

=== WNBA ===
WNBA regular season statistics
Year	Team	GP	GS	MPG	FG%	3P%	FT%	RPG	APG	SPG	BPG	TO	PPG
2026	Phoenix	8	0	15.6	.477	.389	.905	1.5	1.6	0.4	0.3	0.8	8.5
**Career**	1 year, 1 team	8	0	15.6	.477	.389	.905	1.5	1.6	0.4	0.3	0.8	8.5

=== College ===
NCAA statistics
Year	Team	GP	GS	MPG	FG%	3P%	FT%	RPG	APG	SPG	BPG	TO	PPG
2022–23	Penn State	30	29	31.2	.428	.416	.730	2.3	2.5	1.2	0.0	2.2	11.8
2023–24	Penn State	**35**	30	25.1	.423	.368	.902	2.1	2.4	1.0	0.1	**2.1**	11.5
2024–25	Indiana	33	**33**	33.8	.463	.392	**.932**	2.1	2.8	0.9	**0.3**	2.2	11.8
2025–26	Indiana	31	31	**35.5**	**.526**	**.446**	.908	**3.8**	**3.1**	**1.5**	0.2	3.4	**22.8**
**Career**		129	123	31.3	.468	.405	.890	2.6	2.7	1.2	0.1	2.5	14.4
