= Bea Gorton =

American college basketball coach (1946–2020)

Biographical details
- Born: July 27, 1946; Racine, Wisconsin, U.S.
- Died: July 14, 2020 (aged 73); Carol Stream, Illinois, U.S.

Playing career
- ?–1968: Wheaton

Coaching career (HC unless noted)
- 1969–1970: Wheaton
- 1971–1975: Indiana

Head coaching record
- Overall: 79–28 (.738)

Bea A. Gorton (July 27, 1946 – July 14, 2020) was an American college basketball coach.

Gorton was the first women's coach of the Indiana Hoosiers women's basketball at Indiana University, starting in 1971. She was a coach in the Association for Intercollegiate Athletics for Women (AIAW). She led IU to the AIAW Final Four in 1973, and the AIAW Elite Eight in 1972 and 1974. After that year she took the Indiana Hoosiers women's basketball to the National Women's Invitation Tournament. After she left IU after the 1975–76 basketball season, Gorton advised the AIAW organization until 1980.

Gorton was inducted into the school's Hall of Honor in 1988 and Indiana's Hall of Fame in 2014.

Gorton had a master's degree in sports medicine and earned her doctorate in biomechanics at Indiana while coaching.

Gorton died on 14 July 2020, aged 73.
