= 2025–26 Indiana Hoosiers women's basketball team =

American college basketball season

2025–25 Indiana Hoosiers women's basketball
- Conference: Big Ten Conference
- Record: 18–14 (6–12 Big Ten)
- Head coach: Teri Moren (12th season)
- Assistant coaches: Rhet Wierzba; Colsten Thompson; Ali Patberg
- Home arena: Simon Skjodt Assembly Hall

2025–26 Big Ten women's basketball standings
	Conf.				Overall
Team	W		L	PCT	W		L	PCT
No. 1 UCLA †	18	–	0	1.000	37	–	1	.974
No. 7 Michigan	15	–	3	.833	28	–	7	.800
No. 16 Iowa	15	–	3	.833	27	–	7	.794
No. 17 Ohio State	13	–	5	.722	27	–	8	.771
No. 15 Minnesota	13	–	5	.722	24	–	9	.727
No. 20 Maryland	11	–	7	.611	24	–	9	.727
No. 22 Michigan State	11	–	7	.611	23	–	9	.719
No. 25 Washington	10	–	8	.556	22	–	11	.667
USC	9	–	9	.500	18	–	14	.563
Illinois	9	–	9	.500	22	–	12	.647
Oregon	8	–	10	.444	23	–	13	.639
Nebraska	7	–	11	.389	19	–	13	.594
Indiana	6	–	12	.333	18	–	14	.563
Purdue	5	–	13	.278	13	–	17	.433
Wisconsin	5	–	13	.278	16	–	18	.471
Penn State	4	–	14	.222	11	–	18	.379
Northwestern	2	–	16	.111	8	–	21	.276
Rutgers	1	–	17	.056	9	–	20	.310
† 2026 Big Ten tournament winner Rankings from AP poll

The 2025–26 Indiana Hoosiers women's basketball team represents the Indiana University Bloomington during the 2025–26 NCAA Division I women's basketball season. The Hoosiers will be led by head coach Teri Moren in her 12th season, and play their home games at the Simon Skjodt Assembly Hall as a member of the Big Ten Conference.

== Previous season ==
The Hoosiers finished the 2024–25 season 20–13, 11–7 in Big Ten play to finish in a four-way tie for eighth place. As the No. 9 seed in the Big Ten tournament, they defeated Oregon in the second round before losing in the quarterfinals to USC in the quarterfinals. They received an at-large bid to the NCAA tournament as the No. 9 seed in the Birmingham 2 region. They defeated Utah in the first round before losing to South Carolina in the second round.

== Offseason ==
=== Departures ===
Indiana departures
Name	Num	Pos.	Height	Year	Hometown	Reason for Departure
Lexus Bargesser	1	G	5'9"	Junior	Grass Lake, MI	Transferred to Colorado State
Karoline Striplin	11	F	6'3"	Senior	Hartford, AL	Graduated
Yarden Garzon	12	G	6'3"	Junior	Ra'anana, Israel	Transferred to Maryland
Julianna LaMendola	20	G	6'1"	Sophomore	Coppell, TX	Transferred to Grand Canyon
Henna Sandvik	21	G	6'0"	Junior	Helsinki, Finland	Transferred to Wyoming
Chloe Moore-McNeil	22	G	5'11"	Graduate Student	Greenfield, TN	Graduated
Sharnecce Currie-Jelks	23	F	6'2"	Junior	Jackson, TN	Transferred to Murray State
Sydney Parrish	33	G	6'2"	Graduate Student	Fishers, IN	Graduated
Lilly Meister	52	F	6'3"	Junior	Rochester, MN	Transferred to Kansas

=== Incoming transfers ===
Indiana incoming transfers
Name	Num	Pos.	Height	Year	Hometown	Previous School
Phoenix Stotijn	1	G	5'9"	Sophomore	Amsterdam, Netherlands	Arkansas
Jerni Kiaku	7	G	5'7"	Senior	Garner, NC	Duquesne
Edessa Noyan	8	F	6'3"	Junior	Södertälje, Sweden	Virginia
Chloe Spreen	22	G	5'10"	Sophomore	Bedford, IN	Alabama
Zania Socka-Ngumen	23	F	6'3"	Sophomore	Silver Spring, MD	UCLA
Jade Ondineme	45	F	6'3"	Junior	Orléans, France	NW Florida State College

=== Recruiting classes ===
==== 2025 recruiting class ====
College recruiting
Name	Hometown	School	Height	Weight	Commit date
Maya Makalusky; W	Fishers, IN	Hamilton Southeastern High School	6 ft 3 in (1.91 m)	N/A	
Maya Makalusky; W	Recruit ratings: ESPN: (95)				
Nevaeh Caffey; PG	Saint Louis, MO	Incarnate Word Academy	5 ft 10 in (1.78 m)	N/A	
Nevaeh Caffey; PG	Recruit ratings: ESPN: (94)				
Overall recruit ranking:
Note: In many cases, Scout, Rivals, 247Sports, On3, and ESPN may conflict in their listings of height and weight.; In these cases, the average was taken. ESPN grades are on a 100-point scale.; Sources: "2025 Player Commits". ESPN. Archived from the original on July 18, 2025.

==== 2026 recruiting class ====
College recruiting (2026)
Name	Hometown	School	Height	Weight	Commit date
Ashlinn James; PG	Louisville, KY	DuPont Manual High School	5 ft 8 in (1.73 m)	N/A	
Ashlinn James; PG	Recruit ratings: 247Sports: ESPN: (93)				
Gigi Battle; SF	Edison, NJ	DME Academy Academy	5 ft 11 in (1.80 m)	N/A	
Gigi Battle; SF	Recruit ratings: 247Sports: ESPN: (95)				
Addison Nyemchek; SF	Red Bank, NJ	Red Bank Catholic High School	6 ft 1 in (1.85 m)	N/A	
Addison Nyemchek; SF	Recruit ratings: 247Sports: ESPN: (95)				
Overall recruit ranking:
Note: In many cases, Scout, Rivals, 247Sports, On3, and ESPN may conflict in their listings of height and weight.; In these cases, the average was taken. ESPN grades are on a 100-point scale.; Sources: "2026 Player Commits". ESPN. Archived from the original on July 18, 2025.

== Roster ==
2025–26 Indiana Hoosiers women's basketball team
Players
Coaches

Pos.	#	Name	Height	Year	Previous school	Hometown
G	1	Phoenix Stotijn	5 ft 9 in (1.75 m)	So	BC Triple Threat; Arkansas	Amsterdam, Netherlands
G	2	Nevaeh Caffey	5 ft 10 in (1.78 m)	Fr	Incarnate Word Academy	Warrenton, MO
F	3	Maya Makalusky	6 ft 3 in (1.91 m)	Fr	Hamilton Southeastern	Fishers, IN
G	5	Lenée Beaumont	6 ft 1 in (1.85 m)	RS So	Benet Academy	Lisle, IL
G	7	Jerni Kiaku	5 ft 7 in (1.7 m)	Sr	Garner Magnet; Duquesne	Garner, NC
F	8	Edessa Noyan	6 ft 3 in (1.91 m)	Jr	Täljegymnasiet; Virgina	Södertälje, Sweden
G	10	Shay Ciezki	5 ft 7 in (1.7 m)	Sr	St. Mary's; Penn State	Buffalo, NY
G	15	Valentyna Kadlecova	6 ft 0 in (1.83 m)	So	DSK Levharti Chomutov	Kadaň, Czech Republic
G	22	Chloe Spreen	5 ft 10 in (1.78 m)	So	Bedford North Lawrence; Alabama	Bedford, IN
F	23	Zania Socka-Nguemen	6 ft 3 in (1.91 m)	So	Sidwell Friends; UCLA	Silver Spring, MD
F	24	Sydney Fenn	6 ft 3 in (1.91 m)	RS Fr	AZ Compass Prep	Buffalo, NY
F	31	Faith Wiseman	6 ft 4 in (1.93 m)	So	Indian Creek	Martinsville, IN

Head coach

- Teri Moren (Purdue)

Assistant coach(es)

- Rhet Wierzba (Austin Peay)
- Colsten Thompson (Alabama–Huntsville)
- Ali Patberg (Indiana)

Legend

- (C) Team captain
- (S) Suspended
- (I) Ineligible
- (W) Walk-on
- Injured
- Current redshirt

Roster

== Schedule and results ==
Date time, TV	Rank^{#}	Opponent^{#}	Result	Record	High points	High rebounds	High assists	Site (attendance) city, state
Exhibition
October 27, 2025*; 7:00 p.m., B1G+		Missouri S&T	W 100–32		21 – Ciezki	9 – Tied	5 – Tied	Simon Skjodt Assembly Hall (7,413); Bloomington, IN
Regular Season
November 4, 2025*; 7:00 p.m., B1G+		Lipscomb	W 80–46	1–0	22 – Ciezki	6 – Tied	3 – Tied	Simon Skjodt Assembly Hall (7,503); Bloomington, IN
November 7, 2025*; 7:00 p.m., B1G+		UIC	W 72–56	2–0	35 – Ciezki	13 – Socka-Ngueman	5 – Tied	Simon Skjodt Assembly Hall (7,413); Bloomington, IN
November 11, 2025*; 7:00 p.m., B1G+		Marshall	W 57–51	3–0	13 – Tied	10 – Tied	4 – Beaumont	Simon Skjodt Assembly Hall (7,518); Bloomington, IN
November 16, 2025*; 5:00 p.m., ACCN		at Florida State	W 76–72	4–0	23 – Beaumont	13 – Socka-Ngueman	3 – Ciezki	Donald L. Tucker Civic Center (2,104); Tallahassee, FL
November 19, 2025*; 7:00 p.m., B1G+		Butler	W 72–53	5–0	21 – Beaumont	8 – Ciezki	3 – Caffey	Simon Skjodt Assembly Hall (7,716); Bloomington, IN
November 25, 2025*; 1:00 p.m., ESPN+		at Florida Gulf Coast	W 82–64	6–0	26 – Ciezki	7 – Socka-Ngueman	4 – Ciezki	Alico Arena (1,632); Fort Myers, FL
November 28, 2025*; 1:30 p.m., FloHoops		vs. Gonzaga; Coconut Hoops Blue Heron Division semifinals	W 76–72	7–0	24 – Ciezki	8 – Socka-Ngueman	4 – Beaumont	Alico Arena (761); Fort Myers, FL
November 30, 2025*; 1:30 p.m., FloHoops		vs. No. 10 Iowa State; Coconut Hoops Blue Heron Division Championship Game	L 95–106	7–1	38 – Ciezki	8 – Noyan	4 – Beaumont	Alico Arena (744); Fort Myers, FL
December 3, 2025*; 6:00 p.m., B1G+		Western Michigan	W 71–53	8–1	26 – Ciezki	11 – Noyan	4 – Ciezki	Simon Skjodt Assembly Hall (7,409); Bloomington, IN
December 6, 2025; 12:00 p.m., BTN		at Illinois	L 57–78	8–2 (0–1)	23 – Ciezki	6 – Tied	5 – Ciezki	State Farm Center (4,712); Champaign, IL
December 11, 2025*; 7:00 p.m., B1G+		Louisiana–Monroe	W 98–54	9–2	31 – Ciezki	9 – Noyan	5 – Beaumont	Simon Skjodt Assembly Hall (7,380); Bloomington, IN
December 14, 2025*; 1:00 p.m., B1G+		Eastern Michigan	W 74–67	10–2	25 – Ciezki	6 – Makalusky	4 – Tied	Simon Skjodt Assembly Hall (7,635); Bloomington, IN
December 21, 2025*; 1:00 p.m., B1G+		Western Carolina	W 71–44	11–2	17 – Ciezki	5 – Noyan	3 – Tied	Simon Skjodt Assembly Hall (7,875); Bloomington, IN
December 29, 2025; 6:00 p.m., B1G+		Minnesota	L 48–71	11–3 (0–2)	17 – Beaumont	7 – Noyan	9 – Ciezki	Simon Skjodt Assembly Hall (8,134); Bloomington, IN
January 1, 2026; 12:00 p.m., BTN		No. 24 Michigan State	L 60–80	11–4 (0–3)	16 – Ciezki	8 – Noyan	4 – Tied	Simon Skjodt Assembly Hall (7,892); Bloomington, IN
January 4, 2026; 6:00 p.m., BTN		at No. 7 Maryland	L 67–82	11–5 (0–4)	20 – Makalusky	15 – Ozzy-Momodu	6 – Poffenbarger	Xfinity Center (6,600); College Park, MD
January 8, 2026; 8:00 p.m., B1G+		at No. 25 Nebraska	L 73–78	11–6 (0–5)	31 – Ciezki	11 – Socka-Ngueman	4 – Ciezki	Pinnacle Bank Arena (4,480); Lincoln, NE
January 11, 2026; 5:00 p.m., BTN		No. 14 Iowa	L 53–56	11–7 (0–6)	21 – Ciezki	12 – Socka-Ngueman	4 – Beaumont	Simon Skjodt Assembly Hall (8,073); Bloomington, IN
January 14, 2026; 7:00 p.m., B1G+		Washington	L 63–82	11–8 (0–7)	23 – Ciezki	5 – Socka-Ngueman	3 – Caffey	Simon Skjodt Assembly Hall (7,352); Bloomington, IN
January 22, 2026; 8:00 p.m., Peacock		at No. 12 Ohio State	L 67–81	11–9 (0–8)	20 – Beaumont	10 – Socka-Ngueman	4 – Caffey	Value City Arena (5,242); Columbus, OH
January 25, 2026; 12:00 p.m., B1G+		at Purdue; Rivalry/Indiana National Guard Governor's Cup	L 69–80	11–10 (0–9)	37 – Ciezki	6 – Beaumont	4 – Caffey	Mackey Arena (7,917); West Lafayette, IN
January 29, 2026; 7:00 p.m., Peacock		No. 9 Michigan	L 67–95	11–11 (0–10)	17 – Makalusky	7 – Beaumont	4 – Tied	Simon Skjodt Assembly Hall (7,619); Bloomington, IN
February 1, 2026; 2:00 p.m., B1G+		Northwestern	W 89–75	12–11 (1–10)	33 – Ciezki	8 – Ciezki	5 – Ciezki	Simon Skjodt Assembly Hall (8,515); Bloomington, IN
February 4, 2026; 7:30 p.m., B1G+		at Wisconsin	W 77–74	13–11 (2–10)	31 – Ciezki	9 – Ciezki	5 – Caffey	Kohl Center (2,837); Madison, WI
February 8, 2026; 2:00 p.m., B1G+		Purdue; Rivalry/Indiana National Guard Governor's Cup	W 74–59	14–11 (3–10)	29 – Ciezki	12 – Ciezki	8 – Ciezki	Simon Skjodt Assembly Hall (9,110); Bloomington, IN
February 12, 2026; 10:00 p.m., BTN		at USC	L 73–79	14–12 (3–11)	29 – Makalusky	8 – Noyan	6 – Noyan	Galen Center (4,124); Los Angeles, CA
February 15, 2026; 3:00 p.m., Peacock		at No. 2 UCLA	L 48–92	14–13 (3–12)	13 – Makalusky	5 – Tied	2 – Beaumont	Pauley Pavilion (5,468); Los Angeles, CA
February 22, 2026; 1:00 p.m., BTN		Oregon	W 72–65	15–13 (4–12)	20 – Ciezki	8 – Noyan	6 – Ciezki	Simon Skjodt Assembly Hall (8,136); Bloomington, IN
February 25, 2026; 7:00 p.m., B1G+		at Rutgers	W 79–69	16–13 (5–12)	21 – Ciezki	15 – Noyan	4 – Beaumont	Jersey Mike's Arena (2,739); Piscataway, NJ
February 28, 2026; 2:00 p.m., B1G+		Penn State	W 93–59	17–13 (6–12)	29 – Ciezki	8 – Ondineme	5 – Caffey	Simon Skjodt Assembly Hall (8,447); Bloomington, IN
Big Ten tournament
March 4, 2026; 3:30 p.m., Peacock	(13)	vs. (12) Nebraska; First Round	W 72–69	18–13	22 – Ciezki	10 – Noyan	7 – Ciezki	Gainbridge Fieldhouse (6,587); Indianapolis, IN
March 5, 2026; 2:30 p.m., BTN	(13)	vs. (5) No. 11 Ohio State; Second Round	L 59–83	18–14	21 – Makalusky	11 – Noyan	5 – Ciezki	Gainbridge Fieldhouse (5,962); Indianapolis, IN
*Non-conference game. ^{#}Rankings from AP Poll. (#) Tournament seedings in parentheses. All times are in Eastern Time. Source:

== Rankings ==
Ranking movements Legend: ██ Increase in ranking ██ Decrease in ranking — = Not ranked RV = Received votes
	Week																				
Poll	Pre	1	2	3	4	5	6	7	8	9	10	11	12	13	14	15	16	17	18	19	Final
AP	—	—	—	—	—																
Coaches	RV	—	—	—	RV																
