= Indiana Hoosiers women's basketball =

2026–27 Indiana Hoosiers women's basketball team
- University: Indiana University Bloomington
- Head coach: Teri Moren (13th season)
- Location: Bloomington, Indiana
- Arena: Simon Skjodt Assembly Hall (capacity: 17,222)
- Conference: Big Ten
- Nickname: Hoosiers
- Colors: Crimson and cream
- Student section: Crimson Guard

NCAA Division I tournament Elite Eight
- 2021

NCAA Division I tournament Sweet Sixteen
- 2021, 2022, 2024

NCAA Division I tournament appearances
- 1983, 1994, 1995, 2002, 2016, 2019, 2021, 2022, 2023, 2024, 2025

Conference tournament champions
- 2002

Conference regular-season champions
- 1983, 2023

Uniforms
Home	Away

The Indiana Hoosiers women's basketball team is the intercollegiate women's basketball program who is representing Indiana University Bloomington. The school currently competes in the Big Ten Conference at the NCAA Division I level. The Hoosiers play home basketball games at Simon Skjodt Assembly Hall on the university campus in Bloomington, Indiana.

== History ==
=== Early years ===
==== Maxwell era (1891–1928) ====
1902 Indiana women's championship team (intramural)

The Maxwell Era of Women's Basketball at Indiana University saw the expansion of athletic opportunities and acceptance of women as athletes. Basketball was integrated into the physical education curriculum followed by interclass competition and intramurals. Juliette Maxwell dedicated her career to the advancement of athletics for the women at Indiana University.

The 1922 Arbutus reported women's athletics had taken hold of the co-ed especially basketball: "Basketball, the most popular sport of the Indiana coed, attracted more attention this year than ever before. More than two hundred from the freshman class alone tried out for team membership. Closely matched teams from all classes played a hotly contested tournament, which was won by the freshman without a single defeat."

In 1927–1928, the program was expanded to include within the Department of Physical Education for Women an Intramural Association, with a program geared to encourage participation in sports by the less highly skilled women students.

==== Departmental era (1928–1949) ====
The Departmental Era concentrated on the expansion of athletics by increasing the sports offered, hiring more faculty, and expanding the interclass and intramural programs sponsored by the department. Edna Munro oversaw the expansion of the intramural program, Collegiate and High School Play Days, Women's Athletic Association, Women's Recreational Association, and basketball interest groups.

Around 1928–1930, the national "Play Day" program of non-coached intercollegiate sports competition for women was initiated as part of the National Women's Athletic Association's program. Indiana University's WAA supported the program and created opportunities for Play Days to occur for the next several decades. It entered its contestants in the annual state-limited gatherings which rotated yearly from one campus to another. These programs provided the opportunity for women to experience competition in a wholesome healthy atmosphere, devoid of bias and strong emotion. The success of the college-sponsored competitions influenced the Indiana University faculty to initiate "Play Days" for high school girls under their Girls’ Athletic Association organizations.

==== Women's Recreational Association era (1949–1961) ====
During the Women's Recreational Association Era in women's basketball, the intramural program was changed to incorporate more women into athletics on campus. By the end of this era, 70% of women on Indiana University – Bloomington's campus were active in the WRA and athletics.

==== Extramural era (1961–1971) ====
The Extramural Era saw regional competition grow. Teams representing Indiana University began playing in tournaments and series with other universities in the region including Butler University, Marion College, Purdue University, and Indiana Central College. A small budget helped keep these budding basketball teams afloat during this time.

The Indiana University Nurse's Team competes in regional competition. "In spite of their busy schedules of classes and ward duty, student nurses take time out for basketball. The Nurses Basketball Team this year aspired to regain the championship of the Indianapolis Schools of Nursing Basketball Tourney. The team lost the championship in 1959 for the first time since the beginning of the tournament. The players compete with other girls’ teams in the area in addition to participating in the tournament."

By 1961, the extramural women's basketball team had begun to travel throughout the state to play in competitions. The basketball team was coached by Dr. Kay Burrus who helped expand the extramural sport system at Indiana University. The funding for women's basketball or women's athletics in general was meager at Indiana. This forced Burrus's teams to sleep in teammates homes and be responsible for their own transportation and food. Additionally, the women had to share uniforms among sports teams.

By 1969–1970 basketball season, the Hoosier women began to play by the "men's rules" for the first. In order to keep the basketball program within the budget, faculty served as game officials, referees, seamstresses, manages, and coaches without additional compensation for their time.

=== Varsity basketball ===
In 1971, Bea Gorton became the first head basketball coach for the Indiana University women's basketball team. Like other faculty members, Gorton did not receive compensation for her coaching position. It was considered part of her graduate assistantship while she worked towards her degree. In their inaugural season, they went 14–2, winning their first 12 games of the season before losing at Nationals to Immaculata University. In 1982, Indiana joined the Big Ten Conference for women's basketball, and the Hoosiers won the conference title with a 15–3 conference record, under Maryalyce Jeremiah (who was later named Big Ten Coach of the Year). Their season ended with a second round loss in the NCAA tournament to #8 Georgia.

Teri Moren was hired as the head coach of the Indiana Hoosiers women's basketball team on August 9, 2014.

The 2015–2016 season was a historic one, despite having only one senior and a second year coach. The Hoosiers finished with a 21–12 record with a 12–6 record in conference play under Moren in her second year as head coach. She was named Big Ten Coach of the Year, the first Indiana women's basketball coach to do so since Maryalyce Jeremiah in 1982. Sophomore Tyra Buss was named to the All-Big Ten first team, with fellow sophomore Amanda Cahill receiving honorable mention. The Hoosiers finished a perfect 14–0 at home and finished fourth in the Big Ten conference, behind #5 Maryland, #9 Ohio State, and #16 Michigan State. After regular season play was over, the Hoosiers received a #9 seed and were able to participate in the NCAA tournament for the first time in 14 years. Indiana defeated the Georgia Bulldogs 62–58 for their first NCAA tournament win in 33 years before falling to #1 seed Notre Dame Fighting Irish.

The Hoosiers' 2017–18 season proved to be another historic season. Led by seniors Tyra Buss and Amanda Cahill, the Hoosiers compiled a 23–14 record and won the 2018 WNIT in front of a program record-breaking crowd of 13,007 at Simon Skjodt Assembly Hall. Considered to be one of the greatest basketball players to ever come through IU, Buss holds programs records for points, assists, steals, and free throws made, along with ranking fourth in Hoosiers history with 2,364 points behind only Steve Alford (22,438 points), MacKenzie Holmes (2,530 points), and Calbert Cheaney (2,613 points).

For the 2020–21 season, the Hoosiers advanced to their first ever Elite Eight of the 2021 NCAA Division I women's basketball tournament before being eliminated in a 66–53 loss to Arizona. The Hoosiers finished the season with a 21–6 record.

== Facilities ==
=== Wylie Hall (1890–1896) ===
In the beginning of Women's Gymnasium the basement of Wylie Hall was used. Beginning in 1890, physical training for women occurred in the room pictured above. This space proved to be difficult in regards to playing basketball. Six support pillars proved a safety hazard which caused the women to play basketball more cautiously than desired. In addition, Wylie Hall housed the chemistry laboratories so the fumes in the basement at times were almost unbearable. Other difficulties with this space included the fact that the hall and stairway remained unheated and became very cold in the winter months and the ceiling was very low in the women could almost touch the basketball rim. However, the women proved to be crafty in their method of accessing the gym.

=== Mitchell Hall (1896–1906) ===
Mitchell Hall was used after the women's gymnasium was moved from Wylie Hall and before the completion of the Student Building. From 1886 to 1906, Mitchell Hall was the physical activity center for the coed athlete. The women were permitted to use the men's gymnasium for their spring championship game which became an annual tradition and was opened to the public for a small fee in 1899 marking the first time at Indiana University women were seen performing athletic activities.

=== Frances Morgan Swain Student Building(1906-1960s) ===
Formerly known as the Student Building, the women used this building as the athletic hub of campus for several decades. Mrs. Joseph Swain proposed the Student Building as the Woman's Building and believed it should serve as a social center for the students at the university and proved an adequate gymnasium. After the completion of the building, the Women's Gymnasium took over the north wing of the Student Building which had an exercising room that was 80 feet long by 50 feet wide. It had a gallery overlooking the room for viewing the athletics. In this building, the athletic program for women continued to expand. In 1906, the inaugural year of the Student Building, the Senior girls organized a team. Their ignition of creating an interclass competition added much excitement among the classes. There were enough girls interested in basketball that two freshman teams were organized. They held a scrimmage between the "Reds" and "Whites" to determine which would represent the Freshman class in the interclass tournament. Juliette Maxwell and Mary Roddy acted as coaches for the teams. This form of interclass rivalry continued throughout the early decades of the 20th century.

The interclass competition created a system for women to organize themselves into teams. However, the best athletes in the program were selected for the honorary varsity team. The basketball photo in the 1922 Arbutus labeled the interclass competition "As Thrilling as the Men's Game". Basketball held the hearts of coed athletes as year after year a surplus of women tried out to represent their respective class teams. The development of the program led to more drills and practices for women to improve their skills.

It is unclear the exact date the Student Building ceased to be the main arena of women's athletics at Indiana University. It is known that in 1940 additions were made to Student Building which was still used as the headquarters for athletics. Sometime after this the women's athletics moved to the Wildermuth center which would have occurred after the Men's Gymnasium moved to its new facilities.

=== Wildermuth Field house (1960s–1972) ===
The Wildermuth Fieldhouse was used for the Men's Gymnasium and IU Men's Basketball Team starting in the 1928–1929 season. The Men's Basketball team relocated to the "New Fieldhouse" in the 1960 season and then to Assembly Hall in 1971. While documentation is unclear on the exact transition of Women's Gymnasium to the School of Public Health, it is known the facilities were used by coed athletes by the 1960s.

=== Assembly Hall (1972–present) ===
Women's Basketball was played at Assembly Hall starting in 1972, but their program was not integrated into the Athletic Department until 1974. It was in 1974 that the university acknowledged the presence and included women's athletics as part of the Athletic Department and gave full support in the development of the program. This occurs two years after Title IX was passed. Assembly Hall has continued to be the home of Women's Athletics and especially women's basketball since the early 1970s.

== Current roster ==
=== 2026-27 Indiana Hoosiers women's basketball team ===
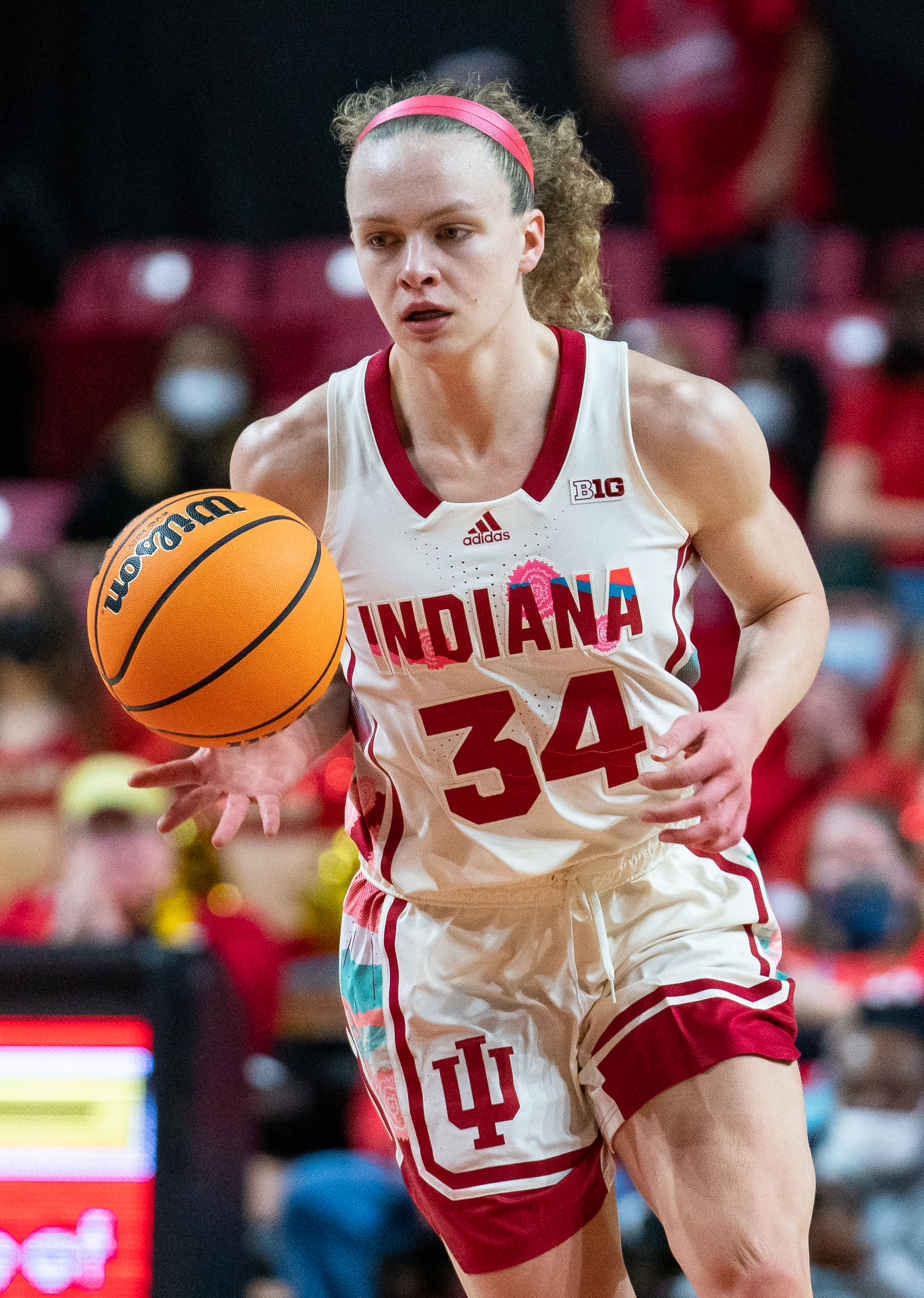
Grace Berger

#	Player	Pos.	Ht.	Yr.	Hometown/High School	Previous School
0	Malia Samuels	G	5-7	4th	Seattle, Wash. / Garfield	USC
3	Maya Makalusky	F	6-3	2nd	Fishers, Ind. / Hamilton Southeastern	
4	Sydney Fenn	F	6-3	3rd	Buffalo, NY / AZ Compass Prep	
5	Lenee Beaumont	G	6-1	4th	Lisle, Ill. / Benet Academy	
8	Ashlyn Anderson	F	6-3	3rd	Latchford, Ont., Canada	Fanshawe College
10	Camille Pangonis	G	5-11	1st	Burlington, Ont., Canada / Fort Erie International Academy	
12	Jess Petrie	F	6-2	4th	Gold Coast, Australia / Lake Ginnindera College	Nebraska
13	Ashlinn James	G	5-8	1st	Louisville, Ky. / Assumption	
15	Alisa Williams	F	6-2	5th	Denton, Texas / Braswell	LSU / Iowa State
22	Kenzie Hare	G	5-9	5th	Bartlett, Ill. / Naperville North	Marquette / Iowa State
23	Zania Socka-Nguemen	F	6-3	3rd	Silver Spring, Md. / Sidwell Friends	UCLA
24	GiGi Battle	G	6-0	1st	Edison, N.J. / DME Academy	
30	Zoe Jackson	F	6-4	1st	Oakville, NSW Australia / Arndell Anglican College	
55	Addy Nyemchek	F	6-2	1st	Oceanport, N.J. / Red Bank Catholic	

== Head coaches ==
=== 2026-27 Coaching staff ===
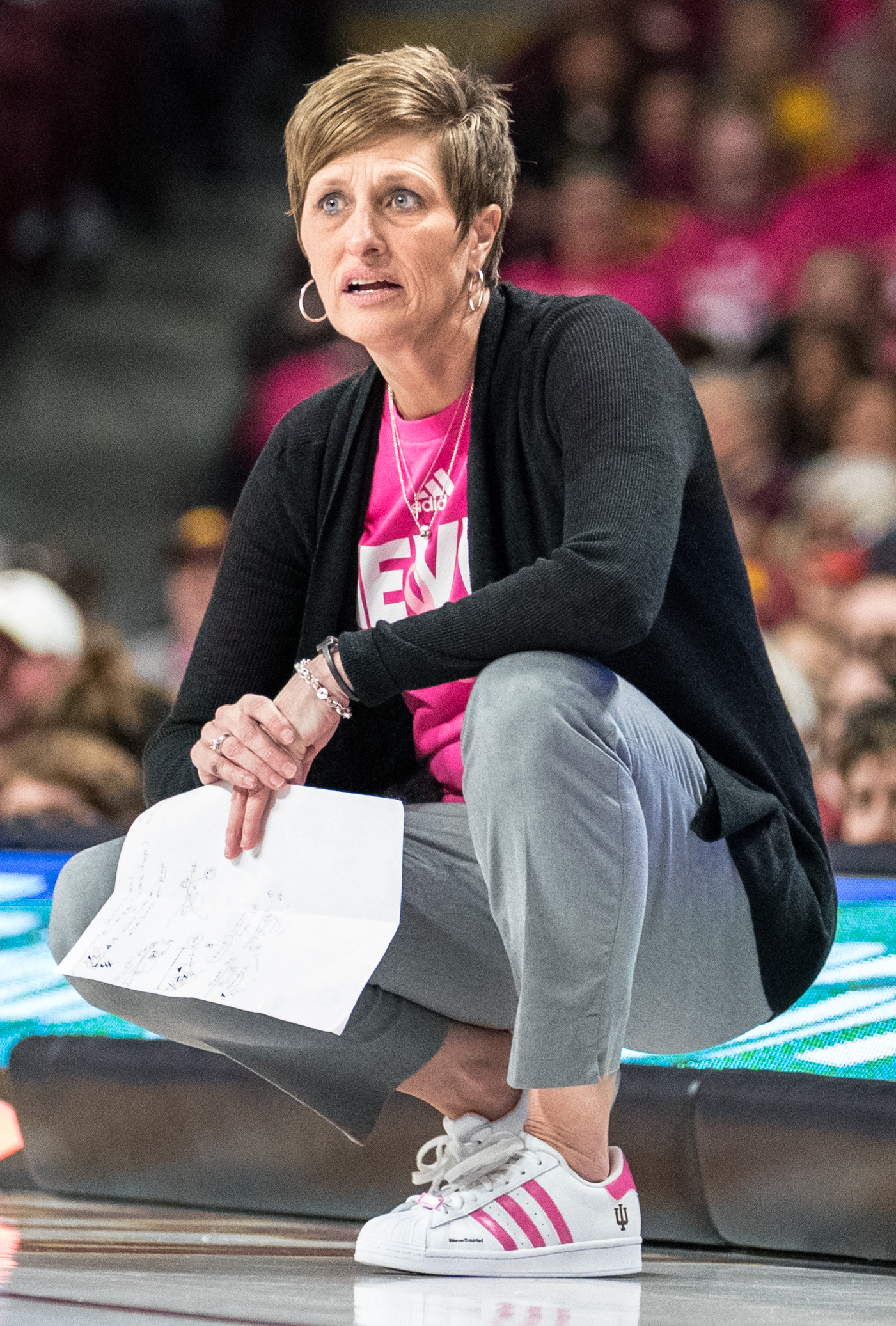
Teri Moren, current head coach

Name	Title
Teri Moren	Head coach
Rhet Wierzba	Associate Head Coach
Paul Miller	Assistant Coach
Ali Patberg	Assistant Coach
Colsten Thompson	Assistant Coach & Recruiting Coordinator
Keyanna Warthen	Assistant Coach
Fred Williams	Assistant Coach
Liz Honegger	Director of Basketball Operations
Briana Shomaeker	Director of Player Personnel
Kylie Durkee	Director of Athletic Performance
Sammy Smith	Team & Recruitment Analyst
Mike Pruden	Digital Media Content Manager

=== Coaching history ===
Coach	Years	Record	Conference Record	Conference Titles
Bea Gorton	1971–1976	73–28	0–0	0
Joy Malchodi	1977–1980	60–56	0–0	0
Maryalyce Jeremiah	1980–1985	90–63	37–17	1
Jorja Hoehn	1985–1988	39–44	22–32	0
Jim Izard	1988–2000	188–159	83–121	0
Kathi Bennett	2000–2005	72–75	29–41	1
Sharon Versyp	2005–2006	19–14	9–7	0
Felisha Legette-Jack	2006–2012	87–100	38–64	0
Curt Miller	2012–2014	33–32	7–27	0
Teri Moren	2014–present	211–94	101–57	1
Totals		848–655	315–354	3

== Season-by-season records ==
For the entire season-by-season results, see List of Indiana Hoosiers women's basketball seasons

== Postseason ==
=== NCAA Division I ===
The Hoosiers have competed in the NCAA Division I women's basketball tournament eleven times. Their combined record is 12–11.

Year	Seed	Round	Opponent	Result
1983	#6	First round Second round	#3 Kentucky #2 Georgia	W 87–76; L 86–70
1994	#12	First round	#5 Ole Miss	L 83–61
1995	#14	First round	#3 Georgia	L 81–64
2002	#9	First round	#8 TCU	L 55–45
2016	#9	First round Second round	#8 Georgia #1 Notre Dame	W 62–58; L 87–70
2019	#10	First round Second round	#7 Texas #2 Oregon	W 69–65; L 91–68
2021	#4	First round Second round Sweet Sixteen; Elite Eight	#13 VCU #12 Belmont #1 NC State #3 Arizona	W 63–32; W 70–48; W 73–70; L 53–66
2022	#3	First round Second round Sweet Sixteen	#14 Charlotte #11 Princeton #2 UConn	W 85–51; W 56–55; L 58–75
2023	#1	First round Second round	#16 Tennessee Tech #9 Miami	W 77–47; L 68–70
2024	#4	First round Second round Sweet Sixteen	#13 Fairfield #5 Oklahoma #1 South Carolina	W 89–56; W 75-68; L 75–79
2025	#9	First round Second round	#8 Utah #1 South Carolina	W 76–68; L 53–64

=== AIAW Division I ===
The Hoosiers made three appearances in the AIAW National Division I basketball tournament, with a combined record of 6–4.

Year	Round	Opponent	Result
1972	First round Quarterfinals	Southern Connecticut State; Immaculata	W, 49–30; L, 46–49
1973	First round Quarterfinals; Semifinals; Third-place game	Lehman; East Stroudsburg State; Queens (NC); Southern Connecticut State	W, 46–43; W, 56–52; L, 40–52; W, 76–53
1974	First round Quarterfinals; Consolation Second round Consolation third round	Wayland Baptist; Immaculata; Western Washington; Tennessee Tech	W, 59–56; L, 56–60; W, 50–44; L, 44–72

=== Career leaders ===
- Points scored: 2,530 (Mackenzie Holmes 2020-24)
- Assists: 574 (Tyra Buss 2015–18)
- Rebounds: 1,273 (Denise Jackson 1981–84)
- Steals: 293 (Tyra Buss 2015–18)
- Blocks: 269 (Quacy Barnes 1995–98)

=== Single season leaders ===
- Points scored: 763 (Tyra Buss 2017–18)
- Assists: 206 (Lori Burroughs 1979–80)
- Rebounds: 366 (Denise Jackson 1982–83)
- Steals: 96 (Lori Burroughs 1978–79)
- Blocks: 95 (Quacy Barnes 1996–97)

=== Single game leaders ===
- Points scored: 40 (by Karna Abram vs Michigan State – 1987)
- Assists: 15 (by Tracy Krick vs Purdue – 1985)
- Rebounds: 22 (by Denise Jackson vs Purdue – 1981 & by Shirley Bryant vs Michigan – 1985)
- Steals: 9 (by Kim Roberson vs Wake Forest – 2008, by Deb McClurg vs Northwestern – 1982, and by Amy Cherubini vs UIC – 1991)
- Blocks: 10 (by Quacy Barnes vs Youngstown State – 1997)

=== Hall of Fame Inductees ===
- Abram Chier, Karna
  - Inducted in 2008.
  - Abram won basketball letters in 1984, 1985, 1986, and 1987. She was First Team All-Big Ten in 1985, 1986, and 1987. Additionally, Abram was Academic Big-Ten in 1987. She was the first Indiana University Female Athlete of the Year in 1987.
  - Second leading scorer in Indiana history and lead the Big Ten in scoring in 1987.
- Gorton, Bea
  - Inducted in 2014.
  - First Women's Head Basketball Coach. Served as head coach from 1971 to 1976 while she was a graduate student on the Bloomington campus.
  - Under her direction, the varsity program became the most accomplished Hoosier women's basketball team to date. Gorton had an 81% winning percentage, 2 Elite 8 appearances (1972 and 1974), and an AIAW Final 4 appearance in 1973.
  - She served as an advisor to the AIAW from 1975 to 1980, served on the Kodak Coaches All-American Selection Committee in 1975–1976, was a speaker at the International Olympic Scientific Congress in 1984 and 1988, and consulted at the Paralympics in New York City in 1984.
- Jackson Salters, Denise
  - Inducted in 2010.
  - Salters won basketball letters in 1981, 1982, 1983, and 1984. She was First Team All-Big Ten in 1983 and 1984. She was also a District All-American in 1983 and 1984, two-time Wade Trophy finalist, and IU Female Athlete of the Year in 1983.
  - Indiana's all-time leading scorer at time of her graduation with 1,917 points and still all-time leading rebounder with 1,263 rebounds.
- Oing, Debra "Debbie"
  - Inducted in 1997.
  - Oing played in the first few years of varsity basketball at Indiana University from 1972 to 1975. She led the team to a fourth-place finish in the National Tournament in 1973.
  - Won Kodak All-American honors in 1975. She was National AAU Tournament Rookie of the Year in 1975 and member of the 1975 AAU All-Star Team.
- VanDerveer, Tara
  - Inducted in 1995.
  - VanDerveer was a three-year letter winner for the Indiana University Women's Basketball Team in 1973, 1974, and 1975.
  - She went on to be named big Ten Coach of the Year at Ohio State in 1984 and 1985, Pac 10 Coach of the Year in 1989, 1990, and 1995.
  - Named National Coach of the Year in 1988, 1989, and 1990.
  - Named head coach of the World University Games Team in 1991 and 1995–1996 USA Women's National Team which won Gold at the 1996 Olympic Games in Atlanta.
  - Formerly the head coach at Stanford.
  - Inducted into the Naismith Memorial Basketball Hall of Fame as a coach in 2011.
  - Became only the second Division I women's coach, and third Division I coach overall, with 1,000 career wins in 2017.

=== Big Ten Medal of Honor ===
- 1989 – Ann Mooney
- 2009 – Whitney Thomas
- 2018 - Tyra Buss

== See also ==
- NCAA Division I women's basketball tournament
- Women's Basketball Invitation Tournament
- Women's National Invitation Tournament
