= List of University of Michigan sporting alumni =

The parent article is at List of University of Michigan alumni

This is a list of sporting persons who attended the University of Michigan.

== Sports ==
=== Baseball ===
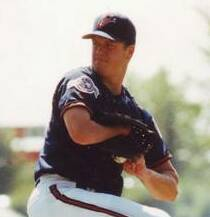
Jim Abbott

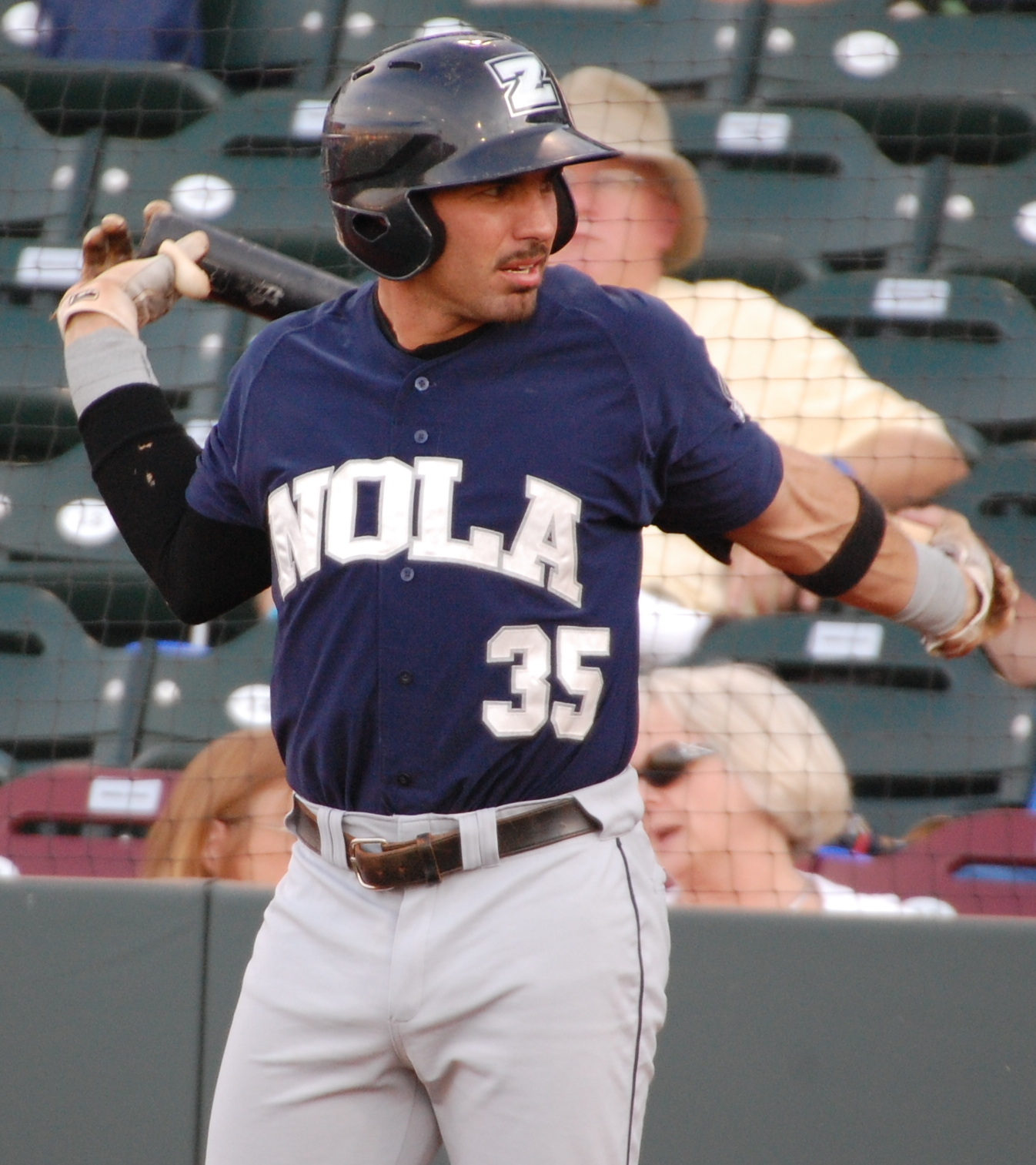
Mike Cervenak

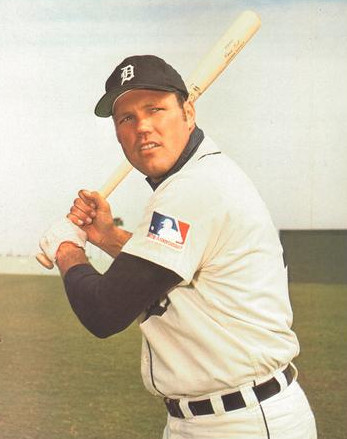
Bill Freehan

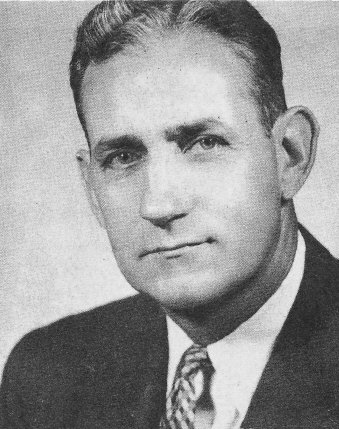
Charlie Gehringer

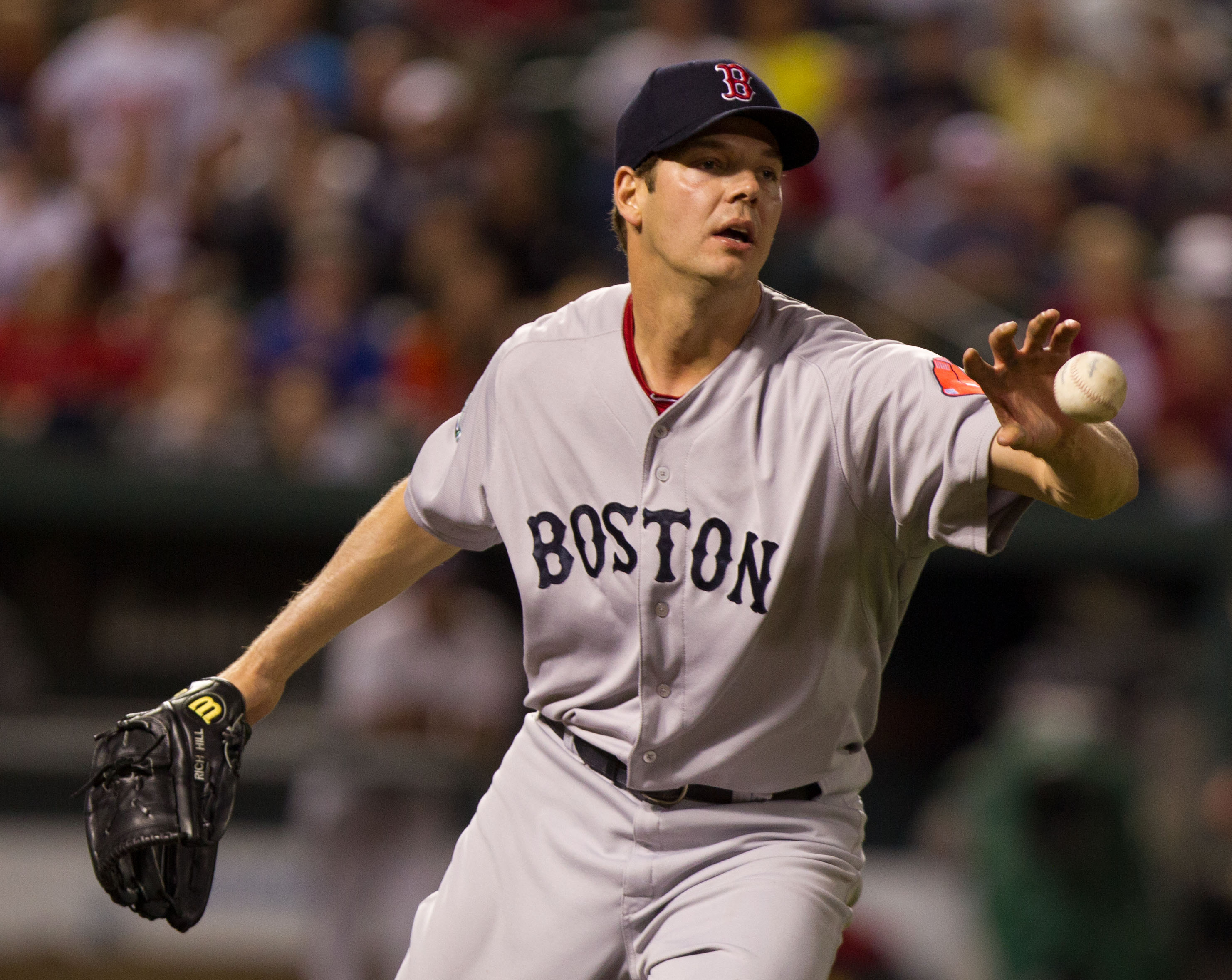
Rich Hill

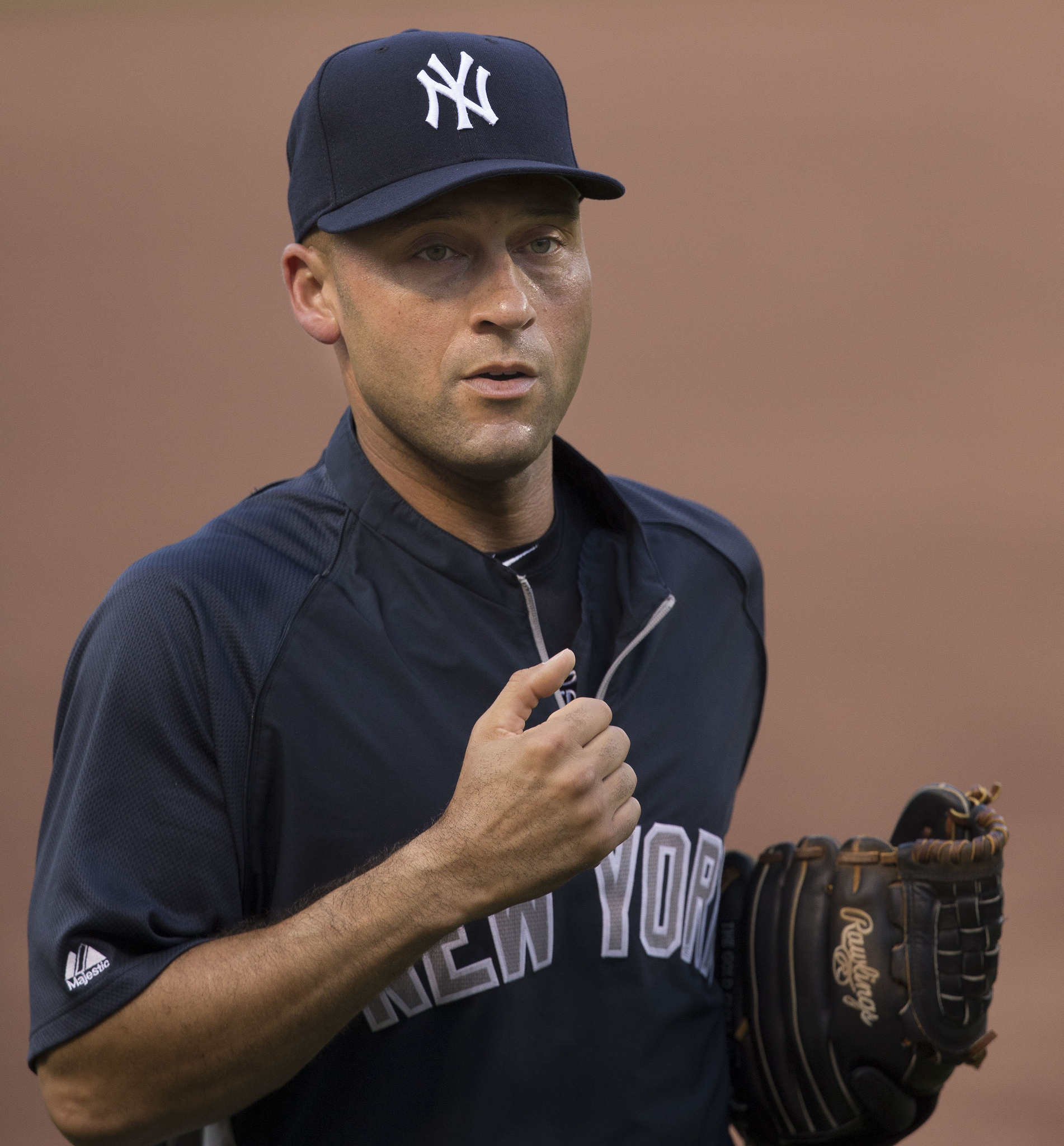
Derek Jeter

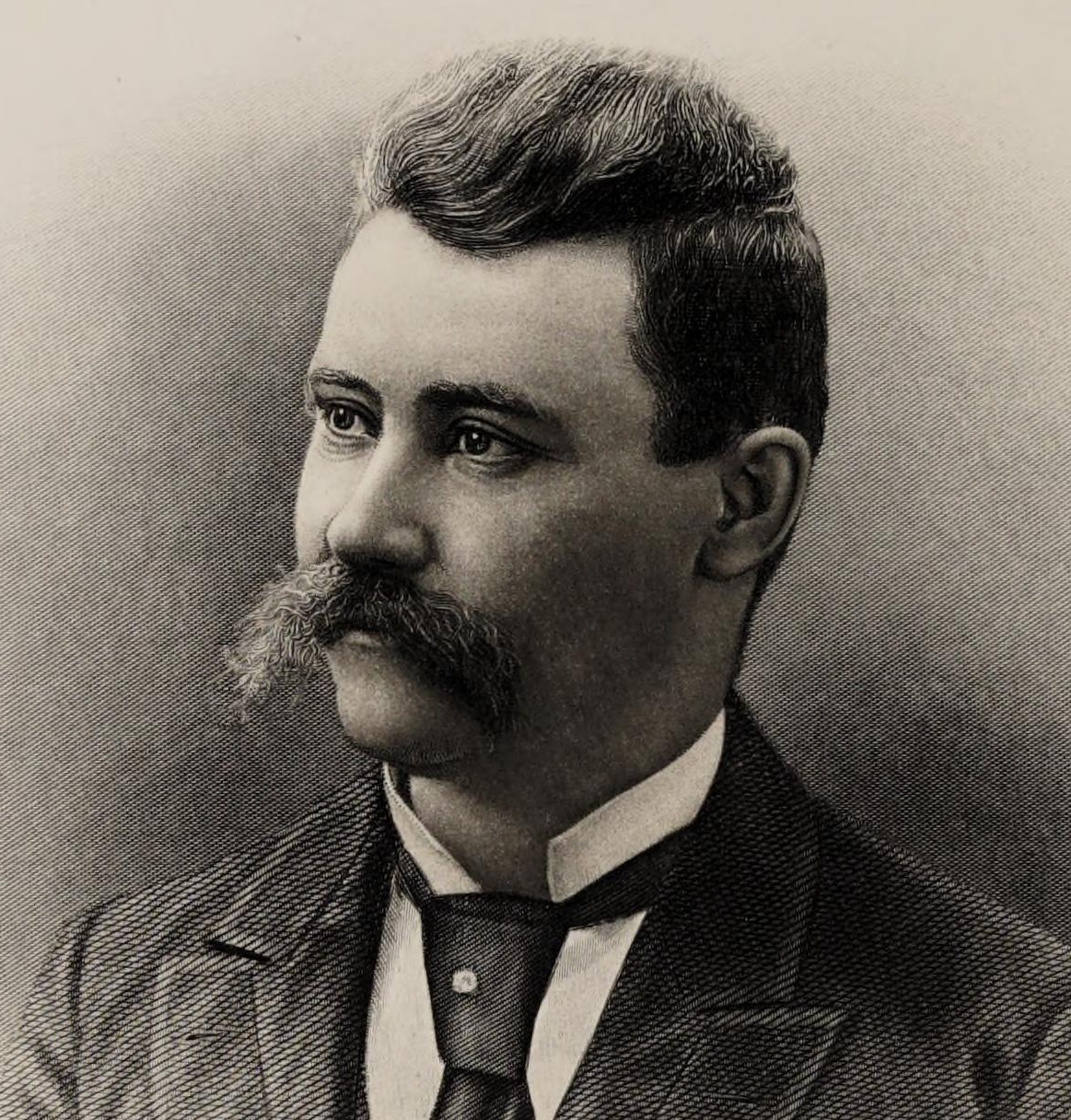
Henry Killilea

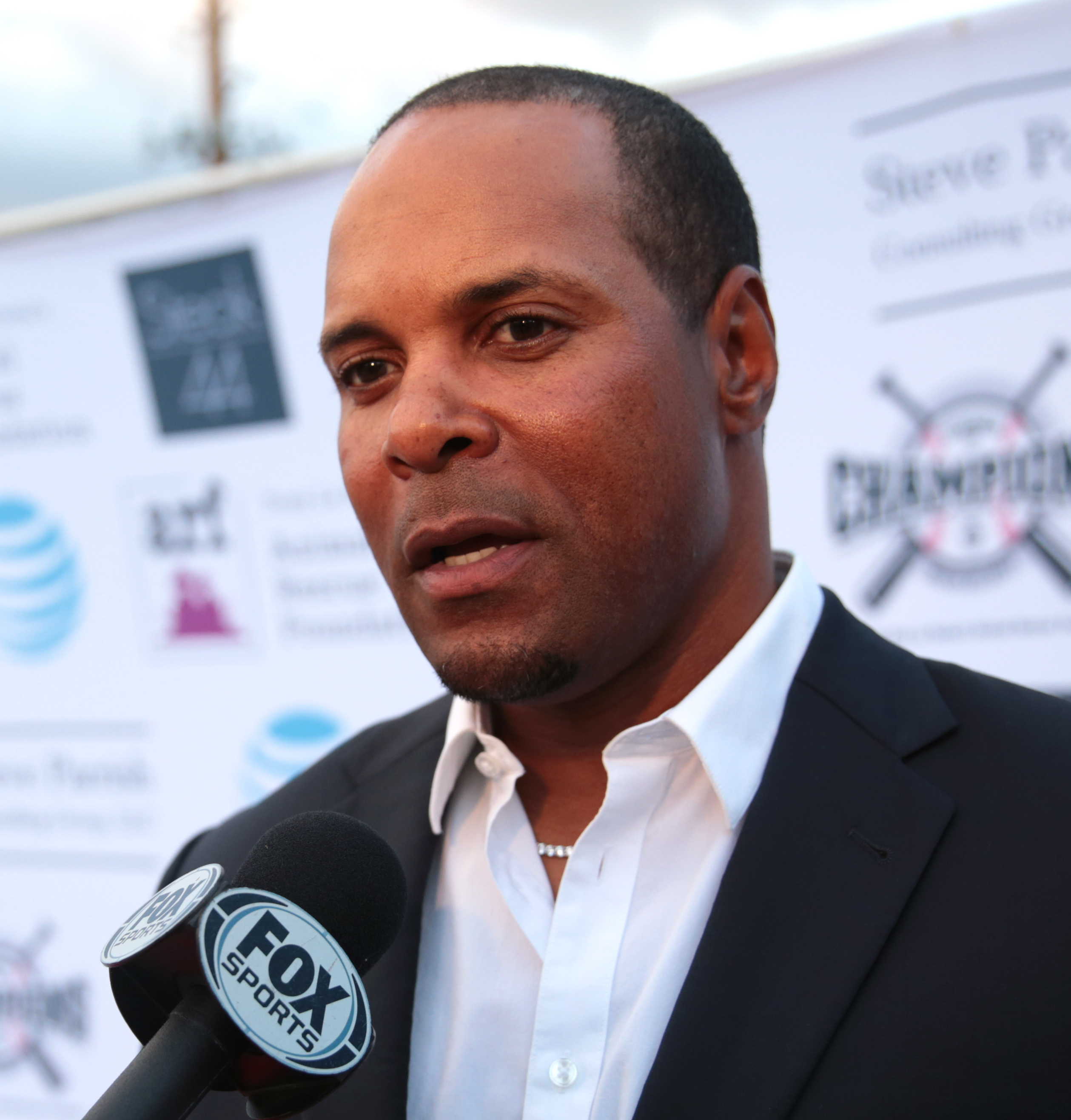
Barry Larkin

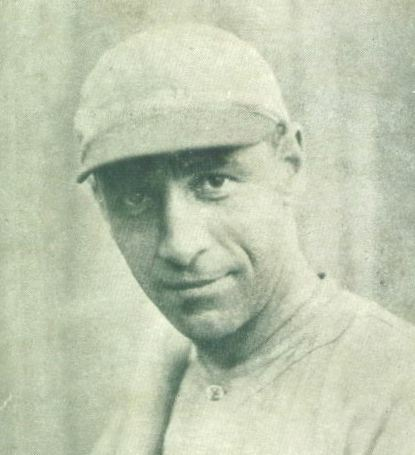
Doc Lavan

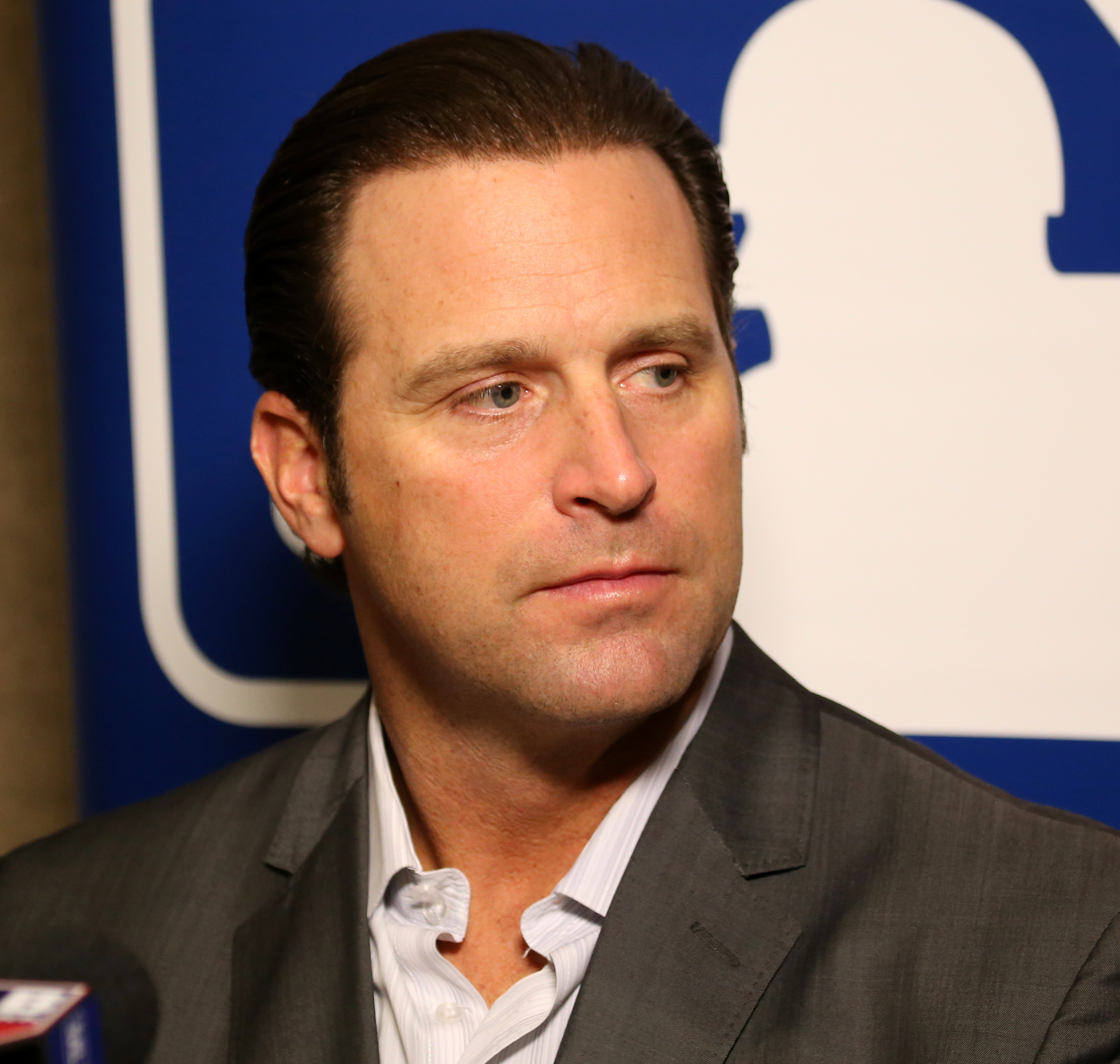
Mike Matheny

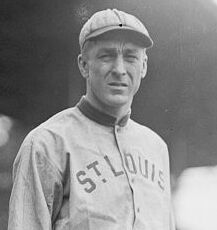
Branch Rickey

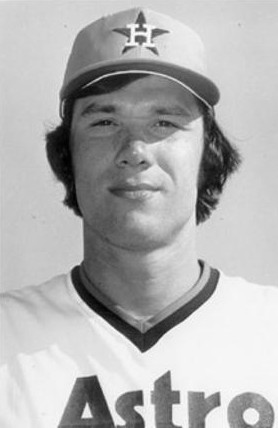
Leon Roberts

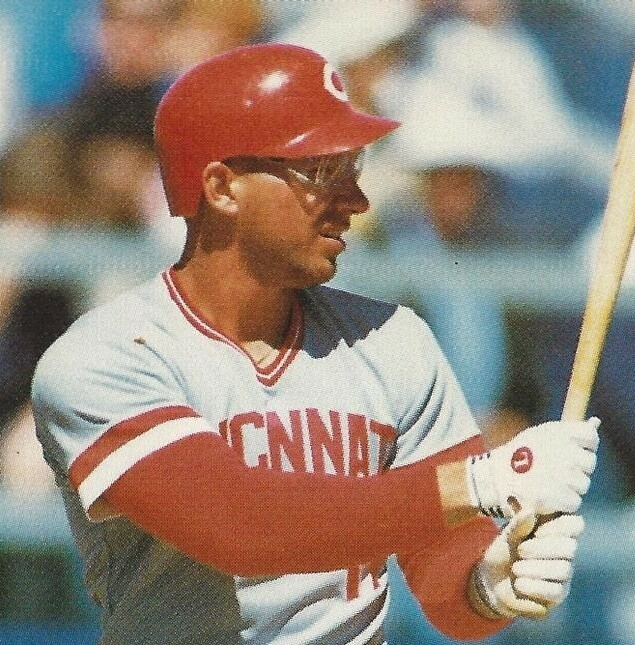
Chris Sabo

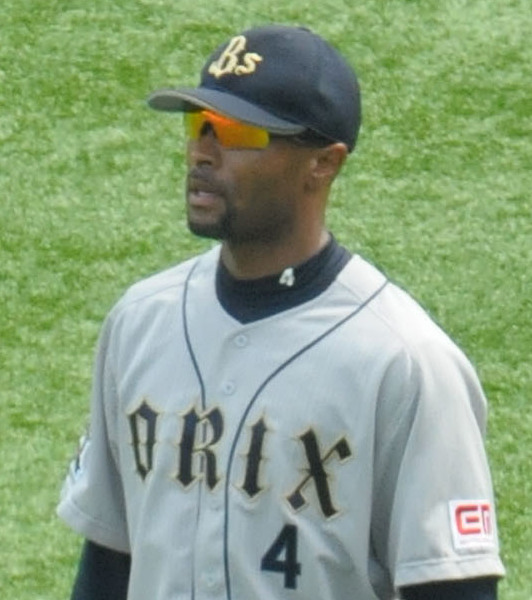
Bobby Scales

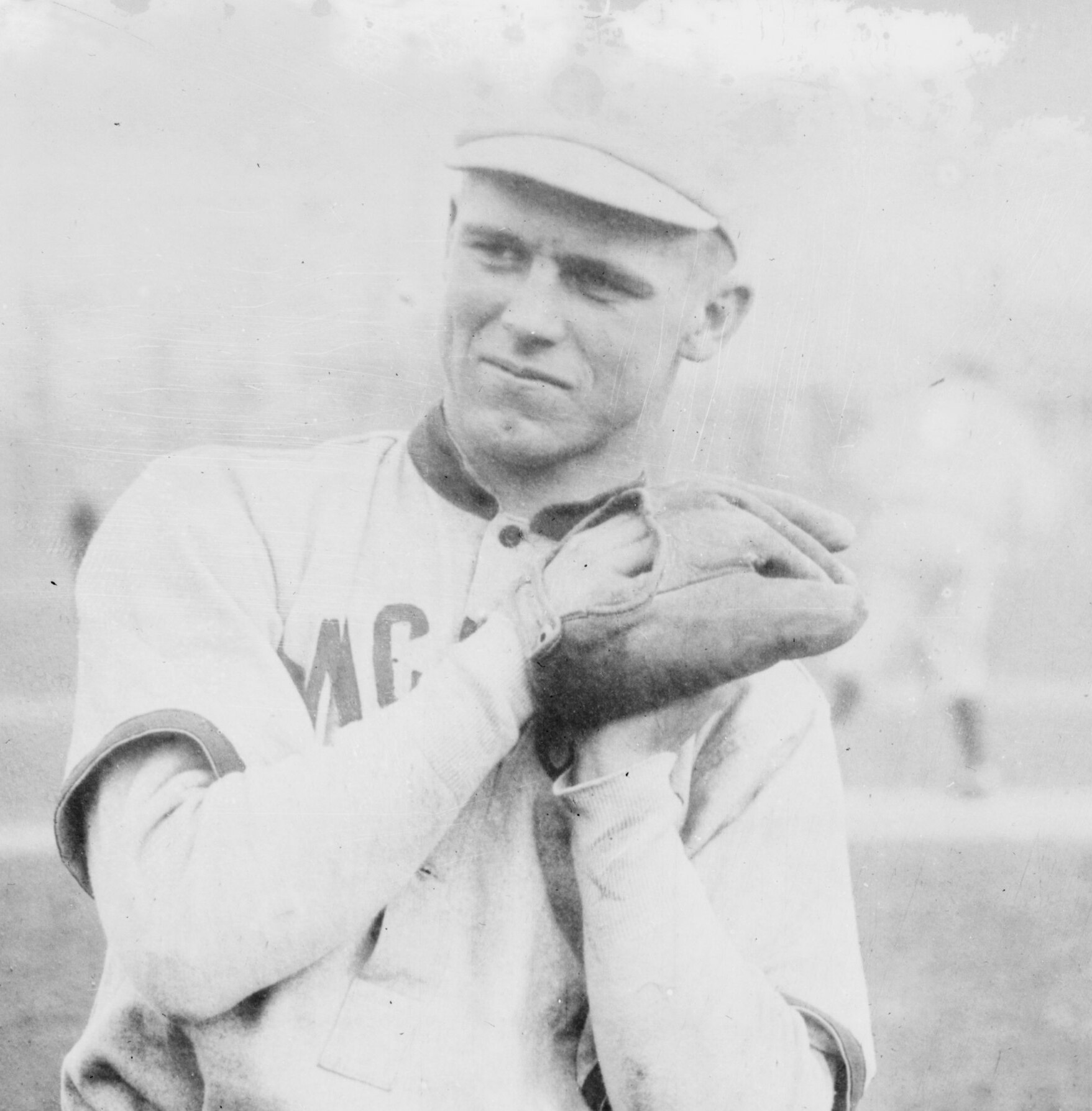
George Sisler

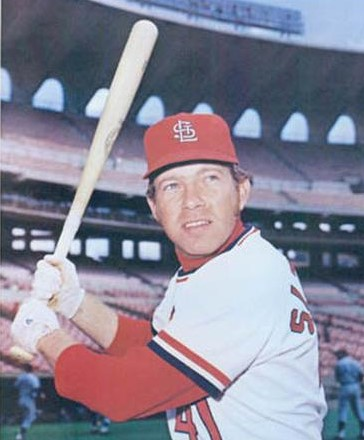
Ted Sizemore

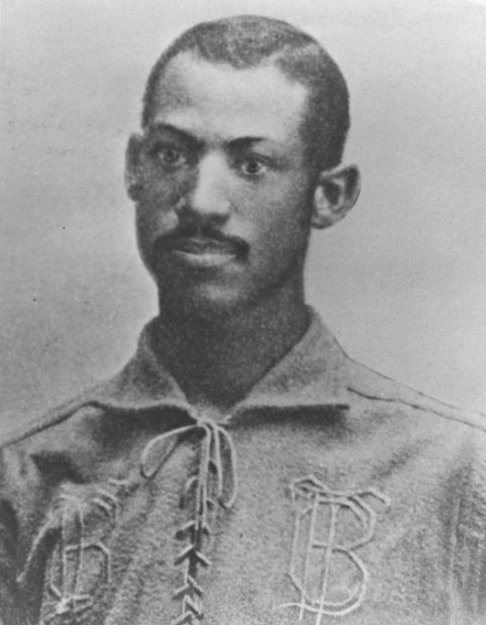
Moses Fleetwood Walker

- Jim Abbott, 1989, one-handed major-league baseball pitcher for California Angels and New York Yankees
- Pete Appleton, pianist and band leader; opted for a baseball career after graduating from the University of Michigan
- Steve Boros, former Detroit Tigers infielder
- Jim Burton, former Boston Red Sox pitcher
- Mike Cervenak, former MLB infielder
- Danny Fife, former Major League Baseball player
- Bill Freehan, former All-Star and Golden Glove catcher, Detroit Tigers
- Elmer Gedeon, Major League Baseball player killed in action in World War II
- Charlie Gehringer, Baseball Hall of Fame second baseman
- Rick Hahn, general manager of the Chicago White Sox
- Drew Henson, played NFL football and MLB baseball
- Steve Howe, former MLB pitcher
- Scott Kamieniecki, former MLB pitcher
- Henry Killilea (1863–1929), one of the five men who founded baseball's American League as a major league in 1899
- Barry Larkin, 1986, former Cincinnati Reds baseball player, 1995 National League MVP, Baseball Hall of Fame
- Chick Lathers, former MLB infielder
- Doc Lavan, former MLB infielder
- Rick Leach, former MLB outfielder
- Don Lund (born 1923), former backup outfielder in Major League Baseball, played for the Brooklyn Dodgers, St. Louis Browns and Detroit Tigers
- Elliott Maddox (born 1947), won the 1967 Big Ten batting title with a .467 average; former player for six MLB teams
- Mike Matheny, manager of the St. Louis Cardinals
- Hal Morris, former MLB first baseman
- Steve Ontiveros, former MLB pitcher
- Bennie Oosterbaan, former University of Michigan baseball and football player
- Slicker Parks, former Detroit Tigers pitcher
- Steve Phillips, former GM of the New York Mets, ESPN analyst
- J. J. Putz, MLB relief pitcher
- Branch Rickey, 1911, former president and general manager of the Brooklyn Dodgers who integrated Major League Baseball by signing Jackie Robinson
- Leon Roberts, former MLB baseball player
- Bill Roman, University of Michigan team captain senior year; Detroit Tigers first baseman, 1964–65, was awarded the National Medal of Technology and Innovation
- Chris Sabo, former third baseman for Cincinnati Reds
- Bobby Scales, second baseman for the Chicago Cubs
- Brian Simmons, former Major League Baseball outfielder
- George Sisler, first baseman for St. Louis Browns, member of Baseball Hall of Fame
- Ted Sizemore, former MLB infielder
- Lary Sorensen, former MLB pitcher
- Dick Wakefield, former Detroit Tigers outfielder
- Moses Fleetwood Walker, former professional baseball player in 1884; believed to be first African-American to play major-league baseball
- Geoff Zahn, former MLB pitcher
- Bill Zepp, former MLB pitcher

==== Draftees ====
Baseball draftees, by year, team and round from 2005 to 1965:

- Chris Getz, 2005, Chicago White Sox, 4th
- Clayton Richard, 2005, Chicago White Sox, 8th
- Jake Fox, 2003, Chicago Cubs, 3rd
- Rich Hill, 2002, Chicago Cubs, 4th
- Bobby Korecky, 2002, Philadelphia Phillies, 19th
- Rich Hill, 2001, California Angels, 7th
- David Parrish, 2000, New York Yankees, 1st (28th pick)
- J. J. Putz, 1999, Seattle, 6th
- Bobby Scales, 1999, San Diego, 14th
- J. J. Putz, 1998, Minnesota, 17th
- Mike Cervenak, 1998, Oakland A's, 43rd
- Kelly Dransfeldt, 1996, Texas, 2nd
- Brian Simmons, 1995, Chicago White Sox, 2nd
- Heath Murray, 1994, San Diego, 3rd
- Derek Jeter, 1992, New York, 1st (6th overall)
- Dennis Konuszewski, 1992, Pittsburgh, 9th
- Mike Matheny, 1991, Milwaukee Brewers, 8th
- Kirt Ojala, 1990, New York Yankees, 4th
- Greg McMurtry, 1990, Detroit, 27th
- Ross Powell, 1989, Cincinnati, 3rd
- Jim Abbott, 1988, California, 1st (8th pick)
- Mike Ignasiak, 1988, Milwaukee Brewers, 8th
- Mike Gillette, 1988, Kansas City Royals, 34th
- Chris Lutz, 1988, Chicago Cubs, 43rd
- Mike Ignasiak, 1987, St. Louis, 4th
- Casey Close, 1986, New York Yankees, 7th
- Hal Morris, 1986, New York Yankees, 8th
- Scott Kamieniecki, 1986, New York Yankees, 14th (& 1985 by Brewers − 16th)
- Barry Larkin, 1985, Cincinnati, 1st (4th pick)
- Gary Wayne, 1984, Montreal, 4th
- Gary Grant, 1984, Milwaukee Brewers, 16th
- Chris Sabo, 1983, Cincinnati, 2nd
- Gary Wayne, 1983, Oakland, 23rd
- Steve Ontiveros, 1982, Oakland, 2nd
- Jim Paciorek, 1982, Milwaukee Brewers, 8th
- Jim Paciorek, 1981, Cleveland, 14th
- Mark Clinton, 1981, Houston, 17th
- Rick Leach, 1979, Detroit, 1st (13th pick)
- Steve Howe, 1979, Los Angeles, 1st (16th pick)
- Steve Perry, 1979, Los Angeles, 1st (25th pick)
- Lary Sorensen, 1976, Milwaukee Brewers, 8th
- Tom Lundstedt, 1970, Chicago Cubs, 1st
- Geoff Zahn, 1968, Los Angeles, 5th
- Elliott Maddox, 1968, Detroit, 1st
- Geoff Zahn, 1967, Boston, 5th
- Bill Zepp, 1967, Boston, 7th
- Keith Spicer, 1967, Minnesota, 18th
- Geoff Zahn, 1967, Detroit, 2nd
- Bob Reed, 1966, Washington, 2nd
- Ted Sizemore, 1966, Los Angeles, 15th
- Cazzie Russell, 1966, Kansas City A's, 27th
- Geoff Zahn, 1966, Chicago White Sox, 34th
- Bob Reed, 1966, Detroit, 2nd
- Bill Zepp, 1966, Detroit, 8th
- Bob Reed, 1965, Detroit, 4th
- Bill Zepp, 1965, Milwaukee Braves, 33rd
- Leon Roberts, ????, Detroit, 10th

=== Basketball (men's) ===
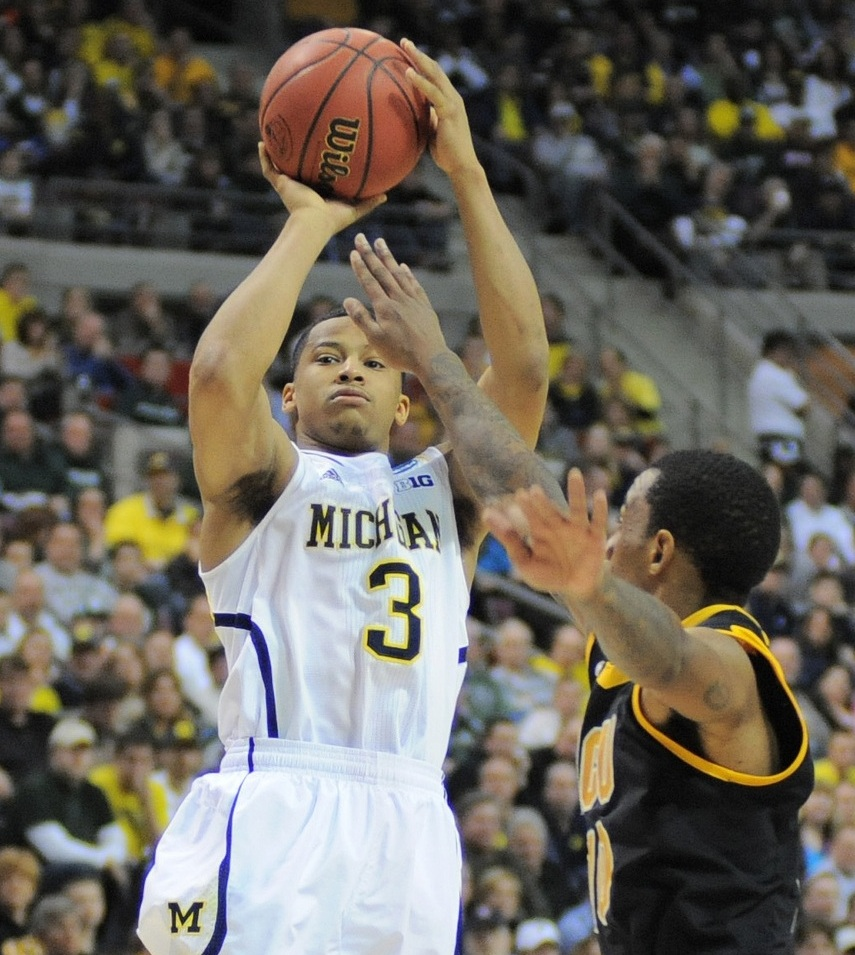
Trey Burke

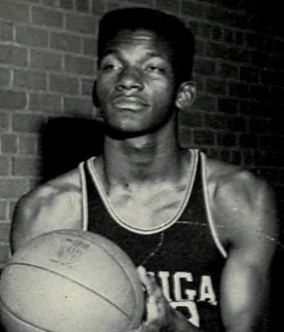
M. C. Burton Jr.

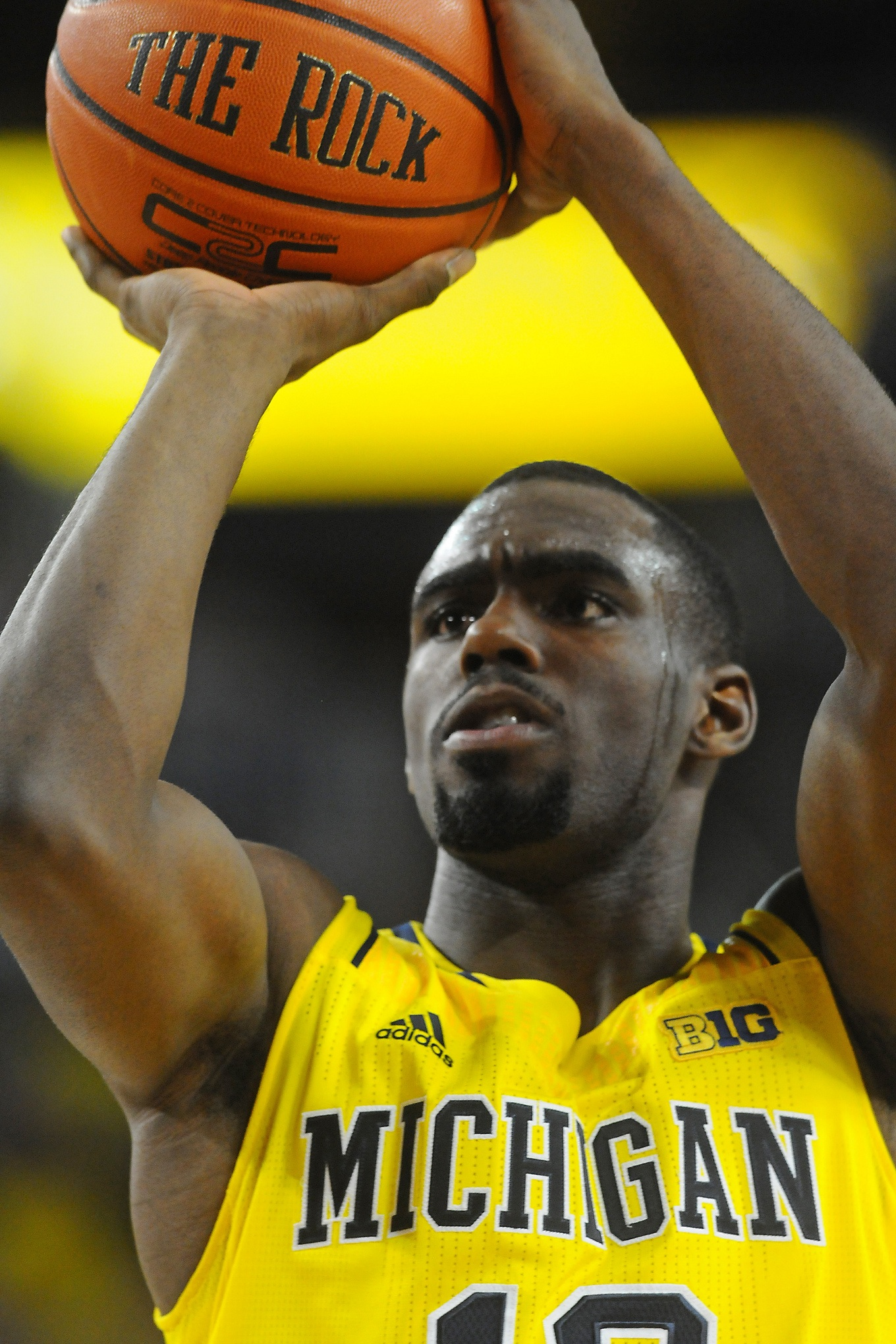
Tim Hardaway Jr.

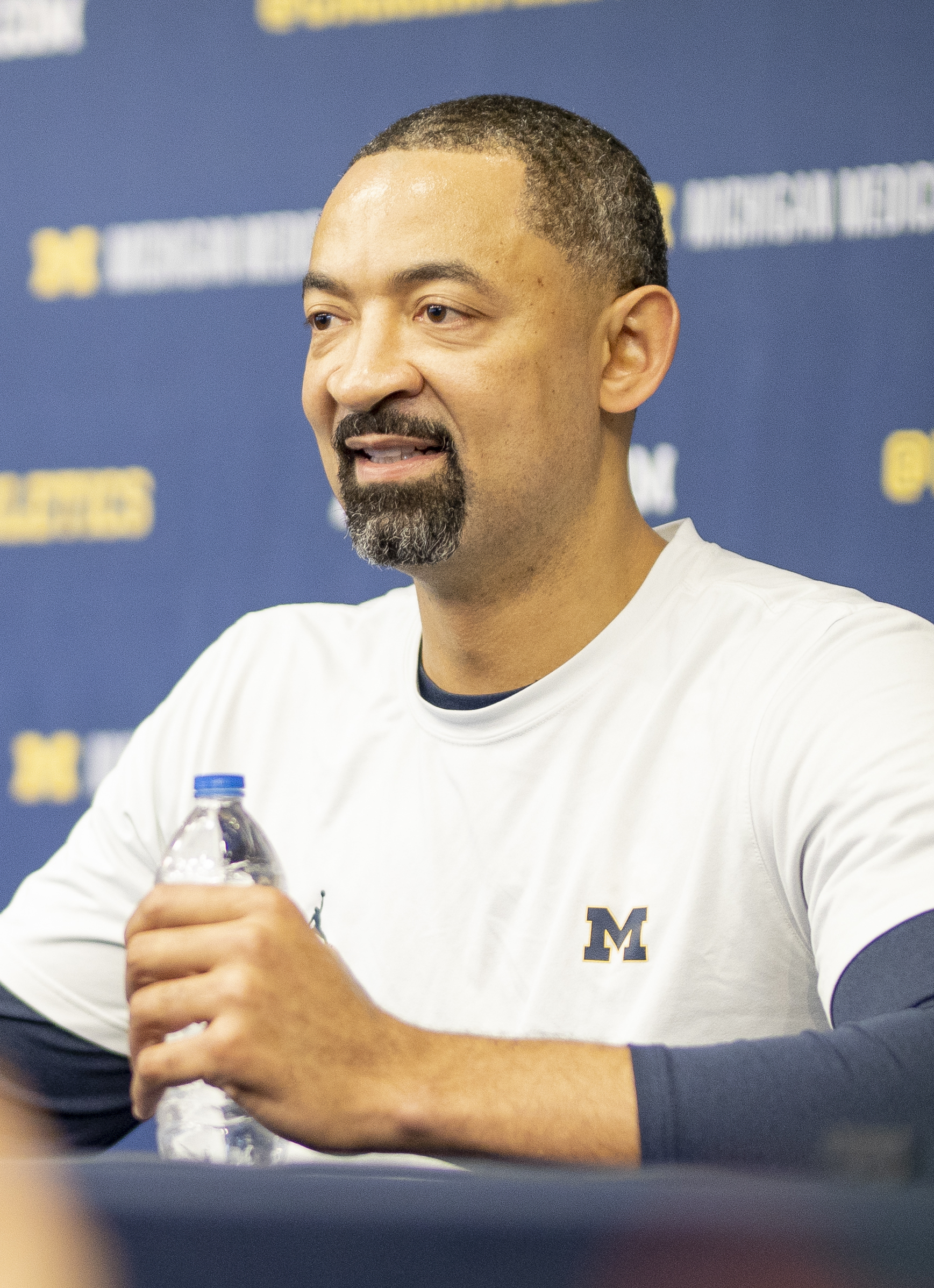
Juwan Howard

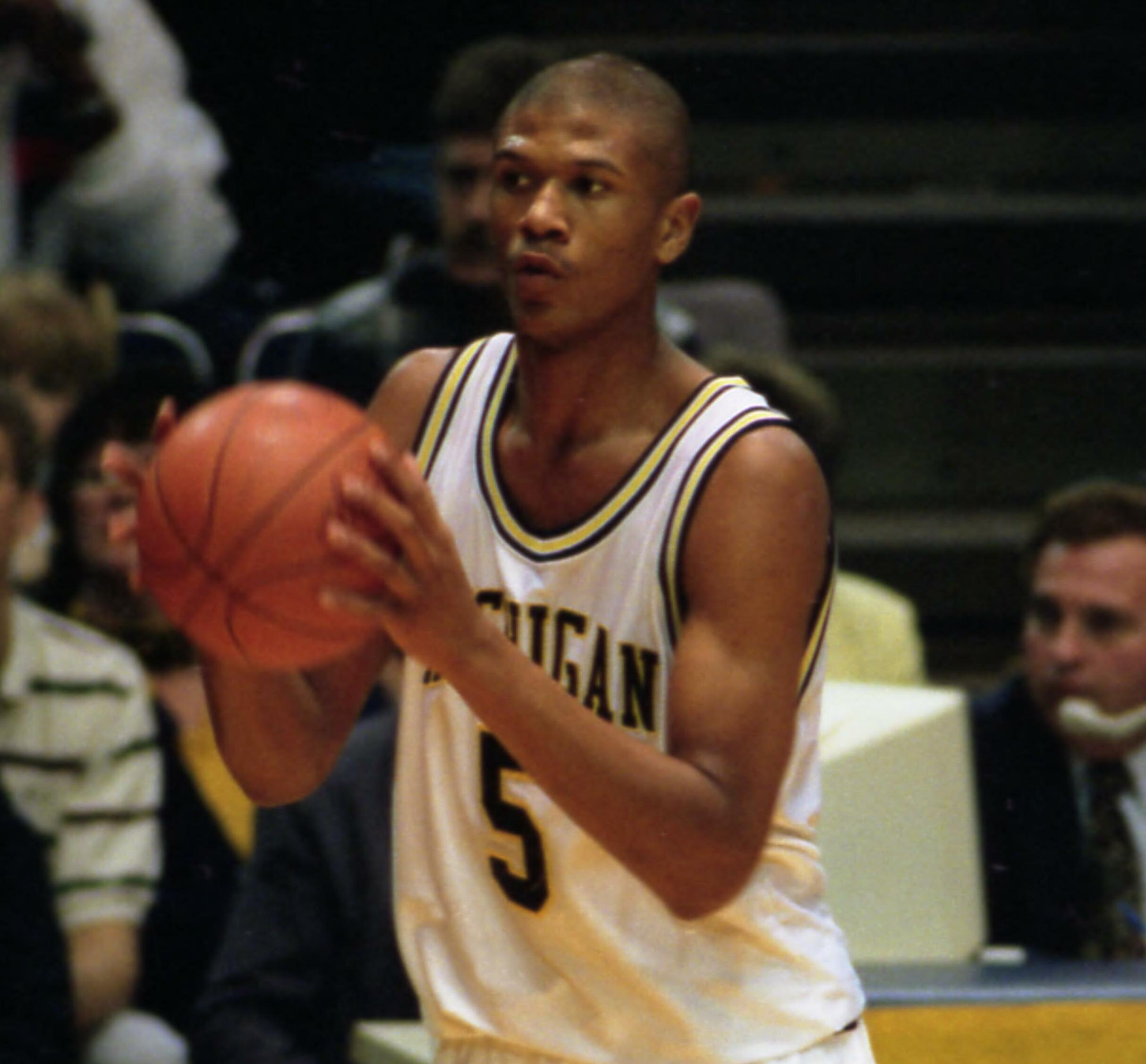
Jalen Rose

- Muhammad-Ali Abdur-Rahkman, played 2014–18, second all-time UM men's basketball player in games played (144)
- Lester Abram, played 2002–07, first three-time UM men's basketball captain
- Joey Baker, played 2022–2023, professional basketball player
- Maceo Baston, played 1994–97, basketball player
- Max Bielfeldt, played 2011–15, UM men's basketball Sixth Man of the Year his senior season (2014–15)
- LaVell Blanchard, played 1999–2003, Big Ten Conference Men's Basketball Freshman of the Year in 2000 and the first UM men's basketball player to lead the team in scoring an rebounding for four straight seasons
- Ignas Brazdeikis, played 2018–19, Big Ten Conference Men's Basketball Freshman of the Year and finalist for the Karl Malone Award in 2019
- Wayman Britt, played 1972–76, UM men's basketball annual "Outstanding Defensive Player" is named for Britt
- Chaundee Brown Jr., played 2020–2021, professional basketball player
- Bill Buntin, played 1963–65, All-American, U-M record with 58 double-doubles
- Trey Burke, played 2012–13, professional basketball player
- M. C. Burton Jr., played 1956–59, named All-America, All-Big Ten and team MVP during his senior season; turned down NBA contract offer from the Detroit Pistons to continue his studies at UM and earned his medical doctorate in 1963; member of the UM Hall of Honor
- Demetrius Calip, played 1987–91, member of UM team that captured the 1989 NCAA Division I Championship and led all UM players in scoring during his senior season (20.5 PPG)
- John Clawson, played 1963–66, member of two UM teams that made it to the NCAA Final Four and represented the United States men's national basketball team during the 1967 FIBA World Championship, 1967 Pan American Games and the 1968 Summer Olympics, being awarded a gold medal in the latter two events
- Jamal Crawford, played 1999–2000, professional basketball player
- David DeJulius (born 1999), player for Maccabi Tel Aviv of the Israeli Basketball Premier League
- Hunter Dickinson, played 2020–23, named Big Ten Freshman of the Year and a second-team All-American in 2021 as well as First-team All-Big Ten in 2021 and 2023
- Stu Douglass (born 1990), American-Israeli basketball player for the Israeli team Maccabi Ashdod
- Henry Hallowell Farquhar, played 1908–09, was a member of UM's first basketball team, leading them in scoring that season with 48 points
- Gary Grant, played 1984–88, All-American 1987–88, professional, #15 draft pick to Seattle SuperSonics
- Rickey Green, played 1975–77, first-team All-American and runner-up for the Naismith College Player of the Year in 1977
- George Haggarty, played 1922–25, leading scorer of the U-M men's basketball team his junior and senior season
- Tim Hardaway Jr., played 2010–13, first-team All-Big Ten (2013)
- Frank Harrigan, played 1924–27, first player in Michigan basketball history to score over 100 points in three consecutive seasons
- Manny Harris, played 2007–09, professional basketball player
- Juwan Howard, played 1991–93, "Fab Five" member, professional basketball player
- Phil Hubbard, played 1975–79, won a gold medal as member of US men's basketball team during the 1976 Summer Olympics; his number 35 was retired by the U-M men's basketball team in 1989 and was inducted to the U-M Hall of Honor in 1992
- Ray Jackson, played 1991–94, "Fab Five" member, former professional basketball player
- Jimmy King, played 1991–94, "Fab Five" member, former professional basketball player
- C. J. Kupec, played 1972–75, first U-M men's basketball player named team captain in consecutive seasons
- Caris LeVert, played 2012–16, named the U-M's Steve Grote Hustle Award and Rudy Tomjanovich Most Improved Player in 2014
- Tony Peyton (1922–2007), last surviving member of the original Harlem Globetrotters
- Jordan Poole
- Richard Rellford (born 1964), basketball player
- Glen Rice, basketball player; Most Outstanding Player of the 1989 men's basketball Final Four; holds NCAA record for most total points in a single NCAA tournament, with 184
- Bernard Robinson, basketball player
- Rumeal Robinson, basketball player 1987–90
- Jalen Rose, played 1991–94, "Fab Five" member, professional basketball player
- Cazzie Russell, played 1964–66, basketball player
- Maurice Taylor, basketball player
- Rudy Tomjanovich, played 1966–70, basketball player and coach
- John Townsend, played 1936–38, All-American
- Robert Traylor, basketball player
- Franz Wagner, played 2019–2021, professional basketball player
- Moritz Wagner, played 2015–2018, professional basketball player
- Chris Webber, played 1991–93, "Fab Five" member, professional basketball player, first overall pick in the 1993 NBA Draft
- Danny Wolf, played 2024–2025, professional basketball player

=== Basketball (women's) ===
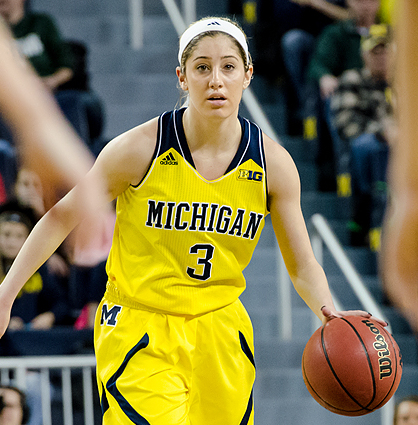
Katelynn Flaherty

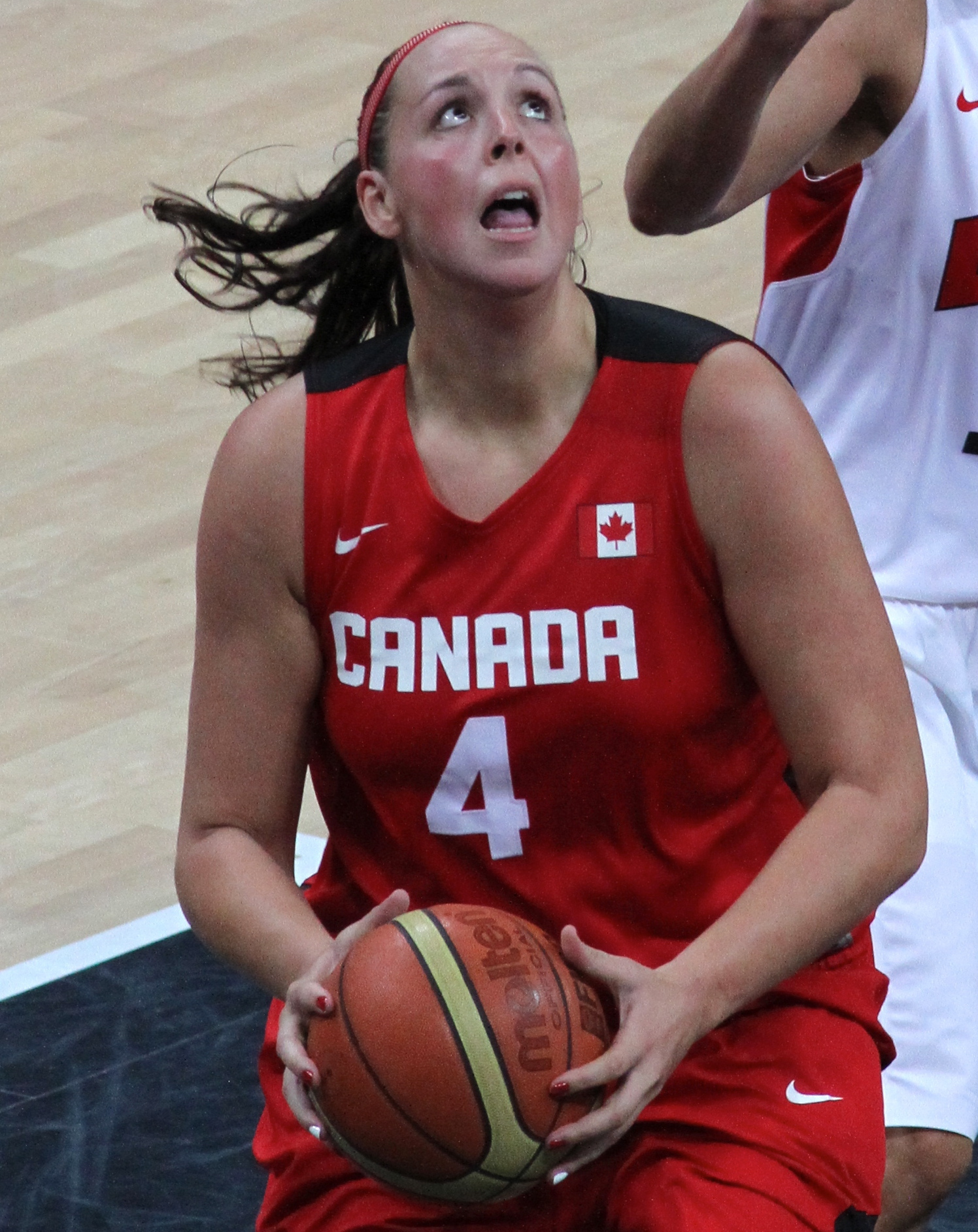
Krista Phillips

- Trish Andrew (born c. 1971), UM record holder for rebounds and blocks
- Leigha Brown (born 2000), one of five UM players to surpass 1,000-plus points and 300-plus assists
- Vonnie DeLong [née Thompson] (born 1965), UM women's basketball season leader in assists (156)
- Diane Dietz, UM's 2nd all-time scoring leader with 2,076 points, set Big Ten single-game scoring record with 45 points in 1982, inducted into Athletic Hall of Honor in 1996
- Katelynn Flaherty (born 1996), all-time leading point-scorer in Michigan basketball history, man or woman, with 2,776 career-points
- Naz Hillmon (born 2000), first player in Michigan basketball history — man or woman — to have 2,000 points and 1,000 rebounds in a career
- Pollyanna Johns Kimbrough (born 1975), Jamaican-born center, led UM in scoring and rebounds three straight years, holds UM records for career shooting percentage (.552), single-season shooting percentage (.662 in the 1997–98 season), and career rebounding percentage (9.6 per game), played six season in the WNBA
- Krista Phillips (born 1988), played for Team Canada in the 2012 Summer Olympics
- Stephany Skrba (born 1987), Canadian-Serbian power forward, has played professional basketball in Europe since 2006
- Jennifer Smith (born 1982), led the Big Ten Conference with an average of 21.3 points per game in 2003–04
- Stacey Thomas (born 1978), played six seasons in the WNBA
- Anne Thorius (born 1977), Danish guard; second-team All-Big Ten player in 1999 and 2000
- Phillis Wheatley Waters (1898–1973), thought to be the first African-American women's basketball player at UM

=== Football ===
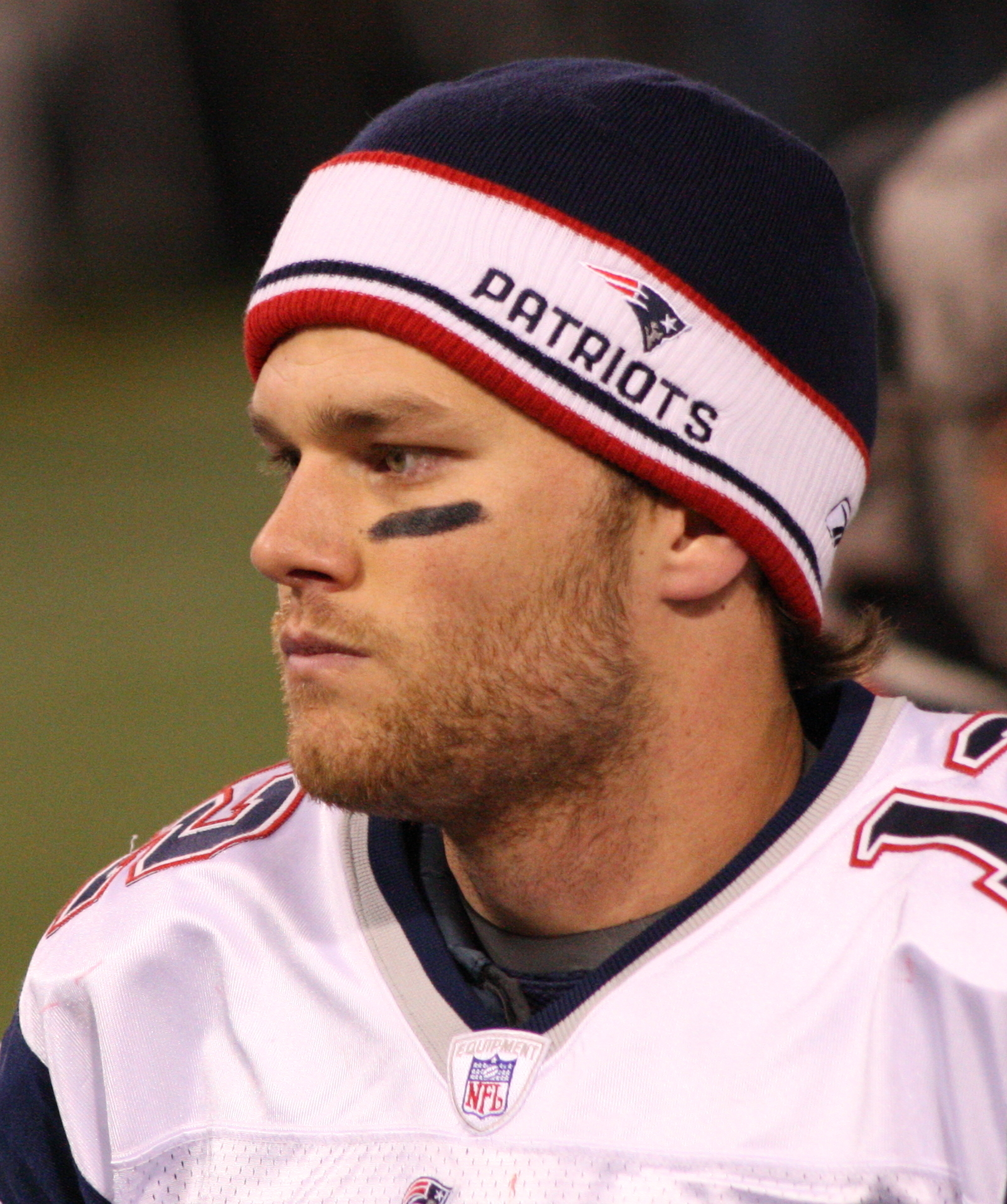
Tom Brady

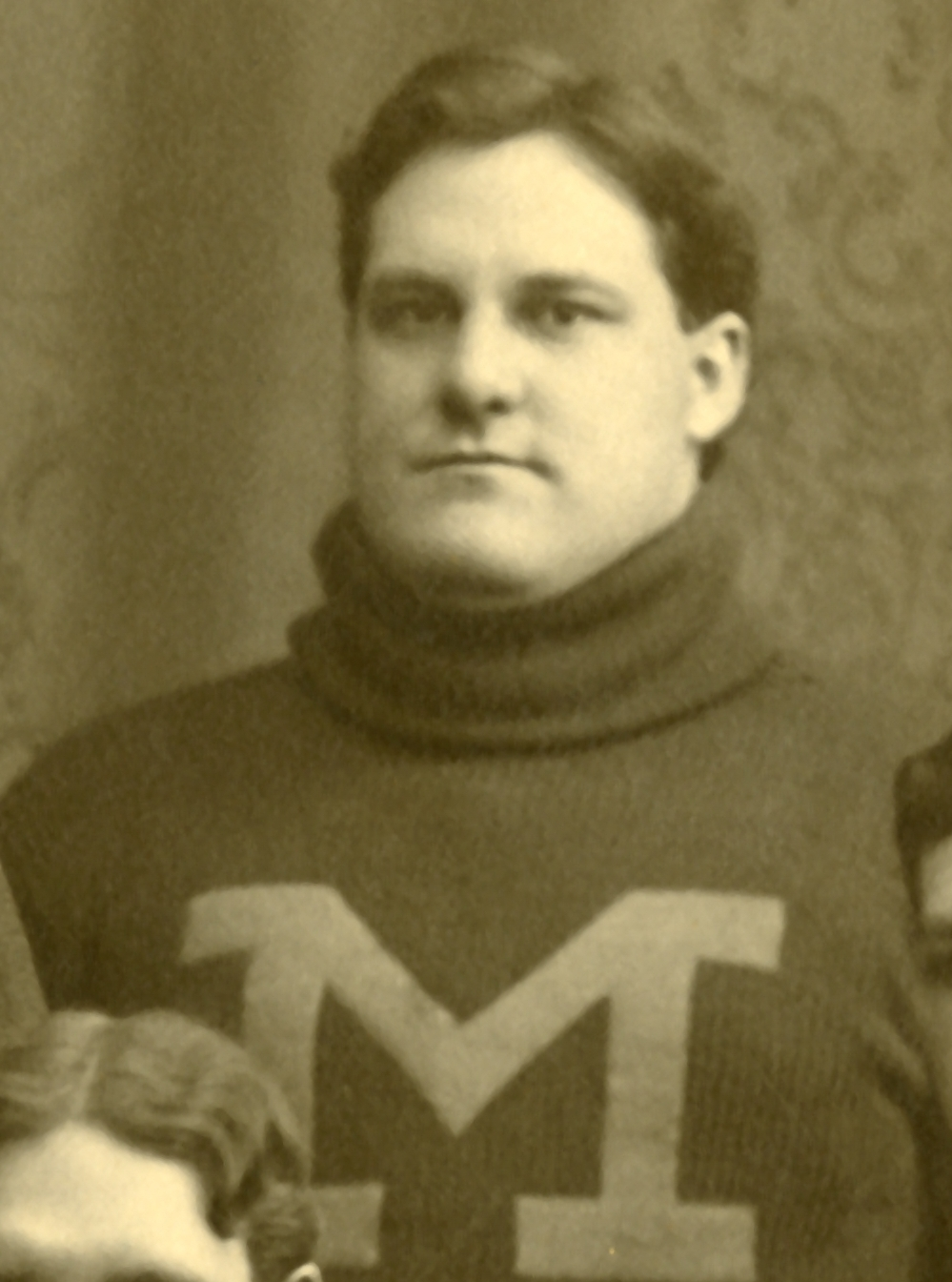
William Cunningham

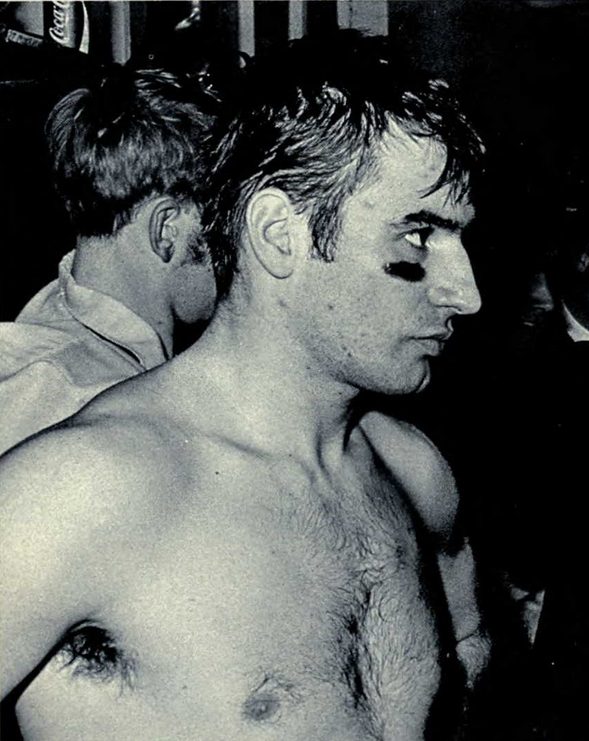
Tom Curtis

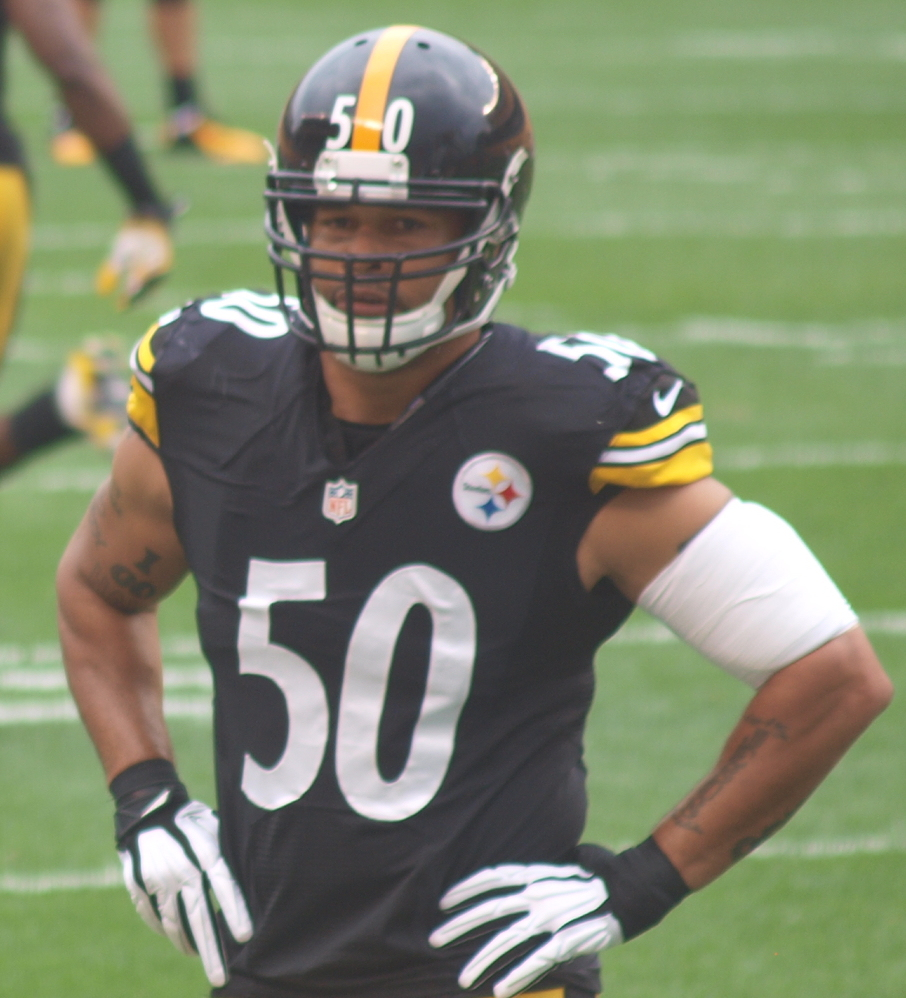
Larry Foote

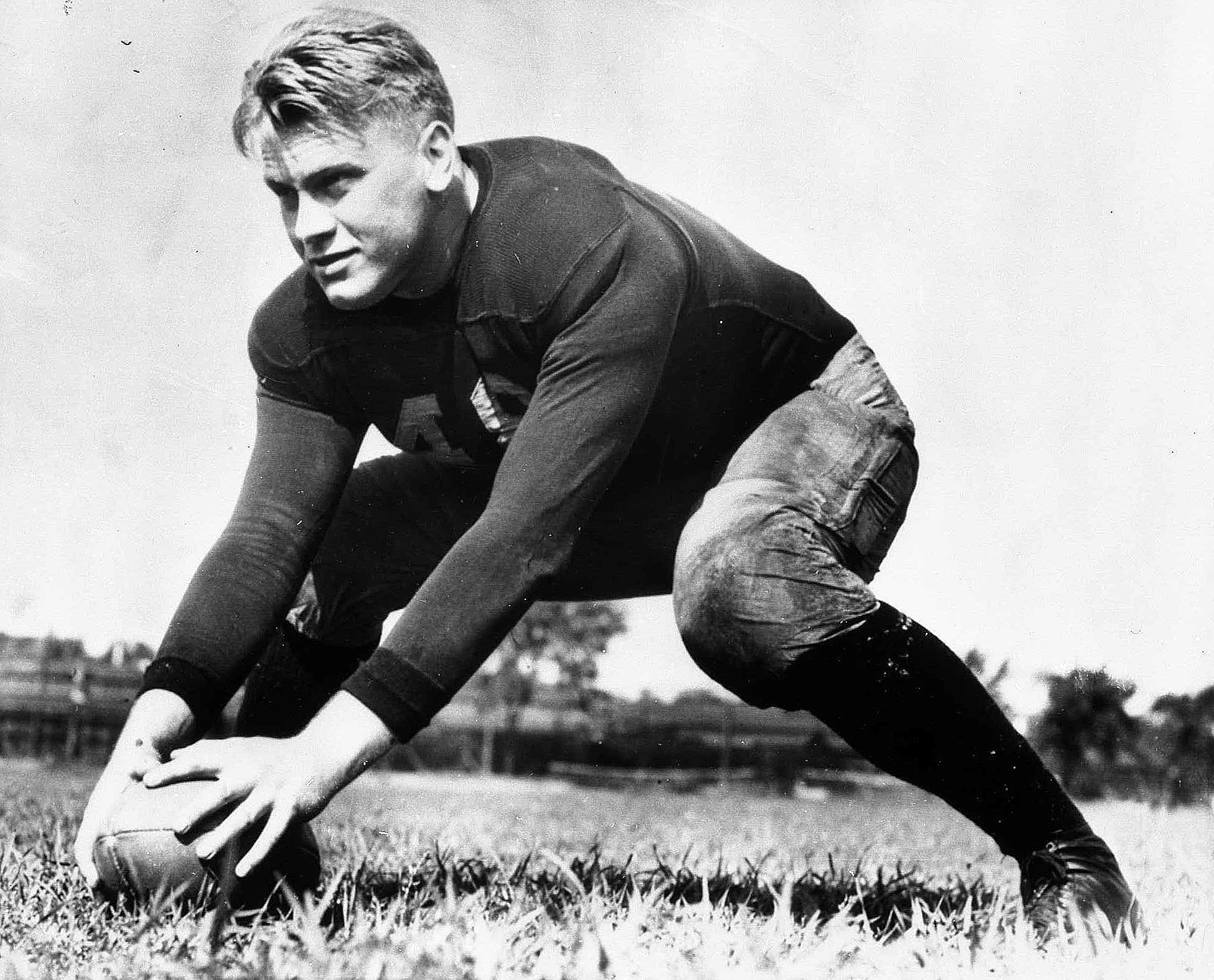
Gerald Ford

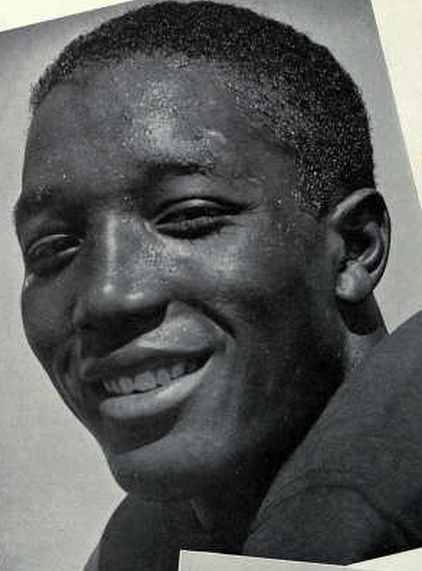
Julius Franks

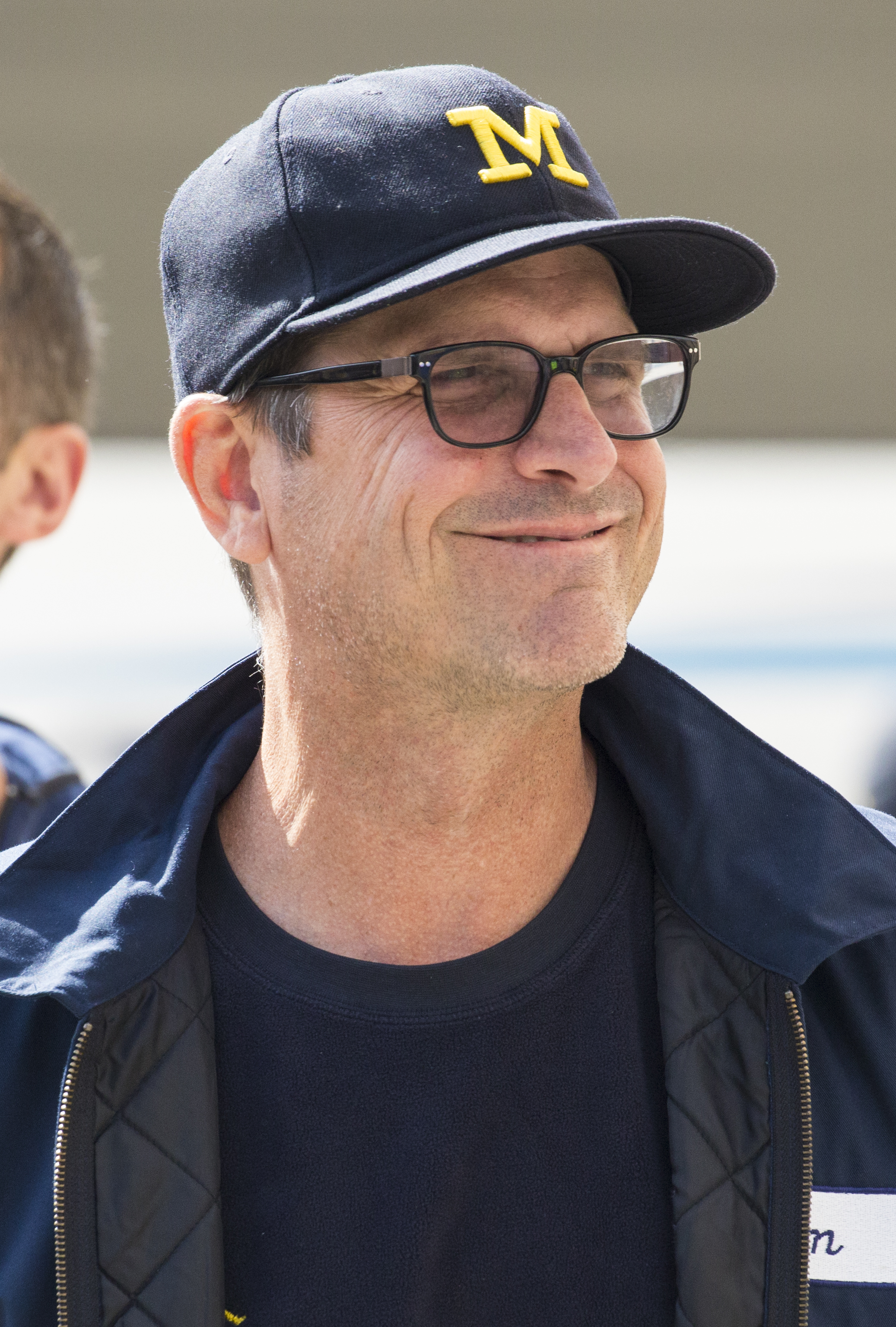
Jim Harbaugh

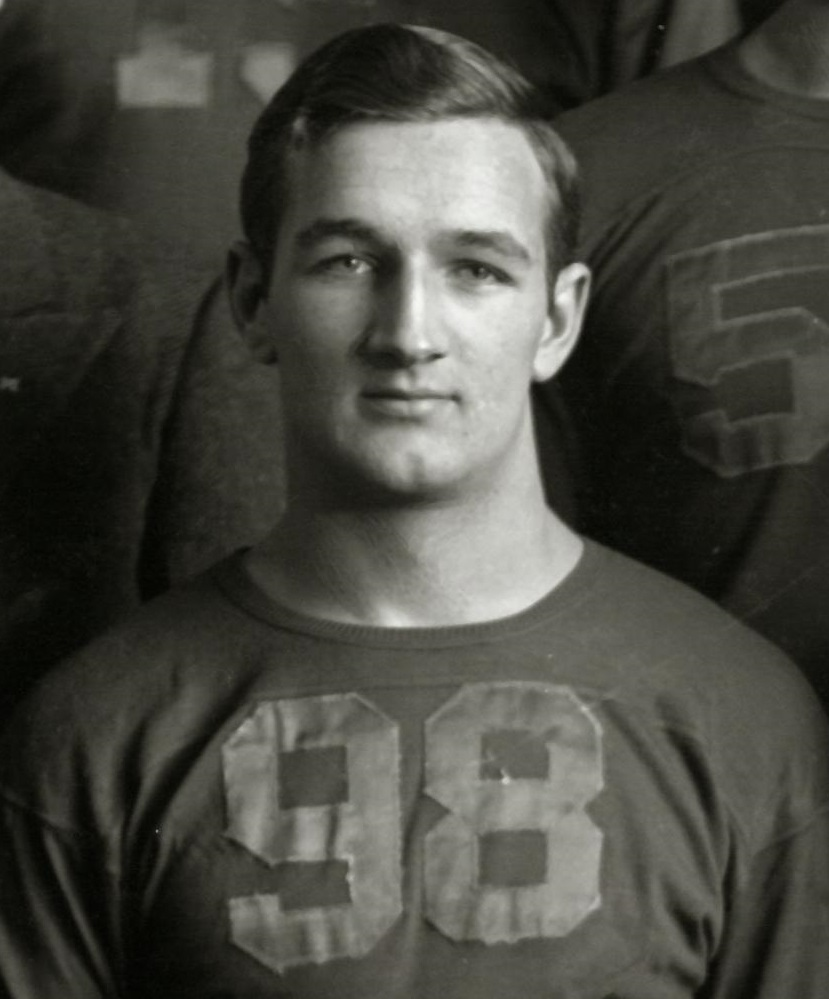
Tom Harmon

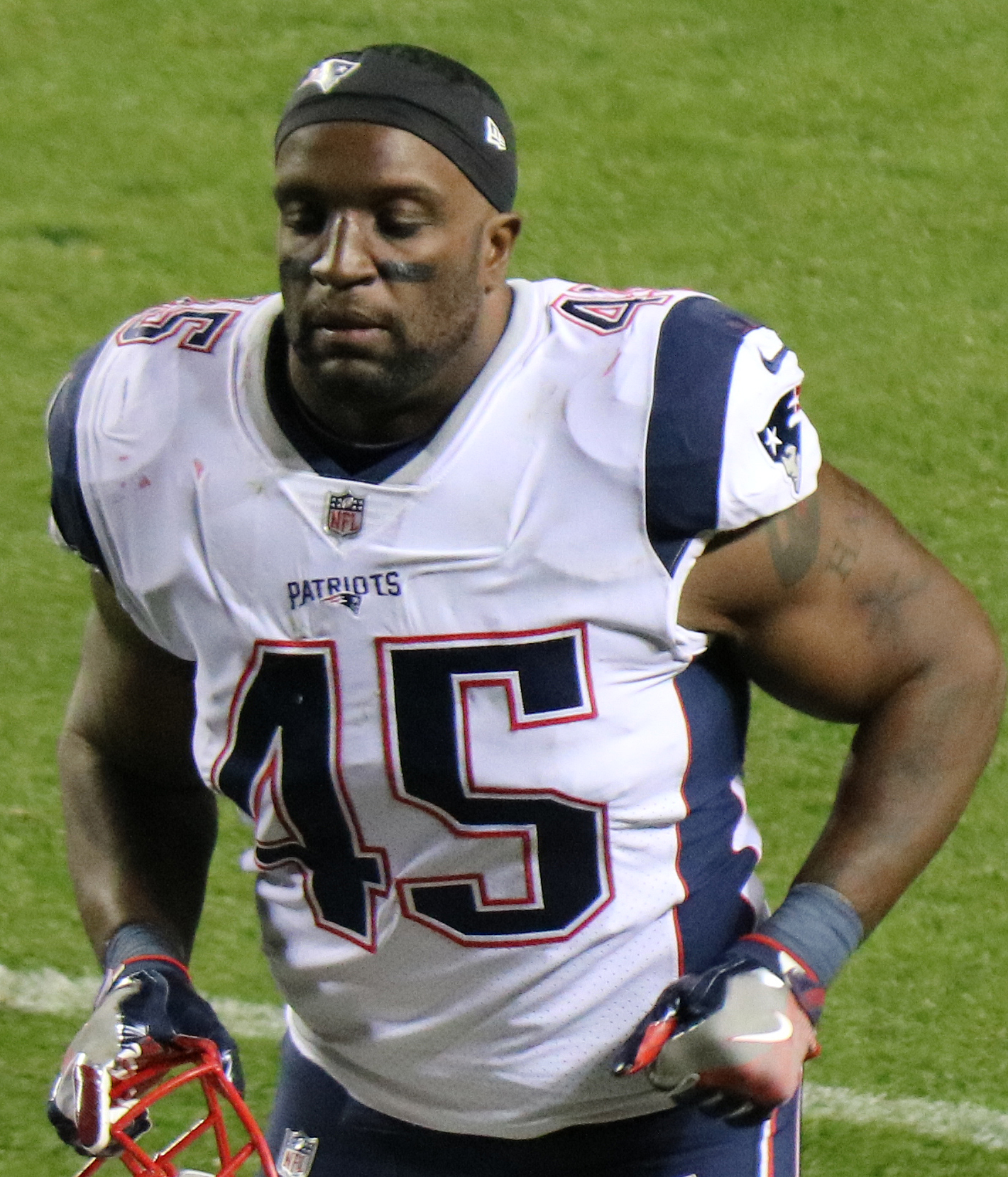
David Harris

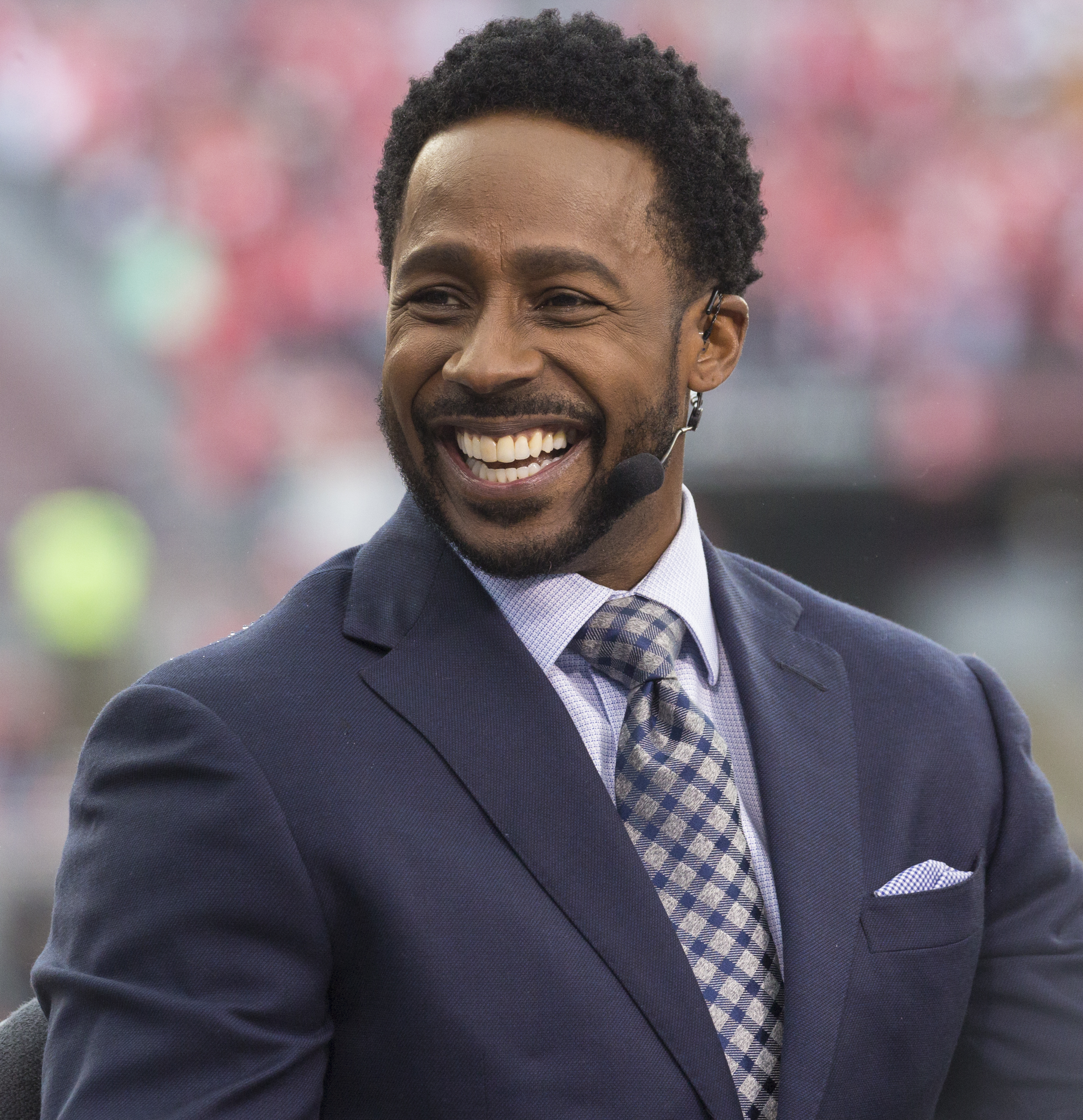
Desmond Howard

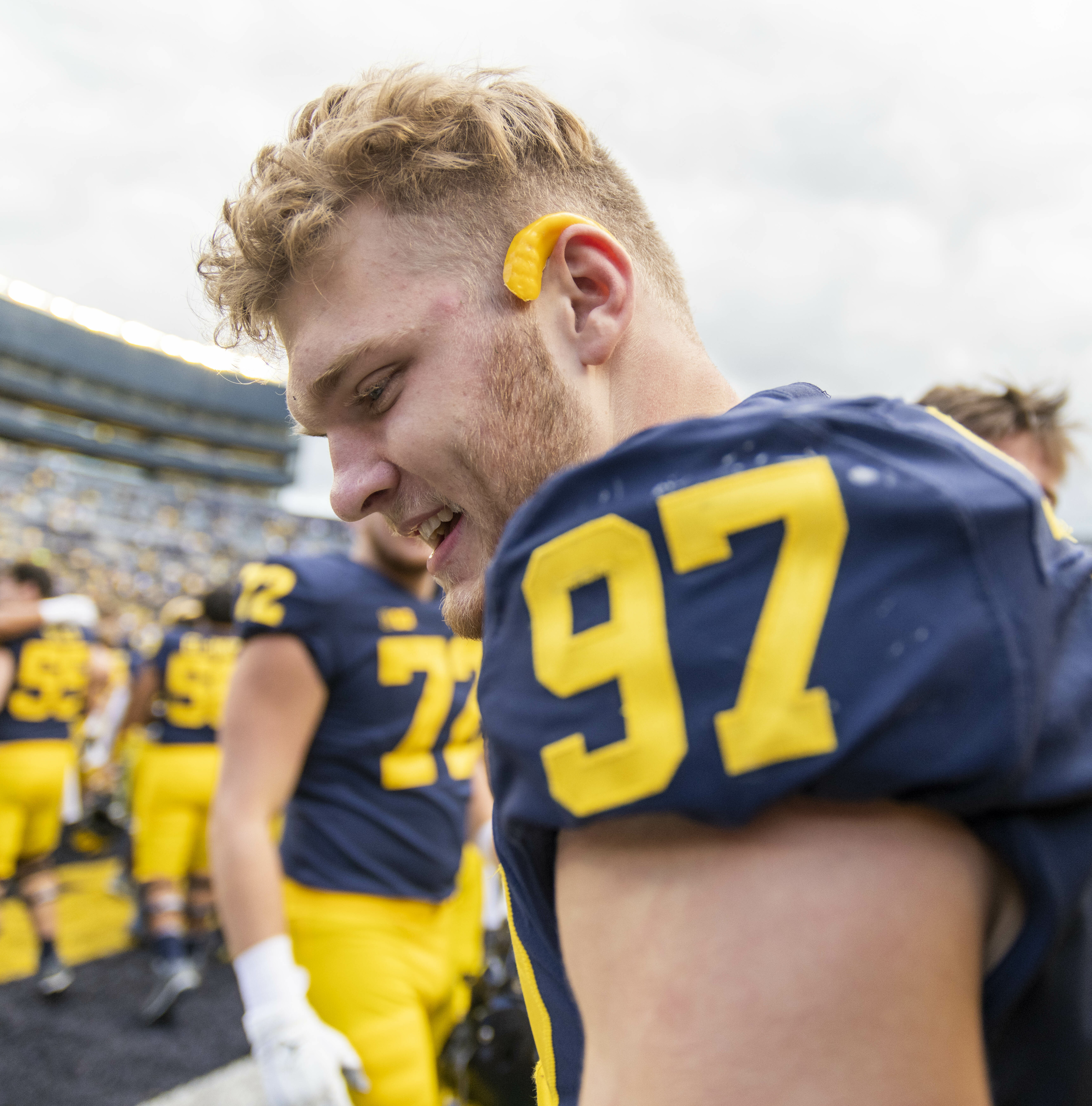
Aidan Hutchinson

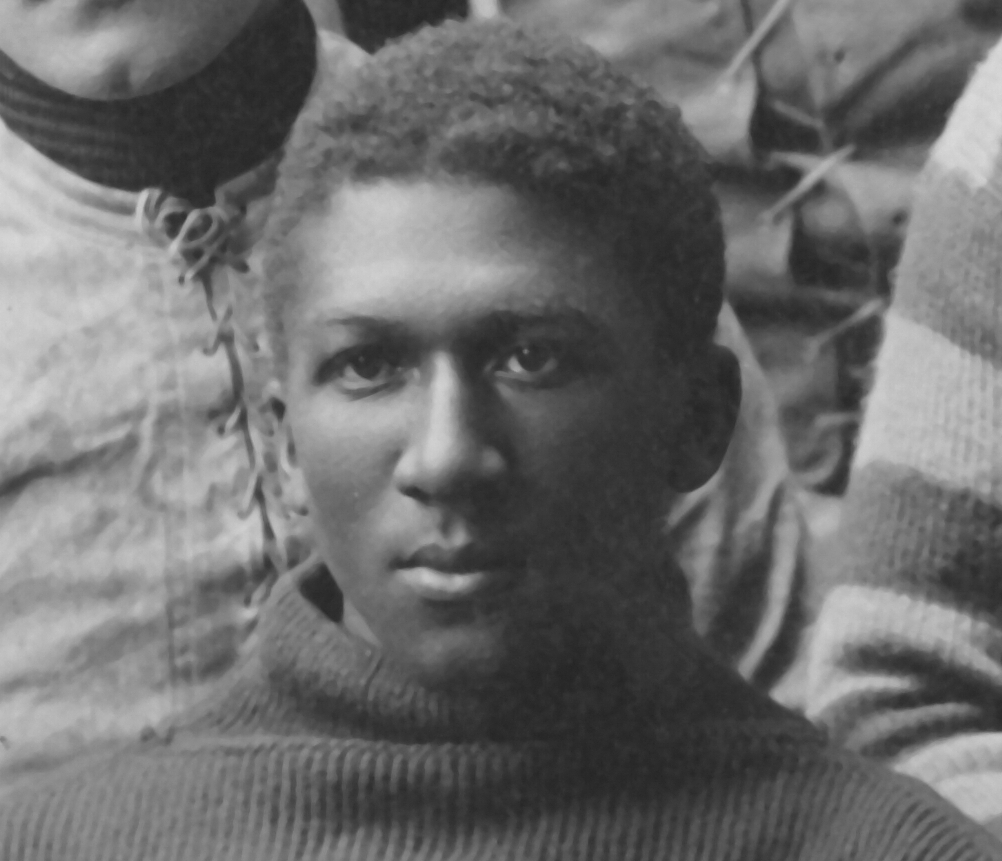
George Jewett

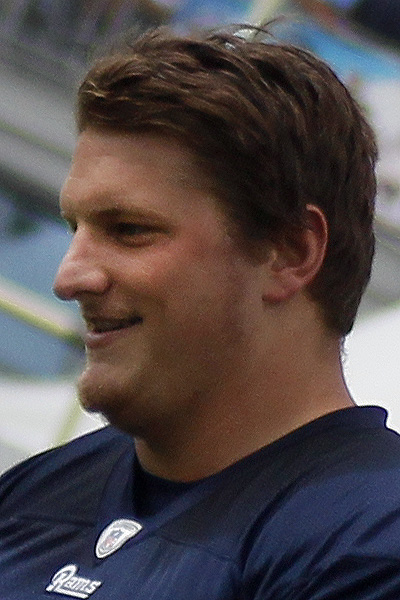
Jake Long

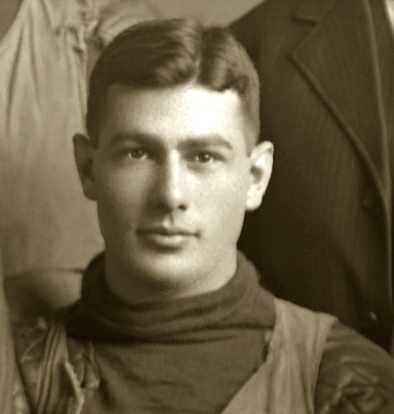
Joe Magidsohn

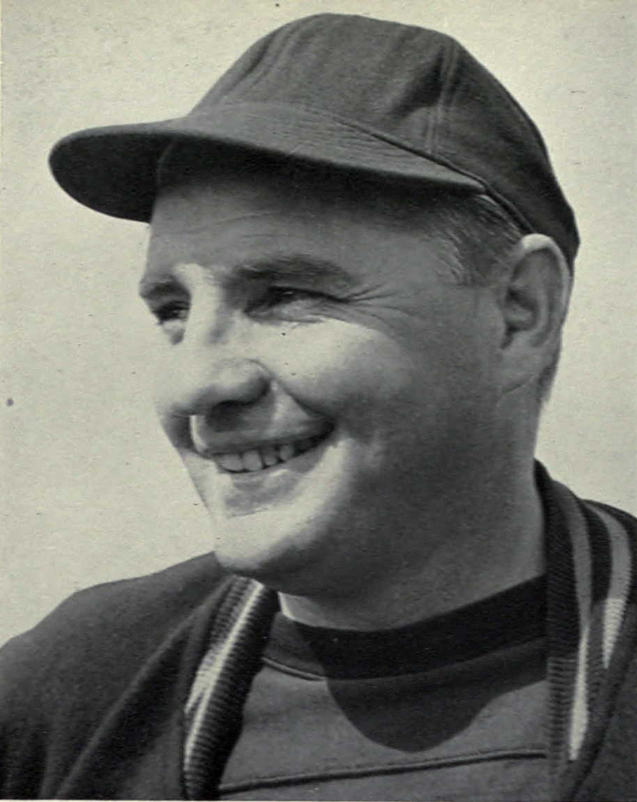
Bennie Oosterbaan

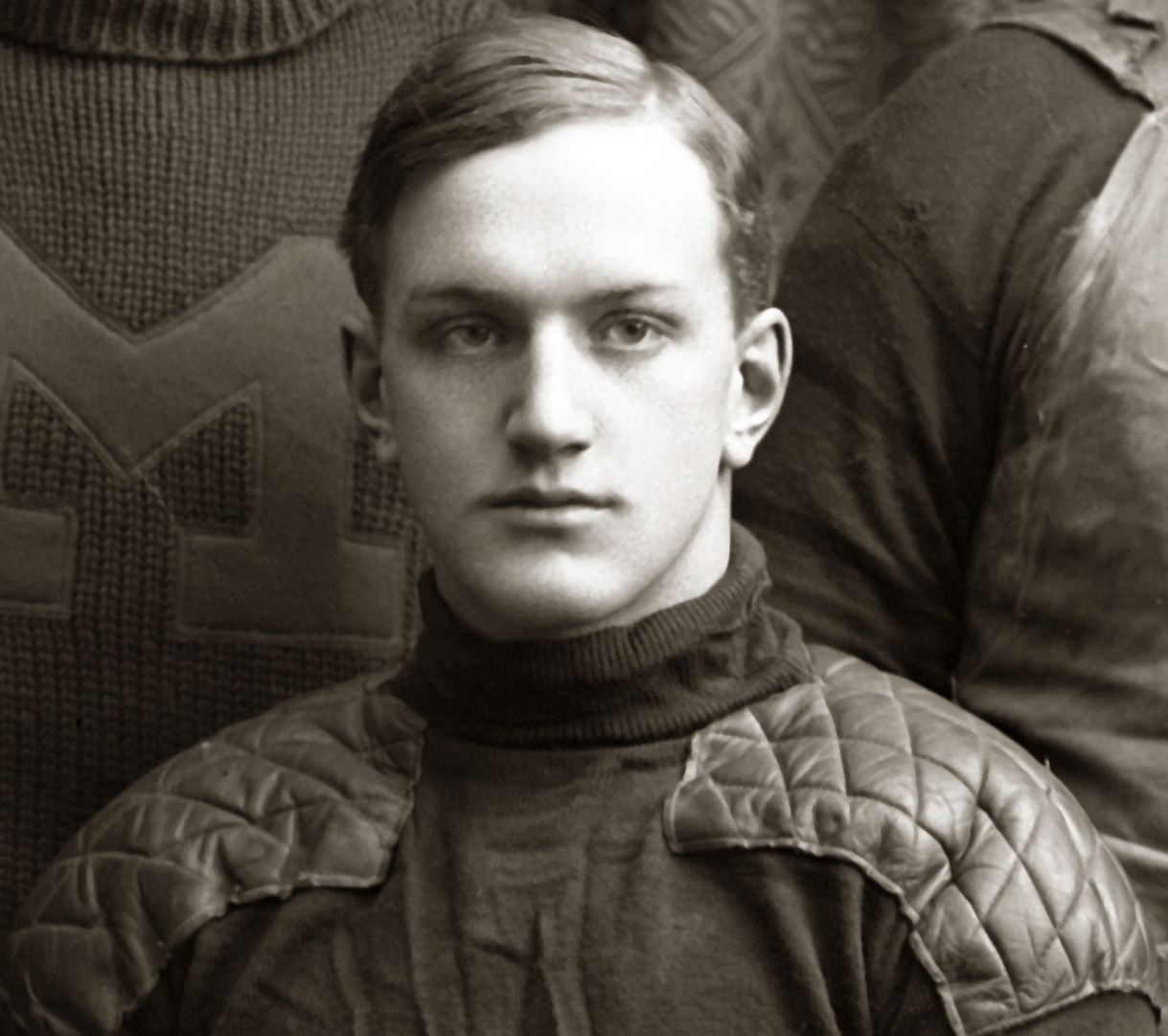
Neil Snow

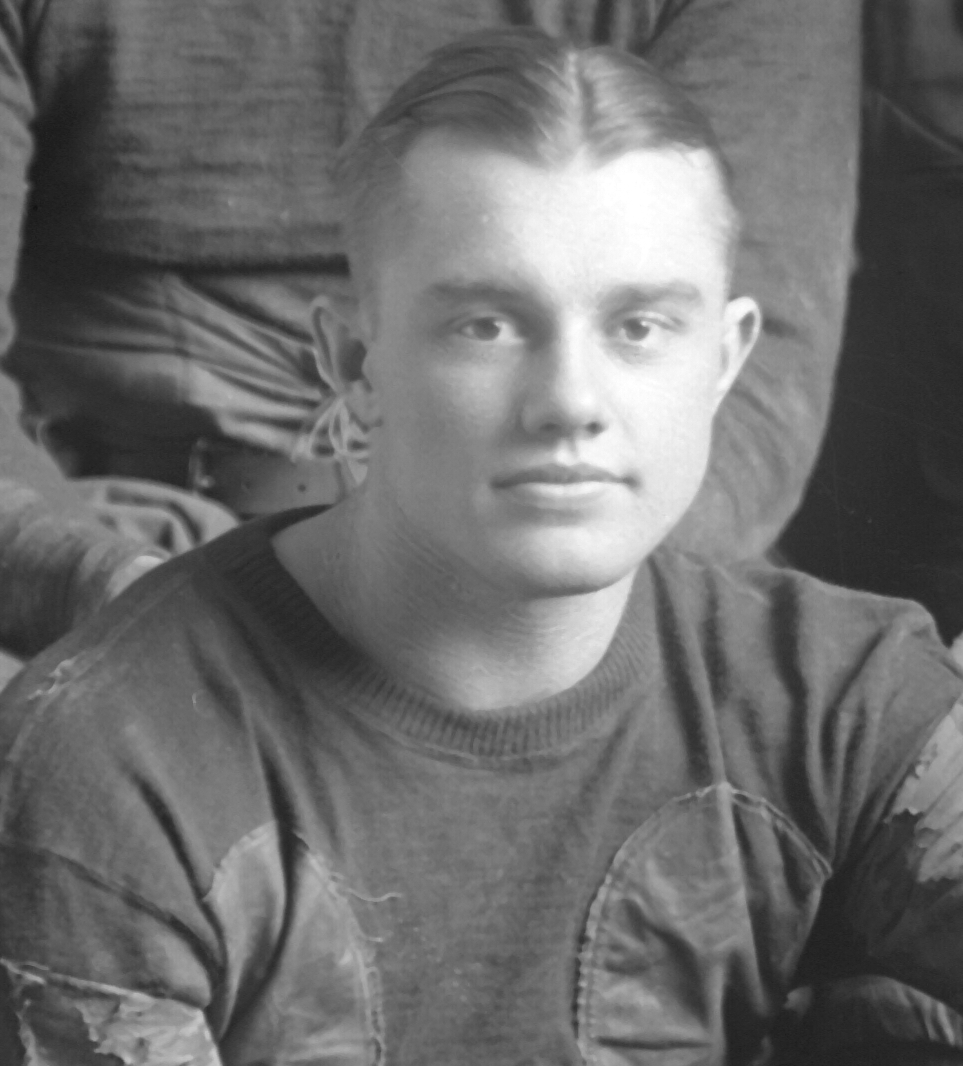
Irwin Uteritz

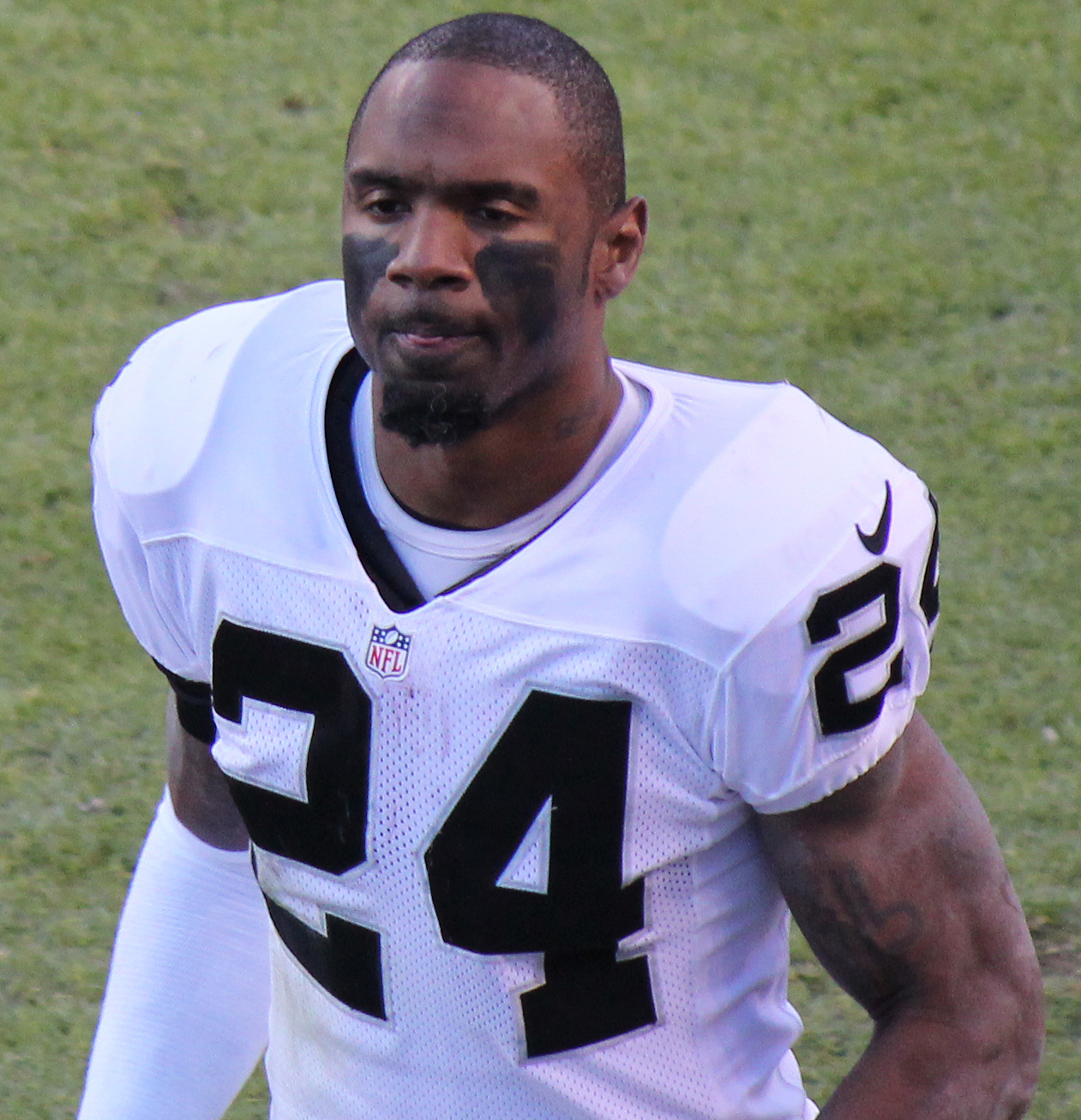
Charles Woodson

- Jeff Backus, NFL football player
- Ronald Bellamy, NFL football player
- Tim Biakabutuka, NFL football player
- Tom Brady, 2000, retired NFL quarterback, four-time Super Bowl MVP
- Alan Branch, NFL football player
- David Brandt, NFL football player
- Tony Branoff, halfback for University of Michigan, 1952-55
- Steve Breaston, NFL football player
- Dave Brown, NFL football player
- Prescott Burgess, NFL football player
- Mark Campbell, NFL football player
- Brian Carpenter, 1982, NFL football player
- Anthony Carter, NFL football player
- Todd Collins, NFL football player
- Markus Curry, NFL football player
- Dan Dierdorf, 1971, sportscaster and NFL tackle; member of Pro Football Hall of Fame
- Kevin Dudley, NFL football player
- Braylon Edwards, 2005, NFL wide receiver, 2004 winner of Fred Biletnikoff Award
- Stanley Edwards, 1982, NFL football player
- Rich Eisen, 1990, NFL Network broadcaster
- Hayden Epstein (born 1980), NFL football player
- Forest Evashevski, 1941, football player, head coach at Washington State and Iowa, member of College Football Hall of Fame
- Steve Everitt, NFL football player
- Jay Feely, NFL football player
- Bill Flemming (LS&A), sportscaster
- Larry Foote, NFL football player
- Gerald Ford, 38th president of the United States
- Benny Friedman, "Benny revolutionized football", the Bears' George Halas once said; Friedman's value was so great that Giants owner Tim Mara bought the Detroit Wolverines franchise in 1929 just so he could add him to his roster; College Football Hall of Fame and Pro Football Hall of Fame inductee
- Ian Gold, NFL football player
- Jonathan Goodwin, NFL football player
- Elvis Grbac, NFL football player
- Brian Griese, NFL football player
- James Hall, NFL football player
- Leon Hall, NFL football player
- Jim Harbaugh (class of 1986), NFL quarterback Chicago Bears (1987–1993), Indianapolis Colts (1994–1997), Baltimore Ravens (1998), San Diego Chargers (1999–2000), Detroit Lions (2001)*, Carolina Panthers (2001), former offensive consultant Western Kentucky University (1994–2001), former quarterbacks coach Oakland Raiders (2002–2003), former head coach of University of San Diego (2004–2006), former head coach of Stanford (2007–2010), former head coach of San Francisco 49ers (2011–2014), former head coach of Michigan Wolverines football (2015–2023), head coach of San Diego Chargers (2024–present)
- Tom Harmon, 1941, football player; 1940 Heisman Trophy winner and sportscaster; member of College Football Hall of Fame
- David Harris, NFL football player
- Mercury Hayes, NFL and CFL football player
- Tommy Hendricks, NFL football player
- Dwight Hicks, NFL football defensive back
- Elroy Hirsch (aka "Crazy Legs" Hirsch), football player; only Michigan athlete to letter in four sports in a single year; NFL receiver; University of Wisconsin athletic director; member of College Football Hall of Fame and Pro Football Hall of Fame
- Victor Hobson, NFL football player
- Dick Honig, college football and basketball referee
- Desmond Howard, 1992, football player, 1991 Heisman Trophy winner and Super Bowl XXXI MVP
- Aidan Hutchinson, NFL football player
- Steve Hutchinson, NFL football player
- Marlin Jackson, NFL defensive back
- Dana Jacobson (BA 1993), sportscaster
- Jon Jansen, NFL football player
- George Jewett, first African-American college football player at the University of Michigan
- Ron Johnson (BUS: BBA 1969), NFL football player
- Dhani Jones, 2000, NFL football player, host of ESPN's Timeless
- Bennie Joppru, NFL football player
- Cato June, NFL football player
- Alain Kashama, NFL football player
- Marcus Knight, NFL football player
- Ty Law, NFL football player
- Jeremy LeSueur, NFL football player
- Rob Lytle, NFL football player
- Joe Magidsohn, football All-American
- Roy Manning, NFL football player
- Tim Massaquoi, NFL football player
- John Maulbetsch, All-American halfback at Adrian College in 1911 and University of Michigan 1914 to 1916
- Earl Maves, NFL football player
- Bill Mazer (BA), TV/radio personality
- Zoltan Mesko (BUS: BBA 2009; SOK: AM 2010), NFL football player
- Les Miles, former head coach of Kansas (2019–2020); former head coach of Oklahoma State Cowboys (1995–1997), assistant coach at Oklahoma State Cowboys (1995–1997 OC/OL), former assistant coach at Colorado Buffaloes (1982–1986 OL); former assistant coach at Michigan Wolverines (1987–1994 OL), former assistant coach Dallas Cowboys (1998–2000 TE), former head coach, LSU Tigers (2005–2016)
- Jamie Morris, NFL football player
- John Navarre, NFL football player
- David M. Nelson (B.S. 1942), head football coach, athletic director, and dean of the University of Delaware
- Harry Newman, football All-American, Douglas Fairbanks Trophy as Outstanding College Player of the Year (predecessor of the Heisman Trophy), College Football Hall of Fame, NFL player
- Shantee Orr, NFL football player
- Tony Pape, NFL football player
- DeWayne Patmon, NFL football player
- Dave Pearson, NFL football player
- Chris Perry, NFL football player
- Merv Pregulman, NFL football player
- Jay Riemersma, NFL football player
- Jon Runyan, 1995, NFL football player
- Ernest Shazor, NFL football player
- Aaron Shea, NFL football player
- Greg Skrepenak, NFL football player, Luzerne County (Pennsylvania) commissioner
- Larry Stevens, NFL football player
- Tai Streets, NFL football player
- Bert Sugar (LAW: JD 1961; BUS: MBA 1961), former publisher-editor of Ring magazine
- David Terrell, NFL football player
- Anthony Thomas, NFL football player
- Amani Toomer, NFL football player
- Jerame Tuman, NFL football player
- Irv Utz, namesake of Irv Utz Stadium (dedicated in 2011) at Washington University, where he was head baseball coach; Kelley field complex was officially renamed in his honor in 2011; member of Washington University Sports Hall of Fame, coach and administrator there for more than 16 years, also Washington University's head football coach; All-American football player at the University of Michigan
- Gabe Watson, NFL football player
- Andre Weathers, NFL football player
- Tyrone Wheatley, NFL football player
- Gerald White, NFL football player
- James Whitley, NFL football player
- Stu Wilkins (born c. 1928), football player, lawyer, and businessman; played guard for the University of Michigan 1945–1948; one of the leaders behind the establishment of the Pro Football Hall of Fame in Canton
- Josh Williams, NFL football player
- Maurice Williams, NFL football player
- Eric Wilson, NFL football player
- Hugh E. Wilson, head football and baseball coach at Louisiana Tech
- Chuck Winters, CFL player, Grey Cup champion
- LaMarr Woodley, NFL football player
- Pierre Woods, NFL football player
- Charles Woodson, 1997, NFL football player and 1997 Heisman Trophy winner
- Butch Woolfolk, NFL football player
- Tracy Wolfson (BA 1997), CBS Sports reporter

==== Football: Consensus All-American ====
Michigan's Football All-Americans: 120 individual players have earned first-team All-American honors, representing 142 separate citations, including two three-time winners and eighteen two-time All-Americans.

Name, position, year

- Jake Long, OL, 2007
- Jake Long, OL, 2006
- Braylon Edwards, WR, 2004
- David Baas, OL, 2004
- Marlin Jackson, DB, 2004
- Ernest Shazor, DB, 2004
- Chris Perry, RB, 2003
- Steve Hutchinson, OL, 2000
- Charles Woodson, DB, 1997
- Jarrett Irons, LB, 1996
- Desmond Howard, WR, 1991
- Greg Skrepenak, OL, 1991
- Tripp Welborne, DB, 1990
- John Vitale, C, 1988
- Mark Messner, DL, 1988
- John Elliot, OL, 1987
- Garland Rivers, DB, 1986
- Mike Hammerstein, DL, 1985
- Brad Cochran, DB, 1985
- Anthony Carter, WR, 1981–1982
- Ed Muransky, OL, 1981
- Kurt Becker, OL, 1981
- Ron Simpkins, LB, 1979
- Mark Donahue, G, 1977
- Rob Lytle, RB, 1976
- Mark Donahue, G, 1976
- Dave Brown, DB, 1974
- Dave Gallagher, DL, 1973
- Dave Brown, DB, 1973
- Paul Seymour, T, 1972
- Randy Logan, DB, 1972
- Reggie McKenzie, G, 1971
- Mike Taylor, LB, 1971
- Dan Dierdorf, T, 1970
- Jim Mandich, E, 1969
- Tom Curtis, DB, 1969
- Jack Clancy, E, 1966
- Bill Yearby, DT, 1965
- Ron Kramer, E, 1956
- Ron Kramer, E, 1955
- Alvin Wistert, T, 1949
- Dick Rifenburg, E, 1948
- Alvin Wistert, T, 1948
- Bob Chappuis, B, 1947
- Bill Daley, B, 1943
- Albert Wistert, T, 1942
- Julius Franks, G, 1942
- Bob Westfall, B, 1941
- Tom Harmon, B, 1940
- Tom Harmon, B, 1939
- Ralph Heikkinen, G, 1938
- Francis Wistert, T, 1933
- Chuck Bernard, C, 1933
- Harry Newman, B, 1932
- Otto Pommerening, T, 1928
- Bennie Oosterbaan, E, 1927
- Bennie Oosterbaan, B, 1926
- Benny Friedman, B, 1926
- Bennie Oosterbaan, E, 1925
- Benny Friedman, B, 1925
- Jack Blott, C, 1923
- Harry Kipke, B, 1922
- John Maulbetsch, B, 1914
- Miller Pontius, B, 1913
- Stanfield Wells, E, 1910
- Stanfield Wells, G, 1910
- Albert Benbrook, G, 1909
- Adolph "Germany" Schulz, C, 1907
- Willie Heston, B, 1904
- Willie Heston, B, 1903
- Neil Snow, E, 1901
- William Cunningham, C, 1898

=== Golf ===
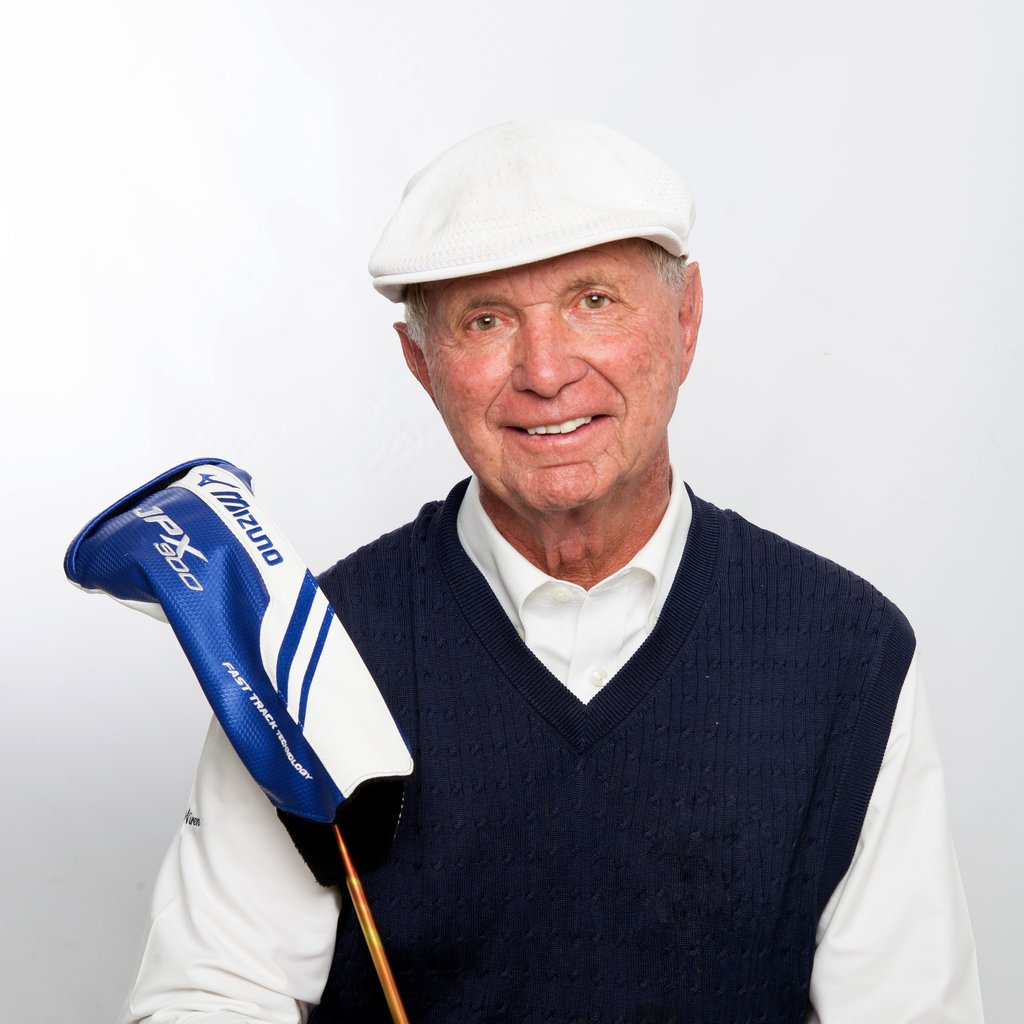
Gary Wiren

- Dave Barclay, 1947 NCAA individual golf champion
- Randy Erskine, 1970 Big Ten Conference champion; played on the PGA Tour 1974–1979
- Johnny Fischer, 1932 NCAA individual golf champion
- Chuck Kocsis, 1936 NCAA individual golf champion
- John Morse, 1980 Big Ten golf champion, has played on the PGA Tour of Australasia, European Tour, European Tour, PGA Tour and Champions Tour
- Edward I. Schalon, 1947 and 1949 Big Ten golf champion
- John Schroeder, 1968 All-American, later played on the PGA Tour and Champions Tour
- Ben Smith, 1943 Big Ten golf co-champion
- Gary Wiren, PGA Master professional instructor and SPGA golfer

=== Gymnastics ===
- Syque Caesar, represented Bangladesh at the 2012 Summer Olympics in London
- Chris Cameron, 2010 NCAA all-around champion
- Gilbert Larose, 1963 NCAA all-around champion
- Sam Mikulak, 2011 NCAA all-around champion
- Elise Ray, first-team All-American, 2002, 2003, and 2004, bronze medalist at 2000 Summer Olympics
- Beth Wymer, first-team All-American, 1992, 1993, 1994, and 1995

=== Hockey ===
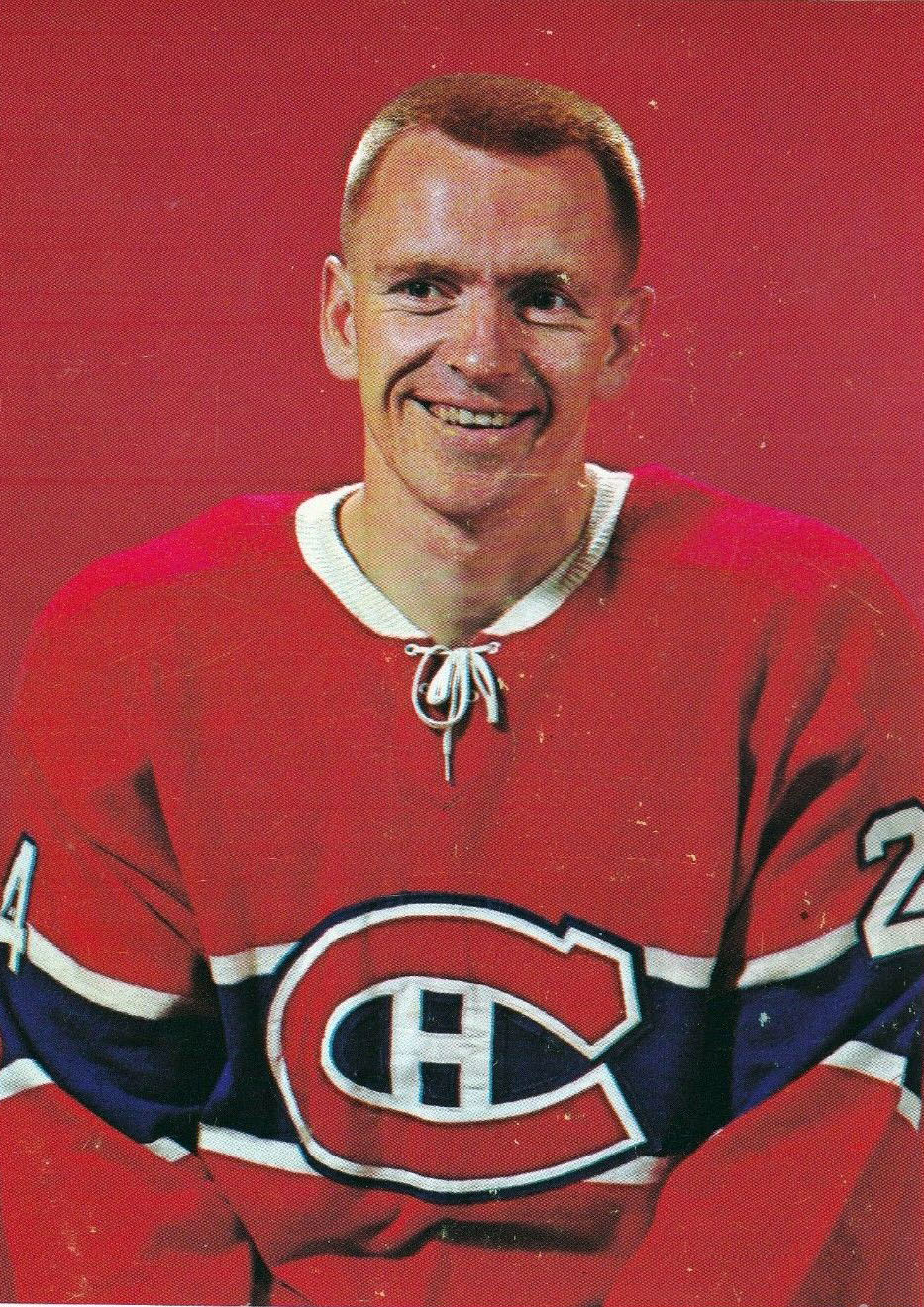
Red Berenson

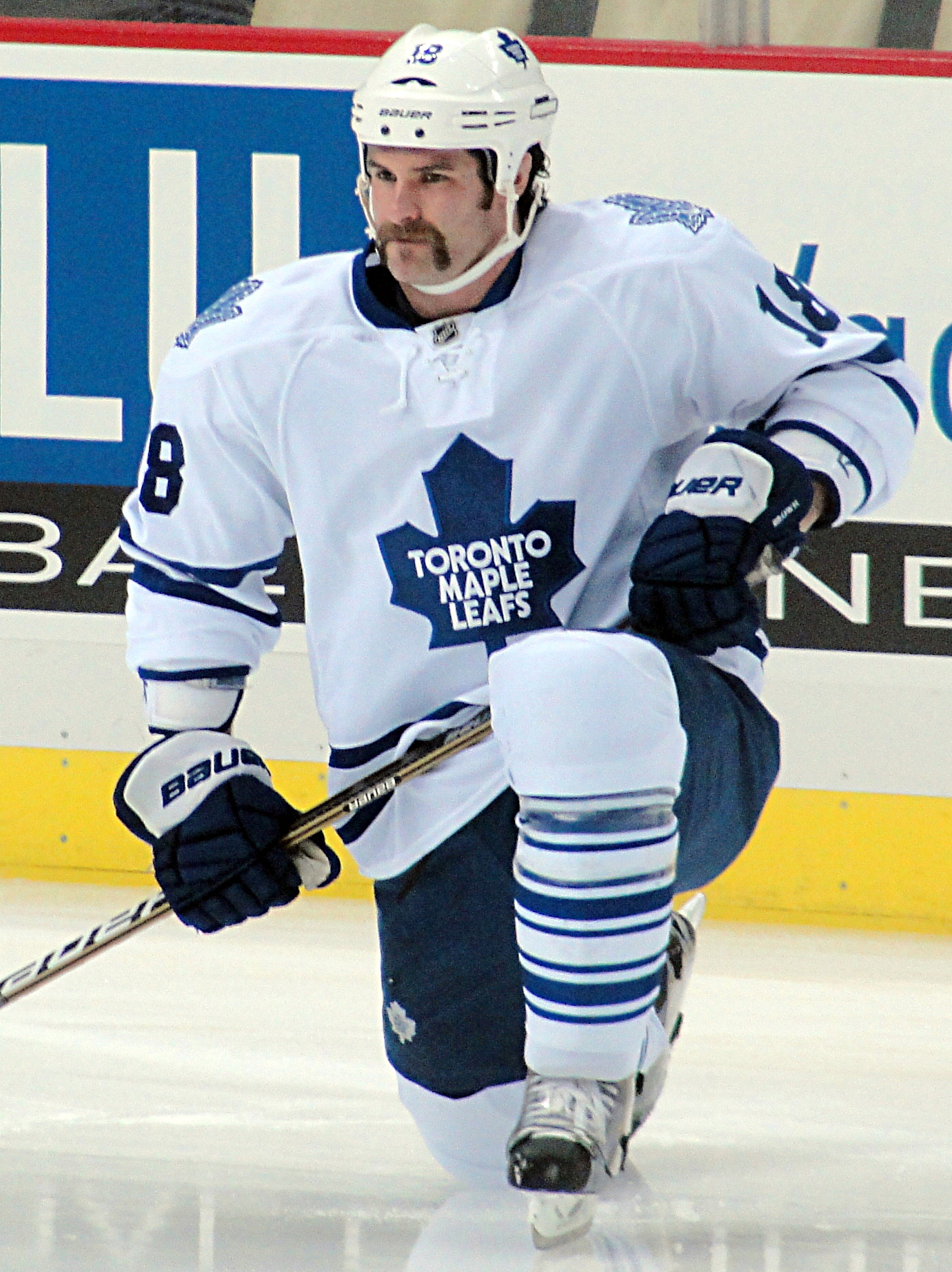
Mike Brown

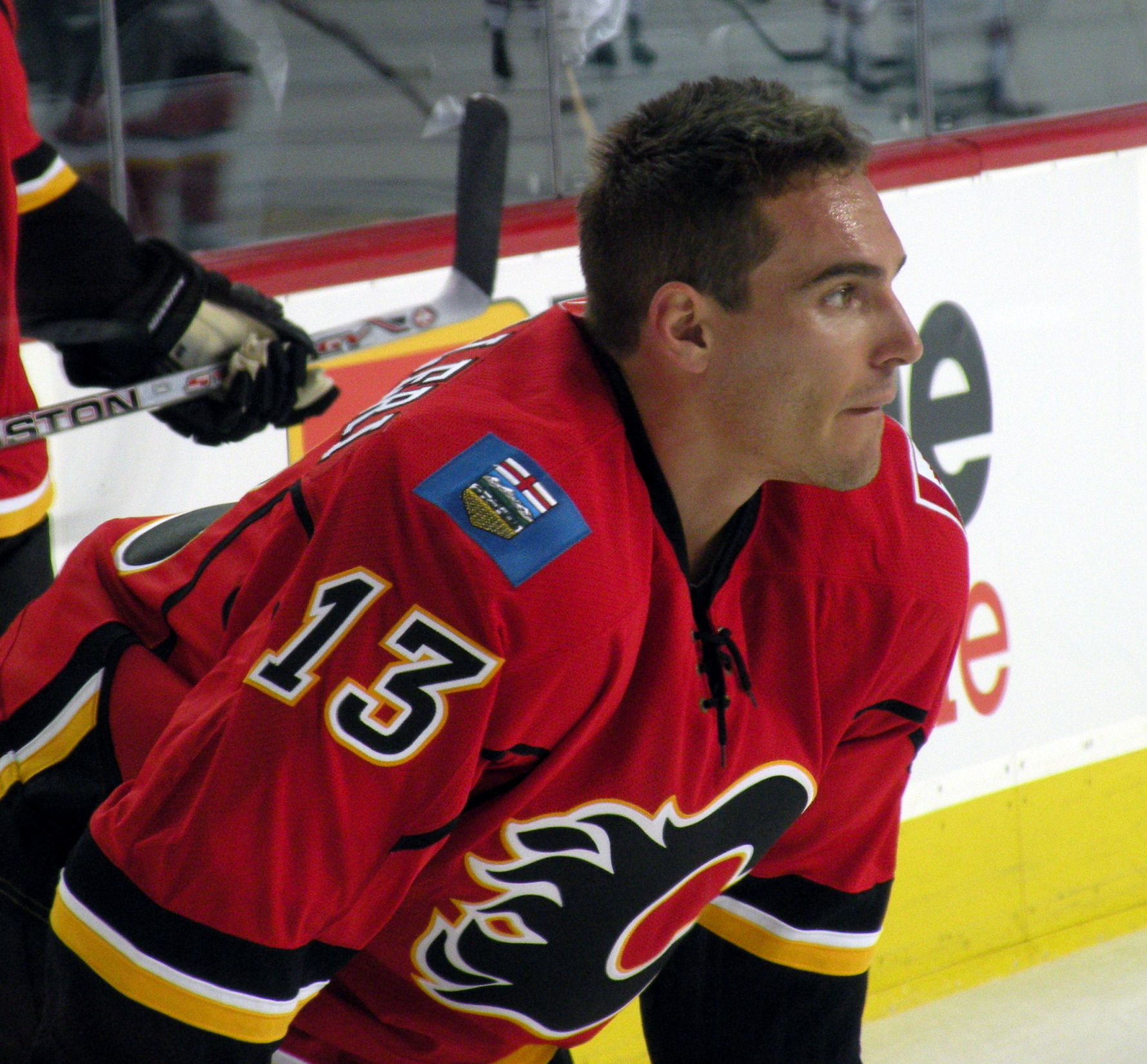
Michael Cammalleri

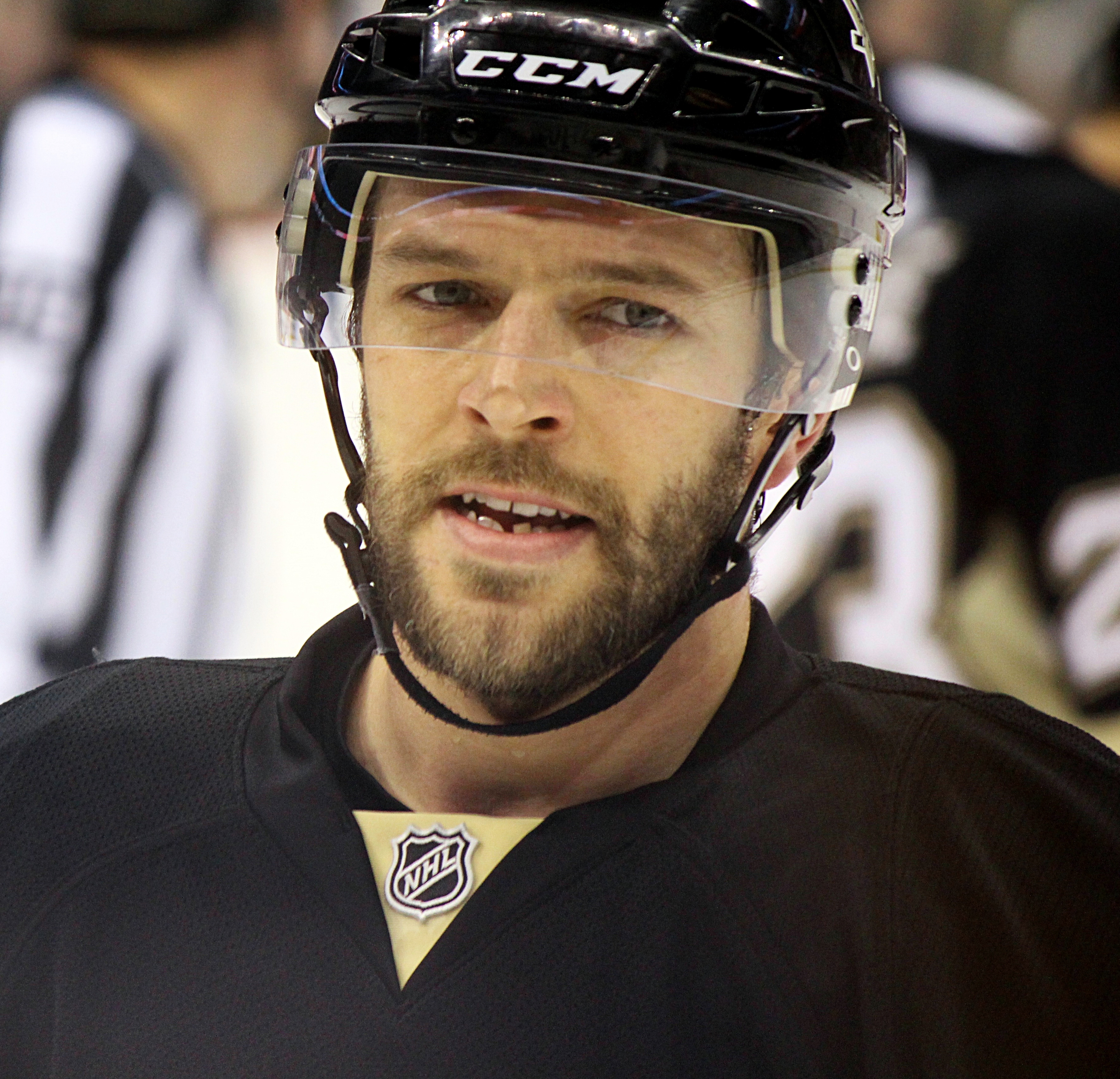
Andrew Ebbett

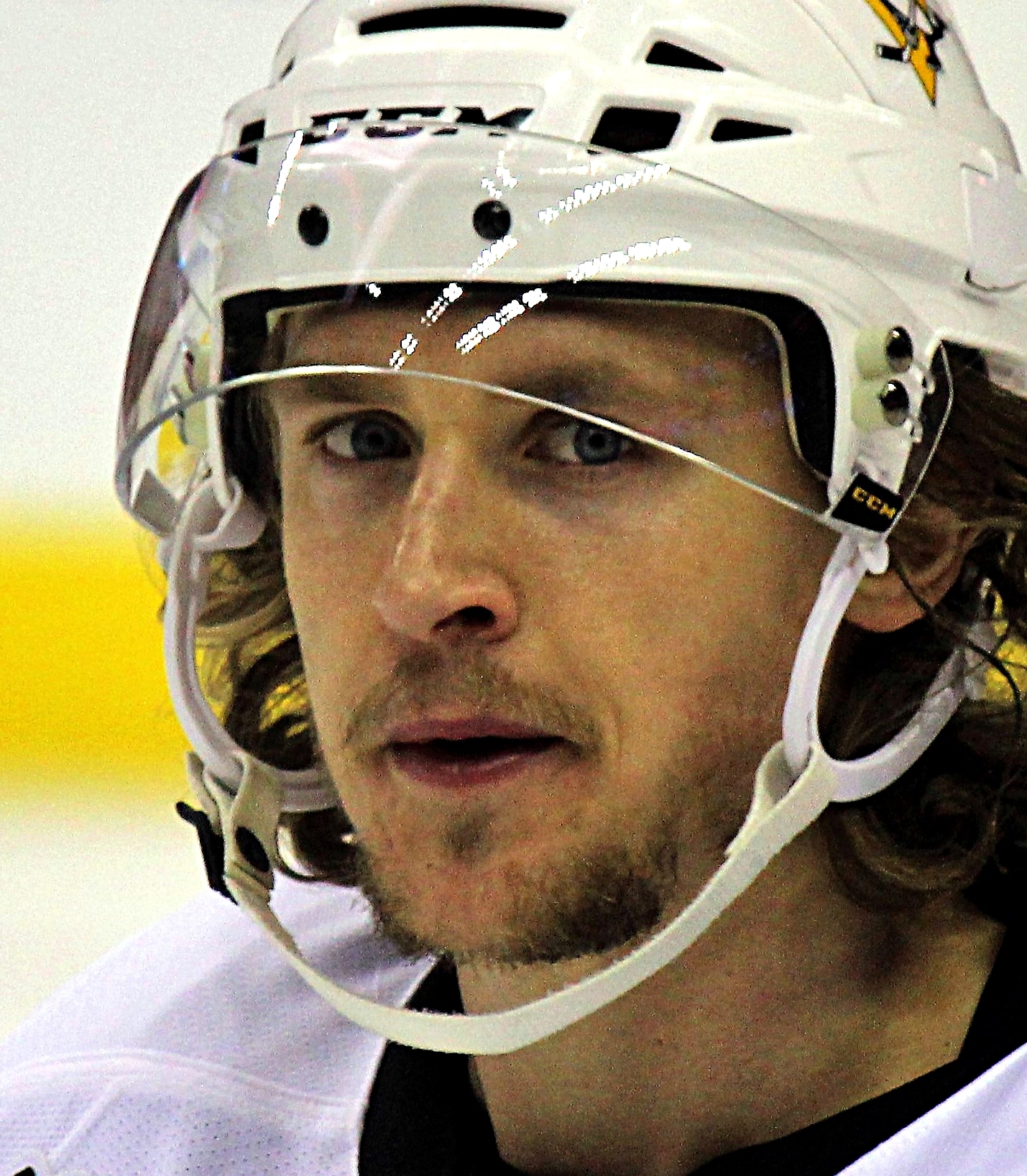
Carl Hagelin

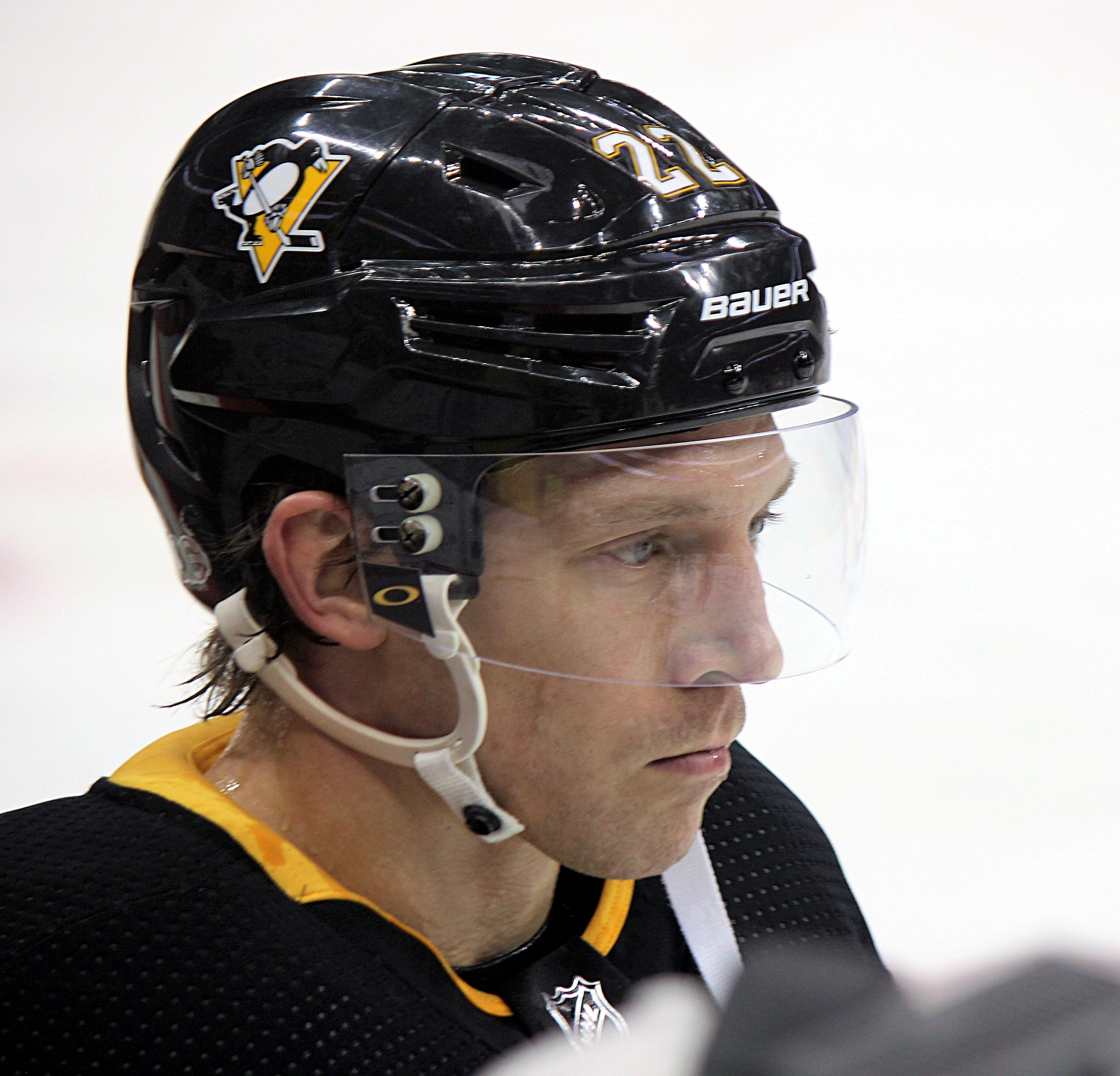
Matt Hunwick

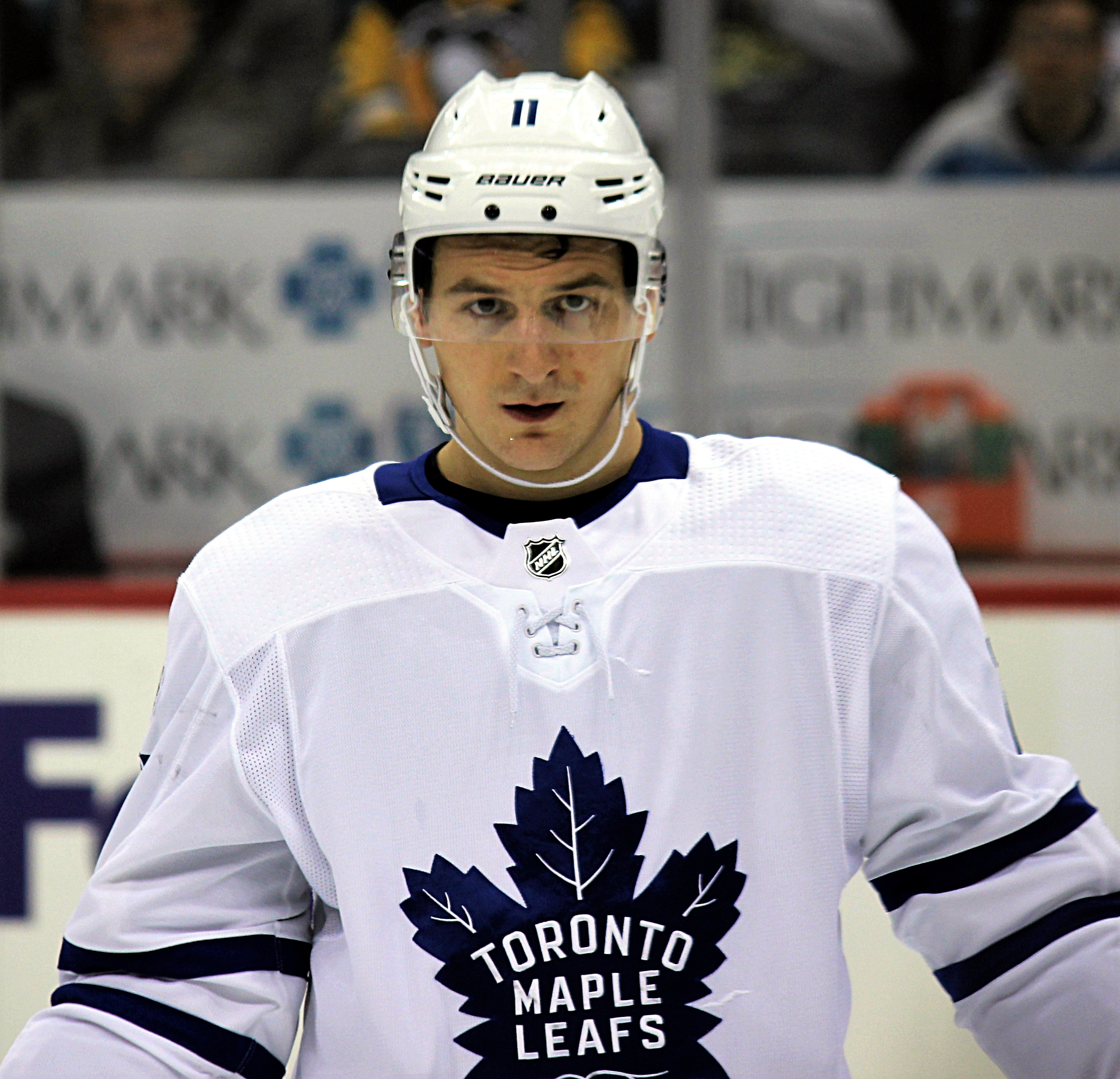
Zach Hyman

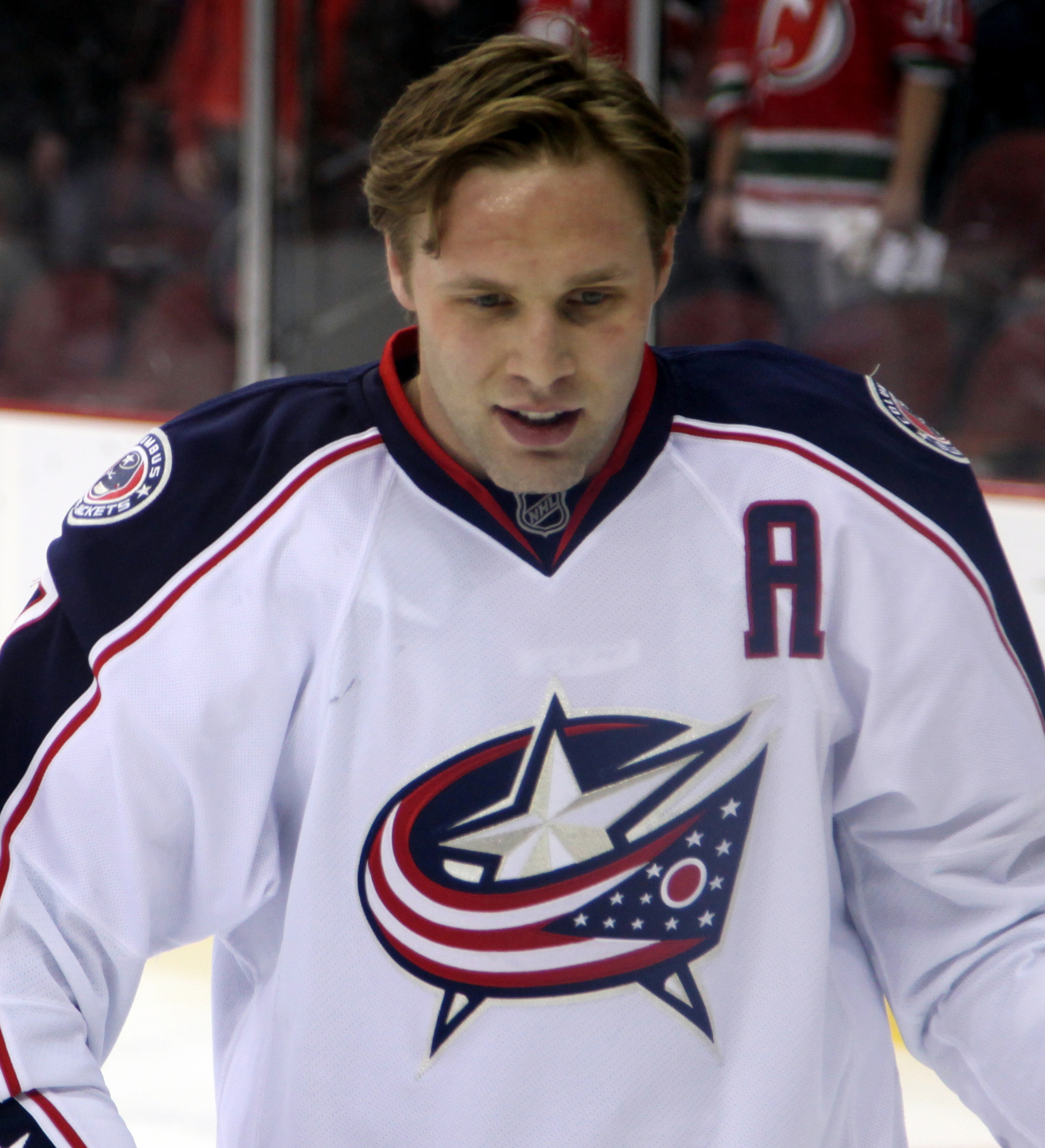
Jack Johnson

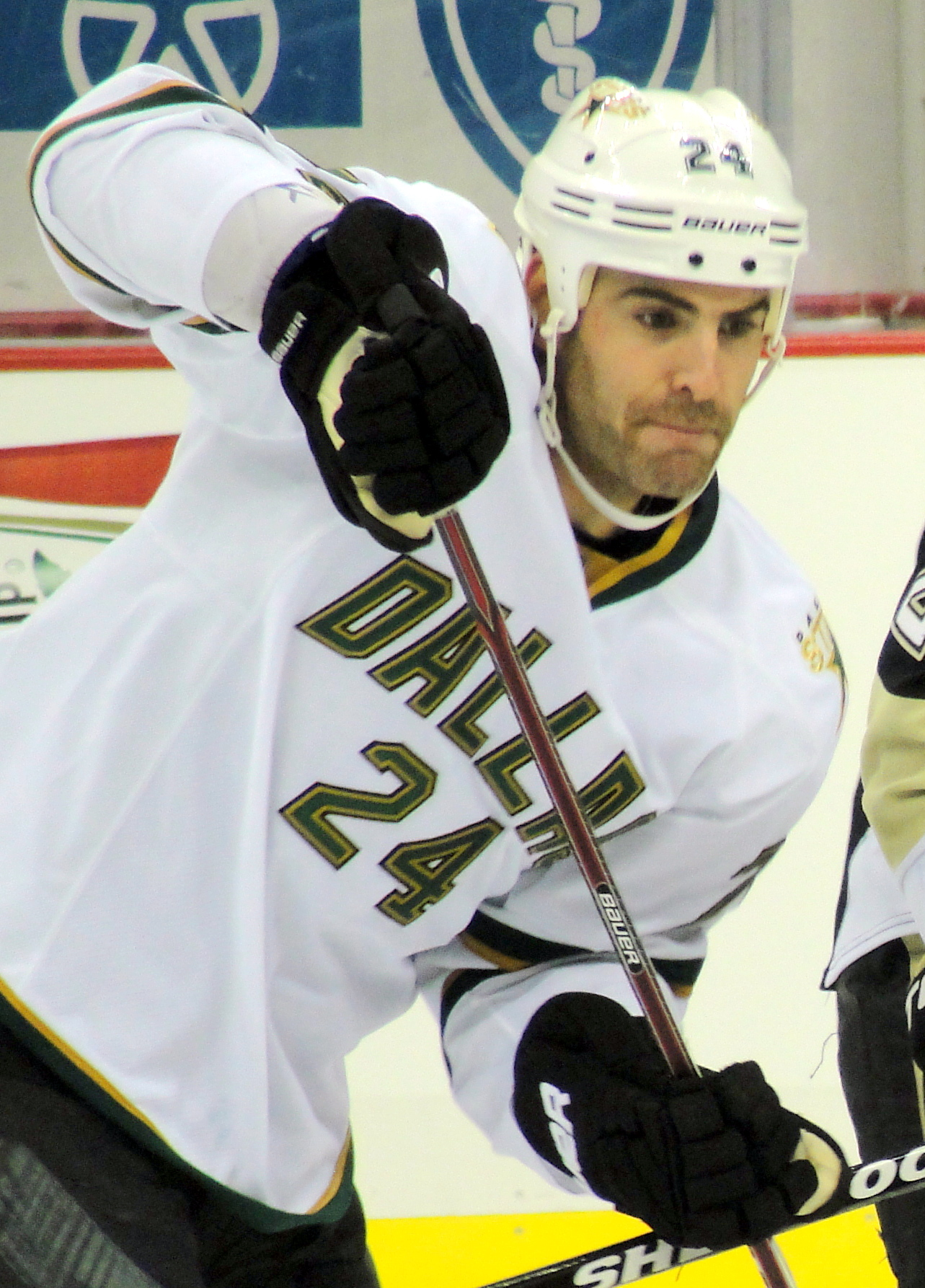
Eric Nystrom

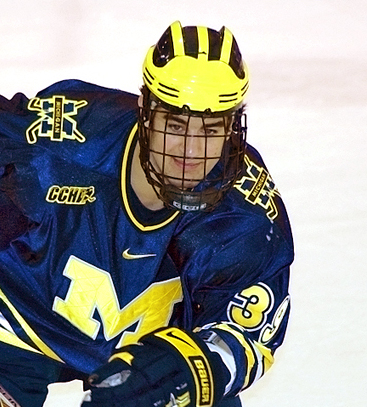
Max Pacioretty

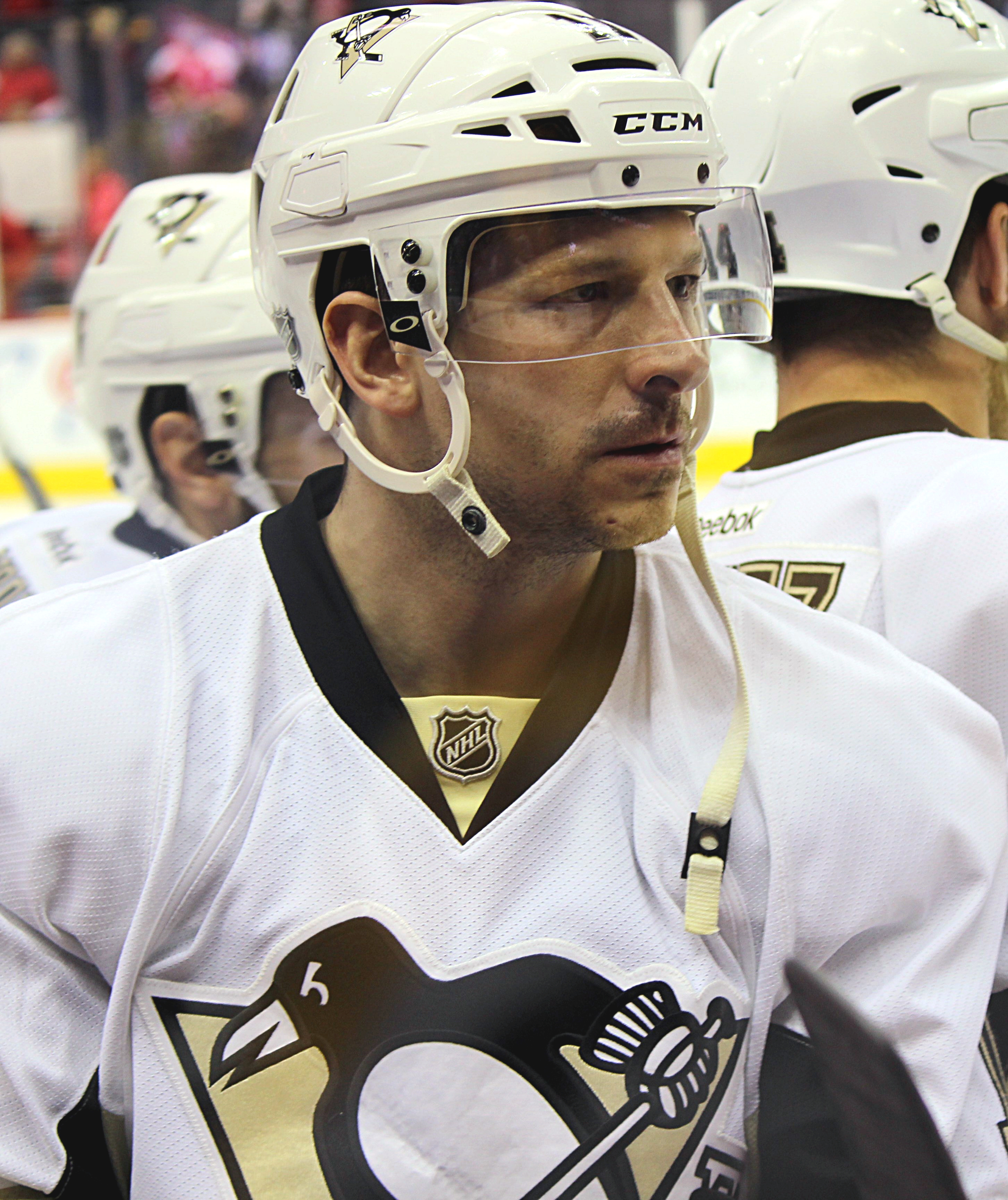
Kevin Porter

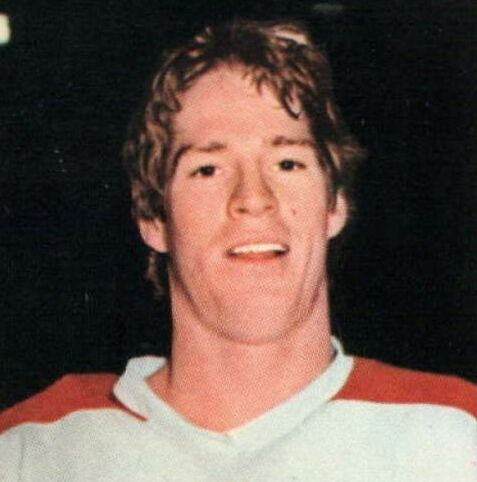
David Shand

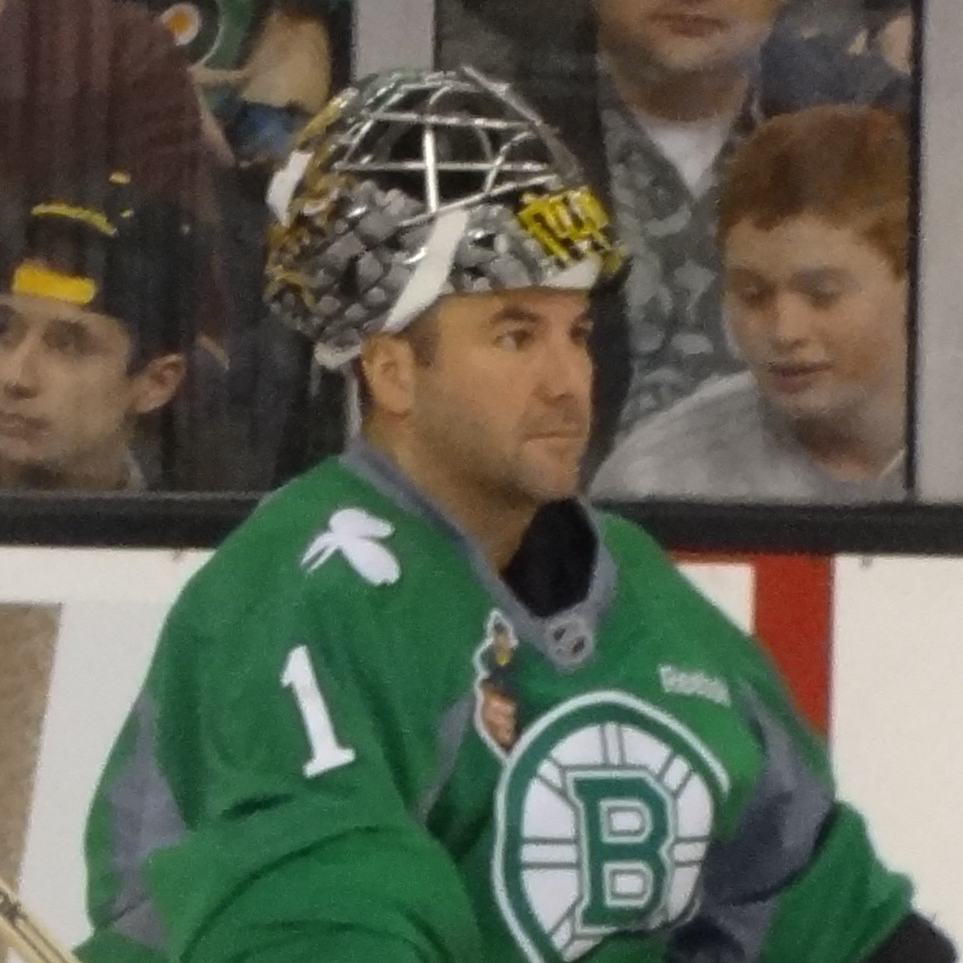
Marty Turco

- Red Berenson (BUS: BBA 1962, MBA 1966), retired in 2017 after 33 years as head coach of the Michigan men's hockey team
- Mike Brown, San Jose Sharks
- Mike Cammalleri, New Jersey Devils
- Andrew Cogliano, Anaheim Ducks
- Mike Comrie, New York Islanders
- Andrew Ebbett, Chicago Blackhawks
- Carl Hagelin, Pittsburgh Penguin
- Matt Herr, ice hockey forward
- Vic Heyliger, 1935–38, All-American
- Quinn Hughes, 15th captain of the Vancouver Canucks, winner of the 2024 Norris Trophy
- Zach Hyman, Toronto Maple Leafs
- Jack Johnson, Columbus Blue Jackets
- Mike Knuble, Washington Capitals
- Chad Kolarik, Phoenix Coyotes
- Mike Komisarek, Carolina Hurricanes
- John Madden, center for the Minnesota Wild
- Al Montoya, goalie, first Cuban-American selected in NHL entry draft
- Brendan Morrison, 1997, center and 17th Hobey Baker Memorial Award winner in 1997
- Eric Nystrom, 2005, Calgary Flames, now on the Nashville Predators
- Jed Ortmeyer, San Jose Sharks; former captain of the Wolverines; not drafted
- Max Pacioretty, Montreal Canadiens
- Kevin Porter, Phoenix Coyotes
- John Harold "Johnny" Sherf (BA 1936), NHL player, first U.S. citizen to have his name engraved on the Stanley Cup
- Steve Shields, Buffalo Sabres, San Jose Sharks
- Jeff Tambellini, Los Angeles Kings
- Marty Turco, NHL goaltender, Most Outstanding Player of the 1998 Frozen Four; 2006 Canadian Olympic Team selection
- Aaron Ward, NHL player

==== Hockey draftees ====
Hockey draftees by team, year and round drafted, for the years 2006 to 1969:

- Chris Summers, Phoenix Coyotes, 2006, 1
- Mark Mitera, Anaheim Ducks, 2006, 1
- T. J. Hensick, Colorado Avalanche, 2005, 3
- Jack Johnson, Carolina Hurricanes, 2005, 1
- Chad Kolarik, Phoenix Coyotes, 2004, 7
- Matt Hunwick, Boston Bruins, 2004, 7
- Mike Brown, Vancouver Canucks, 2004, 5
- Al Montoya, New York Rangers, 2004, 1
- Danny Richmond, Carolina Hurricanes, 2003, 2
- Jeff Tambellini, Los Angeles Kings, 2003, 1
- Dwight Helminen, Edmonton Oilers, 2002, 8
- Jason Ryznar, New Jersey Devils, 2002, 3
- Michael Cammalleri, Los Angeles Kings, 2001, 2
- Brandon Rogers, Mighty Ducks of Anaheim, 2001, 4
- David Moss, Calgary Flames, 2001, 7
- Mike Komisarek, Montreal Canadiens, 2001, 1
- Andy Hilbert, Boston Bruins, 2000, 2
- Jeff Jillson, San Jose Sharks, 1999, 1
- Josh Blackburn, Phoenix Coyotes, 1998, 5
- Blake Sloan, Dallas Stars, 1998
- Mike Van Ryn, New Jersey Devils, 1998, 1
- John Madden, New Jersey Devils, 1998, 11
- Josh Langfeld, Ottawa Senators, 1997, 3
- Bubba Berenzweig, New York Islanders, 1996, 5
- Bill Muckalt, Vancouver Canucks, 1994, 9
- Marty Turco, Dallas Stars, 1994, 5
- Matt Herr, Washington Capitals, 1994, 4
- Greg Crozier, Pittsburgh Penguins, 1994, 3
- Robb Gordon, Vancouver Canucks, 1994, 2
- Jason Botterill, Dallas Stars, 1994, 1
- Mike Legg, New Jersey Devils, 1993, 11
- Warren Luhning, New York Islanders, 1993, 4
- Kevin Hilton, Detroit Red Wings, 1993, 3
- Brendan Morrison, New Jersey Devils, 1993, 2
- Steven Halko, Hartford Whalers, 1992, 10
- Ryan Sittler, Philadelphia Flyers, 1992, 1
- Brian Wiseman, New York Rangers, 1991, 12
- David Oliver, Edmonton Oilers, 1991, 7
- Steve Shields, Buffalo Sabres, 1991, 5
- Mike Knuble, Detroit Red Wings, 1991, 4
- Aaron Ward, Winnipeg Jets, 1991, 1
- Patrick Neaton, Pittsburgh Penguins, 1990, 7
- Mark Ouimet, Washington Capitals, 1990, 5
- Chris Tamer, Pittsburgh Penguins, 1990, 4
- Cam Stewart, Boston Bruins, 1990, 3
- David Harlock, New Jersey Devils, 1990, 2
- Doug Evans, Winnipeg Jets, 1989, 7
- David Roberts, St. Louis Blues, 1989, 6
- Denny Felsner, St. Louis Blues, 1989, 3
- Bryan Deasley, Calgary Flames, 1987, 1
- Scott Sharples, Calgary Flames, 1986, 9
- Brad Turner, Minnesota North Stars, 1986, 3
- Myles O'Connor, New Jersey Devils, 1985, 3
- Brad Jones, Winnipeg Jets, 1984, 8
- Gary Lorden, Winnipeg Jets, 1984, 6
- Jeff Norton, New York Islanders, 1984, 3
- Bill Brauer, Montreal Canadiens, 1982, 12
- Dave Richter, Minnesota North Stars, 1980, 10
- Brian Lundberg, Pittsburgh Penguins, 1980, 9
- Paul Fricker, Hartford Whalers, 1980, 9
- Murray Eaves, Winnipeg Jets, 1980, 3
- John Olver, Colorado Rockies, 1978, 8
- Dean Turner, New York, 1978, 3
- Rob Palmer, Los Angeles Kings, 1976, 5
- Dave Debol, Chicago Blackhawks, 1976, 4
- David Shand, Atlanta Flames, 1976, 1
- Doug Lindskog, St. Louis Blues, 1975, 7
- Gary Morrison, Philadelphia Flyers, 1975, 5
- Pat Hughes, Montreal Canadiens, 1975, 3
- Don Dufek, Detroit Red Wings, 1974, 6
- Angie Moretto, California Golden Seals, 1973, 11
- Greg Fox, Atlanta Flames, 1973, 11

=== Softball ===
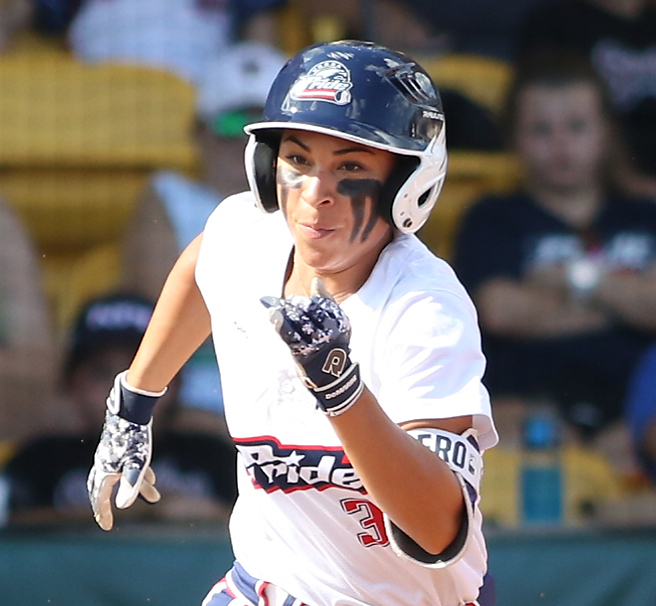
Sierra Romero

- Jenny Allard, first-team All-American and Big Ten Player of the Year in 1989, inducted into the Athletic Hall of Honor in 2008, current head coach of the Harvard softball team
- Patti Benedict, first-team All-American in 1993, Big Ten Player of the Year in 1992 and 1993
- Michelle Bolster, Big Ten Player of the Year in 1988, current head coach of the Indiana Hoosiers softball team
- Amanda Chidester, first-team All-American in 2011, Big Ten Player of the Year in 2010 and 2011, holds UM record for career home runs
- Traci Conrad, first-team All-American in 1997 and 1998, first player to win two Big Ten batting titles, holds Big Ten record with 345 career hits
- Sara Driesenga, compiled a 31–9 record with 247 strikeouts and a 1.89 ERA in 2013
- Samantha Findlay, first-team All-American in 2007, MVP of the 2005 Women's College World Series, holds UM records for home runs in RBIs in a career (219), career slugging percentage (.677), and RBIs in a season (77)
- Sara Griffin, first-team All-American in 1995, 1996, and 1998, compiled a win–loss record of 106–19 at Michigan
- Tiffany Haas, first-team All-American in 2005, led the 2005 national championship team in hits
- Kelsey Kollen, first-team All-American in 2001, married to Major League Baseball pitcher and fellow UM alum J. J. Putz
- Kelly Kovach, first-team All-American in 1995, Academic All-American 1994–1995, Big Ten Pitcher of the Year in 1992 and 1995
- Jessica Merchant, captain of the 2005 Michigan team that won the 2005 Women's College World Series; Offensive Player of the Year in National Pro Fastpitch in 2006
- Vicki Morrow, Big Ten Player of the Year in 1987; Big Ten All-Decade Team; inducted into the Athletic Hall of Honor in 2004
- Nikki Nemitz, first-team All-American in 2009; career record of 92-16 as a pitcher at Michigan
- Jennie Ritter, USA Softball's Player of the Year and first-team All-American in 2005; three victories for USA Elite Team at the Canada Cup; led the Elite Team to a gold medal at the Intercontinental Cup
- Sierra Romero, Big Ten Player of the Year as a freshman in 2013; broke UM's single-season home run record
- Alicia Seegert, set Big Ten records for batting average (.418 in 1984), hits, total bases and RBIs; inducted into the Athletic Hall of Honor in 2006
- Kellyn Tate, All-Big Ten player 1996, 1997, and 1998; won the Women's Pro Softball League batting title in 1998
- Jordan Taylor, compiled a 31–4 record as a freshman in 2008; co-Big Ten Player of the Year in 2010 with a 26–3 record and a 1.42 ERA
- Haylie Wagner, unanimously selected as Big Ten Pitcher of the Year in 2012 after compiling a 32–7 record and a 1.53 earned run average as a freshman

=== Swimming ===
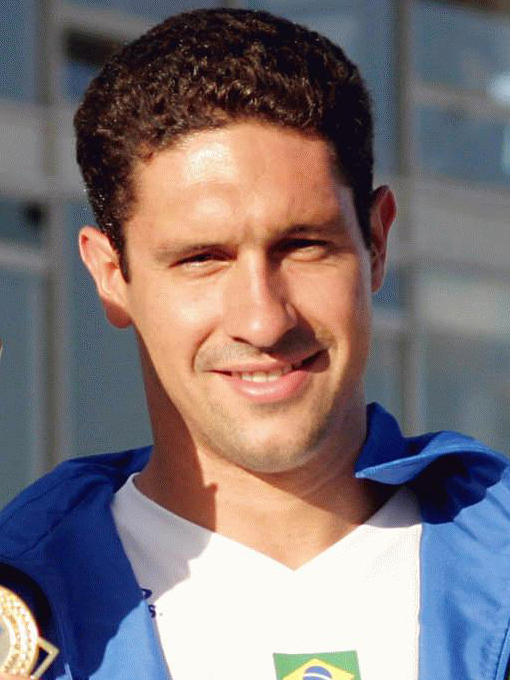
Gustavo Borges

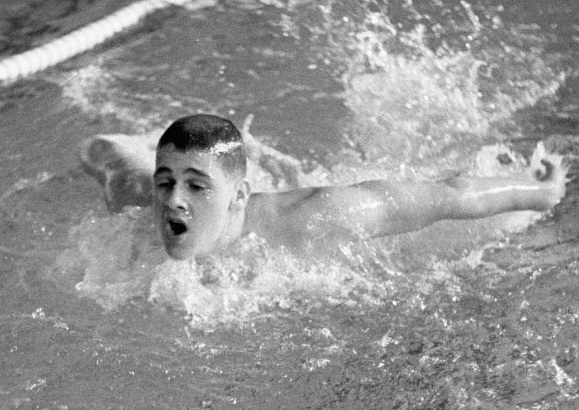
Carl Robie

International Swimming Hall of Fame inductees, including year of induction:

- Mike Barrowman, 1997, Swimming USA
- Gustavo Borges, 2012, Swimming BRA
- Dick Degener, 1971, Diving USA
- Tom Dolan, 2006, Swimming USA, 1996 (Atlanta) and 2000 (Sydney) Summer Olympics gold medalist and former world record holder
- Taylor Drysdale, 1994, Swimming USA
- Ginny Duenkel, 1985, Swimming USA
- Jamison "Jam" Handy, 1965, contributor USA
- Bruce Harlan, 1973, Diving USA*
- Harry Holiday, 1991, Swimming USA
- Dick Kimball, 1985, Coach/Diving USA**
- Micki King, 1978, Diving USA
- Matthew Mann II, 1965, coach USA/Great Britain
- Richard O. Papenguth, 1986, coach USA****
- Michael Phelps, Swimming USA, 2000 Sydney, 2004 Athens and 2008 Beijing Summer Olympics; 21-time gold medal winner, holds seven world records
- Carl Robie, 1976, Swimming USA
- Gus Stager, 1982, coach USA
- Bob Webster, 1970, Diving USA

=== Track and field ===
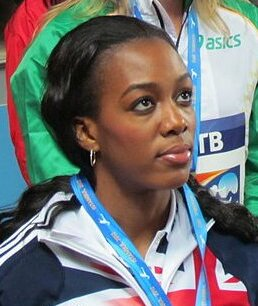
Tiffany Porter

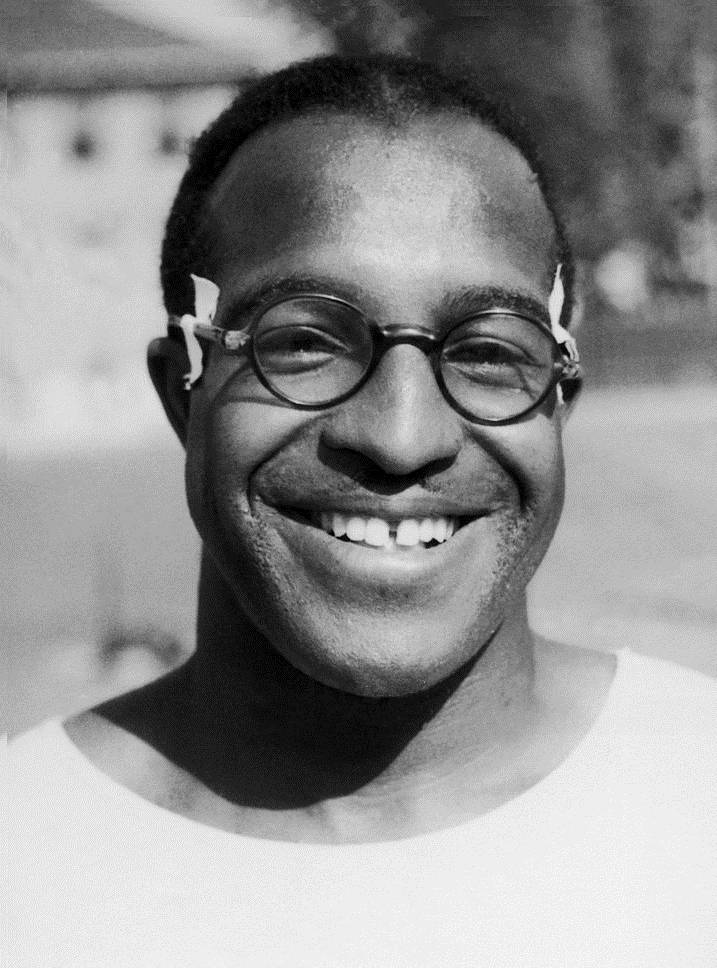
Eddie Tolan

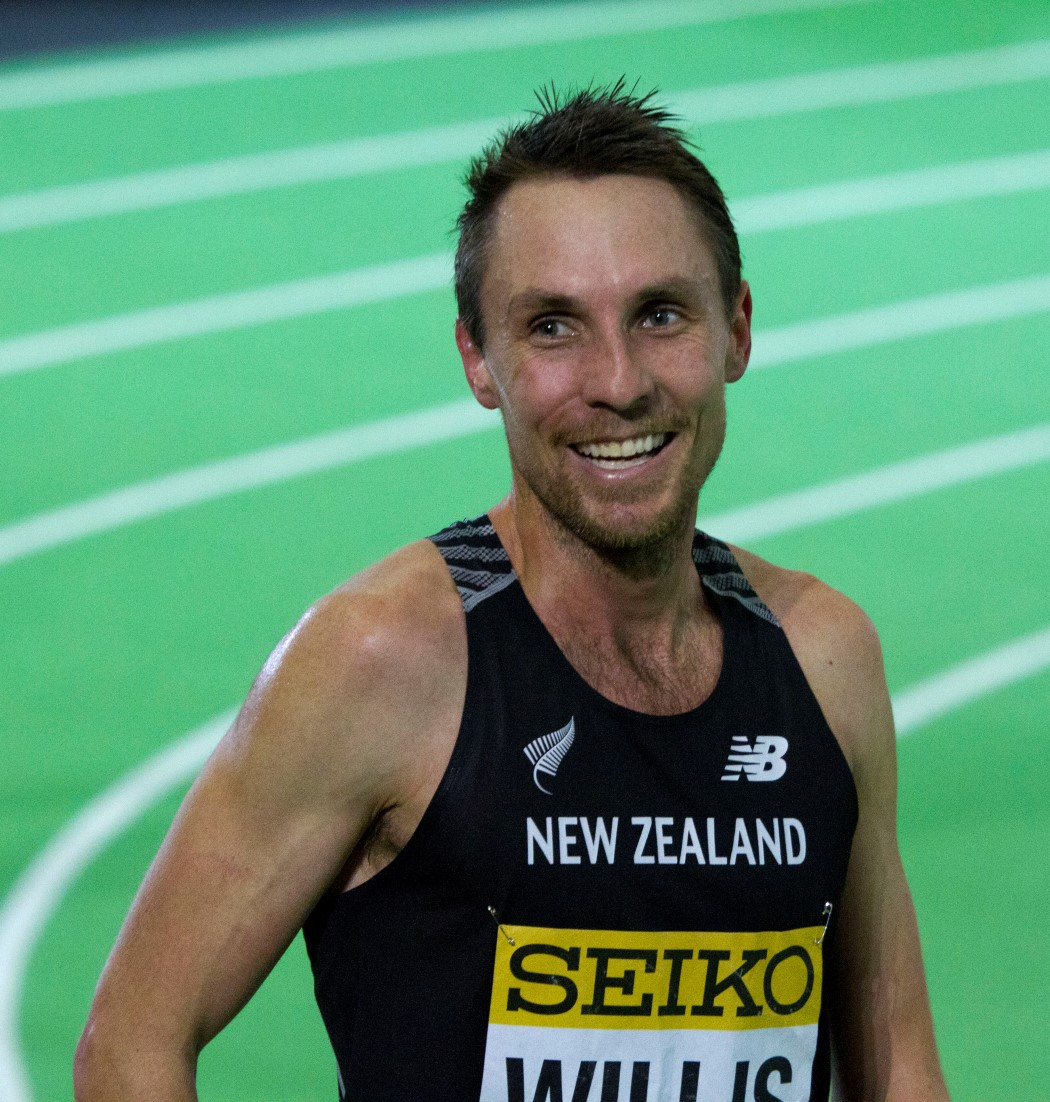
Nick Willis

- Dan Cooke, 2002 and 2004 Big Ten champion in the DMR
- Brian Diemer (1983), 1984 Summer Olympics bronze medalist in the steeplechase
- Bill Donakowski (1980), US marathon champion in 1986
- Charlie Fonville, set world record in the shot put, 1948
- Elmer Gedeon, Big Ten track champion, killed in World War II
- DeHart Hubbard, first African-American gold medalist in individual event at the 1924 Paris Olympics, member of the Omega Psi Phi fraternity (Phi Chapter)
- Katie McGregor (BA English 1999), eight-time NCAA All-American; three-time NCAA champion; three-time Big Ten Conference champion; has won four USATF national championships in distance races since 2005
- Greg Meyer (1978), Detroit Marathon champion (1980, course record); Chicago Marathon champion (1982) and Boston Marathon champion (1983)
- Penny Neer, first female athlete from UM to win a national title in a track and field event, winning the discus at the 1982 AIAW outdoor championship, two-time AIAW All-American and three-time Big Ten Conference discus champion
- Tiffany Adaez Porter (formerly Tiffany Ofili and Tiffany Ofili-Porter) (November 13, 1987) (Ph.D.), 100 metres hurdles
- Lisa Larsen Weidenbach Rainsberger (1983), won the Boston and Chicago Marathons; last American woman to win the Boston Marathon; finished 4th in the marathon Olympic trials three times in 1984, 1988 and 1992
- Tom Robinson, athlete from the Bahamas; competed in sprint events
- Jerome Singleton, Paralympic athlete competing mainly in category T44 (single below knee amputation) sprint events
- Kevin Sullivan (BSE CEE 1998), 14-time All-American, four-time NCAA Champion, 12-time Big Ten Champion in cross country and track; placed 5th in the 2000 Olympics in Sydney, Australia in the 1,500-meter event for Canada
- Eddie Tolan, gold medals in 100 and 200 metres, 1932 Olympics; set world record in 100 metres at 9.5
- Bob Ufer, set world indoor record of 48.1 in the indoor 440-yard; All-American, 1943; once held eight U-M track records; broadcaster of U-M football, 1944–81
- Willis Ward, NCAA champion in high jump, long jump, 100-yard dash, 400-yard dash; second in voting for AP Big Ten Athlete of the Year, 1933; second African-American in football
- William Watson, Big Ten champion in discus, 1937–39; broad jump, 1937–38; shot put, 1937–38; javelin, 1939
- Alan Webb (MDNG: 2001, 2002), miler; at the New Balance Games in January, Webb's mile time of 3:59.86 seconds at New York City's made him the first American high school miler ever to run under four minutes indoors; current American record holder in the mile run at 3:46.91
- Nick Willis (MNZOM), middle-distance runner; five-time NCAA All-American; six-time Big Ten Champion; two-time NCAA Champion; won Olympic silver medal in 2008 and Olympic bronze medal in Rio in 2016

=== Tennis ===
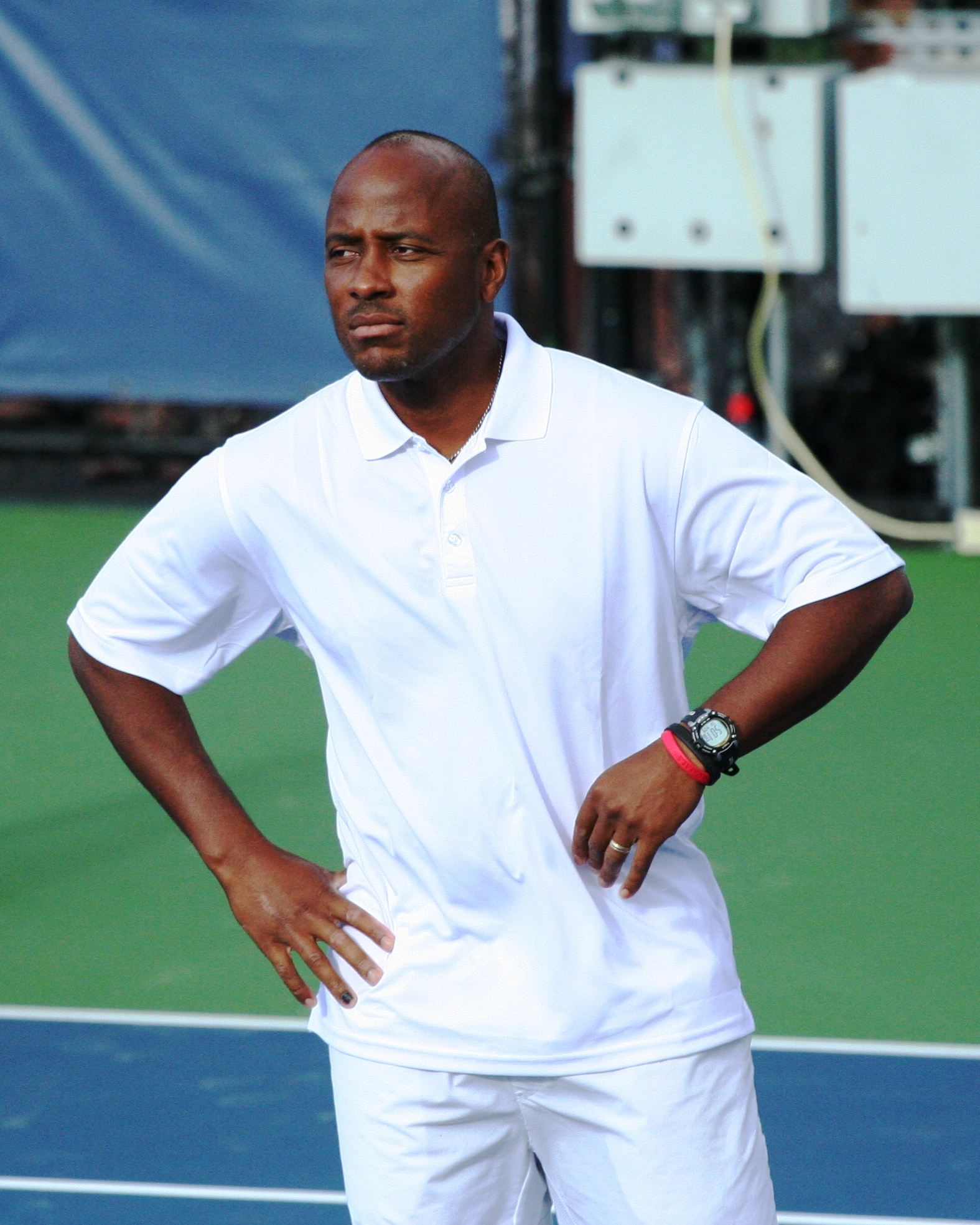
MaliVai Washington

- Peter Fishbach (born 1947), tennis player
- Eric Friedler (born 1954), tennis player
- Barry MacKay, tennis player, tournament director and tennis broadcaster
- Joel Ross, tennis player
- Guy Sasson (born 1980), Israeli Paralympic wheelchair tennis player
- MaliVai Washington, tennis player, ranked No. 1 US college player at the end of his sophomore season; first African-American male to reach Wimbledon final since Arthur Ashe in 1975

=== Various ===
- Elizabeth ("Betsey") Armstrong, water polo goalkeeper
- Ryan Bertin, two-time NCAA champion wrestler
- Bora Gulari (COE: 2001 BS ASE), named Rolex Yachtsman of the Year in 2009; won his first Moth world championship his second time out and became the first American in 33 years to claim the class' world title; included a win of the Harken McLube Moth Pacific Rim Championship along with second-place finishes at the Moth U.S. National Championship and U.S. Pacific Coast Championship; 2013 Moth national and world champion
- Janet Guthrie, first woman to compete in the Indianapolis 500 and the first woman to compete in the Daytona 500
- Newton C. Loken (Ph.D.), former artistic gymnast and coach of gymnastics, trampolining and cheerleading; coach of the University of Michigan gymnastics team for 36 years, 1948–1983
- Dave Porter, former two-time NCAA collegiate wrestling champion and football player
- Brandi Rhodes, professional wrestler and personality
- Robert Rechsteiner (a.k.a. Rick Steiner), amateur and professional wrestler; amateur standout at the University of Michigan, placing 4th at an NCAA championship competition
- Scott Rechsteiner (B.S.E.) (a.k.a. Scott Steiner), amateur and professional wrestler
- Alan I. Rothenberg (A.B., 1960; LAW: J.D., 1963), chairman of the board of the 1994 World Cup Organizing Committee, president of the U.S. Soccer Federation and founder and chair of Major League Soccer
- Steve Warner, 2000, winner of 1997 Caviston Oar, back-to-back winner of Maize and Blue Award (1999-00), 2004 U.S. Olympian in Lightweight Four
- Joe Warren (born 1976), Greco-Roman wrestler and mixed martial artist

=== Olympians ===
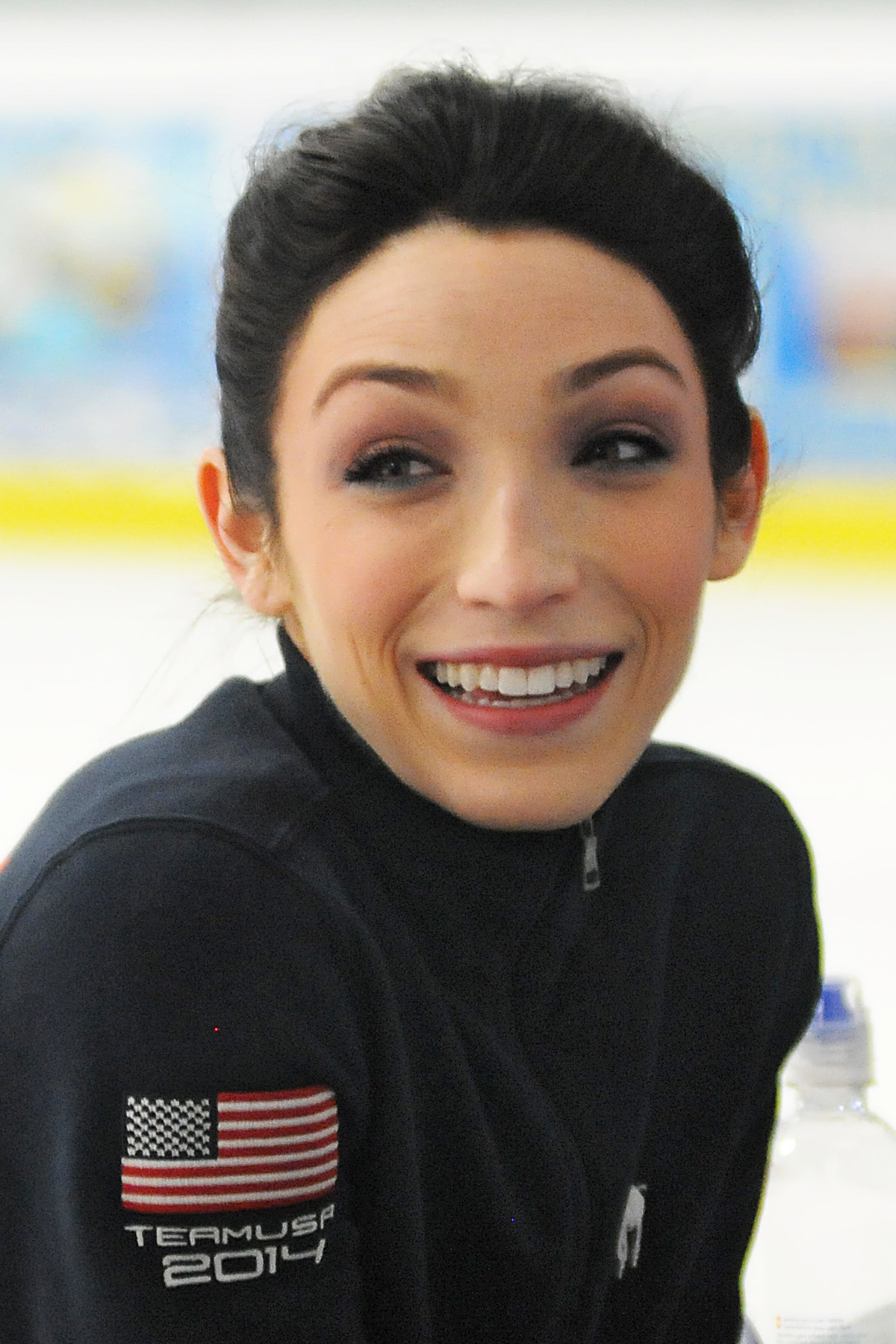
Meryl Davis

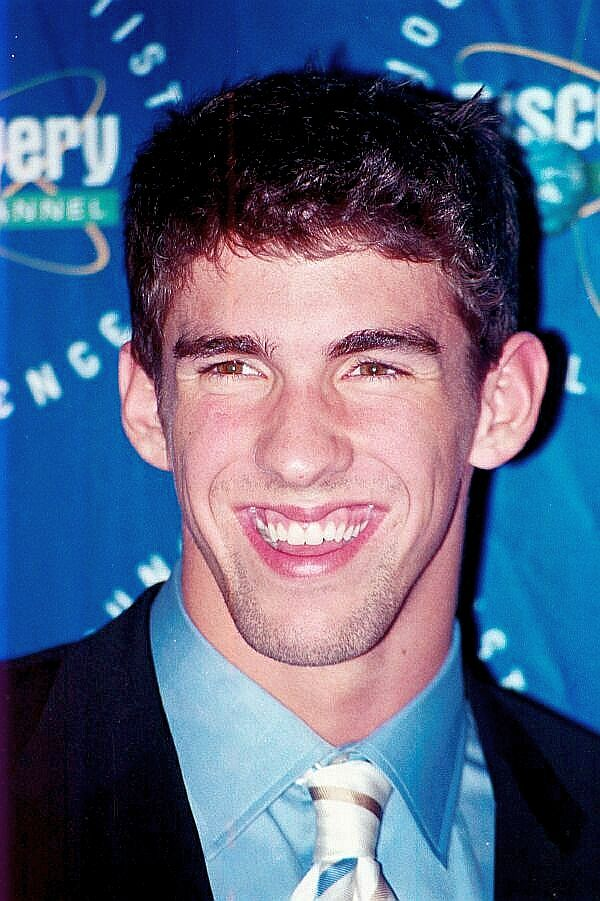
Michael Phelps

- Greg Barton (BSE ME 1983), four-time Olympic medalist in sprint kayaking; won double gold at the 1988 Summer Olympic in Seoul
- Fernando Cañales, 1976 (Montreal), 1980 (Moscow) and 1984 (Los Angeles) Summer Olympics participant and member of the Puerto Rican Hall of Fame
- Meryl Davis, ice dancing; with partner Charlie White won 2009 U.S. championship, 2010 Vancouver Olympics silver medal, and 2014 Sochi Olympics gold medal
- Tom Dolan, 1996 (Atlanta) and 2000 (Sydney) Summer Olympics gold medalist swimmer
- Gordon Downie 1976 (Montreal) Summer Olympics bronze medalist swimmer
- Steve Fraser, 1984 (Los Angeles) Olympics Greco-Roman wrestling gold medalist
- Andy Hrovat, three-time NCAA All-American wrestler; 2008 Summer Olympics competitor in wrestling
- Brent Lang (BSE IO 1990), 1988 (Seoul) Olympics gold medallist in swimming as a member of the 400-meter freestyle relay team
- Matthew Mann, Olympic swim coach
- Bill Martin (BUS: MBA 1965), president of the United States Olympic Committee USOC
- Alan McClatchey, 1976 (Montreal) Summer Olympics bronze medalist swimmer
- Sam Mikulak, 2012 and 2016 Olympic gymnast
- Richard O. Papenguth, Olympic swim coach
- Michael Phelps, Olympic swimmer 2000 (Sydney), 2004 (Athens), 2008 (Beijing), 2012 (London), 2016 (Rio de Janeiro), multiple gold medalist
- Alfonso Qua (BSE ChE ’56), Olympic sailor (Soling) 1972 Kiel
- Elise Ray, Olympic gymnast
- Nick Willis (MNZOM), four-time Olympian representing New Zealand at the 2004 Athens Olympics, 2008 Beijing Olympics (silver medal, 1500 metres), 2012 London Olympics, 2016 Rio Olympics (bronze medal, 1500 metres)
- Marcel Wouda, Olympic swimmer

Through the 2004 Summer Olympics in Athens, 178 Michigan student-athletes and coaches had participated in the Olympics. The university has had medal winners in every Summer Olympics except 1896, and gold medalists in all but four Olympiads. A total of 22 countries, including the U.S., have been represented by Michigan athletes.

Table of Michigan Olympians

=== Coaches ===
- George Allen (MS 1947), Virginia Sports Hall of Fame 1998; Pro Football Hall of Fame 2002; Los Angeles Rams head coach (1978, fired after two preseason games); Washington Redskins head coach (1971–77); Los Angeles Rams head coach (1966–70); Chicago Bears defensive coordinator (1962–65); Chicago Bears personnel director/assistant coach (1958–61); Los Angeles Rams assistant coach (1957)
- Charles A. Baird (A.B. 1895) (c. 1870–1944), football manager, university athletic director, and banker; first athletic director at the University of Michigan
- Kiefer Haffey (2020), college basketball coach
- Daniel Earle McGugin (1879–1936), football player, coach and lawyer; called by some the dean of SEC football
- Christine Rawak, coach, former athletic director at the University of Delaware
- Harold "Tubby" Raymond (BSE), former head football and baseball coach University of Delaware
- Jon Charles Urbanchek (BS 1962), U. of Michigan men's swimming and diving head coach 1982–2004, NCAA Championship 1995; Olympic swim coach 1976, 1984, 1988, 1992, 1996, 2000, 2004, 2008; International Swimming Hall of Fame; coached numerous NCAA and world champions, gold medalists and world record holders

=== Team ownership and other sports business ===
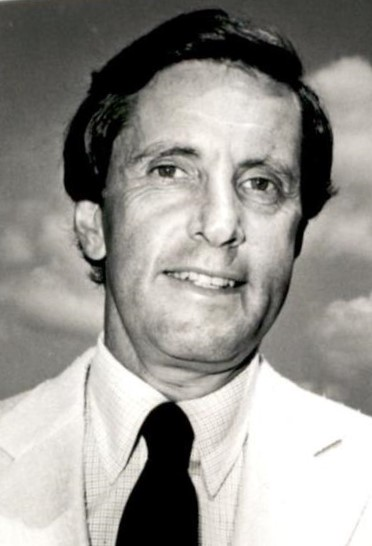
Fred Wilpon

- William Davidson (BUS: BBA 1947), finance and entertainment billionaire; founder of the William Davidson Institute at the Ross School of Business; Chairman of Guardian Industries, world's largest glass manufacturer; owner of the Detroit Pistons (NBA), Detroit Shock (WNBA), Tampa Bay Lightning (NHL) at his death in 2009
- Wycliffe Grousbeck (LAW: JD), assumed the role of managing partner and CEO of the Boston Celtics on December 31, 2002, after leading a local investment group that purchased the team
- Tom Lewand (AB ’91/MBA/JD ’96), president of the Detroit Lions
- Rob Pelinka (BUS: B.B.A. 1993; LAW: J.D. 1996), basketball player at UM; prominent agent for many NBA stars, most notably Kobe Bryant
- Alan I. Rothenberg (A.B., 1960; LAW: J.D., 1963), chairman of the board of the 1994 FIFA World Cup Organizing Committee; president of the U.S. Soccer Federation; founder and chair of Major League Soccer
- Harvey Schiller (Ph.D.), member of Great Court Capital of New York and former United States Olympic Committee chief; former president of the International Baseball Federation and CEO of Global Options Group, a security investigation company; 24 years as an Air Force pilot, combat service in Vietnam; commissioner of the Southeastern Conference, USOC chief and head of sports at Turner Broadcasting
- Richard P. Tinkham (LAW: 1957), American Basketball Association (ABA) co-founder; co-founded the original ABA and the Indiana Pacers franchise in 1967; served for two years as president of the ABA Board of Trustees; instrumental in the creation of Market Square Arena in Indianapolis in 1972–75
- Preston Robert (Bob) Tisch (BA 1948), billionaire chairman of the Loews Corporation; United States Postmaster General 1986–1988; owned 50 percent of the New York Giants football team
- Fred Wilpon (AB 1958), president, CEO, and co-owner of the New York Mets baseball team; chairman of the board of Sterling Equities, Inc., a real estate investment and development firm, and of Pathogenesis Corp., a biotechnology company
- Ralph C. Wilson, Jr. (LAW), owned Buffalo Bills football team
- Arthur Wirtz (AB 1923) (1901–1983), powerful figure in sports and arena operation; owner of Chicago Stadium, Olympia Stadium in Detroit, the Bismarck Hotel in Chicago, the Chicago Blackhawks, and the Chicago Bulls

== See also ==
- University of Michigan Athletic Hall of Honor
- Michigan Wolverines Football All-Americans
