= 2024–25 USC Trojans women's basketball team =

Intercollegiate basketball season

2024–25 USC Trojans women's basketball

Big Ten regular season champions

NCAA tournament, Elite Eight
- Conference: Big Ten Conference

Ranking
- Coaches: No. 5
- AP: No. 5
- Record: 31–4 (17–1 Big Ten)
- Head coach: Lindsay Gottlieb (4th season)
- Assistant coaches: Beth Burns (3rd season); Wendale Farrow (4th season); Willnett Crockett (2nd season); Courtney Jaco (2nd season)
- Home arena: Galen Center

2024–25 Big Ten women's basketball standings
	Conf.				Overall
Team	W		L	PCT	W		L	PCT
No. 5 USC	17	–	1	.944	31	–	4	.886
No. 3 UCLA †	16	–	2	.889	34	–	3	.919
No. 19 Ohio State	13	–	5	.722	26	–	7	.788
No. 12 Maryland	13	–	5	.722	25	–	8	.758
No. 25 Michigan	11	–	7	.611	23	–	11	.676
Michigan State	11	–	7	.611	22	–	10	.688
Illinois	11	–	7	.611	22	–	10	.688
Oregon	10	–	8	.556	20	–	12	.625
Indiana	10	–	8	.556	20	–	13	.606
Nebraska	10	–	8	.556	21	–	12	.636
Iowa	10	–	8	.556	23	–	11	.676
Washington	9	–	9	.500	19	–	14	.576
Minnesota	8	–	10	.444	25	–	11	.694
Wisconsin	4	–	14	.222	13	–	17	.433
Rutgers	3	–	15	.167	13	–	20	.394
Purdue	3	–	15	.167	10	–	19	.345
Northwestern	2	–	16	.111	9	–	18	.333
Penn State	1	–	17	.056	10	–	19	.345
† 2025 Big Ten tournament winner As of April 7, 2025; Rankings from AP poll

The 2024–25 USC Trojans women's basketball team represented the University of Southern California during the 2024–25 NCAA Division I women's basketball season. The Trojans were led by fourth-year head coach Lindsay Gottlieb, and played their home games at the Galen Center in Los Angeles, California. This marks the program's first season as a member of the Big Ten Conference.

USC entered their first season in the Big Ten expected to finish No. 1 in the preseason conference coaches poll. JuJu Watkins was named the preseason Big Ten conference player of the year.

The Trojans won the Big Ten regular season championship in their first year as a member, and earned a number 1 seed in the 2025 NCAA Division I women's basketball tournament. The season ended with a loss to the eventual national champion UConn Huskies.

== Previous season ==
The Women of Troy finished the Pac-12 regular season tied for second with UCLA. USC held the tiebreaker over UCLA, earning then the 2-seed in the 2024 Pac-12 Conference women's basketball tournament, where they won.

The squad earned their second straight bid for the NCAA women's basketball tournament, earning a No. 1 seed in the Portland region. They went on to beat Texas A&M-Corpus Christi in the First Round, Kansas in the Second Round, and Baylor in the Sweet Sixteen, but lost to Connecticut in the Elite Eight.

They started the season ranked No. 21 and finished the season with a No. 5 AP ranking and a No. 6 ranking in the Coaches' poll.

=== Departures ===
Name	Number	Pos.	Height	Year	Hometown	Reason for Departure
Taylor Bigby	1	G	6'1"	Jr	Las Vegas, NV	Transferred to TCU.
India Otto	2	G	5'9"	GS	Los Angeles, CA	Joined staff as Coordinator of Player Engagement. Graduated.
Kayla Williams	4	G	5'7"	Sr	Los Angeles, CA	Transferred to UC Berkeley. Graduated.
Kaitlyn Davis	24	G/F	6'0"	GS	Norwalk, CT	Drafted in the 3rd Round (35th Overall) in the 2024 WNBA draft by the New York Liberty. Graduated.
McKenzie Forbes	25	G	6'0"	GS	Folsom, CA	Drafted in the 3rd Round (28th Overall) in the 2024 WNBA draft by the Los Angeles Sparks. Graduated.
Roxane Makolo	30	G	5'10"	GS	Quebec, CA	Transferred to Georgia.
Kayla Padilla	45	G	5'9"	GS	Torrance, CA	Graduated

=== Incoming transfers ===
Name	Num	Pos.	Height	Year	Hometown	Previous School
Kiki Iriafen	44	F	6'3"	GS	Los Angeles, CA	Stanford
Talia von Oelhoffen	55	G	5'11"	GS	Tri-Cities, WA	Oregon State

=== 2024 recruiting class ===
Name	Overall Rank	Position	Hometown	High School	Height	ESPN Stars	ESPN Grade
Vivian Iwuchukwu	47	F	Imo State, Nigeria	Montverde Academy	6'3"	4	94
Rian Forester	53	G	Helotes, TX	Brandeis	5'11"	4	94
Laura Williams	89	F	Tampa, FL	St. Paul VI Catholic	6'1"	4	91
Kayleigh Heckel	28	G	Port Chester, NY	Long Island Lutheran	5'9"	5	97
Kennedy Smith	6	G	Chino, CA	Etiwanda	6'1"	5	98
Avery Howell	23	G	Boise, ID	Boise	6'0"	5	97
Brooklyn Shamblin		G	Carpinteria, CA	Oaks Christian	5'9"	3	

== Roster ==
2024–25 USC Trojans women's basketball team
Players
Coaches

Pos.	#	Name	Height	Year	Previous school	Hometown
F	0	Vivian Iwuchukwu	6 ft 3 in (1.91 m)	Fr	Montverde Academy	Imo State, Nigeria
G	3	Aaliyah Gayles	5 ft 9 in (1.75 m)	RS So	Spring Valley	Las Vegas, NV
G	4	Rian Forestier	5 ft 11 in (1.8 m)	Fr	Brandeis	Helotes, TX
F	6	Laura Williams	6 ft 1 in (1.85 m)	Fr	St. Paul VI Catholic	Tampa, FL
G	9	Kayleigh Heckel	5 ft 9 in (1.75 m)	Fr	Long Island Lutheran	Port Chester, NY
G	10	Malia Samuels	5 ft 6 in (1.68 m)	So	Garfield	Seattle, WA
G	11	Kennedy Smith	6 ft 1 in (1.85 m)	Fr	Etiwanda	Chino, CA
G	12	JuJu Watkins	6 ft 2 in (1.88 m)	So	Sierra Canyon	Los Angeles, CA
F/C	13	Rayah Marshall	6 ft 4 in (1.93 m)	Sr	Lynwood	Los Angeles, CA
G	21	Dominique Darius	5 ft 10 in (1.78 m)	RS Jr	Blair Academy	Jacksonville, FL
G	23	Avery Howell	6 ft 0 in (1.83 m)	Fr	Boise	Boise, ID
G	24	Brooklyn Shamblin	5 ft 9 in (1.75 m)	Fr	Oaks Christian	Carpinteria, CA
C	34	Clarice Akunwafo	6 ft 6 in (1.98 m)	Sr	Rolling Hills Prep	Anambra State, Nigeria
F	44	Kiki Iriafen	6 ft 3 in (1.91 m)	GS	Harvard-Westlake; Stanford	Los Angeles, CA
G	55	Talia von Oelhoffen	5 ft 11 in (1.8 m)	GS	Chiawana; Oregon State	Tri-Cities, WA

Head coach

- Lindsay Gottlieb (Brown)

Assistant coach(es)

- Beth Burns (Ohio Wesleyan)
- Wendale Farrow (Eastern Michigan)
- Courtney Jaco (USC)
- Wilnett Crockett (Connecticut)
- Chris Koclanes (Old Dominion)

Legend

- (C) Team captain
- (S) Suspended
- (I) Ineligible
- (W) Walk-on
- Injured
- Current redshirt

Roster
Last update: November 24, 2024

== Schedule and results ==
Date time, TV	Rank^{#}	Opponent^{#}	Result	Record	High points	High rebounds	High assists	Site city, state
Regular season
November 4, 2024*; 9:00 a.m., ESPN	No. 3	vs. No. 20 Ole Miss; Aflac Oui-Play Game	W 68–66	1–0	27 – Watkins	13 – Iriafen	4 – Watkins	Adidas Arena; Paris, France
November 9, 2024*; 2:00 p.m., B1G+	No. 3	Cal Poly	W 90–35	2–0	16 – Watkins	7 – Tied	7 – von Oelhoffen	Galen Center (5,215); Los Angeles, California
November 12, 2024*; 7:00 p.m., B1G+	No. 3	Cal State Northridge	W 124–39	3–0	21 – Watkins	9 – Marshall	9 – Watkins	Galen Center (3,064); Los Angeles, California
November 15, 2024*; 12:00 p.m., B1G+	No. 3	Santa Clara	W 81–50	4–0	22 – Watkins	7 – Iriafen	6 – von Oelhoffen	Galen Center (3,594); Los Angeles, California
November 23, 2024*; 1:00 p.m., NBC	No. 3	No. 6 Notre Dame	L 61–74	4–1	15 – Iriafen	9 – Tied	5 – Watkins	Galen Center (7,894); Los Angeles, California
November 27, 2024*; 4:00 p.m., TruTV	No. 6	vs. Seton Hall; Acrisure Holiday Invitational	W 84–51	5–1	20 – Watkins	11 – Marshall	6 – Marshall	Acrisure Arena; Palm Springs, California
November 29, 2024*; 4:00 p.m., TruTV	No. 6	vs. Saint Louis; Acrisure Holiday Invitational	W 104–65	6–1	34 – Watkins	12 – Iriafen	4 – Tied	Acrisure Arena (2,725); Palm Springs, California
December 3, 2024*; 6:30 p.m., BTN	No. 6	California Baptist	W 94–52	7–1	40 – Watkins	10 – Tied	6 – von Oelhoffen	Galen Center (2,489); Los Angeles, California
December 7, 2024; 1:00 p.m., BTN	No. 6	at Oregon	W 66–53	8–1 (1–0)	21 – Watkins	12 – Iriafen	4 – Tied	Matthew Knight Arena (7,246); Eugene, Oregon
December 10, 2024*; 6:00 p.m., BTN	No. 5	Fresno State	W 89–40	9–1	24 – Iriafen	13 – Marshall	5 – Watkins	Galen Center (3,081); Los Angeles, California
December 15, 2024*; 12:00 p.m., B1G+	No. 5	Elon	W 88–30	10–1	26 – Watkins	14 – Marshall	5 – Watkins	Galen Center (4,818); Los Angeles, California
December 21, 2024*; 5:00 p.m., FOX	No. 7	at No. 4 UConn	W 72–70	11–1	25 – Watkins	11 – Iriafen	6 – Iriafen	XL Center (15,684); Hartford, CT
December 29, 2024; 7:00 p.m., BTN	No. 4	No. 23 Michigan	W 78–58	12–1 (2–0)	31 – Watkins	9 – Iriafen	7 – Watkins	Galen Center (8,043); Los Angeles, California
January 1, 2025; 12:00 p.m., BTN	No. 4	Nebraska	W 75–55	13–1 (3–0)	26 – Watkins	9 – Marshall	4 – Watkins	Galen Center (5,662); Los Angeles, California
January 5, 2025; 5:00 p.m., BTN	No. 4	at Rutgers	W 92–42	14–1 (4–0)	23 – Watkins	14 – Watkins	6 – von Oelhoffen	Jersey Mike's Arena (7,356); Piscataway, New Jersey
January 8, 2025; 5:30 p.m., FS1	No. 4	at No. 8 Maryland	W 79–74	15–1 (5–0)	21 – Tied	15 – Marshall	4 – Heckel	XFINITY Center (14,735); College Park, Maryland
January 12, 2025; 5:00 p.m., BTN	No. 4	Penn State	W 95–73	16–1 (6–0)	35 – Watkins	11 – Watkins	4 – Tied	Galen Center (5,881); Los Angeles, California
January 15, 2025; 7:00 p.m., Peacock	No. 4	Northwestern	W	16–1 (7–0)	–	–	–	Galen Center; Los Angeles, California
January 19, 2025; 9:00 a.m., NBC	No. 4	at Indiana	W 73–66	17–1 (8–0)	22 – Watkins	10 – Marshall	5 – Smith	Simon Skjodt Assembly Hall (12,534); Bloomington, Indiana
January 22, 2025; 4:00 p.m., Peacock	No. 4	at Purdue	W 79–37	18–1 (9–0)	18 – Howell	13 – Marshall	6 – von Oelhoffen	Mackey Arena (7,543); West Lafayette, Indiana
January 30, 2025; 7:00 p.m., Peacock	No. 4	Minnesota	W 82–69	19–1 (10–0)	23 – Iriafen	11 – Tied	6 – von Oelhoffen	Galen Center (5,243); Los Angeles, California
February 2, 2025; 10:30 a.m., FOX	No. 4	at Iowa	L 69–76	19–2 (10–1)	27 – Watkins	8 – Iriafen	3 – Watkins	Carver-Hawkeye Arena (14,998); Iowa City, Iowa
February 5, 2025; 4:30 p.m., Peacock	No. 7	at Wisconsin	W 86–64	20–2 (11–1)	15 – Iriafen	7 – Marshall	5 – Heckel	Kohl Center (6,285); Madison, Wisconsin
February 8, 2025; 6:00 p.m., FOX	No. 7	No. 8 Ohio State	W 84–63	21–2 (12–1)	24 – Iriafen	13 – Tied	5 – Smith	Galen Center (8,892); Los Angeles, California
February 13, 2025; 7:00 p.m., Peacock	No. 6	No. 1 UCLA; Rivalry	W 71–60	22–2 (13–1)	38 – Watkins	11 – Watkins	5 – Watkins	Galen Center (10,258); Los Angeles, California
February 16, 2025; 4:00 p.m., BTN	No. 6	at Washington	W 69–64	23–2 (14–1)	19 – Iriafen	8 – Watkins	6 – Watkins	Alaska Airlines Arena (7,913); Seattle, Washington
February 19, 2025; 6:30 p.m., Peacock	No. 4	No. 22 Michigan State	W 83–75	24–2 (15–1)	28 – Watkins	12 – Marshall	3 – Tied	Galen Center (5,823); Los Angeles, California
February 23, 2025; 1:00 p.m., FS1	No. 4	No. 25 Illinois; Senior Day	W 76–66	25–2 (16–1)	22 – Tied	13 – Marshall	5 – Marshall	Galen Center (9,021); Los Angeles, California
March 1, 2025; 6:00 p.m., FOX	No. 4	at No. 2 UCLA; Rivalry	W 80–67	26–2 (17–1)	30 – Watkins	9 – Iriafen	5 – Tied	Pauley Pavilion (13,659); Los Angeles, California
Big Ten Women's Tournament
March 7, 2025; 9:00 a.m., BTN	(1) No. 2	vs. (9) Indiana; Quarterfinals	W 84–79	27–2	31 – Watkins	10 – Tied	5 – von Oelhoffen	Gainbridge Fieldhouse; Indianapolis, Indiana
March 8, 2025; 12:00 p.m., BTN	(1) No. 2	vs. (5) Michigan; Semifinals	W 82–70	28–2	25 – Iriafen	12 – Watkins	5 – von Oelhoffen	Gainbridge Fieldhouse; Indianapolis, Indiana
March 9, 2025; 1:30 p.m., CBS	(1) No. 2	vs. (2) No. 4 UCLA; Championship Game/Rivalry	L 67–72	28–3	29 – Watkins	– Smith	4 – Smith	Gainbridge Fieldhouse (8,358); Indianapolis, Indiana
NCAA Tournament
March 22, 2025*; 12:00 p.m., ABC	(1 R4) No. 4	(16 R4) UNC Greensboro; First Round	W 71–25	29–3	22 – Watkins	13 – Iriafen	2 – Tied	Galen Center (6,865); Los Angeles, California
March 24, 2025*; 7:00 p.m., ESPN	(1 R4) No. 4	(9 R4) Mississippi State; Second Round	W 96–59	30–3	36 – Iriafen	9 – Tied	6 – Tied	Galen Center (7,808); Los Angeles, California
March 29, 2025*; 5:00 p.m., ESPN	(1 R4) No. 4	vs. (5 R4) No. 19 Kansas State; Sweet Sixteen	W 67–61	31–3	19 – Smith	9 – Marshall	3 – Marshall	Spokane Arena (10,610); Spokane, Washington
March 31, 2025*; 6:00 p.m., ESPN	(1 S4) No. 4	vs. (2 S4) No. 3 UConn; Elite 8	L 64–78	31–4	23 – Marshall	15 – Marshall	2 – Tied	Spokane Arena (10,141); Spokane, Washington
*Non-conference game. ^{#}Rankings from AP Poll. (#) Tournament seedings in parentheses. All times are in Pacific Time.

Source: USCTrojans.com

=== Spokane regional 4 – Spokane, WA ===
First round Round of 64; March 21–22
1	USC	72
16	UNC Greensboro	25
Los Angeles, California – Sat/Mon
8	California	46
9	Mississippi State	59
5	Kansas State	85
12	Fairfield	41
Lexington, Kentucky – Fri/Sun
4	Kentucky	79
13	Liberty	78
6	Iowa	92
11	Murray State	57
Norman, Oklahoma – Sat/Mon
3	Oklahoma	81
14	Florida Gulf Coast	58
7	Oklahoma State	68
10	South Dakota State	74
Storrs, Connecticut – Sat/Mon
2	UConn	103
15	Arkansas State	34

Second round Round of 32; March 23–24
1	USC	96
9	Mississippi State	59
5	Kansas State	80^{OT}
4	Kentucky	79
6	Iowa	62
3	Oklahoma	96
10	South Dakota State	57
2	UConn	91

Regional semifinals Sweet 16; March 29
1	USC	67
5	Kansas State	61
3	Oklahoma	59
2	UConn	82

Regional Final; Elite 8 March 31
1	USC	64
2	UConn	78

==== Spokane 4 regional final ====
ESPN

March 31
6:00 pm PDT

No. 1 USC Trojans 64, No. 2 UConn Huskies 78
Scoring by quarter: 11–14, 14–25, 21–12, 18–27
Pts: Rayah Marshall (23); Rebs: Rayah Marshall (15); Asts: Tied (2)	Pts: Paige Bueckers (31); Rebs: Sarah Strong (17); Asts: Paige Bueckers (6)

Spokane Arena – Spokane, Washington
Attendance: 10,141
Referees: Maj Forsberg, Roy Gulbeyan, Katie Lukanich

== Game summaries ==
This section will be filled in as the season progresses.

=== No. 20 Ole Miss (Aflac Oui-Play Game) ===
ESPN

November 4th, 2024
9:00 a.m. PST

Recap

No. 20 Ole Miss Rebles 66, No. 3 USC Trojans 68
Scoring by quarter: 16-15, 10-22, 19-15, 21-16
Pts: Deans Kristen – 19; Rebs: Tied – 9 Asts: Madison Scott – 5	Pts: JuJu Watkins – 27; Rebs: Kiki Iriafen – 13; Asts: JuJu Watkins – 4

Adidas Arena • Paris, France
Referees: Infini Robinson, Tiffany Bird, Joe Vaszily

=== vs. Cal Poly ===
B1G+

November 9th, 2024
2:00 p.m. PST

Recap

Cal Poly Mustangs 35, No. 3 USC Trojans 90
Scoring by quarter: 6-40, 11-17, 10-16, 8-17
Pts: Sydney Bourland – 12; Rebs: Sydney Bourland – 6 Asts: Alana Goosby – 3	Pts: Tied – 16; Rebs: Tied – 7 Asts: Talia von Oelhoffen – 7

Galen Center • Los Angeles, California
Attendance: 5,215
Referees: Jamie Broderick, Lisa Jones, Michael McConnell

=== vs. Cal State Northridge ===
BTN+

November 12th, 2024
7:00 p.m. PST

Recap

Cal State Northridge Matadors 39, No. 3 USC Trojans 124
Scoring by quarter: 6-30, 7-30, 7-37, 19-27
Pts: Laini Dahlin – 11; Rebs: Erika Aspajo – 4 Asts: Erika Aspajo – 4	Pts: JuJu Watkins – 21; Rebs: Rayah Marshall – 9 Asts: JuJu Watkins – 9

Galen Center • Los Angeles, California
Attendance: 3,064
Referees: Kim Hobbs, Michael Price, Melissa Barlow

=== vs. Santa Clara ===
BTN+

November 15th, 2024
12:00 p.m. PST

Recap

Santa Clara Broncos 50, No. 3 USC Trojans 81
Scoring by quarter: 13-25, 13-14, 12-22, 12-20
Pts: Kaya Ingram – 13; Rebs: Hannah Rapp – 8 Asts: Madison Naro – 3	Pts: JuJu Watkins – 22; Rebs: Kiki Iriafen – 7 Asts: Talia von Oelhoffen – 6

Galen Center • Los Angeles, California
Attendance: 3,594
Referees: In'Fini Robinson, Kyle Bacon, Roy Gulbeyan

=== vs. No. 6 Notre Dame ===
NBC

November 23rd, 2024
1:00 p.m. PST

Recap

No. 6 Notre Dame Fighting Irish 74, No. 3 USC Trojans 61
Scoring by quarter: 20-10, 15-18, 17-17, 22-16
Pts: Hannah Hidalgo – 24; Rebs: Liatu King – 11; Asts: Hannah Hidalgo – 8	Pts: JuJu Watkins – 24; Rebs: Tied – 9 Asts: JuJu Watkins – 5

Galen Center • Los Angeles, California
Attendance: 7,894
Referees: Chuck Gonzalez, Mai Forsberg, Branda Pantoja

=== Seton Hall (Acrisure Holiday Invitational) ===
TruTV

November 27th, 2024
4:00 p.m. PST

Recap

Seton Hall Pirates 51, No. 6 USC Trojans 84
Scoring by quarter: 13-27, 13-15, 16-20, 9-20
Pts: Faith Masonius – 25; Rebs: Ja'Kahla Craft – 7 Asts: Amari Wright – 5	Pts: JuJu Watkins – 20; Rebs: Rayah Marshall – 11; Asts: Rayah Marshall – 6

Acrisure Arena • Palm Springs, California
Referees: Chaka Wade, Deon Lewis, Robert Scofield

=== Saint Louis (Acrisure Holiday Invitational) ===
TruTV

November 29th, 2024
4:00 p.m. PST

Recap

Saint Louis Billikens 65, No. 6 USC Trojans 104
Scoring by quarter: 15-24, 22-18, 8-37, 20-25
Pts: Mia Bergstrom – 19; Rebs: Tierra Simon – 11; Asts: Tied – 3	Pts: JuJu Watkins – 34; Rebs: Kiki Iriafen – 12; Asts: Tied – 4

Acrisure Arena • Palm Springs, California
Attendance: 2,725
Referees: Chaka Wade, Deon Lewis, Robert Scofield

=== vs. California Baptist ===
BTN

December 3rd, 2024
6:30 p.m. PST

Recap

California Baptist Lancers 52, No. 6 USC Trojans 94
Scoring by quarter: 11-29, 9-21, 16-28, 16-16
Pts: Grace Schmidt – 12; Rebs: Grace Schmidt – 7 Asts: Claudia Fiel – 3	Pts: JuJu Watkins – 40; Rebs: Tied – 10; Asts: Talia von Oelhoffen – 6

Galen Center • Los Angeles, California
Attendance: 2,489
Referees: Sydney Mott, Nadi Carey, Nykesha Thompson

=== at. Oregon ===
BTN

December 7th, 2024
1:00 p.m. PST

Recap

No. 6 USC Trojans 66, Oregon Ducks 53
Scoring by quarter: 12-13, 28-6, 15-22, 11-12
Pts: JuJu Watkins – 21; Rebs: Kiki Iriafen – 12; Asts: Tied – 4	Pts: Deja Kelly – 16; Rebs: Phillipina Kyei – 7 Asts: Tied – 2

Matthew Knight Arena • Eugene, Oregon
Attendance: 7,246
Referees: Chuck Gonzalez, Michol Murray, Lisa Jones

=== vs. Fresno State ===
BTN

December 10th, 2024
6:00 p.m. PST

Recap

Fresno State Bulldogs 40, No. 5 USC Trojans 89
Scoring by quarter: 12-22, 8-24, 6-24, 14-19
Pts: Tied – 11; Rebs: Tied – 4 Asts: Tied – 3	Pts: Kiki Iriafen – 24; Rebs: Rayah Marshall – 13; Asts: JuJu Watkins = 5

Galen Center • Los Angeles, California
Attendance: 3,081
Referees: Brian Woods, Nicole Leon, Roy Gulbeyan

=== vs. Elon ===
BTN+

December 15th, 2024
12:00 p.m. PST

Recap

Elon Phoenix 30, No. 5 USC Trojans' 88
Scoring by quarter: 6-23, 6-17, 11-29, 7-19
Pts: Hannah Dereje – 10; Rebs: Hannah Dereje – 7 Asts: Maraja Pass – 4	Pts: JuJu Watkins – 26; Rebs: Rayah Marshall – 14; Asts: JuJu Watkins – 5

Galen Center • Los Angeles, California
Attendance: 4,818
Referees: Genesis Perrymound, Cameron Inouye, Michael Price

=== at. No. 4 UConn ===
FOX

December 21st, 2024
5:00 p.m. PST

Recap

No. 7 USC Trojans 72, No. 4 UConn Huskies 70
Scoring by quarter: 24-15, 18-14, 13-20, 17-21
Pts: JuJu Watkins – 25; Rebs: Kiki Iriafen – 11; Asts: Kiki Iriafen – 6	Pts: Tied – 22; Rebs: Sarah Strong – 13; Asts: Sarah Strong – 5

XL Center • Hartford, Connecticut
Attendance: 15,684
Referees: Jeffrey Smith, Katie Lukanich, Karen Preato

=== vs. No. 23 Michigan ===
BTN

December 29th, 2024
7:00 p.m. PST

Report

No. 23 Michigan Wolverines 58, No. 4 USC Trojans 78
Scoring by quarter: 11-17, 20-17, 16-23, 11-21
Pts: Jordan Hobbs – 19; Rebs: Brooke Daniels – 7 Asts: Mila Holloway – 5	Pts: JuJu Watkins – 31; Rebs: Kiki Iriafen – 9 Asts: JuJu Watkins – 7

Galen Center • Los Angeles, California
Attendance: 8,043
Referees: Nicole Leon, Doug Knight, Michol Murray

=== vs. Nebraska ===
BTN

January 1st, 2025
12:00 p.m. PST

Recap

Nebraska Cornhuskers 55, No. 4 USC Trojans 75
Scoring by quarter: 12-16, 22-23, 11-20, 10-16
Pts: Logan Nissley – 14; Rebs: Alexis Markowski – 9 Asts: Britt Prince – 4	Pts: JuJu Watkins – 26; Rebs: Rayah Marshall – 9 Asts: JuJu Watkins – 4

Galen Center • Los Angeles, California
Attendance: 5,662
Referees: Kim Hobbs, In'Fini Robinson, Michael Price

=== at. Rutgers ===
BTN

January 5th, 2025
5:00 p.m. PST

Recap

No. 4 USC Trojans 92, Rutgers Scarlet Knights 42
Scoring by quarter: 22-8, 15-6, 32-10, 23-18
Pts: JuJu Watkins – 23; Rebs: JuJu Watkins – 14; Asts: Talia von Oelhoffen – 6	Pts: JoJo Lacey – 14; Rebs: Destiny Adams – 10; Asts: Destiny Adams – 3

Jersey Mike's Arena • Piscataway, New Jersey
Attendance: 7,356
Referees: Ken Nash, Angie Enlund, Julie Krommenhoek

=== at. No. 8 Maryland ===
FS1

January 8th, 2025
5:30 p.m. PST

Recap

No. 4 USC Trojans 79, No. 8 Maryland Terrapins 74
Scoring by quarter: 18-20, 17-14, 23-24, 21-16
Pts: Tied – 21; Rebs: Rayah Marshall – 15; Asts: Kayleigh Heckel – 4	Pts: Shyanne Sellers – 26; Rebs: Saylor Poffenbarger – 17; Asts: Tied – 2

XFINTIY Center • College Park, Maryland
Attendance: 14,735
Referees: Natasha Camy, Michol Murray, Michael McConnell

=== vs. Penn State ===
BTN

January 12th, 2025
5:00 p.m. PST

Recap

Penn State Lady Lions 73, No. 4 USC Trojans 95
Scoring by quarter: 18-27, 13-29, 21-20, 21-19
Pts: Talayah Walker – 18; Rebs: Grace Hall – 9 Asts: Tied – 4	Pts: JuJu Watkins – 35; Rebs: JuJu Watkins – 11; Asts: Tied – 4

Galen Center • Los Angeles, California
Attendance: 5,881
Referees: Cameron Inouye, Brenda Pantoja, Felicia Grinter

=== vs. Northwestern ===
Due to the wildfires in the Los Angeles and Ventura County, the Northwestern road games at UCLA on January 12 and USC on January 15 were postponed. Northwestern forfeited the games in February 2025. UCLA and USC each were credited with a win, and the Wildcats were assessed two losses.

=== at. Indiana ===
NBC

January 19th, 2025
9:00 a.m. PST

Recap

No. 4 USC Trojans 73, Indiana Hoosiers 66
Scoring by quarter: 14-19, 24-13, 13-18, 22-16
Pts: JuJu Watkins – 22; Rebs: Rayah Marshall – 10; Asts: Kennedy Smith – 5	Pts: Sydney Parrish – 16; Rebs: Sydney Parrish – 10; Asts: Yarden Garzon – 6

Simon Skjodt Assembly Hall • Bloomington, Indiana
Attendance: 12,534
Referees: Nykesha Thomason, Lisa Jones, Gina Cross

=== at. Purdue ===
Peacock

January 22nd, 2025
4:00 p.m. PST

Recap

Purdue Boilermakers 37, No. 4 USC Trojans 79
Scoring by quarter: 15-16, 31-2, 19-10, 14-9
Pts: Kendall Puryear – 10; Rebs: Layden, Mckenna – 7 Asts: Layden Mckenna – 3	Pts: Avery Howell – 18; Rebs: Rayah Marshall -13; Asts: Talia Von Oelhoffen – 6

Galen Center • Los Angeles, California
Attendance: 7,543
Referees: Erika Herriman, Natasha Camy, Michae McConnell

=== vs. Minnesota ===
Peacock

January 30th, 2025
7:00 p.m. PST

Recap

Minnesota Golden Gophers 69, No. 4 USC Trojans 82
Scoring by quarter: 15-25, 13-15, 21-24, 20-18
Pts: Sophie Hart – 18; Rebs: Sophie Hart – 8 Asts: Garce Grochoski – 4	Pts: Kiki Iriafen – 23; Rebs: Tied – 11; Asts: Talia Von Oelhoffen – 6

Galen Center • Los Angeles, California
Attendance: 5,243
Referees: Nicole Leon, Ify Seales, Julie Krommenhoek

=== at. Iowa ===
FOX

February 2nd, 2025
10:30 a.m. PST

Recaps

No. 4 USC Trojans 69, Iowa Hawkeyes 76
Scoring by quarter: 4-18, 25-10, 21-23, '19-25
Pts: JuJu Watkins – 27; Rebs: Kiki Iriafen – 8 Asts: JuJu Watkins – 3	Pts: Lucy Olsen – 28; Rebs: Sydney Affolter – 9 Asts: Tied – 4

Carver-Hawkeye Arena • Iowa City, Iowa
Attendance: 14,998
Referees: Doug Knight, Nykesha Thompson, Kevin Pethtel

=== at. Wisconsin ===
Peacock

February 5, 2025
4:30 p.m. PST

Recap

No. 7 USC Trojans 86, Wisconsin Badgers 64
Scoring by quarter: 17-12, 22-16, 23-19, 24-17
Pts: Kiki Iriafen – 15; Rebs: Rayah Marshall – 7 Asts: Kayleigh Heckel – 5	Pts: Serah Williams – 19; Rebs: Carter Mccray – 11; Asts: Ronnie Porter – 4

Kohl Center • Madison, Wisconsin
Attendance: 6,285
Referees: Tiara Cruse, Angelica Suffren, Chuck Gonzalez

=== vs. Ohio State ===
FOX

February 8, 2025
6:00 p.m. PST

Recap

No. 8 Ohio State Buckeyes 63, No. 7 USC Trojans 84
Scoring by quarter: 11-14, 15-20, 19-25, 18-25
Pts: Taylor Thierry – 14; Rebs: Tied – 5 Asts: Ajae Petty – 4	Pts: Kiki Iriafen – 24; Rebs: Tied – 13; Asts: Kennedy Smith – 5

Galen Center • Los Angeles, California
Attendance: 8,892
Referees: Ken Nash, Julie Krommenhock, Michael McConnell

=== vs. UCLA (Rivalry) ===
Peacock

February 13, 2025
7:00 p.m. PST

Recap

No. 1 UCLA Bruins 60, No. 6 USC Trojans 71
Scoring by quarter: 15-24, 20-14, 17-9, 8-24
Pts: Lauren Betts – 18; Rebs: Lauren Betts – 13; Asts: Kiki Rice – 8	Pts: JuJu Watkins – 38; Rebs: JuJu Watkins – 11; Asts: JuJu Watkins – 5

Galen Center • Los Angeles, California
Attendance: 10,258
Referees: Michol Murray, Brenda Pantoja, Felicia Grinter

=== at. Washington ===
BTN

February 16, 2025
4:00 p.m. PST

Recap

No. 6 USC Trojans 69, Washington Huskies 64
Scoring by quarter: 14-15, 9-8, 16-20, 30-21
Pts: Kiki Iriafen – 19; Rebs: JuJu Watkins – 8 Asts: JuJu Watkins – 6	Pts: Sayvia Sellers – 24; Rebs: Hannah Stiners – 10; Asts: Sayvia Sellers – 3

Alaska Airlines Arena • Seattle, Washington
Attendance: 7,913
Referees: Ken Nash, Teresa Turner, Maj Forsberg

=== vs. Michigan State ===
Peacock

February 19, 2025
6:30 p.m. PST

Recap

No. 22 Michigan State Spartans 75, No. 4 USC Trojans 83
Scoring by quarter: 16-24, 15-17, 18-27, 26-15
Pts: Grace Vanslooten – 29; Rebs: Julia Ayrault – 10; Asts: Tied – 3	Pts: JuJu Watkins – 28; Rebs: Rayah Marshall – 12; Asts: Tied – 3

Galen Center • Los Angeles, California
Attendance: 5,823
Referees: Kevin Pethel, Lisa Jones, Gina Cross

=== vs. Illinois (Senior Day) ===
FS1

February 23, 2025
1:00 p.m. PST

Recap

No. 25 Illinois Fighting Illini 66, No. 4 USC Trojans 77
Scoring by quarter: 22-26, 14-14, 11-17, 19-19
Pts: Genesis Bryant – 22; Rebs: Kendall Bostic – 16; Asts: Kendall Bostic – 5	Pts: Tied – 22; Rebs: Rayah Marshall – 13; Asts: Rayah Marshall – 5

Galen Center • Los Angeles, California
Attendance: 9,021
Referees: Nicole Leon, Natasha Curry, In'Fini Robinson

=== at. UCLA (Rivalry) ===
FOX

March 1, 2025
6:00 p.m. PST

Recap

No. 4 USC Trojans 80, No. 2 UCLA Bruins 67
Scoring by quarter: 23-20, 23-12, 18-19, 16-16
Pts: JuJu Watkins – 30; Rebs: Kiki Iriafen – 9 Asts: Tied – 5	Pts: Kiki Rice – 16; Rebs: Lauren Betts – 11; Asts: Kiki Rice – 6

Pauley Pavilion • Los Angeles, California
Attendance: 13,659
Referees: Chuck Gonzalez, Maj Forsberg, Lisa Jones

== Big Ten Tournament ==
=== (9) Indiana (Quarterfinals) ===
BTN

March 7, 2025
12:00 p.m. EST

Recap

(1) No. 2 USC Trojans 84, (9) Indiana Hoosiers 79
Scoring by quarter: 23-18, 15-16, 21-23, 25-22
Pts: JuJu Watkins – 31; Rebs: Tied – 10; Asts: Talia Von Oelhoffen – 5	Pts: Yarden Garzon – 16; Rebs: Tied – 8 Asts: Chloe Moore-Mcneil – 7

Gainbridge Fieldhouse • Indianapolis, Indiana
Attendance: 7,352
Referees: Roy Gulbeyan, Angie Enlund, Michol Murray

=== (5) Michigan (Semifinals) ===
BTN

March 8, 2025
3:00 p.m. EST

Recap

(1) No 2. USC Trojans 82, (5) Michigan Wolverines 70
'Scoring by quarter: 12-15, 17-16, 24-21, 29-18
Pts: Kiki Iriafen – 25; Rebs: Tied – 11; Asts: Talia Von Oelhoffen – 5	Pts: Syla Swords – 26; Rebs: Olivia Olson – 9 Asts: Olivia Olson – 4

Gainbridge Fieldhouse • Indianapolis, Indiana
Attendance: 9,761
Referees: Gina Cross, Felicia Grinter, Lisa Jones

=== (2) No. 4 UCLA (Championship Game/Rivalry) ===
CBS

March 9, 2025
1:30 p.m. EST

Recap

(1) No. 2 USC Trojans 67, (2) No. 4 UCLA Bruins 72
Scoring by quarter: 24-19, 21-16, 9-17, 13-20
Pts: JuJu Watkins – 29; Rebs: Kennedy Smith – 8 Asts: Kennedy Smith – 5	Pts: Lauren Betts – 17; Rebs: Janiah Barker – 6 Asts: Kiki Rice – 8

Gainbridge Fieldhouse • Indianapolis, Indiana
Attendance: 8,358
Referees: Mike Reed, Deldre Carr, Jason Phillips

== NCAA Tournament ==
=== (16) vs UNC Greensboro (First Round) ===
CBS

March 22, 2025
12:00 p.m. PST

Recap

(16) UNC Greensboro Spartans 25, (1) USC Trojans 71
Scoring by quarter: 8-12, 3-16, 5-25, 9-18
Pts: Nya Smith – 7 Rebs: Tied – 7 Asts: Tied — 2	Pts: JuJu Watkins – 22; Rebs: Kiki Iriafen – 13; Asts: Tied – 2

Galen Center • Los Angeles, California
Attendance: 6,865
Referees: Michol Murray, Teresa Turner, Daniel Drake

=== (9) vs Mississippi State (Second Round) ===
ESPN

March 24, 2025
7:00 p.m. PST

Recap

(9) Mississippi State Bulldogs 59, (1) USC Trojans 96
Scoring by quarter: 8-28, 19-22, 15-25, 17-21
Pts: Jerkalia Jordan – 17; Rebs: Tied – 6 Asts: Destiney McPhaul – 3	Pts: Kiki Iriafen – 36; Rebs: Tied – 9 Asts: Tied – 6

Galen Center • Los Angeles, California
Attendance: 7,808
Referees: Chuck Gonzalez, Michol Murray, and Saif Esho

=== (5) Kansas State (Sweet Sixteen) ===
ESPN

March 29, 2025
5:00 p.m. EST

Recap

(1) USC Trojans 67, (5) Kansas State Wildcats 61
Scoring by quarter: 16-9, 12-21, 20-15, 19-16
Pts: Kennedy Smith – 19; Rebs: Rayah Marshall – 9 Asts: Rayah Marshall – 3	Pts: Serena Sundell – 22; Rebs: Ayoka Lee – 10; Asts: Serena Sundell – 6

Spokane Arena • Spokane, Washington
Attendance: 10,610
Referees: Cameron Inouye, Julie Krommenhoek, Kyle Bacon

== Rankings ==
Ranking movements Legend: ██ Increase in ranking ██ Decrease in ranking ( ) = First-place votes
	Week																				
Poll	Pre	1	2	3	4	5	6	7	8	9	10	11	12	13	14	15	16	17	18	19	Final
AP	3 (1)	3	3	6	6	5	7	4	4	4	4	4	4	7	6	4	4 (1)	2 (6)	4	4	5
Coaches	3 (1)	3 (1)	3 (1)	6	6	5	7	5	5	5	5	5	4	7	6	4	3 (1)	2 (1)	4	4	5

== See also ==
- 2024–25 USC Trojans men's basketball team

== Awards and honors ==
- JuJu Watkins was the consensus player of the year, winning John R Wooden award, the Naismith National Player of the Year, and the Associated Press National Player of the Year.
