= 2024–25 Michigan Wolverines women's basketball team =

Intercollegiate basketball season

2024–25 Michigan Wolverines women's basketball

Fort Myers Tip-Off Shell Division champions

NCAA tournament, Second round
- Conference: Big Ten Conference

Ranking
- AP: No. 25
- Record: 23–11 (11–7 Big Ten)
- Head coach: Kim Barnes Arico (13th season)
- Assistant coaches: Melanie Moore; Justine Raterman; Jillian Dunston; Natalie Achonwa
- Home arena: Crisler Center

2024–25 Big Ten women's basketball standings
	Conf.				Overall
Team	W		L	PCT	W		L	PCT
No. 5 USC	17	–	1	.944	31	–	4	.886
No. 3 UCLA †	16	–	2	.889	34	–	3	.919
No. 19 Ohio State	13	–	5	.722	26	–	7	.788
No. 12 Maryland	13	–	5	.722	25	–	8	.758
No. 25 Michigan	11	–	7	.611	23	–	11	.676
Michigan State	11	–	7	.611	22	–	10	.688
Illinois	11	–	7	.611	22	–	10	.688
Oregon	10	–	8	.556	20	–	12	.625
Indiana	10	–	8	.556	20	–	13	.606
Nebraska	10	–	8	.556	21	–	12	.636
Iowa	10	–	8	.556	23	–	11	.676
Washington	9	–	9	.500	19	–	14	.576
Minnesota	8	–	10	.444	25	–	11	.694
Wisconsin	4	–	14	.222	13	–	17	.433
Rutgers	3	–	15	.167	13	–	20	.394
Purdue	3	–	15	.167	10	–	19	.345
Northwestern	2	–	16	.111	9	–	18	.333
Penn State	1	–	17	.056	10	–	19	.345
† 2025 Big Ten tournament winner As of April 7, 2025; Rankings from AP poll

The 2024–25 Michigan Wolverines women's basketball team represented the University of Michigan during the 2024–25 NCAA Division I women's basketball season. The Wolverines were led by head coach Kim Barnes Arico in her thirteenth year, and played their home games at the Crisler Center in Ann Arbor, Michigan. This season marked the program's 43rd season as a member of the Big Ten Conference.

== Previous season ==
The Wolverines finished the 2023–24 season with a 20–14 record, including 9–9 in Big Ten play to finish in sixth place. They were ranked the No. 9 seed in the 2024 NCAA Tournament, and were eliminated in the first round by Kansas in overtime.

== Offseason ==
On May 21, 2024, Justine Raterman was named an assistant coach at Michigan, replacing the departing Harry Rafferty.

Michigan had six players enter the transfer portal, the most notable transfer was All-Big Ten first-team junior guard, Laila Phelia. Michigan signed the ESPN-ranked number 4 recruiting class consisting of five incoming freshmen, the highest-ranked class in program history.

=== Departures ===
Michigan Departures
Name	Number	Pos.	Weight	Year	Hometown	Reason for departure
Elissa Brett	0	G	6'0"	Graduate	Adelaide, Australia	Graduated
Lauren Hansen	1	G	5'9"	Graduate	Long Island, NY	Graduated
Laila Phelia	5	G	6'0"	Junior	Cincinnati, OH	Transferred to Texas
Taylor Woodson	21	F	6'0"	Freshman	Minnetonka, MN	Transferred to Minnesota
Chyra Evans	22	F	6'2"	Sophomore	Newcastle, Australia	Transferred to Utah
Whitney Sollom	25	F	6'4"	Senior	Hartland, MI	Graduated
Elise Stuck	30	G/F	6'1"	Senior	Charlevoix, MI	Transferred to Ball State
Taylor Williams	33	F	6'2"	Graduate	New Baltimore, MI	Transferred to Northwestern
Cameron Williams	44	F	6'3"	Senior	Chicago, IL	Transferred to Miami

=== Acquisitions ===
Michigan incoming transfers
Name	Pos.	Height	Year	Hometown	Previous team
Brooke Q. Daniels	G	5'7"	JR	Macomb, MI	Oakland
Iuliia Grabovskaia	C	6'5"	JR	Rostov-on-Don, Russia	Middle Tennessee
Ally VanTimmeren	F	6'2"	GS	Allendale, MI	Boston College

=== Recruiting class ===
College recruiting
Name	Hometown	School	Height	Weight	Commit date
Syla Swords; G	Sudbury, Ontario	Long Island Lutheran	6 ft 0 in (1.83 m)	N/A	
Syla Swords; G	Recruit ratings: ESPN: (98)				
Olivia Olson; G	New Hope, MN	Benilde-St. Margaret's	6 ft 1 in (1.85 m)	N/A	
Olivia Olson; G	Recruit ratings: ESPN: (96)				
Mila Holloway; G	Charlotte, NC	Legacy Early College	5 ft 10 in (1.78 m)	N/A	
Mila Holloway; G	Recruit ratings: ESPN:				
Aaiyanna Dunbar; F	Murfreesboro, TN	Blackman	6 ft 2 in (1.88 m)	N/A	
Aaiyanna Dunbar; F	Recruit ratings: ESPN:				
Te'Yala Delfosse; F	Ewing, NJ	Ewing	6 ft 3 in (1.91 m)	N/A	
Te'Yala Delfosse; F	Recruit ratings: ESPN:				
Overall recruit ranking:
Note: In many cases, Scout, Rivals, 247Sports, On3, and ESPN may conflict in their listings of height and weight.; In these cases, the average was taken. ESPN grades are on a 100-point scale.; Sources: "2024 Michigan Wolverines Recruiting Class". ESPN. Archived from the original on September 21, 2024.

== Roster ==
2024–25 Michigan Wolverines women's basketball team
Players
Coaches

Pos.	#	Name	Height	Year	Previous school	Hometown
G	1	Olivia Olson	6 ft 1 in (1.85 m)	Fr	Benilde-St. Margaret's	New Hope, MN
G	2	Macy Brown	5 ft 8 in (1.73 m)	So	East Grand Rapids HS	East Grand Rapids, MI
G	3	Mila Holloway	5 ft 10 in (1.78 m)	Fr	Legacy Early College	Charlotte, NC
G	5	Brooke Q. Daniels	5 ft 7 in (1.7 m)	Jr	Oakland	Macomb, MI
G	10	Jordan Hobbs	6 ft 3 in (1.91 m)	Sr	Springboro HS	Springboro, OH
G	11	Greta Kampschroeder	6 ft 0 in (1.83 m)	Sr	Naperville North HS	Naperville, IL
G	12	Syla Swords	6 ft 0 in (1.83 m)	Fr	Long Island Lutheran HS	Sudbury, ON
F	20	Alyssa Crockett	6 ft 2 in (1.88 m)	Jr	Westfield HS	Westfield, IN
F	21	Ally VanTimmeren	6 ft 2 in (1.88 m)	GS	Boston College	Allendale, MI
F	33	Te'Yala Delfosse	6 ft 3 in (1.91 m)	Fr	Ewing HS	Ewing, NJ
F	34	Aaiyanna Dunbar	6 ft 2 in (1.88 m)	Fr	Blackman HS	Murfreesboro, TN
C	55	Iuliia Grabovskaia	6 ft 5 in (1.96 m)	Jr	Middle Tennessee	Rostov-on-Don, Russia

Head coach

- Kim Barnes Arico (alum: Montclair State)

Assistant coach(es)

- Melanie Moore (Siena)
- Justine Raterman (Dayton)
- Jillian Dunston (Michigan)
- Natalie Achonwa (Notre Dame

Legend

- (C) Team captain
- (S) Suspended
- (I) Ineligible
- (W) Walk-on
- Injured
- Current redshirt

Roster

== Schedule and results ==
Date time, TV	Rank^{#}	Opponent^{#}	Result	Record	Site (attendance) city, state
Exhibition
October 27, 2024*; 1:00 p.m.		Northwood	W 81–52	–	Crisler Center (1,034); Ann Arbor, MI
Regular season
November 4, 2024*; 7:30 p.m., TNT		vs. No. 1 South Carolina; Hall of Fame Series	L 62–68	0–1	T-Mobile Arena; Las Vegas, NV
November 8, 2024*; 7:00 p.m., B1G+		Lehigh	W 86–55	1–1	Crisler Center (2,747); Ann Arbor, MI
November 14, 2024*; 7:00 p.m., B1G+		Central Michigan	W 99–62	2–1	Crisler Center (2,423); Ann Arbor, MI
November 17, 2024*; 12:00 p.m., B1G+		Oakland	W 88–42	3–1	Crisler Center (2,643); Ann Arbor, MI
November 20, 2024*; 5:30 p.m., B1G+		LIU	W 96–31	4–1	Crisler Center (2,012); Ann Arbor, MI
November 24, 2024; 2:00 p.m., B1G+		Long Beach State	W 111–56	5–1	Crisler Center (2,753); Ann Arbor, MI
November 29, 2024*; 2:00 p.m., WSN		vs. Belmont; Fort Myers Tip-Off Shell Division semifinals	W 68–58	6–1	Suncoast Credit Union Arena (787); Fort Myers, FL
November 30, 2024*; 7:30 p.m., WSN		vs. Virginia Tech; Fort Myers Tip-Off Shell Division championship	W 76–65	7–1	Suncoast Credit Union Arena (573); Fort Myers, FL
December 8, 2024; 2:00 p.m., B1G+	No. 23	Northwestern	W 60–54	8–1 (1–0)	Crisler Center (3,636); Ann Arbor, MI
December 14, 2024*; 3:00 p.m., B1G+	No. 20	Detroit	W 100–54	9–1	Crisler Center (3,423); Ann Arbor, MI
December 17, 2024; 9:30 p.m., ESPN2	No. 20	vs. No. 10 Oklahoma; Jumpman Invitational	L 62–72	9–2	Spectrum Center (16,058); Charlotte, NC
December 20, 2024*; 12:00 p.m., ESPN+	No. 20	at Akron	W 96–55	10–2	James A. Rhodes Arena (1,156); Akron, OH
December 29, 2024; 10:00 p.m., BTN	No. 23	at No. 4 USC	L 58–78	10–3 (1–1)	Galen Center (8,043); Los Angeles, CA
January 1, 2025; 5:00 p.m., BTN	No. 24	at No. 1 UCLA	L 70–86	10–4 (1–2)	Pauley Pavilion (4,566); Los Angeles, CA
January 8, 2025; 7:00 p.m., B1G+	No. 25	No. 9 Ohio State; Rivalry	L 77–84	10–5 (1–3)	Crisler Center (5,112); Ann Arbor, MI
January 11, 2025; 2:00 p.m., B1G+	No. 25	at Purdue	W 87–60	11–5 (2–3)	Mackey Arena (9,231); West Lafayette, IN
January 15, 2025; 7:00 p.m., B1G+		Washington	W 82–69	12–5 (3–3)	Crisler Center (2,687); Ann Arbor, MI
January 18, 2025; 12:00 p.m., BTN		Rutgers	W 87–71	13–5 (4–3)	Crisler Center (4,683); Ann Arbor, MI
January 22, 2025; 8:00 p.m., B1G+	No. 24	at No. 23 Minnesota	W 70–65	14–5 (5–3)	Williams Arena (4,344); Minneapolis, MN
January 25, 2025; 12:00 p.m., BTN	No. 24	No. 21 Michigan State; Rivalry	L 58–88	14–6 (5–4)	Crisler Center (10,873); Ann Arbor, MI
January 29, 2025; 7:30 p.m., B1G+		at Wisconsin	L 75–82	14–7 (5–5)	Kohl Center (4,023); Madison, WI
February 2, 2025; 12:00 p.m., B1G+		Oregon	W 80–48	15–7 (6–5)	Crisler Center (4,306); Ann Arbor, MI
February 6, 2025; 8:00 p.m., Peacock		at Nebraska	W 78–60	16–7 (7–5)	Pinnacle Bank Arena (5,617); Lincoln, NE
February 9, 2025; 2:00 p.m., FS1		at No. 20 Michigan State; Rivalry	W 71–61	17–7 (8–5)	Breslin Student Events Center (11,043); East Lansing, MI
February 12, 2025; 7:00 p.m., B1G+		Indiana	W 70–67	18–7 (9–5)	Crisler Center (2,677); Ann Arbor, MI
February 17, 2025; 6:00 p.m., BTN		at No. 21 Maryland	L 77–85	18–8 (9–6)	Xfinity Center (7,049); College Park, MD
February 22, 2025; 12:00 p.m., BTN		Penn State	W 78–68	19–8 (10–6)	Crisler Center (4,758); Ann Arbor, MI
February 26, 2025; 7:00 p.m., B1G+		Iowa	L 66–79	19–9 (10–7)	Crisler Center (4,082); Ann Arbor, MI
March 2, 2025; 1:30 p.m., BTN		at Illinois	W 78–69	20–9 (11–7)	State Farm Center (6,889); Champaign, IL
Big Ten Women's Tournament
March 6, 2025; 2:30 p.m., BTN	(5)	vs. (12) Washington; Second Round	W 66–58	21–9	Gainbridge Fieldhouse (7,028); Indianapolis, IN
March 7, 2025; 2:20 p.m., BTN	(5)	vs. (4) No. 15 Maryland; Quarterfinal	W 98–71	22–9	Gainbridge Fieldhouse (7,352); Indianapolis, IN
March 8, 2025; 3:00 p.m., BTN	(5)	vs. (1) No. 2 USC; Semifinal	L 70–82	22–10	Gainbridge Fieldhouse (7,805); Indianapolis, IN
NCAA Women's Tournament
March 21, 2025*; 11:30 a.m., ESPN2	(6 B3)	vs. (11 B3) Iowa State; First Round	W 80–74	23–10	Joyce Center; Notre Dame, IN
March 23, 2025*; 1:00 p.m., ABC	(6 B3)	at (3 B3) No. 18 Notre Dame; Second Round	L 55–76	23–11	Joyce Center (8,505); Notre Dame, IN
*Non-conference game. ^{#}Rankings from AP poll. (#) Tournament seedings in parentheses. B3=Birmingham 3. All times are in Eastern Time. Source:

== Awards and honors ==
Weekly Awards
Player	Award	Date Awarded	Ref.
Syla Swords	Big Ten Freshman of the Week	November 11, 2024	
Mila Holloway	Big Ten Freshman of the Week	November 18, 2024	
Syla Swords	Big Ten Freshman of the Week	December 2, 2024	
Olivia Olson	Big Ten Freshman of the Week	December 9, 2024	
Olivia Olson	Big Ten Freshman of the Week	February 3, 2025	
Syla Swords	Big Ten Freshman of the Week	February 10, 2025	

Player	Award	Ref
Olivia Olson	Co-Big Ten Freshman of the Year	
Olivia Olson	Second-team All-Big Ten	
Syla Swords	Second-team All-Big Ten	
Olivia Olson	Big Ten All-Freshman team	
Syla Swords	Big Ten All-Freshman team	
Jordan Hobbs	All-Big Ten honorable mention	
Mila Holloway	All-Big Ten honorable mention	
Syla Swords	Big Ten All-Tournament team	
Syla Swords	Freshman All-American team (ESPN)	

== Rankings ==
Ranking movements Legend: ██ Increase in ranking ██ Decrease in ranking — = Not ranked RV = Received votes
	Week																				
Poll	Pre	1	2	3	4	5	6	7	8	9	10	11	12	13	14	15	16	17	18	19	Final
AP	—	RV	RV	RV	23	20	20	23	24	25	RV	24	RV	RV	RV	RV	—	—	RV	RV	25
Coaches	RV	RV	RV	RV	RV	RV	25	25	RV	RV	RV	RV	RV	—	RV	—	—	—	—	—	RV
