= 2024 McDonald's All-American Girls Game =

Basketball game

West	East
74	98
- Date: April 2, 2024
- Venue: Toyota Center, Houston, Texas
- MVP: Sarah Strong & Joyce Edwards
- Network: ESPN

McDonald's All-American

The 2024 McDonald's All-American Girls Game was an all-star basketball game played on April 2, 2024, at Toyota Center in Houston, Texas. The game's rosters featured the best and most highly recruited high school girls graduating in the class of 2024. The game was the 22nd annual version of the McDonald's All-American Game first played in 2002. The 24 players were selected from over 700 nominees by a committee of basketball experts. They were chosen not only for their on-court skills, but for their performances off the court as well.

== Rosters ==
The roster was announced on January 23, 2024. USC and UConn had the most selections with three, while Florida, Michigan, South Carolina, Texas and UCLA each had two.

=== Team East ===
ESPNW 100 Rank	Name	Height	Position	Hometown	High school	College choice
10	Mikayla Blakes	6–0	G	Somerset, New Jersey	Rutgers Preparatory School	Vanderbilt
14	Kendall Dudley	6–2	F	Centreville, Virginia	Sidwell Friends School	UCLA
2	Joyce Edwards	6–2	F	Camden, South Carolina	Camden High School	South Carolina
28	Kayleigh Heckel	5–9	PG	Port Chester, New York	Long Island Lutheran	USC
17	Zamareya Jones	5–7	PG	Bethel, North Carolina	North Pitt High School	NC State
5	Kate Koval	6–4	C	Brookville, New York	Long Island Lutheran	Notre Dame
12	Madisen McDaniel	5–9	PG	Upper Marlboro, Maryland	Bishop McNamara High School	South Carolina
15	Olivia Olson	6–1	W	St. Louis Park, Minnesota	Benilde-St. Margaret's	Michigan
27	Zania Socka-Nguemen	6–3	F	Washington, D.C.	Sidwell Friends School	UCLA
1	Sarah Strong	6–2	F	Fuquay-Varina, North Carolina	Grace Christian Sanford	UConn
11	Syla Swords	6–0	G	Sudbury, Ontario	Long Island Lutheran	Michigan
20	Berry Wallace	6–1	W	Pickerington, Ohio	Pickerington High School Central	Illinois

=== Team West ===
ESPNW 100 Rank	Name	Height	Position	Hometown	High school	College choice
13	Imari Berry	5–10	G	Clarksville, Tennessee	Clarksville High School	Clemson
3	Jaloni Cambridge	5–6	PG	Nashville, Tennessee	Montverde Academy	Ohio State
7	Justice Carlton	6–2	F	Katy, Texas	Seven Lakes High School	Texas
18	Morgan Cheli	6–2	G	San Jose, California	Archbishop Mitty High School	UConn
23	Avery Howell	5–11	G	Boise, Idaho	Boise High School	USC
8	Jordan Lee	6–0	G	Stockton, California	St. Mary's High School	Texas
16	Alivia McGill	5–9	PG	Coon Rapids, Minnesota	Hopkins High School	Florida
33	Me'Arah O'Neal	6–3	C	Houston, Texas	Episcopal High School	Florida
21	Mackenly Randolph	6–0	F	Chatsworth, California	Sierra Canyon School	
19	Arianna Roberson	6–4	F	San Antonio, Texas	Clark High School	Duke
6	Kennedy Smith	6–1	W	Etiwanda, California	Etiwanda High School	USC
4	Allie Ziebell	5–10	G	Neenah, Wisconsin	Neenah High School	UConn
