= Olivia Olson (basketball) =

American basketball player (born 2005)

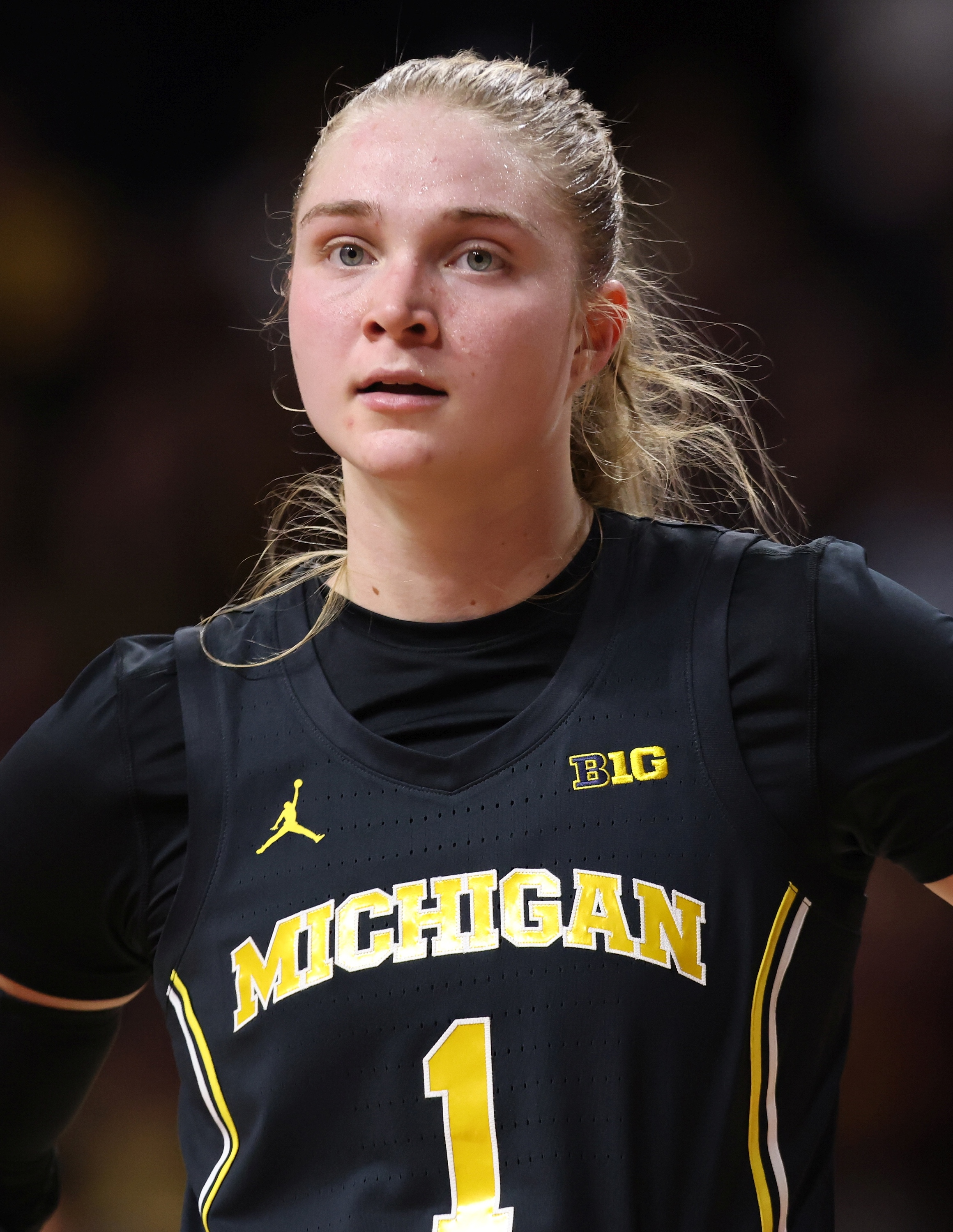
- Olson with the Michigan Wolverines in 2025

No. 1 – Michigan Wolverines
- Position: Guard
- League: Big Ten Conference

Personal information
- Born: November 2, 2005 (age 21)
- Listed height: 6 ft 1 in (1.85 m)

Career information
- High school: Benilde-St. Margaret's (St. Louis Park, Minnesota)
- College: Michigan (2024–present)

Career highlights
- Second-team All-American – ESPN, NYT (2026); Third-team All-American – AP, USBWA, TSN (2026); Co-Big Ten Freshman of the Year (2025); First-team All-Big Ten (2026); Second-team All-Big Ten (2025); Big Ten All-Freshman Team (2025); McDonald's All-American (2024); Nike Hoop Summit (2024); Minnesota Miss Basketball (2024)
Medals
Women's basketball
Representing the United States
FIBA Under-16 Americas Championship
| Gold medal – first place | 2021 Mexico | Team |

Olivia Olson (born November 2, 2005) is an American college basketball player for the Michigan Wolverines of the Big Ten Conference. She was the Co-Big Ten Freshman of the Year in 2025, and an All-American in 2026.

In high school, Olson was a five-star recruit in the 2024 class, and represented the United States national team at the 2021 FIBA Under-16 Women's Americas Championship and the Nike Hoop Summit. In 2023, she won Minnesota state championships as a senior goalkeeper in soccer and as a junior guard in basketball for Benilde-St. Margaret's. Olson won back-to-back state titles in basketball in 2024, earning Minnesota Miss Basketball, Minnesota Gatorade Player of the Year and was a McDonald's All-American.

== High school career ==
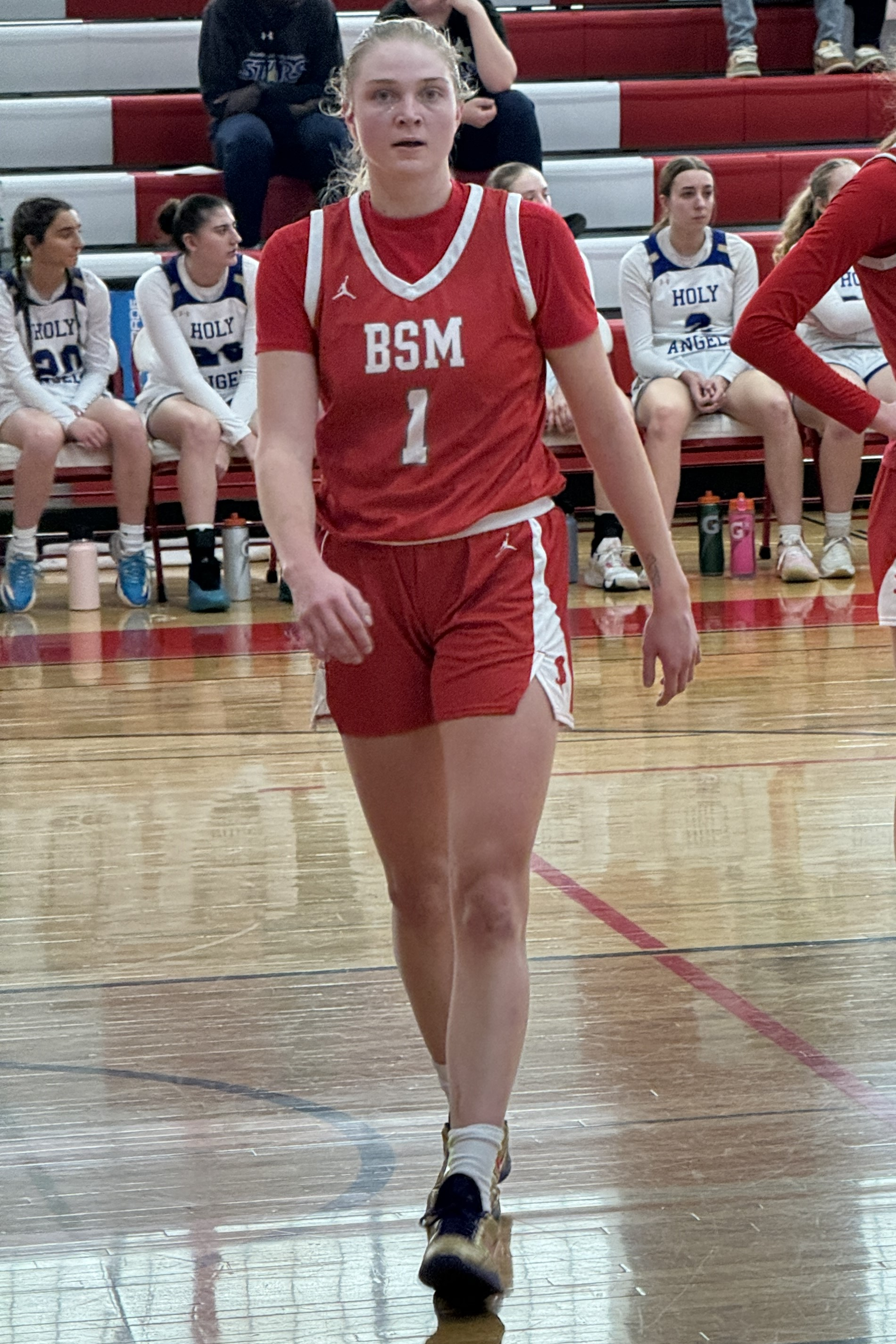
Olson with Benilde-St. Margaret's in 2024

Olson has trained with her father Chris from a young age, practicing her ball-handling and other skills. She began playing varsity basketball in eighth grade. As an eighth grader for Benilde-St. Margaret's, she tallied 40 points against a talented DeLaSalle High School team. She also played varsity soccer as an eighth grader, returning as a senior goalkeeper. By January 2021, as a freshman she had 17 athletic scholarship offers and was the No. 9 prospect in the national class of 2024. She averaged 23 points as a freshman. Late in her sophomore season, she was the No. 3 ranked prospect by ESPN in 2024 with over 40 college scholarship offers. She averaged 22.8 points as a sophomore.

On September 8, 2022, Olson gave a verbal commitment to Kim Barnes Arico and the Michigan Wolverines after the program reached its first two NCAA Division I women's basketball tournament Sweet Sixteen appearances in 2021 and 2022 and the 2021–22 Wolverines, posted the best season in school history. National class of 2023 top-30 prospect, Taylor Woodson, from Minnesota had also committed to Michigan by September 2022. Olson was the first top-40 player in the national class of 2024 to give a verbal commitment. Olson led her school to a 2023 MSHSL Class 3A State Championship averaging 25.6 points, 12.6 rebounds and 3.6 assists per game.

On November 8, 2023, she signed her national letter of intent (NLI) to play college basketball for the Michigan Wolverines. In November, she was the goalkeeper for the MSHSL Class 2A state champion soccer team. Then, on November 25, 2023, she broke a bone in her left hand in the season opener and did not return to action until January 4, 2024, when she posted her 2000th career point. Her father's Twitter explained that Olson's surgery required 2 plates and 12 screws. Ranked at No. 15 in the national class of 2024, she was the second highest-ranked recruit in program history at the time of her signing (Syla Swords, No. 11). The class of 2024 was the highest ranked class in school history (ranked No. 4 on signing day).

At the MSHSL Class 3A State Championship tournament, Benilde-St. Margaret's won its three games by margins of 35, 31 and 23 to defend its championship. In the championship game, Benilde-St. Margaret's (seeded first and ranked second) faced DeLaSalle High School (ranked first and seeded second). Olson had 30 points, 15 rebounds and six assists.

She was named to the April 2, 2024 McDonald's All-American Girls Game at the Toyota Center in Houston, Texas. Olson, along with incoming freshman Swords, are the program's first high school signees to earn the honor. Olson and Liv McGill were the eighth and ninth Minnesotans named McDonald's All-Americans. She has also been selected for the April 13 Nike Hoops Summit at the Moda Center in Portland, Oregon. During her senior year she averaged 24 points, 10 rebounds, 4.4 assists and 3.6 steals through 28 games and was named Minnesota Gatorade Player of the Year. She was also awarded Minnesota Miss Basketball. Although she was not a big scorer in the McDonald's All-American Game, MaxPreps writer Aaron Williams used the phrase "The highlight reel dish of the night" to describe her pass to her future Michigan teammate Swords. The play received lots of public praise, with ESPN's color commentator mentioning it as possibly "the prettiest play we've seen all game".

== College career ==
=== Freshman ===
Olson enrolled at the University of Michigan in 2024. She began her collegiate career in the starting lineup, wearing the No. 1 jersey in a 68–62 loss to the No. 1 ranked South Carolina Gamecocks on November 4, 2024. At the 2024 Fort Myers Tip-Off, Olson earned All-Tournament honors as 7–1 Michigan stretched its win streak to 7 games. Her performance in the tournament included her first NCAA career double-double with a 19-point/11-rebound effort in the first game against Belmont on November 29. On December 9, Olson earned her first Big Ten Freshman of the Week honor for her 18-point effort against Northwestern the day before. On January 29, 2025, Olson posted her a career-high 30 points along with 3 steals and 4 rebounds against Wisconsin. By following this up with an 18-point/10-rebound double-double on February 2 against Oregon, she earned a second Big Ten Freshman of the week honor. In the regular season of her freshman year, she averaged 16.0 points, 5.3 rebounds, 2.0 assists and 1.4 steals in 29.9 minutes per game. Following the season she was named Co-Big Ten Freshman of the Year by the coaches, along with Jaloni Cambridge.

=== Sophomore ===
On February 12, 2026, she posted a 21-point, eight-rebound, seven-assist, and two-steal effort in an 80–58 win over Northwestern. On February 25, she followed it with a 23-point, eight-rebound, four-assist, two-steal and two-block effort in a 86–65 rivalry game win against No. 13 Michigan State. Olson earned Big Ten Player of the Week honors. These games marked the 6th and 7th straight 20-point performances for Olson, who had scored in double figures in all 22 games up to that point, and it was the first Player of the week honor of her career. On February 25, Olson posted a career-high 31 points, including the game-winning basket with 3.2 seconds remaining in overtime, as well as nine rebounds and four assists in an 88–86 rivalry game against Ohio State, helping Michigan set a school record for conference wins, 14. On February 28, Olson closed out the regular season with 28 points, eight rebounds, four assists and three steals in a 87–69 Senior day victory against Maryland, resulting in her second Big Ten Player of the week award on March 2. During the regular season, Olson scored in double figures in all 29 games with sixteen 20-point games. She ranked fifth in the conference in scoring at 19.6 points per game, and was a unanimous first-team All-Big Ten selection.

Following the regular season, Olson was selected as a 2026 second-team All-American by ESPN and The Athletic. She was also a third-team All-American by the Associated Press, The Sporting News and U.S. Basketball Writers Association (USBWA).

=== Junior ===
Prior to the 2026–27 NCAA Division I women's basketball season, Olson was the only Big Ten women's basketball player who was a unanimous preseason All-Big Ten honoree by both the Big Ten coaches (unanimous along with JuJu Watkins) and the Big Ten media (unanimous along with Jaloni Cambridge) although Watkins won preseason player of the year by both the coaches and the media. The national media concurred with Watkins being named First team Pre-season All-American by both the Associated Press and The Athletic, while Olson was second team honoree by The Athletic and one of ten players receiving any votes by the Associated Press who only named a first team. With Olson as its leader and a solid core group the 2026–27 Michigan Wolverines women's basketball team, earned the school's first top 10 pre-season AP poll ranking at number 5.

In the November 5 season-opener against No. 2-ranked 2026–27 UConn Huskies women's basketball team, Olson contributed 19 points, eight rebounds, four assists and four steals in a 77–66 victory to snap the Huskies' 39 regular-season game streak. The game marked the school's first home game of top-5 opponents and the school's first victory against an opponent ranked above number 5.

== National team career ==
Olson represented the United States national team, winning a gold medal at the 2021 FIBA Under-16 Women's Americas Championship. She was one of only three 15-year-olds selected for the team.

== Personal life ==
Olson is enrolled in the School of Kinesiology, with Sport Management as her major. As a freshman in high school, she already had her own landscaping business with at least a dozen customers. Her father and brother, Morgan, kept her business running while she was training with and playing for Team USA in 2021. Morgan now plays soccer for the Gonzaga Bulldogs.

== Career statistics ==
Legend
| GP | Games played | GS | Games started | MPG | Minutes per game | RPG | Rebounds per game |
| APG | Assists per game | SPG | Steals per game | BPG | Blocks per game | PPG | Points per game |
| TO | Turnovers per game | FG% | Field-goal percentage | 3P% | 3-point field-goal percentage | FT% | Free-throw percentage |
| **Bold** | Career best | ° | League leader |

=== College ===
| Year | Team | GP | GS | MPG | FG% | 3P% | FT% | RPG | APG | SPG | BPG | TO | PPG |
|---|---|---|---|---|---|---|---|---|---|---|---|---|---|
| 2024–25 | Michigan | 34 | 34 | 30.8 | .466 | .383 | .824 | 5.3 | 2.1 | 1.4 | 0.5 | 2.5 | 16.3 |
| 2025–26 | Michigan | 35 | 35 | 31.1 | .468 | .305 | .810 | 6.1 | 2.5 | 1.8 | 0.5 | 2.0 | 18.9 |
| **Career** | | **69** | **69** | **31.0** | **.467** | **.338** | **.816** | **5.7** | **2.3** | **1.6** | **0.5** | **2.2** | **17.6** |
