= Kayleigh Heckel =

American basketball player (born 2006)

No. 9 – UConn Huskies
- Position: Guard
- League: Big East Conference

Personal information
- Born: July 8, 2006 (age 20) Greenwich, Connecticut, U.S.
- Listed height: 5 ft 9 in (1.75 m)

Career information
- High school: Port Chester (Port Chester, New York); Long Island Lutheran (Brookville, New York)
- College: USC (2024–2025); UConn (2025–present)

Career highlights
- Elite Scholar-Athlete Award (2026); McDonald's All-American Game (2024); Jordan Brand Classic (2024)
Medals
Women's basketball
Representing the United States
FIBA Under-19 World Cup
Gold medal – first place	2025 Czech Republic	Team
FIBA Under-18 AmeriCup
Gold medal – first place	2024 Colombia	Team

Kayleigh Amber Heckel (born July 8, 2006) is an American college basketball player for the UConn Huskies of the Big East Conference. She previously played for USC.

== Early life and high school career ==
Heckel was born to Donna and Walter Heckel in Greenwich, Connecticut, and has two brothers, Corey and Tyler. Her mother played softball at St. John's, while her father played baseball at St. John's and in the minor leagues for the Toronto Blue Jays.

She attended Port Chester High School in Port Chester, New York her first two years of high school. During her sophomore year she averaged 34.2 points and 11.1 rebounds per game. She then attended Long Island Lutheran High School during her junior and senior years. During her junior year she averaged 16.2 points, 6.5 assists and 3.7 steals per game. She finished her career with over 2,400 points and more than 500 assists, rebounds and steals.

She was a five-star recruit and ranked as the No. 13 overall recruit in the 2024 class. She was selected to compete at the 2024 McDonald's All-American Girls Game and Jordan Brand Classic.

== College career ==
On November 14, 2023, Heckel committed to play college basketball at USC. During the 2024–25 season, in her freshman year, she played in 34 games, with seven starts, and averaged 6.1 points, 1.9 assists and 1.3 steals in 16.9 minutes per game. On November 9, 2024, in a game against Cal Poly, she scored a career-high 16 points off the bench.

On May 20, 2025, Heckel transferred to UConn. She made her debut for UConn during the season opener on November 4, 2025, in a game against Louisville during the Armed Forces Classic. She scored 14 points, two rebounds, two assists and one steal in her first 23 minutes for UConn, coming off the bench. During the 2025–26 season, in her sophomore year, she averaged 6.9 points and 2.8 rebounds per game off the bench. She had a 3.967 grade point average (GPA) and won the 2026 Elite Scholar-Athlete Award. The award recognizes the student-athlete with the highest cumulative GPA competing at the finals for each of the NCAA's men's and women's championships.

== National team career ==
On May 18, 2024, Heckel was named to the United States under-18 national team for the 2024 FIBA Under-18 Women's AmeriCup. During the tournament she averaged 12.8 points, 3.8 rebounds and 3.7 assists per game in six games and won a gold medal.

On June 20, 2025, she was named to the United States under-19 national team for the 2025 FIBA Under-19 Women's Basketball World Cup. During the tournament she averaged nine points, 3.1 rebounds, and 3.6 assists per game in seven games. She also averaged 2.6 steals per game, which ranked fourth in the tournament. During the final against Australia, she scored 16 points, five rebounds and five assists to help team USA win a gold medal.

== Career statistics ==
Legend
GP	Games played	GS	Games started	MPG	Minutes per game	RPG	Rebounds per game
APG	Assists per game	SPG	Steals per game	BPG	Blocks per game	PPG	Points per game
TO	Turnovers per game	FG%	Field-goal percentage	3P%	3-point field-goal percentage	FT%	Free-throw percentage
**Bold**	Career best	°	League leader

=== College ===
Year	Team	GP	GS	MPG	FG%	3P%	FT%	RPG	APG	SPG	BPG	TO	PPG
2024-25	USC	34	7	16.9	45.9	28.3	78.3	1.4	1.8	1.3	0.1	1.4	6.1
**Career**		34	7	16.9	45.9	28.3	78.3	1.4	1.8	1.3	0.1	1.4	6.1
Statistics retrieved from Sports-Reference.
