= Kate Koval =

Ukrainian basketball player (born 2006)

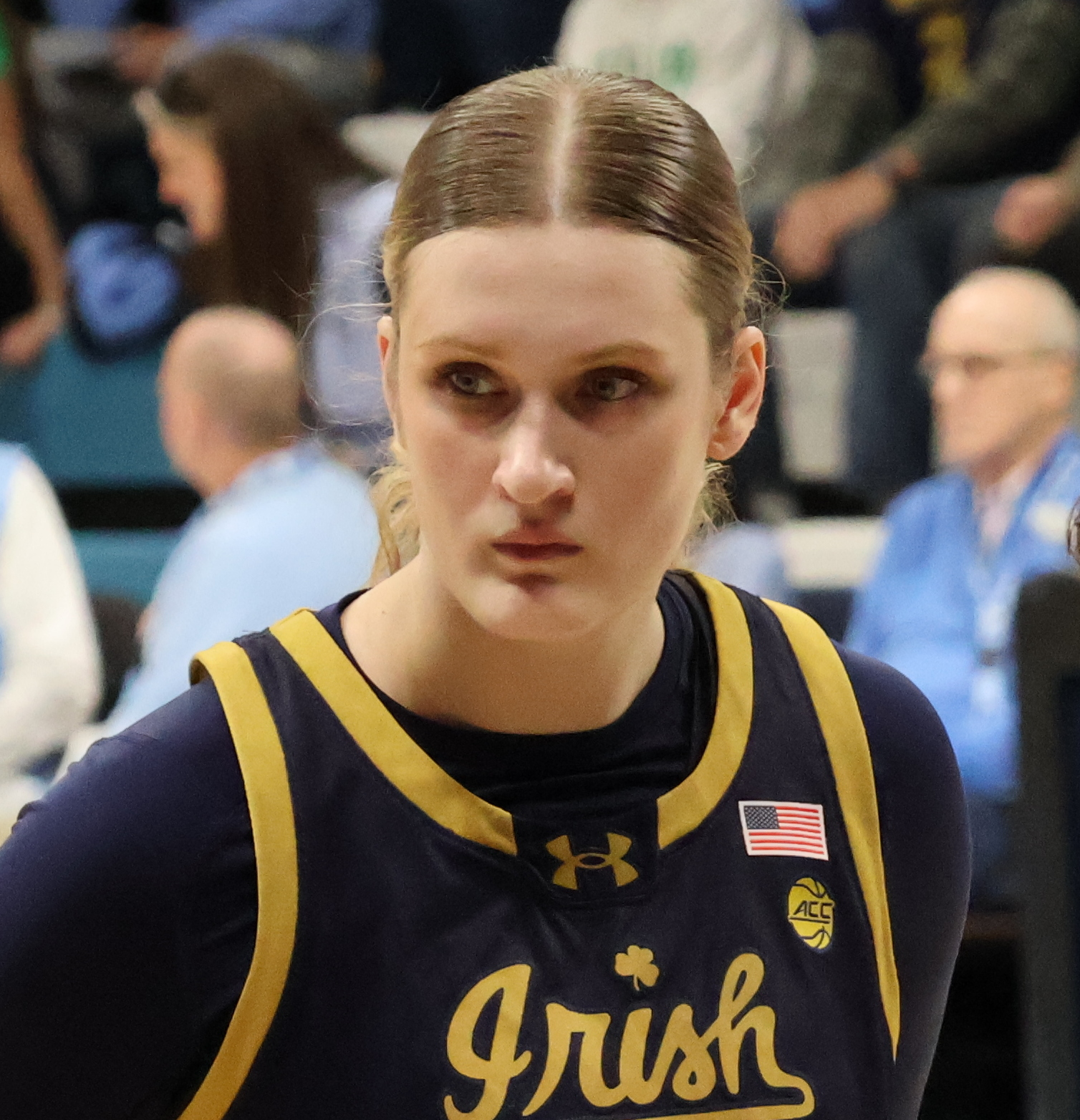
- Koval with Notre Dame in 2025

No. 13 – Baylor Bears
- Position: Forward
- League: Big 12 Conference

Personal information
- Born: 13 January 2006 (age 20) Kyiv, Ukraine
- Listed height: 6 ft 5 in (1.96 m)

Career information
- High school: Long Island Lutheran (Brookville, New York)
- College: Notre Dame (2024–2025); LSU (2025–2026); Baylor (2026–present)

Career highlights
- ACC All-Freshman Team (2025); McDonald's All-American Game (2024); Nike Hoop Summit (2024); Jordan Brand Classic (2024); Miss New York Basketball (2024)

Kateryna "Kate" Koval (born 13 January 2006) is a Ukrainian college basketball player for the Baylor Bears of the Big 12 Conference. She previously played for Notre Dame and LSU.

== Early life and high school career ==
Koval was born to Oleksandr and Natalia Koval in Kyiv, Ukraine. Growing up she performed ballet and played basketball. She moved to the United States in 2021 to attend Long Island Lutheran High School and play basketball. She lived in Queens, New York with her host mom, Islande Blaise.

Koval attended Long Island Lutheran High School. During her junior year she averaged 15.1 points, 11.7 rebounds and 3.4 blocks per game. Following the season she was named New York Gatorade Player of the Year. She was a five-star recruit and ranked as the No. 5 overall recruit, and the No. 1 post player, in the 2024 class according to ESPN HoopGurlz recruiting rankings. She was selected to compete at the (2024 McDonald's All-American Girls Game, Nike Hoop Summit and Jordan Brand Classic.

== College career ==
=== Notre Dame ===
On 14 November 2023, Koval committed to play college basketball at Notre Dame. During the 2024–25 season, in her freshman year, she played in 32 games, with ten starts, and averaged 5.3 points, 4.7 rebounds and 1.7 blocks per game. Her 55 blocks ranks fourth in program history by a freshman. She made her collegiate debut on 4 November 4 2024, in a game against Mercyhurst, and scored 18 points, seven rebounds, three assists and five blocks. She was the first Irish player since Devereaux Peters in 2007 to record five blocks in a season opener. On 13 November 2024, in a game against James Madison, she scored 14 points, 16 rebounds, and six blocks, for her first career double-double. On 17 November 2024, in a game against Lafayette, she scored 11 points, a career-high 19 rebounds and seven blocks, for her second consecutive double-double. Her seven blocks were the most by a Notre Dame player since Brianna Turner in 2017. She averaged 12.5 points, 17.5 rebounds and 6.5 blocks per game and was named the ACC Rookie of the Week for the week ending 18 November 2024. Following the season she was named to the ACC All-Freshman Team.

=== LSU ===
On 7 April 2025, Koval transferred to LSU. During the 2025–26 season, in her sophomore year, she appeared in 35 games, with 17 starts, and averaged 8.3 points and 6.3 rebounds per game. On 24 August 2026, LSU announced that Koval was leaving the program due to personal reasons. The announcement came two weeks after LSU signed Russian player Anna Minaeva.

=== Baylor ===
On 12 September 2026, Koval transferred to Baylor. She was allowed to enter the transfer portal outside of the normal window after she was granted a legislative relief waiver by the NCAA.

== National team career ==
Koval represented Ukraine at the 2021 FIBA U16 European Challengers and averaged a double-double of 26 points and 14.2 rebounds per game in five games.

== Career statistics ==
Legend
GP	Games played	GS	Games started	MPG	Minutes per game	RPG	Rebounds per game
APG	Assists per game	SPG	Steals per game	BPG	Blocks per game	PPG	Points per game
TO	Turnovers per game	FG%	Field-goal percentage	3P%	3-point field-goal percentage	FT%	Free-throw percentage
**Bold**	Career best	°	League leader

=== College ===
Year	Team	GP	GS	MPG	FG%	3P%	FT%	RPG	APG	SPG	BPG	TO	PPG
2024–25	Notre Dame	32	10	18.3	45.1	0.0	69.7	4.7	1.3	0.4	1.7	2.1	5.3
2025–26	LSU	35	17	16.6	56.0	0.0	75.2	6.3	0.4	1.1	1.2	1.3	8.3
**Career**		32	10	18.3	45.1	0.0	69.7	4.7	1.3	0.4	1.7	2.1	5.3
Statistics retrieved from Sports-Reference.
