= Arianna Roberson =

American basketball player (born 2006)

No. 21 – Duke Blue Devils
- Position: Center
- League: Atlantic Coast Conference

Personal information
- Born: January 2, 2006 (age 20) San Antonio, Texas, U.S.
- Listed height: 6 ft 4 in (1.93 m)

Career information
- High school: Clark High School (San Antonio, Texas)
- College: Duke (2024–present)

Career highlights
- All-ACC Freshman Team (2026); McDonald's All-American (2024); Texas Miss Basketball (2024)

Arianna Jalisa Roberson (born January 2, 2006) is an American basketball player who currently plays as a center for Duke University.

== High school career ==
She played high school basketball for Clark High School in San Antonio, Texas, and was a 2024 McDonald's All American. She led the school to its first ever state title in 2023.

== College career ==
After graduating from high school, Roberson joined Duke University. She missed the 2024–2025 season due to a knee injury.

Roberson appeared in 33 games during the 2025–26 season where she averaged 8.0 points and 5.7 rebounds. On February 8, 2026, she had career highs of 22 points and 16 rebounds off the bench in a win against SMU.

== National team career ==
In 2024, Roberson won gold with the United States U18 national team at the FIBA U18 Women's AmeriCup championship in Bucaramanga, Colombia, and at the FIBA 3x3 U18 World Cup in Hungary.

== Personal life ==
She is the sister of basketball player Aaliyah Roberson. Her older brother is former NBA player André Roberson. She is currently dating Dallas Mavericks forward Cooper Flagg.
