= Avery Howell =

Canadian basketball player (born 2006)

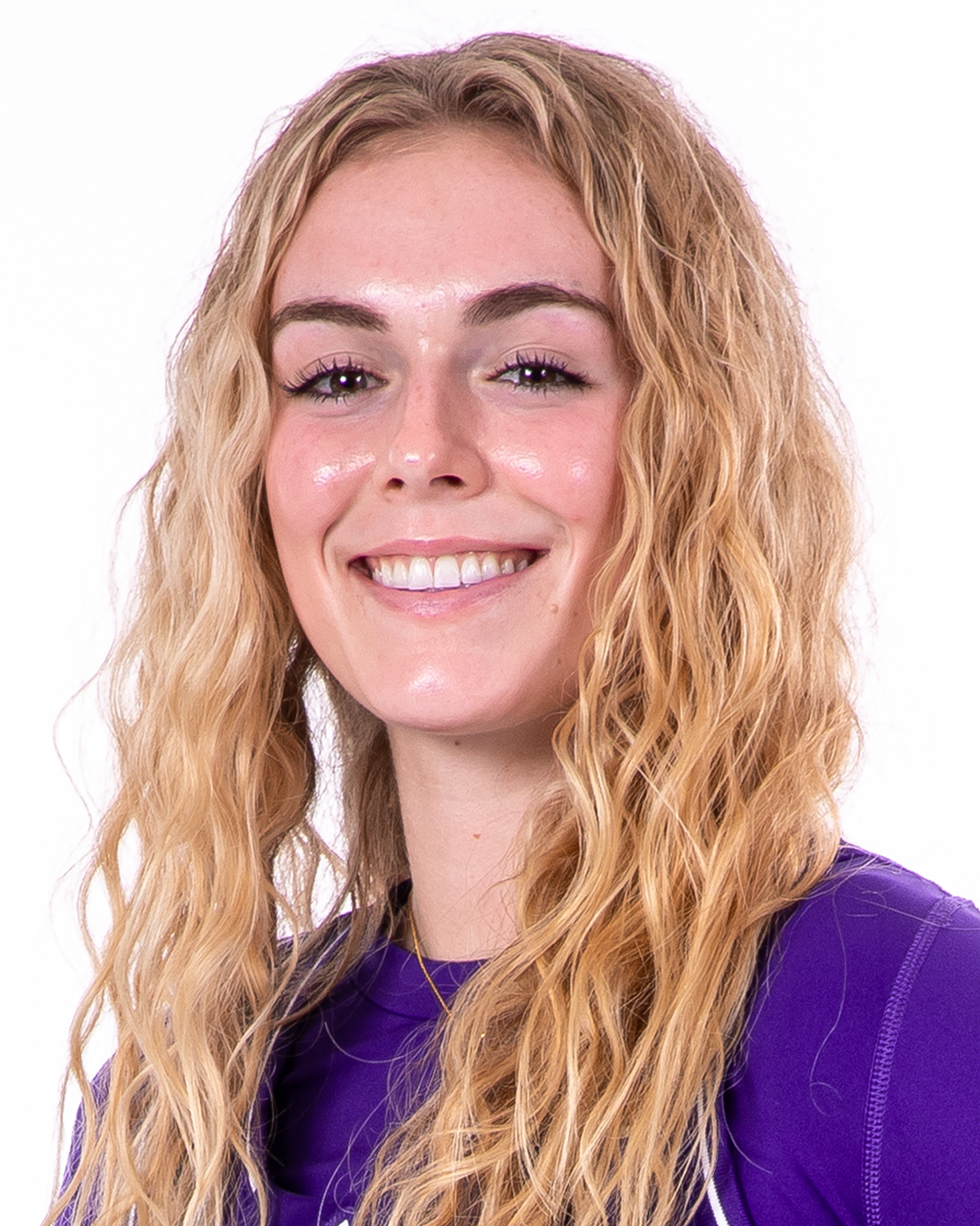

No. 2 – Washington Huskies
- Position: Guard
- League: Big Ten Conference

Personal information
- Born: June 8, 2006 (age 20) Boise, Idaho, U.S.
- Listed height: 6 ft 0 in (1.83 m)

Career information
- High school: Boise High School (Boise, Idaho)
- College: USC (2024–2025); Washington (2025–present)

Career highlights
- McDonald's All-American (2024)

Avery Rose Howell (born June 8, 2006) is an American-Canadian college basketball player for the Washington Huskies of the Big Ten Conference. She previously played for the USC Trojans.

== High school career ==
Howell played basketball for Boise High School. During her junior year she averaged 22.1 points, 13.2 rebounds, 2.3 assists and 2.8 steals per game. She recorded 20 double-doubles and set the single-season program record for points (551) and rebounds (345). She was subsequently named the Idaho Gatorade Player of the Year.

During her senior year, she averaged 21.2 points, 10.6 rebounds, 2.3 assists and 2.9 steals per game and was named the Idaho Gatorade Player of the Year for the second consecutive year. She finished her high school career with 1,432 points, 970 rebounds, 214 steals, and 180 assists.

She was considered a five-star recruit and selected to compete in the 2024 McDonald's All-American Girls Game. She became only the second Idahoan girl in history to be named a McDonald's All-American.

== College career ==
On October 11, 2023, Howell committed to play college basketball at USC. During the 2024–25 season, in her freshman season, she appeared in 35 games with three starts, and averaged 7.5 points and 3.0 rebounds per game. On January 22, 2025, against Purdue she scored a then career-high 18 points, four three-pointers and three steals. She was subsequently named the Big Ten Freshman of the Week for the week ending January 27, 2025. During the second round of the 2025 NCAA Division I women's basketball tournament against Mississippi State she scored a career-high-tying 18 points, to help USC advance to the Sweet Sixteen.

On April 8, 2025, Howell transferred to Washington. On December 29, 2025, against Northwestern she scored a then career-high 23 points. In the next game on January 1, 2026, she scored 22 points and a career-high 16 rebounds, in an upset victory over No. 6 Michigan. She was subsequently named the USBWA Player Of The Week for the week ending January 6, 2026. During the first round of the 2026 NCAA Division I women's basketball tournament against South Dakota State she scored a career-high 30 points on seven three-pointers. Her seven three-pointers tied a career high and are tied for the third most in a single game in NCAA Tournament history. She became the first Husky since Kelsey Plum to score 30 points or more in an NCAA tournament game.

== National team career ==
Howell made her national team debut for Canada at the 2025 FIBA Under-19 Women's Basketball World Cup. During the tournament she averaged 14.1 points, 3.4 rebounds and 1.7 assists per game and finished in fourth place. She was the team's second leading scorer, behind Syla Swords. She was subsequently named to the FIBA U19 World Cup All-Second Team.

== Personal life ==
Howell was born to Rosie and Brian Howell, and has one brother, Cooper. Her mother, played college basketball at Lewis-Clark State College. She has dual Canadian and United States citizenship.
