= Tom C. Clark High School =

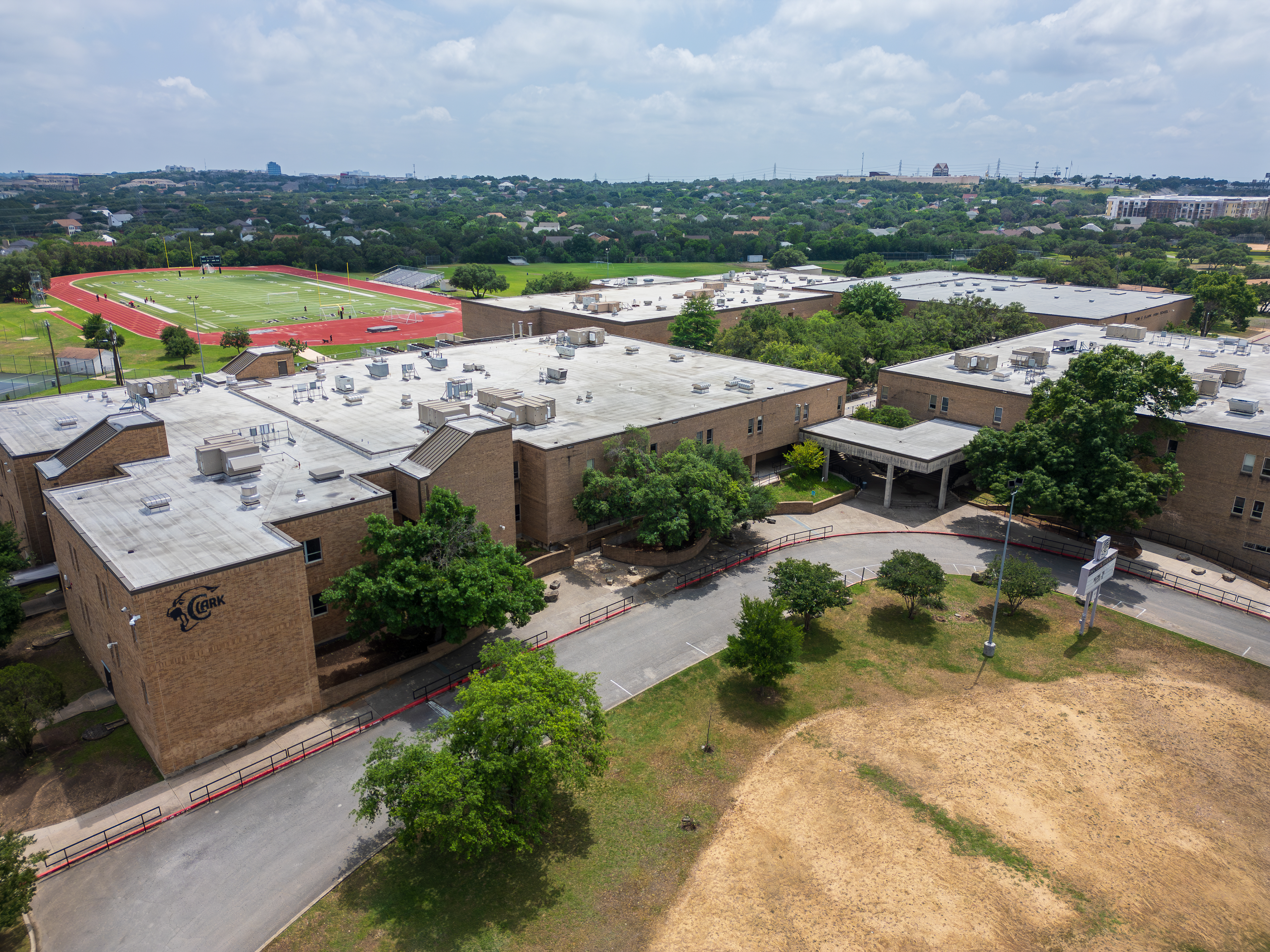

Location
- 5150 DeZavala Road; San Antonio, Bexar County, Texas 78249; United States; 29.565811°N 98.580819°W

Information
- School type: Public, high school
- Established: 1978
- Locale: City: Large
- School district: Northside ISD
- Superintendent: Brian T. Woods
- NCES School ID: 483312003722
- Principal: Steve Zimmerman
- Teaching staff: 161.76 (on an FTE basis)
- Grades: 9 –12
- Enrollment: 2,746 (2023–2024)
- Student to teacher ratio: 16.98
- Colors: Black, White and Silver
- Athletics conference: UIL AAAAAA
- Mascot: Cougar
- Communities served: A portion of San Antonio and all of Shavano Park
- Rival schools: Winston Churchill High School
- Sports District: 28–6A
- Feeder Middle Schools: Hobby; Rawlinson
- Website: Official Website

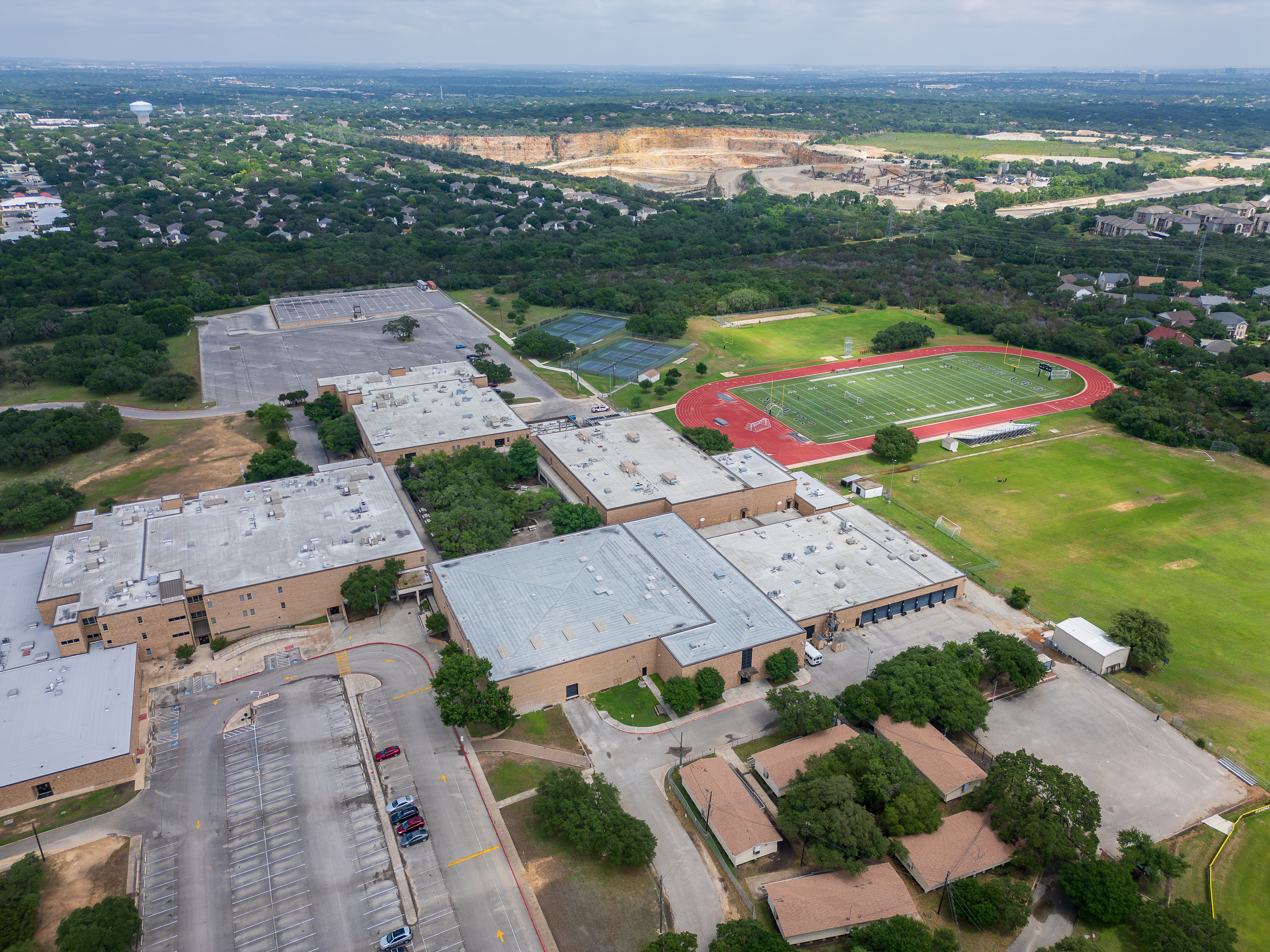
Tom C. Clark High School from above

Tom C. Clark High School is a public high school, in the Northside Independent School District in San Antonio, Texas and serves a portion of Scenic Oaks. During 2022–2023, Clark High School had an enrollment of 2,835 students and a student to teacher ratio of 17.29. For the 2024-2025 school year, the school was given a "C" by the Texas Education Agency, with distinctions for Academic Achievement in ELA/Reading.

== Campus History ==
Built in 1978 with five main buildings surrounding a courtyard, this school has over 120 classrooms and is one of the largest schools in Northside ISD. As with all Northside ISD high schools, Clark is named for a former or current United States Supreme Court Justice, in this case Tom C. Clark.

== Programs ==
Clark is home to an award-winning fine arts department, which offers programs in Concert and Marching Band, Orchestra, Choir, Theatre, and Art.

Clark also offers athletic programs sanctioned by the University Interscholastic League. These include Football, Boys and Girls Basketball, Boys and Girls Soccer, Baseball, Volleyball, Track and Field, Swimming and Diving, Softball, Tennis, Golf, and Cross Country. Waterpolo was discontinued in 2012.

Clark also offers most, if not all, of the Academic UIL events, including Academic Decathlon, Social Studies, Science, Current Issues, One Act Play, Computer Science, Computer Applications, Calculator Applications, Literary Criticism, CX Debate, Lincoln-Douglas Debates, various speaking competitive events, various journalistic competitive events, and Air Force Junior ROTC. Advanced Placement courses: Human Geography, English Literature, English Composition, World History, U.S. History, European History, Environmental Science, U.S. Government, Microeconomics, Psychology, Biology, Chemistry, Physics 1, Physics 2, Physics C, Calculus AB, Calculus BC, Statistics, Computer Science, Art History, Studio Art, Spanish, French, German.

== Academic awards ==
In 2013, Newsweek Magazine named Tom C. Clark High School one of their top 2,000 schools in the country; schools that have proven to be the most effective in turning out college-ready grads. In 2017, Clark was ranked 7th out of 75 Greater San Antonio high schools in Children at Risk's School Rankings.

== Athletics ==
The Clark Cougars compete in these sports:

- Baseball
- Basketball
- Cross Country
- Football
- Golf
- Soccer
- Softball
- Swimming and Diving
- Tennis
- Track and Field
- Volleyball
- Water Polo
- Marching Band

=== Athletic highlights ===
Football: In the 2008–2009 football season, the Clark Cougars played in the 5A Texas Semi-Finals against F.B. Hightower, the farthest the school has ever advanced in the playoffs.

Tennis: District Champions of Northside Independent School District for 31 straight years.

Track and Field: 2012 – Men's district Champions in the 27-5A meet by one point over Brandeis High School.

Swimming: 2016 – Both men's and women's swim team crowned district champions

Girls Basketball—Class 6A 2022 State Semi-Finalist, 2023 Class 6A State Champions

Girls Volleyball - The Cougars have had multiple UIL State appearances, District Championships and ultimately they have earned two State Championship titles. The first championship came in 1990 and the second in 2003.

== Notable alumni ==
- Matt Beech (Class of 1990) — Former MLB baseball pitcher for the Philadelphia Phillies
- Jason Brickman (Class of 2010) — Professional basketball player. NCAA fourth all-time in assists.
- Jessica Collins (Class of 2001) — Actress
- Wane McGarity (Class of 1995) — Former professional football player for the Dallas Cowboys and New Orleans Saints in the NFL, and the Calgary Stampeders and Winnipeg Blue Bombers (2005) of the CFL.
- Trent Plaisted (Class of 2005) — Professional basketball player, drafted 46th overall in the 2008 NBA Draft.
- Ben Sims (Class of 2018) — NFL tight end
- Arianna Roberson — Basketball player.
