= Kennedy Smith =

American basketball player (born 2006)

No. 11 – USC Trojans
- Position: Guard
- League: Big Ten Conference

Personal information
- Born: January 21, 2006 (age 20) Fullerton, California, U.S.
- Listed height: 6 ft 1 in (1.85 m)

Career information
- High school: Etiwanda (Rancho Cucamonga, California)
- College: USC (2024–present)

Career highlights
- Big Ten All-Defensive Team (2026); Big Ten All-Freshman Team (2025); McDonald's All-American (2024); Nike Hoop Summit (2024); Jordan Brand Classic MVP (2024)
Medals
Women's basketball
Representing the United States
FIBA AmeriCup
Gold medal – first place	2025 Chile
FIBA Under-18 AmeriCup
Gold medal – first place	2024 Colombia	Team

Kennedy Smith (born January 21, 2006) is an American college basketball player for the USC Trojans of the Big Ten Conference.

== High school career ==
Smith attended Etiwanda High School in Rancho Cucamonga, California, where she was a three-time All-CIF selection. She helped Etiwanda win the 2023 Open Division State Championship and the 2022 Southern Section title, along with being a Naismith Award semifinalist and McDonald's All-American in 2024. Smith averaged 20.2 points, 7.5 rebounds, 2.1 assists, 2.1 steals and 1.8 blocks as a senior, winning the 2024 Open Division State Championship game and was named the 2023-24 Gatorade California Girls Basketball Player of the Year. As the nation's No. 6 recruit in the class of 2024, she committed to play college basketball at USC.

== College career ==
During the 2024–25 season, in her freshman year, she appeared and started in 28 games, and averaged 9.5 points, 4.3 rebounds and 2.0 assists per game, earning Big Ten All-Freshman honors and All-Big Ten Honorable Mention. She led the team in steals with 2.2 per game even after missing seven games due to injury. Smith was also named to the regional all-tournament team, setting a career high in points with 19 against Kansas State.

== National team career ==
On May 18, 2024, Smith was named to the United States under-18 national team for the 2024 FIBA Under-18 Women's AmeriCup. During the tournament she averaged 9.5 points, 3.5 rebounds and 2.5 assists in six games. She helped the United States win a gold medal and had 18 points, three rebounds, and three assists in the final against Canada.

On June 20, 2025, she was named to team USA's roster for the 2025 FIBA Women's AmeriCup. During the tournament she averaged 4.1 points, 1.6 rebounds, 2.0 steals and 0.9 blocks per game and won a gold medal.

== Career statistics ==
Legend
GP	Games played	GS	Games started	MPG	Minutes per game	RPG	Rebounds per game
APG	Assists per game	SPG	Steals per game	BPG	Blocks per game	PPG	Points per game
TO	Turnovers per game	FG%	Field-goal percentage	3P%	3-point field-goal percentage	FT%	Free-throw percentage
**Bold**	Career best	°	League leader

=== College ===
Year	Team	GP	GS	MPG	FG%	3P%	FT%	RPG	APG	SPG	BPG	TO	PPG
2024–25	USC	28	28	29.1	41.2	30.3	68.5	4.3	2.0	2.2	0.7	1.9	9.5
Career		28	28	29.1	41.2	30.3	68.5	4.3	2.0	2.2	0.7	1.9	9.5
