= Liv McGill =

American basketball player (born 2006)

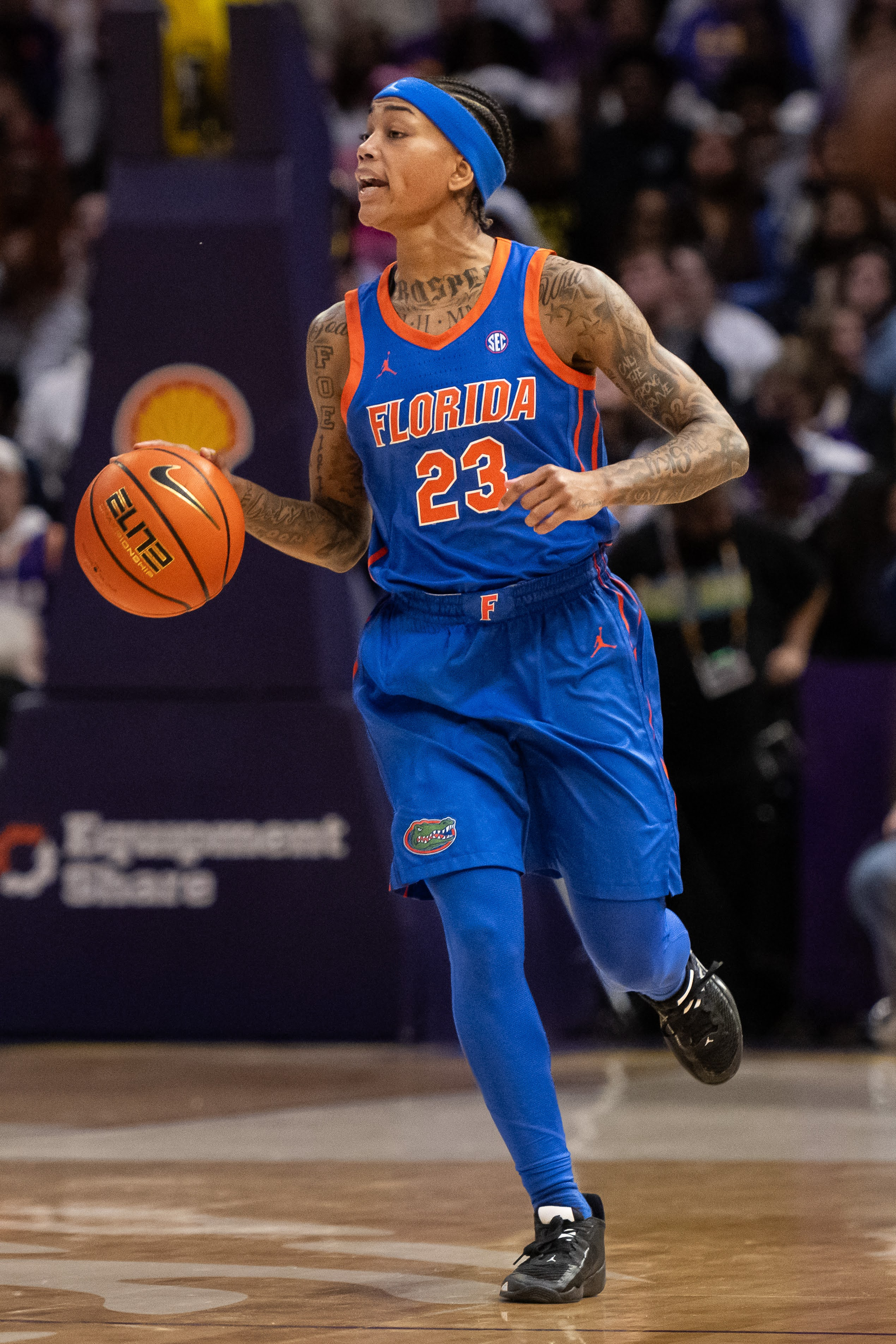
- McGill with Florida in 2026

No. 23 – Oklahoma State Cowgirls
- Position: Guard
- League: Big 12 Conference

Personal information
- Born: March 2, 2006 (age 20)
- Listed height: 5 ft 9 in (1.75 m)

Career information
- High school: Hopkins (Minneapolis, Minnesota)
- College: Florida (2024–2026); Oklahoma State (2026–present)

Career highlights
- First-team All-SEC (2026); SEC All-Freshman Team (2025); McDonald's All-American (2024)
Medals
Women's basketball
Representing the United States
FIBA Under-18 AmeriCup
Gold medal – first place	2024 Colombia	Team

Alivia "Liv" McGill (born March 2, 2006) is an American college basketball player for the Oklahoma State Cowgirls of the Big 12.

== Early life and high school career ==
McGill attended Hopkins High School in Minneapolis, Minnesota. She was a five-star recruit and a two-time Adidas All-American player. During her senior year she averaged 22.4 points and 5.1 assists per game, and was named the Metro Player of the Year by the Minnesota Star Tribune. She was named to the 2024 McDonald's All-American Girls Game.

On March 27, 2023, McGill committed to play college basketball at Florida. On November 8, 2023, she signed her National Letter of Intent (NLI) to play for Florida. She was ranked the seventh best recruit by ProspectsNation, and the highest-ranked recruit in Florida program history.

== College career ==
=== Freshman season ===
On November 4, 2024, McGill made her collegiate debut for Florida and recorded 14 points, five rebounds and six assists in a game against Florida Atlantic. On January 12, 2025, in a game against Missouri, she recorded 21 points, 11 rebounds, and ten assists for her first career triple-double. This was Florida's first triple-double since Delicia Washington on November 23, 2017. She was subsequently named the SEC Freshman of the Week for the week ending January 14, 2025. On March 6, 2025, during the second round of the SEC tournament against Alabama, she scored a career-high 29 points, to help Florida advance to the quarterfinals.

In 30 games during the regular season, she led all freshmen in the country in assists (151) and assists per game (5.0). She also ranked in the top-five for scoring among all freshmen, with a combined 486 points. During her freshmen year, she led the team in points (486), points per game (16.2), made field goals (183), assists (151), steals (57), and minutes played (30:32). Following the season she was named to the SEC All-Freshmen Team. She scored in double figures in 33 of her 37 games, including fourteen 20+ point games. She finished her freshman year with 611 points, setting a Florida freshman single-season record.

=== Sophomore season ===
On November 3, 2025, during the first game of the season against North Florida, McGill scored 26 points, nine rebounds and nine assists, nearly posting her second career triple-double. On November 6, 2025, during a game against Chattanooga, she scored a career-high 38 points, ten assists, eight rebounds and seven steals. Her 38 points were the most scored in program history in a Gators' home game. Over the first two games of the 2025–26 season, she recorded 64 points, 17 rebounds, 19 assists and 12 steals. Per OptaStats, the only other NBA, WNBA or Division I men's or women's player this century to have 60/15/15/10 in those categories over a two-game span was Dwyane Wade from February 28 to March 2, 2009. She became the third player since the 1999–2000 season in SEC history to record multiple games of at least 25 points, five rebounds, five assists and five steals. She was subsequently named the SEC Player of the Week and USBWA National Player of the Week, for the week ending November 11, 2025.

On November 28, 2025, during the first game of the Cayman Islands Classic against Memphis she recorded 27 points, six rebounds, two assists and two steals. The next day against Georgia Tech she recorded 27 points, three rebounds, six assists, two steals and two blocks. She averaged 27.0 points, 4.5 rebounds, 4,0 assists, 2.0 steals and 1.0 blocked shots in two games, and was named tournament Most Outstanding Player.

She averaged 22.3 points, 6.0 rebounds, 6.1 assists and 2.59 steals per game. She was one of three players in the nation averaging at least 20 points, six rebounds and six assists, joining Hannah Hidalgo and Olivia Miles. Following the season she was named to the first-team All-SEC.

=== Junior season ===
On April 14, 2026, McGill announced she would transfer to Oklahoma State for her junior season.

== National team career ==
On May 20, 2024, McGill was selected to represent the United States at the 2024 FIBA U18 Women's AmeriCup. During the tournament she averaged 3.5 points, 1.8 rebounds and 3.3 assists in 16 minutes per game and won a gold medal.

On June 20, 2025, she was selected to represent the United States at the 2025 FIBA Under-19 Women's Basketball World Cup. However, she was unable to compete in the tournament and was replaced by Maddyn Greenway on the roster.

== Career statistics ==
Legend
GP	Games played	GS	Games started	MPG	Minutes per game	RPG	Rebounds per game
APG	Assists per game	SPG	Steals per game	BPG	Blocks per game	PPG	Points per game
TO	Turnovers per game	FG%	Field-goal percentage	3P%	3-point field-goal percentage	FT%	Free-throw percentage
**Bold**	Career best	°	League leader

=== College ===
Year	Team	GP	GS	MPG	FG%	3P%	FT%	RPG	APG	SPG	BPG	TO	PPG
2024–25	Florida	37	37	31.2	42.9	30.2	73.4	4.6	5.2	2.1	0.3	4.6	16.5
**Career**		37	37	31.2	42.9	30.2	73.4	4.6	5.2	2.1	0.3	4.6	16.5
