= Benilde-St. Margaret's =

Private school in St. Louis Park, Minnesota, US

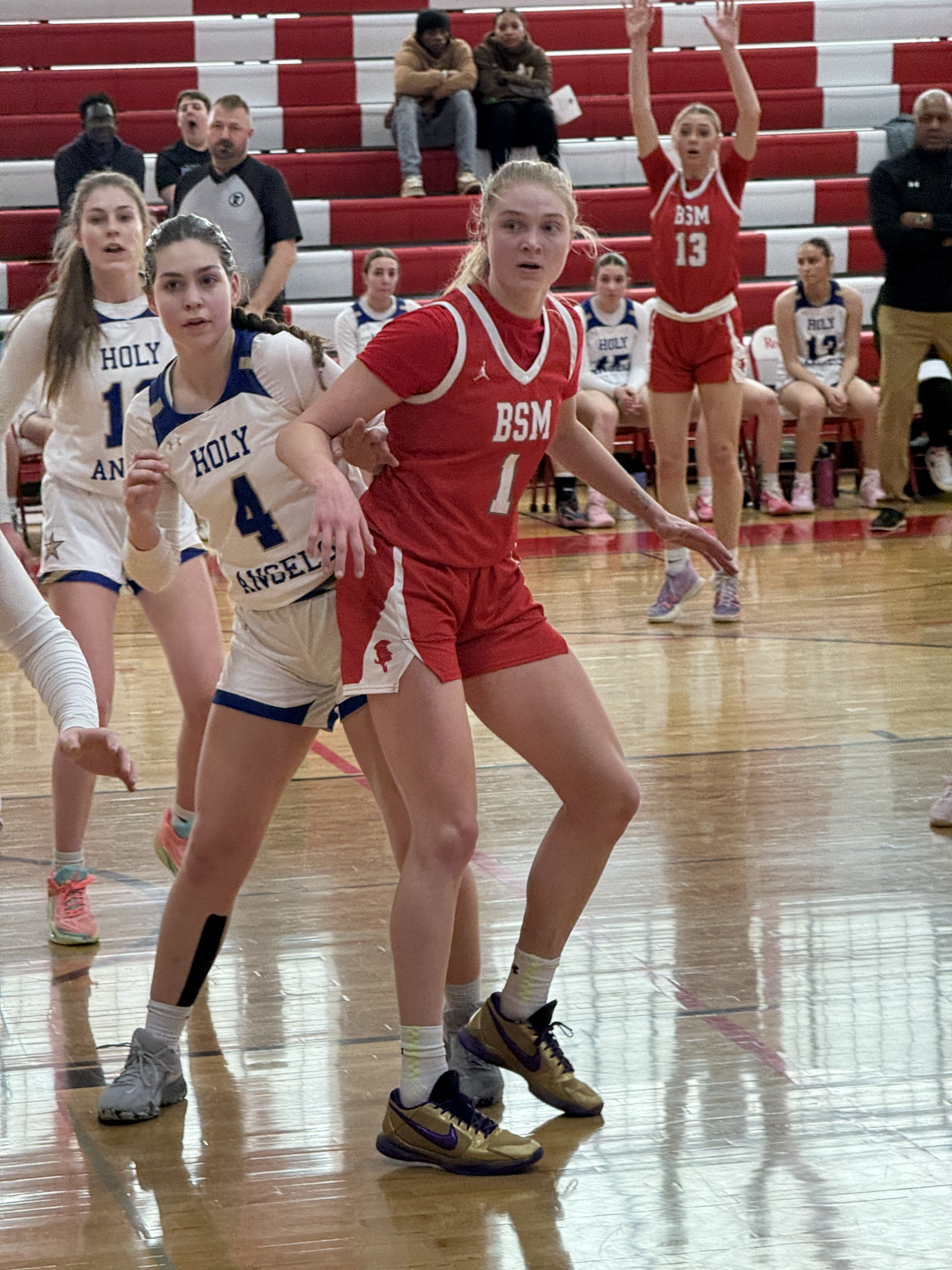
- Olivia Olson in 2024

Location
- 2501 Highway 100; St. Louis Park, Hennepin County, Minnesota 55416; United States; 44°57′30″N 93°20′43″W

Information
- Type: Private, Day, College-prep
- Motto: Pietas ∙ Veritas ∙ Scientia (Duty ∙ Truth ∙ Knowledge)
- Religious affiliation: Christian
- Denomination: Catholic
- Patron saints: Saint Bénilde Romançon; Saint Margaret of Scotland
- Established: 1907 (St. Margaret’s Academy); 1956 (Benilde High School); 1974 (Benilde-St. Margaret's - current)
- President: Danielle Hermanny
- Principal: Rikki Mortl (Middle School), Dan Wrobleski (High School)
- Grades: 6–12
- Gender: Coeducational
- Average class size: 21
- Student to teacher ratio: 11:1
- Colors: Red and White
- Athletics: 27 varsity sports
- Athletics conference: Metro West Conference
- Mascot: Victor E. Knight
- Nickname: Red Knights
- Accreditation: North Central Association of Colleges and Schools
- Newspaper: Knight Errant http://bsmknighterrant.org
- Yearbook: Sangraal
- Website: www.bsmschool.org

Benilde-St. Margaret's is a Catholic, co-educational private college-preparatory school for grades 6–12 located in St. Louis Park, Minnesota, that draws its over one thousand students from throughout the Twin Cities Metro Area. It is located in the Archdiocese of Saint Paul and Minneapolis.

== History ==
It is named after Saint Bénilde Romançon and Saint Margaret of Scotland. Benilde-St. Margaret's was originally a secondary school formed by a merger in 1974 between St. Margaret's Academy, a Catholic secondary school for girls in Minneapolis, and Benilde High School, a Catholic secondary school for boys in St. Louis Park. Its present building was originally that of Benilde High School.

=== St. Margaret's Academy ===
St. Margaret's was founded by the Sisters of St. Joseph of Carondelet in 1907 as St. Margaret's Academy. The campus for this all-girls school was located near the Basilica of St. Mary in downtown Minneapolis and included two mansions and a carriage house that had been built in the 1880s. By 1959 the old school had become inadequate in size – for every 100 girls accepted, about 200 were turned away. The Sisters of St. Joseph, who had anticipated such a problem, had purchased twenty-eight acres, and by 1960 a new school was built on Upton Avenue, near the Eloise Butler Wildflower Gardens and Wirth Park.

=== Benilde High School ===
The Brothers of the Christian Schools (informally known as the Christian Brothers), under the direction of Brother Mark Sullivan, built a boys' school in the Minneapolis suburb of St. Louis Park in 1956 because De La Salle (the first all-boys Catholic high school in the west metro) was full.

=== Merger ===
Both schools operated independently until the 1970s, at which time enrollment began to decline and costs began to escalate. In 1974, the St. Margaret's facility was sold to the Minneapolis school system, and the merged Benilde-St. Margaret's School opened its door at the former Benilde High School site. One hundred ninety students graduated in its first class.

The school has undergone two major additions since the merger; a new gym in 1986, along with a new chapel, theatre, arts center, and classroom wing in 2001.

The mascot is a Knight, named Victor E Knight who attends school events and leads students in singing the school rouser and cheering on student athletes.

== Academics ==
In 1989, a junior high was added, and one hundred seventh- and eighth-graders were enrolled in the first year. Students receive laptops to do their work over the school year. As a "school within a school," the junior high exists to help seventh and eighth-grade students develop their potential and make a successful transition from elementary to high school. The junior faculty and staff foster decision-making and responsibility in a nurturing atmosphere and they provide a variety of spiritual, academic, and extracurricular opportunities for student involvement. The Junior High is in the same building as the high school. Beginning in the 2025–2026 school year, BSM added sixth grade into their junior high.

== Activities ==
The school competes in the Metro West Conference in the Minnesota State High School League. The school's newspaper is the Knight Errant. The Knight Errant has won several awards and the website, bsmknighterrant.org, in 2009 received one of seven National Pace Maker Awards for progressive journalism. Speech is also quite popular, with 100 students participating in the season of 2009–2010.

Team State Championships
Season	Sport	Number of Championships	Year
Fall	Soccer, Boys	5	1997, 2000, 2003, 2006, 2011
Fall	Soccer, Girls	5	2012, 2013, 2015, 2016, 2023
Fall	Cross country, Boys	4	1962, 1963, 1964, 1965 (Catholic State HS Champs)
Fall	Football, Boys	1	2016
Winter	Alpine skiing, Boys	1	2004
Winter	Alpine skiing, Girls	1	2000
Winter	Hockey, Girls	2	2002, 2004
Winter	Dance team, Girls	11	1985, 1999, 2004, 2008, 2009, 2011, 2014, 2015, 2017, 2018, 2022
Winter	Hockey, Boys	3	1999, 2001, 2012
Winter	Basketball, Girls	2	2006, 2010, 2023, 2024, 2025
Winter	Basketball, Boys	3	1963 & 1964 (Catholic State HS Champs), 2008
Spring	Golf, Boys	2	1963 (Catholic State HS Champs), 2003
Spring	Lacrosse, Boys	4	2007, 2010, 2011, 2021, 2022
Spring	Baseball, Boys	1	2022
Total		43	

Individual State Championships
Season	Sport	Number of Championships	Year
Fall	Swimming & Diving, Girls	10	1978, 1978, 1999, 2000, 2002, 2002, 2003, 2003, 2004, 2004
Fall	Tennis, Girls	1	2005
Fall	Cross country, Boys	2	1999, 2000
Winter	Wrestling	18	1964, 1965, 1966, 1967, 1967, 2010, 2013
Spring	Golf, Boys	1	2003
Spring	Track and field, Boys	7	2000, 2000, 2001, 2001, 2010, 2011, 2011
Total		39	

== Notable alumni ==
- Andrew Alberts, former NHL hockey player for the Vancouver Canucks
- Mark T. Vande Hei, former NASA Astronaut
- Devean George, former NBA basketball player for the Los Angeles Lakers
- Sean Lumpkin, former NFL football player for the New Orleans Saints
- Larry Mikan, basketball player for NCAA DI Minnesota Golden Gophers, and NBA Cleveland Cavaliers
- Father H. Timothy ("Tim") Vakoc – the first U.S. military chaplain to die from wounds received in the Iraq War.
- Jordan Taylor, NCAA University of Wisconsin-Madison 2008 Mr. Basketball award winner. Led the Badgers to the Sweet 16 in 2011 March Madness and 2012 March Madness
- Michael Fabiano, professional opera singer
- David Carr, journalist
- Erik Madigan Heck, photographer, founding editor of Nomenus Quarterly
- Grant Besse (2013) – Wisconsin Badgers men's ice hockey, 2013 Mr Hockey Award, drafted by the Anaheim Ducks
- Will Steger (1962), Polar Explorer, Author
- Olivia Olson (2024), basketball player
- Kelly Pannek (2014), NCAA Minnesota Golden Gophers women's ice hockey, United States women's national ice hockey team, 2018 and 2026 Olympic gold medalist
- Hilda Simms, African American actress and activist
- Julia Duffy, Emmy nominated actress
