= Syla Swords =

Canadian basketball player (born 2006)

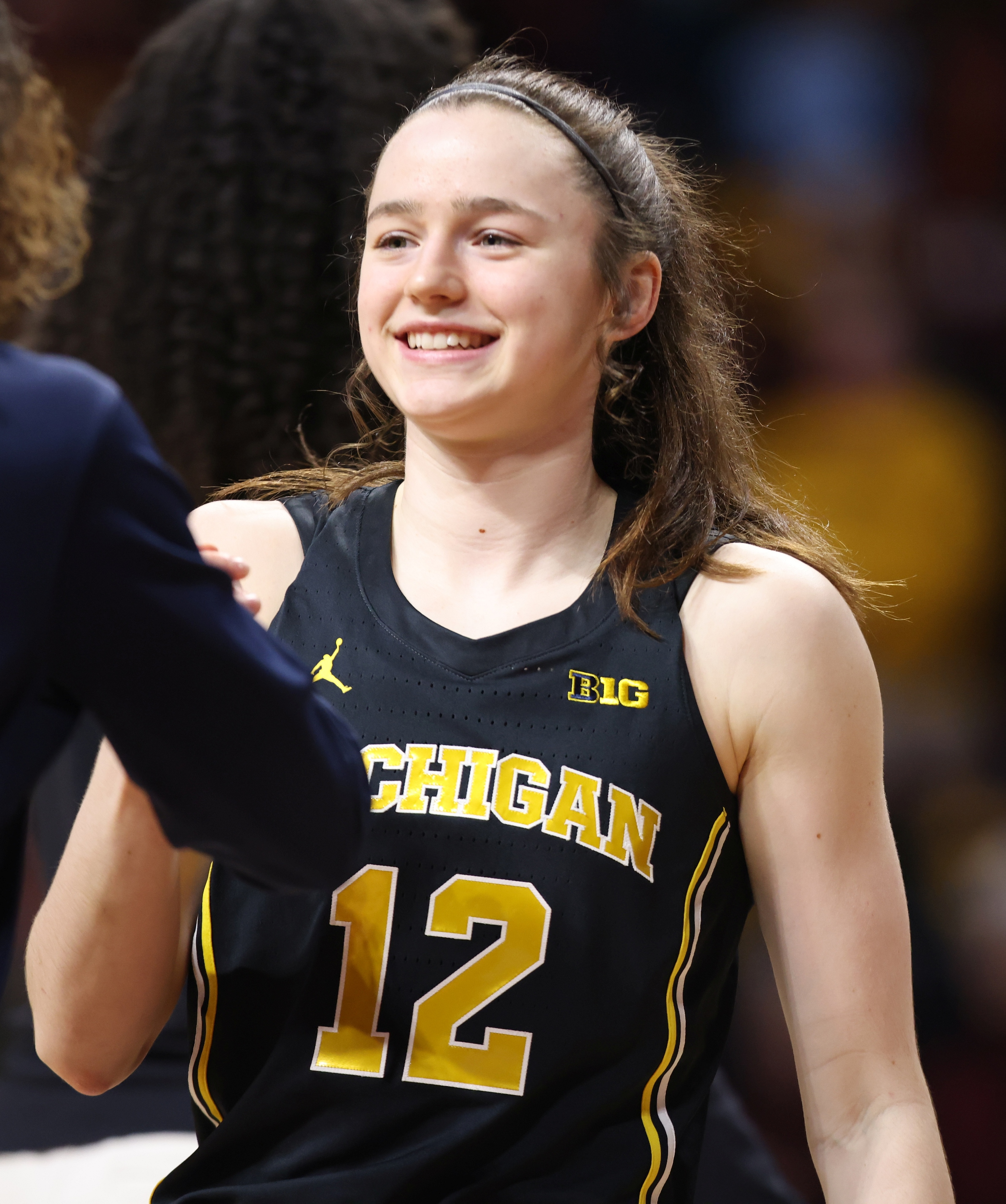
- Swords with Michigan in 2025

No. 12 – Michigan Wolverines
- Position: Guard
- League: Big Ten Conference

Personal information
- Born: January 28, 2006 (age 20) Mulhouse, France
- Listed height: 6 ft 0 in (1.83 m)

Career information
- High school: Lo-Ellen Park Secondary School (Sudbury, Ontario); Long Island Lutheran (Brookville, New York)
- College: Michigan (2024–present)

Career highlights
- First-team All-Big Ten (2026); Second-team All-Big Ten (2025); Big Ten All-Freshman Team (2025); Freshman All-American (2025); McDonald's All-American (2024); 2× Nike Hoop Summit (2023, 2024)
Medals
Women's basketball
Representing Canada
FIBA Women's AmeriCup
Bronze medal – third place	2023 Mexico
Bronze medal – third place	2025 Chile
FIBA Under-19 World Cup
Bronze medal – third place	2023 Spain	Team

Syla Swords (born January 28, 2006) is a French-Canadian college basketball player for the Michigan Wolverines of the Big Ten Conference. She earned freshman All-American in 2025, and All-Big Ten honours in 2025 and 2026. Swords is also a member of the Canadian national team and was an Olympian in 2024.

== Early life and high school career ==
Swords was born in Mulhouse, France, where her father Shawn Swords played professional basketball. She moved to Sudbury in Ontario, Canada at two years old. She began her high school career at Lo-Ellen Park Secondary School in Sudbury. She was named to the 2022 BioSteel All-Canadian Basketball Game, where she was the youngest player named to the roster. She moved to Long Island, New York after her father accepted a coaching position with the Long Island Nets in August 2022.

In her first season at Long Island Lutheran as a junior, she averaged 14.4 points, 6.1 rebounds, 4.8 assists and 1.5 steals per game to lead the Crusaders to the 2023 Class AA New York State Federation Tournament of Champions championship. She scored a game-high 27 points in the championship game and led her team all season long from behind the three-point line. She also helped Long Island Lutheran to the Nike Tournament of Champions title in 2022. Following the season she was named first-team All-Long Island by Newsday. She was named to the World Team for the inaugural women's Nike Hoop Summit in 2023. She was again named to the World Team in 2024.

On November 8, 2023, she signed her National Letter of Intent (NLI) to play college basketball at the University of Michigan. She is the highest-ranked recruit in program history at the time of signing her NLI. She was named to the 2024 McDonald's All-American Girls Game. Swords, along with incoming freshman teammate Olivia Olson, were the program's first high school signees to earn the honor. During her senior year, she averaged 17.6 points, 7.5 rebounds, 5.1 assists and 3.0 steals through 22 games, and was named the New York Gatorade Player of the Year.

== College career ==
=== Freshman season ===
On November 4, 2024, Swords made her collegiate debut for the Michigan Wolverines, and recorded a game-high 27 points and 12 rebounds, her first career double-double in a 68–62 loss to AP No. 1 South Carolina. She became only the third player since the 2009–10 season to have at least 27 points and 12 rebounds against the Gamecocks. Her 27 points were the most for a Michigan freshman in their debut in the NCAA era. On November 8, in an 86–55 victory over Lehigh, she recorded 20 points, six rebounds, five assists and one steal. She ended the third quarter on a personal 9–0 run, hitting a three-pointer as time expired in the quarter. She was subsequently named the Big Ten Conference Freshman of the Week on November 11, 2024. During the Fort Myers Tip-Off, she averaged 19.0 points and 7.0 rebounds, leading Michigan to the Shell Division Championship, where she was named tournament MVP. She was subsequently named the Big Ten Conference Freshman of the Week for a second time on December 2. On February 10, 2025, Swords earned her third Big Ten Freshman of the Week, averaging 17.0 points, 5.0 rebounds and 5.5 assists per game. During her freshman year, she averaged 16.2 points, 6.2 rebounds, 2.4 assists and 1.2 steals per game. She scored in double figures 21 times, recording eight 20-point games and one 30-point game during the regular season. During the 2025 Big Ten tournament, she led Michigan to the semifinals. In the second round against Washington, she scored 15 points. In the quarterfinals against Maryland, she scored 22 points with six assists. In the semifinals against USC, she had a game-high 26 points, six rebounds and three steals. She was subsequently named to the Big Ten All-Tournament team, becoming the fourth Wolverine and first freshman player in program history to receive the honor. Following the season, she was a second-team All-Big Ten selection, and earned Big Ten All-Freshman and Freshman All-American honors.

=== Sophomore season ===
On November 21, 2025, against No. 1 UConn, Swords scored a season-high 29 points, on a career-high eight three-pointers, along with nine rebounds and three assists. During her sophomore season, she started 28 games, scoring in double figures 22 times with four 20-point games. She averaged 14.6 points, 4.0 rebounds and 2.6 assists per game, and led the team with 68 three-pointers. She had 12 games this season with at least three triples, and ranks tenth in program history with 139 career three-pointers. She ranked fifth in the Big Ten at 2.4 triples per game. Following the season she was named a first-team All-Big Ten selection.

== National team career ==
Swords represented Canada at the 2022 FIBA Under-17 Women's Basketball World Cup where she averaged 4.7 points, four rebounds, and 2.4 assists per game, as Canada lost to France 82–84 in the bronze medal game.

She made her senior national team debut for Canada at the 2023 FIBA Women's AmeriCup where she averaged 3.9 points, 0.9 rebounds and 0.7 assists per game and won a bronze medal. She was the youngest member of the Canadian AmeriCup team. Weeks later, she represented Canada at the 2023 FIBA Under-19 Women's Basketball World Cup where she averaged 15.0 points, 3.4 rebounds and 2.1 assists per game and won a bronze medal. During the bronze-medal game, she played a game-leading 42:23 minutes, and posted 26 points, six rebounds, six assists and two steals. Following the tournament she was named to the FIBA U19 World Cup All-Second Team.

She represented Canada at the 2024 FIBA Women's Americas Pre-Qualifying Olympic Qualifying Tournament. After going undefeated during the tournament, Canada qualified for the 2024 FIBA Women's Olympic Qualifying Tournaments. On July 2, 2024, she was named to Canada's roster for the 2024 Summer Olympics. At 18 years old, she was the youngest basketball player to ever represent Canada at the Olympics.

On June 25, 2025, she was selected to represent Canada at the 2025 FIBA Women's AmeriCup. During the tournament she averaged 9.6 points, 4.9 rebounds and 2.6 assists per game and won a bronze medal. During the bronze medal game against Argentina, she scored a game-high 23 points, including the game-winning shot with two seconds remaining in double overtime to secure the victory. She was subsequently named to the FIBA Women's AmeriCup All-Tournament Team. Weeks later, she represented Canada at the 2025 FIBA Under-19 Women's Basketball World Cup, along with her Michigan teammate, Mila Holloway. During the tournament she averaged 15.9 points, 6.4 rebounds and 2.3 assists per game. During the bronze medal game, she scored 20 points, eight rebounds and three assists, as Canada lost to Spain 68–70. She was subsequently named to the FIBA U19 World Cup All-First Team.

She represented Canada at the 2026 FIBA Women's Olympic Pre-Qualifying Tournament. Scoring in double figures across all five games, she averaged 14.8 points, 3.4 rebounds, and 2.4 assists while shooting 45% from three-point range. Her performance helped Canada finish undefeated to secure a spot in the 2028 FIBA Women's Olympic Qualifying Tournaments. She was subsequently named MVP and selected to the All-Tournament Team.

== Personal life ==
Syla is the daughter of Shawn Swords and Shelley Dewar. Her father is a former professional and Olympian basketball player. He was the head coach at Laurentian University from 2007 to 2022, and currently serves as head coach for the Long Island Nets of the NBA G League. Her mother played college basketball for the Laurentian Voyageurs women's basketball team, and was the Ontario Conference rookie of the year in 1995. Her younger sister, Savvy Swords, also plays college basketball, doing so for the Kentucky Wildcats.

In April 2025, Swords was invited to Kelsey Plum's Dawg Class, an Under Armour-sponsored camp to help top college athletes transition from collegiate to professional basketball.

=== Business interests ===
On July 21, 2025, Swords was signed by Unrivaled, a 3x3 basketball league, to NIL deals as part of "The Future is Unrivaled Class of 2025".

== Career statistics ==
Legend
GP	Games played	GS	Games started	MPG	Minutes per game	RPG	Rebounds per game
APG	Assists per game	SPG	Steals per game	BPG	Blocks per game	PPG	Points per game
TO	Turnovers per game	FG%	Field-goal percentage	3P%	3-point field-goal percentage	FT%	Free-throw percentage
**Bold**	Career best	°	League leader

=== College ===
Year	Team	GP	GS	MPG	FG%	3P%	FT%	RPG	APG	SPG	BPG	TO	PPG
2024–25	Michigan	33	33	32.5	.429	.357	.870	6.2	2.5	1.2	0.0	2.8	16.0
2025–26	Michigan	34	34	33.9	.406	.340	.770	4.2	2.4	1.6	0.2	2.0	14.6
**Career**		**67**	**67**	**33.2**	**.417**	**.348**	**.830**	**5.2**	**2.4**	**1.4**	**0.1**	**2.4**	**15.3**
