= Long Island Lutheran Middle and High School =

Long Island Lutheran Middle & High School
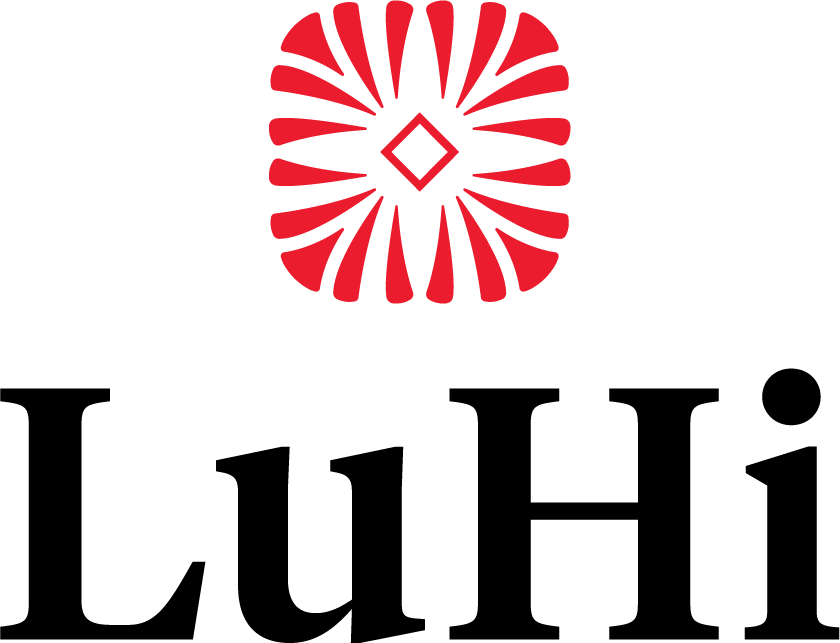

Location
- 131 Brookville Road; Brookville, New York 11545; United States; 40°49′2.45″N 73°33′1.75″W

Information
- Type: Private, parochial
- Religious affiliation: Lutheran
- Established: 1960; 66 years ago
- Principal: Jessica Raba
- Head of school: John Buck
- Grades: 6-12
- Gender: Co-educational
- Enrollment: 480
- Campus size: 32 acres (13 ha)
- Colors: Red, black, white, gray
- Mascot: Crusader
- Accreditation: New York State Association of Independent Schools
- Yearbook: Legenda
- Website: longislandlutheran.org

Long Island Lutheran Middle and High School (commonly known as LuHi) is a Christian college preparatory school in Brookville, New York, United States. It was founded in 1960 on the 32-acre (13 ha) "Highpool" estate of William Deering Howe, and has a student body of approximately 480 students in grades 6-12, with students coming from more than 60 school districts throughout Long Island and New York City. The school is accredited by the New York State Association of Independent Schools.

== Academics ==
Students follow a liberal arts curriculum, which includes required courses in English, mathematics, the natural and physical sciences, social studies and government, world language (students can choose between Spanish and French), business, religion, the fine arts, physical education, and health. Electives courses, ranging from entrepreneurship to creative writing, are also offered in all departments. LuHi also offers 19 Advanced Placement courses. Classes are scheduled using a two-day block scheduling system, which includes a weekly school-wide chapel service held in the Chapel/Performing Arts Center.

LuHi students generally perform significantly better than average on standardized high school achievement and college admissions tests, as well as AP exams. LuHi students score higher on the ACT and SAT than both the New York state and national average. In 2025, 85% of LuHi students taking AP exams scored a 3 or higher. The school had 23 AP Scholars, 4 AP Scholars with Honor, and 10 AP Scholars with Distinction.

Service learning is an important part of the LuHi experience. Students participate in many service activities throughout the year including coat, food and book drives, Habitat for Humanity Builds, service trips to Nicaragua, Mexico, Puerto Rico, and other countries, as well as a meal packing event to benefit local food pantries and the Andrew Grene School in Haiti. LuHi also offers 25 high school clubs and 14 middle school clubs.

== Athletics ==
LuHi fields 24 high school and 5 middle school sports teams, most of which compete in the Private Schools Athletic Association (PSAA)] or the Independent Private and Parochial Schools Athletic League (IPPSAL). The varsity football team competes in the Metropolitan Independent Football League, and won the league championship in 2019. However, the boys and girls varsity basketball teams compete as independents. For an overview of LuHi’s athletic programs, team offerings, and schedules, see the school’s athletics site.

LuHi is known for its highly successful boys and girls basketball programs. The boys team has won eight New York State Federation Championships, while the girls team has won four Federation titles. In March 2011, the boys team won the Class A NYS Federation Championship and the girls team won the Class B NYS Federation Championship, making LuHi only the second school in the history of the tournament to win both the boys and girls titles in the same year (Christ the King Regional High School won both in 2010). A table listing the NYS Federation Championships won by the boys and girls basketball teams is provided below.

New York State Federation Basketball Championships
Sport	Number of Championships	Years won
Boys Basketball	8	1981, 1982, 1994, 1997, 2009, 2011, 2012, 2019
Girls Basketball	4	2011, 2013, 2014, 2015

== Summer programs ==
In addition to its scholastic activities, LuHi hosts a Summer Program during the summer months. LuHi Summer Programs offer a wide variety of programs throughout four 2-week sessions including sports schools, arts & education programs, and all-around programs, which allow campers to participate in a wide range of recreational activities.

== Notable alumni ==
- Bill Chamberlain (1968), former professional basketball player for the Phoenix Suns, the Memphis Tams, the Kentucky Colonels, and the University of North Carolina
- Reggie Carter (1975), former professional basketball player for the New York Knicks and St. John's University
- Wayne McKoy (1977), former professional basketball player in Spain and for the St. John's Redmen
- Bill Wennington (1981), former professional basketball player for the Chicago Bulls, among other NBA teams, and St. John's University; 3-time NBA Champion (1996, 1997, 1998) with the Bulls; color commentator for Chicago Bulls radio broadcasts on ESPN Radio 1000
- Jipsta (1992), (attended from 1987–1989), a Top 5 Billboard recording artist; who had six consecutive Top 10 appearances on the Dance Club Songs chart published by Billboard
- Tom Kelly (1994), Stand Up Comedian; known for work as warm up comedian for ABC's The View, Good Morning America, $100,000 Pyramid. Also known for his unique takes on Long Island Culture and the Tom Kelly Show podcast.
- Vassil Evtimov (1996), former professional basketball player
- Drew Nicholas (1999), former professional basketball player for the University of Maryland; 2002 NCAA National Champion with Maryland; 2-time Euroleague Champion (2009, 2011) with Panathinaikos; 2005–06 Alphonso Ford Trophy winner as the Euroleague top scorer
- Shamar Stephen (2009), former professional American football player for the Minnesota Vikings; seventh round draft pick (220th overall) of the Minnesota Vikings in the 2014 NFL Draft; former defensive tackle for the University of Connecticut
- Kentan Facey (2013), basketball player who plays professionally in France
- Devonte Green (2016), basketball player who plays professionally in Sweden
- Sarah Mortensen (2016), basketball player who played overseas
- Jordan Walker (2017 - transferred), basketball player who plays professionally in Greece
- Messiah Swinson (2018), NFL tight-end
- André Curbelo (2019), basketball player for the Southern Miss Golden Eagles. Also plays nationally for Puerto Rico
- Zed Key (2020), basketball player or the Dayton Flyers
- Ryan Dunn (2021), basketball player for the Phoenix Suns
- V. J. Edgecombe (2024), basketball player for the Philadelphia 76ers
- Kate Koval (2024), college basketball player
- Syla Swords (2024), basketball player for the Michigan Wolverines, represented Canada at the 2024 Summer Olympics
- Kiyan Anthony (2025), basketball player for the Syracuse Orange, son of Carmelo Anthony.
- Savvy Swords (2026), basketball player
