= Michigan Wolverines women's basketball statistical leaders =

The Michigan Wolverines women's basketball statistical leaders are individual statistical leaders of the Michigan Wolverines women's basketball program in various categories, including points, rebounds, assists, steals, and blocks. Within those areas, the lists identify single-game, single-season, and career leaders. The Wolverines represent the University of Michigan in the NCAA's Big Ten Conference.

Michigan began competing in intercollegiate basketball in 1973. The NCAA did not officially record assists as a stat until the 1983–84 season, and blocks and steals until the 1985–86 season, but Michigan's record books includes players in these stats before these seasons.. Records are updated through games played on November 8, 2026.

== Scoring ==
Career
Rk	Player	Points	Seasons
1	Katelynn Flaherty	2,776	2014–15 2015–16 2016–17 2017–18
2	Naz Hillmon	2,183	2018–19 2019–20 2020–21 2021–22
3	Hallie Thome	2,081	2015–16 2016–17 2017–18 2018–19
4	Diane Dietz	2,076	1978–79 1979–80 1980–81 1981–82
5	Jennifer Smith	1,714	2000–01 2001–02 2002–03 2003–04
6	Trish Andrew	1,647	1989–90 1990–91 1991–92 1992–93
7	Wendy Bradetich	1,587	1982–83 1983–84 1984–85 1985–86
8	Stacey Thomas	1,556	1996–97 1997–98 1998–99 1999–2000
9	Abby Currier	1,550	1977–78 1978–79 1979–80 1980–81
10	Alayne Ingram	1,461	1998–99 1999–2000 2000–01 2001–02

Season
Rk	Player	Points	Season
1	Katelynn Flaherty	774	2015–16
2	Katelynn Flaherty	757	2017–18
3	Katelynn Flaherty	746	2016–17
4	Olivia Olson	663	2025–26
5	Jennifer Smith	659	2003–04
6	Naz Hillmon	652	2021–22
7	Hallie Thome	600	2016–17
8	Peg Harte	581	1982–83
9	Hallie Thome	574	2017–18
10	Diane Dietz	562	1981–82

Single game
Rk	Player	Points	Season	Opponent
1	Naz Hillmon	50	2020–21	Ohio State
2	Diane Dietz	45	1981–82	Illinois
3	Katelynn Flaherty	38	2016–17	Ohio State
4	Hallie Thome	37	2016–17	Wisconsin
	Diane Dietz	37	1979–80	Grand Valley State
	Jennifer Smith	37	2002–03	Charlotte

== Rebounds ==
Career
Rk	Player	Rebounds	Seasons
1	Naz Hillmon	1,063	2018–19 2019–20 2020–21 2021–22
2	Trish Andrew	928	1989–90, 1990–91, 1991–92, 1992–93
3	Hallie Thome	885	2015–16 2016–17 2017–18 2018–19
4	Jillian Dunston	862	2014–15 2015–16 2016–17 2017–18
5	Stacey Thomas	851	1996–97 1997–98 1998–99 1999–2000
6	Pollyanna Johns	827	1994–95 1995–96 1996–97 1997–98
7	Tanya Powell	820	1986–87 1987–88 1988–89 1989–90
8	Tabitha Pool	808	2001–02 2002–03 2003–04 2004–05
9	LeeAnn Bies	790	1999–2000 2000–01 2001–02 2002–03
10	Jennifer Smith	761	2000–01 2001–02 2002–03 2003–04

Season
Rk	Player	Rebounds	Season
1	Cyesha Goree	367	2014–15
2	Cyesha Goree	317	2013–14
3	Trish Andrew	311	1992–93
4	Naz Hillmon	298	2021–22
5	Jillian Dunston	297	2017–18
6	Jillian Dunston	286	2016–17
7	Trish Andrew	278	1991–92
8	Naz Hillmon	277	2019–20
9	Pollyanna Johns	276	1997–98
10	Hallie Thome	263	2016–17

Single game
Rk	Player	Rebounds	Season	Opponent
1	Theresa Conlin	24	1977–78	Detroit
2	Naz Hillmon	22	2020–21	Nebraska
3	Trish Andrew	21	1991–92	Bucknell
4	Cyesha Goree	20	2014–15	Minnesota
	Trish Andrew	20	1990–91	Washington
	Abby Currier	20	1979–79	Notre Dame

== Assists ==
Career
Rk	Player	Assists	Seasons
1	Siera Thompson	553	2013–14 2014–15 2015–16 2016–17
2	Anne Thorius	537	1997–98 1998–99 1999–2000 2000–01
3	Jenny Ryan	489	2009–10 2010–11 2011–12 2012–13
4	Lori Gnatkowski	402	1980–81 1981–82 1982–83 1983–84
5	Katelynn Flaherty	400	2014–15 2015–16 2016–17 2017–18
6	Amy Dilk	388	2018–19 2019–20 2020–21 2021–22
7	Jessica Minnfield	387	2005–06 2006–07 2007–08 2008–09
8	Carol Szczechowski	385	1987–88 1988–89 1989–90 1990–91
9	Alayne Ingram	377	1998–99 1999–2000 2000–01 2001–02
10	Mila Holloway	315	2024–25 2025–26

Season
Rk	Player	Assists	Season
1	Siera Thompson	178	2015–16
	Siera Thompson	178	2016–17
3	Leigha Brown	174	2022–23
4	Jenny Ryan	167	2012–13
	Mila Holloway	167	2025–26
6	Vonnie Thompson	156	1987–88
7	Shannon Smith	155	2014–15
8	Mila Holloway	148	2024–25
9	Vonnie Thompson	147	1986–87
10	Anne Thorius	145	2000–01
	Anne Thorius	145	1998–99
	Amy Dilk	145	2019–20

Single game
Rk	Player	Assists	Season	Opponent
1	Shannon Smith	13	2013–14	Stony Brook
2	Jenny Ryan	12	2010–11	Illinois State
	Vonnie Thompson	12	1986–87	Northeastern
	Lori Gnatkowski	12	1981–82	Illinois
5	Leigha Brown	11*	2022–23	Northwestern

*11 assists in a game has occurred 12 times in Michigan history. Leigha Brown is the most recent occurrence of this.

== Steals ==
Career
Rk	Player	Steals	Seasons
1	Stacey Thomas	372	1996–97 1997–98 1998–99 1999–2000
2	Jenny Ryan	291	2009–10 2010–11 2011–12 2012–13
3	Lori Gnatkowski	266	1980–81 1981–82 1982–83 1983–84
4	Diane Dietz	229	1978–79 1979–80 1980–81 1981–82
5	Carol Szczechowski	214	1987–88 1988–89 1989–90 1990–91
6	Veronica Hicks	167	2007–08 2008–09 2009–10 2010–11
7	Silver Shellman	165	1993–94 1994–95 1995–96 1996–97
8	Jessica Minnfield	164	2005–06 2006–07 2007–08 2008–09
9	Siera Thompson	160	2013–14 2014–15 2015–16 2016–17
10	Tabitha Pool	157	2001–02 2002–03 2003–04 2004–05
	Jillian Dunston	157	2014–15 2015–16 2016–17 2017–18

Season
Rk	Player	Steals	Season
1	Stacey Thomas	110	1998–99
2	Stacey Thomas	102	1999–2000
3	Jenny Ryan	98	2011–12
4	Stacey Thomas	89	1997–98
5	Brooke Quarles-Daniels	86	2025–26
6	Lori Gnatkowski	81	1980–81
7	Carol Szczechowski	79	1990–91
8	Lori Gnatkowski	72	1981–82
9	Stacey Thomas	71	1996–97
10	Veronica Hicks	67	2009–10
	Jenny Ryan	67	2009–10

Single game
Rk	Player	Steals	Season	Opponent
1	Stacey Thomas	10	1999–2000	Northwestern
	Jennifer Kiefer	10	1993–94	Wisconsin
3	Jenny Ryan	9	2010–11	Florida Atlantic
	Terry Schevers	9	1978–79	Wisconsin
5	Brooke Quarles Daniels	8*	2025–26	Canisius

*8 steals in a game has occurred 9 times in Michigan history. Brooke Quarles Daniels is the most recent occurrence of this.

== Blocks ==
Career
Rk	Player	Blocks	Seasons
1	Trish Andrew	367	1989–90 1990–91 1991–92 1992–93
2	Hallie Thome	202	2015–16 2016–17 2017–18 2018–19
3	Krista Phillips	176	2006–07 2007–08 2008–09 2009–10
4	LeeAnn Bies	136	1999–2000 2000–01 2001–02 2002–03
5	Patrice Donovon	118	1979–80 1980–81 1981–82
6	Lisa Reynolds	104	1985–86 1986–87 1987–88
	Stephany Skrba	104	2005–06 2006–07 2007–08 2008–09
8	Jennifer Brzezinski	97	1992–93 1993–94 1994–95 1995–96
9	Kate Thompson	90	2009–10 2010–11 2011–12 2012–13
10	Hailey Brown	86	2017–18 2018–19 2019–20 2020–21

Season
Rk	Player	Blocks	Season
1	Trish Andrew	136	1991–92
2	Trish Andrew	88	1990–91
3	Trish Andrew	79	1992–93
4	Patrice Donovan	74	1981–82
	Hallie Thome	74	2016–17
6	Yvette Harris	71	1978-79
7	Val Driscoll	70	2013–14
8	Trish Andrew	64	1989–90
9	Krista Phillips	62	2009–10
10	Lisa Reynolds	56	1986–87

Single game
Rk	Player	Blocks	Season	Opponent
1	Patrice Donovan	11	1981–82	Wayne State
	Katie McNamara	11	1978–79	Michigan State
3	Trish Andrew	10	1991–92	Old Dominion
	Penny Neer	10	1978–79	Illinois
5	Trish Andrew	9*	1991–92	Ohio State

*9 blocks in a game has occurred 6 times in Michigan history. Trish Andrew is the most recent occurrence of this.

== Three-point field goals ==
=== Three-pointers made ===
Career
Rk	Player	Three-pointers	Seasons
1	Katelynn Flaherty	410	2014–15 2015–16 2016–17 2017–18
2	Siera Thompson	240	2013–14 2014–15 2015–16 2016–17
3	Carmen Reynolds	205	2008–09 2009–10 2010–11 2011–12
4	Kate Thompson	198	2009–10 2010–11 2011–12 2012–13
5	Nicole Munger	183	2015–16 2016–17 2017–18 2018–19
6	Alayne Ingram	182	1998–99 1999–2000 2000–01 2001–02
7	Maddie Nolan	167	2019–20 2020–21 2021–22 2022–23
8	Carly Benson	164	2005–06 2006–07 2007–08 2008–09
9	Syla Swords	160	2024–25 2025–26 2026–27
10	Hailey Brown	143	2017–18 2018–19 2019–20 2020–21

Season
Rk	Player	Three-pointers	Season
1	Katelynn Flaherty	118	2017–18
2	Kate Thompson	110	2012–13
3	Katelynn Flaherty	109	2016–17
4	Katelynn Flaherty	105	2015–16
5	Carmen Reynolds	85	2009–10
6	Syla Swords	84	2025–26
7	Katelynn Flaherty	78	2014–15
8	Siera Thompson	75	2013–14
	Kysre Gondrezick	75	2016–17
10	Siera Thompson	73	2014–15

Single game
Rk	Player	Three-pointers	Season	Opponent
1	Katelynn Flaherty	10	2017–18	Penn State
2	Katelynn Flaherty	9	2017–18	Northwestern
3	Katelynn Flaherty	8	2016–17	Ohio State
	Syla Swords	8	2025–26	Connecticut
5	Maddie Nolan	7	2021–22	Maryland
	Nicole Munger	7	2018–19	Washington
	Katelynn Flaherty	7	2016–17	Virginia Tech
	Kate Thompson	7	2012–13	Northwestern
9	Syla Swords	6*	2024–25	Minnesota

*6 three-pointers in a game has occurred 18 times in Michigan history. Syla Swords is the most recent occurrence of this.
