= Jennifer Smith (basketball) =

American basketball player (born 1982)

Personal information
- Born: April 10, 1982 (age 43) Lansing, Michigan, U.S.
- Listed height: 6 ft 3 in (1.91 m)

Career information
- High school: DeWitt (DeWitt, Michigan)
- College: Michigan (2000–2004)
- WNBA draft: 2004: 3rd round, 32nd overall pick
- Drafted by: Detroit Shock
- Position: Center

Career history
- 2005: New York Liberty

Career highlights
- First-team All-Big Ten (2004)
- Stats at Basketball Reference

Jennifer Smith (born April 10, 1982) is an American former basketball player. She played college basketball at the University of Michigan from 2000 to 2004 and set the Michigan Wolverines women's basketball single-season scoring record with 659 points during the 2003–04 season. She is currently the head coach of the Great Lakes Christian College Women's Basketball program.

== Early life ==
Smith was born in 1982 and grew up in DeWitt, Michigan. She played basketball at DeWitt High School, finishing in 2000 with 1,011 career points. In 1999, she led DeWitt on a 25-game win streak and Michigan's Class B semi-finals. She was inducted into the DeWitt High School Hall of Fame in 2008.

== College career ==
Smith played for the Michigan Wolverines women's basketball team from 2000 to 2004. As a senior during the 2003–04 season, Smith scored 659 points, a total that remains Michigan's single-season scoring record. She led the Big Ten Conference with an average of 21.3 points per game as a senior, an average that ranks second best in Michigan history behind Diane Dietz who averaged 21.6 points per game during the 1981–82 season. She also set the school record for free throws made in a season with 210 during the 2003–04 season. In all four years at Michigan, Smith scored 1,714 points, a total that is second only to Dietz in the program's history. She also ranks second to Dietz in single-game scoring. Smith scored 37 points against Charlotte on December 3, 2003. In 2004, she was honored with the university's M-Zone Award, which recognizes leadership and character, and media voters selected her for the All-Big Ten first team.

== Professional career ==
Smith played one season in the WNBA for the New York Liberty. She also played professional basketball for the Good Angels in Slovakia.

== Career statistics ==
Legend
GP	Games played	GS	Games started	MPG	Minutes per game	RPG	Rebounds per game
APG	Assists per game	SPG	Steals per game	BPG	Blocks per game	PPG	Points per game
TO	Turnovers per game	FG%	Field-goal percentage	3P%	3-point field-goal percentage	FT%	Free-throw percentage
**Bold**	Career best	°	League leader

=== WNBA ===
==== Regular season ====
WNBA regular season statistics
Year	Team	GP	GS	MPG	FG%	3P%	FT%	RPG	APG	SPG	BPG	TO	PPG
2004	Did not play (waived)												
2005	New York	2	0	3.5	0.0	—	—	0.0	0.0	0.0	0.0	0.0	0.0
**Career**	1 year, 1 team	2	0	3.5	0.0	—	—	0.0	0.0	0.0	0.0	0.0	0.0

=== College ===
NCAA statistics
Year	Team	GP	Points	FG%	3P%	FT%	RPG	APG	SPG	BPG	PPG
2000–01	Michigan	**31**	292	**55.2**	0.0	81.4	4.6	0.7	0.3	0.3	9.4
2001–02	Michigan	30	412	51.6	33.3	79.5	**7.8**	**1.3**	0.9	**0.5**	13.7
2002–03	Michigan	24	353	54.3	**40.0**	**84.0**	6.5	0.7	0.7	0.4	14.7
2003–04	Michigan	**31**	**659**	47.7	34.2	80.5	7.4	0.8	**1.0**	0.2	**21.3**
**Career**		116	1716	51.3	35.5	81.0	6.6	0.9	0.7	0.4	14.8
