= Naz Hillmon =

American basketball player (born 2000)

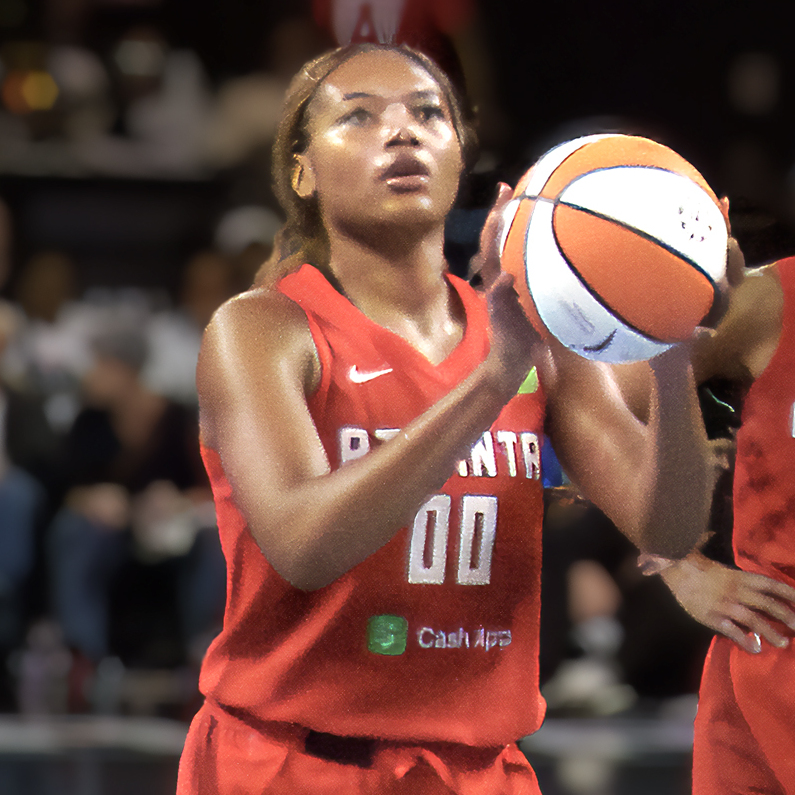
- Hillmon with Atlanta Dream in 2025

No. 00 – Atlanta Dream
- Position: Power forward
- League: WNBA

Personal information
- Born: April 5, 2000 (age 26) Cleveland, Ohio, U.S.
- Listed height: 6 ft 2 in (1.88 m)
- Listed weight: 190 lb (86 kg)

Career information
- High school: Gilmour Academy (Gates Mills, Ohio)
- College: Michigan (2018–2022)
- WNBA draft: 2022: 2nd round, 15th overall pick
- Drafted by: Atlanta Dream
- Playing career: 2022–present

Career history
- 2022–present: Atlanta Dream
- 2023–2024: Melbourne Boomers
- 2024–2025: Southside Flyers
- 2026–present: Laces

Career highlights
- WNBA Sixth Player of the Year (2025); All-WNBL First Team (2025); All-WNBL Second Team (2024); 2× First-team All-American – USBWA (2021, 2022); 2× WBCA Coaches' All-American (2021, 2022); First-team All-American – AP (2022); Second-team All-American – AP (2021); Big Ten Player of the Year (2021); All-Big Ten Defensive team (2022); 4× First-team All-Big Ten (2019–2022); Big Ten All-Freshman Team (2019); Big Ten Freshman of the Year (2019); Big Ten Sixth Player of the Year (2019)
- Stats at Basketball Reference
Medals
Representing United States
Women's basketball
FIBA AmeriCup
Gold medal – first place	2021 Puerto Rico
FIBA U19 Women's World Cup
Gold medal – first place	2019 Thailand	Team
FIBA Americas U18 Championship
Gold medal – first place	2018 Mexico	Team
Women's 3x3 basketball
FIBA 3x3 AmeriCup
Gold medal – first place	2025 León

Nazahrah Ansaria Hillmon (born April 5, 2000) is an American professional basketball player for the Atlanta Dream of the Women's National Basketball Association (WNBA) and for Hive of Unrivaled. She played college basketball at Michigan, where she is Michigan's all-time leader in rebounds, double-doubles, and free throws made. As a junior she was named a first-team All-American and Big Ten Player of the Year. She also represented the United States at the 2019 FIBA Under-19 World Cup and won a gold medal.

== High school career ==
Hillmon played four varsity seasons at Gilmour Academy in Gates Mills, Ohio where she started in all 116 career games and amassed 2,057 points and 1,607 rebounds to become the school's all-time leading scorer and rebounder. Hillmon averaged 21 points, 14 rebounds, 2.7 blocks and 2.0 steals per game as a senior to help lead the Lancers to their first OHSAA Division III state championship, after winning back-to-back district and regional titles. Following an outstanding season, she was named the Division III Northeast Lakes All-District Player of the Year for a second straight season, the All-Ohio Co-Player of the Year and was named a finalist for Ms. Basketball. She became the fourth girls basketball player in state history to score 2,000 points in a high school career. Hillmon verbally committed to play basketball at Michigan on July 4, 2017, following her graduation from Gilmour Academy.

== College career ==
=== Freshman season ===
During the 2018–19 season, Hillmon appeared in all 34 games for the Wolverines off the bench, averaging a team-high 13.1 points, 7.0 rebounds and .628 field goal percentage per game. She also had a team-high eight double-doubles during the season. She finished sixth nationally in field goal percentage, the only freshman in the top 50. Following an outstanding season, she was named Big Ten Conference Freshman of the Year by the media, Big Ten Conference Sixth Player of the Year by the coaches, the Big Ten All-First Team and the Big Ten Conference All-Freshman team.

=== Sophomore season ===
During the 2019–20 season, Hillmon started all 32 games, scoring in double figures 28 times with 11 double-doubles. She ranked in the top five in Big Ten scoring in points per game (17.4), rebounds per game (8.7) and field-goal percentage (.567). She finished the season with 558 points (9th), 277 rebounds (7th) and shot 56.7 percent (7th) to rank in the top 10 of Michigan all-time season records. Following the season she was named a unanimous All-Big Ten first team selection by both the coaches and media.

=== Junior season ===
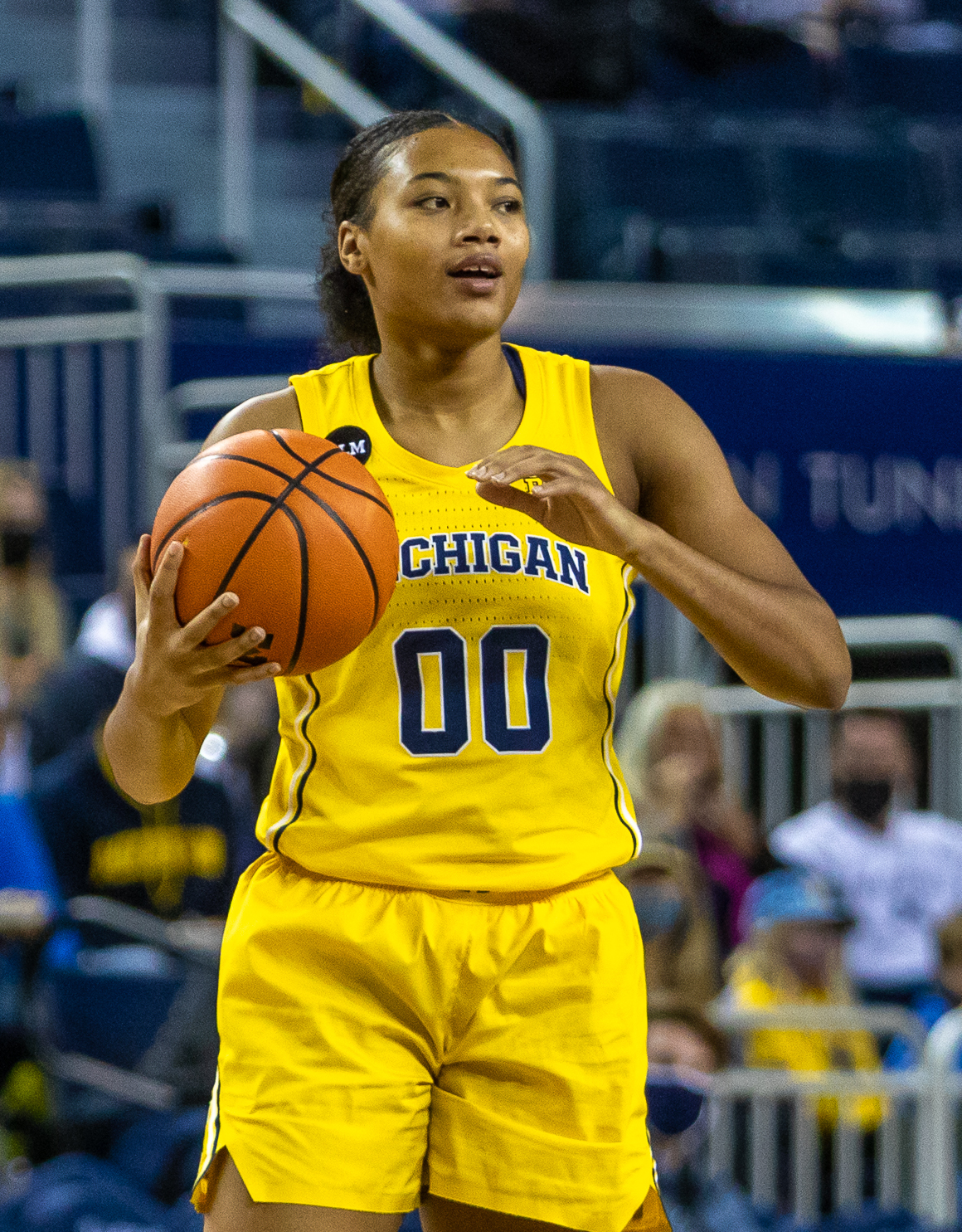
Hillmon with Michigan in 2021.

During the 2020–21 season, Hillmon was named Big Ten Preseason Co-Player of the Year, and named to watch lists for the Katrina McClain Award, the Wade Trophy and Naismith College Player of the Year. On January 21, 2021, Hillmon recorded a career-high 50 points and 16 rebounds, setting the all-time single-game scoring record in Michigan program history, man or woman, and recording the first 50-point game in Michigan basketball history. She surpassed the previous women's record of 45 points set by Diane Dietz in 1982, and men's record of 48 points set by Rudy Tomjanovich in 1969. She also set a new program record for field goals made with 20. She became the second player in Michigan women's basketball history to score more than 40 points, and the third woman with a 50-point game in Big Ten basketball history.

On March 4, 2021, Hillmon was named a finalist for the Katrina McClain Award for the second straight year. Hillmon ranks fourth nationally in scoring at 25.1 points per game while coming in second in field goal percentage (.648), 17th in rebounding (11.3) and 26th in double-doubles (10). Hillmon has scored at least 18 points in all but one game this season. Following an outstanding season, she was named a unanimous All-Big Ten first team selection by both the coaches and media and named the Big Ten Conference Player of the Year. She became the second player in Big Ten history to earn Freshman of the Year, Sixth Player of the Year and Player of the Year honors in a career. She was named a first-team All-American by Sports Illustrated and USBWA and a second-team All-American by the Associated Press. Hillmon became the first Wolverine to be selected for All-America honors in program history. She was also named University of Michigan Athlete of the Year.

=== Senior season ===
During the 2021–22 season, Hillmon was named Big Ten Preseason Player of the Year, and named to watch lists for the Katrina McClain Award, and the Wade Trophy. On January 27, 2022, Hillmon recorded 20 points and 12 rebounds to become Michigan's all-time leading rebounder, passing the previous record of 928 set by Trish Andrew in 1993. Following her outstanding performance, she was named USBWA National Player of the Week. On February 27, Hillmon recorded 18 points and 15 rebounds to become the first player in Michigan program history, man or woman, to score 2,000 points and record 1,000 rebounds. During the 2022 NCAA tournament, she helped Michigan advance to the Elite Eight for the first time in program history, as she recorded a double-double in all four games of the tournament.

Following an outstanding season, she was named a unanimous All-Big Ten first team selection by both the coaches and media, and named to the all-defensive team. On March 10, 2022, Hillmon was named a finalist for the Katrina McClain Award for the third straight year. Hillmon averaged 21.0 points, 9.6 rebounds and 2.2 assists in 33.5 minutes per game, and recorded 17 double-doubles, to move into first place all-time at Michigan. She was named a first-team All-American by the Associated Press, becoming the first player in program history to earn a first-team honor from the AP. She was also named a first-team All-American by WBCA, USBWA, The Athletic, Sports Illustrated and the Wooden Award. She finished her career at Michigan as the program leader in rebounds (1,063), double-doubles (52) and free throws made (487). She ranks second all-time in scoring with 2,183 points, playing 21 fewer games than all-time leading scorer Katelynn Flaherty (2,776).

On March 29, 2022, Hillmon renounced her extra year of eligibility due to the COVID-19 pandemic and declared for the 2022 WNBA draft.

== Professional career ==
=== WNBA ===
==== Atlanta Dream (2022–present) ====
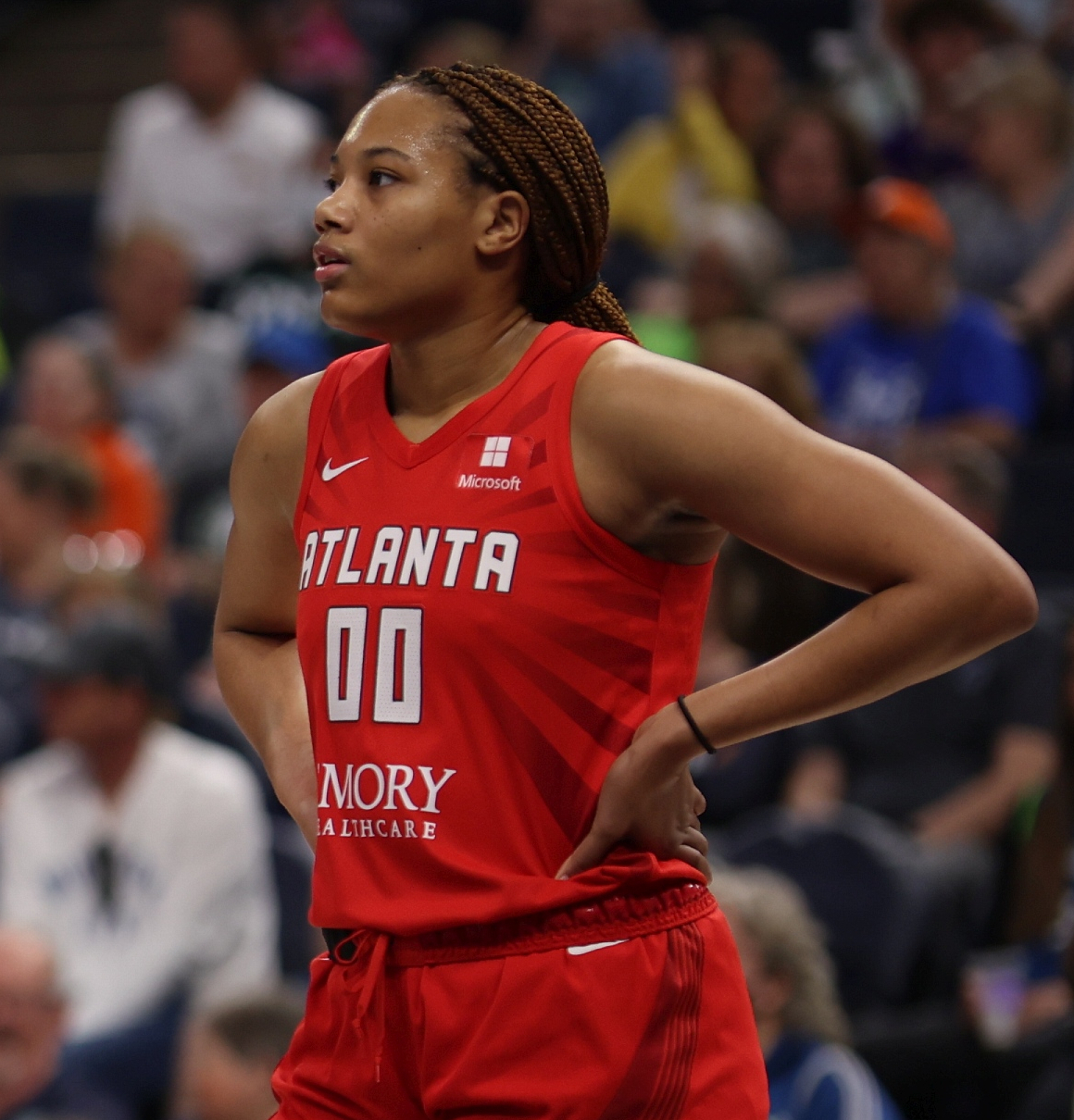
Hillmon with the Atlanta Dream in 2023.

On April 11, 2022, Hillmon was drafted in the second round, 15th overall, by the Atlanta Dream in the 2022 WNBA draft. She became Michigan's highest WNBA draft pick ever, and the first Wolverine drafted since Tabitha Pool in 2005. During her rookie season with the Dream, Hillmon averaged 4.4 points and 5.1 rebounds in 34 games. She set Atlanta's franchise rookie rebounding record with 172, and ranked fifth in the league in rookie rebounding.

During the 2025 WNBA season, Hillmon averaged 8.6 points and 6.2 rebounds for the Dream and made 53 three-pointers after hitting just one during her first three WNBA seasons. She came off the bench in 27 of the Dream's 44 games and set a franchise record by appearing in 150 consecutive games. She ranked second in the league with a +7.6 plus–minus per game. Following the season she was named the WNBA Sixth Player of the Year.

=== WNBL ===
On October 4, 2023, Hillmon signed a one-year contract with the Melbourne Boomers for the 2023–24 WNBL season. During her first year with the Boomers she averaged 15.1 points and 9.5 rebounds per game, and was named to the All-WNBL second-team.

On October 3, 2024, Hillmon signed a contract with the Southside Flyers for the 2024–25 WNBL season.

=== Unrivaled ===
In March 2025, Hillmon was signed by Unrivaled to a relief player contract due to multiple lingering injuries within the league at the end of the 2025 season.

On November 5, 2025, it was announced that Hillmon will play for Laces BC in the 2026 season. She joined Hive BC for the 2027 season.

== National team career ==
Hillmon represented the United States at the 2018 FIBA Under-18 Americas Championship, where she averaged 10.3 points and 5.7 rebounds per game and shot 67 percent in 18.2 minutes per game, and won a gold medal. Hillmon represented the United States at the 2019 FIBA Under-19 Basketball World Cup where she was team captain. She started all seven games of the 2019 tournament, averaging 7.4 points and a team-high 7.6 rebounds per game and won a gold medal. On June 6, 2021, Hillmon was named to team USA for the 2021 FIBA AmeriCup. During the tournament, Hillmon recorded one double-double, and averaged 11.8 points, 7.8 rebounds and 1.5 assists in 21.5 minutes per game, to help lead USA to a gold medal.

== Personal life ==
Hillmon's mother NaSheema Hillmon played college basketball at Vanderbilt and professionally for the Nashville Noise of the American Basketball League (ABL). Hillmon’s father Fred Baker played both basketball and football for Vanderbilt University. Hillmon is the niece of professional basketball player Jawad Williams.

== Career statistics ==
Legend
GP	Games played	GS	Games started	MPG	Minutes per game	RPG	Rebounds per game
APG	Assists per game	SPG	Steals per game	BPG	Blocks per game	PPG	Points per game
TO	Turnovers per game	FG%	Field-goal percentage	3P%	3-point field-goal percentage	FT%	Free-throw percentage
**Bold**	Career best	°	League leader

=== WNBA ===
==== Regular season ====
WNBA regular season statistics
Year	Team	GP	GS	MPG	FG%	3P%	FT%	RPG	APG	SPG	BPG	TO	PPG
2022	Atlanta	34	12	19.8	.480	.000	.821	5.1	1.2	.6	.3	1.2	4.4
2023	Atlanta	40	3	13.5	.509	.000	**.852**	3.4	.7	.2	.1	**1.0**	4.1
2024	Atlanta	40	19	21.7	**.552**	**.333**	.762	4.8	1.3	**.7**	.3	**1.0**	5.7
2025	Atlanta	**44**	17	25.5	.463	.321	.831	**6.2**	**2.4**	.5	**.4**	1.1	8.6
2026	Atlanta	43	**41**	**28.7**	.461	.306	.818	4.6	1.6	.6	**.4**	1.3	**9.1**
**Career**	5 years, 1 team	201	92	22.1	.484	.311	.815	4.8	1.5	.5	.3	1.1	6.5

==== Playoffs ====
WNBA playoff statistics
Year	Team	GP	GS	MPG	FG%	3P%	FT%	RPG	APG	SPG	BPG	TO	PPG
2023	Atlanta	2	0	14.0	**1.000**	—	—	2.0	1.0	**.5**	.0	**1.0**	1.0
2024	Atlanta	2	2	24.0	.538	—	**1.000**	6.5	.5	**.5**	.0	2.0	7.5
2025	Atlanta	**3**	**3**	**34.0**	.462	**.308**	.714	**8.7**	**2.3**	.3	**1.0**	1.7	**11.0**
**Career**	3 years, 1 team	7	5	25.4	.500	.308	.750	6.1	1.4	.4	.4	1.6	7.1

=== College ===
Year	Team	GP	GS	MPG	FG%	3P%	FT%	RPG	APG	SPG	BPG	PPG
2018–19	Michigan	**34**	0	23.2	**.628**	.000	.632	7.0	1.1	1.0	.2	13.1
2019–20	Michigan	32	**32**	33.3	.567	.000	.644	8.7	**2.4**	.8	.3	17.4
2020–21	Michigan	22	22	**33.6**	.623	.000	**.757**	**11.4**	1.3	.6	.4	**24.0**
2021–22	Michigan	29	28	33.0	.580	.000	.729	9.6	2.1	**1.2**	**.5**	21.3
**Career**		117	82	30.4	.596	.000	.696	8.9	1.7	.9	.4	18.4

== See also ==
- Michigan Wolverines women's basketball statistical leaders
