= Melanie Moore (basketball) =

American basketball coach

Current position
- Title: Assistant coach
- Team: Michigan
- Conference: Big Ten

Biographical details
- Born: Glandorf, Ohio, U.S.
- Education: Siena University

Playing career
- 1995–1999: Siena

Coaching career (HC unless noted)
- 2002–2004: Siena (assistant)
- 2004–2006: Indiana State (assistant)
- 2006–2007: Dayton (assistant)
- 2007–2012: Princeton (assistant)
- 2012–2018: Michigan (assistant)
- 2018–2019: Michigan (associate HC)
- 2019–2023: Xavier
- 2023–present: Michigan (assistant)

Head coaching record
- Overall: 24–81 (.229)

Melanie Moore is an American college basketball coach and former player, currently an assistant coach at the University of Michigan. She rejoined the Wolverines program in 2023, previously serving as an assistant from 2012 until 2019, before she was the head coach at Xavier University from 2019 to 2023.

== Playing career ==
Moore played for the Siena Saints from 1995 until 1999. She remains the all-time leading rebounder and ranks second in total scoring in Siena's DI history with 1,122 rebounds and 2,021 points. She was named the Metro Atlantic Athletic Conference (MAAC) Player of the Year in 1998 and 1999. After graduation she played professionally overseas in Luxembourg and Israel for two years.

== Coaching career ==
=== Siena ===
In 2001, Moore returned to her alma mater, Siena University, as an admission's officer, before joining the coaching staff as an assistant in 2002.

=== Indiana State ===
In 2004, Moore joined Indiana State University, where she remained for two years.

=== Dayton ===
In 2006, Moore was hired at the University of Dayton for one season as an assistant.

=== Princeton ===
In 2007, Moore received an assistant coaching job at Princeton University. She coached there for five seasons.

=== Michigan ===
In 2012, Moore was named an assistant coach at Michigan. On May 18, 2018, she was promoted to associate head coach, under head coach Kim Barnes Arico.

=== Xavier ===
On April 5, 2019, Moore was named head coach for the Xavier Musketeers. She replaced Brian Neal, who stepped down as head coach of the program at the end of the 2018–19 season.

=== Michigan (second stint) ===
On March 30, 2023, Moore returned to Michigan as an assistant coach.

== Personal life ==
Moore is married to her husband, Joe, and has two children, Tristin and Ayla.

== Head coaching record ==
=== College ===
Record table
| Season | Team | Overall | Conference | Standing | Postseason |
|---|---|---|---|---|---|
Xavier Musketeers (Big East Conference) (2019–2023)
| 2019–20 | Xavier | 3–27 | 2–16 | T-9th | |
| 2020–21 | Xavier | 5–10 | 2–8 | 9th | |
| 2021–22 | Xavier | 9–21 | 4–16 | 10th | |
| 2022–23 | Xavier | 7–23 | 0–20 | 11th | |
| Xavier: | | 24–81 (.229) | 8–60 (.118) | | |
| Total: | | 24–81 (.229) | | | |
National champion Postseason invitational champion Conference regular season champion Conference regular season and conference tournament champion Division regular season champion Division regular season and conference tournament champion Conference tournament champion
