= DeWitt High School =

DeWitt High School may refer to:

- DeWitt High School (Arkansas) – De Witt, Arkansas
- DeWitt High School (Michigan) – DeWitt, Michigan
- DeWitt Clinton High School – Bronx, New York
- Jamesville-DeWitt High School – DeWitt, New York
