= Skrba =

Skrba, Škrba is a Serb-Croatian surname. Notable people with the surname include:

- Dragan Škrba (born 1962), Bosnian footballer
- Stephany Skrba (born 1987), Canadian-Serbian basketball player
