= Trish Andrew =

American former basketball player

Personal information
- Born: Winnetka, Illinois, U.S.
- Listed height: 6 ft 3 in (1.91 m)

Career information
- High school: New Trier; Winnetka, Illinois
- College: Michigan (1989–1993)
- Position: Forward / Center

Trish Andrew (born c. 1971) is an American former basketball player. She played college basketball at the University of Michigan from 1989 to 1993. She holds the Michigan Wolverines women's basketball records for, single-season rebounds (311), career blocks (367), and single-season blocks (136).

== Early years ==
A native of Winnetka, Illinois, Andrew played high school basketball at New Trier High School. Because of her talent for rebounding and blocking shots, she earned the nickname the "human eraser." She was named to the Chicago Tribune's All-State team in 1989.

== University of Michigan ==
In the fall of 1989, Andrew enrolled at the University of Michigan. She played for the Michigan Wolverines women's basketball team from 1989 to 1993.

As a freshman during the 1989-90 season, Andrew broke Michigan's single-season record with 64 blocked shots and helped lead the Wolverines to a 20-10 record. The season was the program's first 20-win season and the first in which the Wolverines received an invitation to play in the NCAA Tournament.

As a sophomore during the 1990-91 season, Andrew broke her own record with 88 shot blocks. By January 1991, and after only 42 games with the Wolverines, Andrew blocked her 112th career shot to become the leading shot-blocker in the history of the Michigan women's basketball program. Andrew credited her talent for blocks to "long arms", while Michigan head coach Bud VanDeWege noted: "She doesn't do it with great leaping ability -- many times she doesn't even leave the ground to block a shot -- so it's mostly the timing. It's a real gift to have."

As a junior during the 1991-92 season, Andrew again broke her own record with 136 blocks—a total that remains 62 more than any other player in the program's history. Her 136 blocks also stood as the Big Ten Conference record until 2007. Andrew also led the 1991-92 Wolverines with 522 points, a total that remains the sixth highest in program history, and 278 rebounds (9.9 per game). In December 1991, Andrew had her nose broken while making a rebound against the Bowling Green Falcons. On February 28, 1992, she scored a career-high 36 points with 16 field goals against Indiana.

As a senior during the 1992-93 season, Andrew established Michigan's single-season records with 311 rebounds and an average of 11.5 rebounds per game. She also led the team in points (514) and blocks (79). On December 28, 1992, she had a career-high 21 rebounds against Bucknell. Two days later, she had a career-high 10 shot blocks in a game against the Old Dominion Lady Monarchs. (She had four games in which she blocked nine shots.) At the end of the 1992-93 season, Andrew was selected as an Academic All-Big Ten Conference player.

Andrew remains Michigan's all-time career leader with 367 blocks. Her 368 blocks also stood as the Big Ten Conference record for 14 years until it was broken in 2007 by Jessica Davenport. Andrews also holds Michigan's single-season records with 311 rebounds during the 1992-93 season and 136 blocks during the 1991-92 season. In four years at Michigan, Andrew scored 1,647 points, which at the time was second only to Diane Dietz. She currently ranks as the third highest scorer in the program's history. Her career total of 701 field goals also ranks second highest in program history. Her 928 rebounds stood as the Michigan program record for 29 years until it was surpassed by Naz Hillmon in 2022.

== Career statistics ==
Career Michigan 113 6.2 13.4 .463 6.1 13.0 .468 0.1 0.4 .286 2.1 2.8 .740 8.2 0.8 1.2 3.2 14.6

Legend
GP	Games played	GS	Games started	MPG	Minutes per game	RPG	Rebounds per game
APG	Assists per game	SPG	Steals per game	BPG	Blocks per game	PPG	Points per game
TO	Turnovers per game	FG%	Field-goal percentage	3P%	3-point field-goal percentage	FT%	Free-throw percentage
**Bold**	Career best	°	League leader

=== College ===
Year	Team	GP	GS	MPG	FG%	3P%	FT%	RPG	APG	SPG	BPG	TO	PPG
1989–90	Michigan	**30**	-	-	**50.7**	0.0	52.6	4.7	0.5	0.7	2.1	-	7.9
1990–91	Michigan	28	-	-	47.3	0.0	76.5	7.1	0.8	1.1	3.1	-	13.3
1991–92	Michigan	28	-	-	48.6	**33.3**	71.6	9.9	0.9	1.4	**4.9**	-	18.6
1992–93	Michigan	27	-	-	41.3	29.2	**80.4**	**11.5**	**1.2**	**1.6**	2.9	-	**19.0**
**Career**		113	-	-	46.3	28.6	74.0	8.2	0.8	1.2	3.2	-	14.6
Statistics retrieved from Sports-Reference.

== Later years ==
After graduating from Michigan, Andrew played professional basketball in Greece. She retired from the Greek league after a contract dispute and returned to the Chicago area in 1995.
