= Mercy High School (Farmington Hills, Michigan) =

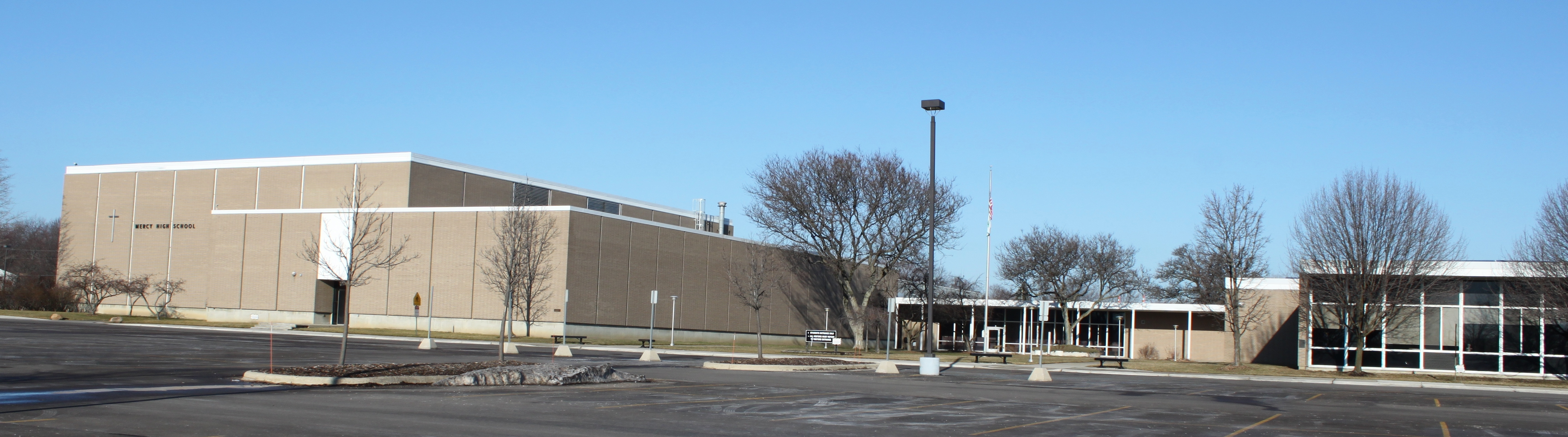
- Mercy High School

Location
- 29300 Eleven Mile Road; Farmington Hills, (Oakland County), Michigan 48336; United States
- Coordinates: 42°29′11″N 83°20′11.3″W

Information
- Type: Private, All-Girls
- Religious affiliations: Catholic, Sisters of Mercy
- Established: 1945
- Founder: Venerable Catherine McAuley
- President: Cheryl Delaney Kreger, Ed.D. '66
- Principal: Patricia Sattler
- Faculty: 85+
- Grades: 9–12
- Average class size: 170
- Campus size: 25 acres (100,000 m^{2})
- Colors: Maroon and Gold
- Athletics conference: Catholic High School League
- Mascot: Marlin
- Team name: Marlins
- Newspaper: Newsprint
- Yearbook: Lore
- Tuition: $14,100
- Dean of Students: Eleasha Mercer Tarplin ‘94
- Admissions: Jo Ferrari, Colleen Kogut, Maureen Duncan
- Athletic Director: Brandon Malinowski
- Website: https://www.mhsmi.org

Mercy High School is a sponsored ministry of the Institute of the Sisters of Mercy of the Americas and is a member of Mercy Education. Compelled by our Catholic faith and the spirit of the Sisters of Mercy, Mercy High School is a premier college preparatory school that educates and nurtures young women of diverse backgrounds to excel academically, serve compassionately, and lead courageously.

The Sisters of Mercy opened Our Lady of Mercy High School in Detroit in 1945. The school moved to Farmington Hills in 1965.

== Notable alumnae ==
- Diane Dietz, basketball player and chief marketing officer of Cranbrook Educational Community
- Heidi Ewing, documentary filmmaker
- Nicole Gibbons, interior designer and television personality
- Lauren Lake, talk show host
- Meg Mallon, professional golfer
- Mozella, singer/songwriter; co-writer of hit song "Wrecking Ball"
- Jess Mruzik, volleyball player
