= Anne Thorius =

Danish basketball player (born 1977)

Personal information
- Born: November 27, 1977 (age 47); Copenhagen, Denmark
- Listed height: 1.8 m (5 ft 11 in)

Career information
- College: Michigan (1997–2001)
- WNBA draft: 2001: 4th round, 58th overall pick
- Drafted by: Orlando Miracle
- Position: Point guard
- Stats at Basketball Reference

Anne Thorius (born November 27, 1977) is a Danish former basketball player. She played college basketball at the University of Michigan from 1997 to 2001 and holds the Michigan Wolverines women's basketball career record with 537 assists.

== University of Michigan ==
Thorius was born in Copenhagen in 1977. She grew up in Hørsholm, approximately 15 miles north of Copenhagen. She was recruited to play college basketball in the United States and enrolled at the University of Michigan in 1997. Thorius played at the guard position for the Michigan Wolverines women's basketball team from 1997 to 2001. She led the Wolverines in assists for four consecutive years, and her total of 537 assists is Michigan's all-time record. She twice totaled 145 assists in a season; the only Michigan player with more assists in a season is Vonnie Thompson. She was also the first Michigan women's basketball player to total 1,000 points and 500 assists. Thorius was a remarkably accurate free-throw shooter at Michigan. Her career free throw percentage of .831 (294 of 354) remains the second highest in Michigan History. She was selected as an Academic All-Big Ten Conference player in 2000 and 2001. She was also chosen by the coaches as a second-team All-Big Ten player in 1999 and 2000.

== Professional basketball ==
She was drafted by the Orlando Miracle in the fourth round (58th overall pick) of the 2001 WNBA draft, becoming the third Michigan player to be selected in a WNBA Draft. She was waived by the Miracle on May 27, 2001, right before the beginning of the season. Throughout Thorius' professional basketball career, she ended up never playing a single game in the WNBA.

She played professional basketball for the Polish Polypharma Gdynia team in 2001 and played in the Euroleague finals. In 2002, she signed a two-year contract to play for BF Copenhagen in Denmark. She played for Hørsholm in EuroBasket from 2005 to 2010. Thorius was also a three-time member of the Danish National Team.
