= Big Ten Conference Women's Basketball Defensive Player of the Year =

Basketball award

- Awarded for: the top women's basketball defensive player in the Big Ten Conference
- Country: United States

History
- First award: 2000
- Most recent: Lauren Betts, UCLA

The Big Ten Conference Women's Basketball Defensive Player of the Year is an annual college basketball award presented to the top women's basketball defensive player in the Big Ten Conference.

== Key ==
†	Co-Player of the Year
C	Coaches selection
M	Media selection

== Winners ==
Season	Player	School	Source(s)
1999–2000	Stacey Thomas	Michigan	
2000–01	Tamara Moore	Wisconsin	
2001–02	Kelly Komara	Purdue	
2002–03	Tanisha Wright	Penn State	
2003–04	Tanisha Wright (2)	Penn State	
2004–05	Tanisha Wright (3)	Penn State	
2005–06	Kim Wilburn	Ohio State	
2006–07	Lindsay Wisdom-Hylton	Purdue	
2007–08	Shavelle Little	Ohio State	
2008–09	Shavelle Little (2)	Ohio State	
2009–10	Allyssa DeHaan	Michigan State	
2010–11	Lykendra Johnson	Michigan State	
2011–12	Amber Stokes	Ohio State	
2012–13	Adrienne GodBold	Illinois	
2013–14	Dara Taylor	Penn State	
2014–15	Syessence Davis	Rutgers	
2015–16	Ashley Deary	Northwestern	
2016–17	Ashley Deary (2)	Northwestern	
2017–18	Ae'Rianna Harris	Purdue	
2018–19	Ae'Rianna Harris (2)	Purdue	
2019–20	Veronica Burton	Northwestern	
2020–21	Veronica Burton (2)	Northwestern	
2021–22	Veronica Burton (3)	Northwestern	
2022–23	Mackenzie Holmes	Indiana	
2023–24	Celeste Taylor ^{C}	Ohio State	
2023–24	Serah Williams ^{M}	Wisconsin	
2024–25	Lauren Betts	UCLA	
2025–26	Lauren Betts (2)	UCLA	

== Winners by school ==
School (year joined)	Winners	Years
Northwestern	5	2016, 2017, 2020, 2021, 2022
Ohio State	5	2006, 2008, 2009, 2012, 2024
Penn State (1992)	4	2003, 2004, 2005, 2014
Purdue	4	2002, 2007, 2018. 2019
Michigan State	2	2010, 2011
UCLA (2024)	2	2025, 2026
Wisconsin	2	2001, 2024
Illinois	1	2013
Indiana	1	2023
Michigan	1	2000
Rutgers (2014)	1	2015
Iowa	0	—
Maryland (2014)	0	—
Minnesota	0	—
Nebraska (2011)	0	—
Oregon (2024)	0	—
USC (2024)	0	—
Washington (2024)	0	—
