= Kim Barnes Arico =

American basketball coach (born 1970)

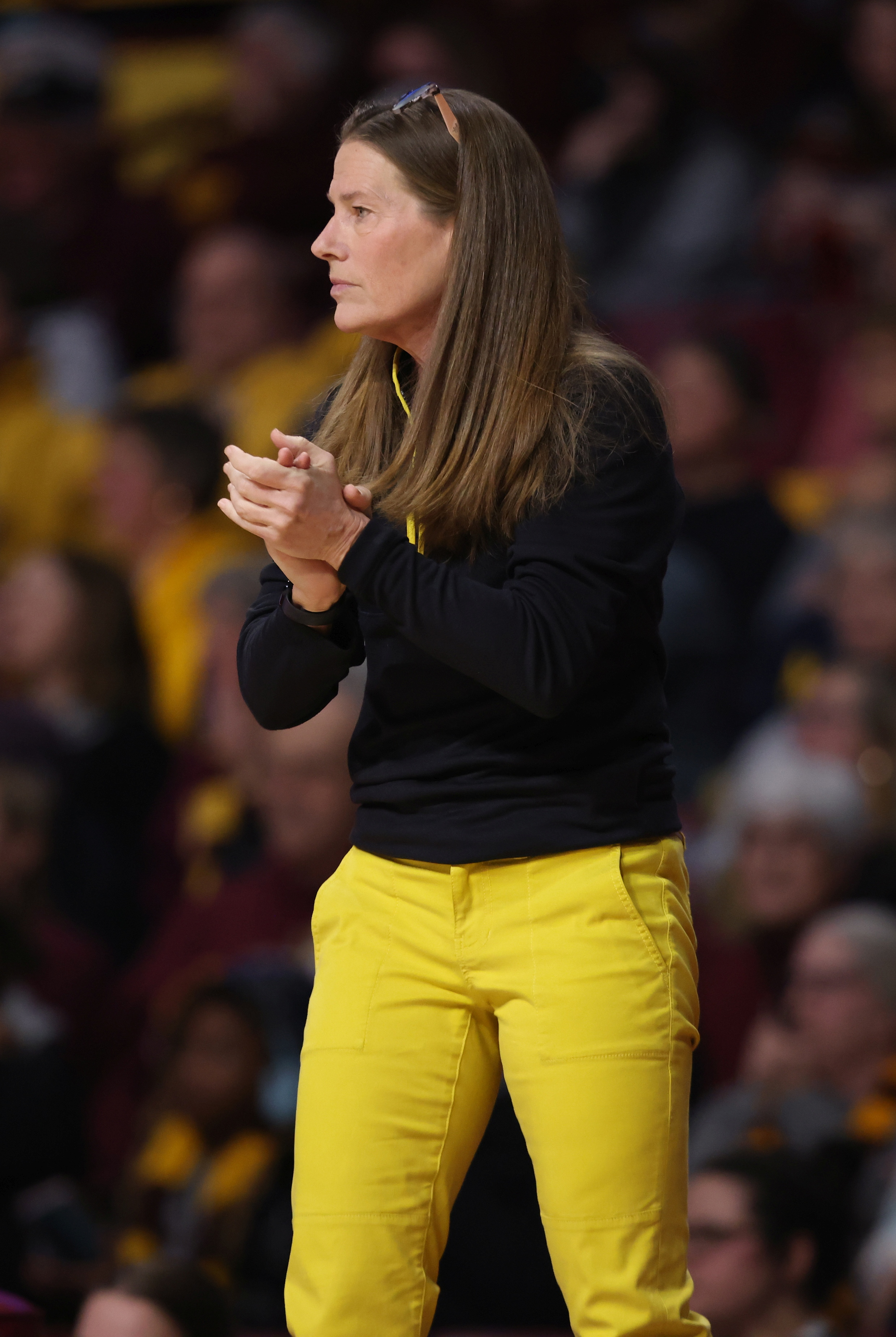
- Barnes Arico with the Michigan Wolverines in 2025

Current position
- Title: Head coach
- Team: Michigan
- Conference: Big Ten
- Record: 312–151 (.674)

Biographical details
- Born: August 9, 1970 (age 56); Mastic Beach, New York, U.S.
- Education: Montclair State University (1993)

Playing career
- 1988–1989: Stony Brook
- 1990–1993: Montclair State

Coaching career (HC unless noted)
- 1996–1997: Fairleigh Dickinson–Madison
- 1997–1999: NJIT
- 1999–2002: Adelphi
- 2002–2012: St. John's
- 2012–present: Michigan

Head coaching record
- Overall: 582–357 (.620) (NCAA); 488–285 (.631) (NCAA Division I)
- Tournaments: 18–13 (NCAA Division I); 1–1 (NCAA Division II)

Accomplishments and honors

Championships
- Women's National Invitation Tournament (2017); New York Collegiate Athletic Conference regular season and tournament (2002)

Awards
- 2× Big Ten Coach of the Year (2017, 2022); 2× Big East Coach of the Year (2006, 2012); 2× NYCAC Coach of the Year (2000, 2002); 2× MBWA D-I Coach of the Year (2006, 2010); MBWA D-II Coach of the Year (2002)

Records
- Michigan career wins: 312; Michigan single-season wins: 28; Adelphi single-season wins: 28

Kimberly Ann Barnes Arico (born August 9, 1970) is an American college basketball coach, currently the Wolverines women's basketball head coach at the University of Michigan. She was hired in 2012 and is the all-time winningest coach in program history. Barnes Arico was previously the head coach at St. John's University from 2002 to 2012. She has been the Met Basketball Writers Association (MBWA) coach of the year three times, as the best coach in the New York metropolitan area, and a conference coach of the year six times.

== Early life ==
Barnes Arico was born on August 9, 1970 in Mastic Beach, New York, and attended William Floyd High School in Long Island. She played college basketball played at Stony Brook University as a freshman, helping lead the team to the 1989 NCAA D-III tournament. She then transferred and spent her final three seasons at Montclair State University, where she was the team’s leading scorer during her final two seasons. She graduated in 1993 with a degree in Physical Education and Health, and was a high school teacher in New Jersey at the Academy of St. Aloysius and Chatham High School from 1993 until 1996.

== Coaching career ==
=== Division II & III ===
In 1996, Barnes Arico became the head coach at the Fairleigh Dickinson University campus in Madison, New Jersey, competing in Division III. In 1997, she was named the head coach at the New Jersey Institute of Technology in Newark, transitioning the program from Division III to II. In 1999, she was named the head coach at Adelphi University in Garden City, New York at the Division II level, where she remained until 2002. In her final season, she won the NYCAC regular season and NYCAC tournament against Dowling College. Barnes Arico was awarded the MBWA D-II Coach of the Year, set a program-record for single-season wins, 28, and advanced to the 2002 NCAA D-II Sweet Sixteen.

=== St. John's ===
On May 7, 2002, Barnes Arico was named the head coach at St. John's University for the Red Storm. She was named the seventh head coach in the then 28-year history of the women's basketball program. She led the Red Storm to their first ever Sweet Sixteen appearance in the 2012 NCAA tournament and held the record for the all-time wins until her successor, Joe Tartamella, surpassed her in 2022. She was the Big East Coach of the Year in 2006 and 2012.

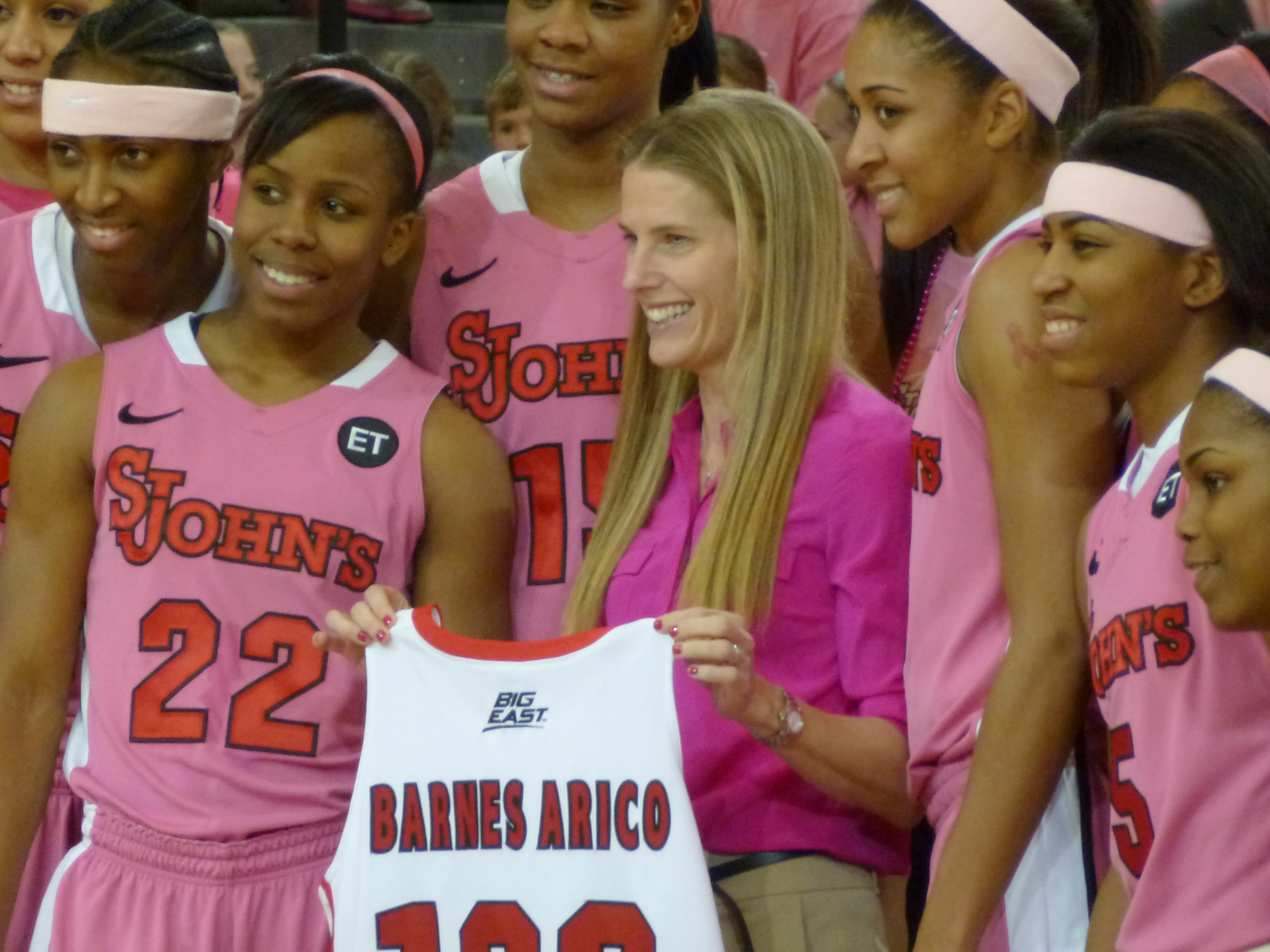
Barnes Arico after her school-record 169th win with the St. John's Red Storm in February 2012

=== Michigan ===
On April 20, 2012, Barnes Arico was named the ninth head basketball coach at the University of Michigan for the Wolverines. During the 2017–18 season, she became the winningest coach in program history. Through 11 years as head coach, she led Michigan to ten 20-win seasons, with the only exception being the 2020 season impacted by COVID-19. On July 12, 2018, Barnes Arico signed a contract extension with the Wolverines through the 2022–23 season. On September 10, 2021, Barnes Arico signed a contract extension with the Wolverines through the 2025–26 season. On December 28, 2022, Barnes Arico won her 500th career game with a victory over Nebraska.

On November 7, 2023, the University of Michigan Athletic Director, Warde Manuel, announced a contract extension through the 2027–28 basketball season, with an automatic one-year extension added each June. On December 16, 2023, Barnes Arico won her 250th game at Michigan with a victory over Miami (Ohio).

On February 12, 2025, Barnes Arico led the Michigan Wolverines to a 70-67 victory over Indiana, securing her 279th victory at Ann Arbor, Michigan. Already the women's all-time leader in wins, she gained a place in Michigan's record book as the all-time winningest basketball coach, passing the men's all-time leader, John Beilein. Barnes Arico has led Michigan to nine NCAA tournament appearances, and advanced to the second round eight times, including a Sweet Sixteen appearance in 2021 and Elite Eight appearances in 2022 and 2026.

== Personal life ==
Kim Barnes Arico is married to Larry Arico, and has three children: Trevor, Emma and Cecelia. They lived in Glen Rock, New Jersey, when she was the head coach at St. John's. Emma Arico joined the Michigan Wolverines women's lacrosse team in 2024, Trevor Arico started a graduate assistant coaching role under Dusty May with the 2025–26 Michigan Wolverines men's basketball team, and Cece Arico committed to play basketball for her mother's Michigan Wolverines as a five-star recruit in the class of 2027.

Barnes Arico was inducted into the William Floyd High School Athletic Hall of Fame in 2007, Adelphi University Athletic Hall of Fame in 2014 and the Suffolk Sports Hall of Fame in 2020.

== Head coaching record ==
Record table
Season	Team	Overall	Conference	Standing	Postseason
Fairleigh Dickinson–Madison Devils (MAC Freedom Conference) (1996–1997)
1996–97	FD–Madison	13–11	5–7		
FD-Madison:		13–11 (.542)	5–7 (.417)		
NJIT Highlanders (Independent) (1997–1999)
1997–98	NJIT	5–21	3–17		
1998–99	NJIT	11–16	9–12		
NJIT:		16–37 (.302)	12–29 (.293)		
Adelphi Panthers (New York Collegiate Athletic Conference) (1999–2002)
1999–00	Adelphi	18–10	16–6		
2000–01	Adelphi	19–11	16–6		
2001–02	Adelphi	28–3	20–2		NCAA D-II Sweet Sixteen
Adelphi:		65–24 (.730)	52–14 (.788)		
St. John's Red Storm (Big East Conference) (2002–2011)
2002–03	St. John's	8–19	2–14	14th	
2003–04	St. John's	10–18	4–12	11th	
2004–05	St. John's	20–11	7–9	T–6th	WNIT Second Round
2005–06	St. John's	22–8	11–5	T–3rd	NCAA Second Round
2006–07	St. John's	8–20	4–12	12th	
2007–08	St. John's	18–15	7–9	10th	WNIT Quarterfinals
2008–09	St. John's	19–15	4–12	T–13th	WNIT Third Round
2009–10	St. John's	24–6	12–4	4th	NCAA Second Round
2010–11	St. John's	22–11	9–7	T–8th	NCAA Second Round
2011–12	St. John's	24–10	13–3	T–2nd	NCAA Sweet Sixteen
St. John's:		176–134 (.568)	83–87 (.488)		
Michigan Wolverines (Big Ten Conference) (2012–present)
2012–13	Michigan	22–11	9–7	T–5th	NCAA Second Round
2013–14	Michigan	20–14	8–8	7th	WNIT Third Round
2014–15	Michigan	20–15	8–10	8th	WNIT Semifinals
2015–16	Michigan	21–14	9–9	T-7th	WNIT Semifinals
2016–17	Michigan	28–9	11–5	3rd	WNIT Champion
2017–18	Michigan	23–10	10–6	6th	NCAA Second Round
2018–19	Michigan	22–12	11–7	4th	NCAA Second Round
2019–20	Michigan	21–11	10–8	7th	Cancelled due to COVID-19
2020–21	Michigan	16–6	9–4	4th	NCAA Sweet Sixteen
2021–22	Michigan	25–7	13–4	T–3rd	NCAA Elite Eight
2022–23	Michigan	23–10	11–7	T–5th	NCAA Second Round
2023–24	Michigan	20–14	9–9	T–6th	NCAA First Round
2024–25	Michigan	23–11	11–7	T–5th	NCAA Second Round
2025–26	Michigan	28–7	15–3	T–2nd	NCAA Elite Eight
Michigan:		312–151 (.674)	144–94 (.605)		
Total:		582–357 (.620)			
National champion Postseason invitational champion Conference regular season champion Conference regular season and conference tournament champion Division regular season champion Division regular season and conference tournament champion Conference tournament champion
