= Mila Holloway =

Canadian basketball player (born 2006)

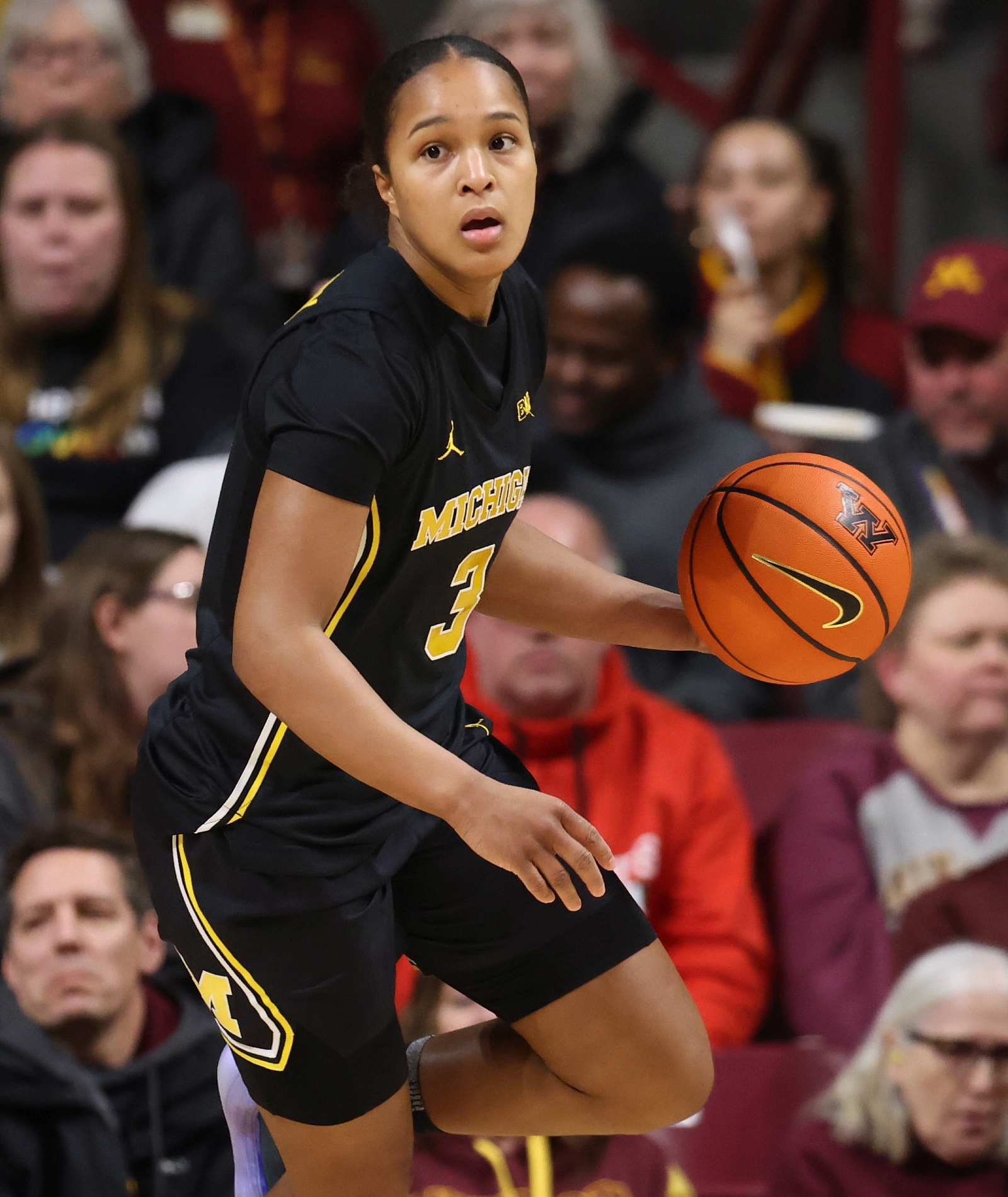
- Holloway with the Michigan Wolverines in 2025

No. 3 – Michigan Wolverines
- Position: Guard
- League: Big Ten Conference

Personal information
- Born: May 23, 2006 (age 20) Charlotte, North Carolina, U.S.
- Listed height: 5 ft 10 in (1.78 m)

Career information
- High school: Julius L. Chambers (Charlotte, North Carolina); Legacy Early College (Greenville, South Carolina)
- College: Michigan (2024–present)

Mela Lyn "Mila" Holloway (born May 23, 2006) is an American-Canadian college basketball player for the Michigan Wolverines of the Big Ten Conference.

== Early life and high school career ==
Holloway first attended Julius L. Chambers High School in Charlotte, North Carolina. During her sophomore year, she averaged 13.6 points, 3.4 steals, 2.6 rebounds and 2.4 assists per game, helping lead the Cougars to their third consecutive state championship. She then attended Legacy Early College in Greenville, South Carolina. During her junior year, she averaged 11.3 points, 6.1 rebounds, 3.9 assists and 2.5 steals per game. As a senior, she averaged 16.0 points, 4.6 rebounds and 3.0 assists per game. On November 8, 2023, Holloway signed her National Letter of Intent to play college basketball at the University of Michigan.

== College career ==
=== Freshman season ===
On November 4, 2024, Holloway made her collegiate debut for Michigan and recorded two points, four rebounds and four assists in 32 minutes, in a 62–68 loss to AP No. 1 South Carolina. On November 14, 2024, in a game against Central Michigan, she recorded a career-high 21 points, along with two rebounds, eight assists and five steals. On November 17, 2024, in a game against Oakland, she recorded her second consecutive double-figure scoring game with 16 points, three rebounds, two assists and a steal. She was subsequently named the Big Ten Freshman of the Week for the week ending November 18, 2024. On January 11, 2025, in a game against Purdue, she scored a career-high tying 21 points, along with three rebounds, three assists and four steals.

During her freshman season she started all 34 games, and averaged 9.8 points, 3.1 rebounds and 4.4 assists in 29 minutes per game. She scored in double figures in 13 games and was named an All-Big Ten honorable mention by the media. She recorded three 20-point games and 14 games with at least five assists. She set the Michigan freshman record for assists in a season with 148, surpassing the previous record of 147 set by Vonnie Thompson in 1987.

=== Sophomore season ===
On February 1, 2026, Holloway scored a career-high 26 points in their rivalry game against Michigan State. During her sophomore season, she started all 29 games, and averaged 12.6 points, 3.9 rebounds and 4.6 assists per game. She scored in double-figures 19 times, and had at least five assists in 15 games. Following the season she was named an honorable mention All-Big Ten selection.

=== Junior season ===
On September 8, 2026, it was announced Holloway injured her lower left leg at practice and would be out indefinitely.

== National team career ==
On July 9, 2025, Holloway was selected to the Canadian national team for the 2025 FIBA Under-19 Women's Basketball World Cup, along with her Michigan teammate, Syla Swords. During the tournament, she averaged 6.3 points, 2.0 rebounds and 4.7 assists per game and Canada finished in fourth place. Her 4.7 assists per game ranked fifth in the tournament.

== Personal life ==
Holloway has dual citizenship in Canada through her mother, Robin Raimey, who was born in Calgary. Her maternal grandfather, Dave Raimey, played for the Michigan Wolverines football program, and briefly in the National Football League (NFL) for the Cleveland Browns, before playing in the Canadian Football League (CFL). She has two older brothers, Leito and Aden Holloway. Aden played college basketball for the Auburn Tigers and Alabama Crimson Tide.

== Career statistics ==
Legend
GP	Games played	GS	Games started	MPG	Minutes per game	RPG	Rebounds per game
APG	Assists per game	SPG	Steals per game	BPG	Blocks per game	PPG	Points per game
TO	Turnovers per game	FG%	Field-goal percentage	3P%	3-point field-goal percentage	FT%	Free-throw percentage
**Bold**	Career best	°	League leader

=== College ===
Year	Team	GP	GS	MPG	FG%	3P%	FT%	RPG	APG	SPG	BPG	TO	PPG
2024–25	Michigan	34	34	29.0	.401	.384	.772	3.1	4.4	1.4	0.1	2.9	9.8
2025–26	Michigan	35	35	28.8	.431	.344	.778	4.1	4.8	1.5	0.2	2.8	12.3
**Career**		**69**	**69**	**28.9**	**.418**	**.359**	**.775**	**3.6**	**4.6**	**1.4**	**0.2**	**2.9**	**11.1**
