= DeWitt Public Schools =

School district in Michigan

Address
- PO Box 800 DeWitt, Clinton, Michigan, 48820; United States

District information
- Grades: Pre-Kindergarten-12
- Superintendent: Kevin Robydek
- Schools: 5
- Budget: $48,637,000 2022-2023 expenditures
- NCES District ID: 2611550

Students and staff
- Students: 3,109 (2024-2025)
- Teachers: 177.25 (on an FTE basis) (2024-2025)
- Staff: 346.32 FTE (2024-2025)
- Student–teacher ratio: 17.54 (2024-2025)

Other information
- Website: www.dewittschools.net

DeWitt Public Schools is a public school district in Clinton County, Michigan. It serves DeWitt and parts of DeWitt Township and Watertown Township. DeWitt Public Schools' mascot is the Panther and the school colors are Blue and Gold. Four of the district's six schools share a campus south of West Herbison Road between Shavey Road and DeWitt Road.

== History ==
In 1836, the first school in DeWitt was established. A two-story brick school was built in the 1870s. Eleventh grade was added to the district in 1937, and twelfth grade in 1938, and the high school's first class graduated in 1939. A new school, containing all grades, was built in 1937 after the old one burned.

A new high school opened in February 1966. In 1970, Herbison Woods Elementary was built as the middle school. When the current high school was built in 1999, the former high school became the middle school.

== Schools ==
Schools in DeWitt Public Schools district
School	Address	Notes
Fuerstenau Early Childhood Center	205 W. Washington St., DeWitt	Preschool
Schavey Road Elementary	1721 Schavey Rd., DeWitt	Grades PreK-1. Built 1988.
David Scott Elementary School	804 Wilson St., DeWitt	Grades 2-3. Built 1957.
Herbison Woods School	3147 W. Herbison Rd., DeWitt	Grades 4-5. Built 1970.
DeWitt Middle School	2957 W. Herbison Rd., DeWitt	Grades 6-8. Built 1966.
DeWitt High School	13601 Panther Drive, DeWitt	Grades 9-12. Built 1999.
