= Nicole Gibbons =

American interior designer and television personality

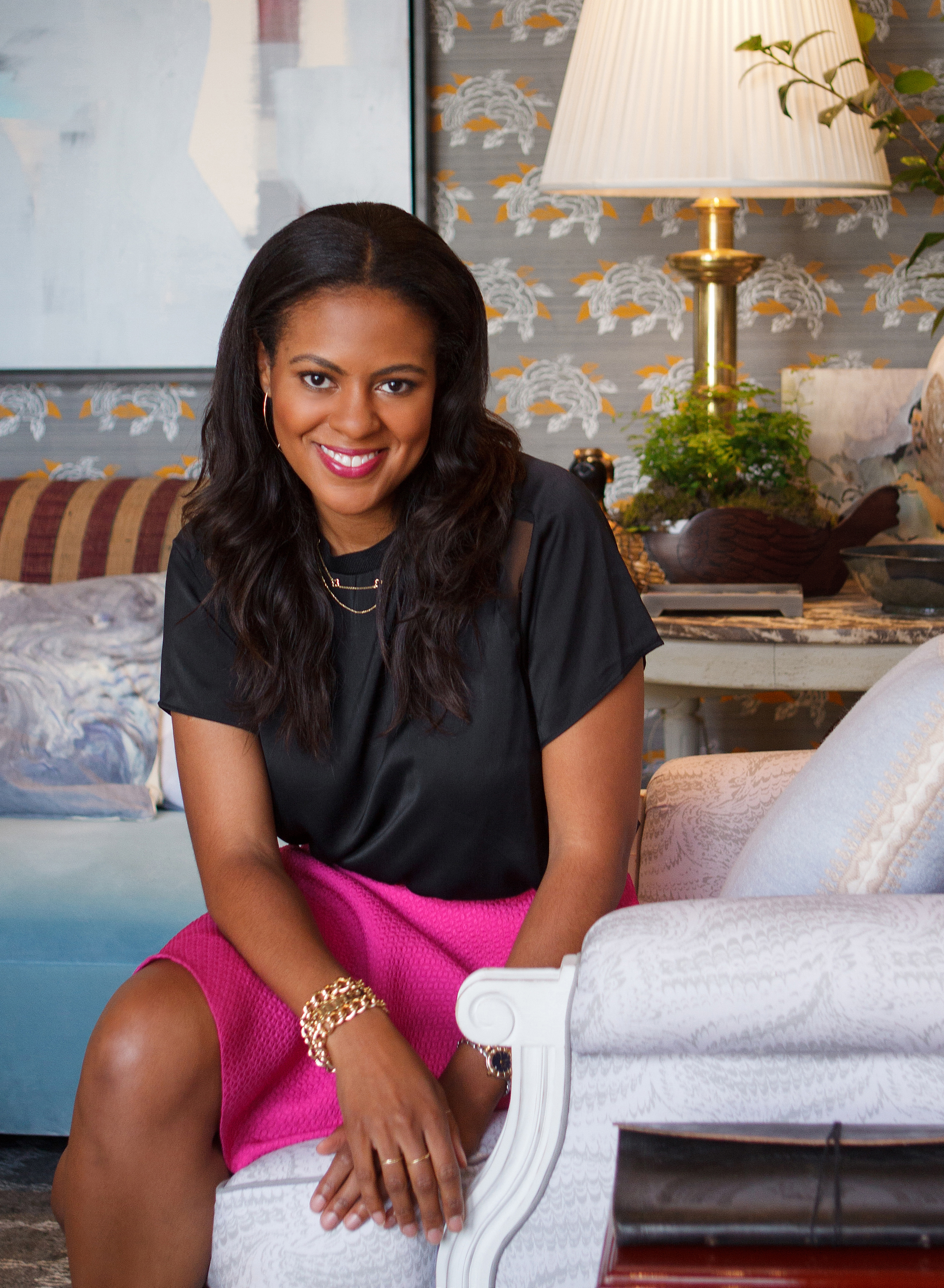
- Gibbons in 2013
- Born: August 10, 1981 (age 44); Detroit, Michigan, U.S.
- Education: Northwestern University (BS)
- Occupations: Interior designer, blogger, TV personality
- Years active: 2008–present
- Website: www.nicolegibbons.com

Nicole Gibbons (born August 10, 1981) is an American interior designer, television personality, and design blogger. She is best known as the founder of the decorating and lifestyle blog So Haute, and for her frequent television appearances. She currently appears as a design expert on Home Made Simple, a home improvement reality show on the Oprah Winfrey Network. She is also the founder of Nicole Gibbons Studio, LLC, which specializes in high-end residential and commercial interior design. She splits her time between New York and Los Angeles, California.

Gibbons describes her design aesthetic as "classic sophistication with a fresh, modern edge".

== Early life and career ==
Gibbons was born in Detroit, Michigan, to William and Sondra Gibbons. She was raised in Southfield, Michigan, and attended nearby Mercy High School. Her mother worked as an interior designer, and her father was an entrepreneur. Gibbons credits her parents' influence as the foundation for her current success.

Gibbons attended Northwestern University in Evanston, Illinois and graduated with a Bachelor of Science degree in Communication Studies in 2003. She initially pursued a career in public relations and served for several years as the director of PR and events for Victoria's Secret.

== Design career ==
=== Early design career ===
Although she never intended to pursue a career as a designer, Gibbons always maintained an interest in interior design. In January 2008, she launched her decorating and lifestyle blog, So Haute. So Haute serves as a "guide to stylish living" and shares design news, shopping resources, inspirational interiors, and decorating tips and ideas with its readers. In June 2008 Nicole established Nicole Gibbons Interiors, LLC, as a part-time design business focusing on small scale decorating projects in Manhattan.

=== Nicole Gibbons Studio ===
In early 2013, Gibbons re-launched her design firm as a full-time venture, renaming it Nicole Gibbons Studio. The firm has two branches: one specializes in full service design for residential and commercial clients, and the other focuses on Gibbons' branded partnerships and on-air work as a design expert in television and digital media.

=== Television appearances and other projects ===
In 2013, Gibbons joined the cast of the third season of Home Made Simple, a reality TV show hosted by the Oprah Winfrey Network, where she appears as a design expert. The show brings home improvement experts to help families redecorate a space in their home via cost-saving do-it-yourself techniques. Gibbons is also an online contributor for Domino, a lifestyle magazine. She has been featured in multiple television, print and online publications, including HGTV, House Beautiful, TLC, InStyle, Real Simple, Better Homes & Gardens, The Nest, and Elle Décor. She has also collaborated with home and lifestyle brands including Target, One Kings Lane, and Pier 1 Imports.
