= Stacey Thomas =

American basketball player (born 1978)

Personal information
- Born: August 29, 1978 (age 47); Flint, Michigan, U.S.
- Listed height: 5 ft 10 in (1.78 m)

Career information
- High school: Flint Southwestern Academy (Flint, Michigan)
- College: Michigan (1996–2000)
- WNBA draft: 2000: 2nd round, 23rd overall pick
- Drafted by: Portland Fire
- Position: Forward

Career history
- 2000–2002: Portland Fire
- 2003: Phoenix Mercury
- 2003–2005: Detroit Shock
- 2005: Minnesota Lynx

Career highlights
- WNBA champion (2003); Big Ten Defensive Player of the Year (2000); First-team All-Big Ten (2000); Big Ten Freshman of the Year (1997)
- Stats at Basketball Reference

Stacey Thomas (born August 29, 1978) is an American former professional basketball player who played as a forward.

== Career ==
Thomas attended college at University of Michigan and graduated in 2000. She was named the Big Ten Freshman of the Year in 1997 and Big Ten Defensive Player of the Year in 2000. Following her collegiate career, she was selected 23rd overall in the 2000 WNBA draft by the Portland Fire. She also played for the Phoenix Mercury, Detroit Shock, and Minnesota Lynx.

Thomas signed with the Seattle Storm on April 29, 2003 but was waived on May 20, 2003. She also signed with the Charlotte Sting on April 12, 2006 but was waived on May 16, 2006.

== Career statistics ==
Legend
GP	Games played	GS	Games started	MPG	Minutes per game	RPG	Rebounds per game
APG	Assists per game	SPG	Steals per game	BPG	Blocks per game	PPG	Points per game
TO	Turnovers per game	FG%	Field-goal percentage	3P%	3-point field-goal percentage	FT%	Free-throw percentage
**Bold**	Career best	°	League leader

=== WNBA ===
==== Regular season ====
Year	Team	GP	GS	MPG	FG%	3P%	FT%	RPG	APG	SPG	BPG	TO	PPG
2000	Portland	**32**	**31**	**27.0**	.356	.250	.595	**3.9**	**3.2**	**1.7**	**0.5**	2.1	**5.1**
2001	Portland	**32**	1	12.9	**.367**	.000	.429	2.2	1.3	0.9	0.3	1.3	1.8
2002	Portland	**32**	6	19.4	.345	.256	.508	2.9	2.1	1.3	0.4	1.1	4.5
2003	Phoenix	19	1	9.8	.326	**.273**	**.625**	1.4	0.5	0.6	0.4	0.6	2.4
2003	Detroit	11	0	7.5	.313	.200	.364	1.5	0.5	0.8	0.1	0.5	1.4
2004	Detroit	1	0	1.0	.000	.000	.000	0.0	0.0	0.0	0.0	0.0	0.0
2005	Detroit	17	0	7.8	.167	.000	.400	1.2	0.5	0.5	0.2	0.2	0.7
2005	Minnesota	1	0	3.0	.000	.000	.000	2.0	0.0	0.0	0.0	0.0	0.0
Career	6 years, 4 teams	145	39	15.9	.342	.233	.516	2.4	1.6	1.1	0.3	1.1	3.0

==== Playoffs ====
Year	Team	GP	GS	MPG	FG%	3P%	FT%	RPG	APG	SPG	BPG	TO	PPG
2003	Detroit	**4**	0	**3.3**	.000	.000	.000	**0.8**	0.0	**0.3**	0.0	0.3	0.0
2004	Detroit	3	0	2.3	**1.000**	**1.000**	.000	0.3	0.0	0.3	0.0	0.0	**1.0**
Career	2 years, 1 team	7	0	2.9	.500	1.000	.000	0.6	0.0	0.3	0.0	0.1	0.4

=== College ===
Year	Team	GP	GS	MPG	FG%	3P%	FT%	RPG	APG	SPG	BPG	TO	PPG
1996–97	Michigan	26	-	-	**50.9**	16.7	51.9	6.6	1.9	2.7	0.5	-	12.9
1997–98	Michigan	29	-	-	43.2	17.4	59.5	7.3	1.8	3.1	0.6	-	11.7
1998–99	Michigan	**30**	-	-	44.9	**32.1**	**62.1**	**7.8**	1.9	**3.7**	**0.9**	-	**14.9**
1999–00	Michigan	**30**	-	-	38.1	27.6	59.2	7.7	**2.1**	3.4	0.7	-	14.5
**Career**		115	-	-	43.7	26.3	58.2	7.4	1.9	3.2	0.7	-	13.5
Statistics retrieved from Sports-Reference.
