= Katelynn Flaherty =

American basketball player

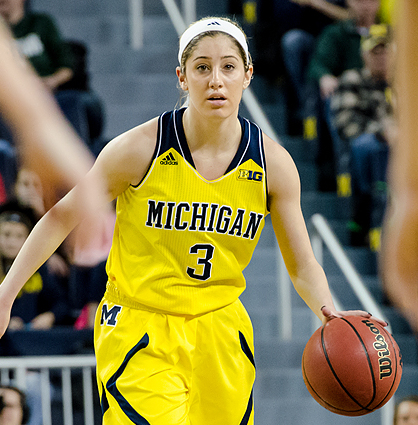

Personal information
- Born: February 15, 1996 (age 30) Point Pleasant Beach, New Jersey
- Listed height: 5 ft 7 in (1.70 m)
- Listed weight: 140 lb (64 kg)

Career information
- High school: Metuchen High School (Metuchen, New Jersey)
- College: Michigan (2014–2018)
- Position: Point guard

Career highlights
- 3× First-team All-Big Ten (2016–2018); Big Ten Sixth Player of the Year (2015); Big Ten All-Freshman Team (2015)

Katelynn Christine Flaherty (born February 15, 1996) is an American former basketball player. She played college basketball for the Michigan Wolverines, where she is Michigan's all-time leading scorer in points, man or woman, with 2,776 career points, field goals made, three-point field goals made, double-figure scoring games and 30-point games.

== Playing career ==
=== High school ===
Flaherty began her basketball career at Manasquan High School. As a freshman at Manasquan, she scored 579 points for an average of 22.3 points per game. As a sophomore at Manasquan, she scored 673 points and averaged 21 points per game and helped lead her team to a No. 1 ranking in the state, a 32–2 record and the Tournament of Champions championship, a tournament between the winners of each high school division in New Jersey. She recorded a game-high 27 points in the final and was subsequently named the tournament final's MVP.

During the summer of 2012, she transferred to Point Pleasant Beach High School. As a junior, she scored 860 points, averaging 30.7 points, 5.8 assists, 4.1 rebounds and 3.5 steals per game, to help lead Point Pleasant Beach to a 26–2 record and the New Jersey Group 1 state championship, their first in school history. Following the season she was named first team All-State, first team All-Shore, All-New Jersey first team by MSG and All-Metro first team. She scored 2,075 career points in her first three seasons, becoming the first Shore Conference player ever to surpass the 2,000 career point mark as a junior. For her senior year she then transferred to Metuchen High School where her father and uncle played. She suffered a Lisfranc injury early in the season, that prematurely ended her high school playing career.

=== College ===
During the 2014–15 season in her freshman year, Flaherty appeared in all 35 games for the Wolverines, including eight starts, averaging 14.3 points per game to lead Michigan in scoring. She became the sixth freshman in school history to lead a team in scoring, and also was the conference's third-leading freshman scorer. She set a new freshman record with 78 three-pointers. Following the season she was named to the All-Freshman team and was named Sixth Player of the Year, becoming the first Michigan player to earn the honor.

During the 2015–16 season in her sophomore year, Flaherty started all 35 games, scoring in double figures in 34 games, and set a program record for points scored (774) and points per game (22.3). She ranked eighth nationally and third in the Big Ten in scoring average at 22.3 points per game. She became the second sophomore in school history to surpass 1,000 points when she scored a then career-high 36 points against Illinois on February 7, 2016. Following the season she was named a unanimous All-Big Ten first team selection by both the coaches and the media, becoming just the fourth Wolverine in school history to earn a spot on the first team.

During the 2016–17 season in her junior year, she averaged a team-high 20.2 points and 3.0 assists in 33.9 minutes per game. She scored in double figures in 34 games, recording 20 20-point games and three 30-point games. On January 7, 2017, she scored a career-high 38 points and set a then program-record with eight three-pointers in a game against Ohio State. Following the season she was named a unanimous All-Big Ten first team selection by both the coaches and the media for the second consecutive year. During the 2017 Women's National Invitation Tournament against Georgia Tech, she recorded 27 points, including two three-pointers in the final 1:06 of regulation to force overtime, helping Michigan win the Women's National Invitation Tournament, their first postseason championship in program history, and was subsequently named tournament MVP.

During the 2017–18 season in her senior year, Flaherty started all 33 games, averaging 22.9 points per game, the fifth highest average in the country, 2.8 rebounds and 4.2 assists in 36.8 minutes per game. She scored in double figures in all but one game, recording 25 20-point games and three 30-point games. On November 16, 2017, Flaherty recorded 23 points in a game against Louisville, to become Michigan women's basketball program's leading scorer, surpassing the previous record of 2,076 points set by Diane Dietz in 1982. On December 28, 2017, she recorded a new program-record 10 three-pointers against Penn State, finishing the game with 33 points. On January 13, 2018, she recorded 26 points in a game against Nebraska, to become Michigan's all-time leading scorer, man or woman, surpassing Glen Rice's school record of 2,442 points. On January 20, 2018, she recorded 27 points in a game against Illinois, to become the seventh Big Ten women's basketball player to score 2,500 career points. Flaherty finished the season with 118 three-pointers, setting a new single-season program record. She helped Michigan advance to the NCAA Division I women's basketball tournament for the first time since 2013. Following an outstanding season, she was named a finalist for the Nancy Lieberman Award and University of Michigan Female Athlete of the Year. She was also named a unanimous All-Big Ten first team selection by both the coaches and the media, marking her third consecutive season with consensus first team honors. She was named to the WBCA All-Region team and WBCA All-America honorable mention for the third consecutive year. She also earned All-America honorable mention by the Associated Press, becoming the first Wolverine to earn AP mention. Flaherty became the first three-time all-region honoree in program history.

Flaherty finished her career at Michigan as the all-time leading point-scorer in Michigan basketball history, man or woman, with 2,776 career-points, field goals made (984), three-point field goals made (410), double-figure scoring games (127) and 30-point games (13). She was the second woman in NCAA history to surpass 400 career three-point shots made, following Kelsey Mitchell, finishing with 410 three-pointers.

=== Michigan statistics ===
Legend
GP	Games played	GS	Games started	MPG	Minutes per game
FG%	Field goal percentage	3P%	3-point field goal percentage	FT%	Free throw percentage
RPG	Rebounds per game	APG	Assists per game	SPG	Steals per game
BPG	Blocks per game	PPG	Points per game	**Bold**	Career high

Year	Team	GP	Points	FG%	3P%	FT%	RPG	APG	SPG	BPG	PPG
2014–15	Michigan	35	499	41.6%	37.5%	**91.1%**	1.3	1.9	0.7	0.1	14.3
2015–16	Michigan	35	**774**	**44.9%**	40.2%	86.5%	2.0	2.4	1.1	0.1	22.1
2016–17	Michigan	**37**	746	42.7%	36.7%	85.8%	1.9	3.0	1.1	**0.2**	20.2
2017–18	Michigan	33	757	44.3%	**42.3%**	89.6%	**2.8**	**4.2**	**1.2**	0.0	**22.9**
Career		140	2776	43.5%	39.2%	87.9%	2.0	2.9	1.0	0.1	19.8

== See also ==
- Michigan Wolverines women's basketball statistical leaders
