= Stephany Skrba =

Canadian basketball player

Personal information
- Born: April 13, 1987 (age 39) Etobicoke, Ontario
- Listed height: 1.88 m (6 ft 2 in)

Career information
- High school: Langstaff Secondary School (200?-2005)
- College: Michigan Wolverines (2005–2009)
- WNBA draft: 2009: undrafted
- Playing career: 2009–present
- Position: Power forward

Career history
- 2009–2010: ŁKS Łódź
- 2010–2011: Aris Thessaloniki
- 2011–2012: Lattes-Montpellier
- 2012–2013: CJM Bourges Basket
- 2015–2016: Arras
- 2016–2017: Proteas Voulas
- 2018–2019: UFAB49 Angers
- 2019–2022: SIG
Medals
Women's basketball
Representing Canada
Americas U18 Championship
Bronze medal – third place	2004 Puerto Rico	Team

Stephany Eliza Pierrette Skrba, or shortly Stephany Skrba, (born April 13, 1987) is a Canadian female professional basketball player of Serbian descent. She plays on the power forward position. As an active professional basketball player for over a decade, Stephany is a LFB 1st League French Champion, 2x LFB 1st League Finalist and EuroLeague Bronze Medalist. She has played in some of the top basketball leagues in the world; EuroLeague and EuroCup, representing teams from France, Spain, Italy, Greece, and Poland. She also represented her home country of Canada in competitions worldwide, with both the Junior and Senior National Team Programs.

== Michigan statistics ==
Legend
GP	Games played	GS	Games started	MPG	Minutes per game
FG%	Field goal percentage	3P%	3-point field goal percentage	FT%	Free throw percentage
RPG	Rebounds per game	APG	Assists per game	SPG	Steals per game
BPG	Blocks per game	PPG	Points per game	**Bold**	Career high

Year	Team	GP	Points	FG%	3P%	FT%	RPG	APG	SPG	BPG	PPG
2005-06	Michigan	29	**203**	43.0%	0.0%	63.3%	**5.2**	0.6	**1.1**	0.9	**7.0**
2006-07	Michigan	27	115	35.4%	0.0%	**77.8%**	4.4	**0.8**	0.7	0.8	4.3
2007-08	Michigan	**32**	201	**53.5%**	**16.7%**	75.0%	4.0	0.6	0.7	0.7	6.3
2008-09	Michigan	30	200	48.9%	0.0%	69.8%	4.3	0.4	1.1	**1.1**	6.7
Career		118	719	45.6%	4.5%	71.6%	4.5	0.6	0.9	0.9	6.1
