= MBWA =

MBWA is an acronym that may be short for:

- Met Basketball Writers Association, a group of sports writers in the greater New York City metropolitan area that helps determine the annual recipient of the Haggerty Award
- Mobile Broadband Wireless Access, an IEEE Standard to enable worldwide deployment of multi-vendor interoperable mobile broadband wireless access networks
- Management by wandering around
