= DeWitt, Michigan =

- City
- City of DeWitt
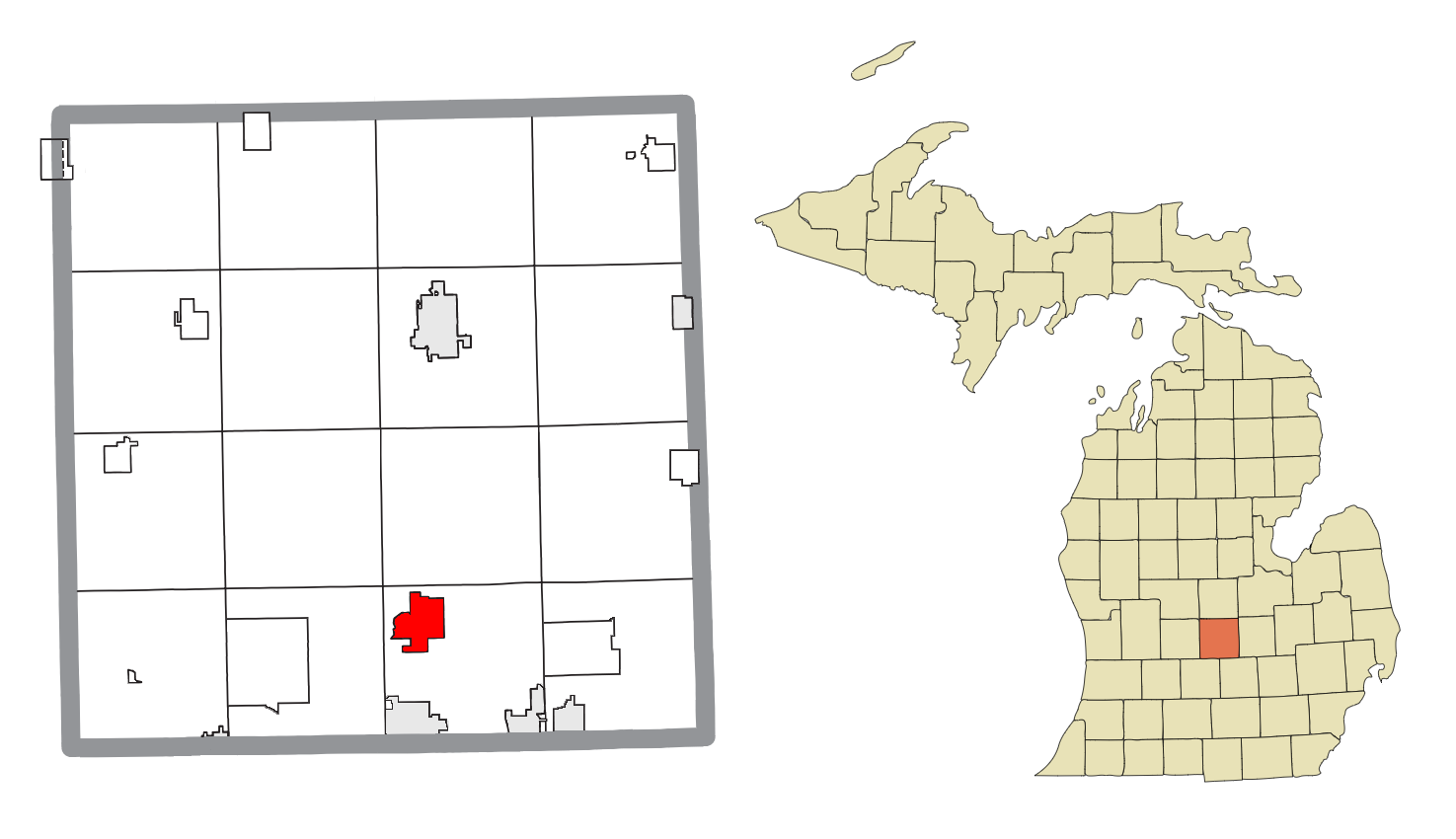
- Location within Clinton County

- Location within the state of Michigan Location within the United States
- Coordinates: 42°50′11″N 84°34′30″W
- Country: United States
- State: Michigan
- County: Clinton
- Settled: 1833
- Incorporated: 1929 (village); 1965 (city)

Government
  - Type: Mayor–council
  - Mayor: Sue Leeming
  - Administrator: Dan Coss

Area
  - Total: 2.98 sq mi (7.72 km^{2})
  - Land: 2.84 sq mi (7.35 km^{2})
  - Water: 0.14 sq mi (0.37 km^{2})
- Elevation: 827 ft (252 m)

Population (2020)
  - Total: 4,776
  - Density: 1,683.3/sq mi (649.94/km^{2})
- Time zone: UTC-5 (Eastern (EST))
  - Summer (DST): UTC-4 (EDT)
- ZIP code(s): 48820
- Area code: 517
- FIPS code: 26-22120
- GNIS feature ID: 1626182
- Website: Official website

DeWitt is a city in Clinton County in the U.S. state of Michigan. The population was 4,776 at the 2020 census. The city is located north of Interstate 69 and west of U.S. Highway 127, just north of the city of Lansing.

== History ==
DeWitt was named after DeWitt Clinton, Governor of New York during the 1820s. It was first settled by Captain David Scott, who moved there from Ann Arbor in 1833, and platted the land. The State Legislature formally created DeWitt Township on March 23, 1836. The first township meeting was held at the house of Captain Scott on April 8, 1836. A gentleman by the name of Welcome J. Partelo was named the township's first Supervisor at that meeting.

It did not take long for the state to divide DeWitt Township into the many townships that we recognize today. In 1837, the township was split in half by a north–south line; the western half became Watertown Township. Two years later, the township was again split in half by an east–west line, and the northern half became Bingham Township. One day later, the governor approved an act, which split the remaining township area in half by an east–west line, and the eastern half became Ossowa Township (renamed Bath Township in 1857). The final split of the township came in 1841 when the northern half of the remaining land became Olive Township. In four years, DeWitt Township went from encompassing the entire county to its current boundary.

The county seat for Clinton County was also located in DeWitt Township from the inception of the county. The county seat remained in DeWitt Township until December 1857 when it was moved to high Hall, in the village of St. Johns, until a new courthouse could be built.

In the early 1900s, the Lansing, St. Johns and St. Louis Railway opened the community to a new era of prosperity. It was not until 1929 when the town was incorporated as a village, and then was no longer under the full jurisdiction of the township.

The area that is now the city was first incorporated as a village in 1929.

On October 21, 1930, a great fire swept though the downtown business district, destroying eight historic and business buildings. This included the destruction of the Clinton House/Hotel, which was a regionally famous establishment. The fire devastated the community, stagnating business growth once again. However, residential development did not slow, and thus DeWitt began its evolvement into the bedroom community that it is today.

The Village of Dewitt was incorporated into a city in 1965.

The DeWitt area was ranked as the 75th best place to live in the United States by CNN Money in 2005.

== Geography ==
According to the United States Census Bureau, the city has a total area of 2.99 square miles (7.74 km^{2}), of which 2.86 square miles (7.41 km^{2}) is land and 0.13 square miles (0.34 km^{2}) is water.

DeWitt is on the Looking Glass River, a tributary of the Grand River.

== Education ==
The DeWitt Public Schools is home to the following schools, which are divided among grade levels:

- Fuerstenau Early Childhood Center (Pre-K)
- Schavey Road Elementary School (Kindergarten and 1st grade)
- Scott Elementary School (2nd and 3rd grades)
- Herbison Woods School (4th and 5th grades)
- DeWitt Middle School (6th-8th grades)
- DeWitt High School (9th-12th grades)

== Demographics ==
Historical population
Census	Pop.	Note	%±
1880	284		—
1930	476		—
1940	651		36.8%
1950	824		26.6%
1960	1,238		50.2%
1970	1,829		47.7%
1980	3,165		73.0%
1990	3,964		25.2%
2000	4,702		18.6%
2010	4,507		−4.1%
2020	4,776		6.0%
U.S. Decennial Census

=== 2020 census ===
As of the 2020 census, DeWitt had a population of 4,776. The median age was 40.0 years. 24.8% of residents were under the age of 18 and 16.8% of residents were 65 years of age or older. For every 100 females there were 91.5 males, and for every 100 females age 18 and over there were 90.2 males age 18 and over.

99.8% of residents lived in urban areas, while 0.2% lived in rural areas.

There were 1,892 households in DeWitt, of which 32.7% had children under the age of 18 living in them. Of all households, 59.5% were married-couple households, 12.5% were households with a male householder and no spouse or partner present, and 23.2% were households with a female householder and no spouse or partner present. About 22.3% of all households were made up of individuals and 9.2% had someone living alone who was 65 years of age or older.

There were 1,950 housing units, of which 3.0% were vacant. The homeowner vacancy rate was 0.8% and the rental vacancy rate was 3.6%.

Racial composition as of the 2020 census
Race	Number	Percent
White	4,287	89.8%
Black or African American	72	1.5%
American Indian and Alaska Native	15	0.3%
Asian	53	1.1%
Native Hawaiian and Other Pacific Islander	2	0.0%
Some other race	55	1.2%
Two or more races	292	6.1%
Hispanic or Latino (of any race)	211	4.4%

=== 2010 census ===
As of the census of 2010, there were 4,507 people, 1,732 households, and 1,314 families living in the city. The population density was 1,575.9 inhabitants per square mile (608.5/km^{2}). There were 1,808 housing units at an average density of 632.2 per square mile (244.1/km^{2}). The racial makeup of the city was 94.9% White, 1.4% African American, 0.4% Native American, 0.9% Asian, 0.5% from other races, and 1.9% from two or more races. Hispanic or Latino of any race were 3.5% of the population.

There were 1,732 households, of which 37.9% had children under the age of 18 living with them, 60.6% were married couples living together, 11.4% had a female householder with no husband present, 3.9% had a male householder with no wife present, and 24.1% were non-families. 20.1% of all households were made up of individuals, and 7% had someone living alone who was 65 years of age or older. The average household size was 2.60 and the average family size was 2.99.

The median age in the city was 39.8 years. 26.6% of residents were under the age of 18; 8% were between the ages of 18 and 24; 23.2% were from 25 to 44; 32.4% were from 45 to 64; and 9.8% were 65 years of age or older. The gender makeup of the city was 48.6% male and 51.4% female.

=== 2000 census ===
As of the census of 2000, there were 4,702 people, 1,624 households, and 1,307 families living in the city. The population density was 1,641.3 inhabitants per square mile (633.7/km^{2}). There were 1,661 housing units at an average density of 579.8 per square mile (223.9/km^{2}). The racial makeup of the city was 95.85% White, 1.02% African American, 0.23% Native American, 0.64% Asian, 0.02% Pacific Islander, 0.40% from other races, and 1.83% from two or more races. Hispanic or Latino of any race were 2.55% of the population.

There were 1,624 households, out of which 50.5% had children under the age of 18 living with them, 65.9% were married couples living together, 11.3% had a female householder with no husband present, and 19.5% were non-families. 16.3% of all households were made up of individuals, and 4.4% had someone living alone who was 65 years of age or older. The average household size was 2.89 and the average family size was 3.25.

In the city, the population was spread out, with 33.8% under the age of 18, 7.2% from 18 to 24, 29.5% from 25 to 44, 24.1% from 45 to 64, and 5.4% who were 65 years of age or older. The median age was 34 years. For every 100 females, there were 99.6 males. For every 100 females age 18 and over, there were 93.6 males.

The median income for a household in the city was $69,174, and the median income for a family was $78,935. Males had a median income of $51,409 versus $35,545 for females. The per capita income for the city was $26,997. About 3.6% of families and 4.3% of the population were below the poverty line, including 4.8% of those under age 18 and 8.6% of those age 65 or over.

== Climate ==
This climatic region is typified by large seasonal temperature differences, with warm to hot (and often humid) summers and cold (sometimes severely cold) winters. According to the Köppen Climate Classification system, DeWitt has a humid continental climate, abbreviated "Dfb" on climate maps.

== Notable people ==
- SungWon Cho, YouTuber and voice actor
- Dave Cutler, software engineer
- Oscar G. Johnson, WWII veteran and Medal of Honor recipient
- Jordyn Wieber, gymnast and Olympic gold medalist
- Steven J. Glew, collector and subject of the Netflix documentary The Pez Outlaw

== Sister cities ==
- Kōka, Shiga, Japan.
