= Vonnie DeLong =

American basketball player and coach

Vonnie (Thompson) DeLong
Personal information
- Born: October 17, 1965 (age 60) Carrollton, Michigan, U.S.
- Listed height: 5 ft 7 in (1.70 m)

Career information
- High school: Carrollton High School (Carrollton, Michigan)
- College: Michigan (1986–1988)
- Position: Guard

Vonnie DeLong, formerly Vonnie Thompson and Vonnie Killmer (born October 17, 1965), is an American women's basketball coach and former player. She played college basketball at both Notre Dame and the University of Michigan. She holds the Michigan Wolverines women's basketball single-season record with 156 assists during the 1987–88 season.

DeLong is currently the head coach of the girls' basketball team at Saginaw Heritage High School. She previously served as a coach at Saginaw's Arthur Hill High School and Saginaw Valley State University. She was inducted into the Saginaw Valley Sports Hall of Fame in 2011.

== Early years ==
DeLong was raised in Carrollton, Michigan, and attended Carrollton High School from 1979 to 1982. She was thrice selected as an All-State player and led Carrollton to three Michigan Class C state championships. She scored over 1,000 points in her high school career and was selected as a third-team All-American as a senior.

== College basketball ==
DeLong enrolled at the University of Notre Dame and played for the Notre Dame Fighting Irish women's basketball team as a freshman. At the start of her sophomore year, she felt she was not given an opportunity to perform. In January 1986, she transferred to the University of Michigan in the middle of the basketball season, citing a lack of chemistry with the Notre Dame coaching staff.

DeLong, then known by her maiden name Vonnie Thompson, played two seasons at Michigan from 1986 to 1988. During her time at Michigan, she was five feet, seven inches tall. In her first year at Michigan, she led the team with 50 steals, averaged 36 minutes per game, and 7.3 points per game, and was named the team's co-MVP. During the 1986–87 season, she also broke Michigan's single-season record and led the Big Ten Conference with 147 assists.

During the 1987–88 season, DeLong broke her own single-season record with 156 assists. Michigan head coach Bud VanDeWege called her a "gym rat," which he described as "a player who likes to pick up a ball and play. It's someone who keeps playing during vacations or even after the season is over."

DeLong's annual assist totals still rank as the two highest single-season totals in program history. She also holds Michigan's single-game record with her total of 12 assists against Northeastern on December 5, 1987. Her two-year total of 303 assists ranks eighth on Michigan's list of career assist leaders. DeLong graduated from Michigan with a bachelor's degree in sports management and communications.

== Career statistics ==
Year	Team	GP	GS	MPG	FG%	3P%	FT%	RPG	APG	SPG	BPG	TO	PPG
1987–88	Michigan	28	-	-	38.0	33.3	88.0	3.9	5.6	1.6	0.0	-	7.3
Career		28	-	-	38.0	33.3	88.0	3.9	5.6	1.6	0.0	-	7.3
Statistics retrieved from Sports-Reference.

== Coaching career ==
After graduating from Michigan, DeLong, then known as Vonnie Killmer, worked as a school teacher in the Saginaw area. She served as a basketball coach at Saginaw's Arthur Hill High School starting in 1993 and later also became the school's athletic director. In 1998, her team advanced to the state championship game. She compiled a 142–65 record in 10 seasons at Arthur Hill.

In 2004, she was hired as the head coach of the women's basketball team at Saginaw Valley State University (SVSU). Her husband, Greg Killmer, died in a car crash in 2005 while she was travelling with the SVSU basketball team. She resigned as SVSU's head coach in March 2008, citing a desire to spend more time with her two daughters. In four years as the head coach at SVSU, she compiled a 35–72 record

In 2010, DeLong was inducted into the Saginaw County Sports Hall of Fame.

After five years away from coaching, DeLong was hired in 2013 as the girls' basketball coach at Saginaw Heritage High School. At the time, her daughters Kacy and Riley Killmer were students at Heritage. DeLong noted, "I actually did try to stay away . . . I tried hard. . . . But I did miss it. I miss the kids. I miss just being involved in it."
