= DeWitt High School (Michigan) =

High school in Michigan, United States

Coordinates: 42.8187°N 84.5808°W

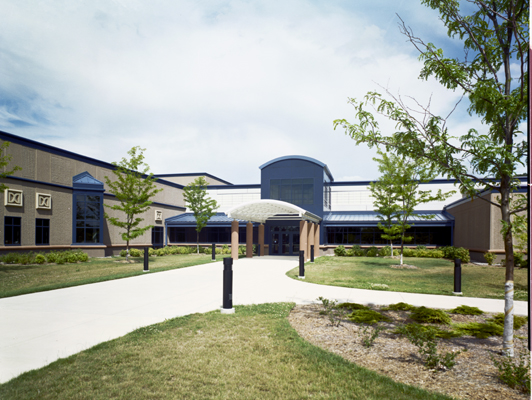

Location
- 13601 Panther Drive; DeWitt, (Clinton County), Michigan 48820; United States

Information
- Type: Public high school
- School district: DeWitt Public Schools
- Principal: Matthew Dodson
- Staff: 47.92 (FTE)
- Enrollment: 962 (2023-2024)
- Student to teacher ratio: 20.08
- Colors: Blue and gold
- Athletics conference: Capital Area Activities Conference
- Nickname: Panthers
- Website: https://dhs.dewittschools.net/

Student assessments
- 2021–22 school year Change vs. prior year

M-STEP 11th grade proficiency rates (Science / Social Studies)
- Advanced %: 26.1 / 14.9
- Proficient %: 34.2 / 38.5
- PR. Proficient %: 11.7 / –
- Not Proficient %: 27.9 / ≤5

Average test scores
- SAT Total: 1049.2 (▼ −5.5)

DeWitt High School is a public high school in the city of DeWitt, Michigan, United States. It is managed by the DeWitt Public Schools district.
