= Michigan Wolverines women's basketball =

Women's basketball team of the University of Michigan

2026–27 Michigan Wolverines women's basketball team
- University: University of Michigan
- First season: 1973–74
- Head coach: Kim Barnes Arico (15th season)
- Location: Ann Arbor, Michigan
- Arena: Crisler Center (capacity: 12,707)
- Conference: Big Ten
- Nickname: Wolverines
- Colors: Maize and blue
- Student section: Maize Rage
- All-time record: 762–764 (.499)

NCAA Division I tournament Elite Eight
- 2022, 2026
Other NCAA Division I tournament results
Sweet Sixteen	2021, 2022, 2026
Appearances	1990, 1998, 2000, 2001, 2012, 2013, 2018, 2019, 2021, 2022, 2023, 2024, 2025, 2026

Uniforms
Home	Away	Alternate

The Michigan Wolverines women's basketball team is the intercollegiate women's basketball program representing the University of Michigan. The school competes in the Big Ten Conference in Division I of the National Collegiate Athletic Association (NCAA). The team plays their home games at Crisler Center in Ann Arbor, Michigan, and are led by head coach Kim Barnes Arico. They have made 14 NCAA tournament appearances.

== History ==
Michigan began playing intercollegiate women's basketball in 1973–74, when inaugural head coach Vic Katch led the team to a 3–8 record (0–1 against Big Ten teams). There was no form of conference competition for the Wolverines until the 1976–77 season, and even then it was not officially sanctioned by the Big Ten until 1982–83. Michigan did not qualify for postseason play until earning an NCAA tournament bid in 1990, winning a game under head coach Bud VanDeWege, which would remain its only tournament appearance and win until Sue Guevara led the Wolverines to five straight postseason appearances (in both the NCAA and WNIT tournaments) between 1998 and 2002, with her first win in the tournament coming in 2001.

The team's best postseason performance in the NCAA Tournament is advancing to the Elite Eight, which it achieved in 2022 and again in 2026. The Wolverines won the WNIT tournament in 2017, and have also reached the WNIT semifinals twice: in 2010 and 2015. Michigan has never won a Big Ten championship, either in the regular season or in the conference tournament. The closest it has come is 2nd place during the 1999-2000 regular season, tied for 2nd in the 2025-26 regular season and the semifinals of the conference tournament eight times, including the last three seasons in 2024, 2025 and 2026.

Since 2012, Michigan is coached by Kim Barnes Arico, the former St. John's Red Storm head coach and two-time Big East Coach of the Year. During a February 2017 game against Michigan State, the Wolverines set an attendance record of 12,707 in the first home sellout in program history, which more than doubled the previous record of 5,991. The second-largest home crowd (8,313) attended a January 2018 game against Ohio State. Later that same week, during the January 13th game against the Nebraska Cornhuskers, Katelynn Flaherty scored her 2,443rd point, surpassing Glen Rice as the school's all-time leading scorer, man or woman. Flaherty would finish her career with a school-record 2,776 points.

During the 2017–18 season, Barnes Arico became the winningest coach in program history. On July 12, 2018, Barnes Arico signed a contract extension with the Wolverines through the 2022–23 season.

During the 2021–22 season, Michigan reached their highest ranking ever in the AP Poll at No. 4. On December 19, 2021, Michigan earned the program's first ever win over a top-five ranked team when they defeated No. 5 Baylor 74–68 in overtime. On January 31, 2022, Michigan earned their second ever win over a top-five ranked team when they defeated No. 5 Indiana 65–50. They earned a 3 seed for the 2022 NCAA Tournament, the highest seed in program history. This earned them the right to host the 1st and 2nd rounds of the tournament at the Crisler Center for the 1st time ever.

== Coaching staff ==
As of 2025–26 season.

Name	Position coached	Consecutive seasons at Michigan in current position
Kim Barnes Arico	Head coach	14th
Melanie Moore	Assistant Coach	3rd
Justine Raterman	Assistant Coach	2nd
Natalie Achonwa	Assistant Coach / General Manager	2nd
Jordann Reese	Assistant Coach	1st
Danielle Rauch	Assistant Coach	1st
Amy Mulligan	Director of Operations	14th

=== Head coaching records ===
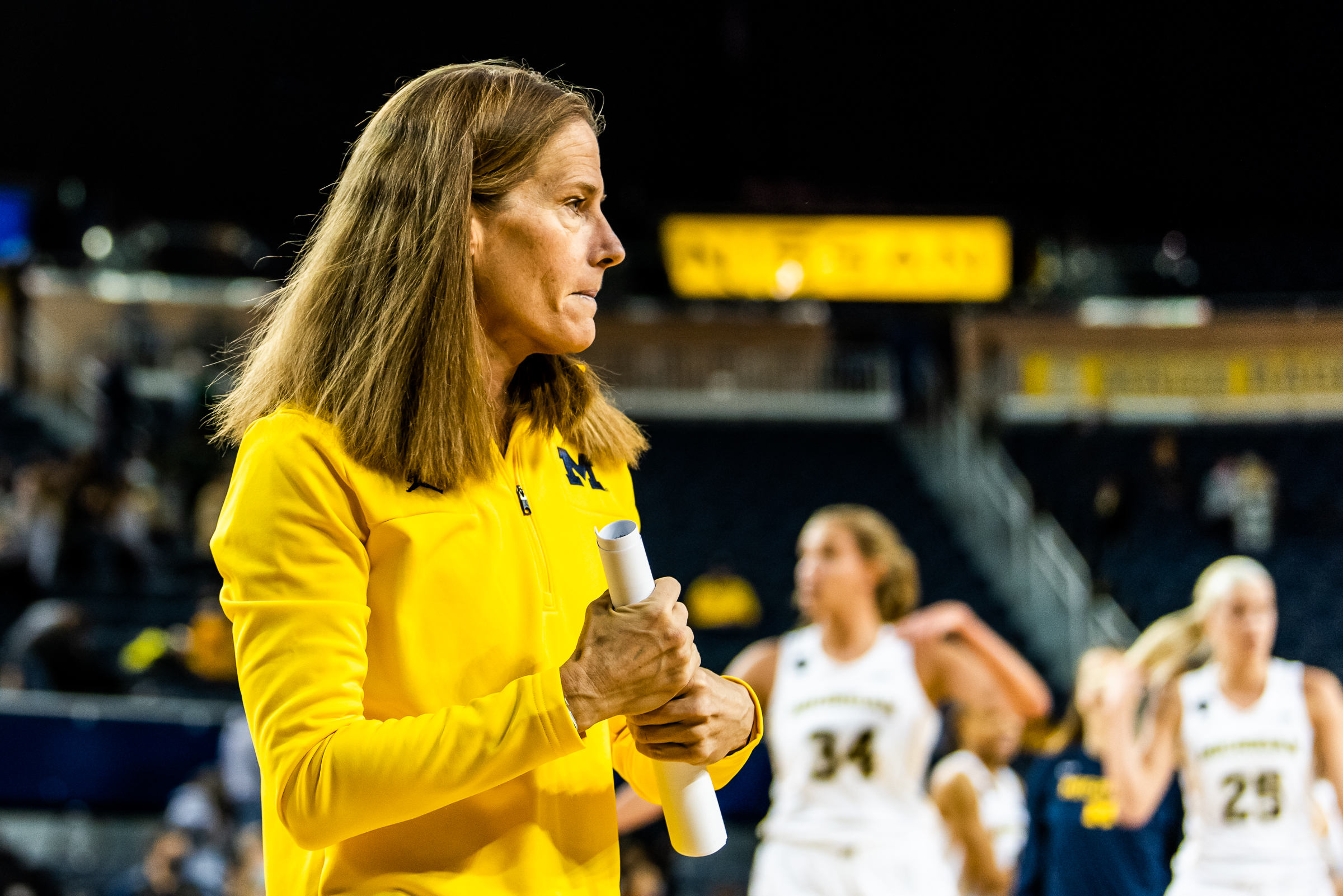
Kim Barnes Arico, the current head coach of the Michigan Wolverines women's basketball team.

Head coach	Years	Seasons	Overall	Pct.	Conf.	Pct.	NCAA Berths
Vic Katch	1973–74	1	3–8	.273	0–1	.000	–
Carmel Borders	1974–77	3	23–28	.451	4–8	.333	–
Gloria Soluk	1977–84	7	66–120	.355	22–61	.265	0
Bud VanDeWege	1984–92	8	93–132	.413	41–103	.285	1
Trish Roberts	1992–96	4	20–88	.185	5–63	.074	0
Sue Guevara	1996–2003	7	123–82	.600	57–55	.509	3
Cheryl Burnett	2003–07	4	35–83	.297	10–54	.156	0
Kevin Borseth	2007–12	5	87–73	.544	38–48	.442	1
Kim Barnes Arico	2012–present	14	312–151	.674	144–94	.605	9
Totals		53	762–764	.499	321–487	.397	14

Head coaching records through March 28, 2026.

== Current roster ==
2026–27 Michigan Wolverines women's basketball team
Players
Coaches

Pos.	#	Name	Height	Year	Previous school	Hometown
G	1	Olivia Olson	6 ft 1 in (1.85 m)	Jr	Benilde-St. Margaret's	New Hope, MN
G	2	Macy Brown	6 ft 0 in (1.83 m)	Sr	East Grand Rapids HS	East Grand Rapids, MI
G	3	Mila Holloway (injured)	5 ft 10 in (1.78 m)	Jr	Legacy Early College	Charlotte, NC
G	4	Dallas Loughridge	5 ft 6 in (1.68 m)	Sr	St Paul's Anglican Grammar	Victoria, Australia
F	7	Jessica Fields	6 ft 1 in (1.85 m)	So	Mount Paran Christian	Kennesaw, GA
G	12	Syla Swords	6 ft 0 in (1.83 m)	Jr	Long Island Lutheran HS	Sudbury, ON
F	15	Ashley Sofilkanich	6 ft 3 in (1.91 m)	Jr	Bucknell	South Amboy, NJ
F	22	Kendall Dudley	6 ft 2 in (1.88 m)	Jr	UCLA	Manassas Park, VA
F	23	Ciara Byars	6 ft 2 in (1.88 m)	So	George Rogers Clark HS	Paris, KY
G	24	Devin Cosgriff	5 ft 10 in (1.78 m)	Fr	Archbishop Mitty HS	Livermore, CA
F	32	Fope Ayo	6 ft 5 in (1.96 m)	Fr	Austin Prep	Methuen, MA
G/F	33	Te'Yala Delfosse	6 ft 3 in (1.91 m)	Jr	Ewing HS	Ewing, NJ
F	34	Aaiyanna Dunbar	6 ft 2 in (1.88 m)	Jr	Blackman HS	Murfreesboro, TN
G	40	Courtney Ogden	6 ft 1 in (1.85 m)	GS	Stanford	Atlanta, GA

Head coach

- Kim Barnes Arico (alum: Montclair State)

Assistant coach(es)

- Melanie Moore (Siena)
- Justine Raterman (Dayton)
- Jordann Reese (Drake)
- Sean Bair (Dickinson)
- Danielle Rauch (Michigan)

Legend

- (C) Team captain
- (S) Suspended
- (I) Ineligible
- (W) Walk-on
- Injured
- Current redshirt

Roster

== Crisler Center (arena) ==
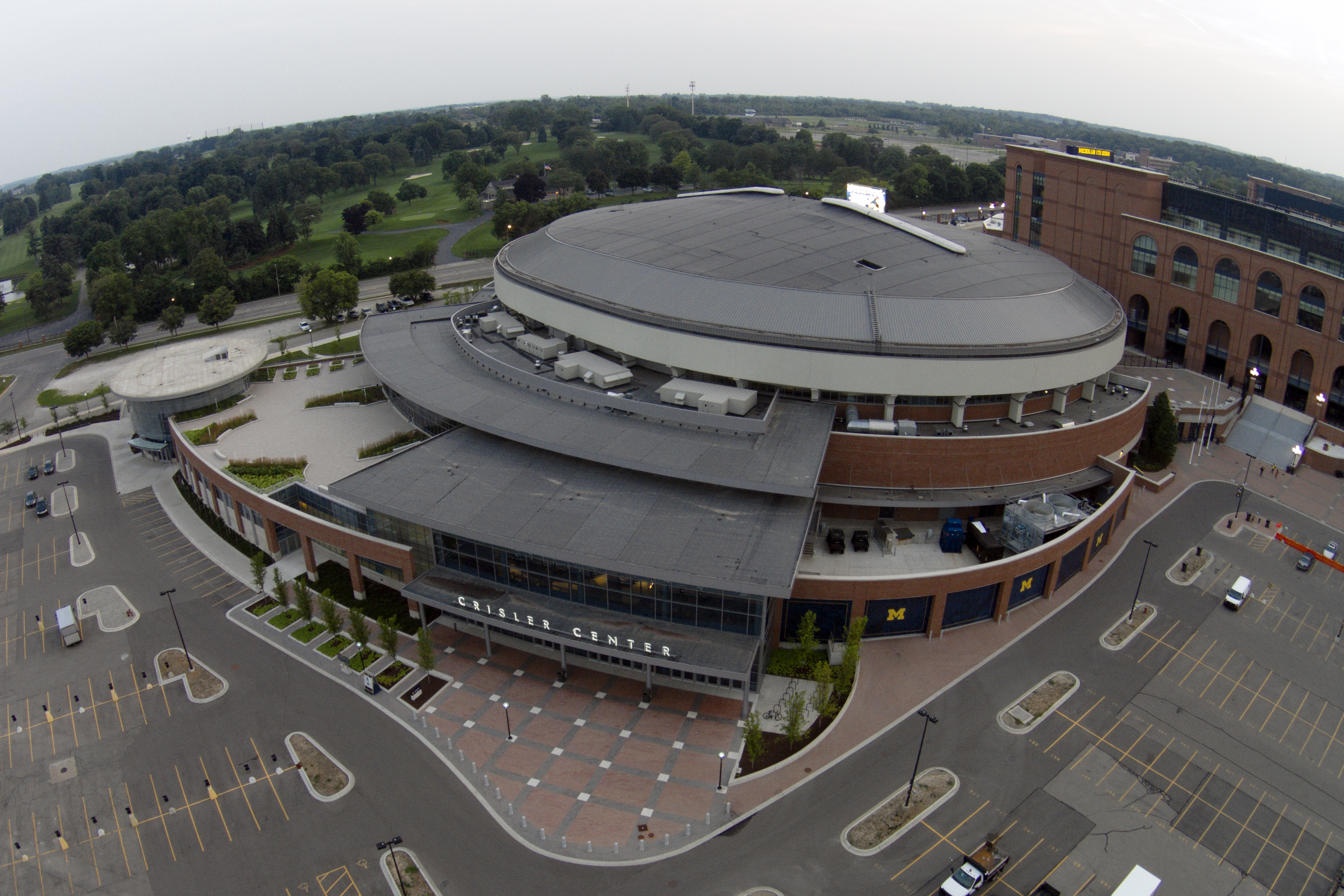
Crisler Center, as seen from above.

Michigan has played its home games at Crisler Center (previously known as Crisler Arena) since it began intercollegiate play during the 1973–74 season. The first women's basketball game played at Crisler took place on February 4, 1974 and saw the Western Michigan Broncos defeat Michigan 54–28. Crisler Arena was built in 1967 at a cost of $7.2 million, and has undergone three major renovations since, in 1998, 2001, and 2012. In 2002, the women's locker room was more than doubled in size and given a complete facelift. The 2012 renovation saw the addition of the William Davidson Player Development Center (WDPDC), a 57,000-foot basketball facility for both the women's and men's teams adjacent to the arena proper, and the renaming of the entire complex to Crisler Center. The first floor of the WDPDC houses two basketball practice courts, team locker rooms for both players and coaches, athletic medicine facilities, and an equipment room, while the second floor is home to offices for both the men's and women's coaching staffs and administrative functions, as well as rooms dedicated to recruiting, analyzing game film, and strength and conditioning. The 2012 renovation also resulted in major upgrades to the arena's infrastructure, a new scoreboard, replacement of all the seats in both the upper and lower bowls, more handicap-accessible seating, and major improvements to the arena's entrances and concourses. Completed in two separate phases, it cost $72 million in total.

== Honored players and coaches ==
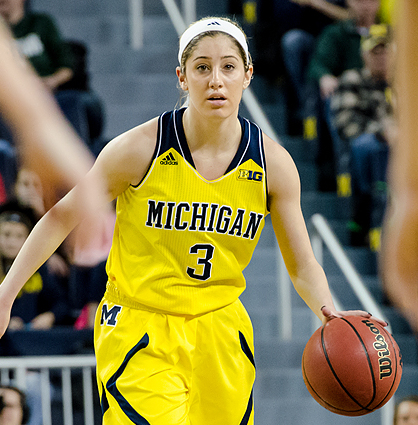
Katelynn Flaherty, the all-time leading scorer in men's and women's Michigan basketball history.

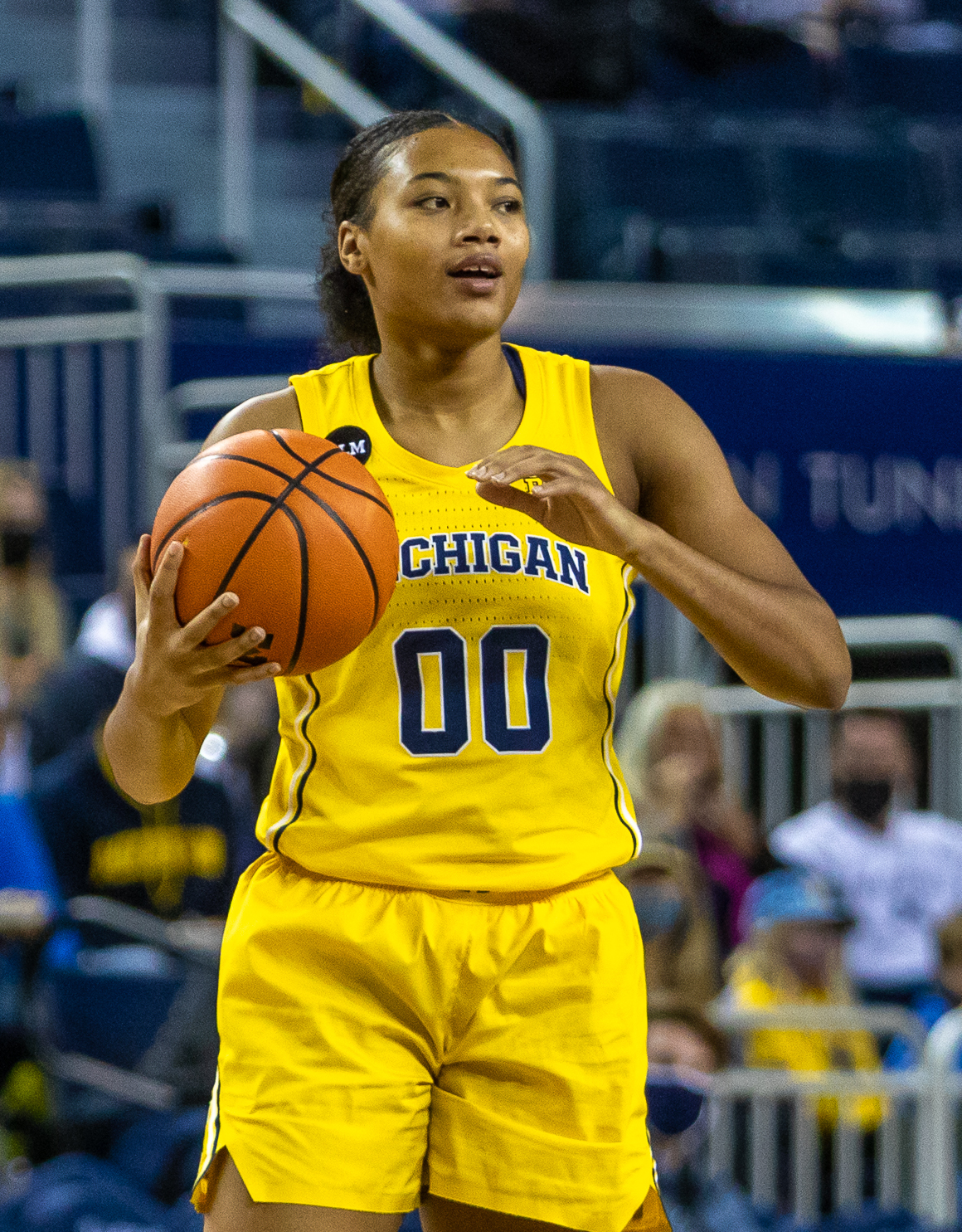
Naz Hillmon, 2021 Big Ten Player of the Year and Michigan women's basketball's all-time leading rebounder.

=== Honored jerseys ===
Jerseys honored but numbers still active:

Michigan Wolverines honored jerseys
No.	Player	Pos.	Tenure	Honored
00	Naz Hillmon	PF	2019–22	February 15, 2026
3	Katelynn Flaherty	PG	2015–18	February 28, 2026
21	Diane Dietz	F	1979–82	January 11, 2026

=== Awards and honors ===
Women's National Invitation Tournament MVP

- 2017 – Katelynn Flaherty

Big Ten Player of the Year

- 2021 – Naz Hillmon

Big Ten Freshman of the Year

- 1997 – Stacey Thomas
- 2019 – Naz Hillmon
- 2025 – Olivia Olson

Big Ten Defensive Player of the Year

- 2000 – Stacey Thomas

Big Ten Sixth Player of the Year

- 2015 – Katelynn Flaherty
- 2019 – Naz Hillmon

All-Americans

- 2021 – Naz Hillmon (USBWA, WBCA)
- 2022 – Naz Hillmon (AP, USBWA, WBCA)
- 2026 — Olivia Olson (ESPN, NYT, TSN, AP, USBWA)

Big Ten Coach of the Year

- 1990 – Bud VanDeWege
- 1998 – Sue Guevara
- 2000 – Sue Guevara
- 2017 – Kim Barnes Arico
- 2022 – Kim Barnes Arico

=== WNBA Draft history ===
Year	Rnd	Pick	Overall	Player name	Position	WNBA team	Notes
1998	3	7	27	Pollyanna Johns	C	Charlotte Sting	
2000	2	7	23	Stacey Thomas	F	Portland Fire	
2001	4	10	58	Anne Thorius	G	Orlando Miracle	
2002	3	12	44	Alayne Ingram	G	Sacramento Monarchs	
2004	3	6	32	Jennifer Smith	C	Detroit Shock	
2005	2	10	23	Tabitha Pool	F	New York Liberty	
2022	2	3	15	Naz Hillmon	C	Atlanta Dream	
2023	2	3	15	Leigha Brown	G	Atlanta Dream	
2025	3	9	34	Jordan Hobbs	G	Seattle Storm	

== Statistical leaders ==
=== All-time leaders ===
- Points: Katelynn Flaherty (2,776)
- Rebounds: Naz Hillmon (1,063)
- Assists: Siera Thompson (553)
- Steals: Stacey Thomas (372)
- Blocks: Trish Andrew (367)

=== Season leaders ===
- Points: Katelynn Flaherty (774, 2016)
- Rebounds: Cyesha Goree (367, 2015)
- Assists: Siera Thompson (178, 2017)
- Steals: Stacey Thomas (110, 1999)
- Blocks: Trish Andrew (136, 1992)

== NCAA tournament results ==
Michigan has appeared in fourteen NCAA Tournaments, with a combined record of 15–14.

Year	Seed	Round	Opponent	Result
1990	#10	First Round; Second Round	#7 Oklahoma State #2 NC State	W 77–68; L 64−81
1998	#10	First Round	#7 UCLA	L 58−65
2000	#8	First Round	#9 Stanford	L 74−81^{OT}
2001	#8	First Round; Second Round	#9 Virginia #1 Notre Dame	W 81–71; L 54−88
2012	#11	First Round	#6 Oklahoma	L 67−88
2013	#8	First Round; Second Round	#9 Villanova #1 Stanford	W 60–52; L 40−73
2018	#7	First Round; Second Round	#10 Northern Colorado #2 Baylor	W 75–61; L 58−80
2019	#8	First Round; Second Round	#9 Kansas State #1 Louisville	W 84–54; L 50−71
2021	#6	First Round; Second Round; Sweet Sixteen	#11 Florida Gulf Coast #3 Tennessee #2 Baylor	W 87–66; W 70–55; L 75–78^{OT}
2022	#3	First Round; Second Round; Sweet Sixteen; Elite Eight	#14 American #11 Villanova #10 South Dakota #1 Louisville	W 74–39; W 64–49; W 52–49; L 50–62
2023	#6	First Round; Second Round	#11 UNLV #3 LSU	W 71–59; L 42–66
2024	#9	First Round	#8 Kansas	L 72−81^{OT}
2025	#6	First Round; Second Round	#11 Iowa State #3 Notre Dame	W 80–74; L 55–76
2026	#2	First Round; Second Round; Sweet Sixteen; Elite Eight	#15 Holy Cross #7 NC State #3 Louisville #1 Texas	W 83–48; W 92–63; W 71–52; L 41–77

== Rivalries ==
- Michigan—Michigan State
- Michigan—Ohio State
