= Diane Dietz =

American basketball player

Diane Dietz is a former All-American basketball player. She played for the University of Michigan from 1979 to 1982 and is the school's fourth all-time scoring leader with 2,076 points. She also set the Big Ten Conference single-game scoring record with 45 points in 1982. In 1996, Dietz became the first women's basketball player inducted into the University of Michigan Athletic Hall of Honor. And in 2009, she was inducted into the Academic All-America Hall of Fame.

== Basketball player ==
Diane Dietz began her basketball career at Farmington Hills Mercy High School. With teammates Katie McNamara and Lynn Yadach, Dietz led the Mercy Marlins to four straight state finals including an undefeated season and 1977 Class A Michigan state championship.

While attending Mercy, Dietz earned a 3.6 grade point average and won varsity letters in basketball, volleyball and softball all four years. As a senior, she earned all-state honors in all three sports. Dietz later recalled, "I had a lot of diverse interests in high school. Everybody remembers basketball, but I enjoyed tennis and golf. I loved music, the choir and the theater. I really remember liking school."

After graduating from Mercy, Dietz enrolled at the University of Michigan where she played basketball from 1979 to 1982 and became the school's all-time leading scorer with 2,076 career points. No other women's basketball player at Michigan surpassed the 2,000 point mark in career points until Katelynn Flaherty finished with 2,2776 career points in 2018.

On February 27, 1982, Dietz set a Big Ten Conference single-game scoring record with 45 points against the University of Illinois. That record stood for 22 years until Penn State guard Kelly Mazzante scored 49 points in a game in 2004.

As a senior, Dietz was among the first women athletes to receive the Big Ten Medal of Honor, awarded to student athletes for outstanding academic and athletic achievement.

== Business career ==
After graduating from Michigan, Dietz received a Juris Doctor degree from Thomas M. Cooley Law School in Lansing, Michigan. She began her professional career as a lawyer working for law firms Paskin, Nagi & Baxter P.C. in Troy, Michigan, and Howard & Howard Attorneys, P.C., in Bloomfield Hills, Michigan.

After leaving the private practice of law, Dietz worked for many years in the cable television industry. She began in the business as Vice President of Corporate and Legal Affairs for Continental Cablevision's Midwest Region. She joined Comcast Corporation in 1996. At Comcast, she served as the Vice President of Corporate Affairs for the Midwest Division. In 2005, Dietz relocated to Philadelphia upon being promoted to a position as Comcast's Senior Director of Public Affairs and Vice President of The Comcast Foundation.

Dietz has also served as a board member for the Detroit Metro Convention and Visitors Bureau, United Way of Southeast Pennsylvania, Michigan Cable & Telecommunications Association, and the University of Michigan Alumni Association.

In October 2008, Dietz was named chief marketing officer for Cranbrook Educational Community, a collection of private schools and educational instiutitions in Bloomfield Hills, Michigan. In her position at Cranbrook, Dietz oversees marketing and communication efforts, community outreach and government relations.

In March 2010, she was hired as the Big Ten Conference Chief Communications Officer.

== Honors and awards ==
In 1995, Dietz was the recipient of the University of Michigan's Gerald R. Ford Scholar-Athlete Award. She was the fifth person to receive the awarded, granted to former Michigan athletes who have made extraordinary contributions in their post-collegiate careers.

In 1996, she was inducted into the University of Michigan Athletic Hall of Honor. She was the first women's basketball player inducted into the Hall, joining the ranks of Fielding H. Yost, Tom Harmon, Cazzie Russell, Rudy Tomjanovich and Gerald R. Ford.

While at the University of Michigan, Dietz was a three-time recipient of CoSIDA Academic All-America honors in 1980 (second team),1981 (first team) and 1982 (first team).

In May 2009, Dietz was one of five former NCAA student athletes inducted into the Academic All-America Hall of Fame as part of the 2009 induction class. She was the second University of Michigan athlete inducted into the Hall, joining Richard Balzhiser (1952–1953). The Academic All-America Hall of Fame was established in 1988 to recognize student athletes who were recognized as Academic All-Americans as student athletes and who have achieved lifetime success in their professional careers and demonstrated commitment to philanthropic causes in their community. As of 2009, fewer than 100 individuals had been inducted into the Academic All-America Hall of Fame.

In March 2010, Dietz was featured on CNBC's special documentary called "Boomer's" produced by Tom Brokaw.

== See also ==
- University of Michigan Athletic Hall of Honor
