= List of Michigan Wolverines women's basketball seasons =

This is a list of seasons completed by the Michigan Wolverines women's basketball program. The program has an all-time record of 761–763, with fourteen NCAA tournament appearances and nine Women's National Invitation Tournament (WNIT) appearances. The program's only postseason championship was the 2017 WNIT. The 2016–17 and 2025–26 Wolverines own the single-season program-record for wins, 28.

== Seasons ==
Statistics overview
Season	Coach	Overall	Conference	Standing	Postseason
Vic Katch (Independent) (1973–1974)
1973–74	Vic Katch	3–8	0–1		
Vic Katch:		3–8 (.273)	0–1 (.000)		
Carmel Borders (Independent) (1974–1977)
1974–75	Carmel Borders	3–7	0–2		
1975–76	Carmel Borders	12–6	3–2		
1976–77	Carmel Borders	8–15	1–4	T-8th* (Note: An asterisk (*) indicates non-Big Ten sanctioned championship play.)	
Carmel Borders:		23–28 (.451)	4–8 (.333)		
Gloria Soluk (Independent, Big Ten) (1977–1984)
1977–78	Gloria Soluk	8–16	1–7	T-7th*	
1978–79	Gloria Soluk	13–14	3–6	T-7th*	
1979–80	Gloria Soluk	8–20	0–7		
1980–81	Gloria Soluk	12–15	4–5	T-5th*	
1981–82	Gloria Soluk	17–9	10–4	T-7th*	
Big Ten Conference
1982–83	Gloria Soluk	4–24	2–16	T-9th	
1983–84	Gloria Soluk	4–22	2–16	9th	
Gloria Soluk:		66–120 (.355)	22–61 (.265)		
Bud VanDeWege (Big Ten) (1984–1992)
1984–85	Bud VanDeWege	7–21	1–17	10th	
1985–86	Bud VanDeWege	14–14	8–10	7th	
1986–87	Bud VanDeWege	9–18	2–16	10th	
1987–88	Bud VanDeWege	14–14	7–11	T-6th	
1988–89	Bud VanDeWege	11–17	5–13	T-8th	
1989–90	Bud VanDeWege	20–10	11–7	T-4th	NCAA second round
1990–91	Bud VanDeWege	11–17	4–14	9th	
1991–92	Bud VanDeWege	7–21	3–15	T-9th	
Bud VanDeWege:		93–132 (.413)	41–103 (.285)		
Trish Roberts (Big Ten) (1992–1996)
1992–93	Trish Roberts	2–25	1–17	11th	
1993–94	Trish Roberts	3–24	0–18	11th	
1994–95	Trish Roberts	8–19	3–13	T-10th	
1995–96	Trish Roberts	7–20	1–15	10th	
Trish Roberts:		20–88 (.185)	5–63 (.074)		
Sue Guevara (Big Ten) (1997–2004)
1996–97	Sue Guevara	15–11	7–9	T-8th	
1997–98	Sue Guevara	19–10	10–6	T-3rd	NCAA first round
1998–99	Sue Guevara	18–12	8–8	T-6th	WNIT Second Round
1999–2000	Sue Guevara	22–8	13–3	2nd	NCAA first round
2000–01	Sue Guevara	19–12	10–6	5th	NCAA second round
2001–02	Sue Guevara	17–13	6–10	9th	WNIT first round
2002–03	Sue Guevara	13–16	3–13	T-10th	
Sue Guevara:		123–82 (.600)	57–55 (.509)		
Cheryl Burnett (Big Ten) (2003–2007)
2003–04	Cheryl Burnett	14–17	6–10	7th	
2004–05	Cheryl Burnett	5–23	1–15	11th	
2005–06	Cheryl Burnett	6–23	0–16	11th	
2006–07	Cheryl Burnett	10–20	3–13	10th	
Cheryl Burnett:		35–83 (.297)	10–54 (.156)		
Kevin Borseth (Big Ten) (2007–2012)
2007–08	Kevin Borseth	19–14	9–9	T-6th	WNIT Quarterfinals
2008–09	Kevin Borseth	10–20	3–15	11th	
2009–10	Kevin Borseth	21–14	8–10	T-7th	WNIT semifinals
2010–11	Kevin Borseth	17–13	10–6	T-4th	WNIT first round
2011–12	Kevin Borseth	20–12	8–8	7th	NCAA first round
Kevin Borseth:		87–73 (.544)	38–48 (.442)		
Kim Barnes Arico (Big Ten) (2012–present)
2012–13	Kim Barnes Arico	22–11	9–7	T-5th	NCAA second round
2013–14	Kim Barnes Arico	20–14	8–8	T-5th	WNIT third round
2014–15	Kim Barnes Arico	20–15	8–10	8th	WNIT semifinals
2015–16	Kim Barnes Arico	21–14	9–9	T-7th	WNIT semifinals
2016–17	Kim Barnes Arico	28–9	11–5	3rd	WNIT Champions
2017–18	Kim Barnes Arico	23–10	10–6	6th	NCAA second round
2018–19	Kim Barnes Arico	22–12	11–7	4th	NCAA second round
2019–20	Kim Barnes Arico	21–11	10–8	7th	Cancelled due to COVID-19 pandemic
2020–21	Kim Barnes Arico	16–6	9–4	4th	NCAA Sweet Sixteen
2021–22	Kim Barnes Arico	25–7	13–4	T-3rd	NCAA Elite Eight
2022–23	Kim Barnes Arico	23–10	11–7	T-5th	NCAA second round
2023–24	Kim Barnes Arico	20–14	9–9	T-6th	NCAA first round
2024–25	Kim Barnes Arico	23–11	11–7	T-4th	NCAA second round
2025–26	Kim Barnes Arico	28–7	15–3	T-2nd	NCAA Elite Eight
Kim Barnes Arico:		312–151 (.674)	144–94 (.605)		
Total:		762–764 (.499)			
National champion Postseason invitational champion Conference regular season champion Conference regular season and conference tournament champion Division regular season champion Division regular season and conference tournament champion Conference tournament champion
