= List of Michigan Wolverines women's basketball head coaches =

The Michigan Wolverines women's basketball program is a college basketball team that represents the University of Michigan in the Big Ten Conference of the National Collegiate Athletic Association (NCAA). The team has had nine head coaches in its history. The current head coach is Kim Barnes Arico who was hired in 2012.

Kim Barnes Arico is the all-time leader in games coached (360), wins (241), and winning percentage. Kim Barnes Arico is the first and only head coach to have led the team to a postseason championship.

== List of coaches ==
		Overall		Conference		
Coach	Years	Record	Pct.	Record	Pct.	Note
Vic Katch	1973–74	3–8	.273	0–1	.000	
Carmel Borders	1974–77	23–28	.451	4–8	.333	
Gloria Soluk	1977–84	66–120	.355	22–61	.265	
Bud VanDeWege	1984–92	93–132	.413	41–103	.285	
Trish Roberts	1992–96	20–88	.185	5–63	.074	
Sue Guevara	1996–2003	123–82	.600	57–55	.509	
Cheryl Burnett	2003–07	35–83	.297	10–54	.156	
Kevin Borseth	2008–12	87–73	.544	38–48	.442	
Kim Barnes Arico	2012–present	241–119	.669	109–75	.592	2017 WNIT Champions
Total	1973–present	691–733	.485	286–468	.379	
