= Marquis Floyd =

American football player (born 1980)

No. 19, 27, 38
- Position: Cornerback

Personal information
- Born: March 17, 1980 (age 46); Monroe, Georgia, U.S.
- Listed height: 6 ft 0 in (1.83 m)
- Listed weight: 190 lb (86 kg)

Career information
- High school: Area (Monroe)
- College: West Georgia
- NFL draft: 2003: undrafted

Career history
- Tennessee Valley Vipers (2004); Rio Grande Valley Dorados (2005); San Jose SaberCats (2006–2008); Seattle Seahawks (2008–2009)*; Cleveland Browns (2009); Dallas Cowboys (2009–2010)*; Arizona Rattlers (2011); Las Vegas Locomotives (2011); Arizona Rattlers (2012); Las Vegas Locomotives (2012); Arizona Rattlers (2013–2016)
- * Offseason or practice squad member only

Awards and highlights
- 4× ArenaBowl champion (2007, 2012, 2013, 2014); 2× First-team All-Arena (2008, 2014); AFL Defensive Back of the Year (2014); af2 Ironman of the Year (2005)

Career AFL statistics
- Total tackles: 627
- Pass deflections: 105
- Interceptions: 60
- Stats at ArenaFan.com

Marquis Floyd (born March 17, 1980) is an American former professional football cornerback who played in the Arena Football League (AFL). He was signed by the Tennessee Valley Vipers of the af2 as a street free agent in 2004. He played college football at West Georgia.

== Early life ==
Floyd attended Monroe Area High School, where he was a four sport athlete. He played football, baseball, basketball and track.

He was the MVP of the basketball team his junior year and senior years. He won the 'Best Sprinter' award from his track team and 'Best Outfielder' honor for baseball.

== College career ==
Floyd accepted a football scholarship from the University of West Georgia, where he was a three-time American Football Coaches Association (AFCA) All-American. He led the Braves in interceptions in each of his last three seasons and holds the school record for career interceptions with 19. Floyd recorded 231 tackles, 164 solo during his four seasons.

He holds the school's all-time punt return yards record with 982 on 125 returns. Floyd ended his college career participating in the 2003 Cactus Bowl Division II all-star classic in Kingsville, Texas. Floyd was named Team MVP his senior year.

== Professional career ==
=== Tennessee Valley Vipers ===
Floyd began his professional career playing in 16 games with the Tennessee Valley Vipers of af2 in 2004. He led team with 17 passes defensed while posting 37.0 tackles, 27 solo and two fumble recoveries. Floyd had 20 receptions for 242 yards and three touchdowns and ran for seven yards and two touchdowns.

=== Rio Grande Valley Dorados ===
In 2005, Floyd played in all 16 games for the Rio Grande Valley Dorados earning af2 Ironman of the Year honors. He recorded a team-best 101 receptions for 1,452 yards and 29 touchdowns with 23 rush yards and four touchdowns on 20 carries. Floyd caught at least one touchdown pass in all 16 games. He placed fourth in the league with nine interceptions. Floyd added 47.0 tackles, 42 solo, 11 passes defensed and two forced fumbles. He earned league weekly recognition twice and was named player of the game seven times.

=== San Jose SaberCats ===
On October 10, 2005, Floyd signed with the San Jose SaberCats of the Arena Football League.

In 2006, Floyd played in 13 games his rookie season. He finished second on team with 46.5 tackles and tied for second with three interceptions. Foyde returned his first career interception for a touchdown. He tied for third in the league with four forced fumbles. Floyd had 203 yards and a touchdown on 21 receptions and scored a rush touchdown on two attempts. He spent two games on Injured Reserve with a groin injury.

As a starting wide receiver / defensive back, Floyd recorded seven catches for 43 yards with four tackles and a forced fumble in his AFL debut against the Utah Blaze. He scored his first career AFL touchdown on a 51-yard interception return, the second longest return in franchise history, and added his first career touchdown reception, along with a forced fumble and two tackles to win the Ironman of the Game at the Grand Rapids Rampage. Floyd is credited with three tackles and a forced fumble that resulted in a safety, at the Tampa Bay Storm, after missing the previous three games. He had a 2-yard touchdown on his first career rush attempt against the Gladiators. Floyd recorded his second interception of the season, against the Crush. He recorded his third interception of the year against the Columbus Destroyers. Floyd played in both postseason games. He had 10 receptions for 116 yards and a touchdown with 4.5 tackles and a forced fumble against the Chicago Rush.

In 2007, Floyd started all 16 games at defensive back. He was second on the team with six interceptions, third with 16 passes defensed and fourth with 56.0 tackles. He was the first player with two multi-interception games in the same season since Clevan Thomas in 2003. Floyd moved into seventh place on team's career interception list with nine. He tied for 10th in the league with 22 passes defensed. Floyd recorded his 100th career tackle. He had his second career interception return touchdown, 46 yards, along with a career-high seven tackles against the Storm. Floyd had the first two passes defensed of his career against the Crush. He registered his 55th career solo tackle, against the New Orleans VooDoo. Floyd made his second interception of the season, fifth career, against the Blaze. He had his first career two-interception game, against the Gladiators, to become the 12th player in franchise history with a multi-interception game. Floyd had his second two-interception game and moved into seventh on the franchise's career list with nine, also returned an onside kick 10-yards for a touchdown, at the Nashville Kats, his fifth career touchdown. He established a new career-high with three passes defensed against the Arizona Rattlers. Floyd matched his career-best with three passes defended at the Gladiators. In the 2007 postseason, he started all three games at defensive back. Floyd tied a team playoff record with two interceptions against the Rush. He had seven tackles and a playoff career-high tying two passes defensed in ArenaBowl XXI against the Destroyers.

On August 14, 2007, Floyd was re-signed by the SaberCats.

During the week one loss of the, Floyd recorded three tackles, one tackle for loss. During the week two win over the Rampage, Floyd had one missed field goal return for a loss of six yards, three 3.5 tackles. He also recovered an onside kick at the 11-yard line and returned it eight yards. During the week three win over the Rattlers, he had six tackles, one interception returned 43 yards. During the week four loss to the Dallas Desperados, Floyd had, 5.5 tackles, on kick return for no yards, he was also involved in a helmet-to-helmet collision, that resulted in Desperados Wide receiver / defensive back Will Pettis receiving a concussion. During the week five win over the Brigade, Floyd had one tackle, and one interception for no yards.

=== Seattle Seahawks ===
On August 12, 2008, Floyd was signed by the Seattle Seahawks. On August 30, he was waived by the team during final cuts and was later re-signed to the team's practice squad. On September 5, 2009, he was released during final cuts.

=== Cleveland Browns ===
On September 6, 2009, Floyd was claimed off of waivers and signed to the active roster. He was waived on September 22. He was signed back onto the Cleveland Browns practice squad on September 24, after the team waived practice squad receiver Lance Leggett.

=== Dallas Cowboys ===
On November 30, 2009, Floyd was signed to the Dallas Cowboys' practice squad. On January 18, 2010, Floyd signed a future contract with Dallas. He was waived on June 22.

=== Arizona Rattlers ===
In 2011, Floyd signed with the Arizona Rattlers. Floyd has been a part of the Rattlers back-to-back-to-back ArenaBowl Championships in 2012, 2013 and 2014. On June 21, 2016, Floyd was placed on recallable reassignment.
