= Monroe, Georgia =

- City
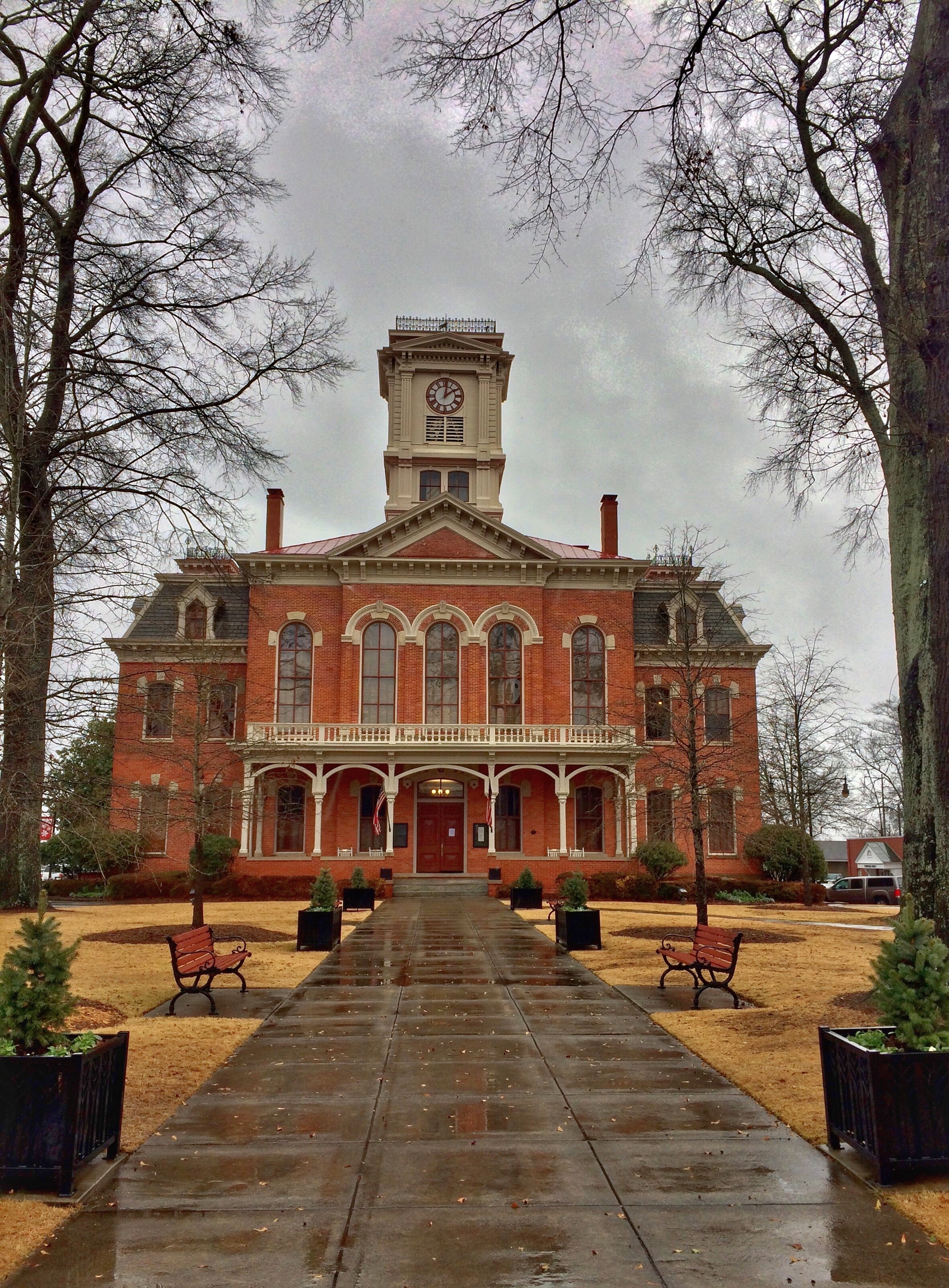
- Walton County Courthouse, Monroe GA

- Flag Logo
- Nickname: City of Governors
- Location in Walton County and the state of Georgia

- Location of Monroe in Georgia
- Coordinates: 33°47′36″N 83°42′39″W
- Country: United States
- State: Georgia
- County: Walton
- Founded: 1818; 208 years ago
- Incorporated: 1821; 205 years ago
- Named for: James Monroe

Government
  - Mayor: John Howard

Area
  - Total: 15.86 sq mi (41.08 km^{2})
  - Land: 15.65 sq mi (40.53 km^{2})
  - Water: 0.21 sq mi (0.55 km^{2})
- Elevation: 909 ft (277 m)

Population (2020)
  - Total: 14,928
  - Density: 953.9/sq mi (368.31/km^{2})
- Time zone: UTC-5 (Eastern (EST))
  - Summer (DST): UTC-4 (EDT)
- ZIP codes: 30655-30656
- Area code: 470/678/770
- FIPS code: 13-52192
- GNIS feature ID: 0356398
- Website: www.monroega.com

Monroe is a city in and the county seat of Walton County, Georgia, United States. It is located both one hour east of Atlanta via US 78 and GA 138 to I-20 and east of Hartsfield–Jackson International Airport and is one of the exurban cities in the Atlanta metropolitan area. The population was 14,928 at the 2020 U.S. census.

== History ==
Monroe was founded in 1818 as seat of the newly formed Walton County. It was incorporated as a town in 1821 and as a city in 1896. It is named after James Monroe.

Monroe was a major cotton producer in the state during the 1900s. The two main cotton mills in Monroe used to be the driving economic force in the region. Now the mills no longer produce for the cotton industry, but rather serve as economic engines for the region by housing antique markets, event space, and other unique retail.

In July 1946, the area was the site of the last mass lynching in the United States. A White mob attacked and killed two Black married couples who were driving through the area. The four people were pulled from their car and shot several times.

A Civil War memorial, in the form of a statue of a Confederate soldier, stands adjacent to the county courthouse in downtown Monroe.

== Geography ==
Monroe is in the center of Walton County. U.S. Route 78 (Atlanta/Monroe Bypass) passes north of the city, leading west 5 miles (8.0 km) to Loganville, and west 35 miles (56 km) to downtown Atlanta, and east 25 miles to Athens. GA Bus. 10 runs through the city of Monroe. Georgia State Route 11 leads northwest from Monroe 15 miles to Winder, the Barrow County seat, and south 10 miles to Social Circle, and southwest 15 miles (24 km) to eastern rural Newton County, east of Covington. State Route 138 leads south 18 miles (29 km) to Conyers.

Monroe is located at 33°47′36″N 83°42′39″W (33.793295, -83.710790).

According to the United States Census Bureau, the city has a total area of 10.5 square miles (27 km^{2}), of which 10.4 square miles (27 km^{2}) is land and 0.1 square miles (0.26 km^{2}) (1.05%) is water.

== Demographics ==
Historical population
Census	Pop.	Note	%±
1870	438		—
1880	530		21.0%
1890	983		85.5%
1900	1,846		87.8%
1910	3,029		64.1%
1920	3,211		6.0%
1930	3,706		15.4%
1940	4,168		12.5%
1950	4,542		9.0%
1960	6,826		50.3%
1970	8,071		18.2%
1980	8,854		9.7%
1990	9,759		10.2%
2000	11,407		16.9%
2010	13,234		16.0%
2020	14,928		12.8%
2025 (est.)	16,507	▲	10.6%
U.S. Decennial Census; 2025

=== 2020 census ===
As of the 2020 census, Monroe had a population of 14,928. The median age was 35.1 years. 26.5% of residents were under the age of 18 and 14.9% of residents were 65 years of age or older. For every 100 females there were 83.8 males, and for every 100 females age 18 and over there were 77.8 males age 18 and over.

96.3% of residents lived in urban areas, while 3.7% lived in rural areas.

There were 5,723 households in Monroe, of which 35.7% had children under the age of 18 living in them. Of all households, 31.2% were married-couple households, 17.8% were households with a male householder and no spouse or partner present, and 43.6% were households with a female householder and no spouse or partner present. About 30.9% of all households were made up of individuals and 14.7% had someone living alone who was 65 years of age or older. There were 3,223 families in the city.

There were 6,130 housing units, of which 6.6% were vacant. The homeowner vacancy rate was 2.2% and the rental vacancy rate was 5.1%.

Monroe racial composition as of 2020
Race	Num.	Perc.
White (non-Hispanic)	7,267	48.68%
Black or African American (non-Hispanic)	6,068	40.65%
Native American	40	0.27%
Asian	156	1.05%
Pacific Islander	5	0.03%
Other/Mixed	688	4.61%
Hispanic or Latino	704	4.72%

== Economy ==
The east end of Monroe contains multiple industries:

- Hitachi automotive systems of America
- Tucker Door and Trim
- Arkansas-headquartered Wal-Mart Stores, Inc.'s southeast Walmart Distribution Center
- Leggett & Platt Corporation

== Education ==
=== Walton County School District ===
The Walton County School District holds pre-school to grade twelve, and consists of nine elementary schools, three middle schools, and four high schools. The district has 675 full-time teachers and over 10,368 students.

=== Public schools ===
==== Elementary ====
- Atha Road Elementary School
- Bay Creek Elementary School
- Harmony Elementary School
- Monroe Elementary School
- Walker Park Elementary School
- Walnut Grove Elementary School
- Sharon Elementary School
- Loganville Elementary School
- Youth Elementary School

==== Middle ====
- Carver Middle School
- Loganville Middle School
- Youth Middle School

==== High ====
- Monroe Area High School
- Loganville High School
- Walnut Grove High School
- Social Circle High School

==== Private ====
- George Walton Academy
- Loganville Christian Academy
- Monroe Country Day School

=== Monroe Museum ===
The Monroe Museum is a history museum that details a timeline of Monroe, starting with the Native Americans that lived in the area, and ending with the present.

== Transportation ==
Through Highways

SR 11

SR 83

SR 10

US 78

SR 10 Business

SR 138

Nearby Highways

SR 83 Connector

== Notable people ==
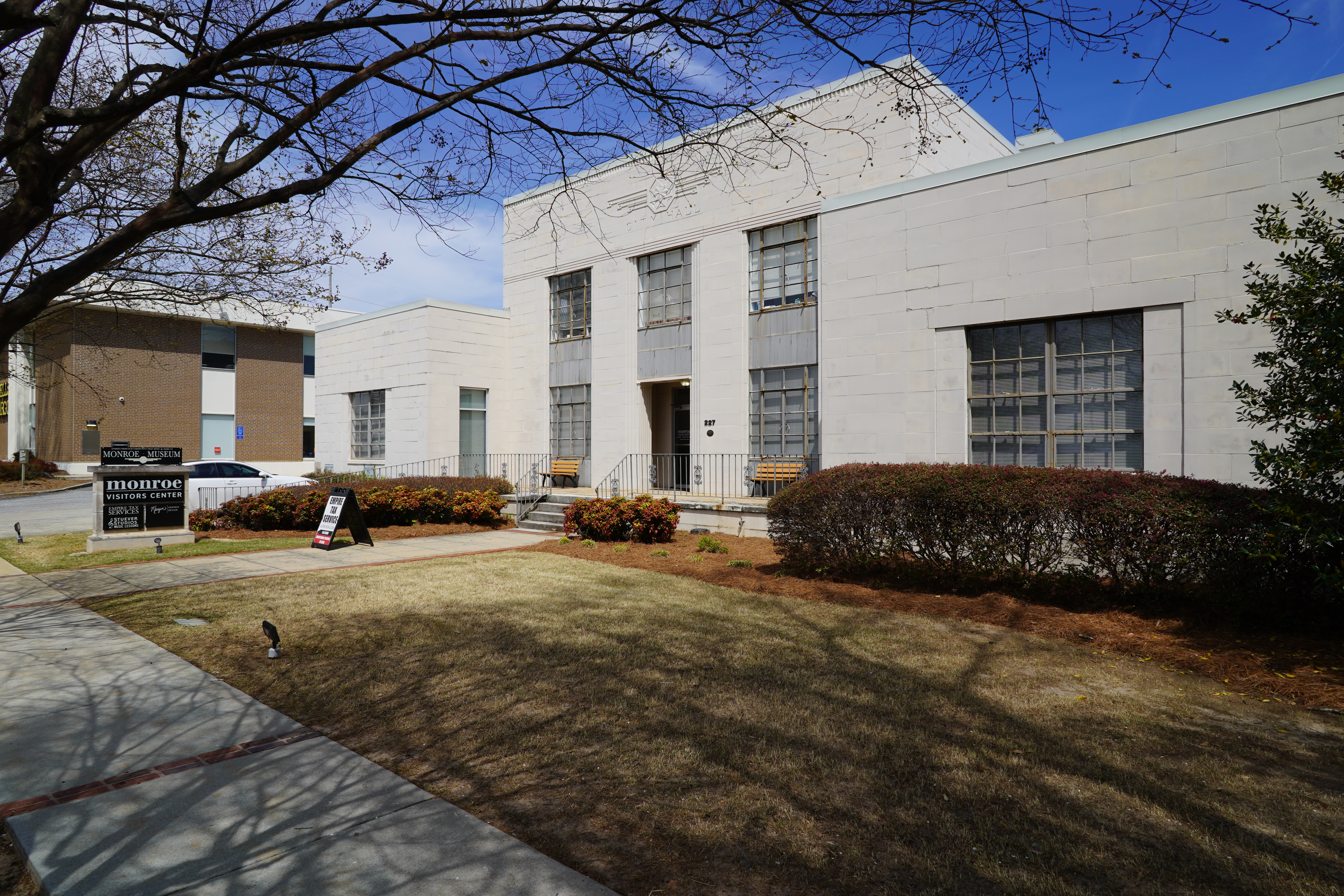
Monroe City Hall

- Javianne Oliver - 2020 Olympic Silver Medalist
- Alfred H. Colquitt - Governor of Georgia and senator who served as Confederate officer
- Frances Conroy - Golden Globe- and SAG Award-winning actress
- Besse Cooper - suffragist, teacher, and World's Oldest Living Person 2011-2012
- Henry Fambrough - baritone singer, The Spinners
- Marquis Floyd - NFL player
- Michael Gallup - Dallas Cowboys wide receiver
- Lonnie Hillyer - jazz trumpeter
- Tyler Hubbard - country music singer/songwriter, member of band Florida Georgia Line
- Henry Dickerson McDaniel - Governor of Georgia from 1883 to 1886
- Prince Hulon Preston, Jr. - member of US House of Representatives
- Patricia Roberts - Olympic silver medalist and Women's Basketball Hall of Fame inductee
- Stephon Tuitt - NFL player for Pittsburgh Steelers
- Clifford Walker - Governor of Georgia from 1923 to 1927
- Bruce Williamson (born 1954) - Politician. Member of Georgia House of Representatives.
