= Monroe Area High School =

Public school in Walton County, Georgia, United States

Location
- 300 Double Springs Church Road; Monroe, Walton County, Georgia 30656; United States; 33°49′07″N 83°44′11″W

Information
- Type: Public
- School district: Walton County School District
- NCES School ID: 130539001772
- Principal: Bryan Hicks
- Teaching staff: 74.20 (on an FTE basis)
- Grades: 9–12
- Enrollment: 1,205 (2023–2024)
- Student to teacher ratio: 16.24
- Colors: Purple, white and black
- Team name: Hurricanes
- Website: mahs.walton.k12.ga.us

Monroe Area High School is located in Walton County, Georgia, United States. It serves the city of Monroe. It is a part of the Walton County School District.

== The school ==
Monroe Area High School is a public, four-year comprehensive high school for grades nine through twelve.

The present campus was constructed in 2005, and includes a football stadium (the Purple Pit) with a nine-lane rubberized track, baseball and softball fields, tennis courts, and a practice field for football and soccer. The current facility replaced the former campus a few miles away.

The old Monroe Area High School building (currently home to the Walton County satellite campus of Athens Technical College), its football stadium, and the Monroe Area football team were used during filming of the TV series The Vampire Diaries.

== Demographics ==
The demographic breakdown of the 1,102 students enrolled in 2012-2013 was:

- Male - 50.0%
- Female - 50.0%
- Native American/Alaskan - 0.3%
- Asian/Pacific Islanders - 3.1%
- Black - 32.3%
- Hispanic - 4.8%
- White - 56.5%
- Multiracial - 3.0%

62.1% of the students were eligible for free or reduced lunch.

== Sports ==
Monroe Area is home to the Purple Hurricanes and competes in region 8-AAA of the Georgia High School Association. The school offers the following sports:

- Baseball
- Basketball (boys' and girls')
- Cheerleading
- Color guard
- Cross country (boys' and girls')
- Dance team
- Football
- Golf (boys' and girls')
- Majorettes
- Soccer (boys' and girls')
- Softball
- Swimming (boys' and girls')
- Tennis (boys' and girls')
- Track and field (boys' and girls')
- Volleyball
- Wrestling

In 2012 the girls' track team won the State Championship for 8-AAA.

== Notable alumni ==
- Marquis Floyd - former NFL and AFL player
- Michael Gallup - American football player, Dallas Cowboys
- Javianne Oliver - Sprinter, 2021 Tokyo Olympics
- Patricia Roberts, basketball player, coach
- Stephon Tuitt, Former NFL player, Pittsburgh Steelers
