= Monroe Museum =

Local history museum in Monroe, Georgia

Coordinates: 33°47′34″N 83°42′45″W

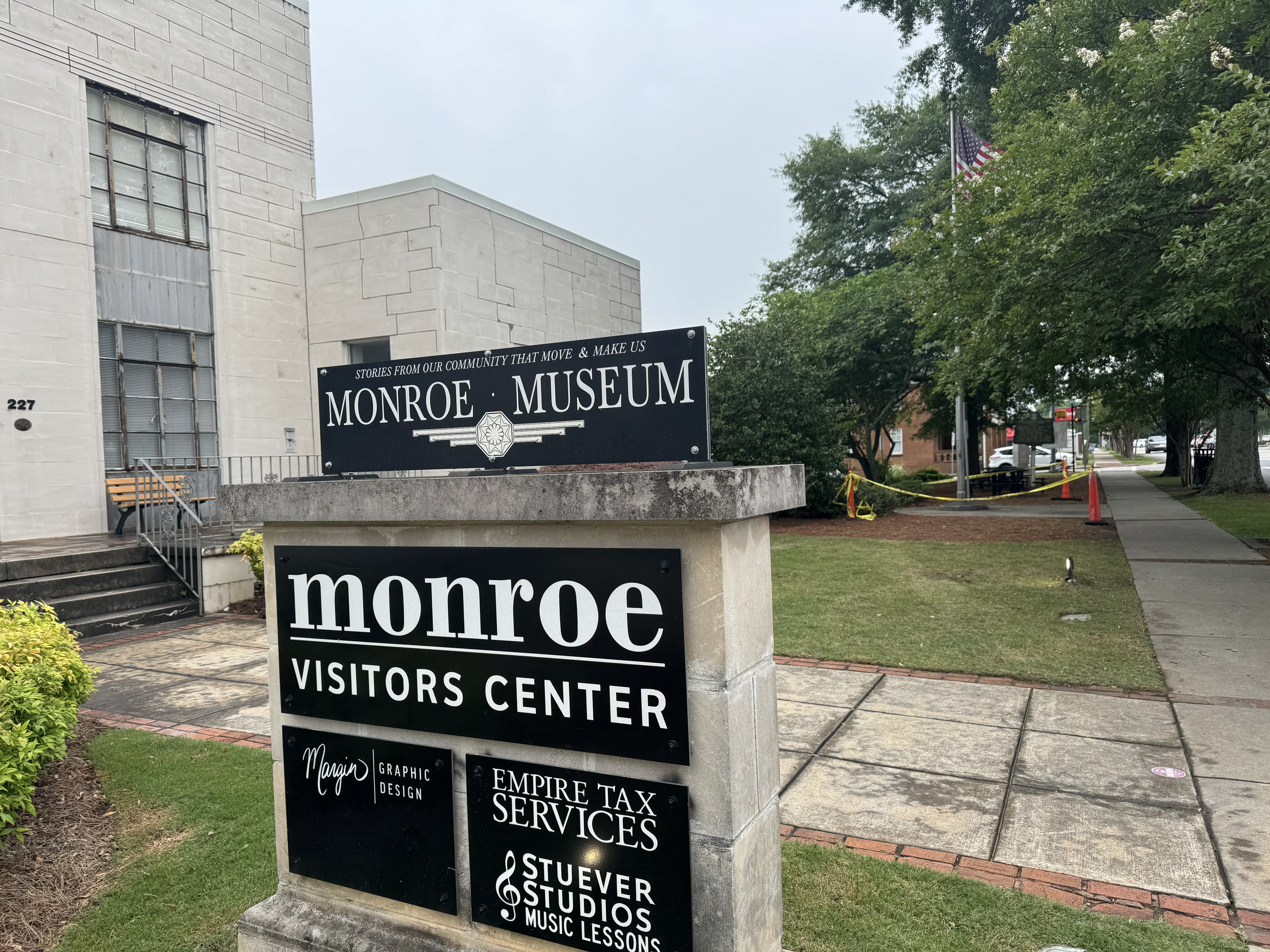
- Established: 2015
- Location: Monroe, Georgia
- Type: History museum
- Historian: Steve Brown
- Website: monroegamuseum.org

The Monroe Museum is a history museum in Monroe, Georgia. The museum was created by a volunteer committee of Monroe residents and generous support from the community in 2015. It details a timeline of Monroe, starting with the Native Americans that lived in the area, and ending with the present.
