= Stephon Tuitt =

American football player (born 1993)

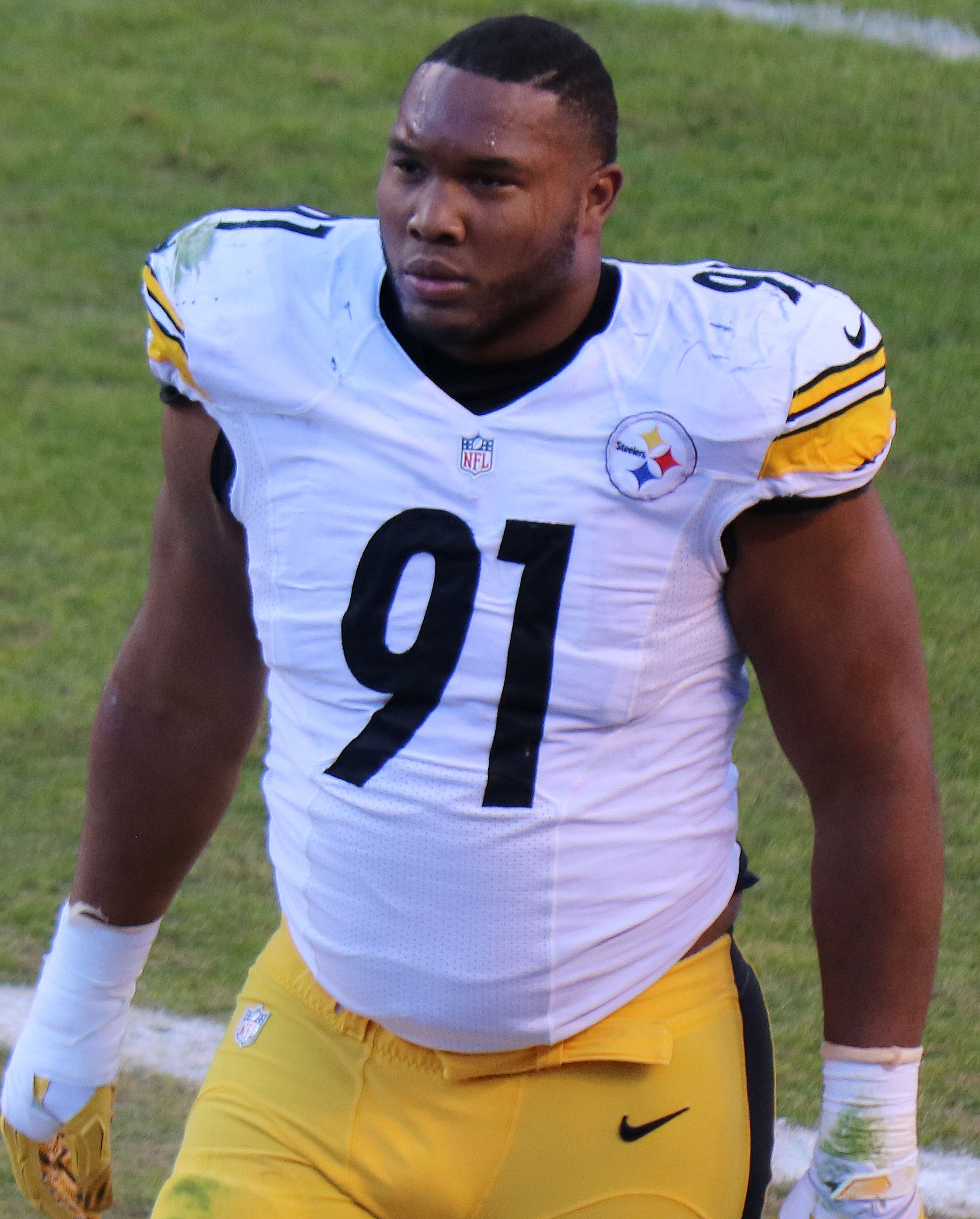
- Tuitt with the Pittsburgh Steelers in 2015

No. 91
- Position: Defensive end

Personal information
- Born: May 23, 1993 (age 33); Miami, Florida, U.S.
- Listed height: 6 ft 6 in (1.98 m)
- Listed weight: 303 lb (137 kg)

Career information
- High school: Monroe Area (Monroe, Georgia)
- College: Notre Dame (2011–2013)
- NFL draft: 2014: 2nd round, 46th overall pick

Career history
- Pittsburgh Steelers (2014–2021)

Awards and highlights
- Second-team All-American (2012)

Career NFL statistics
- Total tackles: 246
- Sacks: 34.5
- Forced fumbles: 6
- Fumble recoveries: 1
- Interceptions: 1
- Pass deflections: 13
- Stats at Pro Football Reference

Stephon Jakiel Tuitt (born May 23, 1993) is an American former professional football player who was a defensive end for eight seasons with the Pittsburgh Steelers of the National Football League (NFL). He played college football for the Notre Dame Fighting Irish and was selected by the Steelers in the second round of the 2014 NFL draft.

== Early life ==
Tuitt attended Monroe Area High School in Monroe, Georgia. As a junior, he recorded 56 tackles, 24 for loss, including 10 sacks and four forced fumbles. In 2010, as a senior, he led Monroe Area to an 11–2 record and third-round appearance in the Georgia Class AAA state playoffs, after Monroe Area had finished a combined 0–20 the previous two seasons. His efforts led to him being selected to play in the U.S. Army All-American Bowl in San Antonio, Texas.

Rated as a five-star recruit by Rivals.com, he was rated as the 2nd best strongside defensive end in the nation, he accepted a scholarship offer from Notre Dame over offers from Georgia Tech and Georgia.

== College career ==
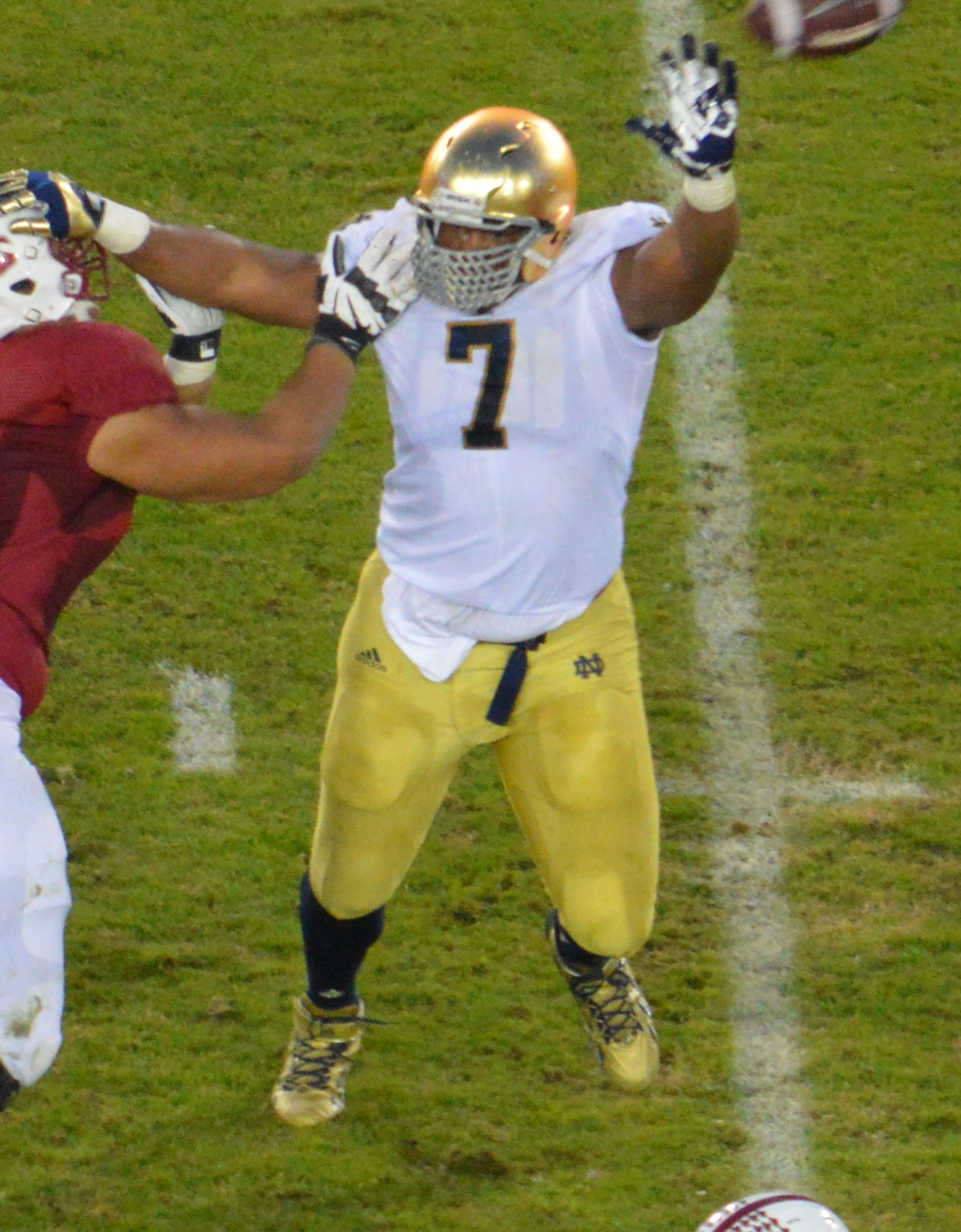
Tuitt during his tenure with Notre Dame in 2013

As a freshman, Tuitt began his collegiate career by playing in 9 games, 3 in which he started. He recorded 30 tackles, including 3 for loss, and two sacks to go along with five quarterback hurries. He received Third-Team Freshman All-America honors by Phil Steele.

In his sophomore season, Tuitt earned a starting position and recorded 42 tackles, including 13 for loss, 12 sacks, 9 quarterback hurries, and 3 forced fumbles. He also returned a 77-yard fumble for a touchdown against Navy. Tuitt earned second team All-American honors by the Associated Press. As a junior in 2013, after dealing with the effects from off-season hernia surgery, he totaled 49 tackles, including 9 for a loss, 7.5 sacks, a forced fumble, and an interception return for a touchdown against Michigan. At the end of the season, Tuitt was named a first team All-American by Sports Illustrated, Athlon ESPN.com, and CBS Sports, in addition to a variety of other honors.

On January 5, 2014, Tuitt announced he would forgo his remaining eligibility and enter the 2014 NFL draft.

== Professional career ==
=== Pre-draft ===
Coming out of Notre Dame, Tuitt was projected by the majority of analysts to be a first or second-round pick. He was invited to the NFL Scouting Combine but was able only to perform the bench press due to a foot injury. Scouts were conflicted as to whether Tuitt was more apt to be a defensive tackle or a defensive end in the NFL. On March 14, 2014, Tuitt attended Notre Dame's pro day and performed for 59 team representatives and scouts from all 32 teams. Jacksonville Jaguars head coach Gus Bradley and Pittsburgh Steelers head coach Mike Tomlin were the only coaches who attended. Tomlin flew to South Bend specifically to meet with Tuitt, although he was unable to perform physically after having surgery on his foot the previous week. He was ranked as the second best defensive end prospect in the draft by NFL analyst Mike Mayock, was ranked the fourth best defensive tackle prospect by NFLDraftScout.com, and the sixth best defensive tackle by Sports Illustrated.

Pre-draft measurables
Height	Weight	Arm length	Hand span	Wingspan	Bench press
6 ft 5 1/2 in (1.97 m)	304 lb (138 kg)	34 3/4 in (0.88 m)	10 in (0.25 m)	6 ft 10 5/8 in (2.10 m)	31 reps
All values from NFL Combine

=== 2014 ===
The Steelers drafted Tuitt in the second round (46th overall) of the 2014 NFL draft. On June 18, 2014, the Steelers signed him to a four-year, $4.60 million contract with $2.72 million guaranteed and a signing bonus of $1.67 million.

He entered training camp his rookie year, competing with Cameron Heyward, Brett Kiesel, and Cam Thomas for a starting defensive end position. To begin the regular season, he was named the backup weakside defensive end behind Heyward.

He made his professional regular season debut in the Steelers' season-opener against the Cleveland Browns. The next game, he recorded his first career tackle in the Steelers' 26–6 loss to the Baltimore Ravens. On December 7, 2014, he made his first career start against the Cincinnati Bengals and finished the 42–21 victory with two combined tackles. In Week 16, Tuitt collected a season-high three solo tackles and made his first career sack on Kansas City Chiefs quarterback Alex Smith. He also forced a fumble from Chiefs' running back Jamaal Charles and helped the Steelers defeat the Chiefs, 20–12. He finished his rookie season with 19 combined tackles, one sack, one forced fumble, and a fumble recovery while appearing in all 16 regular season games and starting four of them. He received an overall grade of 43.0 from Pro Football Focus (PFF) in 2014.

The Steelers finished the season with an 11–5 record to clinch an AFC North pennant. On January 3, 2015, he appeared in his first career playoff game and made two solo tackles as the Steelers lost, 30–17, in the AFC Wildcard game to the Ravens.

=== 2015 ===
Tuitt entered training camp competing for the vacant starting defensive end position left by the retirement of Brett Kiesel. He was named a starting defensive end to begin the season, after beating out teammates Cam Thomas, Leterrius Walton, Clifton Geathers, Caushaud Lyons, and Joe Kruger.

He started the season opener against the New England Patriots and assisted on one tackle during the 21–28 loss. The next game, Tuitt made four combined tackles and 1.5 sacks on San Francisco 49ers quarterback Colin Kaepernick, helping the Steelers win, 43–18. On September 27, 2015, he collected seven combined tackles and a sack on St. Louis Rams quarterback Nick Foles. The following week, Tuitt made a career-high ten solo tackles and sacked Ravens' quarterback Joe Flacco during the Steelers' 20–23 loss. During a Week 14 matchup against the Bengals, Tuitt recorded his first career interception off a shovel pass from quarterback Andy Dalton. In the last game of the season, a victory over the Browns, he racked up four total tackles and a season-high two sacks on Brown's quarterback Austin Davis. Pro Football Focus gave Tuitt an overall grade of 80.4 in 2015.

He finished his second season with 54 tackles, 6.5 sacks, one interception, and one pass defended while appearing in 14 regular season games and starting all of them. The Steelers finished the season with a 10–6 record and advanced to the playoffs. In the AFC Wildcard game, Tuitt recorded three combined tackles, as the Steelers defeated the Bengals, 18–16. The following week, the Steelers lost to the eventual Super Bowl 50 champions, the Denver Broncos. In the 16–23 loss, Tuitt collected four combined tackles.

=== 2016 ===
Tuitt returned as the Steelers' starting defensive end to begin the 2016 regular season. In the Steelers' 38–16 season-opening defeat of the Washington Redskins, Tuitt only made one tackle throughout the game. On September 25, 2016, he collected five solo tackles, as the Steelers were defeated by the Philadelphia Eagles, 3–34. On November 13, 2016, Tuitt racked up three combined tackles and sacked Dallas Cowboys quarterback Dak Prescott for his first of the season, as the Steelers lost, 35–30. The next game, Tuitt helped the Steelers win, 24–9, after finishing the game with five combined tackles and a season-high two sacks on Browns' quarterback Josh McCown. He was voted AFC Defensive Player of the week for his performance over Cleveland.

During a Week 15 matchup against the Bengals]l, Tuitt left the game after suffering a knee injury on the first drive and missed the next two games. Tuitt received an overall grade of 82.0 from Pro Football Focus and was ranked 21st among all qualified interior defensive linemen in 2016.

He finished the regular season with 37 combined tackles (29 solo), four sacks, and three pass deflections in 14 games and 14 starts. The Steelers finished first in the AFC North with an 11–5 record. On January 8, 2017, Tuitt recorded four combined tackles in a 30–12 AFC Wildcard game victory over the Miami Dolphins.

=== 2017 ===
On September 9, 2017, the Steelers signed Tuitt to a five-year, $60 million contract extension with an $11 million signing bonus and $13 million guaranteed.

Tuitt and Cameron Heyward returned as the Steelers' starting defensive end duo to begin the regular season. He started the Steelers' season-opening 21–18 victory over the Browns, but left after suffering an injury on the second play of the game and finished with only one tackle. The injury was confirmed to be a tear to his biceps that kept him from playing in Weeks 2–3. After returning for two games, Tuitt then suffered a back injury that kept him out of Weeks 7–8. In Week 17, he collected a season-high five combined tackles during a 28–24 win against the Browns. He finished the season with 25 combined tackles (19 solo), three sacks, and two pass deflections in 12 games and 12 starts. Pro Football Focus gave Tuitt an overall grade of 86.1, which ranked him 18th among all interior defensive linemen in 2017.

=== 2018 ===
In week 8 against the Browns, Tuitt recorded 7 tackles, 1 sack, and 1 pass defended as the Steelers won 33–18. In week 10 against the Carolina Panthers, Tuitt hyper extended his elbow and missed the next two games against the Jaguars and Broncos. He made his return in week 13 against the Los Angeles Chargers. Tuitt finished the season with 45 tackles, 5.5 sacks, and 4 passes defended. He received an overall grade of 81.8 from Pro Football Focus in 2018, which ranked as the 21st highest grade among all qualifying interior defenders.

=== 2019 ===
In Week 2 against the Seattle Seahawks, Tuitt sacked Russell Wilson 2.5 times as the Steelers lost 28–26. In Week 3 against the 49ers, Tuitt recorded a sack on Jimmy Garoppolo in the 24–20 loss. On October 15, 2019, he was placed on injured reserve after suffering a torn pec in a Week 6 game against the Chargers.

=== 2020 ===
Tuitt made his return from injury in Week 1 against the New York Giants on Monday Night Football. During the game, Tuitt recorded his first sack of the season on Daniel Jones in the 26–16 win. In Week 5 against the Eagles, Tuitt recorded 1.5 sacks on Carson Wentz during the 38–29 win. Tuitt's 3.5 sacks during the first four games of the 2020 season tied his previous season's total. In Week 8 against the Ravens, Tuitt recorded nine tackles and two sacks on Lamar Jackson during the 28–24 win. On November 4, 2020, Tuitt was named the AFC Defensive Player of the Week for his performance in Week 8. In Week 11 against the Jaguars Tuitt recorded his seventh sack (single season career high) of the season on Jake Luton during the 27–3 win. He was placed on the reserve/COVID-19 list by the team on November 27, 2020, and activated on December 5. In Week 16 against the Indianapolis Colts, Tuitt recorded his tenth sack of the season on Philip Rivers during the 28–24 win. He finished the season with a career high 11 sacks, as well as 45 tackles and 2 forced fumbles.

=== 2021 ===
On September 1, 2021, Tuitt was placed on injured reserve to start the season. While coping with the death of his brother and dealing with a lingering knee injury, he did not play in a single game during the 2021 season

=== 2022 ===
On June 1, 2022, Tuitt announced his retirement from professional football.

== Career statistics ==
=== NFL ===
Year	Team	GP	COMB	TOTAL	AST	SACK	FF	FR	FR YDS	INT	IR YDS	AVG IR	LNG	TD	PD
2014	PIT	16	19	13	6	1.0	1	0	0	0	0	0	0	0	0
2015	PIT	14	54	39	15	6.5	0	0	0	1	3	3	3	0	1
2016	PIT	14	37	28	9	4.0	2	0	0	0	0	0	0	0	3
2017	PIT	12	25	19	6	3.0	1	0	0	0	0	0	0	0	2
2018	PIT	14	45	27	18	5.5	0	0	0	0	0	0	0	0	4
2019	PIT	6	22	18	4	3.5	0	0	0	0	0	0	0	0	0
2020	PIT	15	45	33	12	11.0	2	0	0	0	0	0	0	0	3
Career		91	245	175	70	34.5	6	0	0	1	3	3	3	0	13

=== College ===
Year	Team	Games	Tackles				Sacks	Pass Defense				Fumbles		Blkd	
Year	Team	Games	Solo	Ast	Total	TFL – Yds	No – Yds	Int – Yds	BU	PD	Qbh	Rcv – Yds	FF	Kick	Saf
2011	Notre Dame	9	11	19	30	3.0 – 21	2.0 – 18	0 – 0	1	1	5	0 – 0	0	0	0
2012	Notre Dame	13	24	23	47	13.0 – 93	12.0 – 89	0 – 0	1	1	9	1 – 77	3	1	0
2013	Notre Dame	13	24	25	49	9.0 – 62	7.5 – 56	1 – 0	2	3	13	0 – 0	1	0	0
Career		35	59	68	127	25.0 – 176	21.5 – 163	1 – 0	4	5	27	1 – 77	4	1	0

== Personal life ==
On June 2, 2021, Tuitt's younger brother, Richard Bartlett III, was killed in a hit and run in Johns Creek, Georgia. Another younger brother, Jared Bartlett, plays in the NFL for the Arizona Cardinals.
