= Monroe City Hall (Monroe, Georgia) =

- U.S. National Register of Historic Places
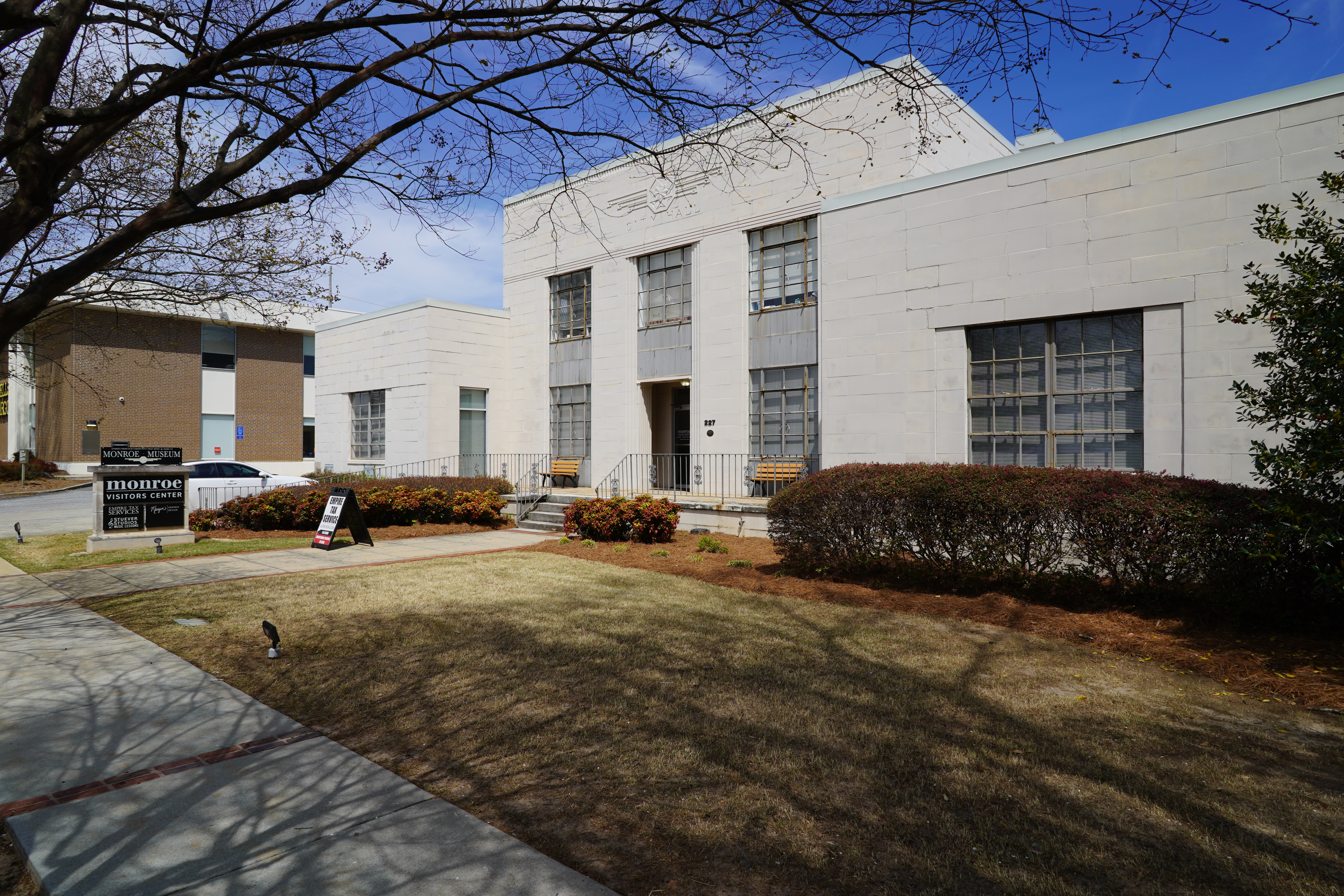
- Monroe City Hall

- Location within Georgia
- Location: 227 S. Broad St., Monroe, Georgia
- Coordinates: 33°47′33″N 83°42′45″W
- Area: less than one acre
- Built: 1939
- Built by: Daniel & Beutell; Davis, John K., & Son
- Architectural style: Art Deco
- MPS: Monroe MRA
- NRHP reference No.: 83003618
- Added to NRHP: December 28, 1983

The Monroe City Hall in Monroe, Georgia was built in 1939. It was listed on the National Register of Historic Places in 1983.

It was designed by architects Daniel & Beutell in Art Deco style, and was built by John K. Davis & Son.
