= Michael Gallup =

American football player (born 1996)

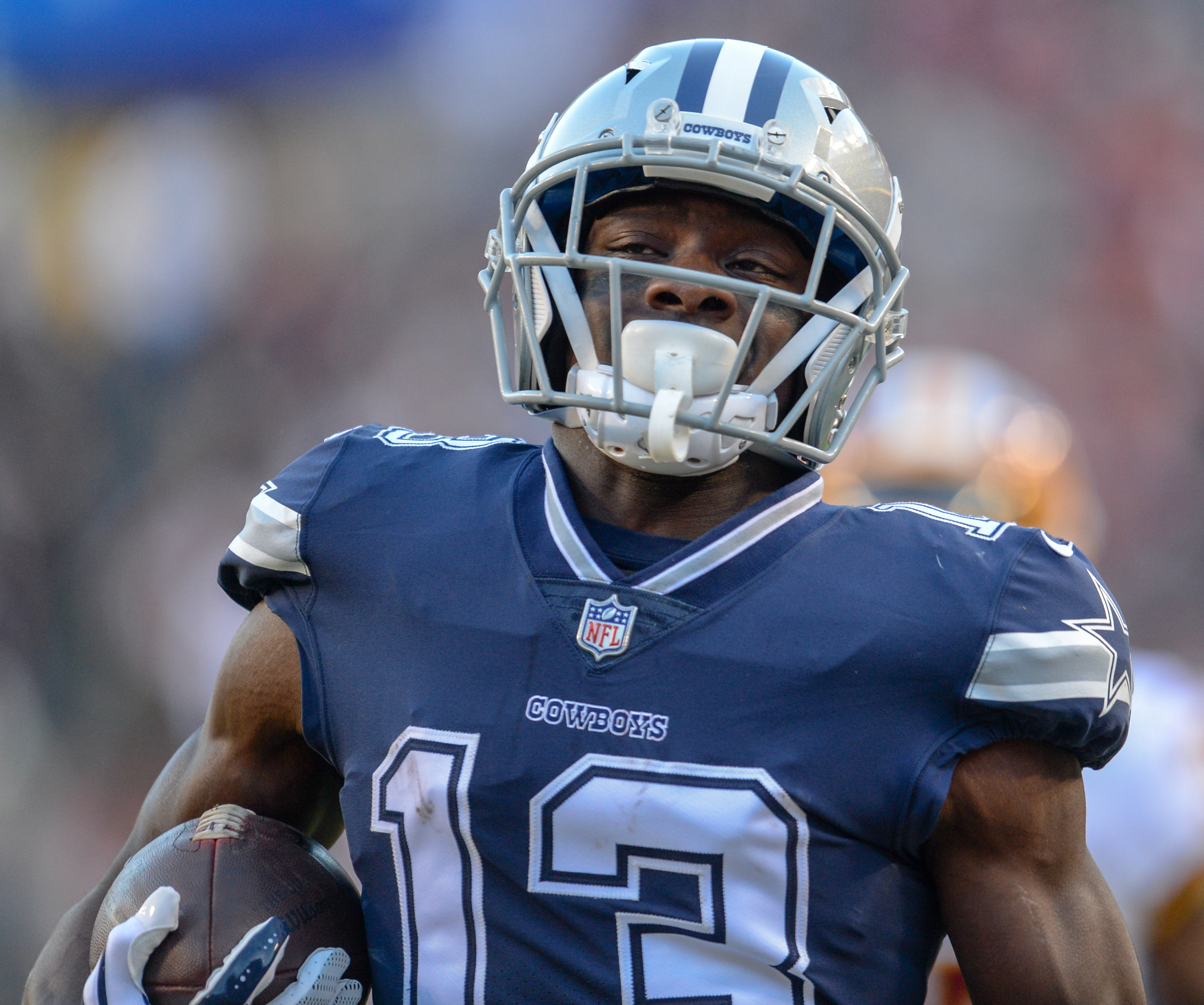
- Gallup with the Dallas Cowboys in 2018

Profile
- Position: Wide receiver

Personal information
- Born: March 4, 1996 (age 30); Atlanta, Georgia, U.S.
- Listed height: 6 ft 1 in (1.85 m)
- Listed weight: 198 lb (90 kg)

Career information
- High school: Monroe Area (Monroe, Georgia)
- College: Butler (2014–2015); Colorado State (2016–2017)
- NFL draft: 2018: 3rd round, 81st overall pick

Career history
- Dallas Cowboys (2018–2023); Las Vegas Raiders (2024)*; Washington Commanders (2025)*
- * Offseason or practice squad member only

Awards and highlights
- Consensus All-American (2017); 2× All-Mountain West (2016, 2017)

Career NFL statistics as of 2024
- Receptions: 266
- Receiving yards: 3,744
- Receiving touchdowns: 21
- Stats at Pro Football Reference

Michael Gallup (born March 4, 1996) is an American professional football wide receiver. He played college football for the Butler Grizzlies and Colorado State Rams, where he was a consensus All-American in 2017. Gallup was drafted by the Dallas Cowboys in the third round of the 2018 NFL draft. He has also been a member of the Las Vegas Raiders and Washington Commanders.

== Early life ==
Gallup attended Monroe Area High School in Monroe, Georgia, where he played football, baseball, basketball, and ran track. Gallup started focusing on football as a junior, playing quarterback in a triple option offense.

As a senior, Gallup played wide receiver and running back, registering 28 receptions for 637 yards (22.8-yard average) and 10 touchdowns to go along with 37 carries for 484 yards (13.1-yard average) and seven touchdowns. He helped his team advance to the second round of the Class 4A playoffs.

== College career ==
Gallup enrolled at Butler Community College to improve his grades. As a freshman in 2014, Gallup led the team with 780 receiving yards and 11 touchdowns. Against Dodge City Community College, he had five receptions for 287 yards and three touchdowns.

As a sophomore in 2015, Gallup played in only three games due to an ankle injury and had nine receptions for 74 yards and a touchdown.

In 2016, Gallup transferred to Colorado State University. He started slow in his first season, but began to increase his production after his third game against the University of Northern Colorado, when he had four receptions for 82 yards and a touchdown. Gallup played in all 13 games (11 starts), recording 76 receptions for 1,272 yards (tied for first in the conference) and 14 touchdowns.

As a senior in 2017, Gallup was a finalist for the Fred Biletnikoff Award. He started all 13 games, posting 100 receptions (school record) for 1,413 yards and seven touchdowns.

Gallup finished his career with various accomplishments. He had three of the top eight single-game all-time receiving performances in school history, four of the top ten games in school history for receptions, ranked second in single-season receiving touchdowns (14), only player in school history to catch three or more touchdowns three times, record for single-season receptions (100), second-best single-season receiving yards (1,413), ranked fifth in career receptions (176).

== Professional career ==
On November 20, 2017, it was announced that Gallup had accepted his invitation to play in the Senior Bowl. On January 27, 2018, Gallup caught three passes for 60-yards and was part of Denver Broncos head coach Vance Joseph's North team that lost 45–16 to the South coach by Houston Texans head coach Bill O'Brien. He attended the NFL Scouting Combine in Indianapolis and completed all of the combine and positional drills.

On March 7, 2018, Gallup participated at Colorado State's pro day and performed the 40-yard dash (4.45s), 20-yard dash (2.63s), 10-yard dash (1.57s), broad jump (10'8"), short shuttle (4.52s), and three-cone drill (7.09s). At the conclusion of the pre-draft process, Gallup was projected to be a third round pick by NFL draft experts and scouts. He was ranked as the 10th best wide receiver prospect in the draft by DraftScout.com and was ranked the 14th best wide receiver by Scouts Inc.

Pre-draft measurables
Height	Weight	Arm length	Hand span	Wingspan	40-yard dash	10-yard split	20-yard split	20-yard shuttle	Three-cone drill	Vertical jump	Broad jump	Bench press
6 ft 0 3/4 in (1.85 m)	205 lb (93 kg)	31 1/2 in (0.80 m)	9 1/4 in (0.23 m)	6 ft 1 5/8 in (1.87 m)	4.45 s	1.57 s	2.63 s	4.37 s	6.95 s	36 in (0.91 m)	10 ft 8 in (3.25 m)	10 reps
All values from NFL Combine/Pro Day

=== Dallas Cowboys ===
==== 2018 season ====
Gallup was selected by the Dallas Cowboys in the third round (81st overall) of the 2018 NFL draft. He was the ninth wide receiver drafted in 2018. On May 21, 2018, the Cowboys signed Gallup to a four-year, $3.52 million contract that includes a signing bonus of $889,980.

Gallup made his NFL debut in the season-opening 8-16 loss to the Carolina Panthers, catching one pass for nine yards. In Week 6 against the Jacksonville Jaguars, he made the first start of his career over Deonte Thompson, catching one pass for 27 yards in a 40-7 win. In Week 7 against the Washington Redskins, he caught his first NFL touchdown on a 49-yard pass from Dak Prescott and a season-best 81 receiving yards in a 17-20 loss.

After the release of Dez Bryant on April 13, 2018, the Cowboys entered the season using a wide receiver-by-committee approach, but the production was not there and the team record was 3-4. On October 22, 2018, the team traded for Amari Cooper, which helped turn the season around. In Week 13 against the New Orleans Saints, Gallup led the team with 76 yards on 5 receptions in the 13-10 win. He had 2 receptions for 18 yards and an 11-yard touchdown in his postseason debut in the 24-22 Wild Card playoff win against the Seattle Seahawks. He was named the starter in the Divisional playoff game against the Los Angeles Rams, logged the first 100-yard game of his career, while setting Cowboys rookie records in a postseason with a 119 receiving yards and six catches.

Gallup appeared in all 16 regular season games with 8 starts, collecting 33 receptions, 15.36 yards per reception average (led the team), 2 receiving touchdowns and 507 receiving yards (seventh in franchise history for a rookie).

==== 2019 season ====
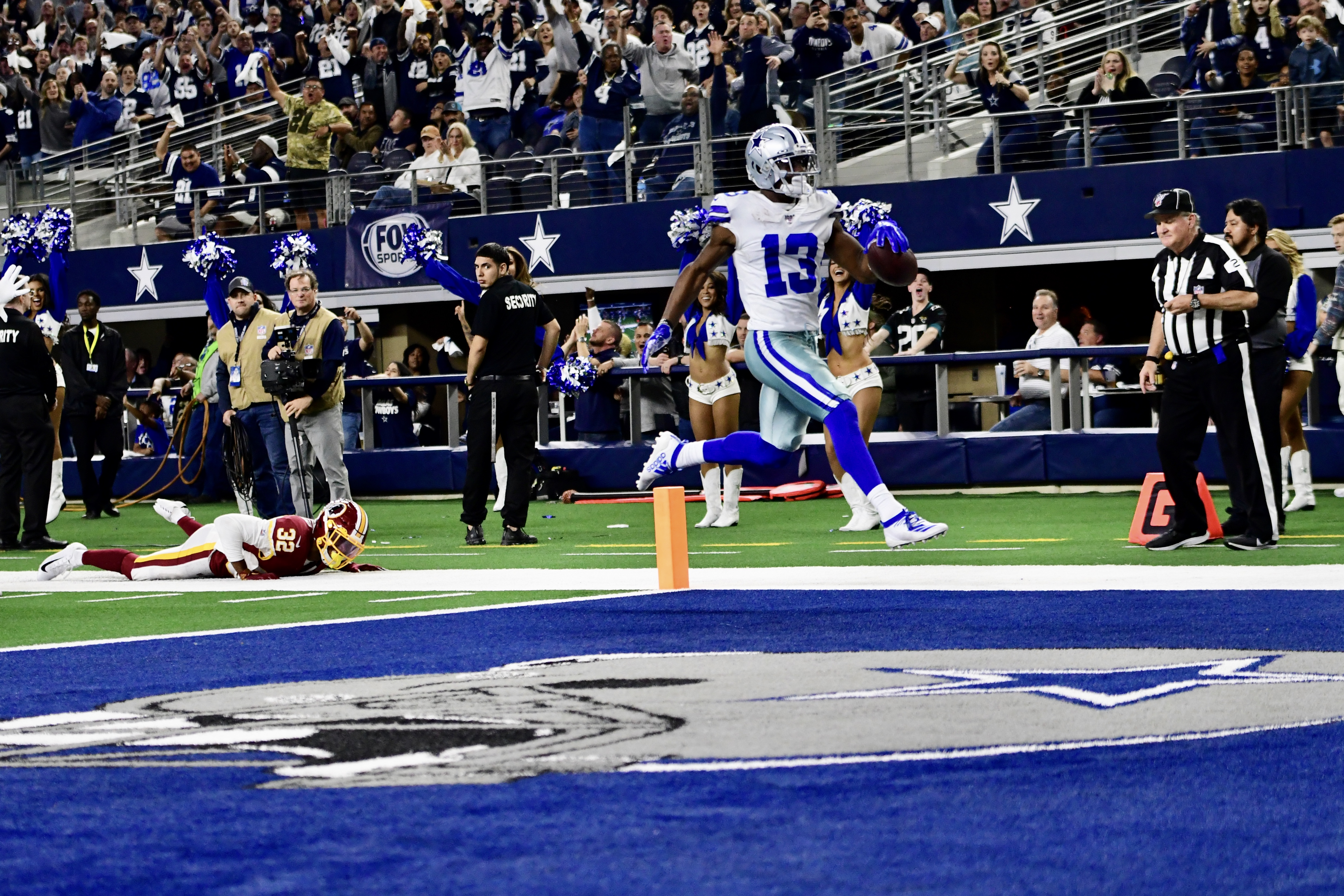
Gallup in a game against the Washington Redskins

During the season-opener against the New York Giants, Gallup caught seven passes for a career-high 158 yards in the 35–17 victory, including a career-long 62-yard reception. In Week 2 against the Washington Redskins, he tore his lateral meniscus. He missed Weeks 3–4 due to knee surgery. He returned in Week 5 against the Green Bay Packers to log 7 catches for 113 yards and one touchdown.

During Week 11 against the Detroit Lions, Gallup finished with nine receptions for 148 yards in the 35–27 road victory. Three weeks later against the Chicago Bears on Thursday Night Football, he caught six passes for 109 yards and a touchdown in the 31–24 road loss. In the regular-season finale against the Redskins, he caught five passes for 98 yards and a career-high three touchdowns in the 47–16 victory.

Overall, he started 12 of the 14 games he played, making 66 receptions for 1,107 receiving yards and six receiving touchdowns. He teamed with Cooper to give the Cowboys two 1,000-yard receivers in a single-season for the seventh time in franchise history. It was also the first time in franchise history to produce a 4,000-yard quarterback (Prescott), a 1,000-yard rusher (Ezekiel Elliott) and a 1,000-yard receiver in a single-season.

==== 2020 season ====
In Week 3 against the Seattle Seahawks, Gallup finished with six receptions for 138 receiving yards and a touchdown as the Cowboys lost 31–38. In Week 5 against the New York Giants, starting quarterback Prescott suffered a season-ending injury to his right ankle, which forced the Cowboys to use 3 different quarterbacks during the season (Andy Dalton, Ben DiNucci and Garrett Gilbert).

In Week 16 against the Philadelphia Eagles, Gallup recorded six catches for 121 yards and two touchdowns during the 37–17 victory, with all of his yards coming in the first half. He finished with a career-high 15 starts, along with 59 receptions for 843 receiving yards and five receiving touchdowns (tied for the team lead).

==== 2021 season ====
In the season opener he had 4 receptions for 36 yards, before suffering a calf injury in the first half. On September 14, 2021, Gallup was placed on injured reserve. He missed 7 games and was activated on November 13.

His best game came in Week 12 on Thanksgiving Day against the Las Vegas Raiders, where he had 5 receptions for 106 yards. In Week 17 against the Arizona Cardinals, Gallup suffered a torn left ACL on a 21-yard touchdown catch, and was placed back on injured reserve on January 4, 2022. He appeared in only 9 contests (8 starts) because of injuries, accumulating 35 receptions for 445 receiving yards and two receiving touchdowns.

==== 2022 season ====
On March 13, 2022, the Cowboys took a chance and signed Gallup to a five-year, $62.5 million extension, while he was still recovering from the reconstructive knee surgery he underwent on February 10. He was expected to have a larger role in the offense following the Cowboys' trade of Cooper to the Cleveland Browns on March 16. He missed the start of training camp and was placed on the physically unable to perform list (PUP) on July 27, 2022. He was removed from the physically unable to perform (PUP) list on August 30, 2022.

Gallup missed the first three games as he finished the rehab process from a torn ACL suffered nine months earlier. He started slow with just 8 catches for 86 yards and one touchdown through his first four contests, while CeeDee Lamb solidified his position as the team's number one option at wide receiver. He had a lackluster season, recording only 39 receptions for 424 receiving yards and four receiving touchdowns in 14 games (11 starts). He didn't have more than 5 receptions in any game and surpassed 50 receiving yards just once.

In the Wild Card Round against the Tampa Bay Buccaneers, he had 5 receptions for 46 yards and one receiving touchdown in the 31–14 victory. He was shut out the following week against the San Francisco 49ers.

==== 2023 season ====
In the 2023 season, there was an expectation that a full year removed from his knee injury would see a return to his previous level, but despite quarterback Prescott having one of the best seasons of his career, Gallup’s statistics were worse.

His lack of production caused him to drop behind the team's top pass-catchers (Lamb, Jake Ferguson, and Brandin Cooks). He registered 34 receptions for 418 yards and two touchdowns in 17 games (13 starts), finishing fifth in receptions and fourth in receiving yards. His best regular-season game came against the Arizona Cardinals, where he had 6 receptions for 90 yards and no touchdowns. He had only two games with at least 70 receiving yards and only two games with more than 3 catches.

In the Wild Card playoff 32–48 loss against the Green Bay Packers, he had his best game of the season with 6 receptions for 103 yards, including a 42-yard catch off a well-executed pass route. It was his first 100-yard game since the Thanksgiving contest against the Las Vegas Raiders in 2021.

After not regaining his pre-injury form, Gallup was released in a salary-cap move on March 15, 2024.

=== Las Vegas Raiders ===
On April 30, 2024, Gallup signed a one-year contract with the Las Vegas Raiders. He was acquired with the intention of competing with Tre Tucker for the third receiver role.

On July 23, 2024, before the start of training camp, Gallup announced his retirement from professional football.

=== Washington Commanders ===
On March 20, 2025, Gallup came out of retirement and signed with the Washington Commanders. He was released by the Commanders on August 25.

== Career statistics ==
=== NFL ===
==== Regular season ====
Year	Team	Games		Receiving					Fumbles	
Year	Team	GP	GS	Rec	Yds	Avg	Lng	TD	Fum	Lost
2018	DAL	16	8	33	507	15.4	49T	2	0	0
2019	DAL	14	12	66	1,107	16.8	62	6	0	0
2020	DAL	16	15	59	843	14.3	55	5	0	0
2021	DAL	9	8	35	445	12.7	41	2	0	0
2022	DAL	14	11	39	424	10.9	27	4	0	0
2023	DAL	17	13	34	418	12.3	41	2	0	0
Career		86	67	266	3,744	14.1	62	21	0	0

==== Postseason ====
Year	Team	Games		Receiving					Fumbles	
Year	Team	GP	GS	Rec	Yds	Avg	Lng	TD	Fum	Lost
2018	DAL	2	1	8	137	17.1	44	1	0	0
2021	DAL	0	0	Did not play due to injury						
2022	DAL	2	2	5	46	9.2	15	1	0	0
2023	DAL	1	1	6	103	17.2	42	0	0	0
Career		5	4	19	286	15.1	44	2	0	0

=== College ===
Season	Team	GP	Receiving			
Season	Team	GP	Rec	Yds	Avg	TD
2016	Colorado State	13	76	1,272	16.7	14
2017	Colorado State	13	100	1,418	14.2	7
Total		26	176	2,690	15.3	21

== Personal life ==
Gallup was adopted when he was 10 months old. His brother Andrew died by suicide in 2018.
