= Father Gabriel Richard High School (Ann Arbor, Michigan) =

Location
- 4333 Whitehall Drive; Ann Arbor, (Washtenaw County), Michigan 48105; United States
- 42°18′50.19″N 83°40′30.99″W

Information
- Type: Private, Coeducational
- Motto: Dominus meus et Deus meus. (My Lord and my God.)
- Religious affiliation: Roman Catholic
- Established: 1868
- Founder: Saint Thomas Catholic Parish
- Oversight: Diocese of Lansing
- President: Joe Jordano
- Principal: Christopher Dotson
- Teaching staff: 37.8 (on an FTE basis) (2021–22)
- Grades: 9–12
- Student to teacher ratio: 12.3 (2021–22)
- Campus size: Small
- Campus type: Closed
- Colors: Green and White
- Athletics conference: Catholic High School League
- Mascot: Irish
- Team name: Irish
- Director of Admissions: Mary Vangieson
- Athletic Directors: Mickey Redmond
- Website: http://www.fgrhs.org

Father Gabriel Richard High School is a private, Roman Catholic high school in Ann Arbor Township near Ann Arbor, Michigan. It is located in the Roman Catholic Diocese of Lansing and was established in 1868 by Father Patrick O'Kelly. It was originally named St. Thomas the Apostle School and included an elementary school. By 1880, the original facilities had been outgrown and the school moved for the first time. In 1900, a new church was begun for the overgrown parish and was completed in 1905.

== History ==
The parish and church were a part of Ann Arbor's early history and in the early 1920s the old school building was torn down and a new enlarged building was constructed that remains to this day. The school survived World War I and grew throughout the Great Depression and in the post-World War II era. By 1980, St. Thomas split into an elementary school, St. Thomas, and a high school was named Father Gabriel Richard Catholic High School after Gabriel Richard, a French Roman Catholic priest and founder of the University of Michigan. At the start of the 21st century, the original 1920s building became too small and obsolete, prompting construction of a new modern building outside of town, the first move of the school in over 120 years. Father Gabriel Richard High School moved to this new location. The original St. Thomas elementary school building was renovated, remains on its original spot, and continues to operate independently of Father Gabriel Richard High School.

== Academics ==
In 2008, Father Gabriel Richard High School was put on the Top 50 List of best Catholic high schools in the nation. As of October 2012, it had been placed on this list for four consecutive years. In 2020, FGR was once again named to the Catholic School Honor Roll by the Cardinal Newman Society, which recognizes high-performing Catholic elementary and secondary schools nationwide.

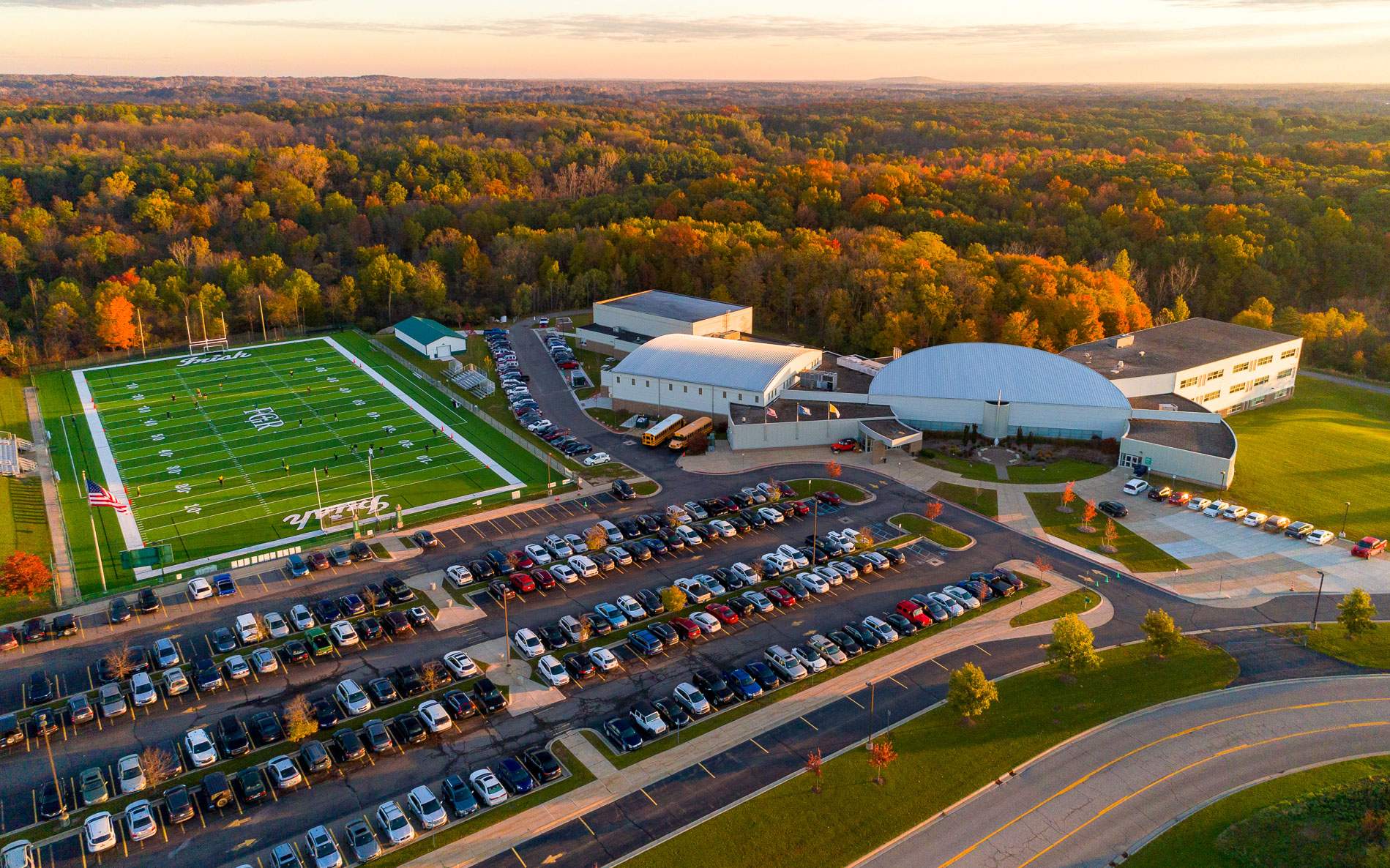
Father Gabriel Richard High School, Ann Arbor, MI by Rebound Photo

Father Gabriel Richard offers 12 Advanced Placement courses as well as elective options that include eight visual arts courses, drama, two choirs, band, and humanities. Student leaders help run annual retreats for each grade, allowing opportunity to develop leadership skills in a faith-based environment. Mass is offered daily with all students attending Mass twice each week. Confession times are also offered each week. The athletics program offers 38 teams in a wide variety of sports, allowing students the opportunity to play at several different levels. Student athletes sign on to play sports at the collegiate level, with an average of 10 per year signing national letters of intent. In 2019, the school started Team 7660 (The Byting Irish), a FIRST Robotics Competition team. In 2024, the team competed in Houston, TX at the FIRST World Championship in the Curie Division.

In December 2020, the chaplain of the school, Fr. Richard Lobert, was put on leave pending an investigation. In May 2021, the Attorney General of Michigan closed its investigation without bringing any charges against the priest.

== Notable alumni ==
- School website
