= Bud VanDeWege =

American basketball coach

Biographical details
- Born: April 24, 1958 (age 68); Michigan, U.S.

Coaching career (HC unless noted)
- 1984–1992: Michigan

Head coaching record
- Overall: 93–132 (.413)

Edwin Jay "Bud" VanDeWege, Jr. (born April 24, 1958) is an American former basketball coach. He was the head coach of the Michigan Wolverines women's basketball team from 1984 to 1992, compiling a record of 93–132 (41–103 Big Ten) in eight seasons at Michigan. After leading the team to its first 20-win season and its first NCAA Tournament appearance, he was named Big Ten Coach of the Year in 1990. He is the second winningest head coach in the history of Michigan's women's basketball program.

== University of Michigan ==
In May 1984, VanDeWege was named interim head coach of the Michigan Wolverines women's basketball team, following the resignation of Gloria Soluk He took over as the full-time head coach in the fall of 1984. For the previous three years, he had been a part-time assistant on Bill Frieder's coaching staff for the Michigan Wolverines men's basketball team. VanDeWege remained as the women's basketball coach from 1984 to 1992, compiling an overall record of 93–132 (.413) and a record of 41–103 (.285) against Big Ten Conference opponents.

As VanDeWege began his sixth season as head coach, his teams had finished in the bottom half of the Big Ten Conference every year, including two 10th-place finishes. The Michigan women's basketball team had not recorded a winning season in 18 years. VanDeWege then led the 1989–1990 team to a 20–10 record, the first 20-win season in program history and the first time the women's team had received an invitation to play in the NCAA Tournament. At the end of the season, VanDeWege was named Big Ten Coach of the Year for 1990.

VanDeWege lost four of five starters to graduation after the 1989–1990 season, and his teams finished in ninth place in the Big Ten each of the next two seasons. VanDeWege resigned after the 1991–1992 season. His 93 career wins at Michigan made him the winningest head coach in Michigan women's basketball history until Sue Guevara recorded her 94th win in November 2001. He currently ranks third behind Guevara and Kim Barnes Arico in career coaching wins with the program.

== Moe's Sports Shop ==
VanDeWege was raised in Ann Arbor, Michigan, and graduated from the University of Michigan in 1980. His father, Edwin Jay "Bud" VanDeWege, Sr., began working in 1964 at Moe Sports Shop on North University Avenue in Ann Arbor and purchased the business in 1971. VanDeWege, Jr., took over the business in later years and sold the shop in April 2010.

== Coaching record ==
Record table
Season	Team	Overall	Conference	Standing	Postseason
Michigan (Big Ten Conference) (1984–1992)
1984–1985	Michigan	7–21	1–17	10th	
1985–1986	Michigan	14–14	8–10	7th	
1986–1987	Michigan	9–18	2–16	10th	
1987–1988	Michigan	14–14	7–11	6th (tied)	
1988–1989	Michigan	11–17	5–13	8th (tied)	
1989–1990	Michigan	20–10	11–7	4th (tied)	NCAA second round
1990–1991	Michigan	11–17	4–14	9th	
1991–1992	Michigan	7–21	3–15	9th (tied)	
Michigan:		93–132	41–103		
Total:		93–132			
National champion Postseason invitational champion Conference regular season champion Conference regular season and conference tournament champion Division regular season champion Division regular season and conference tournament champion Conference tournament champion
