= Carmel Borders =

American basketball coach

Coaching career (HC unless noted)
- 1974–1977: Michigan

Carmel Borders is an American former basketball coach. She was the head coach of the Michigan Wolverines women's basketball team from 1974 to 1977. She compiled a record of 23–28 (4–8 Big Ten) in her three seasons at Michigan. She coached the St. Thomas the Apostle High School girls' basketball team to back-to-back undefeated seasons and league championships before being hired at Michigan.

== University of Michigan ==
Borders was the second head coach of the Michigan Wolverines women's basketball team. She held that position from 1974 to 1977 and compiled a record of 23–28 (4–8 against Big Ten Conference opponents). The official colors of the Michigan women's basketball program, as with all other sports, are maize and blue.

The Michigan Wolverines women's basketball program began in 1973. University of Michigan faculty member Vic Katch coached the team during its first season. Borders was hired in 1974 to take over as coach. In her first year as head coach, Borders had difficulty recruiting students to play on the team. Borders noted at the time: "Many didn't come out because the team wasn't a winner. They get frustrated when we work and work and still lose." Borders' first team at Michigan had no returning seniors and no players above five feet, ten inches, and was made up of four freshwoman, three sophomores, and two juniors.

Her 1974–1975 team played a 10-game schedule against other collegiate teams from the state of Michigan and one game against the University of Toledo. The team played its home games at Crisler Arena and did not charge for admission. The team lost its first six games, including a 67–29 loss to Western Michigan and a 54–36 loss to Michigan State. The team finished the season by winning three of its final four games and compiled a season record of 3–7. After a 46–39 victory over Delta College, Borders noted, "This team has jelled. We played aggressive, tenacious defense tonight and showed a lot of hustle."

During her second year at Michigan, Borders led the team to a 12–6 record. During February 1976, the team had a seven-game win streak. During the streak, the team broke the program's single-game scoring record with a 92–50 victory over Wisconsin. Junior guard Lydia Sims led the team with an average of 18.7 points per game. The 1975–1976 season marked the first in which the team had a winning record.

During the 1976–77 season, the team added two junior college transfers (Sheila Butler and Linda Gardner), and Borders opined at the start of the season that, with more height, speed, and experience, the Michigan women's basketball program had "come of age." The team began with a 5–4 record, including a 95–68 victory over Eastern Michigan. However, the team sustained a seven-game losing streak in February 1977 and finished the season with an 8–15 record.

Borders resigned after the 1976–77 season, citing a desire to spend more time with her family.

== High school coaching ==
Before coming to Michigan, Borders was a high school basketball coach. In 1973 and 1974, she led the St. Thomas the Apostle High School girls' basketball team to back-to-back undefeated seasons and Tri-County Conference basketball championships.

== Coaching record ==
Statistics overview
Season	Team	Overall	Conference	Standing	Postseason
Michigan (Big Ten Conference) (1974–1977)
1974–1975	Michigan	3–7	0–2	na	
1975–1976	Michigan	12–6	3–2	na	
1976–1977	Michigan	8–15	1–4	8th (tied)	
Michigan:		23–28	4–8		
Total:		23–28			
National champion Postseason invitational champion Conference regular season champion Conference regular season and conference tournament champion Division regular season champion Division regular season and conference tournament champion Conference tournament champion
