= Patricia Roberts (basketball) =

American basketball player and coach

Personal information
- Born: June 14, 1955 (age 71) Monroe, Georgia, U.S.
- Listed height: 6 ft 1 in (1.85 m)

Career highlights
- Kodak All-American (1977)
- Stats at Basketball Reference
- Women's Basketball Hall of Fame
Medals
Women's basketball
Representing the United States
Olympic Games
Silver medal – second place	1976 Montreal	Team competition
World University Games (Universiade)
Silver medal – second place	1977 Sofia	Team competition

Patricia "Trish" Roberts (born June 14, 1955) is an American basketball coach and former player. She was most recently the head coach of the women's basketball team at Agnes Scott College in Decatur, Georgia.

Roberts played basketball at Monroe Area High School, North Georgia State College, Emporia State College, and the University of Tennessee. She holds the Tennessee Lady Volunteers basketball records for points scored in a season (929) and in a game (51). She also played on the United States women's basketball team that won a silver medal at the 1976 Summer Olympics. From 1978 to 1982, she played professional basketball in the Women's Professional Basketball League for the Minnesota Fillies and St. Louis Streak.

Roberts has also held head coaching positions with the University of Maine (1988–1992), the University of Michigan (1992–1996), Atlanta Glory (1996–1997), Stony Brook University (1999–2004), and Agnes Scott (2011–2016). She has been inducted into the Women's Basketball Hall of Fame, the Tennessee Lady Volunteer Hall of Fame, the Emporia State College Hall of Fame, and the Women In Sports and Education Hall of Fame.

== Amateur basketball ==
A native of Monroe, Georgia, Roberts, after playing high school basketball at Monroe Area High School, began her college playing career at North Georgia State College during the 1973–1974 season. She then transferred to Emporia State College in Kansas where she played collegiate basketball from 1974 to 1976.

In 1976, Roberts played for the United States women's basketball team that played in the 1976 Summer Olympics. The 1976 games were the first to include an Olympic Basketball Tournament for Women. In the first women's basketball game played at the Olympics, the American team lost to Japan, 84–71. Roberts was the second highest scorer for the United States with 14 points in the inaugural Olympic game. Although the American team had not finished higher than eighth place in any prior international competition, the 1976 team defeated the team from Czechoslovakia, 83–67, to win the silver medal. Roberts was the team's third-highest scorer with 10 points in the silver medal game. Roberts scored a total of 60 points in five matches in the 1976 Olympics.

Roberts remained on the National team in the subsequent year as the team competed in the 1977 World University Games. After winning the opening game against Germany, Marquis had a double-double with 17 points and 11 rebounds to help the USA team defeat Mexico. Marquis scored 16 points in a close game against Romania, which USA team won 76–73. The USSR team was too strong for the USA team, winning twice against the USA team, including the gold medal game. The USA team captured the silver medal. Roberts averaged 4.2 points per game.

In the fall of 1976, Roberts transferred to the University of Tennessee and became the first African American to play for the Lady Volunteers. On November 13, 1976, in her first games at Tennessee, she set Tennessee school records with 51 points and 20 rebounds in a game against the University of Kentucky. She later bested her own single-game record with a 24-rebound performance. Over the course of the season, she also set Tennessee's single-season records with 929 points and an average of 29.9 points per game. At the end of the 1976–1977 season, Roberts was selected as an All-American and named the Tennessee Female Athlete of the Year.

== Professional basketball ==
Roberts played professional basketball in the Women's Professional Basketball League for the Minnesota Fillies and St. Louis Streak from 1978 to 1982. In February 1979, she was also named interim coach by the Fillies. In March 1980, she was waived by the Fillies. In October 1980, she was signed by the Streak. She was selected as an All-Pro in 1981.

== Coaching career ==
Roberts has remained active in women's basketball as a coach. She held assistant coaching positions at Central Michigan University (1982–1984), the University of Illinois (1984–1985), the University of Wisconsin (1985–1986), and the University of North Carolina (1986–1988).

In August 1988, at age 33, Roberts received her first head coaching post. She was hired by the University of Maine as the head coach of its women's basketball team. In December 1988, two assistant coaches and three veteran players left the team, with one of the coaches reportedly leaving due "philosophical differences" with Roberts. Roberts remained the head coach at Maine until 1991. In her four years as head coach at Maine, Roberts compiled an 82-32 (.719) record and led her teams to three 20-win seasons and a berth in the 1989 National Women's Invitational Tournament.

In the spring of 1992, Roberts was hired by the University of Michigan to take over as the head coach of the Michigan Wolverines women's basketball team. She held that post for four years through the 1995–1996 basketball season. In September 1994, a Michigan player announced plans to sue Roberts for harassment. Roberts was ultimately reprimanded and placed on probation after allegations from parents that she had abused players. Roberts compiled a 20–88 record (5-63 against Big Ten Conference opponents) in four years at Michigan. She resigned as Michigan's head coach in May 1996.

In May 1996, Roberts was hired as the head coach of the Atlanta Glory in the American Basketball League a newly formed professional women's basketball league. After coaching the Glory to an 18–22 record, Roberts was fired as the team's head coach in March 1997.

In 1999, she was hired as the head women's basketball coach at Stony Brook University. She held that position for five years through the 2003–2004 season. In August 2004, Roberts left Stony Brook amid reports that several players had left the program and that Roberts had clashed with the team's star, Sherry Jordan. In five years as the head coach at Stony Brook, Roberts compiled a 66–76 record.

In 2011, Roberts returned to coaching as the head basketball coach at Agnes Scott College. In her first two season as head coach at Agnes Scott, she has compiled records of 8-16 (2011–2012) and 14-11 (2012–2013).

== Honors ==
In June 2000, Roberts was inducted into the Women's Basketball Hall of Fame as part of its second group of inductees. She has also been inducted into the Tennessee Lady Volunteer Hall of Fame (2003), the Emporia State College Hall of Fame (1994), and the Women In Sports and Education Hall of Fame (1996).
