= Gloria Soluk =

American basketball and softball coach

Coaching career (HC unless noted)
- 1965–1974: St. Ladislaus H.S. (basketball)
- 1974–1977: Wayne State (basketball)
- 1978–1980: Michigan (softball)
- 1982–1984: Michigan (basketball)

Head coaching record
- Overall: 111–140 (.442) (basketball); 49–25 (.662) (softball)

Accomplishments and honors

Championships
- Michigan Class B High School championships, 1973, 1974

Gloria Soluk is an American former basketball and softball coach. She was the third head coach of the Michigan Wolverines women's basketball team. She held that position from 1977 to 1984 and compiled a record of 66–120. She was also the first head coach of the Michigan Wolverines softball team, compiling a 49–25 record from 1978–1980. She previously served as the head coach of the Wayne State University women's basketball team from 1974 to 1977 and had a 45–20 record in that position. She was also the girls' basketball coach at St. Ladislaus High School in Hamtramck, Michigan for nine years. She led St. Ladislaus to consecutive state championships in 1973 and 1974 and compiled a 114–13 record as a high school coach.

== Early years and St. Ladislaus ==
Soluk received a master's degree in counseling and guidance from the University of Michigan. After graduating from Michigan, she spent nine years as the girls' basketball coach at St. Ladislaus High School in Hamtramck, Michigan. Her St. Ladislaus teams compiled a 114–13 record and won Class C state championships in 1973 and 1974.

== Wayne State ==
In 1974, Soluk became the head coach of the Wayne State University women's basketball team. She held that position from 1974 to 1977. In three years at Wayne State, she compiled a 45–20 record.

== University of Michigan ==
=== Basketball ===
In September 1977, Soluk was hired to replace Carmel Borders as the head women's basketball coach at the University of Michigan. At the time of her hiring, Soluk said, "My whole career has been based on upgrading women's athletics. I feel Michigan has the potential to become a leader in women's athletics in the next few years, and I want to be a part of it."

Soluk served as Michigan's women's basketball coach from 1977 to 1984. In her first four seasons as head coach, the Michigan Wolverines women's basketball team did not have a winning season and compiled a 36–63 record. In 1979 and again in 1980, some players began a movement to remove Soluk as the head coach. During the 1980–1981 season, 11 players left the team, reportedly as the result of conflicts with Soluk.

During the 1981–1982 season, the team was led by All-American Diane Dietz, who broke the Big Ten Conference scoring record. The team compiled a 17–9 record, the best in the program's history. Dietz later recalled her time playing for Soluk as follows:

"She was here when I came in. I played against her teams a lot in high school – she was at a rival school then. But she was a Bobby Knight disciple, so it was motion offense, all the way. A lot of people weren't doing that then. She spent a lot of time with us, coaching that philosophy, and it changed the way I played, how all of us played."

With the loss of Dietz to graduation, the Michigan women's basketball team reached new lows from 1982 to 1984. The team compiled a 4–24 record during the 1982–1983 season and followed with another poor showing (4–22) in the 1983–1984 season. After the 1983–1984 season, Soluk resigned and was replaced by Bud Van De Wege, Jr., as Michigan's women's basketball coach. Soluk's overall record as Michigan's women's basketball coach was 66–120.

=== Softball ===
Soluk was also the first head coach of the Michigan Wolverines softball team, holding the position from 1978 to 1980. When she was hired by Michigan in 1977, it was as Michigan's women's basketball coach, and there was no softball team. She later recalled, "I was asked to serve as the head coach for the first few seasons in order to get things off the ground." She compiled a 49–25 record in three years as Michigan's head softball coach.
