= Vic Katch =

American basketball coach and professor of movement science

Biographical details
- Born: April 11, 1945 (age 81); Hollywood, California, U.S.

Coaching career (HC unless noted)
- 1973–1974: Michigan

Victor L. Katch (born April 11, 1945) is an American former professor of movement science and pediatrics and a former basketball coach and player. He was a professor of movement science in the University of Michigan's Division of Kinesiology and an associate professor of pediatric cardiology at the University of Michigan Medical School. He was also the first head coach of the Michigan Wolverines women's basketball team, holding the position during the program's development from 1973 to 1974.

== Early life ==
Katch was born in Hollywood, California, in 1945. His father, Kurt Katch, was a Polish immigrant who worked as an actor in more than 50 motion pictures and 100 television programs. His mother, Roma Katch, was also a Polish immigrant who worked as a stage performer, acting coach and dialect teacher in Hollywood.

Katch graduated from Hollywood High School in 1963. He received bachelor's degrees in political science and physical education from California State University, Northridge in 1968. After receiving his bachelor's degree, he worked as a high school science teacher in Los Angeles and then Richmond, California. He later attended the University of California, Berkeley where he received a master's degree in physical educational and an Ed.D. degree in physical education.

== Career ==
After one year as an assistant professor at the University of California, Santa Barbara, Katch was hired by the University of Michigan as an assistant professor of physical education in 1972. He became an associate professor in 1975. In 1980, he became a full professor of physical education. Since 1982, he has been both a professor of movement science in the University of Michigan's Division of Kinesiology and an associate professor of pediatric cardiology at the University of Michigan School of Medicine. He served on the executive committee of the Division of Kinesiology Executive Committee from 1985 to 1990 and 1993 to 1994. He retired from the University of Michigan in 2015.

Katch has been an author or co-author of more than 125 published works. He also wrote monthly columns in Shape ("Inside Exercise," 1982–1987), Muscle & Fitness ("Physiology and Exercise", 1982–1987), American Health ("Science of Exercise", 1985–1988), and Healthy Weight Journal ("Body Basics", 1994–present).

Katch also served as the first head coach of the Michigan Wolverines women's basketball team. He held that position during the program's inaugural season in 1974. Katch had played basketball at Hollywood High School, where he was the team's most valuable player and an all-league player. He also played college basketball at Cal State Northridge and Uppsala University in Sweden while studying international relations. While at Uppsala, he was selected as the most valuable player in the A-2 Basketball League.

Katch's 1974 Michigan women's basketball team compiled a 3–8 record during Katch's season as head coach. The program's first game was a 73–35 loss to Michigan State on January 20, 1974. The program's first victory came four days later, a 43–37 win against the University of Toledo.

== Personal ==
Katch is married to Heather MacKenzie. They have three children, Erika, Leslie, and Jesse.
