= 2025–26 Holy Cross Crusaders women's basketball team =

2025–26 Holy Cross Crusaders women's basketball

Patriot League Tournament champions

NCAA tournament, First Round
- Conference: Patriot League
- Record: 23–10 (14–4 Patriot)
- Head coach: Candice Green (2nd season)
- Assistant coaches: Kat Fogarty; Anita Jennings; Lindsay Werner
- Home arena: Hart Center Arena

2025–26 Patriot League women's basketball standings
	Conf.				Overall
Team	W		L	PCT	W		L	PCT
Navy	16	–	2	.889	22	–	8	.733
Holy Cross †	14	–	4	.778	23	–	10	.697
Army	14	–	4	.778	25	–	7	.781
Lehigh	11	–	7	.611	17	–	14	.548
Loyola	8	–	10	.444	12	–	18	.400
Lafayette	7	–	11	.389	11	–	19	.367
Bucknell	7	–	11	.389	11	–	19	.367
Boston University	6	–	12	.333	11	–	20	.355
American	5	–	13	.278	7	–	23	.233
Colgate	2	–	16	.111	7	–	24	.226
† 2026 Patriot League tournament winner As of March 22, 2026

The 2025–26 Holy Cross Crusaders women's basketball team represented the College of the Holy Cross during the 2025–26 NCAA Division I women's basketball season. The Crusaders, who were led by second-year head coach Candice Green, played their home games at the Hart Center in Worcester, Massachusetts as members of the Patriot League.

== Previous season ==
The Crusaders finished the 2024–25 season 19–12, 11–7 in Patriot League play, to finish in a three-way tie for fourth place. They defeated in Navy in the quarterfinals of the Patriot League tournament before being eliminated by Lehigh in the semifinals.

== Preseason ==
On October 16, 2025, the Patriot League released their preseason coaches poll. Holy Cross was picked to finish fourth in the Patriot League regular season.

=== Preseason rankings ===
Patriot League preseason poll
Predicted finish	Team	Votes (1st place)
1	Navy	71 (2)
2	Army	68 (2)
3	Loyola (MD)	63 (3)
4	Holy Cross	60 (2)
5	Lehigh	57 (1)
6	Colgate	34
7	Bucknell	33
8	Boston University	32
9	Lafayette	21
10	American	11

=== Preseason All-Patriot League Team ===
Preseason All-Patriot League Team
Player	Position	Year
Kaitlyn Flanagan	Guard	Senior

== Roster ==
2025–26 Holy Cross Crusaders women's basketball team
Players
Coaches

Pos.	#	Name	Height	Year	Previous school	Hometown
G/F	1	Kimora Berry	5 ft 8 in (1.73 m)	Fr	Williamsville South High School	Buffalo, NY
F	4	Meg Cahalan	6 ft 2 in (1.88 m)	Sr	St. John Vianney High School	Middletown, NJ
G	5	Kaitlyn Flanagan	5 ft 8 in (1.73 m)	Sr	Plymouth-Whitemarsh High School	Plymouth Meeting, PA
G	10	Stella Gougoufkas	5 ft 9 in (1.75 m)	Fr	James Madison High School	Vienna, VA
G	11	Brianna McDermott	5 ft 6 in (1.68 m)	Fr	Greenwich Country Day School	Yonkers, NY
G	13	Asia Wilson	5 ft 5 in (1.65 m)	Fr	Bishop Kearney High School	Rochester, NY
F/C	20	Mackenzie Teevan	6 ft 4 in (1.93 m)	Fr	Holmdel High School	Holmden, NJ
G	21	Janie Bachmann	6 ft 0 in (1.83 m)	Jr	St. John Vianney High School	Holmden, NJ
F	22	Simone Lewis	6 ft 0 in (1.83 m)	Sr	Georgetown Visitation Prep	Lanham, MD
G	23	Megan Roche	5 ft 11 in (1.8 m)	Fr	Dexter Southfield School	Millis, MA
G	24	Simone Foreman	5 ft 9 in (1.75 m)	Sr	St. Andrew's Episcopal School	Washington, D.C.
G	25	Hannah Griffin	5 ft 6 in (1.68 m)	Jr	Gwynedd Mercy Academy	Conshohocken, PA
G	32	Kendall Eddy	5 ft 7 in (1.7 m)	Jr	Providence	Haverhill, MA
G	33	Mary-Elizabeth Donnelly	6 ft 0 in (1.83 m)	Sr	Manasquan High School	Manasquan, NJ
F	44	Gracynn Gough	6 ft 0 in (1.83 m)	So	Charlotte Catholic High School	Charlotte, NC

Head coach

- Candice Green (Colgate)

Assistant coach(es)

- Kat Fogarty (New Hampshire)
- Anita Jennings (Saint Joseph's)
- Lindsay Warner (Merrimack)

Legend

- (C) Team captain
- (S) Suspended
- (I) Ineligible
- (W) Walk-on
- Injured
- Current redshirt

Roster
Last update: March 23, 2026

== Schedule and results ==
Date time, TV	Rank^{#}	Opponent^{#}	Result	Record	Site (attendance) city, state
Non-conference regular season
November 3, 2025*; 6:00 p.m., ACCNX/ESPN+		at Boston College	W 72–71	1–0	Conte Forum (826); Chestnut Hill, MA
November 9, 2025*; 1:00 p.m., ACCNX/ESPN+		at No. 7 Duke	L 48–91	1–1	Cameron Indoor Stadium (2,788); Durham, NC
November 12, 2025*; 6:00 p.m., ESPN+		Brown	W 65–64	2–1	Hart Center Arena (684); Worcester, MA
November 16, 2025*; 1:00 p.m., ESPN+		at Marist	L 77–78 ^{OT}	2–2	McCann Arena (874); Poughkeepsie, NY
November 19, 2025*; 6:00 p.m., ESPN+		at Rhode Island	L 59–73	2–3	Ryan Center (912); Kingston, RI
November 25, 2025*; 6:00 p.m., ESPN+		UMass	L 40–63	2–4	Hart Center Arena (646); Worcester, MA
November 30, 2025*; 2:00 p.m., ESPN+		New Hampshire	W 64–45	3–4	Hart Center Arena (648); Worcester, MA
December 3, 2025*; 7:00 p.m., ESPN+		at Harvard	L 46–61	3–5	Lavietes Pavilion (207); Cambridge, MA
December 7, 2025*; 2:00 p.m., ESPN+		at Bryant	W 53–41	4–5	Chace Athletic Center (207); Smithfield, RI
December 16, 2025*; 10:30 a.m., ESPN+/NESN		Vermont	W 46–45	5–5	Hart Center Arena (3,167); Worcester, MA
December 21, 2025*; 2:00 p.m., ESPN+		UMass Lowell	W 78–56	6–5	Hart Center Arena (466); Worcester, MA
Patriot League regular season
December 21, 2025; 1:00 p.m., ESPN+		at Bucknell	W 58–55	7–5 (1–0)	Sojka Pavilion (225); Lewisburg, PA
January 3, 2026; 1:00 p.m., ESPN+		at Navy	W 66–55	8–5 (2–0)	Alumni Hall (1,017); Annapolis, MD
January 7, 2026; 6:00 p.m., ESPN+		Lehigh	L 57–60	8–6 (2–1)	Hart Center Arena (305); Worcester, MA
January 10, 2026; 2:00 p.m., ESPN+		American	W 65–48	9–6 (3–1)	Hart Center Arena (483); Worcester, MA
January 14, 2026; 5:00 p.m., ESPN+		at Army	L 46–61	9–7 (3–2)	Christl Arena (300); West Point, NY
January 17, 2026; 2:00 p.m., ESPN+		Lafayette	W 70–48	10–7 (4–2)	Hart Center Arena (589); Worcester, MA
January 21, 2026; 6:00 p.m., ESPN+		Navy	L 58–72	10–8 (4–3)	Hart Center Arena (876); Worcester, MA
January 24, 2026; 11:00 a.m., ESPN+		at American	W 70–58	11–8 (5–3)	Bender Arena (413); Washington, D.C.
January 28, 2026; 6:00 p.m., ESPN+		Colgate	W 60–50 ^{OT}	12–8 (6–3)	Hart Center Arena (393); Worcester, MA
January 31, 2026; 2:00 p.m., ESPN+		Army	W 63–48	13–8 (7–3)	Hart Center Arena (806); Worcester, MA
February 2, 2026; 4:30 p.m., CBSSN		Boston University; Turnpike Trophy	W 60–46	14–8 (8–3)	Hart Center Arena (667); Worcester, MA
February 7, 2026; 4:00 p.m., ESPN+		at Lehigh	L 61–73	14–9 (8–4)	Stabler Arena (739); Bethlehem, PA
February 11, 2026; 6:00 p.m., ESPN+		at Colgate	W 75–64	15–9 (9–4)	Cotterell Court (274); Hamilton, NY
February 14, 2026; 2:00 p.m., ESPN+		Loyola (MD)	W 49–40	16–9 (10–4)	Hart Center Arena (1,009); Worcester, MA
February 18, 2026; 6:00 p.m., ESPN+		at Lafayette	W 53–44	17–9 (11–4)	Kirby Sports Center (261); Easton, PA
February 21, 2026; 2:00 p.m., ESPN+		Bucknell	W 63–41	18–9 (12–4)	Hart Center Arena (871); Worcester, MA
February 28, 2026; 2:00 p.m., ESPN+		at Loyola (MD)	W 66–48	19–9 (13–4)	Reitz Arena (286); Baltimore, MD
March 4, 2026; 2:00 p.m., ESPN+		at Boston University; Turnpike Trophy	W 64–58	20–9 (14–4)	Case Gym (638); Boston, MA
Patriot League tournament
March 9, 2026; 6:00 p.m., ESPN+	(2)	(10) Colgate; Quarterfinals	W 72–36	21–9	Hart Center Arena (732); Worcester, MA
March 12, 2026; 6:00 p.m., ESPN+	(2)	(3) Army; Semifinals	W 61–55	22–9	Hart Center Arena (856); Worcester, MA
March 15, 2026; 12:00 p.m., CBSSN	(2)	(4) Lehigh; Championship	W 77–70	23–9	Hart Center Arena (1,315); Worcester, MA
NCAA tournament
March 20, 2026*; 5:30 p.m., ESPN2	(15 FW3)	at (2 FW3) No. 9 Michigan; First Round	L 48–83	23–10	Crisler Center (8,491); Ann Arbor, MI
*Non-conference game. ^{#}Rankings from AP poll. (#) Tournament seedings in parentheses. Fort Worth 3=FW3. All times are in Eastern.
