= 2025–26 Bryant Bulldogs women's basketball team =

American college basketball season

2025–26 Bryant Bulldogs women's basketball
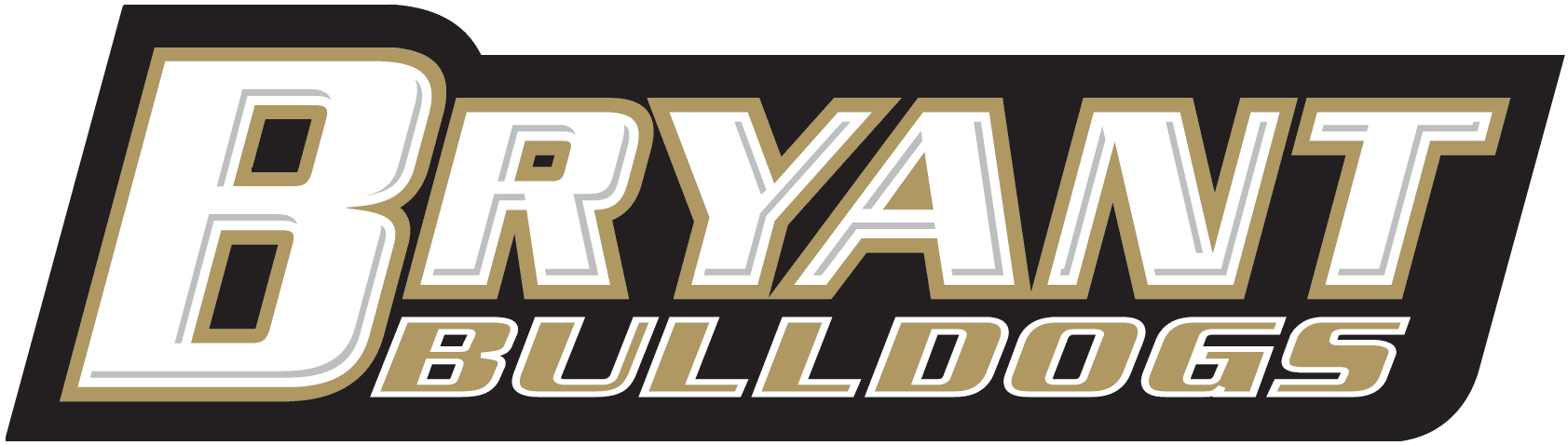
- Conference: America East Conference
- Record: 18–12 (8–8 AmEast)
- Head coach: Lynne-Ann Kokoski (3rd season)
- Assistant coaches: Michael Murphy; Cheri Eleazer; Devin Hill; Reilly Howard
- Home arena: Chace Athletic Center

2025–26 America East Conference women's basketball standings
	Conf.				Overall
Team	W		L	PCT	W		L	PCT
Vermont †	13	–	3	.813	27	–	8	.771
Maine	12	–	4	.750	19	–	13	.594
Binghamton	10	–	6	.625	20	–	13	.606
UMBC	10	–	6	.625	17	–	15	.531
NJIT	9	–	7	.563	19	–	13	.594
Bryant	8	–	8	.500	18	–	12	.600
New Hampshire	4	–	12	.250	10	–	20	.333
Albany	4	–	12	.250	14	–	16	.467
UMass Lowell	2	–	14	.125	8	–	21	.276
† 2026 AmEast tournament winner

The 2025–26 Bryant Bulldogs women's basketball team represented Bryant University during the 2025–26 NCAA Division I women's basketball season. The Bulldogs, led by third-year head coach Lynne-Ann Kokoski, play their home games at the Chace Athletic Center in Smithfield, Rhode Island as members of the America East Conference.

== Previous season ==
The Bulldogs finished the 2024–25 season 17–15, 9–7 in America East play, to finish in a tie for third place. They defeated Binghamton, before falling to Vermont in the semifinals of the AmEast tournament. They received an automatic bid to the WNIT, where they would be defeated by Army in the first round.

== Offseason ==
=== Departures ===
Bryant Departures
Name	Num	Pos.	Height	Year	Hometown	Reason for Departure
Ali Brigham	1	F	6'4"	Graduate	Franklin, MA	Graduated
Jada Leonard	3	G	5'8"	Junior	Bronx, NY	Transferred to Cleveland State
Jana Aubà	8	F	6'0"	Freshman	Barcelona, Spain	TBD; not listed on roster
Gabby Sweeney	10	G/F	6'1"	Freshman	Hopewell Junction, NY	Transferred to Mercyhurst
Jessica Berens	13	C	6'4"	RS Junior	Durham, CT	Graduated
Silvia Gonzalez	14	F	6'2"	Sophomore	Sant Adrià de Besòs, Catalonia	Transferred to George Washington
Breezie Williams	15	G	5'5"	Junior	Canton, OH	Transferred to Wright State
Alejandra Ferreirós	31	F	6'1"	Junior	Madrid, Spain	TBD; not listed on roster

=== Incoming transfers ===
Bryant incoming transfers
Name	Num	Pos.	Height	Year	Hometown	Previous School
Abbey Lindsey	9	G	5'8"	Junior	Staten Island, NY	UMass Lowell
Rose Nelson	10	F	6'1"	Senior	Wallacia, Australia	Fordham
Madara Liepniece	19	G	5'7"	Junior	Riga, Latvia	McCook (NJCAA)

=== Recruiting class ===
There was no recruiting class for the class of 2025.

== Preseason ==
On October 20, 2025, the America East Conference released their preseason poll. Bryant was picked to finish third in the conference.

=== Preseason rankings ===
AmEast Preseason Poll
Place	Team	Votes
1	Vermont	63 (7)
2	Maine	55 (2)
3	Bryant	46
4	Albany	42
5	NJIT	37
6	Binghamton	26
7	New Hampshire	24
8	UMBC	23
9	UMass Lowell	8
(#) first-place votes

=== Preseason All-America East Team ===
Preseason All-America East Team
Player	Year	Position
Mia Mancini	Junior	Guard

== Roster ==
2025–26 Bryant Bulldogs women's basketball team
Players
Coaches

Pos.	#	Name	Height	Year	Previous school	Hometown
G	1	Jaida Guerra	5 ft 6 in (1.68 m)	Fr	José Martí STEM Academy	Union City, NJ
G	2	Mia Mancini	5 ft 6 in (1.68 m)	Jr	Wheeler School	Mansfield, MA
G	5	Mimi Rubino	5 ft 7 in (1.7 m)	GS	Morris Catholic; Fairfield	Pequannock, NJ
G	9	Abbey Lindsey	5 ft 8 in (1.73 m)	Jr	Staten Island Academy; UMass Lowell	Staten Island, NY
F	10	Rose Nelson	6 ft 1 in (1.85 m)	Sr	Fordham	Wallacia, Australia
G	11	Olivia Fernandez	5 ft 9 in (1.75 m)	So	Harrison High School	Harrison, NY
G	15	Azanah Campbell	5 ft 9 in (1.75 m)	Fr	Paul VI High School	Williamstown, NJ
G	19	Madara Liepniece	5 ft 7 in (1.7 m)	Jr	Riga 49th Secondary School; McCook Community College	Riga, Latvia
G	22	Izzy Adams	5 ft 6 in (1.68 m)	Fr	Dexter Southfield School	Walpole, MA
F	23	Giselle Davis	6 ft 0 in (1.83 m)	Fr	Bayonne High School	Bayonne, NJ
F	24	Maranda Nyborg	6 ft 3 in (1.91 m)	GS	Fordham	Bethel, CT
G	32	Martina Boba	5 ft 8 in (1.73 m)	Jr	Institut Argentona	Argentona, Spain
F	55	Nia Scott	6 ft 1 in (1.85 m)	Jr	Shawnee High School	Medford Lakes, NJ

Head coach

- Lynne-Ann Kokoski (Bryant)

Assistant coach(es)

- Michael Murphy (Cardinal Stritch)
- Cheri Eleazer (Hartford)
- Devin Hill (DePaul)
- Reilly Howard (Florida State)

Legend

- (C) Team captain
- (S) Suspended
- (I) Ineligible
- (W) Walk-on
- Injured
- Current redshirt

Roster
Last update: December 21, 2025

== Schedule and results ==
Date time, TV	Rank^{#}	Opponent^{#}	Result	Record	High points	High rebounds	High assists	Site (attendance) city, state
Non-conference regular season
November 3, 2025*; 6:00 p.m., ESPN+		Central Connecticut	W 71–50	1–0	15 – Tied	9 – Scott	5 – Tied	Chace Athletic Center (150); Smithfield, RI
November 7, 2025*; 6:00 p.m., ESPN+		Cornell	W 64–38	2–0	18 – Mancini	12 – Scott	3 – Tied	Chace Athletic Center (150); Smithfield, RI
November 11, 2025*; 7:00 p.m., ESPN+		at Marist	W 66–56	3–0	17 – Nyborg	13 – Scott	8 – Mancini	McCann Arena (524); Poughkeepsie, NY
November 15, 2025*; 5:00 p.m., ESPN+		Rider	W 81–57	4–0	24 – Mancini	9 – Tied	5 – Mancini	Chace Athletic Center (205); Smithfield, RI
November 19, 2025*; 4:00 p.m., ESPN+		at Merrimack	W 80–73	5–0	25 – Scott	18 – Scott	6 – Mancini	Bert Hammel Court (487); North Andover, MA
November 22, 2025*; 6:00 p.m., ESPN+		at Stonehill	W 77–48	6–0	16 – Scott	8 – Nyborg	7 – Mancini	Merkert Gymnasium (143); Easton, MA
November 26, 2025*; 12:00 p.m., ESPN+		at Boston University	W 83–56	7–0	24 – Adams	11 – Scott	6 – Mancini	Case Gym (630); Boston, MA
November 30, 2025*; 1:00 p.m., ESPN+		at Providence	L 53–62	7–1	16 – Mancini	11 – Scott	4 – Mancini	Alumni Hall (715); Providence, RI
December 3, 2025*; 4:30 p.m., ESPN+		at Yale	L 48–61	7–2	18 – Rubino	8 – Nyborg	2 – Tied	John J. Lee Amphitheater (231); New Haven, CT
December 7, 2025*; 2:00 p.m., ESPN+		Holy Cross	L 41–53	7–3	10 – Scott	9 – Rubino	3 – Mancini	Chace Athletic Center (207); Smithfield, RI
December 9, 2025*; 6:00 p.m., ESPN+		at Boston College	W 80–71	8–3	28 – Mancini	6 – Tied	6 – Boba	Conte Forum (488); Boston, MA
December 19, 2025*; 11:00 a.m., ESPN+		Georgian Court	W 94–26	9–3	22 – Scott	9 – Scott	6 – Tied	Chace Athletic Center (141); Smithfield, RI
December 21, 2025*; 1:00 p.m., ESPN+		Franklin Pierce	W 72–45	10–3	18 – Mancini	8 – Tied	6 – Rubino	Chace Athletic Center (173); Smithfield, RI
America East regular season
January 1, 2026; 6:00 p.m., ESPN+		New Hampshire	W 45–31	11–3 (1–0)	12 – Nyborg	10 – Nyborg	3 – Mancini	Chace Athletic Center (207); Smithfield, RI
January 3, 2026; 2:00 p.m., ESPN+		Maine	W 82–73	12–3 (2–0)	19 – Mancini	11 – Scott	6 – Adams	Chace Athletic Center (157); Smithfield, RI
January 8, 2026; 6:00 p.m., ESPN+		at UMass Lowell	W 80–38	13–3 (3–0)	21 – Rubino	7 – Scott	5 – Tied	Kennedy Family Athletic Complex (131); Lowell, MA
January 10, 2026; 2:00 p.m., ESPN+		Albany	W 62–55	14–3 (4–0)	18 – Scott	12 – Scott	5 – Mancini	Chace Athletic Center (107); Smithfield, RI
January 15, 2026; 12:00 p.m., ESPN+		at UMBC	L 47–55	14–4 (4–1)	11 – Rubino	13 – Rubino	2 – Tied	Chesapeake Employers Insurance Arena (3,167); Baltimore, MD
January 17, 2026; 2:00 p.m., ESPN+		NJIT	L 65–78	14–5 (4–2)	19 – Nyborg	11 – Adams	6 – Mancini	Chace Athletic Center (167); Smithfield, RI
January 24, 2026; 2:00 p.m., ESPN+		at Vermont	L 53–71	14–6 (4–3)	13 – Mancini	6 – Tied	4 – Adams	Patrick Gymnasium (1,538); Burlington, VT
January 29, 2026; 6:00 p.m., ESPN+		Binghamton	L 64–66	14–7 (4–4)	16 – Scott	14 – Scott	5 – Boba	Chace Athletic Center (167); Smithfield, RI
January 31, 2026; 1:00 p.m., ESPN+		at New Hampshire	W 51–45	15–7 (5–4)	14 – Nyborg	7 – Adams	3 – Tied	Lundholm Gymnasium (337); Durham, NH
February 5, 2026; 11:00 a.m., ESPN+		at Albany	W 50–44	16–7 (6–4)	13 – Adams	6 – Tied	4 – Rubino	Broadview Center (3,899); Albany, NY
February 7, 2026; 1:00 p.m., ESPN+		at Maine	L 56–64	16–8 (6–5)	15 – Mancini	8 – Tied	6 – Mancini	Memorial Gymnasium (1,197); Orono, ME
February 12, 2026; 6:00 p.m., ESPN+		UMass Lowell	W 77–36	17–8 (7–5)	25 – Scott	13 – Scott	5 – Tied	Chace Athletic Center (167); Smithfield, RI
February 14, 2026; 4:00 p.m., ESPN+		Vermont	L 45–52	17–9 (7–6)	16 – Mancini	12 – Scott	3 – Mancini	Chace Athletic Center (179); Smithfield, RI
February 19, 2026; 6:00 p.m., ESPN+		at Binghamton	W 63–60	18–9 (8–6)	24 – Scott	11 – Scott	3 – Tied	Dr. Bai Lee Court (1,146); Vestal, NY
February 26, 2026; 4:30 p.m., ESPN+		UMBC	L 59–65 ^{2OT}	18–10 (8–7)	22 – Rubino	8 – Scott	3 – Tied	Chace Athletic Center (525); Smithfield, RI
February 28, 2026; 4:30 p.m., ESPN+		at NJIT	L 42–75	18–11 (8–8)	13 – Rubino	10 – Scott	3 – Mancini	Wellness and Events Center (434); Newark, NJ
America East tournament
March 5, 2026; 6:07 p.m., ESPN+	(6)	at (3) Binghamton; Quarterfinals	L 44–45	18–12	11 – Scott	7 – Scott	2 – Tied	Dr. Bai Lee Court (2,030); Vestal, NY
*Non-conference game. ^{#}Rankings from AP Poll. (#) Tournament seedings in parentheses. All times are in Eastern Time.

== See also ==
- 2025–26 Bryant Bulldogs men's basketball team
