= 2025–26 Maine Black Bears women's basketball team =

American college basketball season

2025–26 Maine Black Bears women's basketball
- Conference: America East Conference
- Record: 19–13 (12–4 America East)
- Head coach: Amy Vachon (9th season)
- Associate head coach: Courtney England
- Assistant coaches: Tom Biskup; Tanesha Sutton
- Home arena: Memorial Gymnasium

2025–26 America East Conference women's basketball standings
	Conf.				Overall
Team	W		L	PCT	W		L	PCT
Vermont †	13	–	3	.813	27	–	8	.771
Maine	12	–	4	.750	19	–	13	.594
Binghamton	10	–	6	.625	20	–	13	.606
UMBC	10	–	6	.625	17	–	15	.531
NJIT	9	–	7	.563	19	–	13	.594
Bryant	8	–	8	.500	18	–	12	.600
New Hampshire	4	–	12	.250	10	–	20	.333
Albany	4	–	12	.250	14	–	16	.467
UMass Lowell	2	–	14	.125	8	–	21	.276
† 2026 AmEast tournament winner

The 2025–26 Maine Black Bears women's basketball team represented the University of Maine during the 2025–26 NCAA Division I women's basketball season. The Black Bears, led by ninth-year head coach Amy Vachon, played their home games at Memorial Gymnasium in Orono, Maine as members of the America East Conference.

== Previous season ==
The Black Bears finished the 2024–25 season 15–16 and 9–7 in America East play, earning them a bid to the America East tournament as the No. 4 seed. They beat No. 5 NJIT in the quarterfinals before losing in the semifinals to No. 1 Albany.

== Offseason ==
=== Departures ===
Maine Departures
Name	Num	Pos.	Height	Year	Hometown	Reason for Departure
Sera Hodgson	0	G	6'0"	Senior	Rindge, NH	Graduated
Olivia Rockwood	1	G	5'7"	Graduate	Windsor, VT	Graduated
Jaycie Christopher	4	G	5'10"	Junior	Skowhegan, ME	Transferred to Southern Maine (DIII)
Ona Alarcon	9	F	6'3"	Freshman	Barcelona, Spain	TBD; not listed on roster
Caroline Bornemann	13	G/F	5'10"	Graduate	Hørsholm, Denmark	Graduated
Paula Gallego	15	G	6'0"	Senior	Barcelona, Spain	Graduated
Caroline Dotsey	25	F	6'2"	Sophomore	Havertown, PA	Transferred to Butler
Idan Shush	45	G	5'8"	Senior	Gedera, Israel	Graduated

=== Incoming transfers ===
Maine Incoming Transfers
Name	Num	Pos.	Height	Year	Hometown	Previous School
Lizzy Gruber	8	C	6'4"	Junior	Gardiner, ME	Saint Joseph's
Kaliyah Sain	45	F	6'0"	Junior	Cedar Rapids, IA	Lindenwood

=== Recruiting class ===
There was no college recruiting class for the class of 2025.

== Roster ==
2025–26 Maine Black Bears women's basketball team
Players
Coaches

Pos.	#	Name	Height	Year	Previous school	Hometown
G	2	Emmie Streams	5 ft 4 in (1.63 m)	Jr	Bangor High School	Veazie, ME
G	3	Izzy Allen	5 ft 11 in (1.8 m)	So	Central High School	Corinth, ME
G	5	Amiyah Donaldson	5 ft 7 in (1.7 m)	RS Sr	Lutheran High School East; Western Nebraska Community College	Cleveland, OH
G	6	Asta Blauenfeldt	5 ft 6 in (1.68 m)	Sr	Seattle	Kongens Lyngby, Denmark
C	8	Lizzy Gruber	6 ft 4 in (1.93 m)	Jr	Gardiner High School; Saint Joseph's	Gardiner, ME
G	12	Sarah Talon	5 ft 10 in (1.78 m)	Sr	Windham High School	Windham, ME
C	15	Abby Price	6 ft 4 in (1.93 m)	Fr	Grandview Preparatory School	Boca Raton, FL
G	23	Maddie Fitzpatrick	5 ft 11 in (1.8 m)	RS Fr	Cheverus High School	Cumberland, ME
F	31	Bailey Breen	6 ft 3 in (1.91 m)	Fr	Montverde Academy	South Thomaston, ME
G	32	Olivia Alvarez	5 ft 8 in (1.73 m)	Fr	IES Carmen Conde	Madrid, Spain
F	33	Adrianna Smith	6 ft 0 in (1.83 m)	RS Sr	Bishop O'Connell High School	Reston, VA
G/F	34	Mackenzie Mori	5 ft 11 in (1.8 m)	Fr	Hamden Hall Country Day School	Wethersfield, CT
G	35	Lala Woods	5 ft 8 in (1.73 m)	Fr	Wheeling Park High School	Wheeling, WV
F	45	Kaliyah Sain	6 ft 0 in (1.83 m)	Jr	John F. Kennedy High School; Kirkwood Community College; Lindenwood	Cedar Rapids, IA

Head coach

- Amy Vachon (Maine)

Assistant coach(es)

- Courtney England (Maine)
- Tom Biskup (Maine)
- Tanesha Sutton (Maine)

Legend

- (C) Team captain
- (S) Suspended
- (I) Ineligible
- (W) Walk-on
- Injured
- Current redshirt

Roster

== Schedule and results ==
Date time, TV	Rank^{#}	Opponent^{#}	Result	Record	High points	High rebounds	High assists	Site (attendance) city, state
Non-conference regular season
November 7, 2025*; 7:00 p.m., ESPN+		Saint Joseph's	L 62–63	0–1	25 – Smith	13 – Smith	4 – Alvarez	Memorial Gymnasium (1,230); Orono, ME
November 11, 2025*; 7:00 p.m., ACCNX		at No. 9 NC State	L 47–66	0–2	16 – Blauenfeldt	10 – Smith	6 – Smith	Reynolds Coliseum (4,575); Raleigh, NC
November 14, 2025*; 7:00 p.m., MASN/ESPN+		at VCU	L 77–81	0–3	26 – Sain	10 – Sain	7 – Smith	Stuart C. Siegel Center (814); Richmond, VA
November 17, 2025*; 6:00 p.m., ESPN+		Stonehill	W 79–53	1–3	26 – Smith	13 – Smith	4 – Tied	Memorial Gymnasium (922); Orono, ME
November 23, 2025*; 12:00 p.m., ESPN+		at Brown	L 39–70	1–4	10 – Blauenfeldt	4 – Tied	2 – Tied	Pizzitola Sports Center (217); Providence, RI
November 28, 2025*; 2:30 p.m., ESPN+		vs. UIC; Iona Turkey Tip-Off	L 54–64	1–5	14 – Blauenfeldt	8 – Smith	5 – Smith	Hynes Athletics Center (217); New Rochelle, NY
November 29, 2025*; 12:00 p.m., ESPN+		vs. Saint Francis; Iona Turkey Tip-Off	W 69–46	2–5	19 – Smith	13 – Smith	10 – Smith	Hynes Athletics Center (390); New Rochelle, NY
December 1, 2025*; 6:00 p.m., NESN/ESPN+		Boston University	W 54–45	3–5	24 – Smith	10 – Smith	4 – Tied	Memorial Gymnasium (1,111); Orono, ME
December 4, 2025*; 6:00 p.m., ESPN+		at Penn	L 35–58	3–6	10 – Smith	8 – Tied	3 – Smith	The Palestra (204); Philadelphia, PA
December 7, 2025*; 1:00 p.m., NESN/ESPN+		Rhode Island	L 56–69	3–7	26 – Smith	6 – Smith	4 – Tied	Memorial Gymnasium (1,143); Orono, ME
December 12, 2025*; 6:00 p.m., ESPN+		at Fairfield	L 51–74	3–8	19 – Smith	12 – Smith	3 – Smith	Leo D. Mahoney Arena (729); Fairfield, CT
December 14, 2025*; 1:00 p.m., ESPN+		at Quinnipiac	W 63–55	4–8	18 – Smith	20 – Smith	4 – Alvarez	M&T Bank Arena (263); Hamden, CT
December 21, 2025*; 12:00 p.m., ESPN+		at Harvard	W 59–57	5–8	21 – Smith	9 – Talon	7 – Smith	Lavietes Pavilion (676); Cambridge, MA
America East regular season
January 1, 2026; 6:00 p.m., NESN/ESPN+		at UMass Lowell	W 73–65	6–8 (1–0)	37 – Smith	6 – Tied	4 – Talon	Kennedy Family Athletic Complex (291); Lowell, MA
January 3, 2026; 2:00 p.m., ESPN+		at Bryant	L 73–82	6–9 (1–1)	27 – Smith	6 – Talon	5 – Smith	Chace Athletic Center (157); Smithfield, RI
January 8, 2026; 6:00 p.m., ESPN+		UMBC	W 58–43	7–9 (2–1)	19 – Smith	11 – Smith	6 – Smith	Memorial Gymnasium (809); Orono, ME
January 10, 2026; 1:00 p.m., ESPN+		NJIT	W 86–67	8–9 (3–1)	30 – Smith	13 – Smith	8 – Smith	Memorial Gymnasium (1,113); Orono, ME
January 15, 2026; 6:00 p.m., ESPN+		Vermont	L 53–64	8–10 (3–2)	15 – Tied	7 – Smith	5 – Tied	Memorial Gymnasium (934); Orono, ME
January 17, 2026; 1:00 p.m., ESPN+		at New Hampshire	W 73–51	9–10 (4–2)	30 – Smith	9 – Smith	4 – Smith	Lundholm Gymnasium (422); Durham, NH
January 22, 2026; 6:00 p.m., ESPN+		at Albany	W 65–60	10–10 (5–2)	25 – Smith	9 – Smith	7 – Smith	Broadview Center (1,051); Albany, NY
January 24, 2026; 2:00 p.m., ESPN+		at Binghamton	L 57–62	10–11 (5–3)	29 – Smith	7 – Smith	3 – Talon	Dr. Bai Lee Court (1,458); Vestal, NY
January 31, 2026; 1:00 p.m., ESPN+		UMass Lowell	W 92–42	11–11 (6–3)	26 – Blauenfeldt	11 – Smith	8 – Smith	Memorial Gymnasium (1,165); Orono, ME
February 5, 2026; 11:00 a.m., ESPN+		at Vermont	W 55–46	12–11 (7–3)	21 – Blauenfeldt	13 – Smith	5 – Smith	Patrick Gymnasium (2,549); Burlington, VT
February 7, 2026; 1:00 p.m., NESN/ESPN+		Bryant	W 64–56	13–11 (8–3)	29 – Smith	11 – Smith	4 – Talon	Memorial Gymnasium (1,197); Orono, ME
February 12, 2026; 6:30 p.m., ESPN+		at UMBC	W 56–55	14–11 (9–3)	25 – Smith	13 – Smith	3 – Gruber	Chesapeake Employers Insurance Arena (1,540); Baltimore, MD
February 14, 2026; 12:00 p.m., ESPN+		at NJIT	L 42–63	14–12 (9–4)	24 – Smith	15 – Smith	2 – Tied	Wellness and Events Center (281); Newark, NJ
February 21, 2026; 1:00 p.m., ESPN+		New Hampshire	W 67–61	15–12 (10–4)	35 – Smith	14 – Smith	5 – Smith	Memorial Gymnasium (1,151); Orono, ME
February 26, 2026; 6:00 p.m., ESPN+		Albany	W 60–59	16–12 (11–4)	20 – Smith	8 – Smith	12 – Smith	Memorial Gymnasium (1,168); Orono, ME
February 28, 2026; 1:00 p.m., ESPN+		Binghamton	W 74–67	17–12 (12–4)	21 – Smith	17 – Smith	6 – Smith	Memorial Gymnasium (1,172); Orono, ME
America East tournament
March 5, 2026; 6:00 p.m., ESPN+	(2)	(7) New Hampshire; Quarterfinals	W 77–58	18–12	35 – Smith	15 – Smith	5 – Smith	Memorial Gymnasium (1,157); Orono, ME
March 9, 2026; 6:00 p.m., ESPN+	(2)	(3) Binghamton; Semifinals	W 60–56	19–12	26 – Smith	12 – Smith	4 – Smith	Memorial Gymnasium (1,307); Orono, ME
March 13, 2026; 5:00 p.m., ESPNU	(2)	at (1) Vermont; Championship	L 43–61	19–13	22 – Smith	15 – Smith	4 – Smith	Patrick Gymnasium (2,247); Burlington, VT
*Non-conference game. ^{#}Rankings from AP Poll. (#) Tournament seedings in parentheses. All times are in Eastern.

== See also ==
- 2025–26 Maine Black Bears men's basketball team
