= 2025–26 NJIT Highlanders women's basketball team =

American college basketball season

2025–26 NJIT Highlanders women's basketball

WNIT, Second Round
- Conference: America East Conference
- Record: 19–13 (9–7 AmEast)
- Head coach: Mike Lane (8th season)
- Assistant coaches: Colleen Moriarty; Payce Lange; Kelly Guarino; Jenesis Alverio
- Home arena: Wellness and Events Center

2025–26 America East Conference women's basketball standings
	Conf.				Overall
Team	W		L	PCT	W		L	PCT
Vermont †	13	–	3	.813	27	–	8	.771
Maine	12	–	4	.750	19	–	13	.594
Binghamton	10	–	6	.625	20	–	13	.606
UMBC	10	–	6	.625	17	–	15	.531
NJIT	9	–	7	.563	19	–	13	.594
Bryant	8	–	8	.500	18	–	12	.600
New Hampshire	4	–	12	.250	10	–	20	.333
Albany	4	–	12	.250	14	–	16	.467
UMass Lowell	2	–	14	.125	8	–	21	.276
† 2026 AmEast tournament winner

The 2025–26 NJIT Highlanders women's basketball team represented the New Jersey Institute of Technology during the 2025–26 NCAA Division I women's basketball season. The Highlanders, led by eighth-year head coach Mike Lane, played their home games at the Wellness and Events Center in Newark, New Jersey as members of the America East Conference.

== Previous season ==
The Highlanders finished the 2024–25 season 11–18, 8–8 in AmEast play, to finish in fifth place. They were defeated by Maine in the quarterfinals of the AmEast tournament.

== Offseason ==
=== Departures ===
NJIT Departures
Name	Num	Pos.	Height	Year	Hometown	Reason for Departure
Mayah Alford	2	G	5'9"	Freshman	Levittown, PA	Transferred to Mercer County (JUCO)
Enya Maguire	8	G	5'5"	Graduate	Belfast, Northern Ireland	Graduated
Aria Myers	11	G	5'9"	Graduate	Cedar Grove, NJ	Graduated
Trinity Williams	21	F	6'1"	Senior	Upper Black Eddy, PA	Graduated
Reese Vaughan	22	G	5'9"	Senior	Endwell, NY	Graduated
Angelina Banas	55	F	6'0"	Sophomore	Columbus, NJ	TBD; entered transfer portal

=== Incoming transfers ===
NJIT incoming transfers
Name	Num	Pos.	Height	Year	Hometown	Previous School
Ava Locklear	45	F	5'11"	Sophomore	Tiffin, IA	Saginaw Valley State (DII)

=== Recruiting class ===
There was no recruiting class for the class of 2025.

== Preseason ==
On October 20, 2025, the America East Conference released their preseason poll. NJIT was picked to finish fifth in the conference.

=== Preseason rankings ===
AmEast Preseason Poll
Place	Team	Votes
1	Vermont	63 (7)
2	Maine	55 (2)
3	Bryant	46
4	Albany	42
5	NJIT	37
6	Binghamton	26
7	New Hampshire	24
8	UMBC	23
9	UMass Lowell	8
(#) first-place votes

=== Preseason All-America East Team ===
Preseason All-America East Team
Player	Year	Position
Alejandra Zuniga	Senior	Guard

== Roster ==
2025–26 NJIT Highlanders women's basketball team
Players
Coaches

Pos.	#	Name	Height	Year	Previous school	Hometown
G	3	Allison Cannon	5 ft 9 in (1.75 m)	So	Holmdel High School	Holmdel, NJ
F	5	Audrey Kormann	6 ft 2 in (1.88 m)	Jr	Maple Grove Senior High School	Maple Grove, MN
G	8	Mia Gestosani	5 ft 8 in (1.73 m)	Fr	Mount St. Mary Academy	Somerset, NJ
G	10	Marissa Gingrich	5 ft 7 in (1.7 m)	Jr	Mifflin County High School	Mifflin County, PA
G	11	Addison Shen	6 ft 0 in (1.83 m)	Fr	Concord-Carlisle High School	Concord, MA
G	13	Piper Engelby	5 ft 11 in (1.8 m)	So	Andover High School	Andover, MN
G	15	Madilyn Dogs	6 ft 0 in (1.83 m)	Jr	Kewaskum High School	Kewaskum, WI
F	22	Lauren Lee	6 ft 2 in (1.88 m)	Fr	River Ridge High School	New Port Richey, FL
F	23	Mackenzie Wright-Rawls	6 ft 0 in (1.83 m)	Jr	Central York High School	York, PA
F	24	Kyleigh Welsh	6 ft 2 in (1.88 m)	RS Jr	Clearwater High School	Clearwater, FL
G	25	Avery O'Roke	5 ft 7 in (1.7 m)	Sr	Millbrook High School	Winchester, VA
F	30	Olivia O'Meally	6 ft 1 in (1.85 m)	So	Niskayuna High School	Niskayuna, NY
G	32	Olivia Kulyk	6 ft 1 in (1.85 m)	So	Mercyhurst Preparatory School	Edinboro, PA
G	34	Alejandra Zuniga	5 ft 6 in (1.68 m)	Sr	IES Jose Garcia Nieto	Madrid, Spain
F	45	Ava Locklear	5 ft 11 in (1.8 m)	So	Clear Creek Amana High School	Tiffin, IA

Head coach

- Mike Lane (Notre Dame)

Assistant coach(es)

- Colleen Moriarty (UMass Dartmouth)
- Payce Lange (Kean)
- Kelly Guarino (NJIT)
- Jenesis Alverio (Saint Peter's)

Legend

- (C) Team captain
- (S) Suspended
- (I) Ineligible
- (W) Walk-on
- Injured
- Current redshirt

Roster
Last update: December 23, 2025

== Schedule and results ==
Date time, TV	Rank^{#}	Opponent^{#}	Result	Record	High points	High rebounds	High assists	Site (attendance) city, state
Non-conference regular season
November 3, 2025*; 7:00 p.m., ESPN+		at Sacred Heart	W 64–51	1–0	24 – Zuniga	9 – Locklear	7 – Zuniga	William H. Pitt Center (721); Fairfield, CT
November 7, 2025*; 5:00 p.m., ESPN+		at Fordham	W 82–78	2–0	25 – Kulyk	6 – Tied	7 – Zuniga	Rose Hill Gymnasium; Bronx, NY
November 11, 2025*; 6:00 p.m., ESPN+		Wagner	W 78–58	3–0	23 – Gingrich	7 – Gingrich	3 – Gingrich	Wellness and Events Center (181); Newark, NJ
November 14, 2025*; 6:00 p.m., B1G+		at Minnesota	L 39–88	3–1	11 – Cannon	6 – Locklear	3 – Gingrich	Williams Arena (2,973); Minneapolis, MN
November 16, 2025*; 2:00 p.m., MidcoSN+		at St. Thomas	W 68–63	4–1	22 – Gingrich	6 – Tied	4 – Cannon	Lee & Penny Anderson Arena (389); St. Paul, MN
November 19, 2025*; 6:00 p.m., ESPN+		Saint Peter's	W 81–33	5–1	15 – Kulyk	10 – Locklear	4 – Cannon	Wellness and Events Center (179); Newark, NJ
November 22, 2025*; 1:00 p.m., ESPN+		Drexel	W 73–66	6–1	24 – Kulyk	10 – Locklear	4 – Cannon	Wellness and Events Center (232); Newark, NJ
November 25, 2025*; 6:00 p.m., ESPN+		Fairleigh Dickinson	L 43–71	6–2	9 – Tied	7 – Locklear	4 – Tied	Wellness and Events Center (188); Newark, NJ
November 30, 2025*; 1:00 p.m., ESPN+		Lafayette	W 71–60	7–2	30 – Kulyk	16 – Locklear	11 – Cannon	Wellness and Events Center (279); Newark, NJ
December 3, 2025*; 5:00 p.m., FloCollege		at Monmouth	L 68–77	7–3	24 – Locklear	14 – Locklear	5 – Zuniga	OceanFirst Bank Center (547); West Long Branch, NJ
December 7, 2025*; 1:00 p.m., ESPN+		Manhattan	W 71–54	8–3	18 – Locklear	7 – Tied	4 – Tied	Wellness and Events Center (191); Newark, NJ
December 11, 2025*; 6:00 p.m., ESPN+		Dartmouth	L 60–61	8–4	15 – Tied	9 – Locklear	5 – Zuniga	Wellness and Events Center (201); Newark, NJ
December 29, 2025*; 2:00 p.m., ESPN+		at Delaware State	W 75–62	9–4	17 – Tied	10 – Kulyk	4 – Gingrich	Memorial Hall (56); Dover, DE
America East regular season
January 1, 2026; 6:30 p.m., ESPN+		at UMBC	W 80–75	10–4 (1–0)	39 – Zuniga	9 – Locklear	3 – Kulyk	Chesapeake Employers Insurance Arena (410); Catonsville, MD
January 3, 2026; 1:00 p.m., ESPN+		Binghamton	L 71–75	10–5 (1–1)	20 – Kulyk	14 – Locklear	8 – Zuniga	Wellness and Events Center (244); Newark, NJ
January 8, 2026; 6:00 p.m., ESPN+		at New Hampshire	W 69–62	11–5 (2–1)	19 – Zuniga	14 – Locklear	2 – Gingrich	Lundholm Gym (226); Durham, NH
January 10, 2026; 1:00 p.m., ESPN+		at Maine	L 67–86	11–6 (2–2)	22 – Zuniga	8 – Gingrich	5 – Kulyk	Memorial Gymnasium (1,113); Orono, ME
January 15, 2026; 11:00 a.m., ESPN+		UMass Lowell	W 68–57	12–6 (3–2)	22 – Kulyk	13 – Locklear	10 – Zuniga	Wellness and Events Center (2,326); Newark, NJ
January 17, 2026; 2:00 p.m., ESPN+		at Bryant	W 78–65	13–6 (4–2)	27 – Zuniga	8 – Zuniga	4 – Zuniga	Chace Athletic Center (167); Smithfield, RI
January 22, 2026; 6:00 p.m., ESPN+		UMBC	L 51–52	13–7 (4–3)	22 – Zuniga	6 – Tied	2 – Zuniga	Wellness and Events Center (334); Newark, NJ
January 29, 2026; 6:00 p.m., ESPN+		Albany	L 54–71	13–8 (4–4)	17 – Locklear	6 – Tied	5 – Zuniga	Wellness and Events Center (255); Newark, NJ
January 31, 2026; 12:00 p.m., ESPN+		Vermont	L 61–63	13–9 (4–5)	27 – Zuniga	8 – Locklear	3 – Zuniga	Wellness and Events Center (376); Newark, NJ
February 5, 2026; 6:00 p.m., ESPN+		at UMass Lowell	W 69–60	14–9 (5–5)	20 – Zuniga	8 – Dogs	9 – Cannon	Kennedy Family Athletic Complex (138); Lowell, MA
February 7, 2026; 12:00 p.m., ESPN+		at Binghamton	L 67–72	14–10 (5–6)	19 – Zuniga	10 – Locklear	4 – Gingrich	Events Center (1,921); Vestal, NY
February 12, 2026; 6:00 p.m., ESPN+		New Hampshire	W 55–47	15–10 (6–6)	17 – Cannon	9 – Dogs	3 – Tied	Wellness and Events Center (278); Newark, NJ
February 14, 2026; 12:00 p.m., ESPN+		Maine	W 63–42	16–10 (7–6)	19 – Kulyk	12 – Locklear	5 – Cannon	Wellness and Events Center (281); Newark, NJ
February 19, 2026; 6:30 p.m., ESPN+		at Albany	W 70–64	17–10 (8–6)	25 – Zuniga	7 – Kulyk	3 – Tied	Broadview Center (1,081); Albany, NY
February 21, 2026; 4:00 p.m., ESPN+		at Vermont	L 37–67	17–11 (8–7)	13 – Zuniga	6 – Locklear	1 – Tied	Patrick Gym (1,162); Burlington, VT
February 28, 2026; 4:30 pm, ESPN+		Bryant	W 75–42	18–11 (9–7)	21 – Kulyk	10 – Locklear	8 – Zuniga	Wellness and Events Center (434); Newark, NJ
America East tournament
March 5, 2026; 6:30 p.m., ESPN+	(5)	at (4) UMBC; Quarterfinals	L 65–66	18–12	16 – Tied	6 – Zuniga	4 – Zuniga	Chesapeake Employers Insurance Arena (1,029); Baltimore, MD
WNIT
March 19, 2026*; 7:00 p.m., ESPN+		at Merrimack; Round 1	W 68–65	19–12	20 – Zuniga	10 – Locklear	5 – Zuniga	Merrimack Athletics Complex (317); North Andover, MA
March 22, 2026*; 2:00 p.m., ESPN+		at Army; Round 2	L 52–59	19–13	17 – Zuniga	7 – Kulyk	3 – Cannon	Christl Arena (310); West Point, NY
*Non-conference game. ^{#}Rankings from AP Poll. (#) Tournament seedings in parentheses. All times are in Eastern.
