= 2025–26 Albany Great Danes women's basketball team =

American college basketball season

2025–26 Albany Great Danes women's basketball
- Conference: America East Conference
- Record: 14–16 (4–12 AmEast)
- Head coach: Colleen Mullen (8th season)
- Associate head coach: Megan Methven
- Assistant coaches: Catherine Cassidy; Michelle Holmes; Nan Garcia
- Home arena: Broadview Center

2025–26 America East Conference women's basketball standings
	Conf.				Overall
Team	W		L	PCT	W		L	PCT
Vermont †	13	–	3	.813	27	–	8	.771
Maine	12	–	4	.750	19	–	13	.594
Binghamton	10	–	6	.625	20	–	13	.606
UMBC	10	–	6	.625	17	–	15	.531
NJIT	9	–	7	.563	19	–	13	.594
Bryant	8	–	8	.500	18	–	12	.600
New Hampshire	4	–	12	.250	10	–	20	.333
Albany	4	–	12	.250	14	–	16	.467
UMass Lowell	2	–	14	.125	8	–	21	.276
† 2026 AmEast tournament winner

The 2025–26 Albany Great Danes women's basketball team represented the University at Albany, SUNY during the 2025–26 NCAA Division I women's basketball season. The Great Danes, led by eighth-year head coach Colleen Mullen, played their home games at the Broadview Center in Albany, New York as members of the America East Conference.

== Previous season ==
The Great Danes finished the 2024–25 season 27–7, 14–2 in AmEast play, to finish as America East regular-season champions. They defeated New Hampshire and Maine, before falling to Vermont in the AmEast tournament championship game. As a regular-season champion who failed to win their conference tournament, the Great Danes were granted an automatic bid to the WBIT, where they were defeated by Saint Joseph's in the first round.

== Offseason ==
=== Departures ===
Albany departures
Name	Num	Pos.	Height	Year	Hometown	Reason for departure
Makayla Noble	0	F	5'10"	Freshman	Salisbury, NC	Transferred to Barton (DII)
Laycee Drake	2	G	5'6"	Senior	Hancock, NY	Transferred to St. Bonaventure
Lily Phillips	3	G	5'11"	Graduate	Greenwich, NY	Graduated
Kaci Donovan	4	F	6'1"	Graduate	Owego, NY	Graduated
Manuela Piljevic	6	G	5'10"	Freshman	Cordeaux Heights, Australia	Transferred to Dodge City (NJCAA)
Kayla Cooper	20	F	6'0"	Graduate	Frederick, MD	Graduated
Meghan Huerter	23	G	5'11"	Senior	Clifton Park, NY	Graduated
Abby Ray	24	G	5'8"	Senior	Saratoga Springs, NY	Graduated
Jessica Tomasetti	55	G	5'5"	Graduate	North Potomac, MD	Graduated

=== Incoming transfers ===
Albany transfers
Name	Num	Pos.	Height	Year	Hometown	Previous school
Júlia Palomo Vicente	35	G	5'7"	Graduate	La Seu d'Urgell, Spain	Evansville
Lara Langermann	55	G	5'7"	Junior	Breckerfeld, Germany	New Mexico

=== Recruiting class ===
There was no recruiting class for the class of 2025.

== Preseason ==
On October 20, 2025, the America East Conference released their preseason poll. Albany was picked to finish fourth in the conference.

=== Preseason rankings ===
AmEast Preseason Poll
Place	Team	Votes
1	Vermont	63 (7)
2	Maine	55 (2)
3	Bryant	46
4	Albany	42
5	NJIT	37
6	Binghamton	26
7	New Hampshire	24
8	UMBC	23
9	UMass Lowell	8
(#) first-place votes

=== Preseason All-America East Team ===
No players were named to the Preseason All-America East Team.

== Roster ==
2025–26 Albany Great Danes women's basketball team
Players
Coaches

Pos.	#	Name	Height	Year	Previous school	Hometown
F	1	Bella Stuart	5 ft 11 in (1.8 m)	GS	New Hampshire	Clifton Park, NY
F	2	Nila Giraud	6 ft 0 in (1.83 m)	Fr	Immaculate Conception High School	Rahway, NJ
G	7	Anaïs Levasseur	5 ft 8 in (1.73 m)	Fr	Cégep Champlain Saint-Lambert	Quebec City, Quebec
F	9	Amaya Stewart	6 ft 1 in (1.85 m)	Fr	Wyomissing Area Junior/Senior High School	West Reading, PA
G	10	Laura Vera	5 ft 11 in (1.8 m)	Fr	Colegio San José	Estepona, Spain
G	12	Emma Hákonardóttir	5 ft 11 in (1.8 m)	So	Fjolbrautaskoli Sudurlands	Thorlakshofn, Iceland
G	13	Martina Borrellas	6 ft 1 in (1.85 m)	So	Bon Soleil	Barcelona, Spain
C	21	Gabriela Falcão	6 ft 1 in (1.85 m)	Sr	La Salle	Figueira da Foz, Portugal
G	33	Delanie Hill	5 ft 7 in (1.7 m)	So	Providence High School	Charlotte, NC
G	35	Júlia Palomo Vicente	5 ft 7 in (1.7 m)	GS	Evansville	La Seu d'Urgell, Spain
F	46	Emma Zuccon	6 ft 0 in (1.83 m)	Fr	Istituto Bruno-Franchetti	Treviso, Italy
G	55	Lara Langermann	5 ft 7 in (1.7 m)	Jr	New Mexico	Breckerfeld, Germany

Head coach

- Colleen Mullen (New Hampshire)

Assistant coach(es)

- Megan Methven (Stonehill)
- Catherine Cassidy (Plattsburgh State)
- Michelle Holmes (American)
- Nan Garcia (Toledo)

Legend

- (C) Team captain
- (S) Suspended
- (I) Ineligible
- (W) Walk-on
- Injured
- Current redshirt

Roster
Last update: December 19, 2025

== Schedule and results ==
Date time, TV	Rank^{#}	Opponent^{#}	Result	Record	High points	High rebounds	High assists	Site (attendance) city, state
Non-conference regular season
November 4, 2025*; 6:30 p.m., ESPN+		Marist	W 74–46	1–0	20 – Hill	6 – Borrellas	7 – Levasseur	Broadview Center (1,338); Albany, NY
November 7, 2025*; 7:00 p.m., ACCNX		at Syracuse	L 45–64	1–1	17 – Hill	9 – Borrellas	6 – Palomo Vicente	JMA Wireless Dome (2,232); Syracuse, NY
November 10, 2025*; 6:30 p.m., ESPN+		Dartmouth	W 65–41	2–1	21 – Stewart	11 – Stewart	7 – Hill	Broadview Center (1,207); Albany, NY
November 15, 2025*; 5:30 p.m., ESPN+		at Rhode Island	L 52–64	2–2	11 – Palomo Vicente	6 – Borellas	4 – Stewart	Thomas M. Ryan Center (1,172); Kingston, RI
November 19, 2025*; 6:30 p.m., ESPN+		Siena	W 67–42	3–2	17 – Stewart	10 – Borellas	4 – Langermann	Broadview Center (1,631); Albany, NY
November 22, 2025*; 1:00 p.m., ESPN+		at St. Bonaventure	W 62–53	4–2	15 – Hill	7 – Tied	4 – Hill	Reilly Center (413); St. Bonaventure, NY
November 26, 2025*; 2:00 p.m., ESPN+		RPI	W 96–43	5–2	22 – Stewart	10 – Borellas	8 – Palomo Vicente	Broadview Center (960); Albany, NY
December 1, 2025*; 6:00 p.m., ESPN+		at Bucknell	W 65–62 ^{OT}	6–2	20 – Stewart	9 – Falcão	3 – Hill	Sojka Pavilion (240); Lewisburg, PA
December 3, 2025*; 11:00 a.m., ESPN+		at Sacred Heart	W 60–57	7–2	17 – Tied	7 – Stewart	4 – Langermann	William H. Pitt Center (723); Fairfield, CT
December 8, 2025*; 6:00 p.m., ESPN+		at Colgate	W 55–41	8–2	23 – Hill	8 – Borrellas	4 – Tied	Cotterell Court (N/A); Hamilton, NY
December 13, 2025*; 2:00 p.m., ESPN+		Boston University	W 62–46	9–2	18 – Hill	8 – Palomo Vicente	6 – Hill	Broadview Center (1,107); Albany, NY
December 18, 2025*; 7:30 p.m., SEC Network		at No. 11 Vanderbilt	L 35–64	9–3	15 – Hill	7 – Falcão	3 – Palomo Vicente	Memorial Gymnasium (2,221); Nashville, TN
December 21, 2025*; 12:00 p.m., ESPN+		Hofstra	W 52–43	10–3	14 – Hill	14 – Borrellas	6 – Falcão	Broadview Center (1,286); Albany, NY
America East regular season
January 1, 2026; 2:00 p.m., ESPN+		Vermont	L 56–72	10–4 (0–1)	33 – Hill	6 – Falcão	3 – Falcão	Broadview Center (1,243); Albany, NY
January 3, 2026; 2:00 p.m., ESPN+		UMass Lowell	W 74–62	11–4 (1–1)	19 – Hill	7 – Borrellas	5 – Tied	Broadview Center (1,486); Albany, NY
January 10, 2026; 2:00 p.m., ESPN+		at Bryant	L 55–62	11–5 (1–2)	13 – Borrellas	10 – Stewart	3 – Tied	Chace Athletic Center (107); Smithfield, RI
January 15, 2026; 11:00 a.m., ESPN+		at Binghamton	L 61–63	11–6 (1–3)	18 – Hill	9 – Borrellas	4 – Langermann	Dr. Bai Lee Court (4,671); Vestal, NY
January 17, 2026; 6:00 p.m., ESPN+		at Vermont	L 49–60	11–7 (1–4)	14 – Borrellas	6 – Tied	3 – Palomo Vicente	Patrick Gymnasium (966); Burlington, VT
January 22, 2026; 6:30 p.m., ESPN+		Maine	L 60–65	11–8 (1–5)	20 – Stewart	9 – Borrellas	3 – Tied	Broadview Center (1,051); Albany, NY
January 24, 2026; 2:00 p.m., ESPN+		New Hampshire	L 51–56	11–9 (1–6)	15 – Hill	9 – Falcão	4 – Falcão	Broadview Center (1,538); Albany, NY
January 29, 2026; 6:00 p.m., ESPN+		at NJIT	W 71–54	12–9 (2–6)	22 – Hill	9 – Palomo Vicente	10 – Falcão	Wellness and Events Center (255); Newark, NJ
January 31, 2026; 2:00 p.m., ESPN+		at UMBC	L 46–55 ^{OT}	12–10 (2–7)	10 – Borrellas	7 – Tied	6 – Falcão	Chesapeake Employers Insurance Arena (324); Baltimore, MD
February 5, 2026; 11:00 p.m., ESPN+		Bryant	L 44–50	12–11 (2–8)	12 – Langermann	7 – Tied	3 – Tied	Broadview Center (3,899); Albany, NY
February 7, 2026; 1:00 p.m., ESPN+		at UMass Lowell	L 45–58	12–12 (2–9)	23 – Stewart	10 – Borrellas	3 – Tied	Kennedy Family Athletic Complex (225); Lowell, MA
February 14, 2026; 7:00 p.m., ESPN+		Binghamton	W 52–41	13–12 (3–9)	13 – Palomo Vicente	5 – Stuart	3 – Tied	Broadview Center (1,312); Albany, NY
February 19, 2026; 6:30 p.m., ESPN+		NJIT	L 64–70	13–13 (3–10)	25 – Stewart	10 – Borrellas	6 – Borrellas	Broadview Center (1,081); Albany, NY
February 21, 2026; 4:00 p.m., ESPN+		UMBC	W 69–63 ^{2OT}	14–13 (4–10)	19 – Hill	7 – Palomo	3 – Tied	Broadview Center (1,306); Albany, NY
February 26, 2026; 6:00 p.m., ESPN+		at Maine	L 59–60	14–14 (4–11)	23 – Borrellas	11 – Borrellas	6 – Falcão	Memorial Gymnasium (1,168); Orono, ME
February 28, 2026; 1:00 p.m., ESPN+		at New Hampshire	L 42–45	14–15 (4–12)	19 – Stewart	9 – Hill	4 – Borrellas	Lundholm Gymnasium (401); Durham, NH
America East tournament
March 5, 2026; 6:00 p.m., ESPN+	(8)	at (1) Vermont; Quarterfinals	L 40–55	14–16	17 – Hill	13 – Borrellas	3 – Hill	Patrick Gymnasium (932); Burlington, VT
*Non-conference game. ^{#}Rankings from AP Poll. (#) Tournament seedings in parentheses. All times are in Eastern Time.

== See also ==
- 2025–26 Albany Great Danes men's basketball team
