= 2025–26 UMBC Retrievers women's basketball team =

American college basketball season

2025–26 UMBC Retrievers women's basketball
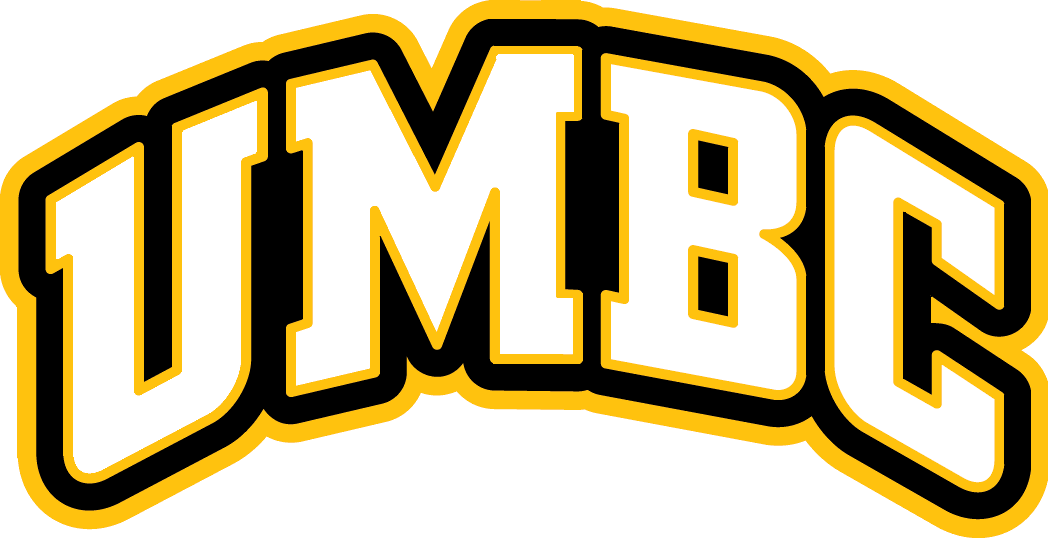

WNIT, Second Round
- Conference: America East Conference
- Record: 17–15 (10–6 America East)
- Head coach: Candice Hill (2nd season)
- Associate head coach: Delmar "Buck" Carey
- Assistant coaches: Reggie Daniels; Maggie Tien
- Home arena: Chesapeake Employers Insurance Arena

2025–26 America East Conference women's basketball standings
	Conf.				Overall
Team	W		L	PCT	W		L	PCT
Vermont †	13	–	3	.813	27	–	8	.771
Maine	12	–	4	.750	19	–	13	.594
Binghamton	10	–	6	.625	20	–	13	.606
UMBC	10	–	6	.625	17	–	15	.531
NJIT	9	–	7	.563	19	–	13	.594
Bryant	8	–	8	.500	18	–	12	.600
New Hampshire	4	–	12	.250	10	–	20	.333
Albany	4	–	12	.250	14	–	16	.467
UMass Lowell	2	–	14	.125	8	–	21	.276
† 2026 AmEast tournament winner

The 2025–26 UMBC Retrievers women's basketball team represented the University of Maryland, Baltimore County during the 2025–26 NCAA Division I women's basketball season. The Retrievers, led by second-year head coach Candice Hill, played their home games at the Chesapeake Employers Insurance Arena in Catonsville, Maryland as members of the America East Conference.

== Previous season ==
Under first-year head coach Candice Hill, who replaced coach Johnetta Hayes after four seasons with the program, the Retrievers finished the season 14–15 and 7–9 in America East play, tying with Binghamton. They clinched the No. 7 seed in the America East tournament, losing to Albany in the semifinals.

== Offseason ==
=== Departures ===
UMBC departures
Name	Num	Pos.	Height	Year	Hometown	Reason for departure
Yasmin Ott	0	G	5'7"	Graduate	Little Rock, AR	Graduated
Layla Marshall	2	G	5'8"	Freshman	Detroit, MI	Transferred to Walsh (DII)
Jaliena Sanchez	3	G	5'5"	Graduate	Springfield, MA	Graduated
Riley Donahue	4	G	5'10"	Graduate	Atlanta, GA	Graduated
Jordon Lewis	5	G/F	5'10"	Graduate	Houston, TX	Graduated
Talia Davis	21	F	6'0"	Graduate	Dedham, MA	Graduated
Jaden Walker	22	F	5'10"	Graduate	New Freedom, PA	Graduated
Laura Lacambra	33	C	6'2"	Junior	Viladecans, Spain	TBD; not listed on roster

=== Incoming transfers ===
UMBC incoming transfers
Name	Num	Pos.	Height	Year	Hometown	Previous school
Dagny Slomack	2	G	5'6"	Sophomore	South Orange, NJ	Central Connecticut
Delaney Yarborough	14	C	6'3"	Senior	Ellicott City, MD	North Carolina A&T
Gabby Scott	21	F	6'0"	Junior	Ellicott City, MD	Towson
Jade Tillman	24	F	6'1"	Junior	Rockville, MD	East Carolina

=== Recruiting class ===
There was no recruiting class for the class of 2025.

== Roster ==
2025–26 UMBC Retrievers women's basketball team
Players
Coaches

Pos.	#	Name	Height	Year	Previous school	Hometown
G	1	Tiara Bellamy	5 ft 7 in (1.7 m)	RS Jr	Saint Peter's	Plainfield, NJ
G	2	Dagny Slomack	5 ft 6 in (1.68 m)	So	Newark Academy; Central Connecticut	South Orange, NJ
G	3	Heidi Williams	6 ft 0 in (1.83 m)	Fr	Saint Frances Academy	Prince George's County, MD
G	4	Kennedy Austin	5 ft 9 in (1.75 m)	Fr	Maret School	Waldorf, MD
G	5	Sadaya Jones	5 ft 9 in (1.75 m)	Fr	Morgantown High School	Morgantown, WV
F	10	Alaina Williams	6 ft 1 in (1.85 m)	Jr	Brooks-DeBartolo Collegiate; Idaho State	Apollo Beach, FL
G	12	Lauren Thompson	5 ft 6 in (1.68 m)	So	Sacred Heart Academy	Branford, CT
G	13	Kenya Ramsey	6 ft 0 in (1.83 m)	So	Kempsville High School	Virginia Beach, VA
C	14	Delaney Yarborough	6 ft 3 in (1.91 m)	Sr	McDonogh School; Stony Brook; North Carolina A&T	Ellicott City, MD
G	15	Carmen Yánez	5 ft 6 in (1.68 m)	Sr	Institut Martí Dot	Las Palmas, Canary Islands
F/C	17	Maisie Crowley	6 ft 4 in (1.93 m)	Fr	Bishop McNamara High School	London, England
F	21	Gabby Scott	6 ft 0 in (1.83 m)	Jr	Howard High School; Towson	Ellicott City, MD
F	24	Jade Tillman	6 ft 1 in (1.85 m)	Jr	Our Lady of Good Counsel; East Carolina	Rockville, MD

Head coach

- Candice Hill (Loyola (MD))

Assistant coach(es)

- Delmar "Buck" Carey (Bowie State)
- Reggie Daniels (Hood)
- Maggie Tien (Washington Adventist)

Legend

- (C) Team captain
- (S) Suspended
- (I) Ineligible
- (W) Walk-on
- Injured
- Current redshirt

Roster

== Schedule and results ==
Date time, TV	Rank^{#}	Opponent^{#}	Result	Record	High points	High rebounds	High assists	Site (attendance) city, state
Non-conference regular season
November 3, 2025*; 6:30 p.m., ESPN+		Stevenson	W 90–49	1–0	22 – Tillman	11 – Yarborough	10 – Yánez	Chesapeake Employers Insurance Arena (1,157); Baltimore, MD
November 6, 2025*; 6:00 p.m., B1G+		at No. 10 Maryland	L 54–87	1–1	17 – Tillman	4 – Tied	5 – Yánez	Xfinity Center (5,462); College Park, MD
November 13, 2025*; 7:00 p.m., ACCNX		at Virginia	W 61–56	2–1	14 – Tied	7 – Tillman	4 – Yánez	John Paul Jones Arena (3,531); Charlottesville, VA
November 16, 2025*; 3:00 p.m., ESPN+		Brown	L 54–56	2–2	16 – Slomack	7 – Scott	2 – Tied	Chesapeake Employers Insurance Arena (775); Baltimore, MD
November 19, 2025*; 12:00 p.m., ESPN+		at Maryland Eastern Shore	L 54–68	2–3	11 – Tied	7 – Austin	3 – Yánez	Hytche Athletic Center (262); Princess Anne, MD
November 23, 2025*; 5:00 p.m., ESPN+		Towson	L 64–71	2–4	20 – Austin	10 – Tillman	2 – Tied	Chesapeake Employers Insurance Arena (731); Baltimore, MD
November 28, 2025*; 11:00 a.m., ESPN+		vs. FIU; FIU Thanksgiving Classic	L 76–86	2–5	24 – Austin	12 – Tillman	5 – Yánez	Ocean Bank Convocation Center; Miami, FL
November 30, 2025*; 11:00 a.m., ESPN+		vs. Presbyterian; FIU Thanksgiving Classic	W 68–48	3–5	12 – Tillman	7 – Tied	4 – Yánez	Ocean Bank Convocation Center (40); Miami, FL
December 6, 2025*; 2:00 p.m., ESPN+		at Morgan State	W 66–48	4–5	19 – Tied	8 – A. Williams	3 – Tied	Hill Field House (262); Baltimore, MD
December 9, 2025*; 8:00 p.m., ESPN+		Loyola Maryland	L 57–60	4–6	15 – Tillman	6 – A. Williams	3 – Tillman	Chesapeake Employers Insurance Arena (710); Baltimore, MD
December 21, 2025*; 12:00 p.m., ESPN+		at American	L 61–65	4–7	13 – Tillman	7 – Tillman	3 – Tied	Bender Arena (281); Washington, D.C.
December 30, 2025*; 6:30 p.m., ESPN+		Notre Dame of Maryland	W 104–22	5–7	23 – Tillman	11 – H. Williams	10 – Yánez	Chesapeake Employers Insurance Arena (521); Baltimore, MD
America East regular season
January 1, 2026; 6:30 p.m., ESPN+		NJIT	L 75–80	5–8 (0–1)	25 – Tillman	9 – Austin	5 – Yánez	Chesapeake Employers Insurance Arena (410); Baltimore, MD
January 8, 2026; 6:00 p.m., ESPN+		at Maine	L 43–58	5–9 (0–2)	16 – H. Williams	6 – Bellamy	4 – Bellamy	Memorial Gymnasium (809); Orono, ME
January 10, 2026; 1:00 p.m., ESPN+		at New Hampshire	W 58–47	6–9 (1–2)	17 – Tillman	6 – Tied	3 – Austin	Lundholm Gymnasium (201); Durham, NH
January 15, 2026; 12:00 p.m., ESPN+		Bryant	W 55–47	7–9 (2–2)	21 – Tillman	10 – Tillman	2 – Tied	Chesapeake Employers Insurance Arena (3,167); Baltimore, MD
January 17, 2026; 2:00 p.m., ESPN+		Binghamton	W 64–58	8–9 (3–2)	21 – Tillman	11 – Tillman	3 – Austin	Chesapeake Employers Insurance Arena (975); Baltimore, MD
January 22, 2026; 6:00 p.m., ESPN+		at NJIT	W 52–51	9–9 (4–2)	17 – Tillman	10 – Tillman	6 – Yánez	Wellness and Events Center (334); Newark, NJ
January 24, 2026; 1:00 p.m., ESPN+		at UMass Lowell	W 75–52	10–9 (5–2)	22 – H. Williams	9 – Tillman	6 – Yánez	Kennedy Family Athletic Complex (262); Lowell, MA
January 29, 2026; 6:30 p.m., ESPN+		Vermont	L 47–69	10–10 (5–3)	10 – Tillman	8 – Tillman	3 – Yánez	Chesapeake Employers Insurance Arena (542); Baltimore, MD
January 31, 2026; 2:00 p.m., ESPN+		Albany	W 55–46 ^{OT}	11–10 (6–3)	14 – Tied	10 – H. Williams	4 – Tillman	Chesapeake Employers Insurance Arena (324); Baltimore, MD
February 5, 2026; 2:00 p.m., ESPN+		at Binghamton	L 59–73	11–11 (6–4)	19 – Tillman	8 – Tillman	3 – Yánez	Dr. Bai Lee Court (1,402); Vestal, NY
February 12, 2026; 6:30 p.m., ESPN+		Maine	L 55–56	11–12 (6–5)	12 – Tied	13 – Tillman	2 – Yánez	Chesapeake Employers Insurance Arena (1,540); Baltimore, MD
February 14, 2026; 1:00 p.m., ESPN+		New Hampshire	W 61–44	12–12 (7–5)	21 – Yarborough	7 – H. Williams	6 – Yánez	Chesapeake Employers Insurance Arena (663); Baltimore, MD
February 19, 2026; 6:00 p.m., ESPN+		at Vermont	W 46–44	13–12 (8–5)	19 – Tillman	10 – Tillman	4 – Yánez	Patrick Gymnasium (862); Burlington, VT
February 21, 2026; 4:00 p.m., ESPN+		at Albany	L 63–69 ^{2OT}	13–13 (8–6)	13 – Yánez	10 – H. Williams	3 – Yánez	Broadview Center (1,306); Albany, NY
February 26, 2026; 4:30 p.m., ESPN+		at Bryant	W 65–59 ^{2OT}	14–13 (9–6)	18 – Tillman	7 – Tillman	7 – Yanez	Chace Athletic Center (525); Smithfield, RI
February 28, 2026; 2:00 p.m., ESPN+		UMass Lowell	W 66–43	15–13 (10–6)	19 – H. Williams	12 – Tillman	4 – H. Williams	Chesapeake Employers Insurance Arena (898); Baltimore, MD
America East tournament
March 5, 2026; 6:30 p.m., ESPN+	(4)	(5) NJIT; Quarterfinals	W 66–65	16–13	21 – Tillman	12 – Tillman	6 – Yánez	Chesapeake Employers Insurance Arena (1,029); Baltimore, MD
March 9, 2026; 6:00 p.m., ESPN+	(4)	at (1) Vermont; Semifinals	L 65–68 ^{2OT}	16–14	32 – Tillman	10 – Tillman	3 – Yánez	Patrick Gymnasium (1,148); Burlington, VT
WNIT
March 19, 2026*; 7:00 p.m., ESPN+		at Ohio; First Round	W 62–58 ^{OT}	17–14	13 – Tillman	11 – Yarborough	3 – Yánez	Convocation Center (551); Athens, OH
March 23, 2026*; 6:00 p.m., ESPN+		at Marshall; Second Round	L 53–66	17–15	16 – Tillman	6 – Austin	6 – Yánez	Cam Henderson Center (1,416); Huntington, WV
*Non-conference game. ^{#}Rankings from AP Poll. (#) Tournament seedings in parentheses. All times are in Eastern Time.

== See also ==
- 2025–26 UMBC Retrievers men's basketball team
