= 2025–26 Vermont Catamounts women's basketball team =

American college basketball season

2025–26 Vermont Catamounts women's basketball

America East regular season and tournament champions

NCAA tournament, First Round
- Conference: America East Conference
- Record: 27–8 (13–3 AmEast)
- Head coach: Alisa Kresge (7th season)
- Associate head coach: Will Lanier; Sacha Santimano
- Assistant coaches: Hayley Moore; Alec Kerdell
- Home arena: Patrick Gym

2025–26 America East Conference women's basketball standings
	Conf.				Overall
Team	W		L	PCT	W		L	PCT
Vermont †	13	–	3	.813	27	–	8	.771
Maine	12	–	4	.750	19	–	13	.594
Binghamton	10	–	6	.625	20	–	13	.606
UMBC	10	–	6	.625	17	–	15	.531
NJIT	9	–	7	.563	19	–	13	.594
Bryant	8	–	8	.500	18	–	12	.600
New Hampshire	4	–	12	.250	10	–	20	.333
Albany	4	–	12	.250	14	–	16	.467
UMass Lowell	2	–	14	.125	8	–	21	.276
† 2026 AmEast tournament winner

The 2025–26 Vermont Catamounts women's basketball team represented the University of Vermont during the 2025–26 NCAA Division I women's basketball season. The Catamounts, led by seventh-year head coach Alisa Kresge, played their home games at the Patrick Gym in Burlington, Vermont as members of the America East Conference.

== Previous season ==
The Catamounts finished the 2024–25 season 21–13, 13–3 in America East play, to finish in second place. They defeated UMBC, Bryant, and Albany to win the AmEast tournament championship, earning the conference's automatic bid to the NCAA tournament. In the NCAA tournament, they received the No. 15 seed in the Spokane Regional 1, where they were defeated by No. 2 seed NC State in the First Round.

== Offseason ==
=== Departures ===
Vermont departures
Name	Num	Pos.	Height	Year	Hometown	Reason for departure
Lexi Kerstein	1	G	5'6"	Sophomore	Riverwoods, IL	Transferred to Northern Illinois
Natalie Beaudoin	4	G	6'0"	Freshman	Lewiston, ME	Transferred to Franklin Pierce (DII)
Bella Vito	10	G	5'9"	Senior	Montville, NJ	Graduated
Nika Kurdija	11	G	5'9"	Junior	Gornja Vrba, Croatia	Transferred to USC Aiken (DII)
Sarah Erickson	22	G	5'7"	Senior	Norwich, CT	Graduated
Anna Olson	24	F	6'1"	Graduate	Monticello, MN	Graduated
Sarah Lazar	34	F	6'3"	Senior	Madison, WI	Graduated

=== Incoming transfers ===
Vermont incoming transfers
Name	Num	Pos.	Height	Year	Hometown	Previous school
Annemarie Batista	11	F	6'1"	RS senior	Tucson, AZ	Little Rock
Jadyn Weltz	24	G	5'7"	RS senior	Timmins, Ontario	Binghamton

=== Recruiting class ===
There was no recruiting class for 2025.

== Preseason ==
On October 20, 2025, the America East Conference released their preseason poll. Vermont was picked to finish atop the conference, receiving seven first-place votes.

=== Preseason rankings ===
AmEast Preseason Poll
Place	Team	Votes
1	Vermont	63 (7)
2	Maine	55 (2)
3	Bryant	46
4	Albany	42
5	NJIT	37
6	Binghamton	26
7	New Hampshire	24
8	UMBC	23
9	UMass Lowell	8
(#) first-place votes

=== Preseason All-America East Team ===
Preseason All-America East Team
Player	Year	Position
Catherine Gilwee	(redshirt) Senior	Guard
Nikola Priede	Senior	Center

== Roster ==
2025–26 Vermont Catamounts women's basketball team
Players
Coaches

Pos.	#	Name	Height	Year	Previous school	Hometown
G	0	Malia Lenz	5 ft 10 in (1.78 m)	Jr	Abbotsford Senior Secondary School	Chilliwack, British Columbia
G	1	Jacklynn Hosier	5 ft 8 in (1.73 m)	Fr	Alexandria High School	Alexandria, IN
G	2	Maren Maxon	5 ft 8 in (1.73 m)	Fr	Wells High School	Wells, ME
G	3	Emma Haan	5 ft 7 in (1.7 m)	So	Zionsville Community High School	Zionsville, IN
F	4	Madison Hall	6 ft 1 in (1.85 m)	Fr	Good Counsel High School	Crofton, MD
G	10	Lia Hanson	5 ft 10 in (1.78 m)	Fr	Issaquah High School	Bellevue, WA
F	11	Annemarie Batista	6 ft 1 in (1.85 m)	RS Sr	Little Rock	Tucson, AZ
G	12	Keira Hanson	5 ft 8 in (1.73 m)	Sr	Issaquah High School	Issaquah, WA
G	14	Catherine Gilwee	5 ft 8 in (1.73 m)	RS Sr	Champlain Valley Union High School	Shelburne, VT
F	15	Piper Risdon	6 ft 0 in (1.83 m)	So	Lowell High School	Lowell, MI
G	23	Devon Yarde	5 ft 6 in (1.68 m)	So	Hilton Head Christian Academy	Bluffton, SC
G	24	Jadyn Weltz	5 ft 7 in (1.7 m)	RS Sr	O'Gorman High School; Binghamton	Timmins, Ontario
C	25	Nikola Priede	6 ft 2 in (1.88 m)	Sr	Riga High School	Riga, Latvia
F	33	Savanna Creal	6 ft 0 in (1.83 m)	RS Fr	Hamilton Chandler High School	Chandler, AZ

Head coach

- Alisa Kresge (Marist)

Assistant coach(es)

- Will Lanier (Georgia Tech)
- Sacha Santimano (Dakota State)
- Hayley Moore (Binghamton)
- Alec Kerdell (Alabama)

Legend

- (C) Team captain
- (S) Suspended
- (I) Ineligible
- (W) Walk-on
- Injured
- Current redshirt

Roster
Last update: December 23, 2025

== Schedule and results ==
Date time, TV	Rank^{#}	Opponent^{#}	Result	Record	High points	High rebounds	High assists	Site (attendance) city, state
Exhibition
October 30, 2025*; 6:00 p.m.		Saint Michael's	W 68–34		–	–	–	Patrick Gymnasium; Burlington, VT
Non-conference regular season
November 4, 2025*; 6:00 p.m., ESPN+		Dean College	W 137–31	1–0	20 – Priede	7 – Tied	6 – Tied	Patrick Gymnasium (586); Burlington, VT
November 8, 2025*; 12:00 p.m., ESPN+		Saint Anselm	W 84–49	2–0	23 – Priede	8 – Priede	3 – Tied	Patrick Gymnasium (774); Burlington, VT
November 12, 2025*; 4:00 p.m., ESPN+		Buffalo	W 73–55	3–0	20 – K. Hanson	11 – Priede	6 – Weltz	Patrick Gymnasium (629); Burlington, VT
November 15, 2025*; 1:00 p.m., ESPN+		at Lehigh	W 59–49	4–0	15 – Weltz	10 – Lenz	3 – Tied	Stabler Arena (418); Bethlehem, PA
November 19, 2025*; 7:00 p.m., ESPN+		at High Point	L 65–71	4–1	19 – Tied	11 – Priede	4 – Weltz	Qubein Center (675); High Point, NC
November 23, 2025*; 5:00 p.m., B1G+		at No. 25 Washington	L 39–71	4–2	12 – K. Hanson	8 – Priede	2 – Priede	Alaska Airlines Arena (1,667); Seattle, WA
November 28, 2025*; 7:30 p.m., ESPN+		vs. Hawaii; American Savings Bank Rainbow Wahine Showdown	W 73–67	5–2	18 – Priede	8 – Priede	3 – Priede	Stan Sheriff Center (1,680); Honolulu, HI
November 29, 2025*; 5:00 p.m., ESPN+		vs. Santa Clara; American Savings Bank Rainbow Wahine Showdown	W 63–51	6–2	19 – K. Hanson	12 – Priede	4 – Weltz	Stan Sheriff Center (100); Honolulu, HI
November 30, 2025*; 5:00 p.m., ESPN+		vs. Lindenwood; American Savings Bank Rainbow Wahine Showdown	L 54–58	6–3	16 – K. Hanson	7 – Priede	2 – Priede	Stan Sheriff Center; Honolulu, HI
December 5, 2025*; 6:00 p.m., ESPN+		Bucknell	W 64–48	7–3	17 – Weltz	11 – Lenz	4 – Weltz	Patrick Gymnasium (778); Burlington, VT
December 7, 2025*; 1:00 p.m., NEC Front Row		at Central Connecticut	W 85–48	8–3	13 – Tied	9 – Haan	5 – Priede	Detrick Gymnasium (204); New Britain, CT
December 14, 2025*; 2:00 p.m., ESPN+		at Sacred Heart	W 63–46	9–3	25 – Priede	10 – Priede	9 – Weltz	William H. Pitt Center (565); Fairfield, CT
December 16, 2025*; 10:30 a.m., ESPN+		at Holy Cross	L 45–46	9–4	11 – Priede	9 – Lenz	1 – Tied	Hart Center Arena (3,167); Worcester, MA
December 20, 2025*; 12:00 p.m., FloCollege		at Drexel	W 69–59	10–4	21 – Priede	9 – Priede	6 – Weltz	Daskalakis Athletic Center (340); Philadelphia, PA
December 28, 2025*; 2:00 p.m., NESN		Dartmouth	W 61–59	11–4	18 – Priede	9 – Priede	7 – Weltz	Patrick Gymnasium (1,072); Burlington, VT
America East regular season
January 1, 2026; 2:00 p.m., ESPN+		at Albany	W 72−56	12−4 (1−0)	19 – K. Hanson	6 – Tied	5 – Weltz	Broadview Center (1,243); Albany, NY
January 3, 2026; 2:00 p.m., ESPN+		New Hampshire	W 72–56	13–4 (2–0)	35 – Priede	7 – Lenz	11 – Weltz	Patrick Gymnasium (1,219); Burlington, VT
January 8, 2026; 6:07 p.m., ESPN+		at Binghamton	L 67–71	13–5 (2–1)	21 – Lenz	12 – Priede	5 – Weltz	Dr. Bai Lee Court (1,273); Vestal, NY
January 15, 2026; 6:00 p.m., ESPN+		at Maine	W 64–53	14–5 (3–1)	20 – K. Hanson	10 – Lenz	6 – Weltz	Memorial Gymnasium (934); Orono, ME
January 17, 2026; 6:00 p.m., ESPN+		Albany	W 60–49	15–5 (4–1)	15 – Weltz	9 – Tied	3 – Weltz	Patrick Gymnasium (966); Burlington, VT
January 22, 2026; 11:00 a.m., ESPN+		UMass Lowell	W 82–46	16–5 (5–1)	31 – Priede	6 – Tied	6 – Weltz	Patrick Gymnasium (2,171); Burlington, VT
January 24, 2026; 2:00 p.m., ESPN+		Bryant	W 71–53	17–5 (6–1)	21 – Weltz	9 – Tied	3 – Haan	Patrick Gymnasium (1,538); Burlington, VT
January 29, 2026; 6:30 p.m., ESPN+		at UMBC	W 69–47	18–5 (7–1)	21 – Priede	12 – Priede	4 – K. Hanson	Chesapeake Employers Insurance Arena (542); Baltimore, MD
January 31, 2026; 12:00 p.m., ESPN+		at NJIT	W 63–61	19–5 (8–1)	26 – Priede	10 – Priede	7 – Weltz	Wellness and Events Center (376); Newark, NJ
February 5, 2026; 11:00 a.m., NESN		Maine	L 46–55	19–6 (8–2)	13 – Tied	10 – Priede	3 – Haan	Patrick Gymnasium (2,549); Burlington, VT
February 7, 2026; 1:00 p.m., ESPN+		at New Hampshire	W 60–35	20–6 (9–2)	23 – Priede	12 – Lenz	2 – K. Hanson	Lundholm Gymnasium (337); Durham, NH
February 12, 2026; 6:00 p.m., ESPN+		Binghamton	W 61–52	21–6 (10–2)	21 – K. Hanson	7 – Lenz	4 – Weltz	Patrick Gymnasium (777); Burlington, VT
February 14, 2026; 2:00 p.m., ESPN+		at Bryant	W 52–45	22–6 (11–2)	15 – K. Hanson	10 – Priede	2 – Tied	Chace Athletic Center (179); Smithfield, RI
February 19, 2026; 6:00 p.m., ESPN+		UMBC	L 44–46	22–7 (11–3)	19 – Priede	6 – Priede	3 – Weltz	Patrick Gymnasium (862); Burlington, VT
February 21, 2026; 4:00 p.m., ESPN+		NJIT	W 67–37	23–7 (12–3)	25 – Priede	11 – Priede	8 – Weltz	Patrick Gymnasium (1,162); Burlington, VT
February 26, 2026; 6:00 p.m., ESPN+		at UMass Lowell	W 68–37	24–7 (13–3)	20 – Priede	9 – Lenz	5 – Priede	Kennedy Family Athletic Complex (232); Lowell, MA
America East tournament
March 5, 2026; 6:00 p.m., ESPN+	(1)	(8) Albany; Quarterfinals	W 55–40	25–7	16 – Priede	8 – Weltz	6 – K. Hanson	Patrick Gymnasium (932); Burlington, VT
March 9, 2026; 6:00 p.m., ESPN+	(1)	(4) UMBC; Semifinals	W 68–65 ^{2OT}	26–7	23 – Weltz	14 – Haan	3 – K. Hanson	Patrick Gymnasium (1,148); Burlington, VT
March 13, 2026; 5:00 p.m., ESPNU	(1)	(2) Maine; Championship	W 61–43	27–7	23 – K. Hanson	14 – Lenz	5 – Weltz	Patrick Gymnasium (2,247); Burlington, VT
NCAA tournament
March 21, 2026*; 12:00 p.m., ESPN	(14 FW3)	at (3 FW3) No. 13 Louisville; First Round	L 52–72	27–8	22 – K. Hanson	13 – Lenz	3 – Haan	KFC Yum! Center (5,895); Louisville, KY
*Non-conference game. ^{#}Rankings from AP Poll. (#) Tournament seedings in parentheses. FW3=Fort Worth 3. All times are in Eastern Time.
