= 2025–26 Boston College Eagles women's basketball team =

Intercollegiate basketball season

2025–26 Boston College Eagles women's basketball
- Conference: Atlantic Coast Conference
- Record: 5–26 (1–17 ACC)
- Head coach: Joanna Bernabei-McNamee (8th season)
- Assistant coaches: Sean Ehlbeck (3rd season); Clint Williams (1st season); John Marcum (1st season); Kristina Baugh (1st season)
- Home arena: Conte Forum

2025–26 ACC women's basketball standings
| | Conf. | | | | Overall |
| Team | W | | L | PCT | W | | L | PCT |
|---|---|---|---|---|---|---|---|---|
| No. 5 Duke † | 16 | – | 2 | .889 | 27 | – | 9 | .750 |
| No. 11 Louisville | 15 | – | 3 | .833 | 29 | – | 8 | .784 |
| No. 13 North Carolina | 14 | – | 4 | .778 | 28 | – | 8 | .778 |
| NC State | 13 | – | 5 | .722 | 21 | – | 11 | .656 |
| No. 9 Notre Dame | 12 | – | 6 | .667 | 25 | – | 10 | .714 |
| Virginia Tech | 12 | – | 6 | .667 | 23 | – | 10 | .697 |
| Syracuse | 12 | – | 6 | .667 | 24 | – | 9 | .727 |
| No. 19 Virginia | 11 | – | 7 | .611 | 22 | – | 12 | .647 |
| Clemson | 11 | – | 7 | .611 | 21 | – | 12 | .636 |
| California | 9 | – | 9 | .500 | 21 | – | 15 | .583 |
| Georgia Tech | 8 | – | 10 | .444 | 14 | – | 19 | .424 |
| Miami (FL) | 8 | – | 10 | .444 | 18 | – | 15 | .545 |
| Stanford | 8 | – | 10 | .444 | 21 | – | 14 | .600 |
| Florida State | 5 | – | 13 | .278 | 10 | – | 21 | .323 |
| Wake Forest | 4 | – | 14 | .222 | 14 | – | 18 | .438 |
| SMU | 2 | – | 16 | .111 | 9 | – | 21 | .300 |
| Pittsburgh | 1 | – | 17 | .056 | 8 | – | 23 | .258 |
| Boston College | 1 | – | 17 | .056 | 5 | – | 26 | .161 |
† 2026 ACC tournament winner Rankings from AP Poll

The 2025–26 Boston College Eagles women's basketball team represented Boston College during the 2025–26 NCAA Division I women's basketball season. The Eagles were led by eighth-year head coach Joanna Bernabei-McNamee. They played their home games at the Conte Forum in Chestnut Hill, Massachusetts as members of the Atlantic Coast Conference.

Boston College began their season with a one-point loss against Holy Cross, but turned it around with three straight wins. They then lost three straight games, including one in overtime to Harvard. They broke the streak with a 77–72 victory over Merrimack. The Eagles then traveled to Daytona Beach, Florida to participate in the Daytona Beach Classic. There they lost both of their games. After the November 25 victory over Merrimack, the Eagles would not win another game until February 19. This included fifteen-straight ACC losses and twenty straight overall losses. They played only two ranked teams during the run, eigtht-ranked Louisville and sixteenth-ranked North Carolina. The closest games in the stretch were a three-point loss to Pittsburgh and a five-point loss to Murray State. The streak was broken with a 77–59 win over SMU on February 19. The Eagles lost their final two ACC games to end the season.

The Eagles finished the season 5–26 overall and 1–17 in ACC play to finish in a tie for seventeenth place. They did not qualify for the ACC tournament and were not invited to the NCAA or WBIT. After the season, on March 1, Boston College fired head coach Joanna Bernabei-McNamee.

== Previous season ==
The Eagles finished the season 16–18 overall and 6–12 in ACC play to finish in a tie for twelfth place. As the twelfth seed in the ACC tournament, they faced thirteenth seed Syracuse for a third time this season. The regular season series finished 1–1 but the Eagles triumphed 76–73 in the tournament to advance to the Second Round. They lost 78–71 in the Second Round to fifth seed and fourteenth ranked North Carolina. They received an at-large bid to the WBIT and were an unranked team in the St. Joseph's section of the bracket. They lost to fourth seed Villanova 76–70 in the First Round to end their season.

== Off-season ==
=== Departures ===
Departures
| Name | Number | Pos. | Height | Year | Hometown | Reason for Departure |
|---|---|---|---|---|---|---|
| JaKayla Thompson | 1 | G | 5'8" | Sophomore | Louisville, Kentucky | Transferred to Liberty |
| Kaylah Ivey | 2 | G | 5'8" | (redshirt) Senior | Forestville, Maryland | Graduated |
| Nene Ndiaye | 10 | F | 6'1" | Sophomore | Saly, Senegal | Transferred to Rutgers |
| Déborah Mukeba | 12 | C | 6'5" | Freshman | Fleurus, Belgium | Transferred to Georgia Tech |
| Tatum Greene | 13 | G | 6'3" | Freshman | Baltimore, Maryland | Transferred to Florida State |
| Kayla Lezama | 14 | G | 5'11" | Junior | Boston, Massachusetts | Transferred to Hampton |
| Lili Krasovec | 16 | F | 6'3" | Sophomore | Budapest, Hungary | Transferred to Purdue Fort Wayne |
| Andrea Daley | 21 | G | 6'0" | Senior | Miami, Florida | Graduated |
| Kennedi Jackson | 23 | F | 6'4" | (redshirt) Senior | New Orleans, Louisiana | Graduated |
| Dontavia Waggoner | 24 | G | 6'0" | Graduate Student | Nashville, Tennessee | Graduated |
| T'yana Todd | 30 | G | 6'0" | Junior | Vaughan, Canada | Transferred to Ohio State |
| Teya Sidberry | 32 | F | 6'1" | Junior | Salt Lake City, Utah | Transferred to Texas |
| Savannah Samuel | 33 | G | 6'1" | Senior | Woodstock, Georgia | Graduated; transferred to Georgia Tech |

=== Incoming transfers ===
Incoming Transfers
| Name | Number | Pos. | Height | Year | Hometown | Previous School |
|---|---|---|---|---|---|---|
| Erin Houpt | 1 | G | 5'6" | (redshirt) Senior | Danville, Illinois | San Diego State |
| Teionni McDaniel | 2 | G | 5'9" | Graduate Student | Las Vegas, Nevada | Georgetown College |
| Lily Carmody | 8 | G | 5'11" | Sophomore | Melbourne, Australia | Butler |
| Kaia Henderson | 11 | G | 5'6" | (redshirt) Junior | Utica, New York | Ohio State |
| Emma LoPinto | 12 | G | 5'4" | Graduate Student | Manhasset, New York | Boston College lacrosse |
| Kiera Edmonds | 24 | F | 6'2" | (redshirt) Sophomore | Brooklyn, New York | Houston |

=== Recruiting class ===
College recruiting information
| Name | Hometown | School | Height | Weight | Commit date |
|---|---|---|---|---|---|
| Amirah Anderson; G | Stafford, Virginia | Bishop Ireton High School | 5 ft 11 in (1.80 m) | N/A | Nov 13, 2024 |
| Amirah Anderson; G | Recruit ratings: ESPN: (92) | | | | |
| Jocelyne Grier; G | Charlotte, North Carolina | Winston-Salem Christian | 5 ft 8 in (1.73 m) | N/A | Nov 13, 2024 |
| Jocelyne Grier; G | Recruit ratings: ESPN: | | | | |
| Kennedy Hall; F | Indian Head, Maryland | Westtown School | 6 ft 3 in (1.91 m) | N/A | Nov 13, 2024 |
| Kennedy Hall; F | Recruit ratings: ESPN: | | | | |
| Eleanor Trout; F | Melbourne, Australia | Templestowe College | 6 ft 3 in (1.91 m) | N/A | Nov 13, 2024 |
| Eleanor Trout; F | Recruit ratings: ESPN: | | | | |
Overall recruit ranking:
Note: In many cases, Scout, Rivals, 247Sports, On3, and ESPN may conflict in their listings of height and weight.; In these cases, the average was taken. ESPN grades are on a 100-point scale.; Sources:

== Roster ==
2025–26 Boston College Eagles women's basketball team
Players
Coaches

| Pos. | # | Name | Height | Year | Previous school | Hometown |
|---|---|---|---|---|---|---|
| G | 0 | Athena Tomlinson | 5 ft 5 in (1.65 m) | So | Clovis West | Fresno, CA |
| G | 1 | Erin Houpt | 5 ft 6 in (1.68 m) | RS Sr | Daville; San Diego State | Danville, IL |
| G | 2 | Teionni McDaniel | 5 ft 9 in (1.75 m) | GS | Centennial; Georgetown College | Las Vegas, NV |
| G | 3 | Ava McGee | 5 ft 10 in (1.78 m) | Jr | Maret | Washington, D.C. |
| G | 4 | Jocelyne Grier | 5 ft 8 in (1.73 m) | Fr | Winston-Salem Christian | Charlotte, NC |
| G | 8 | Lily Carmody | 5 ft 11 in (1.8 m) | So | Melbourne Tigers; Butler | Melbourne, Australia |
| G | 11 | Kaia Henderson | 5 ft 6 in (1.68 m) | RS Jr | New Hartford; Ohio State | Utica, NY |
| G | 12 | Emma Lopinto | 5 ft 4 in (1.63 m) | GS | Manhasset; Boston College lacrosse | Manhasset, NY |
| G | 21 | Amirah Anderson | 5 ft 11 in (1.8 m) | Fr | Bishop Ireton | Stafford, VA |
| F | 23 | Kayla Rolph | 6 ft 2 in (1.88 m) | Sr | Potomac School; William & Mary | Great Falls, VA |
| F | 24 | Kiera Edmonds | 6 ft 2 in (1.88 m) | RS So | Brooklyn & Law Tech; Houston | Brooklyn, NY |
| F | 31 | Kennedy Hall | 6 ft 3 in (1.91 m) | Fr | Westtown School | Indian Head, MD |
| F | 33 | Eleanor Trout | 6 ft 3 in (1.91 m) | Fr | Templestowe College | Melbourne, Australia |

Head coach

- Joanna Bernabei-McNamee (West Liberty)

Assistant coach(es)

- Sean Ehlbeck (Maryland)
- Clint Williams (Tuskegee)
- John Marcum (Oklahoma Baptist)
- Kristina Baugh (Providence)

Legend

- (C) Team captain
- (S) Suspended
- (I) Ineligible
- (W) Walk-on
- Injured
- Current redshirt

Roster
Last update: September 17, 2025

== Schedule ==
| Date time, TV | Rank^{#} | Opponent^{#} | Result | Record | High points | High rebounds | High assists | Site (attendance) city, state |
Exhibition
| October 13, 2025*; 2:00 p.m., NBCSB | | UConn | L 67–84 | — | 23 – McDaniel | 6 – Tied | 5 – Tomlinson | Mohegan Sun Arena (6,012); Uncasville, CT |
Regular season
| November 3, 2025*; 6:00 p.m., ACCNX | | Holy Cross | L 71–72 | 0–1 | 15 – Rolph | 9 – Anderson | 6 – Tomlinson | Conte Forum (826); Chestnut Hill, MA |
| November 6, 2025*; 5:00 p.m., ACCNX | | New Hampshire | W 69–57 | 1–1 | 21 – Carmody | 8 – Rolph | 7 – Tomlinson | Conte Forum (631); Chestnut Hill, MA |
| November 9, 2025*; 12:00 p.m., ACCNX | | UMass Lowell | W 82–53 | 2–1 | 15 – McDaniel | 6 – Tied | 7 – Tomlinson | Conte Forum (713); Chestnut Hill, MA |
| November 12, 2025*; 6:00 p.m., ACCNX | | Rider | W 92–52 | 3–1 | 21 – McDaniel | 8 – McGee | 10 – Tomlinson | Conte Forum (591); Chestnut Hill, MA |
| November 15, 2025*; 1:00 p.m., ESPN+ | | at Providence | L 61–70 | 3–2 | 18 – Carmody | 8 – Anderson | 10 – Tomlinson | Alumni Hall (714); Providence, RI |
| November 19, 2025*; 6:00 p.m., ACCNX | | Harvard | L 65–72 ^{OT} | 3–3 | 22 – Carmody | 8 – McGee | 7 – Tomlinson | Conte Forum (817); Chestnut Hill, MA |
| November 22, 2025*; 1:00 p.m., ESPN+ | | at UMass | L 52–61 | 3–4 | 9 – Tied | 9 – Rolph | 4 – Tomlinson | Mullins Center (1,161); Amherst, MA |
| November 25, 2025*; 11:00 a.m., ACCNX | | Merrimack | W 77–72 | 4–4 | 21 – Tomlinson | 12 – Rolph | 6 – Tomlinson | Conte Forum (5,167); Chestnut Hill, MA |
| November 28, 2025*; 11:00 a.m., BallerTV | | vs. James Madison; Daytona Beach Classic | L 53–73 | 4–5 | 14 – Grier | 5 – Tied | 5 – Carmody | Ocean Center (110); Daytona Beach, FL |
| November 29, 2025*; 11:00 a.m., BallerTV | | vs. Murray State; Daytona Beach Classic | L 77–82 | 4–6 | 18 – McDaniel | 8 – McGee | 5 – Tomlinson | Ocean Center (120); Daytona Beach, FL |
| December 3, 2025*; 3:00 p.m., ACCNX | | Quinnipiac | L 49–76 | 4–7 | 14 – Anderson | 8 – Rolph | 4 – Henderson | Conte Forum (617); Chestnut Hill, MA |
| December 7, 2025; 12:00 p.m., ACCNX | | Virginia | L 55–81 | 4–8 (0–1) | 15 – Tomlinson | 6 – Anderson | 3 – Carmody | Conte Forum (836); Chestnut Hill, MA |
| December 9, 2025*; 6:00 p.m., ACCNX | | Bryant | L 71–80 | 4–9 | 15 – Carmody | 7 – Rolph | 8 – Tomlinson | Conte Forum (488); Chestnut Hill, MA |
| December 19, 2025*; 12:00 p.m., ACCNX | | Northeastern | L 67–73 | 4–10 | 15 – Anderson | 6 – Tied | 7 – McDaniel | Conte Forum (626); Chestnut Hill, MA |
| December 29, 2025; 8:00 p.m., ACCN | | No. 16 North Carolina | L 39–90 | 4–11 (0–2) | 10 – Henderson | 5 – Tied | 3 – Tomlinson | Conte Forum (1,213); Chestnut Hill, MA |
| January 1, 2026; 1:00 p.m., ACCNX | | at Duke | L 49–100 | 4–12 (0–3) | 13 – Grier | 3 – Tied | 3 – Tied | Cameron Indoor Stadium (2,882); Durham, NC |
| January 4, 2026; 6:00 p.m., ACCN | | Pittsburgh | L 61–64 | 4–13 (0–4) | 12 – Carmody | 9 – Rolph | 5 – Tomlinson | Conte Forum (623); Chestnut Hill, MA |
| January 8, 2026; 6:00 p.m., ACCNX | | at Notre Dame | L 60–94 | 4–14 (0–5) | 18 – Grier | 6 – Anderson | 5 – Tomlinson | Purcell Pavilion (6,223); Notre Dame, IN |
| January 11, 2026; 12:00 p.m., ACCN | | at Virginia Tech | L 56–78 | 4–15 (0–6) | 14 – Anderson | 5 – Tied | 2 – Tied | Cassell Coliseum (4,144); Blacksburg, VA |
| January 15, 2026; 6:00 p.m., ACCNX | | Stanford | L 52–77 | 4–16 (0–7) | 15 – Rolph | 5 – Tomlinson | 5 – Tomlinson | Conte Forum (633); Chestnut Hill, MA |
| January 18, 2026; 12:00 p.m., ACCNX | | California | L 58–73 | 4–17 (0–8) | 17 – Carmody | 7 – Carmody | 3 – Anderson | Conte Forum (867); Chestnut Hill, MA |
| January 24, 2026; 11:00 a.m., ACCNX | | at No. 8 Louisville | L 56–85 | 4–18 (0–9) | 16 – Anderson | 7 – Edmonds | 3 – Tomlinson | KFC Yum! Center (7,750); Louisville, KY |
| January 29, 2026; 6:00 p.m., ACCN | | NC State | L 84–106 | 4–19 (0–10) | 23 – Grier | 7 – Tied | 5 – Tied | Conte Forum (623); Chestnut Hill, MA |
| February 1, 2026; 2:00 p.m., ACCN | | at Georgia Tech | L 60–70 | 4–20 (0–11) | 20 – Grier | 9 – Rolph | 3 – Tied | McCamish Pavilion (2,051); Atlanta, GA |
| February 5, 2026; 6:00 p.m., ACCNX | | Syracuse | L 59–93 | 4–21 (0–12) | 15 – Tied | 3 – Tied | 4 – Henderson | Conte Forum (623); Chestnut Hill, MA |
| February 8, 2026; 2:00 p.m., ACCNX | | at Clemson | L 59–83 | 4–22 (0–13) | 14 – Houpt | 7 – Rolph | 4 – Carmody | Littlejohn Coliseum (1,160); Clemson, SC |
| February 12, 2026; 6:00 p.m., ACCNX | | at Florida State | L 76–85 | 4–23 (0–14) | 18 – Tied | 5 – Tomlinson | 4 – Tomlinson | Donald L. Tucker Center (1,050); Tallahassee, FL |
| February 15, 2026; 12:00 p.m., ACCNX | | Miami (FL) | L 70–82 | 4–24 (0–15) | 21 – Carmody | 5 – Tied | 3 – Tied | Conte Forum (1,527); Chestnut Hill, MA |
| February 19, 2026; 6:30 p.m., ACCNX | | at SMU | W 77–59 | 5–24 (1–15) | 27 – Carmody | 8 – Rolph | 5 – Tomlinson | Moody Coliseum (1,289); University Park, TX |
| February 22, 2026; 12:00 p.m., ACCNX | | Wake Forest | L 65–79 | 5–25 (1–16) | 14 – Carmody | 8 – Rolph | 4 – Tomlinson | Conte Forum (1,113); Chestnut Hill, MA |
| March 1, 2026; 2:00 p.m., ACCNX | | at Syracuse | L 65–90 | 5–26 (1–17) | 20 – Grier | 7 – Anderson | 3 – Tied | JMA Wireless Dome (4,058); Syracuse, NY |
*Non-conference game. ^{#}Rankings from AP Poll. (#) Tournament seedings in parentheses. All times are in Eastern.
