= 2025–26 Binghamton Bearcats women's basketball team =

American college basketball season

2025–26 Binghamton Bearcats women's basketball
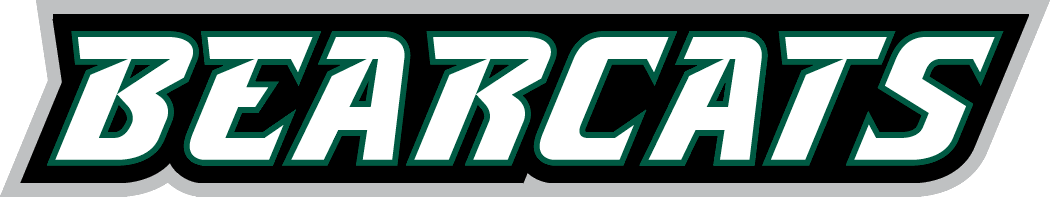

WNIT, Second Round
- Conference: America East Conference
- Record: 20–13 (10–6 AmEast)
- Head coach: Mary Grimes (2nd season)
- Assistant coaches: Zakiya Saunders; Jason Marshall; Evelyn Thompson
- Home arena: Binghamton University Events Center

2025–26 America East Conference women's basketball standings
	Conf.				Overall
Team	W		L	PCT	W		L	PCT
Vermont †	13	–	3	.813	27	–	8	.771
Maine	12	–	4	.750	19	–	13	.594
Binghamton	10	–	6	.625	20	–	13	.606
UMBC	10	–	6	.625	17	–	15	.531
NJIT	9	–	7	.563	19	–	13	.594
Bryant	8	–	8	.500	18	–	12	.600
New Hampshire	4	–	12	.250	10	–	20	.333
Albany	4	–	12	.250	14	–	16	.467
UMass Lowell	2	–	14	.125	8	–	21	.276
† 2026 AmEast tournament winner

The 2025–26 Binghamton Bearcats women's basketball team represented Binghamton University during the 2025–26 NCAA Division I women's basketball season. The Bearcats, led by second-year head coach Mary Grimes, played their home games at the Binghamton University Events Center in Vestal, New York as members of the America East Conference.

== Previous season ==
The Bearcats finished the 2024–25 season 15–15, 7–9 in AmEast play, to finish in fifth place. They were defeated by Bryant in the quarterfinals of the AmEast tournament.

== Offseason ==
=== Departures ===
Binghamton Departures
Name	Num	Pos.	Height	Year	Hometown	Reason for Departure
Kaylee Krysztof	2	G	5'9"	Sophomore	Buffalo, NY	Transferred to St. Bonaventure
Camryn Fauria	10	G/F	6'0"	Junior	Foxborough, MA	Transferred to New Hampshire
Samantha Baker	11	G	6'0"	Freshman	Nazareth, PA	Transferred to Edinboro (DII)
Jadyn Weltz	24	G	5'7"	RS Junior	Timmins, Ontario	Transferred to Vermont
Marisa Smith	34	F	6'3"	Freshman	Johnson City, NY	Transferred to Bucknell

=== Incoming transfers ===
Binghamton incoming transfers
Name	Num	Pos.	Height	Year	Hometown	Previous School
Kameryn Dorsey	2	G	5'6"	Junior	Baltimore, MD	Saint Francis

== Preseason ==
On October 20, 2025, the America East Conference released its preseason poll. Binghamton was picked to finish sixth in the conference.

=== Preseason rankings ===
AmEast Preseason Poll
Place	Team	Votes
1	Vermont	63 (7)
2	Maine	55 (2)
3	Bryant	46
4	Albany	42
5	NJIT	37
6	Binghamton	26
7	New Hampshire	24
8	UMBC	23
9	UMass Lowell	8
(#) first-place votes

=== Preseason All-America East Team ===
No players were named to the Preseason All-America East Team.

== Roster ==
2025–26 Binghamton Bearcats women's basketball team
Players
Coaches

Pos.	#	Name	Height	Year	Previous school	Hometown
G	0	Yanniah Boyd	5 ft 11 in (1.8 m)	Jr	Riverdale Baptist School	Frederick, Maryland
G	1	Klarissa Goode	5 ft 5 in (1.65 m)	Fr	Bishop Kearney High School	Rochester, New York
G	2	Kameryn Dorsey	5 ft 6 in (1.68 m)	Jr	Saint Francis (PA)	Baltimore, Maryland
G	3	Kaia Goode	5 ft 4 in (1.63 m)	Sr	Le Moyne	Rochester, New York
F	4	Kendall Bennett	6 ft 2 in (1.88 m)	Jr	Germantown Academy	Philadelphia, Pennsylvania
G	5	Meghan Casey	5 ft 9 in (1.75 m)	Sr	The Ursuline School	White Plains, New York
G	11	Carletta Bennett	5 ft 8 in (1.73 m)	Fr	King's Christian Collegiate	Brampton, Ontario
G	20	Bella Pucci	5 ft 9 in (1.75 m)	Jr	Fairport High School	Rochester, New York
F	21	Kaitlyn McMillan	6 ft 1 in (1.85 m)	Fr	Lo-Ellen Park Secondary School	Waterloo, Ontario
G	22	Leah Middleton	5 ft 11 in (1.8 m)	Jr	Le Moyne	Auburn, New York
G	23	Ashley Redd	5 ft 10 in (1.78 m)	Fr	Sierra Canyon School	Porter Ranch, California
C	32	Abby Misier	6 ft 5 in (1.96 m)	So	Hightstown High School	Hightstown, New Jersey
G	33	Leah Fowler	6 ft 0 in (1.83 m)	Fr	Barker College	Sydney, Australia
F	55	Daysha Salgado	6 ft 2 in (1.88 m)	Fr	James Monroe High School	Stafford, Virginia

Head coach

- Mary Grimes (Siena)

Assistant coach(es)

- Zakiya Saunders (Central Florida)
- Jason Marshall (Ramapo)
- Evelyn Thompson (Auburn)

Legend

- (C) Team captain
- (S) Suspended
- (I) Ineligible
- (W) Walk-on
- Injured
- Current redshirt

Roster
Last update: December 25, 2025

== Schedule and results ==
Date time, TV	Rank^{#}	Opponent^{#}	Result	Record	High points	High rebounds	High assists	Site (attendance) city, state
Non-conference regular season
November 3, 2025*; 5:00 pm, ESPN+		SUNY Geneseo	W 86–35	1–0	16 – K. Bennett	7 – K. Bennett	5 – Goode	Events Center (953); Vestal, NY
November 6, 2025*; 7:00 pm, ESPN+		Bloomsburg	W 92–44	2–0	14 – Pucci	11 – K. Bennett	4 – Tied	Events Center (1,027); Vestal, NY
November 11, 2025*; 7:00 pm, SNY/ESPN+		St. Bonaventure	L 65–68	2–1	16 – Pucci	7 – K. Bennett	4 – Goode	Events Center (1,210); Vestal, NY
November 18, 2025*; 7:00 pm, BIG+		at No. 6 Michigan	L 50–120	2–2	19 – Pucci	6 – Casey	3 – Tied	Crisler Center (2,557); Ann Arbor, MI
November 20, 2025*; 6:00 pm, ESPN+		at Akron	W 95–94 ^{2OT}	3–2	29 – Pucci	14 – K. Bennett	3 – Tied	James A. Rhodes Arena (807); Akron, OH
November 24, 2025*; 7:00 pm, SNY/ESPN+		at Columbia	L 60–73	3–3	16 – K. Bennett	8 – Tied	5 – Casey	Levien Gymnasium (735); New York, NY
December 3, 2025*; 2:00 pm, ESPN+		at San Diego	W 63–55	4–3	12 – K. Bennett	5 – Redd	7 – C. Bennett	Jenny Craig Pavilion (1,027); San Diego, CA
December 6, 2025*; 2:00 pm, SNY/ESPN+		Buffalo	W 71–58	5–3	18 – Pucci	7 – K. Bennett	2 – Tied	Events Center (1,615); Vestal, NY
December 13, 2025*; 2:00 pm, ESPN+		Marist	W 69–58	6–3	14 – K. Bennett	10 – K. Bennett	5 – Pucci	Events Center (1,405); Vestal, NY
December 16, 2025*; 7:00 pm, ACCNX		at Syracuse	L 54–72	6–4	11 – Pucci	7 – Boyd	3 – Tied	JMA Wireless Dome (2,072); Syracuse, NY
December 20, 2025*; 2:00 pm, SNY/ESPN+		Colgate	W 82–54	7–4	14 – K. Bennett	12 – K. Bennett	4 – Casey	Events Center (1,368); Vestal, NY
December 29, 2025*; 2:00 pm, NECFR		at Fairleigh Dickinson; FDU Christmas Classic semifinals	W 62–51	8–4	21 – K. Bennett	15 – K. Bennett	2 – Tied	Bogota Savings Bank Center (107); Hackensack, NJ
December 30, 2025*; 1:00 p.m., NECFR		vs. Penn; FDU Christmas Classic championship	L 54–59	8–5	16 – Pucci	9 – K. Bennett	3 – Pucci	Bogota Savings Bank Center (109); Hackensack, NJ
America East regular season
January 3, 2026; 1:00 pm, ESPN+		at NJIT	W 75–71	9–5 (1–0)	23 – Tied	11 – K. Bennett	7 – Pucci	Wellness and Events Center (244); Newark, NJ
January 8, 2026; 6:07 pm, ESPN+		Vermont	W 71–67	10–5 (2–0)	20 – Pucci	10 – K. Bennett	2 – Tied	Events Center (1,273); Vestal, NY
January 10, 2026; 1:00 pm, ESPN+		at UMass Lowell	W 80–52	11–5 (3–0)	26 – K. Bennett	8 – K. Bennett	4 – Tied	Kennedy Family Athletic Complex (184); Lowell, MA
January 15, 2026; 11:00 am, ESPN+		Albany	W 63–61	12–5 (4–0)	17 – K. Bennett	11 – K. Bennett	3 – Tied	Events Center (4,671); Vestal, NY
January 17, 2026; 2:00 pm, ESPN+		at UMBC	L 58–64	12–6 (4–1)	13 – Pucci	10 – K. Bennett	1 – Tied	Chesapeake Employers Insurance Arena (975); Catonsville, MD
January 22, 2026; 6:07 pm, MSGSN		New Hampshire	W 50–42	13–6 (5–1)	20 – Pucci	14 – K. Bennett	3 – Tied	Events Center (1,337); Vestal, NY
January 24, 2026; 2:00 pm, ESPN+		Maine	W 62–57	14–6 (6–1)	14 – Tied	12 – K. Bennett	4 – Goode	Events Center (1,458); Vestal, NY
January 29, 2026; 6:00 pm, ESPN+		at Bryant	W 66–64 ^{OT}	15–6 (7–1)	24 – K. Bennett	7 – C. Bennett	2 – Tied	Chace Athletic Center (167); Smithfield, RI
February 5, 2026; 6:07 pm, ESPN+		UMBC	W 73–59	16–6 (8–1)	21 – Pucci	13 – K. Bennett	5 – Pucci	Events Center (1,402); Vestal, NY
February 7, 2026; 12:00 pm, SNY/ESPN+		NJIT	W 72–67	17–6 (9–1)	31 – Pucci	13 – K. Bennett	4 – Casey	Events Center (1,921); Vestal, NY
February 12, 2026; 6:00 pm, ESPN+		at Vermont	L 52–61	17–7 (9–2)	17 – Pucci	12 – K. Bennett	1 – Tied	Patrick Gym (777); Burlington, VT
February 14, 2026; 7:00 pm, ESPN+		at Albany	L 41–52	17–8 (9–3)	11 – Boyd	12 – K. Bennett	2 – K. Bennett	Broadview Center (1,312); Albany, NY
February 19, 2026; 6:07 pm, ESPN+		Bryant	L 60–63	17–9 (9–4)	15 – Tied	14 – K. Bennett	4 – Boyd	Events Center (1,146); Vestal, NY
February 21, 2026; 3:00 pm, ESPN+		UMass Lowell	W 69–44	18–9 (10–4)	16 – Pucci	15 – K. Bennett	3 – Tied	Events Center (1,583); Vestal, NY
February 26, 2026; 6:00 pm, ESPN+		at New Hampshire	L 48–67	18–10 (10–5)	12 – Pucci	8 – K. Bennett	2 – C. Bennett	Lundholm Gym (264); Durham, NH
February 28, 2026; 1:00 pm, ESPN+		at Maine	L 67–74	18–11 (10–6)	24 – Pucci	10 – K. Bennett	6 – Casey	Memorial Gymnasium (1,172); Orono, ME
America East tournament
March 5, 2026; 6:07 p.m., ESPN+	(3)	(6) Bryant; Quarterfinals	W 45–44	19–11	9 – Tied	8 – K. Bennett	4 – Pucci	Events Center (2,030); Vestal, NY
March 9, 2026; 6:00 p.m., ESPN+	(3)	at (2) Maine; Semifinals	L 56–60	19–12	24 – Pucci	8 – K. Bennett	5 – Tied	Memorial Gymnasium (1,307); Orono, ME
WNIT
March 19, 2026; 6:00 p.m., ESPN+		at Mercyhurst; Round 1	W 81–60	20–12	23 – K. Bennett	16 – K. Bennett	7 – Casey	Owen McCormick Court (433); Erie, PA
March 23, 2026; 6:00 p.m., ESPN+		at La Salle; Round 2	L 61–70	20–13	12 – K. Bennett	11 – K. Bennett	4 – Casey	John Glaser Arena (1,069); Philadelphia, PA
*Non-conference game. ^{#}Rankings from AP Poll. (#) Tournament seedings in parentheses. All times are in Eastern.
