= 2026 America East women's basketball tournament =

American college basketball postseason tournament

- Classification: Division I
- Season: 2025–26
- Teams: 8
- Site: Campus sites
- Champions: Vermont (9th title)
- Winning coach: Alisa Kresge (3rd title)
- Television: ESPN+ ESPNU
- America East women's basketball tournaments

2025–26 America East Conference women's basketball standings
	Conf.				Overall
Team	W		L	PCT	W		L	PCT
Vermont †	13	–	3	.813	27	–	7	.794
Maine	12	–	4	.750	19	–	13	.594
Binghamton	10	–	6	.625	19	–	12	.613
UMBC	10	–	6	.625	16	–	14	.533
NJIT	9	–	7	.563	18	–	12	.600
Bryant	8	–	8	.500	18	–	12	.600
New Hampshire	4	–	12	.250	10	–	20	.333
Albany	4	–	12	.250	14	–	16	.467
UMass Lowell	2	–	14	.125	8	–	21	.276
† 2026 AmEast tournament winner As of March 13, 2026

The 2026 America East Women's Basketball Conference tournament was the 2026 postseason women's basketball tournament for the America East Conference. It was held March 5–13, 2026 at the campus sites of the higher seeds. The winner received the conference's automatic bid to the 2026 NCAA tournament. The tournament is sponsored by the United States Air Force Reserve and is officially known as the 2026 Air Force Reserve America East Women's Basketball Playoffs.

== Seeds ==
Eight of the nine America East teams qualified for the tournament. The teams are seeded by conference record, with a tiebreaker system to seed teams with identical conference records.

Seed	School	AmEast Record	Tiebreaker
1	Vermont	13–3	
2	Maine	12–4	
3	Binghamton	10–6	Better non-conference record
4	UMBC	10–6	
5	NJIT	9–7	
6	Bryant	8–8	
7	New Hampshire	4–12	2–0 against Albany
8	Albany	4–12	0–2 against New Hampshire
DNQ	UMass Lowell	2–14	

== Schedule ==
Game	Time*	Matchup^{#}	Score	Television
Quarterfinals – Thursday, March 5, 2026
1	6:00 p.m.	No. 8 Albany at No. 1 Vermont	40–55	ESPN+
2	6:00 p.m.	No. 7 New Hampshire at No. 2 Maine	58–77	ESPN+
3	6:07 p.m.	No. 6 Bryant at No. 3 Binghamton	44–45	ESPN+
4	6:30 p.m.	No. 5 NJIT at No. 4 UMBC	65–66	ESPN+
Semifinals – Monday, March 9, 2026
5	6:00 p.m.	No. 4 UMBC at No. 1 Vermont	65–68^{2OT}	ESPN+
6	6:00 p.m.	No. 3 Binghamton at No. 2 Maine	56–60	ESPN+
Championship – Friday, March 13, 2026
7	5:00 p.m.	No. 2 Maine at No. 1 Vermont	43–61	ESPNU
*Game times in EST for the quarter finals and EDT for the semifinals and championship. #-Rankings denote tournament seeding.

== Bracket ==
Quarterfinals; Thursday, March 5, 2026; ESPN+
1	Vermont	55
8	Albany	40
2	Maine	77
7	New Hampshire	58
(Pairings are reseeded after the first round)
3	Binghamton	45
6	Bryant	44
4	UMBC	66
5	NJIT	65

Semifinals; Monday, March 9, 2026; ESPN+
1	Vermont	68**
4	UMBC	65
2	Maine	60
3	Binghamton	56

Championship; Friday, March 13, 2026; ESPNU
1	Vermont	61
2	Maine	43

* denotes overtime period

== See also ==
- 2026 America East men's basketball tournament
