= 2025–26 New Hampshire Wildcats women's basketball team =

American college basketball season

2025–26 New Hampshire Wildcats women's basketball
- Conference: America East Conference
- Record: 10–20 (4–12 America East)
- Head coach: Megan Shoniker (2nd season)
- Assistant coaches: Kennedi Thompson; Jessica George; Alexa Brodie; Maxwell Fink
- Home arena: Lundholm Gym

2025–26 America East Conference women's basketball standings
	Conf.				Overall
Team	W		L	PCT	W		L	PCT
Vermont †	13	–	3	.813	27	–	8	.771
Maine	12	–	4	.750	19	–	13	.594
Binghamton	10	–	6	.625	20	–	13	.606
UMBC	10	–	6	.625	17	–	15	.531
NJIT	9	–	7	.563	19	–	13	.594
Bryant	8	–	8	.500	18	–	12	.600
New Hampshire	4	–	12	.250	10	–	20	.333
Albany	4	–	12	.250	14	–	16	.467
UMass Lowell	2	–	14	.125	8	–	21	.276
† 2026 AmEast tournament winner

The 2025–26 New Hampshire Wildcats women's basketball team represented the University of New Hampshire during the 2025–26 NCAA Division I women's basketball season. The Wildcats, led by second-year head coach Megan Shoniker, played their home games at the Lundholm Gymnasium in Durham, New Hampshire, as members of the America East Conference.

== Previous season ==
The Wildcats finished the season 10–20 and 4–12 in AmEast play to clinch the No. 8 seed in the America East tournament. They lost in the quarterfinals to No. 1 seed Albany.

== Offseason ==
=== Departures ===
New Hampshire departures
Name	Num	Pos.	Height	Year	Hometown	Reason for departure
McKenna Karlson	2	G	5'9"	Freshman	Manasquan, NJ	Transferred to Catholic (DIII)
Avery O'Connor	11	G	6'0"	Junior	Dedham, MA	Transferred to West Florida (DII)
Aina Roque Sucarrats	12	G	5'9"	Junior	Cervera, Spain	TBD; entered transfer portal
Clara Gomez	13	F	6'1"	Senior	Barcelona, Spain	Graduated
Sharmela Reid	14	F	6'1"	Sophomore	Montreal, Quebec	Transferred to Jacksonville
Carly Catania	15	G	5'9"	Freshman	West Chester, PA	Transferred to Catholic (DIII)
Karolina Andersson	20	G	5'11"	Junior	Söderköping, Sweden	Transferred to Bridgeport (DII)
Belen Morales Lopez	42	F	6'0"	Senior	Alicante, Spain	Graduated

=== Incoming transfers ===
New Hampshire incoming transfers
Name	Num	Pos.	Height	Year	Hometown	Previous school
Jamie Kent	1	F	6'0"	Junior	Dublin, CA	Pacific
Camryn Fauria	3	G/F	6'0"	Senior	North Attleborough, MA	Binghamton
Kassidy Thompson	12	G	5'10"	Junior	Mullica Hill, NJ	Hofstra
Katie Ledden	20	G/F	6'0"	Junior	Clark, NJ	Rhode Island
Sophia Sabino	22	G	5'9"	Senior	Rumson, NJ	Bucknell

=== Recruiting class ===
There was no recruiting class for the class of 2025.

== Roster ==
2025–26 New Hampshire Wildcats women's basketball team
Players
Coaches

Pos.	#	Name	Height	Year	Previous school	Hometown
G	0	Maggie Cavanaugh	5 ft 9 in (1.75 m)	Jr	St. Rose High School	Point Pleasant Beach, NJ
F	1	Jamie Kent	6 ft 0 in (1.83 m)	Jr	Carondelet High School; Pacific	Dublin, CA
G	2	Carolina Williams	5 ft 8 in (1.73 m)	Fr	Hoosac School	Valatie, NY
G/F	3	Camryn Fauria	6 ft 0 in (1.83 m)	Sr	Bishop Feehan High School; Binghamton	North Attleborough, MA
G	10	Diana Eliasson	5 ft 7 in (1.7 m)	Sr	Luleå gymnasieskola	Stockholm, Sweden
F	11	Alia Cordone	6 ft 2 in (1.88 m)	Fr	Western Reserve Academy	Davis, CA
G	12	Kassidy Thompson	5 ft 10 in (1.78 m)	Jr	Camden Catholic High School; Hofstra	Mullica Hill, NJ
G/F	20	Katie Ledden	6 ft 0 in (1.83 m)	Jr	Rutgers Preparatory School; Rhode Island	Clark, NJ
G	21	Eva DeChent	5 ft 11 in (1.8 m)	Jr	Rhode Island	Putnam Valley, NY
G	22	Sophie Sabino	5 ft 9 in (1.75 m)	Sr	Red Bank Catholic High School; Bucknell	Rumson, NJ
G	23	Elizabeth Lavoie	5 ft 11 in (1.8 m)	So	Pinkerton Academy	Derry, NH
G	24	Kenzie Matulonis	5 ft 7 in (1.7 m)	GS	Bridgewater-Raynham High School	Raynham, MA
G	30	Sydney Lusher	5 ft 11 in (1.8 m)	GS	Le Moyne	Oneida, NY
F	32	Lucia Melero Sabat	6 ft 0 in (1.83 m)	Sr	Institut Pompeu Fabra	Barcelona, Spain
F	33	Averie Harding	6 ft 2 in (1.88 m)	Fr	Egg Harbor Township High School	Egg Harbor Township, NJ

Head coach

- Megan Shoniker (Rhode Island)

Assistant coach(es)

- Kennedi Thompson (Binghamton)
- Jessica George (UMass)
- Alexa Brodie (Colgate)
- Maxwell Fink (Kent State)

Legend

- (C) Team captain
- (S) Suspended
- (I) Ineligible
- (W) Walk-on
- Injured
- Current redshirt

Roster
Last update: November 3, 2025

== Schedule and results ==
Date time, TV	Rank^{#}	Opponent^{#}	Result	Record	High points	High rebounds	High assists	Site (attendance) city, state
Non-conference regular season
November 3, 2025*; 6:00 p.m., ESPN+		Worcester State	W 72–32	1–0	16 – DeChent	6 – Tied	3 – Cavanaugh	Lundholm Gymnasium (246); Durham, NH
November 6, 2025*; 1:00 p.m., ACCNX/ESPN+		at Boston College	L 57–69	1–1	28 – DeChent	9 – DeChent	4 – Matulonis	Conte Forum (631); Chestnut Hill, MA
November 10, 2025*; 6:00 p.m., ESPN+		at Colgate	L 79–89	1–2	31 – DeChent	9 – DeChent	3 – Cavanaugh	Cotterell Court (270); Hamilton, NY
November 13, 2025*; 12:00 p.m., ESPN+		at Green Bay	L 64–76	1–3	19 – Fauria	6 – Tied	6 – Tied	Kress Events Center (2,647); Green Bay, WI
November 16, 2025*; 1:00 p.m., ESPN+		New England	W 76–29	2–3	26 – DeChent	4 – Lavoie	5 – Matulonis	Lundholm Gymnasium (287); Durham, NH
November 20, 2025*; 3:00 p.m., ESPN+		at Army	L 44–63	2–4	10 – Ledden	6 – Lavoie	3 – Cavanaugh	Christl Arena (597); West Point, NY
November 25, 2025*; 7:00 p.m., NESN/ESPN+		at Brown	L 60–68	2–5	15 – DeChent	7 – Lavoie	5 – Cavanaugh	Pizzitola Sports Center (309); Providence, RI
November 30, 2025*; 2:00 p.m., ESPN+		at Holy Cross	L 45–64	2–6	18 – DeChent	7 – Lavoie	4 – Cavanaugh	Hart Center (648); Worcester, MA
December 5, 2025*; 11:00 a.m., ESPN+		Merrimack	W 65–61	3–6	26 – DeChent	7 – DeChent	5 – Cavanaugh	Lundholm Gymnasium (956); Durham, NH
December 7, 2025*; 12:00 p.m., ESPN+		at No. 22 Louisville	L 43–94	3–7	12 – Cavanaugh	7 – Cavanaugh	3 – DeChent	KFC Yum! Center (6,653); Louisville, KY
December 17, 2025*; 11:00 a.m., NEC Front Row		at Central Connecticut	W 69–66	4–7	33 – DeChent	7 – DeChent	3 – Lavoie	William H. Detrick Gymnasium (2,209); New Britain, CT
December 20, 2025*; 1:00 p.m., ESPN+		Dartmouth	W 74–38	5–7	22 – DeChent	10 – Lavoie	7 – DeChent	Lundholm Gymnasium (481); Durham, NH
December 21, 2025*; 1:00 p.m., ESPN+		New Haven	W 64–59	6–7	24 – DeChent	7 – Tied	4 – DeChent	Lundholm Gymnasium (427); Durham, NH
America East regular season
January 1, 2026; 6:00 p.m., ESPN+		at Bryant	L 31–45	6–8 (0–1)	15 – DeChent	7 – Tied	1 – Tied	Chace Athletic Center (207); Smithfield, RI
January 3, 2026; 2:00 p.m., ESPN+		at Vermont	L 56–72	6–9 (0–2)	15 – DeChent	9 – DeChent	3 – Tied	Patrick Gymnasium (1,219); Burlington, VT
January 8, 2026; 6:00 p.m., ESPN+		NJIT	L 62–69	6–10 (0–3)	34 – DeChent	11 – DeChent	3 – Fauria	Lundholm Gymnasium (226); Durham, NH
January 10, 2026; 1:00 p.m., ESPN+		UMBC	L 47–58	6–11 (0–4)	9 – Tied	8 – Tied	3 – Tied	Lundholm Gymnasium (201); Durham, NH
January 17, 2026; 1:00 p.m., ESPN+		Maine	L 51–73	6–12 (0–5)	17 – Cavanaugh	8 – Ledden	2 – Tied	Lundholm Gymnasium (442); Durham, NH
January 22, 2026; 6:00 p.m., ESPN+		at Binghamton	L 42–50	6–13 (0–6)	12 – Tied	9 – Tied	3 – Matulonis	Dr. Bai Lee Court (1,337); Vestal, NY
January 24, 2026; 2:00 p.m., ESPN+		at Albany	W 56–51	7–13 (1–6)	17 – DeChent	7 – Cavanaugh	3 – Matulonis	Broadview Center (1,538); Albany, NY
January 29, 2026; 6:00 p.m., ESPN+		at UMass Lowell	W 62–58 ^{OT}	8–13 (2–6)	17 – DeChent	7 – Tied	3 – Tied	Kennedy Family Athletic Complex (218); Lowell, MA
January 31, 2026; 1:00 p.m., ESPN+		Bryant	L 45–51	8–14 (2–7)	15 – Cavanaugh	9 – Cavanaugh	2 – Matulonis	Lundholm Gymnasium (337); Durham, NH
February 7, 2026; 1:00 p.m., ESPN+		Vermont	L 35–60	8–15 (2–8)	8 – Lavoie	7 – Lavoie	1 – Tied	Lundholm Gymnasium (337); Durham, NH
February 12, 2026; 6:00 p.m., ESPN+		at NJIT	L 47–55	8–16 (2–9)	16 – Cavanaugh	7 – Cavanaugh	4 – Cavanaugh	Wellness and Events Center (278); Newark, NJ
February 14, 2026; 1:00 p.m., ESPN+		at UMBC	L 44–61	8–17 (2–10)	15 – DeChent	6 – Melero Sabat	3 – DeChent	Chesapeake Employers Insurance Arena (663); Baltimore, MD
February 19, 2026; 6:00 p.m., ESPN+		UMass Lowell; Play4Kay	L 54–57	8–18 (2–11)	29 – DeChent	6 – Tied	4 – Cavanaugh	Lundholm Gymnasium (199); Durham, NH
February 21, 2026; 1:00 p.m., ESPN+		at Maine	L 61–67	8–19 (2–12)	26 – DeChent	7 – Melero Sabat	4 – Tied	Memorial Gymnasium (1,151); Orono, ME
February 26, 2026; 6:00 p.m., ESPN+		Binghamton	W 67–48	9–19 (3–12)	23 – DeChent	7 – Melero Sabat	6 – DeChent	Lundholm Gymnasium (264); Durham, NH
February 28, 2026; 1:00 p.m., ESPN+		Albany	W 45–42	10–19 (4–12)	14 – DeChent	9 – Melero Sabat	6 – Cavanaugh	Lundholm Gymnasium (401); Durham, NH
America East tournament
March 5, 2026; 6:00 p.m., ESPN+	(7)	at (2) Maine; Quarterfinals	L 58–77	10–20	28 – DeChent	6 – Cavanaugh	2 – DeChent	Memorial Gymnasium (1,157); Orono, ME
*Non-conference game. ^{#}Rankings from AP Poll. (#) Tournament seedings in parentheses. All times are in Eastern Time.

== See also ==
- 2025–26 New Hampshire Wildcats men's basketball team
