= 2025–26 UMass Lowell River Hawks women's basketball team =

American college basketball season

2025–26 UMass Lowell River Hawks women's basketball
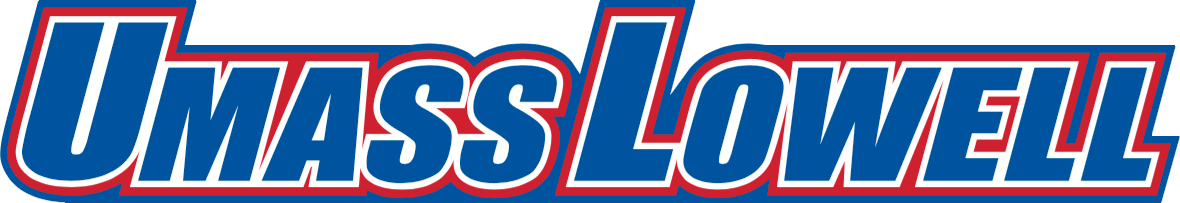
- Conference: America East Conference
- Record: 8–21 (2–14 America East)
- Head coach: Jon Plefka (1st season)
- Assistant coaches: Samera Marsh; Erica Balman; Amara Terry; James Navalance
- Home arena: Kennedy Family Athletic Complex

2025–26 America East Conference women's basketball standings
	Conf.				Overall
Team	W		L	PCT	W		L	PCT
Vermont †	13	–	3	.813	27	–	8	.771
Maine	12	–	4	.750	19	–	13	.594
Binghamton	10	–	6	.625	20	–	13	.606
UMBC	10	–	6	.625	17	–	15	.531
NJIT	9	–	7	.563	19	–	13	.594
Bryant	8	–	8	.500	18	–	12	.600
New Hampshire	4	–	12	.250	10	–	20	.333
Albany	4	–	12	.250	14	–	16	.467
UMass Lowell	2	–	14	.125	8	–	21	.276
† 2026 AmEast tournament winner

The 2025–26 UMass Lowell River Hawks women's basketball team represented the University of Massachusetts Lowell during the 2025–26 NCAA Division I women's basketball season. The River Hawks, led by first-year head coach Jon Plefka, played their home games at the Kennedy Family Athletic Complex as members of the America East Conference.

== Previous season ==
The River Hawks finished the 2024–25 season 3–25 and 1–15 in America East play to finish in ninth place. They failed to make the America East tournament.

On March 6, 2025, following the conclusion of the season, the school announced the departure of head coach Denise King after five seasons. In April 2025, the school announced the hiring of Stony Brook assistant coach Jon Plefka as the team's new head coach.

== Offseason ==
=== Departures ===
UMass Lowell departures
Name	Num	Pos.	Height	Year	Hometown	Reason for departure
Sille-Lis Mölder	2	G	5'10"	Freshman	Tallinn, Estonia	Transferred to Chipola (NJCAA)
Abbey Lindsey	5	G	5'8"	Sophomore	Staten Island, NY	Transferred to Bryant
Tasha Lima	9	G	5'7"	Senior	Roslindale, MA	Graduated
Rayne Durant	14	F	6'1"	Sophomore	New Haven, CT	Transferred to Howard
Sydney Watkins	15	G	5'8"	RS senior	Indianapolis, IN	Graduated
Alex Gitchenko	55	F	5'11"	Senior	Ashdod, Israel	Graduated

=== Incoming transfers ===
UMass Lowell incoming transfers
Name	Num	Pos.	Height	Year	Hometown	Previous school
Paris Gilmore	4	G	5'7"	Junior	Youngstown, OH	Pearl River CC (NJCAA)
Sabrina Larsson	5	G	5'8"	Senior	Uppsala, Sweden	Hofstra
Klimentina Modeva	13	F	6'8"	Sophomore	Ohrid, North Macedonia	Weatherford (NJCAA)
Anabel Latorre Ciria	18	F	6'2"	Graduate	Zaragoza, Spain	Florida A&M
Adna Halilbasic	24	F	6'2"	Sophomore	Recklinghausen, Germany	Louisiana Tech

=== Recruiting class ===
There was no recruiting class for 2025.

== Roster ==
2025–26 UMass Lowell River Hawks women's basketball team
Players
Coaches

Pos.	#	Name	Height	Year	Previous school	Hometown
G	0	Jennah Johnson	5 ft 8 in (1.73 m)	So	Woodbridge High School	Woodbridge, NJ
G	1	Amina Kameric	5 ft 9 in (1.75 m)	Sr	John F. Kennedy School, Berlin; Saskatchewan	Seattle, WA
G	2	Jaini Edmonds	5 ft 9 in (1.75 m)	Sr	Central Catholic High School	Worcester, MA
G	4	Paris Gilmore	5 ft 7 in (1.7 m)	Jr	Warrensville Heights High School; Pearl River CC	Youngstown, OH
G	5	Sabrina Larsson	5 ft 8 in (1.73 m)	Sr	Celsiusskolan; Independence CC; Hofstra	Uppsala, Sweden
G	6	Emina Kameric	5 ft 11 in (1.8 m)	So	John F. Kennedy School, Berlin	Seattle, WA
G	7	Carla Subirats	5 ft 5 in (1.65 m)	So	Institut Gorgs	Barcelona, Spain
G	10	Sophie Baydanov	5 ft 9 in (1.75 m)	Sr	Morehead State	Vienna, Austria
G	11	Tyanna Medina	5 ft 7 in (1.7 m)	Fr	Lawrence High School	Lawrence, MA
G	12	Maddie Rice	5 ft 8 in (1.73 m)	Jr	St. Anne's-Belfield School	Charlottesville, VA
F	13	Klimentina Modeva	6 ft 8 in (2.03 m)	So	OEMUC St. Naum of Ohrid; Weatherford College	Ohrid, North Macedonia
F	18	Anabel Latorre Ciria	6 ft 2 in (1.88 m)	GS	John Madejski Academy; Florida A&M	Zaragoza, Spain
F	21	Nia Chima	6 ft 1 in (1.85 m)	So	Crestwood Preparatory College	Toronto, Ontario
F	24	Adna Halilbasic	6 ft 2 in (1.88 m)	So	Hittorf Gymnasium; Louisiana Tech	Recklinghausen, Germany
G	30	Ella Ner	5 ft 7 in (1.7 m)	Sr	Ramat Hashrom	Bene Atarot, Israel

Head coach

- Jon Plefka (Texas Tech)

Assistant coach(es)

- Samera Marsh (Delaware State)
- Erica Balman (Monmouth)
- Amara Terry (Grand Canyon)
- James Navalance (Georgian Court)

Legend

- (C) Team captain
- (S) Suspended
- (I) Ineligible
- (W) Walk-on
- Injured
- Current redshirt

Roster

== Schedule and results ==
Date time, TV	Rank^{#}	Opponent^{#}	Result	Record	High points	High rebounds	High assists	Site (attendance) city, state
Non-conference regular season
November 3, 2025*; 4:00 p.m., ESPN+		Saint Anselm	W 54–50	1–0	15 – Tied	10 – Larsson	3 – Edmonds	Kennedy Family Athletic Complex (231); Lowell, MA
November 9, 2025*; 12:00 p.m., ACCNX		at Boston College	L 53–82	1–1	11 – Edmonds	5 – Tied	3 – Tied	Conte Forum (713); Chestnut Hill, MA
November 15, 2025*; 1:00 p.m., NEC Front Row		at Central Connectcut	W 70–54	2–1	23 – Rice	11 – Tied	4 – Gilmore	Detrick Gymnasium (312); New Britain, CT
November 18, 2025*; 6:00 p.m., ESPN+		at UMass	L 45–85	2–2	11 – Edmonds	7 – Latorre Ciria	4 – A. Kameric	Mullins Center (885); Amherst, MA
November 22, 2025*; 2:00 p.m., ESPN+		at Boston University	L 47–50	2–3	19 – Larsson	7 – Tied	4 – Edmonds	Case Gymnasium (648); Boston, MA
November 25, 2025*; 6:00 p.m., NESN+		Northeastern	L 46–51	2–4	14 – Gilmore	6 – Rice	3 – Tied	Kennedy Family Athletic Complex (209); Lowell, MA
November 30, 2025*; 1:00 p.m., ESPN+		Maine Fort Kent	W 82–36	3–4	18 – Edmonds	13 – Chima	5 – Gilmore	Kennedy Family Athletic Complex (172); Lowell, MA
December 3, 2025*; 7:00 p.m., ESPN+		at Iona	L 56–67	3–5	16 – Edmonds	9 – Modeva	5 – Gilmore	Hynes Athletics Center (630); New Rochelle, NY
December 6, 2025*; 1:00 p.m., NEC Front Row		at New Haven	W 60–43	4–5	22 – Larsson	8 – Latorre Ciria	3 – Rice	Jeffery P. Hazell Center (347); West Haven, CT
December 11, 2025*; 6:00 p.m., ESPN+		at DePaul	L 48–78	4–6	20 – Edmonds	8 – Latorre Ciria	5 – Gilmore	Wintrust Arena (839); Chicago, IL
December 14, 2025*; 6:00 p.m., ESPN+		LIU	W 73–72 ^{OT}	5–6	26 – Edmonds	10 – Edmonds	5 – Edmonds	Kennedy Family Athletic Complex (139); Lowell, MA
December 21, 2025*; 2:00 p.m., ESPN+		at Holy Cross	L 56–78	5–7	15 – Tied	7 – Medina	4 – Rice	Hart Center Arena (466); Worcester, MA
December 29, 2025*; 6:00 p.m., ESPN+		St. Joseph's (Brooklyn)	W 109–45	6–7	22 – Rice	19 – Latorre Ciria	6 – Tied	Kennedy Family Athletic Complex (161); Lowell, MA
America East regular season
January 1, 2026; 6:00 p.m., ESPN+		Maine	L 65–73	6–8 (0–1)	20 – Rice	6 – Tied	4 – Edmnods	Kennedy Family Athletic Complex (291); Lowell, MA
January 3, 2026; 2:00 p.m., ESPN+		at Albany	L 62–74	6–9 (0–2)	24 – Edmonds	8 – Latorre Ciria	3 – Gilmore	Broadview Center (1,486); Albany, NY
January 8, 2026; 6:00 p.m., ESPN+		Bryant	L 38–80	6–10 (0–3)	8 – Tied	10 – Chima	2 – Latorre Ciria	Kennedy Family Athletic Complex (131); Lowell, MA
January 10, 2026; 1:00 p.m., ESPN+		Binghamton	L 52–80	6–11 (0–4)	18 – Larsson	5 – Medina	5 – Edmonds	Kennedy Family Athletic Complex (184); Lowell, MA
January 15, 2026; 11:00 a.m., ESPN+		at NJIT	L 57–68	6–12 (0–5)	12 – Larsson	11 – Rice	3 – Gilmore	Wellness and Events Center (2,326); Newark, NJ
January 22, 2026; 11:00 a.m., ESPN+		at Vermont	L 46–82	6–13 (0–6)	16 – Edmonds	6 – Tied	3 – Edmonds	Patrick Gymnasium (2,171); Burlington, VT
January 24, 2026; 1:00 p.m., ESPN+		UMBC	L 52–75	6–14 (0–7)	20 – Edmonds	6 – Tied	3 – Tied	Kennedy Family Athletic Complex (282); Lowell, MA
January 29, 2026; 6:00 p.m., ESPN+		New Hampshire	L 58–62 ^{OT}	6–15 (0–8)	18 – Edmonds	13 – Chima	3 – Edmonds	Kennedy Family Athletic Complex (218); Lowell, MA
January 31, 2026; 1:00 p.m., ESPN+		Maine	L 42–92	6–16 (0–9)	13 – Edmonds	8 – Rice	3 – Tied	Memorial Gymnasium (1,165); Orono, ME
February 5, 2026; 6:00 p.m., ESPN+		NJIT	L 60–69	6–17 (0–10)	21 – Edmonds	8 – Chima	6 – Edmonds	Kennedy Family Athletic Complex (138); Lowell, MA
February 7, 2026; 1:00 p.m., ESPN+		Albany	W 58–45	7–17 (1–10)	18 – Rice	9 – Chima	5 – Rice	Kennedy Family Athletic Complex (225); Lowell, MA
February 12, 2026; 6:00 p.m., ESPN+		Bryant	L 36–77	7–18 (1–11)	17 – Edmonds	6 – Chima	1 – Tied	Chace Athletic Center (167); Smithfield, RI
February 19, 2026; 6:00 p.m., ESPN+		New Hampshire	W 57–54	8–18 (2–11)	24 – Gilmore	6 – Chima	5 – Edmonds	Lundholm Gymnasium (199); Durham, NH
February 21, 2026; 2:00 p.m., ESPN+		Binghamton	L 44–69	8–19 (2–12)	16 – Edmonds	5 – Edmonds	2 – Edmonds	Dr. Bai Lee Court (1,583); Vestal, NY
February 26, 2026; 6:00 p.m., ESPN+		Vermont	L 37–68	8–20 (2–13)	10 – Modeva	6 – Tied	2 – A. Kameric	Kennedy Family Athletic Complex (232); Lowell, MA
February 28, 2026; 4:00 p.m., ESPN+		UMBC	L 43–66	8–21 (2–14)	13 – Gilmore	10 – Modeva	2 – Gilmore	Chesapeake Employers Insurance Arena (898); Baltimore, MD
*Non-conference game. ^{#}Rankings from AP Poll. (#) Tournament seedings in parentheses. All times are in Eastern Time.
