= 2025–26 Atlantic Coast Conference women's basketball season =

- League: NCAA Division I
- Sport: Basketball
- Duration: November 3, 2025 – March 1, 2026
- Teams: 18
- TV partner(s): ACC Network, ESPN

WNBA Draft
- Top draft pick: Taina Mair, Duke
- Picked by: Seattle Storm, 14th overall

2025–26 NCAA Division I women's basketball season
- League champions: Duke
- Runners-up: Louisville
- Season MVP: Hannah Hidalgo, Notre Dame
- Top scorer: Hannah Hidalgo, Notre Dame – 25 ppg

ACC Tournament
- Champions: Duke
- Finals MVP: Tania Mair, Duke

Atlantic Coast Conference women's basketball seasons
- ← 2024–25 2026–27 →

2025–26 ACC women's basketball standings
	Conf.				Overall
Team	W		L	PCT	W		L	PCT
No. 5 Duke †	16	–	2	.889	27	–	9	.750
No. 11 Louisville	15	–	3	.833	29	–	8	.784
No. 13 North Carolina	14	–	4	.778	28	–	8	.778
NC State	13	–	5	.722	21	–	11	.656
No. 9 Notre Dame	12	–	6	.667	25	–	10	.714
Virginia Tech	12	–	6	.667	23	–	10	.697
Syracuse	12	–	6	.667	24	–	9	.727
No. 19 Virginia	11	–	7	.611	22	–	12	.647
Clemson	11	–	7	.611	21	–	12	.636
California	9	–	9	.500	21	–	15	.583
Georgia Tech	8	–	10	.444	14	–	19	.424
Miami (FL)	8	–	10	.444	18	–	15	.545
Stanford	8	–	10	.444	21	–	14	.600
Florida State	5	–	13	.278	10	–	21	.323
Wake Forest	4	–	14	.222	14	–	18	.438
SMU	2	–	16	.111	9	–	21	.300
Pittsburgh	1	–	17	.056	8	–	23	.258
Boston College	1	–	17	.056	5	–	26	.161
† 2026 ACC tournament winner Rankings from AP Poll

The 2025–26 Atlantic Coast Conference women's basketball season began with practices in October 2025, followed by the start of the 2025–26 NCAA Division I women's basketball season in November. Conference play started in December 2025 and ended on March 1, 2026. After the regular season, the 2026 ACC women's basketball tournament was held at the Gas South Arena in Duluth, Georgia.

Duke finished as regular season champions with a 16–2 regular season record. Hannah Hidalgo from Notre Dame finished as the league's leading scorer in the regular season and was selected as ACC Player of the Year. Duke was the top seed in the 2026 ACC women's basketball tournament, and defeated second-seed Louisville in overtime in the Final. The ACC had nine teams selected to the NCAA tournament with Duke and Notre Dame making it the furthest in the tournament, both qualifying for the Elite Eight.

== Head coaches ==
=== Coaching changes ===
- After the 2024–25 season, on March 31, 2025, Georgia Tech head coach Nell Fortner announced her retirement after six years as head coach. Karen Blair was announced as her replacement on April 6, 2025.
- SMU fired head coach Toyelle Wilson after four years in charge on March 30, 2025. Adia Barnes was announced as SMU's new head coach on April 5, 2025.

=== Coaches ===
Team	Head coach	Previous job	Years at school	Record at school	ACC record	ACC titles	NCAA tournaments	NCAA Final Fours	NCAA Championships
Boston College	Joanna Bernabei-McNamee	Albany	8	108–106	42–77	0	0	0	0
California	Charmin Smith	New York Liberty (Asst.)	7	81–89	12–6	0	1	0	0
Clemson	Shawn Poppie	Chattanooga	2	14–17	6–12	0	0	0	0
Duke	Kara Lawson	Boston Celtics (Asst.)	6	97–41	46–27	1	3	0	0
Florida State	Brooke Wyckoff	Florida State (Asst.)	5	80–39	46–24	0	4	0	0
Georgia Tech	Karen Blair	Maryland (Asst.)	1	0–0	0–0	0	0	0	0
Louisville	Jeff Walz	Maryland (Asst.)	19	486–146	227–73	1	10	4	0
Miami	Tricia Cullop	Toledo	2	14–15	4–14	0	0	0	0
NC State	Wes Moore	Chattanooga	13	301–95	145–56	3	9	1	0
North Carolina	Courtney Banghart	Princeton	7	125–64	63–44	0	5	0	0
Notre Dame	Niele Ivey	Memphis Grizzlies (Asst.)	6	117–38	65–22	1	4	0	0
Pittsburgh	Tory Verdi	UMass	3	21–43	7–29	0	0	0	0
SMU	Adia Barnes	Arizona	1	0–0	0–0	0	0	0	0
Stanford	Kate Paye	Stanford (Assoc.)	2	16–15	8–10	0	0	0	0
Syracuse	Felisha Legette-Jack	Buffalo	4	56–39	28–26	0	1	0	0
Virginia	Amaka Agugua-Hamilton	Missouri State	4	48–46	19–35	0	0	0	0
Virginia Tech	Megan Duffy	Marquette	2	19–13	9–9	0	0	0	0
Wake Forest	Megan Gebbia	American	4	33–62	9–45	0	0	0	0

Notes:

- Year at school includes 2025–26 season.
- Overall and ACC records are from time at current school and are through the end the 2024–25 season.
- NCAA tournament appearances are from time at current school only.
- NCAA Final Fours and Championship include time at other schools

== Preseason ==
=== Preseason watch lists ===
Below is a table of notable preseason watch lists.

**Wooden Award**	**Naismith**	**Lieberman**	**Drysdale**	**Miller**	**McClain**	**Leslie**
Toby Fournier – Duke; Ashlon Jackson – Duke; Laura Ziegler – Louisville; Gal Raviv – Miami (FL); Zoe Brooks – NC State / Khamil Pierre – NC State; Reniya Kelly – North Carolina; Hannah Hidalgo – Notre Dame; Kymora Johnson – Virginia	Toby Fournier – Duke; Ashlon Jackson – Duke; Tajianna Roberts – Louisville; Laura Ziegler – Louisville; Zoe Brooks – NC State / Khamil Pierre – NC State; Reniya Kelly – North Carolina; Hannah Hidalgo – Notre Dame; Nunu Agara – Stanford; Kymora Johnson – Virginia	Rachel Rose – Clemson; Taina Mair – Duke; Zoe Brooks – NC State; Reniya Kelly – North Carolina; Hannah Hidalgo – Notre Dame; Kymora Johnson – Virginia	Lulu Twidale – California; Ashlon Jackson – Duke; Tajianna Roberts – Louisville; Zamareya Jones – NC State; Laila Phelia – Syracuse	Jadyn Donovan – Duke; Skylar Jones – Louisville; Nyla Harris – North Carolina	Toby Fournier – Duke; Allie Kubek – Florida State; Khamil Pierre – NC State; Nunu Agara – Stanford; Sa'Myah Smith – Virginia	Sakima Walker – California; Laura Ziegler – Louisville; Ra Shayla Kyle – Miami (FL); Tilda Trygger – NC State; Kennedy Umeh – Stanford

=== ACC Women's Basketball Tip-off ===
The preseason poll and Preseason All-ACC Teams were released on October 14, before the season began and following ACC Media Day. The results of the poll and voting for the preseason players of the year are below.

==== ACC Preseason poll ====
	Team	Points
1	Duke	1,525 (40)
2	NC State	1,487 (25)
3	North Carolina	1,374 (1)
4	Louisville	1,276 (2)
5	Notre Dame	1,255 (2)
6	Stanford	1,041
7	Virginia	987
8	Miami	889
9	Florida State	857
10	Virginia Tech	813
11	Clemson	738
12	California	669
13	Syracuse	540
14	SMU	483
15	Georgia Tech	447
16	Pittsburgh	299
17	Boston College	211
18	Wake Forest	157
Reference: (#) first-place votes

==== Preseason All-ACC Team ====
Player	Position	Class	School	Points
**Hannah Hidalgo**	Guard	Junior	Notre Dame	833
Zoe Brooks	Guard	Junior	NC State	606
Kymora Johnson	Guard	Junior	Virginia	577
Toby Fournier	Forward	Sophomore	Duke	535
Ashlon Jackson	Guard	Senior	Duke	333
Tajianna Roberts	Guard	Sophomore	Louisville	326
Khamil Pierre	Forward	Junior	NC State	285
Reniya Kelly	Guard	Senior	North Carolina	276
Nunu Agara	Forward	Junior	Stanford	275
Laura Ziegler	Forward	Sennior	Louisville	78

ACC Preseason Player of the Year shown in Bold.

==== Preseason All-Freshman Team ====
Position	Player	School	Votes
Guard	Emilee Skinner	Duke	415
Guard	Hailee Swain	Stanford	324
Guard	Nyla Brooks	North Carolina	310
Forward	Lara Somfai	Stanford	185
Guard	Aliyahna Morris	California	114
Forward	Leah Macy	Notre Dame	79

== Regular season ==
=== Records against other conferences ===
2025–26 records against non-conference foes. Records shown for regular season only.
Updated through games played on December 28, 2025

Power 4 Conferences	Record
Big East	1–5
Big Ten	2–7
Big 12	3–9
SEC	5–20
Power 4 Conferences Total	11–41
Other NCAA Division 1 Conferences	Record
America East	6–2
American	2–1
A-10	3–2
ASUN	6–2
Big Sky	2–0
Big South	14–0
Big West	3–0
CAA	7–4
C-USA	4–0
Horizon	2–0
Ivy League	4–2
MAAC	6–1
MAC	3–1
MEAC	11–0
MVC	2–1
Mountain West	3–1
NEC	9–0
OVC	3–0
Patriot League	6–2
SoCon	7–0
Southland	2–0
SWAC	4–0
Summit League	2–0
Sun Belt	8–1
WAC	0–0
WCC	5–0
Other Division I Total	126–19
NCAA Division I Total	137–62
NCAA Division III Total	0–1

=== Record against ranked non-conference opponents ===
This is a list of games against ranked opponents only (rankings from the AP Poll):

Date	Visitor	Home	Site	Significance	Score	Conference record
November 3	**California**	No. 19 Vanderbilt†	Adidas Arena • Paris, France	Aflac Oui-Play	**L** 52–58	0–1
November 3	No. 7 **Duke**	No. 16 Baylor†	Adidas Arena • Paris, France	Aflac Oui-Play	**L** 65–74	0–2
November 4	No. 8 Tennessee	No. 16 **NC State**	First Horizon Coliseum • Greensboro, NC	Battle in the 'Boro	**W** 80–77	1–2
November 4	No. 1 Connecticut	No. 20 **Louisville**†	Ramstein Air Base • Kaiserslautern, Germany	Armed Forces Classic	**L** 66–79	1–3
November 9	**Florida State**	No. 1 Connecticut	Harry A. Gampel Pavilion • Storrs, CT	Ally Tipoff	**L** 67–99	1–4
November 9	No. 18 USC	No. 16 **NC State**	Spectrum Center • Charlotte, NC	Ally Tipoff	**L** 68–69	1–5
November 11	**Clemson**	No. 2 South Carolina	Colonial Life Arena • Columbia, SC	Rivalry	**L** 37–65	1–6
November 13	No. 11 **North Carolina**	No. 3 UCLA†	Michelob Ultra Arena • Paradise, NV	WBCA Challenge	**L** 60–78	1–7
November 15	No. 18 **Notre Dame**	No. 14 Michigan†	Wayne State Fieldhouse • Detroit, MI	Citi Shamrock Classic	**L** 54–93	1–8
November 16	No. 17 TCU	No. 10 **NC State**	Reynolds Coliseum • Raleigh, NC		**L** 59–69	1–9
November 21	No. 11 USC	No. 24 **Notre Dame**	Purcell Pavilion • Notre Dame, IN		**W** 61–59	2–9
November 22	No. 20 Kentucky	No. 21 **Louisville**	KFC Yum! Center • Louisville, KY	Rivalry	**L** 62–72	2–10
November 22	**Miami**	No. 19 Iowa†	ESPN Wide World of Sports Complex • Orlando, FL	WBCA Showcase	**L** 61–64	2–11
November 23	**Syracuse**	No. 6 Michigan†	Mohegan Sun Arena • Uncasville, CT	Hall of Fame Women's Showcase	**L** 55–81	2–12
November 26	**Duke**	No. 2 South Carolina†	Michelob Ultra Arena • Paradise, NV	Players Era Championship	**L** 66–83	2–13
November 27	**Duke**	No. 3 UCLA†	Michelob Ultra Arena • Paradise, NV	Players Era Championship	**L** 59–89	2–14
November 29	**Miami**	No. 24 Oklahoma State†	John Gray Gymnasium • George Town, Cayman Islands	Cayman Islands Classic	**L** 84–87	2–15
November 30	**Clemson**	No. 20 Michigan State†	Baha Mar Convention Center • Nassau, The Bahamas	Baha Mar Hoops Championship	**L** 64–72	2–16
November 30	**Florida State**	No. 9 Oklahoma	Alico Arena • Fort Myers, FL	Coconut Hoops	**L** 91–109	2–17
December 3	No. 17 Kentucky	**Miami**	Watsco Center • Coral Gables, FL	ACC–SEC Challenge	**L** 48–64	2–18
December 3	**NC State**	No. 9 Oklahoma	Lloyd Noble Center • Norman, OK	ACC–SEC Challenge	**L** 98–103^{OT}	2–19
December 3	No. 19 Tennessee	**Stanford**	Maples Pavilion • Stanford, CA	ACC–SEC Challenge	**L** 62–65	2–20
December 3	**Virginia**	No. 15 Vanderbilt	Memorial Gymnasium • Nashville, TN	ACC–SEC Challenge	**L** 68–81	2–21
December 4	No. 5 LSU	**Duke**	Cameron Indoor Stadium • Durham, NC	ACC–SEC Challenge	**L** 77–93	2–22
December 4	No. 11 **North Carolina**	No. 2 Texas	Moody Center • Austin, TX	ACC–SEC Challenge	**L** 64–79	2–23
December 4	No. 18 **Notre Dame**	No. 13 Ole Miss	SJB Pavilion • Oxford, MS	ACC–SEC Challenge	**L** 62–69	2–24
December 4	No. 3 South Carolina	No. 22 **Louisville**	KFC Yum! Center • Louisville, KY	ACC–SEC Challenge	**L** 77–79	2–25
December 19	No. 22 Washington	**Stanford**	Maples Pavilion • Stanford, CA		**W** 67–62	3–25
December 20	No. 16 **Louisville**	No. 17 Tennessee†	Barclays Center • Brooklyn, NY	Women's Champions Classic	**W** 89–65	4–25
December 21	**California**	No. 19 USC†	Chase Center • San Francisco, CA	Invisalign Bay Area Women's Classic	**L** 57–61	4–26
January 19	**Notre Dame**	No. 1 Connecticut	Harry A. Gampel Pavilion • Storrs, CT	Rivalry	**L** 47–85	4–27

Team rankings are reflective of AP poll when the game was played, not current or final ranking
ACC team shown in bold.
† denotes game was played on neutral site

=== Rankings ===
Legend
Increase in ranking
Decrease in ranking
Not ranked previous week
First Place votes shown in ()

		Pre	Wk 2	Wk 3	Wk 4	Wk 5	Wk 6	Wk 7	Wk 8	Wk 9	Wk 10	Wk 11	Wk 12	Wk 13	Wk 14	Wk 15	Wk 16	Wk 17	Wk 18	Wk 19	Wk 20	Final
Boston College	AP									N/A												
Boston College	C																					
California	AP									N/A												
California	C	RV																				
Clemson	AP									N/A												
Clemson	C									RV												
Duke	AP	7	15	RV						N/A	RV	RV	21	20	17	11	9	12	13	8	8	5
Duke	C	6	11	24	RV	RV	RV	RV	RV	RV		RV	RV	RV	22	15	13	14	14	10	10	5
Florida State	AP									N/A												
Florida State	C	RV																				
Georgia Tech	AP									N/A												
Georgia Tech	C																					
Louisville	AP	20	22	21	23	22	22	16	13	N/A	10	9	8	7	6	9	8	10	12	13	13	11
Louisville	C	19	21	19	22	21	20	17	13	13	11	10	7т	7	6	9	8	11	12	14	14	11
Miami	AP									N/A												
Miami	C																					
North Carolina	AP	11	11	14	12	11	12	18	16	N/A	22	RV	RV	RV	25	21	22	21	16	15	15	13
North Carolina	C	11	8	12	10	10	11	16	15	15	18	23	21	23	21	21	22	19	16	15	15	13
NC State	AP	9	10	16	25	RV	RV	RV	RV	N/A	RV	RV	RV	RV	RV	RV		RV	RV			RV
NC State	C	8	9	16	24	25	RV				RV				RV	RV			RV			RV
Notre Dame	AP	15	18	24	19	18	19	20	18	N/A	RV	23	RV					RV	RV	22	22	9
Notre Dame	C	13	17	23	19	19	19	20	18	18	25	22	RV					RV	RV	25	25	14
Pittsburgh	AP									N/A												
Pittsburgh	C																					
SMU	AP									N/A												
SMU	C																					
Stanford	AP	RV	RV	RV	RV	RV	RV		RV	N/A	RV	RV										
Stanford	C	RV	RV		RV	RV			RV	RV	RV											
Syracuse	AP									N/A			RV		RV		RV	RV				RV
Syracuse	C		RV																			
Virginia	AP									N/A								RV				19
Virginia	C		RV										RV									24
Virginia Tech	AP									N/A												
Virginia Tech	C														RV							
Wake Forest	AP									N/A												
Wake Forest	C																					

=== Conference Matrix ===
This table summarizes the head-to-head results between teams in conference play.

	Boston College	California	Clemson	Duke	Florida State	Georgia Tech	Louisville	Miami	North Carolina	NC State	Notre Dame	Pittsburgh	SMU	Stanford	Syracuse	Virginia	Virginia Tech	Wake Forest
vs. Boston College	–	73–58	83–59	100–49	85–76	70–60	85–56	82–70	90–39	106–84	94–60	64–61	59–77	77–52	93–59; 90–65	81–55	78–56	79–65
vs. California	58–73	–	70–63	78–74	62–75	56–63	71–59	69–60	71–55	71–60	69–80	80–95	34–78	78–69; 71–78^{OT}	90–87^{3OT}	58–64	68–58	52–61
vs. Clemson	59–83	63–70	–	51–53	58–77	58–55; 65–67^{2OT}	65–54	55–70	53–44	65–75	58–65	41–73	54–83	85–50	68–64	73–63	71–68	71–78^{OT}
vs. Duke	49–100	74–78	53–51	–	52–80	46–93	58–59	58–74	68–72; 74–69	65–83	68–82	41–95	36–95	60–67	51–71	58–65	54–70	44–80
vs. Florida State	76–85	75–62	77–58	80–52	–	80–69	88–65	89–73; 70–87	82–55	83–55	93–58	65–69	51–73	77–61	82–72	91–87^{2OT}	79–54	74–77^{OT}
vs. Georgia Tech	60–70	63–56	55–58; 67–65^{2OT}	93–46	69–80	–	69–50	49–79	54–46	87–58	90–95^{OT}	68–84	59–67	52–74	94–70	61–59	62–51	57–56
vs. Louisville	56–85	59–71	54–65	59–58	65–88	50–69	–	68–77	66–76^{OT}	80–88^{OT}	66–79; 65–62	46–86	58–91	66–84	65–84	74–72	60–85	67–86
vs. Miami	70–82	60–69	70–55	74–58	73–89; 87–70	79–49	77–68	–	73–62	87–61	74–66	58–79	66–75	51–66	65–60	67–56	67–75^{OT}	61–64
vs. North Carolina	39–90	55–71	44–53	72–68; 69–74	55–82	46–54	76–66^{OT}	62–73	–	59–61	73–50	50–78	42–94	77–71^{OT}	71–77^{OT}	70–82	63–66^{OT}	56–84
vs. NC State	84–106	60–71	75–65	83–65	55–83	58–87	88–80^{OT}	61–87	61–59	–	79–67	43–93	54–91	46–74	69–82	76–78^{OT}	62–82	77–95; 56–65
vs. Notre Dame	60–94	80–69	65–58	82–68	58–93	95–90^{OT}	79–66; 62–65	66–74	50–73	67–79	–	59–94	63–88	66–78	62–72	81–70	70–80	54–78
vs. Pittsburgh	61–64	95–80	73–41	95–41	69–65	84–68	86–46	79–58	78–50	93–43	94–59	–	83–76; 79–78	86–65	84–51	84–46	67–50	74–55
vs. SMU	77–59	78–34	83–54	95–36	73–51	67–59	91–58	75–66	94–42	91–54	88–63	76–83; 78–79	–	87–57	78–69	76–52	79–42	70–65
vs. Stanford	52–77	69–78; 78–71^{OT}	50–85	67–60	61–77	74–52	84–66	66–51	71–77^{OT}	74–46	78–66	65–83	57–87	–	69–58	75–69	79–67	43–55
vs. Syracuse	59–93; 65–90	87–90^{3OT}	64–68	71–51	72–82	70–94	84–65	60–65	77–71^{OT}	82–69	72–62	51–84	69–78	58–69	–	60–79	77–57	58–73
vs. Virginia	55–81	64–58	63–73	65–58	87–91^{2OT}	59–61	72–74	56–67	82–70	78–76^{OT}	70–81	46–84	52–76	69–75	79–60	–	76–64; 83–82	103–109^{3OT}
vs. Virginia Tech	56–78	58–68	68–71	70–54	54–79	51–62	85–60	75–67^{OT}	66–63^{OT}	82–62	80–70	50–67	42–79	67–79	57–77	64–76; 82–83	–	57–85
vs. Wake Forest	65–79	61–52	78–71^{OT}	80–44	77–74^{OT}	56–57	86–67	64–61	84–56	95–77; 65–56	78–54	55–74	65–70	55–43	73–58	109–103^{3OT}	85–57	–
Total	1–17	9–9	11–7	16–2	5–13	8–10	15–3	8–10	14–4	13–5	12–6	1–17	2–16	8–10	12–6	11–7	12–6	4–14

=== Player of the week ===
Throughout the conference regular season, the Atlantic Coast Conference offices name a Player(s) of the week and a Rookie(s) of the week.

Week	Date Awarded	Player of the week	Rookie of the week	Reference
Week 1	November 10, 2025	Hannah Hidalgo – Notre Dame	Lara Somfai – Stanford	
Week 2	November 17, 2025	Hannah Hidalgo (2) – Notre Dame	Puff Morris – California	
Week 3	November 24, 2025	Nunu Agara – Stanford	Nyla Brooks – North Carolina	
Week 4	December 1, 2025	Indya Nivar – North Carolina	Uche Izoje – Syracuse	
Week 5	December 8, 2025	Hannah Hidalgo (3) – Notre Dame	Uche Izoje (2) – Syracuse	
Week 6	December 15, 2025	Laura Ziegler – Louisville	Lara Somfai (2) – Stanford	
Week 6	December 15, 2025	Courtney Ogden – Stanford	Lara Somfai (2) – Stanford	
Week 7	December 22, 2025	Kymora Johnson – Virginia	Uche Izoje (3) – Syracuse	
Week 8	December 29, 2025	Grace Oliver – Wake Forest	Lara Somfai (3) – Stanford	
Week 9	January 5, 2026	Talayah Walker – Georgia Tech	Uche Izoje (4) – Syracuse	
Week 10	January 12, 2026	Hannah Hidalgo (4) – Notre Dame	Arianna Roberson – Duke	
Week 11	January 19, 2026	Imari Berry – Louisville	Uche Izoje (5) – Syracuse	
Week 12	January 26, 2026	Zoe Brooks – NC State	Uche Izoje (6) – Syracuse	
Week 13	February 2, 2026	Hannah Hidalgo (5) – Notre Dame	Milan Brown – Wake Forest	
Week 14	February 9, 2026	Toby Fournier – Duke	Lara Somfai (4) – Stanford	
Week 15	February 16, 2026	Sophie Burrows – Syracuse	Theresa Hagans Jr. – Pittsburgh	
Week 16	February 23, 2026	Hannah Hidalgo (6) – Notre Dame	Uche Izoje (7) – Syracuse	
Week 17	March 2, 2026	Hannah Hidalgo (7) – Notre Dame	Uche Izoje (8) – Syracuse	

== Postseason ==
=== ACC Tournament ===
- The 2026 Atlantic Coast Conference Basketball Tournament will be held at the Gas South Arena in Duluth, Georgia, from March 4-8, 2026.

First round Wednesday, March 4
12	Miami	83*
13	Stanford	76
10	California	75
15	Wake Forest	52
11	Georgia Tech	72
14	Florida State	60

Second round Thursday, March 5
8	Virginia	50
9	Clemson	63
5	Notre Dame	69
12	Miami	54
7	Syracuse	70
10	California	59
6	Virginia Tech	62
11	Georgia Tech	54

Quarterfinals; Friday, March 6
1	13 Duke	60
9	Clemson	46
4	NC State	63
5	Notre Dame	81
2	12 Louisville	87
7	Syracuse	61
3	16 North Carolina	85
6	Virginia Tech	68

Semifinals; Saturday, March 7
1	13 Duke	65
5	Notre Dame	63
2	12 Louisville	65
3	16 North Carolina	57

Championship; Sunday, March 8
1	13 Duke	70*
2	12 Louisville	65

* denotes overtime period

=== NCAA tournament ===
Seed	Region	School	First Four	1st Round	2nd Round	Sweet 16	Elite Eight	Final Four	Championship
3	Sacramento 2	Duke	Bye	W 81–64 vs. (14) Charleston	W 69–48 vs. (6) Baylor	W 87–85 (2) LSU	L 58–70 vs. (1) UCLA	DNP	
3	Fort Worth 3	Louisville	Bye	W 72–52 vs. (14) Vermont	W 69–68 vs. (6) Alabama	L 52–71 vs. (2) Michigan	DNP		
4	Fort Worth 1	North Carolina	Bye	W 83–51 vs. (13) Western Illinois	W 74–66 vs. (5) Maryland	L 42–63 vs. (1) Connecticut	DNP		
6	Fort Worth 1	Notre Dame	Bye	W 79–60 vs. (11) Fairfield	W 83–73 vs. (3) Ohio State	W 67–67 vs. (2) Vanderbilt	L 52–70 vs. (1) Connecticut	DNP	
7	Fort Worth 3	NC State	Bye	W 76–61 vs. (10) Tennessee	L 63–92 vs. (2) Michigan	DNP			
8	Sacramento 4	Clemson	Bye	L 67–71 ^{(OT)} vs. (9) USC	DNP				
9	Fort Worth 1	Syracuse	Bye	W 72–63 vs. (8) Iowa State	L 45–98 vs. (1) Connecticut	DNP			
9	Fort Worth 3	Virginia Tech	Bye	L 60–70 vs. (8) Oregon	DNP				
10	Sacramento 4	Virginia	W 57–55 vs. (10) Arizona State	W 82–73 ^{(OT)} vs. (7) Georgia	W 83–75 ^{(2OT)} vs. (2) Iowa	L 69–79 vs. (3) TCU	DNP		
		W–L (%):	1–0 (1.000)	7–2 (.778)	5–2 (.714)	2–3 (.400)	0–2 (.000)	0–0 (–)	0–0 (–)
Total: 15–9 (.625)

=== WBIT tournament ===
Seed	Region	School	1st Round	2nd Round	Quarterfinals	Semifinals	Championship
2	Utah	Miami	W 82–56 vs. Georgia Southern	L 65–72 vs. (3) Wisconsin	DNP		
2	BYU	Stanford	W 80–76 vs. LMU	W 81–69 vs. Quinnipiac	L 61–76 @ (1) BYU	DNP	
3	North Dakota State	California	W 72–68 vs. Santa Clara	W 83–75 @ (2) Kansas State	L 68–74 vs. (4) Columbia	DNP	
—	North Dakota State	Georgia Tech	L 65–69 @ (2) Kansas State	DNP			
		W–L (%):	3–1 (.750)	2–1 (.667)	0–2 (.000)	0–0 (–)	0–0 (–)
Total: 5–4 (.556)

== Honors and awards ==
=== All-Americans ===
Associated Press	TSN	USBWA	ESPN
First Team
None	Hannah Hidalgo	Hannah Hidalgo	Hannah Hidalgo
Second Team
Hannah Hidalgo	Ta'Niya Latson	None	Ta'Niya Latson
Third Team
Toby Fournier	—N/a	Toby Fournier	—N/a

=== ACC Awards ===
2025-26 ACC Women's Basketball Individual Awards; Blue Ribbon Panel Votes
Award	Recipient(s)
Player of the Year	Hannah Hidalgo – Notre Dame
Coach of the Year	Kara Lawson – Duke
Defensive Player of the Year	Hannah Hidalgo – Notre Dame
Freshman of the Year	Uche Izoje – Syracuse
Sixth Player of the Year	Imari Berry – Louisville
Most Improved Player	Cassandre Prosper – Notre Dame

2025-26 ACC Women's Basketball Individual Awards; Coaches Votes
Award	Recipient(s)
Player of the Year	Hannah Hidalgo – Notre Dame
Coach of the Year	Kara Lawson – Duke
Defensive Player of the Year	Hannah Hidalgo – Notre Dame
Freshman of the Year	Uche Izoje – Syracuse
Sixth Player of the Year	Imari Berry – Louisville
Most Improved Player	Cassandre Prosper – Notre Dame

2025-26 ACC Women's Basketball All-Conference Teams; Blue Ribbon Votes
First Team	Second Team	Freshman Team
Hannah Hidalgo – Notre Dame; Toby Fournier – Duke; Kymora Johnson – Virginia; Khamil Pierre – NC State; Zoe Brooks – NC State; Uche Izoje – Syracuse; Laura Ziegler – Louisville; Taina Mair – Duke; Ra Shaya Kyle – Miami; Talayah Walker – Georgia Tech	Nyla Harris – North Carolina; Lulu Twidale – California; Ashlon Jackson – Duke; Tajianna Roberts – Louisville; Nunu Agara – Stanford; Carleigh Wenzel – Virginia Tech; Mia Moore – Clemson; Indya Nivar – North Carolina; Cassandre Prosper – Notre Dame; Imari Berry – Louisville	Uche Izoje – Syracuse; Lara Somfai – Stanford; Arianna Roberson – Duke; Nyla Brooks – North Carolina; Theresa Hagans – Pittsburgh; Milan Brown – Wake Forest

2025-26 ACC Women's Basketball All-Conference Teams; Coaches Votes
First Team	Second Team	Freshman Team
Hannah Hidalgo – Notre Dame; Toby Fournier – Duke; Kymora Johnson – Virginia; Khamil Pierre – NC State; Zoe Brooks – NC State; Uche Izoje – Syracuse; Laura Ziegler – Louisville; Nyla Harris – North Carolina; Tajianna Roberts – Louisville; Ashlon Jackson – Duke	Taina Mair – Duke; Ra Shaya Kyle – Miami; Mia Moore – Clemson; Lulu Twidale – California; Carleigh Wenzel – Virginia Tech; Carys Baker – Virginia Tech; Nunu Agara – Stanford; Talayah Walker – Georgia Tech; Indya Nivar – North Carolina; Laila Phelia – Syracuse	Uche Izoje – Syracuse; Arianna Roberson – Duke; Lara Somfai – Stanford; Nyla Brooks – North Carolina; Hailee Swain – Stanford; Theresa Hagans – Pittsburgh

2025-26 ACC Women's Basketball All-ACC Defensive Team; Blue Ribbon Votes
Player	Team	Votes
Hannah Hidalgo	Notre Dame	326
Toby Fournier	Duke	215
Uche Izoje	Syracuse	197
Indya Nivar	North Carolina	121
Taina Mair	Duke	103
Brianna Turnage	Georgia Tech	83

2025-26 ACC Women's Basketball All-ACC Defensive Team; Coaches Votes
Player	Team	Votes
Hannah Hidalgo	Notre Dame	102
Toby Fournier	Duke	60
Uche Izoje	Syracuse	55
Indya Nivar	North Carolina	53
Taina Mair	Duke	30
Brianna Turnage	Georgia Tech	19

== WNBA draft ==
Player	Team	Round	Pick #	Position	School
Taina Mair	Seattle Storm	1	14	G	Duke
Cassandre Prosper	Washington Mystics	2	19	G	Notre Dame
Ashlon Jackson	Golden State Valkyries	2	23	G	Duke
Indya Nivar	Atlanta Dream	2	28	G	North Carolina
