= 2025–26 Pittsburgh Panthers women's basketball team =

Intercollegiate basketball season

2025–26 Pittsburgh Panthers women's basketball
- Conference: Atlantic Coast Conference
- Record: 8–23 (1–17 ACC)
- Head coach: Tory Verdi (3rd season)
- Assistant coaches: Candice Finley (3rd season); Anthony Brammer (3rd season); Devan Newman (2nd season); Abby Anderson (1st season)
- Home arena: Petersen Events Center

2025–26 ACC women's basketball standings
	Conf.				Overall
Team	W		L	PCT	W		L	PCT
No. 5 Duke †	16	–	2	.889	27	–	9	.750
No. 11 Louisville	15	–	3	.833	29	–	8	.784
No. 13 North Carolina	14	–	4	.778	28	–	8	.778
NC State	13	–	5	.722	21	–	11	.656
No. 9 Notre Dame	12	–	6	.667	25	–	10	.714
Virginia Tech	12	–	6	.667	23	–	10	.697
Syracuse	12	–	6	.667	24	–	9	.727
No. 19 Virginia	11	–	7	.611	22	–	12	.647
Clemson	11	–	7	.611	21	–	12	.636
California	9	–	9	.500	21	–	15	.583
Georgia Tech	8	–	10	.444	14	–	19	.424
Miami (FL)	8	–	10	.444	18	–	15	.545
Stanford	8	–	10	.444	21	–	14	.600
Florida State	5	–	13	.278	10	–	21	.323
Wake Forest	4	–	14	.222	14	–	18	.438
SMU	2	–	16	.111	9	–	21	.300
Pittsburgh	1	–	17	.056	8	–	23	.258
Boston College	1	–	17	.056	5	–	26	.161
† 2026 ACC tournament winner Rankings from AP Poll

The 2025–26 Pittsburgh Panthers women's basketball team represented the University of Pittsburgh during the 2025–26 NCAA Division I women's basketball season. The Panthers were led by third-year head coach Tory Verdi, and played their home games at the Petersen Events Center in Pittsburgh, Pennsylvania as members of the Atlantic Coast Conference (ACC).

The Panthers began their season with an eight-point loss to Drexel. They rebounded by winning four of their next six games, with the losses coming at home to Scranton and Lafayette. Pittsburgh then traveled to Fort Myers, Florida to participate in the Florida Gulf Coast Classic. They lost to Ball State and defeated Chicago State in the tournament. They continued to hover around .500, but lost their ACC–SEC Challenge game against Mississippi State and their ACC opener against Clemson. They ended 2025 with a loss against eighteenth-ranked Notre Dame. A loss to Wake Forest and a victory over Boston College left the team at 8–9. The three-point victory over Boston College would prove to be the team's last of the season. The Panthers lost the next fourteen straight games. They played three ranked teams over this stretch: tenth-ranked Louisville, twenty-first ranked Duke and twenty-second ranked North Carolina. The closest losses over the stretch were a four-point loss at home to Florida State and a pair of seven-point losses to SMU.

The Panthers finished the season 8–23 overall and 1–17 in ACC play to finish in a tie for seventeenth place. They did not qualify for the ACC tournament. They were not invited to the NCAA tournament or the WBIT. On March 3, Verdi was fired as head coach.

== Previous season ==
The Panthers finished the season 13–19 overall and 5–13 in ACC play to finish in fifteenth place. As the fifteenth seed in the ACC tournament, they lost their first-round matchup with tenth-seeded Virginia. They were not invited to the NCAA tournament or the WBIT.

== Off-season ==
=== Departures ===
Departures
Name	Number	Pos.	Height	Year	Hometown	Reason for departure
Brooklyn Miles	0	G	5'5"	Senior	Frankfort, Kentucky	Graduated
Aaryn Battle	1	G	5'10"	Sophomore	Sewell, New Jersey	Transferred to Hampton
MaKayla Elmore	3	F	6'3"	Senior	Fostoria, Ohio	Graduated
Kiara Williams	5	F	6'0"	Freshman	Palm Bay, Florida	Transferred to La Salle
Bella Perkins	10	G	5'9"	Senior	Chantilly, Virginia	Graduated
Marley Washenitz	11	G	5'7"	Junior	Fairmont, West Virginia	Transferred to Arizona State
Raeven Boswell	14	G	5'11"	Junior	Austin, Texas	—
Khadija Faye	15	C	6'4"	Graduate student	Dakar, Senegal	Graduated
Aislin Malcolm	20	G	5'10"	Junior	Carnegie, Pennsylvania	Transferred to Robert Morris

=== Incoming transfers ===
Incoming transfers
Name	Number	Pos.	Height	Year	Hometown	Previous school
Carla Viegas	8	G	5'9"	Junior	Málaga, Spain	Florida State
Angel Jones	11	G	5'4"	Senior	Woodbridge, Virginia	Coppin State
Fatima Diakhate	21	F	6'5"	(redshirt) Junior	Dakar, Senegal	Georgia

=== Recruiting class ===
College recruiting
Name	Hometown	School	Height	Weight	Commit date
Macie Arzner; G	McMinnville, Oregon	McMinnville	5 ft 11 in (1.80 m)	N/A	
Macie Arzner; G	Recruit ratings: ESPN: (NR)				
Theresa Hagans Jr. G	Utica, New York	Bishop Ireton	5 ft 9 in (1.75 m)	N/A	
Theresa Hagans Jr. G	Recruit ratings: ESPN: (91)				
Megan Hollingsworth; G	Ottawa, Canada	Acapital Courts Academy	6 ft 0 in (1.83 m)	N/A	
Megan Hollingsworth; G	Recruit ratings: ESPN: (NR)				
Angela Le Faou; F	Bordeaux, France	Tony Parker Adequat Academy	6 ft 5 in (1.96 m)	N/A	
Angela Le Faou; F	Recruit ratings: ESPN: (NR)				
Divine Tumba Tshibuabua; F	Longueuil, Canada	Royal Crown Academy	6 ft 2 in (1.88 m)	N/A	
Divine Tumba Tshibuabua; F	Recruit ratings: ESPN: (NR)				
Jayda Queeley; G	Edmonton, Canada	Royal Crown Academy	5 ft 10 in (1.78 m)	N/A	
Jayda Queeley; G	Recruit ratings: ESPN: (NR)				
Nylah Wilson; G	Chester, Virginia	IMG Academy	5 ft 9 in (1.75 m)	N/A	
Nylah Wilson; G	Recruit ratings: ESPN: (96)				
Overall recruit ranking:
Note: In many cases, Scout, Rivals, 247Sports, On3, and ESPN may conflict in their listings of height and weight.; In these cases, the average was taken. ESPN grades are on a 100-point scale.; Sources:

== Roster ==
2025–26 Pittsburgh Panthers women's basketball team
Players
Coaches

Pos.	#	Name	Height	Year	Previous school	Hometown
F	0	Divine Tumba Tshibabua	6 ft 2 in (1.88 m)	Fr	Royal Crown Academy	Longueuil, Canada
G	1	Theresa Hagans	5 ft 9 in (1.75 m)	Fr	Bishop Ireton	Utica, NY
G	2	Amiya Jenkins	5 ft 10 in (1.78 m)	RS Jr	Anderson County; Kentucky	Lexington, KY
G	3	Nylah Wilson	5 ft 9 in (1.75 m)	Fr	IMG Academy	Chester, VA
G	5	Jayda Queeley	5 ft 10 in (1.78 m)	Fr	Royal Crown Academy	Edmonton, Canada
G	8	Carla Viegas	5 ft 9 in (1.75 m)	Jr	CAB Estepona; Florida State	Málaga, Spain
F	10	Anglea Le Faou	6 ft 5 in (1.96 m)	Fr	Tony Parker Adequat Academy	Bordeaux, France
G	11	Angel Jones	5 ft 4 in (1.63 m)	Sr	Forest Park; Coppin State	Woodbridge, VA
F	13	Lauren Rust	6 ft 0 in (1.83 m)	RS So	The Webb School	Victoria, Canada
G	15	Megan Hollingsworth	6 ft 0 in (1.83 m)	Fr	Capital Courts Academy	Ottawa, Canada
C	21	Fatima Diakhate	6 ft 5 in (1.96 m)	RS Jr	Montverde Academy; Georgia	Dakar, Senegal
G	22	Audrey Biggs	6 ft 0 in (1.83 m)	So	Boyd County	Catlettsburg, KY
G	23	Mikayla Johnson	6 ft 1 in (1.85 m)	RS Jr	Bartlett; Colorado	Anchorage, AK
G	44	Macie Arzner	5 ft 11 in (1.8 m)	Fr	McMinnville	McMinnville, OR

Head coach

- Tory Verdi (Keene State)

Assistant coach(es)

- Candice Finley (Eastern Kentucky)
- Anthony Brammer (Old Dominion)
- Devan Newman (Louisville)
- Abby Anderson (St. Francis)

Legend

- (C) Team captain
- (S) Suspended
- (I) Ineligible
- (W) Walk-on
- Injured
- Current redshirt

Roster
Last update: October 7, 2025

== Schedule ==
Date time, TV	Rank^{#}	Opponent^{#}	Result	Record	High points	High rebounds	High assists	Site (attendance) city, state
Exhibition
October 26, 2025*; 1:00 p.m.		Pitt–Johnstown	W 101–46	–	17 – Viegas	9 – Hollingsworth	4 – Wilson	Petersen Events Center; Pittsburgh, PA
October 30, 2025*; 6:00 p.m.		Lock Haven	W 98–58	–	23 – Jones	15 – Johnson	5 – Queeley	Petersen Events Center; Pittsburgh, PA
Regular season
November 4, 2025*; 6:00 p.m., ACCNX		Drexel	L 60–68	0–1	19 – Johnson	8 – Diakhate	3 – Queeley	Petersen Events Center (638); Pittsburgh, PA
November 8, 2025*; 1:00 p.m., ACCNX		Mount St. Mary's	W 66–52	1–1	14 – Diakhate	11 – Diakhate	8 – Queeley	Petersen Events Center (708); Pittsburgh, PA
November 11, 2025*; 6:00 p.m., ACCNX		Cornell	W 56–54	2–1	20 – Diakhate	12 – Diakhate	3 – Tied	Petersen Events Center (627); Pittsburgh, PA
November 16, 2025*; 1:00 p.m., ACCNX		Scranton	L 63–69	2–2	17 – Diakhate	13 – Rust	5 – Queeley	Petersen Events Center (638); Pittsburgh, PA
November 18, 2025*; 6:00 p.m., ACCNX		Le Moyne	W 87–65	3–2	17 – Hagans Jr.	10 – Diakhate	8 – Hagans Jr.	Petersen Events Center (592); Pittsburgh, PA
November 22, 2025*; 1:00 p.m., ACCNX		Robert Morris	W 63–54	4–2	20 – Johnson	11 – Rust	6 – Hagans Jr.	Petersen Events Center (839); Pittsburgh, PA
November 25, 2025*; 6:00 p.m., ACCNX		Lafayette	L 59–76	4–3	16 – Hagans Jr.	9 – Diakhate	6 – Jones	Petersen Events Center (529); Pittsburgh, PA
November 28, 2025*; 1:15 p.m., AWSN		vs. Ball State; Florida Gulf Coast Classic	L 41–55	4–4	11 – Jenkins	13 – Rust	1 – Tied	Alico Arena (300); Fort Myers, FL
November 29, 2025*; 11:00 a.m., AWSN		vs. Chicago State; Florida Gulf Coast Classic	W 67–53	5–4	17 – Johnson	14 – Diakhate	3 – Hagans Jr.	Alico Arena (137); Fort Myers, FL
December 1, 2025*; 6:00 p.m., ACCNX		Central Connecticut	W 68–43	6–4	17 – Tied	8 – Diakhate	5 – Tied	Petersen Events Center (552); Pittsburgh, PA
December 4, 2025*; 7:00 p.m., SECN		at Mississippi State; ACC–SEC Challenge	L 44–79	6–5	15 – Viegas	5 – Johnson	2 – Tied	Humphrey Coliseum (3,433); Starkville, MS
December 14, 2026; 2:00 p.m., ACCNX		at Clemson	L 41–73	6–6 (0–1)	23 – Hagans Jr.	6 – Hollingsworth	2 – Tied	Littlejohn Coliseum (1,060); Clemson, SC
December 18, 2025*; 6:00 p.m., ACCNX		Saint Francis	W 98–46	7–6	14 – Tied	11 – Diakhate	4 – Queeley	Petersen Events Center (541); Pittsburgh, PA
December 21, 2025*; 1:00 p.m., ESPN+		at Duquesne	L 69–84	7–7	23 – Johnson	8 – Rust	4 – Hagans Jr.	UPMC Cooper Fieldhouse (2,221); Pittsburgh, PA
December 29, 2025; 7:00 p.m., ACCN		at No. 18 Notre Dame	L 59–94	7–8 (0–2)	22 – Johnson	16 – Diakhate	5 – Hagans Jr.	Purcell Pavilion (7,879); Notre Dame, IN
January 1, 2026; 6:00 p.m., ACCNX		Wake Forest	L 55–74	7–9 (0–3)	17 – Rust	11 – Diakhate	8 – Hagans Jr.	Petersen Events Center (721); Pittsburgh, PA
January 4, 2026; 6:00 p.m., ACCN		at Boston College	W 64–61	8–9 (1–3)	24 – Hagans Jr.	15 – Rust	5 – Hagans Jr.	Conte Forum (623); Chestnut Hill, MA
January 11, 2026; 2:00 p.m., The CW		at No. 10 Louisville	L 46–86	8–10 (1–4)	14 – Hagans Jr.	8 – Rust	2 – Tied	KFC Yum! Center (8,220); Louisville, KY
January 15, 2026; 6:00 p.m., ACCNX		Florida State	L 65–69	8–11 (1–5)	19 – Johnson	16 – Diakhate	3 – Tied	Petersen Events Center (743); Pittsburgh, PA
January 18, 2026; 1:00 p.m., ACCNX		SMU	L 76–83	8–12 (1–6)	20 – Johnson	15 – Diakhate	5 – Hagans Jr.	Petersen Events Center (746); Pittsburgh, PA
January 22, 2026; 7:00 p.m., ACCNX		at Virginia	L 46–84	8–13 (1–7)	13 – Hagans Jr.	7 – Tied	5 – Hagans Jr.	John Paul Jones Arena (3,755); Charlottesville, VA
January 24, 2026; 4:00 p.m., ACCNX		No. 21 Duke	L 41–95	8–14 (1–8)	15 – Johnson	6 – Diakhate	1 – Tied	Petersen Events Center (1,233); Pittsburgh, PA
January 29, 2026; 6:00 p.m., ACCNX		at Virginia Tech	L 50–67	8–15 (1–9)	21 – Johnson	9 – Diakhate	4 – Tied	Cassell Coliseum (4,051); Blacksburg, VA
February 5, 2026; 6:00 p.m., ACCNX		Stanford	L 65–86	8–16 (1–10)	21 – Hagans Jr.	6 – Tied	4 – Hagans Jr.	Petersen Events Center (571); Pittsburgh, PA
February 8, 2026; 1:00 p.m., ACCNX		California	L 80–95	8–17 (1–11)	19 – Hagans Jr.	9 – Diakhate	5 – Hagans Jr.	Petersen Events Center (1,113); Pittsburgh, PA
February 12, 2026; 6:00 p.m., ACCNX		Syracuse	L 51–84	8–18 (1–12)	13 – Hagans Jr.	8 – Johnson	5 – Hagans Jr.	Petersen Events Center (722); Pittsburgh, PA
February 15, 2026; 12:00 p.m., ACCN		at SMU	L 76–83	8–19 (1–13)	33 – Hagans Jr.	10 – Johnson	6 – Hagans Jr.	Moody Coliseum (1,331); University Park, TX
February 19, 2026; 6:00 p.m., ACCNX		Georgia Tech	L 68–84	8–20 (1–14)	19 – Hagans Jr.	14 – Diakhate	5 – Hagans Jr.	Petersen Events Center (658); Pittsburgh, PA
February 22, 2026; 12:00 p.m., ACCN		at No. 22 North Carolina	L 50–78	8–21 (1–15)	19 – Hagans Jr.	8 – Hagans Jr.	4 – Queeley	Carmichael Arena (5,246); Chapel Hill, NC
February 26, 2026; 7:00 p.m., ACCNX		at Miami (FL)	L 58–79	8–22 (1–16)	27 – Viegas	14 – Diakhate	4 – Queeley	Watsco Center (839); Coral Gables, FL
March 1, 2026; 2:00 p.m., ACCN		NC State	L 43–93	8–23 (1–17)	9 – Tied	13 – Diakhate	3 – Tied	Petersen Events Center (1,369); Pittsburgh, PA
*Non-conference game. ^{#}Rankings from AP poll. (#) Tournament seedings in parentheses. All times are in Eastern.
