= 2025–26 California Golden Bears women's basketball team =

Intercollegiate basketball season

2025–26 California Golden Bears women's basketball

Raising the B.A.R Invitational champions

WBIT, Quarterfinals
- Conference: Atlantic Coast Conference
- Record: 21–15 (9–9 ACC)
- Head coach: Charmin Smith (7th season)
- Associate head coach: Heidi Heintz (4th season)
- Assistant coaches: Travon Bryant (3rd season); Jenny Huth (2nd season); Eliza Pierre (5th season)
- Home arena: Haas Pavilion

2025–26 ACC women's basketball standings
	Conf.				Overall
Team	W		L	PCT	W		L	PCT
No. 5 Duke †	16	–	2	.889	27	–	9	.750
No. 11 Louisville	15	–	3	.833	29	–	8	.784
No. 13 North Carolina	14	–	4	.778	28	–	8	.778
NC State	13	–	5	.722	21	–	11	.656
No. 9 Notre Dame	12	–	6	.667	25	–	10	.714
Virginia Tech	12	–	6	.667	23	–	10	.697
Syracuse	12	–	6	.667	24	–	9	.727
No. 19 Virginia	11	–	7	.611	22	–	12	.647
Clemson	11	–	7	.611	21	–	12	.636
California	9	–	9	.500	21	–	15	.583
Georgia Tech	8	–	10	.444	14	–	19	.424
Miami (FL)	8	–	10	.444	18	–	15	.545
Stanford	8	–	10	.444	21	–	14	.600
Florida State	5	–	13	.278	10	–	21	.323
Wake Forest	4	–	14	.222	14	–	18	.438
SMU	2	–	16	.111	9	–	21	.300
Pittsburgh	1	–	17	.056	8	–	23	.258
Boston College	1	–	17	.056	5	–	26	.161
† 2026 ACC tournament winner Rankings from AP Poll

The 2025–26 California Golden Bears women's basketball team represented the University of California, Berkeley during the 2025–26 NCAA Division I women's basketball season. The Golden Bears were led by seventh-year head coach Charmin Smith and played their home games at Haas Pavilion. They competed as second-year members of the Atlantic Coast Conference.

The Golden Bears began their season with a trip to Paris, France to participate in the Oui-Play event against nineteenth-ranked Vanderbilt. California lost the game 65–74. They won five straight games upon their return to Haas Pavilion, including both of their Raising the B.A.R Invitational games. They then traveled to Frisco, Texas to participate in the Hoopfest Basketball Women’s Challenge. There, they won their first game against Grand Canyon before losing against Auburn. They lost two straight games against SEC opponents as they were defeated by Missouri in the ACC–SEC Challenge 67–68. The Golden Bears went 3–5 over their next eight games, losing all four ACC games over the stretch. They also were defeated by nineteenth-ranked USC in the Invisalign Bay Area Women's Classic. Their ACC losses included one against rivals Stanford and sixteenth-ranked North Carolina. California rebounded by going 4–2 over their next six games. There losses were a triple overtime thriller against Syracuse and against seventh-ranked Louisville. Their wins included an overtime win over Stanford and an upset of Notre Dame. The Golden Bears won their next three straight games, two of which were on the road. Their fortunes soured slightly to end the season, as they finished 2–3 in their final five games. They defeated Florida State and SMU on the final day of the regular season.

The Golden Bears finished the season 21–15 overall and 9–9 in ACC play to finish in tenth place. As the tenth seed in the ACC tournament, they defeated Wake Forest 75–52 in the First Round. They lost to seventh seed Syracuse by eleven points in the Second Round. They received an at-large invitation to the NCAA tournament and were the eighth-seed in the Spokane 4 region. They lost to ninth seed Mississippi State 69–46 in the First Round to end their season.

== Previous season ==
The Golden Bears finished the season 25–9 overall and 12–6 in ACC play to finish in seventh place. As the seventh seed in the ACC tournament, earned a bye into the second round where they defeated Virginia 75–58. They lost to sixth ranked and second seed Notre Dame by nine points in the Quarterfinals. They received an at-large invitation to the WBIT and were the third seed in the Utah region. They defeated Santa Clara in the First Round and second seed Kansas State in the Second Round. They lost to fourth-seed Columbia 68–74 in the Quarterfinals to end their season.

== Offseason ==
=== Departures ===
California Departures
Name	Num.	Pos.	Height	Year	Hometown	Reason for departure
Michelle Onyiah	0	C	6'3"	Graduate Student	Eastvale, California	Graduated
Jayda Noble	2	G	5'11"	Graduate Student	Spokane, Washington	Graduated
Zahra King	3	G	5'10"	Freshman	Brooklyn, New York	Transferred to SMU
Kayla Williams	4	G	5'7"	Graduate Student	Los Angeles, California	Graduated
Marta Suárez	7	F	6'3"	(redshirt) Senior	Oviedo, Spain	Graduated; transferred to TCU
Kamryn Mafua	14	G/F	6'1"	Freshman	Folsom, California	Transferred to Utah
Ioanna Krimili	21	G	5'10"	Graduate Student	Heraklion, Greece	Graduated
Natalia Ackerman	35	F	6'1"	Graduate Student	Watsonville, California	Graduated

=== Incoming transfers ===
Incoming transfers
Name	Num	Pos.	Height	Year	Hometown	Previous School
Mjracle Sheppard	1	G	5'10"	Junior	Kent, Washington	LSU
Naya Ojukwu	13	F	6'1"	(redshirt) Sophomore	Meridian, Idaho	Morgan State
Sakima Walker	35	G	6'5"	Graduate Student	Columbus, Ohio	South Carolina

=== Recruiting ===
College recruiting
Name	Hometown	School	Height	Weight	Commit date
Taylor Barnes; F	Grand Prairie, Texas	South Grand Prairie High School	6 ft 0 in (1.83 m)	N/A	
Taylor Barnes; F	Recruit ratings: ESPN: (92)				
Isis Johnson-Musah; G	Detroit, Michigan	Detroit Edison Academy	5 ft 10 in (1.78 m)	N/A	
Isis Johnson-Musah; G	Recruit ratings: ESPN: (NR)				
Grace McCallop; G	Shawnee Mission, Kansas	Bishop Miege High School	5 ft 10 in (1.78 m)	N/A	
Grace McCallop; G	Recruit ratings: ESPN: (NR)				
Aliyahna Morris; G	Rancho Cucamonga, California	Etiwanda High School	5 ft 5 in (1.65 m)	N/A	
Aliyahna Morris; G	Recruit ratings: ESPN: (96)				
Overall recruit ranking:
Note: In many cases, Scout, Rivals, 247Sports, On3, and ESPN may conflict in their listings of height and weight.; In these cases, the average was taken. ESPN grades are on a 100-point scale.; Sources:

== Roster ==
2025–26 California Golden Bears women's basketball team
Players
Coaches

Pos.	#	Name	Height	Year	Previous school	Hometown
G	1	Mjracle Sheppard	5 ft 10 in (1.78 m)	Jr	Montverde Academy; LSU	Kent, WA
F	3	Taylor Barnes	6 ft 0 in (1.83 m)	Fr	South Grand Prairie	Grand Prairie, TX
G	5	Lola Donez	5 ft 11 in (1.8 m)	So	Lahainaluna	Lahaina, HI
G	6	Isis Johnson-Musah	5 ft 10 in (1.78 m)	Fr	Detroit Edison Academy	Detroit, MI
F	7	Naya Ojukwu	6 ft 1 in (1.85 m)	RS So	Mountain View; Morgan State	Meridian, ID
G	10	Lulu Twidale	5 ft 10 in (1.78 m)	Jr	South West Metro Pirates	Sunshine Coast, Australia
G	12	Grace McCallop	5 ft 10 in (1.78 m)	Fr	Bishop Miege	Shawnee Mission, KS
G	21	Gisella Maul	5 ft 11 in (1.8 m)	Jr	Cedar Park; Texas	Cedar Park, TX
F	22	Claudia Langarita	6 ft 4 in (1.93 m)	GS	INS Joaquim Blume; San Francisco	Barcelona, Spain
G	23	Anastasia Drosouni	5 ft 11 in (1.8 m)	Jr	Expaideftiria Fryganiotis	Thessaloniki, Greece
G	25	Aliyahna Morris	5 ft 5 in (1.65 m)	Fr	Etiwanda	Rancho Cucamonga, CA
C	35	Sakima Walker	6 ft 5 in (1.96 m)	GS	Columbus Africentric Early College; South Carolina	Columbus, OH
G	42	Sofia Bowes	5 ft 10 in (1.78 m)	So	San Ramon Valley	San Ramon, CA

Head coach

- Charmin Smith (Stanford)

Assistant coach(es)

- Heidi Heintz (UC Davis)
- Travon Bryant (Missouri)
- Jenny Huth (Colorado)
- Eliza Pierre (California)

Legend

- (C) Team captain
- (S) Suspended
- (I) Ineligible
- (W) Walk-on
- Injured
- Current redshirt

Roster
Last update: September 19, 2025

== Schedule and results ==
Date time, TV	Rank^{#}	Opponent^{#}	Result	Record	High points	High rebounds	High assists	Site (attendance) city, state
Exhibition
October 28, 2025*; 7:00 p.m.		Westmont						Haas Pavilion; Berkeley, CA
Regular season
November 3, 2025*; 11:30 a.m., ESPNU		vs. No. 19 Vanderbilt; Oui-Play	L 65–74	0–1	17 – Barnes	11 – Walker	5 – Barnes	Adidas Arena (5,712); Paris, France
November 9, 2025*; 7:00 p.m., ACCNX		Sacramento State	W 69–52	1–1	16 – Sheppard	7 – Sheppard	6 – Sheppard	Haas Pavilion (1,323); Berkeley, CA
November 11, 2025*; 7:00 p.m., ACCNX		Pacific	W 60–52	2–1	19 – Twidale	8 – Tied	3 – Twidale	Haas Pavilion (1,070); Berkeley, CA
November 15, 2025*; 3:00 p.m., ACCNX		Charlotte; Raising the B.A.R Invitational semifinal	W 69–44	3–1	17 – Morris	9 – Walker	6 – Morris	Haas Pavilion (137); Berkeley, CA
November 16, 2025*; 7:00 p.m., ACCNX		Harvard; Raising the B.A.R Invitational championship game	W 76–65	4–1	17 – Twidale	9 – Maul	5 – Morris	Haas Pavilion (1,019); Berkeley, CA
November 20, 2025*; 11:30 a.m., ACCNX		Saint Mary's	W 70–62	5–1	25 – Walker	9 – Walker	11 – Morris	Haas Pavilion (4,624); Berkeley, CA
November 24, 2025*; 5:00 p.m., FloHoops		vs. Grand Canyon; Hoopfest Basketball Women’s Challenge	W 68–63	6–1	15 – Sheppard	9 – Ojukwu	5 – Twidale	Comerica Center (271); Frisco, TX
November 26, 2025*; 4:30 p.m., FloHoops		vs. Auburn; Hoopfest Basketball Women’s Challenge	L 50–58	6–2	18 – Twidale	9 – Barnes	4 – Sheppard	Comerica Center (162); Frisco, TX
December 4, 2025*; 6:00 p.m., SECN		at Missouri; ACC–SEC Challenge	L 67–68	6–3	16 – Sheppard	11 – Maul	4 – Tied	Mizzou Arena (2,892); Columbia, MO
December 7, 2025*; 2:00 p.m., ACCNX		San Jose State	W 92–42	7–3	20 – Twidale	11 – Walker	4 – Tied	Haas Pavilion (1,150); Berkeley, CA
December 10, 2025*; 7:00 p.m., ACCNX		Idaho	W 68–61	8–3	15 – Maul	5 – Tied	5 – Walker	Haas Pavilion (903); Berkeley, CA
December 14, 2025; 1:00 p.m., ACCNX		at Stanford; Rivalry	L 69–78	8–4 (0–1)	16 – Barnes	10 – Maul	4 – Morris	Maples Pavilion (2,957); Stanford, CA
December 21, 2025*; 5:30 p.m., ESPN2		vs. No. 19 USC; Invisalign Bay Area Women's Classic	L 57–61	8–5	13 – Walker	10 – Walker	3 – Morris	Chase Center (6,258); San Francisco, CA
December 28, 2025*; 2:00 p.m., ACCNX		Cal Poly	W 91–50	9–5	19 – Twidale	8 – Walker	6 – Tied	Haas Pavilion (1,596); Berkeley, CA
January 1, 2026; 9:00 a.m., ACCN		at No. 16 North Carolina	L 55–71	9–6 (0–2)	19 – Walker	8 – Walker	5 – Twidale	Carmichael Arena (3,036); Chapel Hill, NC
January 4, 2026; 11:00 a.m., The CW		at NC State	L 60–71	9–7 (0–3)	16 – Twidale	13 – Maul	5 – Sheppard	Reynolds Coliseum (5,113); Raleigh, NC
January 8, 2026; 7:00 p.m., ACCN		Duke	L 74–78	9–8 (0–4)	18 – Walker	10 – Tied	6 – Sheppard	Haas Pavilion (985); Berkeley, CA
January 11, 2026; 2:00 p.m., ACCNX		Wake Forest	W 61–52	10–8 (1–4)	17 – Walker	10 – Sheppard	5 – Twidale	Haas Pavilion (1,652); Berkeley, CA
January 15, 2026; 3:00 p.m., ACCNX		at Syracuse	L 87–90 ^{3OT}	10–9 (1–5)	25 – Ojukwu	11 – Barnes	12 – Twidale	JMA Wireless Dome (2,312); Syracuse, NY
January 18, 2026; 9:00 a.m., ACCNX		at Boston College	W 73–58	11–9 (2–5)	36 – Twidale	9 – Maul	9 – Twidale	Conte Forum (867); Chestnut Hill, MA
January 25, 2026; 3:00 p.m., ACCN		Stanford; Rivalry	W 78–71 ^{OT}	12–9 (3–5)	24 – Twidale	8 – Maul	4 – Sheppard	Haas Pavilion (4,519); Berkeley, CA
January 29, 2026; 7:00 p.m., ACCNX		Notre Dame	W 80–69	13–9 (4–5)	19 – Twidale	9 – Walker	10 – Sheppard	Haas Pavilion (2,357); Berkeley, CA
February 1, 2026; 11:00 a.m., The CW		No. 7 Louisville	L 59–71	13–10 (4–6)	19 – Maul	11 – Walker	2 – Tied	Haas Pavilion (2,303); Berkeley, CA
February 5, 2026; 4:00 p.m., ACCNX		at Georgia Tech	W 63–56	14–10 (5–6)	17 – Maul	13 – Maul	5 – Tied	McCamish Pavilion (1,569); Atlanta, GA
February 8, 2026; 10:00 a.m., ACCNX		at Pittsburgh	W 95–80	15–10 (6–6)	32 – Twidale	11 – Maul	8 – Sheppard	Petersen Events Center (1,113); Pittsburgh, PA
February 12, 2026; 7:00 p.m., ACCNX		Virginia	W 64–58	16–10 (7–6)	20 – Walker	10 – Walker	3 – Tied	Haas Pavilion (1,310); Berkeley, CA
February 15, 2026; 2:00 p.m., ACCNX		Virginia Tech	L 58–68	16–11 (7–7)	15 – Morris	7 – Sheppard	4 – Twidale	Haas Pavilion (2,444); Berkeley, CA
February 19, 2026; 3:00 p.m., ACCNX		at Florida State	W 75–62	17–11 (8–7)	30 – Twidale	11 – Walker	6 – Tied	Donald L. Tucker Center (1,605); Tallahassee, FL
February 22, 2026; 11:00 a.m., ACCNX		at Miami (FL)	L 60–69	17–12 (8–8)	18 – Twidale	9 – Maul	5 – Maul	Kaseya Center (832); Coral Gables, FL
February 26, 2026; 7:00 p.m., ACCNX		Clemson	L 63–70	17–13 (8–9)	23 – Twidale	8 – Maul	4 – Sheppard	Haas Pavilion (2,811); Berkeley, CA
March 1, 2026; 2:00 p.m., ACCNX		SMU	W 78–34	18–13 (9–9)	25 – Twidale	8 – Maul	4 – Sheppard	Haas Pavilion (3,025); Berkeley, CA
ACC Women's Tournament
March 4, 2026*; 10:30 a.m., ACCN	(10)	vs. (15) Wake Forest; First Round	W 75–52	19–13	17 – Walker	10 – Walker	4 – Maul	Gas South Arena (5,192); Duluth, GA
March 5, 2026*; 2:00 p.m., ACCN	(10)	vs. (7) Syracuse; Second Round	L 59–70	19–14	19 – Walker	8 – Maul	3 – Tied	Gas South Arena (5,290); Duluth, GA
WBIT
March 19, 2026*; 7:00 p.m., ESPN+	(3)	Santa Clara; First Round	W 72–68	20–14	27 – Twidale	11 – Twidale	4 – Tied	Haas Pavilion (665); Berkeley, CA
March 22, 2026*; 4:00 p.m., ESPN+	(3)	at (2) Kansas State; Second Round	W 83–75	21–14	28 – Walker	16 – Walker	5 – Twidale	Bramlage Coliseum (2,625); Manhattan, KS
March 26, 2026*; 7:00 p.m., ESPN+	(3)	(4) Columbia; Quarterfinals	L 68–74	21–15	15 – Tied	5 – Tied	4 – Tied	Haas Pavilion (1,113); Berkeley, CA
*Non-conference game. ^{#}Rankings from AP Poll. (#) Tournament seedings in parentheses. All times are in Pacific Time.

== Rankings ==
Ranking movements Legend: ██ Increase in ranking ██ Decrease in ranking — = Not ranked RV = Received votes
	Week																				
Poll	Pre	1	2	3	4	5	6	7	8	9	10	11	12	13	14	15	16	17	18	19	Final
AP	—	—	—	—	—	—	—	—	—	—	—	—	—	—	—	—	—	—	—	—	—
Coaches	RV	—	—	—	—	—	—	—	—	—	—	—	—	—	—	—	—	—	—	—	—
