= 2025–26 Georgia Tech Yellow Jackets women's basketball team =

Intercollegiate basketball season

2025–26 Georgia Tech Yellow Jackets women's basketball

WBIT, First Round
- Conference: Atlantic Coast Conference
- Record: 14–19 (8–10 ACC)
- Head coach: Karen Blair (1st season)
- Associate head coach: Marsha Frese (1st season)
- Assistant coaches: Chris Meadows (1st season); Ben Kantor (1st season); Morgan Williams (1st season); Caleb Currier (3rd season)
- Home arena: McCamish Pavilion

2025–26 ACC women's basketball standings
	Conf.				Overall
Team	W		L	PCT	W		L	PCT
No. 5 Duke †	16	–	2	.889	27	–	9	.750
No. 11 Louisville	15	–	3	.833	29	–	8	.784
No. 13 North Carolina	14	–	4	.778	28	–	8	.778
NC State	13	–	5	.722	21	–	11	.656
No. 9 Notre Dame	12	–	6	.667	25	–	10	.714
Virginia Tech	12	–	6	.667	23	–	10	.697
Syracuse	12	–	6	.667	24	–	9	.727
No. 19 Virginia	11	–	7	.611	22	–	12	.647
Clemson	11	–	7	.611	21	–	12	.636
California	9	–	9	.500	21	–	15	.583
Georgia Tech	8	–	10	.444	14	–	19	.424
Miami (FL)	8	–	10	.444	18	–	15	.545
Stanford	8	–	10	.444	21	–	14	.600
Florida State	5	–	13	.278	10	–	21	.323
Wake Forest	4	–	14	.222	14	–	18	.438
SMU	2	–	16	.111	9	–	21	.300
Pittsburgh	1	–	17	.056	8	–	23	.258
Boston College	1	–	17	.056	5	–	26	.161
† 2026 ACC tournament winner Rankings from AP Poll

The 2025–26 Georgia Tech Yellow Jackets women's basketball team represented the Georgia Institute of Technology during the 2025–26 NCAA Division I women's basketball season. They were led by first-year head coach Karen Blair and played their home games at McCamish Pavilion in Atlanta, Georgia as members of the Atlantic Coast Conference.

Blair entered the season after the retirement of sixth-year, head coach Nell Fortner. Blair's tenure started with the Yellow Jackets going 3–2 over their first five games with losses against Princeton and Jacksonville. Georgia Tech then lost its next four straight games. First, was a rivalry loss at Georgia. Then the Yellow Jackets lost both of their games in the Cayman Islands Classic. They also lost their ACC–SEC Challenge game at Texas A&M. They broke the streak with a victory over Norfolk State before losing their next three games. That streak included their first two ACC games of the season, against Wake Forest and NC State. They rebounded with three straight wins, including an overtime victory over eighteenth-ranked Notre Dame. The Yellow Jackets went 2–4 over their next six games, defeating Clemson and Florida State. The team improved slightly going 3–2 over their next five games. They lost against California, and in double-overtime in a rematch against Clemson. They went 1–2 in their final three regular season games, losing at Virginia Tech and against tenth-ranked Louisville. They won their final regular season game against Miami.

The Yellow Jackets finished the season 14–19 overall and 8–10 in ACC play to finish in a tie for eleventh place. As the eleventh seed in the ACC tournament, they defeated fourteenth seed Florida State in the First Round. They lost to sixth seed Virginia Tech for the second time in as many weeks in the Second Round. They received an at-large invitation to the WBIT and were an unseeded team in the North Dakota State second. They lost to second seed Kansas State in the First Round to end their season.

== Previous season ==
The Yellow Jackets finished the season 22–11 overall and 9–9 in ACC play to finish in a tie for tenth place. As the ninth seed in the ACC tournament, they defeated eighth seed Virginia Tech, avenging their loss to end their regular season winning streak, in the Second Round. They lost to first seed and seventh ranked NC State in the Quarterfinals. They received an at-large invitation to the NCAA tournament and were the ninth-seed in the Spokane 1 region. They lost to eighth seed Richmond in the First Round to end their season.

== Off-season ==
=== Departures ===
Departures
Name	Number	Pos.	Height	Year	Hometown	Reason for departure
Zoesha Smith	0	G/F	6'1"	Graduate Student	Brunswick, Georgia	Graduated
Chazadi Wright	1	G	5'4"	Freshman	Atlanta, Georgia	Transferred to Iowa
Dani Carnegie	3	G	5'9"	Freshman	Mount Vernon, New York	Transferred to Georgia
Tonie Morgan	5	G	5'9"	Junior	Tallahassee, Florida	Transferred to Kentucky
Kayla Blackshear	13	F	6'1"	Senior	Orlando, Florida	Graduated
Rusne Augustinaite	23	G	6'0"	Junior	Šiauliai, Lithuania	Transferred to Clemson
Kara Dunn	25	G	5'11"	Junior	Dallas, Georgia	Transferred to USC
Gabbie Grooms	27	G	5'9"	Freshman	Sharpsburg, Georgia	Transferred to Georgia State
Tianna Thompson	35	G	5'10"	Freshman	Mableton, Georgia	Transferred to Ole Miss

=== Incoming transfers ===
Incoming Transfers
Name	Number	Pos.	Height	Year	Hometown	Previous school
Brianna Turnage	0	G	6'1"	Senior	Atlanta, Georgia	Florida State
Erica Moon	3	G	5'6"	(redshirt) Sophomore	Atlanta, Georgia	Texas A&M
Catherine Alben	5	G	5'7"	Senior	Snellville, Georgia	Charleston Southern
Jada Crawshaw	12	F	6'0"	Junior	Darwin, Australia	Long Beach State
Déborah Mukeba	13	C	6'5"	Sophomore	Fleurus, Belgium	Boston College
Talayah Walker	21	G	5'10"	Sophomore	Odenton, Maryland	Penn State
La'Nya Foster	23	G	5'9"	Junior	Riverdale, Georgia	Austin Peay
Savannah Samuel	33	G	6'1"	Graduate Student	Woodstock, Georgia	Boston College

=== Recruiting class ===
College recruiting
Name	Hometown	School	Height	Weight	Commit date
McKayla Taylor; C	Atlanta, Georgia	Langston Hughes High School	6 ft 1 in (1.85 m)	N/A	
McKayla Taylor; C	Recruit ratings: ESPN: (NR)				
Leyre Urdiain; G	Zaragoza, Spain	Sansueña	5 ft 11 in (1.80 m)	N/A	
Leyre Urdiain; G	Recruit ratings: ESPN: (NR)				
Overall recruit ranking:
Note: In many cases, Scout, Rivals, 247Sports, On3, and ESPN may conflict in their listings of height and weight.; In these cases, the average was taken. ESPN grades are on a 100-point scale.; Sources:

== Roster ==
2025–26 Georgia Tech Yellow Jackets women's basketball team
Players
Coaches

Pos.	#	Name	Height	Year	Previous school	Hometown
G	0	Brianna Turnage	6 ft 1 in (1.85 m)	Sr	Westlake; Florida State	Atlanta, GA
C	1	McKayla Taylor	6 ft 1 in (1.85 m)	Fr	Langston Hughes	Atlanta, GA
G	3	Erica Moon	5 ft 6 in (1.68 m)	RS So	St. Francis; Texas A&M	Atlanta, GA
G	4	Leyre Urdiain	5 ft 11 in (1.8 m)	Fr	Sansueña	Zaragoza, Spain
G	5	Catherine Alben	5 ft 7 in (1.7 m)	Sr	Grayson; Charleston Southern	Snellville, GA
F	12	Jada Crawshaw	6 ft 0 in (1.83 m)	Jr	Sydney Comets; Long Beach State	Darwin, Australia
C	13	Déborah Mukeba	6 ft 5 in (1.96 m)		Winston-Salem Christian; Boston College	Fleurus, Belgium
C	20	Ariadna Termis	6 ft 6 in (1.98 m)	Jr	IES Joaquín Blume	Zaragoza, Spain
G	21	Talayah Walker	5 ft 10 in (1.78 m)	So	Our Lady of Good Counsel; Penn State	Odenton, MD
G	22	Inés Noguero Outeiral	5 ft 9 in (1.75 m)	Sr	IES Joaquín Blume	Gijón, Spain
G	23	La'Nya Foster	5 ft 9 in (1.75 m)	Jr	Lovejoy High School; Austin Peay	Riverdale, GA
G/F	32	D'Asia Thomas-Harris	6 ft 2 in (1.88 m)	Jr	Houston Christian	Katy, TX
G	33	Savannah Samuel	6 ft 1 in (1.85 m)	GS	St. Francis; Boston College	Woodstock, GA

Head coach

- Karen Blair (SMU)

Assistant coach(es)

- Marsha Frese (Rice)
- Chris Meadows (St. Bonaventure)
- Ben Kantor (Illinois)
- Morgan Williams (Georgetown)
- Caleb Currier (Tennessee)

Legend

- (C) Team captain
- (S) Suspended
- (I) Ineligible
- (W) Walk-on
- Injured
- Current redshirt

Roster
Last update: September 25, 2025

== Schedule ==
Date time, TV	Rank^{#}	Opponent^{#}	Result	Record	High points	High rebounds	High assists	Site (attendance) city, state
Regular Season
November 6, 2025*; 10:00 a.m., ACCNX		Radford	W 82–36	1–0	16 – Walker	11 – Turnage	6 – Moon	McCamish Pavilion (5,467); Atlanta, GA
November 9, 2025*; 2:00 p.m., ACCNX		Princeton	L 61–67	1–1	15 – Alben	10 – Turnage	5 – Termis	McCamish Pavilion (1,809); Atlanta, GA
November 13, 2025*; 7:00 p.m., ACCNX		Charleston Southern	W 87–40	2–1	19 – Walker	13 – Turnage	6 – Turnage	McCamish Pavilion (1,439); Atlanta, GA
November 16, 2025*; 3:00 p.m., ACCNX		Jacksonville	L 64–69	2–2	15 – Walker	10 – Noguero	4 – Termis	McCamish Pavilion (1,577); Atlanta, GA
November 19, 2025*; 7:00 p.m., ACCNX		West Georgia	W 68–60	3–2	15 – Samuel	11 – Turnage	5 – Turnage	McCamish Pavilion (1,628); Atlanta, GA
November 23, 2025*; 2:00 p.m., SECN+		at Georgia; Rivalry	L 59–87	3–3	12 – Tied	9 – Turnage	3 – Moon	Stegeman Coliseum (3,746); Athens, GA
November 28, 2025*; 5:00 p.m., FloHoops		vs. St. John's; Cayman Islands Classic	L 75–77	3–4	18 – Tied	6 – Alben	7 – Moon	John Gray Gymnasium (450); George Town, CI
November 29, 2025*; 5:00 p.m., FloHoops		vs. Florida; Cayman Islands Classic	L 56–65	3–5	14 – Samuel	10 – Samuel	3 – Termis	John Gray Gymnasium (313); George Town, CI
December 3, 2025*; 7:00 p.m., SECN		at Texas A&M; ACC–SEC Challenge	L 63–72	3–6	17 – Walker	10 – Thomas-Harris	5 – Alben	Reed Arena (3,626); College Station, TX
December 8, 2025*; 7:00 p.m., ACCNX		Norfolk State	W 72–57	4–6	20 – Tied	13 – Walker	5 – Tied	McCamish Pavilion (1,575); Atlanta, GA
December 11, 2025*; 7:00 p.m., ESPN+		at West Virginia	L 50–82	4–7	14 – Thomas-Harris	7 – Alben	3 – Tied	WVU Coliseum (2,935); Morgantown, WV
December 14, 2025; 2:00 p.m., ACCNX		at Wake Forest	L 56–57	4–8 (0–1)	13 – Walker	4 – Thomas-Harris	4 – Alben	LJVM Coliseum (1,220); Winston-Salem, NC
December 18, 2025; 7:00 p.m., ACCNX		at NC State	L 58–87	4–9 (0–2)	20 – Walker	8 – Foster	4 – Turnage	Reynolds Coliseum (4,432); Raleigh, NC
December 28, 2025*; 12:00 p.m., ACCN		Wofford	W 79–63	5–9	22 – Walker	17 – Turnage	9 – Moon	McCamish Pavilion (1,937); Atlanta, GA
January 1, 2026; 4:00 p.m., ACCN		No. 18 Notre Dame	W 95–90 ^{OT}	6–9 (1–2)	33 – Walker	13 – Turnage	10 – Turnage	McCamish Pavilion (3,759); Atlanta, GA
January 4, 2026; 2:00 p.m., ACCNX		at SMU	W 67–59	7–9 (2–2)	30 – Walker	11 – Walker	4 – Moon	Moody Coliseum (1,530); University Park, TX
January 8, 2026; 7:00 p.m., ACCNX		Virginia	L 59–61	7–10 (2–3)	21 – Walker	8 – Walker	3 – Tied	McCamish Pavilion (1,526); Atlanta, GA
January 11, 2026; 4:00 p.m., ACCN		Clemson	W 58–55	8–10 (3–3)	22 – Walker	18 – Turnage	7 – Moon	McCamish Pavilion (6,125); Atlanta, GA
January 18, 2026; 6:00 p.m., ACCN		at Duke	L 46–93	8–11 (3–4)	23 – Nelson	11 – Fournier	7 – Tied	Cameron Indoor Stadium (3,200); Durham, NC
January 22, 2026; 9:00 p.m., ACCN		North Carolina	L 46–54	8–12 (3–5)	14 – Walker	11 – Turnage	3 – Tied	McCamish Pavilion (1,933); Atlanta, GA
January 25, 2026; 4:00 p.m., ACCN		at Florida State	W 80–69	9–12 (4–5)	24 – Walker	18 – Turnage	3 – Tied	Donald L. Tucker Center (1,215); Tallahassee, FL
January 29, 2026; 6:00 p.m., ACCNX		at Syracuse	L 70–94	9–13 (4–6)	16 – Crawshaw	11 – Turnage	7 – Moon	JMA Wireless Dome (2,350); Syracuse, NY
February 1, 2026; 2:00 p.m., ACCN		Boston College	W 70–60	10–13 (5–6)	18 – Walker	15 – Turnage	5 – Termis	McCamish Pavilion (2,051); Atlanta, GA
February 5, 2026; 7:00 p.m., ACCNX		California	L 56–63	10–14 (5–7)	14 – Tied	13 – Turnage	5 – Turnage	McCamish Pavilion (1,569); Atlanta, GA
February 8, 2026; 2:00 p.m., ACCNX		Stanford	W 74–52	11–14 (6–7)	25 – Foster	12 – Turnage	7 – Turnage	McCamish Pavilion (3,056); Atlanta, GA
February 12, 2026; 8:00 p.m., ACCN		at Clemson	L 65–67 ^{2OT}	11–15 (6–8)	20 – Moon	20 – Turnage	4 – Alben	Littlejohn Coliseum (915); Clemson, SC
February 19, 2026; 6:00 p.m., ACCNX		at Pittsburgh	W 84–68	12–15 (7–8)	20 – Tied	21 – Turnage	7 – Termis	Petersen Events Center (658); Pittsburgh, PA
February 22, 2026; 2:00 p.m., ACCNX		at Virginia Tech	L 51–62	12–16 (7–9)	17 – Walker	15 – Turnage	4 – Termis	Cassell Coliseum (4,803); Blacksburg, VA
February 26, 2026; 7:00 p.m., ACCN		No. 10 Louisville	L 50–69	12–17 (7–10)	20 – Walker	10 – Turnage	4 – Foster	McCamish Pavilion (2,188); Atlanta, GA
March 1, 2026; 2:00 p.m., ACCNX		Miami (FL)	W 79–49	13–17 (8–10)	33 – Walker	11 – Turnage	8 – Turnage	McCamish Pavilion (3,480); Atlanta, GA
ACC Women's Tournament
March 4, 2026*; 4:00 p.m., ACCN	(11)	vs. (14) Florida State; First Round	W 72–60	14–17	18 – Foster	9 – Turnage	3 – Walker	Gas South Arena (5,192); Duluth, GA
March 5, 2026*; 7:30 p.m., ACCN	(11)	vs. (6) Virginia Tech; Second Round	L 54–62	14–18	20 – Walker	10 – Turnage	3 – Alben	Gas South Arena (5,290); Duluth, GA
WBIT
March 19, 2026*; 7:30 p.m., ESPN+		at (2) Kansas State; First Round	L 65–69	14–19	29 – Walker	13 – Turnage	3 – Turnage	Bramlage Coliseum (2,985); Manhattan, KS
*Non-conference game. ^{#}Rankings from AP Poll. (#) Tournament seedings in parentheses. All times are in Eastern Time.
