= 2025–26 Florida State Seminoles women's basketball team =

Intercollegiate basketball season

2025–26 Florida State Seminoles women's basketball
- Conference: Atlantic Coast Conference
- Record: 10–21 (5–13 ACC)
- Head coach: Brooke Wyckoff (5th season)
- Associate head coach: Bill Ferrara (4th season)
- Assistant coaches: Morgan Toles (6th season); Desma Thomas Bateast (3rd season); Adam Surguine (6th season)
- Home arena: Donald L. Tucker Center (Capacity: 12,100)

2025–26 ACC women's basketball standings
	Conf.				Overall
Team	W		L	PCT	W		L	PCT
No. 5 Duke †	16	–	2	.889	27	–	9	.750
No. 11 Louisville	15	–	3	.833	29	–	8	.784
No. 13 North Carolina	14	–	4	.778	28	–	8	.778
NC State	13	–	5	.722	21	–	11	.656
No. 9 Notre Dame	12	–	6	.667	25	–	10	.714
Virginia Tech	12	–	6	.667	23	–	10	.697
Syracuse	12	–	6	.667	24	–	9	.727
No. 19 Virginia	11	–	7	.611	22	–	12	.647
Clemson	11	–	7	.611	21	–	12	.636
California	9	–	9	.500	21	–	15	.583
Georgia Tech	8	–	10	.444	14	–	19	.424
Miami (FL)	8	–	10	.444	18	–	15	.545
Stanford	8	–	10	.444	21	–	14	.600
Florida State	5	–	13	.278	10	–	21	.323
Wake Forest	4	–	14	.222	14	–	18	.438
SMU	2	–	16	.111	9	–	21	.300
Pittsburgh	1	–	17	.056	8	–	23	.258
Boston College	1	–	17	.056	5	–	26	.161
† 2026 ACC tournament winner Rankings from AP Poll

The 2025–26 Florida State Seminoles women's basketball team represented Florida State University during the 2025–26 NCAA Division I women's basketball season. They were led by fifth-year head coach Brooke Wyckoff, who had previously served as interim head coach for the team during the 2020–21 season. The Seminoles played their home games at the Donald L. Tucker Center on the university's Tallahassee, Florida campus. They competed as members of the Atlantic Coast Conference (ACC).

The Seminoles began the season with two non-conference victories before travelling to Connecticut to face top-ranked UConn. The Seminoles lost 67–99, but rebounded with a victory over Nicholls State. They lost their next three games, including a rivalry game at Florida. They then went to Fort Myers, Florida to participate in the Coconut Hoops Great Egret Division. They won their first game, but lost the second, against ninth-ranked Oklahoma. They returned home and lost their ACC–SEC Challenge game against Georgia. Their losing streak exteded to five games as they lost their ACC opener against eighteenth-ranked Notre Dame, and another ACC game against Virginia Tech. They broke the streak against South Carolina State. Their overall fortune did not improve, as they lost four of their next five ACC games, including a rivalry game against Miami. Their lone victory over the stretch was at Pittsburgh. The Seminoles went 3–3 over their next six games with defeats of SMU, Miami, and Boston College. They could not keep that momentum, as they lost four of their final five regular season games. They lost to ninth-ranked Louisville and twelfth-ranked Duke over the stretch. They won their final game of the regular season over Wake Forest 77–74, in overtime.

The Seminoles finished the season 10–21 overall and 5–13 in ACC play to finish in fourteenth place. As the fourteenth seed in the 2026 ACC tournament, they lost to eleventh seed Georgia Tech in the first round. Florida State was not invited to the NCAA or WBIT or WNIT. This was the first season without post-season play for the Seminoles since 2012, with the exception of 2020, when the post-season was cancelled.

== Previous season ==
The Seminoles finished the regular season 23–7 overall and 13–5 in ACC play to finish in a three-way tie for fourth place. As the fourth seed in the ACC tournament, they earned a bye into the quarterfinals, where they lost to fifth seed and fourteenth-ranked North Carolina. They received an at-large invitation to the NCAA tournament and were the six-seed in the Spokane 1 region. They defeated eleven-seed George Mason in the first round before losing to three-seed and tenth-ranked LSU, 101–71, to end their season. They finished with an overall record of 24–9. Their 24 wins were the most in Brooke Wyckoff's tenure. Ta'Niya Latson was the nation's leading scorer during the season.

== Off-season ==
=== Departures ===
Departures
Name	Number	Pos.	Height	Year	Hometown	Reason for departure
Ta'Niya Latson	00	G	5'8"	Junior	Miami, Florida	Transferred to South Carolina
Brianna Turnage	1	G	6'1"	Junior	Atlanta, Georgia	Transferred to Georgia Tech
O'Mariah Gordon	3	G	5'4"	Senior	Bradenton, Florida	Graduated
Raianne Dias Dos Santos	4	G	5'9"	(redshirt) Sophomore	São Paulo, Brazil	Transferred to Virginia
Mariana Valenzuela	5	F	6'2"	(redshirt) Sophomore	Mazatlán, Mexico	Transferred to Seton Hall
Morelia Chavez	8	F	6'1"	Junior	Morelia, Mexico	Transferred to Fresno State
Carla Viegas	13	G	5'9"	Sophomore	Málaga, Spain	Transferred to Pittsburgh
Makayla Timpson	21	F	6'2"	Senior	Edison, Georgia	Graduated; drafted 19th overall in the 2025 WNBA draft
Malea Williams	22	F	6'4"	Graduate student	Georgetown, Kentucky	Graduated

=== Incoming transfers ===
Incoming transfers
Name	Number	Pos.	Height	Year	Hometown	Previous school
Allie Kubek	0	F	6'2"	Graduate student	Elkton, Maryland	Maryland
Jasmine Shavers	3	G	5'8"	Senior	Mesquite, Texas	Texas Tech
Emma Risch	12	G	6'1"	Junior	Melbourne, Florida	Notre Dame
Tatum Greene	13	G	6'3"	Sophomore	Baltimore, Maryland	Boston College
Solé Williams	15	G	5'9"	Sophomore	Cincinnati, Ohio	Texas Tech
Pania Davis	24	C	6'6"	Junior	Perth, Australia	New Mexico Junior College

=== Recruiting class ===
College recruiting
Name	Hometown	School	Height	Weight	Commit date
Kamariah Gerton; G	Cincinnati, Ohio	Princeton High School	5 ft 7 in (1.70 m)	N/A	
Kamariah Gerton; G	Recruit ratings: ESPN: (91)				
Overall recruit ranking:
Note: In many cases, Scout, Rivals, 247Sports, On3, and ESPN may conflict in their listings of height and weight.; In these cases, the average was taken. ESPN grades are on a 100-point scale.; Sources:

== Roster ==
2025–26 Florida State Seminoles women's basketball team
Players
Coaches

Pos.	#	Name	Height	Year	Previous school	Hometown
F	0	Allie Kubek	6 ft 2 in (1.88 m)	GS	Sanford School; Maryland	Elkton, MD
G	1	Mari Gerton	5 ft 8 in (1.73 m)	Fr	Princeton	Cincinnati, OH
G	2	Amaya Bonner	6 ft 0 in (1.83 m)	Sr	Bishop O'Dowd; California	Fremont, CA
G	3	Jasmine Shavers	5 ft 8 in (1.73 m)	Sr	Dr. John Horn; Texas Tech	Mesquite, TX
G	11	Sydney Bowles	6 ft 0 in (1.83 m)	Sr	Woodward Academy; Texas A&M	Lithonia, GA
G	12	Emma Risch	6 ft 1 in (1.85 m)	Jr	Palm Bay Magnet; Notre Dame	Melbourne, FL
G	13	Tatum Greene	6 ft 3 in (1.91 m)	So	Saint John's; Boston College	Baltimore, MD
G	15	Solé Williams	5 ft 9 in (1.75 m)	So	Princeton; Texas Tech	Cincinnati, OH
C	24	Pania Davis	6 ft 6 in (1.98 m)	Jr	New Mexico Junior College	Perth, Australia
F	32	Avery Treadwell	6 ft 3 in (1.91 m)	So	Bearden	Knoxville, TN

Head coach

- Brooke Wyckoff (Florida State)

Assistant coach(es)

- Bill Ferrara (Florida)
- Morgan Toles (Florida State)
- Desma Thomas Bateast (Miami (FL))
- Adam Surguine (Lancaster Bible College)

Legend

- (C) Team captain
- (S) Suspended
- (I) Ineligible
- (W) Walk-on
- Injured
- Current redshirt

Roster
Last update: September 24, 2025

== Schedule and results ==
Date time, TV	Rank^{#}	Opponent^{#}	Result	Record	High points	High rebounds	High assists	Site (attendance) city, state
Exhibition
October 16, 2025*; 1:00 p.m., YouTube		vs. Alabama; Ballin' in Boutwell	L 71–91	–	21 – Bowles	9 – Davis	2 – Williams	Boutwell Memorial Auditorium (1,721); Birmingham, AL
October 28, 2025*; 6:00 p.m., ACCNX		Tampa	W 84–63	–	17 – Davis	10 – Kubek	2 – Tied	Donald L. Tucker Center (–); Tallahassee, FL
Regular season
November 3, 2025*; 6:00 p.m., ACCNX		Florida A&M	W 112–39	1–0	18 – Williams	10 – Greene	4 – Williams	Donald L. Tucker Center (2,011); Tallahassee, FL
November 6, 2025*; 6:00 p.m., ACCNX		Georgia Southern	W 89–72	2–0	15 – Tied	8 – Greene	4 – Tied	Donald L. Tucker Center (1,660); Tallahassee, FL
November 9, 2025*; 4:30 p.m., FS1		at No. 1 UConn	L 67–99	2–1	14 – Williams	6 – Davis	4 – Bowles	Harry A. Gampel Pavilion (10,244); Storrs, CT
November 12, 2025*; 11:00 a.m., ACCNX		Nicholls State	W 89–64	3–1	28 – Shavers	10 – Davis	5 – Greene	Donald L. Tucker Center (3,697); Tallahassee, FL
November 16, 2025*; 5:00 p.m., ACCN		Indiana	L 72–76	3–2	19 – Bowles	7 – Tied	4 – Bowles	Donald L. Tucker Center (2,104); Tallahassee, FL
November 20, 2025*; 6:30 p.m., SECN		at Florida; Rivalry	L 67–89	3–3	19 – Davis	9 – Davis	7 – Bowles	O'Connell Center (1,746); Gainesville, FL
November 23, 2025*; 2:00 p.m., ACCNX		Illinois	L 63–86	3–4	18 – Williams	7 – Kubek	4 – Bowles	Donald L. Tucker Center (1,502); Tallahassee, FL
November 28, 2025*; 4:00 p.m., FloHoops		vs. Missouri State; Coconut Hoops Great Egret Division semifinal	W 85–75	4–4	21 – Williams	5 – Tied	2 – Tied	Alico Arena (952); Fort Myers, FL
November 30, 2025*; 6:30 p.m., FloHoops		vs. No. 9 Oklahoma; Coconut Hoops Great Egret Division championship	L 91–109	4–5	24 – Shavers	6 – Tied	5 – Williams	Alico Arena (1,204); Fort Myers, FL
December 3, 2025*; 5:00 p.m., ESPNU		Georgia; ACC–SEC Challenge	L 60–80	4–6	13 – Williams	9 – Davis	7 – Williams	Donald L. Tucker Center (1,155); Tallahassee, FL
December 7, 2025; 2:00 p.m., ACCNX		No. 18 Notre Dame	L 58–93	4–7 (0–1)	16 – Kubek	6 – Risch	4 – Risch	Donald L. Tucker Center (1,986); Tallahassee, FL
December 14, 2025*; 2:00 p.m., ACCNX		College of Charleston	L 70–75	4–8	18 – Risch	9 – Treadwell	4 – Bonner	Donald L. Tucker Center (1,108); Tallahassee, FL
December 18, 2025; 6:00 p.m., ACCNX		Virginia Tech	L 54–79	4–9 (0–2)	19 – Shavers	8 – Shavers	2 – Tied	Donald L. Tucker Center (1,277); Tallahassee, FL
December 20, 2025*; 2:00 p.m., ACCNX		South Carolina State	W 89–41	5–9	29 – Shavers	16 – Davis	4 – Tied	Donald L. Tucker Center (1,225); Tallahassee, FL
January 1, 2026; 6:00 p.m., ACCNX		at Syracuse	L 72–82	5–10 (0–3)	21 – Williams	5 – Shavers	4 – Tied	JMA Wireless Dome (2,713); Syracuse, NY
January 4, 2026; 2:00 p.m., ACCN		Virginia	L 87–91 ^{2OT}	5–11 (0–4)	28 – Williams	10 – Greene	5 – Bonner	Donald L. Tucker Center (1,126); Tallahassee, FL
January 11, 2026; 2:00 p.m., ACCN		at Miami (FL); Rivalry	L 73–89	5–12 (0–5)	19 – Williams	8 – Tied	3 – Tied	Watsco Center (1,137); Coral Gables, FL
January 15, 2026; 6:00 p.m., ACCNX		at Pittsburgh	W 69–65	6–12 (1–5)	24 – Bowles	10 – Davis	4 – Bonner	Petersen Events Center (743); Pittsburgh, PA
January 18, 2026; 2:00 p.m., The CW		North Carolina	L 55–82	6–13 (1–6)	15 – Shavers	5 – Greene	2 – Tied	Donald L. Tucker Center (1,518); Tallahassee, FL
January 22, 2026; 7:30 p.m., ACCNX		at SMU	W 73–51	7–13 (2–6)	22 – Shavers	14 – Davis	6 – Williams	Donald L. Tucker Center (1,109); Tallahassee, FL
January 25, 2026; 4:00 p.m., ACCN		Georgia Tech	L 69–80	7–14 (2–7)	18 – Williams	9 – Davis	4 – Bonner	Donald L. Tucker Center (1,215); Tallahassee, FL
February 1, 2026; 6:00 p.m., ACCN		at Clemson	L 58–77	7–15 (2–8)	23 – Williams	9 – Greene	2 – Tied	Littlejohn Coliseum (1,118); Clemson, SC
February 5, 2026; 8:00 p.m., ACCN		at NC State	L 55–83	7–16 (2–9)	12 – Treadwell	12 – Treadwell	4 – Williams	Reynolds Coliseum (4,973); Raleigh, NC
February 8, 2026; 2:00 p.m., ACCNX		Miami (FL); Rivalry	W 87–70	8–16 (3–9)	22 – Greene	7 – Greene	5 – Williams	Donald L. Tucker Center (1,312); Tallahassee, FL
February 12, 2026; 6:00 p.m., ACCNX		Boston College	W 85–76	9–16 (4–9)	23 – Williams	10 – Shavers	5 – Bonner	Donald L. Tucker Center (1,050); Tallahassee, FL
February 15, 2026; 6:00 p.m., ACCN		at No. 9 Louisville	L 65–88	9–17 (4–10)	19 – Williams	10 – Kubek	4 – Williams	KFC Yum! Center (8,106); Louisville, KY
February 19, 2026; 6:00 p.m., ACCNX		California	L 62–75	9–18 (4–11)	17 – Bowles	6 – Davis	2 – Bonner	Donald L. Tucker Center (1,605); Tallahassee, FL
February 22, 2026; 2:00 p.m., ACCN		Stanford	L 61–77	9–19 (4–12)	17 – Williams	6 – Bonner	3 – Williams	Donald L. Tucker Center (1,686); Tallahassee, FL
February 26, 2026; 8:00 p.m., ACCN		at No. 12 Duke	L 52–80	9–20 (4–13)	21 – Shavers	8 – Greene	2 – Shavers	Cameron Indoor Stadium (3,020); Durham, NC
March 1, 2026; 4:00 p.m., ACCN		at Wake Forest	W 77–74 ^{OT}	10–20 (5–13)	17 – Bowles	8 – Tied	6 – Shavers	LJVM Coliseum (1,456); Winston-Salem, NC
ACC women's tournament
March 4, 2026; 4:00 p.m., ACCN	(14)	vs. (11) Georgia Tech; First round	L 60–72	10–21	16 – Bowles	8 – Greene	4 – Williams	Gas South Arena (5,192); Duluth, GA
*Non-conference game. ^{#}Rankings from AP poll. (#) Tournament seedings in parentheses. All times are in Eastern.

== Rankings ==
Ranking movements Legend: ██ Increase in ranking ██ Decrease in ranking — = Not ranked RV = Received votes
	Week																				
Poll	Pre	1	2	3	4	5	6	7	8	9	10	11	12	13	14	15	16	17	18	19	Final
AP	—	—	—	—	—	—	—	—	—	—	—	—	—	—	—	—	—	—	—	—	—
Coaches	RV	—	—	—	—	—	—	—	—	—	—	—	—	—	—	—	—	—	—	—	—
