= Tessa Johnson =

American basketball player

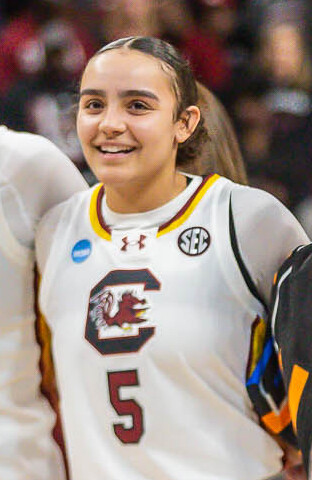
- Johnson with South Carolina in 2024

No. 5 – South Carolina Gamecocks
- Position: Guard
- League: Southeastern Conference

Personal information
- Listed height: 6 ft 0 in (1.83 m)

Career information
- High school: St. Michael-Albertville (St. Michael, Minnesota)
- College: South Carolina (2023–present)

Career highlights
- Second Team All-SEC (2026); NCAA champion (2024); McDonald's All-American (2023); Minnesota Miss Basketball (2023)

Tessa Johnson is an American college basketball player for the South Carolina Gamecocks of the Southeastern Conference (SEC).

== High school career ==
Johnson played basketball for St. Michael-Albertville High School in St. Michael, Minnesota. She missed her sophomore season with a broken leg. As a senior, Johnson led her team to the Class 4A state championship. She was named Minnesota Miss Basketball, Minnesota Gatorade Player of the Year and Star Tribune Metro Player of the Year, while being selected to play in the McDonald's All-American Game. Rated a four-star recruit by ESPN, she committed to play college basketball for South Carolina over offers from Minnesota and Baylor.

== College career ==
As a freshman, Johnson scored a career-high and a team-high 19 points in an 87–75 win over Iowa at the 2024 national championship game. She finished the season averaging 6.2 points per game.

== Career statistics ==
Legend
GP	Games played	GS	Games started	MPG	Minutes per game	RPG	Rebounds per game
APG	Assists per game	SPG	Steals per game	BPG	Blocks per game	PPG	Points per game
TO	Turnovers per game	FG%	Field-goal percentage	3P%	3-point field-goal percentage	FT%	Free-throw percentage
**Bold**	Career best	°	League leader

=== College ===
Year	Team	GP	GS	MPG	FG%	3P%	FT%	RPG	APG	SPG	BPG	TO	PPG
2023–24	South Carolina	35	2	17.9	44.7	43.2	**86.3**	1.7	1.1	**0.7**	0.1	**0.9**	6.6
2024–25	South Carolina	36	0	21.1	**47.7**	42.7	82.5	2.2	1.5	**0.7**	**0.4**	1.2	8.3
2025–26	South Carolina	**38**	**38**	**28.2**	46.9	**44.8**	82.7	**3.4**	**2.5**	0.6	0.3	1.3	**12.8**
**Career**		110	40	22.5	46.6	44.0	83.8	2.4	1.7	0.7	0.2	1.2	9.3
Statistics retrieved from Sports-Reference.

== Personal life ==
Johnson's older sister, Rae, played college basketball for Iowa State.

In April 2025, Johnson was invited to Kelsey Plum's Dawg Class, an Under Armour-sponsored camp to help top college athletes transition from collegiate to professional basketball.
