= Addy Brown =

American basketball player

- Brown in 2026

No. 24 – UCLA Bruins
- Position: Forward
- League: Big Ten Conference

Personal information
- Born: September 28, 2004 (age 22)
- Listed height: 6 ft 2 in (1.88 m)

Career information
- High school: Derby (Derby, Kansas)
- College: Iowa State (2023–2026); UCLA (2026–present)

Career highlights
- Big 12 All-Freshman Team (2023); McDonald's All-American (2023)

Addyson "Addy" Brown (born September 28, 2004) is an American college basketball player for the UCLA Bruins. She previously played for the Iowa State Cyclones.

== High school career ==
Brown played for Derby High School in Derby, Kansas. She averaged 20.4 points, 10.4 rebounds, 4.1 assists, and 2.6 steals as a senior, and was a two-time first-team Class 6A All-State. She was the 2023 Kansas Gatorade Player of the Year, and was named to the McDonald's All-American Game. Brown was a four-star recruit and the number 31 recruit in the class of 2023. On March 16, 2022, she committed to Iowa State over offers from Kansas State, Oklahoma State, TCU, and Texas Tech.

== College career ==
=== Iowa State ===
As a freshman, Brown averaged 13 points and 4.8 assists per game, leading the team with 8.3 rebounds per game. She broke the freshman double-double program with 10. She scored a career-high 24 points in three games, including a double-double against Kansas State on February 28, 2024. Brown was named as an All-Big 12 Honorable mention and to the Big-12 All-Freshman team.

In her sophomore year, Brown averaged 15.2 points, 7.7 rebounds, and 5.4 assists per game. She earned Big 12 Player of the Week in February for the first time in her career after scoring 20 points and eight assists against Kansas State on January 31, 2025, and a then-career high 30 points in a loss to TCU on February 2, 2025. In the postseason, she scored a career-high 41 points in the second round of the Big 12 Tournament against Arizona State, the third most points in tournament history. Brown was named to the second-team All-Big 12 and a third-team Academic All-American.

=== UCLA ===
On April 23, 2026, Brown announced she would transfer to play for the UCLA Bruins.

== Personal life ==
Brown's parents both played college basketball at Butler County Community College from 1991 to 1993. Her mom continued at Michigan State from 1993 to 1995. Brown's older sister Kennedy played college basketball at Oregon State and Duke.

== Career statistics ==
Legend
GP	Games played	GS	Games started	MPG	Minutes per game	RPG	Rebounds per game
APG	Assists per game	SPG	Steals per game	BPG	Blocks per game	PPG	Points per game
TO	Turnovers per game	FG%	Field-goal percentage	3P%	3-point field-goal percentage	FT%	Free-throw percentage
**Bold**	Career best	°	League leader

Year	Team	GP	GS	MPG	FG%	3P%	FT%	RPG	APG	SPG	BPG	TO	PPG
2023–24	Iowa State	33	33	**33.0**	47.4	**38.8**	74.2	8.2	4.8	**0.8**	0.5	3.2	13.0
2024–25	Iowa State	**35**	**35**	32.0	**48.7**	36.2	75.8	7.7	**5.4**	0.6	0.5	2.8	**15.2**
2025–26	Iowa State	21	21	28.6	43.1	33.8	**77.6**	**8.8**	5.3	0.5	**0.9**	**2.0**	11.9
**Career**		89	89	31.5	47.0	36.7	75.8	8.1	5.2	0.7	0.6	2.8	13.6
Statistics retrieved from Sports-Reference.
