= 2025–26 Wake Forest Demon Deacons women's basketball team =

Intercollegiate basketball season

2025–26 Wake Forest Demon Deacons women's basketball

WNIT, First Round
- Conference: Atlantic Coast Conference
- Record: 14–18 (4–14 ACC)
- Head coach: Megan Gebbia (4th season)
- Assistant coaches: Nikki Flores (4th season); Emily Stallings (4th season); Darrick Gibbs (1st season)
- Home arena: LJVM Coliseum

2025–26 ACC women's basketball standings
	Conf.				Overall
Team	W		L	PCT	W		L	PCT
No. 5 Duke †	16	–	2	.889	27	–	9	.750
No. 11 Louisville	15	–	3	.833	29	–	8	.784
No. 13 North Carolina	14	–	4	.778	28	–	8	.778
NC State	13	–	5	.722	21	–	11	.656
No. 9 Notre Dame	12	–	6	.667	25	–	10	.714
Virginia Tech	12	–	6	.667	23	–	10	.697
Syracuse	12	–	6	.667	24	–	9	.727
No. 19 Virginia	11	–	7	.611	22	–	12	.647
Clemson	11	–	7	.611	21	–	12	.636
California	9	–	9	.500	21	–	15	.583
Georgia Tech	8	–	10	.444	14	–	19	.424
Miami (FL)	8	–	10	.444	18	–	15	.545
Stanford	8	–	10	.444	21	–	14	.600
Florida State	5	–	13	.278	10	–	21	.323
Wake Forest	4	–	14	.222	14	–	18	.438
SMU	2	–	16	.111	9	–	21	.300
Pittsburgh	1	–	17	.056	8	–	23	.258
Boston College	1	–	17	.056	5	–	26	.161
† 2026 ACC tournament winner Rankings from AP Poll

The 2025–26 Wake Forest Demon Deacons women's basketball team represented Wake Forest University during the 2025–26 NCAA Division I women's basketball season. The Demon Deacons were led by fourth-year head coach Megan Gebbia, and competed as members of the Atlantic Coast Conference. They played their home games at the Lawrence Joel Veterans Memorial Coliseum in Winston-Salem, North Carolina.

The Demon Deacons started the season by winning their first six games in a row, all against non-Power 4 opponents, and all at home. The closest games of the stretch were a five-point win over Mercer and a three-point victory over North Carolina Central. The team then traveled to San Juan, Puerto Rico to participate in the Puerto Rico Shootout. They won all three games there, including an overtime victory over UCF. They also recorded their first Power 4 win with a victory over Illinois. Their winning streak ended as they returned to North carolina and lost to William & Mary and Georgetown. Wake Forest began ACC play with a one-point victory over Georgia Tech and a three-point loss to Miami. After winning their final non-conference game, they also defeated Pittsburgh to start 2026. They lost their next eight ACC games in a row. The streak included an overtime loss against Clemson and a triple-overtime loss against Virginia. The stretch saw the Demon Deacons face their first ranked team of the season, twentieth-ranked Duke. They broke the streak by defeating SMU 70–65. However, they could not convert that into a winning streak, as they lost five of their last six ACC games. Their lone win came against Boston College. They lost to twenty-fifth ranked North Carolina and ninth-ranked Louisville over the stretch. Their final regular season game of the season was a 74–77 overtime loss against Florida State.

The Demon Deacons finished the season 14–18 overall and 4–14 in ACC play to finish in fifteenth place. As the fifteenth seed in the 2026 ACC tournament, they lost to tenth seed California in the first round. They were invited to the WNIT, where they lost to Maryland Eastern Shore 59–48 in the first round to end their season.

== Previous season ==
The Demon Deacons finished the season 9–20 overall and 2–16 in ACC play to finish in a tie for seventeenth place. Under the new ACC tournament rules, they did not qualify for the 2025 ACC tournament. They were not invited to the NCAA tournament or the WBIT.

== Off-season ==
=== Departures ===
Departures
Name	Number	Pos.	Height	Year	Hometown	Reason for departure
Alyssa Andrews	0	G	6'0"	Senior	Woodbridge, Virginia	Graduated; entered transfer portal
Makaela Quimby	1	G	5'9"	Sophomore	Owings Mills, Maryland	—
Malaya Cowles	5	F	6'3"	(redshirt) Junior	Wilkesboro, North Carolina	Transferred to Notre Dame
Raegyn Conley	11	G	6'0"	Senior	Chattanooga, Tennessee	Graduated
Rylie Theuerkauf	14	G	5'9"	Sophomore	Tenafly, New Jersey	Transferred to Georgia
Elise Williams	21	G	5'9"	Senior	Raleigh, North Carolina	Graduated
Demeara Hinds	25	F	6'2"	(redshirt) Senior	Douglasville, Georgia	Transferred to Clemson

=== Incoming transfers ===
Incoming transfers
Name	Number	Pos.	Height	Year	Hometown	Previous school
Raven Preston	1	G	5'11"	(redshirt) Junior	Greensboro, North Carolina	Elon
Grace Oliver	13	F	6'1"	Sophomore	Norwell, Massachusetts	Colorado
Mary Carter	14	G/F	6'3"	(redshirt) Junior	Rocklin, California	Cal Poly

=== Recruiting class ===
College recruiting
Name	Hometown	School	Height	Weight	Commit date
Opal Bird; F	Sydney, Australia	Australian Institute of Sport	6 ft 3 in (1.91 m)	N/A	Nov 13, 2024
Opal Bird; F	Recruit ratings: ESPN: (NR)				
Milan Brown; G	Baltimore, Maryland	Mercy	5 ft 8 in (1.73 m)	N/A	Nov 13, 2024
Milan Brown; G	Recruit ratings: ESPN: (NR)				
Grace Galbavy; G	Pennsburg, Pennsylvania	Perkiomen Valley	6 ft 0 in (1.83 m)	N/A	Aug 24, 2024
Grace Galbavy; G	Recruit ratings: ESPN: (NR)				
Caitlyn Jones; G	Rolesville, North Carolina	Rolesville	5 ft 8 in (1.73 m)	N/A	Jul 1, 2024
Caitlyn Jones; G	Recruit ratings: 247Sports: ESPN: (NR)				
Savannah Metcalfe; F	Perth, Australia	Penrhos College	6 ft 5 in (1.96 m)	N/A	Apr 16, 2025
Savannah Metcalfe; F	Recruit ratings: ESPN: (NR)				
Overall recruit ranking:
Note: In many cases, Scout, Rivals, 247Sports, On3, and ESPN may conflict in their listings of height and weight.; In these cases, the average was taken. ESPN grades are on a 100-point scale.; Sources:

== Roster ==
2025–26 Wake Forest Demon Deacons women's basketball team
Players
Coaches

Pos.	#	Name	Height	Year	Previous school	Hometown
G	0	Milan Brown	5 ft 8 in (1.73 m)	Fr	Mercy	Baltimore, MD
G	1	Raven Preston	5 ft 11 in (1.8 m)	RS Jr	Quality Education School; Elon	Greensboro, NC
G	2	Aurora Sørbye	5 ft 9 in (1.75 m)	So	Metis Sports Athlete	Bergen, Norway
G	5	Caitlyn Jones	5 ft 8 in (1.73 m)	Fr	Rolesville	Rolesville, NC
F	7	Savannah Metcalfe	6 ft 5 in (1.96 m)	Fr	Penrhos College	Perth, Australia
F	9	Opal Bird	6 ft 3 in (1.91 m)	Fr	Australian Institute of Sport	Sydney, Australia
F	13	Grace Oliver	6 ft 1 in (1.85 m)	So	Noble and Greenough School; Colorado	Norwell, MA
G/F	14	Mary Carter	6 ft 3 in (1.91 m)	RS Jr	Antelope; Cal Poly	Rocklin, CA
F	15	Kennedy Moore	6 ft 2 in (1.88 m)	So	Flathead	Kalispell, MT
G	22	Madisyn Jordan	6 ft 1 in (1.85 m)	Jr	Panther Creek	Morrisville, NC
G	35	Grace Galbavy	6 ft 0 in (1.83 m)	Fr	Perkiomen Valley	Pennsburg, PA
F	44	Emily Johns	6 ft 1 in (1.85 m)	GS	Washington Township; American	Washington Township, NJ

Head coach

- Megan Gebbia (Towson)

Assistant coach(es)

- Nikki Flores (Marist)
- Emily Stallings (East Stroudsburg)
- Darrick Gibbs (Wofford)

Legend

- (C) Team captain
- (S) Suspended
- (I) Ineligible
- (W) Walk-on
- Injured
- Current redshirt

Roster
Last update: October 19, 2025

== Schedule ==
Date time, TV	Rank^{#}	Opponent^{#}	Result	Record	High points	High rebounds	High assists	Site (attendance) city, state
Regular season
November 3, 2025*; 5:00 p.m., ACCNX		Radford	W 71–64	1–0	16 – Carter	12 – Brown	3 – Tied	LJVM Coliseum (1,043); Winston-Salem, NC
November 6, 2025*; 6:00 p.m., ACCNX		Presbyterian	W 78–41	2–0	14 – Brown	7 – Tied	4 – Moore	LJVM Coliseum (950); Winston-Salem, NC
November 9, 2025*; 2:00 p.m., ACCNX		Hampton	W 77–48	3–0	13 – Preston	7 – Tied	5 – Sørbye	LJVM Coliseum (1,071); Winston-Salem, NC
November 13, 2025*; 6:00 p.m., ACCNX		Mercer	W 66–61	4–0	21 – Oliver	9 – Preston	8 – Bird	LJVM Coliseum (1,000); Winston-Salem, NC
November 20, 2025*; 8:00 p.m., ACCN		North Carolina Central	W 68–65	5–0	19 – Oliver	8 – Tied	7 – Brown	LJVM Coliseum (966); Winston-Salem, NC
November 23, 2025*; 1:00 p.m., ACCNX		Western Carolina	W 60–49	6–0	13 – Tied	7 – Carter	4 – Tied	LJVM Coliseum (1,191); Winston-Salem, NC
November 26, 2025*; 5:00 p.m., FloSports		vs. Morgan State; Puerto Rico Shootout	W 93–35	7–0	19 – Brown	9 – Brown	6 – Brown	Coliseo Guillermo Angulo (250); San Juan, PR
November 27, 2025*; 2:30 p.m., FloSports		vs. UCF; Puerto Rico Shootout	W 65–60 ^{OT}	8–0	17 – Jones	9 – Preston	8 – Preston	Coliseo Guillermo Angulo (250); San Juan, PR
November 28, 2025*; 12:00 p.m., FloSports		vs. Illinois; Puerto Rico Shootout	W 57–44	9–0	11 – Tied	5 – Brown	4 – Bird	Coliseo Guillermo Angulo (250); San Juan, PR
December 3, 2025*; 11:30 a.m., ACCNX		William & Mary	L 64–67	9–1	15 – Carter	7 – Carter	4 – Tied	LJVM Coliseum (5,375); Winston-Salem, NC
December 7, 2025*; 2:00 p.m., ACCNX		Georgetown	L 56–58	9–2	17 – Oliver	7 – Tied	5 – Carter	LJVM Coliseum (1,040); Winston-Salem, NC
December 14, 2025; 2:00 p.m., ACCNX		Georgia Tech	W 57–56	10–2 (1–0)	14 – Tied	8 – Carter	4 – Sørbye	LJVM Coliseum (1,220); Winston-Salem, NC
December 18, 2025; 6:00 p.m., ACCNX		Miami (FL)	L 61–64	10–3 (1–1)	13 – Carter	6 – Tied	7 – Sørbye	LJVM Coliseum (977); Winston-Salem, NC
December 22, 2025*; 1:00 p.m., ACCNX		Gardner–Webb	W 78–66	11–3	30 – Oliver	10 – Brown	7 – Bird	LJVM Coliseum (1,049); Winston-Salem, NC
January 1, 2026; 6:00 p.m., ACCNX		at Pittsburgh	W 74–55	12–3 (2–1)	17 – Oliver	10 – Bird	9 – Bird	Petersen Events Center (721); Pittsburgh, PA
January 4, 2026; 2:00 p.m., ACCNX		Syracuse	L 58–73	12–4 (2–2)	16 – Oliver	10 – Brown	5 – Bird	LJVM Coliseum (1,258); Winston-Salem, NC
January 8, 2026; 10:00 p.m., ACCNX		at Stanford	L 43–55	12–5 (2–3)	11 – Tied	7 – Tied	3 – Tied	Maples Pavilion (2,475); Stanford, CA
January 11, 2026; 5:00 p.m., ACCNX		at California	L 52–61	12–6 (2–4)	14 – Carter	7 – Tied	7 – Jones	Haas Pavilion (1,652); Berkeley, CA
January 15, 2026; 6:00 p.m., ACCNX		NC State	L 77–95	12–7 (2–5)	15 – Carter	7 – Carter	6 – Bird	LJVM Coliseum (1,858); Winston-Salem, NC
January 18, 2026; 12:00 p.m., ACCN		at Clemson	L 71–78 ^{OT}	12–8 (2–6)	16 – Tied	11 – Oliver	5 – Bird	Littlejohn Coliseum (1,133); Clemson, SC
January 24, 2026; 5:00 p.m., ACCNX		Virginia Tech	L 57–85	12–9 (2–7)	13 – Tied	8 – Oliver	6 – Bird	LJVM Coliseum (1,177); Winston-Salem, NC
January 29, 2026; 6:00 p.m., ACCNX		Virginia	L 103–109 ^{3OT}	12–10 (2–8)	30 – Brown	11 – Brown	5 – Brown	LJVM Coliseum (1,178); Winston-Salem, NC
February 1, 2026; 6:00 p.m., ACCN		at No. 20 Duke	L 44–80	12–11 (2–9)	13 – Brown	17 – Brown	3 – Jones	Cameron Indoor Stadium (2,502); Durham, NC
February 5, 2026; 7:30 p.m., ACCNX		at SMU	W 70–65	13–11 (3–9)	18 – Sørbye	10 – Brown	4 – Tied	Moody Coliseum (1,361); University Park, TX
February 8, 2026; 2:00 p.m., ACCN		No. 25 North Carolina	L 56–84	13–12 (3–10)	13 – Brown	5 – Tied	4 – Bird	LJVM Coliseum (2,284); Winston-Salem, NC
February 12, 2026; 7:00 p.m., ACCNX		at No. 9 Louisville	L 67–86	13–13 (3–11)	20 – Oliver	9 – Oliver	4 – Jones	KFC Yum! Center (7,436); Louisville, KY
February 19, 2026; 6:00 p.m., ACCNX		Notre Dame	L 54–78	13–14 (3–12)	13 – Johns	7 – Oliver	3 – Tied	LJVM Coliseum (1,521); Winston-Salem, NC
February 22, 2026; 12:00 p.m., ACCNX		at Boston College	W 79–65	14–14 (4–12)	24 – Oliver	15 – Oliver	4 – Tied	Conte Forum (1,113); Chestnut Hill, MA
February 26, 2026; 7:00 p.m., ACCNX		at NC State	L 56–65	14–15 (4–13)	20 – Oliver	6 – Tied	5 – Brown	Reynolds Coliseum (5,500); Raleigh, NC
March 1, 2026; 2:00 p.m., ACCN		Florida State	L 74–77 ^{OT}	14–16 (4–14)	23 – Oliver	7 – Oliver	8 – Sørbye	LJVM Coliseum; Winston-Salem, NC
ACC tournament
March 4, 2026*; 1:30 p.m., ACCN	(15)	vs. (10) California; First Round	L 52–75	14–17	13 – Carter	9 – Brown	3 – Tied	Gas South Arena (5,192); Duluth, GA
WNIT
March 19, 2026*; 6:00 p.m., ESPN+		Maryland Eastern Shore; First Round	L 48–59	14–18	19 – Carter	8 – Moore	4 – Johns	LJVM Coliseum (545); Winston-Salem, NC
*Non-conference game. ^{#}Rankings from AP Poll. (#) Tournament seedings in parentheses. All times are in Eastern.
