= 2025–26 Syracuse Orange women's basketball team =

Intercollegiate basketball season

2025–26 Syracuse Orange women's basketball

NCAA tournament, Second Round
- Conference: Atlantic Coast Conference
- Record: 24–9 (12–6 ACC)
- Head coach: Felisha Legette-Jack (4th season)
- Associate head coach: Natasha Adair (1st season)
- Assistant coaches: Khyreed Carter (4th season); Amber Moore (1st season); Caleb Samson (1st season)
- Home arena: JMA Wireless Dome

2025–26 ACC women's basketball standings
	Conf.				Overall
Team	W		L	PCT	W		L	PCT
No. 5 Duke †	16	–	2	.889	27	–	9	.750
No. 11 Louisville	15	–	3	.833	29	–	8	.784
No. 13 North Carolina	14	–	4	.778	28	–	8	.778
NC State	13	–	5	.722	21	–	11	.656
No. 9 Notre Dame	12	–	6	.667	25	–	10	.714
Virginia Tech	12	–	6	.667	23	–	10	.697
Syracuse	12	–	6	.667	24	–	9	.727
No. 19 Virginia	11	–	7	.611	22	–	12	.647
Clemson	11	–	7	.611	21	–	12	.636
California	9	–	9	.500	21	–	15	.583
Georgia Tech	8	–	10	.444	14	–	19	.424
Miami (FL)	8	–	10	.444	18	–	15	.545
Stanford	8	–	10	.444	21	–	14	.600
Florida State	5	–	13	.278	10	–	21	.323
Wake Forest	4	–	14	.222	14	–	18	.438
SMU	2	–	16	.111	9	–	21	.300
Pittsburgh	1	–	17	.056	8	–	23	.258
Boston College	1	–	17	.056	5	–	26	.161
† 2026 ACC tournament winner Rankings from AP Poll

The 2025–26 Syracuse Orange women's basketball team represented Syracuse University during the 2025–26 NCAA Division I women's basketball season. The Orange were led by fourth-year head coach Felisha Legette-Jack. The Orange were twelfth-year members of the Atlantic Coast Conference and played their home games at the JMA Wireless Dome in Syracuse, New York.

The Orange began the season with four straight victories before heading to Uncasville, Connecticut to participate in the Hall of Fame Women's Showcase. There, they defeated Utah before losing their first game of the season against sixth-ranked Michigan. The team defeated Auburn 66–60 in the ACC–SEC Challenge and won their opening ACC game over SMU as part of a six-game winning streak. The streak was broken as Syracuse lost to Duke by twenty points to close the 2025 calendar year. The Orange began 2026 by going 5–1 over their first six games, with their only loss coming against Virginia Tech. The highlight of the five wins was a triple overtime over California. Syrcause went 3–2 over their next five games, earning two road victories at Boston College and Miami, but losing to North Carolina in overtime and sixth-ranked Louisville. The Orange again went 3–2 over their final five games, defeating Clemson by four points and losing to NC State and Notre Dame.

The Orange finished the season 24–9 overall and 12–6 in ACC play to finish in a three-way tie for fifth place. As the seventh seed in the ACC tournament, they earned a bye into the second round, where they faced tenth seed California. The Orange won by eleven points, but did not continue to advance, as they lost in the quarterfinals to second seed and twelfth-ranked Louisville. They earned an at-large invitation to the NCAA tournament, where they were the ninth seed in the Forth Worth 1 regional. The Orange defeated ninth-seed Iowa State in the first round before falling to top seed and top ranked UConn in a rivalry game in the second round.

== Previous season ==
The Orange finished the season 12–18 overall and 6–12 in ACC play to finish in a tie for twelfth place. As the thirteenth seed in the ACC tournament, they faced twelfth seed Boston College in a rematch of the regular season finale. The Orange lost the rematch 76–73 after splitting the season series 1–1. They were not invited to the NCAA tournament or the WBIT.

== Off-season ==
=== Departures ===
Departures
Name	Number	Pos.	Height	Year	Hometown	Reason for departure
Georgia Woolley	5	G	6'0"	Senior	Brisbane, Australia	Graduated
Lexi McNabb	11	G	5'7"	Junior	Chandler, Arizona	Graduated
Saniaa Wilson	21	F	6'0"	Senior	Rochester, New York	Graduated
Kyra Wood	22	F	6'3"	Senior	Buffalo, New York	Graduated
Dominique Camp	24	G	5'8"	Graduate student	Dayton, Ohio	Graduated
Izabel Varejão	34	C	6'4"	Graduate student	Vitória, Brazil	Graduated

=== Incoming transfers ===
Incoming transfers
Name	Number	Pos.	Height	Year	Hometown	Previous school
Aurora Almón	0	F	6'4"	Sophomore	Santo Domingo, Dominican Republic	Miami (FL)
Laila Phelia	5	G	6'0"	Graduate student	Cincinnati, Ohio	Texas
Dominique Darius	20	G	5'10"	Graduate student	Jacksonville, Florida	USC
Oyindamola Akinbolawa	25	C	6'5"	Senior	Lagos, Nigeria	Auburn

=== Recruiting class ===
College recruiting
Name	Hometown	School	Height	Weight	Commit date
Jasmyn Cooper; F	North Easton, Massachusetts	Noble and Greenough	6 ft 1 in (1.85 m)	N/A	Jul 1, 2025
Jasmyn Cooper; F	Recruit ratings: ESPN: (93)				
Justus Fitzgerald; F	Roswell, Georgia	Roswell	6 ft 1 in (1.85 m)	N/A	Nov 14, 2024
Justus Fitzgerald; F	Recruit ratings: ESPN: (NR)				
Camdyn Nelson; G	New Canaan, Connecticut	St. Luke's School	5 ft 8 in (1.73 m)	N/A	Apr 6, 2024
Camdyn Nelson; G	Recruit ratings: ESPN: (NR)				
Izoje Uche; C	Asaba, Nigeria	—	6 ft 3 in (1.91 m)	N/A	Jun 13, 2025
Izoje Uche; C	Recruit ratings: ESPN: (NR)				
Overall recruit ranking:
Note: In many cases, Scout, Rivals, 247Sports, On3, and ESPN may conflict in their listings of height and weight.; In these cases, the average was taken. ESPN grades are on a 100-point scale.; Sources:

== Roster ==
2025–26 Syracuse Orange women's basketball team
Players
Coaches

Pos.	#	Name	Height	Year	Previous school	Hometown
F	0	Aurora Almón	6 ft 4 in (1.93 m)	So	The Webb Schools; Miami (FL)	Santo Domingo, Dominican Republic
F	1	Keira Scott	6 ft 1 in (1.85 m)	So	DME Academy	Daytona Beach, FL
F	2	Journey Thompson	6 ft 3 in (1.91 m)	Sr	Peters Township; Arizona State	McMurray, PA
G	3	Olivia Schmitt	5 ft 5 in (1.65 m)	So	DME Academy	Staten Island, NY
G	4	Sophie Burrows	6 ft 2 in (1.88 m)	Jr	Viewbank College	Victoria, Australia
G	5	Laila Phelia	6 ft 0 in (1.83 m)	GS	Mount Notre Dame; Texas	Cincinnati, OH
G	13	Camdyn Nelson	5 ft 8 in (1.73 m)	Fr	St. Luke's School	New Canaan, CT
F	14	Shy Hawkins	6 ft 2 in (1.88 m)	So	Long Island Lutheran	Brookville, NY
G	15	Angelica Velez	5 ft 7 in (1.7 m)	Jr	The Webb School; LSU	The Bronx, NY
G	17	Madeline Potts	6 ft 0 in (1.83 m)	So	Templestowe College	Victoria, Australia
G	20	Dominique Darius	5 ft 10 in (1.78 m)	GS	Blair Academy; USC	Jacksonville, FL
F	22	Justus Fitzgerald	6 ft 1 in (1.85 m)	Fr	Roswell	Roswell, GA
C	25	Oyindamola Akinbolawa	6 ft 5 in (1.96 m)	Sr	Zenith League; Auburn	Lagos, Nigeria
F	30	Jasmyn Cooper	6 ft 1 in (1.85 m)	Fr	Noble and Greenough	North Easton, MA
C	44	Izoje Uche	6 ft 3 in (1.91 m)	Fr		Asaba, Nigeria

Head coach

- Felisha Legette-Jack (Syracuse)

Assistant coach(es)

- Natasha Adair (South Florida)
- Khyreed Carter (Michigan State)
- Amber Moore (Illinois)
- Caleb Samson (Illinois)

Legend

- (C) Team captain
- (S) Suspended
- (I) Ineligible
- (W) Walk-on
- Injured
- Current redshirt

Roster
Last update: October 17, 2025

== Schedule ==
Date time, TV	Rank^{#}	Opponent^{#}	Result	Record	High points	High rebounds	High assists	Site (attendance) city, state
Exhibition
October 28, 2025*; 7:00 p.m., ACCNX		Daemen	W 98-62	–	19 – Izoje	8 – Tied	6 – Velez	JMA Wireless Dome (537); Syracuse, NY
Regular season
November 4, 2025*; 7:00 p.m., ACCNX		Stony Brook	W 74–50	1–0	13 – Hawkins	8 – Darius	4 – Tied	JMA Wireless Dome (2,052); Syracuse, NY
November 7, 2025*; 7:00 p.m., ACCNX		Albany	W 64–45	2–0	14 – Izoje	7 – Burrows	2 – Tied	JMA Wireless Dome (2,232); Syracuse, NY
November 11, 2025*; 7:00 p.m., ACCNX		Canisius	W 96–72	3–0	22 – Phelia	6 – Tied	3 – Tied	JMA Wireless Dome (2,405); Syracuse, NY
November 16, 2025*; 2:00 p.m., ACCNX		Wagner	W 78–29	4–0	15 – Phelia	8 – Akinbolawa	6 – Velez	JMA Wireless Dome (2,351); Syracuse, NY
November 21, 2025*; 5:00 p.m., FS2		vs. Utah; Hall of Fame Women's Showcase	W 61–49	5–0	16 – Darius	10 – Darius	6 – Burrows	Mohegan Sun Arena (6,312); Uncasville, CT
November 23, 2025*; 12:00 p.m., FS1		vs. No. 6 Michigan; Hall of Fame Women's Showcase	L 55–81	5–1	13 – Phelia	10 – Izoje	4 – Izoje	Mohegan Sun Arena (6,315); Uncasville, CT
November 30, 2025*; 2:00 p.m., ACCNX		Howard	W 78–62	6–1	20 – Izoje	9 – Izoje	9 – Velez	JMA Wireless Dome (2,445); Syracuse, NY
December 3, 2025*; 5:00 p.m., ACCN		Auburn; ACC–SEC Challenge	W 66–60	7–1	20 – Darius	13 – Izoje	3 – Darius	JMA Wireless Dome (2,166); Syracuse, NY
December 7, 2025; 3:00 p.m., ACCNX		at SMU	W 78–69	8–1 (1–0)	22 – Burrows	8 – Darius	5 – Tied	Moody Coliseum (1,211); University Park, TX
December 10, 2025*; 7:00 p.m., ACCNX		Colgate	W 88–42	9–1	16 – Izoje	8 – Izoje	10 – Darius	JMA Wireless Dome (2,283); Syracuse, NY
December 16, 2025*; 7:00 p.m., ACCNX		Binghamton	W 72–54	10–1	17 – Darius	14 – Izoje	4 – Darius	JMA Wireless Dome (2,072); Syracuse, NY
December 19, 2025*; 10:30 a.m., ACCNX		Mercyhurst	W 106–40	11–1	23 – Izoje	11 – Izoje	5 – Nelson	JMA Wireless Dome (10,226); Syracuse, NY
December 28, 2025; 4:00 p.m., ACCN		Duke	L 51–71	11–2 (1–1)	18 – Darius	7 – Thompson	3 – Burrows	JMA Wireless Dome (3,881); Syracuse, NY
January 1, 2026; 6:00 p.m., ACCNX		Florida State	W 82–72	12–2 (2–1)	21 – Izoje	17 – Izoje	5 – Tied	JMA Wireless Dome (2,713); Syracuse, NY
January 4, 2026; 2:00 p.m., ACCNX		at Wake Forest	W 73–58	13–2 (3–1)	18 – Izoje	12 – Izoje	9 – Darius	LJVM Coliseum (1,258); Winston-Salem, NC
January 8, 2026; 6:00 p.m., ACCNX		Virginia Tech	L 55–75	13–3 (3–2)	14 – Izoje	7 – Izoje	3 – Burrows	JMA Wireless Dome (2,318); Syracuse, NY
January 11, 2026; 2:00 p.m., ACCNX		at Virginia	W 79–60	14–3 (4–2)	38 – Phelia	7 – Izoje	5 – Schmitt	John Paul Jones Arena (5,797); Charlottesville, VA
January 15, 2026; 6:00 p.m., ACCNX		California	W 90–87 ^{3OT}	15–3 (5–2)	22 – Izoje	14 – Almón	3 – Tied	JMA Wireless Dome (2,312); Syracuse, NY
January 18, 2026; 2:00 p.m., ACCN		Stanford	W 69–58	16–3 (6–2)	26 – Darius	10 – Izoje	4 – Darius	JMA Wireless Dome (3,225); Syracuse, NY
January 25, 2026; 12:00 p.m., The CW		at North Carolina	L 71–77 ^{OT}	16–4 (6–3)	27 – Izoje	12 – Izoje	4 – Burrows	Carmichael Arena (467); Chapel Hill, NC
January 29, 2026; 6:00 p.m., ACCNX		Georgia Tech	W 94–70	17–4 (7–3)	23 – Phelia	15 – Izoje	3 – Tied	JMA Wireless Dome (2,350); Syracuse, NY
February 1, 2026; 2:00 p.m., ACCNX		at Miami (FL)	W 65–60	18–4 (8–3)	21 – Tied	12 – Izoje	5 – Phelia	Watsco Center (1,505); Coral Gables, FL
February 5, 2026; 6:00 p.m., ACCNX		at Boston College	W 93–59	19–4 (9–3)	18 – Izoje	8 – Izoje	10 – Darius	Conte Forum (623); Chestnut Hill, MA
February 8, 2026; 12:00 p.m., ACCNX		No. 6 Louisville	L 65–84	19–5 (9–4)	22 – Darius	8 – Izoje	2 – Tied	JMA Wireless Dome (3,617); Syracuse, NY
February 12, 2026; 6:00 p.m., ACCNX		at Pittsburgh	W 84–51	20–5 (10–4)	18 – Tied	5 – Tied	9 – Darius	Peterson Events Center (722); Pittsburgh, PA
February 15, 2026; 2:00 p.m., ACCNX		Clemson	W 68–64	21–5 (11–4)	19 – Burrows	16 – Burrows	2 – Tied	JMA Wireless Dome (4,847); Syracuse, NY
February 22, 2026; 2:00 p.m., The CW		at NC State	L 69–82	21–6 (11–5)	26 – Izoje	14 – Izoje	4 – Darius	Reynolds Coliseum (5,500); Raleigh, NC
February 26, 2026; 7:00 p.m., ACCNX		at Notre Dame	L 62–72	21–7 (11–6)	23 – Phelia	10 – Izoje	3 – Tied	Purcell Pavilion (6,833); Notre Dame, IN
March 1, 2026; 2:00 p.m., ACCNX		Boston College	W 90–65	22–7 (12–6)	24 – Izoje	12 – Izoje	4 – Tied	JMA Wireless Dome (4,058); Syracuse, NY
ACC tournament
March 5, 2026*; 5:00 p.m., ACCN	(7)	vs. (10) California; Second Round	W 70–59	23–7	23 – Izoje	10 – Izoje	4 – Darius	Gas South Arena (5,290); Duluth, GA
March 6, 2026*; 5:00 p.m., ESPN2	(7)	vs. (2) No. 12 Louisville; Quarterfinals	L 61–87	23–8	22 – Izoje	9 – Tied	2 – Tied	Gas South Arena (6,572); Duluth, GA
NCAA tournament
March 21, 2026*; 5:30 p.m., ESPN2	(9 FW1)	vs. (8 FW1) Iowa State; First Round	W 72–63	24–8	18 – Phelia	13 – Thompson	5 – Schmitt	Harry A. Gampel Pavilion (10,244); Storrs, CT
March 23, 2026*; 6:00 p.m., ESPN	(9 FW1)	at (1 FW1) No. 1 UConn; Second Round/Rivalry	L 45–98	24–9	12 – Izoje	8 – Thompson	3 – Burrows	Harry A. Gampel Pavilion (10,244); Storrs, CT
*Non-conference game. ^{#}Rankings from AP Poll. (#) Tournament seedings in parentheses. FW1=Fort Worth 1. All times are in Eastern.

== Rankings ==
Ranking movements Legend: ██ Increase in ranking ██ Decrease in ranking — = Not ranked RV = Received votes
	Week																				
Poll	Pre	1	2	3	4	5	6	7	8	9	10	11	12	13	14	15	16	17	18	19	Final
AP	—	—	—	—	—	—	—	—	—	—	—	RV	—	RV	—	RV	RV	—	—	—	RV
Coaches	—	RV	—	—	—	—	—	—	—	—	—	—	—	—	—	—	—	—	—	—	—
