= 2023 McDonald's All-American Girls Game =

Basketball game

West	East
110	102
- Date: March 28, 2023
- Venue: Toyota Center, Houston, Texas
- MVP: JuJu Watkins & Hannah Hidalgo
- Network: ESPN

McDonald's All-American

The 2023 McDonald's All-American Girls Game was an all-star basketball game played on March 28, 2023, at Toyota Center in Houston, Texas. The game's rosters featured the best and most highly recruited high school girls graduating in the class of 2023. The game was the 21st annual version of the McDonald's All-American Game first played in 2002. The 24 players were selected from over 700 nominees by a committee of basketball experts. They were chosen not only for their on-court skills, but for their performances off the court as well.

== Rosters ==
The roster was announced on January 24, 2023. Arizona, Notre Dame, LSU, South Carolina and UConn had the most selections with two selections each.

=== Team East ===
ESPNW 100 Rank	Name	Height	Position	Hometown	High school	College choice
9	Zoe Brooks	5–8	G	Plainfield, New Jersey	St. John Vianney High School	NC State
22	Essence Cody	6–3	P	Valdosta, Georgia	Valdosta High School	Alabama
7	Aalyah Del Rosario	6–5	P	Nashville, Tennessee	The Webb School	LSU
3	Jadyn Donovan	6–0	G	Washington, D.C.	Sidwell Friends School	Duke
13	MiLaysia Fulwiley	5–6	PG	Columbia, South Carolina	Keenan High School	South Carolina
5	Hannah Hidalgo	5–6	PG	Haddonfield, New Jersey	Paul VI High School	Notre Dame
18	Riley Nelson	6–0	W	Clarksburg, Maryland	Bullis School	Maryland
10	Courtney Ogden	5–11	W	Atlanta, Georgia	The Westminster Schools	Stanford
19	Laila Reynolds	6–0	G	Brandywine, Maryland	Shabach Christian Academy	Florida
20	Emma Risch	6–1	G	Melbourne, Florida	Palm Bay Magnet High School	Notre Dame
11	Taliah Scott	5–9	G	Orange Park, Florida	St. Johns Country Day School	Arkansas
15	Ashlynn Shade	5–9	G	Noblesville, Indiana	La Lumiere School	UConn

=== Team West ===
ESPNW 100 Rank	Name	Height	Position	Hometown	High school	College choice
6	Kamorea Arnold	5–9	PG	Germantown, Wisconsin	Germantown High School	UConn
26	Sofia Bell	6–1	W	Portland, Oregon	Jesuit High School	Oregon
12	Madison Booker	6–1	W	Ridgeland, Mississippi	Germantown High School	Texas
31	Addy Brown	6–2	W	Derby, Kansas	Derby High School	Iowa State
14	Breya Cunningham	6–3	C	Chula Vista, California	La Jolla Country Day School	Arizona
24	Kymora Johnson	5–7	G	Charlottesville, Virginia	St. Anne's-Belfield School	Virginia
25	Tessa Johnson	5–10	G	Albertville, Minnesota	St. Michael-Albertville High School	South Carolina
32	Amanda Muse	6–4	P	Brentwood, California	Heritage High School	UCLA
1	JuJu Watkins	6–0	G	Los Angeles, California	Sierra Canyon School	USC
21	Jada Williams	5–6	PG	Kansas City, Missouri	La Jolla Country Day School	Arizona
2	Mikaylah Williams	6–0	W	Bossier City, Louisiana	Parkway High School	LSU
23	Sahara Williams	5–10	W	Waterloo, Iowa	West High School	Oklahoma
