= Zoe Brooks =

American basketball player (born 2005)

No. 35 – NC State Wolfpack
- Position: Guard
- League: Atlantic Coast Conference

Personal information
- Born: March 12, 2005 (age 21) Plainfield, New Jersey, U.S.
- Listed height: 5 ft 10 in (1.78 m)

Career information
- High school: St. John Vianney (Holmdel Township, New Jersey)
- College: NC State (2023–present)

Career highlights
- ACC Most Improved Player (2025); 2x First-team All-ACC (2025, 2026); ACC All-Freshman Team (2024); McDonald's All-American (2023); Nike Hoop Summit (2023)

Zoe Brooks (born March 12, 2005) is an American college basketball player for the NC State Wolfpack of the Atlantic Coast Conference (ACC).

== High school career ==
Raised in Plainfield, New Jersey, Brooks played basketball at Trenton Catholic Academy and transferred after her sophomore season to St. John Vianney in Holmdel Township, New Jersey. As a junior, her team won the state Tournament of Champions. Brooks won with Sabrina Ionescu in the Skills Challenge at the 2022 WNBA All-Star Game. In her senior year, Brooks was selected to play in the McDonald's All-American Game and the Nike Hoop Summit. Rated a five-star recruit and the number 9 player in her class by ESPN, she committed to play college basketball for NC State.

== College career ==
In her freshman year, Brooks primarily came off the bench, averaging 9 points, 3.8 rebounds, and 3.4 assists. On December 10, 2023, in her first career start, Brooks recorded the second triple-double in program history against Liberty. She scored 14 points, 12 rebounds, and 10 assists, and subsequently earned USBWA and ACC Freshman of the Week. On January 11, 2024, she scored a career-high 19 points and had four steals in a win against Virginia. Brooks led the team in total assists, and was named to the ACC All-Freshman Team.

As a sophomore, Brooks averaged 14.2 points, 4.7 rebounds, and 3.7 assists. On February, 23 2025, she scored a double-double with a career-high 33 points and 10 rebounds to upset Notre Dame in double-overtime, earning ACC Player of the Week honors. In the ACC Tournament, Brooks averaged 12.3 points and named to the first-team All-ACC Tournament. Brooks won ACC Most Improved Player, and was also named an WBCA Honorable Mention All-American and first-team All-ACC.

== Personal life ==
Brooks is the daughter of Maurice Brooks, a basketball industry veteran. In April 2025, Brooks was invited to Kelsey Plum's Dawg Class, an Under Armour-sponsored camp to help top college athletes transition from collegiate to professional basketball.

== Career statistics ==
Legend
GP	Games played	GS	Games started	MPG	Minutes per game	FG%	Field goal percentage	3P%	3-point field goal percentage
FT%	Free throw percentage	RPG	Rebounds per game	APG	Assists per game	SPG	Steals per game	BPG	Blocks per game
TO	Turnovers per game	PPG	Points per game	**Bold**	Career high

Year	Team	GP	GS	MPG	FG%	3P%	FT%	RPG	APG	SPG	BPG	TO	PPG
2023–24	NC State	**38**	7	26.4	41.5	18.5	71.4	3.8	3.4	1.4	0.5	**1.9**	9.0
2024–25	NC State	34	**34**	31.8	**46.2**	**28.2**	75.6	**4.7**	3.7	1.3	0.5	2.1	14.2
2025–26	NC State	31	31	**32.9**	43.7	23.0	**86.8**	**4.7**	**4.3**	1.7	0.3	2.3	**16.0**
**Career**		103	72	30.2	44.0	23.4	79.0	4.4	3.8	1.5	0.5	2.1	12.8
Statistics retrieved from Sports-Reference.
