= Laura Ziegler (basketball) =

Danish basketball player (born 2002)

Personal information
- Born: 23 July 2002 (age 23) Herlev, Denmark
- Listed height: 6 ft 2 in (1.88 m)

Career information
- College: Saint Joseph's (2022–2025); Louisville (2025–2026)
- WNBA draft: 2026: undrafted
- Position: Forward

Career history
- 2026: Los Angeles Sparks

Career highlights
- First Team All-ACC (2026); 2× First Team All-Atlantic 10 (2024 2025); Big 5 Player of the Year (2025); Atlantic 10 All-Defensive Team (2024); Atlantic 10 Rookie of the Year (2023); ECAC Rookie of the Year (2023); Third Team All-Atlantic 10 (2023); Atlantic 10 All-Rookie Team (2023)
- Stats at Basketball Reference

Laura Nikoline Ziegler (born 23 July 2002) is a Danish professional basketball player who most recently played for the Los Angeles Sparks of the Women's National Basketball Association (WNBA). She played college basketball at Saint Joseph's and Louisville.

== Early life ==
Ziegler was born in Herlev, Denmark to Ronnie and Dorthe Ziegler, and has a younger brother, Mads.

== College career ==
Zielger began her college basketball at Saint Joseph's. During the 2022–23 season, in her freshman year, she appeared in 31 games, with 30 starts, and averaged 11.8 points and 8.7 rebounds while leading the team with 42 blocks. She recorded the best rebounding average since the 2012–13 season, tying the ninth-most rebounds in single-season program history (271). She also set a program record for most rebounds by a freshman. She finished sixth in the Atlantic 10 in rebounds and fifth in blocks while recording eight double-doubles on the year. Following the season she was named the Atlantic 10 and ECAC Rookie of the Year.

During the 2023–24 season, in her sophomore year, she started all 31 games, and averaged 14.3 points and 9.4 rebounds per game. Following the season she was named to the All-First Team Atlantic 10 and Atlantic 10 All-Defensive Team. During the 2024–25 season, in her junior year, she started all 34 games, and averaged 17.5 points, 10.4 rebounds, and 4.3 assists per game. She scored a career-high 43 points on 9 February 2025, against Loyola Chicago, and became the second Hawk in program history to surpass 40+ points. Her 43 points set a single-game program record for the most points in a game, surpassing the previous record of 42 set by Dale Hodges in 1990. She led the Atlantic-10 in rebounding and ranked second in the league in scoring. She became the third player in program history to record 500+ points, 200+ rebounds and 100+ assists in a single season. She ranked fifth nationally with 20 double-doubles and second in the nation with two triple doubles. Following the season she was named to the All-First Team Atlantic 10 for the second consecutive year and the Big 5 Player of the Year. She was also named a finalist for the Becky Hammon Mid-Major Player of the Year Award.

On 18 April 2025, she transferred to Louisville. During the 2025–26 season, in her senior year, she started all 37 games and averaged 11.0 points, 6.9 rebounds and 2.9 assists per game. She led the team in rebounding and doubles-doubles (5). She made her debut for Louisville on 4 November 2025, against No. 1 UConn, and recorded a double-double with 16 points and a career-high 18 rebounds. It was the most rebounds in a game by a Louisville player since Myisha Hines-Allen in 2018. Following the season she was named a first-team All-ACC honoree, and a top-ten finalist for the Katrina McClain Award.

== Professional career ==
After going undrafted in the 2026 WNBA draft, Ziegler signed a player development contract with the Los Angeles Sparks on 14 April 2026, earning the first developmental spot in franchise history. She made her WNBA debut for the Sparks on 21 June 2026 against the New York Liberty, and recorded four points, one assist and one rebound in 10 minutes. On 5 July 2026, she was waived by the Sparks.
