= Kymora Johnson =

American basketball player

No. 21 – Virginia Cavaliers
- Position: Guard
- League: Atlantic Coast Conference

Personal information
- Listed height: 5 ft 7 in (1.70 m)

Career information
- High school: St. Anne's-Belfield School (Charlottesville, Virginia)
- College: Virginia (2023–present)

Career highlights
- 2× First-team All-ACC (2025, 2026); Second-team All-ACC (2024); ACC All-Freshman Team (2024); McDonald's All-American (2023)

Kymora Johnson is an American college basketball player for the Virginia Cavaliers of the Atlantic Coast Conference (ACC).

== High school career ==
Johnson played basketball for St. Anne's-Belfield School. During her junior year she averaged 21.3 points, 7.7 rebounds, 6.7 assists and 4.5 steals per game, and was named the Virginia Gatorade Player of the Year. During her senior year, she averaged 22.5 points, 7.8 rebounds, 5.7 assists and 4.4 steals per game and was named the Virginia Gatorade Player of the Year for the second consecutive year.

She was considered a five-star recruit and selected to compete in the 2023 McDonald's All-American Girls Game. She won the JamFest three-point contest.

== College career ==
On September 12, 2022, Johnson committed to play college basketball at Virginia. During the 2023–24 season, in her freshman season, she started all 32 games, and led the team in scoring (15.3), assists (5.4), steals (1.8) per game, and minutes played (31:09). She set the program's freshman record with 172 assists. On February 18, 2024, against Syracuse she scored 15 points and a season-high 10 assists for her first career double-double. Following the season she was named to the second-team All-ACC and ACC all-Freshman team.

During the 2024–25 season, in her sophomore season, she started all 32 games, and averaged 17.9 points, 6.0 rebounds and 5.8 assists per game. On February 16, 2025, against Pittsburgh she recorded 20 points, 11 rebounds and career-high 11 assists for the second triple-double in program history, and the first since Dawn Staley in 1991. Following the season she was named to the first-team All-ACC.

During the 2025–26 season, in her junior season, she started all 32 games, and averaged 19.3 points, 4.6 rebounds and 5.9 assists per game. On December 20, 2025, against Winthrop she scored a career-high 41 points on 15-for-20 shooting and 10-for-13 from three-point range. Her 27 second-half points were a program record. She also added six rebounds, five assists and two steals. Her 41 points were the second-most scored in program history. She was subsequently named the ACC Player of the Week for the week ending December 22, 2025. During conference play she led the ACC with 6.28 assists per game, and ranked second with 19.5 points per game, and was named to the first-team All-ACC for the second consecutive season. During the second round of the 2026 NCAA Division I women's basketball tournament against Iowa she scored 28 points and played every minute of the double-overtime upset victory. Virginia became the first First Four team to advance to the Sweet 16 in NCAA Division I women's basketball tournament history.
