= 2025–26 Stanford Cardinal women's basketball team =

Intercollegiate basketball season

2025–26 Stanford Cardinal women's basketball

WBIT, Quarterfinals
- Conference: Atlantic Coast Conference
- Record: 21–14 (8–10 ACC)
- Head coach: Kate Paye (2nd season)
- Associate head coach: Tempie Brown (10th season)
- Assistant coaches: Katy Steding (6th season); Heather Oesterle (2nd season); Erica McCall (3rd season); Jeanette Pholen (2nd season)
- Home arena: Maples Pavilion

2025–26 ACC women's basketball standings
| | Conf. | | | | Overall |
| Team | W | | L | PCT | W | | L | PCT |
|---|---|---|---|---|---|---|---|---|
| No. 5 Duke † | 16 | – | 2 | .889 | 27 | – | 9 | .750 |
| No. 11 Louisville | 15 | – | 3 | .833 | 29 | – | 8 | .784 |
| No. 13 North Carolina | 14 | – | 4 | .778 | 28 | – | 8 | .778 |
| NC State | 13 | – | 5 | .722 | 21 | – | 11 | .656 |
| No. 9 Notre Dame | 12 | – | 6 | .667 | 25 | – | 10 | .714 |
| Virginia Tech | 12 | – | 6 | .667 | 23 | – | 10 | .697 |
| Syracuse | 12 | – | 6 | .667 | 24 | – | 9 | .727 |
| No. 19 Virginia | 11 | – | 7 | .611 | 22 | – | 12 | .647 |
| Clemson | 11 | – | 7 | .611 | 21 | – | 12 | .636 |
| California | 9 | – | 9 | .500 | 21 | – | 15 | .583 |
| Georgia Tech | 8 | – | 10 | .444 | 14 | – | 19 | .424 |
| Miami (FL) | 8 | – | 10 | .444 | 18 | – | 15 | .545 |
| Stanford | 8 | – | 10 | .444 | 21 | – | 14 | .600 |
| Florida State | 5 | – | 13 | .278 | 10 | – | 21 | .323 |
| Wake Forest | 4 | – | 14 | .222 | 14 | – | 18 | .438 |
| SMU | 2 | – | 16 | .111 | 9 | – | 21 | .300 |
| Pittsburgh | 1 | – | 17 | .056 | 8 | – | 23 | .258 |
| Boston College | 1 | – | 17 | .056 | 5 | – | 26 | .161 |
† 2026 ACC tournament winner Rankings from AP Poll

The 2025–26 Stanford Cardinal women's basketball team represented Stanford University during the 2025–26 NCAA Division I women's basketball season. The Cardinal were led by second-year head coach Kate Paye and played their home games at Maples Pavilion in Stanford, California. They competed as second-year members of the Atlantic Coast Conference.

The Cardinal began their season with a seven-game winning streak. They took their streak to Las Vegas, Nevada to participate in the Resorts World Classic. They lost the first game by four-points to Florida Gulf Coast but won the second game by two-points over Colorado State. They returned to California to host nineteenth-ranked Tennessee in an ACC–SEC Challenge rivalry game. The Cardinal lost by three-points, 62–65. Stanford opened ACC play with a victory over rivals California. They then defeated twenty-second ranked Washington and Oregon in the Invisalign Bay Area Women's Classic. They began 2026 with an ACC loss to NC State, but followed it with a victory over sixteenth-ranked North Carolina in overtime. They won two of their next three games, with the lone loss coming against Duke. Stanford then went on a stretch where the team lost eight of its next nine games. The lone victory came at Pittsburgh. The losses included a rivaly rematch against California, and the only ranked team the Cardinal played over the stretch was seventh-ranked Louisville. Stanford won its final three games of the regular season, all by double-digits.

The Cardinal finished the season 21–14 overall and 8–10 in ACC play to finish in a three-way tie for eleventh place. As the thirteenth seed in the ACC tournament, they faced twelfth seed Miami in the first round. The Cardinal lost to the Hurricanes for the second time this season, this time 76–83 in overtime. They received an at-large bid to the WBIT and were the second seed in the BYU section of the bracket. They defeated unseeded Loyola Marymount in the first round and unseeded Quinnipiac in the second round. They lost to first-seed BYU in the quarterfinals to end their season.

== Previous season ==
The Cardinal finished the season 16–15 overall and 8–10 in ACC play to finish in a tie for tenth place. As the eleventh seed in the ACC tournament, they faced fourteenth seed Clemson in the first round. The Cardinal lost to Clemson for the second time this season, this time 63–46. They received an at-large bid to the WBIT and were the second seed in the St. Joseph's section of the bracket. They lost to unseeded Portland 69–68 in overtime, in the first round to end their season.

== Offseason ==
=== Departures ===
Departures
| Name | Num. | Pos. | Height | Year | Hometown | Reason for departure |
|---|---|---|---|---|---|---|
| Elena Bosgana | 20 | G | 6'2" | Senior | Athens, Greece | Graduated |
| Brooke Demetre | 21 | F | 6'3" | Senior | Foothill Ranch, California | Graduated |
| Jzaniya Harriel | 32 | G | 5'10" | (redshirt) Junior | Sacramento, California | Graduated; transferred to SMU |
| Tess Heal | 34 | G | 5'10" | Junior | Melbourne, Australia | Transferred to Kansas State |

=== Recruiting ===
College recruiting
| Name | Hometown | School | Height | Weight | Commit date |
|---|---|---|---|---|---|
| Carly Amborn; G | Larkspur, California | San Domenico | 6 ft 2 in (1.88 m) | N/A | |
| Carly Amborn; G | Recruit ratings: ESPN: (91) | | | | |
| Alexandra Eschmeyer; F | Boulder, Colorado | Peak to Peak | 6 ft 5 in (1.96 m) | N/A | Jan 5, 2024 |
| Alexandra Eschmeyer; F | Recruit ratings: ESPN: (96) | | | | |
| Nora Ezike; F | La Grange, Illinois | Lyons Township | 6 ft 3 in (1.91 m) | N/A | Jul 1, 2024 |
| Nora Ezike; F | Recruit ratings: ESPN: (91) | | | | |
| Lara Somfai; F | Adelaide, Australia | IMG Academy | 6 ft 3 in (1.91 m) | N/A | Nov 13, 2024 |
| Lara Somfai; F | Recruit ratings: ESPN: (97) | | | | |
| Hailee Swain; G | Marietta, Georgia | Holy Innocents' | 5 ft 11 in (1.80 m) | N/A | Jul 10, 2024 |
| Hailee Swain; G | Recruit ratings: ESPN: (97) | | | | |
Overall recruit ranking:
Note: In many cases, Scout, Rivals, 247Sports, On3, and ESPN may conflict in their listings of height and weight.; In these cases, the average was taken. ESPN grades are on a 100-point scale.; Sources:

== Roster ==
2025–26 Stanford Cardinal women's basketball team
Players
Coaches

| Pos. | # | Name | Height | Year | Previous school | Hometown |
|---|---|---|---|---|---|---|
| G | 2 | Hailee Swain | 5 ft 11 in (1.8 m) | Fr | Holy Innocents' | Marietta, GA |
| F | 3 | Nunu Agara | 6 ft 2 in (1.88 m) | Jr | Hopkins | Minnetonka, MN |
| F | 4 | Alexandra Eschmeyer | 6 ft 5 in (1.96 m) | Fr | Peak to Peak | Boulder, CO |
| G | 6 | Shay Ijiwoye | 5 ft 6 in (1.68 m) | So | Desert Vista | Phoenix, AZ |
| G | 10 | Talana Lepolo | 5 ft 7 in (1.7 m) | Sr | Carondelet | Alameda, CA |
| G | 11 | Carly Amborn | 6 ft 2 in (1.88 m) | Fr | San Domenico | Larkspur, CA |
| F | 12 | Lara Somfai | 6 ft 3 in (1.91 m) | Fr | IMG Academy | Adelaide, Australia |
| G | 13 | Chloe Clardy | 5 ft 9 in (1.75 m) | Jr | Conway | Conway, AR |
| F | 15 | Harper Peterson | 6 ft 3 in (1.91 m) | So | Whitney | Rocklin, CA |
| F | 22 | Mary Ashley Stevenson | 6 ft 2 in (1.88 m) | Jr | Dalton; Purdue | New York, NY |
| G | 24 | Stavi Papadaki | 5 ft 11 in (1.8 m) | Jr | 2nd EPAL Chanion | Chania, Greece |
| F | 25 | Nora Ezike | 6 ft 2 in (1.88 m) | Fr | Lyons Township | La Grange, IL |
| G | 31 | Lauren Green | 5 ft 8 in (1.73 m) | Sr | Castro Valley | Castro Valley, CA |
| F | 40 | Courtney Ogden | 6 ft 1 in (1.85 m) | Jr | Westminster School | Atlanta, GA |
| C | 45 | Kennedy Umeh | 6 ft 4 in (1.93 m) | So | McDonogh | Columbia, MD |

Head coach

- Kate Paye (Stanford)

Assistant coach(es)

- Tempie Brown (Michigan)
- Katy Steding (Stanford)
- Heather Oesterle (Michigan)
- Erica McCall (Stanford)
- Jeanette Pholen (Stanford)

Legend

- (C) Team captain
- (S) Suspended
- (I) Ineligible
- (W) Walk-on
- Injured
- Current redshirt

Roster
Last update: October 13, 2025

== Schedule and results ==
| Date time, TV | Rank^{#} | Opponent^{#} | Result | Record | High points | High rebounds | High assists | Site (attendance) city, state |
Exhibition
| October 29, 2025*; 7:00 p.m. | | Cal State LA | W 85-50 | — | 20 – Clardy | 10 – Somfai | 3 – Tied | Maples Pavilion (1,976); Stanford, CA |
Regular season
| November 3, 2025*; 7:00 p.m., ACCNX | | UNC Greensboro | W 87–42 | 1–0 | 15 – Somfai | 10 – Stevenson | 4 – Tied | Maples Pavilion (2,068); Stanford, CA |
| November 6, 2025*; 7:00 p.m., ACCNX | | Santa Clara | W 79–58 | 2–0 | 16 – Lepolo | 13 – Somfai | 5 – Swain | Maples Pavilion (2,289); Stanford, CA |
| November 9, 2025*; 1:00 p.m., ACCNX | | Cal Poly | W 90–55 | 3–0 | 16 – Agara | 10 – Somfai | 4 – Lepolo | Maples Pavilion (2,461); Stanford, CA |
| November 14, 2025*; 4:00 p.m., ESPN+ | | at Washington State | W 54–46 | 4–0 | 10 – Swain | 8 – Agara | 3 – Tied | Beasley Coliseum (1,318); Pullman, WA |
| November 16, 2025*; 2:00 p.m., ESPN+ | | at Gonzaga | W 65–52 | 5–0 | 20 – Clardy | 11 – Agara | 4 – Swain | McCarthey Athletic Center (5,584); Spokane, WA |
| November 20, 2025*; 7:00 p.m., ACCNX | | UC Davis | W 70–45 | 6–0 | 16 – Agara | 16 – Agara | 3 – Tied | Maples Pavilion (2,228); Stanford, CA |
| November 23, 2025*; 1:00 p.m., ACCNX | | Lehigh | W 98–43 | 7–0 | 24 – Agara | 7 – Eschmeyer | 3 – Tied | Maples Pavilion (2,427); Stanford, CA |
| November 28, 2025*; 5:00 p.m., FloCollege | | vs. Florida Gulf Coast; Resorts World Classic | L 62–66 | 7–1 | 22 – Agara | 9 – Agara | 3 – Stevenson | Resorts World Arena; Las Vegas, NV |
| November 29, 2025*; 5:00 p.m., FloCollege | | vs. Colorado State; Resorts World Classic | W 62–60 | 8–1 | 18 – Agara | 16 – Somfai | 3 – Clardy | Resorts World Arena; Las Vegas, NV |
| December 3, 2025*; 6:15 p.m., ESPN2 | | No. 19 Tennessee; ACC–SEC Challenge/Rivalry | L 62–65 | 8–2 | 14 – Tied | 11 – Agara | 3 – Tied | Maples Pavilion (4,499); Stanford, CA |
| December 14, 2025; 1:00 p.m., ACCNX | | California; Rivalry | W 78–69 | 9–2 (1–0) | 25 – Ogden | 13 – Somfai | 5 – Agara | Maples Pavilion (2,957); Stanford, CA |
| December 19, 2025*; 7:00 p.m., ACCNX | | No. 22 Washington | W 67–62 | 10–2 | 14 – Somfai | 7 – Odgen | 2 – Tied | Maples Pavilion (2,533); Stanford, CA |
| December 21, 2025*; 3:00 p.m., ESPN | | vs. Oregon; Invisalign Bay Area Women's Classic | W 64–53 | 11–2 | 20 – Ogden | 11 – Tied | 5 – Clardy | Chase Center (6,258); San Francisco, CA |
| December 28, 2025*; 1:00 p.m., ACCNX | | Cornell | W 82–50 | 12–2 | 19 – Agara | 18 – Somfai | 4 – Ogden | Maples Pavilion (3,397); Stanford, CA |
| January 1, 2026; 11:00 a.m., ACCN | | at NC State | L 46–74 | 12–3 (1–1) | 16 – Agara | 16 – Somfai | 2 – Ijiwoye | Reynolds Coliseum (5,500); Raleigh, NC |
| January 4, 2026; 10:00 a.m., ESPN | | at No. 16 North Carolina | W 77–71 ^{OT} | 13–3 (2–1) | 21 – Ogden | 9 – Clardy | 7 – Lepolo | Carmichael Arena (3,076); Chapel Hill, NC |
| January 8, 2026; 7:00 p.m., ACCNX | | Wake Forest | W 55–43 | 14–3 (3–1) | 27 – Agara | 11 – Eschmeyer | 3 – Tied | Maples Pavilion (2,475); Stanford, CA |
| January 11, 2026; 2:00 p.m., ESPN | | Duke | L 60–67 | 14–4 (3–2) | 17 – Agara | 10 – Agara | 4 – Lepolo | Maples Pavilion (3,908); Stanford, CA |
| January 15, 2026; 3:00 p.m., ACCNX | | at Boston College | W 77–52 | 15–4 (4–2) | 15 – Swain | 9 – Ogden | 6 – Ogden | Conte Forum (633); Chestnut Hill, MA |
| January 18, 2026; 11:00 a.m., ACCNX | | at Syracuse | L 58–69 | 15–5 (4–3) | 17 – Somfai | 13 – Agara | 4 – Clardy | JMA Wireless Dome (3,225); Syracuse, NY |
| January 25, 2026; 3:00 p.m., ACCN | | at California; Rivalry | L 71–78 ^{OT} | 15–6 (4–4) | 16 – Tied | 9 – Somfai | 2 – Tied | Haas Pavilion (4,519); Berkeley, CA |
| January 29, 2026; 5:00 p.m., ESPN | | No. 7 Louisville | L 66–84 | 15–7 (4–5) | 16 – Ogden | 8 – Somfai | 3 – Ijiwoye | Maples Pavilion (2,594); Stanford, CA |
| February 1, 2026; 1:00 p.m., The CW | | Notre Dame | L 66–78 | 15–8 (4–6) | 23 – Ogden | 10 – Ogden | 3 – Swain | Maples Pavilion (4,119); Stanford, CA |
| February 5, 2026; 3:00 p.m., ACCNX | | at Pittsburgh | W 86–65 | 16–8 (5–6) | 26 – Clardy | 23 – Somfai | 8 – Somfai | Peterson Events Center (571); Pittsburgh, PA |
| February 8, 2026; 11:00 a.m., ACCNX | | at Georgia Tech | L 52–74 | 16–9 (5–7) | 19 – Somfai | 9 – Somfai | 6 – Somfai | McCamish Pavilion (3,056); Atlanta, GA |
| February 12, 2026; 7:00 p.m., ACCNX | | Virginia Tech | L 67–79 | 16–10 (5–8) | 20 – Clardy | 15 – Somfai | 2 – Tied | Maples Pavilion (2,503); Stanford, CA |
| February 15, 2026; 11:00 a.m., The CW | | Virginia | L 69–75 | 16–11 (5–9) | 21 – Agara | 6 – Swain | 3 – Odgen | Maples Pavilion (3,358); Stanford, CA |
| February 19, 2026; 5:00 p.m., ACCN | | at Miami (FL) | L 51–66 | 16–12 (5–10) | 16 – Swain | 10 – Somfai | 2 – Tied | Watsco Center (833); Coral Gables, FL |
| February 22, 2026; 11:00 a.m., ACCN | | at Florida State | W 77–61 | 17–12 (6–10) | 22 – Agara | 14 – Agara | 6 – Ogden | Donald Tucker Center (1,686); Tallahassee, FL |
| February 26, 2026; 7:00 p.m., ACCNX | | SMU | W 87–57 | 18–12 (7–10) | 19 – Somfai | 9 – Agara | 3 – Ogden | Maples Pavilion (2,769); Stanford, CA |
| March 1, 2026; 11:00 a.m., The CW | | Clemson | W 85–50 | 19–12 (8–10) | 24 – Agara | 10 – Agara | 6 – Somfai | Maples Pavilion (3,034); Stanford, CA |
ACC Women's Tournament
| March 4, 2026*; 8:00 a.m., ACCN | (13) | vs. (12) Miami (FL); First Round | L 76–83 ^{OT} | 19–13 | 22 – Ogden | 8 – Agara | 6 – Ogden | Gas South Arena (5,192); Duluth, GA |
WBIT
| March 19, 2026*; 7:00 p.m., ESPN+ | (2) | Loyola Marymount; First Round | W 80–76 | 20–13 | 26 – Agara | 16 – Agara | 4 – Swain | Maples Pavilion (944); Stanford, CA |
| March 22, 2026*; 2:00 p.m., ESPN+ | (2) | Quinnipiac; Second Round | W 81–69 | 21–13 | 18 – Tied | 9 – Stevenson | 4 – Agara | Maples Pavilion (874); Stanford, CA |
| March 26, 2026*; 6:00 p.m., ESPN+ | (2) | at (1) BYU; Quarterfinals | L 61–76 | 21–14 | 26 – Ogden | 7 – Agara | 2 – Tied | Marriott Center (3,541); Provo, UT |
*Non-conference game. ^{#}Rankings from AP poll. (#) Tournament seedings in parentheses. All times are in PST.

== Rankings ==
Ranking movements Legend: ██ Increase in ranking ██ Decrease in ranking — = Not ranked RV = Received votes
| | Week | | | | | | | | | | | | | | | | | | | | |
| Poll | Pre | 1 | 2 | 3 | 4 | 5 | 6 | 7 | 8 | 9 | 10 | 11 | 12 | 13 | 14 | 15 | 16 | 17 | 18 | 19 | Final |
|---|---|---|---|---|---|---|---|---|---|---|---|---|---|---|---|---|---|---|---|---|---|
| AP | RV | RV | RV | RV | RV | RV | — | RV | RV* | RV | RV | — | — | — | — | — | — | — | — | — | — |
| Coaches | RV | RV | — | RV | RV | — | — | RV | RV | RV | — | — | — | — | — | — | — | — | — | — | — |

*AP did not release a week 8 poll.
