= 2025–26 Louisville Cardinals women's basketball team =

Intercollegiate basketball season

2025–26 Louisville Cardinals women's basketball

NCAA tournament, Sweet Sixteen
- Conference: Atlantic Coast Conference

Ranking
- Coaches: No. 11
- AP: No. 11
- Record: 29–8 (15–3 ACC)
- Head coach: Jeff Walz (19th season)
- Associate head coach: Jonneshia Pineda (7th season)
- Assistant coaches: Shay Robinson (4th season); Amanda Butler (2nd season); Brittany Morris (1st season)
- Home arena: KFC Yum! Center

2025–26 ACC women's basketball standings
	Conf.				Overall
Team	W		L	PCT	W		L	PCT
No. 5 Duke †	16	–	2	.889	27	–	9	.750
No. 11 Louisville	15	–	3	.833	29	–	8	.784
No. 13 North Carolina	14	–	4	.778	28	–	8	.778
NC State	13	–	5	.722	21	–	11	.656
No. 9 Notre Dame	12	–	6	.667	25	–	10	.714
Virginia Tech	12	–	6	.667	23	–	10	.697
Syracuse	12	–	6	.667	24	–	9	.727
No. 19 Virginia	11	–	7	.611	22	–	12	.647
Clemson	11	–	7	.611	21	–	12	.636
California	9	–	9	.500	21	–	15	.583
Georgia Tech	8	–	10	.444	14	–	19	.424
Miami (FL)	8	–	10	.444	18	–	15	.545
Stanford	8	–	10	.444	21	–	14	.600
Florida State	5	–	13	.278	10	–	21	.323
Wake Forest	4	–	14	.222	14	–	18	.438
SMU	2	–	16	.111	9	–	21	.300
Pittsburgh	1	–	17	.056	8	–	23	.258
Boston College	1	–	17	.056	5	–	26	.161
† 2026 ACC tournament winner Rankings from AP Poll

The 2025–26 Louisville Cardinals women's basketball team represented the University of Louisville during the 2025–26 NCAA Division I women's basketball season. The Cardinals, led by nineteenth-year head coach Jeff Walz, played their home games at the KFC Yum! Center in Louisville, Kentucky as members of the Atlantic Coast Conference (ACC).

The Cardinals began the season as the twentieth-ranked team in the AP Poll and opened the season with a loss to UConn in the Armed Forces Classic. They went on a four-game winning streak from there, including their opening ACC match at Clemson. Their streak was broken with a ten-point rivalry loss against twentieth-ranked Kentucky. The loss saw the Cardinals fall to twenty-third in the rankings. Another three-game winning streak saw them bounce back to twenty-second in the polls before they lost their ACC–SEC Challenge game against third-ranked South Carolina. The Cardinals then went on a fourteen-game winning streak. Notable wins over the streak included a ten-point overtime victory over twelfth-ranked North Carolina, a twenty-four point victory over seventeenth-ranked Tennessee in the Women's Champions Classic, a thirteen-point victory over twenty-third ranked Notre Dame and an overtime road victory over NC State. Over the streak the team rose from twenty-second to seventh in the rankings. The Cardinals rose to sixth before facing seventeenth-ranked Duke at home. Duke prevailed by one point to break the winning streak. The Cardinals fell back to ninth in the rankings before losing two of their final three games. They defeated Georgia Tech while being upset by Virginia and Notre Dame. They would close the regular season ranked twelfth in the polls.

The Cardinals finished the regular season 25–6 overall and 15–3 in ACC play to finish in second place. As the second seed in the ACC tournament, earned a bye into the Quarterfinals where they defeated seventh-seed Syracuse 87–61. In the Semifinals, the team defeated third-seed and sixteenth-ranked North Carolina. They were unable to prevail over first seed and thirteenth-ranked Duke in the Final. They received an at-large invitation to the NCAA tournament and were the three-seed in the Fort Worth 3 region. They defeated fourteen-seed Vermont in the First Round and six-seed Alabama in the Second Round. The Cardinals were unable to advance past the Sweet Sixteen as they lost 52–71 to two-seed and ninth-ranked Michigan to end their season. The Cardinals' final record was 29–8, and they were ranked eleventh in the polls.

== Previous season ==
The Cardinals finished the season 22–11 overall and 13–5 in ACC play to finish in a three-way tie for fourth place. As the sixth seed in the ACC tournament, earned a bye into the second round where they defeated Clemson 70–68 in overtime. They lost to eleventh ranked and third seed Duke 61–48 in the Quarterfinals. They received an at-large invitation to the NCAA tournament and were the seven-seed in the Birmingham 3 region. They defeated ten seed Nebraska in the First Round before losing to second seed and sixth ranked TCU 85–70 in the Second Round to end their season.

== Off-season ==
=== Departures ===
Departures
Name	Number	Pos.	Height	Year	Hometown	Reason for departure
Izela Arenas	0	G	5'9"	Freshman	Porter Ranch, California	Transferred to Kansas State
Nyla Harris	2	F	6'2"	Junior	Windermere, Florida	Transferred to North Carolina
Eseosa Imafidon	10	C	6'5"	(redshirt) Freshman	Benin City, Nigeria	Transferred to Providence
Ja'Leah Williams	12	G	5'9"	Senior	Pompano Beach, Florida	Graduated
Merissah Russell	13	G	6'0"	Graduate Student	Ottawa, Ontario	Graduated
Jayda Curry	30	G	5'6"	Senior	Corona, California	Graduated
Olivia Cochran	44	F	6'3"	Graduate Student	Columbus, Georgia	Graduated

=== Incoming transfers ===
Incoming Transfers
Name	Number	Pos.	Height	Year	Hometown	Previous School
Laura Ziegler	0	F	6'2"	Senior	Herlev, Denmark	Saint Joseph's
Reyna Scott	1	G	5'10"	Senior	New York, New York	Oklahoma
Skylar Jones	23	G/F	6'0"	Junior	Chicago, Illinois	Arizona

=== Recruiting class ===
College recruiting
Name	Hometown	School	Height	Weight	Commit date
Peyton Bradley; G	Brandenburg, Kentucky	Meade County High School	5 ft 9 in (1.75 m)	N/A	Mar 9, 2025
Peyton Bradley; G	Recruit ratings: ESPN: (NR)				
Grace Mbugua; F	Danville, Kentucky	Danville Christian	6 ft 4 in (1.93 m)	N/A	Oct 15, 2024
Grace Mbugua; F	Recruit ratings: ESPN: (92)				
Yevheniia Putra; F	Kyiv, Ukraine	MBK Ružomberok	6 ft 3 in (1.91 m)	N/A	May 12, 2025
Yevheniia Putra; F	Recruit ratings: ESPN: (NR)				
Overall recruit ranking:
Note: In many cases, Scout, Rivals, 247Sports, On3, and ESPN may conflict in their listings of height and weight.; In these cases, the average was taken. ESPN grades are on a 100-point scale.; Sources:

== Roster ==
2025–26 Louisville Cardinals women's basketball team
Players
Coaches

Pos.	#	Name	Height	Year	Previous school	Hometown
F	0	Laura Ziegler	6 ft 2 in (1.88 m)	Sr	Falkonergaardens Gymnasium; Saint Joseph's	Herlev, Denmark
G	1	Reyna Scott	5 ft 10 in (1.78 m)	Sr	Nazareth Regional; Oklahoma	New York, NY
G	2	Imani Berry	5 ft 10 in (1.78 m)	So	Clarksville	Clarksville, TN
F	4	Mackenly Randolph	6 ft 0 in (1.83 m)	So	Sierra Canyon	Los Angeles, CA
G	5	Rebekah Graves	5 ft 6 in (1.68 m)	RS Fr	Keller	Keller, TX
F	9	Anaya Hardy	6 ft 3 in (1.91 m)	So	Renaissance	Detroit, MI
F	11	Elif İstanbulluoğlu	6 ft 3 in (1.91 m)	Jr	Fenerbahçe S.K.	Istanbul, Turkey
F	12	Yevheniia Putra	6 ft 3 in (1.91 m)	Fr	MBK Ružomberok	Kyiv, Ukraine
F	13	Isla Juffermans	6 ft 4 in (1.93 m)	So	Centre of Excellence Australia	Coffs Harbour, Australia
G	20	Peyton Bradley	5 ft 9 in (1.75 m)	Fr	Meade County	Brandenburg, KY
G	21	Reagan Bender	5 ft 10 in (1.78 m)	So	Sacred Heart	Louisville, KY
G	22	Tajianna Roberts	5 ft 10 in (1.78 m)	So	IMG Academy	San Diego, CA
G/F	23	Skylar Jones	6 ft 0 in (1.83 m)	So	Whitney Young; Arizona	Chicago, IL
F	24	Grace Mbugua	6 ft 4 in (1.93 m)	Fr	Danville Christian	Danville, KY

Head coach

- Jeff Walz (Northern Kentucky)

Assistant coach(es)

- Jonneshia Pineda (Georgia Southwestern State)
- Shay Robinson (Central Florida)
- Amanda Butler (Florida)
- Brittany Morris (Seton Hall)

Legend

- (C) Team captain
- (S) Suspended
- (I) Ineligible
- (W) Walk-on
- Injured
- Current redshirt

Roster
Last update: September 26, 2025

== Schedule and results ==
Date time, TV	Rank^{#}	Opponent^{#}	Result	Record	High points	High rebounds	High assists	Site (attendance) city, state
Regular season
November 4, 2025*; 5:30 p.m., ESPN	No. 20	vs. No. 1 UConn; Armed Forces Classic	L 66–79	0–1	16 – Ziegler	18 – Ziegler	3 – Scott	Alumni Hall (3,640); Annapolis, MD
November 9, 2025*; 2:00 p.m., ACCNX	No. 20	Northern Kentucky	W 89–61	1–1	23 – Roberts	11 – Ziegler	5 – Ziegler	KFC Yum! Center (7,182); Louisville, KY
November 12, 2025*; 7:00 p.m., ACCNX	No. 22	Colorado	W 74–68	2–1	21 – Jones	6 – Tied	3 – Tied	KFC Yum! Center (6,730); Louisville, KY
November 16, 2025; 3:00 p.m., ESPN2	No. 22	at Clemson	W 65–54	3–1 (1–0)	17 – Ziegler	10 – Ziegler	4 – Roberts	Littlejohn Coliseum (1,004); Clemson, SC
November 19, 2025*; 8:00 p.m., ACCN	No. 21	Morehead State	W 96–49	4–1	13 – Tied	13 – Hardy	4 – Tied	KFC Yum! Center (6,620); Louisville, KY
November 22, 2025*; 2:00 p.m., The CW	No. 21	No. 20 Kentucky; Rivalry	L 62–72	4–2	22 – Roberts	11 – Ziegler	4 – Berry	KFC Yum! Center (10,442); Louisville, KY
November 28, 2025*; 7:00 p.m., ACCNX	No. 23	Eastern Illinois	W 91–38	5–2	13 – Roberts	12 – Hardy	5 – Ziegler	KFC Yum! Center (6,890); Louisville, KY
November 29, 2025*; 3:30 p.m., ESPN+	No. 23	vs. East Tennessee State	W 88–50	6–2	17 – Berry	6 – Tied	7 – Ziegler	Knights Hall (553); Louisville, KY
November 30, 2025*; 2:00 p.m., ACCNX	No. 23	Bellarmine	W 100–37	7–2	14 – Berry	10 – Hardy	4 – Tied	KFC Yum! Center (6,942); Louisville, KY
December 4, 2025*; 7:00 p.m., ESPN	No. 22	No. 3 South Carolina; ACC–SEC Challenge	L 77–79	7–3	20 – Roberts	9 – Istanbulluoglu	4 – Scott	KFC Yum! Center (10,012); Louisville, KY
December 7, 2025*; 12:00 p.m., ACCNX	No. 22	New Hampshire	W 94–43	8–3	15 – Tied	9 – Hardy	5 – Roberts	KFC Yum! Center (6,653); Louisville, KY
December 10, 2025*; 9:00 p.m., ACCNX	No. 22	Ball State	W 93–62	9–3	20 – Jones	10 – Hardy	3 – Tied	KFC Yum! Center (6,477); Louisville, KY
December 14, 2025; 4:00 p.m., ACCN	No. 22	at No. 12 North Carolina	W 76–66 ^{OT}	10–3 (2–0)	17 – Ziegler	8 – Ziegler	4 – Tied	Carmichael Arena (2,622); Chapel Hill, NC
December 17, 2025*; 6:00 p.m., ACCN	No. 16	Eastern Kentucky	W 76–51	11–3	12 – Roberts	10 – Mbugua	7 – Berry	KFC Yum! Center (6,682); Louisville, KY
December 20, 2025*; 10:30 a.m., FOX	No. 16	vs. No. 17 Tennessee; Women's Champions Classic	W 89–65	12–3	18 – Roberts	14 – Istanbulluoglu	6 – Ziegler	Barclays Center (10,107); Brooklyn, NY
January 1, 2026; 2:00 p.m., ACCNX	No. 13	SMU	W 91–58	13–3 (3–0)	15 – Roberts	9 – Berry	5 – Roberts	KFC Yum! Center (7,191); Louisville, KY
January 4, 2026; 4:00 p.m., ACCN	No. 13	Virginia Tech	W 85–60	14–3 (4–0)	18 – Ziegler	9 – Ziegler	5 – Jones	KFC Yum! Center (9,594); Louisville, KY
January 8, 2026; 7:00 p.m., ACCNX	No. 10	at Miami (FL)	W 77–68	15–3 (5–0)	23 – Istanbulluoglu	9 – Ziegler	7 – Roberts	Watsco Center (606); Coral Gables, FL
January 11, 2026; 2:00 p.m., The CW	No. 10	Pittsburgh	W 86–46	16–3 (6–0)	16 – Hardy	10 – Mbugua	5 – Scott	KFC Yum! Center (8,220); Louisville, KY
January 15, 2026; 6:00 p.m., ACCN	No. 9	at No. 23 Notre Dame	W 79–66	17–3 (7–0)	20 – Scott	8 – Ziegler	3 – Tied	Purcell Pavilion (6,499); Notre Dame, IN
January 18, 2026; 1:00 p.m., ESPN2	No. 9	at NC State	W 88–80 ^{OT}	18–3 (8–0)	33 – Berry	12 – Berry	5 – Scott	Reynolds Coliseum (5,500); Raleigh, NC
January 24, 2026; 11:00 a.m., ACCNX	No. 8	Boston College	W 85–56	19–3 (9–0)	13 – Randolph	8 – Tied	6 – Roberts	KFC Yum! Center (7,750); Louisville, KY
January 29, 2026; 8:00 p.m., ESPN	No. 7	at Stanford	W 84–66	20–3 (10–0)	22 – Ziegler	11 – Ziegler	4 – Roberts	Maples Pavilion (2,594); Stanford, CA
February 1, 2026; 2:00 p.m., The CW	No. 7	at California	W 71–59	21–3 (11–0)	21 – Roberts	7 – Istanbulluoglu	5 – Tied	Haas Pavilion (2,303); Berkeley, CA
February 5, 2026; 7:00 p.m., ESPN	No. 6	No. 17 Duke	L 58–59	21–4 (11–1)	13 – Istanbulluoglu	8 – Ziegler	3 – Tied	KFC Yum! Center (10,553); Louisville, KY
February 8, 2026; 12:00 p.m., ACCNX	No. 6	at Syracuse	W 84–65	22–4 (12–1)	22 – Ziegler	8 – Randolph	5 – Tied	JMA Wireless Dome (3,617); Syracuse, NY
February 12, 2026; 7:00 p.m., ACCNX	No. 9	Wake Forest	W 86–67	23–4 (13–1)	13 – Ziegler	6 – Scott	8 – Scott	KFC Yum! Center (7,436); Louisville, KY
February 15, 2026; 6:00 p.m., ACCN	No. 9	Florida State	W 88–65	24–4 (14–1)	14 – Ziegler	8 – Ziegler	7 – Ziegler	KFC Yum! Center (8,106); Louisville, KY
February 22, 2026; 12:00 p.m., The CW	No. 8	Virginia	L 72–74	24–5 (14–2)	20 – Istanbulluoglu	12 – Ziegler	7 – Ziegler	KFC Yum! Center (8,984); Louisville, KY
February 26, 2026; 6:00 p.m., ACCN	No. 10	at Georgia Tech	W 69–50	25–5 (15–2)	18 – Istanbulluoglu	6 – Jones	4 – Scott	McCamish Pavilion (2,188); Atlanta, GA
March 1, 2026; 4:00 p.m., ESPN2	No. 10	Notre Dame	L 62–65	25–6 (15–3)	15 – Randolph	11 – Randolph	5 – Istanbulluoglu	KFC Yum! Center (11,605); Louisville, KY
ACC tournament
March 6, 2026*; 5:00 p.m., ESPN2	(2) No. 12	vs. (7) Syracuse; Quarterfinals	W 87–61	26–6	17 – Roberts	10 – Randolph	5 – Tied	Gas South Arena (6,572); Duluth, GA
March 7, 2026*; 2:30 p.m., ESPN2	(2) No. 12	vs. (3) No. 16 North Carolina; Semifinals	W 65–57	27–6	22 – Berry	10 – Berry	4 – Istanbulluoglu	Gas South Arena (6,604); Duluth, GA
March 8, 2026*; 1:00 p.m., ESPN	(2) No. 12	vs. (1) No. 13 Duke; Championship	L 65–70 ^{OT}	27–7	17 – Randolph	11 – Randolph	6 – Randolph	Gas South Arena (6,592); Duluth, GA
NCAA tournament
March 21, 2026*; 12:00 p.m., ESPN	(3 FW3) No. 13	(14 FW3) Vermont; First Round	W 72–52	28–7	20 – Randolph	11 – Randolph	4 – Roberts	KFC Yum! Center (5,895); Louisville, KY
March 23, 2026*; 12:00 p.m., ESPN	(3 FW3) No. 13	(6 FW3) Alabama; Second Round	W 69–68	29–7	18 – Tied	13 – Randolph	5 – Scott	KFC Yum! Center (5,734); Louisville, KY
March 28, 2026*; 12:30 p.m., ABC	(3 FW3) No. 13	vs. (2 FW3) No. 9 Michigan; Sweet Sixteen	L 52–71	29–8	18 – Istanbulluoglu	8 – Ziegler	4 – Tied	Dickies Arena (11,197); Fort Worth, TX
*Non-conference game. ^{#}Rankings from AP Poll. (#) Tournament seedings in parentheses. FW3=Fort Worth 3. All times are in Eastern.

== Rankings ==
Ranking movements Legend: ██ Increase in ranking ██ Decrease in ranking т = Tied with team above or below
	Week																				
Poll	Pre	1	2	3	4	5	6	7	8	9	10	11	12	13	14	15	16	17	18	19	Final
AP	20	22	21	23	22	22	16	13	13*	10	9	8	7	6	9	8	10	12	13	13	11
Coaches	19	21	19	22	21	20	17	13	13	11	10	7т	7	6	9	8	11	12	14	14	11

*AP did not release a week 8 poll.
