= 2026 ACC women's basketball tournament =

American college basketball competition

- Classification: Division I
- Season: 2025–26
- Teams: 15
- Site: Gas South Arena; Duluth, Georgia
- Champions: Duke (10th title)
- Winning coach: Kara Lawson (2nd title)
- MVP: Taina Mair (Duke)
- Attendance: 44,686
- Television: ESPN, ESPN2, ACCN

2025–26 ACC women's basketball standings
	Conf.				Overall
Team	W		L	PCT	W		L	PCT
No. 5 Duke †	16	–	2	.889	27	–	9	.750
No. 11 Louisville	15	–	3	.833	29	–	8	.784
No. 13 North Carolina	14	–	4	.778	28	–	8	.778
NC State	13	–	5	.722	21	–	11	.656
No. 9 Notre Dame	12	–	6	.667	25	–	10	.714
Virginia Tech	12	–	6	.667	23	–	10	.697
Syracuse	12	–	6	.667	24	–	9	.727
No. 19 Virginia	11	–	7	.611	22	–	12	.647
Clemson	11	–	7	.611	21	–	12	.636
California	9	–	9	.500	21	–	15	.583
Georgia Tech	8	–	10	.444	14	–	19	.424
Miami (FL)	8	–	10	.444	18	–	15	.545
Stanford	8	–	10	.444	21	–	14	.600
Florida State	5	–	13	.278	10	–	21	.323
Wake Forest	4	–	14	.222	14	–	18	.438
SMU	2	–	16	.111	9	–	21	.300
Pittsburgh	1	–	17	.056	8	–	23	.258
Boston College	1	–	17	.056	5	–	26	.161
† 2026 ACC tournament winner Rankings from AP Poll

The 2026 ACC women's basketball tournament was the postseason women's basketball tournament for the Atlantic Coast Conference and was held at the Gas South Arena in Duluth, Georgia, from March 4 to 8, 2026. It was the first time in the tournament's 27 year history that the tournament was held in Georgia. The tournament was sponsored by Ally Financial, and was officially known as the 2026 Ally ACC women's basketball tournament.

Defending champions No. 1 Duke defeated No. 2 Louisville in overtime 70–65 in the championship game, successfully defending their title after entering the tournament as the top-seed. They defeated No. 9 Clemson, No. 5 and Notre Dame before the Cardinals on their way to their tenth overall tournament title.

== Seeding and qualification ==
Fifteen of the eighteen ACC women's basketball teams will participate in the tournament. Teams were seeded by record within the conference, with a tiebreaker system to seed teams with identical conference records. The seeds were determined on March 1, after the final regular season conference games.

Seed	School	ACC Record	Tiebreakers
1	Duke #‡	16–2	
2	Louisville ‡	15–3	
3	North Carolina ‡	14–4	
4	NC State ‡	13–5	
5	Notre Dame †	12–6	2–0 vs. Virginia Tech/Syracuse
6	Virginia Tech †	12–6	1–1 vs. Notre Dame/Syracuse
7	Syracuse †	12–6	0–2 vs. Notre Dame/Virginia Tech
8	Virginia †	11–7	1–0 vs. Clemson
9	Clemson †	11–7	0–1 vs. Virginia
10	California	9–9	
11	Georgia Tech	8–10	2–0 vs. Miami/Stanford
12	Miami	8–10	1–1 vs. Georgia Tech/Stanford
13	Stanford	8–10	0–2 vs. Georgia Tech/Miami
14	Florida State	5–13	
15	Wake Forest	4–14	
DNQ	SMU	2–16	
DNQ	Pittsburgh	1–17	1–0 vs. Boston College
DNQ	Boston College	1–17	0–1 vs. Pittsburgh
# – ACC regular season champions, and tournament No. 1 seed. ‡ – Received a double-bye in the conference tournament. † – Received a single-bye in the conference tournament. Overall records include all games played in the ACC Tournament.

== Schedule ==
Session	Game	Time	Matchup	Score	Television	Attendance
First round – Wednesday, March 4
Opening day	1	11:00 a.m.	No. 12 Miami vs. No. 13 Stanford	83−76^{OT}	ACCN	5,192
Opening day	2	1:40 p.m.	No. 10 California vs. No. 15 Wake Forest	75−52	ACCN	5,192
Opening day	3	4:00 p.m.	No. 11 Georgia Tech vs. No. 14 Florida State	72−60	ACCN	5,192
Second round – Thursday, March 5
1	4	11:00 a.m.	No. 8 Virginia vs. No. 9 Clemson	50−63	ACCN	6,203
1	5	1:30 p.m.	No. 5 Notre Dame vs. No. 12 Miami	69−54	ACCN	6,203
2	6	5:00 p.m.	No. 7 Syracuse vs. No. 10 California	70–59	ACCN	5,290
2	7	7:30 p.m.	No. 6 Virginia Tech vs. No. 11 Georgia Tech	62–54	ACCN	5,290
Quarterfinals – Friday, March 6
3	8	11:00 a.m.	No. 1 Duke vs. No. 9 Clemson	60−46	ESPN2	8,233
3	9	1:30 p.m.	No. 4 NC State vs. No. 5 Notre Dame	63−81	ACCN	8,233
4	10	5:00 p.m.	No. 2 Louisville vs. No. 7 Syracuse	87−61	ESPN2	6,572
4	11	7:30 p.m.	No. 3 North Carolina vs. No. 6 Virginia Tech	85−68	ACCN	6,572
Semifinals – Saturday, March 7
5	12	12:00 p.m.	No. 1 Duke vs. No. 5 Notre Dame	65−63	ESPN2	6,604
5	13	2:30 p.m.	No. 2 Louisville vs. No. 3 North Carolina	65–57	ESPN2	6,604
Championship – Sunday, March 8
6	14	1:00 p.m.	No. 1 Duke vs. No. 2 Louisville	70−65^{OT}	ESPN	6,592
Game times in EST through the semifinals and EDT for the championship. Rankings denote tournament seed.

== Bracket ==
First round Wednesday, March 4
12	Miami	83*
13	Stanford	76
10	California	75
15	Wake Forest	52
11	Georgia Tech	72
14	Florida State	60

Second round Thursday, March 5
8	Virginia	50
9	Clemson	63
5	Notre Dame	69
12	Miami	54
7	Syracuse	70
10	California	59
6	Virginia Tech	62
11	Georgia Tech	54

Quarterfinals; Friday, March 6
1	13 Duke	60
9	Clemson	46
4	NC State	63
5	Notre Dame	81
2	12 Louisville	87
7	Syracuse	61
3	16 North Carolina	85
6	Virginia Tech	68

Semifinals; Saturday, March 7
1	13 Duke	65
5	Notre Dame	63
2	12 Louisville	65
3	16 North Carolina	57

Championship; Sunday, March 8
1	13 Duke	70*
2	12 Louisville	65

* denotes overtime period

== Game summaries ==
=== First round ===
ACCN

March 4
11:00 a.m. EST

Report

(12) Miami (FL) 83, (13) Stanford 76 (OT)
Scoring by quarter: 19−10, 18−29, 28−13, 5−18, Overtime: 13−6
Pts: Kyle (25); Rebs: Kyle (11); Asts: Raviv (6)	Pts: Ogden (22); Rebs: Agara (8); Asts: Ogden (6)

Gas South Arena
Duluth, GA
Referees: Maj Forsberg
Tiara Cruse
Talisa Green

ACCN

March 4
1:40 p.m. EST

Report

(10) California 75, (15) Wake Forest 52
Scoring by quarter: 11–10, 21–11, 29–12, 14–19
Pts: Walker (17); Rebs: Walker (10); Asts: Maul (4)	Pts: Carter (13); Rebs: Brown (9); Asts: Oliver, Sørbye (3)

Gas South Arena
Duluth, GA
Referees: Angelica Suffren
Karen Preato
Mark Resch

ACCN

March 4
4:00 p.m. EST

Report

(11) Georgia Tech 72, (14) Florida State 60
Scoring by quarter: 22–16, 17–13, 17–19, 16–12
Pts: Foster (18); Rebs: Turnage (9); Asts: Walker (3)	Pts: Bowles (16); Rebs: Greene (8); Asts: Williams (4)

Gas South Arena
Duluth, GA
Attendance: 5,192
Referees: Kate Lukanich
Fatou Cissoko-Stephens
Ed Sidlasky

=== Second round ===
ACCN

March 5
11:00 a.m. EST

Report

(8) Virginia 50, (9) Clemson 63
Scoring by quarter: 14–15, 12–13, 13–15, 11–18
Pts: Clark (15); Rebs: Smith (11); Asts: Johnson, Smith (3)	Pts: Moore (19); Rebs: Thompson (11); Asts: Rose (5)

Gas South Arena
Duluth, GA
Referees: Maj Forsberg
Denise Brooks
Mark Resch

ACCN

March 5
1:30 p.m. EST

Report

(5) Notre Dame 69, (12) Miami (FL) 54
Scoring by quarter: 23–19, 14–4, 21–17, 11–14
Pts: Hidalgo (28); Rebs: Cowles (12); Asts: Hidalgo (5)	Pts: Raviv (15); Rebs: Kyle (15); Asts: Adams (4)

Gas South Arena
Duluth, GA
Attendance: 6,203
Referees: Angelica Suffren
Katie Lukanich
Teresa Stuck

ACCN

March 5
5:00 p.m. EST

Report

(7) Syracuse 70, (10) California 59
Scoring by quarter: 23–7, 14–9, 13–24, 20–19
Pts: Izoje (23); Rebs: Izoje (10); Asts: Darius (4)	Pts: Walker (19); Rebs: Maul (9); Asts: Maul, Morris, Twidale (3)

Gas South Arena
Duluth, GA
Referees: Rod Creech
Talisa Green
Tiara Cruse

ACCN

March 5
7:30 p.m. EST

Report

(6) Virginia Tech 62, (11) Georgia Tech 54
Scoring by quarter: 7–17, 22–6, 21–23, 12–8
Pts: Wenzel (15); Rebs: Nelson (9); Asts: Nelson (6)	Pts: Walker (20); Rebs: Turnage (10); Asts: Alben (3)

Gas South Arena
Duluth, GA
Attendance: 5,290
Referees: Karen Preato
Billy Smith
Saif Esho

=== Quarterfinals ===
ESPN2

March 6
11:00 a.m. EST

Report

(1) Duke 60, (9) Clemson 46
Scoring by quarter: 20–14, 18–5, 8–9, 14–18
Pts: Fournier (17); Rebs: Fournier (10); Asts: Jackson (4)	Pts: Moore (17); Rebs: Hinds (8); Asts: Rose (5)

Gas South Arena
Duluth, GA
Referees: Eric Brewton
Tiffany Bird
Meadow Overstreet

ACCN

March 6
1:30 p.m. EST

Report

(4) NC State 63, (5) Notre Dame 81
Scoring by quarter: 18–23, 14–17, 9–22, 22–19
Pts: Pierre (17); Rebs: Pierre (14); Asts: Brooks (5)	Pts: Hidalgo (25); Rebs: Moore (9); Asts: Hidalgo (5)

Gas South Arena
Duluth, GA
Attendance: 8,233
Referees: Joseph Vaszily
Denise Brooks
Saif Esho

ESPN2

March 6
5:00 p.m. EST

Report

(2) Louisville 87, (7) Syracuse 61
Scoring by quarter: 25–12, 20–21, 17–14, 25–14
Pts: Roberts (17); Rebs: Randolph (10); Asts: Berry, Scott (5)	Pts: Izoje (22); Rebs: Burrows, Izoje (9); Asts: Burrows, Cooper, Potts, Schmitt (2)

Gas South Arena
Duluth, GA
Referees: Chuck Gonzalez
Karen Preato
Billy Smith

ACCN

March 6
7:30 p.m. EST

Report

(3) North Carolina 85, (6) Virginia Tech 68
Scoring by quarter: 11–16, 29–11, 24–24, 21–17
Pts: Grant (21); Rebs: Harris (10); Asts: Aarnisalo (6)	Pts: Wenzel (26); Rebs: Baker (8); Asts: Nelson (6)

Gas South Arena
Duluth, GA
Attendance: 6,572
Referees: Pualani Spurlock-Welsh
Rod Creech
Teresa Stuck

=== Semifinals ===
ESPN2

March 7
12:00 p.m. EST

Report

(1) Duke 65, (5) Notre Dame 63
Scoring by quarter: 17–11, 21–20, 8–18, 19–14
Pts: Mair (16); Rebs: Thomas (10); Asts: Mair (8)	Pts: Hidalgo (24); Rebs: Hidalgo (8); Asts: Hidalgo, Moore (2)

Gas South Arena
Duluth, GA
Referees: Rod Creech
Fatou Cissoko-Stephens
Pualani Spurlock-Welsh

ESPN2

March 7
2:30 p.m. EST

Report

(2) Louisville 65, (3) North Carolina 57
Scoring by quarter: 16–10, 12–17, 17–13, 20–17
Pts: Berry (22); Rebs: Berry (10); Asts: Istanbulluoglu (4)	Pts: Aarnisalo (17); Rebs: Harris (8); Asts: Aarnisalo (5)

Gas South Arena
Duluth, GA
Attendance: 6,604
Referees: Joseph Vaszily
Tiffany Bird
Tiara Cruse

=== Final ===
ESPN

March 8
1:00 p.m. EDT

Report

(1) Duke 70, (2) Louisville 65 (OT)
Scoring by quarter: 14−21, 16−11, 16−17, 14−11, Overtime: 10−5
Pts: Thomas, Mair (19); Rebs: Mair (12); Asts: Jackson (6)	Pts: Randolph (17); Rebs: Randolph (11); Asts: Randolph (6)

Gas South Arena
Duluth, GA
Attendance: 6,592
Referees: Maj Forsberg
Karen Preato
Katie Lukanich

== Awards and honors ==
**2026 ACC Women's Basketball All-Tournament Teams**
First Team	Second Team
**Taina Mair** – Duke; Riley Nelson – Duke; Imari Berry – Louisville; Mackenly Randolph – Louisville; Hannah Hidalgo – Notre Dame	Toby Fournier – Duke; Delaney Thomas – Duke; Ashlon Jackson – Duke; Laura Ziegler – Louisville; Uche Izoje – Syracuse

MVP in bold

== See also ==
- 2026 ACC men's basketball tournament
