= 2025–26 Virginia Tech Hokies women's basketball team =

Intercollegiate basketball season

2025–26 Virginia Tech Hokies women's basketball

NCAA tournament, First Round
- Conference: Atlantic Coast Conference
- Record: 23–10 (12–6 ACC)
- Head coach: Megan Duffy (2nd season)
- Associate head coach: Itoro Coleman (2nd season)
- Assistant coaches: Jen Hoover (2nd season); Sharnee Zoll-Norman (2nd season); Darren Guensch (1st season); Jerod McCullen (1st season)
- Home arena: Cassell Coliseum

2025–26 ACC women's basketball standings
	Conf.				Overall
Team	W		L	PCT	W		L	PCT
No. 5 Duke †	16	–	2	.889	27	–	9	.750
No. 11 Louisville	15	–	3	.833	29	–	8	.784
No. 13 North Carolina	14	–	4	.778	28	–	8	.778
NC State	13	–	5	.722	21	–	11	.656
No. 9 Notre Dame	12	–	6	.667	25	–	10	.714
Virginia Tech	12	–	6	.667	23	–	10	.697
Syracuse	12	–	6	.667	24	–	9	.727
No. 19 Virginia	11	–	7	.611	22	–	12	.647
Clemson	11	–	7	.611	21	–	12	.636
California	9	–	9	.500	21	–	15	.583
Georgia Tech	8	–	10	.444	14	–	19	.424
Miami (FL)	8	–	10	.444	18	–	15	.545
Stanford	8	–	10	.444	21	–	14	.600
Florida State	5	–	13	.278	10	–	21	.323
Wake Forest	4	–	14	.222	14	–	18	.438
SMU	2	–	16	.111	9	–	21	.300
Pittsburgh	1	–	17	.056	8	–	23	.258
Boston College	1	–	17	.056	5	–	26	.161
† 2026 ACC tournament winner Rankings from AP Poll

The 2025–26 Virginia Tech Hokies women's basketball team represented Virginia Polytechnic Institute and State University during the 2025–26 NCAA Division I women's basketball season. The Hokies were led by second-year head coach Megan Duffy and played their home games at Cassell Coliseum in Blacksburg, Virginia as members of the Atlantic Coast Conference.

The Hokies began the season by winning five straight home non-conference games before the streak was broken at James Madison. The team then travelled to Saint Thomas to participate in the Paradise Jam. The Hokies finished in third place after losing to BYU by four points but defeating Oregon State. Virginia Tech returned to Cassell Coliseum to defeat Florida in the ACC–SEC Challenge. They opened ACC play with a loss to Duke before going on a four-game winning streak. The streak included an ACC victory over Florida State and the other games were non-conference match-ups. Their winning streak was broken on the first day of 2026 by Miami in overtime. They followed the loss with a loss against thirteenth-ranked Louisville. The Hokies were 1–3 in the ACC after the loss, but went on a seven-game winning streak to reach 8–3 in league play. All of the seven games were won by double-digits and it included three road victories. The final game of the streak was a rivalry victory over Virginia by twelve points. A pair of losses against Notre Dame and NC State by ten and twenty points, respectively, broke the streak. The Hokies went 4–1 over their final five games, only losing to twenty-second ranked North Carolina in overtime. They completed a road trip to Calfiornia with two victories over this streak, and finished the regular season with a one-point victory in the rivalry re-match against Virginia.

The Hokies finished the season 23–10 overall and 12–6 in ACC play to finish in a trhee-way tie for fifth place. As the sixth seed in the ACC tournament, they earned a bye to the second round, where they defeated eleventh seed Georgia Tech. The Hokies lost to third seed and sixteenth-ranked North Carolina in the Quarterfinals. They received an at-large bid to the NCAA tournament and were the ninth seed in the Fort Worth 3 regional. They lost to eighth-seed Oregon in the first round to end their season.

== Previous season ==
The Hokies finished the season 19–13 overall and 9–9 in ACC play to finish in a tie for tenth place. As the eighth seed in the ACC tournament, they lost to ninth-seed Georgia Tech in the second round. They received an at-large bid to the WBIT and were the first seed in their section of the bracket. They defeated un-seeded North Carolina A&T before losing to also un-seeded Texas Tech 69–59 to end their season.

== Off-season ==
=== Departures ===
Departures
Name	Number	Pos.	Height	Year	Hometown	Reason for departure
Lani White	0	G	6'0"	Junior	Irvine, California	Transferred to Utah
Rose Micheaux	4	F	6'2"	Senior	Wayne, Michigan	Graduated
Matilda Ekh	11	G/F	6'2"	Senior	Västerås, Sweden	Graduated
Myah Hazelton	21	F	6'4"	Freshman	Baltimore, Maryland	Transferred to Rice
Ramiya White	22	C	6'5"	Freshman	Louisville, Kentucky	Transferred to Kansas State

=== Incoming transfers ===
Incoming transfers
Name	Number	Pos.	Height	Year	Hometown	Previous school
Kilah Freelon	0	F	6'1"	Senior	Denver, Colorado	Texas Tech
Mel Daley	21	G	5'11"	Graduate student	Hastings-on-Hudson, New York	Northwestern
Sophie Swanson	31	G	5'10"	Junior	Barrington, Illinois	Purdue

=== Recruiting class ===
College recruiting
Name	Hometown	School	Height	Weight	Commit date
Špela Brecelj; G/F	Ajdovščina, Slovenia	—	6 ft 2 in (1.88 m)	N/A	Aug 21, 2025
Špela Brecelj; G/F	Recruit ratings: 247Sports: ESPN: (NR)				
Amani Jenkins; F	Johnston, Iowa	Johnston High School	6 ft 3 in (1.91 m)	N/A	Jun 23, 2024
Amani Jenkins; F	Recruit ratings: 247Sports: ESPN: (92)				
Kate Sears; G	Boone, North Carolina	Watauga High School	5 ft 9 in (1.75 m)	N/A	May 27, 2024
Kate Sears; G	Recruit ratings: 247Sports: ESPN: (92)				
Aniya Trent; F	Springboro, Ohio	Springboro High School	6 ft 3 in (1.91 m)	N/A	Oct 7, 2024
Aniya Trent; F	Recruit ratings: 247Sports: ESPN: (NR)				
Overall recruit ranking:
Note: In many cases, Scout, Rivals, 247Sports, On3, and ESPN may conflict in their listings of height and weight.; In these cases, the average was taken. ESPN grades are on a 100-point scale.; Sources:

== Roster ==
2025–26 Virginia Tech Hokies women's basketball team
Players
Coaches

Pos.	#	Name	Height	Year	Previous school	Hometown
F	0	Kilah Freelon	6 ft 1 in (1.85 m)	Sr	Mullen; Texas Tech	Denver, CO
G	1	Carleigh Wenzel	6 ft 0 in (1.83 m)	RS Jr	Antonian College Prep	San Antonio, TX
G	2	Leila Wells	5 ft 9 in (1.75 m)	So	Chelsea	Chelsea, MI
G	3	Mackenzie Nelson	5 ft 8 in (1.73 m)	RS So	St. Luke's	Greenwich, CT
F	10	Carys Baker	6 ft 2 in (1.88 m)	Jr	Loomis Chaffee	West Hartford, CT
G/F	11	Špela Brecelj	6 ft 2 in (1.88 m)	Fr		Ajdovščina, Slovenia
G	12	Samyah Suffren	5 ft 8 in (1.73 m)	Jr	Cannon School	Charlotte, NC
G	13	Kate Sears (injured)	5 ft 9 in (1.75 m)	Fr	Watauga	Boone, NC
G	21	Melannie Daley	5 ft 11 in (1.8 m)	GS	Hastings; Northwestern	Hastings-on-Hudson, NY
F	24	Amani Jenkins	6 ft 3 in (1.91 m)	Fr	Johnston	Johnston, IA
F	30	Aniya Trent	6 ft 3 in (1.91 m)	Fr	Springboro	Springboro, OH
G	31	Sophie Swanson	5 ft 10 in (1.78 m)	Jr	Barrington Prep; Purdue	Barrington, IL
F	34	Kayl Petersen	6 ft 0 in (1.83 m)	So	Waupun	Waupun, WI

Head coach

- Megan Duffy (Notre Dame)

Assistant coach(es)

- Itoro Coleman (Clemson)
- Sharnee Zoll-Norman (Virginia)
- Jen Hoover (Wake Forest)
- Darren Guensch (Radford)
- Jerod McCullen (Central Michigan)

Legend

- (C) Team captain
- (S) Suspended
- (I) Ineligible
- (W) Walk-on
- Injured
- Current redshirt

Roster

== Schedule ==
Date time, TV	Rank^{#}	Opponent^{#}	Result	Record	High points	High rebounds	High assists	Site (attendance) city, state
Regular season
November 4, 2025*; 6:00 p.m., ACCNX		Towson	W 100–56	1–0	17 – Petersen	11 – Tied	7 – Nelson	Cassell Coliseum (4,184); Blacksburg, VA
November 9, 2025*; 2:00 p.m., ACCNX		Loyola (MD)	W 64–48	2–0	18 – Wenzel	9 – Petersen	11 – Nelson	Cassell Coliseum (4,280); Blacksburg, VA
November 13, 2025*; 6:00 p.m., ACCNX		Gardner–Webb	W 87–51	3–0	17 – Suffren	18 – Freelon	7 – Nelson	Cassell Coliseum (3,951); Blacksburg, VA
November 15, 2025*; 2:00 p.m., ACCNX		Coastal Carolina	W 82–59	4–0	23 – Wenzel	8 – Freelon	10 – Wenzel	Cassell Coliseum (4,408); Blacksburg, VA
November 20, 2025*; 6:00 p.m., ACCNX		Niagara	W 83–46	5–0	13 – Tied	6 – Freelon	7 – Nelson	Cassell Coliseum (4,099); Blacksburg, VA
November 23, 2025*; 2:00 p.m., ESPN+		at James Madison	L 56–65	5–1	20 – Wenzel	7 – Freelon	4 – Nelson	Atlantic Union Bank Center (3,320); Harrisonburg, VA
November 27, 2025*; 5:30 p.m., ESPN+		vs. BYU; Paradise Jam Island Bracket semifinals	L 60–64	5–2	18 – Wenzel	14 – Freelon	5 – Nelson	UVI Sports and Fitness Center (824); Saint Thomas, USVI
November 29, 2025*; 2:30 p.m., ESPN+		vs. Oregon State; Paradise Jam Island Bracket 3rd place game	W 78–67	6–2	24 – Daley	7 – Tied	6 – Tied	UVI Sports and Fitness Center (324); Saint Thomas, USVI
December 4, 2025*; 5:00 p.m., ESPN2		Florida; ACC–SEC Challenge	W 68–64	7–2	23 – Baker	10 – Baker	6 – Wenzel	Cassell Coliseum (4,118); Blacksburg, VA
December 7, 2025; 2:00 p.m., ACCN		at Duke	L 54–70	7–3 (0–1)	15 – Wenzel	6 – Petersen	4 – Nelson	Cameron Indoor Stadium (4,797); Durham, NC
December 10, 2025*; 6:00 p.m., ACCNX		Presbyterian	W 92–36	8–3	17 – Suffren	8 – Baker	5 – Wells	Cassell Coliseum (3,716); Blacksburg, VA
December 14, 2025*; 4:00 p.m., ACCNX		East Tennessee State	W 73–55	9–3	22 – Baker	8 – Baker	8 – Nelson	Cassell Coliseum (4,126); Blacksburg, VA
December 18, 2025; 6:00 p.m., ACCNX		at Florida State	W 79–54	10–3 (1–1)	21 – Baker	10 – Daley	12 – Nelson	Donald L. Tucker Center (1,277); Tallahassee, FL
December 21, 2025*; 12:00 p.m., ACCNX		Radford	W 79–47	11–3	23 – Baker	17 – Freelon	7 – Nelson	Cassell Coliseum (4,443); Blacksburg, VA
January 1, 2026; 6:00 p.m., ACCNX		Miami (FL)	L 67–75 ^{OT}	11–4 (1–2)	16 – Wenzel	7 – Tied	8 – Nelson	Cassell Coliseum (4,617); Blacksburg, VA
January 4, 2026; 4:00 p.m., ACCN		at No. 13 Louisville	L 60–85	11–5 (1–3)	16 – Baker	9 – Baker	5 – Suffren	KFC Yum! Center (9,594); Louisville, KY
January 8, 2026; 6:00 p.m., ACCNX		at Syracuse	W 77–57	12–5 (2–3)	18 – Wenzel	6 – Tied	5 – Tied	JMA Wireless Dome (2,318); Syracuse, NY
January 11, 2026; 12:00 p.m., ACCN		Boston College	W 78–56	13–5 (3–3)	17 – Baker	9 – Freelon	4 – Wenzel	Cassell Coliseum (4,144); Blacksburg, VA
January 15, 2026; 7:30 p.m., ACCNX		at SMU	W 79–42	14–5 (4–3)	18 – Tied	9 – Freelon	5 – Nelson	Moody Coliseum (1,191); University Park, TX
January 22, 2026; 6:00 p.m., ACCNX		Clemson	W 71–68	15–5 (5–3)	24 – Tied	9 – Freelon	3 – Nelson	Cassell Coliseum (3,992); Blacksburg, VA
January 24, 2026; 5:00 p.m., ACCNX		at Wake Forest	W 85–57	16–5 (6–3)	20 – Baker	9 – Baker	6 – Wenzel	LJVM Coliseum (1,177); Winston-Salem, NC
January 29, 2026; 6:00 p.m., ACCNX		Pittsburgh	W 67–50	17–5 (7–3)	17 – Wenzel	11 – Freelon	5 – Nelson	Cassell Coliseum (4,051); Blacksburg, VA
February 1, 2026; 2:00 p.m., ACCNX		Virginia; Rivalry	W 76–64	18–5 (8–3)	23 – Wenzel	7 – Freelon	5 – Tied	Cassell Coliseum (5,281); Blacksburg, VA
February 5, 2026; 7:00 p.m., ACCNX		at Notre Dame	L 70–80	18–6 (8–4)	21 – Baker	13 – Freelon	7 – Nelson	Purcell Pavilion (6,775); Notre Dame, IN
February 8, 2026; 12:00 p.m., ACCN		NC State	L 62–82	18–7 (8–5)	22 – Wenzel	18 – Freelon	3 – Tied	Cassell Coliseum (4,454); Blacksburg, VA
February 12, 2026; 10:00 p.m., ACCNX		at Stanford	W 79–67	19–7 (9–5)	24 – Baker	7 – Baker	7 – Nelson	Maples Pavilion (2,503); Stanford, CA
February 15, 2026; 5:00 p.m., ACCNX		at California	W 68–58	20–7 (10–5)	19 – Suffren	10 – Freelon	4 – Nelson	Haas Pavilion (2,444); Berkeley, CA
February 19, 2026; 6:00 p.m., ACCN		No. 22 North Carolina	L 63–66 ^{OT}	20–8 (10–6)	15 – Tied	10 – Freelon	4 – Nelson	Cassell Coliseum (4,271); Blacksburg, VA
February 22, 2026; 2:00 p.m., ACCNX		Georgia Tech	W 62–51	21–8 (11–6)	16 – Suffren	8 – Tied	6 – Nelson	Cassell Coliseum (4,803); Blacksburg, VA
March 1, 2026; 12:00 p.m., ACCN		at Virginia; Rivalry	W 83–82	22–8 (12–6)	29 – Wenzel	7 – Baker	11 – Nelson	John Paul Jones Arena (5,125); Charlottesville, VA
ACC tournament
March 5, 2026*; 7:30 p.m., ACCN	(6)	vs. (11) Georgia Tech; Second Round	W 62–54	23–8	15 – Wenzel	9 – Nelson	6 – Nelson	Gas South Arena (5,290); Duluth, GA
March 6, 2026*; 7:30 p.m., ACCN	(6)	vs. (3) No. 16 North Carolina; Quarterfinals	L 68–85	23–9	26 – Wenzel	8 – Baker	6 – Nelson	Gas South Arena (6,572); Duluth, GA
NCAA tournament
March 20, 2026*; 1:30 p.m., ESPN2	(9 FW3)	vs. (8 FW3) Oregon; First Round	L 60–70	23–10	21 – Baker	14 – Baker	6 – Nelson	Moody Center (7,938); Austin, TX
*Non-conference game. ^{#}Rankings from AP Poll. (#) Tournament seedings in parentheses. FW3=Fort Worth 3. All times are in Eastern.

== Rankings ==
Ranking movements Legend: ██ Increase in ranking ██ Decrease in ranking — = Not ranked RV = Received votes
	Week																				
Poll	Pre	1	2	3	4	5	6	7	8	9	10	11	12	13	14	15	16	17	18	19	Final
AP	—	—	—	—	—	—	—	—	—	—	—	—	—	—							
Coaches	—	—	—	—	—	—	—	—	—	—	—	—	—	RV							
