= 2025–26 Miami Hurricanes women's basketball team =

Intercollegiate basketball season

2025–26 Miami Hurricanes women's basketball

WBIT, Second Round
- Conference: Atlantic Coast Conference
- Record: 18–15 (8–10 ACC)
- Head coach: Tricia Cullop (2nd season)
- Associate head coach: Fitzroy Anthony; Jessie Ivey (11th 2nd season)
- Assistant coaches: Danielle Page (2nd season); Murriel Page (2nd season)
- Home arena: Watsco Center

2025–26 ACC women's basketball standings
| | Conf. | | | | Overall |
| Team | W | | L | PCT | W | | L | PCT |
|---|---|---|---|---|---|---|---|---|
| No. 5 Duke † | 16 | – | 2 | .889 | 27 | – | 9 | .750 |
| No. 11 Louisville | 15 | – | 3 | .833 | 29 | – | 8 | .784 |
| No. 13 North Carolina | 14 | – | 4 | .778 | 28 | – | 8 | .778 |
| NC State | 13 | – | 5 | .722 | 21 | – | 11 | .656 |
| No. 9 Notre Dame | 12 | – | 6 | .667 | 25 | – | 10 | .714 |
| Virginia Tech | 12 | – | 6 | .667 | 23 | – | 10 | .697 |
| Syracuse | 12 | – | 6 | .667 | 24 | – | 9 | .727 |
| No. 19 Virginia | 11 | – | 7 | .611 | 22 | – | 12 | .647 |
| Clemson | 11 | – | 7 | .611 | 21 | – | 12 | .636 |
| California | 9 | – | 9 | .500 | 21 | – | 15 | .583 |
| Georgia Tech | 8 | – | 10 | .444 | 14 | – | 19 | .424 |
| Miami (FL) | 8 | – | 10 | .444 | 18 | – | 15 | .545 |
| Stanford | 8 | – | 10 | .444 | 21 | – | 14 | .600 |
| Florida State | 5 | – | 13 | .278 | 10 | – | 21 | .323 |
| Wake Forest | 4 | – | 14 | .222 | 14 | – | 18 | .438 |
| SMU | 2 | – | 16 | .111 | 9 | – | 21 | .300 |
| Pittsburgh | 1 | – | 17 | .056 | 8 | – | 23 | .258 |
| Boston College | 1 | – | 17 | .056 | 5 | – | 26 | .161 |
† 2026 ACC tournament winner Rankings from AP Poll

The 2025–26 Miami Hurricanes women's basketball team represents the University of Miami during the 2025–26 NCAA Division I women's basketball season. The Hurricanes are led by second-year head coach Tricia Cullop and play their home games at the Watsco Center in Coral Gables, Florida as members of the Atlantic Coast Conference (ACC).

The Hurricanes began the season with a three-game winning streak before traveling to Orlando, Florida to participate in the WBCA Showcase. There they defeated Davidson before losing to nineteenth-ranked Iowa. Miami then traveled to the Cayman Islands to participate in the Cayman Islands Classic. They again went 1–1, defeating George Washington before losing to twenty-fourth ranked Oklahoma State by three points. They returned to Florida to face seventeeth-ranked Kentucky in the ACC–SEC Challenge, which they lost 48–64. The Hurricanes went 5–1 over their next six games, with the only loss coming in their ACC opener against NC State. They won two other ACC games, a three-point victory over Wake Forest and an eight-point win over Virginia Tech. The team then went on a tough run, winning only one of their next five games. The victory was over rivals Florida State. They played one ranked team over the stretch, tenth-ranked Louisville. Miami went on another 1–4 run over their next five games, only defeating SMU. They again only played one ranked team over the stretch, a loss against twentieth-ranked Duke. They also lost a rivalry rematch against Florida State. The Hurricanes finished the regular season strong, winning four of their final five games. The only loss was on the final day of the regular season, against Georgia Tech.

The Hurricanes finished the season 18–15 and 8–10 in ACC play to finish in a three-way tie for eleventh place. As the twelfth seed in the 2026 ACC tournament, they defeated thirteenth seed Stanford 83–76 in overtime in the First Round. They lost to fifth-seed Notre Dame in the Second Round. They received an at-large invitation to the WBIT, where they were the second seed in the Utah section. They defeated Georgia Southern in the First Round before losing to third seed Wisconsin in the Second Round to end their season.

== Previous season ==
The Hurricanes finished the season 14–15 and 4–14 in ACC play to finish in sixteenth place. Under the new ACC tournament rules, they did not qualify for the 2025 ACC tournament. They were not invited to the NCAA tournament or the WBIT.

== Off-season ==
=== Departures ===
Departures
| Name | Number | Pos. | Height | Year | Hometown | Reason for departure |
|---|---|---|---|---|---|---|
| Aurora Almón | 0 | F | 6'4" | Freshman | Santo Domingo, Dominican Republic | Transferred to Syracuse |
| Lemyah Hylton | 1 | G | 5'11" | Junior | London, Ontario | Transferred to Texas A&M |
| Jasmyne Roberts | 4 | G | 5'10" | Senior | Jacksonville, Florida | Graduated |
| Darrione Rogers | 8 | G | 5'11" | Graduate Student | Chicago, Illinois | Graduated |
| Haley Cavinder | 14 | G | 5'6" | Graduate Student | Gilbert, Arizona | Graduated signed to WWE |
| Hanna Cavinder | 15 | G | 5'6" | Graduate Student | Gilbert, Arizona | Graduated signed to WWE |
| Daniela Abies | 16 | F | 6'0" | (redshirt) Junior | Málaga, Spain | Transferred to St. John's |
| Natalija Marshall | 21 | F | 6'5" | Graduate Student | Queens, New York | Graduated |
| Leah Harmon | 42 | G | 5'6" | Freshman | Paterson, New Jersey | Transferred to UCF |
| Cameron Williams | 44 | F | 6'3" | Graduate Student | Chicago, Illinois | Graduated |
| Sophia Zulich | 54 | F | 5'11" | Graduate Student | Greater Sudbury, Ontario | Graduated |

=== Incoming transfers ===
Incoming transfers
| Name | Number | Pos. | Height | Year | Hometown | Previous school |
|---|---|---|---|---|---|---|
| Ra Shaya Kyle | 0 | C | 6'6" | Graduate Student | Marion, Indiana | Florida |
| Candace Kpetikou | 4 | C | 6'3" | (redshirt) Sophomore | Niamey, Niger | Washington State |
| Mya Kone | 8 | F | 6'2" | Junior | Pompano Beach, Florida | FIU |
| Gal Raviv | 14 | G | 5'9" | Sophomore | Netanya, Israel | Quinnipiac |
| Vittoria Blasigh | 15 | G | 5'9" | Junior | Udine, Italy | South Florida |
| Amarachi Kimpson | 33 | G | 5'8" | Junior | Little Elm, Texas | UNLV |
| Jessica Peterson | 35 | C | 6'2" | Graduate Student | Rancho Cucamonga, California | SMU |

=== Recruiting class ===
College recruiting
| Name | Hometown | School | Height | Weight | Commit date |
|---|---|---|---|---|---|
| Soma Okolo; F | Leander, Texas | Glenn High School | 6 ft 1 in (1.85 m) | N/A | Aug 3, 2024 |
| Soma Okolo; F | Recruit ratings: ESPN: (NR) | | | | |
| Danielle Osho; F | Dacula, Georgia | Hebron Christian Academy | 6 ft 1 in (1.85 m) | N/A | Oct 20, 2024 |
| Danielle Osho; F | Recruit ratings: ESPN: (94) | | | | |
| Meredith Tippner; G | Noblesville, Indiana | Noblesville High School | 5 ft 9 in (1.75 m) | N/A | Aug 2, 2024 |
| Meredith Tippner; G | Recruit ratings: ESPN: (91) | | | | |
| Natalie Wetzel; F | McMurray, Pennsylvania | Peters Township High School | 6 ft 3 in (1.91 m) | N/A | Jul 15, 2024 |
| Natalie Wetzel; F | Recruit ratings: ESPN: (92) | | | | |
| Camille Williams; G | Fort Worth, Texas | Boswell High School | 5 ft 11 in (1.80 m) | N/A | Aug 11, 2024 |
| Camille Williams; G | Recruit ratings: ESPN: (95) | | | | |
Overall recruit ranking:
Note: In many cases, Scout, Rivals, 247Sports, On3, and ESPN may conflict in their listings of height and weight.; In these cases, the average was taken. ESPN grades are on a 100-point scale.; Sources:

== Roster ==
2025–26 Miami Hurricanes women's basketball team
Players
Coaches

| Pos. | # | Name | Height | Year | Previous school | Hometown |
|---|---|---|---|---|---|---|
| C | 0 | Ra Shaya Kyle | 6 ft 6 in (1.98 m) | GS | Marion; Florida | Marion, IN |
| G | 1 | Camille Williams | 5 ft 11 in (1.8 m) | Fr | Boswell | Fort Worth, TX |
| F | 2 | Soma Okolo | 6 ft 1 in (1.85 m) | Fr | Glenn | Leander, TX |
| C | 4 | Candace Kpetikou | 6 ft 3 in (1.91 m) | RS So | Saint Joseph; Washington State | Niamey, Niger |
| G | 5 | Ahnay Adams | 5 ft 6 in (1.68 m) | So | Tilton School | New Bedford, MA |
| F | 7 | Danielle Osho | 6 ft 1 in (1.85 m) | Fr | Hebron Christian | Dacula, GA |
| F | 8 | Mya Kone | 6 ft 2 in (1.88 m) | Jr | Blanche Ely; FIU | Pompano Beach, FL |
| F | 12 | Natalie Wetzel | 6 ft 3 in (1.91 m) | Fr | Peters Township | McMurray, PA |
| G | 14 | Gal Raviv | 5 ft 9 in (1.75 m) | So | Bella Vista Prep; Quinnipiac | Netanya, Israel |
| G | 15 | Vittoria Blasigh | 5 ft 9 in (1.75 m) | Jr | SPAR Gran Canaria; South Florida | Udine, Italy |
| G | 22 | Simone Pelish | 6 ft 0 in (1.83 m) | RS Fr | Our Lady of Lourdes | Poughkeepsie, NY |
| G | 23 | Meredith Tippner | 5 ft 10 in (1.78 m) | Fr | Noblesville | Noblesville, IN |
| G | 33 | Amarachi Kimpson | 5 ft 8 in (1.73 m) | Jr | Little Elm; UNLV | Little Elm, TX |
| C | 35 | Jessica Peterson | 6 ft 2 in (1.88 m) | GS | Etiwanda; SMU | Rancho Cucamonga, CA |

Head coach

- Tricia Cullop (Purdue)

Assistant coach(es)

- Fitzroy Anthony (Palm Beach Atlantic)
- Jessie Ivey (West Florida)
- Danielle Page (Nebraska)
- Murriel Page (Florida)

Legend

- (C) Team captain
- (S) Suspended
- (I) Ineligible
- (W) Walk-on
- Injured
- Current redshirt

Roster
Last update: September 28, 2025

== Schedule ==
| Date time, TV | Rank^{#} | Opponent^{#} | Result | Record | High points | High rebounds | High assists | Site (attendance) city, state |
Exhibition
| October 18, 2025*; 12:00 p.m. | | Lynn | W 112–62 | — | 26 – Kyle | 7 – Tippner | – | Watsco Center; Coral Gables, FL |
Regular season
| November 3, 2025*; 5:00 p.m., ACCNX | | Hofstra | W 83–48 | 1–0 | 13 – Kyle | 8 – Peterson | 4 – Raviv | Watsco Center (803); Coral Gables, FL |
| November 6, 2025*; 11:00 a.m., ACCNX | | Bethune–Cookman | W 74–41 | 2–0 | 19 – Kyle | 11 – Kyle | 7 – Raviv | Watsco Center (2,956); Coral Gables, FL |
| November 13, 2025*; 7:00 p.m., ACCNX | | Florida Atlantic | W 79–47 | 3–0 | 14 – Kimpson | 9 – Peterson | 5 – Adams | Watsco Center (791); Coral Gables, FL |
| November 20, 2025*; 6:00 p.m., ESPNU | | vs. Davidson; WBCA Showcase | W 66–58 | 4–0 | 22 – Raviv | 11 – Kyle | 4 – Adams | ESPN Wide World of Sports Complex; Orlando, FL |
| November 22, 2025*; 8:00 p.m., ESPN+ | | vs. No. 19 Iowa; WBCA Showcase | L 61–64 | 4–1 | 19 – Kimpson | 8 – Kyle | 5 – Raviv | ESPN Wide World of Sports Complex (2,774); Orlando, FL |
| November 28, 2025*; 1:30 p.m., FloHoops | | vs. George Washington; Cayman Islands Classic | W 83–77 | 5–1 | 29 – Raviv | 14 – Kyle | 2 – Tied | John Gray Gymnasium; George Town, CI |
| November 29, 2025*; 11:00 a.m., FloHoops | | vs. No. 24 Oklahoma State; Cayman Islands Classic | L 84–87 | 5–2 | 21 – Raviv | 13 – Kyle | 4 – Adams | John Gray Gymnasium (475); George Town, CI |
| December 3, 2025*; 5:00 p.m., ESPN2 | | No. 17 Kentucky; ACC–SEC Challenge | L 48–64 | 5–3 | 12 – Raviv | 10 – Kyle | 1 – Tied | Watsco Center (859); Coral Gables, FL |
| December 7, 2025*; 2:00 p.m., ACCNX | | Georgia State | W 99–46 | 6–3 | 16 – Kyle | 17 – Kyle | 9 – Raviv | Watsco Center (1,021); Coral Gables, FL |
| December 14, 2025; 2:00 p.m., ACCNX | | NC State | L 61–87 | 6–4 (0–1) | 22 – Blasigh | 10 – Kyle | 3 – Tied | Watsco Center (744); Coral Gables, FL |
| December 18, 2025; 6:00 p.m., ACCNX | | at Wake Forest | W 64–61 | 7–4 (1–1) | 19 – Tippner | 7 – Osho | 3 – Tied | LJVM Coliseum (977); Winston-Salem, NC |
| December 21, 2025*; 12:00 p.m., ACCNX | | Kennesaw State | W 85–55 | 8–4 | 28 – Kyle | 10 – Kyle | 5 – Kimpson | Watsco Center (609); Coral Gables, FL |
| December 28, 2025*; 2:00 p.m., ACCNX | | Stetson | W 77–45 | 9–4 | 14 – Tied | 12 – Kyle | 4 – Tied | Watsco Center (847); Coral Gables, FL |
| January 1, 2026; 6:00 p.m., ACCNX | | at Virginia Tech | W 75–67 | 10–4 (2–1) | 23 – Kyle | 13 – Kyle | 3 – Raviv | Cassell Coliseum (4,617); Blacksburg, VA |
| January 4, 2026; 2:00 p.m., ACCNX | | Clemson | L 55–70 | 10–5 (2–2) | 12 – Tied | 9 – Kyle | 7 – Kyle | Watsco Center (914); Coral Gables, FL |
| January 8, 2026; 7:00 p.m., ACCNX | | No. 10 Louisville | L 68–77 | 10–6 (2–3) | 18 – Kimpson | 11 – Kyle | 5 – Kimpson | Watsco Center (606); Coral Gables, FL |
| January 11, 2026; 2:00 p.m., ACCNX | | Florida State | W 89–73 | 11–6 (3–3) | 30 – Kyle | 10 – Kyle | 9 – Raviv | Watsco Center (1,137); Coral Gables, FL |
| January 15, 2026; 7:00 p.m., ACCNX | | at North Carolina | L 62–73 | 11–7 (3–4) | 16 – Tied | 10 – Osho | 1 – tied | Carmichael Arena (3,320); Chapel Hill, NC |
| January 22, 2026; 6:00 p.m., ACCNX | | at Notre Dame | L 66–74 | 11–8 (3–5) | 21 – Kimpson | 10 – Kyle | 3 – Adams | Purcell Pavilion (6,669); Notre Dame, IN |
| January 25, 2026; 5:00 p.m., ACCNX | | at SMU | W 75–66 | 12–8 (4–5) | 23 – Kimpson | 10 – Okolo | 3 – Tied | Moody Coliseum (1,244); University Park, TX |
| January 29, 2026; 8:00 p.m., ACCN | | No. 20 Duke | L 58–74 | 12–9 (4–6) | 21 – Kyle | 9 – Kyle | 3 – Tied | Watsco Center (897); Coral Gables, FL |
| February 1, 2026; 2:00 p.m., ACCNX | | Syracuse | L 60–65 | 12–10 (4–7) | 13 – Tied | 8 – Kyle | 7 – Raviv | Watsco Center (1,505); Coral Gables, FL |
| February 5, 2026; 7:00 p.m., ACCNX | | at Virginia | L 56–67 | 12–11 (4–8) | 13 – Tied | 10 – Kyle | 6 – Raviv | John Paul Jones Arena (3,709); Charlottesville, VA |
| February 8, 2026; 2:00 p.m., ACCNX | | at Florida State | L 70–87 | 12–12 (4–9) | 23 – Kyle | 13 – Kyle | 5 – Tied | Donald L. Tucker Center (1,312); Tallahassee, FL |
| February 15, 2026; 12:00 p.m., ACCNX | | at Boston College | W 82–70 | 13–12 (5–9) | 24 – Kyle | 10 – Kyle | 9 – Raviv | Conte Forum (1,527); Chestnut Hill, MA |
| February 19, 2026; 8:00 p.m., ACCN | | Stanford | W 66–51 | 14–12 (6–9) | 19 – Raviv | 14 – Kyle | 5 – Kyle | Watsco Center (833); Coral Gables, FL |
| February 22, 2026; 2:00 p.m., ACCNX | | California | W 69–60 | 15–12 (7–9) | 16 – Kyle | 14 – Kyle | 6 – Adams | Watsco Center (832); Coral Gables, FL |
| February 26, 2026; 7:00 p.m., ACCNX | | Pittsburgh | W 79–58 | 16–12 (8–9) | 36 – Kyle | 13 – Kyle | 4 – Raviv | Watsco Center (839); Coral Gables, FL |
| March 1, 2026; 2:00 p.m., ACCNX | | at Georgia Tech | L 49–79 | 16–13 (8–10) | 11 – Raviv | 7 – Kyle | 4 – Adams | McCamish Pavilion (3,480); Atlanta, GA |
ACC Women's Tournament
| March 4, 2026*; 11:00 a.m., ACCN | (12) | vs. (13) Stanford; First Round | W 83–76 ^{OT} | 17–13 | 25 – Kyle | 11 – Kyle | 6 – Raviv | Gas South Arena (5,192); Duluth, GA |
| March 5, 2026*; 1:30 p.m., ACCN | (12) | vs. (5) Notre Dame; Second Round | L 54–69 | 17–14 | 15 – Raviv | 15 – Kyle | 4 – Adams | Gas South Arena (6,203); Duluth, GA |
WBIT
| March 19, 2026*; 7:00 p.m., ESPN+ | (2) | Georgia Southern; First Round | W 82–56 | 18–14 | 19 – Kimpson | 10 – Kyle | 7 – Adams | Watsco Center (601); Coral Gables, FL |
| March 22, 2026*; 12:00 p.m., ESPN+ | (2) | (3) Wisconsin; Second Round | L 65–72 | 18–15 | 20 – Raviv | 12 – Kyle | 8 – Raviv | Watsco Center (486); Coral Gables, FL |
*Non-conference game. ^{#}Rankings from AP poll. (#) Tournament seedings in parentheses. All times are in Eastern.
