= 2025–26 NC State Wolfpack women's basketball team =

Intercollegiate basketball season

2025–26 NC State Wolfpack women's basketball

NCAA tournament, Second Round
- Conference: Atlantic Coast Conference
- Record: 21–11 (13–5 ACC)
- Head coach: Wes Moore (13th season)
- Associate head coach: Nikki West (6th season)
- Assistant coaches: Ashley Williams (4th season); Simon Harris (1st season); Kevin Leatherwood (3rd season); Kayla Jones (1st season); Houston Fancher (8th season)
- Home arena: Reynolds Coliseum

2025–26 ACC women's basketball standings
	Conf.				Overall
Team	W		L	PCT	W		L	PCT
No. 5 Duke †	16	–	2	.889	27	–	9	.750
No. 11 Louisville	15	–	3	.833	29	–	8	.784
No. 13 North Carolina	14	–	4	.778	28	–	8	.778
NC State	13	–	5	.722	21	–	11	.656
No. 9 Notre Dame	12	–	6	.667	25	–	10	.714
Virginia Tech	12	–	6	.667	23	–	10	.697
Syracuse	12	–	6	.667	24	–	9	.727
No. 19 Virginia	11	–	7	.611	22	–	12	.647
Clemson	11	–	7	.611	21	–	12	.636
California	9	–	9	.500	21	–	15	.583
Georgia Tech	8	–	10	.444	14	–	19	.424
Miami (FL)	8	–	10	.444	18	–	15	.545
Stanford	8	–	10	.444	21	–	14	.600
Florida State	5	–	13	.278	10	–	21	.323
Wake Forest	4	–	14	.222	14	–	18	.438
SMU	2	–	16	.111	9	–	21	.300
Pittsburgh	1	–	17	.056	8	–	23	.258
Boston College	1	–	17	.056	5	–	26	.161
† 2026 ACC tournament winner Rankings from AP Poll

The 2025–26 NC State Wolfpack women's basketball team represented North Carolina State University during the 2025–26 NCAA Division I women's basketball season. The Wolfpack were led by thirteenth-year head coach Wes Moore and played their home games at Reynolds Coliseum as members of the Atlantic Coast Conference.

The Wolfpack began the season ranked ninth in the AP poll and faced off against two ranked teams: eighth-ranked Tennessee and eighteenth-ranked USC. They defeated Tennessee 80–77 but lost to USC 68–69. The results saw them fall slightly to tenth in the poll. Another 1–1 week, where they lost by ten points to seventeenth-ranked TCU, saw them fall to sixteenth. A loss to Rhode Island saw them fall to twenty-fifth before they traveled to Cancún, Mexico to participate in the Cancún Challenge. Despite winning both their games and finishing as Cancún Challenge champions, the Wolfpack fell out of the rankings. The team traveled from Mexico to Oklahoma, where they lost to the Oklahoma Sooners in the ACC–SEC Challenge in overtime. The Wolfpack then went on a six-game-winning streak which included four ACC wins. They began the season with victories over Miami, Georgia Tech, Stanford, and California. The streak was broken by a road loss to Clemson. The Wolfpack went 4–1 in their next five games, with the only loss coming to ninth-ranked Louisville in overtime. They also recorded an overtime win over Virginia. The Wolfpack experienced a tougher stretch over the next five games, going 2–3. They lost their rivalry game against twenty-fifth-ranked North Carolina by two points, and also lost at Notre Dame, and at ninth-ranked Duke. They finished the regular season with three straight wins.

The Wolfpack finished the regular season 20–9 overall and 13–5 in ACC play to finish in fourth place. As the fourth seed in the ACC tournament, they earned a bye into the quarterfinals, where they lost to Notre Dame for a second time this season. They received an at-large bid to the NCAA tournament, and were the seventh seed in the Fort Worth 3 regional. They defeated ten-seed Tennessee for the second time this year in the first round game. The team lost to second-seed and ninth-ranked Michigan in the second round by twenty-nine points to end their season. The Wolfpack finished the season with a 21–11 record, and were unranked in both the AP poll and oaches polls.

== Previous season ==
The Wolfpack finished the regular season 24–5 overall and 16–2 in ACC play to finish in a tie for first place. As the first seed in the ACC tournament, they earned a bye into the quarterfinals, where they defeated ninth-seed Georgia Tech, 73–72. They matched up with fifth-seed and fourteenth-ranked North Carolina in the Semifinals. They avenged their regular season loss by winning 66–55. The Wolfpack were defeated by third-seed and eleventh-ranked Duke in the final, 76–62. They received an at-large bid to the NCAA tournament, and were the two-seed in the Spokane 1 region. They defeated fifteen-seed Vermont and seven-seed Michigan State at home to advance to the Sweet Sixteen. There, they faced three seed and tenth ranked LSU in a rematch of their Pink Flamingo Championship game. They lost again to LSU, this time 80–73, to end their season. The Wolfpack finished the season with a 28–7 record, and ranked ninth in the AP poll and tenth in the coaches polls.

== Off-season ==
=== Departures ===
Departures
Name	Number	Pos.	Height	Year	Hometown	Reason for departure
Aziaha James	10	G	5'10"	Senior	Virginia Beach, Virginia	Graduated; drafted 12th overall in the 2025 WNBA draft
Caitlin Weimar	12	G	6'4"	Graduate student	Cortlandt Manor, New York	Graduated; transferred to Virginia
Lizzy Williamson	15	C	6'5"	Graduate student	Adelaide, Australia	Graduated; transferred to Oregon State
Madison Hayes	21	G	6'0"	Graduate student	Chattanooga, Tennessee	Graduated
Saniya Rivers	22	G	6'1"	Senior	Wilmington, North Carolina	Graduated; drafted 8th overall in the 2025 WNBA draft
Laci Steele	24	G	5'11"	Sophomore	Edmond, Oklahoma	Transferred to Wisconsin

=== Incoming transfers ===
Incoming transfers
Name	Number	Pos.	Height	Year	Hometown	Previous school
Qadence Samuels	2	G	6'0"	Junior	Forestville, Maryland	Connecticut
Khamil Pierre	12	G	6'2"	Junior	Phoenix, Arizona	Vanderbilt

=== Recruiting class ===
College recruiting
Name	Hometown	School	Height	Weight	Commit date
Adelaide Jernigan; G	Winston-Salem, North Carolina	Bishop McGuinness	5 ft 11 in (1.80 m)	N/A	Oct 6, 2024
Adelaide Jernigan; G	Recruit ratings: ESPN: (92)				
Destiny Lunan; F	Goodyear, Arizona	Millennium	5 ft 10 in (1.78 m)	N/A	Nov 15, 2024
Destiny Lunan; F	Recruit ratings: ESPN: (93)				
Overall recruit ranking:
Note: In many cases, Scout, Rivals, 247Sports, On3, and ESPN may conflict in their listings of height and weight.; In these cases, the average was taken. ESPN grades are on a 100-point scale.; Sources:

== Roster ==
2025–26 NC State Wolfpack women's basketball team
Players
Coaches

Pos.	#	Name	Height	Year	Previous school	Hometown
G	0	Devyn Quigley	5 ft 11 in (1.8 m)	So	Manchester Township	Manchester, NJ
C	1	Lorena Awou	6 ft 5 in (1.96 m)	So	United Township	East Moline, IL
G	2	Qadence Samuels	6 ft 0 in (1.83 m)	Jr	Bishop McNamara; Connecticut	Forestville, MD
G	3	Zamareya Jones	5 ft 7 in (1.7 m)	So	North Pitt	Bethel, NC
G	7	Destiny Lunan	5 ft 10 in (1.78 m)	Fr	Millennium	Goodyear, AZ
G	10	Adelaide Jernigan	5 ft 7 in (1.7 m)	Fr	Bishop McGuinness	Winston-Salem, NC
F	11	Maddie Cox	6 ft 2 in (1.88 m)	Jr	Flower Mound	Flower Mound, TX
F	12	Khamil Pierre	6 ft 2 in (1.88 m)	Jr	Perry; Vanderbilt	Phoenix, AZ
F	18	Tilda Trygger	6 ft 6 in (1.98 m)	So	NB Paterna	Stockholm, Sweden
G	35	Zoe Brooks	5 ft 10 in (1.78 m)	Jr	St. John Vianney	Plainfield, NJ
C	42	Mallory Collier	6 ft 3 in (1.91 m)	Jr	Bartlett	Millington, TN

Head coach

- Wes Moore (Johnson)

Assistant coach(es)

- Kikki West (Clemson)
- Ashley Williams (NC State)
- Simon Harris (NC State)
- Kevin Leatherwood (Carson–Newman)
- Kayla Jones (NC State)
- Houston Fancher (Middle Tennessee)

Legend

- (C) Team captain
- (S) Suspended
- (I) Ineligible
- (W) Walk-on
- Injured
- Current redshirt

Roster

== Schedule and results ==
Date time, TV	Rank^{#}	Opponent^{#}	Result	Record	High points	High rebounds	High assists	Site (attendance) city, state
Exhibition
October 18, 2025*; 7:00 p.m.	No. 9	High Point	W 77–69	–	15 – Trygger	12 – Trygger	5 – Jones	Reynolds Coliseum; Raleigh, NC
October 26, 2025*; 2:00 p.m.	No. 9	vs. No. 10 Maryland; The Bad Boy Mowers Series Exhibition	W 83–75	–	20 – Brooks	11 – Samuels	4 – Jones	First Horizon Coliseum (8,000); Greensboro, NC
Regular season
November 4, 2025*; 4:00 p.m., ESPN2	No. 9	vs. No. 8 Tennessee; Ro Greensboro Invitational	W 80–77	1–0	21 – Pierre	14 – Pierre	5 – Tied	First Horizon Coliseum (4,731); Greensboro, NC
November 9, 2025*; 3:00 p.m., ESPN	No. 9	vs. No. 18 USC; Ally Tipoff	L 68–69	1–1	24 – Brooks	18 – Pierre	6 – Brooks	Spectrum Center (5,208); Charlotte, NC
November 11, 2025*; 7:00 p.m., ACCNX	No. 10	Maine	W 66–47	2–1	18 – Pierre	10 – Pierre	5 – Jones	Reynolds Coliseum (4,575); Raleigh, NC
November 16, 2025*; 1:00 p.m., ESPN	No. 10	No. 17 TCU	L 59–69	2–2	15 – Trygger	10 – Brooks	6 – Brooks	Reynolds Coliseum (5,500); Raleigh, NC
November 19, 2025*; 6:00 p.m., ACCN	No. 16	Coastal Carolina	W 71–58	3–2	13 – Tied	10 – Pierre	8 – Tied	Reynolds Coliseum (4,513); Raleigh, NC
November 23, 2025*; 2:00 p.m., ACCNX	No. 16	Rhode Island	L 63–68	3–3	17 – Jones	8 – Tied	4 – Tied	Reynolds Coliseum (4,705); Raleigh, NC
November 27, 2025*; 4:00 p.m., FloCollege	No. 25	vs. Green Bay; Cancún Challenge Yucatan Tournament	W 79–67	4–3	21 – Brooks	21 – Pierre	7 – Brooks	Hard Rock Hotel Riviera Maya (200); Riviera Maya, MX
November 28, 2025*; 4:00 p.m., FloCollege	No. 25	vs. Southern Miss; Cancún Challenge Yucatan Tournament	W 110–56	5–3	18 – Pierre	16 – Pierre	8 – Jones	Hard Rock Hotel Riviera Maya; Riviera Maya, MX
December 3, 2025*; 7:15 p.m., ESPN2		at No. 9 Oklahoma; ACC–SEC Challenge	L 98–103 ^{OT}	5–4	26 – Jones	20 – Pierre	3 – Jones	Lloyd Noble Center (4,614); Norman, OK
December 7, 2025*; 2:00 p.m., ACCNX		Seton Hall	W 61–53	6–4	12 – Jones	12 – Cox	5 – Tied	Reynolds Coliseum (4,789); Raleigh, NC
December 14, 2025; 2:00 p.m., ACCNX		at Miami (FL)	W 87–61	7–4 (1–0)	21 – Pierre	13 – Pierre	4 – Jones	Watsco Center (744); Coral Gables, FL
December 18, 2025; 7:00 p.m., ACCNX		Georgia Tech	W 87–58	8–4 (2–0)	17 – Jones	9 – Pierre	7 – Jones	Reynolds Coliseum (4,432); Raleigh, NC
December 21, 2025*; 1:00 p.m., ESPN+		at Davidson	W 68–59	9–4	23 – Pierre	13 – Pierre	4 – Samuels	John M. Belk Arena (1,521); Davidson, NC
January 1, 2026; 2:00 p.m., ACCN		Stanford	W 74–46	10–4 (3–0)	18 – Brooks	8 – Trygger	6 – Brooks	Reynolds Coliseum (5,500); Raleigh, NC
January 4, 2026; 2:00 p.m., The CW		California	W 71–60	11–4 (4–0)	21 – Pierre	7 – Pierre	7 – Jones	Reynolds Coliseum (5,113); Raleigh, NC
January 8, 2026; 8:00 p.m., ACCN		at Clemson	L 65–75	11–5 (4–1)	19 – Trygger	11 – Tied	6 – Brooks	Littlejohn Coliseum (861); Clemson, SC
January 11, 2026; 6:00 p.m., ACCN		SMU	W 91–54	12–5 (5–1)	16 – Samuels	12 – Pierre	3 – Tied	Reynolds Coliseum (5,500); Raleigh, NC
January 15, 2026; 6:00 p.m., ACCNX		at Wake Forest	W 95–77	13–5 (6–1)	26 – Pierre	14 – Pierre	9 – Brooks	LJVM Coliseum (1,858); Winston-Salem, NC
January 18, 2026; 1:00 p.m., ESPN2		No. 9 Louisville	L 80–88 ^{OT}	13–6 (6–2)	26 – Pierre	8 – Samuels	6 – Jones	Reynolds Coliseum (5,500); Raleigh, NC
January 24, 2026; 2:00 p.m., ACCNX		at Virginia	W 78–76 ^{OT}	14–6 (7–2)	37 – Brooks	12 – Pierre	5 – Brooks	John Paul Jones Arena (4,291); Charlottesville, VA
January 29, 2026; 6:00 p.m., ACCN		at Boston College	W 106–84	15–6 (8–2)	27 – Brooks	12 – Pierre	7 – Brooks	Conte Forum (623); Chestnut Hill, MA
February 2, 2026; 6:00 p.m., ESPN2		No. 25 North Carolina; Rivalry	L 59–61	15–7 (8–3)	14 – Pierre	15 – Pierre	4 – Brooks	Reynolds Coliseum (5,500); Raleigh, NC
February 5, 2026; 8:00 p.m., ACCN		Florida State	W 83–55	16–7 (9–3)	25 – Jones	18 – Pierre	3 – Tied	Reynolds Coliseum (4,973); Raleigh, NC
February 8, 2026; 12:00 p.m., ACCN		at Virginia Tech	W 82–62	17–7 (10–3)	25 – Tied	12 – Pierre	5 – Brooks	Cassell Coliseum (4,454); Blacksburg, VA
February 15, 2026; 4:00 p.m., ESPN		at Notre Dame	L 67–79	17–8 (10–4)	21 – Jones	11 – Pierre	4 – Brooks	Purcell Pavilion (8,367); Notre Dame, IN
February 19, 2026; 7:00 p.m., ESPN		at No. 9 Duke	L 65–83	17–9 (10–5)	24 – Pierre	5 – Pierre	4 – Jones	Cameron Indoor Stadium (4,951); Durham, NC
February 22, 2026; 2:00 p.m., The CW		Syracuse	W 82–69	18–9 (11–5)	25 – Pierre	15 – Pierre	8 – Jones	Reynolds Coliseum (5,500); Raleigh, NC
February 26, 2026; 7:00 p.m., ACCNX		Wake Forest	W 65–56	19–9 (12–5)	17 – Brooks	12 – Pierre	5 – Jones	Reynolds Coliseum (5,500); Raleigh, NC
March 1, 2026; 2:00 p.m., ACCN		at Pittsburgh	W 93–43	20–9 (13–5)	20 – Brooks	12 – Pierre	5 – Brooks	Petersen Events Center (1,369); Pittsburgh, PA
ACC tournament
March 6, 2025*; 11:00 a.m., ESPN2	(4)	vs. (5) Notre Dame; Quarterfinals	L 63–81	20–10	17 – Pierre	14 – Pierre	5 – Brooks	Gas South Arena (8,233); Duluth, GA
NCAA tournament
March 20, 2025*; 8:00 p.m., ESPN	(7 FW3)	vs. (10 FW3) Tennessee; Round of 64	W 76–61	21–10	30 – Jones	12 – Pierre	4 – Trygger	Crisler Center (8,491); Ann Arbor, MI
March 22, 2025*; 1:00 p.m., ABC	(7 FW3)	vs. (2 FW3) Michigan; Round of 32	L 63–92	21–11	16 – Jones	9 – Pierre	9 – Jones	Crisler Center (7,003); Ann Arbor, MI
*Non-conference game. ^{#}Rankings from AP Poll. (#) Tournament seedings in parentheses. FW3=Fort Worth 3. All times are in Eastern.

== Rankings ==
Ranking movements Legend: ██ Increase in ranking ██ Decrease in ranking — = Not ranked RV = Received votes
	Week																				
Poll	Pre	1	2	3	4	5	6	7	8	9	10	11	12	13	14	15	16	17	18	19	Final
AP	9	10	16	25	RV	RV	RV	RV	RV*	RV	RV	RV	RV	RV	RV	—	RV	RV	—	—	RV
Coaches	8	9	16	24	25	RV	—	—	—	RV	—	—	—	RV	RV	—	—	RV	—	—	RV

*AP did not release a week 8 poll.
