= 2025–26 Virginia Cavaliers women's basketball team =

Intercollegiate basketball season

2025–26 Virginia Cavaliers women's basketball

NCAA tournament, Sweet Sixteen
- Conference: Atlantic Coast Conference

Ranking
- Coaches: No. 24
- AP: No. 19
- Record: 22–12 (11–7 ACC)
- Head coach: Amaka Agugua-Hamilton (4th season)
- Associate head coach: CJ Jones (4th season)
- Assistant coaches: Tori Jankoska (4th season); Alysiah Bond (4th season); Ronald Hughey (1st season); Janko Popovic (3rd season)
- Home arena: John Paul Jones Arena

2025–26 ACC women's basketball standings
	Conf.				Overall
Team	W		L	PCT	W		L	PCT
No. 5 Duke †	16	–	2	.889	27	–	9	.750
No. 11 Louisville	15	–	3	.833	29	–	8	.784
No. 13 North Carolina	14	–	4	.778	28	–	8	.778
NC State	13	–	5	.722	21	–	11	.656
No. 9 Notre Dame	12	–	6	.667	25	–	10	.714
Virginia Tech	12	–	6	.667	23	–	10	.697
Syracuse	12	–	6	.667	24	–	9	.727
No. 19 Virginia	11	–	7	.611	22	–	12	.647
Clemson	11	–	7	.611	21	–	12	.636
California	9	–	9	.500	21	–	15	.583
Georgia Tech	8	–	10	.444	14	–	19	.424
Miami (FL)	8	–	10	.444	18	–	15	.545
Stanford	8	–	10	.444	21	–	14	.600
Florida State	5	–	13	.278	10	–	21	.323
Wake Forest	4	–	14	.222	14	–	18	.438
SMU	2	–	16	.111	9	–	21	.300
Pittsburgh	1	–	17	.056	8	–	23	.258
Boston College	1	–	17	.056	5	–	26	.161
† 2026 ACC tournament winner Rankings from AP Poll

The 2025–26 Virginia Cavaliers women's basketball team represented the University of Virginia during the 2025–26 NCAA Division I women's basketball season. The Cavaliers were led by fourth-year head coach Amaka Agugua-Hamilton, and played their home games at John Paul Jones Arena in Charlottesville, Virginia as members of the Atlantic Coast Conference.

The Cavaliers began the season by winning four of their first five games, with the only loss coming against UMBC. They then travelled to Niceville, Florida to participate in the Emerald Coast Classic. There the team went 1–1, defeating Northwestern State and losing to Nebraska. They returned to Virginia to defeat Maryland Eastern Shore before losing to fifteenth-ranked Vanderbilt in the ACC–SEC Challenge. After that loss, the Cavaliers won seven straight games, including their final two non-conference games of the season. They did not face a ranked team over this stretch, but did defeat Florida State in double overtime. Their winning streak was broken by Syracuse in a nineteen-point home loss. They followed that with a loss at Duke. The Cavaliers went 3–2 over their next five games, losing to NC State in overtime and their rivalry game against Virginia Tech. The closest win was at Wake Forest in triple overtime. The team finished 3–3 over their final six games defeating Notre Dame, Stanford, and eighth-ranked Louisville. They lost to California, twenty-first ranked North Carolina, and they lost by one point in their rivalry rematch with Virginia Tech.

The Cavaliers finished the season 22–12 overall and 11–7 in ACC play to finish in a tie for eighth place. As the eighth seed in the ACC tournament, they earned a bye into the Second Round, where they faced ninth seed Clemson. The Cavaliers lost 50–63 despite having defeated Clemson during the regular season.They were received an at-large invitation to the NCAA tournament. Virginia was the tenth seed in the Sacramento 4 region. They defeated Arizona State by two points in the First Four, and moved on to upset seventh seed Georgia in the First Round. The Cavailers also upset second seed Iowa in the Second Round to advance to their first Sweet 16 since 2000. Their cinderella run ended there as they were defeated by third seed TCU. Head coach Amaka Agugua-Hamilton was fired after the season.

== Previous season ==
The Cavaliers finished the season 17–15 overall and 8–10 in ACC play to finish in a tie for tenth place. As the tenth seed in the ACC tournament, they faced fifteenth seed Pittsburgh in the First Round. The Cavaliers won 64–50 to advance to the second round, where they lost to California 75–58. They were not invited to the NCAA tournament or the WBIT.

== Offseason ==
=== Departures ===
Departures
Name	Number	Pos.	Height	Year	Hometown	Reason for departure
Rylee Grays	2	F	6'4"	Sophomore	Pearland, Texas	Transferred to Tulsa
Yonta Vaughn	5	G	5'8"	Junior	District Heights, Maryland	Entered transfer portal
Hawa Doumbouya	7	C	6'7"	Sophomore	Bronx, New York	Transferred to VCU
Edessa Noyan	8	F	6'3"	Sophomore	Södertälje, Sweden	Transferred to Indiana
Casey Valenti-Paea	10	G	5'9"	Graduate student	Melbourne, Australia	Graduated; transferred to Grand Canyon
Kamryn Kitchen	12	G	5'9"	Freshman	Charlotte, North Carolina	Transferred to Arizona
Payton Dunbar	23	G	5'11"	Freshman	Narrows, Virginia	Transferred to Providence
Latasha Lattimore	35	F	6'4"	Senior	Toronto, Canada	Graduated; transferred to Ole Miss
Taylor Lauterbach	41	C	6'7"	Graduate student	Appleton, Wisconsin	Graduated

=== Incoming transfers ===
Incoming transfers
Name	Number	Pos.	Height	Year	Hometown	Previous school
Raianne Dias Dos Santos	2	G	5'9"	(redshirt) Junior	São Paulo, Brazil	Florida State
Sa'Myah Smith	5	F	6'2"	(redshirt) Junior	Texarkana, Texas	LSU
Tabitha Amanze	7	F	6'4"	Senior	Ogun, Nigeria	Princeton
Adeang Ring	8	F	6'5"	Sophomore	Sydney, Australia	UCF
Caitlin Weimar	12	F	6'4"	Graduate student	Cortlandt Manor, New York	NC State
Romi Levy	23	G	6'3"	Graduate student	Herzliya, Israel	South Florida
Danelle Arigbabu	28	F	6'4"	Graduate student	Berlin, Germany	West Virginia

=== Recruiting class ===
College recruiting
Name	Hometown	School	Height	Weight	Commit date
Gabby White; G	Chapel Hill, North Carolina	Seaforth High School	5 ft 10 in (1.78 m)	N/A	Aug 6, 2024
Gabby White; G	Recruit ratings: 247Sports: ESPN: (91)				
Overall recruit ranking:
Note: In many cases, Scout, Rivals, 247Sports, On3, and ESPN may conflict in their listings of height and weight.; In these cases, the average was taken. ESPN grades are on a 100-point scale.; Sources:

== Roster ==
2025–26 Virginia Cavaliers women's basketball team
Players
Coaches

Pos.	#	Name	Height	Year	Previous school	Hometown
G	0	Olivia McGhee	6 ft 2 in (1.88 m)	Jr	IMG Academy	Louisa, VA
G	1	Paris Clark	5 ft 8 in (1.73 m)	Sr	Long Island Lutheran; Arizona	New York, NY
G	4	Raiane Dias Dos Santos	5 ft 9 in (1.75 m)	RS Fr	Gulf Coast State; Florida State	São Paulo, Brazil
G	3	Gabby White	5 ft 10 in (1.78 m)	Fr	Seaforth	Chapel Hill, NC
G	4	Jillian Brown	5 ft 11 in (1.8 m)	GS	East Grand Rapids; Northwestern	Grand Rapids, MI
F	5	Sa'Myah Smith	6 ft 2 in (1.88 m)	RS Jr	DeSoto; LSU	Texarkana, TX
F	7	Tabitha Amanze	6 ft 4 in (1.93 m)	Sr	Blair Academy; Princeton	Ogun, Nigeria
F	8	Adeang Ring	6 ft 5 in (1.96 m)	So	Bella Vista College Prep; UCF	Sydney, Australia
F	12	Caitlin Weimar	6 ft 4 in (1.93 m)	GS	Hendrick Hudson; NC State	Cortlandt Manor, NY
G	21	Kymora Johnson	5 ft 7 in (1.7 m)	Jr	St. Anne's-Belfield	Charlottesville, VA
G	23	Romi Levy	6 ft 3 in (1.91 m)	GS	Hof HaSharon; South Florida	Herzliya, Israel
F	28	Danelle Arigbabu	6 ft 4 in (1.93 m)	GS	Northeastern Oklahoma A&M College; West Virginia	Berlin, Germany
F	32	Breona Hurd	6 ft 2 in (1.88 m)	So	Waynesville	Waynesville, MO

Head coach

- Amaka Agugua-Hamilton (Hofstra)

Assistant coach(es)

- CJ Jones (Francis Marion)
- Tori Jankoska (Michigan State)
- Alysiah Bond (Ohio State)
- Ronald Hughey (Limestone)
- Janko Popovic (Winthrop)

Legend

- (C) Team captain
- (S) Suspended
- (I) Ineligible
- (W) Walk-on
- Injured
- Current redshirt

Roster

== Schedule ==
Date time, TV	Rank^{#}	Opponent^{#}	Result	Record	High points	High rebounds	High assists	Site (attendance) city, state
Exhibition
October 30, 2025*; 7:00 p.m.		Frostburg State	W 99–38	–	–	–	–	John Paul Jones Arena; Charlottesville, VA
Regular season
November 4, 2025*; 7:00 p.m., ACCNX		Morgan State	W 86–36	1–0	24 – Johnson	11 – Levy	5 – Johnson	John Paul Jones Arena (3,597); Charlottesville, VA
November 9, 2025*; 2:00 p.m., ACCNX		Bucknell	W 80–35	2–0	23 – Johnson	11 – Amanze	7 – Johnson	John Paul Jones Arena (3,874); Charlottesville, VA
November 13, 2025*; 7:00 p.m., ACCNX		UMBC	L 56–61	2–1	22 – Hurd	9 – Levy	5 – Johnson	John Paul Jones Arena (3,531); Charlottesville, VA
November 16, 2025*; 2:00 p.m., ACCNX		Radford	W 77–46	3–1	21 – Amanze	12 – Amanze	8 – Johnson	John Paul Jones Arena (3,754); Charlottesville, VA
November 20, 2025*; 6:00 p.m., ACCNX		Longwood	W 94–47	4–1	23 – Johnson	12 – Tied	10 – Levy	John Paul Jones Arena (3,569); Charlottesville, VA
November 24, 2025*; 8:30 p.m., FloSports		vs. Northwestern State; Emerald Coast Classic Bay Bracket Semifinal	W 69–48	5–1	13 – White	6 – Tied	4 – Ring	Raider Arena (700); Niceville, FL
November 25, 2025*; 8:30 p.m., FloSports		vs. Nebraska; Emerald Coast Classic Bay Bracket Championship	L 82–91	5–2	24 – Johnson	6 – Tied	6 – Johnson	Raider Arena (850); Niceville, FL
November 30, 2025*; 2:00 p.m., ACCNX		Maryland Eastern Shore	W 92–59	6–2	20 – Johnson	9 – Amanze	5 – Johnson	John Paul Jones Arena (3,742); Charlottesville, VA
December 3, 2025*; 5:00 p.m., SECN		at No. 15 Vanderbilt; ACC–SEC Challenge	L 68–81	6–3	22 – Johnson	6 – Amanze	7 – Johnson	Memorial Gymnasium (2,661); Nashville, TN
December 7, 2025; 12:00 p.m., ACCNX		at Boston College	W 81–55	7–3 (1–0)	13 – Tied	10 – Amanze	9 – Johnson	Conte Forum (836); Chestnut Hill, MA
December 10, 2025*; 7:00 p.m., ACCNX		Howard	W 76–50	8–3	18 – Smith	8 – Smith	7 – Tied	John Paul Jones Arena (3,611); Charlottesville, VA
December 20, 2025*; 12:00 p.m., ACCNX		Winthrop	W 88–53	9–3	41 – Johnson	9 – Clark	12 – Clark	John Paul Jones Arena (4,077); Charlottesville, VA
December 29, 2025; 7:00 p.m., ACCNX		SMU	W 76–52	10–3 (2–0)	17 – Johnson	15 – Smith	10 – Johnson	John Paul Jones Arena (4,222); Charlottesville, VA
January 1, 2026; 7:00 p.m., ACCNX		Clemson	W 73–63	11–3 (3–0)	18 – Amanze	11 – Amanze	8 – Johnson	John Paul Jones Arena (4,032); Charlottesville, VA
January 4, 2026; 2:00 p.m., ACCN		at Florida State	W 91–87 ^{2OT}	12–3 (4–0)	31 – Johnson	11 – Weimar	11 – Johnson	Donald L. Tucker Center (1,126); Tallahassee, FL
January 8, 2026; 7:00 p.m., ACCNX		at Georgia Tech	W 61–59	13–3 (5–0)	14 – Clark	12 – Amanze	6 – Johnson	McCamish Pavilion (1,526); Atlanta, GA
January 11, 2026; 2:00 p.m., ACCNX		Syracuse	L 60–79	13–4 (5–1)	19 – Johnson	8 – Weimar	5 – Tied	John Paul Jones Arena (5,797); Charlottesville, VA
January 15, 2026; 8:00 p.m., ACCN		at Duke	L 58–65	13–5 (5–2)	20 – Amanze	7 – Smith	4 – Clark	Cameron Indoor Stadium (2,533); Durham, NC
January 22, 2026; 7:00 p.m., ACCNX		Pittsburgh	W 84–46	14–5 (6–2)	20 – Weimar	9 – White	9 – Johnson	John Paul Jones Arena (3,755); Charlottesville, VA
January 24, 2026; 2:00 p.m., ACCNX		NC State	L 76–78 ^{OT}	14–6 (6–3)	26 – Johnson	10 – Weimar	9 – Johnson	John Paul Jones Arena (4,291); Charlottesville, VA
January 29, 2026; 6:00 p.m., ACCNX		at Wake Forest	W 109–103 ^{3OT}	15–6 (7–3)	26 – Johnson	12 – White	8 – Johnson	LJVM Coliseum (1,178); Winston-Salem, NC
February 1, 2026; 2:00 p.m., ACCNX		at Virginia Tech; Rivalry	L 64–76	15–7 (7–4)	19 – Johnson	11 – Smith	3 – Johnson	Cassell Coliseum (5,281); Blacksburg, VA
February 5, 2026; 7:00 p.m., ACCNX		Miami (FL)	W 67–56	16–7 (8–4)	18 – Johnson	7 – Tied	5 – Johnson	John Paul Jones Arena (3,709); Charlottesville, VA
February 8, 2026; 2:00 p.m., ACCNX		Notre Dame	W 81–70	17–7 (9–4)	29 – Johnson	9 – Smith	5 – Johnson	John Paul Jones Arena (5,223); Charlottesville, VA
February 12, 2026; 10:00 p.m., ACCNX		at California	L 58–64	17–8 (9–5)	14 – Amanze	8 – Levy	8 – Johnson	Haas Pavilion (1,310); Berkeley, CA
February 15, 2026; 2:00 p.m., The CW		at Stanford	W 75–69	18–8 (10–5)	25 – Johnson	9 – White	4 – Johnson	Maples Pavilion (3,358); Stanford, CA
February 22, 2026; 12:00 p.m., The CW		at No. 8 Louisville	W 74–72	19–8 (11–5)	16 – Johnson	11 – Amazne	8 – Clark	KFC Yum! Center (8,984); Louisville, KY
February 26, 2026; 7:00 p.m., ACCNX		No. 21 North Carolina	L 70–82	19–9 (11–6)	22 – Johnson	6 – Tied	5 – Clark	John Paul Jones Arena (4,669); Charlottesville, VA
March 1, 2026; 12:00 p.m., ACCN		Virginia Tech; Rivalry	L 82–83	19–10 (11–7)	26 – Johnson	7 – Tied	6 – Johnson	John Paul Jones Arena (5,125); Charlottesville, VA
ACC tournament
March 5, 2026*; 11:00 a.m., ACCN	(8)	vs. (9) Clemson; Second Round	L 50–63	19–11	15 – Clark	11 – Smith	3 – Tied	Gas South Arena (6,203); Duluth, GA
NCAA tournament
March 19, 2026*; 9:00 p.m., ESPN2	(10 S4)	vs. (10 S4) Arizona State; First Four	W 57–55	20–11	17 – Johnson	12 – Weimar	5 – Johnson	Carver–Hawkeye Arena (707); Iowa City, IA
March 21, 2026*; 1:30 p.m., ESPN2	(10 S4)	vs. (7 S4) Georgia; First Round	W 82–73 ^{OT}	21–11	28 – Johnson	11 – Smith	6 – Johnson	Carver–Hawkeye Arena (14,332); Iowa City, IA
March 23, 2026*; 2:00 p.m., ESPN	(10 S4)	at (2 S4) No. 7 Iowa; Second Round	W 83–75 ^{2OT}	22–11	28 – Johnson	10 – Smith	4 – Tied	Carver–Hawkeye Arena (14,332); Iowa City, IA
March 28, 2026*; 7:30 p.m., ESPN	(10 S4)	vs. (3 S4) No. 14 TCU; Sweet Sixteen	L 69–79	22–12	20 – Clark	6 – Johnson	8 – Johnson	Golden 1 Center (9,583); Sacramento, CA
*Non-conference game. ^{#}Rankings from AP Poll. (#) Tournament seedings in parentheses. S4=Sacramento 4. All times are in Eastern.

== Rankings ==
Ranking movements Legend: ██ Increase in ranking ██ Decrease in ranking — = Not ranked RV = Received votes
	Week																				
Poll	Pre	1	2	3	4	5	6	7	8	9	10	11	12	13	14	15	16	17	18	19	Final
AP	—	—	—	—	—	—	—	—	—	—	—	—	—	—	—	—	RV	—	—	—	19
Coaches	—	RV	—	—	—	—	—	—	—	—	—	RV	—	—	—	—	—	—	—	—	24
