= 2025–26 North Carolina Tar Heels women's basketball team =

Intercollegiate basketball season

2025–26 North Carolina Tar Heels women's basketball

NCAA tournament, Sweet Sixteen
- Conference: Atlantic Coast Conference

Ranking
- Coaches: No. 13
- AP: No. 13
- Record: 28–8 (14–4 ACC)
- Head coach: Courtney Banghart (7th season)
- Associate head coach: Joanne Aluka-White (7th season)
- Assistant coaches: Cory McNeill (2nd season); Katherine Bixby (1st season); Daniel Metzelfeld (3rd season); Lexi Weger (1st season)
- Home arena: Carmichael Arena

2025–26 ACC women's basketball standings
	Conf.				Overall
Team	W		L	PCT	W		L	PCT
No. 5 Duke †	16	–	2	.889	27	–	9	.750
No. 11 Louisville	15	–	3	.833	29	–	8	.784
No. 13 North Carolina	14	–	4	.778	28	–	8	.778
NC State	13	–	5	.722	21	–	11	.656
No. 9 Notre Dame	12	–	6	.667	25	–	10	.714
Virginia Tech	12	–	6	.667	23	–	10	.697
Syracuse	12	–	6	.667	24	–	9	.727
No. 19 Virginia	11	–	7	.611	22	–	12	.647
Clemson	11	–	7	.611	21	–	12	.636
California	9	–	9	.500	21	–	15	.583
Georgia Tech	8	–	10	.444	14	–	19	.424
Miami (FL)	8	–	10	.444	18	–	15	.545
Stanford	8	–	10	.444	21	–	14	.600
Florida State	5	–	13	.278	10	–	21	.323
Wake Forest	4	–	14	.222	14	–	18	.438
SMU	2	–	16	.111	9	–	21	.300
Pittsburgh	1	–	17	.056	8	–	23	.258
Boston College	1	–	17	.056	5	–	26	.161
† 2026 ACC tournament winner Rankings from AP Poll

The 2025–26 North Carolina Tar Heels women's basketball team represented the University of North Carolina at Chapel Hill during the 2025–26 NCAA Division I women's basketball season. The Tar Heels, led by seventh-year head coach Courtney Banghart, played their home games at Carmichael Arena in Chapel Hill, North Carolina as members of the Atlantic Coast Conference (ACC).

The Tar Heels began the season by winning two games while being the eleventh-ranked team in the nation before traveling to Paradise, Nevada to participate in the WBCA Challenge. They lost the opening game there by eighteen points to third-ranked, and eventual national champion UCLA. They won their consolation game against Fairfield to leave Nevada with a 1–1 record. The results saw them fall to fourteenth in the rankings. They won two further non-conference games and rebounded to twevlfth in the rankings before travelling to Cancún to participate in the Cancún Challenge. They won all three of their games in Mexico to finish as the Mayan Tournament champions; the wins saw them bounce back to eleventh in the polls. They then travelled to face second-ranked Texas, where they lost their ACC–SEC Challenge matchup. Combined with a forty-two point victory over Boston University, the Tar Heels only fell one spot to twelfth for their opening ACC game against twenty-second ranked Louisville. The Cardinals prevailed in overtime. They loss saw them fall back to eighteenth in the polls. Four straight wins, including ACC victories over Boston College and California saw the Tar Heels rise to sixteenth in the polls. However, an overtime loss to Stanford and a road loss by twenty-three points to Notre Dame saw the team fall out of the rankings. They went on a streak of eight straight wins. The stretch included an overtime win over Syracuse, a two-point rivalry win at NC State and a fifty-two point victory over SMU. Their winning streak was broken with a rivalry loss to eleventh-ranked Duke. The Tar Heels re-entered the rankings over this stretch, rising to twenty first at the time of their loss to Duke. An overtime victory over Virginia Tech and a win over Pittsburgh saw them climb back to twenty-first, where they defeated Virginia on the road and won their rematch with Duke to end the regular season.

The Tar Heels finished the regular season 25–6 overall and 14–4 in ACC play to finish in third place. As the third seed in the ACC tournament, earned a double-bye into the quarterfinals, where they defeated sixth seed Virginia Tech 85–68. They lost to second seed and twelfth-ranked Louisville 57–65 in the semifinals. They received an at-large invitation to the NCAA tournament and were the four-seed in the Forth Worth 1 region. They defeated thirteen-seed Western Illinois in the first round and five-seed and seventeenth-ranked Maryland in the second round. The Tar Heels hosted both games, before traveling to a neutral site to face first seed, top-ranked, UConn. The Tar Heels lost 42–63 to end their season. They finished with a 28–8 overall record.

== Previous season ==
The Tar Heels finished the regular season 25–6 overall and 13–5 in ACC play to finish in a three-way tie for fourth place. As the fifth seed in the ACC tournament, earned a bye into the second round, where they defeated Boston College 78–71. They avenged a regular season loss to Florida State, who was ranked twenty-second at the time of this meeting, in the quarterfinals 60–56. They lost in the semifinals to first seed and seventh-ranked rival NC State 66–55 to end their tournament run. They received an at-large invitation to the NCAA tournament and were the three-seed in the Birmingham 2 region. They defeated fourteen seed Oregon State in the first round and six-seed and sixteenth-ranked West Virginia in the second round. The Tar Heels hosted both games, before traveling to a neutral site to face second seed, seventh-ranked, rival Duke for a third time this season. After splitting the regular season series, Duke won the post-season matchup 47–38 to end the Tar Heels' season. They finished with an overall record of 29–8. Their 29 wins was the highest since the 2012–13 season.

== Offseason ==
=== Departures ===
Departures
Name	Number	Pos.	Height	Year	Hometown	Reason for departure
Alyssa Ustby	1	G/F	6'1"	Graduate student	Rochester, Minnesota	Graduated
Grace Townsend	2	G	5'5"	Graduate student	Midlothian, Virginia	Graduated
Maria Gakdeng	5	F/C	6'3"	Senior	Lanham, Maryland	Graduated
Kayla McPherson	11	G	5'8"	(redshirt) Junior	Hull, Georgia	Retired from basketball
Trayanna Crisp	14	G	5'8"	Junior	Goodyear, Arizona	Transferred to Mississippi State
Lexi Donarski	20	G	6'0"	Graduate student	La Crosse, Wisconsin	Graduated

=== Additions ===
==== Incoming transfers ====
Incoming transfers
Name	Number	Pos.	Height	Year	Hometown	Previous school
Nyla Harris	2	F	6'2"	Senior	Windermere, Florida	Louisville
Elina Aarnisalo	17	G	5'10"	Sophomore	Helsinki, Finland	UCLA

==== Recruiting class ====
College recruiting
Name	Hometown	School	Height	Weight	Commit date
Liza Astakhova; F	Moscow, Russia	Znaika School	6 ft 2 in (1.88 m)	N/A	Aug 20, 2025
Liza Astakhova; F	Recruit ratings: ESPN: (NR)				
Nyla Brooks; G	Waldorf, Maryland	Bishop Ireton	6 ft 1 in (1.85 m)	N/A	Aug 29, 2024
Nyla Brooks; G	Recruit ratings: ESPN: (97)				
Taliyah Henderson; G	Vail, Arizona	Salpointe Catholic	6 ft 1 in (1.85 m)	N/A	Aug 23, 2024
Taliyah Henderson; G	Recruit ratings: ESPN: (96)				
Taissa Queiroz; G	Belo Horizonte, Brazil	Cardinal Newman	6 ft 1 in (1.85 m)	N/A	Oct 13, 2024
Taissa Queiroz; G	Recruit ratings: ESPN: (92)				
Overall recruit ranking:
Note: In many cases, Scout, Rivals, 247Sports, On3, and ESPN may conflict in their listings of height and weight.; In these cases, the average was taken. ESPN grades are on a 100-point scale.; Sources:

== Roster ==
2025–26 North Carolina Tar Heels women's basketball team
Players
Coaches

Pos.	#	Name	Height	Year	Previous school	Hometown
G	0	Lanie Grant	5 ft 9 in (1.75 m)	So	James River	Midlothian, VA
G	1	Jordan Zubich	5 ft 11 in (1.8 m)	So	Mountain Iron-Buhl	Mountain Iron, MN
F	2	Nyla Harris	6 ft 2 in (1.88 m)	Sr	Lake Highland Prep; Louisville	Winermere, FL
G	3	Taliyah Henderson	6 ft 1 in (1.85 m)	Fr	Salpointe Catholic	Vail, AZ
F	4	Laila Hull	6 ft 1 in (1.85 m)	RS So	Zionsville Community	Zionsville, IN
F	5	Liza Astakhova	6 ft 2 in (1.88 m)	Fr	Znaika School	Moscow, Russia
G	7	Nyla Brooks	6 ft 1 in (1.85 m)	Fr	Bishop Ireton	Waldorf, MD
G	10	Reniya Kelly	5 ft 7 in (1.7 m)	Jr	Hoover	Hoover, AL
G	15	Sydney Barker	5 ft 7 in (1.7 m)	Jr	Jordan	Durham, NC
G	17	Elina Aarnisalo	5 ft 10 in (1.78 m)	So	Mäkelänrinne; UCLA	Helsinki, Finland
F	21	Ciera Toomey	6 ft 4 in (1.93 m)	RS So	Dunmore	Dunmore, PA
G	24	Indya Nivar	5 ft 10 in (1.78 m)	Sr	Apex Friendship; Stanford	Apex, NC
G	26	Taissa Queiroz	6 ft 1 in (1.85 m)	Fr	Cardinal Newman	Belo Horizonte, Brazil
C	34	Blanca Thomas	6 ft 5 in (1.96 m)	So	Charlotte Catholic	Charlotte, NC

Head coach

- Courtney Banghart (Dartmouth)

Assistant coach(es)

- Joanne Aluka-White (Middle Tennessee)
- Cory McNeill (Morgan State)
- Katherine Bixby (Ithaca)
- Daniel Metzelfeld (Trinity)
- Lexi Weger (Princeton)

Legend

- (C) Team captain
- (S) Suspended
- (I) Ineligible
- (W) Walk-on
- Injured
- Current redshirt

Roster
Last update: October 5, 2025

== Schedule and results ==
Date time, TV	Rank^{#}	Opponent^{#}	Result	Record	High points	High rebounds	High assists	Site (attendance) city, state
Exhibition
October 30, 2025*; 6:00 p.m	No. 11	vs. No. 2 South Carolina; Bad Boy Mowers Series - Atlanta	L 82–91	–	14 – Tied	10 – Harris	3 – Nivar	State Farm Arena (500); Atlanta, GA
Regular season
November 3, 2025*; 11:00 a.m., ACCNX	No. 11	North Carolina Central	W 90–42	1–0	15 – Brooks	11 – Toomey	3 – Aarnisalo	Carmichael Arena (6,336); Chapel Hill, NC
November 6, 2025*; 7:00 p.m., ACCNX	No. 11	Elon	W 71–37	2–0	13 – Nivar	13 – Toomey	4 – Tied	Carmichael Arena (3,111); Chapel Hill, NC
November 13, 2025*; 9:00 p.m., ESPN2	No. 11	vs. No. 3 UCLA; WBCA Challenge	L 60–78	2–1	13 – Aarnisalo	6 – Toomey	4 – Tied	Michelob Ultra Arena (1,588); Paradise, NV
November 15, 2025*; 6:00 p.m., ESPN+	No. 11	vs. Fairfield; WBCA Challenge	W 82–68	3–1	14 – Hull	7 – Harris	4 – Grant	Michelob Ultra Arena (2,116); Paradise, NV
November 20, 2025*; 7:00 p.m., FloCollege	No. 14	at North Carolina A&T	W 85–50	4–1	14 – Tied	10 – Nivar	3 – Tied	Corbett Sports Center; Greensboro, NC
November 23, 2025*; 6:00 p.m., ACCN	No. 14	UNC Greensboro	W 94–48	5–1	19 – Toomey	7 – Toomey	4 – Tied	Carmichael Arena (2,418); Chapel Hill, NC
November 27, 2025*; 11:00 a.m., FloCollege	No. 12	vs. South Dakota State; Cancún Challenge Mayan Tournament	W 83–48	6–1	14 – Tied	12 – Nivar	5 – Nivar	Hard Rock Hotel Riviera Maya; Cancún, MX
November 28, 2025; 11:00 a.m., FloCollege	No. 12	vs. Kansas State; Cancún Challenge Mayan Tournament	W 85–73	7–1	15 – Grant	7 – Tied	7 – Nivar	Hard Rock Hotel Riviera Maya (200); Cancún, MX
November 29, 2025; 1:30 p.m., FloCollege	No. 12	vs. Columbia; Cancún Challenge Mayan Tournament	W 80–63	8–1	19 – Grant	6 – Nivar	6 – Nivar	Hard Rock Hotel Riviera Maya; Cancún, MX
December 4, 2025*; 7:00 p.m., ESPN2	No. 11	at No. 2 Texas; ACC–SEC Challenge	L 64–79	8–2	17 – Nivar	8 – Toomey	3 – Nivar	Moody Center (9,020); Austin, TX
December 7, 2025*; 12:00 p.m., ACCN	No. 11	Boston University	W 82–40	9–2	14 – Aarnisalo	9 – Harris	4 – Tied	Carmichael Arena (3,139); Chapel Hill, NC
December 14, 2025; 4:00 p.m., ACCN	No. 12	No. 22 Louisville	L 66–76 ^{OT}	9–3 (0–1)	13 – Henderson	9 – Harris	4 – Kelly	Carmichael Arena (2,622); Chapel Hill, NC
December 17, 2025*; 8:00 p.m., ACCN	No. 18	UNC Wilmington	W 84–34	10–3	16 – Brooks	9 – Nivar	3 – Tied	Carmichael Arena (1,824); Chapel Hill, NC
December 21, 2025*; 2:00 p.m., ACCN	No. 18	Charleston Southern	W 93–74	11–3	19 – Brooks	6 – Tied	6 – Nivar	Carmichael Arena (2,369); Chapel Hill, NC
December 29, 2025; 8:00 p.m., ACCN	No. 16	at Boston College	W 90–39	12–3 (1–1)	19 – Harris	9 – Harris	5 – Grant	Conte Forum (1,213); Chestnut Hill, MA
January 1, 2026; 12:00 p.m., ACCN	No. 16	California	W 71–55	13–3 (2–1)	16 – Nivar	10 – Harris	6 – Nivar	Carmichael Arena (3,036); Chapel Hill, NC
January 4, 2026; 1:00 p.m., ESPN	No. 16	Stanford	L 71–77 ^{OT}	13–4 (2–2)	18 – Harris	7 – Tied	3 – Tied	Carmichael Arena (3,076); Chapel Hill, NC
January 11, 2026; 1:00 p.m., ESPN	No. 22	at Notre Dame	L 50–73	13–5 (2–3)	14 – Harris	8 – Harris	2 – Brooks	Purcell Pavilion (8,101); Notre Dame, IN
January 15, 2026; 7:00 p.m., ACCNX		Miami (FL)	W 73–62	14–5 (3–3)	24 – Kelly	6 – Tied	5 – Nivar	Carmichael Arena (3,320); Chapel Hill, NC
January 18, 2026; 2:00 p.m., The CW		at Florida State	W 82–55	15–5 (4–3)	14 – Grant	6 – Harris	6 – Nivar	Donald L. Tucker Center (1,518); Tallahassee, FL
January 22, 2026; 8:00 p.m., ACCN		at Georgia Tech	W 54–46	16–5 (5–3)	11 – Tied	15 – Toomey	4 – Aarnisalo	McCamish Pavilion (1,933); Atlanta, GA
January 25, 2026; 12:00 p.m., The CW		Syracuse	W 77–71 ^{OT}	17–5 (6–3)	21 – Harris	11 – Harris	5 – Kelly	Carmichael Arena (467); Chapel Hill, NC
February 2, 2026; 6:00 p.m., ESPN2	No. 25	at NC State; Rivalry	W 61–59	18–5 (7–3)	18 – Grant	9 – Harris	6 – Nivar	Reynolds Coliseum (5,500); Raleigh, NC
February 5, 2026; 6:00 p.m., ACCN	No. 25	Clemson	W 53–44	19–5 (8–3)	17 – Harris	10 – Harris	7 – Nivar	Carmichael Arena (3,024); Chapel Hill, NC
February 8, 2026; 2:00 p.m., ACCN	No. 25	at Wake Forest	W 84–56	20–5 (9–3)	21 – Brooks	8 – Nivar	7 – Nivar	LJVM Coliseum (2,284); Winston-Salem, NC
February 12, 2026; 6:00 p.m., ACCN	No. 21	SMU	W 94–42	21–5 (10–3)	15 – Grant	9 – Tied	5 – Tied	Carmichael Arena (2,450); Chapel Hill, NC
February 15, 2026; 1:00 p.m., ABC	No. 21	at No. 11 Duke; Rivalry	L 68–72	21–6 (10–4)	14 – Toomey	9 – Harris	5 – Tied	Cameron Indoor Stadium (9,314); Durham, NC
February 19, 2026; 6:00 p.m., ACCN	No. 22	at Virginia Tech	W 66–63 ^{OT}	22–6 (11–4)	15 – Harris	9 – Harris	5 – Aarnisalo	Cassell Coliseum (4,271); Blacksburg, VA
February 22, 2026; 12:00 p.m., ACCN	No. 22	Pittsburgh; Play4Kay	W 78–50	23–6 (12–4)	18 – Brooks	9 – Thomas	5 – Tied	Carmichael Arena (5,246); Chapel Hill, NC
February 26, 2026; 7:00 p.m., ACCNX	No. 21	at Virginia	W 82–70	24–6 (13–4)	20 – Aarnisalo	7 – Aarnisalo	7 – Nivar	John Paul Jones Arena (4,669); Charlottesville, VA
March 1, 2026; 12:00 p.m., ESPN	No. 21	No. 12 Duke; Rivalry	W 74–69	25–6 (14–4)	22 – Aarnisalo	8 – Toomey	4 – Aarnisalo	Carmichael Arena (6,319); Chapel Hill, NC
ACC tournament
March 6, 2026*; 7:30 p.m., ACCN	(3) No. 16	vs. (6) Virginia Tech; Quarterfinals	W 85–68	26–6	21 – Grant	10 – Harris	6 – Aarnisalo	Gas South Arena (6,572); Duluth, GA
March 7, 2026*; 2:30 p.m., ESPN2	(3) No. 16	vs. (2) No. 12 Louisville; Semifinals	L 57–65	26–7	17 – Aarnisalo	8 – Harris	5 – Aarnisalo	Gas South Arena (6,604); Duluth, GA
NCAA tournament
March 20, 2026*; 5:30 p.m., ESPNews	(4 FW1) No. 15	(13 FW1) Western Illinois; First Round	W 82–51	27–7	17 – Harris	12 – Harris	5 – Nivar	Carmichael Arena (2,390); Chapel Hill, NC
March 22, 2026*; 12:00 p.m., ESPN	(4 FW1) No. 15	(5 FW1) No. 17 Maryland; Second Round	W 74–66	28–7	21 – Aarnisalo	8 – Tied	3 – Grant	Carmichael Arena (2,470); Chapel Hill, NC
March 27, 2026*; 5:00 p.m., ESPN	(4 FW1) No. 15	vs. (1 FW1) No. 1 UConn; Sweet Sixteen	L 42–63	28–8	20 – Nivar	8 – Nivar	6 – Aarnisalo	Dickies Arena (9,375); Fort Worth, TX
*Non-conference game. ^{#}Rankings from AP poll. (#) Tournament seedings in parentheses. FW1=Fort Worth 1. All times are in Eastern.

== Rankings ==
Ranking movements Legend: ██ Increase in ranking ██ Decrease in ranking RV = Received votes
	Week																				
Poll	Pre	1	2	3	4	5	6	7	8	9	10	11	12	13	14	15	16	17	18	19	Final
AP	11	11	14	12	11	12	18	16	16*	22	RV	RV	RV	25	21	22	21	16	15	15	13
Coaches	11	8	12	10	10	11	16	15	15	18	23	21	23	21	21	22	19	16	15	15	13

*AP did not release a week 8 poll.
