= Stanford–Tennessee women's basketball rivalry =

American college basketball rivalry

- Stanford Cardinal Tennessee Lady Volunteers
- Sport: Women's basketball
- First meeting: December 18, 1988 #1 Tennessee 83, #5 Stanford 60
- Latest meeting: December 3, 2025 #19 Tennessee 65, Stanford 62
- Next meeting: TBD

Statistics
- Total meetings: 40
- All-time series: Tennessee leads, 26–14
- Largest victory: Tennessee; 105–69 (1994), 98–62 (1998)
- Longest win streak: Tennessee, 11 (1997–2006)
- Current win streak: Tennessee, 1 (2025–present)

The Stanford–Tennessee rivalry is a women's college basketball rivalry between the Tennessee Lady Vols and Stanford Cardinal women's basketball programs. The two schools are among the most storied in women's basketball history with Tennessee holding 8 national championships (2nd all-time) and Stanford with 3 (T–3rd all-time). Former Tennessee coach Pat Summitt and former Stanford head coach Tara VanDerveer are among the winningest coaches in the sport. They have played each season since 1988 with the exception of 2020, due to COVID-19 travel concerns and 2023 and 2024, with Tennessee leading the all-time series 26–14.

== Series History ==
The rivalry began in 1988 when both schools were at the top of women's basketball, with Tennessee claiming national championships in 1987, 1989, and 1991, with Stanford winning in 1990 and 1992. For Stanford, Tennessee is their most played non-conference opponent, while the series ranks fourth for Tennessee (behind series with Texas, Louisiana Tech and Old Dominion). The schools have met three times in the NCAA basketball tournament, playing in the 1991 Final Four, 2004 Elite 8, and in the 2008 national championship, all games won by Tennessee. They are the first (Tennessee) and fifth (Stanford) in all-time women's basketball wins, and throughout out their 39 meetings, at least one school has been ranked in the AP poll each time and both teams have been ranked 36 times. The two teams have met three teams as the #1 and #2 teams in the nation (twice in 1992, and 1994), with Tennessee leading 3–0 in these games. The rivalry long centered on the close friendship between legendary coaches Tara VanDerveer and Pat Summit, with the games carrying a strong level of respect between the programs. Tennessee dominated the early years of the rivalry highlighted by an eleven-game winning streak that ran from 1997 until 2006. Since the end of that run, Stanford has found more success against Tennessee, leading 10–6 since 2007, and holding a 7–4 advantage in games since Pat Summit's retirement at the end of the 2011–12 season. Tennessee won the most recent renewal of the rivalry in 2025, the first in the series without Tara VanDerveer, 65–62 as part of the ACC-SEC Challenge.

== Rival accomplishments ==
The following summarizes the accomplishments of the two programs.

Team	Stanford	Tennessee
National titles	3	8
Final Four appearances	15	18
Sweet 16 appearances	28	36
NCAA Tournament appearances	36	41
NCAA Tournament Record	100–33	130–33
First Team AP All-Americans	8	8
Naismith Players of the Year	2	4
Weeks in AP Top–25	619	771
All-time program record	1115–283	1183–266
All-time winning percentage	.798	.816

== Results ==
Stanford victories	Tennessee victories

No.	Date	Location	Winning team		Losing team	
1	December 18, 1988	Knoxville, TN	#1 Tennessee	83	#5 Stanford	60
2	December 15, 1989	Stanford, CA	#3 Stanford	81	#2 Tennessee	71
3	November 25, 1990	Knoxville, TN	#6 Tennessee	95	#2 Stanford	80
4	December 30, 1990	Hilton Head Island, SC	#7 Tennessee	84	#8 Stanford	77
5	March 30, 1991	New Orleans, LA	#4 Tennessee	68	#11 Stanford	60
6	December 14, 1991	Stanford, CA	#3 Stanford	96	#1 Tennessee	95^{OT}
7	December 6, 1992	Honolulu, HI	#2 Tennessee	74	#1 Stanford	73^{OT}
8	December 21, 1992	Knoxville, TN	#1 Tennessee	84	#2 Stanford	79
9	December 3, 1993	Stanford, CA	#1 Tennessee	81	#9 Stanford	75
10	December 1, 1994	Knoxville, TN	#1 Tennessee	105	#2 Stanford	69
11	December 16, 1995	Stanford, CA	#9 Stanford	90	#2 Tennessee	72
12	December 15, 1996	Knoxville, TN	#1 Stanford	82	#5 Tennessee	65
13	November 29, 1997	San Jose, CA	#1 Tennessee	88	#11 Stanford	70
14	December 19, 1998	Knoxville, TN	#2 Tennessee	98	Stanford	62
15	November 26, 1999	Stanford, CA	#5 Tennessee	79	#23 Stanford	73
16	December 17, 2000	Knoxville, TN	#2 Tennessee	63	#15 Stanford	58
17	December 16, 2001	Stanford, CA	#2 Tennessee	68	#6 Stanford	62
18	December 18, 2002	Knoxville, TN	#4 Tennessee	71	#5 Stanford	56
19	December 14, 2003	Stanford, CA	#2 Tennessee	70	#6 Stanford	66^{OT}
20	March 30, 2004	Norman, OK	#2 Tennessee	62	#10 Stanford	60
21	December 21, 2004	Knoxville, TN	#9 Tennessee	70	#2 Stanford	67
22	December 4, 2005	Stanford, CA	#2 Tennessee	74	#12 Stanford	67
23	November 24, 2006	Knoxville, TN	#4 Tennessee	77	#11 Stanford	60
24	December 22, 2007	Stanford, CA	#5 Stanford	73	#1 Tennessee	69^{OT}
25	April 8, 2008	Tampa, FL	#3 Tennessee	64	#4 Stanford	48
26	December 21, 2008	Knoxville, TN	#11 Tennessee	79	#3 Stanford	69^{OT}
27	December 19, 2009	Stanford, CA	#2 Stanford	67	#3 Tennessee	52
28	December 19, 2010	Knoxville, TN	#6 Tennessee	82	#3 Stanford	72^{OT}
29	December 20, 2011	Stanford, CA	#4 Stanford	97	#6 Tennessee	80
30	December 22, 2012	Knoxville, TN	#1 Stanford	73	#10 Tennessee	60
31	December 21, 2013	Stanford, CA	#3 Stanford	76	#6 Tennessee	70
32	December 20, 2014	Knoxville, TN	#11 Tennessee	59	#7 Stanford	40
33	December 16, 2015	Stanford, CA	#15 Stanford	69	#14 Tennessee	55
34	December 18, 2016	Knoxville, TN	Tennessee	59	#10 Stanford	51
35	December 21, 2017	Stanford, CA	#7 Tennessee	83	#18 Stanford	71
36	December 18, 2018	Knoxville, TN	#8 Stanford	95	#9 Tennessee	85
37	December 18, 2019	Stanford, CA	#1 Stanford	78	#23 Tennessee	51
38	December 18, 2021	Knoxville, TN	#3 Stanford	74	#7 Tennessee	63
39	December 18, 2022	Stanford, CA	#2 Stanford	77	Tennessee	70
40	December 3, 2025	Stanford, CA	#19 Tennessee	65	Stanford	62
Series: Tennessee leads 26–14
