= Jazzy Davidson =

American basketball player (born 2006)

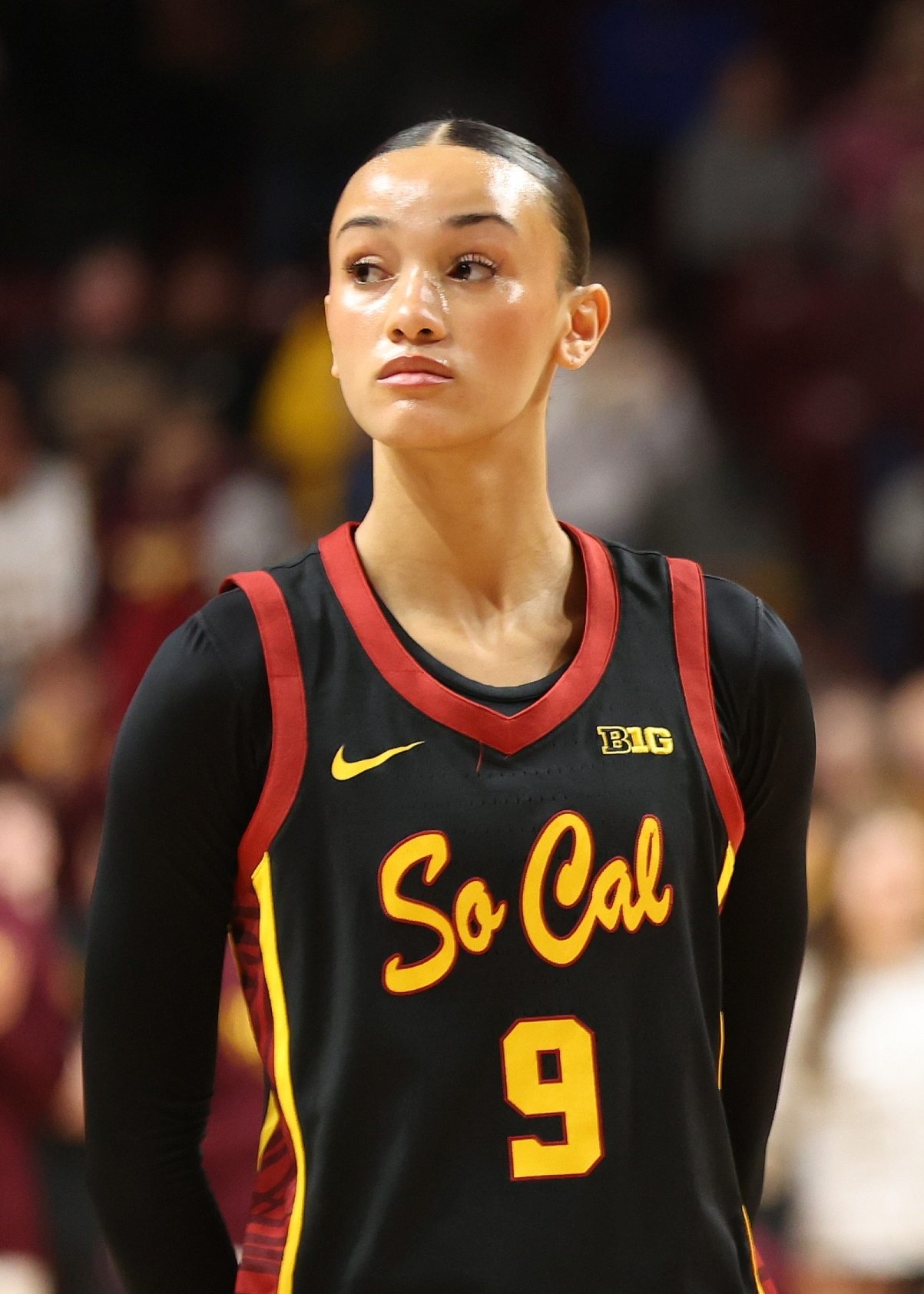
- Davidson with USC in 2026

No. 9 – USC Trojans
- Position: Guard
- League: Big Ten Conference

Personal information
- Born: November 6, 2006 (age 20) Portland, Oregon, U.S.
- Listed height: 6 ft 1 in (1.85 m)

Career information
- High school: Clackamas (Clackamas, Oregon)
- College: USC (2025–present)

Career highlights
- USBWA National Freshman of the Year (2026); WBCA Freshman of the Year (2026); Big Ten Freshman of the Year (2026); First-team All-Big Ten (2026); Big Ten All-Defensive Team (2026); Big Ten All-Freshman Team (2026); McDonald's All-American (2025); Nike Hoop Summit (2025)
Medals
Women's basketball
Representing the United States
FIBA Under-19 World Cup
Gold medal – first place	2025 Czech Republic	Team
FIBA Under-18 Women's AmeriCup
Gold medal – first place	2024 Colombia	Team
Women's 3x3 basketball
Representing the United States
FIBA 3x3 U18 World Cup
Gold medal – first place	2024 Hungary	Team

Jasmine "Jazzy" Omolade Davidson (born November 6, 2006) is an American college basketball player for the USC Trojans of the Big Ten Conference. She was named the USBWA National Freshman of the Year in 2026. She attended Clackamas High School and was a five-star recruit and one of the top players in the 2025 class.

== High school career ==
Davidson played basketball for Clackamas High School in Clackamas, Oregon. During her freshman year, she averaged 22.2 points, 8.3 rebounds, 4.1 steals, 2.7 assists and 1.4 blocks per game. She recorded nine double-doubles and was named the Oregon Gatorade Player of the Year. During her sophomore year, she averaged 22.8 points, 7.1 rebounds, 2.6 steals, 2.3 assists and 1.3 blocks per game, and was named the Oregon Gatorade Player of the Year for the second consecutive year.

During her junior year, she averaged 26.4 points, 7.7 rebounds, 3.8 steals, 2.6 assists and 1.0 blocks per game and was named the Oregon Gatorade Player of the Year for the third consecutive year. She helped lead the Cavaliers to the 2023 Class 6A state championship, their first championship in school history.

During her senior year, she averaged 29.3 points, 8.7 rebounds, 3.3 steals, 2.6 assists and 1.9 blocks per game. Following the season she was named Oregon Gatorade Player of the Year for the fourth consecutive year, and a finalist for Gatorade National Girls Basketball Player of the Year, along with Sienna Betts and Aaliyah Chavez. She finished her high school career as the all-time leading scorer in Oregon's Class 6A history with 2,726 points. On January 27, 2025, she was selected to play in the 2025 McDonald's All-American Girls Game. She also participated in the 2025 Nike Hoop Summit, where she recorded a game-high 17 points, along with seven rebounds, six assists, three steals and three blocks.

=== Recruiting ===
Davidson was considered a five-star recruit and the No. 1 player in the 2025 class by ESPN. On September 24, 2024, she verbally committed to play college basketball at USC, over offers from UConn, UCLA, TCU and Duke. On November 13, 2024, she signed her national letter of intent to play for USC.

== College career ==
=== Freshman season ===
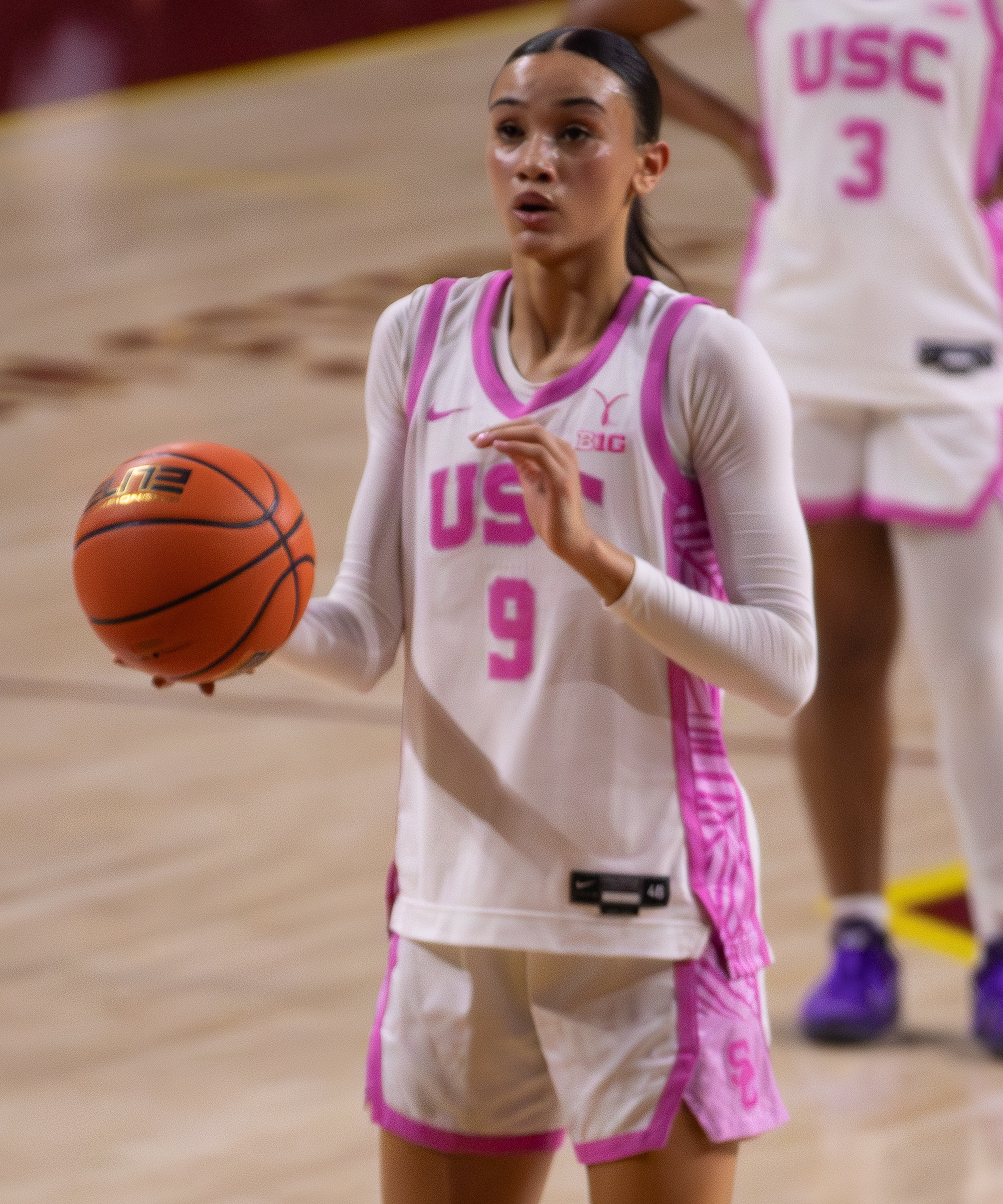
Davidson in 2026

Davidson made her collegiate debut on November 4, 2025, against New Mexico State and recorded 14 points, five rebounds, four assists, a steal and a block. On November 15, 2025, against No. 9 NC State she scored a then-career-high 21 points, with five blocks, four assists and three steals. She scored the game-winning layup with eight seconds remaining to upset NC State 69–68. She was subsequently named Co-Big Ten Freshman of the Week. On November 25, 2025, against Tennessee Tech she recorded 20 points and 16 rebounds for her first career double-double. Her 16 rebounds were the most by a Trojan freshman since Rayah Marshall on December 18, 2021. On November 28, 2025, against Pepperdine, she recorded 18 points, five assists, four rebounds and three blocks, and earned her second Big Ten Freshman of the Week honor. On December 7, 2025, in the Big Ten Conference opener against No. 21 Washington she recorded 22 points and 12 rebounds for her second career double-double. On December 18, 2025, against Cal Poly, she recorded 17 points, nine rebounds, four assists and a career-high six steals. The next game against California on December 21, she scored a then-career-high 24 points, with four rebounds, four blocks, two assists and two steals, and earned her third Big Ten Freshman of the Week honor.

On January 6, 2026, against Oregon, she recorded 14 points and 13 rebounds for her third double-double of the season. On January 29, 2026, against No. 8 Iowa, she recorded 21 points, eight assists, four rebounds and two steals in an 81–69 upset victory. The next game against Rutgers on February 1, 2026, she recorded 16 points, nine rebounds, five assists and three steals, and earned her fourth Big Ten Freshman of the Week honor. On February 5, 2026, against Northwestern, she recorded 21 points, six assists, three rebounds, two steals and a block. On February 8, 2026, against Illinois, she scored a then-career-high 27 points with eight rebounds and eight assists, and earned her fifth Big Ten Freshman of the Week honor. On February 12, 2026, against Indiana, she recorded 24 points, six rebounds, three steals, three assists and two blocks. This was her 22nd consecutive game scoring in double figures and tenth time scoring 20-plus points. She subsequently earned her sixth Big Ten Freshman of the Week honor. On February 19, 2026, against Wisconsin, she recorded 24 points, six assists, five rebounds, four steals and three blocks. On February 22, 2026, against Ohio State, she scored a career-high 32 points, on a career-high six three-pointers. She became the first USC freshman to score 30 or more points since JuJu Watkins on March 8, 2024. She subsequently earned her fourth consecutive Big Ten Freshman of the Week honor, and seventh overall.

She finished the 2025–26 regular season leading USC in every major statistical category, including points (17.9), rebounds (5.9), assists (4.3), steals (2.0) and blocks per game (2.1), becoming the only Division I player this season to accomplish this feat. Following an outstanding season she was named Big Ten Freshman of the Year, and was a unanimous first-team All-Big Ten, Big Ten All-Defensive team and Big Ten All-Freshman team selection. She was the only freshman selected to both the All-Big Ten and All-Defensive teams. During the first round of the 2026 NCAA Division I women's basketball tournament against Clemson she scored 31 points, six rebounds and five assists. She became the first freshman in the last 25 years to post a 30-point, 5-rebound, 5-assist stat line in an NCAA tournament debut. Her 31 points were the most ever by a USC freshman in NCAA tournament play and the second most by any Trojan in NCAA tournament history. She finished her freshman season with 574 points, 179 rebounds, 132 assists, 64 steals and 63 blocks, averaging 17.9 points, 5.6 rebounds, 4.1 assists, 2.0 steals and 2.0 blocks per game. She joined Maya Moore, Cheryl Miller, Candace Parker, JuJu Watkins and Sarah Strong, as the only freshmen to record at least 500 points, 150 rebounds, 100 assists, 50 steals and 50 blocks in a single season. She scored in double figures in 30 of 32 games, including a streak of 26 straight from November 18 through March 1. She recorded 14 games of 20 or more points and posted two 30-point performances. Following the season she was named the USBWA National Freshman of the Year and WBCA Freshman of the Year.

== National team career ==
On May 18, 2024, Davidson was named to the United States under-18 national team for the 2024 FIBA U18 Women's AmeriCup. During the tournament she averaged 11.3 points, 3.8 rebounds, 3.2 assists, 1.3 blocks and a team-high 2.7 steals per game. During the final against Canada she recorded nine points, four assists, two rebounds, a steal and a block to help the United States win a gold medal.

On June 20, 2025, she was named to the United States under-19 national team for the 2025 FIBA Under-19 Women's Basketball World Cup. On July 15, 2025, in a game against Israel, she recorded 24 points, eight assists, four steals and four rebounds in 23 minutes. She set team USA's under-19 efficiency record of 40. She finished the tournament averaging 14.6 points, 4.1 rebounds, 3.9 assists, 3.0 steals and 1.4 blocks per game. During the final against Australia, she scored 21 points, six rebounds, three assists, five steals and three blocks to help the United States win a gold medal. She was subsequently named to the FIBA U19 World Cup All-Second Team.

== Career statistics ==
Legend
GP	Games played	GS	Games started	MPG	Minutes per game	RPG	Rebounds per game
APG	Assists per game	SPG	Steals per game	BPG	Blocks per game	PPG	Points per game
TO	Turnovers per game	FG%	Field-goal percentage	3P%	3-point field-goal percentage	FT%	Free-throw percentage
**Bold**	Career best	°	League leader

=== College ===
Year	Team	GP	GS	MPG	FG%	3P%	FT%	RPG	APG	SPG	BPG	TO	PPG
2025–26	USC	32	32	34.5	40.0	29.6	72.8	5.6	4.1	2.0	2.0	3.0	17.9
**Career**		32	32	34.5	40.0	29.6	72.8	5.6	4.1	2.0	2.0	3.0	17.9
Statistics retrieved from Sports-Reference

== Personal life ==
Since 2025, Davidson has been in a relationship with Nate Ament, who was drafted 13th overall by the Milwaukee Bucks in the 2026 NBA draft.
