= 2025 McDonald's All-American Girls Game =

Basketball game

West	East
104	82
- Date: April 1, 2025
- Venue: Barclays Center, Brooklyn, New York
- MVP: Sienna Betts
- Network: ESPN

McDonald's All-American

The 2025 McDonald's All-American Girls Game was an all-star basketball game that was played on April 1, 2025, at the Barclays Center in Brooklyn, New York. The game's rosters featured the best and most highly recruited high school girls graduating in the class of 2025. The game was the 23rd annual version of the McDonald's All-American Game first played in 2002. The 24 players were selected from over 700 nominees by a committee of basketball experts. They were chosen not only for their on-court skills, but for their performances off the court as well.

== Rosters ==
The roster was announced on January 27, 2025. Tennessee and Stanford had the most selections with three each, while LSU had two.

=== Team East ===
ESPNW 100 Rank	Name	Height	Position	Hometown	High school	College choice
20	Nyla Brooks	6–1	W	Alexandria, Virginia	Bishop Ireton High School	North Carolina
15	Kaelyn Carroll	6–2	W	Marion, Massachusetts	Tabor Academy	Kentucky
32	Jaida Civil	6–0	G	Vero Beach, Florida	Palm Bay Magnet High School	Tennessee
5	Aaliyah Crump	6–1	G	Minnetonka, Minnesota	Montverde Academy	Texas
17	Jaliya Davis	6–2	F	Overland Park, Kansas	Blue Valley North High School	Kansas
13	ZaKiyah Johnson	6–0	G	Shelbyville, Kentucky	Sacred Heart Academy	LSU
19	Leah Macy	6–2	F	Elizabethtown, Kentucky	Bethlehem High School	Notre Dame
4	Agot Makeer	6–1	W	Thunder Bay, Ontario	Montverde Academy	South Carolina
11	Mia Pauldo	5–5	G	Denville, New Jersey	Morris Catholic High School	Tennessee
14	Deniya Prawl	6–1	W	Toronto, Ontario	IMG Academy	Tennessee
16	Lara Somfai	6–4	F	Bradenton, Florida	IMG Academy	Stanford
9	Hailee Swain	5–10	G	Atlanta, Georgia	Holy Innocents' Episcopal School	Stanford

=== Team West ===
ESPNW 100 Rank	Name	Height	Position	Hometown	High school	College choice
8	Darianna Alexander	6–1	G	Cincinnati, Ohio	Purcell Marian High School	Cincinnati
2	Sienna Betts	6–4	F	Aurora, Colorado	Grandview High School	UCLA
1	Aaliyah Chavez	5–11	G	Lubbock, Texas	Monterey High School	Oklahoma
3	Jasmine Davidson	6–1	G	Clackamas, Oregon	Clackamas High School	USC
18	Addison Deal	6–0	G	Ladera Ranch, California	Mater Dei High School	Iowa
31	Alexandra Eschmeyer	6–5	F	Lafayette, Colorado	Peak to Peak Charter School	Stanford
6	Grace Knox	6–2	W	Etiwanda, California	Etiwanda High School	LSU
22	Ayla McDowell	6–2	W	Cypress, Texas	Cypress Springs High School	South Carolina
21	Brynn McGaughy	6–2	F	Spokane, Washington	Central Valley High School	Washington
24	Aliyahna Morris	5–5	G	Etiwanda, California	Etiwanda High School	California
7	Emilee Skinner	6–0	G	Millville, Utah	Ridgeline High School	Duke
10	Jordan Speiser	6–1	G	Warrenton, Missouri	Lutheran High School	Kansas State
