= Texas Miss Basketball =

The Texas Miss Basketball honor recognizes the top high school basketball player in the state of Texas. The award is presented annually by the Texas Association of Basketball Coaches.

== Award winners ==
Year	Player	High School	College	WNBA draft
2025	Aaliyah Chavez	Monterey	Oklahoma	
2024	Arianna Roberson	Clark	Duke	
2023	Julianna LaMendola	Coppell	Indiana	
2022				
2021	Rori Harmon	Cy Creek	Texas	
2020	Hannah Gusters	Irving MacArthur	UCF/Oklahoma St./LSU/Baylor	
2019	Nyah Green	Allen	Duke/Louisville	
2018	Charli Collier	Barbers Hill	Texas	2021 WNBA draft: 1st Rnd, 1st overall by the Dallas Wings
2017	Chasity Patterson	North Shore	Kentucky/Texas	
2016	Joyner Holmes	Cedar Hill	Texas	2020 WNBA draft: 2nd Rnd, 19th overall by the Seattle Storm
2015				
2014	Brianna Turner	Manvel	Notre Dame	2019 WNBA draft: 1st Rnd, 11th overall by the Atlanta Dream
2013	Ariel Atkins	Duncanville	Texas	2018 WNBA draft: 1st Rnd, 7th overall by the Washington Mystics
2012	Alexis Jones	Irving MacArthur	Duke/Baylor	2017 WNBA draft: 1st Rnd, 12th overall by the Minnesota Lynx
2011	Alexis Jones	Irving MacArthur	Duke/Baylor	2017 WNBA draft: 1st Rnd, 12th overall by the Minnesota Lynx
2010	Chiney Ogwumike	Cy-Fair	Stanford	2014 WNBA draft: 1st Rnd, 1st overall by the Connecticut Sun
2009	Brittney Griner	Aldine Nimitz	Baylor	2013 WNBA draft: 1st Rnd, 1st overall by the Phoenix Mercury
2008	Nneka Ogwumike	Cy-Fair	Stanford	2012 WNBA draft: 1st Rnd, 1st overall by the Los Angeles Sparks
2007	Nneka Ogwumike	Cy-Fair	Stanford	2012 WNBA draft: 1st Rnd, 1st overall by the Los Angeles Sparks
2006	Brittainy Raven	North Crowley	Texas	2010 WNBA draft: 3rd Rnd, 33rd overall by the Atlanta Dream
2005	Jessica Morrow	Humble	Baylor	2009 WNBA draft: 3rd Rnd, 27th overall by the Atlanta Dream
2004	Tyeisha Jackson	Westfield	Purdue/Houston	
2003	Tiffany Jackson	Duncanville	Texas	2007 WNBA draft: 1st Rnd, 5th overall by the New York Liberty
2002	Erin Grant	Mansfield	Texas Tech	2006 WNBA draft: 3rd Rnd, 39th overall by the Seattle Storm
2001	Sara Hinkley	Winnsboro	Houston	
2000	Shereka Wright	Copperas Cove	Purude	2004 WNBA draft: 1st Rnd, 13th overall by the Detroit Shock
1999	Tai Dillard	SA Houston	Texas	
1998	Amber Tarr	Ozona	Texas Tech	
1997	Tamika Catchings	Duncanville	Tennessee	2001 WNBA draft: 1st Rnd, 3rd overall by the Indiana Fever
1996	Melinda Schumucker	Nazareth	Texas Tech	
1995	Julie Lake	Duncanville	Texas Tech	
1994	Netti Respondek	Terry	Vanderbilt	
1993	Laurie Weathers	Flour Bluff	Colorado	
1992	Kim Brandl	Lockhart	Texas	
1991	Cobi Kennedy	Duncanville	Texas	
1990	Lynn Corn	Abilene Wylie		
1989	Trena Tillis	Grapeland	SFA	
1988	Stacey McPherson	Godley		
1987	Terri Meyer	Levelland	La. Tech	
1986	Nadine Tieman	Priddy		
1985	Clarissa Davis	Northside Jay	Texas	1999 WNBA draft: 2nd Rnd, 22nd overall by the Phoenix Mercury
1984	Angela Lawson	Longview	La. Tech	

=== Schools with multiple winners ===
School	Number of Awards	Years
Duncanville	5	1991, 1995, 1997, 2003, 2013
Cy-Fair	3	2007, 2008, 2010
Irving MacArthur	3	2011, 2012, 2020

== Other versions ==
=== Dave Campbell's Texas Basketball ===
First awarded in 2022 by Dave Campbell's Texas Basketball magazine.

Year	Player	High School	College	WNBA draft
2024–25	Aaliyah Chavez	Monterey	Oklahoma	
2023–24	Aaliyah Chavez	Monterey	Oklahoma	
2022-23	Jalynn Bristow	Holliday	Iowa State	
2021-22	Bailey Maupin	Gruver	Texas Tech	

== See also ==
- Texas Mr. Basketball
