= 2025–26 Notre Dame Fighting Irish women's basketball team =

Intercollegiate basketball season

2025–26 Notre Dame Fighting Irish women's basketball

NCAA tournament, Elite Eight
- Conference: Atlantic Coast Conference

Ranking
- Coaches: No. 14
- AP: No. 9
- Record: 25–11 (12–6 ACC)
- Head coach: Niele Ivey (6th season)
- Associate head coach: Carol Owens (26th season)
- Assistant coaches: Michaela Mabrey (7th season); Charel Allen (4th season); Carlos Knox (1st season)
- Home arena: Purcell Pavilion

2025–26 ACC women's basketball standings
| | Conf. | | | | Overall |
| Team | W | | L | PCT | W | | L | PCT |
|---|---|---|---|---|---|---|---|---|
| No. 5 Duke † | 16 | – | 2 | .889 | 27 | – | 9 | .750 |
| No. 11 Louisville | 15 | – | 3 | .833 | 29 | – | 8 | .784 |
| No. 13 North Carolina | 14 | – | 4 | .778 | 28 | – | 8 | .778 |
| NC State | 13 | – | 5 | .722 | 21 | – | 11 | .656 |
| No. 9 Notre Dame | 12 | – | 6 | .667 | 25 | – | 10 | .714 |
| Virginia Tech | 12 | – | 6 | .667 | 23 | – | 10 | .697 |
| Syracuse | 12 | – | 6 | .667 | 24 | – | 9 | .727 |
| No. 19 Virginia | 11 | – | 7 | .611 | 22 | – | 12 | .647 |
| Clemson | 11 | – | 7 | .611 | 21 | – | 12 | .636 |
| California | 9 | – | 9 | .500 | 21 | – | 15 | .583 |
| Georgia Tech | 8 | – | 10 | .444 | 14 | – | 19 | .424 |
| Miami (FL) | 8 | – | 10 | .444 | 18 | – | 15 | .545 |
| Stanford | 8 | – | 10 | .444 | 21 | – | 14 | .600 |
| Florida State | 5 | – | 13 | .278 | 10 | – | 21 | .323 |
| Wake Forest | 4 | – | 14 | .222 | 14 | – | 18 | .438 |
| SMU | 2 | – | 16 | .111 | 9 | – | 21 | .300 |
| Pittsburgh | 1 | – | 17 | .056 | 8 | – | 23 | .258 |
| Boston College | 1 | – | 17 | .056 | 5 | – | 26 | .161 |
† 2026 ACC tournament winner Rankings from AP Poll

The 2025–26 Notre Dame Fighting Irish women's basketball team represented the University of Notre Dame during the 2025–26 NCAA Division I women's basketball season. The Fighting Irish were led by sixth-year head coach Niele Ivey and played their home games at Purcell Pavilion in Notre Dame, Indiana as members of the Atlantic Coast Conference.

The Fighting Irish began the season ranked fifteenth in the polls and fell to eighteenth after winning their first two games. As the eighteenth-ranked team, they defeated Akron before losing by thirty-nine points to fourteenth-ranked Michigan in the Citi Shamrock Classic. They fell to twenty-fourth in the rankings but rebounded with a two-point defeat of eleventh-ranked USC. They climbed back to eighteenth in the rankings before losing to thirteenth-ranked Ole Miss in the ACC–SEC Challenge. They opened ACC play with a defeat of Florida State. The win sparked a five-game winning streak, which included another ACC win over Pittsburgh. Still as the eighteenth-ranked team, the Irish opened 2026 with two losses, one against Georgia Tech by five points in overtime and one against Duke. These losses saw the team fall out of the rankings. Defeats of Boston College and twenty-second-ranked North Carolina saw them climb back to twenty-third in the rankings. The team quickly fell back out of the rankings after losing to ninth-ranked Louisville. They suffered a thirty-seven-point loss to rivals and top-ranked UConn. These two games were part of a 1–4 stretch for the team. Their only victory was over Miami. They Fighting Irish did not let the streak affect them in the long run, as they finished the season on a 7–1 streak. They only loss over the stretch was an eleven-point defeat at Virginia. Notre Dame finished the regular season with a three-points victory over tenth-ranked Louisville.

The Fighting Irish finished the regular season 20–9 overall and 12–6 in ACC play to finish in a three-way tie for fifth place. As the fifth seed in the ACC tournament, earned a bye into the Second Round, where they defeated twelfth seed Miami, 69–54. They defeated fourth seed NC State in the quarterfinals before falling to thirteenth-ranked and top seed Duke in the semifinals, 63–65. They received an at-large bid to the NCAA tournament and were the six-seed in the Fort Worth 1 regional. They were ranked twenty-second in the AP poll at the start of the tournament. They defeated eleven-seed Fairfield and three-seed and twelfth-ranked Ohio State to advance to the Sweet Sixteen. There they faced two-seed and sixth-ranked Vanderbilt. Notre Dame completed the upset 67–64 to advance to the Elite Eight. Their cinderella run ended there, with a defeat against rival, top-seed, and top-ranked UConn, for the second time during the season. The Fighting Irish finished the season with a 25–1 record, and ranked ninth in the AP poll and fourteenth in the Coaches polls.

== Previous season ==
The Fighting Irish finished the regular season 25–4 overall and 16–2 in ACC play to finish in a tie for first place. As the second seed in the ACC tournament, earned a bye into the quarterfinals, where they defeated seventh seed California, 73–64. They were defeated in the semifinals by third seed and eleventh-ranked Duke. They received an at-large bid to the NCAA tournament and were the three-seed in the Birmingham 3 region. They defeated fourteen-seed Stephen F. Austin and six-seed Michigan at home to advance to the Sweet Sixteen. There they faced two seed and sixth-ranked TCU in a rematch of their Cayman Islands Classic game. They lost again to TCU, this time 71–62, to end their season. The Fighting Irish finished the season with a 28–6 record, and ranked tenth in the AP poll and ninth in the Coaches polls.

== Offseason ==
=== Departures ===
Notre Dame departures
| Name | Number | Pos. | Height | Year | Hometown | Reason for departure |
|---|---|---|---|---|---|---|
| Emma Risch | 2 | G | 6'1" | Sophomore | Melbourne, Florida | Transferred to Florida State |
| Olivia Miles | 5 | G | 5'6" | Graduate student | Phillipsburg, New Jersey | Transferred to TCU |
| Sonia Citron | 11 | G | 6'1" | Senior | Eastchester, New York | Graduated; drafted 3rd overall in the 2025 WNBA draft |
| Kate Koval | 13 | F | 6'5" | Freshman | Kyiv, Ukraine | Transferred to LSU |
| Liatu King | 20 | F | 6'0" | Graduate student | Washington, D.C. | Graduated; drafted 28th overall in the 2025 WNBA draft |
| Maddy Westbeld | 21 | F | 6'3" | Senior | Kettering, Ohio | Graduated; drafted 16th overall in the 2025 WNBA draft |
| Kylee Watson | 22 | F | 6'4" | Senior | Linwood, New Jersey | Transferred to Villanova |
| Sarah Cernugel | 25 | G | 5'4" | (redshirt) Senior | Westmont, Illinois | Graduated |
| Liza Karlen | 32 | F | 6'2" | Graduate student | Saint Paul, Minnesota | Graduated |

=== Incoming transfers ===
Notre Dame incoming transfers
| Name | Number | Pos. | Height | Year | Hometown | Previous school |
|---|---|---|---|---|---|---|
| Kelly Ratigan | 1 | G | 5'8" | Junior | South Bend, Indiana | Loyola (MD) |
| Vanessa de Jesus | 2 | G | 5'8" | Graduate student | Valencia, California | Duke |
| Malaya Cowles | 5 | F | 6'3" | Graduate student | Wilkesboro, North Carolina | Wake Forest |
| Jordyn Smith | 11 | G | 5'6" | Graduate student | Granger, Indiana | Holy Cross College |
| Iyana Moore | 23 | G | 5'8" | Graduate student | Milwaukee, Wisconsin | Vanderbilt |
| Gisela Sanchez | 30 | F | 6'4" | Graduate student | Barcelona, Spain | Kansas State |

=== Recruiting class ===
College recruiting
| Name | Hometown | School | Height | Weight | Commit date |
|---|---|---|---|---|---|
| Leah Macy; F | Elizabethtown, Kentucky | Bethlehem | 6 ft 4 in (1.93 m) | N/A | Jun 1, 2024 |
| Leah Macy; F | Recruit ratings: ESPN: (96) | | | | |
Overall recruit ranking:
Note: In many cases, Scout, Rivals, 247Sports, On3, and ESPN may conflict in their listings of height and weight.; In these cases, the average was taken. ESPN grades are on a 100-point scale.; Sources:

== Roster ==
2025–26 Notre Dame Fighting Irish women's basketball team
Players
Coaches

| Pos. | # | Name | Height | Year | Previous school | Hometown |
|---|---|---|---|---|---|---|
| G | 1 | Kelly Ratigan | 5 ft 8 in (1.73 m) | Jr | St. Joseph; Loyola (MD) | South Bend, IN |
| G | 2 | Vanessa de Jesus | 5 ft 8 in (1.73 m) | GS | Sierra Canyon; Duke | Valencia, CA |
| G | 3 | Hannah Hidalgo | 5 ft 6 in (1.68 m) | Jr | Paul VI | Merchantville, NJ |
| F | 5 | Malaya Cowles | 6 ft 3 in (1.91 m) | GS | Winston-Salem Christian; Wake Forest | Wilkesboro, NC |
| G | 8 | Cassandre Prosper | 6 ft 3 in (1.91 m) | Sr | Cairine Wilson | Montreal, QC |
| F | 10 | Bella Tehrani (W) | 6 ft 3 in (1.91 m) | Sr | St. Jean de Brebeuf | Hamilton, ON |
| G | 11 | Jordyn Smith | 5 ft 6 in (1.68 m) | GS | Penn; Holy Cross College | Granger, IN |
| G | 14 | KK Bransford | 5 ft 11 in (1.8 m) | Sr | Mount Notre Dame | Cincinnati, OH |
| G | 15 | Luci Jensen (W) | 5 ft 10 in (1.78 m) | So | Brookfield Academy | Brookfield, WI |
| G | 23 | Iyana Moore | 5 ft 8 in (1.73 m) | GS | Blackman; Vanderbilt | Milwaukee, WI |
| F | 30 | Gisela Sanchez | 6 ft 4 in (1.93 m) | GS | Segle XXI; Kansas State | Barcelona, Spain |
| F | 44 | Leah Macy | 6 ft 2 in (1.88 m) | Fr | Bethlehem | Elizabethtown, KY |

Head coach

- Niele Ivey (Notre Dame)

Assistant coach(es)

- Carol Owens (Northern Illinois)
- Michaela Mabrey (Notre Dame)
- Charel Allen (Notre Dame)
- Carlos Knox (IUPUI)

Legend

- (C) Team captain
- (S) Suspended
- (I) Ineligible
- (W) Walk-on
- Injured
- Current redshirt

Roster

== Schedule and results ==
| Date time, TV | Rank^{#} | Opponent^{#} | Result | Record | High points | High rebounds | High assists | Site (attendance) city, state |
Exhibition
| October 30, 2025*; 7:00 p.m. | No. 15 | Purdue Northwest | W 119–54 | – | 39 – Hidalgo | – | – | Purcell Pavilion; Notre Dame, IN |
Regular season
| November 5, 2025*; 7:00 p.m., ACCNX | No. 15 | Fairleigh Dickinson | W 98–52 | 1–0 | 27 – Hidalgo | 12 – Sanchez | 5 – Prosper | Purcell Pavilion (6,156); Notre Dame, IN |
| November 9, 2025*; 3:00 p.m., ACCNX | No. 15 | Chicago State | W 116–58 | 2–0 | 32 – Hidalgo | 13 – Bransford | 8 – Hidalgo | Purcell Pavilion (8,143); Notre Dame, IN |
| November 12, 2025*; 7:00 p.m., ACCNX | No. 18 | Akron | W 85–58 | 3–0 | 44 – Hidalgo | 9 – Hidalgo | 4 – Tied | Purcell Pavilion (6,255); Notre Dame, IN |
| November 15, 2025*; 4:00 p.m., NBC | No. 18 | vs. No. 14 Michigan; Citi Shamrock Classic | L 54–93 | 3–1 | 17 – Prosper | 8 – Prosper | 4 – Hidalgo | Wayne State Fieldhouse (2,200); Detroit, MI |
| November 21, 2025*; 6:00 p.m., ESPN | No. 24 | No. 11 USC | W 61–59 | 4–1 | 22 – Hidalgo | 8 – Bransford | 4 – de Jesus | Purcell Pavilion (8,342); Notre Dame, IN |
| November 24, 2025*; 9:00 p.m., ACCN | No. 19 | Central Michigan | W 83–51 | 5–1 | 25 – Hidalgo | 7 – Cowles | 7 – Hidalgo | Purcell Pavilion (6,387); Notre Dame, IN |
| December 4, 2025*; 9:00 p.m., ESPN2 | No. 18 | at No. 13 Ole Miss; ACC–SEC Challenge | L 62–69 | 5–2 | 28 – Hidalgo | 5 – Cowles | 6 – de Jesus | SJB Pavilion (3,468); Oxford, MS |
| December 7, 2025; 2:00 p.m., ACCNX | No. 18 | at Florida State | W 93–60 | 6–2 (1–0) | 21 – Prosper | 13 – Cowles | 9 – Hidalgo | Donald L. Tucker Center (1,986); Tallahassee, FL |
| December 11, 2025*; 7:00 p.m., ACCNX | No. 19 | Morehead State | W 97–48 | 7–2 | 26 – Hidalgo | 13 – Prosper | 5 – de Jesus | Purcell Pavilion (6,405); Notre Dame, IN |
| December 14, 2025*; 4:00 p.m., ESPN+ | No. 19 | at James Madison | W 78–65 | 8–2 | 24 – Prosper | 6 – Tied | 6 – de Jesus | Atlantic Union Bank Center (4,211); Harrisonburg, VA |
| December 21, 2025*; 5:00 p.m., ACCNX | No. 20 | Bellarmine | W 110–38 | 9–2 | 30 – Hidalgo | 14 – Prosper | 10 – Hidalgo | Purcell Pavilion (6,875); Notre Dame, IN |
| December 29, 2025; 6:00 p.m., ACCN | No. 18 | Pittsburgh | W 94–59 | 10–2 (2–0) | 30 – Hidalgo | 10 – Prosper | 6 – de Jesus | Purcell Pavilion (7,879); Notre Dame, IN |
| January 1, 2026; 4:00 p.m., ACCN | No. 18 | at Georgia Tech | L 90–95 ^{OT} | 10–3 (2–1) | 26 – Hidalgo | 10 – Prosper | 10 – Hidalgo | McCamish Pavilion (3,759); Atlanta, GA |
| January 4, 2026; 12:00 p.m., ACCN | No. 18 | at Duke | L 68–82 | 10–4 (2–2) | 22 – Hidalgo | 9 – Hidalgo | 7 – Hidalgo | Cameron Indoor Stadium (4,244); Durham, NC |
| January 8, 2026; 6:00 p.m., ACCNX | | Boston College | W 94–60 | 11–4 (3–2) | 27 – Prosper | 13 – Prosper | 5 – Hidalgo | Purcell Pavilion (6,223); Notre Dame, IN |
| January 11, 2026; 1:00 p.m., ESPN | | No. 22 North Carolina | W 73–50 | 12–4 (4–2) | 31 – Hidalgo | 14 – Prosper | 6 – Hidalgo | Purcell Pavilion (8,101); Notre Dame, IN |
| January 15, 2026; 6:00 p.m., ACCN | No. 23 | No. 9 Louisville | L 66–79 | 12–5 (4–3) | 24 – Hidalgo | 10 – Prosper | 8 – Hidalgo | Purcell Pavilion (6,499); Notre Dame, IN |
| January 19, 2026*; 5:00 p.m., FOX | | at No. 1 UConn; Rivalry | L 47–85 | 12–6 | 16 – Hidalgo | 7 – Prosper | 3 – Prosper | Harry A. Gampel Pavilion (10,244); Storrs, CT |
| January 22, 2026; 6:00 p.m., ACCN | | Miami (FL) | W 74–66 | 13–6 (5–3) | 27 – Hidalgo | 8 – Prosper | 5 – Hidalgo | Purcell Pavilion (6,669); Notre Dame, IN |
| January 25, 2026; 3:00 p.m., ACCNX | | Clemson | L 58–65 | 13–7 (5–4) | 30 – Hidalgo | 4 – Tied | 6 – Hidalgo | Purcell Pavilion (8,295); Notre Dame, IN |
| January 29, 2026; 10:00 p.m., ACCNX | | at California | L 69–80 | 13–8 (5–5) | 22 – Hidalgo | 9 – Prosper | 6 – Hidalgo | Haas Pavilion (2,357); Berkeley, CA |
| February 1, 2026; 4:00 p.m., The CW | | at Stanford | W 78–66 | 14–8 (6–5) | 37 – Hidalgo | 11 – Cowles | 3 – Tied | Maples Pavilion (4,119); Stanford, CA |
| February 5, 2026; 7:00 p.m., ACCNX | | Virginia Tech | W 80–70 | 15–8 (7–5) | 16 – Hidalgo | 7 – Hidalgo | 5 – Tied | Purcell Pavilion (6,775); Notre Dame, IN |
| February 8, 2026; 2:00 p.m., ACCNX | | at Virginia | L 70–81 | 15–9 (7–6) | 24 – Hidalgo | 7 – Tied | 8 – Hidalgo | John Paul Jones Arena (5,223); Charlottesville, VA |
| February 15, 2026; 4:00 p.m., ESPN | | NC State | W 79–67 | 16–9 (8–6) | 19 – Hidalgo | 8 – Hidalgo | 6 – Hidalgo | Purcell Pavilion (8,367); Notre Dame, IN |
| February 19, 2026; 6:00 p.m., ACCNX | | at Wake Forest | W 78–54 | 17–9 (9–6) | 26 – Hidalgo | 5 – Tied | 5 – Prosper | LJVM Coliseum (1,521); Winston-Salem, NC |
| February 22, 2026; 6:00 p.m., ACCN | | at SMU | W 88–63 | 18–9 (10–6) | 31 – Hidalgo | 9 – Hidalgo | 3 – Tied | Moody Coliseum (3,209); University Park, TX |
| February 26, 2026; 7:00 p.m., ACCNX | | Syracuse | W 72–62 | 19–9 (11–6) | 27 – Hidalgo | 8 – Hidalgo | 7 – Hidalgo | Purcell Pavilion (6,833); Notre Dame, IN |
| March 1, 2026; 4:00 p.m., ESPN2 | | at No. 10 Louisville | W 65–62 | 20–9 (12–6) | 30 – Hidalgo | 10 – Hidalgo | 7 – Hidalgo | KFC Yum! Center (11,605); Louisville, KY |
ACC tournament
| March 5, 2026*; 1:30 p.m., ACCN | (5) | vs. (12) Miami (FL); Second Round | W 69–54 | 21–9 | 28 – Hidalgo | 12 – Cowles | 5 – Hidalgo | Gas South Arena (6,203); Duluth, GA |
| March 6, 2026*; 1:30 p.m., ACCN | (5) | vs. (4) NC State; Quarterfinals | W 81–63 | 22–9 | 25 – Hidalgo | 9 – Moore | 5 – Hidalgo | Gas South Arena (8,233); Duluth, GA |
| March 7, 2026*; 12:00 p.m., ESPN2 | (5) | vs. (1) No. 13 Duke; Semifinals | L 63–65 | 22–10 | 24 – Hidalgo | 8 – Hidalgo | 2 – Tied | Gas South Arena (6,604); Duluth, GA |
NCAA tournament
| March 21, 2026*; 2:30 p.m., ESPN | (6 FW1) No. 22 | vs. (11 FW1) Fairfield; First Round | W 79–60 | 23–10 | 23 – Hidalgo | 9 – Tied | 6 – Hidalgo | Value City Arena (6,169); Columbus, OH |
| March 23, 2026*; 4:00 p.m., ESPN | (6 FW1) No. 22 | at (3 FW1) No. 12 Ohio State; Second Round | W 83–73 | 24–10 | 26 – Hidalgo | 13 – Hidalgo | 3 – Bransford | Value City Arena (5,671); Columbus, OH |
| March 27, 2026*; 2:30 p.m., ESPN | (6 FW1) No. 22 | vs. (2 FW1) No. 6 Vanderbilt; Sweet Sixteen | W 67–64 | 25–10 | 31 – Hidalgo | 11 – Hidalgo | 7 – Hidalgo | Dickies Arena (9,375); Fort Worth, TX |
| March 29, 2026*; 1:00 p.m., ABC | (6 FW1) No. 22 | vs. (1 FW1) No. 1 UConn; Elite Eight/Rivalry | L 52–70 | 25–11 | 22 – Hidalgo | 11 – Hidalgo | 3 – Hidalgo | Dickies Arena (11,335); Fort Worth, TX |
*Non-conference game. ^{#}Rankings from AP Poll. (#) Tournament seedings in parentheses. FW1=Fort Worth 1. All times are in Eastern.

== Rankings ==
Ranking movements Legend: ██ Increase in ranking ██ Decrease in ranking — = Not ranked RV = Received votes
| | Week | | | | | | | | | | | | | | | | | | | | |
| Poll | Pre | 1 | 2 | 3 | 4 | 5 | 6 | 7 | 8 | 9 | 10 | 11 | 12 | 13 | 14 | 15 | 16 | 17 | 18 | 19 | Final |
|---|---|---|---|---|---|---|---|---|---|---|---|---|---|---|---|---|---|---|---|---|---|
| AP | 15 | 18 | 24 | 19 | 18 | 19 | 20 | 18 | 18* | RV | 23 | RV | — | — | — | — | RV | RV | 22 | 22 | 9 |
| Coaches | 13 | 17 | 23 | 19 | 19 | 19 | 20 | 18 | 18 | 25 | 22 | RV | — | — | — | — | RV | RV | 25 | 25 | 14 |

*AP did not release a week 8 poll.
