= WBCA Freshman of the Year =

American women's basketball award

- Awarded for: the most outstanding freshmen female college basketball player
- Country: United States
- Presented by: Adidas

History
- First award: 2017
- Most recent: Jazzy Davidson, USC

The WBCA Freshman of the Year is an annual college basketball award presented by Adidas to the most outstanding freshman player. The award was first given following the 2016–17 season.

== Key ==
†	Co-National Freshman of the Year
*	Awarded a national Player of the Year award as a freshman: the Naismith College Player of the Year or the John R. Wooden Award (Note: Freshmen are ineligible for the other major national award, the Wade Trophy.)

== Winners ==
Season	Player	School	Source(s)
2016–17	Destiny Slocum	Maryland	
2017–18	Chennedy Carter	Texas A&M	
2018–19	Rhyne Howard	Kentucky	
2019–20	Aliyah Boston	South Carolina	
2020–21^{†}	Paige Bueckers*	UConn	
2020–21^{†}	Caitlin Clark	Iowa	
2021–22	Aneesah Morrow	DePaul	
2022–23	Ta'Niya Latson	Florida State	
2023–24	JuJu Watkins	USC	
2024–25	Sarah Strong	UConn	
2025–26	Jazzy Davidson	USC	
