= Inès Pitarch-Granel =

French basketball player (born 2006)

No. 26 – Tango Bourges Basket
- Position: Forward
- League: LFB

Personal information
- Born: 6 May 2006 (age 19)
- Listed height: 5 ft 11 in (1.80 m)

Career information
- WNBA draft: 2026: 2nd round, 27th overall pick
- Drafted by: Phoenix Mercury

Career history
- 2024–present: Tango Bourges Basket

Inès Pitarch-Granel (born 6 May 2006) is a French professional basketball player for Tango Bourges Basket of the Ligue Féminine de Basketball (LFB).

== Playing career ==
On 7 May 2024, Pitarch-Granel signed a three-year contract with Tango Bourges Basket of the Ligue Féminine de Basketball (LFB). During the 2025–26 season she averaged 5.3 points and 2.6 rebounds in 24 games.

On 13 April 2026, she was drafted in the second round, 27th overall, by the Phoenix Mercury in the 2026 WNBA draft.

== National team career ==
Pitarch-Granel represented France at the 2025 FIBA Under-19 Women's Basketball World Cup where she averaged 9.7 points, 4.7 rebounds and 1.2 assists per game, and finished in fifth place.
