= 2025 FIBA Under-19 Women's Basketball World Cup =

Mistrovství světa v basketbalu žen do 19 let 2025

Tournament details
- Host country: Czech Republic
- City: Brno
- Dates: 12–20 July
- Teams: 16 (from 5 confederations)

Final positions
- Champions: United States (11th title)
- Runners-up: Australia
- Third place: Spain
- Fourth place: Canada

Tournament statistics
- Games played: 49
- Attendance: 8,800 (180 per game)
- MVP: (United States) Saniyah Hall
- Top scorer: (Israel) Gal Raviv (26.3 ppg)

Official website
- FIBA

The 2025 FIBA Under-19 Basketball World Cup was the 16th edition of the FIBA Under-19 Women's Basketball World Cup, the biennial international women's basketball championship contested by the U19 national teams of the member associations of FIBA. The tournament was held in Brno, Czech Republic, from 12 to 20 July 2025.

The United States won their fourth consecutive and 11th overall title, after defeating Australia 88–76 in the final.

== Qualified teams ==
Means of qualification	Dates	Venue	Berth(s)	Qualifier(s)
Host nation	—N/a	—N/a	1	Czech Republic
2024 FIBA U18 Women's AmeriCup	17–23 June 2024	(Colombia) Bucaramanga	4	United States; Canada; Argentina; Brazil
2024 FIBA U18 Women's EuroBasket	3–11 August 2024	(Portugal) Matosinhos	5	France; Spain; Hungary; Israel; Portugal
2024 FIBA U18 Women's Asia Cup	24–30 June 2024	(China) Shenzhen	4	Australia; China; Japan; South Korea
2024 FIBA U18 Women's AfroBasket	2–14 September 2024	(South Africa) Pretoria	2	Mali; Nigeria
Total			16	

== Draw ==
The draw was held on 4 February 2025 at Nová radnice in Brno, Czech Republic.

=== Seeding ===
The seeding was announced on 1 February 2025. Teams were distributed into the four pots based on the FIBA Girls World Ranking and the results of the 2024 FIBA U18 women's continental competitions.

Teams from the same region could not be drawn into the same group, with the exception of Europe where each group had to contain a minimum of one and a maximum of two European teams.

Pot 1	Pot 2	Pot 3	Pot 4
Czech Republic; United States; France; Canada	Spain; Australia; China; Israel	Mali; Portugal; Japan; South Korea	Hungary; Argentina; Brazil; Nigeria

== Referees ==
The following 28 referees were selected for the tournament.

- (Argentina) Franco Anselmo
- (Australia) Ruben Woolcock
- (Brazil) Larissa Sales
- (Canada) Nathaniel Saunders
- (Canada) Xiang Fei
- (China) Gao Yijie
- (China) Zhang Xiao
- (France) Edgard Ceccarelli
- (France) Amal Dahra
- (Italy) Silvia Marziali
- (Japan) Kumiko Kumagai
- (Latvia) Elvis Binders-Čoders
- (Latvia) Ritvars Helmšteins
- (Lithuania) Gintaras Mačiulis
- (Montenegro) Nataša Dragojević
- (New Zealand) Martin Davison
- (Puerto Rico) Carmelo de la Rosa
- (Puerto Rico) Julirys Guzmán
- (Romania) Viola Györgyi
- (Rwanda) Jean Ruhamiriza
- (Serbia) Petar Pešić
- (South Africa) Arnold Moseya
- (Spain) Yasmina Alcaraz
- (Spain) Sandra Sánchez
- (Syria) Wissam Zein
- (Thailand) Suebpong Wichaiphin
- (Turkey) Çisil Güngör
- (Venezuela) Daniel García
- (Uruguay) Aline García

== Preliminary round ==
All times are local (UTC+2).

=== Group A ===
Pos	Team	Pld	W	L	PF	PA	PD	Pts
1	United States	3	3	0	327	142	+185	6
2	Hungary	3	2	1	216	206	+10	5
3	Israel	3	1	2	185	261	−76	4
4	South Korea	3	0	3	159	278	−119	3

Source: FIBA
Rules for classification: 1) Points; 2) Head-to-head results; 3) Points difference; 4) Points scored.

12 July 2025
19:45

Report

Israel	82–86	Hungary
Scoring by quarter: 14–15, 21–27, 27–18, 20–26
Pts: Raviv 35; Rebs: three players 5 Asts: Raviv 8		Pts: Rátkai 24; Rebs: Josepovits 12; Asts: Toman 8

Sportovní hala Vodova Hall 2, Brno
Attendance: 125
Referees: Nathaniel Saunders (CAN), Yasmina Alcaraz (ESP), Edgard Ceccarelli (FRA)

12 July 2025
20:15

Report

United States	134–53	South Korea
Scoring by quarter: 30–17, 34–8, 30–13, 40–15
Pts: Betts 35; Rebs: Robinson, Skinner 7 Asts: Greenway, Harpring 5		Pts: Song 15; Rebs: Jeong 5 Asts: Lim 6

Sportovní hala Vodova, Brno
Attendance: 168
Referees: Ruben Woolcock (AUS), Silvia Marziali (ITA), Zhang Xiao (CHN)

13 July 2025
19:45

Report

South Korea	61–63	Israel
Scoring by quarter: 22–16, 18–16, 10–16, 11–15
Pts: Jeong 18; Rebs: Choi 10; Asts: Jeong 4		Pts: Raviv 30; Rebs: Raviv 8 Asts: Oren 3

Sportovní hala Vodova Hall 2, Brno
Attendance: 77
Referees: Çisil Güngör (TUR), Aline García (URU), Xiang Fei (CAN)

13 July 2025
20:15

Report

Hungary	49–79	United States
Scoring by quarter: 15–26, 16–16, 12–17, 6–20
Pts: three players 7 Rebs: Arvai 7 Asts: Toman, Szucs 3		Pts: Harpring 15; Rebs: Betts 13; Asts: Heckel 7

Sportovní hala Vodova, Brno
Attendance: 113
Referees: Yasmina Alcaraz (ESP), Arnold Moseya (RSA), Ritvars Helmšteins (LAT)

15 July 2025
14:30

Report

United States	114–40	Israel
Scoring by quarter: 37–13, 23–8, 30–10, 24–9
Pts: Davidson 24; Rebs: Betts 12; Asts: Davidson 8		Pts: Raviv 9 Rebs: T. Cohen 3 Asts: Oren 4

Sportovní hala Vodova, Brno
Attendance: 169
Referees: Daniel García (VEN), Jean Ruhamiriza (RWA), Suebpong Wichaiphin (THA)

15 July 2025
14:30

Report

Hungary	81–45	South Korea
Scoring by quarter: 22–17, 20–8, 16–10, 23–10
Pts: Rátkai 14; Rebs: Josepovits 8 Asts: Rátkai 7		Pts: Song 12; Rebs: Jeong 4 Asts: Lee W. 5

Sportovní hala Vodova Hall 2, Brno
Attendance: 106
Referees: Wissam Zein (SYR), Edgard Ceccarelli (FRA), Franco Anselmo (ARG)

=== Group B ===
Pos	Team	Pld	W	L	PF	PA	PD	Pts
1	Canada	3	3	0	316	143	+173	6
2	Portugal	3	2	1	203	201	+2	5
3	Nigeria	3	1	2	196	280	−84	4
4	China	3	0	3	192	283	−91	3

Source: FIBA
Rules for classification: 1) Points; 2) Head-to-head results; 3) Points difference; 4) Points scored.

12 July 2025
14:00

Report

Nigeria	93–88	China
Scoring by quarter: 16–24, 22–20, 23–16, 32–28
Pts: Ezike 25; Rebs: Chukwu 10; Asts: Deggi 5		Pts: Ran 28; Rebs: Du, Ran 12; Asts: Xu F. 9

Sportovní hala Vodova Hall 2, Brno
Attendance: 102
Referees: Gintaras Mačiulis (LTU), Jean Ruhamiriza (RWA), Kumiko Kumagai (JPN)

12 July 2025
14:30

Report

Portugal	49–88	Canada
Scoring by quarter: 16–27, 11–16, 7–27, 15–18
Pts: M. Rodrigues 14; Rebs: Silva 7 Asts: Karim 5		Pts: Swords 18; Rebs: Makeer, Yiech 6 Asts: Bascoe 9

Sportovní hala Vodova, Brno
Attendance: 101
Referees: Julirys Guzmán (PUR), Çisil Güngör (TUR), Sandra Sánchez (ESP)

13 July 2025
11:15

Report

China	52–75	Portugal
Scoring by quarter: 14–19, 12–14, 10–26, 16–16
Pts: Ran 17; Rebs: Ran 10; Asts: Xu F. 4		Pts: Silva 25; Rebs: Silva 12; Asts: Silva 3

Sportovní hala Vodova Hall 2, Brno
Attendance: 163
Referees: Carmelo de la Rosa (PUR), Amal Dahra (FRA), Jean Ruhamiriza (RWA)

13 July 2025
14:30

Report

Canada	113–42	Nigeria
Scoring by quarter: 23–5, 39–11, 23–16, 28–10
Pts: Makeer 18; Rebs: three players 5 Asts: Holloway 5		Pts: Hembam 13; Rebs: Ezike 9 Asts: Hembam 3

Sportovní hala Vodova, Brno
Attendance: 97
Referees: Viola Györgyi (ROU), Wissam Zein (SYR), Larissa Sales (BRA)

15 July 2025
11:45

Report

Nigeria	61–79	Portugal
Scoring by quarter: 13–17, 14–19, 18–18, 16–25
Pts: Beggi 17; Rebs: Chukwu 12; Asts: Beggi 6		Pts: Silva 17; Rebs: Silva 14; Asts: Karim, Nazário 4

Sportovní hala Vodova Hall 2, Brno
Attendance: 117
Referees: Ruben Woolcock (AUS), Nataša Dragojević (MNE), Elvis Binders-Čoders (LAT)

15 July 2025
11:45

Report

Canada	115–52	China
Scoring by quarter: 32–8, 23–18, 28–13, 32–13
Pts: Howell 26; Rebs: Swords 9 Asts: Holloway 7		Pts: Ran 14; Rebs: Ran 7 Asts: three players 2

Sportovní hala Vodova, Brno
Attendance: 132
Referees: Gintaras Mačiulis (LTU), Arnold Moseya (RSA), Kumiko Kumagai (JPN)

=== Group C ===
Pos	Team	Pld	W	L	PF	PA	PD	Pts
1	Australia	2	2	0	157	125	+32	4
2	France	2	1	1	149	117	+32	3
3	Brazil	2	0	2	106	170	−64	2
4	~~Mali~~ (Note: Mali was unable to travel to the Czech Republic.)	0	0	0	0	0	0	0

Source: FIBA
Rules for classification: 1) Points; 2) Head-to-head results; 3) Points difference; 4) Points scored.
Notes:

12 July 2025
11:45

Report

France	83–47	Brazil
Scoring by quarter: 27–12, 23–16, 16–8, 17–11
Pts: Angloma 21; Rebs: Cissé 8 Asts: Colas, Kessler 4		Pts: McDowell 18; Rebs: McDowell 7 Asts: Cavalcanti, Araujo-Dagba 2

Sportovní hala Vodova, Brno
Attendance: 279
Referees: Viola Györgyi (ROU), Aline García (URU), Franco Anselmo (ARG)

13 July 2025
14:00

Report

Brazil	59–87	Australia
Scoring by quarter: 24–24, 10–25, 12–19, 13–19
Pts: Alves 20; Rebs: Preis 10; Asts: Lucas 3		Pts: Ryan 22; Rebs: Deas 9 Asts: Perkins 6

Sportovní hala Vodova Hall 2, Brno
Attendance: 64
Referees: Nathaniel Saunders (CAN), Zhang Xiao (CHN), Sandra Sánchez (ESP)

15 July 2025
20:15

Report

Australia	70–66	France
Scoring by quarter: 24–25, 14–10, 21–15, 11–16
Pts: Bobongie 17; Rebs: Puoch 12; Asts: Puoch 6		Pts: Angloma 19; Rebs: Cissé 16; Asts: Colas, Risacher 4

Sportovní hala Vodova, Brno
Attendance: 202
Referees: Petar Pešić (SRB), Yasmina Alcaraz (ESP), Xiang Fei (CAN)

=== Group D ===
Pos	Team	Pld	W	L	PF	PA	PD	Pts
1	Spain	3	3	0	194	145	+49	6
2	Japan	3	2	1	202	163	+39	5
3	Czech Republic (H)	3	1	2	171	171	0	4
4	Argentina	3	0	3	140	228	−88	3

Source: FIBA
Rules for classification: 1) Points; 2) Head-to-head results; 3) Points difference; 4) Points scored.
(H) Hosts

12 July 2025
17:00

Report

Spain	68–47	Argentina
Scoring by quarter: 15–15, 15–10, 21–8, 17–14
Pts: Okafor, Rodríguez 11; Rebs: Okafor 7 Asts: Álvarez 4		Pts: Lagowski 15; Rebs: Lagowski 12; Asts: Barrionuevo 3

Sportovní hala Vodova Hall 2, Brno
Attendance: 98
Referees: Carmelo de la Rosa (PUR), Amal Dahra (FRA), Ritvars Helmšteins (LAT)

12 July 2025
17:30

Report

Czech Republic	50–65	Japan
Scoring by quarter: 16–13, 5–7, 13–21, 16–24
Pts: Vyhlídková 13; Rebs: Pavelcová 6 Asts: four players 2		Pts: Goto 14; Rebs: Seito, Shiraishi 7 Asts: three players 4

Sportovní hala Vodova, Brno
Attendance: 623
Referees: Petar Pešić (SRB), Xiang Fei (CAN), Gao Yijie (CHN)

13 July 2025
17:00

Report

Japan	54–69	Spain
Scoring by quarter: 11–20, 17–19, 17–15, 9–15
Pts: Goto 19; Rebs: Goto 7 Asts: three players 2		Pts: Rodríguez 13; Rebs: Okafor, Sotelo 8 Asts: Toribio 5

Sportovní hala Vodova Hall 2, Brno
Attendance: 103
Referees: Julirys Guzmán (PUR), Edgard Ceccarelli (FRA), Suebpong Wichaiphin (THA)

13 July 2025
17:30

Report

Argentina	49–77	Czech Republic
Scoring by quarter: 18–22, 14–19, 7–11, 10–25
Pts: Barrionuevo, Maggi 12; Rebs: Barrionuevo, Bosque 5 Asts: Barrionuevo, Ingenito 2		Pts: Brzoňová 16; Rebs: Vyhlídková 6 Asts: Blahová 7

Sportovní hala Vodova, Brno
Attendance: 712
Referees: Ruben Woolcock (AUS), Elvis Binders-Čoders (LAT), Gao Yijie (CHN)

15 July 2025
17:30

Report

Spain	57–44	Czech Republic
Scoring by quarter: 16–11, 14–9, 14–14, 13–10
Pts: Okafor 11; Rebs: Nde 8 Asts: Alsina 5		Pts: Brzoňová 10; Rebs: Hamzová, Kameníková 5 Asts: Blahová 3

Sportovní hala Vodova, Brno
Attendance: 771
Referees: Julirys Guzmán (PUR), Aline García (URU), Zhang Xiao (CHN)

15 July 2025
17:30

Report

Japan	83–44	Argentina
Scoring by quarter: 11–12, 26–14, 18–8, 28–10
Pts: Goto 19; Rebs: Horiuchi 11; Asts: Horiuchi 7		Pts: Bosque 14; Rebs: Lagowski 7 Asts: Barrionuevo, Depetris 3

Sportovní hala Vodova Hall 2, Brno
Attendance: 65
Referees: Nathaniel Saunders (CAN), Silvia Marziali (ITA), Larissa Sales (BRA)

== Knockout stage ==
=== Bracket ===
==== Main bracket ====
Round of 16
16 July
A1 United States	122
B4 China	57
16 July
C2 France	65
D3 Czech Republic	31
16 July
A3 Israel	80
B2 Portugal	83
16 July
A2 Hungary	77
B3 Nigeria	51
16 July
C1 Australia	95
D4 Argentina	46
16 July
A4 South Korea	58
B1 Canada	70
16 July
C3 Brazil	52
D2 Japan	66

Quarter-finals
18 July
A1 United States	70
C2 France	65
18 July
B2 Portugal	58
D1 Spain	68
18 July
A2 Hungary	76
C1 Australia (OT)	82
18 July
B1 Canada	85
D2 Japan	65

Semi-finals
19 July
A1 United States	70
D1 Spain	58
19 July
C1 Australia	87
B1 Canada	75

Final
20 July
A1 United States	88
C1 Australia	76
Third place
20 July
D1 Spain	70
B1 Canada	68

==== 5–8th place bracket ====
5–8th place semifinals
19 July
C2 France	81
B2 Portugal	51
19 July
A2 Hungary	76
D2 Japan	78

Fifth place
20 July
C2 France	76
D2 Japan	64
Seventh place
20 July
B2 Portugal	74
A2 Hungary	58

==== 9–15th place bracket ====
9–15th place quarterfinals
18 July
B4 China (OT)	80
D3 Czech Republic	79
18 July
B3 Nigeria	68
D4 Argentina	58
18 July
A4 South Korea	87
C3 Brazil	80

9–12th place semifinals
19 July
B4 China	79
A3 Israel	84
19 July
B3 Nigeria	79
A4 South Korea	85

Ninth place
20 July
A3 Israel	80
A4 South Korea	86
Eleventh place
20 July
B4 China	96
B3 Nigeria	71

==== 13–15th place bracket ====
13–15th place semifinal
19 July
D4 Argentina	62
C3 Brazil	68

13th place
20 July
D3 Czech Republic	70
C3 Brazil	65

=== Round of 16 ===
16 July 2025
11:45

Report

South Korea	58–70	Canada
Scoring by quarter: 18–28, 10–10, 14–12, 16–20
Pts: Lim 20; Rebs: Choi, Jeong 7 Asts: Song 8		Pts: Swords 15; Rebs: Parchment 9 Asts: Parchment 5

Sportovní hala Vodova, Brno
Attendance: 93
Referees: Gintaras Mačiulis (LTU), Arnold Moseya (RSA), Franco Anselmo (ARG)

16 July 2025
14:00

Report

Israel	80–83	Portugal
Scoring by quarter: 29–25, 10–14, 23–27, 18–17
Pts: Oren 20; Rebs: Raviv 8 Asts: Oren 9		Pts: Silva 37; Rebs: Silva 10; Asts: Nazário 8

Sportovní hala Vodova Hall 2, Brno
Attendance: 132
Referees: Gintaras Mačiulis (LTU), Arnold Moseya (RSA), Franco Anselmo (ARG)

16 July 2025
14:30

Report

United States	122–57	China
Scoring by quarter: 28–18, 40–19, 26–11, 28–9
Pts: Betts 21; Rebs: Betts 10; Asts: Greenway 9		Pts: Ran 13; Rebs: Ran 8 Asts: Ran, Xu F. 3

Sportovní hala Vodova, Brno
Attendance: 102
Referees: Wissam Zein (SYR), Çisil Güngör (TUR), Nataša Dragojević (MNE)

16 July 2025
17:00

Report

Hungary	77–51	Nigeria
Scoring by quarter: 9–9, 30–12, 16–15, 22–15
Pts: Josepovits 19; Rebs: Fárbás 13; Asts: Rátkai 10		Pts: Nweke 12; Rebs: Chukwu 9 Asts: Beggi, Hembam 4

Sportovní hala Vodova Hall 2, Brno
Attendance: 68
Referees: Carmelo de la Rosa (PUR), Amal Dahra (FRA), Jean Ruhamiriza (RWA)

16 July 2025
17:30

Report

France	65–31	Czech Republic
Scoring by quarter: 23–11, 22–6, 9–7, 11–7
Pts: Angloma, Risacher 13; Rebs: Pitarch-Granel 7 Asts: six players 2		Pts: Kameníková, Rychtecká 7 Rebs: Pavelcová 6 Asts: Blahová 4

Sportovní hala Vodova, Brno
Attendance: 349
Referees: Viola Györgyi (ROU), Ruben Woolcock (AUS), Elvis Binders-Čoders (LAT)

16 July 2025
19:45

Report

Brazil	52–66	Japan
Scoring by quarter: 13–13, 12–20, 7–10, 20–23
Pts: Alves 18; Rebs: Ubaka 11; Asts: Cavalcanti 7		Pts: Goto 27; Rebs: Goto 11; Asts: Horiuchi 7

Sportovní hala Vodova Hall 2, Brno
Attendance: 72
Referees: Daniel García (VEN), Gao Yijie (CHN), Sandra Sánchez (ESP)

16 July 2025
20:15

Report

Australia	95–46	Argentina
Scoring by quarter: 22–6, 21–14, 17–15, 25–11
Pts: Fagan, Ryan 14; Rebs: Notoa 13; Asts: Harvey, Notoa 6		Pts: Ingenito 11; Rebs: Bosque, Lagowski 4 Asts: Barrionuevo, Depetris 3

Sportovní hala Vodova, Brno
Attendance: 94
Referees: Nathaniel Saunders (CAN), Ritvars Helmšteins (LAT), Kumiko Kumagai (JPN)

=== 9–15th place quarterfinals ===
18 July 2025
13:30

Report

South Korea	87–80	Brazil
Scoring by quarter: 18–23, 20–19, 23–14, 26–24
Pts: Lee M. 28; Rebs: Choi 6 Asts: Jyeong 8		Pts: Alves 24; Rebs: Alves 10; Asts: Alves 7

Sportovní hala Vodova Hall 2, Brno
Attendance: 41
Referees: Yasmina Alcaraz (ESP), Nataša Dragojević (MNE), Xiang Fei (CAN)

18 July 2025
16:00

Report

Nigeria	68–58	Argentina
Scoring by quarter: 19–17, 10–9, 18–11, 21–21
Pts: Ezike, Hembam 17; Rebs: three players 8 Asts: Beggi 6		Pts: Bosque 14; Rebs: Lagowski 10; Asts: Depetris 8

Sportovní hala Vodova Hall 2, Brno
Attendance: 97
Referees: Wissam Zein (SYR), Sandra Sánchez (ESP), Zhang Xiao (CHN)

18 July 2025
18:30

Report

China	80–79 (OT)	Czech Republic
Scoring by quarter: 15–15, 13–22, 23–17, 15–12, Overtime: 14–13
Pts: Ran 25; Rebs: Ran 16; Asts: Ran 4		Pts: Kalbá 17; Rebs: Pavelcová 12; Asts: Blahová 7

Sportovní hala Vodova Hall 2, Brno
Attendance: 287
Referees: Ritvars Helmšteins (LAT), Larissa Sales (BRA), Aline García (URU)

=== Quarterfinals ===
18 July 2025
11:45

Report

Hungary	76–82 (OT)	Australia
Scoring by quarter: 21–22, 20–17, 21–19, 7–11, Overtime: 7–13
Pts: Toman, Toman 18; Rebs: Rátkai 7 Asts: Rátkai 6		Pts: Deas 17; Rebs: Ryan, Puoch 9 Asts: three players 4

Sportovní hala Vodova, Brno
Attendance: 112
Referees: Julirys Guzmán (PUR), Çisil Güngör (TUR), Edgard Ceccarelli (FRA)

18 July 2025
14:30

Report

Canada	85–65	Japan
Scoring by quarter: 26–11, 17–15, 26–16, 16–23
Pts: Swords 17; Rebs: Parchment 11; Asts: Makeer, Parchment 4		Pts: Goto 16; Rebs: Horiuchi 9 Asts: three players 4

Sportovní hala Vodova, Brno
Attendance: 110
Referees: Viola Györgyi (ROU), Aline García (URU), Elvis (LAT)

18 July 2025
17:30

Report

Portugal	58–68	Spain
Scoring by quarter: 14–22, 18–19, 11–6, 15–21
Pts: Silva 23; Rebs: Andorinho 8 Asts: Nazário, Silva 4		Pts: Okafor 13; Rebs: Sotelo 10; Asts: Toribio 6

Sportovní hala Vodova, Brno
Attendance: 186
Referees: Ruben Woolcock (AUS), Petar Pešić (SRB), Silvia Marziali (ITA)

18 July 2025
20:15

Report

United States	70–65	France
Scoring by quarter: 19–10, 19–22, 14–13, 18–20
Pts: Hall 26; Rebs: Betts 11; Asts: Heckel 4		Pts: Angloma 20; Rebs: Cissé, Colas 7 Asts: Risacher 4

Sportovní hala Vodova, Brno
Attendance: 279
Referees: Nathaniel Saunders (CAN), Gintaras Mačiulis (LTU), Gao Yijie (CHN)

=== 13–15th place semifinal ===
19 July 2025
18:30

Report

Argentina	62–68	Brazil
Scoring by quarter: 21–12, 13–16, 14–15, 14–25
Pts: Depetris 18; Rebs: Lagowski 10; Asts: Barrionuevo 3		Pts: McDowell 18; Rebs: Alves 13; Asts: Alves 4

Sportovní hala Vodova Hall 2, Brno
Attendance: 82
Referees: Gintaras Mačiulis (LTU), Aline García (URU), Edgard Ceccarelli (FRA)

=== 9–12th place semifinals ===
19 July 2025
13:30

Report

China	79–84	Israel
Scoring by quarter: 14–18, 27–28, 15–14, 23–24
Pts: Liang 25; Rebs: Liang, Ran 13; Asts: Ran 7		Pts: Raviv 38; Rebs: Raviv 9 Asts: Oren, Raviv 6

Sportovní hala Vodova Hall 2, Brno
Attendance: 92
Referees: Nathaniel Saunders (CAN), Franco Anselmo (ARG), Suebpong Wichaiphin (THA)

19 July 2025
16:00

Report

Nigeria	79–85	South Korea
Scoring by quarter: 20–25, 19–16, 18–27, 22–17
Pts: Hembam 19; Rebs: three players 6 Asts: Beggi 8		Pts: Lee M., Song 17; Rebs: Choi 9 Asts: Choi 6

Sportovní hala Vodova Hall 2, Brno
Attendance: 61
Referees: Daniel García (VEN), Arnold Moseya (RSA), Kumiko Kumagai (JPN)

=== 5–8th place semifinals ===
19 July 2025
11:30

Report

Hungary	76–78	Japan
Scoring by quarter: 17–21, 15–21, 23–17, 21–19
Pts: Toman 20; Rebs: Toman 8 Asts: three players 4		Pts: Matsumoto 21; Rebs: Goto 8 Asts: Ito 7

Sportovní hala Vodova, Brno
Attendance: 117
Referees: Carmelo de la Rosa (PUR), Xiang Fei (CAN), Elvis Binders-Čoders (LAT)

19 July 2025
14:00

Report

France	81–51	Portugal
Scoring by quarter: 21–14, 21–13, 26–14, 13–10
Pts: Cissé 18; Rebs: Cissé 10; Asts: Kessler 9		Pts: Silva 20; Rebs: Silva 7 Asts: Sousa 4

Sportovní hala Vodova, Brno
Attendance: 121
Referees: Julirys Guzmán (PUR), Yasmina Alcaraz (ESP), Jean Ruhamiriza (RWA)

=== Semifinals ===
19 July 2025
17:00

Report

Australia	87–75	Canada
Scoring by quarter: 22–20, 21–16, 23–20, 21–19
Pts: three players 14; Rebs: Deas 8 Asts: Perkins 5		Pts: Bascoe 29; Rebs: Makeer 7 Asts: Bascoe 9

Sportovní hala Vodova, Brno
Attendance: 251
Referees: Petar Pešić (SRB), Silvia Marziali (ITA), Gao Yijie (CHN)

19 July 2025
20:00

Report

United States	70–58	Spain
Scoring by quarter: 20–19, 18–9, 26–14, 6–16
Pts: Hall 16; Rebs: Betts 7 Asts: three players 3		Pts: Rodríguez 14; Rebs: Nde 7 Asts: Toribio 3

Sportovní hala Vodova, Brno
Attendance: 302
Referees: Viola Györgyi (ROU), Çisil Güngör (TUR), Amal Dahra (FRA)

=== 13th place game ===
20 July 2025
15:00

Report

Czech Republic	70–65	Brazil
Scoring by quarter: 20–17, 21–16, 12–20, 17–12
Pts: Hamzová 16; Rebs: Hamzová 6 Asts: three players 3		Pts: McDowell 20; Rebs: Ubaka 8 Asts: Cavalcanti 4

Sportovní hala Vodova Hall 2, Brno
Attendance: 316
Referees: Carmelo de la Rosa (PUR), Elvis Binders-Čoders (LAT), Zhang Xiao (CHN)

=== Eleventh place game ===
20 July 2025
10:00

Report

China	96–71	Nigeria
Scoring by quarter: 26–14, 30–21, 23–18, 17–18
Pts: Ran 25; Rebs: Ran 13; Asts: Xu F. 8		Pts: Beggi 18; Rebs: Ezike, Isaac 9 Asts: Beggi 6

Sportovní hala Vodova Hall 2, Brno
Attendance: 67
Referees: Wissam Zein (SYR), Edgard Ceccarelli (FRA), Larissa Sales (BRA)

=== Ninth place game ===
20 July 2025
12:30

Report

Israel	80–86	South Korea
Scoring by quarter: 20–21, 22–25, 22–29, 16–11
Pts: Raviv 28; Rebs: Oren 9 Asts: Oren 6		Pts: Choi 24; Rebs: Choi 10; Asts: Lee G. 6

Sportovní hala Vodova Hall 2, Brno
Attendance: 91
Referees: Amal Dahra (FRA), Arnold Moseya (RSA), Gao Yijie (CHN)

=== Seventh place game ===
20 July 2025
11:30

Report

Portugal	74–58	Hungary
Scoring by quarter: 21–15, 26–18, 19–11, 8–14
Pts: Silva 27; Rebs: Silva 11; Asts: Nazário 10		Pts: Arvai 12; Rebs: Arvai 7 Asts: Szikszai 4

Sportovní hala Vodova, Brno
Attendance: 124
Referees: Nathaniel Saunders (CAN), Gintaras Mačiulis (LTU), Nataša Dragojević (MNE)

=== Fifth place game ===
20 July 2025
14:00

Report

France	76–64	Japan
Scoring by quarter: 25–17, 15–16, 20–17, 16–14
Pts: Pitarch-Granel 16; Rebs: Angloma 8 Asts: Kessler, Tagayi 3		Pts: Goto 21; Rebs: Fukatsu 9 Asts: Horiuchi 3

Sportovní hala Vodova, Brno
Attendance: 88
Referees: Yasmina Alcaraz (ESP), Silvia Marziali (ITA), Sandra Sánchez (ESP)

=== Third place game ===
20 July 2025
17:00

Report

Spain	70–68	Canada
Scoring by quarter: 10–15, 23–17, 21–20, 16–16
Pts: Okafor 23; Rebs: Okafor 11; Asts: three players 4		Pts: Swords 20; Rebs: Swords 8 Asts: Holloway 4

Sportovní hala Vodova, Brno
Attendance: 333
Referees: Julirys Guzmán (PUR), Ruben Woolcock (AUS), Ritvars Helmšteins (LAT)

=== Final ===
20 July 2025
20:00

Report

United States	88–76	Australia
Scoring by quarter: 26–23, 24–17, 14–17, 24–19
Pts: Hall 25; Rebs: Betts 11; Asts: Hall 7		Pts: Deas 13; Rebs: Bobongie 7 Asts: Harvey 5

Sportovní hala Vodova, Brno
Attendance: 662
Referees: Viola Györgyi (ROU), Petar Pešić (SRB), Çisil Güngör (TUR)

== Final standings ==
Rank	Team	Record
1st place, gold medalist(s)	United States	7–0
2nd place, silver medalist(s)	Australia	5–1
3rd place, bronze medalist(s)	Spain	5–1
4th	Canada	5–2
5th	France	4–2
6th	Japan	4–3
7th	Portugal	4–3
8th	Hungary	3–4
9th	South Korea	3–4
10th	Israel	2–4
11th	China	2–5
12th	Nigeria	2–5
13th	Czech Republic	2–4
14th	Brazil	1–5
15th	Argentina	0–6
16th	Mali	DQ

== Statistics and awards ==
=== Statistical leaders ===
==== Players ====
Points

Name	PPG
(Israel) Gal Raviv	26.3
(Portugal) Clara Silva	23.0
(United States) Saniyah Hall	19.9
(China) Ran Kejia	19.1
(Japan) Otoha Goto	18.9

Rebounds

Name	RPG
(China) Ran Kejia	11.3
(United States) Sienna Betts	10.0
(Portugal) Clara Silva	9.7
(France) Sarah Cisse	8.8
(Argentina) Nerea Lagowski	8.0

Assists

Name	APG
(Hungary) Eszter Rátkai	6.0
(Canada) Jasmine Bascoe	5.7
(Nigeria) Idubamo Beggi	5.6
(Israel) Ayala Oren	5.5
(Canada) Mila Holloway	4.7
(Israel) Gal Raviv	4.7

Blocks

Name	BPG
(Portugal) Clara Silva	2.9
(Brazil) Julia Preis	2.8
(United States) Sienna Betts	2.1
(Brazil) Manu Alves	1.7
(United States) Jazzy Davidson	1.4

Steals

Name	SPG
(Nigeria) Idubamo Beggi	3.0
(Israel) Ayala Oren	3.0
(United States) Jazzy Davidson	3.0
(United States) Saniyah Hall	2.9
(Brazil) Ayla McDowell	2.7

Efficiency

Name	EFFPG
(Portugal) Clara Silva	25.0
(United States) Saniyah Hall	24.0
(Israel) Gal Raviv	23.7
(China) Ran Kejia	22.1
(United States) Sienna Betts	21.0

==== Teams ====
Points

Team	PPG
United States	96.7
Canada	87.7
Australia	82.8
France	72.7
China	72.0

Rebounds

Team	RPG
United States	53.3
Australia	49.5
Canada	46.6
Japan	46.3
Nigeria	46.0

Assists

Team	APG
Canada	24.0
United States	23.6
Australia	22.5
South Korea	21.0
Hungary	20.0

Blocks

Team	BPG
United States	7.0
Brazil	5.0
France	5.0
Portugal
Hungary	4.6

Steals

Team	SPG
United States	16.0
Spain	13.8
France	12.5
Canada	10.7
Czech Republic	10.3

Efficiency

Team	EFFPG
United States	131.9
Canada	106.9
Australia	98.0
France	86.0
Hungary	83.0

=== Awards ===
The awards were announced on 20 July 2025.

All-Tournament Team
Guards	Forwards	Center
(Australia) Bonnie Deas (United States) Saniyah Hall (Spain) Somtochukwu Okafor (Canada) Syla Swords	(United States) Sienna Betts	
Most Valuable Player: (United States) Saniyah Hall
All-Second Team
Guards	Forwards	Center
(Israel) Gal Raviv (United States) Jazzy Davidson (France) Nell Angloma	(Canada) Avery Howell	(Portugal) Clara Silva
Best defensive player: (Portugal) Clara Silva
Best coach: (Australia) Renae Camino
