= Emilee Skinner =

American basketball player (born 2007)

No. 5 – Duke Blue Devils
- Position: Point guard / shooting guard
- League: Atlantic Coast Conference

Personal information
- Born: March 12, 2007 (age 19) Providence, Utah, U. S.
- Listed height: 6 ft 0 in (1.83 m)

Career information
- High school: Ridgeline (Millville, Utah)
- College: Duke (2025–present)

Career highlights
- McDonald's All-American Game (2025); Nike Hoop Summit (2025); Jordan Brand Classic (2025)
Medals
Women's basketball
Representing United States
FIBA Under-19 World Cup
Gold medal – first place	2025 Czech Republic	Team
FIBA Under-17 World Cup
Gold medal – first place	2024 Mexico	Team

Emilee Skinner (born March 12, 2007) is an American college basketball player for the Duke Blue Devils of the Atlantic Coast Conference.

== High school career ==
Skinner attended Ridgeline High School in Millville, Utah. She earned Class 4A All-State honors for all four years of her high school career, winning three straight Class 4A championships. As a senior, Skinner averaged 26.3 points, 10.2 rebounds, 5.0 assists, 3.7 steals and 1.5 blocks. She reached 2,313 career points, which is the fourth-highest total in Utah history. Skinner was named a McDonald's All-American in 2025. As the nation's No. 4 recruit in the class of 2025, she committed to play college basketball at Duke.

== College career ==
=== Freshman season ===
Skinner made her debut for Duke against Norfolk State, playing 13 minutes off the bench and had four points, three rebounds, five assists, one block and steal. In the following game versus West Virginia, she played in 21 minutes, scoring two points, four rebounds and one steal. Skinner missed the next five games with a lower-body injury, before returning against Virginia Tech, where she had seven points, seven rebounds and one steal. On February 9, 2026, head coach Kara Lawson announced that she would miss the rest of the season.

== National team career ==
On May 26, 2024, Skinner was named to the United States under-17 national team for the 2024 FIBA Under-17 Women's Basketball World Cup. She averaged 6.2 points, 3.3 rebounds and 1.5 assists in six games, as Team USA won the gold medal.

Skinner was added to the United States under-19 national team on June 20, 2025, for the 2025 FIBA Under-19 Women's Basketball World Cup. In seven games, she averaged 5.0 points, 3.9 rebounds, 1.4 assists and 1.7 steals, as she and team USA earned the gold medal.

== Career statistics ==
Legend
GP	Games played	GS	Games started	MPG	Minutes per game	RPG	Rebounds per game
APG	Assists per game	SPG	Steals per game	BPG	Blocks per game	PPG	Points per game
TO	Turnovers per game	FG%	Field-goal percentage	3P%	3-point field-goal percentage	FT%	Free-throw percentage
**Bold**	Career best	°	League leader

=== College ===
Year	Team	GP	GS	MPG	FG%	3P%	FT%	RPG	APG	SPG	BPG	TO	PPG
2025–26	Duke	3	0	16.0	25.0	0.0	50.0	4.7	1.7	1.0	0.3	4.3	4.3
Career		3	0	16.0	25.0	0.0	50.0	4.7	1.7	1.0	0.3	4.3	4.3
