= Saniyah Hall =

American basketball player (born 2008)

No. 2 – USC Trojans
- Position: Guard

Personal information
- Born: July 30, 2008 (age 18)
- Listed height: 6 ft 1 in (1.85 m)

Career information
- High school: Laurel (Shaker Heights, Ohio); Montverde Academy (Montverde, Florida); SPIRE Academy (Geneva, Ohio)
- College: USC (commit)

Career highlights
- McDonald's All-American Game MVP (2026); Nike Hoop Summit (2026); FIBA Under-19 World Cup MVP (2025)
Medals
Women's basketball
Representing the United States
FIBA Under-19 World Cup
Gold medal – first place	2025 Czech Republic	Team
Women's 3x3 basketball
Representing the United States
FIBA 3x3 U18 World Cup
Gold medal – first place	2024 Hungary	Team

Saniyah Lauren Lachelle Hall (born July 30, 2008) is an American college basketball player for the USC Trojans of the Big Ten Conference. She was ranked the No. 1 overall recruit in the 2026 class.

== High school career ==
Hall began her career at Laurel School in Shaker Heights, Ohio. During her freshman year, she averaged 20.8 points, 9.1 rebounds, 4.2 steals, 2.6 assists per game. She was named the Northeast Lakes District Player of the Year and a finalist for Ohio Ms. Basketball.

During her sophomore year, she averaged 25.5 points, 11.1 rebounds, 3.4 steals and 3.0 assists in 29 games. During the regional finals against Streetsboro High School, she recorded 31 points, eight rebounds, six assists and five blocked shots to advance to the Division II state semifinals. During the semifinals against Fairland High School, she scored a game-high 26 points and 15 rebounds to hep Laurel advance to the state championship game. Laurel lost to Purcell Marian High School in the championship game 59–72. Following the season she was named a finalist for Ohio Ms. Basketball for the second consecutive year.

On August 29, 2024, she transferred to Montverde Academy in Montverde, Florida. During her junior year, she averaged 20.3 points, 6.7 rebounds, 3.6 assists, 2.8 steals, and 1.4 block per game. Following the season she was named MaxPreps' National Junior of the Year and a first-team All-American.

On June 22, 2025, she transferred to SPIRE Academy in Geneva, Ohio. On July 8, 2025, she signed a NIL deal with Nike's Jordan Brand. On July 25, 2025, she committed to play college basketball at USC during ESPN's NBA Today.

On February 2, 2026, she was selected to play in the 2026 McDonald's All-American Girls Game. During the game she scored a game-high 21 points, along with five rebounds, and was named MVP. She then competed at the 2026 Nike Hoop Summit where she recorded a game-high tying 19 points, along with Jerzy Robinson.

== College career ==
Hall made her collegiate debut for USC on November 2, 2026, against UNLV and recorded 22 points, seven rebounds, two blocks and two steals. On November 8, 2026, against Utah State she recorded 20 points, five rebounds, three assists and two blocks. She was subsequently named Big Ten Freshman of the Week.

== National team career ==
On August 20, 2024, she was named to United States under-18 3x3 team for the 2024 FIBA 3x3 U18 World Cup. During the championship game against Japan, she scored eight points and helped team USA win a gold medal.

On June 20, 2025, she was named to the United States under-19 national team for the 2025 FIBA Under-19 Women's Basketball World Cup. During the tournament she averaged 19.9 points, 6.4 rebounds, 2.0 assists, 2.9 steals, and 1.1 blocks per game. During the final against Australia, she scored 25 points, nine rebounds and seven assists and helped team USA win a gold medal. She was subsequently named to the all-tournament team and named Most Valuable Player.
