= FIBA Under-19 Women's Basketball World Cup Most Valuable Player =

Youth basketball award

The FIBA Under-19 Women's Basketball World Cup Most Valuable Player is a bi-annual award, that is given by FIBA, to the Most Valuable Player of the FIBA Under-19 Women's Basketball World Cup.

== Winners ==
	Denotes player whose team won that years tournament
	Denotes player inducted into the FIBA Hall of Fame
	Denotes player who is still active
Player (X)	Denotes the number of times the player had been named MVP at that time
Team (X)	Denotes the number of times a player from this team had won at that time

Year	Player	Position	Team	Ref.
2005	Crystal Langhorne	Forward	United States	
2007	Frida Eldebrink	Guard	Sweden	
2009	Marta Xargay	Guard	Spain	
2011	Damiris Dantas	Forward	Brazil	
2013	Breanna Stewart	Forward	United States (2)	
2015	A'ja Wilson	Forward	United States (3)	
2017	Maria Vadeeva	Center	Russia	
2019	Paige Bueckers	Guard	United States (4)	
2021	Caitlin Clark	Guard	United States (5)	
2023	Iyana Martín Carrión	Point guard	Spain (2)	
2025	Saniyah Hall	Guard	United States (6)	
