= Grace Knox =

American basketball player

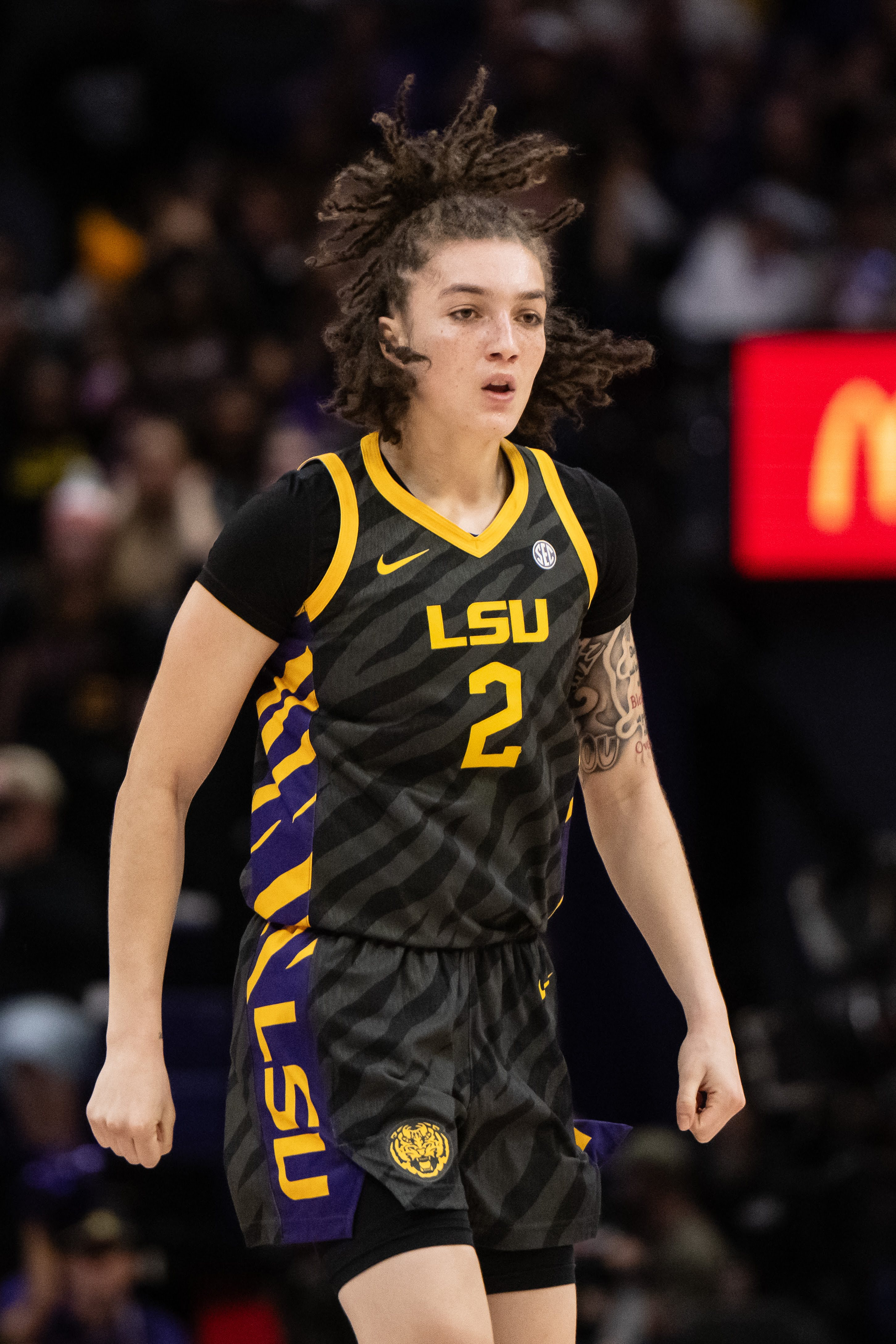
- Knox with LSU in 2026

No. 2 – LSU Tigers
- Position: Forward
- League: Southeastern Conference

Personal information
- Listed height: 6 ft 2 in (1.88 m)

Career information
- High school: Etiwanda (Rancho Cucamonga, California)
- College: LSU (2025–present)

Career highlights
- McDonald's All-American (2025)

Grace Knox is an American college basketball player for the LSU Tigers of the Southeastern Conference (SEC).

== Early life ==
A native of Las Vegas, Knox grew up with dreams of playing in the NFL. After switching to basketball, she started training with the help of her dad. Knox initially attended Spring Valley High School in her native Las Vegas. As a freshman, she led her team in both points (13.9) and rebounds (9.8) per game, helping the Spring Valley Grizzlies advance to the Nevada Interscholastic Activities Association (NIAA) Class 5A semifinals. Knox transferred to Centennial High School in Las Vegas for her sophomore year, but was unable to play due to a back fracture. Ahead of her junior year, she transferred again to Etiwanda High School in Rancho Cucamonga, California. That season, Knox averaged 17.2 points and 11.9 rebounds per game, helping the Etiwanda Eagles win the California Interscholastic Federation (CIF) Open Division state championship after scoring eight points and grabbing a game-high 11 rebounds in a 60–48 win over Archbishop Mitty High School in the final. The team finished the season with a 32–3 record and claimed the mythical national championship.

On January 20, 2025, as a senior, Knox helped Etiwanda defeat Incarnate Word Academy of Missouri on the final day of the Hoophall Classic, snapping their national-record 141-game win streak dating back nearly five years. She recorded 13 points, 12 rebounds, and four blocks in the 74–65 win. Knox finished the season averaging 16.5 points, 13.0 rebounds, and 2.6 blocks per game. She helped the Eagles to a 28–5 record and another CIF Open Division state championship, posting 10 points and 10 rebounds in a 75–59 win over Archbishop Mitty in the title game. Knox was selected to play in both the McDonald's All-American Game and the Nike Hoop Summit. She also played for the Cal Sparks on the Nike EYBL circuit.

=== Recruiting ===
Knox was considered a five-star recruit and the No. 6 player in the class of 2025 by ESPN. She received over 40 offers from NCAA Division I programs. Ahead of her senior year at Etiwanda, Knox narrowed her choices down to LSU, Tennessee, Texas, and USC. On November 6, 2024, she committed to playing college basketball for the LSU Tigers.

== College career ==
Knox made her collegiate debut on November 4, 2025, scoring 10 points in a 108–55 win over Houston Christian. She recorded her first career double-double on December 7, recording 12 points and 12 rebounds in a 126–62 win over New Orleans. On December 21, Knox tallied 25 points, 12 rebounds, three blocks, and three steals in a 110–45 win over UT Arlington, earning Southeastern Conference (SEC) Freshman of the Week honors. On January 22, 2026, she logged 19 points on perfect nine-of-nine shooting in a 98–54 win over Texas A&M.

== Personal life ==
Knox has a tattoo on her left arm that says: "Strength and knowledge are the blessings we gain from the obstacles we overcome."
