= 2025–26 Duke Blue Devils women's basketball team =

Intercollegiate basketball season

2025–26 Duke Blue Devils women's basketball

ACC regular season & tournament champions

NCAA tournament Elite Eight
- Conference: Atlantic Coast Conference

Ranking
- Coaches: No. 5
- AP: No. 5
- Record: 27–9 (16–2 ACC)
- Head coach: Kara Lawson (6th season)
- Associate head coach: Tia Jackson (6th season)
- Assistant coaches: Kyra Elzy (2nd season); Karen Lange (4th season); Karen Middleton (3rd season); Pierre Miller (3rd season)
- Home arena: Cameron Indoor Stadium

2025–26 ACC women's basketball standings
	Conf.				Overall
Team	W		L	PCT	W		L	PCT
No. 5 Duke †	16	–	2	.889	27	–	9	.750
No. 11 Louisville	15	–	3	.833	29	–	8	.784
No. 13 North Carolina	14	–	4	.778	28	–	8	.778
NC State	13	–	5	.722	21	–	11	.656
No. 9 Notre Dame	12	–	6	.667	25	–	10	.714
Virginia Tech	12	–	6	.667	23	–	10	.697
Syracuse	12	–	6	.667	24	–	9	.727
No. 19 Virginia	11	–	7	.611	22	–	12	.647
Clemson	11	–	7	.611	21	–	12	.636
California	9	–	9	.500	21	–	15	.583
Georgia Tech	8	–	10	.444	14	–	19	.424
Miami (FL)	8	–	10	.444	18	–	15	.545
Stanford	8	–	10	.444	21	–	14	.600
Florida State	5	–	13	.278	10	–	21	.323
Wake Forest	4	–	14	.222	14	–	18	.438
SMU	2	–	16	.111	9	–	21	.300
Pittsburgh	1	–	17	.056	8	–	23	.258
Boston College	1	–	17	.056	5	–	26	.161
† 2026 ACC tournament winner Rankings from AP Poll

The 2025–26 Duke Blue Devils women's basketball team represents Duke University during the 2025–26 NCAA Division I women's basketball season. The Blue Devils, led by sixth-year head coach Kara Lawson, played their home games at Cameron Indoor Stadium in Durham, North Carolina as members of the Atlantic Coast Conference.

The Blue Devils began the season ranked seventh in the AP poll and traveled to Paris, France for their opening game in the Oui-Play against sixteenth-ranked Baylor Bears. Duke was defeated 52–58 and fell to fifteenth in the rankings. After two non-conference victories, they lost 49–57 to West Virginia at the Greenbrier Tip-Off. A win against Liberty could not keep the Blue Devils in the rankings as they fell out. The team then went on a four-game losing streak which included a thirteen-point loss at South Florida before the team traveled to Las Vegas to participate in the Players Era Women's Championship. There they lost to second-ranked South Carolina and third-ranked UCLA. They also lost their ACC–SEC Challenge game against fifth-ranked LSU. The Blue Devils rebounded with a victory to open ACC play against Virginia Tech and won their final two games of the non-conference season. Those wins sparked a seventeen-game winning streak for the Blue Devils. Over the stretch they defeated eighteenth-ranked Notre Dame by fourteen points, and returned to the rankings at the end of January at number twenty-one. They were ranked twentieth when they defeated rivals Wake Forest by thirty-six points. They advanced to seventeenth and upset sixth-ranked Louisville by one point. They were eleventh when they defeated rivals and twenty-first-ranked North Carolina and NC State. Their winning streak was broken when they were upset by two-points at Clemson. The team fell to twelfth in the rankings and defeated Florida State but lost their rivalry re-match against twenty-first-ranked North Carolina by five-points. They ended the regular season ranked thirteenth.

The Blue Devils finished the regular season 21–8 overall and 16–2 in ACC play to finish as regular season conference champions. As the first seed in the ACC tournament, earned a bye into the quarterfinals, where they avenged a regular season loss to ninth-seed Clemson, 60–46. They defeated fifth-seed Notre Dame 65–63 in the semifinals. They won the final 70–65 over second-seed, twelfth-ranked, Louisville to defend their tournament title from the prior year. The Blue Devils had two players named to the All-Tournament First Team and three to the All-Tournament Second Team. As tournament champions, they received an automatic bid to the NCAA tournament and were the three-seed in the Sacramento 2 region. They defeated fourteen-seed Charleston and avenged their loss in the season opener against six-seed and twenty-first ranked Baylor at home to advance to the Sweet Sixteen. There they faced two-seed and fifth-ranked LSU in a re-match of their ACC–SEC Challenge game. This time Duke prevailed 87–85 to advance to the Elite Eight. There they faced first-seed and second-ranked UCLA in another regular-season rematch. Duke lost to UCLA for the second time this season, this time by twelve points, to end their season. The Blue Devils finished the season with a 27–9 record, and ranked fifth in both the AP and Coaches polls.

== Previous season ==
The Blue Devils finished the regular season 23–7 overall and 14–4 in ACC play to finish in third place. As the third seed in the ACC tournament, earned a bye into the quarterfinals, where they defeated sixth seed Louisville, 61–48. They defeated second seed and sixth ranked Notre Dame 61–56 in the semifinals. They won the final 76–62 over top seed, seventh ranked, rival NC State. The Blue Devils defeated three teams they lost to during the regular season on the way to their tournament title. Sophomore Oluchi Okananwa was named tournament MVP and Ashlon Jackson was named to the All-Tournament First Team. As tournament champions, they received an automatic bid to the NCAA tournament and were the two-seed in the Birmingham 2 region. They defeated fifteen seed Lehigh and ten seed Oregon at home to advance to the Sweet Sixteen. There they faced three seed and twelfth ranked North Carolina for a third time this season. After splitting the regular season games 1–1, Duke prevailed in the tournament to advance to the Elite Eight. There they lost to first seed and second ranked South Carolina 54–50 to end their season. The Blue Devils finished the season with a 29–8 record, and ranked seventh in both the AP and Coaches polls. Their 29 wins were the most since 2012–13.

== Off-season ==
=== Departures ===
Departures
Name	Number	Pos.	Height	Year	Hometown	Reason for departure
Vanessa de Jesus	2	G	5'8"	Graduate student	Valencia, California	Graduated; transferred to Notre Dame
Oluchi Okananwa	5	G	5'10"	Sophomore	Boston, Massachusetts	Transferred to Maryland
Louann Battiston	7	G	5'5"	Sophomore	Montigny-le-Tilleul, Belgium	Transferred to Rice
Reigan Richardson	24	G	5'11"	Senior	Charlotte, North Carolina	Graduated
Jenessa Cotton	42	F	6'2"	Freshman	Orange, California	Transferred to Kansas State

=== Incoming transfers ===
Incoming transfers
Name	Number	Pos.	Height	Year	Hometown	Previous school
Hailey Johnson	42	F	5'11"	Graduate student	Coto de Caza, California	Pepperdine

=== Recruiting class ===
College recruiting
Name	Hometown	School	Height	Weight	Commit date
Emilee Skinner; G	Providence, Utah	Ridgeline High School	6 ft 0 in (1.83 m)	N/A	
Emilee Skinner; G	Recruit ratings: ESPN: (97)				
Anna Wikstrom; G	Bergen, Norway	Ulriken Eagles	5 ft 11 in (1.80 m)	N/A	
Anna Wikstrom; G	Recruit ratings: ESPN: (NR)				
Overall recruit ranking:
Note: In many cases, Scout, Rivals, 247Sports, On3, and ESPN may conflict in their listings of height and weight.; In these cases, the average was taken. ESPN grades are on a 100-point scale.; Sources:

== Roster ==
2025–26 Duke Blue Devils women's basketball team
Players
Coaches

Pos.	#	Name	Height	Year	Previous school	Hometown
G/F	2	Jadyn Donovan	6 ft 0 in (1.83 m)	Jr	Sidwell Friends	Washington, D.C.
G	3	Ashlon Jackson	6 ft 0 in (1.83 m)	Sr	Hardin-Jefferson	China, TX
G	4	Riley Nelson	6 ft 2 in (1.88 m)	RS So	Bullis School; Maryland	Clarksburg, MD
G	5	Emilee Skinner	6 ft 0 in (1.83 m)	Fr	Ridgeline	Providence, UT
F	12	Delaney Thomas	6 ft 3 in (1.91 m)	Jr	St. John's College	Charles Town, WV
F	13	Jordan Wood	6 ft 4 in (1.93 m)	Jr	Carmel	Chicago, IL
G	15	Emma Koabel	5 ft 11 in (1.8 m)	Sr	Niagara Prep	Port Colborne, ON
C	21	Arianna Roberson	6 ft 4 in (1.93 m)	RS Fr	Clark	San Antonio, TX
G	22	Taina Mair	5 ft 9 in (1.75 m)	Sr	Brooks School; Boston College	Boston, MA
G	25	Anna Wikstrom	5 ft 11 in (1.8 m)	Fr	Ulriken Eagles	Bergen, Norway
F	35	Toby Fournier	6 ft 2 in (1.88 m)	So	Crestwood Prep	Toronto, Canada
F	42	Hailey Johnson	5 ft 11 in (1.8 m)	GS	JSerra Catholic; Pepperdine	Coto de Caza, CA
G	53	Olivia Martin	5 ft 6 in (1.68 m)	So	Quince Orchard	Gaithersburg, MD

Head coach

- Kara Lawson (Tennessee)

Assistant coach(es)

- Tia Jackson (Iowa)
- Kyra Elzy (Tennessee)
- Karen Lange (Iowa)
- Karen Middleton (South Carolina)
- Pierre Miller (Presbyterian)

Legend

- (C) Team captain
- (S) Suspended
- (I) Ineligible
- (W) Walk-on
- Injured
- Current redshirt

Roster
Last update: September 23, 2025

== Schedule and results ==
Date time, TV	Rank^{#}	Opponent^{#}	Result	Record	High points	High rebounds	High assists	Site (attendance) city, state
Regular season
November 3, 2025*; 12:00 p.m., ESPN	No. 7	vs. No. 16 Baylor; Oui-Play	L 52–58	0–1	16 – Fournier	10 – Fournier	4 – Mair	Adidas Arena (5,712); Paris, France
November 9, 2025*; 1:00 p.m., ACCNX	No. 7	Holy Cross	W 91–48	1–1	27 – Fournier	13 – Thomas	7 – Mair	Cameron Indoor Stadium (2,788); Durham, NC
November 12, 2025*; 7:00 p.m., ACCNX	No. 15	Norfolk State	W 83–32	2–1	18 – Mair	8 – Wood	5 – Skinner	Cameron Indoor Stadium (2,140); Durham, NC
November 14, 2025*; 7:00 p.m., ESPNU	No. 15	vs. West Virginia; Greenbrier Tip-Off	L 49–57	2–2	10 – Mair	6 – Roberson	6 – Jackson	Colonial Hall (1,200); White Sulphur Springs, WV
November 16, 2025*; 2:00 p.m., ESPN+	No. 15	at Liberty	W 71–57	3–2	18 – Fournier	11 – Roberson	7 – Mair	Liberty Arena (2,404); Lynchburg, VA
November 20, 2025*; 8:00 p.m., ESPNU		at South Florida	L 72–85	3–3	19 – Mair	9 – Mair	3 – Mair	Yuengling Center (2,772); Tampa, FL
November 26, 2025*; 4:30 p.m, TruTV		vs. No. 2 South Carolina; Players Era Women's Championship Semifinal	L 66–83	3–4	16 – Fournier	7 – Tied	8 – Mair	Michelob Ultra Arena; Las Vegas, NV
November 27, 2025*; 10:30 p.m., TruTV		vs. No. 3 UCLA; Players Era Women's Championship Consolation Game	L 59–89	3–5	18 – Jackson	10 – Fournier	8 – Mair	Michelob Ultra Arena; Las Vegas, NV
December 4, 2025*; 9:00 p.m., ESPN		No. 5 LSU; ACC–SEC Challenge	L 77–93	3–6	16 – Jackson	7 – Mair	7 – Mair	Cameron Indoor Stadium (4,871); Durham, NC
December 7, 2025; 2:00 p.m., ACCN		at Virginia Tech	W 70–54	4–6 (1–0)	19 – Fournier	9 – Fournier	4 – Nelson	Cassell Coliseum (4,797); Blacksburg, VA
December 18, 2025*; 7:00 p.m., ACCN		South Dakota State	W 97–54	5–6	22 – Mair	9 – Fournier	7 – Nelson	Cameron Indoor Stadium (2,493); Durham, NC
December 20, 2025*; 2:00 p.m., ESPN+		at Belmont	W 76–46	6–6	26 – Fournier	16 – Fournier	8 – Jackson	Curb Event Center (1,154); Nashville, TN
December 28, 2025; 4:00 p.m., ACCN		at Syracuse	W 71–51	7–6 (2–0)	22 – Fournier	12 – Roberson	6 – Mair	JMA Wireless Dome (3,881); Syracuse, NY
January 1, 2026; 1:00 p.m., ACCNX		Boston College	W 100–49	8–6 (3–0)	20 – Nelson	8 – Tied	7 – Jackson	Cameron Indoor Stadium (2,882); Durham, NC
January 4, 2026; 12:00 p.m., ACCN		No. 18 Notre Dame	W 82–68	9–6 (4–0)	23 – Mair	12 – Thomas	6 – Mair	Cameron Indoor Stadium (4,244); Durham, NC
January 8, 2026; 7:00 p.m., ACCN		at California	W 78–74	10–6 (5–0)	20 – Tied	10 – Mair	7 – Jackson	Haas Pavilion (985); Berkeley, CA
January 11, 2026; 5:00 p.m., ESPN		at Stanford	W 67–60	11–6 (6–0)	19 – Thomas	6 – Tied	4 – Tied	Maples Pavilion (3,908); Stanford, CA
January 15, 2026; 8:00 p.m., ACCN		Virginia	W 65–58	12–6 (7–0)	25 – Fournier	9 – Fournier	6 – Mair	Cameron Indoor Stadium (2,533); Durham, NC
January 18, 2026; 6:00 p.m., ACCN		Georgia Tech	W 93–46	13–6 (8–0)	11 – Foster	7 – Turnage	3 – Turnage	Cameron Indoor Stadium (3,200); Durham, NC
January 24, 2026; 4:00 p.m., ACCNX	No. 21	at Pittsburgh	W 95–41	14–6 (9–0)	19 – Tied	12 – Roberson	7 – Tied	Petersen Events Center (1,233); Pittsburgh, PA
January 29, 2026; 8:00 p.m., ACCN	No. 20	at Miami (FL)	W 74–58	15–6 (10–0)	23 – Fournier	11 – Fournier	6 – Tied	Watsco Center (897); Coral Gables, FL
February 1, 2026; 12:00 p.m., ACCN	No. 20	Wake Forest; Rivalry	W 80–44	16–6 (11–0)	16 – Nelson	11 – Tied	5 – Nelson	Cameron Indoor Stadium (2,502); Durham, NC
February 5, 2026; 7:00 p.m., ACCN	No. 17	at No. 6 Louisville	W 59–58	17–6 (12–0)	15 – Fournier	9 – Tied	4 – Mair	KFC Yum! Center (10,553); Louisville, KY
February 8, 2026; 2:00 p.m., The CW	No. 17	SMU	W 95–36	18–6 (13–0)	26 – Fournier	16 – Roberson	10 – Jackson	Cameron Indoor Stadium (3,664); Durham, NC
February 15, 2026; 1:00 p.m., ABC	No. 11	No. 21 North Carolina; Rivalry	W 72–68	19–6 (14–0)	14 – Tied	12 – Fournier	7 – Mair	Cameron Indoor Stadium (9,314); Durham, NC
February 19, 2026; 7:00 p.m., ESPN	No. 9	NC State; Rivalry	W 83–65	20–6 (15–0)	26 – Fournier	12 – Fournier	9 – Mair	Cameron Indoor Stadium (4,951); Durham, NC
February 22, 2026; 2:00 p.m., ESPN2	No. 9	at Clemson	L 51–53	20–7 (15–1)	18 – Fournier	7 – Fournier	4 – Tied	Littlejohn Coliseum (3,218); Clemson, SC
February 26, 2026; 8:00 p.m., ACCN	No. 12	Florida State	W 80–52	21–7 (16–1)	22 – Fournier	20 – Thomas	8 – Mair	Cameron Indoor Stadium (3,020); Durham, NC
March 1, 2026; 12:00 p.m., ESPN	No. 12	at No. 21 North Carolina; Rivalry	L 69–74	21–8 (16–2)	17 – Jackson	7 – Mair	5 – Mair	Carmichael Arena (6,319); Chapel Hill, NC
2026 Ally ACC Women's Tournament
March 6, 2026*; 11:00 a.m., ACCN	(1) No. 13	vs. (9) Clemson; Quarterfinals	W 60–46	22–8	17 – Fournier	10 – Fournier	4 – Jackson	Gas South Arena (8,233); Duluth, GA
March 7, 2026*; 12:00 p.m., ESPN2	(1) No. 13	vs. (5) Notre Dame; Semifinals	W 65–63	23–8	16 – Miar	10 – Thomas	8 – Miar	Gas South Arena (6,604); Duluth, GA
March 8, 2026*; 1:00 p.m., ESPN	(1) No. 13	vs. (2) No. 12 Louisville; Final	W 70–65 ^{OT}	24–8	19 – Tied	12 – Mair	6 – Jackson	Gas South Arena (6,592); Duluth, GA
2026 NCAA Tournament
March 20, 2026*; 11:30 a.m., ESPN2	(3 S2) No. 8	(14 S2) Charleston; First Round	W 81–64	25–8	24 – Fournier	9 – Thomas	9 – Jackson	Cameron Indoor Stadium (3,435); Durham, NC
March 22, 2026*; 4:00 p.m., ESPN	(3 S2) No. 8	(6 S2) No. 21 Baylor; Second Round	W 69–46	26–8	17 – Thomas	10 – Roberson	8 – Mair	Cameron Indoor Stadium (3,907); Durham, NC
March 27, 2026*; 10:00 p.m., ESPN	(3 S2) No. 8	vs. (2 S2) No. 5 LSU; Sweet Sixteen	W 87–85	27–8	22 – Tied	10 – Roberson	5 – Jackson	Golden 1 Center (9,446); Sacramento, CA
March 29, 2026*; 3:00 p.m., ABC	(3 S2) No. 8	vs. (1 S2) No. 2 UCLA; Elite Eight	L 58–70	27–9	21 – Mair	7 – Mair	6 – Mair	Golden 1 Center (9,627); Sacramento, CA
*Non-conference game. ^{#}Rankings from AP Poll. (#) Tournament seedings in parentheses. S2=Sacramento 2. All times are in Eastern Time.

== Rankings ==
Ranking movements Legend: ██ Increase in ranking ██ Decrease in ranking — = Not ranked RV = Received votes
	Week																				
Poll	Pre	1	2	3	4	5	6	7	8	9	10	11	12	13	14	15	16	17	18	19	Final
AP	7	15	RV	—	—	—	—	—	—	RV	RV	21	20	17	11	9	12	13	8	8	5
Coaches	6	11	24	RV	RV	RV	RV	RV	RV	—	RV	RV	RV	22	15	13	14	14	10	10	5
