= Sienna Betts =

American basketball player (born 2006)

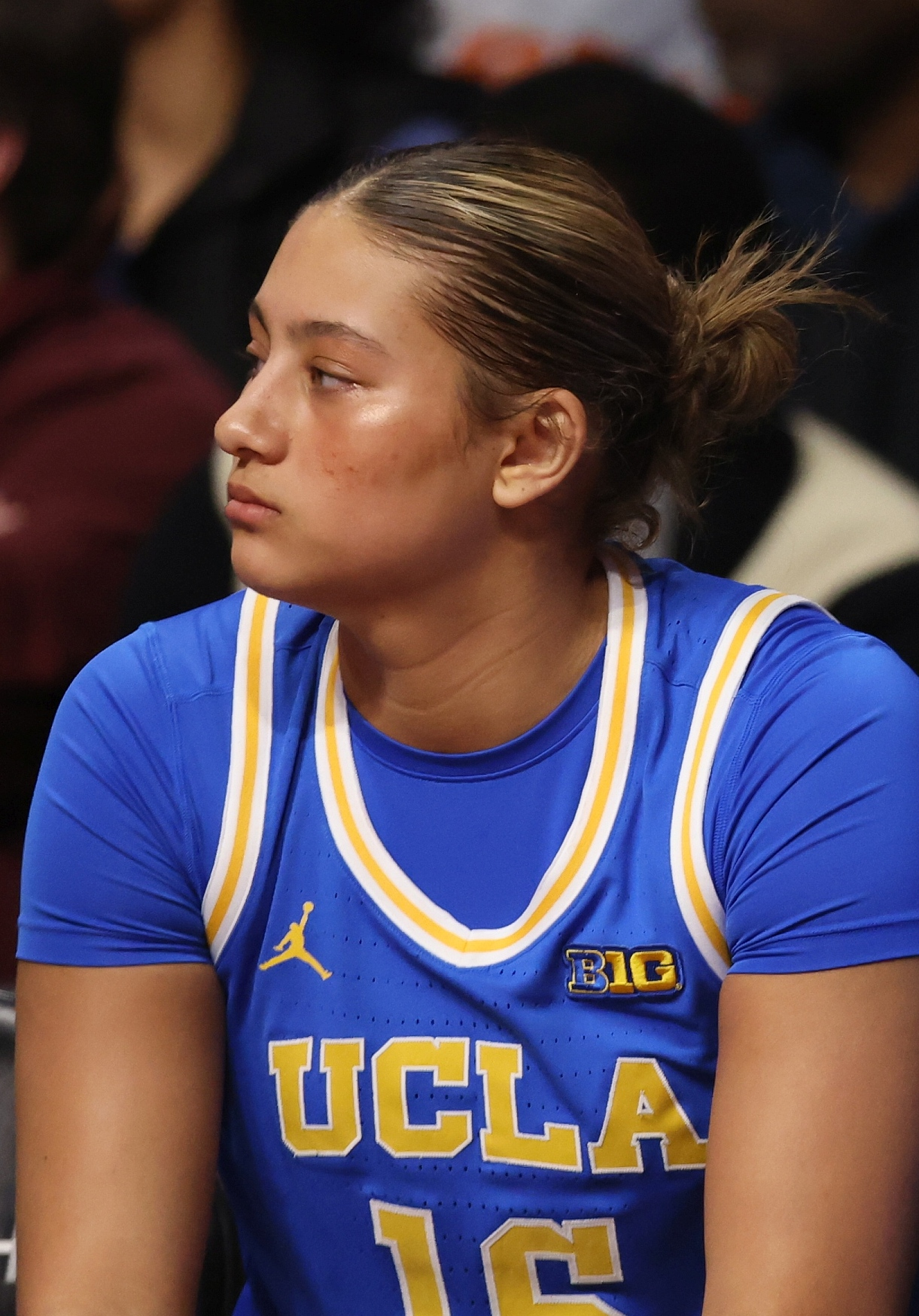
- Betts with UCLA in 2026

No. 16 – UCLA Bruins
- Position: Forward
- League: Big Ten Conference

Personal information
- Born: October 3, 2006 (age 20) Barcelona, Spain
- Listed height: 6 ft 4 in (1.93 m)

Career information
- High school: Grandview (Aurora, Colorado)
- College: UCLA (2025–present)

Career highlights
- NCAA champion (2026); Big Ten All-Freshman Team (2026); Morgan Wootten National Player of the Year (2025); McDonald's All-American Game MVP (2025); Nike Hoop Summit (2025)
Medals
Women's basketball
Representing the United States
FIBA Under-19 World Cup
Gold medal – first place	2025 Czech Republic	Team
FIBA Under-18 AmeriCup
Gold medal – first place	2024 Colombia	Team

Sienna Betts (born October 3, 2006) is an American college basketball player for the UCLA Bruins of the Big Ten Conference. She attended Grandview High School and was a five-star recruit and one of the top players in the 2025 class.

== Early life ==
Betts was born in Vitoria-Gasteiz, Spain and moved around the country during her childhood due to the basketball career of her father, Andrew. Before focusing on basketball, she also played soccer.

Betts played basketball for Grandview High School in Aurora, Colorado. During her sophomore year, she averaged 21.6 points, 16.3 rebounds, 3.4 assists, 1.0 steals and 3.7 blocks per game. Following the season, she was named Colorado Gatorade Player of the Year and Ms. Colorado Basketball. During the 2023 Colorado class 6A state championship game, she scored 22 points and 20 rebounds, to help lead Grandview to the state championship. During her junior year, she averaged 22.5 points, 15.6 rebounds, 4.6 assists, 3.3 blocks and 2.2 steals and was named Colorado Gatorade Player of the Year for the second consecutive year. During her senior year, she averaged 23.5 points, 16.5 rebounds, 4.9 assists and 3.4 blocks and was named Colorado Gatorade Player of the Year for the third consecutive year. She was also named Morgan Wootten National Player of the Year.

On January 27, 2025, she was selected to play in the 2025 McDonald's All-American Girls Game. During the game she scored 16 points, seven rebounds, and two assists, and was named MVP.

=== Recruiting ===
Betts was considered a five-star recruit and the No. 2 player in the 2025 class by ESPN. In May 2023, she posted a list of semifinalist schools she was considering, including South Carolina, Duke, North Carolina, Notre Dame, Ohio State, UCLA, USC, UConn, Oregon, Arizona and Michigan. In November 2023, she verbally committed to play college basketball at UCLA alongside her sister Lauren.

== College career ==
Betts suffered a lower left-leg injury during a mid-October preseason scrimmage against UC Riverside. After missing the first ten games of the season, she made her collegiate debut for UCLA on December 16, 2025, in a game against Cal Poly. She recorded five points and two assists in ten minutes. During her freshman season she averaged 6.8 points, and four rebounds in 16 minutes per game off the bench. During the 2025–26 season, Betts and the Bruins won the National Championship. Following the season she was named to the Big Ten All-Freshman team by both the coaches and media.

== National team career ==
On May 18, 2024, Betts was named to the United States under-18 national team for the 2024 FIBA Under-18 Women's AmeriCup. During the tournament she averaged 13.2 points, 8 rebounds and 1.8 blocks per game. She led the tournament in efficiency (19.8) while averaging just 16.9 minutes per game. During the final against Canada she recorded 15 points and nine rebounds to help the United States win a gold medal. She was subsequently named to the all-tournament team.

On June 20, 2025, she was named to the United States under-19 national team for the 2025 FIBA Under-19 Women's Basketball World Cup. During the tournament she averaged a double-double of 14.6 points and 10.0 rebounds per game, along with 2.1 blocks per game. During the final against Australia, she scored 11 points and 11 rebounds to help the United States win a gold medal. She was subsequently named to the all-tournament team.

== Personal life ==
Betts' father Andrew was a center for the Great Britain and England national teams who played for several leading European clubs and was drafted by the NBA's Charlotte Hornets. Her mother, Michelle, played volleyball for Long Beach State, winning a national title in 1993. She has a sister, Lauren, who also played basketball at UCLA, and two brothers, Dylan and Ashton. Sienna played on a state champion team with Lauren in High School and an NCAA champion team with Lauren in college.

=== Business interests ===
On July 21, 2025, Betts and her sister, Lauren, were signed by Unrivaled, a 3x3 basketball league, to NIL deals as part of "The Future is Unrivaled Class of 2025".
