= Aaliyah Chavez =

American basketball player (born 2006)

No. 2 – Oklahoma Sooners
- Position: Guard
- League: SEC

Personal information
- Born: November 20, 2006 (age 19)
- Listed height: 5 ft 10 in (1.78 m)

Career information
- High school: Monterey High School (Lubbock, Texas)
- College: Oklahoma (2025–present)

Career highlights
- Second-team All-SEC (2026); SEC All-Freshman Team (2026); Gatorade National Player of the Year (2025); Naismith Prep Player of the Year Award (2025); McDonald's All-American Game (2025); MaxPreps National Player of the Year (2025); Nike Hoop Summit (2025); Jordan Brand Classic MVP (2025); Texas Miss Basketball (2025)

Aaliyah Chavez (born November 20, 2006) is an American college basketball player for the Oklahoma Sooners of the Southeastern Conference (SEC). She attended Monterey High School and was a five-star recruit and one of the top players in the 2025 class.

== High school career ==
Chavez attended Monterey High School. During her junior year she averaged 37.8 points, 10.1 rebounds, 4.4 assists and 3.5 steals per game. Following the season she was named Texas Gatorade Player of the Year.

During her senior year she averaged 34.9 points, 9.1 rebounds, 4.3 assists, 3.7 steals and 1.2 blocks per game. She led the Plainsmen to the 5A Division II state championship for the first time since 1981. Following the season she was named Texas Gatorade Player of the Year for the second consecutive year, Gatorade National Player of the Year, Naismith Prep Player of the Year, and MaxPreps National Basketball Player of the Year. She finished her high school career with 4,796 career points, 1,279 rebounds, 771 assists and 476 steals in 150 games. Her 4,796 points ranks her 14th on the all-time national scoring list. She holds school records for most points in a game (57), most assists in a season (240), three-pointers in a game (13), three-pointers in a season (194) and career three-pointers (639).

In January 2025, she was named a 2025 McDonald's All-American and selected to represent the United States at the 2025 Nike Hoop Summit.

=== Recruiting ===
Chavez is considered a five-star recruit and the third highest ranked player in the 2025 class, according to ESPN. On March 25, 2025, she announced on SportsCenter she would be committing to play college basketball at Oklahoma, over offers from, LSU, South Carolina, Texas, Texas Tech and UCLA.

== College career ==
During her freshman season, Chavez was named SEC Freshman of the Week eight times, tying Rhyne Howard for the most freshman weekly awards in SEC history. On November 12, 2025, against Kansas City, she scored a then career-high 29 points, while shooting 7-of-10 from three-point range. On November 30, 2025, against Florida State, she scored a career-high tying 29 points, to help Oklahoma win the Coconut Hoops Great Egret Division championship. On December 3, 2025, during the ACC–SEC Challenge against NC State, she scored a career-high 33 points. Her 33 points were the third most all-time in a single game by an Oklahoma freshman. She was subsequently named the Tamika Catchings National Freshman of the Week and SEC Freshman of the Week.

She led all SEC freshmen in scoring with 18.4 points, and averaged 4.2 assists, 3.8 rebounds and 1.5 steals per game. She leads the nation in free throw percentage at 93.4%, and has made an SEC record 53 consecutive free throws. Following the season she was named a second-team All-SEC and SEC All-Freshman team selection. She was the only freshman in the league to be named All-SEC.
