= Monterey High School (Lubbock, Texas) =

Coordinates: 33°33′3.12″N 101°53′6.00″W

- 3211 47th Street; Lubbock, TX 79413

Information
- Type: Public
- Established: 1955
- Principal: Jack Purkeypile
- Teaching staff: 136.93 (FTE)
- Enrollment: 2,117 (2024–2025)
- Student to teacher ratio: 15.76
- Colors: Columbia blue and scarlet
- Nickname: Plainsmen
- Website: www.lubbockisd.org/o/mhs

Monterey High School is a 5A high school located in central Lubbock, Texas, United States (Monterey High School became a 6A school at the beginning of the 2014–2015 academic year per the UIL realignment announcement of February 2012). Monterey is part of the Lubbock Independent School District. Established in 1955, Monterey was the third high school to be established in Lubbock, after Lubbock High School and Dunbar High School. Dunbar was later changed to a Junior High.

The current city of Lubbock started from the merger of two separate communities, Old Lubbock and Monterey. In a compromise move, the residents of Old Lubbock relocated to Monterey but renamed the new community Lubbock; the high school name is in remembrance to Lubbock's past.

In 2025, the school won the Girls Basketball 5A Division 2 State Championship.

== Notable alumni ==
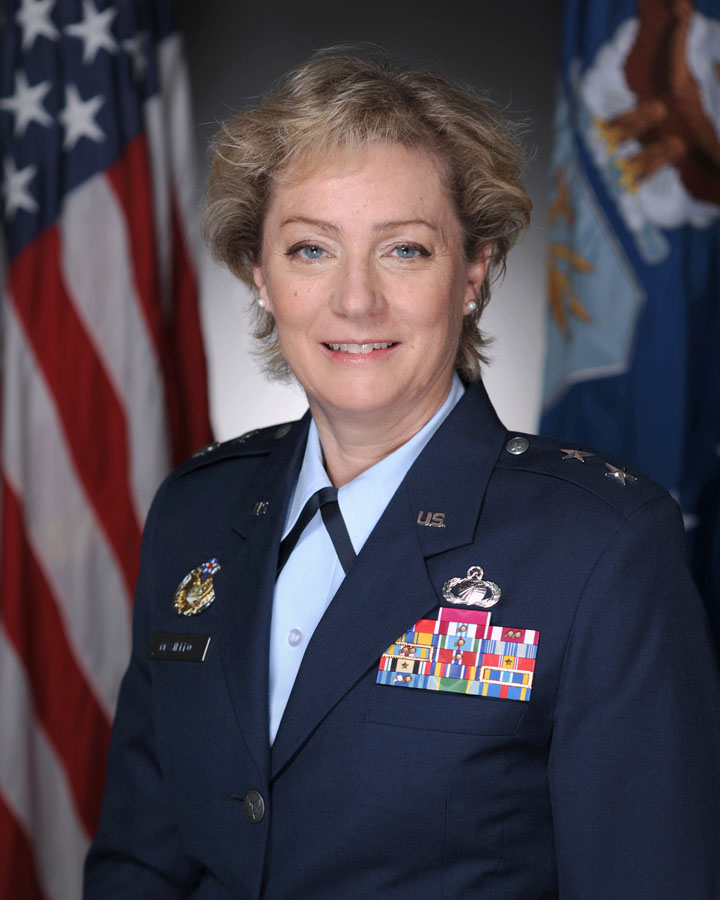
Maj. Gen. Wendy Motlong Masiello, USAF, a 1976 alumna of Lubbock's Monterey High School

- Terry Allen, singer-songwriter
- Gary Ashby, former head baseball coach at Texas Tech University
- Raymond Beadle, drag racer
- Kenny Bernstein, drag racer
- Chad Bettis, baseball player
- Dustin Burrows, Texas State Representative, District 83 (2015– )
- Aaliyah Chavez, basketball player
- Barry Corbin, actor
- Craig Ehlo, NBA player
- Joe Ely, guitarist, singer-songwriter
- Kamie Ethridge, women's basketball player
- Jimmie Dale Gilmore, singer-songwriter
- Glenna Goodacre, sculptor
- Butch Hancock, singer-songwriter
- Wendy M. Masiello, United States Air Force officer
- James Moeser, chancellor emeritus of the University of North Carolina, Chapel Hill
- Donnie Moore, MLB Baseball player
- Gerald Myers, Texas Tech University athletic director
- Arati Prabhakar, director, DARPA
- Ron Reeves
- Duane Whitaker, actor, screen writer
