= 2026–27 Big Ten Conference women's basketball season =

2023–27 Big Ten Conference women's basketball season
- League: NCAA Division I
- Sport: Basketball
- Teams: 18
- TV partner(s): Big Ten Network, Fox, FS1, Peacock

2026–27 NCAA Division I women's basketball season

Tournament

Basketball seasons
- 2025–26 2027–28

2026–27 Big Ten women's basketball standings
	Conf.				Overall
Team	W		L	PCT	W		L	PCT
Rutgers	0	–	0	–	4	–	0	1.000
Wisconsin	0	–	0	–	4	–	0	1.000
Indiana	0	–	0	–	3	–	0	1.000
Michigan State	0	–	0	–	3	–	0	1.000
No. 18 Minnesota	0	–	0	–	3	–	0	1.000
No. 25 Nebraska	0	–	0	–	3	–	0	1.000
No. 17 Ohio State	0	–	0	–	3	–	0	1.000
Purdue	0	–	0	–	3	–	0	1.000
No. 3 USC	0	–	0	–	3	–	0	1.000
No. 22 Illinois	0	–	0	–	2	–	0	1.000
No. 2 Michigan	0	–	0	–	2	–	0	1.000
No. 10т UCLA	0	–	0	–	2	–	0	1.000
No. 16 Washington	0	–	0	–	2	–	0	1.000
Oregon	0	–	0	–	3	–	1	.750
No. 10т Iowa	0	–	0	–	2	–	1	.667
No. 19т Maryland	0	–	0	–	1	–	1	.500
Northwestern	0	–	0	–	1	–	2	.333
Penn State	0	–	0	–	0	–	3	.000
† 2027 Big Ten tournament winner As of November 13, 2026; Rankings from AP poll

The 2026–27 Big Ten women's basketball season will begin with practices in October 2026, followed by the start of the 2026–27 NCAA Division I women's basketball season in November 2026. The regular season will end in March of 2027.

The season will be the conference's third with 18 teams. The conference announced that all teams will play 18 regular season conference games with each school playing one school both home and away, while facing 16 teams once.

== Head coaches ==
=== Coaching changes ===
==== Northwestern ====
On March 24, 2025, Joe McKeown announced he would retire following the conclusion of the 2025–26 season, after 18 years as head coach. On March 25, 2026, Carla Berube was named McKeown's successor.

==== Penn State ====
On March 5, 2026, Carolyn Kieger was fired after seven years as head coach. On March 19, 2026, Tanisha Wright was named Kieger's successor.

==== Rutgers ====
On March 2, 2026, Coquese Washington was fired after four years as head coach. On March 9, 2026, Gary Redus II was named Washington's successor.

=== Coaches ===
Team	Head coach	Previous job	Years at school	Overall record	Big Ten record	Big Ten titles	Big Ten Tournament titles	NCAA Tournaments	NCAA Final Fours	NCAA Championships
Illinois	Shauna Green	Dayton	5	85–47	39–33	0	0	3	0	0
Indiana	Teri Moren	Indiana State	13	264–126	130–80	1	0	7	0	0
Iowa	Jan Jensen	Iowa (Assoc.)	3	50–18	25–11	0	0	2	0	0
Maryland	Brenda Frese	Minnesota	25	631–178	170–41*	6	5	22	3	1
Michigan	Kim Barnes Arico	St. John's (Asst.)	15	312–151	144–94	0	0	9	0	0
Michigan State	Robyn Fralick	Bowling Green	4	67–28	34–20	0	0	3	0	0
Minnesota	Dawn Plitzuweit	West Virginia	4	69–36	26–28	0	0	1	0	0
Nebraska	Amy Williams	South Dakota	11	175–136	86–91	0	0	5	0	0
Northwestern	Carla Berube	Princeton	1	0–0	0–0	0	0	0	0	0
Ohio State	Kevin McGuff	Washington	14	251–117	129–67	4	1	9	0	0
Oregon	Kelly Graves	Gonzaga	13	264–136	18–18	0	0	7	0	0
Penn State	Tanisha Wright	Chicago Sky (Asst.)	1	0–0	0–0	0	0	0	0	0
Purdue	Katie Gearlds	Marian	6	74–81	29–60	0	0	1	0	0
Rutgers	Gary Redus II	LSU (Asst.)	1	0–0	0–0	0	0	0	0	0
UCLA	Cori Close	Florida State (Assoc.)	16	358–144	34–2	1	2	10	2	1
USC	Lindsay Gottlieb	Cleveland Cavaliers (Asst.)	6	111–49	26–10	1	0	4	0	0
Washington	Tina Langley	Rice	6	83–71	19–17	0	0	1	0	0
Wisconsin	Robin Pingeton	Missouri	2	16–18	5–13	0	0	0	0	0

Notes:

- All records, appearances, titles, etc. are from time with current school only.
- Year at school includes 2025–26 season.
- Overall and Big Ten records are from time at current school and are through the beginning of the season.
- Frese's ACC conference record excluded since Maryland began Big Ten Conference play in 2014–15.

== Awards and honors ==
=== Players of the Week ===
Throughout the conference regular season, Big Ten Conference offices named two players (Player and Freshman) of the week each Monday.

Week	Player of the week	Freshman of the week
November 9, 2026	Te'Yala Delfosse, Michigan; JuJu Watkins, USC	Saniyah Hall, USC
