= 2026–27 Northwestern Wildcats women's basketball team =

American college basketball season

2026–27 Northwestern Wildcats women's basketball
- Conference: Big Ten Conference
- Record: 3–4 (0–0 Big Ten)
- Head coach: Carla Berube (1st season)
- Associate head coach: Lauren Dillon
- Assistant coaches: Maggie Lyon; Mariya Moore; George Buaku
- Home arena: Welsh–Ryan Arena

2026–27 Big Ten women's basketball standings
	Conf.				Overall
Team	W		L	PCT	W		L	PCT
Rutgers	0	–	0	–	7	–	0	1.000
Indiana	0	–	0	–	6	–	0	1.000
No. 2 Michigan	0	–	0	–	5	–	0	1.000
Michigan State	0	–	0	–	5	–	0	1.000
No. 17 Minnesota	0	–	0	–	5	–	0	1.000
No. 23 Nebraska	0	–	0	–	5	–	0	1.000
No. 10 UCLA	0	–	0	–	5	–	0	1.000
No. 16 Washington	0	–	0	–	5	–	0	1.000
No. 21 Illinois	0	–	0	–	4	–	0	1.000
Oregon	0	–	0	–	6	–	1	.857
No. 8 Iowa	0	–	0	–	5	–	1	.833
No. 19т Ohio State	0	–	0	–	5	–	1	.833
Wisconsin	0	–	0	–	5	–	1	.833
No. 18 Maryland	0	–	0	–	4	–	1	.800
No. 4 USC	0	–	0	–	4	–	1	.800
Purdue	0	–	0	–	4	–	2	.667
Northwestern	0	–	0	–	3	–	4	.429
Penn State	0	–	0	–	1	–	4	.200
† 2027 Big Ten tournament winner As of November 22, 2026; Rankings from AP poll

The 2026–27 Northwestern Wildcats women's basketball team represents Northwestern University during the 2026–27 NCAA Division I women's basketball season. The Wildcats are led by first-year head coach Carla Berube and play their home games at the Welsh–Ryan Arena in Evanston, Illinois as a member of the Big Ten Conference.

== Previous season ==
The Wildcats finished the 2025–26 season 8–21 overall and 2–16 in Big Ten play, to finish in seventeenth place in the conference. They failed to qualify for the Big Ten tournament for the fourth straight season.

On March 24, 2025, after the conclusion of the 2024–25 season, head coach Joe McKeown announced that he would be retiring following the 2025–26 season after his then-upcoming 18th year with the program and his 40th as a head coach. At the time of his retirement, he was the winningest active head coach in the Big Ten, posting 276 wins.

On March 25, 2026, a year after the announcement and following the end of the 2025–26 season, Northwestern athletics Vice President Mark Jackson announced that Princeton women's basketball head coach Carla Berube had been named as the program's new head coach.

== Offseason ==
=== Departures ===
Northwestern departures
Name	Num	Pos.	Height	Year	Hometown	Reason for departure
Tate Lash	4	Guard	5'9"	Graduate student	Buford, GA	Graduated
Caroline Lau	7	Guard	5'9"	Senior	Westport, CT	Graduated
Angelina Hodgens	11	Guard	5'10"	Freshman	Staten Island, NY	Transferred to Sacred Heart
Sammy White	14	Guard	5'6"	Graduate student	Timonium, MD	Graduated
Grace Sullivan	22	Forward	6'4"	Senior	Antioch, IL	Graduated; went undrafted in the 2026 WNBA draft, signed a training camp contract with the Dallas Wings
Tayla Thomas	23	Forward	6'3"	Sophomore	East Orange, NJ	Transferred to Minnesota
DaiJa Turner	24	Forward	6'3"	Graduate student	Fayetteville, NC	Graduated
Lauren Trumpy	25	Forward	6'5"	Senior	Camp Hill, PA	Graduated

=== Incoming transfers ===
Northwestern incoming transfers
Name	Num	Pos.	Height	Year	Hometown	Previous school
Lexi Blue	4	Guard	6'2"	Junior	Orlando, FL	Kentucky
Lily Carmody	5	Guard	5'11"	Junior	Melbourne, Australia	Boston College
Camdyn Nelson	13	Guard	5'8"	Sophomore	Greenwich, CT	Syracuse
Jasmyn Cooper-Derba	30	Forward	6'1"	Sophomore	North Easton, MA	Syracuse

=== Recruiting class ===
College recruiting
Name	Hometown	School	Height	Weight	Commit date
Xyanna Walton; G	Chicago, IL	Butler College Prep	5 ft 10 in (1.78 m)	N/A	
Xyanna Walton; G	Recruit ratings: Rivals: 247Sports: ESPN: (91)				
Overall recruit ranking:
Note: In many cases, Scout, Rivals, 247Sports, On3, and ESPN may conflict in their listings of height and weight.; In these cases, the average was taken. ESPN grades are on a 100-point scale.; Sources: "2026 Player Commits". ESPN. Archived from the original on July 28, 2026.

== Roster ==
2026–27 Northwestern Wildcats women's basketball team
Players
Coaches

Pos.	#	Name	Height	Year	Previous school	Hometown
F	0	Rachel Mutombo	6 ft 3 in (1.91 m)	Sr	Our Lady of Good Counsel High School	Silver Spring, MD
G	1	Xamiya Walton	5 ft 7 in (1.7 m)	Jr	Butler College Prep	Chicago, IL
G	2	Xyanna Walton	6 ft 0 in (1.83 m)	Fr	Butler College Prep	Chicago, IL
G	3	Claire Keswick	6 ft 0 in (1.83 m)	Jr	Tabor Academy	Wrentham, MA
G	4	Lexi Blue	6 ft 2 in (1.88 m)	Jr	Lake Highland Prep; Kentucky	Orlando, FL
G	5	Lily Carmody	5 ft 11 in (1.8 m)	Jr	Melbourne Tigers; Boston College	Melbourne, Australia
G/F	8	Kat Righeimer	6 ft 1 in (1.85 m)	Jr	Sage Hill School	Costa Mesa, CA
F	9	Crystal Fuqu Wang	6 ft 2 in (1.88 m)	Sr	Sierra Canyon School	Beijing, China
F	10	Sandra Moreno	6 ft 1 in (1.85 m)	So	Institut Frederic Mompou	Barcelona, Spain
G	12	Casey Harter	5 ft 11 in (1.8 m)	Sr	Souderton Area High School	Harleysville, PA
G	13	Camdyn Nelson	5 ft 8 in (1.73 m)	So	St. Luke's School; Syracuse	Greenwich, CT
F	22	Brooke Golden	6 ft 3 in (1.91 m)	Fr	Tilton School	Chester, NH
F	23	Romana Jelenc	6 ft 3 in (1.91 m)	Fr	Celje First Grammar School	Železniki, Slovenia
F	30	Jasmyn Cooper-Derba	6 ft 1 in (1.85 m)	So	Noble and Greenough School; Syracuse	North Easton, MA
G	33	Amparo López	5 ft 9 in (1.75 m)	So	Maristas Colegio Sagrado Corazón Valencia	Valencia, Spain

Head coach

- Carla Berube (Connecticut)

Assistant coach(es)

- Lauren Dillon (Tufts)
- Maggie Lyon (Northwestern)
- Mariya Moore (USC)
- George Buaku (UC San Diego)

Legend

- (C) Team captain
- (S) Suspended
- (I) Ineligible
- (W) Walk-on
- Injured
- Current redshirt

Roster
Last update: July 28, 2026

== Schedule and results ==
Date time, TV	Rank^{#}	Opponent^{#}	Result	Record	High points	High rebounds	High assists	Site (attendance) city, state
Exhibition
October 30, 2026*; 7:00 p.m., B1G+		Lewis	W 71–39		–	–	–	Welsh–Ryan Arena; Evanston, IL
Regular season
November 3, 2026*; 7:00 p.m., B1G+		Milwaukee	W 64–60	1–0	21 – Carmody	12 – Cooper-Derba	6 – Carmody	Welsh–Ryan Arena (786); Evanston, IL
November 5, 2026*; 7:00 p.m., B1G+		Xavier	L 78–91	1–1	20 – Carmody	6 – Nelson	6 – Harter	Welsh–Ryan Arena (826); Evanston, IL
November 8, 2026*; 1:00 p.m.		at UIC	L 71–76	1–2	22 – Cooper-Derba	9 – Cooper-Derba	5 – Nelson	Credit Union 1 Arena (680); Chicago, IL
November 13, 2026*; 4:30 p.m., CBSSN		vs. No. 24 West Virginia; Greenbrier Tip-Off	L 53–66	1–3	12 – Nelson	8 – Carmody	5 – Carmody	Colonial Hall (1,020); White Sulphur Springs, WV
November 14, 2026*; 5:00 p.m., PassThaBall		vs. Appalachian State; Greenbrier Tip-Off	W 75–61	2–3	22 – Harter	10 – Carmody	5 – Carmody	Colonial Hall (1,020); White Sulphur Springs, WV
November 18, 2026*; 5:30 p.m., ESPN+		at Abilene Christian	L 65–73	2–4	27 – Harter	11 – Carmody	8 – Carmody	Moody Coliseum (1,423); Abilene, TX
November 21, 2026*; 1:00 p.m., B1G+		Northern Illinois	W 68–45	3–4	17 – Carmody	8 – Tied	5 – Nelson	Welsh–Ryan Arena (1,035); Evanston, IL
November 23, 2026*; 7:00 p.m., B1G+		Oakland						Welsh–Ryan Arena; Evanston, IL
November 27, 2026*; 11:00 a.m., B1G+		DePaul						Welsh–Ryan Arena; Evanston, IL
November 30, 2026*; 7:00 p.m., B1G+		Illinois State						Welsh–Ryan Arena; Evanston, IL
December 5, 2026; 1:00 p.m., BTN		Indiana						Welsh–Ryan Arena; Evanston, IL
December 13, 2026*; 2:00 p.m., ESPN+		at Kansas						Allen Fieldhouse; Lawrence, KS
December 16, 2026*; 11:00 a.m., Marquee		at Loyola Chicago						Joseph J. Gentile Arena; Chicago, IL
December 18, 2026*; 11:00 a.m., B1G+		George Washington						Welsh-Ryan Arena; Evanston, IL
December 21, 2026*; 7:00 p.m., B1G+		Eastern Illinois						Welsh–Ryan Arena; Evanston, IL
December 30, 2026; 8:00 p.m., B1G+		at UCLA						Pauley Pavilion; Los Angeles, CA
January 2, 2027; 4:00 p.m., B1G+		at USC						Galen Center; Los Angeles, CA
January 7, 2027; 7:00 p.m., BTN		Michigan State						Welsh–Ryan Arena; Evanston, IL
January 10, 2027; 1:00 p.m., B1G+		Washington						Welsh–Ryan Arena; Evanston, IL
January 14, 2027; 7:00 p.m., B1G+		at Iowa						Carver–Hawkeye Arena; Iowa City, IA
January 17, 2027; 2:00 p.m., B1G+		at Wisconsin						Kohl Center; Madison, WI
January 20, 2027; 7:00 p.m., B1G+		Nebraska						Welsh–Ryan Arena; Evanston, IL
January 23, 2027; 1:00 p.m., B1G+		Illinois						Welsh–Ryan Arena; Evanston, IL
January 28, 2027; 5:30 p.m., B1G+		at Ohio State						Value City Arena; Columbus, OH
January 31, 2027; 1:00 p.m., B1G+		at Rutgers						Jersey Mike's Arena; Piscataway, NJ
February 4, 2027; 7:00 p.m., BTN		Penn State						Welsh–Ryan Arena; Evanston, IL
February 7, 2027; 3:00 p.m., BTN		at Illinois						State Farm Center; Champaign, IL
February 12, 2027; 6:00 p.m., B1G+		at Michigan						Crisler Center; Ann Arbor, MI
February 16, 2027; 7:00 p.m., B1G+		Oregon						Welsh–Ryan Arena; Evanston, IL
February 21, 2027; 12:00 p.m., BTN		Maryland						Welsh–Ryan Arena; Evanston, IL
February 25, 2027; 7:00 p.m., B1G+		Minnesota						Welsh–Ryan Arena; Evanston, IL
February 28, 2027; 11:00 a.m., B1G+		at Purdue						Mackey Arena; West Lafayette, IN
*Non-conference game. ^{#}Rankings from AP Poll. (#) Tournament seedings in parentheses. All times are in Central.
