= 2026–27 Wisconsin Badgers women's basketball team =

American college basketball season

2026–27 Wisconsin Badgers women's basketball
- Conference: Big Ten Conference
- Record: 5–1 (0–0 Big Ten)
- Head coach: Robin Pingeton (2nd season)
- Associate head coach: Chris Bracey
- Assistant coaches: McGhee Mann; Ariel Massengale; Evan Johnston; Julia Ford
- Home arena: Kohl Center

2026–27 Big Ten women's basketball standings
| | Conf. | | | | Overall |
| Team | W | | L | PCT | W | | L | PCT |
|---|---|---|---|---|---|---|---|---|
| Indiana | 0 | – | 0 | – | 5 | – | 0 | 1.000 |
| No. 23 Nebraska | 0 | – | 0 | – | 5 | – | 0 | 1.000 |
| Rutgers | 0 | – | 0 | – | 5 | – | 0 | 1.000 |
| No. 2 Michigan | 0 | – | 0 | – | 4 | – | 0 | 1.000 |
| Michigan State | 0 | – | 0 | – | 4 | – | 0 | 1.000 |
| No. 17 Minnesota | 0 | – | 0 | – | 4 | – | 0 | 1.000 |
| Purdue | 0 | – | 0 | – | 4 | – | 0 | 1.000 |
| No. 10 UCLA | 0 | – | 0 | – | 4 | – | 0 | 1.000 |
| No. 16 Washington | 0 | – | 0 | – | 4 | – | 0 | 1.000 |
| No. 21 Illinois | 0 | – | 0 | – | 3 | – | 0 | 1.000 |
| Oregon | 0 | – | 0 | – | 5 | – | 1 | .833 |
| Wisconsin | 0 | – | 0 | – | 5 | – | 1 | .833 |
| No. 8 Iowa | 0 | – | 0 | – | 4 | – | 1 | .800 |
| No. 19т Ohio State | 0 | – | 0 | – | 4 | – | 1 | .800 |
| No. 4 USC | 0 | – | 0 | – | 3 | – | 1 | .750 |
| No. 18 Maryland | 0 | – | 0 | – | 2 | – | 1 | .667 |
| Northwestern | 0 | – | 0 | – | 2 | – | 3 | .400 |
| Penn State | 0 | – | 0 | – | 0 | – | 4 | .000 |
† 2027 Big Ten tournament winner As of November 18, 2026; Rankings from AP poll

The 2026–27 Wisconsin Badgers women's basketball team will represent the University of Wisconsin–Madison during the 2026–27 NCAA Division I women's basketball season. The Badgers will be led by second-year head coach Robin Pingeton, and will play their games at Kohl Center in Madison, Wisconsin as a member of the Big Ten Conference.

== Previous season ==
The Badgers finished the 2025–26 season 16–18, 5–13 in Big Ten play to finish in a tie for 14th place. As No. 15 seed in the Big Ten tournament where they lost in the first round to Illinois. They received an at-large bid to the WBIT as the No. 3 seed in the Utah bracket where they defeated Oregon State, Miami (FL) and Harvard in the first round, second round and quarterfinals before losing to Columbia in the semifinals.

== Offseason ==
=== Departures ===
Wisconsin Departures
| Name | Num | Pos. | Height | Year | Hometown | Reason for Departure |
|---|---|---|---|---|---|---|
| Destiny Howell | 1 | G | 6'0" | Graduate Student | Queens, NY | Graduated |
| Alie Bisballe | 2 | F | 6'4" | Sophomore | Lake City, MI | Transferred to Michigan State |
| Breauna Ware | 3 | G | 5'7" | (redshirt) Junior | Queens, NY | Transferred to Wake Forest |
| Lily Krahn | 4 | G | 5'10" | Senior | Prairie du Chien, WI | Graduated |
| Leena Patibandla | 5 | G | 6'0" | Junior | Canton, OH | Graduated |
| Jovana Spasovski | 11 | G/F | 6'0" | Sophomore | Belgrade, Serbia | Transferred |
| Ronnie Porter | 13 | G | 5'2" | Senior | St. Paul, MN | Graduated |
| Reese Jaramillio | 14 | G | 5'8" | Sophomore | Racine, WI | Walk-on; left team |
| Gift Uchenna Okeke | 15 | F | 6'3" | Senior | Ebonyi State, Nigeria | Graduated |

=== Incoming transfers ===
Wisconsin incoming transfers
| Name | Num | Pos. | Height | Year | Hometown | Previous School |
|---|---|---|---|---|---|---|
| Addie Deal | 3 | G | 6'0" | Sophomore | Irvine, CA | Iowa |
| Teagan Mallegni | 7 | G | 6'1" | Junior | McFarland, WI | Iowa |
| Caia Elisadez | 11 | G | 5'5" | Senior | Whittier, CA | Chattanooga |
| Kadidia Toure | 13 | F | 6'3" | Graduate Student | Silver Spring, MD | LIU |

==== Recruiting ====
College recruiting
| Name | Hometown | School | Height | Weight | Commit date |
|---|---|---|---|---|---|
| Adaline Sheplee; F | Rice Lake, WI | Rice Lake High School | 6 ft 2 in (1.88 m) | N/A | |
| Adaline Sheplee; F | Recruit ratings: Rivals: 247Sports: ESPN: (94) | | | | |
Overall recruit ranking:
Note: In many cases, Scout, Rivals, 247Sports, On3, and ESPN may conflict in their listings of height and weight.; In these cases, the average was taken. ESPN grades are on a 100-point scale.; Sources: "2026 Player Commits". ESPN. Archived from the original on August 9, 2026.

== Roster ==
2026–27 Wisconsin Badgers women's basketball team
Players
Coaches

| Pos. | # | Name | Height | Year | Previous school | Hometown |
|---|---|---|---|---|---|---|
| G | 0 | Nikki Kerstein | 5 ft 8 in (1.73 m) | So | Montini Catholic | Riverwoods, IL |
| G | 2 | Giselle Janowski | 5 ft 9 in (1.75 m) | Fr | Pewaukee | Pewaukee, WI |
| G | 3 | Addie Deal | 6 ft 0 in (1.83 m) | So | Mater Dei; Iowa | Irvine, CA |
| C | 6 | Dorja Iva Zaja | 6 ft 3 in (1.91 m) | So | Privatna Gimnazija Marul Zagreb | Zagreb, Croatia |
| G | 7 | Teagan Mallegni | 6 ft 1 in (1.85 m) | Jr | McFarland; Iowa | McFarland, WI |
| G | 9 | Alba Martín Mesa | 5 ft 6 in (1.68 m) | Jr | ÍES Pérez Galdós | Las Palmas de Gran Canaria, Spain |
| G | 10 | Adaline Sheplee | 6 ft 3 in (1.91 m) | Fr | Rice Lake | Rice Lake, WI |
| G | 11 | Caia Rose | 5 ft 5 in (1.65 m) | Sr | Mater Dei; Chattanooga | Whittier, CA |
| F | 13 | Kadidia Toure | 6 ft 3 in (1.91 m) | Jr | Our Lady of Good Counsel; LIU | Silver Spring, MD |
| G | 14 | Leah Nordin | 6 ft 3 in (1.91 m) | Fr | Shawano | Shawano, WI |
| G | 20 | Kyrah Daniels | 6 ft 0 in (1.83 m) | Sr | ThuderRidge; Missouri State | Highlands Ranch, CO |
| F | 22 | Shay Bollin | 6 ft 3 in (1.91 m) | GS | Bridgewater-Raynham; Illinois | Raynham, MA |
| G | 24 | Laci Steele | 5 ft 11 in (1.8 m) | Sr | Edmond North; NC State | Edmond, OK |
| G | 71 | Alicia Courthiau | 5 ft 10 in (1.78 m) | Fr | | Brussels, Belgium |

Head coach

- Robin Pingeton (St. Ambrose)

Assistant coach(es)

- Chris Bracey (West Texas A&M)
- McGhee Mann (South Carolina)
- Ariel Massengale (Tennessee)
- Evan Johnston (Arkansas)
- Julia Ford (Bentley)

Legend

- (C) Team captain
- (S) Suspended
- (I) Ineligible
- (W) Walk-on
- Injured
- Current redshirt

Roster

== Schedule and results ==
| Date time, TV | Rank^{#} | Opponent^{#} | Result | Record | High points | High rebounds | High assists | Site (attendance) city, state |
Exhibition
| October 28, 2026*; 6:30 p.m., B1G+ | | UW–Eau Claire | W 101–69 | | 25 – Sheplee | 8 – Steele | 6 – Tied | Kohl Center (2,651); Madison, WI |
Regular season
| November 3, 2026*; 6:30 p.m., B1G+ | | Bradley | W 71–65 | 1–0 | 17 – Mallegni | 6 – Tied | 4 – Mallegni | Kohl Center (2,541); Madison, WI |
| November 5, 2026*; 6:30 p.m., B1G+ | | Oakland | W 89–56 | 2–0 | 24 – Mallegni | 11 – Mallegni | 4 – Kerstein | Kohl Center (2,511); Madison, WI |
| November 8, 2026*; 2:00 p.m., B1G+ | | Grambling State | W 97–46 | 3–0 | 22 – Mallegni | 8 – Steele | 4 – Tied | Kohl Center (2,808); Madison, WI |
| November 11, 2026*; 6:30 p.m., B1G+ | | Delaware | W 90–48 | 4–0 | 24 – Mallegni | 4 – Tied | 4 – Tied | Kohl Center (2,435); Madison, WI |
| November 14, 2026*; 1:00 p.m., ESPN+ | | at Green Bay | L 76–81 | 4–1 | 16 – Deal | 5 – Sheplee | 5 – Courthiau | Kress Events Center (3,173); Green Bay, WI |
| November 17, 2026*; 6:30 p.m., B1G+ | | Marquette | W 73–48 | 5–1 | 14 – Steele | 11 – Steele | 3 – Tied | Kohl Center (2,643); Madison, WI |
| November 22, 2026*; 12:00 p.m., B1G+ | | Lafayette | | | | | | Kohl Center; Madison, WI |
| November 25, 2026*; 1:30 p.m., FloCollege | | vs. Auburn; Puerto Rico Shootout & Classic | | | | | | Coliseo Guillermo Angulo; San Juan, PR |
| November 26, 2026*; 11:30 a.m., FloCollege | | vs. Syracuse; Puerto Rico Shootout & Classic | | | | | | Coliseo Guillermo Angulo; San Juan, PR |
| December 2, 2026*; 6:30 p.m., B1G+ | | Western Michigan | | | | | | Kohl Center; Madison, WI |
| December 6, 2026; 2:00 p.m., B1G+ | | Illinois | | | | | | Kohl Center; Madison, WI |
| December 10, 2026*; 6:00 p.m. | | at Valapariso | | | | | | Athletics–Recreation Center; Valparaiso, IN |
| December 17, 2026*; 11:00 a.m., B1G+ | | Delaware State | | | | | | Kohl Center; Madison, WI |
| December 20, 2026*; 11:00 a.m., B1G+ | | Omaha | | | | | | Kohl Center; Madison, WI |
| December 29, 2026; 2:00 p.m., Peacock/NBCSN | | USC | | | | | | Kohl Center; Madison, WI |
| January 2, 2027; 4:00 p.m., B1G+ | | at Washington | | | | | | Alaska Airlines Arena; Seattle, WA |
| January 5, 2027; 9:00 p.m., B1G+ | | at Oregon | | | | | | Matthew Knight Arena; Eugene, OR |
| January 10, 2027; 2:00 p.m., B1G+ | | Ohio State | | | | | | Kohl Center; Madison, WI |
| January 14, 2027; 6:00 p.m., BTN | | at Purdue | | | | | | Mackey Arena; West Lafayette, IN |
| January 17, 2027; 2:00 p.m., B1G+ | | Northwestern | | | | | | Kohl Center; Madison, WI |
| January 21, 2027; 7:30 p.m., BTN | | at Minnesota | | | | | | The Barn; Minneapolis, MN |
| January 24, 2027; 2:00 p.m., B1G+ | | Rutgers | | | | | | Kohl Center; Madison, WI |
| January 28, 2027; 6:00 p.m., BTN | | Maryland | | | | | | Kohl Center; Madison, WI |
| January 31, 2027; 2:00 p.m., B1G+ | | at Iowa | | | | | | Carver–Hawkeye Arena; Iowa City, IA |
| February 4, 2027; 6:30 p.m., B1G+ | | Minnesota | | | | | | Kohl Center; Madison, WI |
| February 11, 2027; 8:00 p.m., FS1 | | UCLA | | | | | | Kohl Center; Madison, WI |
| February 14, 2027; 1:00 p.m., B1G+ | | at Indiana | | | | | | Simon Skjodt Assembly Hall; Bloomington, IN |
| February 17, 2027; 7:00 p.m., B1G+ | | at Nebraska | | | | | | Pinnacle Bank Arena; Lincoln, NE |
| February 20, 2027; 12:00 p.m., BTN | | Michigan | | | | | | Kohl Center; Madison, WI |
| February 25, 2027; 5:00 p.m., B1G+ | | at Michigan State | | | | | | Breslin Center; East Lansing, MI |
| February 28, 2027; 12:00 p.m., B1G+ | | at Penn State | | | | | | Rec Hall; State College, PA |
Big Ten Women's Tournament
| March 3–7, 2027; TBA | | vs. | | | | | | T-Mobile Arena; Paradise, NV |
*Non-conference game. ^{#}Rankings from AP Poll. (#) Tournament seedings in parentheses. All times are in Central.

== See also ==
- 2026–27 Wisconsin Badgers men's basketball team
