= 2026–27 Rutgers Scarlet Knights women's basketball team =

American college basketball season

2026–27 Rutgers Scarlet Knights women's basketball
- Conference: Big Ten Conference
- Record: 7–0 (0–0 Big Ten)
- Head coach: Gary Redus II (1st season)
- Assistant coaches: Daphne Mitchell; Manisha Redus; Preston Beverly; LaDazhia Williams; Lauren Hansen
- Home arena: Jersey Mike's Arena

2026–27 Big Ten women's basketball standings
	Conf.				Overall
Team	W		L	PCT	W		L	PCT
Rutgers	0	–	0	–	7	–	0	1.000
Indiana	0	–	0	–	6	–	0	1.000
No. 2 Michigan	0	–	0	–	5	–	0	1.000
Michigan State	0	–	0	–	5	–	0	1.000
No. 17 Minnesota	0	–	0	–	5	–	0	1.000
No. 23 Nebraska	0	–	0	–	5	–	0	1.000
No. 10 UCLA	0	–	0	–	5	–	0	1.000
No. 16 Washington	0	–	0	–	5	–	0	1.000
No. 21 Illinois	0	–	0	–	4	–	0	1.000
Oregon	0	–	0	–	6	–	1	.857
No. 8 Iowa	0	–	0	–	5	–	1	.833
No. 19т Ohio State	0	–	0	–	5	–	1	.833
Wisconsin	0	–	0	–	5	–	1	.833
No. 18 Maryland	0	–	0	–	4	–	1	.800
No. 4 USC	0	–	0	–	4	–	1	.800
Purdue	0	–	0	–	4	–	2	.667
Northwestern	0	–	0	–	3	–	4	.429
Penn State	0	–	0	–	1	–	4	.200
† 2027 Big Ten tournament winner As of November 22, 2026; Rankings from AP poll

The 2026–27 Rutgers Scarlet Knights women's basketball team represents Rutgers University during the 2026–27 NCAA Division I women's basketball season. The Scarlet Knights are led by first-year head coach Gary Redus II, and play their games at the Jersey Mike's Arena in Piscataway, New Jersey as members of the Big Ten Conference.

== Previous season ==
The Scarlet Knights finished the 2025–26 season 9–20 overall and 1–17 in Big Ten play, their worst conference record in program history, to finish last in the Big Ten. They failed to qualify for the Big Ten tournament.

On March 2, two days after the conclusion of the season, Rutgers athletic director Keli Zinn announced that head coach Coquese Washington had been fired after four seasons with the program, which she posted a 42–84 record. A week later on March 9, LSU women's basketball assistant coach Gary Redus II was announced as the program's new head coach.

On March 17, four-star recruit Chante Murray, who had signed with the Scarlet Knights in October, announced that she had decommitted from the program and signed with West Virginia. However, on April 3, the team acquired an additional commitment from four-star guard Chikae Desdunes, who decommitted from Penn State on March 24.

== Offseason ==
A new coaching staff joined head coach Gary Redus. Assistant coach Daphne Mitchell, also from the LSU staff, joined the Rutgers coaching staff. Manisha Redus, sister of Gary, joined from Florida Atlantic. Preston Beverly was an assistant coach at Missouri. LaDazhia Williams, a player on the national champion 2022–23 LSU Tigers women's basketball team, joined in her first coaching role after playing professionally.

=== Departures ===
Rutgers Departures
Name	Num	Pos.	Height	Year	Hometown	Reason for Departure
Kaylah Ivey	2	Guard	5'8"	Graduate Student	Forestville, MD	Graduated
Makaylah Moore	3	Guard	6'0"	Freshman	Brooklyn, NY	Transferred to Maryland Eastern Shore
Antonia Bates	4	Guard-Forward	6'3"	Senior	Easton, PA	Graduated, transferred to Georgia Tech
Nene Ndiaye	10	Forward	6'1"	Junior	Saly, Senegal	Transferred to Oklahoma State
Faith Blackstone	12	Guard	6'0"	Graduate Student	Harrisburg, PA	Graduated
Fatima Diakhate	21	Forward	6'5"	(redshirt) Senior	Dakar, Senegal	Left team (Note: Previously joined the team as an incoming transfer from Pittsburgh, left program and withdrew from Rutgers prior to start of season on August 25.)
Yacine Ndiaye	32	Forward	6'4"	Junior	Pout, Senegal	Transferred to Mount St. Mary's
Janae Walker	44	Forward	6'3"	Junior	Tyrone, GA	Transferred to Virginia

On August 25, it was announced that incoming senior transfer Fatima Diakhate had departed from the program prior to the start of the season.

=== Incoming transfers ===
Rutgers incoming transfers
Name	Num	Pos.	Height	Year	Hometown	Previous School
Mya Pauldo	2	Guard	5'6"	Sophomore	Paterson, NJ	Tennessee
Mia Pauldo	3	Guard	5'6"	Sophomore	Paterson, NJ	Tennessee
Jaylah Lampley	10	Guard	6'1"	Sophomore	Fishers, IN	Mississippi State
Hope Masonius	13	Guard	5'9"	Junior	Spring Lake, NJ	Bucknell
Zennia Thomas	24	Forward	6'2"	Graduate Student	Cleveland, OH	Howard
Tara Daye	44	Guard	5'10"	Graduate Student	Newark, NJ	Purdue

=== Recruiting class ===
College recruiting
Name	Hometown	School	Height	Weight	Commit date
Chikae Desdunes; G	New Orleans, LA	DME Academy	5 ft 9 in (1.75 m)	N/A	
Chikae Desdunes; G	Recruit ratings: Rivals: 247Sports: ESPN: (94)				
Overall recruit ranking:
Note: In many cases, Scout, Rivals, 247Sports, On3, and ESPN may conflict in their listings of height and weight.; In these cases, the average was taken. ESPN grades are on a 100-point scale.; Sources: "2026 Player Commits". ESPN. Archived from the original on July 30, 2026.

== Roster ==
Years are listed according to the new NCAA age-based eligibility model.

2026–27 Rutgers Scarlet Knights women's basketball team
Players
Coaches

Pos.	#	Name	Height	Year	Previous school	Hometown
G	0	Chikae Desdunes	5 ft 9 in (1.75 m)	Fr	DME Academy	New Orleans, LA
G	1	Lauryn Swann	5 ft 7 in (1.7 m)	Jr	Long Island Lutheran High School; Arizona	Queens, NY
G	2	Mya Pauldo	5 ft 6 in (1.68 m)	So	Morris Catholic High School; Tennessee	Paterson, NJ
G	3	Mia Pauldo	5 ft 6 in (1.68 m)	So	Morris Catholic High School; Tennessee	Paterson, NJ
G	5	Deja Young (W)	5 ft 9 in (1.75 m)	GS	Teaneck High School	Teaneck, NJ
F	6	Natassja Kolf	6 ft 2 in (1.88 m)	Jr		Neuquen, Argentina
F	7	Precious Gem Wheeler	6 ft 3 in (1.91 m)	So	Franklin High School	Franklin, NJ
G	10	Jaylah Lampley	6 ft 1 in (1.85 m)	So	Lawrence Central High School; Mississippi State	Fishers, IN
G	13	Hope Masonius	5 ft 9 in (1.75 m)	Jr	Manasquan High School; Bucknell	Spring Lake, NJ
G/F	22	Zachara Perkins	6 ft 3 in (1.91 m)	Jr	Summer Creek High School	Houston, TX
F	24	Zennia Thomas	6 ft 2 in (1.88 m)	GS	Warrensville Heights High School; Howard	Cleveland, OH
F	32	Imani Lester	6 ft 4 in (1.93 m)	GS	Kansas State	Raleigh, NC
G	33	Kennedy Brandt	5 ft 10 in (1.78 m)	Jr	Glenbard West High School	Glen Ellyn, IL
G	44	Tara Daye	5 ft 10 in (1.78 m)	GS	University High School; Purdue	Newark, NJ

Head coach

- Gary Redus II (South Alabama)

Assistant coach(es)

- Daphne Mitchell (Georgia Tech)
- Manisha Redus (Alabama)
- Preston Beverly (VMI)
- LaDazhia Williams (LSU)
- Lauren Hansen (Missouri)

Legend

- (C) Team captain
- (S) Suspended
- (I) Ineligible
- (W) Walk-on
- Injured
- Current redshirt

Roster
Last update: July 30, 2026

== Schedule and results ==
Date time, TV	Rank^{#}	Opponent^{#}	Result	Record	High points	High rebounds	High assists	Site (attendance) city, state
Exhibition
October 30, 2026*; 7:00 p.m., B1G+		Caldwell	W 104–49		17 – Desdunes	10 – Tied	4 – Tied	Jersey Mike's Arena (508); Piscataway, NJ
Regular season
November 2, 2026*; 7:00 p.m., B1G+		LIU	W 83–52	1–0	21 – Mia Pauldo	7 – Mia Pauldo	5 – Mia Pauldo	Jersey Mike's Arena (1,445); Piscataway, NJ
November 4, 2026*; 7:00 p.m., B1G+		La Salle	W 75–62	2–0	22 – Mia Pauldo	11 – Tied	6 – Mia Pauldo	Jersey Mike's Arena (1,214); Piscataway, NJ
November 8, 2026*; 2:00 p.m., B1G+		Indiana State	W 107–76	3–0	33 – Mia Pauldo	7 – Tied	4 – Daye	Jersey Mike's Arena (1,657); Piscataway, NJ
November 11, 2026*; 7:00 p.m., B1G+		Monmouth	W 64–62	4–0	17 – Mia Pauldo	7 – Tied	4 – Tied	Jersey Mike's Arena (1,606); Piscataway, NJ
November 16, 2026*; 7:00 p.m., B1G+		Albany	W 83–44	5–0	25 – Mia Pauldo	7 – Tied	7 – Mia Pauldo	Jersey Mike's Arena (1,584); Piscataway, NJ
November 19, 2026*; 11:00 a.m., B1G+		Maryland Eastern Shore	W 91–47	6–0	17 – Tied	10 – Thomas	6 – Pauldo	Jersey Mike's Arena (6,118); Piscataway, NJ
November 21, 2026*; 2:00 p.m., B1G+		Delaware State	W 93–43	7–0	23 – Thomas	10 – Daye	9 – Pauldo	Jersey Mike's Arena (1,668); Piscataway, NJ
November 25, 2026*; 12:00 p.m.		at Princeton; Rivalry						Jadwin Gymnasium; Princeton, NJ
November 27, 2026*; 7:00 p.m., BallerTV		vs. South Dakota State; Daytona Beach Classic						Ocean Center; Daytona Beach, FL
November 28, 2026*; 5:45 p.m., BallerTV		vs. Georgetown; Daytona Beach Classic						Ocean Center; Daytona Beach, FL
December 2, 2026*; 7:00 p.m., B1G+		Saint Peter's						Jersey Mike's Arena; Piscataway, NJ
December 5, 2026; 12:00 p.m., BTN		Ohio State						Jersey Mike's Arena; Piscataway, NJ
December 8, 2026*; 6:00 p.m., BTN		Seton Hall						Jersey Mike's Arena; Piscataway, NJ
December 13, 2026*; 2:00 p.m., B1G+		Coppin State						Jersey Mike's Arena; Piscataway, NJ
December 20, 2026*; 5:00 p.m., B1G+		Lafayette						Jersey Mike's Arena; Piscataway, NJ
December 29, 2027; 7:00 p.m., B1G+		at Indiana						Simon Skjodt Assembly Hall; Bloomington, IN
January 2, 2027; 3:00 p.m., B1G+		Illinois						Jersey Mike's Arena; Piscataway, NJ
January 5, 2027; 8:00 p.m., B1G+		at Iowa						Carver–Hawkeye Arena; Iowa City, IA
January 8, 2027; 6:00 p.m., B1G+		at Penn State						Bryce Jordan Center; State College, PA
January 11, 2027; 7:00 p.m., BTN		USC						Jersey Mike's Arena; Piscataway, NJ
January 17, 2027; 4:00 p.m., BTN		at Michigan						Crisler Center; Ann Arbor, MI
January 21, 2027; 7:00 p.m., B1G+		UCLA						Jersey Mike's Arena; Piscataway, NJ
January 24, 2027; 3:00 p.m., B1G+		at Wisconsin						Kohl Center; Madison, WI
January 28, 2027; 7:00 p.m., B1G+		Michigan State						Jersey Mike's Arena; Piscataway, NJ
January 31, 2027; 2:00 p.m., B1G+		Northwestern						Jersey Mike's Arena; Piscataway, NJ
February 7, 2027; TBA, B1G+		at Minnesota						The Barn; Minneapolis, MN
February 10, 2027; 7:00 p.m., B1G+		Penn State						Jersey Mike's Arena; Piscataway, NJ
February 14, 2027; 2:00 p.m., B1G+		Purdue						Jersey Mike's Arena; Piscataway, NJ
February 17, 2027; 10:00 p.m., B1G+		at Washington						Alaska Airlines Arena; Seattle, WA
February 20, 2027; 9:00 p.m., B1G+		at Oregon						Matthew Knight Arena; Eugene, OR
February 24, 2027; 7:00 p.m., B1G+		Nebraska						Jersey Mike's Arena; Piscataway, NJ
February 28, 2027; 12:00 p.m., BTN		at Maryland						Xfinity Center; College Park, MD
*Non-conference game. ^{#}Rankings from AP Poll. (#) Tournament seedings in parentheses. All times are in Eastern.
