= 2026–27 Michigan State Spartans women's basketball team =

American college basketball season

2026–27 Michigan State Spartans women's basketball
- Conference: Big Ten Conference
- Record: 5–0 (0–0 Big Ten)
- Head coach: Robyn Fralick (4th season)
- Associate head coach: Kim Cameron
- Assistant coaches: Maria Kasza; Bianca Smith
- Home arena: Breslin Center

2026–27 Big Ten women's basketball standings
	Conf.				Overall
Team	W		L	PCT	W		L	PCT
Indiana	0	–	0	–	6	–	0	1.000
Rutgers	0	–	0	–	6	–	0	1.000
No. 2 Michigan	0	–	0	–	5	–	0	1.000
Michigan State	0	–	0	–	5	–	0	1.000
No. 17 Minnesota	0	–	0	–	5	–	0	1.000
No. 23 Nebraska	0	–	0	–	5	–	0	1.000
No. 10 UCLA	0	–	0	–	5	–	0	1.000
No. 21 Illinois	0	–	0	–	4	–	0	1.000
No. 16 Washington	0	–	0	–	4	–	0	1.000
Oregon	0	–	0	–	6	–	1	.857
No. 8 Iowa	0	–	0	–	5	–	1	.833
No. 19т Ohio State	0	–	0	–	5	–	1	.833
Wisconsin	0	–	0	–	5	–	1	.833
Purdue	0	–	0	–	4	–	1	.800
No. 18 Maryland	0	–	0	–	3	–	1	.750
No. 4 USC	0	–	0	–	3	–	1	.750
Northwestern	0	–	0	–	2	–	4	.333
Penn State	0	–	0	–	1	–	4	.200
† 2027 Big Ten tournament winner As of November 20, 2026; Rankings from AP poll

The 2026–27 Michigan State Spartans women's basketball team currently represents Michigan State University during the 2026–27 NCAA Division I women's basketball season. The Spartans, led by fourth-year head coach Robyn Fralick, play their home games at the Breslin Center in East Lansing, Michigan, and compete as a member of the Big Ten Conference.

== Previous season ==
The Spartans finished the 2025–26 season 23–9 overall and 11–7 in Big Ten play, to finish seventh in the conference. As the No. 7 seed in the Big Ten tournament, they lost 69–71 to No. 10 Illinois in the second round.

Following the loss, the Spartans earned an at-large bid to the NCAA tournament, where they were seeded No. 5 in the Sacramento #4 Regional. They narrowly avoided an upset to No. 12 Colorado State in the first round, winning 65–62. They were then eliminated in the second round by No. 4 Oklahoma to end their season.

== Offseason ==
=== Departures ===
Michigan State departures
Name	Num	Pos.	Height	Year	Hometown	Reason for departure
Jordan Ode	0	Guard	6'0"	Freshman	Maple Grove, MN	Transferred to Georgia Tech
Rashunda Jones	1	Guard	5'8"	Junior	South Bend, IN	Transferred to Arizona State
Abbey Kimball	2	Guard	5'10"	Senior	Grand Rapids, MI	Graduated
Emma Shumate	5	Guard	6'1"	Senior	Dresden, OH	Graduated
Inés Sotelo	10	Forward	6'3"	Sophomore	Ourense, Spain	Transferred to Stanford
Grace VanSlooten	14	Forward	6'3"	Senior	Toledo, OH	Graduated; drafted 39th overall by the Seattle Storm in the 2026 WNBA draft
Jalyn Brown	23	Guard	6'1"	Senior	Baltimore, MD	Graduated; went undrafted in the 2026 WNBA draft, signed a training camp contract with the Seattle Storm
Marah Dykstra	32	Forward	6'2"	Senior	Vancouver, BC	Graduated
Juliann Woodard	33	Forward	6'0"	Sophomore	North Vernon, IN	Transferred to High Point

=== Incoming transfers ===
Michigan State incoming transfers
Name	Num	Pos.	Height	Year	Hometown	Previous school
Carter McCray	1	Forward	6'1"	Senior	Oberlin, OH	West Virginia
Anna Wypych	2	Guard	6'0"	Sophomore	Rockford, MI	Butler
Alie Bisballe	10	Forward	6'4"	Junior	Lake City, MI	Wisconsin
Uche Kaine	13	Forward	6'0"	Sophomore	Asaba, Nigeria	South Georgia Technical (NJCAA)
Tabitha Betson	17	Forward	6'2"	Junior	Melbourne, Australia	Colorado

=== Recruiting class ===
College recruiting
Name	Hometown	School	Height	Weight	Commit date
Lilly Williams; C	Farmington Hills, MI	Howell High School	6 ft 6 in (1.98 m)	N/A	
Lilly Williams; C	Recruit ratings: Rivals: 247Sports: ESPN: (96)				
Overall recruit ranking:
Note: In many cases, Scout, Rivals, 247Sports, On3, and ESPN may conflict in their listings of height and weight.; In these cases, the average was taken. ESPN grades are on a 100-point scale.; Sources: "2026 Player Commits". ESPN. Archived from the original on July 26, 2026.

== Roster ==
2026–27 Michigan State Spartans women's basketball team
Players
Coaches

Pos.	#	Name	Height	Year	Previous school	Hometown
F	1	Carter McCray	6 ft 1 in (1.85 m)	Sr	Elyria Catholic High School; West Virginia	Oberlin, OH
G	2	Anna Wypych	6 ft 0 in (1.83 m)	So	Rockford High School; Butler	Rockford, MI
G	4	Theryn Hallock	5 ft 10 in (1.78 m)	GS	Forest Hills Central High School	Grand Rapids, MI
G	5	Monique Bobongie	5 ft 10 in (1.78 m)	So		Mackay, Australia
G	8	Emma Broliron	5 ft 6 in (1.68 m)	Fr		Charmes-sur-Rhône, France
G	9	Sara Sambolić	5 ft 7 in (1.7 m)	Sr		Ljubljana, Slovenia
F	10	Alie Bisballe	6 ft 4 in (1.93 m)	Jr	Lake City High School; Wisconsin	Lake City, MI
F	12	Isaline Alexander	6 ft 3 in (1.91 m)	GS	Bill Crothers Secondary School	Keswick, ON
F	13	Uche Kaine	6 ft 0 in (1.83 m)	So	Standard Life School; South Georgia Technical College	Asaba, Nigeria
F	17	Tabitha Betson	6 ft 2 in (1.88 m)	Jr	DME Academy; Colorado	Melbourne, Australia
C	21	Lilly Williams	6 ft 6 in (1.98 m)	Fr	Howell High School	Farmington Hills, MI
F	22	Kathy-Emma Otto	6 ft 3 in (1.91 m)	Fr		Paris, France
G	24	Amy Terrian	5 ft 8 in (1.73 m)	So	Pewaukee High School	Pewaukee, WI
G	25	Anna Terrian	5 ft 8 in (1.73 m)	So	Pewaukee High School	Pewaukee, WI
G	35	Kennedy Blair	5 ft 9 in (1.75 m)	RS Jr	Divine Child High School	Dearborn, MI

Head coach

- Robyn Fralick (Davidson)

Assistant coach(es)

- Kim Cameron (Michigan Tech)
- Maria Kasza (Michigan Tech)
- Marwan Miller (Franklin)

Legend

- (C) Team captain
- (S) Suspended
- (I) Ineligible
- (W) Walk-on
- Injured
- Current redshirt

Roster
Last update: July 26, 2026

== Schedule and results ==
Date time, TV	Rank^{#}	Opponent^{#}	Result	Record	High points	High rebounds	High assists	Site (attendance) city, state
Exhibition
October 28, 2026*; 6:30 p.m., B1G+		Michigan Tech	W 100–53		21 – Bobongie	7 – Bobongie	5 – Tied	Breslin Center; East Lansing, MI
Regular season
November 3, 2026*; 6:30 p.m., B1G+		Valapariso	W 98–44	1–0	15 – Amy Terrian	7 – Tied	9 – Blair	Breslin Center (2,638); East Lansing, MI
November 7, 2026*; 2:00 p.m., ESPN+		at Toledo	W 72–64	2–0	28 – Blair	11 – Blair	4 – Blair	Savage Arena (4,543); Toledo, OH
November 11, 2026*; 6:30 p.m., B1G+		Oakland	W 91–50	3–0	18 – Hallock	10 – Otto	8 – Blair	Breslin Center (2,780); East Lansing, MI
November 15, 2026*; 2:00 p.m., ESPN+		at Harvard	W 75–53	4–0	19 – Blair	8 – Blair	10 – Blair	Lavietes Pavilion (860); Cambridge, MA
November 19, 2026*; 6:30 p.m., B1G+		Sacred Heart	W 78–49	5–0	17 – Blair	6 – Blair	7 – Sambolić	Breslin Center (2,789); East Lansing, MI
November 23, 2026*; 12:00 p.m., FloCollege		vs. Alcorn State; Emerald Coast Classic semifinals						Raider Arena; Niceville, FL
November 24, 2026*; 12:00 p.m./2:30 p.m., FloCollege		vs. Virginia Tech/UT Martin; Emerald Coast Classic						Raider Arena; Niceville, FL
November 29, 2026*; 6:30 p.m., B1G+		Eastern Michigan						Breslin Center; East Lansing, MI
December 3, 2026*; 6:30 p.m., B1G+		Maine						Breslin Center; East Lansing, MI
December 6, 2026; 4:00 p.m., BTN		Penn State						Breslin Center; East Lansing, MI
December 9, 2026*; 6:30 p.m., B1G+		Milwaukee						Breslin Center; East Lansing, MI
December 13, 2026*; 2:00 p.m., B1G+		DePaul						Breslin Center; East Lansing, MI
December 19, 2026*; 2:00 p.m., CBSSN		vs. Gonzaga; Acrisure Series						Acrisure Arena; Thousand Palms, CA
December 29, 2026; 6:00 p.m., FS1		at Michigan; Rivalry						Crisler Center; Ann Arbor, MI
January 1, 2027; 2:00 p.m., BTN		Iowa						Breslin Center; East Lansing, MI
January 7, 2027; 8:00 p.m., BTN		at Northwestern						Welsh–Ryan Arena; Evanston, IL
January 10, 2027; 4:30 p.m., BTN		at Nebraska						Pinnacle Bank Arena; Lincoln, NE
January 13, 2027; 6:30 p.m., B1G+		Oregon						Breslin Center; East Lansing, MI
January 17, 2027; 3:00 p.m., B1G+		at Illinois						State Farm Center; Champaign, IL
January 20, 2027; 6:30 p.m., B1G+		Washington						Breslin Center; East Lansing, MI
January 24, 2027; 2:00 p.m., B1G+		Indiana						Breslin Center; East Lansing, MI
January 28, 2027; 7:00 p.m., B1G+		at Rutgers						Jersey Mike's Arena; Piscataway, NJ
February 1, 2027; 7:00 p.m., BTN		at Maryland						Xfinity Center; College Park, MD
February 7, 2027; 1:00 p.m., B1G+		at Ohio State						Value City Arena; Columbus, OH
February 11, 2027; 6:00 p.m., BTN		Purdue						Breslin Center; East Lansing, MI
February 14, 2027; 2:00 p.m., B1G+		Minnesota						Breslin Center; East Lansing, MI
February 18, 2027; 10:00 p.m., Peacock/NBCSN		at USC						Galen Center; Los Angeles, CA
February 21, 2027; 3:00 p.m., BTN		at UCLA						Pauley Pavilion; Los Angeles, CA
February 25, 2027; 6:00 p.m., B1G+		Wisconsin						Breslin Center; East Lansing, MI
February 28, 2027; 1:00 p.m., Peacock/NBCSN		Michigan; Rivalry						Breslin Center; East Lansing, MI
*Non-conference game. ^{#}Rankings from AP Poll. (#) Tournament seedings in parentheses. All times are in Easrern.

== Rankings ==
Ranking movements Legend: RV = Received votes
	Week																				
Poll	Pre	1	2	3	4	5	6	7	8	9	10	11	12	13	14	15	16	17	18	19	Final
AP	RV																				
Coaches	RV																				
