= Colegio Sagrado Corazón =

Colegio Sagrado Corazón (Sacred Heart School) may refer to:

- Colegio Sagrado Corazón (Chile), a high school in Rancagua, Cachapoal Province, Chile
- Colegio Sagrado Corazón de Jesús, a high school in Quinta de Tilcoco, Cachapoal Province, Chile
- Maristas Colegio Sagrado Corazón Valencia, a school in Valencia, Spain
