= 2026–27 Michigan Wolverines women's basketball team =

Intercollegiate basketball season

2026–27 Michigan Wolverines women's basketball
- Conference: Big Ten Conference

Ranking
- Coaches: No. 2
- AP: No. 2
- Record: 5–0 (0–0 Big Ten)
- Head coach: Kim Barnes Arico (15th season)
- Assistant coaches: Melanie Moore; Justine Raterman; Jordann Reese; Sean Bair; Danielle Rauch
- Home arena: Crisler Center

2026–27 Big Ten women's basketball standings
| | Conf. | | | | Overall |
| Team | W | | L | PCT | W | | L | PCT |
|---|---|---|---|---|---|---|---|---|
| Indiana | 0 | – | 0 | – | 6 | – | 0 | 1.000 |
| Rutgers | 0 | – | 0 | – | 6 | – | 0 | 1.000 |
| No. 2 Michigan | 0 | – | 0 | – | 5 | – | 0 | 1.000 |
| Michigan State | 0 | – | 0 | – | 5 | – | 0 | 1.000 |
| No. 17 Minnesota | 0 | – | 0 | – | 5 | – | 0 | 1.000 |
| No. 23 Nebraska | 0 | – | 0 | – | 5 | – | 0 | 1.000 |
| No. 10 UCLA | 0 | – | 0 | – | 5 | – | 0 | 1.000 |
| No. 16 Washington | 0 | – | 0 | – | 5 | – | 0 | 1.000 |
| No. 21 Illinois | 0 | – | 0 | – | 4 | – | 0 | 1.000 |
| Oregon | 0 | – | 0 | – | 6 | – | 1 | .857 |
| No. 8 Iowa | 0 | – | 0 | – | 5 | – | 1 | .833 |
| No. 19т Ohio State | 0 | – | 0 | – | 5 | – | 1 | .833 |
| Wisconsin | 0 | – | 0 | – | 5 | – | 1 | .833 |
| Purdue | 0 | – | 0 | – | 4 | – | 1 | .800 |
| No. 4 USC | 0 | – | 0 | – | 4 | – | 1 | .800 |
| No. 18 Maryland | 0 | – | 0 | – | 3 | – | 1 | .750 |
| Northwestern | 0 | – | 0 | – | 2 | – | 4 | .333 |
| Penn State | 0 | – | 0 | – | 1 | – | 4 | .200 |
† 2027 Big Ten tournament winner As of November 21, 2026; Rankings from AP poll

The 2026–27 Michigan Wolverines women's basketball team currently represents the University of Michigan during the 2026–27 NCAA Division I women's basketball season as a member of the Big Ten Conference. The Wolverines are led by head coach Kim Barnes Arico in her fifteenth year, and play their home games at Crisler Center in Ann Arbor, Michigan.

== Previous season ==
The Wolverines finished the 2025–26 season with a 27–8 record, including 15–3 in Big Ten play, to finish in second place in the conference. As the No. 2 seed in the Big Ten tournament, they earned a bye to the quarterfinals where they defeated No. 11 Oregon. They were unable to advance to the championship game, as they fell 44–59 to No. 3 Iowa.

Following their elimination, the Wolverines earned an at-large bid to the NCAA tournament, where they were ranked as the No. 2 seed in the Fort Worth #3 Regional. They routed No. 15 Holy Cross and No. 7 NC State to advance to the Sweet Sixteen. Michigan then defeated No. 3 Louisville 71–52 to advance to their first Elite Eight since 2022, and their second in program history. They also tied their program record 28 wins with their victory over the Cardinals. They could not advance to the Final Four, as they lost to top-seeded Texas 41–77 to end their season.

== Offseason ==
=== Departures ===
Michigan departures
| Name | Number | Pos. | Height | Year | Hometown | Reason for departure |
|---|---|---|---|---|---|---|
| Brooke Quarles Daniels | 5 | Guard | 5'7" | Senior | Macomb, MI | Graduated, transferred to South Carolina (Note: As part of an ongoing lawsuit challenging the new NCAA age-based eligibility model which excluded the class of 2022, Quarles Daniels was granted an additional year of eligibility from a temporary restraining order in a California case.) |
| Alyssa Crockett | 20 | Forward | 6'2" | Senior | Westfield, IN | Graduated |
| Ally VanTimmeren | 21 | Forward | 6'2" | Graduate Student | Allendale, MI | Graduated |
| McKenzie Mathurin | 25 | Guard | 5'10" | Freshman | Broken Arrow, OK | Transferred to Missouri |

=== Incoming transfers ===
Michigan incoming transfers
| Name | Number | Pos. | Height | Year | Hometown | Previous school |
|---|---|---|---|---|---|---|
| Courtney Ogden | 40 | Guard | 6'1" | Graduate Student | Atlanta, GA | Stanford |

=== Recruiting class ===
College recruiting
| Name | Hometown | School | Height | Weight | Commit date |
|---|---|---|---|---|---|
| Fope Ayo; P | Methuen, MA | Austin Prep | 6 ft 3 in (1.91 m) | N/A | |
| Fope Ayo; P | Recruit ratings: Rivals: 247Sports: ESPN: (94) | | | | |
| Devin Cosgriff; G | Livermore, CA | Archbishop Mitty High School | 6 ft 3 in (1.91 m) | N/A | |
| Devin Cosgriff; G | Recruit ratings: Rivals: 247Sports: ESPN: (93) | | | | |
Overall recruit ranking: ESPN: 23
Note: In many cases, Scout, Rivals, 247Sports, On3, and ESPN may conflict in their listings of height and weight.; In these cases, the average was taken. ESPN grades are on a 100-point scale.; Sources: "2026 Player Commits". ESPN. Archived from the original on September 10, 2026.

== Roster ==
2026–27 Michigan Wolverines women's basketball team
Players
Coaches

| Pos. | # | Name | Height | Year | Previous school | Hometown |
|---|---|---|---|---|---|---|
| G | 1 | Olivia Olson | 6 ft 1 in (1.85 m) | Jr | Benilde-St. Margaret's | New Hope, MN |
| G | 2 | Macy Brown | 6 ft 0 in (1.83 m) | Sr | East Grand Rapids HS | East Grand Rapids, MI |
| G | 3 | Mila Holloway (injured) | 5 ft 10 in (1.78 m) | Jr | Legacy Early College | Charlotte, NC |
| G | 4 | Dallas Loughridge | 5 ft 6 in (1.68 m) | Sr | St Paul's Anglican Grammar | Victoria, Australia |
| F | 7 | Jessica Fields | 6 ft 1 in (1.85 m) | So | Mount Paran Christian | Kennesaw, GA |
| G | 12 | Syla Swords | 6 ft 0 in (1.83 m) | Jr | Long Island Lutheran HS | Sudbury, ON |
| F | 15 | Ashley Sofilkanich | 6 ft 3 in (1.91 m) | Jr | Bucknell | South Amboy, NJ |
| F | 22 | Kendall Dudley | 6 ft 2 in (1.88 m) | Jr | UCLA | Manassas Park, VA |
| F | 23 | Ciara Byars | 6 ft 2 in (1.88 m) | So | George Rogers Clark HS | Paris, KY |
| G | 24 | Devin Cosgriff | 5 ft 10 in (1.78 m) | Fr | Archbishop Mitty HS | Livermore, CA |
| F | 32 | Fope Ayo | 6 ft 5 in (1.96 m) | Fr | Austin Prep | Methuen, MA |
| G/F | 33 | Te'Yala Delfosse | 6 ft 3 in (1.91 m) | Jr | Ewing HS | Ewing, NJ |
| F | 34 | Aaiyanna Dunbar | 6 ft 2 in (1.88 m) | Jr | Blackman HS | Murfreesboro, TN |
| G | 40 | Courtney Ogden | 6 ft 1 in (1.85 m) | GS | Stanford | Atlanta, GA |

Head coach

- Kim Barnes Arico (alum: Montclair State)

Assistant coach(es)

- Melanie Moore (Siena)
- Justine Raterman (Dayton)
- Jordann Reese (Drake)
- Sean Bair (Dickinson)
- Danielle Rauch (Michigan)

Legend

- (C) Team captain
- (S) Suspended
- (I) Ineligible
- (W) Walk-on
- Injured
- Current redshirt

Roster
Last update: September 10, 2026

== Schedule and results ==
| Date time, TV | Rank^{#} | Opponent^{#} | Result | Record | High points | High rebounds | High assists | Site (attendance) city, state |
Exhibition
| October 29, 2026*; 7:00 p.m., B1G+ | No. 5 | Rochester Christian | W 115–24 | – | 22 – Delfosse | 8 – Olson | 5 – Tied | Crisler Center (3,805); Ann Arbor, MI |
Regular season
| November 5, 2026*; 6:30 p.m., FS1 | No. 5 | No. 2 UConn | W 77–66 | 1–0 | 22 – Delfosse | 9 – Delfosse | 9 – Loughridge | Crisler Center (9,575); Ann Arbor, MI |
| November 8, 2026*; 2:00 p.m., B1G+ | No. 5 | Wright State | W 109–52 | 2–0 | 19 – Olson | 6 – Fields | 7 – Olson | Crisler Center (3,608); Ann Arbor, MI |
| November 12, 2026*; 7:00 p.m., ESPN+ | No. 2 | at Columbia | W 81–58 | 3–0 | 17 – Swords | 10 – Dudley | 7 – Loughridge | Levien Gymnasium (2,506); New York, NY |
| November 16, 2026*; 8:00 p.m., CBSSN | No. 2 | at Central Michigan | W 101–30 | 4–0 | 16 – Olson | 9 – Delfosse | 10 – Loughridge | McGuirk Arena (2,929); Mount Pleasant, MI |
| November 18, 2026*; 7:00 p.m., B1G+ | No. 2 | Niagara | W 112–31 | 5–0 | 22 – Olson | 7 – Swords | 7 – Loughridge | Crisler Center (3,035); Ann Arbor, MI |
| November 23, 2026*; 4:00 p.m., BDG Live | | vs. Miami (FL); Baha Mar Pink Flamingo Championship | | | | | | Baha Mar Convention Center; Nassau, Bahamas |
| November 25, 2026*; 1:30 p.m., BDG Live | | vs. Toledo; Baha Mar Pink Flamingo Championship | | | | | | Baha Mar Convention Center; Nassau, Bahamas |
| November 30, 2026*; 7:00 p.m., B1G+ | | Southern Indiana | | | | | | Crisler Center; Ann Arbor, MI |
| December 5, 2026*; 2:00 p.m., FOX | | vs. Oklahoma; Women's Champions Classic | | | | | | Barclays Center; Brooklyn, NY |
| December 7, 2026*; 7:00 p.m., B1G+ | | Kent State | | | | | | Crisler Center; Ann Arbor, MI |
| December 11, 2026; 7:00 p.m., Peacock | | at Maryland | | | | | | Xfinity Center; College Park, MD |
| December 21, 2026*; 12:00 p.m., B1G+ | | Detroit Mercy | | | | | | Crisler Center; Ann Arbor, MI |
| December 29, 2026; 6:00 p.m., FS1 | | Michigan State; Rivalry | | | | | | Crisler Center; Ann Arbor, MI |
| January 1, 2027; 12:00 p.m., BTN | | at Purdue | | | | | | Mackey Arena; West Lafayette, IN |
| January 7, 2027; 7:00 p.m., Peacock | | Ohio State; Rivalry | | | | | | Crisler Center; Ann Arbor, MI |
| January 10, 2027; 12:00 p.m., Peacock | | Oregon | | | | | | Crisler Center; Ann Arbor, MI |
| January 13, 2027; 7:00 p.m., FS1 | | at Nebraska | | | | | | Pinnacle Bank Arena; Lincoln, NE |
| January 17, 2027; 4:00 p.m., BTN | | Rutgers | | | | | | Crisler Center; Ann Arbor, MI |
| January 20, 2027; 8:00 p.m., Peacock | | at Illinois | | | | | | State Farm Center; Champaign, IL |
| January 23, 2027; 5:00 p.m., Peacock | | Washington | | | | | | Crisler Center; Ann Arbor, MI |
| January 27, 2027; 7:00 p.m., B1G+ | | Penn State | | | | | | Crisler Center; Ann Arbor, MI |
| January 30, 2027; 5:30 p.m., FOX | | at USC | | | | | | Galen Center; Los Angeles, CA |
| February 2, 2027; 10:00 p.m., FS1 | | at UCLA | | | | | | Pauley Pavilion; Los Angeles, CA |
| February 7, 2027; 12:00 p.m., FOX | | Iowa | | | | | | Crisler Center; Ann Arbor, MI |
| February 12, 2027; 7:00 p.m., B1G+ | | Northwestern | | | | | | Crisler Center; Ann Arbor, MI |
| February 17, 2027; TBA, B1G+ | | at Minnesota | | | | | | The Barn; Minneapolis, MN |
| February 20, 2027; 1:00 p.m., BTN | | at Wisconsin | | | | | | Kohl Center; Madison, WI |
| February 24, 2027; 6:30 p.m., Peacock | | Indiana | | | | | | Crisler Center; Ann Arbor, MI |
| February 28, 2027; 1:00 p.m., Peacock | | at Michigan State; Rivalry | | | | | | Breslin Center; East Lansing, MI |
*Non-conference game. ^{#}Rankings from AP poll. (#) Tournament seedings in parentheses. All times are in Eastern Time. Source:

== Awards and honors ==
Weekly Awards
| Player | Award | Date Awarded | Ref. |
|---|---|---|---|
| Te'Yala Delfosse | Big Ten Player of the Week | November 9, 2026 | |

== Rankings ==
Ranking movements Legend: ██ Increase in ranking ██ Decrease in ranking
| | Week | | | | | | | | | | | | | | | | | | | | |
| Poll | Pre | 1 | 2 | 3 | 4 | 5 | 6 | 7 | 8 | 9 | 10 | 11 | 12 | 13 | 14 | 15 | 16 | 17 | 18 | 19 | Final |
|---|---|---|---|---|---|---|---|---|---|---|---|---|---|---|---|---|---|---|---|---|---|
| AP | 5 | 2 | 2 | | | | | | | | | | | | | | | | | | |
| Coaches | 5 | 2 | 2 | | | | | | | | | | | | | | | | | | |
