= 2026–27 Purdue Boilermakers women's basketball team =

American college basketball season

2026–27 Purdue Boilermakers women's basketball
- Conference: Big Ten Conference
- Record: 4–2 (0–0 Big Ten)
- Head coach: Katie Gearlds (6th season)
- Associate head coach: April Phillips
- Assistant coaches: Kelly Komara; Emily Ben-Jumbo; Bojan Jankovic
- Home arena: Mackey Arena

2026–27 Big Ten women's basketball standings
	Conf.				Overall
Team	W		L	PCT	W		L	PCT
Rutgers	0	–	0	–	7	–	0	1.000
Indiana	0	–	0	–	6	–	0	1.000
No. 2 Michigan	0	–	0	–	5	–	0	1.000
Michigan State	0	–	0	–	5	–	0	1.000
No. 17 Minnesota	0	–	0	–	5	–	0	1.000
No. 23 Nebraska	0	–	0	–	5	–	0	1.000
No. 10 UCLA	0	–	0	–	5	–	0	1.000
No. 16 Washington	0	–	0	–	5	–	0	1.000
No. 21 Illinois	0	–	0	–	4	–	0	1.000
Oregon	0	–	0	–	6	–	1	.857
No. 8 Iowa	0	–	0	–	5	–	1	.833
No. 19т Ohio State	0	–	0	–	5	–	1	.833
Wisconsin	0	–	0	–	5	–	1	.833
No. 18 Maryland	0	–	0	–	4	–	1	.800
No. 4 USC	0	–	0	–	4	–	1	.800
Purdue	0	–	0	–	4	–	2	.667
Northwestern	0	–	0	–	3	–	4	.429
Penn State	0	–	0	–	1	–	4	.200
† 2027 Big Ten tournament winner As of November 22, 2026; Rankings from AP poll

The 2026–27 Purdue Boilermakers women's basketball team will represent Purdue University during the 2026–27 NCAA Division I women's basketball season. The Boilermakers will be led by sixth-year head coach Katie Gearlds, and will play their home games at Mackey Arena in West Lafayette, Indiana as a member of the Big Ten Conference.

== Previous season ==
The Boilermakers finished the 2025–26 season 13–17 overall and 5–13 in Big Ten play, to finish in a tie for fourteenth in the conference with Wisconsin. As the No. 14 seed in the Big Ten tournament, they lost in the first round to No. 11 Oregon to end their season.

== Offseason ==
=== Departures ===
Purdue departures
Name	Num	Pos.	Height	Year	Hometown	Reason for departure
Nya Smith	3	Guard	5'9	Sophomore	Roswell, GA	Transferred to Georgia
Taylor Feldman	5	Guard	5'8"	Senior	Tustin, CA	Graduated, transferred to High Point
Hila Karsh	8	Guard	5'8"	Freshman	Rishon LeZion, Israel	Transferred to Xavier
Kendall Puryear	22	Forward	6'3"	Sophomore	Lee's Summit, MO	Transferred to South Florida
Kiki Smith	23	Guard	5'7"	Junior	Topeka, KS	Transferred to Texas Tech
Carley Barrett	24	Guard	5'7"	Freshman	Lafayette, IN	Walk-on
Madison Layden-Zay	33	Guard	6'1"	Fifth year	Kokomo, IN	Exhausted eligibility
Lana McCarthy	35	Forward	6'4"	Sophomore	Bedford, NH	Transferred to Fairfield
Tara Daye	44	Guard	5'10"	(redshirt) Junior	Newark, NJ	Transferred to Rutgers

=== Incoming transfers ===
Purdue incoming transfers
Name	Num	Pos.	Height	Year	Hometown	Previous school
Kyndall Hunter	3	Guard	5'7"	6th Year	Houston, TX	Houston
Hannah Wickstrom	7	Guard	5'10"	Junior	Melbourne, Australia	UC Riverside
Jelena Bulajić	8	Guard	5'10"	Sophomore	Bijela, Montenegro	South Florida
Anjela Minja	10	Center	6'5"	Junior	Kilimanjaro, Tanzania	Gulf Coast State (NJCAA)
Aysia Proctor	12	Guard	5'8"	Senior	Schertz, TX	North Texas
Averi Aaron	25	Forward	6'1"	Junior	Boerne, TX	Louisiana Tech

=== Recruiting class ===
There was no recruiting class for 2026.

== Roster ==
2026–27 Purdue Boilermakers women's basketball team
Players
Coaches

Pos.	#	Name	Height	Year	Previous school	Hometown
G	2	Taylor Henderson	5 ft 11 in (1.8 m)	RS Sr	Winston Salem Christian School; UNC Wilmington	Charlotte, NC
G	3	Kyndall Hunter (6th)	5 ft 7 in (1.7 m)	RS Sr	Cypress Creek High School; Houston	Houston, TX
G	4	Keona Douwstra	5 ft 9 in (1.75 m)	Fr		Amsterdam, Netherlands
G	5	Zoja Štirn (injured)	5 ft 10 in (1.78 m)	Fr		Kranj, Slovenia
F	6	Katka Šedivá	6 ft 1 in (1.85 m)	Fr		Košice, Slovakia
G	7	Hannah Wickstrom	5 ft 10 in (1.78 m)	Jr	Kilbreda College; UC Riverside	Melbourne, Australia
G	8	Jelena Bulajić	5 ft 10 in (1.78 m)	So	South Florida	Bijela, Montenegro
C	10	Amjela Minja	6 ft 5 in (1.96 m)	Jr	Gulf Coast State College	Kilimanjaro, Tanzania
G	11	McKenna Layden	6 ft 2 in (1.88 m)	Sr	Northwestern High School	Kokomo, IN
G	12	Aysia Proctor	5 ft 8 in (1.73 m)	Sr	Samuel Clemens High School; North Texas	Schertz, TX
F	13	Saige Stahl	6 ft 1 in (1.85 m)	Sr	Columbus East High School; Indiana State	Seymour, IN
G	20	Maya Zilbershlag	5 ft 11 in (1.8 m)	Fr		Kfar Saba, Israel
F	25	Averi Aaron	6 ft 1 in (1.85 m)	Jr	Boerne High School; Lousiana Tech	Boerne, TX
F	55	Avery Gordon	6 ft 7 in (2.01 m)	So	Brownsburg High School	Brownsburg, IN

Head coach

- Katie Gearlds (Purdue)

Assistant coach(es)

- April Phillips (Xavier)
- Kelly Komara (Purdue)
- Emily Ben-Jumbo (Loyola Marymount)
- Bojan Jankovic (Ozarks)

Legend

- (C) Team captain
- (S) Suspended
- (I) Ineligible
- (W) Walk-on
- (6Y) Sixth-year senior
- Injured
- Current redshirt

Roster
Last update: July 30, 2026

== Schedule and results ==
Date time, TV	Rank^{#}	Opponent^{#}	Result	Record	High points	High rebounds	High assists	Site (attendance) city, state
Exhibition
October 24, 2026*; 2:00 p.m., B1G+		UIC	W 55–52		–	–	–	Mackey Arena; West Lafayette, IN
Regular season
November 2, 2026*; 7:00 p.m., B1G+		IU Indy	W 81–73	1–0	21 – Tied	8 – Tied	6 – Bulajic	Mackey Arena (3,010); West Lafayette, IN
November 5, 2026*; 7:00 p.m., B1G+		Eastern Michigan	W 83–73	2–0	21 – Wickstrom	9 – Tied	4 – Tied	Mackey Arena (4,015); West Lafayette, IN
November 10, 2026*; 7:00 p.m., B1G+		Southeast Missouri State	W 73–50	3–0	19 – Wickstrom	8 – Aaron	5 – Hunter	Mackey Arena (3,010); West Lafayette, IN
November 15, 2026*; 12:00 p.m., B1G+		Samford	W 70–61	4–0	20 – Wickstrom	10 – Wickstrom	6 – Hunter	Mackey Arena (4,408); West Lafayette, IN
November 19, 2026*; 11:00 a.m., ESPNU		vs. Florida State; WBCA Showcase	L 50–63	4–1	17 – Hunter	6 – Gordon	4 – Bulajic	State Farm Field House; Orlando, FL
November 21, 2026*; 2:30 p.m., ESPN+		vs. Texas Tech; WBCA Showcase	L 57–58	4–2	16 – Wickstrom	5 – Tied	3 – Henderson	State Farm Field House (N/A); Orlando, FL
November 25, 2026*; 12:00 p.m., B1G+		Murray State						Mackey Arena; West Lafayette, IN
November 29, 2026*; 12:00 p.m., B1G+		UT Martin						Mackey Arena; West Lafayette, IN
December 6, 2026; 2:00 p.m., BTN		Minnesota						Mackey Arena; West Lafayette, IN
December 10, 2026*; 11:00 a.m., B1G+		Central Michigan						Mackey Arena; West Lafayette, IN
December 13, 2026*; 12:00 p.m., B1G+		Eastern Illinois						Mackey Arena; West Lafayette, IN
December 19, 2026*; 1:00 p.m., ESPN+		at Dayton						UD Arena; Dayton, OH
December 22, 2026*; 12:00 p.m., B1G+		Western Michigan						Mackey Arena; West Lafayette, IN
December 29, 2026; 6:00 p.m., B1G+		at Penn State						Rec Hall; State College, PA
January 1, 2027; 12:00 p.m., BTN		Michigan						Mackey Arena; West Lafayette, IN
January 5, 2027; 7:00 p.m., B1G+		UCLA						Mackey Arena; West Lafayette, IN
January 10, 2027; 2:30 p.m., BTN		at Illinois						State Farm Center; Champaign, IL
January 14, 2027; 7:00 p.m., BTN		Wisconsin						Mackey Arena; West Lafayette, IN
January 17, 2027; 5:00 p.m., B1G+		at Washington						Alaska Airlines Center; Seattle, WA
January 20, 2027; 10:00 p.m., B1G+		at Oregon						Matthew Knight Arena; Eugene, OR
January 24, 2027; 12:00 p.m., B1G+		USC						Mackey Arena; West Lafayette, IN
January 31, 2027; 2:00 p.m., B1G+		at Indiana; Rivalry/Indiana National Guard Governor's Cup						Simon Skjodt Assembly Hall; Bloomington, IN
February 4, 2027; 6:00 p.m., BTN		Maryland						Mackey Arena; West Lafayette, IN
February 7, 2027; 12:00 p.m., B1G+		Nebraska						Mackey Arena; West Lafayette, IN
February 11, 2027; 6:00 p.m., BTN		at Michigan State						Breslin Center; East Lansing, MI
February 14, 2027; 2:00 p.m., B1G+		at Rutgers						Jersey Mike's Arena; Piscataway, NJ
February 17, 2027; 7:00 p.m., B1G+		Indiana; Rivalry/Indiana National Guard Governor's Cup						Mackey Arena; West Lafayette, IN
February 21, 2027; 2:00 p.m., B1G+		at Iowa						Carver–Hawkeye Arena; Iowa City, IA
February 24, 2027; 7:00 p.m., B1G+		at Ohio State						Schottenstein Center; Columbus, OH
February 28, 2027; 12:00 p.m., B1G+		Northwestern						Mackey Arena; West Lafayette, IN
*Non-conference game. ^{#}Rankings from AP Poll. (#) Tournament seedings in parentheses. All times are in Eastern.
