= 2026–27 Ohio State Buckeyes women's basketball team =

American college basketball season

2026–27 Ohio State Buckeyes women's basketball
- Conference: Big Ten Conference

Ranking
- Coaches: No. 19
- AP: No. 19т
- Record: 5–2 (0–0 Big Ten)
- Head coach: Kevin McGuff (14th season)
- Assistant coaches: Jalen Powell; Ryan Murray; Reid Guzdanski; Katie Smith; Todd Schaefer
- Home arena: Schottenstein Center

2026–27 Big Ten women's basketball standings
	Conf.				Overall
Team	W		L	PCT	W		L	PCT
Rutgers	0	–	0	–	7	–	0	1.000
Indiana	0	–	0	–	6	–	0	1.000
No. 2 Michigan	0	–	0	–	5	–	0	1.000
Michigan State	0	–	0	–	5	–	0	1.000
No. 17 Minnesota	0	–	0	–	5	–	0	1.000
No. 23 Nebraska	0	–	0	–	5	–	0	1.000
No. 10 UCLA	0	–	0	–	5	–	0	1.000
No. 16 Washington	0	–	0	–	5	–	0	1.000
No. 21 Illinois	0	–	0	–	4	–	0	1.000
Oregon	0	–	0	–	6	–	1	.857
No. 8 Iowa	0	–	0	–	5	–	1	.833
No. 19т Ohio State	0	–	0	–	5	–	1	.833
Wisconsin	0	–	0	–	5	–	1	.833
No. 18 Maryland	0	–	0	–	4	–	1	.800
No. 4 USC	0	–	0	–	4	–	1	.800
Purdue	0	–	0	–	4	–	2	.667
Northwestern	0	–	0	–	3	–	4	.429
Penn State	0	–	0	–	1	–	4	.200
† 2027 Big Ten tournament winner As of November 22, 2026; Rankings from AP poll

The 2026–27 Ohio State Buckeyes women's basketball team is currently representing The Ohio State University in the 2026–27 NCAA Division I women's basketball season. The Buckeyes are being led by their fourteenth-year head coach Kevin McGuff, play their games at the Schottenstein Center in Columbus, Ohio, and compete as a member of the Big Ten Conference.

== Previous season ==
The Buckeyes finished up the 2025–26 season 27–8 overall and 13–5 in Big Ten play, to finish fourth in the conference. As the No. 5 seed in the Big Ten tournament, they defeated No. 13 Indiana and No. 4 Minnesota in the second round and quarterfinals respectively, before falling to top-seeded, eventual tournament winners and NCAA tournament champions, No. 1 UCLA in the semifinals.

Following their elimination in the conference tournament, the Buckeyes earned an at-large bid to the NCAA tournament, where they were seeded No. 3 in the Fort Worth #1 Regional. They defeated No. 14 Howard in the first round, before falling to No. 6 Notre Dame in the second round to end their season.

== Offseason ==
=== Departures ===
Ohio State departures
Name	Num	Pos.	Height	Year	Hometown	Reason for departure
Chance Gray	2	Guard	5'9"	Senior	Cincinnati, OH	Graduated; drafted 24th overall by the Los Angeles Sparks in the 2026 WNBA draft
T'yana Todd	4	Guard	6'0"	Senior	Vaughan, ON	Graduated, transferred to Grand Canyon (Note: As part of an ongoing lawsuit challenging the new NCAA age-based eligibility model which excluded the class of 2022, Todd was granted an additional year of eligibility from a temporary restraining order filed in North Carolina.)
Dasha Biriuk	7	Guard	6'1"	Freshman	Berdianski, Ukraine	Transferred to Grand Canyon

=== Incoming transfers ===
There were no incoming transfers for the 2026–27 season.

=== Recruiting class ===
College recruiting
Name	Hometown	School	Height	Weight	Commit date
Sydney Mobley (Note: Reclassified from the class of 2027.); F	Sunbury, OH	Big Walnut High School	6 ft 2 in (1.88 m)	N/A	
Sydney Mobley; F	Recruit ratings: Rivals: 247Sports: ESPN: (94)				
Atlee Vanesko; G	Ocean City, NJ	Westtown School	5 ft 10 in (1.78 m)	N/A	
Atlee Vanesko; G	Recruit ratings: Rivals: 247Sports: ESPN: (93)				
Overall recruit ranking:
Note: In many cases, Scout, Rivals, 247Sports, On3, and ESPN may conflict in their listings of height and weight.; In these cases, the average was taken. ESPN grades are on a 100-point scale.; Sources: "2026 Player Commits". ESPN. Archived from the original on July 29, 2026.

== Roster ==
2026–27 Ohio State Buckeyes women's basketball team
Players
Coaches

Pos.	#	Name	Height	Year	Previous school	Hometown
F	0	Sydney Mobley	6 ft 2 in (1.88 m)	Fr	Big Walnut High School	Sunbury, OH
G/F	1	Kylee Kitts	6 ft 4 in (1.93 m)	RS So	Hagerty High School; Florida	Oviedo, FL
G	3	Kennedy Cambridge	5 ft 8 in (1.73 m)	RS Sr	The Ensworth School; Kentucky	Nashville, TN
G	4	Atlee Vanesko	6 ft 0 in (1.83 m)	Fr	Westtown School	Ocean City, NJ
G	5	Ava Watson	5 ft 8 in (1.73 m)	Jr	Buford High School	Buford, GA
G	8	Bryn Martin	6 ft 1 in (1.85 m)	So	Springboro High School	Springboro, OH
C	12	Elsa Lemmilä	6 ft 6 in (1.98 m)	Jr	Tapiolan Honka Club	Espoo, Finland
F	14	Ella Hobbs	6 ft 4 in (1.93 m)	RS So	Jay M. Robinson High School	Concord, NC
F	15	Seini Henry	6 ft 0 in (1.83 m)	RS So	Purcell Marian High School	Charlotte, NC
G	22	Jaloni Cambridge	5 ft 7 in (1.7 m)	Jr	Montverde Academy	Nashville, TN
F	29	Adriana Díaz	6 ft 1 in (1.85 m)	Fr	Movistar Estudiantes Madrid	Madrid, Spain

Head coach

- Kevin McGuff (Saint Joseph's (IN))

Assistant coach(es)

- Jalen Powell (Mississippi)
- Ryan Murray (Ohio State)
- Reid Guzdanski (Ohio State)
- Katie Smith (Ohio State)
- Todd Schaefer (Thomas More)

Legend

- (C) Team captain
- (S) Suspended
- (I) Ineligible
- (W) Walk-on
- Injured
- Current redshirt

Roster
Last update: July 29, 2026

== Schedule and results ==
Date time, TV	Rank^{#}	Opponent^{#}	Result	Record	High points	High rebounds	High assists	Site (attendance) city, state
Regular season
November 2, 2026*; 6:30 p.m., B1G+	No. 18	UIC	W 81–34	1–0	22 – J. Cambridge	11 – Lemmilä	4 – Watson	Schottenstein Center (3,820); Columbus, OH
November 5, 2026*; 6:30 p.m., B1G+	No. 18	Central Michigan	W 103–36	2–0	23 – J. Cambridge	10 – Tied	8 – J. Cambridge	Schottenstein Center (3,893); Columbus, OH
November 8, 2026*; 1:00 p.m., B1G+	No. 18	Mercyhurst	W 91–57	3–0	19 – Lemmilä	12 – Lemmilä	7 – J. Cambridge	Schottenstein Center (4,726); Columbus, OH
November 12, 2026*; 6:30 p.m., FS1	No. 17	No. 4 UConn	L 55–87	3–1	21 – J. Cambridge	7 – K. Cambridge	6 – J. Cambridge	Schottenstein Center (8,842); Columbus, OH
November 15, 2026*; 1:00 p.m., B1G+	No. 17	Fairleigh Dickinson	W 93–49	4–1	18 – Tied	11 – Kitts	7 – J. Cambridge	Schottenstein Center (4,029); Columbus, OH
November 18, 2026*; 7:00 p.m., FS1	No. 19т	No. 19т Ole Miss	W 60–57	5–1	27 – J. Cambridge	15 – Kitts	3 – Tied	Schottenstein Center (4,812); Columbus, OH
November 22, 2026*; 1:00 p.m., ESPN	No. 19т	vs. No. 6 Texas; Wild Horse Sports Lone Star Series	L 61–75	5–2	27 – J. Cambridge	–	–	Ariat Arena; Fort Worth, TX
November 28, 2026*; 12:00 p.m.		vs. VCU; 4 Tha Culture Holiday Hoops						Henrico Sports & Events Center; Richmond, VA
December 2, 2026*; 6:30 p.m., B1G+		Akron						Schottenstein Center; Columbus, OH
December 5, 2026; 12:00 p.m., BTN		at Rutgers						Jersey Mike's Arena; Piscataway, NJ
December 9, 2026*; 6:30 p.m., B1G+		Grand Valley State						Schottenstein Center; Columbus, OH
December 13, 2026*; 1:00 p.m., B1G+		Canisius						Schottenstein Center; Columbus, OH
December 16, 2026*; 6:30 p.m., B1G+		Miami (OH)						Schottenstein Center; Columbus, OH
December 20, 2026*; 8:30 p.m., BTN		vs. Stanford; Bay Area Women’s Classic						Chase Center; San Francisco, CA
December 29, 2026; 6:30 p.m., B1G+		Oregon						Schottenstein Center; Columbus, OH
January 2, 2027; 4:00 p.m., BTN		Maryland						Schottenstein Center; Columbus, OH
January 7, 2027; 7:00 p.m., Peacock/NBCSN		at Michigan; Rivalry						Crisler Center; Ann Arbor, MI
January 10, 2027; 3:00 p.m., B1G+		at Wisconsin						Kohl Center; Madison, WI
January 13, 2027; 6:30 p.m., B1G+		Illinois						Schottenstein Center; Columbus, OH
January 17, 2027; 12:30 p.m./3:30 p.m., FOX		at Nebraska						Pinnacle Bank Arena; Lincoln, NE
January 21, 2027; 7:00 p.m., FS1		at Maryland						Xfinity Center; College Park, MD
January 24, 2027; 2:00 p.m., BTN		Minnesota						Schottenstein Center; Columbus, OH
January 28, 2027; 6:30 p.m., B1G+		Northwestern						Schottenstein Center; Columbus, OH
January 31, 2027; 1:00 p.m., B1G+		at Penn State						Rec Hall; State College, PA
February 3, 2027; 7:00 p.m., B1G+		at Indiana						Simon Skjodt Assembly Hall; Bloomington, IN
February 7, 2027; 1:00 p.m., B1G+		Michigan State						Schottenstein Center; Columbus, OH
February 10, 2027; 6:30 p.m., B1G+		Washington						Schottenstein Center; Columbus, OH
February 18, 2027; 10:30 p.m., BTN		at UCLA						Pauley Pavilion; Los Angeles, CA
February 21, 2027; 4:00 p.m., NBC		at USC						Galen Center; Los Angeles, CA
February 24, 2027; 7:00 p.m., B1G+		Purdue						Schottenstein Center; Columbus, OH
February 28, 2027; 12:00 p.m., FOX		Iowa						Schottenstein Center; Columbus, OH
*Non-conference game. ^{#}Rankings from AP Poll. (#) Tournament seedings in parentheses. All times are in Eastern.

== Rankings ==
Ranking movements Legend: ██ Increase in ranking ██ Decrease in ranking т = Tied with team above or below
	Week																				
Poll	Pre	1	2	3	4	5	6	7	8	9	10	11	12	13	14	15	16	17	18	19	Final
AP	18	17	19т																		
Coaches	20	19	19																		

== See also ==
2026-27 Ohio State Buckeyes men's basketball team
