= 2026–27 Illinois Fighting Illini women's basketball team =

Intercollegiate basketball season

2026–27 Illinois Fighting Illini women's basketball
- Conference: Big Ten Conference

Ranking
- Coaches: No. 21
- AP: No. 21
- Record: 4–0 (0–0 Big Ten)
- Head coach: Shauna Green (5th season)
- Associate head coach: Calamity McEntire
- Assistant coaches: Britney Anderson; DeAntoine Beasley; Emily Durr; Simon Harris
- Home arena: State Farm Center

2026–27 Big Ten women's basketball standings
	Conf.				Overall
Team	W		L	PCT	W		L	PCT
Indiana	0	–	0	–	5	–	0	1.000
No. 23 Nebraska	0	–	0	–	5	–	0	1.000
Rutgers	0	–	0	–	5	–	0	1.000
No. 2 Michigan	0	–	0	–	4	–	0	1.000
Michigan State	0	–	0	–	4	–	0	1.000
No. 17 Minnesota	0	–	0	–	4	–	0	1.000
Purdue	0	–	0	–	4	–	0	1.000
No. 10 UCLA	0	–	0	–	4	–	0	1.000
No. 16 Washington	0	–	0	–	4	–	0	1.000
No. 21 Illinois	0	–	0	–	3	–	0	1.000
Oregon	0	–	0	–	5	–	1	.833
Wisconsin	0	–	0	–	5	–	1	.833
No. 8 Iowa	0	–	0	–	4	–	1	.800
No. 19т Ohio State	0	–	0	–	4	–	1	.800
No. 4 USC	0	–	0	–	3	–	1	.750
No. 18 Maryland	0	–	0	–	2	–	1	.667
Northwestern	0	–	0	–	2	–	3	.400
Penn State	0	–	0	–	0	–	4	.000
† 2027 Big Ten tournament winner As of November 19, 2026; Rankings from AP poll

The 2026–27 Illinois Fighting Illini women's basketball team currently represents the University of Illinois during the 2026–27 NCAA Division I women's basketball season. The Fighting Illini, led by fifth-year head coach Shauna Green, play their home games at State Farm Center in Champaign, Illinois, and compete as a member of the Big Ten Conference.

== Previous season ==
The Fighting Illini finished the 2025–26 season with a 22–12 record, 9–9 in Big Ten play to finish in tenth place. As the No. 10 seed in the Big Ten tournament, they lost in the quarter finals to number 2 Iowa.

They later received an at-large bid to the NCAA tournament as the No. 7 seed in the Fort Worth regional 1. The Illini were the youngest team in the tournament. They defeated number 10 Colorado, which was their second NCAA tournament win in two consecutive seasons, before losing in the second round to number 2 Vanderbilt to end their season.

At the end of the 2025–26 season, Illinois won games in both the Big Ten Tournament and NCAA Tournament for the first time since 1999–2000.

=== Accolades ===
Three Illini players earned All-Big Ten honors after the end of the 2025–26 season. Berry Wallace was named to the league's first team in the coaches' poll, while earning second team honors by the media. Wallace is the 19th player in program history to receive All-Big Ten first team accolades. Destiny Jackson and Cearah Parchment were named to the All-Freshman team by both the coaches and media. In addition, Parchment earned an honorable mention All-Big Ten status by the league's coaches.

Junior Maddie Webber earned Academic All-District honors from the College Sports Communicators.

== Offseason ==
In April 2026, coach Jackie Alexander was chosen as the new women's basketball head coach at Morehead State.

On May 26, 2026, Illinois announced the hiring of Simon Harris as an assistant coach, replacing Alexander. Most recently, Harris served as assistant coach for NC State, having worked previously at other institutions since 2011. He also was an assistant coach for Green at Dayton from 2016–18 and both Green and Harris served as assistant coaches at Dayton for the 2014–15 season, when the Flyers made it to the NCAA women's tournament Elite Eight.

In September 2026, Green's contract was extended for a second time, through the 2035–36 season, to be based on team performance during that time period.

On October 1, 2026, junior Berry Wallace was selected for the 2026–27 Big Ten preseason first team.

On October 2, 2026, the team announced that freshman Lana Brenjo would miss the entire 2026–27 season due to tearing her ACL during a preseason workout.

=== Departures ===
Illinois departures
Name	Num.	Pos.	Height	Year	Hometown	Reason for departure
Erica Finney	3	Guard	6'0"	Freshman	Sydney, Australia	Transferred to Loyola Marymount
Naomi Benson	21	Forward	6'2"	Freshman	Streetsboro, OH	Transferred to Cincinnati
Gisela Segura	24	Forward	5'11"	Graduate Student	Cervera, Spain	Graduated
Hayven Smith	25	Center	6'6"	Sophomore	Frankfort, IL	Transferred to Western Kentucky

=== Incoming transfers ===
Illinois incoming transfers
Name	Num.	Pos.	Height	Year	Hometown	Previous school
Divine Bourrage	5	Guard	5'11"	Sophomore	Davenport, IA	LSU
Ona Riopedre	24	Guard	6'0"	Junior	Barcelona, Spain	Raritan Valley CC (NJCAA)

=== Recruiting ===
There were no ranked recruits for the class of 2026.

== Roster ==
2026–27 Illinois Fighting Illini women's basketball team
Players
Coaches

Pos.	#	Name	Height	Year	Previous school	Hometown
G	2	Destiny Jackson	5 ft 6 in (1.68 m)	So	Whitney M. Young Magnet High School	Chicago, IL
G	4	Gretchen Dolan	5 ft 11 in (1.8 m)	RS Jr	Williamsville South High School	Buffalo, NY
G	5	Divine Bourrage	5 ft 11 in (1.8 m)	So	LSU	Davenport, IA
F	6	Irene Noya Catoira	6 ft 3 in (1.91 m)	Jr	Institut Joaquim Blume	Vilagarcía de Arousa, Spain
G	8	Jasmine Brown-Hagger	5 ft 9 in (1.75 m)	Sr	Mississippi State	Shorewood, IL
F	9	Lana Brenjo (injured)	6 ft 4 in (1.93 m)	Fr	Belgrade Sports Gymnasium	Nevesinje, Bosnia
G	11	Aaliyah Guyton	5 ft 7 in (1.7 m)	Jr	Iowa	Peoria, IL
G	12	Mia Zenere	5 ft 11 in (1.8 m)	Jr	Example Academy	Mokena, IL
F	14	Morgan Baptist	6 ft 0 in (1.83 m)	Fr	Example Academy	Kankakee, IL
F	21	Manuella Alves	6 ft 3 in (1.91 m)	RS Fr	IMG Academy	Rio de Janeiro, Brazil
F	23	Berry Wallace	6 ft 1 in (1.85 m)	Jr	Pickerington Central	Pickerington, OH
G	24	Ona Riopedre	6 ft 0 in (1.83 m)	Jr	Raritan Valley CC	Barcelona, Spain
F	30	Cearah Parchment	6 ft 3 in (1.91 m)	So	Fort Erie International Academy	Whitby, Ontario, Canada
G	34	Maddie Webber	5 ft 11 in (1.8 m)	Sr	Villanova	Bridgeville, PA
C	35	Lety Vasconcelos	6 ft 7 in (2.01 m)	RS Jr	Baylor	Miguel Calmon, Brazil

Head coach

- Shauna Green (Canisius)

Assistant coach(es)

- Calamity McEntire (Eastern Oklahoma State)
- Britney Anderson (Virginia Tech)
- DeAntoine Beasley (Tennessee Tech)
- Emily Durr (Iowa State)
- Simon Harris (NC State)

Legend

- (C) Team captain
- (S) Suspended
- (I) Ineligible
- (W) Walk-on
- Injured
- Current redshirt

Roster

== Schedule and results ==
Date time, TV	Rank^{#}	Opponent^{#}	Result	Record	High points	High rebounds	High assists	Site (attendance) city, state
Exhibition
October 30, 2026*; 6:00 p.m., B1G+	No. 23	Illinois–Springfield	W 88–44	0–0	14 – Tied	9 – Parchment	7 – Guyton	State Farm Center (4,301); Champaign, IL
Regular season
November 4, 2026*; 6:00 p.m., B1G+	No. 23	Detroit Mercy	W 84–50	1–0	22 – Parchment	11 – Tied	9 – Jackson	State Farm Center (4,010); Champaign, IL
November 7, 2026*; 2:00 p.m., B1G+	No. 23	Southern	W 99–28	2–0	18 – Parchment	10 – Alves	7 – Jackson	State Farm Center (4,768); Champaign, IL
November 15, 2026*; 2:00 p.m., B1G+	No. 22	Southeast Missouri State	W 105–49	3–0	20 – Wallace	11 – Parchment	7 – Jackson	State Farm Center (4,693); Champaign, IL
November 18, 2026*; 5:30 p.m., ESPN+	No. 21	at Ball State	W 91–51	4–0	22 – Wallace	8 – Bourrage	3 – Tied	Worthen Arena (1,782); Muncie, IN
November 27, 2026*; 10:00 a.m., BDG Live		vs. Marquette; Baha Mar Hoops Nassau Championship						Baha Mar Convention Center; Nassau, Bahamas
November 29, 2026*; 10:00 a.m., BDG Live		vs. Saint Joseph's; Baha Mar Hoops Nassau Championship						Baha Mar Convention Center; Nassau, Bahamas
December 5, 2026; 2:00 p.m., B1G+		at Wisconsin						Kohl Center; Madison, WI
December 7, 2026*; 11:00 a.m., B1G+		Chicago State						State Farm Center; Champaign, IL
December 10, 2026*; 7:00 p.m., BTN		Missouri; Braggin' Rights						State Farm Center; Champaign, IL
December 13, 2026*; 2:00 p.m., B1G+		Evansville						State Farm Center; Champaign, IL
December 18, 2026*; 6:00 p.m., B1G+		Western Illinois						State Farm Center; Champaign, IL
December 20, 2026*; 2:00 p.m., B1G+		Wright State						State Farm Center; Champaign, IL
December 22, 2026*; 11:00 a.m., B1G+		Old Dominion						State Farm Center; Champaign, IL
December 29, 2026; 12:00 p.m., Peacock/NBCSN		Iowa						State Farm Center; Champaign, IL
January 2, 2027; 1:00 p.m., B1G+		at Rutgers						Jersey Mike's Arena; Piscataway, NJ
January 7, 2027; 8:00 p.m., Peacock/NBCSN		Washington						State Farm Center; Champaign, IL
January 10, 2027; 1:30 p.m., BTN		Purdue						State Farm Center; Champaign, IL
January 13, 2027; 5:30 p.m., B1G+		at Ohio State						Value City Arena; Columbus, OH
January 17, 2027; 2:00 p.m., B1G+		Michigan State						State Farm Center; Champaign, IL
January 20, 2027; 7:00 p.m., Peacock/NBCSN		Michigan						State Farm Center; Champaign, IL
January 23, 2027; 1:00 p.m., B1G+		at Northwestern						Welsh–Ryan Arena; Evanston, IL
January 26, 2027; 6:00 p.m., B1G+		Nebraska						State Farm Center; Champaign, IL
January 30, 2027; 2:00 p.m., Peacock/NBCSN		at UCLA						Pauley Pavilion; Los Angeles, CA
February 2, 2027; 9:00 p.m., Peacock/NBCSN		at USC						Galen Center; Los Angeles, CA
February 7, 2027; 3:00 p.m., BTN		Northwestern						State Farm Center; Champaign, IL
February 13, 2027; 2:00 p.m., B1G+		Oregon						State Farm Center; Champaign, IL
February 17, 2027; 6:00 p.m., B1G+		at Maryland						Xfinity Center; College Park, MD
February 21, 2027; 1:00 p.m., FS1		at Indiana						Simon Skjodt Assembly Hall; Bloomington, IN
February 25, 2027; 7:30 p.m., BTN		Penn State						State Farm Center; Champaign, IL
February 28, 2027; 2:00 p.m., Peacock/NBCSN		at Minnesota						The Barn; Minneapolis, MN
*Non-conference game. ^{#}Rankings from AP Poll. (#) Tournament seedings in parentheses. All times are in Central.

== Rankings ==
Ranking movements Legend: ██ Increase in ranking ██ Decrease in ranking
	Week																				
Poll	Pre	1	2	3	4	5	6	7	8	9	10	11	12	13	14	15	16	17	18	19	Final
AP	23	22	21																		
Coaches	22	21	21																		

== See also ==
- 2026–27 Illinois Fighting Illini men's basketball team
