= 2026–27 Minnesota Golden Gophers women's basketball team =

Intercollegiate basketball season

2026–27 Minnesota Golden Gophers women's basketball
- Conference: Big Ten Conference

Ranking
- Coaches: No. 16
- AP: No. 17
- Record: 6–0 (0–0 Big Ten)
- Head coach: Dawn Plitzuweit (4th season)
- Associate head coach: Jason Jeschke
- Assistant coaches: Aaron Horn; Aerial Braker; Tyler VanWinkle
- Home arena: The Barn

2026–27 Big Ten women's basketball standings
	Conf.				Overall
Team	W		L	PCT	W		L	PCT
Rutgers	0	–	0	–	7	–	0	1.000
Indiana	0	–	0	–	6	–	0	1.000
No. 2 Michigan	0	–	0	–	5	–	0	1.000
Michigan State	0	–	0	–	5	–	0	1.000
No. 17 Minnesota	0	–	0	–	5	–	0	1.000
No. 23 Nebraska	0	–	0	–	5	–	0	1.000
No. 10 UCLA	0	–	0	–	5	–	0	1.000
No. 16 Washington	0	–	0	–	5	–	0	1.000
No. 21 Illinois	0	–	0	–	4	–	0	1.000
Oregon	0	–	0	–	6	–	1	.857
No. 8 Iowa	0	–	0	–	5	–	1	.833
No. 19т Ohio State	0	–	0	–	5	–	1	.833
Wisconsin	0	–	0	–	5	–	1	.833
No. 18 Maryland	0	–	0	–	4	–	1	.800
No. 4 USC	0	–	0	–	4	–	1	.800
Purdue	0	–	0	–	4	–	2	.667
Northwestern	0	–	0	–	3	–	4	.429
Penn State	0	–	0	–	1	–	4	.200
† 2027 Big Ten tournament winner As of November 22, 2026; Rankings from AP poll

The 2026–27 Minnesota Golden Gophers women's basketball team represents the University of Minnesota during the 2026–27 NCAA Division I women's basketball season. The Golden Gophers, led by fourth-year head coach Dawn Plitzuweit, play their home games at The Barn in Minneapolis, Minnesota, and compete as a member of the Big Ten Conference.

== Previous season ==
The Golden Gophers finished the 2025–26 season 24–9 overall and 13–5 in Big Ten play, to finish fourth in the conference, their highest finish since the 2017–18 season. As the No. 4 seed in the Big Ten tournament, they earned a bye to the quarterfinals, where they lost to No. 5 Ohio State.

Following the Big Ten tournament elimination, the Golden Gophers received an at-large bid to the NCAA Tournament for the first time since 2018, seeded No. 4 seed in the Sacramento #2 Regional. They defeated No. 13 Green Bay in the first round, before defeating No. 5 Ole Miss 65–63 in the second round with a game-winning two-point shot by senior guard Amaya Battle. The Golden Gophers advanced to the Sweet Sixteen for the first time since 2005, where they lost to fellow Big Ten member and eventual NCAA champions in top-seeded UCLA.

== Offseason ==
=== Departures ===
Minnesota departures
Name	Num	Pos.	Height	Year	Hometown	Reason for departure
Tracey Bershers	1	Forward	6'2"	Senior	Fort Smith, AR	Graduated, transferred to Kennesaw State
Amaya Battle	3	Guard	5'11"	Senior	Hopkins, MN	Graduated; signed to play professionally in Italy with Logiman Broni
Brylee Glenn	12	Guard	5'10"	Graduate student	Kansas City, MO	Graduated
Finau Tonga	31	Forward	6'2"	Graduate student	Taylorsville, UT	Graduated
Niamya Holloway	41	Forward	6'0"	(redshirt) Junior	Eden Prairie, MN	Transferred to Creighton
Sophie Hart	52	Center	6'5"	Graduate student	Farmington, MN	Graduated

=== Incoming transfers ===
Minnesota incoming transfers
Name	Num	Pos.	Height	Year	Hometown	Previous school
Tayla Thomas	0	Forward	6'3"	Junior	East Orange, NJ	Northwestern
Leah Harmon	6	Guard	5'6"	Junior	Paterson, NJ	UCF
Gracie Merkle	44	C	6' 6"	5th Year	Mount Washington, KY	Penn State

=== Recruiting class ===
College recruiting
Name	Hometown	School	Height	Weight	Commit date
Natalie Kussow; G	Hartland, WI	Arrowhead High School	5 ft 10 in (1.78 m)	N/A	
Natalie Kussow; G	Recruit ratings: Rivals: 247Sports: ESPN: (94)				
Tori Oehrlein; G	Crosby, MN	Crosby-Ironton High School	5 ft 11 in (1.80 m)	N/A	
Tori Oehrlein; G	Recruit ratings: Rivals: 247Sports: ESPN: (94)				
Overall recruit ranking: ESPN: 18
Note: In many cases, Scout, Rivals, 247Sports, On3, and ESPN may conflict in their listings of height and weight.; In these cases, the average was taken. ESPN grades are on a 100-point scale.; Sources: "2026 Player Commits". ESPN. Archived from the original on September 8, 2025.

== Roster ==
Years are listed according to the new NCAA age-based eligibility model.

2026–27 Minnesota Golden Gophers women's basketball team
Players
Coaches

Pos.	#	Name	Height	Year	Previous school	Hometown
F	0	Tayla Thomas	6 ft 3 in (1.91 m)	Jr	IMG Academy; Northwestern	East Orange, NJ
G	6	Leah Harmon	5 ft 6 in (1.68 m)	Jr	IMG Academy; UCF	Paterson, NJ
G	10	Mara Braun (5th)	6 ft 0 in (1.83 m)	Sr	Wayzata High School	Wayzata, MN
F	11	Adit Kuol	6 ft 3 in (1.91 m)	Fr	The King's Academy	South Sudan
G	14	Tori McKinney	6 ft 1 in (1.85 m)	Jr	Minnetonka High School	Minnetonka, MN
G	15	Brynn Senden	5 ft 6 in (1.68 m)	Sr	Wayzata High School	Wayzata, MN
F	20	Taylor Woodson	6 ft 0 in (1.83 m)	Sr	Hopkins High School; Michigan	Minnetonka, MN
G	21	Natalie Kussow	5 ft 11 in (1.8 m)	Fr	Arrowhead High School	Hartland, WI
G	22	Kennedy Klick	5 ft 11 in (1.8 m)	Sr	Maple Grove Senior High School	Brooklyn Park, MN
G/F	25	Grace Grocholski	5 ft 10 in (1.78 m)	Sr	Kettle Moraine High School	North Prairie, WI
C	30	Zoey Bershers	6 ft 3 in (1.91 m)	So	Farmington High School	Glenwood, AR
G	33	Tori Oehrlein	5 ft 10 in (1.78 m)	Fr	Crosby-Ironton High School	Crosby-Ironton, MN
G	35	Makena Christian	6 ft 0 in (1.83 m)	So	Hartford Union High School	Lomira, WI
F	42	Kylee Paben	6 ft 0 in (1.83 m)	Fr	Millard West High School	Omaha, NE
C	44	Gracie Merkle (5th)	6 ft 6 in (1.98 m)	Sr	Bullitt Central High School; Penn State	Mount Washington, KY

Head coach

- Dawn Plitzuweit (Michigan Tech)

Assistant coach(es)

- Jason Jeschke (Southwestern (KS))
- Aaron Horn (Toledo)
- Ariel Braker (Notre Dame)
- Tyler VanWinkle (Illinois State)

Legend

- (C) Team captain
- (S) Suspended
- (I) Ineligible
- (W) Walk-on
- (5th) Fifth year senior
- Injured
- Current redshirt

Roster
Last update: July 26, 2026

== Schedule and results ==
Date time, TV	Rank^{#}	Opponent^{#}	Result	Record	High points	High rebounds	High assists	Site (attendance) city, state
Regular season
November 2, 2026*; 5:00 p.m., B1G+	No. 17	Harvard	W 82–62	1–0	22 – Merkle	10 – Thomas	5 – Grocholski	The Barn (7,185); Minneapolis, MN
November 7, 2026*; 2:00 p.m., ESPN+	No. 17	at Marquette	W 87–79	2–0	25 – Grocholski	11 – Grocholski	6 – Kussow	Al McGuire Center (1,450); Milwaukee, WI
November 10, 2026*; 7:00 p.m., B1G+	No. 18	Southern	W 86–47	3–0	19 – Braun	7 – Thomas	4 – Kussow	The Barn (3,646); Minneapolis, MN
November 14, 2026*; 1:00 p.m., B1G+	No. 18	vs. Kansas State; MarketBeat Invitational	W 68–65	4–0	15 – Kussow	8 – Tied	4 – Braun	Sanford Pentagon; Sioux Falls, SD
November 18, 2026*; 7:00 p.m., Peacock/NBCSN	No. 17	Kansas	W 76–58	5–0	20 – Kussow	11 – Merkle	4 – Tied	The Barn (3,872); Minneapolis, MN
November 22, 2026*; 2:00 p.m., B1G+	No. 17	Central Michigan	W 82–31	6–0	15 – Tied	9 – Merkle	7 – Harmon	The Barn (4,304); Minneapolis, MN
November 26, 2026*; 5:30 p.m., FloCollege		vs. Missouri State; Cancún Challenge Riviera Tournament						Hard Rock Hotel Riviera Maya; Cancún, Mexico
November 27, 2026*; 8:00 p.m., FloCollege		vs. Cincinnati; Cancun Challenge Riviera Tournament						Hard Rock Hotel Riviera Maya; Cancún, Mexico
December 2, 2026*; 7:00 p.m., B1G+		St. Thomas (MN)						The Barn; Minneapolis, MN
December 6, 2026; 1:00 p.m., BTN		at Purdue						Mackey Arena; West Lafayette, IN
December 9, 2026*; 7:00 p.m., B1G+		Northern Iowa						The Barn; Minneapolis, MN
December 12, 2026*; 2:00 p.m., B1G+		Kansas City						The Barn; Minneapolis, MN
December 15, 2026*; 7:00 p.m., B1G+		Mercyhurst						The Barn; Minneapolis, MN
December 20, 2026*; 10:00 a.m., B1G+		Grambling State						The Barn; Minneapolis, MN
December 30, 2026; 3:00 p.m., B1G+		at Maryland						Xfinity Center; College Park, MD
January 2, 2027; 5:00 p.m., BTN		Indiana						The Barn; Minneapolis, MN
January 5, 2027; 7:00 p.m., B1G+		Penn State						The Barn; Minneapolis, MN
January 9, 2027; 11:00 a.m., FOX		Iowa						The Barn; Minneapolis, MN
January 12, 2027; 9:30 p.m., BTN		at UCLA						Pauley Pavilion; Los Angeles, CA
January 15, 2027; 9:00 p.m., B1G+		at USC						Galen Center; Los Angeles, CA
January 21, 2027; 7:30 p.m., BTN		Wisconsin						The Barn; Minneapolis, MN
January 24, 2027; 1:00 p.m., BTN		at Ohio State						Value City Arena; Columbus, OH
January 28, 2027; 8:00 p.m., BTN		Oregon						The Barn; Minneapolis, MN
February 4, 2027; 6:30 p.m., B1G+		at Wisconsin						Kohl Center; Madison, WI
February 7, 2027; 2:00 p.m., B1G+		Rutgers						The Barn; Minneapolis, MN
February 11, 2027; 7:00 p.m., BTN		at Nebraska						Pinnacle Bank Arena; Lincoln, NE
February 14, 2027; 1:00 p.m., B1G+		at Michigan State						Breslin Center; East Lansing, MI
February 17, 2027; 7:00 p.m., B1G+		Michigan						The Barn; Minneapolis, MN
February 20, 2027; 3:00 p.m., FS1		Washington						The Barn; Minneapolis, MN
February 25, 2027; 6:00 p.m., B1G+		at Northwestern						Welsh–Ryan Arena; Evanston, IL
February 28, 2027; 2:00 p.m., Peacock/NBCSN		Illinois						The Barn; Minneapolis, MN
*Non-conference game. ^{#}Rankings from AP Poll. (#) Tournament seedings in parentheses. All times are in Central Time.

== Rankings ==
Ranking movements Legend: ██ Increase in ranking ██ Decrease in ranking
	Week																				
Poll	Pre	1	2	3	4	5	6	7	8	9	10	11	12	13	14	15	16	17	18	19	Final
AP	17	18	17																		
Coaches	18	17	16																		
