= 2026–27 Washington Huskies women's basketball team =

2026–27 Washington Huskies women's basketball
- Conference: Big Ten Conference

Ranking
- Coaches: No. 17
- AP: No. 16
- Record: 5–0 (0–0 Big Ten)
- Head coach: Tina Langley (6th season)
- Associate head coach: Tasha Brown; Latara King; Aleah Goodman
- Assistant coaches: Lauren Wilson; Drew Wilson; Patrick Bowlin
- Home arena: Alaska Airlines Arena

2026–27 Big Ten women's basketball standings
	Conf.				Overall
Team	W		L	PCT	W		L	PCT
Indiana	0	–	0	–	6	–	0	1.000
Rutgers	0	–	0	–	6	–	0	1.000
No. 2 Michigan	0	–	0	–	5	–	0	1.000
Michigan State	0	–	0	–	5	–	0	1.000
No. 17 Minnesota	0	–	0	–	5	–	0	1.000
No. 23 Nebraska	0	–	0	–	5	–	0	1.000
No. 10 UCLA	0	–	0	–	5	–	0	1.000
No. 16 Washington	0	–	0	–	5	–	0	1.000
No. 21 Illinois	0	–	0	–	4	–	0	1.000
Oregon	0	–	0	–	6	–	1	.857
No. 8 Iowa	0	–	0	–	5	–	1	.833
No. 19т Ohio State	0	–	0	–	5	–	1	.833
Wisconsin	0	–	0	–	5	–	1	.833
Purdue	0	–	0	–	4	–	1	.800
No. 4 USC	0	–	0	–	4	–	1	.800
No. 18 Maryland	0	–	0	–	3	–	1	.750
Northwestern	0	–	0	–	2	–	4	.333
Penn State	0	–	0	–	1	–	4	.200
† 2027 Big Ten tournament winner As of November 21, 2026; Rankings from AP poll

The 2026–27 Washington Huskies women's basketball team represents the University of Washington during the 2026–27 NCAA Division I women's basketball season. The Huskies, led by sixth-year head coach Tina Langley, played their home games at Alaska Airlines Arena at Hec Edmundson Pavilion in Seattle, Washington as members of the Big Ten Conference.

== Previous season ==
The Huskies finished the 2025–26 season 22–11, 10–8 in Big Ten play to finish in eighth place. As the No. 8 seed in the Big Ten tournament, they defeated USC in the second round before losing to UCLA in the quarterfinals. They received an at-large bid to the NCAA tournament as No. 6 seed in the Sacramento region 4, where they defeated South Dakota State in the first round, then lost in overtime to eventual elite-eight contender TCU.

== Offseason ==
=== Departures ===
Washington departures
Name	Num	Pos.	Height	Year	Hometown	Reason for departure
Hannah Stines	1	G	5'11"	Senior	La Mirada, CA	Graduated
Teagan Brown	5	G	5'10"	Senior	Sacramento, CA	Graduated
Chloe Briggs	11	G	5'11"	Junior	Ontario, CA	Transferred to California Baptist
Shayla Gillmer	22	F	6'1"	Senior	San Clemente, CA	Walk-on; graduated
Olivia Anderson	23	F	6'6"	Junior	Ellensburg, WA	Transferred to UC Santa Barbara
Elle Ladine	24	G	5'11"	Senior	San Francisco, CA	Graduated/undrafted in 2026 WNBA draft; signed with the Seattle Storm
Sienna Harvey	35	G	5'10"	Freshman	Geelong, Australia	Transferred to Iowa State
Yulia Grabovskaia	55	C	6'5"	Senior	Rostov-on-Don, Russia	Graduated

=== Incoming ===
Washington incoming transfers
Name	Num	Pos.	Height	Year	Hometown	Previous school
Brooke Carlson	1	G	5'8"	Junior	Batavia, IL	Colorado State
Tilda Trygger	18	F	6'6"	Junior	Stockholm, Sweden	NC State
Kaelyn Carroll	20	F	6'3"	Sophomore	Dedham, MA	Kentucky
Macey Huard	24	G	6'2"	Senior	Highlands Ranch, CO	Oklahoma State

=== Recruiting classes ===
==== 2026 recruiting class ====
College recruiting
Name	Hometown	School	Height	Weight	Commit date
Amayah Garcia; G	Fort Worth, TX	Faith Family Academy	5 ft 11 in (1.80 m)	N/A	October 2025
Amayah Garcia; G	Recruit ratings: ESPN: (94)				
Overall recruit ranking:
Note: In many cases, Scout, Rivals, 247Sports, On3, and ESPN may conflict in their listings of height and weight.; In these cases, the average was taken. ESPN grades are on a 100-point scale.; Sources: "2026 Player Commits". ESPN. Archived from the original on March 27, 2027.

==== 2027 recruiting class ====
College recruiting (2027)
Name	Hometown	School	Height	Weight	Commit date
Jessie Moses; G	Penn Valley, PA	IMG Academy	5 ft 9 in (1.75 m)	N/A	
Jessie Moses; G	Recruit ratings: ESPN: (94)				
Ze'ni Patterson; G	San Jose, CA	Archbishop Mitty High School	5 ft 9 in (1.75 m)	N/A	
Ze'ni Patterson; G	Recruit ratings: ESPN: (92)				
Overall recruit ranking:
Note: In many cases, Scout, Rivals, 247Sports, On3, and ESPN may conflict in their listings of height and weight.; In these cases, the average was taken. ESPN grades are on a 100-point scale.; Sources: "2027 Player Commits". ESPN. Archived from the original on November 12, 2026.

== Roster ==
2026–27 Washington Huskies women's basketball team
Players
Coaches

Pos.	#	Name	Height	Year	Previous school	Hometown
G	0	Sayvia Sellers	5 ft 7 in (1.7 m)	Sr	Anchorage Christian	Anchorage, AK
G	1	Brooke Carlson	5 ft 8 in (1.73 m)	Jr	Batavia; Colorado State	Batavia, IL
G	2	Avery Howell	6 ft 0 in (1.83 m)	Jr	Boise; USC	Boise, ID
G	3	Devin Coppinger	5 ft 10 in (1.78 m)	Jr	Nooksack Valley	Everson, WA
F	8	Daniella McLean	6 ft 3 in (1.91 m)	So	Darrow School	Cobourg, ON
F	18	Tilda Trygger	6 ft 6 in (1.98 m)	Jr	NB Paterna; NC State	Stockholm, Sweden
F	20	Kaelyn Carroll	6 ft 3 in (1.91 m)	So	Tabor Academy; Kentucky	Dedham, MA
F	21	Brynn McGaughy	6 ft 3 in (1.91 m)	So	Central Valley	Spokane, WA
F	22	Nina Cain	6 ft 2 in (1.88 m)	So	McClathy	Sacramento, CA
G	24	Macey Huard	6 ft 2 in (1.88 m)	Sr	Valor Christian; Oklahoma State	Highlands Ranch, CO
G	25	Amayah Garcia	5 ft 11 in (1.8 m)	Fr	Faith Family Academy (TX)	Fort Worth, TX
F	42	Petra Toman	6 ft 2 in (1.88 m)	Jr		Budapest, Hungary

Head coach

- Tina Langley (West Alabama)

Assistant coach(es)

- Tasha Brown (St. Ambrose)
- Latara King (Florida Memorial)
- Aleah Goodman (Oregon State)
- Lauren Wilson (Washington)
- Drew Wilson (Centre College)
- Patrick Bowlin (St. John's)

Legend

- (C) Team captain
- (S) Suspended
- (I) Ineligible
- (W) Walk-on
- Injured
- Current redshirt

Roster

== Schedule and results ==
Date time, TV	Rank^{#}	Opponent^{#}	Result	Record	High points	High rebounds	High assists	Site (attendance) city, state
Regular season
November 2, 2026*; 11:00 a.m., B1G+	No. 16	UC San Diego	W 79–63	1–0	25 – Sellers	15 – McGaughy	10 – Sellers	Alaska Airlines Arena (1,372); Seattle, WA
November 5, 2026*; 7:00 p.m., B1G+	No. 16	Pacific	W 75–54	2–0	17 – Sellers	8 – Trygger	7 – Sellers	Alaska Airlines Arena (841); Seattle, WA
November 12, 2026*; 7:00 p.m., B1G+	No. 16	Cal State Bakersfield	W 85–51	3–0	21 – Howell	7 – Trygger	5 – Sellers	Alaska Airlines Arena; Seattle, WA
November 17, 2026*; 7:30 p.m., YouTube	No. 16	at Washington State	W 82–54	4–0	22 – Howell	9 – Howell	7 – Sellers	Beasley Coliseum (1,369); Pullman, WA
November 20, 2026*; 7:00 p.m., Peacock/NBCSN	No. 16	Stanford	W 105–50	5–0	21 – McGaughy	6 – McGaughy	9 – Sellers	Alaska Airlines Arena (3,785); Seattle, WA
November 22, 2026*; 2:00 p.m., B1G+	No. 16	Cal Poly						Alaska Airlines Arena; Seattle, WA
November 27, 2026*; 10:30 a.m., BDG Live		vs. Oklahoma State; Coconut Hoops Blue Heron Division						Alico Arena; Fort Myers, FL
November 28, 2026*; 10:30 a.m., BDG Live		vs. UMass; Coconut Hoops Blue Heron Division						Alico Arena; Fort Myers, FL
December 5, 2026; 3:00 p.m., Peacock/NBCSN		USC						Alaska Airlines Arena; Seattle, WA
December 10, 2026*; 7:00 p.m., B1G+		Southern						Alaska Airlines Arena; Seattle, WA
December 12, 2026*; 2:00 p.m., B1G+		Northern Colorado						Alaska Airlines Arena; Seattle, WA
December 17, 2026*; 7:00 p.m., B1G+		Santa Clara						Alaska Airlines Arena; Seattle, WA
December 20, 2026*; 2:00 p.m., B1G+		Portland State						Alaska Airlines Arena; Seattle, WA
December 29, 2026; 5:00 p.m., B1G+		at Nebraska						Pinnacle Bank Arena; Lincoln, NE
January 2, 2027; 2:00 p.m., B1G+		Wisconsin						Alaska Airlines Arena; Seattle, WA
January 7, 2027; 6:00 p.m., Peacock/NBCSN		at Illinois						State Farm Center; Champaign, IL
January 10, 2027; 11:00 a.m., B1G+		at Northwestern						Welsh–Ryan Arena; Evanston, IL
January 14, 2027; 6:00 p.m., BTN		Maryland						Alaska Airlines Arena; Seattle, WA
January 17, 2027; 2:00 p.m., B1G+		Purdue						Alaska Airlines Arena; Seattle, WA
January 20, 2027; 3:30 p.m., B1G+		at Michigan State						Breslin Center; East Lansing, MI
January 23, 2027; 2:00 p.m., Peacock/NBCSN		at Michigan						Crisler Center; Ann Arbor, MI
January 27, 2027; 6:00 p.m., Peacock/NBCSN		Iowa						Alaska Airlines Arena; Seattle, WA
February 4, 2027; 7:00 p.m., BTN		at Oregon						Matthew Knight Arena; Eugene, OR
February 7, 2027; 3:00 p.m., BTN		Indiana						Alaska Airlines Arena; Seattle, WA
February 10, 2027; 3:30 p.m., B1G+		at Ohio State						Value City Arena; Columbus, OH
February 13, 2027; 10:00 a.m., B1G+		at Penn State						Rec Hall; State College, PA
February 17, 2027; 7:00 p.m., B1G+		Rutgers						Alaska Airlines Arena; Seattle, WA
February 20, 2027; 1:00 p.m., FS1		at Minnesota						The Barn; Minneapolis, MN
February 25, 2027; 7:30 p.m., BTN		Oregon						Alaska Airlines Arena; Seattle, WA
February 28, 2027; 11:00 a.m., BTN		UCLA						Alaska Airlines Arena; Seattle, WA
Big Ten Women's Tournament
March 3–7, 2027; TBA		vs.						T-Mobile Arena; Paradise, NV
*Non-conference game. ^{#}Rankings from AP Poll. (#) Tournament seedings in parentheses. All times are in Pacific Time.

== Rankings ==
Ranking movements Legend: ██ Increase in ranking ██ Decrease in ranking
	Week																				
Poll	Pre	1	2	3	4	5	6	7	8	9	10	11	12	13	14	15	16	17	18	19	Final
AP	16	16	16																		
Coaches	15	16	17																		

== See also ==
- 2026–27 Washington Huskies men's basketball team
