= 2026–27 Nebraska Cornhuskers women's basketball team =

American college basketball season

2026–27 Nebraska Cornhuskers women's basketball
- Conference: Big Ten Conference

Ranking
- Coaches: No. 23
- AP: No. 23
- Record: 6–0 (0–0 Big Ten)
- Head coach: Amy Williams (11th season)
- Assistant coaches: Julian Assibey; Tandem Mays; Jessica Keller; Taylor Edwards; Brad Fischer
- Home arena: Pinnacle Bank Arena

2026–27 Big Ten women's basketball standings
	Conf.				Overall
Team	W		L	PCT	W		L	PCT
Rutgers	0	–	0	–	7	–	0	1.000
Indiana	0	–	0	–	6	–	0	1.000
No. 2 Michigan	0	–	0	–	5	–	0	1.000
Michigan State	0	–	0	–	5	–	0	1.000
No. 17 Minnesota	0	–	0	–	5	–	0	1.000
No. 23 Nebraska	0	–	0	–	5	–	0	1.000
No. 10 UCLA	0	–	0	–	5	–	0	1.000
No. 16 Washington	0	–	0	–	5	–	0	1.000
No. 21 Illinois	0	–	0	–	4	–	0	1.000
Oregon	0	–	0	–	6	–	1	.857
No. 8 Iowa	0	–	0	–	5	–	1	.833
No. 19т Ohio State	0	–	0	–	5	–	1	.833
Wisconsin	0	–	0	–	5	–	1	.833
No. 18 Maryland	0	–	0	–	4	–	1	.800
No. 4 USC	0	–	0	–	4	–	1	.800
Purdue	0	–	0	–	4	–	2	.667
Northwestern	0	–	0	–	3	–	4	.429
Penn State	0	–	0	–	1	–	4	.200
† 2027 Big Ten tournament winner As of November 22, 2026; Rankings from AP poll

The 2026–27 Nebraska Cornhuskers women's basketball team will represent the University of Nebraska–Lincoln during the 2026–27 NCAA Division I women's basketball season. The Cornhuskers will be led by head coach Amy Williams in her eleventh season, and will play their home games at the Pinnacle Bank Arena in Lincoln, Nebraska, and compete as a member of the Big Ten Conference.

== Previous season ==
The Cornhuskers finished the 2025–26 season 19–13 overall and 11–7 in Big Ten play, to finish twelfth in the conference. As the No. 12 seed in the Big Ten tournament, they lost a twenty-point lead to ultimately be eliminated in the first round to No. 13 Indiana 69–72.

Following the loss, the team earned an at-large bid to the NCAA tournament, seeded No. 11 in the Sacramento #2 Regional and placing them in the First Four, where they defeated the other No. 11 seed in Richmond to place them into the round of 64. They then lost in the first round 62–67 to No. 6 Baylor to end their season.

== Offseason ==
=== Departures ===
Nebraska departures
Name	Num	Pos.	Height	Year	Hometown	Reason for departure
Alanna Neale	00	Guard	5'10"	Freshman	Los Angeles, CA	Transferred to Seattle
Hailey Weaver	1	Guard	6'0"	Graduate student	Solon, OH	Entered transfer portal
Petra Bozan	4	Forward-Center	6'3"	Sophomore	Split, Croatia	Transferred to Penn State
Claire Johnson	5	Guard	5'9"	Sophomore	Paducah, KY	Transferred to Murray State
Jess Petrie	12	Forward	6'2"	Junior	Gold Coast, Australia	Transferred to Indiana
Callin Hake	14	Guard	5'8"	Senior	Victoria, MN	Transferred to Oklahoma State
Eliza Maupin	21	Forward	6'3"	Senior	Webster Groves, MO	Graduated

=== Incoming transfers ===
Nebraska incoming transfers
Name	Num	Pos.	Height	Year	Hometown	Previous schoool
Arek Angui	00	Center	6'9"	RS Sophomore	Juba, South Sudan	Auburn
Edessa Noyan	8	Forward	6'3"	Senior	Botkyrka, Sweden	Indiana

=== Recruiting class ===
College recruiting
Name	Hometown	School	Height	Weight	Commit date
Ashlyn Koupal; F	Wagner, SD	Wagner Community School	6 ft 3 in (1.91 m)	N/A	
Ashlyn Koupal; F	Recruit ratings: Rivals: 247Sports: ESPN: (95)				
Ava Miles; G	Kansas City, MO	Staley High School	6 ft 0 in (1.83 m)	N/A	
Ava Miles; G	Recruit ratings: Rivals: 247Sports: ESPN: (93)				
Madeline Stewart; G	Claremore, OK	Lincoln Christian School	5 ft 9 in (1.75 m)	N/A	
Madeline Stewart; G	Recruit ratings: Rivals: 247Sports: ESPN: (91)				
Overall recruit ranking: ESPN: 15
Note: In many cases, Scout, Rivals, 247Sports, On3, and ESPN may conflict in their listings of height and weight.; In these cases, the average was taken. ESPN grades are on a 100-point scale.; Sources: "2026 Player Commits". ESPN. Archived from the original on July 28, 2026.

== Roster ==
Years are listed according to the new NCAA age-based eligibility model.

2026–27 Nebraska Cornhuskers women's basketball team
Players
Coaches

Pos.	#	Name	Height	Year	Previous school	Hometown
C	00	Arek Angui	6 ft 9 in (2.06 m)	Jr	Greenforest Academy; Auburn	Juba, South Sudan
G	1	Ava Miles	6 ft 0 in (1.83 m)	Fr	Staley High School	Kansas City, MO
G	2	Logan Nissley	6 ft 0 in (1.83 m)	Sr	Century High School	Bismarck, ND
G	3	Allison Weidner (6th)	5 ft 10 in (1.78 m)	Sr	St. Francis High School	Humphrey, NE
F	8	Edessa Noyan	6 ft 3 in (1.91 m)	Sr	Täljegymnasiet; Indiana	Botkyrka, Sweden
G	10	Maddi Stewart	5 ft 9 in (1.75 m)	Fr	Lincoln Christian School	Claremore, OK
G	15	Kennadi Williams	5 ft 4 in (1.63 m)	Jr	Lincoln Southwest High School	Lincoln, NE
F	22	Natalie Potts	6 ft 2 in (1.88 m)	Sr	Incarnate Word Academy	O'Fallon, MO
G	23	Britt Prince	5 ft 11 in (1.8 m)	Jr	Elkhorn North High School	Omaha, NE
F	24	Ashlyn Koupal	6 ft 3 in (1.91 m)	Fr	Wagner Community School	Wagner, SD
F	33	Amiah Hargrove	6 ft 2 in (1.88 m)	Jr	Christopher High School	Christopher, IL
G/F	34	Emily Fischer	6 ft 0 in (1.83 m)	Sr	Libertyville High School; Maryland	Libertyville, IL

Head coach

- Amy Williams (Nebraska)

Assistant coach(es)

- Julian Assibey (William Penn)
- Tandem Mays (Tulsa)
- Jessica Keller (Quincy)
- Taylor Edwards (Montana State Billings)
- Brad Fischer (UW–La Crosse)

Legend

- (C) Team captain
- (S) Suspended
- (I) Ineligible
- (W) Walk-on
- (6th) Sixth-year senior
- Injured
- Current redshirt

Roster
Last update: July 28, 2026

== Schedule and results ==
Date time, TV	Rank^{#}	Opponent^{#}	Result	Record	High points	High rebounds	High assists	Site (attendance) city, state
Exhibition
October 23, 2026*; 6:00 p.m., B1G+		Wayne State (NE)	W 90–41		20 – Noyan	9 – Noyan	5 – Williams	Pinnacle Bank Arena (4,156); Lincoln, NE
Regular season
November 2, 2026*; 12:00 p.m., B1G+		San Jose State	W 81–54	1–0	23 – Prince	9 – Hargrove	4 – Tied	Pinnacle Bank Arena (8,272); Lincoln, NE
November 7, 2026*; 2:00 p.m., B1G+		Western Illinois	W 98–35	2–0	19 – Prince	8 – Hargrove	4 – Weidner	Pinnacle Bank Arena (4,695); Lincoln, NE
November 10, 2026*; 7:00 p.m., B1G+	No. 25	North Carolina A&T	W 76–35	3–0	24 – Prince	10 – Hargrove	7 – Williams	Pinnacle Bank Arena (4,117); Lincoln, NE
November 14, 2026*; 3:00 p.m., B1G+	No. 25	vs. Kansas; MarketBeat Invitational	W 105–73	4–0	35 – Prince	8 – Potts	5 – Koupal	Sanford Pentagon; Sioux Falls, SD
November 17, 2026*; 7:00 p.m., B1G+	No. 23	Mount St. Mary's	W 113–37	5–0	18 – Potts	10 – Potts	8 – Koupal	Pinnacle Bank Arena (4,108); Lincoln, NE
November 22, 2026*; 1:00 p.m., FS1	No. 23	at Creighton; Rivalry	W 55–45	6–0	18 – Prince	6 – Noyan	6 – Prince	Liberty First Credit Union Arena (2,394); Ralston, NE
November 24, 2026*; 7:00 p.m., B1G+		Kansas City						Pinnacle Bank Arena; Lincoln, NE
December 1, 2026*; 7:00 p.m., B1G+		Omaha						Pinnacle Bank Arena; Lincoln, NE
December 5, 2026; 5:00 p.m., BTN		at Iowa; Rivalry						Carver–Hawkeye Arena; Iowa City, IA
December 8, 2026*; 7:00 p.m., B1G+		North Dakota						Pinnacle Bank Arena; Lincoln, NE
December 12, 2026*; 11:00 a.m., BTN		Texas A&M						Pinnacle Bank Arena; Lincoln, NE
December 20, 2026; 5:00 p.m., BTN		vs. California; Bay Area Women's Classic						Chase Center; San Francisco, CA
December 29, 2026; 7:00 p.m., B1G+		Washington						Pinnacle Bank Arena; Lincoln, NE
January 2, 2027; 7:00 p.m., BTN		at UCLA						Pauley Pavilion; Los Angeles, CA
January 5, 2027; 9:00 p.m., BTN		at USC						Galen Center; Los Angeles, CA
January 10, 2027; 3:30 p.m., BTN		Michigan State						Pinnacle Bank Arena; Lincoln, NE
January 13, 2027; 6:00 p.m., FS1		Michigan						Pinnacle Bank Arena; Lincoln, NE
January 17, 2027; 11:30 a.m./3:30 p.m., FOX		Ohio State						Pinnacle Bank Arena; Lincoln, NE
January 20, 2027; 7:00 p.m., B1G+		at Northwestern						Welsh–Ryan Arena; Evanston, IL
January 26, 2027; 6:00 p.m., B1G+		at Illinois						State Farm Center; Champaign, IL
January 31, 2027; 1:00 p.m., BTN		Oregon						Pinnacle Bank Arena; Lincoln, NE
February 4, 2027; 7:30 p.m., Peacock/NBCSN		Iowa; Rivalry						Pinnacle Bank Arena; Lincoln, NE
February 7, 2027; 11:00 a.m., B1G+		at Purdue						Mackey Arena; West Lafayette, IN
February 11, 2027; 7:00 p.m., BTN		Minnesota						Pinnacle Bank Arena; Lincoln, NE
February 14, 2027; 11:00 a.m., BTN		at Maryland						Xfinity Center; College Park, MD
February 17, 2027; 7:00 p.m., B1G+		Wisconsin						Pinnacle Bank Arena; Lincoln, NE
February 21, 2027; 2:00 p.m., B1G+		Penn State						Pinnacle Bank Arena; Lincoln, NE
February 24, 2027; 6:00 p.m., B1G+		at Rutgers						Jersey Mike's Arena; Piscataway, NJ
February 27, 2027; 11:00 a.m., BTN		at Indiana						Simon Skjodt Assembly Hall; Bloomington, IN
*Non-conference game. ^{#}Rankings from AP Poll. (#) Tournament seedings in parentheses. All times are in Central.

== Rankings ==
Ranking movements Legend: ██ Increase in ranking ██ Decrease in ranking RV = Received votes
	Week																				
Poll	Pre	1	2	3	4	5	6	7	8	9	10	11	12	13	14	15	16	17	18	19	Final
AP	RV	25	23																		
Coaches	RV	25	23																		
