= Gary Redus II =

American basketball coach

Current position
- Title: Head coach
- Team: Rutgers
- Conference: Big Ten
- Record: 0–0 (–)
- Annual salary: $750,000

Biographical details
- Born: June 23, 1989 (age 37); Decatur, Alabama, U.S.
- Height: 6 ft 6 in (198 cm)
- Weight: 182 lb (83 kg; 13 st 0 lb)

Playing career
- 2007–2008: Marion Military Institute
- 2008–2009: Centenary (LA)
- 2009–2011: South Alabama

Coaching career (HC unless noted)
- 2016–2017: West Georgia (GA)
- 2017–2019: Delta State (assistant)
- 2019–2021: Vanderbilt (assistant)
- 2021–2022: SMU (assistant)
- 2022–2026: LSU (assistant)
- 2026–present: Rutgers

Head coaching record
- Overall: 0–0 (–)

Gary Eugene Redus II (born June 23, 1989) is an American basketball coach who is currently the head coach of the Rutgers University women's basketball team.

== Playing career ==
Redus played his freshman year of college basketball at Marion Military Institute before transferring to Centenary College in Louisiana for his sophomore season. He transferred to South Alabama after his sophomore season, citing wanting to be closer to his family and due to Centenary's program being placed on probation.

Redus played professionally in China, the Middle East, and South America before injuries cut his professional career short.

== Coaching career ==
Redus began his coaching career at West Georgia, during which he earned a master's degree. He was also an assistant at Delta State, Vanderbilt, and SMU before joining LSU as an assistant coach.

=== LSU ===
Redus was named an assistant coach at LSU on April 20, 2022. Redus was credited as the program's lead recruiter, bringing in talent such as Angel Reese, Hailey Van Lith, and Aneesah Morrow.

=== Rutgers ===
Redus was named the head coach at Rutgers on March 9, 2026. He signed a five-year contract worth $4 million.

== Head coaching record ==
Record table
Season	Team	Overall	Conference	Standing	Postseason
Rutgers Scarlet Knights (Big Ten Conference) (2026–present)
2026–27	Rutgers	0–0			
Rutgers:		0–0 (–)	0–0 (–)		
Total:		0–0 (–)			
National champion Postseason invitational champion Conference regular season champion Conference regular season and conference tournament champion Division regular season champion Division regular season and conference tournament champion Conference tournament champion

== Personal life ==
Redus and his wife have two children. His father Gary played 13 seasons of Major League Baseball (MLB).
