= Maristas Colegio Sagrado Corazón Valencia =

Coordinates: 39.46491°N 0.36306°W

- Salamanca, 45, 46005 Valencia, Spain

Information
- Type: Marist Brothers, Catholic
- Established: 1897; 129 years ago
- Grades: Preprimary through secondary
- Gender: Coeducational
- Publication: El Clarió
- Website: MaristaValencia

Maristas Colegio Sagrado Corazón Valencia (also Marist College Valencia and Sacred Heart College Valencia) was founded by the Marist Brothers in 1897 in Valencia, Spain. Students range from pre-primary through secondary.
