= Te'Yala Delfosse =

American basketball player

No. 33 – Michigan Wolverines
- Position: Guard
- Conference: Big Ten

Personal information
- Born: October 18, 2005 (age 21)
- Listed height: 6 ft 3 in (1.91 m)

Career information
- High school: Ewing (Ewing, New Jersey)
- College: Michigan (2024–present)

Te'Yala Rebecca Delfosse (born October 18, 2005) is an American college basketball player for Michigan Wolverines of the Big Ten Conference.

== Early life ==
Delfosse attended Ewing High School in Ewing, New Jersey. She finished her high school career with 1,610 points, 829 rebounds, 373 steals, 261 assists and 152 blocks. Following her senior year, she was named MCT MVP/All-Tournament Team, CJ3 MVP/All-Tournament Team, CVCBA First Team/CVCBA Player of the Year, NJ North/South All-Star Selection MVP, NJBCA All-County First Team, NJ.com Second Team All-State and NJ Athletics First Team All-State. On November 8, 2023, she signed her National Letter of Intent to play college basketball at the University of Michigan.

== College career ==
Delfosse began her career for Michigan during the 2024–25 season. In her freshman year she appeared in 24 games and averaged 3.4 points and 1.9 rebounds in 9.8 minutes per game off the bench, after missing time due to injury. She made her collegiate debut on November 24, 2024, against Long Beach State, and recorded ten points, five rebounds and two assists in ten minutes.

During the 2025–26 season, in her sophomore year, appeared in all 35 games with one start, and • averaged 8.7 points and 4.7 rebounds in 19.2 minutes per game. She recorded 16 double-figure scoring games, including one 20-point game. On November 23, 2025, during the Basketball Hall of Fame Women's Showcase against Syracuse, she scored a then career-high 21 points, and was subsequently named MVP. In their next game against Detroit Mercy on November 26, she recorded 14 points and 10 rebounds for her first career double-double.

During the 2026–27 season opener on November 5, 2026, against No. 2 UConn, she scored a career-high 22 points, a team-high nine rebounds, along with two assists, two steals and a block, in a 77–66 victory. The win marked Michigan's third over a top-five opponent in program history. The next game against Wright State she recorded 11 points, five rebounds, two assists, and a career-high three steals and four blocks. She was subsequently named Big Ten Player of the Week.
