= 2026–27 NCAA Division I women's basketball rankings =

- Season: 2026–27
- NCAA Tournament: 2027
- Preseason No. 1: South Carolina
NCAA Division I women's basketball rankings
← 2025–26

Two human polls make up the 2026–27 NCAA Division I women's basketball rankings, the AP Poll and the Coaches Poll, in addition to various publications' preseason polls.

== Legend ==
	Increase in ranking
	Decrease in ranking
	Not ranked previous week
Italics	Number of first place votes
(#–#)	Win-loss record
?	Tied with team above or below also with this symbol

== AP Poll ==
The women's basketball poll began during the 1976–77 season, and was initially compiled by Mel Greenberg and published by The Philadelphia Inquirer. At first, it was a poll of coaches conducted via telephone, where coaches identified top teams and a list of the Top 20 teams was produced. The contributors continued to be coaches until 1994, when the AP took over administration of the poll from Greenberg, and switched to a panel of writers.

	Preseason Oct 20	Week 1 Nov 9	Week 2 Nov 16	Week 3 Nov 23	Week 4 Nov 30	Week 5 Dec 7	Week 6 Dec 14	Week 7 Dec 21	Week 8 Dec 28	Week 9 Jan 4	Week 10 Jan 11	Week 11 Jan 18	Week 12 Jan 25	Week 13 Feb 1	Week 14 Feb 8	Week 15 Feb 15	Week 16 Feb 22	Week 17 Mar 1	Week 18 Mar 8	Week 19 Mar 15	Final Apr 5	
1.	South Carolina (23)	South Carolina (2–0) (32)	South Carolina (4–0) (33)																			1.
2.	UConn (6)	Michigan (2–0)	Michigan (3–0)																			2.
3.	USC (2)	USC (2–0) (1)	Louisville (6–0)																			3.
4.	Duke	UConn (2–1)	USC (3–1)																			4.
5.	Michigan	Duke (2–0)	Duke (4–0)																			5.
6.	Texas	Texas (2–0)	Texas (4–0)																			6.
7.	Louisville	Louisville (3–0)	UConn (3–2)																			7.
8.	Vanderbilt	Vanderbilt (2–0)	Iowa (4–1)																			8.
9.	LSU	LSU (2–0)	LSU (4–0)																			9.
10.	Iowa	UCLA (2–0)	UCLA (4–0)																			10.
11.	UCLA	Iowa (2–1)	Vanderbilt (4–1)																			11.
12.	North Carolina	Kentucky (3–0)	Kentucky (5–0)																			12.
13.	Notre Dame	Notre Dame (2–0)	Notre Dame (5–0)																			13.
14.	Kentucky	Oklahoma (2–0)	Oklahoma (5–0)																			14.
15.	TCU	TCU (3–0)	TCU (6–0)																			15.
16.	Washington	Washington (2–0)	Washington (3–0)																			16.
17.	Minnesota	Ohio State (3–0)	Minnesota (4–0)																			17.
18.	Ohio State	Minnesota (2–0)	Maryland (2–1)																			18.
19.	Ole Miss	Oklahoma State (2–0)	Ole Miss (4–0)																			19.
20.	Maryland	Maryland (1–1)	Ohio State (4–1)																			20.
21.	Oklahoma	Ole Miss (2–0)	Illinois (3–0)																			21.
22.	Oklahoma State	Illinois (2–0)	West Virginia (4–0)																			22.
23.	Illinois	North Carolina (0–2)	Nebraska (4–0)																			23.
24.	West Virginia	West Virginia (3–0)	North Carolina (2–2)																			24.
25.	NC State	Nebraska (2–0)	Oklahoma State (4–1)																			25.
	Preseason Oct 20	Week 1 Nov 9	Week 2 Nov 16	Week 3 Nov 23	Week 4 Nov 30	Week 5 Dec 7	Week 6 Dec 14	Week 7 Dec 21	Week 8 Dec 28	Week 9 Jan 4	Week 10 Jan 11	Week 11 Jan 18	Week 12 Jan 25	Week 13 Feb 1	Week 14 Feb 8	Week 15 Feb 15	Week 16 Feb 22	Week 17 Mar 1	Week 18 Mar 8	Week 19 Mar 15	Final Apr 5	
		Dropped: No. 25 NC State (2–1)	None	None	None	None	None	None	None	None	None	None	None	None	None	None	None	None	None	None	None	

== USA Today Coaches Poll ==
The Coaches Poll is the second oldest poll still in use after the AP Poll. It is compiled by a rotating group of 31 college Division I head coaches. The Poll operates by Borda count. Each voting member ranks teams from 1 to 25. Each team then receives points for their ranking in reverse order: Number 1 earns 25 points, number 2 earns 24 points, and so forth. The points are then combined and the team with the highest points is then ranked No. 1; second highest is ranked No. 2 and so forth. Only the top 25 teams with points are ranked, with teams receiving first place votes noted the quantity next to their name. The maximum points a single team can earn is 775.

	Preseason Oct 20	Week 1 Nov 10	Week 2 Nov 17	Week 3 Nov 24	Week 4 Dec 1	Week 5 Dec 8	Week 6 Dec 15	Week 7 Dec 22	Week 8 Dec 29	Week 9 Jan 5	Week 10 Jan 12	Week 11 Jan 18	Week 12 Jan 25	Week 13 Feb 1	Week 14 Feb 8	Week 15 Feb 15	Week 16 Feb 22	Week 17 Mar 1	Week 18 Mar 8	Week 19 Mar 15	Final Apr 6	
1.	South Carolina (26)	South Carolina (2–0) (32)																				1.
2.	UConn (6)	Michigan (2–0)																				2.
3.	USC	USC (2–0)																				3.
4.	Duke	UConn (2–1)																				4.
5.	Michigan	Duke (2–0)																				5.
6.	Texas	Texas (2–0)																				6.
7.	Louisville	Louisville (3–0)																				7.
8.	LSU	Vanderbilt (2–0)																				8.
9.	Vanderbilt	LSU (2–0)																				9.
10.	Iowa	Kentucky (3–0)																				10.
11.	North Carolina	Notre Dame (2–0)																				11.
12.	UCLA	UCLA (2–0)																				12.
13.	Notre Dame	Iowa (2–1)																				13.
14.	Kentucky	Oklahoma (2–0)																				14.
15.	Washington	TCU (3–0)																				15.
16.	TCU	Washington (2–0)																				16.
17.	Maryland	Minnesota (2–0)																				17.
18.	Minnesota	Maryland (1–1)																				18.
19.	Oklahoma State	Ohio State (3–0)																				19.
20.	Ohio State	Oklahoma State (2–0)																				20.
21.	Oklahoma	Illinois (2–0)																				21.
22.	Illinois	West Virginia (3–0)																				22.
23.	Ole Miss	North Carolina (0–2)																				23.
24.	West Virginia	Ole Miss (2–0)																				24.
25.	NC State	Nebraska (2–0)																				25.
	Preseason Oct 20	Week 1 Nov 10	Week 2 Nov 17	Week 3 Nov 24	Week 4 Dec 1	Week 5 Dec 8	Week 6 Dec 15	Week 7 Dec 22	Week 8 Dec 29	Week 9 Jan 5	Week 10 Jan 12	Week 11 Jan 18	Week 12 Jan 25	Week 13 Feb 1	Week 14 Feb 8	Week 15 Feb 15	Week 16 Feb 22	Week 17 Mar 1	Week 18 Mar 8	Week 19 Mar 15	Final Apr 6	
		Dropped: No. 25 NC State (2–1)	None	None	None	None	None	None	None	None	None	None	None	None	None	None	None	None	None	None	None	

== See also ==
- 2026–27 NCAA Division I men's basketball rankings
