= 2026–27 Indiana Hoosiers women's basketball team =

American college basketball season

2026–27 Indiana Hoosiers women's basketball
- Conference: Big Ten Conference
- Record: 7–0 (0–0 Big Ten)
- Head coach: Teri Moren (13th season)
- Associate head coach: Rhet Wierzba
- Assistant coaches: Paul Miller; Ali Patberg; Colsten Thompson; Keyanna Warthen; Fred Williams
- Home arena: Simon Skjodt Assembly Hall

2026–27 Big Ten women's basketball standings
	Conf.				Overall
Team	W		L	PCT	W		L	PCT
Rutgers	0	–	0	–	7	–	0	1.000
Indiana	0	–	0	–	6	–	0	1.000
No. 2 Michigan	0	–	0	–	5	–	0	1.000
Michigan State	0	–	0	–	5	–	0	1.000
No. 17 Minnesota	0	–	0	–	5	–	0	1.000
No. 23 Nebraska	0	–	0	–	5	–	0	1.000
No. 10 UCLA	0	–	0	–	5	–	0	1.000
No. 16 Washington	0	–	0	–	5	–	0	1.000
No. 21 Illinois	0	–	0	–	4	–	0	1.000
Oregon	0	–	0	–	6	–	1	.857
No. 8 Iowa	0	–	0	–	5	–	1	.833
No. 19т Ohio State	0	–	0	–	5	–	1	.833
Wisconsin	0	–	0	–	5	–	1	.833
No. 18 Maryland	0	–	0	–	4	–	1	.800
No. 4 USC	0	–	0	–	4	–	1	.800
Purdue	0	–	0	–	4	–	2	.667
Northwestern	0	–	0	–	3	–	4	.429
Penn State	0	–	0	–	1	–	4	.200
† 2027 Big Ten tournament winner As of November 22, 2026; Rankings from AP poll

The 2026–27 Indiana Hoosiers women's basketball team represents the Indiana University Bloomington during the 2026–27 NCAA Division I women's basketball season. The Hoosiers, led by head coach Teri Moren in her 13th season, play their home games at Simon Skjodt Assembly Hall as a member of the Big Ten Conference.

== Previous season ==
The Hoosiers finished the 2025–26 season 18–14 overall and 6–12 in Big Ten play, to finish thirteenth in the conference. As the No. 13 seed in the Big Ten tournament, they erased a 20-point deficit, the biggest comeback in program history under Teri Moren, to defeat No. 12 Nebraska 72–69 in the first round. They were then eliminated in the second round 83–59 to No. 5 Ohio State to end their season.

Following the season, the Hoosiers later declined a bid to the WNIT, marking the first season since 2020 where they did not participate in a post-season tournament.

== Offseason ==
=== Departures ===
Indiana Departures
Name	Num	Pos.	Height	Year	Hometown	Reason for Departure
Phoenix Stotjin	1	Guard	5'9"	Sophomore	Amsterdam, Netherlands	Transferred to Auburn
Neveah Caffey	2	Guard	5'10"	Freshman	Warrenton, Missouri	Transferred to Missouri
Jerni Kiaku	7	Guard	5'7"	Senior	Garner, North Carolina	Graduated
Edessa Noyan	8	Forward	6'3"	Junior	Botkyrka, Sweden	Transferred to Nebraska
Shay Ciezki	10	Guard	5'7"	Senior	Buffalo, New York	Graduated; went undrafted in the 2026 WNBA draft, signed training camp contract with the Phoenix Mercury
Valentyna Kadlecova	15	Guard	6'0"	Sophomore	Kadaň, Czech Republic	Left team in December 2025
Chloe Spreen	22	Guard	5'10"	Sophomore	Bedford, Indiana	Transferred to Illinois State
Faith Wiseman	31	Forward	6'4"	Sophomore	Martinsville, Indiana	Transferred to Western Michigan
Jade Ondineme	45	Forward	6'3"	Junior	Orleans, France	Transferred to Miami (OH)

=== Incoming transfers ===
Indiana incoming transfers
Name	Num	Pos.	Height	Year	Hometown	Previous School
Malia Samuels	0	Guard	5'7"	Senior	Seattle, Washington	USC
Ashlyn Anderson	8	Forward	6'3"	Junior	Latchford, Ontario	Fanshawe (OCAA)
Jess Petrie	12	Forward	6'2"	Senior	Gold Coast, Australia	Nebraska
Alisa Williams	15	Forward	6'2"	Graduate Student	Denton, Texas	Iowa State
Kenzie Hare	22	Guard	5'9"	Senior	Bartlett, Illinois	Iowa State

=== Recruiting class ===
College recruiting
Name	Hometown	School	Height	Weight	Commit date
Addison Nyemcheck; W	Oceanport, New Jersey	Red Bank Catholic High School	6 ft 1 in (1.85 m)	N/A	
Addison Nyemcheck; W	Recruit ratings: Rivals: 247Sports: ESPN: (95)				
GiGi Battle; G	Edison, New Jersey	DME Academy	6 ft 0 in (1.83 m)	N/A	
GiGi Battle; G	Recruit ratings: Rivals: 247Sports: ESPN: (95)				
Ashlinn James; G	Louisville, Kentucky	Assumption High School	5 ft 8 in (1.73 m)	N/A	
Ashlinn James; G	Recruit ratings: Rivals: 247Sports: ESPN: (93)				
Zoe Jackson; C	Oakville, Australia	Arndell Anglican College	5 ft 8 in (1.73 m)	N/A	
Zoe Jackson; C	Recruit ratings: Rivals:				
Overall recruit ranking: ESPN: 8
Note: In many cases, Scout, Rivals, 247Sports, On3, and ESPN may conflict in their listings of height and weight.; In these cases, the average was taken. ESPN grades are on a 100-point scale.; Sources: "2026 Player Commits". ESPN. Archived from the original on July 26, 2026.

== Roster ==
2026–27 Indiana Hoosiers women's basketball team
Players
Coaches

Pos.	#	Name	Height	Year	Previous school	Hometown
G	0	Malia Samuels	5 ft 7 in (1.7 m)	Sr	Garfield High School; USC	Seattle, Washington
F	3	Maya Makalusky	6 ft 3 in (1.91 m)	So	Hamilton Southeastern High School	Fishers, Indiana
F	4	Sydney Fenn	6 ft 3 in (1.91 m)	RS So	AZ Compass Prep	Buffalo, New York
G	5	Lenée Beaumont	6 ft 1 in (1.85 m)	RS Jr	Benet Academy	Lisle, Illinois
F	8	Ashlyn Anderson	6 ft 3 in (1.91 m)	Jr	Timiskaming District Secondary School; Fanshawe	Latchford, Ontario
G	10	Camille Pangonis	5 ft 11 in (1.8 m)	Fr	Fort Erie International Academy	Burlington, Ontario
F	12	Jess Petrie	6 ft 2 in (1.88 m)	Sr	UC Senior Secondary College Lake Ginninderra; Nebraska	Gold Coast, Australia
G	13	Ashlinn James	5 ft 8 in (1.73 m)	Fr	Assumption High School	Louisville, Kentucky
F	15	Alisa Williams	6 ft 2 in (1.88 m)	GS	Braswell High School; Iowa State	Denton, Texas
G	22	Kenzie Hare	5 ft 9 in (1.75 m)	Sr	Naperville North High School; Iowa State	Bartlett, Illinois
F	23	Zania Socka-Nguemen	6 ft 3 in (1.91 m)	Jr	Sidwell Friends School; UCLA	Silver Spring, Maryland
G	24	GiGi Battle	6 ft 0 in (1.83 m)	Fr	DME Academy	Edison, New Jersey
F	30	Zoe Jackson	6 ft 4 in (1.93 m)	Fr	Arndell Anglican College	Oakville, Australia
F	55	Addy Nyemcheck	6 ft 2 in (1.88 m)	Fr	Red Bank Catholic High School	Oceanport, New Jersey

Head coach

- Teri Moren (Purdue)

Assistant coach(es)

- Rhet Wierzba (Austin Peay)
- Paul Miller (Lake Forest)
- Ali Patberg (Indiana)
- Colsten Thompson (Alabama–Huntsville)
- Keyanna Warthen (SMU)
- Fred Williams (Boise State)

Legend

- (C) Team captain
- (S) Suspended
- (I) Ineligible
- (W) Walk-on
- Injured
- Current redshirt

Roster
Last update: July 26, 2026

== Schedule and results ==
Date time, TV	Rank^{#}	Opponent^{#}	Result	Record	High points	High rebounds	High assists	Site (attendance) city, state
Non-conference regular season
October 28, 2026*; 7:00 p.m., B1G+		Marian	W 87–59		18 – Hare	9 – Socka-Nguemen	8 – Tied	Simon Skjodt Assembly Hall (2,537); Bloomington, IN
Non-conference regular season
November 3, 2026*; 7:00 p.m., B1G+		Florida Gulf Coast	W 79–50	1–0	13 – Socka-Nguemen	7 – Socka-Nguemen	5 – Samuels	Simon Skjodt Assembly Hall (5,921); Bloomington, IN
November 6, 2026*; 7:00 p.m., B1G+		Southern Illinois	W 96–55	2–0	14 – Beaumont	12 – Socka-Nguemen	5 – Samuels	Simon Skjodt Assembly Hall (6,127); Bloomington, IN
November 9, 2026*; 7:00 p.m., B1G+		Bradley	W 84–56	3–0	16 – Makalusky	9 – Petrie	5 – Samuels	Simon Skjodt Assembly Hall (5,966); Bloomington, IN
November 13, 2026*; 7:00 p.m., B1G+		Samford	W 80–44	4–0	17 – Socka-Nguemen	10 – Socka-Nguemen	3 – Makalusky	Simon Skjodt Assembly Hall (6,225); Bloomington, IN
November 15, 2026*; 2:00 p.m., B1G+		Milwaukee	W 85–47	5–0	16 – Socka-Nguemen	17 – Nyemchek	7 – Samuels	Simon Skjodt Assembly Hall (6,035); Bloomington, IN
November 18, 2026*; 7:00 p.m., B1G+		Coastal Carolina	W 90–65	6–0	21 – Hare	10 – Socka-Nguemen	11 – Samuels	Simon Skjodt Assembly Hall (5,976); Bloomington, IN
November 22, 2026*; 2:00 p.m., B1G+		Southern Indiana	W 68–59	7–0	21 – Nyemchek	12 – Socka-Nguemen	5 – Hare	Simon Skjodt Assembly Hall (6,328); Bloomington, IN
November 27, 2026*; 11:30 a.m., Ion		vs. Mississippi State; Fort Myers Tip-Off Shell Division						Suncoast Credit Union Arena; Fort Myers, FL
November 28, 2026*; 1:30 p.m., Ion		vs. Georgia Tech; Fort Myers Tip-Off Shell Division						Suncoast Credit Union Arena; Fort Myers, FL
December 2, 2026*; 7:00 p.m., B1G+		Boston College						Simon Skjodt Assembly Hall; Bloomington, IN
December 5, 2026; 2:00 p.m., BTN		at Northwestern						Welsh–Ryan Arena; Evanston, IL
December 9, 2026*; 7:00 p.m., B1G+		Northern Kentucky						Simon Skjodt Assembly Hall; Bloomington, IN
December 13, 2026*; 2:00 p.m., B1G+		Illinois State						Simon Skjodt Assembly Hall; Bloomington, IN
December 20, 2026*; 1:00 p.m., B1G+		Florida State						Simon Skjodt Assembly Hall; Bloomington, IN
December 29, 2026; 7:00 p.m., B1G+		Rutgers						Simon Skjodt Assembly Hall; Bloomington, IN
January 2, 2027; 6:00 p.m., BTN		at Minnesota						The Barn; Minneapolis, MN
January 5, 2027; 7:00 p.m., B1G+		Maryland						Simon Skjodt Assembly Hall; Bloomington, IN
January 8, 2027; 6:00 p.m., Peacock/NBCSN		UCLA						Simon Skjodt Assembly Hall; Bloomington, IN
January 12, 2027; 6:00 p.m., B1G+		at Penn State						Rec Hall; State College, PA
January 17, 2027; 6:00 p.m., BTN		at Iowa						Carver–Hawkeye Arena; Iowa City, IA
January 24, 2027; 2:00 p.m., B1G+		at Michigan State						Breslin Center; East Lansing, MI
January 27, 2027; 7:00 p.m., Peacock/NBCSN		USC						Simon Skjodt Assembly Hall; Bloomington, IN
January 31, 2027; 2:00 p.m., B1G+		Purdue; Rivalry/Indiana National Guard Governor's Cup						Simon Skjodt Assembly Hall; Bloomington, IN
February 3, 2027; 7:00 p.m., B1G+		Ohio State						Simon Skjodt Assembly Hall; Bloomington, IN
February 7, 2027; 6:00 p.m., BTN		at Washington						Alaska Airlines Arena; Seattle, WA
February 10, 2027; 10:00 p.m., B1G+		at Oregon						Matthew Knight Arena; Eugene, OR
February 14, 2027; 2:00 p.m., B1G+		Wisconsin						Simon Skjodt Assembly Hall; Bloomington, IN
February 17, 2027; 7:00 p.m., B1G+		at Purdue; Rivalry/Indiana National Guard Governor's Cup						Mackey Arena; West Lafayette, IN
February 21, 2027; 2:00 p.m., FS1		Illinois						Simon Skjodt Assembly Hall; Bloomington, IN
February 24, 2027; 6:30 p.m., Peacock/NBCSN		at Michigan						Crisler Center; Ann Arbor, MI
February 27, 2027; 12:00 p.m., BTN		Nebraska						Simon Skjodt Assembly Hall; Bloomington, IN
*Non-conference game. ^{#}Rankings from AP Poll. (#) Tournament seedings in parentheses. All times are in Eastern.
