= 2026–27 USC Trojans women's basketball team =

American college basketball season

2026–27 USC Trojans women's basketball
- Conference: Big Ten Conference

Ranking
- Coaches: No. 5
- AP: No. 4
- Record: 4–1 (0–0 Big Ten)
- Head coach: Lindsay Gottlieb (6th season)
- Associate head coach: Beth Burns
- Assistant coaches: Willnett Crockett; Nikki Blue; Courtney Jaco; Jonathan Yim
- Home arena: Galen Center

2026–27 Big Ten women's basketball standings
	Conf.				Overall
Team	W		L	PCT	W		L	PCT
Indiana	0	–	0	–	6	–	0	1.000
Rutgers	0	–	0	–	6	–	0	1.000
No. 2 Michigan	0	–	0	–	5	–	0	1.000
Michigan State	0	–	0	–	5	–	0	1.000
No. 17 Minnesota	0	–	0	–	5	–	0	1.000
No. 23 Nebraska	0	–	0	–	5	–	0	1.000
No. 10 UCLA	0	–	0	–	5	–	0	1.000
No. 21 Illinois	0	–	0	–	4	–	0	1.000
No. 16 Washington	0	–	0	–	4	–	0	1.000
Oregon	0	–	0	–	6	–	1	.857
No. 8 Iowa	0	–	0	–	5	–	1	.833
No. 19т Ohio State	0	–	0	–	5	–	1	.833
Wisconsin	0	–	0	–	5	–	1	.833
Purdue	0	–	0	–	4	–	1	.800
No. 18 Maryland	0	–	0	–	3	–	1	.750
No. 4 USC	0	–	0	–	3	–	1	.750
Northwestern	0	–	0	–	2	–	4	.333
Penn State	0	–	0	–	1	–	4	.200
† 2027 Big Ten tournament winner As of November 21, 2026; Rankings from AP poll

The 2026–27 USC Trojans women's basketball team currently represents the University of Southern California during the 2026–27 NCAA Division I women's basketball season. The Trojans, led by fifth-year head coach Lindsay Gottlieb, play their home games at the Galen Center in Los Angeles, California, and compete as a member of the Big Ten Conference

== Previous season ==
The Trojans finished the 2025–26 season 18–14 overall and 9–9 in Big Ten play, to finish in a tie for ninth in the conference with Illinois. As the No. 9 seed in the Big Ten tournament, they lost in the second round to No. 8 Washington.

Following their elimination, the Trojans earned an at-large bid to the NCAA tournament, where they were seeded No. 8 in the Sacramento #4 Regional. They narrowly defeated No. 8 Clemson 71–67 in overtime in the first round, before falling to top-seeded South Carolina 61–101 in their rematch game.

== Offseason ==
=== Departures ===
USC Departures
Name	Num	Pos.	Height	Year	Hometown	Reason for Departure
Vivian Iwuchukwu	0	Forward	6'3"	Sophomore	Imo State, Nigeria	Transferred to Florida
Londynn Jones	3	Guard	5'4"	Senior	Riverside, CA	Graduated
Yakiya Milton	7	Forward	6'5"	Junior	Jacksonville, FL	Transferred to Clemson
Gerda Raulušaityte	8	Forward	6'3"	Junior	Varena, Lithuania	Transferred to Arizona
Malia Samuels	10	Guard	5'6"	Junior	Seattle, WA	Transferred to Indiana
Dayana Mendes	13	Guard-Forward	6'3"	Sophomore	Paris, France	Transferred to Miami (FL)
Kara Dunn	25	Guard	5'11"	Senior	Dallas, GA	Graduated; went undrafted in the 2026 WNBA draft, signed a training camp contract with the Phoenix Mercury

=== Incoming transfers ===
USC incoming transfers
Name	Num	Pos.	Height	Year	Hometown	Previous School
Pania Davis	3	Center	6'6"	Senior	Perth, Australia	Florida State
Ryann Bennett	10	Guard	5'8"	Junior	Long Beach, CA	UC Davis

=== Recruiting class ===
College recruiting
Name	Hometown	School	Height	Weight	Commit date
Saniyah Hall; G/F	Lorain, OH	SPIRE Academy	6 ft 1 in (1.85 m)	N/A	
Saniyah Hall; G/F	Recruit ratings: Rivals: 247Sports: ESPN: (98)				
Sara Okeke; F/C	Madrid, Spain	DME Academy	6 ft 4 in (1.93 m)	N/A	
Sara Okeke; F/C	Recruit ratings: Rivals: 247Sports: ESPN: (98)				
Overall recruit ranking: ESPN: 1
Note: In many cases, Scout, Rivals, 247Sports, On3, and ESPN may conflict in their listings of height and weight.; In these cases, the average was taken. ESPN grades are on a 100-point scale.; Sources: "2026 Player Commits". ESPN. Archived from the original on July 27, 2026.

== Roster ==
2026–27 USC Trojans women's basketball team
Players
Coaches

Pos.	#	Name	Height	Year	Previous school	Hometown
F	1	Sitaya Fagan	6 ft 4 in (1.93 m)	Fr	Melbourne Centre of Excellence	Melbourne, Australia
G/F	2	Saniyah Hall	6 ft 1 in (1.85 m)	Fr	SPIRE Academy	Lorain, OH
C	3	Pania Davis	6 ft 6 in (1.98 m)	Sr	Florida State	Perth, Australia
G	4	Rian Forestier	5 ft 11 in (1.8 m)	Jr	Louis D. Brandeis High School	Helotes, TX
F	6	Laura Williams	6 ft 1 in (1.85 m)	RS So	Paul VI Catholic High School	Tampa, FL
G	9	Jazzy Davidson	6 ft 1 in (1.85 m)	So	Clackamas High School	Clackamas, OR
G	10	Ryann Bennett	5 ft 8 in (1.73 m)	Jr	St. Anthony High School; UC Davis	Long Beach, CA
G	11	Kennedy Smith (C)	6 ft 1 in (1.85 m)	Jr	Etiwanda High School	Chino, CA
G	12	JuJu Watkins (C)	6 ft 2 in (1.88 m)	Sr	Sierra Canyon School	Los Angeles, CA
G	13	Alesia Talkouskaya	6 ft 0 in (1.83 m)	Fr		Smorgon, Belarus
F/C	17	Sara Okeke	6 ft 4 in (1.93 m)	Fr	DME Academy	Madrid, Spain
G	24	Brooklyn Shamblin (C)	5 ft 9 in (1.75 m)	Jr	Oaks Christian High School	Carpinteria, CA

Head coach

- Lindsay Gottlieb (Brown)

Assistant coach(es)

- Beth Burns (Ohio Wesleyan)
- Wilnett Crockett (Connecticut)
- Nikki Blue (UCLA)
- Courtney Jaco (USC)
- Jonathan Yim (Cal State Fullerton)

Legend

- (C) Team captain
- (S) Suspended
- (I) Ineligible
- (W) Walk-on
- Injured
- Current redshirt

Roster
Last update: July 27, 2026

== Schedule and results ==
Date time, TV	Rank^{#}	Opponent^{#}	Result	Record	High points	High rebounds	High assists	Site (attendance) city, state
Exhibition
October 25, 2026*; 2:00 p.m., B1G+	No. 3	California; First Look Exhibition	W 78–76		23 – Hall	6 – Tied	7 – Davidson	Galen Center (4,748); Los Angeles, CA
Regular season
November 2, 2026*; 1:00 p.m., CBSSN	No. 3	vs. UNLV; Naismith Hall of Fame Series	W 100–68	1–0	23 – Davidson	7 – Hall	4 – Davidson	T-Mobile Arena (2,031); Paradise, NV
November 8, 2026*; 5:00 p.m., BTN	No. 3	Utah State	W 118–40	2–0	32 – Watkins	16 – Watkins	6 – Tied	Galen Center (7,807); Los Angeles, CA
November 10, 2026*; 7:30 p.m., BTN	No. 3	Charleston	W 105–44	3–0	24 – Tied	9 – Fagan	6 – Watkins	Galen Center (3,870); Los Angeles, CA
November 15, 2026*; 10:00 a.m., ABC	No. 3	vs. No. 1 South Carolina; The Real SC	L 85–89	3–1	25 – Watkins	9 – Hall	5 – Smith	Bon Secours Wellness Arena; Greenville, SC
November 20, 2026*; 8:00 p.m., BTN	No. 4	vs. Baylor; Hollywood Hardwood Classic	W 78–69	4–1	36 – Watkins	12 – Watkins	5 – Davidson	Intuit Dome (3,390); Inglewood, CA
November 23, 2026*; 7:00 p.m., B1G+		Northern Arizona						Galen Center; Los Angeles, CA
November 27, 2026*; 10:30 a.m., BDG Live		vs. Saint Joseph's; Baha Mar Hoops Nassau Championship						Baha Mar Convention Center; Nassau, Bahamas
November 29, 2026*; 10:30 a.m., BDG Live		vs. Iowa State; Baha Mar Hoops Nassau Championship						Baha Mar Convention Center; Nassau, Bahamas
December 5, 2026; 3:00 p.m., Peacock/NBCSN		at Washington						Alaska Airlines Arena; Seattle, WA
December 8, 2026*; 7:00 p.m., B1G+		Grambling State						Galen Center; Los Angeles, CA
December 13, 2026*; 2:00 p.m., B1G+		Youngstown State						Galen Center; Los Angeles, CA
December 16, 2026*; 6:30 p.m., ION		vs. Miami (FL); Scripps Sports Women's Basketball Showcase						Mortgage Matchup Center; Phoenix, AZ
December 19, 2026*; 8:00 p.m., ESPN		vs. Notre Dame; Players Era Women's Festival						Michelob Ultra Arena; Paradise, NV
December 20, 2026*; 7:00 p.m., ESPN		vs. Duke; Players Era Women's Festival						Michelob Ultra Arena; Paradise, NV
December 29, 2026; 12:00 p.m., Peacock/NBCSN		at Wisconsin						Kohl Center; Madison, WI
January 2, 2027; 2:00 p.m., B1G+		Northwestern						Galen Center; Los Angeles, CA
January 5, 2027; 7:00 p.m., BTN		Nebraska						Galen Center; Los Angeles, CA
January 8, 2027; 5:00 p.m., Peacock/NBCSN		at Maryland						Xfinity Center; College Park, MD
January 11, 2027; 4:00 p.m., BTN		at Rutgers						Jersey Mike's Arena; Piscataway, NJ
January 15, 2027; 7:00 p.m., B1G+		Minnesota						Galen Center; Los Angeles, CA
January 18, 2027; 1:00 p.m., BTN		Penn State						Galen Center; Los Angeles, CA
January 24, 2027; 9:00 a.m., B1G+		at Purdue						Mackey Arena; West Lafayette, IN
January 27, 2027; 4:00 p.m., Peacock/NBCSN		at Indiana						Simon Skjodt Assembly Hall; Bloomington, IN
January 30, 2027; 2:30 p.m., FOX		Michigan						Galen Center; Los Angeles, CA
February 2, 2027; 7:00 p.m., Peacock/NBCSN		Illinois						Galen Center; Los Angeles, CA
February 7, 2027; 5:00 p.m., FOX		at UCLA; Rivalry						Pauley Pavilion; Los Angeles, CA
February 11, 2027; 4:00 p.m., FS1		at Iowa						Carver–Hawkeye Arena; Iowa City, IA
February 18, 2027; 7:00 p.m., Peacock/NBCSN		Michigan State						Galen Center; Los Angeles, CA
February 21, 2027; 1:00 p.m., NBC		Ohio State						Galen Center; Los Angeles, CA
February 25, 2027; 6:30 p.m., Peacock/NBCSN		UCLA; Rivalry						Galen Center; Los Angeles, CA
February 28, 2027; 1:00 p.m., BTN		at Oregon						Matthew Knight Arena; Eugene, OR
*Non-conference game. ^{#}Rankings from AP Poll. (#) Tournament seedings in parentheses. All times are in Pacific.

== Rankings ==
Ranking movements Legend: ██ Increase in ranking ██ Decrease in ranking ( ) = First-place votes
	Week																				
Poll	Pre	1	2	3	4	5	6	7	8	9	10	11	12	13	14	15	16	17	18	19	Final
AP	3 (2)	3 (1)	4																		
Coaches	3	3	5																		
