= 2026–27 Penn State Lady Lions basketball team =

American college basketball season

2026–27 Penn State Lady Lions basketball
- Conference: Big Ten Conference
- Record: 1–4 (0–0 Big Ten)
- Head coach: Tanisha Wright (1st season)
- Assistant coaches: Kelly Mazzante; Danielle Edwards; Oliver Cadet; Octavia Blue
- Home arena: Bryce Jordan Center

2026–27 Big Ten women's basketball standings
	Conf.				Overall
Team	W		L	PCT	W		L	PCT
Indiana	0	–	0	–	6	–	0	1.000
No. 2 Michigan	0	–	0	–	5	–	0	1.000
No. 17 Minnesota	0	–	0	–	5	–	0	1.000
No. 23 Nebraska	0	–	0	–	5	–	0	1.000
Rutgers	0	–	0	–	5	–	0	1.000
No. 21 Illinois	0	–	0	–	4	–	0	1.000
Michigan State	0	–	0	–	4	–	0	1.000
Purdue	0	–	0	–	4	–	0	1.000
No. 10 UCLA	0	–	0	–	4	–	0	1.000
No. 16 Washington	0	–	0	–	4	–	0	1.000
No. 19т Ohio State	0	–	0	–	5	–	1	.833
Oregon	0	–	0	–	5	–	1	.833
Wisconsin	0	–	0	–	5	–	1	.833
No. 8 Iowa	0	–	0	–	4	–	1	.800
No. 18 Maryland	0	–	0	–	3	–	1	.750
No. 4 USC	0	–	0	–	3	–	1	.750
Northwestern	0	–	0	–	2	–	4	.333
Penn State	0	–	0	–	0	–	4	.000
† 2027 Big Ten tournament winner As of November 19, 2026; Rankings from AP poll

The 2026–27 Penn State Lady Lions basketball team currently represents Pennsylvania State University during the 2026–27 NCAA Division I women's basketball season. The Lady Lions, led by first-year head coach Tanisha Wright, play their home games at the Bryce Jordan Center in State College, Pennsylvania and compete as a member of the Big Ten Conference.

== Previous season ==
The Lady Lions finished the 2025–26 season 11–18 overall and 4–14 in Big Ten play, to finish sixteenth in the conference. They failed to qualify for the Big Ten tournament for the second straight season.

On March 5, 2026, a week after the conclusion of the season, vice athletics director Dr. Patrick Kraft announced that head coach Carolyn Kieger had been fired after seven seasons with the program, in which she posted an 84–123 record. Following Kieger's firing, all ten remaining scholarship players entered the transfer portal. Four-star 2026 recruit Chikae Desdunes also decommitted from the program and re-opened her recruitment on March 24.

Two weeks later, on March 19, Kraft announced that Chicago Sky assistant coach and Penn State women's basketball alumna Tanisha Wright had been hired as the program's new head coach.

== Offseason ==
=== Departures ===
Penn State departures
Name	Num	Pos.	Height	Year	Hometown	Reason for departure
Shaelyn Steele	2	Guard	5'6"	Sophomore	Ashland, KY	Transferred to Tennessee
Moriah Murray	3	Guard	5'8"	(redshirt) Junior	Dunmore, PA	Transferred to Florida
Maggie Mendelson	4	Forward	6'5"	Senior	North Ogden, UT	Graduated, transferred to Pepperdine
Viktoria Ranisavljevic	7	Guard	5'7"	Freshman	Massagno, Switzerland	Transferred to UAB
Nyla McFadden	8	Guard-Forward	6'0"	Freshman	Fort Lauderdale, FL	Transferred to UCF
Amiya Evans	14	Forward	6'2"	Senior	Pensacola, FL	Graduated
Tèa Clèante	19	Guard	5'9"	Freshman	Dunkirk, France	Transferred to Kansas State
Kiyomi McMiller	23	Guard	5'8"	Sophomore	Silver Spring, MD	Transferred to Florida
Shayla Smith	24	Guard	5'9"	Freshman	Philadelphia, PA	Transferred to Temple
Rachel Okokoh	25	Forward	6'4"	Freshman	Montreal, QC	Transferred to Ole Miss
Gracie Merkle	44	Center	6'6"	(redshirt) Junior	Mount Washington, KY	Transferred to Minnesota

=== Incoming transfers ===
Penn State incoming transfers
Name	Num	Pos.	Height	Year	Hometown	Previous school
Devyn Quigley	0	Guard	5'10"	Junior	New Brunswick, NJ	NC State
Savannah White	2	Forward/Guard	6'2"	Graduate Student (Note: As part of an ongoing lawsuit challenging the new NCAA age-based eligibility model which excluded the class of 2022, White was granted an additional year of eligibility from a temporary restraining order filed in Ohio.)	St. Paul, MN	Xavier
Petra Bozan	4	Forward	6'4"	Junior	Split, Croatia	Nebraska
Ava Black	6	Guard	5'11"	Sophomore	Auburn, NH	Vanderbilt
Enjulina Gonzalez	11	Guard	5'9"	Graduate Student	Miami, FL	Georgia
Skylar Durley	12	Guard	5'8"	Sophomore	Oklahoma City, OK	Nevada
Cristen Carter	24	Forward	6'4"	Senior	Indianapolis, IN	Georgetown

=== Recruiting class ===
College recruiting
Name	Hometown	School	Height	Weight	Commit date
Kamrah Banks; G	Indianapolis, IN	Crispus Attucks High School	5 ft 9 in (1.75 m)	N/A	
Kamrah Banks; G	Recruit ratings: Rivals: 247Sports:				
Overall recruit ranking:
Note: In many cases, Scout, Rivals, 247Sports, On3, and ESPN may conflict in their listings of height and weight.; In these cases, the average was taken. ESPN grades are on a 100-point scale.; Sources:

== Roster ==
2026–27 Penn State Nittany Lions women's basketball team
Players
Coaches

Pos.	#	Name	Height	Year	Previous school	Hometown
G	0	Devyn Quigley	5 ft 10 in (1.78 m)	Jr	Manchester Township High School; NC State	New Brunswick, NJ
G/F	2	Savannah White	6 ft 2 in (1.88 m)	GS	DeLaSalle High School; Xavier	St. Paul, MN
G	3	Kamrah Banks	5 ft 9 in (1.75 m)	Fr	Crispus Attucks High School	Indianapolis, IN
F	4	Petra Bozan	6 ft 4 in (1.93 m)	Jr	Nebraska	Split, Croatia
G	5	Ashlee Brown	5 ft 10 in (1.78 m)	Fr	Valley High School	Des Moines, IA
G	6	Ava Black	5 ft 11 in (1.8 m)	So	Tabor Academy; Vanderbilt	Auburn, NH
F	9	Irene García	6 ft 1 in (1.85 m)	Fr	Segle XXI Academy	Urnieta, Basque County, Spain
G	10	Vitoria Santana	5 ft 8 in (1.73 m)	GS	E.E. Dr. Carlos de Campos; Eastern Arizona College	São Paulo, Brazil
G	11	Enjulina Gonzalez	5 ft 9 in (1.75 m)	GS	Miami Christian School; Georgia	Miami, FL
G	22	Skylar Durley	5 ft 8 in (1.73 m)	So	Edmond North High School; Nevada	Oklahoma City, OK
F	24	Cristen Carter	6 ft 4 in (1.93 m)	Sr	Ben Davis High School; Georgetown	Indianapolis, IN

Head coach

- Tanisha Wright (Penn State)

Assistant coach(es)

- Kelly Mazzante (Penn State)
- Danielle Edwards (Clemson)
- Olivier Cadet (Central Florida)
- Octavia Blue (Miami (FL))

Legend

- (C) Team captain
- (S) Suspended
- (I) Ineligible
- (W) Walk-on
- Injured
- Current redshirt

Roster
Last update: August 15, 2026

== Schedule and results ==
Date time, TV	Rank^{#}	Opponent^{#}	Result	Record	High points	High rebounds	High assists	Site (attendance) city, state
Exhibition
October 27, 2026*; 6:00 p.m., B1G+		Pitt-Johnstown	W 84–47		20 – Bozan	8 – Tied	6 – Gonzalez	Rec Hall (685); State College, PA
Regular season
November 2, 2026*; 5:00 p.m., B1G+		Cleveland State	L 61–62	0–1	17 – Black	10 – Black	8 – Carter	Bryce Jordan Center (1,887); State College, PA
November 7, 2026*; 2:00 p.m., ESPN+		at Cincinnati	L 53–76	0–2	19 – Quigley	12 – Carter	3 – Black	Fifth Third Arena (1,278); Cincinnati, OH
November 9, 2026*; 7:00 p.m., ESPN+		at Dayton	L 71–77	0–3	27 – Bozan	8 – Carter	4 – Tied	UD Arena (1,653); Dayton, OH
November 16, 2026*; 4:00 p.m., ESPN+		at Arizona State	L 41–85	0–4	8 – Tied	5 – García	2 – Tied	Desert Financial Arena (2,083); Tempe, AZ
November 19, 2026*; 11:00 a.m., B1G+		Bowling Green	W 72–70	1–4	20 – Gonzalez	9 – White	7 – Gonzalez	Rec Hall (2,977); State College, PA
November 22, 2026*; 11:00 a.m., B1G+		Saint Joseph's						Rec Hall; State College, PA
November 27, 2026*; 6:30 p.m., ESPN+		vs. Baylor; Paradise Jam Reef Division semifinal						UVI Sports and Fitness Center; Charlotte Amalie, USVI
November 28, 2026*; 6:30 or 9:00 p.m., ESPN+		vs. South Florida or Seton Hall; Paradise Jam Reef Division						UVI Sports and Fitness Center; Charlotte Amalie, USVI
December 2, 2026*; 6:00 p.m., B1G+		James Madison						Bryce Jordan Center; State College, PA
December 6, 2026; 4:00 p.m., BTN		at Michigan State						Breslin Center; East Lansing, MI
December 10, 2026*; 6:00 p.m., B1G+		Army						Bryce Jordan Center; State College, PA
December 13, 2026*; 3:00 p.m., ESPN+		at TCU						Schollmaier Arena; Fort Worth, TX
December 20, 2026*; 12:00 p.m., B1G+		Fordham						Rec Hall; State College, PA
December 29, 2026; 6:00 p.m., B1G+		Purdue						Rec Hall; State College, PA
January 1, 2027; 4:00 p.m., BTN		Oregon						Bryce Jordan Center; State College, PA
January 5, 2027; 8:00 p.m., B1G+		at Minnesota						The Barn; Minneapolis, MN
January 8, 2027; 6:00 p.m., B1G+		Rutgers						Bryce Jordan Center; State College, PA
January 12, 2027; 6:00 p.m., B1G+		Indiana						Rec Hall; State College, PA
January 15, 2027; 10:00 p.m., B1G+		at UCLA						Pauley Pavilion; Los Angeles, CA
January 18, 2027; 4:00 p.m., BTN		at USC						Galen Center; Los Angeles, CA
January 27, 2027; 7:00 p.m., B1G+		at Michigan						Crisler Center; Ann Arbor, MI
January 31, 2027; 1:00 p.m., B1G+		Ohio State						Rec Hall; State College, PA
February 4, 2027; 8:00 p.m., BTN		at Northwestern						Welsh–Ryan Arena; Evanston, IL
February 7, 2027; 1:00 p.m., B1G+		Maryland						Bryce Jordan Center; State College, PA
February 10, 2027; 7:00 p.m., B1G+		at Rutgers						Jersey Mike's Arena; Piscataway, NJ
February 13, 2027; 1:00 p.m., B1G+		Washington						Rec Hall; State College, PA
February 18, 2027; 6:00 p.m., BTN		Iowa						Bryce Jordan Center; State College, PA
February 21, 2027; 3:00 p.m., B1G+		at Nebraska						Pinnacle Bank Arena; Lincoln, NE
February 25, 2027; 8:30 p.m., BTN		at Illinois						State Farm Center; Champaign, IL
February 28, 2027; 1:00 p.m., B1G+		Wisconsin						Rec Hall; State College, PA
*Non-conference game. ^{#}Rankings from AP Poll. (#) Tournament seedings in parentheses. All times are in Eastern.
