= 2026–27 Oregon Ducks women's basketball team =

Intercollegiate basketball season

2026–27 Oregon Ducks women's basketball
- Conference: Big Ten Conference
- Record: 6–1 (0–0 Big Ten)
- Head coach: Kelly Graves (13th season)
- Associate head coach: Jodie Berry
- Assistant coaches: Tre Simmons; Lisa O'Meara; Oti Gildon
- Home arena: Matthew Knight Arena

2026–27 Big Ten women's basketball standings
	Conf.				Overall
Team	W		L	PCT	W		L	PCT
Indiana	0	–	0	–	6	–	0	1.000
No. 2 Michigan	0	–	0	–	5	–	0	1.000
No. 17 Minnesota	0	–	0	–	5	–	0	1.000
No. 23 Nebraska	0	–	0	–	5	–	0	1.000
Rutgers	0	–	0	–	5	–	0	1.000
No. 10 UCLA	0	–	0	–	5	–	0	1.000
No. 21 Illinois	0	–	0	–	4	–	0	1.000
Michigan State	0	–	0	–	4	–	0	1.000
Purdue	0	–	0	–	4	–	0	1.000
No. 16 Washington	0	–	0	–	4	–	0	1.000
No. 19т Ohio State	0	–	0	–	5	–	1	.833
Oregon	0	–	0	–	5	–	1	.833
Wisconsin	0	–	0	–	5	–	1	.833
No. 8 Iowa	0	–	0	–	4	–	1	.800
No. 18 Maryland	0	–	0	–	3	–	1	.750
No. 4 USC	0	–	0	–	3	–	1	.750
Northwestern	0	–	0	–	2	–	4	.333
Penn State	0	–	0	–	0	–	4	.000
† 2027 Big Ten tournament winner As of November 20, 2026; Rankings from AP poll

The 2026–27 Oregon Ducks women's basketball team currently represents University of Oregon during the 2026–27 NCAA Division I women's basketball season. The Ducks, led by thirteenth-year head coach Kelly Graves, play their home games at the Matthew Knight Arena in Eugene, Oregon and compete as a member of the Big Ten Conference.

== Previous season ==
The Ducks finished the 2025–26 season 23–13 overall and 8–10 in Big Ten play, to finish eleventh in the conference. As the No. 11 seed in the Big Ten women's tournament, they defeated No. 14 Purdue in the first round and upset No. 6 Maryland in the second round, before falling in the quarterfinals to No. 3 Michigan.

Following the Big Ten elimination, the Ducks received an at-large bid to the NCAA tournament, seeded No. 8 in the Fort Worth Regional #3. They defeated No. 9 Virginia Tech in the first round before falling to top-seeded Texas 58–100 in the second round.

== Offseason ==
=== Departures ===
Oregon departures
Name	Num	Pos.	Height	Year	Hometown	Reason for departure
Astera Tuhina	0	Guard	5'9"	Senior	Pristina, Kosovo	Graduated
Mia Jacobs	1	Forward	6'2"	Senior	Perth, Australia	Graduated
Amina Muhammad	5	Forward	6'4"	(redshirt) Senior	DeSoto, TX	Graduated
Elisa Mevius	8	Guard	5'10"	Senior	Rendsburg, Germany	Transferred to Green Bay
Sammie Wagner	11	Guard-forward	6'1"	(redshirt) Junior	San Antonio, TX	Transferred
Janiyah Williams	22	Guard	5'9"	Freshman	Edmond, OK	Transferred to Houston
Sarah Rambus	23	Forward	6'3"	Junior	Flint, MI	Transferred to Syracuse
Sara Barhoum	25	Guard	5'10"	Freshman	Clackamas, OR	Transferred to Portland State

=== Incoming transfers ===
Oregon incoming transfers
Name	Num	Pos.	Height	Year	Hometown	Previous school
Hilary Fuller	7	Forward	6'2"	Junior	Brisbane, Australia	Belmont

=== Recruiting class ===
College recruiting
Name	Hometown	School	Height	Weight	Commit date
Brooklynn Haywood; G	Anchorage, AK	Union High School	5 ft 9 in (1.75 m)	N/A	Dec 11, 2025
Brooklynn Haywood; G	Recruit ratings: Rivals: 247Sports: ESPN: (95)				
Emilia Krstevski; P	Torrance, CA	Sierra Canyon School	6 ft 4 in (1.93 m)	N/A	Dec 11, 2025
Emilia Krstevski; P	Recruit ratings: Rivals: 247Sports: ESPN: (94)				
KK Holman; PG	Fishers, IN	Hamilton Southeastern High School	5 ft 10 in (1.78 m)	N/A	Mar 4, 2026
KK Holman; PG	Recruit ratings: Rivals: 247Sports: ESPN: (93)				
Overall recruit ranking: ESPN: 14
Note: In many cases, Scout, Rivals, 247Sports, On3, and ESPN may conflict in their listings of height and weight.; In these cases, the average was taken. ESPN grades are on a 100-point scale.; Sources: "2026 Player Commits". ESPN. Archived from the original on July 18, 2026.

== Roster ==
2026–27 Oregon Ducks women's basketball team
Players
Coaches

Pos.	#	Name	Height	Year	Previous school	Hometown
G	0	La'u Pele Falatea	5 ft 9 in (1.75 m)	Fr	West High School	Salt Lake City, UT
C	1	Emilia Krstevski	6 ft 4 in (1.93 m)	Fr	Sierra Canyon School	Torrance, CA
G	2	Katie Fiso	5 ft 11 in (1.8 m)	Jr	Garfield High School	Seattle, WA
G	3	Sofia Bell	6 ft 0 in (1.83 m)	Sr	Jesuit High School	Portland, OR
F	4	Mallory Heyer	6 ft 1 in (1.85 m)	RS Sr	Chaska High School; Minnesota	Chaska, MN
F	7	Hilary Fuller	6 ft 2 in (1.88 m)	Jr	All Hallows' School; Belmont	Brisbane, Australia
G	9	Brooklynn Haywood	5 ft 9 in (1.75 m)	Fr	Union High School	Anchorage, AK
G	11	Kennedy Holman	5 ft 10 in (1.78 m)	Fr	Hamilton Southeastern High School	Fishers, IN
G	14	Ari Long	6 ft 0 in (1.83 m)	Sr	Valley View High School; Washington	Moreno Valley, CA
F	21	Filippa Tilliander	6 ft 1 in (1.85 m)	Sr	Norrköping Dolphins	Malmö, Sweden
F	35	Ehis Etute	6 ft 0 in (1.83 m)	Jr	T71 Dudelange	Dudelange, Luxembourg
G	42	Avary Cain	6 ft 1 in (1.85 m)	Jr	St. Joseph High School; UCLA	Santa Maria, CA

Head coach

- Kelly Graves (New Mexico)

Assistant coach(es)

- Jodie Berry (Western Washington)
- Tre Simmons (Washington)
- Lisa O'Meara (Saint Mary's)
- Oti Gildon (Oregon)

Legend

- (C) Team captain
- (S) Suspended
- (I) Ineligible
- (W) Walk-on
- Injured
- Current redshirt

Roster

== Schedule and results ==
Date time, TV	Rank^{#}	Opponent^{#}	Result	Record	High points	High rebounds	High assists	Site (attendance) city, state
Exhibition
October 20, 2026*; 6:00 p.m., B1G+		Bushnell	W 120–35		22 – Haywood	8 – Heyer	6 – Tied	Matthew Knight Arena (4,180); Eugene, OR
Regular season
November 2, 2026*; 3:00 p.m., B1G+		Hawaii	W 87–54	1–0	16 – Heyer	14 – Etute	9 – Fiso	Matthew Knight Arena (3,856); Eugene, OR
November 6, 2026*; 7:00 p.m., B1G+		Washington State	W 64–57	2–0	19 – Fiso	12 – Heyer	3 – Tied	Matthew Knight Arena (4,531); Eugene, OR
November 9, 2026*; 7:00 p.m., CBSSN		at Grand Canyon	L 74–81	2–1	19 – Long	13 – Etute	4 – Etute	Global Credit Union Arena (2,103); Phoenix, AZ
November 11, 2026*; 3:00 p.m., ESPN+		at Vermont	W 81–56	3–1	26 – Etute	10 – Etute	4 – Fiso	Patrick Gym (920); Burlington, VT
November 13, 2026*; 4:00 p.m., ESPN+		at Maine	W 79–72	4–1	32 – Fiso	6 – Etute	6 – Fiso	Memorial Gymnasium (1,507); Orono, ME
November 17, 2026*; 11:00 a.m., B1G+		Murray State	W 97–76	5–1	31 – Fiso	13 – Etute	3 – Fiso	Matthew Knight Arena (5,426); Eugene, OR
November 19, 2026*; 7:00 p.m., B1G+		Fairfield	W 96–75	6–1	27 – Fiso	10 – Etute	8 – Fiso	Matthew Knight Arena (3,995); Eugene, OR
November 26, 2026*; 8:00 a.m., FloSports		vs. Maryland Eastern Shore; Cancún Challenge Mayan Tournament						Hard Rock Hotel Riviera Maya; Cancún, Mexico
November 27, 2026*; 8:00 a.m., FloSports		vs. Colorado; Cancún Challenge Mayan Tournament						Hard Rock Hotel Riviera Maya; Cancún, Mexico
November 28, 2026*; 10:30 a.m., FloSports		vs. Georgia; Cancún Challenge Mayan Tournament						Hard Rock Hotel Riviera Maya; Cancún, Mexico
December 2, 2026*; 6:00 p.m., B1G+		Southern						Matthew Knight Arena; Eugene, OR
December 6, 2026; 3:00 p.m., BTN		UCLA						Matthew Knight Arena; Eugene, OR
December 13, 2026*; 1:00 p.m., The CW		at Oregon State; Rivalry						Gill Coliseum; Corvallis, OR
December 16, 2026*; 3:00 p.m., B1G+		Portland						Matthew Knight Arena; Eugene, OR
December 19, 2026*; 2:00 p.m., B1G+		Montana State						Matthew Knight Arena; Eugene, OR
December 29, 2026; 3:30 p.m., B1G+		at Ohio State						Value City Arena; Columbus, OH
January 1, 2027; 1:00 p.m., BTN		at Penn State						Bryce Jordan Center; State College, PA
January 5, 2027; 7:00 p.m., B1G+		Wisconsin						Matthew Knight Arena; Eugene, OR
January 10, 2027; 9:00 a.m., Peacock/NBCSN		at Michigan						Crisler Center; Ann Arbor, MI
January 13, 2027; 3:30 p.m., B1G+		at Michigan State						Breslin Center; East Lansing, MI
January 17, 2027; 2:00 p.m., B1G+		Maryland						Matthew Knight Arena; Eugene, OR
January 20, 2027; 7:00 p.m., B1G+		Purdue						Matthew Knight Arena; Eugene, OR
January 24, 2027; 3:00 p.m., BTN		Iowa						Matthew Knight Arena; Eugene, OR
January 28, 2027; 6:00 p.m., BTN		at Minnesota						The Barn; Minneapolis, MN
January 31, 2027; 11:00 a.m., BTN		at Nebraska						Pinnacle Bank Arena; Lincoln, NE
February 4, 2027; 7:00 p.m., BTN		Washington						Matthew Knight Arena; Eugene, OR
February 10, 2027; 7:00 p.m., B1G+		Indiana						Matthew Knight Arena; Eugene, OR
February 13, 2027; 12:00 p.m., B1G+		at Illinois						State Farm Center; Champaign, IL
February 16, 2027; 5:00 p.m., B1G+		at Northwestern						Welsh–Ryan Arena; Evanston, IL
February 20, 2027; 6:00 p.m., B1G+		Rutgers						Matthew Knight Arena; Eugene, OR
February 25, 2027; 7:30 p.m., BTN		at Washington						Alaska Airlines Arena; Seattle, WA
February 28, 2027; 1:00 p.m., BTN		USC						Matthew Knight Arena; Eugene, OR
*Non-conference game. ^{#}Rankings from AP Poll. (#) Tournament seedings in parentheses. All times are in Pacific.

== Rankings ==
Ranking movements Legend: RV = Received votes
	Week																				
Poll	Pre	1	2	3	4	5	6	7	8	9	10	11	12	13	14	15	16	17	18	19	Final
AP	RV																				
Coaches	RV																				
