= 2026–27 Iowa Hawkeyes women's basketball team =

Intercollegiate basketball season

2026–27 Iowa Hawkeyes women's basketball
- Conference: Big Ten Conference

Ranking
- Coaches: No. 10
- AP: No. 8
- Record: 5–1 (0–0 Big Ten)
- Head coach: Jan Jensen (3rd season)
- Assistant coaches: Abby Stamp; Randi Henderson; LaSondra Barrett; Jasmyn Walker
- Home arena: Carver–Hawkeye Arena

2026–27 Big Ten women's basketball standings
	Conf.				Overall
Team	W		L	PCT	W		L	PCT
Indiana	0	–	0	–	6	–	0	1.000
Rutgers	0	–	0	–	6	–	0	1.000
No. 2 Michigan	0	–	0	–	5	–	0	1.000
Michigan State	0	–	0	–	5	–	0	1.000
No. 17 Minnesota	0	–	0	–	5	–	0	1.000
No. 23 Nebraska	0	–	0	–	5	–	0	1.000
No. 10 UCLA	0	–	0	–	5	–	0	1.000
No. 21 Illinois	0	–	0	–	4	–	0	1.000
No. 16 Washington	0	–	0	–	4	–	0	1.000
Oregon	0	–	0	–	6	–	1	.857
No. 8 Iowa	0	–	0	–	5	–	1	.833
No. 19т Ohio State	0	–	0	–	5	–	1	.833
Wisconsin	0	–	0	–	5	–	1	.833
Purdue	0	–	0	–	4	–	1	.800
No. 18 Maryland	0	–	0	–	3	–	1	.750
No. 4 USC	0	–	0	–	3	–	1	.750
Northwestern	0	–	0	–	2	–	4	.333
Penn State	0	–	0	–	1	–	4	.200
† 2027 Big Ten tournament winner As of November 20, 2026; Rankings from AP poll

The 2026–27 Iowa Hawkeyes women's basketball team currently represents the University of Iowa during the 2026–27 NCAA Division I women's basketball season. The Hawkeyes, led by third year head coach Jan Jensen, play their home games at Carver–Hawkeye Arena and compete as a member of the Big Ten Conference.

== Previous season ==
The Hawkeyes finished the 2025–26 season 27–7 overall and 15–3 in Big Ten play, to finish second in the conference. As the No. 3 seed in the Big Ten tournament, they defeated No. 10 Illinois in the quarterfinals and No. 3 Michigan in the semifinals before falling to eventual NCAA tournament winners, top-seeded UCLA, in the championship game by a score of 96–45. The Hawkeyes' 51-point loss to the Bruins was the widest margin in Big Ten tournament history.

Following the Big Ten tournament, they received an at-large bid to the NCAA tournament as the No. 2 seed in the Sacramento Regional #4. They defeated No. 15 Fairleigh Dickinson in the first round, before suffering what would be the only official upset of the tournament when they were eliminated by No. 10 Virginia in double overtime in the second round.

== Offseason ==
=== Departures ===
Iowa Departures
Name	Num	Pos.	Height	Year	Hometown	Reason for Departure
Taylor McCabe	2	Guard	5'9"	Senior	Fremont, NE	Graduated
Kylie Feuerbach	4	Guard	6'0"	Graduate Student	Sycamore, IL	Graduated
Addie Deal	7	Guard	6'0"	Freshman	Irvine, CA	Transferred to Wisconsin
Kennise Johnson	13	Guard	5'4"	Junior	Joliet, IL	Transferred to Delaware
Emely Rodriguez	21	Guard-Forward	6'0"	Sophomore	La Romana, Dominican Republic	Suspended from the team due to violation of team rules; transferred to Syracuse
Jada Gyamfi	23	Forward	6'1"	Senior	Johnston, IA	Graduated
Callie Levin	32	Guard	5'9"	Sophomore	Solon, IA	Transferred to Northern Iowa
Hannah Stuelke	45	F	6'2"	Senior	Cedar Rapids, IA	Graduated
Teagan Mallegni	55	G	6'1"	Sophomore	McFarland, WI	Transferred to Wisconsin

=== Incoming transfers ===
Iowa incoming transfers
Name	Num	Pos.	Height	Year	Hometown	Previous School
Jocelyn Faison	1	Guard	6'1"	Sophomore	Atlanta, GA	Georgia
Dani Carnegie	3	Guard	5'9"	Junior	Mount Vernon, NY	Georgia
Amari Whiting	15	Guard	5'10"	Junior	Boise, ID	Oklahoma State
Bria Medina	50	Guard	5'6"	Senior	Tucson, AZ	Knox (NJCAA)

=== Recruiting class ===
College recruiting
Name	Hometown	School	Height	Weight	Commit date
McKenna Woliczko; W	San Bruno, CA	Archbishop Mitty High School	6 ft 2 in (1.88 m)	N/A	
McKenna Woliczko; W	Recruit ratings: Rivals: 247Sports: ESPN: (97)				
Overall recruit ranking: ESPN: 16
Note: In many cases, Scout, Rivals, 247Sports, On3, and ESPN may conflict in their listings of height and weight.; In these cases, the average was taken. ESPN grades are on a 100-point scale.; Sources: "2026 Player Commits". ESPN. Archived from the original on July 16, 2026.

== Roster ==
2026–27 Iowa Hawkeyes women's basketball team
Players
Coaches

Pos.	#	Name	Height	Year	Previous school	Hometown
G	0	Jocelyn Faison	6 ft 1 in (1.85 m)	So	Langston Hughes High School; Georgia	Atlanta, GA
G	1	Taylor Stremlow	5 ft 10 in (1.78 m)	Jr	Verona Area High School	Verona, WI
G	3	Dani Carnegie	5 ft 9 in (1.75 m)	Jr	Grayson High School; Georgia	Mount Vernon, NY
C	5	Ava Heiden	6 ft 4 in (1.93 m)	Jr	Sherwood High School	Sherwood, OR
F	7	Ella Strömdahl	6 ft 0 in (1.83 m)	Fr	RIG Lulea Swedish Academy	Uppsala, Sweden
G	8	Journey Houston	6 ft 0 in (1.83 m)	So	North High School	Davenport, IA
G	11	Chazadi Wright	5 ft 4 in (1.63 m)	Jr	Wesleyan School; Georgia Tech	Atlanta, GA
C	12	Layla Hays	6 ft 5 in (1.96 m)	So	Wasilla High School	Wasilla, AK
G	15	Amari Whiting	5 ft 10 in (1.78 m)	Sr	Burley High School; Oklahoma State	Boise, ID
F	20	McKenna Woliczko	6 ft 2 in (1.88 m)	Fr	Archbishop Mitty High School	San Bruno, CA
G	50	Bria Medina	5 ft 6 in (1.68 m)	Sr	Salpointe Catholic High School; Knox College	Tucson, AZ

Head coach

- Jan Jensen (Drake)

Assistant coach(es)

- Abby Stamp (Iowa)
- Randi Henderson (Iowa)
- LaSondra Barrett (LSU)
- Jasmyn Walker (Western Michigan)

Legend

- (C) Team captain
- (S) Suspended
- (I) Ineligible
- (W) Walk-on
- Injured
- Current redshirt

Roster

== Schedule and results ==
Date time, TV	Rank^{#}	Opponent^{#}	Result	Record	High points	High rebounds	High assists	Site (attendance) city, state
Exhibition
October 28, 2026*; 7:00 p.m., B1G+	No. 10	Maryville (MO)	W 124–67	–	30 – Carnegie	10 – Tied	7 – Wright	Carver–Hawkeye Arena (4,503); Iowa City, IA
Regular season
November 2, 2026*; 7:00 p.m., B1G+	No. 10	Towson	W 73–45	1–0	21 – Carnegie	8 – Woliczko	5 – Carnegie	Carver–Hawkeye Arena (13,131); Iowa City, IA
November 5, 2026*; 7:00 p.m., B1G+	No. 10	Eastern Illinois	W 80–39	2–0	22 – Woliczko	8 – Heiden	7 – Whiting	Carver–Hawkeye Arena (13,314); Iowa City, IA
November 8, 2026*; 1:00 p.m., FS1	No. 10	at No. 2 UConn	L 79–91	2–1	23 – Wright	7 – Whitling	5 – Wright	Harry A. Gampel Pavilion (10,244); Storrs, CT
November 12, 2026*; 7:30 p.m., BTN	No. 10т	Northern Iowa	W 78–40	3–1	22 – Carnegie	9 – Woliczko	6 – Carnegie	Carver–Hawkeye Arena (13,609); Iowa City, IA
November 15, 2026*; 12:00 p.m., FS1	No. 10т	vs. No. 8 Vanderbilt; Bad Boy Mower Series – Sioux City	W 75–65	4–1	16 – Wright	13 – Heiden	6 – Stremlow	Tyson Events Center (6,413); Sioux City, IA
November 19, 2026*; 7:00 p.m., B1G+	No. 8	Montana State	W 76–60	5–1	15 – Whiting	15 – Heiden	8 – Stremlow	Carver–Hawkeye Arena (12,793); Iowa City, IA
November 23, 2026*; 12:30 p.m., BDG Live		vs. Utah; Baha Mar Pink Flamingo Championship						Baha Mar Convention Center; Nassau, Bahamas
November 25, 2026*; 10:30 a.m., BDG Live		vs. Navy; Baha Mar Pink Flamingo Championship						Baha Mar Convention Center; Nassau, Bahamas
December 1, 2026*; 6:00 p.m., ESPN+		at Drake						Knapp Center; Des Moines, IA
December 5, 2026; 5:00 p.m., BTN		Nebraska						Carver–Hawkeye Arena; Iowa City, IA
December 9, 2026*; 7:00 p.m., FS1		Iowa State; Rivalry						Carver–Hawkeye Arena; Iowa City, IA
December 13, 2026*; 12:00 p.m., B1G+		Southern						Carver–Hawkeye Arena; Iowa City, IA
December 20, 2026*; 7:30 p.m., B1G+		Northern Illinois						Carver–Hawkeye Arena; Iowa City, IA
December 29, 2026; 12:00 p.m., Peacock/NBCSN		at Illinois						State Farm Center; Champaign, IL
January 1, 2027; 1:00 p.m., BTN		at Michigan State						Breslin Center; East Lansing, MI
January 5, 2027; 7:00 p.m., B1G+		Rutgers						Carver–Hawkeye Arena; Iowa City, IA
January 9, 2027; 11:00 a.m., FOX		at Minnesota						The Barn; Minneapolis, MN
January 14, 2027; 7:00 p.m., B1G+		Northwestern						Carver–Hawkeye Arena; Iowa City, IA
January 17, 2027; 5:00 p.m., BTN		Indiana						Carver–Hawkeye Arena; Iowa City, IA
January 24, 2027; 5:00 p.m., BTN		at Oregon						Matthew Knight Arena; Eugene, OR
January 27, 2027; 8:00 p.m., Peacock/NBCSN		at Washington						Alaska Airlines Arena; Seattle, WA
January 31, 2027; 2:00 p.m., B1G+		Wisconsin						Carver–Hawkeye Arena; Iowa City, IA
February 4, 2027; 7:30 p.m., Peacock/NBCSN		at Nebraska						Pinnacle Bank Arena; Lincoln, NE
February 7, 2027; 11:00 a.m., FOX		at Michigan						Crisler Center; Ann Arbor, MI
February 11, 2027; 6:00 p.m., FS1		USC						Carver–Hawkeye Arena; Iowa City, IA
February 14, 2027; 1:00 p.m., FOX		UCLA						Carver–Hawkeye Arena; Iowa City, IA
February 18, 2027; 5:00 p.m., BTN		at Penn State						Bryce Jordan Center; State College, PA
February 21, 2027; 1:00 p.m., B1G+		Purdue						Carver–Hawkeye Arena; Iowa City, IA
February 25, 2027; 6:30 p.m., Peacock/NBCSN		Maryland						Carver–Hawkeye Arena; Iowa City, IA
February 28, 2027; 11:00 a.m., FOX		at Ohio State						Value City Arena; Columbus, OH
*Non-conference game. ^{#}Rankings from AP Poll. (#) Tournament seedings in parentheses. All times are in Central.

== Rankings ==
Ranking movements Legend: ██ Increase in ranking ██ Decrease in ranking т = Tied with team above or below
	Week																				
Poll	Pre	1	2	3	4	5	6	7	8	9	10	11	12	13	14	15	16	17	18	19	Final
AP	10	10т	8																		
Coaches	10	13	10																		
