= 2026–27 Maryland Terrapins women's basketball team =

Intercollegiate basketball season

2026–27 Maryland Terrapins women's basketball
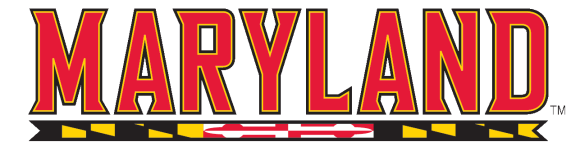
- Conference: Big Ten Conference

Ranking
- Coaches: No. 18
- AP: No. 18
- Record: 4–1 (0–0 Big Ten)
- Head coach: Brenda Frese (25th season)
- Assistant coaches: Carley Kuhns; Kaitlynn Fratz; Lindsey Spann; Jessica Imhof; Noelle Cobb
- Home arena: Xfinity Center

2026–27 Big Ten women's basketball standings
| | Conf. | | | | Overall |
| Team | W | | L | PCT | W | | L | PCT |
|---|---|---|---|---|---|---|---|---|
| Rutgers | 0 | – | 0 | – | 7 | – | 0 | 1.000 |
| Indiana | 0 | – | 0 | – | 6 | – | 0 | 1.000 |
| No. 2 Michigan | 0 | – | 0 | – | 5 | – | 0 | 1.000 |
| Michigan State | 0 | – | 0 | – | 5 | – | 0 | 1.000 |
| No. 17 Minnesota | 0 | – | 0 | – | 5 | – | 0 | 1.000 |
| No. 23 Nebraska | 0 | – | 0 | – | 5 | – | 0 | 1.000 |
| No. 10 UCLA | 0 | – | 0 | – | 5 | – | 0 | 1.000 |
| No. 16 Washington | 0 | – | 0 | – | 5 | – | 0 | 1.000 |
| No. 21 Illinois | 0 | – | 0 | – | 4 | – | 0 | 1.000 |
| Oregon | 0 | – | 0 | – | 6 | – | 1 | .857 |
| No. 8 Iowa | 0 | – | 0 | – | 5 | – | 1 | .833 |
| No. 19т Ohio State | 0 | – | 0 | – | 5 | – | 1 | .833 |
| Wisconsin | 0 | – | 0 | – | 5 | – | 1 | .833 |
| No. 18 Maryland | 0 | – | 0 | – | 4 | – | 1 | .800 |
| No. 4 USC | 0 | – | 0 | – | 4 | – | 1 | .800 |
| Purdue | 0 | – | 0 | – | 4 | – | 2 | .667 |
| Northwestern | 0 | – | 0 | – | 3 | – | 4 | .429 |
| Penn State | 0 | – | 0 | – | 1 | – | 4 | .200 |
† 2027 Big Ten tournament winner As of November 22, 2026; Rankings from AP poll

The 2026–27 Maryland Terrapins women's basketball team currently represents the University of Maryland, College Park during the 2026–27 NCAA Division I women's basketball season. The Terrapins, led by head coach Brenda Frese in her 25th season, play their home games at the Xfinity Center in College Park, Maryland, and compete as a member of the Big Ten Conference.

== Previous season ==
The Terrapins finished the 2025–26 season 24–9 overall and 11–7 in Big Ten play, to finish sixth in the conference. As the No. 6 seed in the Big Ten tournament, they were upset 68–73 in the second round to No. 11 Oregon.

Following the loss, the Terrapins earned an at-large bid to the NCAA tournament, being seeded No. 5 in the Fort Worth #1 Regional. They defeated No. 12 Murray State in the first round, but lost in the second round to No. 4 North Carolina 66–74 to end their season.

== Offseason ==
=== Departures ===
Maryland departures
| Name | Num | Pos. | Height | Year | Hometown | Reason for departure |
|---|---|---|---|---|---|---|
| Kaylene Smikle | 2 | Guard | 6'0" | Senior | Bay Shore, NY | Transferred to Tennessee |
| Saylor Poffenbarger | 6 | Guard | 6'2" | (redshirt) Senior | Middletown, MD | Graduated; went undrafted in the 2026 WNBA draft, signed training camp contract with the Minnesota Lynx |
| Kyndal Walker | 8 | Guard | 5'9" | (redshirt) Freshman | Beltsville, MD | Transferred to Georgia Tech |
| Isimenme Ozzy-Momodu | 9 | Forward | 6'3" | (redshirt) Junior | London, England | Transferred to Oklahoma |
| Mir McLean | 10 | Guard-Forward | 5'11" | Graduate Student | Baltimore, MD | Graduated |
| Yarden Garzon | 12 | Guard | 6'3" | Senior | Ra'anana, Israel | Graduated; went undrafted in the 2026 WNBA draft, signed training camp contract with the Phoenix Mercury |
| Nicole Fritea | 21 | Forward | 6'2" | Freshman | Arad, Romania | Transferred to Eastern Kentucky |
| Breanna Williams | 40 | Forward | 6'2" | (redshirt) Freshman | Billings, MT | Transferred to Arizona |

=== Incoming transfers ===
Maryland incoming transfers
| Name | Num | Pos. | Height | Year | Hometown | Previous school |
|---|---|---|---|---|---|---|
| Sunaja 'Nunu' Agara | 9 | Forward | 6'2" | Senior | Minneapolis, MN | Stanford |
| Chloe Sotell | 22 | Guard | 6'0" | Junior | Stamford, CT | Missouri |

=== Recruiting class ===
College recruiting
| Name | Hometown | School | Height | Weight | Commit date |
|---|---|---|---|---|---|
| Jordyn Jackson; G | Old Bridge, NJ | St. James Performance Academy | 6 ft 1 in (1.85 m) | N/A | |
| Jordyn Jackson; G | Recruit ratings: Rivals: 247Sports: ESPN: (97) | | | | |
| Trinity Jones; G | Naperville, IL | Naperville Central High School | 6 ft 1 in (1.85 m) | N/A | |
| Trinity Jones; G | Recruit ratings: Rivals: 247Sports: ESPN: (97) | | | | |
| Mimi Thiero; F | Sewickley, PA | Quaker Valley High School | 6 ft 5 in (1.96 m) | N/A | |
| Mimi Thiero; F | Recruit ratings: Rivals: 247Sports: ESPN: (94) | | | | |
Overall recruit ranking: ESPN: 7
Note: In many cases, Scout, Rivals, 247Sports, On3, and ESPN may conflict in their listings of height and weight.; In these cases, the average was taken. ESPN grades are on a 100-point scale.; Sources: "2026 Player Commits". ESPN. Archived from the original on July 26, 2026.

== Roster ==
2026–27 Maryland Terrapins women's basketball team
Players
Coaches

| Pos. | # | Name | Height | Year | Previous school | Hometown |
|---|---|---|---|---|---|---|
| G | 0 | Rainey Welson | 5 ft 10 in (1.78 m) | So | Hortonville High School | Greenville, WI |
| G | 1 | Lea Bartelme | 5 ft 8 in (1.73 m) | RS Fr | ŽKK Celje | Kisovec, Slovenia |
| F | 2 | Mimi Thiero | 6 ft 5 in (1.96 m) | Fr | Quaker Valley High School | Sewickley, PA |
| G | 3 | Addi Mack | 5 ft 9 in (1.75 m) | So | Minnehaha Academy | Minneapolis, MN |
| G/F | 5 | Ava McKennie | 6 ft 2 in (1.88 m) | Jr | McDonogh School | McSherrystown, PA |
| F | 6 | Marya Boiko | 6 ft 4 in (1.93 m) | So | MBA Moscow | Minsk, Belarus |
| G | 7 | Oluchi Okananwa | 5 ft 10 in (1.78 m) | Sr | Worcester Academy; Duke | Boston, MA |
| G | 8 | Jordyn Jackson | 6 ft 1 in (1.85 m) | Fr | St. James Performance Academy | Old Bridge, NJ |
| F | 9 | Nunu Agara | 6 ft 2 in (1.88 m) | Sr | Hopkins High School; Stanford | Minneapolis, MN |
| G | 10 | Trinity Jones | 6 ft 1 in (1.85 m) | Fr | Naperville Central High School | Naperville, IL |
| C | 14 | Eva-Grace Yebila | 6 ft 4 in (1.93 m) | Fr | City of London Academy, Southwark | London, England |
| G | 22 | Chloe Sotell | 6 ft 0 in (1.83 m) | Jr | Montverde Academy; Missouri | Stamford, CT |
| G | 24 | Bri McDaniel | 5 ft 10 in (1.78 m) | GS | Kenwood Academy | Chicago, IL |

Head coach

- Brenda Frese (Arizona)

Assistant coach(es)

- Carley Kuhns (Valdosta State)
- Kaitlynn Fratz (California (PA))
- Lindsey Spann (Penn State)
- Jessica Imhof (TCNJ)
- Noelle Cobb (La Verne)

Legend

- (C) Team captain
- (S) Suspended
- (I) Ineligible
- (W) Walk-on
- Injured
- Current redshirt

Roster
Last update: July 26, 2026

== Schedule and results ==
| Date time, TV | Rank^{#} | Opponent^{#} | Result | Record | High points | High rebounds | High assists | Site (attendance) city, state |
Exhibition
| October 19, 2026*; 6:00 p.m., B1G+ | | Virginia Tech | W 93–82 | | 23 – Okananwa | 8 – Jones | 3 – Bartelme | Xfinity Center (1,551); College Park, MD |
| October 24, 2026*; 1:00 p.m., B1G+ | No. 20 | No. 12 North Carolina | W 72–68 | | 22 – Agara | 11 – Agara | 4 – Mack | Xfinity Center (5,007); College Park, MD |
Regular season
| November 2, 2026; 12:00 p.m., ESPN | No. 20 | vs. No. 1 South Carolina; Oui-Play | L 93–101 | 0–1 | 35 – Mack | 9 – Okananwa | 6 – Tied | Adidas Arena (5,000); Paris, France |
| November 8, 2026*; 1:00 p.m., B1G+ | No. 20 | George Mason | W 81–62 | 1–1 | 24 – Okananwa | 7 – Bartleme | 5 – Mack | Xfinity Center (6,065); College Park, MD |
| November 15, 2026*; 1:00 p.m., B1G+ | No. 19т | Columbia | W 85–58 | 2–1 | 17 – Welson | 6 – Tied | 5 – McDaniel | Xfinity Center (4,519); College Park, MD |
| November 18, 2026*; 6:00 p.m., B1G+ | No. 18 | Coppin State | W 84–31 | 3–1 | 12 – Mack | 10 – Thiero | 3 – Tied | Xfinity Center (4,337); College Park, MD |
| November 21, 2026*; 12:00 p.m., B1G+ | No. 18 | Morgan State | W 109–39 | 4–1 | 20 – Okananwa | 12 – Thiero | 6 – Mack | Xfinity Center (5,093); College Park, MD |
| November 24, 2026*; 7:00 p.m., B1G+ | | Monmouth | | | | | | Xfinity Center; College Park, MD |
| November 28, 2026*; 4:00 p.m., FloCollege | | at Towson | | | | | | SECU Arena; Towson, MD |
| December 1, 2026*; 6:30 p.m., B1G+ | | Ball State | | | | | | Xfinity Center; College Park, MD |
| December 5, 2026*; 4:30 p.m., FOX | | vs. UConn; Women's Champion Classic | | | | | | Barclays Center; Brooklyn, NY |
| December 7, 2026*; 7:00 p.m., B1G+ | | Lehigh | | | | | | Xfinity Center; College Park, MD |
| December 11, 2026; 7:00 p.m., NBCSN/Peacock | | Michigan | | | | | | Xfinity Center; College Park, MD |
| December 13, 2026*; 12:00 p.m., B1G+ | | Mount St. Mary's | | | | | | Xfinity Center; College Park, MD |
| December 18, 2026*; 11:00 a.m., B1G+ | | UMBC | | | | | | Xfinity Center; College Park, MD |
| December 30, 2026; 4:00 p.m., B1G+ | | Minnesota | | | | | | Xfinity Center; College Park, MD |
| January 2, 2027; 4:00 p.m., BTN | | at Ohio State | | | | | | Value City Arena; Columbus, OH |
| January 5, 2027; 7:00 p.m., B1G+ | | at Indiana | | | | | | Simon Skjodt Assembly Hall; Bloomington, IN |
| January 8, 2027; 8:00 p.m., NBCSN/Peacock | | USC | | | | | | Xfinity Center; College Park, MD |
| January 14, 2027; 9:00 p.m., BTN | | at Washington | | | | | | Alaska Airlines Arena; Seattle, WA |
| January 17, 2027; 5:00 p.m., B1G+ | | at Oregon | | | | | | Matthew Knight Arena; Eugene, OR |
| January 21, 2027; 7:00 p.m., FS1 | | Ohio State | | | | | | Xfinity Center; College Park, MD |
| January 24, 2027; 12:00 p.m., BTN | | UCLA | | | | | | Xfinity Center; College Park, MD |
| January 28, 2027; 7:00 p.m., BTN | | at Wisconsin | | | | | | Kohl Center; Madison, WI |
| February 1, 2027; 7:00 p.m., BTN | | Michigan State | | | | | | Xfinity Center; College Park, MD |
| February 4, 2027; 6:00 p.m., BTN | | at Purdue | | | | | | Mackey Arena; West Lafayette, IN |
| February 7, 2027; 1:00 p.m., B1G+ | | at Penn State | | | | | | Bryce Jordan Center; State College, PA |
| February 14, 2027; 12:00 p.m., BTN | | Nebraska | | | | | | Xfinity Center; College Park, MD |
| February 17, 2027; 7:00 p.m., B1G+ | | Illinois | | | | | | Xfinity Center; College Park, MD |
| February 21, 2027; 1:00 p.m., BTN | | at Northwestern | | | | | | Welsh–Ryan Arena; Evanston, IL |
| February 25, 2027; 7:30 p.m., NBCSN/Peacock | | at Iowa | | | | | | Carver–Hawkeye Arena; Iowa City, IA |
| February 28, 2027; 12:00 p.m., BTN | | Rutgers | | | | | | Xfinity Center; College Park, MD |
*Non-conference game. ^{#}Rankings from AP Poll. (#) Tournament seedings in parentheses. All times are in Eastern.

== Rankings ==
Ranking movements Legend: ██ Increase in ranking ██ Decrease in ranking т = Tied with team above or below
| | Week | | | | | | | | | | | | | | | | | | | | |
| Poll | Pre | 1 | 2 | 3 | 4 | 5 | 6 | 7 | 8 | 9 | 10 | 11 | 12 | 13 | 14 | 15 | 16 | 17 | 18 | 19 | Final |
|---|---|---|---|---|---|---|---|---|---|---|---|---|---|---|---|---|---|---|---|---|---|
| AP | 20 | 19т | 18 | | | | | | | | | | | | | | | | | | |
| Coaches | 17 | 18 | 18 | | | | | | | | | | | | | | | | | | |
