= 2026–27 UCLA Bruins women's basketball team =

American college basketball season

2026–27 UCLA Bruins women's basketball
- Conference: Big Ten Conference

Ranking
- Coaches: No. 11
- AP: No. 10
- Record: 5–0 (0–0 Big Ten)
- Head coach: Cori Close (16th season)
- Associate head coach: Tony Newnan; Shannon LeBeauf
- Assistant coaches: Soh Matsuura; James Clark; Noelle Quinn
- Home arena: Pauley Pavilion

2026–27 Big Ten women's basketball standings
	Conf.				Overall
Team	W		L	PCT	W		L	PCT
Indiana	0	–	0	–	6	–	0	1.000
Rutgers	0	–	0	–	6	–	0	1.000
No. 2 Michigan	0	–	0	–	5	–	0	1.000
Michigan State	0	–	0	–	5	–	0	1.000
No. 17 Minnesota	0	–	0	–	5	–	0	1.000
No. 23 Nebraska	0	–	0	–	5	–	0	1.000
No. 10 UCLA	0	–	0	–	5	–	0	1.000
No. 16 Washington	0	–	0	–	5	–	0	1.000
No. 21 Illinois	0	–	0	–	4	–	0	1.000
Oregon	0	–	0	–	6	–	1	.857
No. 8 Iowa	0	–	0	–	5	–	1	.833
No. 19т Ohio State	0	–	0	–	5	–	1	.833
Wisconsin	0	–	0	–	5	–	1	.833
Purdue	0	–	0	–	4	–	1	.800
No. 4 USC	0	–	0	–	4	–	1	.800
No. 18 Maryland	0	–	0	–	3	–	1	.750
Northwestern	0	–	0	–	2	–	4	.333
Penn State	0	–	0	–	1	–	4	.200
† 2027 Big Ten tournament winner As of November 21, 2026; Rankings from AP poll

The 2026–27 UCLA Bruins women's basketball team currently represents the University of California, Los Angeles during the 2026–27 NCAA Division I women's basketball season. The Bruins, led by sixteenth-year head coach Cori Close, play their home games at Pauley Pavilion in Los Angeles, California and compete as a member of the Big Ten Conference.

== Previous season ==
The Bruins finished the 2025–26 season 37–1 overall and undefeated in Big Ten play, to finish first in the conference and capture their first outright regular season title since joining the Big Ten. In the Big Ten tournament as the top seed, they earned a double-bye to the quarterfinals, routing No. 8 Washington before defeating No. 5 Ohio State in the semifinals. UCLA then went on to win the Big Ten title and earn the conference's automatic bid to the NCAA tournament after defeating No. 2 Iowa 96–45, setting a new Big Ten record for largest margin of victory (51 points) in the championship game.

In the NCAA tournament, UCLA was seeded No. 1 in the Sacramento #2 Regional, as well as second overall in the field of 68. In the first and second rounds, they easily defeated No. 16 California Baptist and No. 8 Oklahoma State. They then advanced to the Sweet Sixteen, where they took down No. 4 Minnesota, moving on to defeat No. 3 Duke to win the regional title.

The Bruins went back to the Final Four, where they got their redemption and defeated Fort Worth #3 top seed Texas, in a rematch of their November game where the Longhorns won 76–65 to hand UCLA their only loss of the season. Finally, UCLA were able to capture their first ever NCAA title, as well as the first since their 1978 AIAW title, by defeating South Carolina 79–51 in the 2026 NCAA Division I women's basketball championship game. All of the Bruins' points in the Final Four and the national championship were scored by the team's six seniors.

The following month, UCLA would make history in the 2026 WNBA draft with five players being selected in the first round, the most since UConn achieved the feat in 2016.

== Offseason ==
The previous season's roster was the most veteran-dependent in either men's or women's college basketball. The record WNBA draft left the Bruins with creating a whole new starting lineup. Coach Cori Close reported she expected to add five transfers. The rest of the 2025-26 squad returned for the season, with none entering the transfer portal. Timea Gardiner, now a graduate student following her injury and redshirt season, also returned to the lineup.

Elina Aarnisalo, one of the highly ranked 2024–25 freshman recruiting class, had transferred to North Carolina before the 2025-26 season.. She returned for a new role with the team with all the previous starters graduated. Bonnie Deas from Arkansas and Donovyn Hunter from TCU were the next two transfers from the portal. Addy Brown from Iowa State and KK Bransford from Notre Dame were the final two transfers to join the Bruins by the end of April.

Shannon LeBeauf returned to the Bruins as an assistant coach after a year as part of the coaching staff of the 2025–26 Rutgers Scarlet Knights women's basketball team. Noelle Quinn joined the coaching staff in August 2026. Assistant coach Tasha Brown departed to join the staff of the Washington Huskies. Michaela Onyenwere departed to the Washington Mystics, where she joined as a teammate to the recently drafted Lauren Betts and Angela Dugalić. On July 23, 2026, the Bruins played an exhibition game against the Canadian National team, losing 55-69. On October 4, 2026, UCLA announced that sophomore Lena Bilić had torn her anterior cruciate ligament (ACL) and would not participate in the 2026-27 campaign.

=== Departures ===
UCLA departures
Name	Num	Pos.	Height	Year	Hometown	Reason for departure
Kiki Rice	1	Guard	5'11'	Senior	Bethesda, MD	Graduated, selected 6th overall by the Toronto Tempo in the 2026 WNBA draft
Charlisse Leger-Walker	5	Guard	5'10"	Graduate Student	Waikato, New Zealand	Graduated, selected 18th overall by the Connecticut Sun in the 2026 WNBA draft
Gianna Kneepkens	8	Guard	5'10"	Senior	Duluth, MN	Graduated, selected 15th overall by the Connecticut Sun in the 2026 WNBA draft
Gabriela Jaquez	11	Forward	6'0"	Senior	Camarillo, CA	Graduated, selected 5th overall by the Chicago Sky in the 2026 WNBA draft
Angela Dugalić	32	Forward	6'4"	Graduate Student	Des Plaines, IL	Graduated, selected 9th overall by the Washington Mystics in the 2026 WNBA draft
Megan Grant	43	Guard/Forward	5'10"	Senior	San Mateo, CA	UCLA softball walk-on; graduated, selected 4th overall by the Portland Cascade in the 2026 AUSL draft
Lauren Betts	51	Center	6'7"	Senior	Centennial, CO	Graduated, selected 4th overall by the Washington Mystics in the 2026 WNBA draft

=== Additions ===
UCLA incoming transfers
Name	Num	Pos.	Height	Year	Hometown	Previous school
Donovyn Hunter	4	Guard	6'0"	Senior	Medford, OR	TCU
Elina Aarnisalo	7	Guard	5'10"	Junior	Helsinki, Finland	North Carolina
KK Bransford	14	Guard	5'11"	Graduate Student	Cincinnati, OH	Notre Dame
Bonnie Deas	22	Guard	5'9"	Sophomore	Frankston, Australia	Arkansas
Addy Brown	24	Forward	6'2"	Senior	Derby, KS	Iowa State

=== Recruiting class ===
There was no 2026 recruiting class.

==== 2027 recruiting class ====
College recruiting (2027)
Name	Hometown	School	Height	Weight	Commit date
Ginny Dumont; G	Charlotte, NC	DME Academy	5 ft 11 in (1.80 m)	N/A	
Ginny Dumont; G	Recruit ratings: 247Sports: ESPN: (91)				
Overall recruit ranking:
Note: In many cases, Scout, Rivals, 247Sports, On3, and ESPN may conflict in their listings of height and weight.; In these cases, the average was taken. ESPN grades are on a 100-point scale.; Sources: "2027 Player Commits". ESPN. Archived from the original on August 12, 2025.

== Roster ==
Years are listed according to the new NCAA age-based eligibility model.

2026–27 UCLA Bruins women's basketball team
Players
Coaches

Pos.	#	Name	Height	Year	Previous school	Hometown
G	3	Christina Karamouzi	6 ft 0 in (1.83 m)	So		Luleå, Sweden
G	4	Donovyn Hunter	6 ft 0 in (1.83 m)	Sr	South Medford High School; TCU	Medford, OR
G	7	Elina Aarnisalo	5 ft 10 in (1.78 m)	Jr	Mäkelänrinne; North Carolina	Helsinki, Finland
G	8	Lina Jerković	6 ft 0 in (1.83 m)	Fr		Rogaška Slatina, Slovenia
G/F	9	Lena Bilić (injured)	6 ft 3 in (1.91 m)	So	XVI Gimnazija	Zagreb, Croatia
G	11	Somto Okafor	5 ft 9 in (1.75 m)	Fr		Barcelona, Spain
G	14	KK Bransford (5th)	5 ft 11 in (1.8 m)	Sr	Mount Notre Dame High School; Notre Dame	Cincinnati, OH
F	16	Sienna Betts	6 ft 4 in (1.93 m)	So	Grandview High School	Centennial, CO
G	22	Bonnie Deas	5 ft 9 in (1.75 m)	So	Centre of Excellence; Arkansas	Frankston, Australia
F	24	Addy Brown	6 ft 2 in (1.88 m)	Sr	Derby High School; Iowa State	Derby, KS
F	30	Timea Gardiner (5th)	6 ft 3 in (1.91 m)	Sr	Fremont; Oregon State	Ogden, UT
F	33	Amanda Muse	6 ft 4 in (1.93 m)	Sr	Heritage High School	Brentwood, CA

Head coach

- Cori Close (UC Santa Barbara)

Assistant coach(es)

- Tony Newnan (UC Santa Barbara)
- Shannon Perry-LeBeauf (Iowa)
- Soh Matsuura (UCLA)
- James Clark (La Salle)
- Noelle Quinn (UCLA)

Legend

- (C) Team captain
- (S) Suspended
- (I) Ineligible
- (W) Walk-on
- (5th) Fifth-year senior
- Injured
- Current redshirt

Roster
Last update: August 12, 2026

== Schedule and results ==
Date time, TV	Rank^{#}	Opponent^{#}	Result	Record	High points	High rebounds	High assists	Site (attendance) city, state
Exhibition
October 14, 2026*; 6:00 p.m.		at California; Jason Kidd Tip-Off	W 87–53		20 – Aarnisalo	12 – Betts	7 – Aarnisalo	Haas Pavilion (3,434); Berkeley, CA
October 25, 2026*; 11:00 a.m.	No. 11	vs. No. 6 Texas; Nyle Maxwell's Lonestar Showcase	L 64–81		13 – Aarnisalo	8 – Aarnisalo	3 – Aarnisalo	H-E-B Center; Cedar Park, TX
Regular season
November 2, 2026*; 11:30 a.m., B1G+	No. 11	Lehigh	W 73–53	1–0	15 – Betts	7 – Betts	4 – Tied	Pauley Pavilion (4,697); Los Angeles, CA
November 5, 2026*; 7:00 p.m., B1G+	No. 11	UC Irvine	W 78–42	2–0	17 – Betts	8 – Brown	5 – Tied	Pauley Pavilion (2,548); Los Angeles, CA
November 12, 2026*; 7:30 p.m., BTN	No. 10т	Arizona	W 76–44	3–0	18 – Brown	10 – Betts	4 – Tied	Pauley Pavilion (2,578); Los Angeles, CA
November 15, 2026*; 3:00 p.m., BTN	No. 10т	Princeton	W 55–34	4–0	14 – Bransford	8 – Hunter	4 – Hunter	Pauley Pavilion (8,909); Los Angeles, CA
November 19, 2026*; 7:00 p.m., B1G+	No. 10	Cal Poly	W 96–34	5–0	29 – Gardiner	8 – Betts	9 – Betts	Pauley Pavilion (2,490); Los Angeles, CA
November 22, 2026*; 2:30 p.m., ESPN	No. 10	at Tennessee						Thompson–Boling Arena; Knoxville, TN
November 24, 2026*; 2:00 p.m., Peacock/NBCSN		vs. St. John's; Basketball Hall of Fame Women's Showcase						Mohegan Sun Arena; Uncasville, CT
November 29, 2026*; 2:00 p.m., B1G+		Penn						Pauley Pavilion; Los Angeles, CA
December 6, 2026; 3:00 p.m., BTN		at Oregon						Matthew Knight Arena; Eugene, OR
December 11, 2026*; 7:00 p.m., B1G+		Cal State Bakersfield						Pauley Pavilion; Los Angeles, CA
December 16, 2026*; 4:00 p.m., ION		vs. Duke; Scripps Sports Women's Basketball Showcase						Mortgage Matchup Center; Phoenix, AZ
December 19, 2026*; 5:30 p.m., ESPN		vs. South Carolina; Players Era Women's Festival						Michelob Ultra Arena; Paradise, NV
December 20, 2026*; 2:00 p.m., ESPN		vs. Texas; Players Era Women's Festival						Michelob Ultra Arena; Paradise, NV
December 30, 2026; 6:00 p.m., B1G+		Northwestern						Pauley Pavilion; Los Angeles, CA
January 2, 2027; 5:00 p.m., BTN		Nebraska						Pauley Pavilion; Los Angeles, CA
January 5, 2027; 4:00 p.m., B1G+		at Purdue						Mackey Arena; West Lafayette, IN
January 8, 2027; 3:00 p.m., Peacock/NBCSN		at Indiana						Simon Skjodt Assembly Hall; Bloomington, IN
January 12, 2027; 7:30 p.m., BTN		Minnesota						Pauley Pavilion; Los Angeles, CA
January 15, 2027; 7:00 p.m., B1G+		Penn State						Pauley Pavilion; Los Angeles, CA
January 18, 2027*; 9:00 a.m., FOX		vs. Oklahoma; Coretta Scott King Classic						Prudential Center; Newark, NJ
January 21, 2027; 4:00 p.m., B1G+		at Rutgers						Jersey Mike's Arena; Piscataway, NJ
January 24, 2027; 9:00 a.m., BTN		at Maryland						Xfinity Center; College Park, MD
January 30, 2027; 12:00 p.m., Peacock/NBCSN		Illinois						Pauley Pavilion; Los Angeles, CA
February 2, 2027; 7:00 p.m., FS1		Michigan						Pauley Pavilion; Los Angeles, CA
February 7, 2027; 5:00 p.m., FOX		USC; Rivalry						Pauley Pavilion; Los Angeles, CA
February 11, 2027; 6:00 p.m., FS1		at Wisconsin						Kohl Center; Madison, WI
February 14, 2027; 11:00 a.m., FOX		at Iowa						Carver–Hawkeye Arena; Iowa City, IA
February 18, 2027; 7:30 p.m., BTN		Ohio State						Pauley Pavilion; Los Angeles, CA
February 21, 2027; 12:00 p.m., BTN		Michigan State						Pauley Pavilion; Los Angeles, CA
February 25, 2027; 6:30 p.m., Peacock/NBCSN		at USC; Rivalry						Galen Center; Los Angeles, CA
February 28, 2027; 11:00 a.m., BTN		at Washington						Alaska Airlines Arena; Seattle, WA
*Non-conference game. ^{#}Rankings from AP Poll. (#) Tournament seedings in parentheses. All times are in Pacific. Source:

== Rankings ==
Ranking movements Legend: ██ Increase in ranking ██ Decrease in ranking т = Tied with team above or below
	Week																				
Poll	Pre	1	2	3	4	5	6	7	8	9	10	11	12	13	14	15	16	17	18	19	Final
AP	11	10т	10																		
Coaches	12	12	11																		
