= 2027 Big Ten women's basketball tournament =

- Classification: Division I
- Season: 2026–27
- Teams: 15
- Site: T-Mobile Arena; Paradise, Nevada
- Television: Peacock/NBCSN, BTN, CBS/Paramount+

2026–27 Big Ten women's basketball standings
	Conf.				Overall
Team	W		L	PCT	W		L	PCT
Rutgers	0	–	0	–	7	–	0	1.000
Indiana	0	–	0	–	6	–	0	1.000
No. 2 Michigan	0	–	0	–	5	–	0	1.000
Michigan State	0	–	0	–	5	–	0	1.000
No. 17 Minnesota	0	–	0	–	5	–	0	1.000
No. 23 Nebraska	0	–	0	–	5	–	0	1.000
No. 10 UCLA	0	–	0	–	5	–	0	1.000
No. 16 Washington	0	–	0	–	5	–	0	1.000
No. 21 Illinois	0	–	0	–	4	–	0	1.000
Oregon	0	–	0	–	6	–	1	.857
No. 8 Iowa	0	–	0	–	5	–	1	.833
No. 19т Ohio State	0	–	0	–	5	–	1	.833
Wisconsin	0	–	0	–	5	–	1	.833
No. 18 Maryland	0	–	0	–	4	–	1	.800
No. 4 USC	0	–	0	–	4	–	1	.800
Purdue	0	–	0	–	4	–	2	.667
Northwestern	0	–	0	–	3	–	4	.429
Penn State	0	–	0	–	1	–	4	.200
† 2027 Big Ten tournament winner As of November 22, 2026; Rankings from AP poll

The 2027 Big Ten women's basketball tournament (branded as the 2027 Allstate Big Ten Women's Basketball Tournament for sponsorship reasons) is an upcoming postseason women's basketball tournament for the Big Ten Conference of the 2026–27 NCAA Division I women's basketball season which took place from March 3–7, 2027. The tournament will be held at T-Mobile Arena in Paradise, Nevada.

== Seeds ==
The top 15 Big Ten schools participated in the tournament. Teams were seeded by conference record, with a tiebreaker system used to seed teams with identical conference records. The top nine teams received a first round bye and the top four teams received a double bye.

Seed	School	Conference	Tiebreaker
1			
2			
3			
4			
5			
6			
7			
8			
9			
10			
11			
12			
13			
14			
15			
DNQ			
DNQ			
DNQ			

== Schedule ==
Session	Game	Time*	Matchup^{#}	Score	Television	Attendance
First round – Wednesday, March 3
1	1	12:30 p.m.	No. 13 vs. No. 12		Peacock/NBCSN	
1	2	3:00 p.m.	No. 15 vs. No. 10		Peacock/NBCSN	
1	3	5:30 p.m.	No. 14 vs. No. 11		Peacock/NBCSN	
Second round – Thursday, March 4
2	4	11:00 a.m.	No. 9 vs. No. 8		BTN	
2	5	1:30 p.m.	Winner of game 1 vs. No. 5		BTN	
3	6	5:30 p.m.	Winner of game 2 vs. No. 7		BTN	
3	7	8:00 p.m.	Winner of game 3 vs. No. 6		BTN	
Quarterfinals – Friday, March 5
4	8	11:00 a.m.	Winner of game 4 vs. No. 1		BTN	
4	9	1:30 p.m.	Winner of game 5 vs. No. 4		BTN	
5	10	5:30 p.m.	Winner of game 6 vs. No. 2		BTN	
5	11	8:00 p.m.	Winner of game 7 vs. No. 3		BTN	
Semifinals – Saturday, March 6
6	12	12:00 p.m.	Winner of game 8 vs. Winner of game 9		BTN	
6	13	2:30 p.m.	Winner of game 10 vs. Winner of game 11		BTN	
Championship – Sunday, March 8
7	14	1:30 p.m.	Winner of game 12 vs. Winner of game 13		CBS	

*Game times in PST through the semifinals and PDT for the championship. #Rankings denote tournament seeding.

== Bracket ==
First round Wednesday, March 3 Peacock/NBCSN
12
13
10
15
11
14

Second round Thursday, March 4 BTN
8
9
5
7
6

Quarterfinals; Friday, March 5 BTN
1
4
2
3

Semifinals; Saturday, March 6 BTN

Championship; Sunday, March 7 CBS

* denotes overtime period

== Game summaries ==
=== First round ===
Peacock/NBCSN

March 3
12:30 p.m.

No. 13 vs. No. 12

T-Mobile Arena
Paradise, NV

Peacock/NBCSN

March 3
3:00 p.m.

No. 15 vs. No. 10

T-Mobile Arena
Paradise, NV

Peacock/NBCSN

March 3
5:30 p.m.

No. 14 vs. No. 11

T-Mobile Arena
Paradise, NV

=== Second round ===
BTN

March 4
11:00 a.m.

No. 9 vs. No. 8

T-Mobile Arena
Paradise, NV

BTN

March 4
1:30 p.m.

vs. No. 5

T-Mobile Arena
Paradise, NV

BTN

March 4
5:30 p.m.

vs. No. 7

T-Mobile Arena
Paradise, NV

BTN

March 5
8:00 p.m.

vs. No. 6

T-Mobile Arena
Paradise, NV

=== Quarterfinals ===
BTN

March 4
11:00 a.m.

vs. No. 1

T-Mobile Arena
Paradise, NV

BTN

March 4
1:30 p.m.

vs. No. 4

T-Mobile Arena
Paradise, NV

BTN

March 4
5:30 p.m.

vs. No. 2

T-Mobile Arena
Paradise, NV

BTN

March 5
8:00 p.m.

vs. No. 3

T-Mobile Arena
Paradise, NV

=== Semifinals ===
BTN

March 6
12:00 p.m.

T-Mobile Arena
Paradise, NV

BTN

March 7
2:30 p.m.

T-Mobile Arena
Paradise, NV

=== Championship ===
CBS

March 7
1:30 p.m.

T-Mobile Arena
Paradise, NV
