= 2026 Big Ten women's basketball tournament =

- Classification: Division I
- Season: 2025–26
- Teams: 15
- Site: Gainbridge Fieldhouse; Indianapolis, Indiana
- Champions: UCLA (2nd title)
- Winning coach: Cori Close (2nd title)
- MVP: Kiki Rice (UCLA)
- Attendance: 41,835
- Television: Peacock/NBCSN, BTN, CBS/Paramount+

2025–26 Big Ten women's basketball standings
	Conf.				Overall
Team	W		L	PCT	W		L	PCT
No. 1 UCLA †	18	–	0	1.000	37	–	1	.974
No. 7 Michigan	15	–	3	.833	28	–	7	.800
No. 16 Iowa	15	–	3	.833	27	–	7	.794
No. 17 Ohio State	13	–	5	.722	27	–	8	.771
No. 15 Minnesota	13	–	5	.722	24	–	9	.727
No. 20 Maryland	11	–	7	.611	24	–	9	.727
No. 22 Michigan State	11	–	7	.611	23	–	9	.719
No. 25 Washington	10	–	8	.556	22	–	11	.667
USC	9	–	9	.500	18	–	14	.563
Illinois	9	–	9	.500	22	–	12	.647
Oregon	8	–	10	.444	23	–	13	.639
Nebraska	7	–	11	.389	19	–	13	.594
Indiana	6	–	12	.333	18	–	14	.563
Purdue	5	–	13	.278	13	–	17	.433
Wisconsin	5	–	13	.278	16	–	18	.471
Penn State	4	–	14	.222	11	–	18	.379
Northwestern	2	–	16	.111	8	–	21	.276
Rutgers	1	–	17	.056	9	–	20	.310
† 2026 Big Ten tournament winner Rankings from AP poll

The 2026 Big Ten women's basketball tournament (branded as the 2026 Allstate Big Ten Women's Basketball Tournament for sponsorship reasons) was a postseason women's basketball tournament for the Big Ten Conference of the 2025–26 NCAA Division I women's basketball season which took place from March 4–8, 2026. The tournament was held at the Gainbridge Fieldhouse in Indianapolis, Indiana.

Following the completion of the 2025–26 Big Ten Conference women's basketball regular season, the bracket was announced on March 1, 2026. The top four seeds were UCLA, Iowa, Michigan, and Minnesota. Penn State, Northwestern, and Rutgers did not participate as the lowest three teams in the standings.

The UCLA Bruins were the tournament winner. As the tournament winner, the Bruins received the conference automatic bid to the 2026 NCAA Division I women's basketball tournament.

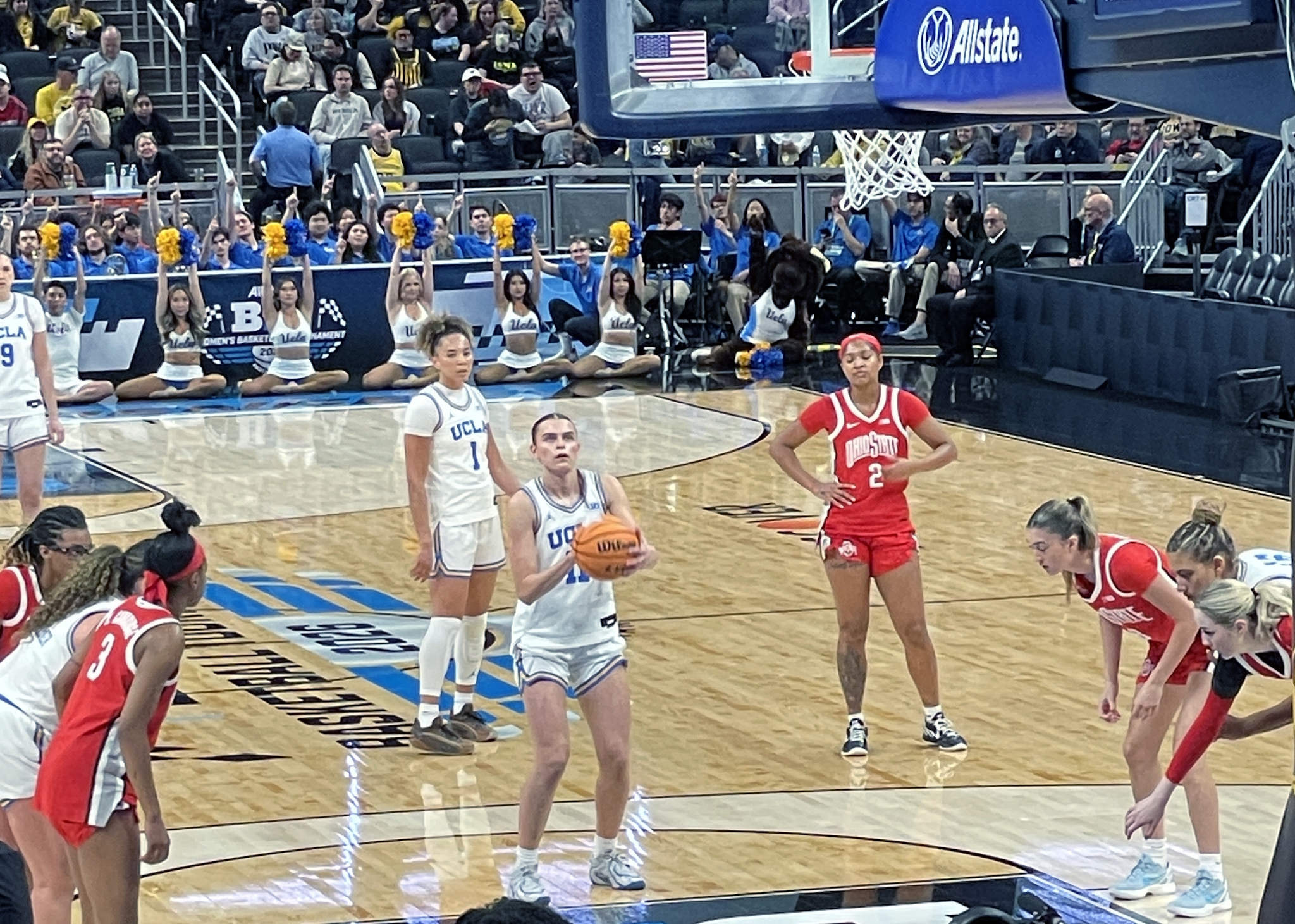
UCLA vs. Ohio State 2026 Big Ten Women's basketball Tournament semi-final

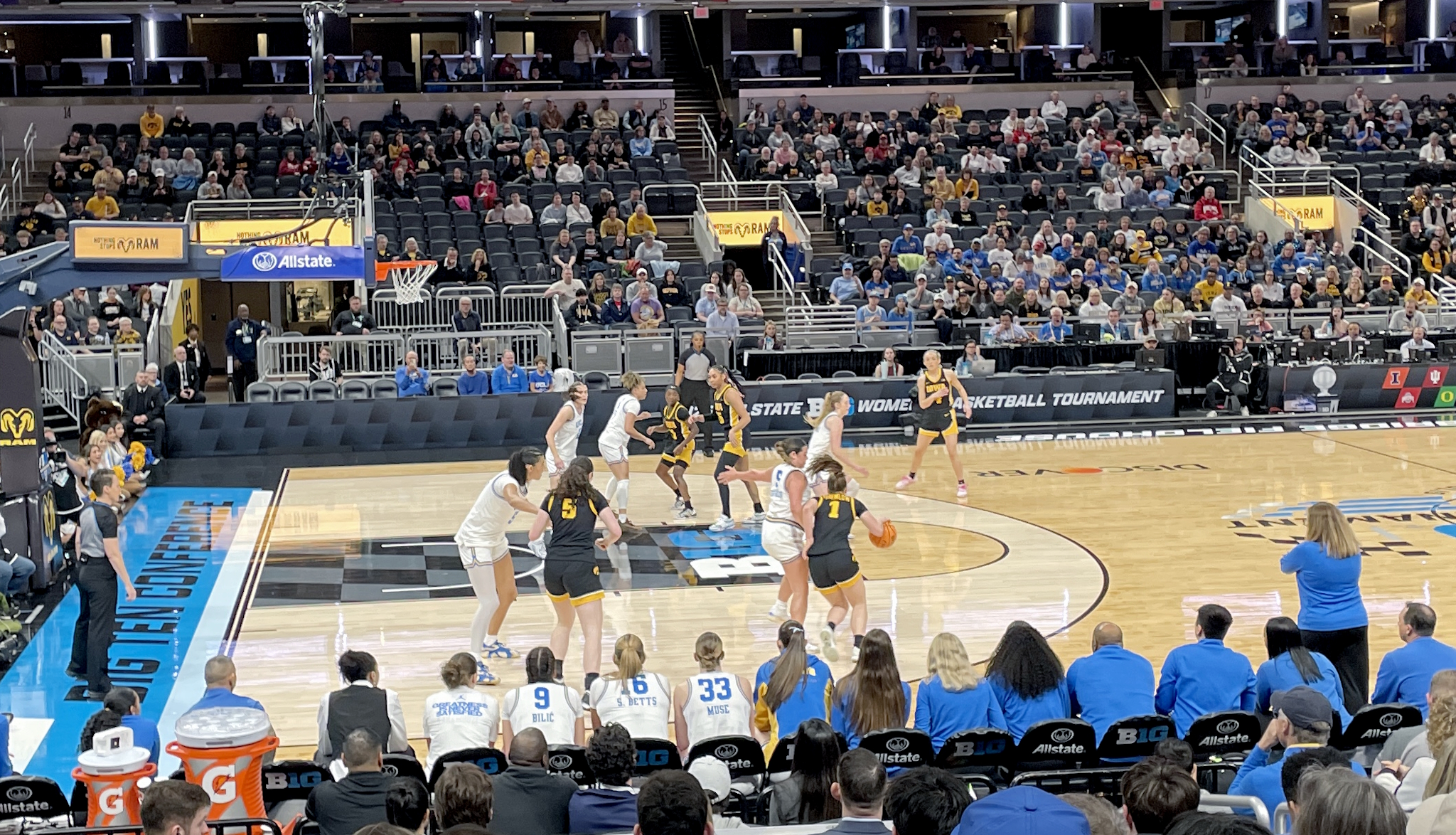
2026 Big Ten Women's Basketball tournament Championship game UCLA vs. Iowa

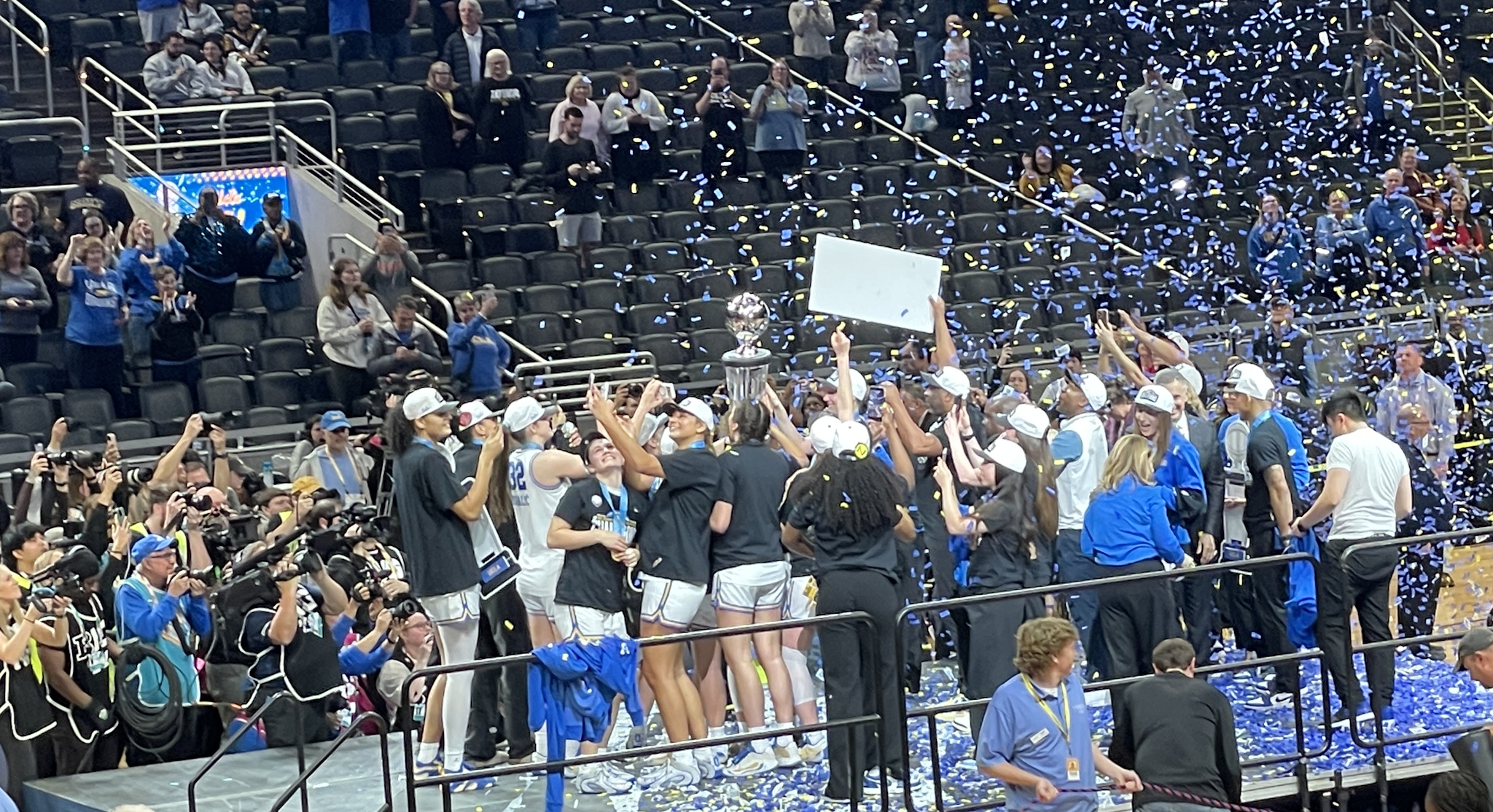
The 2025-26 UCLA Women's Basketball team Big Ten Conference Tournament Trophy presentation

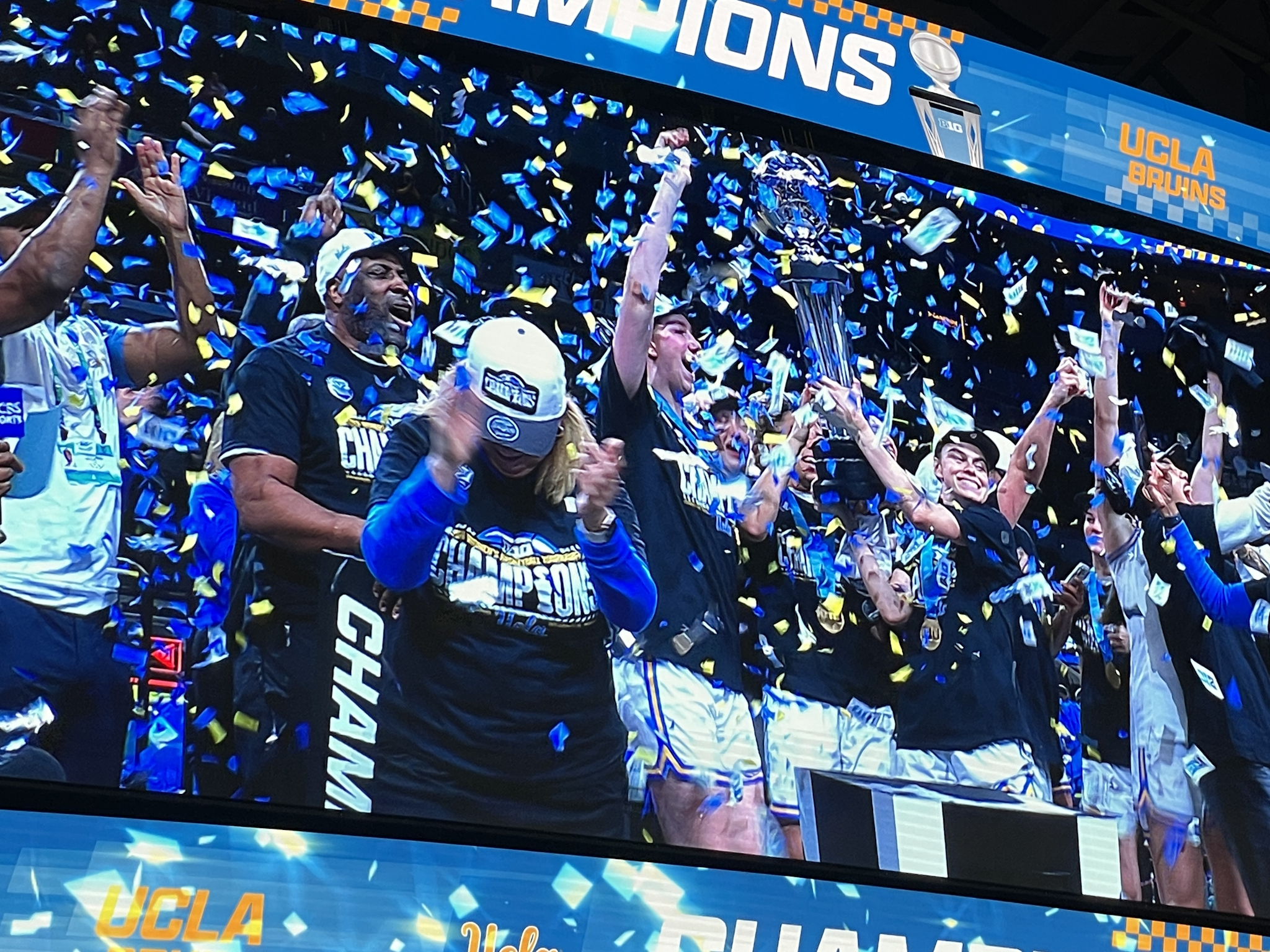
2025-26 UCLA Bruins Women's basketball team Big Ten Conference Tournament Trophy celebration

== Seeds ==
The top 15 Big Ten schools participated in the tournament. Teams were seeded by conference record, with a tiebreaker system used to seed teams with identical conference records. The top nine teams received a first round bye and the top four teams received a double bye.

Seed	School	Conference	Tiebreaker
1	UCLA	18–0	
2	Iowa	15–3	1–0 vs. MICH
3	Michigan	15–3	0–1 vs IOWA
4	Minnesota	13–5	1–0 vs. OSU
5	Ohio State	13–5	0–1 vs. MINN
6	Maryland	11–7	1–0 vs. MSU
7	Michigan State	11–7	0–1 vs. MD
8	Washington	10–8	
9	USC	9–9	1–0 vs. ILL
10	Illinois	9–9	0–1 vs. USC
11	Oregon	8-10	
12	Nebraska	7–11	
13	Indiana	6–12	
14	Purdue	5–13	1–0 vs. WIS
15	Wisconsin	5–13	0–1 vs. PUR
DNQ	Penn State	4–14	
DNQ	Northwestern	2–16	
DNQ	Rutgers	1–17	

== Schedule ==
Session	Game	Time*	Matchup^{#}	Score	Television	Attendance
First round – Wednesday, March 4
1	1	3:30 p.m.	No. 13 Indiana vs. No. 12 Nebraska	72–69	Peacock/NBCSN	6,587
1	2	6:00 p.m.	No. 15 Wisconsin vs. No. 10 Illinois	70–82	Peacock/NBCSN	6,587
1	3	8:30 p.m.	No. 14 Purdue vs. No. 11 Oregon	64–82	Peacock/NBCSN	6,587
Second round – Thursday, March 5
2	4	12:00 p.m.	No. 9 USC vs. No. 8 Washington	64–76	BTN	5,962
2	5	2:30 p.m.	No. 13 Indiana vs. No. 5 Ohio State	59–83	BTN	5,962
3	6	6:30 p.m.	No. 10 Illinois vs. No. 7 Michigan State	71–69	BTN	5,149
3	7	9:00 p.m.	No. 11 Oregon vs. No. 6 Maryland	73–68	BTN	5,149
Quarterfinals – Friday, March 6
4	8	12:00 p.m.	No. 8 Washington vs. No. 1 UCLA	60–78	BTN	5,146
4	9	2:30 p.m.	No. 5 Ohio State vs. No. 4 Minnesota	60–55	BTN	5,146
5	10	6:30 p.m.	No. 10 Illinois vs. No. 2 Iowa	58–64	BTN	6,053
5	11	9:00 p.m.	No. 11 Oregon vs. No. 3 Michigan	58–80	BTN	6,053
Semifinals – Saturday, March 7
6	12	2:00 p.m.	No. 5 Ohio State vs. No. 1 UCLA	62–72	BTN	6,387
6	13	4:30 p.m.	No. 3 Michigan vs. No. 2 Iowa	42–59	BTN	6,387
Championship – Sunday, March 8
7	14	2:15 p.m.	No. 2 Iowa vs. No. 1 UCLA	45–96	CBS	6,451

*Game times in EST through the semifinals and EDT for the championship. #Rankings denote tournament seeding.

== Bracket ==
First round Wednesday, March 4 Peacock/NBCSN
12	Nebraska	69
13	Indiana	72
10	Illinois	82
15	Wisconsin	70
11	Oregon	82
14	Purdue	64

Second round Thursday, March 5 BTN
8	Washington	76
9	USC	64
5	Ohio State	83
13	Indiana	59
7	Michigan State	69
10	Illinois	71
6	Maryland	68
11	Oregon	73

Quarterfinals; Friday, March 6 BTN
1	UCLA	78
8	Washington	60
4	Minnesota	55
5	Ohio State	60
2	Iowa	64
10	Illinois	58
3	Michigan	80
11	Oregon	58

Semifinals; Saturday, March 7 BTN
1	UCLA	72
5	Ohio State	62
2	Iowa	59
3	Michigan	42

Championship; Sunday, March 8 CBS
1	UCLA	96
2	Iowa	45

* denotes overtime period

== Game summaries ==
=== First round ===
Peacock/NBCSN

March 4
3:30 p.m.

Report

No. 13 Indiana 72, No. 12 Nebraska 69
Scoring by quarter: 15–29, 13–16, 19–10, 25–14
Pts: Shay Ciezki (22); Rebs: Edessa Noyan (10); Asts: Shay Ciezki (7)	Pts: Amiah Hargrove (23); Rebs: Jessica Petrie (10); Asts: Britt Prince (8)

Gainbridge Fieldhouse
Indianapolis, IN
Referees: Gina Cross, Cameron Inouye, Chuck Gonzalez

Peacock/NBCSN

March 4
6:00 p.m.

Report

No. 15 Wisconsin 70, No. 10 Illinois 82
Scoring by quarter: 17–23, 16–18, 17–21, 20–20
Pts: Gift Uchenna (24); Rebs: Tied (6); Asts: Ronnie Porter (5)	Pts: Berry Wallace (22); Rebs: Tied (6); Asts: Destiny Jackson (5)

Gainbridge Fieldhouse
Indianapolis, IN
Referees: Brian Hall, Felicia Grinter, Nykesha Thompson

Peacock/NBCSN

March 4
8:30 p.m.

Report

No. 14 Purdue 64, No. 11 Oregon 82
Scoring by quarter: 12–21, 12–26, 25–17, 15–18
Pts: Lana McCarthy (14); Rebs: Lana McCarthy (9); Asts: Nya Smith (4)	Pts: Katie Fiso (20); Rebs: Ehis Etute (12); Asts: Katie Fiso (4)

Gainbridge Fieldhouse
Indianapolis, IN
Attendance: 6,587
Referees: Melissa Barlow, Kevin Pethtel, Tim Daley

=== Second round ===
BTN

March 5
12:00 p.m.

Report

No. 9 USC 64, No. 8 Washington 76
Scoring by quarter: 6–8, 14–24, 16–24, 28–20
Pts: Londynn Jones (19); Rebs: Laura Williams (13); Asts: Tied (3)	Pts: Elle Ladine (25); Rebs: Yulia Grabovskaia (10); Asts: Tied (4)

Gainbridge Fieldhouse
Indianapolis, IN
Attendance: 5,962
Referees: Melissa Barlow, Brian Hall, Angie Enlund

BTN

March 5
2:30 p.m.

Report

No. 13 Indiana 59, No. 5 Ohio State 83
Scoring by quarter: 12–12, 12–24, 16–25, 19–22
Pts: Maya Makalusky (21); Rebs: Edessa Noyan (11); Asts: Shay Ciezki (5)	Pts: Jaloni Cambridge (19); Rebs: Elsa Lemmilä (13); Asts: Chance Gray (6)

Gainbridge Fieldhouse
Indianapolis, IN
Attendance: 5,962
Referees: Felicia Grinter, Nykesha Thompson, Frank Steratore

BTN

March 5
6:30 p.m.

Report

No. 10 Illinois 71, No. 7 Michigan State 69
Scoring by quarter: 20–17, 16–12, 17–19, 18–21
Pts: Cearah Parchment (15); Rebs: Tied (6); Asts: Destiny Jackson (6)	Pts: Kennedy Blair (30); Rebs: Grace VanSlooten (9); Asts: Kennedy Blair (5)

Gainbridge Fieldhouse
Indianapolis, IN
Attendance: 5,149
Referees: Gina Cross, Kevin Pethtel, Timothy Daley

BTN

March 5
9:00 p.m.

Report

No. 11 Oregon 73, No. 6 Maryland 68
Scoring by quarter: 15–21, 16–11, 21–25, 21–11
Pts: Ehis Etute (20); Rebs: Ehis Etute (10); Asts: Katie Fiso (5)	Pts: Oluchi Okananwa (27); Rebs: Saylor Poffenbarger (6); Asts: Yarden Garzon (6)

Gainbridge Fieldhouse
Indianapolis, IN
Attendance: 5,149
Referees: Chuck Gonzalez, Cameron Inouye, Bruce Morris

=== Quarterfinals ===
BTN

March 6
12:00 p.m.

Report

No. 8 Washington 60, No. 1 UCLA 78
Scoring by quarter: 15–6, 9–21, 17–22, 19–29
Pts: Avery Howell (18); Rebs: Elle Ladine (7); Asts: Sayvia Sellers (8)	Pts: Lauren Betts (26); Rebs: Lauren Betts (8); Asts: Kiki Rice (6)

Gainbridge Fieldhouse
Indianapolis, IN
Attendance: 5,146
Referees: Julie Krommenhoek, Nykesha Thompson, Tim Daley

BTN

March 6
2:30 p.m.

Report

No. 5 Ohio State 60, No. 4 Minnesota 55
Scoring by quarter: 16–18, 16–10, 15–14, 13–13
Pts: Tied (17); Rebs: Elsa Lemmilä (11); Asts: Jaloni Cambridge (6)	Pts: Grace Grocholski (18); Rebs: Sophie Hart (19); Asts: Mara Braun (6)

Gainbridge Fieldhouse
Indianapolis, IN
Attendance: 5,146
Referees: Brenda Pantoja, Tiara Cruse, Angie Enlund

BTN

March 6
6:30 p.m.

Report

No. 10 Illinois 58, No. 2 Iowa 64
Scoring by quarter: 11–21, 12–16, 8–16, 27–11
Pts: Jasmine Brown-Hagger (22); Rebs: Cearah Parchment (9); Asts: Destiny Jackson (6)	Pts: Ava Heiden (16); Rebs: Journey Houston (12); Asts: Taylor Stremlow (6)

Gainbridge Fieldhouse
Indianapolis, IN
Attendance: 6,053
Referees: Maj Forsberg, Cameron Inouye, Maggie Tieman

BTN

March 6
9:00 p.m.

Report

No. 11 Oregon 58, No. 3 Michigan 80
Scoring by quarter: 13–18, 11–15, 19–23, 15–24
Pts: Katie Fiso (22); Rebs: Ehis Etute (11); Asts: Katie Fiso (7)	Pts: Syla Swords (17); Rebs: Syla Swords (8); Asts: Mila Holloway (10)

Gainbridge Fieldhouse
Indianapolis, IN
Attendance: 6,053
Referees: Melissa Barlow, Natasha Camy, Mark Resch

=== Semifinals ===
BTN

March 7
2:00 p.m.

No. 5 Ohio State 62, No. 1 UCLA 72
Scoring by quarter: 10–14, 11–18, 19–20, 22–20
Pts: Chance Gray (23); Rebs: Kennedy Cambridge (8); Asts: Elsa Lemmilä (6)	Pts: Kiki Rice (17); Rebs: Lauren Betts (9); Asts: Charlisse Leger-Walker (6)

Gainbridge Fieldhouse
Indianapolis, IN
Attendance: 6,387
Referees: Julie Krommenhoek, Maj Forsberg, Felicia Grinter

BTN

March 7
4:30 p.m.

No. 3 Michigan 42, No. 2 Iowa 59
Scoring by quarter: 4–13, 18–15, 14–7, 6–24
Pts: Tied (10); Rebs: Tied (6); Asts: Tied (2)	Pts: Ava Heiden (16); Rebs: Hannah Stuelke (10); Asts: Taylor Stremlow (6)

Gainbridge Fieldhouse
Indianapolis, IN
Attendance: 6,387
Referees: Michael McConnell, Natasha Camy, Maggie Tieman

=== Championship ===
CBS

March 8
2:15 p.m.

No. 2 Iowa 46, No. 1 UCLA 95
Scoring by quarter: 5–22, 15–20, 16–25, 9–29
Pts: Ava Heiden (15); Rebs: Tied (4); Asts: Chazadi Wright (5)	Pts: Gianna Kneepkens (19); Rebs: Tied (7); Asts: Kiki Rice (8)

Gainbridge Fieldhouse
Indianapolis, IN
Attendance: 6,451
Referees: Gina Cross, Brenda Pantoja, Lisa Jones

== All-Tournament team ==
- Kiki Rice, UCLA (Most Outstanding Player)
- Lauren Betts, UCLA
- Ava Heiden, Iowa
- Chance Gray, Ohio State
- Hannah Stuelke, Iowa

== Tournament notes ==
- New tournament records were set in the championship game by the UCLA Bruins in the victory over the Iowa Hawkeyes
  - UCLA's 51 points was the largest margin of victory in a Big Ten Tournament Final. The previous record was Iowa's 33-point victory over Ohio State in the 2023 Big Ten women's basketball tournament.
  - The Bruins' shooting percentage of 63.5 percent (40-for-63) from the field was the highest percentage by a team in any Big Ten Tournament game.
  - The UCLA Bruins set the record for assists in any Big Ten Tournament game with 34
  - The UCLA Bruins tied the record for most steals in the Big Ten Tournament Championship Game with 15.
  - The UCLA 51 point margin of victory over number 8 ranked Iowa is the highest of a team over a top ten team in the NCAA era.
- For the second year in a row, a record-tying twelve Big Ten teams were invited to the 2026 NCAA Division I women's basketball tournament: UCLA, Iowa, Michigan, Ohio State, Minnesota, Maryland, Michigan State, Washington, Illinois, Oregon, USC, and Nebraska. Five teams hosted first-round games. UCLA, Minnesota, and Michigan would advance to the Sweet Sixteen. UCLA defeated Minnesota to advance to the Elite Eight. The Bruins would win the 2026 NCAA Division I women's basketball championship game, defeating South Carolina.
- Wisconsin was invited to the 2026 Women's Basketball Invitation Tournament. They lost in the semifinals to Columbia.
